= 2022 African Nations Championship Group B =

Football tournament group stage

Group B of the 2022 African Nations Championship, consisting of DR Congo, Ivory Coast, Senegal and Uganda, began on 14 January and will end on 24 January 2023.

== Teams ==
Draw position	Team	Zone	Date of qualification	Finals appearance	Last appearance	Previous best performance							
Draw position	Team	Zone	Date of qualification	Finals appearance	Last appearance	Previous best performance	B1	DR Congo	Central Zone	4 September 2022	6th	2020	Champions (2009, 2016)
B2	Ivory Coast	Western Zone B	4 September 2022	5th	2018	Third place (2016)							
B3	Senegal	Western Zone A	2 September 2022	3rd	2016	Fourth place (2009)							
B4	Uganda	Central Eastern Zone	3 September 2022	6th	2020	Group stage (2011, 2014, 2016, 2018, 2020)							

== Standings ==
Pos	Team	Pld	W	D	L	GF	GA	GD	Pts	Qualification
1	Senegal	3	2	0	1	4	1	+3	6	Knockout stage
2	Ivory Coast	3	1	1	1	3	2	+1	4	Knockout stage
3	Uganda	3	1	1	1	2	3	−1	4	
4	DR Congo	3	0	2	1	0	3	−3	2	

Source: CAF
Rules for classification: Tiebreakers

== Matches ==
=== DR Congo vs Uganda ===
14 January 2023
17:00

DR Congo	0–0	Uganda
	Report

19 May 1956 Stadium, Annaba
Attendance: 16,000
Referee: Patrice Milazare (Mauritius)

DR Congo	Uganda

Formation: 4–2–3–1
GK	16	Baggio Siadi
DF	18	Kévin Mondeko
DF	2	Issama Mpeko (c)
DF	12	Luzolo Sita		(substituted off) 78'
DF	5	Ikoyo Iyembe
MF	8	Merveille Wamba		(substituted off) 45'
MF	11	Jonathan Ikangalombo Kapela
MF	27	Miché Mika	(yellow card) 26'	(substituted off) 60'
MF	6	Peter Mutumosi Zilu	(yellow card) 65'
FW	7	Philippes Kinzumbi		(substituted off) 90+3'
FW	19	Addam Bossu		(substituted off) 78'
Substitutions:
GK	23	Yves Mukawa
DF	28	Arnold Mavungu
DF	14	Pathous Ebunga
MF	21	Nzengele Mpia		(substituted on) 78'
FW	9	Jean-Marc Makusu Mundele		(substituted on) 60'
DF	3	Chadrack Isaka		(substituted on) 78'
MF	13	Onoya Sangana
FW	15	Obed Mayamba
FW	17	Wabantu Eric Kabwe		(substituted on) 90+3'
DF	4	Guy Magema
GK	1	Hervé Lomboto
MF	24	Sozé Zemanga		(substituted on) 45'
Coach:
(France) Sébastien Desabre

Formation: 4–3–3
GK	1	Nafian Alionzi
DF	24	Geoffrey Wasswa	(yellow card) 84'
DF	2	James Begisa
DF	17	Fred Gift
DF	21	Derrick Ndahiro
MF	15	Marvin Youngman
MF	25	Abdul Watambala		(substituted off) 55'
MF	23	Moses Waiswa		(substituted off) 68'
FW	13	Milton Karisa (c)		(substituted off) 89'
FW	9	Frank Ssebuufu		(substituted off) 88'
FW	7	Rogers Mato		(substituted off) 56'
Substitutions:
DF	20	Ashraf Mandela
DF	5	Hilary Mukundane
FW	11	Ibrahim Orit		(substituted on) 56'
FW	22	Titus Ssematimba		(substituted on) 55'
MF	14	Bright Anukani
DF	4	Kenneth Semakula		(substituted on) 68'
DF	12	Isa Mubiru
GK	18	Joel Mutakubwa
GK	19	Jack Komakech
MF	16	Moses Okabo
MF	10	Travis Mutyaba		(substituted on) 89'
FW	8	Nelson Senkatuka		(substituted on) 88'
Coach:
(Serbia) Milutin Sredojević

Man of the Match:
Jonathan Ikangalombo Kapela (DR Congo)

Assistant referees:
Hensley Petrousse (Seychelles)
Clemence Kanduku (Malawi)
Fourth official:
Kalilou Ibrahim Traoré (Ivory Coast)

=== Ivory Coast vs Senegal ===
14 January 2023
20:00

Ivory Coast	0–1	Senegal
	Report	Ndiaye 80'

19 May 1956 Stadium, Annaba
Attendance: 16,000
Referee: Lotfi Bekouassa (Algeria)

Ivory Coast	Senegal

Formation: 4–2–3–1
GK	1	Charles Ayayi
DF	25	Moise Gbai
DF	21	Abdoul Siahoune
DF	12	Souleymane Coulibaly
DF	2	Kouassi Attohoula
MF	6	Mohamed Zougrana
MF	19	Essis Beaudeleire Aka (c)
MF	11	Abdramane Konaté	(substituted off) 72'
MF	8	Pacome Zouzoua	(substituted off) 89'
MF	14	Aubin Kouamé	(substituted off) 72'
FW	9	Sankara Karamoko
Substitutions:
FW	20	Patrick Ouotro	(substituted on) 72'
FW	7	Mohamed Sylla	(substituted on) 72'
DF	18	Serge Badjo
MF	4	Marc Goua
MF	3	Alpha Sidibé
MF	15	Constant Wayou
GK	23	Drissa Bamba
MF	22	Salifou Diarrassouba	(substituted on) 89'
DF	17	Ande Habib Cirille
DF	5	Issif Traore
MF	10	Anicet Oura
MF	13	Semelo Gueï
Coach:
(Ivory Coast) Souhalio Haïdara

Formation: 4–2–3–1
GK	23	Pape Sy
DF	3	Ousmane Diouf
DF	4	Mamadou Sané
DF	22	Cheikhou Ndiaye
DF	12	Cheikh Sidibé
MF	5	Lamine Camara
MF	6	Ousmane Kané
MF	11	Malick Mbaye		(substituted off) 90+2'
MF	20	Elimane Oumar Cissé		(substituted off) 68'
MF	21	Moussa Kanté	(yellow card) 45+2'	(substituted off) 68'
FW	7	Cheikh Diouf (c)		(substituted off) 90+6'
Substitutions:
FW	9	Raymond Ndour		(substituted on) 90+6'
MF	13	Libasse Ngom
DF	15	Melo Ndiaye
MF	19	Djibril Diarra		(substituted on) 90+2'
GK	1	Pape Abdoulaye Dieng
FW	10	Pape Diallo		(substituted on) 68'
GK	16	Alioune Badara Faty
DF	2	Abdoulaye Diedhiou
MF	17	Serigne Koïté
DF	8	Moussa Sogue
MF	14	Moussa Ndiaye		(substituted on) 68'
DF	18	El Hadji Baldé
Coach:
(Senegal) Pape Thiaw

Man of the Match:
Lamine Camara (Senegal)

Assistant referees:
Akram Abbes Zerhouni (Algeria)
Sid Ali Brahim El Hamlaoui (Algeria)
Fourth official:
Messie Nkounkou (Republic of Congo)

=== DR Congo vs Ivory Coast ===
18 January 2023
17:00

DR Congo	0–0	Ivory Coast
	Report

19 May 1956 Stadium, Annaba
Referee: Mohamed Adel (Egypt)

DR Congo	Ivory Coast

Formation: 4–2–3–1
GK	16	Baggio Siadi
DF	3	Chadrack Isaka
DF	4	Guy Magema
DF	5	Ikoyo Iyembe
DF	2	Issama Mpeko (c)
MF	24	Sozé Zemanga
MF	27	Miché Mika		(substituted off) 68'
MF	11	Jonathan Ikangalombo Kapela		(substituted off) 84'
MF	21	Nzengele Mpia		(substituted off) 68'
FW	17	Wabantu Eric Kabwe	(yellow card) 25'	(substituted off) 46'
FW	9	Jean-Marc Makusu Mundele		(substituted off) 84'
Substitutions:
FW	26	Fortuna Boeny Sacré
MF	13	Onoya Sangana		(substituted on) 68'
FW	10	Élie Mpanzu		(substituted on) 46'
FW	15	Obed Mayamba		(substituted on) 84'
DF	12	Luzolo Sita
GK	23	Yves Mukawa
DF	28	Arnold Mavungu
FW	7	Philippes Kinzumbi		(substituted on) 68'
DF	14	Pathous Ebunga
FW	19	Addam Bossu		(substituted on) 84'
MF	22	Mira Kalonji
GK	1	Hervé Lomboto
Coach:
(France) Sébastien Desabre

Formation: 4–2–3–1
GK	1	Charles Ayayi
DF	17	Ande Habib Cirille
DF	12	Souleymane Coulibaly	(yellow card) 39'
DF	21	Abdoul Siahoune
DF	2	Kouassi Attohoula
MF	19	Essis Beaudeleire Aka (c)
MF	6	Mohamed Zougrana	(yellow card) 41' (yellow-red card) 87'
FW	7	Mohamed Sylla		(substituted off) 71'
FW	15	Constant Wayou
MF	22	Salifou Diarrassouba
FW	20	Patrick Ouotro		(substituted off) 71'
Substitutions:
GK	23	Drissa Bamba
DF	18	Serge Badjo
MF	8	Pacome Zouzoua
FW	9	Sankara Karamoko		(substituted on) 71'
GK	16	Alimi Amine Adissa Diakite
MF	4	Marc Goua
MF	10	Anicet Oura		(substituted on) 71'
MF	14	Aubin Kouamé
MF	11	Abdramane Konaté
MF	13	Semelo Gueï
MF	3	Alpha Sidibé
DF	5	Issif Traore
Coach:
(Ivory Coast) Souhalio Haïdara

Man of the Match:
Jonathan Ikangalombo Kapela (DR Congo)

Assistant referees:
Ivanildo Meirelles De O Sanche Lopes (Angola)
Clemence Kanduku (Malawi)
Fourth official:
Karim Sabry (Morocco)

=== Senegal vs Uganda ===
18 January 2023
20:00

Senegal	0–1	Uganda
	Report	Karisa 33'

19 May 1956 Stadium, Annaba
Referee: Mehrez Melki (Tunisia)

Senegal	Uganda

Formation: 4–2–3–1
GK	23	Pape Sy
DF	12	Cheikh Sidibé
DF	22	Cheikhou Ndiaye (c)
DF	3	Ousmane Diouf
DF	4	Mamadou Sané
MF	5	Lamine Camara
MF	6	Ousmane Kané		(substituted off) 79'
FW	10	Pape Diallo		(substituted off) 68'
MF	14	Moussa Ndiaye		(substituted off) 68'
MF	11	Malick Mbaye		(substituted off) 80'
FW	7	Cheikh Diouf
Substitutions:
DF	2	Abdoulaye Diedhiou
DF	18	El Hadji Baldé
FW	9	Raymond Ndour	(yellow card) 80'	(substituted on) 80' (substituted off) 90+3'
MF	19	Djibril Diarra
MF	20	Elimane Oumar Cissé		(substituted on) 68'
GK	16	Alioune Badara Faty
MF	13	Libasse Ngom	(substituted on) 79'	(red card) 83'
GK	1	Pape Abdoulaye Dieng
DF	15	Melo Ndiaye
MF	17	Serigne Koïté		(substituted on) 90+3'
MF	21	Moussa Kanté		(substituted on) 68'
DF	8	Moussa Sogue
Coach:
(Senegal) Pape Thiaw

Formation: 3–4–3
GK	1	Nafian Alionzi	(yellow card) 20'
DF	24	Geoffrey Wasswa
DF	4	Kenneth Semakula
DF	17	Fred Gift
MF	15	Marvin Youngman		(substituted off) 46'
MF	23	Moses Waiswa		(substituted off) 68'
DF	2	James Begisa
DF	21	Derrick Ndahiro
FW	13	Milton Karisa (c)		(substituted off) 90+3'
FW	7	Rogers Mato		(substituted off) 77'
FW	9	Frank Ssebuufu		(substituted off) 68'
Substitutions:
GK	19	Jack Komakech
MF	14	Bright Anukani
FW	11	Ibrahim Orit
DF	12	Isa Mubiru
FW	22	Titus Ssematimba		(substituted on) 68'
MF	25	Abdul Watambala	(substituted on) 46'	(yellow card) 78'
FW	8	Nelson Senkatuka
MF	10	Travis Mutyaba		(substituted on) 77'
MF	16	Moses Okabo		(substituted on) 68'
DF	5	Hilary Mukundane		(substituted on) 90+3'
GK	18	Joel Mutakubwa
DF	20	Ashraf Mandela
Coach:
(Serbia) Milutin Sredojević

Man of the Match:
Kenneth Semakula (Uganda)

Assistant referees:
Rodrigue Menye Mpele (Cameroon)
Sanou Habib Judicael (Burkina Faso)
Fourth official:
Lotfi Bekouassa (Algeria)

=== Senegal vs DR Congo ===
22 January 2023
20:00

Senegal	3–0	DR Congo
Diouf 23'; Diallo 74'; Siadi 77' (o.g.)	Report

19 May 1956 Stadium, Annaba
Referee: Tom Abongile (South Africa)

Senegal	DR Congo

Formation: 4–1–4–1
GK	23	Pape Sy
DF	12	Cheikh Sidibé
DF	22	Cheikhou Ndiaye (c)
DF	3	Ousmane Diouf
DF	4	Mamadou Sané
FW	10	Pape Diallo		(substituted off) 86'
MF	5	Lamine Camara		(substituted off) 52'
MF	6	Ousmane Kané	(yellow card) 82'
MF	20	Elimane Oumar Cissé		(substituted off) 80'
MF	11	Malick Mbaye		(substituted off) 80'
FW	7	Cheikh Diouf		(substituted off) 86'
Substitutions:
DF	15	Melo Ndiaye
MF	17	Serigne Koïté		(substituted on) 86'
MF	19	Djibril Diarra		(substituted on) 80'
MF	14	Moussa Ndiaye		(substituted on) 52'
DF	2	Abdoulaye Diedhiou
DF	8	Moussa Sogue
GK	1	Pape Abdoulaye Dieng
GK	16	Alioune Badara Faty
DF	18	El Hadji Baldé		(substituted on) 86'
MF	21	Moussa Kanté		(substituted on) 80'
Coach:
(Senegal) Pape Thiaw

Formation: 4–2–3–1
GK	16	Baggio Siadi
DF	2	Issama Mpeko (c)		(substituted off) 46'
DF	5	Ikoyo Iyembe
DF	18	Kévin Mondeko	(red card) 33'
DF	14	Pathous Ebunga
MF	6	Peter Mutumosi Zilu		(substituted off) 71'
MF	13	Onoya Sangana		(substituted off) 46'
MF	10	Élie Mpanzu		(substituted off) 46'
MF	9	Jean-Marc Makusu Mundele
MF	7	Philippes Kinzumbi
FW	15	Obed Mayamba		(substituted off) 38'
Substitutions:
DF	3	Chadrack Isaka	(yellow card) 53'	(substituted on) 46'
MF	8	Merveille Wamba
MF	21	Nzengele Mpia		(substituted on) 71'
MF	27	Miché Mika		(substituted on) 46'
FW	17	Wabantu Eric Kabwe
FW	19	Addam Bossu		(substituted on) 46'
GK	1	Hervé Lomboto
DF	4	Guy Magema		(substituted on) 38'
MF	24	Sozé Zemanga
GK	23	Yves Mukawa
DF	12	Luzolo Sita
FW	26	Fortuna Boeny Sacré
Coach:
(France) Sébastien Desabre

Man of the Match:
Cheikh Diouf (Senegal)

Assistant referees:
Dieudonne Mutuyimana (Rwanda)
Emery Niyongabo (Burundi)
Fourth official:
Ibrahim Mutaz (Libya)

=== Uganda vs Ivory Coast ===
22 January 2023
20:00

Uganda	1–3	Ivory Coast
Waiswa 34' (pen.)	Report	Karamoko 12'; Ouotro 27'; Kouamé 78'

Nelson Mandela Stadium, Algiers
Referee: Blaise Yuven Ngwa (Cameroon)

Uganda	Ivory Coast

Formation: 4–2–3–1
GK	1	Nafian Alionzi
DF	21	Derrick Ndahiro
DF	17	Fred Gift	(yellow card) 40'	(substituted off) 82'
DF	24	Geoffrey Wasswa
DF	2	James Begisa		(substituted off) 82'
MF	25	Abdul Watambala		(substituted off) 46'
MF	4	Kenneth Semakula
MF	7	Rogers Mato
MF	23	Moses Waiswa		(substituted off) 66'
MF	13	Milton Karisa (c)
FW	9	Frank Ssebuufu		(substituted off) 46'
Substitutions:
FW	22	Titus Ssematimba		(substituted on) 46'
MF	10	Travis Mutyaba		(substituted on) 46'
MF	15	Marvin Youngman
GK	19	Jack Komakech
DF	12	Isa Mubiru
DF	5	Hilary Mukundane
DF	20	Ashraf Mandela
FW	8	Nelson Senkatuka		(substituted on) 66'
GK	18	Joel Mutakubwa
MF	16	Moses Okabo		(substituted on) 82'
FW	11	Ibrahim Orit		(substituted on) 82'
MF	14	Bright Anukani
Coach:
(Serbia) Milutin Sredojević

Formation: 4–2–3–1
GK	1	Charles Ayayi
DF	17	Ande Habib Cirille	(yellow card) 32'
DF	12	Souleymane Coulibaly
DF	21	Abdoul Siahoune
DF	2	Kouassi Attohoula
MF	13	Semelo Gueï
MF	19	Essis Beaudeleire Aka (c)
MF	9	Sankara Karamoko
MF	15	Constant Wayou		(substituted off) 46'
MF	22	Salifou Diarrassouba
FW	20	Patrick Ouotro		(substituted off) 53'
Substitutions:
DF	25	Moise Gbai
DF	5	Issif Traore
DF	18	Serge Badjo
MF	3	Alpha Sidibé
FW	7	Mohamed Sylla
MF	14	Aubin Kouamé		(substituted on) 53'
MF	8	Pacome Zouzoua	(yellow card) 63'	(substituted on) 60'
MF	11	Abdramane Konaté
MF	10	Anicet Oura
GK	23	Drissa Bamba
GK	16	Alimi Amine Adissa Diakite
Coach:
(Ivory Coast) Souhalio Haïdara

Man of the Match:
Sankara Karamoko (Ivory Coast)

Assistant referees:
Rodrigue Menye Mpele (Cameroon)
Ditsoga Boris Marlaise (Gabon)
Fourth official:
Samuel Uwikunda (Rwanda)

== Discipline ==
Fair play points would have been used as tiebreakers if the overall and head-to-head records of teams were tied. These were calculated based on yellow and red cards received in all group matches as follows:

- first yellow card: −1 point;
- indirect red card (second yellow card): −3 points;
- direct red card: −4 points;
- yellow card and direct red card: −5 points;

Only one of the above deductions was applied to a player in a single match.

Team	Match 1				Match 2				Match 3				Points
Team	Booked	(yellow card) (yellow-red card)	Sent off (straight red)	(yellow card) (red card)	Booked	(yellow card) (yellow-red card)	Sent off (straight red)	(yellow card) (red card)	Booked	(yellow card) (yellow-red card)	Sent off (straight red)	(yellow card) (red card)	Points
DR Congo	2				1				1		1		–8
Ivory Coast					1	1			2				–6
Senegal	1				1		1		1				–7
Uganda	1				2				1				–4
