= 2025 Africa Cup of Nations Group C =

Football tournament group stage

Group C of the 2025 Africa Cup of Nations took place from 23 to 30 December 2025. The group consisted of Nigeria, Tunisia, Uganda, and Tanzania.

Nigeria and Tunisia as the top two teams, along with Tanzania as one of the four best third-placed teams, advanced to the round of 16.

== Teams ==
Draw position	Team	Zone	Method of qualification	Date of qualification	Finals appearance	Last appearance	Previous best performance	FIFA Rankings	
Draw position	Team	Zone	Method of qualification	Date of qualification	Finals appearance	Last appearance	Previous best performance	December 2024 (Note: The rankings of December 2024 were used for seeding for the final draw.)	December 2025
C1	Nigeria	WAFU	Group D winners	14 November 2024	21st	2023	Winners (1980, 1994, 2013)	44	TBA
C2	Tunisia	UNAF	Group A runners-up	14 November 2024	22nd	2023	Winners (2004)	52	TBA
C3	Uganda	CECAFA	Group K runners-up	14 November 2024	8th	2023	Runners-up (1978)	88	TBA
C4	Tanzania	CECAFA	Group H runners-up	19 November 2024	4th	2021	Group stage (1980, 2019, 2023)	106	TBA

== Standings ==
Pos	Team	Pld	W	D	L	GF	GA	GD	Pts	Qualification
1	Nigeria	3	3	0	0	8	4	+4	9	Advance to knockout stage
2	Tunisia	3	1	1	1	6	5	+1	4	Advance to knockout stage
3	Tanzania	3	0	2	1	3	4	−1	2	Advance to knockout stage
4	Uganda	3	0	1	2	3	7	−4	1	

Source: CAF
Rules for classification: Group stage tiebreakers

== Matches ==
All times are local, CET (UTC+1).

=== Nigeria vs Tanzania ===
23 December 2025
18:30

Nigeria	2–1	Tanzania
Ajayi 36'; Lookman 52'	Report	M'Mombwa 50'

Fez Stadium, Fez
Attendance: 11,444
Referee: Dahane Beida (Mauritania)

Nigeria	Tanzania

GK	23	Stanley Nwabali
RB	2	Bright Osayi-Samuel
CB	6	Semi Ajayi
CB	21	Calvin Bassey
LB	3	Zaidu Sanusi
CM	11	Samuel Chukwueze		(substituted off) 59'
CM	4	Wilfred Ndidi (c)
CM	17	Alex Iwobi
AM	7	Ademola Lookman	(yellow card) 58'
CF	9	Victor Osimhen		(substituted off) 86'
CF	22	Akor Adams		(substituted off) 59'
Substitutes:
MF	10	Fisayo Dele-Bashiru		(substituted on) 59'
FW	15	Moses Simon		(substituted on) 59'
FW	19	Paul Onuachu		(substituted on) 86'
Manager:
(Mali) Éric Chelle

GK	28	Zuberi Foba
RB	22	Shomari Kapombe	(substituted off) 79'
CB	14	Bakari Mwamnyeto
CB	4	Ibrahim Hamad
LB	15	Mohamed Husseini
CM	27	Alphonce Msanga
CM	20	Novatus Miroshi
RW	12	Simon Msuva	(substituted off) 62'
AM	8	Charles M'Mombwa	(substituted off) 90+1'
LW	26	Tarryn Allarakhia	(substituted off) 79'
CF	10	Mbwana Samatta (c)
Substitutes:
FW	21	Kelvin John	(substituted on) 62'
MF	25	Haji Mnoga	(substituted on) 79'
DF	5	Dickson Job	(substituted on) 79'
FW	11	Kibu Denis	(substituted on) 90+1'
Manager:
(Argentina) Miguel Gamondi

=== Tunisia vs Uganda ===
23 December 2025
21:00

Tunisia	3–1	Uganda
Skhiri 10'; Achouri 40', 64'	Report	Omedi 90+2'

Rabat Olympic Stadium, Rabat
Attendance: 13,387
Referee: Patrice Mebiame (Gabon)

Tunisia	Uganda

GK	16	Aymen Dahmen
RB	20	Yan Valery
CB	6	Dylan Bronn
CB	3	Montassar Talbi
LB	2	Ali Abdi
DM	17	Ellyes Skhiri
CM	13	Ferjani Sassi (c)		(substituted off) 81'
CM	10	Hannibal Mejbri		(substituted off) 88'
RF	7	Elias Achouri		(substituted off) 82'
CF	9	Hazem Mastouri		(substituted off) 46'
LF	8	Elias Saad	(yellow card) 50'	(substituted off) 55'
Substitutes:
FW	19	Firas Chaouat		(substituted on) 46'
MF	5	Mohamed Ali Ben Romdhane		(substituted on) 55'
MF	25	Houssem Teka		(substituted on) 81'
MF	11	Ismael Gharbi		(substituted on) 82'
MF	26	Sebastian Tounekti		(substituted on) 88'
Manager:
Sami Trabelsi

GK	19	Jamal Salim
RB	5	Toby Sibbick
CB	2	Rogers Torach
CB	15	Jordan Obita
LB	23	Aziz Kayondo	(yellow card) 14'
RM	22	Jude Ssemugabi		(substituted off) 46'
CM	4	Kenneth Semakula		(substituted off) 71'
CM	8	Khalid Aucho (c)
LM	7	Rogers Mato		(substituted off) 84'
AM	27	Melvyn Lorenzen		(substituted off) 46'
CF	11	Steven Mukwala		(substituted off) 71'
Substitutes:
FW	10	Travis Mutyaba		(substituted on) 46'
MF	14	Denis Omedi		(substituted on) 46'
DF	12	Baba Alhassan	(yellow card) 71'	(substituted on) 71'
FW	24	James Bogere		(substituted on) 71'
FW	21	Allan Okello		(substituted on) 84'
Manager:
(Belgium) Paul Put

=== Nigeria vs Tunisia ===
27 December 2025
21:00

Nigeria	3–2	Tunisia
Osimhen 44'; Ndidi 50'; Lookman 67'	Report	Talbi 74'; Abdi 87' (pen.)

Fez Stadium, Fez
Attendance: 25,544
Referee: Boubou Traore (Mali)

Nigeria	Tunisia

GK	23	Stanley Nwabali	(yellow card) 90+6'
RB	2	Bright Osayi-Samuel
CB	6	Semi Ajayi	(yellow card) 56'
CB	21	Calvin Bassey
LB	13	Bruno Onyemaechi
DM	4	Wilfred Ndidi (c)
CM	8	Frank Onyeka		(substituted off) 79'
CM	17	Alex Iwobi
AM	7	Ademola Lookman		(substituted off) 90+2'
CF	9	Victor Osimhen	(yellow card) 44'
CF	22	Akor Adams		(substituted off) 79'
Substitutes:
FW	15	Moses Simon		(substituted on) 79'
FW	24	Chidera Ejuke		(substituted on) 79'
DF	20	Chidozie Awaziem		(substituted on) 90+2'
Manager:
(Mali) Éric Chelle

GK	16	Aymen Dahmen
RB	20	Yan Valery
CB	6	Dylan Bronn
CB	3	Montassar Talbi
LB	2	Ali Abdi
DM	17	Ellyes Skhiri
CM	5	Mohamed Ali Ben Romdhane	(substituted off) 61'
CM	13	Ferjani Sassi (c)
CM	10	Hannibal Mejbri
CF	9	Hazem Mastouri
CF	7	Elias Achouri	(substituted off) 75'
Substitutes:
MF	26	Sebastian Tounekti	(substituted on) 61'
MF	11	Ismaël Gharbi	(substituted on) 75'
Manager:
Sami Trabelsi

=== Uganda vs Tanzania ===
27 December 2025
18:30

Uganda	1–1	Tanzania
Ikpeazu 80'	Report	Msuva 59' (pen.)

Al Medina Stadium, Rabat
Attendance: 10,540
Referee: Jalal Jayed (Morocco)

Uganda	Tanzania

GK	18	Denis Onyango (c)	(yellow card) 71'
RB	4	Kenneth Semakula	(yellow card) 45+5'
CB	5	Toby Sibbick
CB	15	Jordan Obita
LB	23	Aziz Kayondo
RM	21	Allan Okello		(substituted off) 90+6'
CM	6	Bobosi Byaruhanga
CM	12	Baba Alhassan		(substituted off) 65'
LM	7	Rogers Mato
AM	10	Travis Mutyaba		(substituted off) 77'
CF	22	Jude Ssemugabi		(substituted off) 77'
Substitutes:
FW	14	Denis Omedi		(substituted on) 65'
FW	9	Uche Ikpeazu	(yellow card) 90+4'	(substituted on) 77'
FW	24	James Bogere		(substituted on) 77'
MF	16	Ronald Ssekiganda		(substituted on) 90+6'
Manager:
(Belgium) Paul Put

GK	28	Zuberi Foba
RB	25	Haji Mnoga	(yellow card) 88'
CB	14	Bakari Mwamnyeto (c)
CB	4	Ibrahim Hamad
LB	15	Mohamed Husseini
CM	27	Alphonce Msanga
CM	20	Novatus Miroshi
RW	26	Tarryn Allarakhia		(substituted off) 64'
AM	6	Feisal Salum		(substituted off) 84'
LW	12	Simon Msuva
CF	21	Kelvin John		(substituted off) 64'
Substitutes:
DF	5	Dickson Job	(yellow card) 73'	(substituted on) 64'
FW	10	Mbwana Samatta		(substituted on) 64'
FW	8	Charles M'Mombwa		(substituted on) 84'
Manager:
(Argentina) Miguel Gamondi

=== Uganda vs Nigeria ===
30 December 2025
17:00

Uganda	1–3	Nigeria
Mato 75'	Report	Onuachu 28'; Onyedika 62', 67'

Fez Stadium, Fez
Attendance: 11,545
Referee: Djindo Louis Houngnandande (Benin)

Uganda	Nigeria

GK	18	Denis Onyango (c)		(substituted off) 46'
RB	4	Kenneth Semakula
CB	5	Toby Sibbick
CB	15	Jordan Obita
LB	23	Aziz Kayondo
CM	6	Bobosi Byaruhanga
CM	12	Baba Alhassan		(substituted off) 59'
RW	14	Denis Omedi		(substituted off) 46'
AM	10	Travis Mutyaba		(substituted off) 46'
LW	7	Rogers Mato
CF	9	Uche Ikpeazu	(yellow card) 66'	(substituted off) 85'
Substitutes:
GK	19	Salim Magoola	(red card) 56'	(substituted on) 46'
MF	21	Allan Okello		(substituted on) 46'
FW	11	Steven Mukwala		(substituted on) 46'
GK	1	Nafian Alionzi		(substituted on) 59'
FW	22	Jude Ssemugabi		(substituted on) 85'
Manager:
(Belgium) Paul Put

GK	1	Francis Uzoho
RB	27	Ryan Alebiosu
CB	5	Igoh Ogbu
CB	21	Calvin Bassey	(yellow card) 4'	(substituted off) 46'
LB	13	Bruno Onyemaechi		(substituted off) 77'
RM	11	Samuel Chukwueze		(substituted off) 90+3'
CM	10	Fisayo Dele-Bashiru
CM	18	Raphael Onyedika
LM	15	Moses Simon
CF	9	Victor Osimhen (c)		(substituted off) 87'
CF	19	Paul Onuachu		(substituted off) 77'
Substitutes:
DF	20	Chidozie Awaziem	(yellow card) 90'	(substituted on) 46'
MF	28	Tochukwu Nnadi		(substituted on) 77'
DF	3	Zaidu Sanusi		(substituted on) 77'
FW	22	Akor Adams		(substituted on) 87'
FW	25	Salim Fago Lawal		(substituted on) 90+3'
Manager:
(Mali) Éric Chelle

=== Tanzania vs Tunisia ===
30 December 2025
17:00

Tanzania	1–1	Tunisia
Salum 48'	Report	Gharbi 43' (pen.)

Rabat Olympic Stadium, Rabat
Attendance: 15,205
Referee: Jean-Jacques Ndala (DR Congo)

Tanzania	Tunisia

GK	23	Hussein Masalanga
CB	5	Dickson Job
CB	14	Bakari Mwamnyeto	(yellow card) 57'
CB	4	Ibrahim Hamad	(yellow card) 41'
RM	25	Haji Mnoga		(substituted off) 90+5'
CM	27	Alphonce Msanga
CM	20	Novatus Miroshi
LM	15	Mohamed Husseini		(substituted off) 67'
AM	6	Feisal Salum		(substituted off) 86'
CF	12	Simon Msuva	(yellow card) 59'	(substituted off) 85'
CF	10	Mbwana Samatta (c)		(substituted off) 46'
Substitutes:
FW	9	Selemani Mwalimu		(substituted on) 46'
DF	2	Pascal Msindo		(substituted on) 67'
MF	26	Tarryn Allarakhia		(substituted on) 85'
MF	8	Charles M'Mombwa		(substituted on) 85'
DF	22	Shomari Kapombe		(substituted on) 90+5'
Manager:
(Argentina) Miguel Gamondi

GK	16	Aymen Dahmen
RB	20	Yan Valery	(yellow card) 31'
CB	6	Dylan Bronn
CB	3	Montassar Talbi
LB	2	Ali Abdi (c)
DM	17	Ellyes Skhiri
CM	11	Ismaël Gharbi		(substituted off) 88'
CM	10	Hannibal Mejbri		(substituted off) 88'
RF	7	Elias Achouri		(substituted off) 52'
CF	9	Hazem Mastouri		(substituted off) 64'
LF	26	Sebastian Tounekti		(substituted off) 64'
Substitutes:
MF	13	Ferjani Sassi		(substituted on) 52'
FW	23	Naïm Sliti		(substituted on) 64'
FW	27	Seifeddine Jaziri		(substituted on) 64'
MF	5	Mohamed Ali Ben Romdhane		(substituted on) 88'
MF	15	Mohamed Belhadj Mahmoud		(substituted on) 88'
Manager:
Sami Trabelsi
