= 2022 African Nations Championship final =

Final match of the 7th edition of CHAN

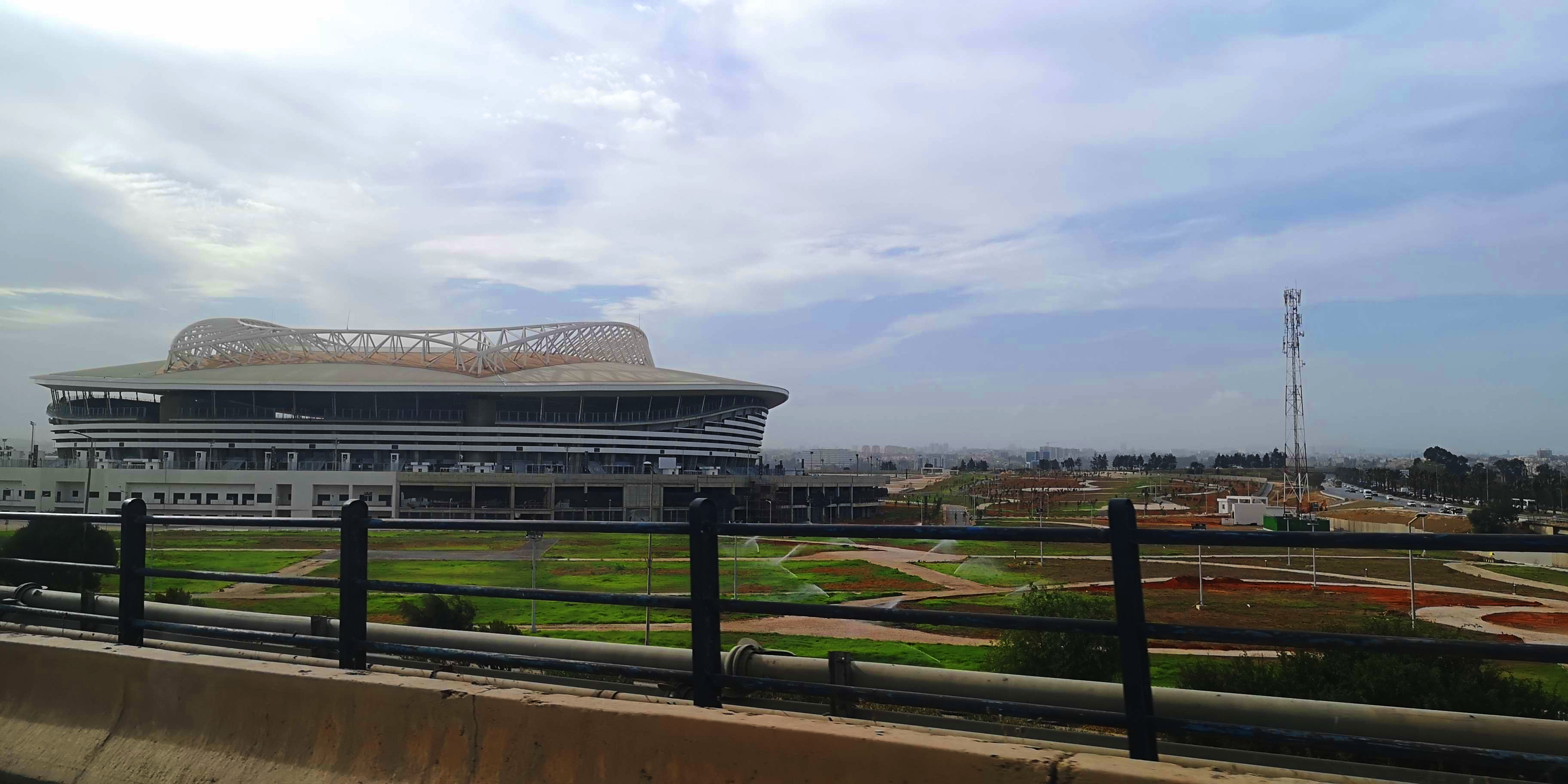
- Event: 2022 African Nations Championship
Algeria	Senegal
(Algeria)	(Senegal)
0	0
- After extra time; Senegal won 5–4 on penalties
- Date: 4 February 2023
- Venue: Nelson Mandela Stadium, Algiers
- Referee: Pierre Ghislain Atcho (Gabon)
- Attendance: 39,120
- Weather: Clear with a few clouds; 12 °C (54 °F); 78% humidity

The 2022 African Nations Championship final was a football match played between Senegal and Algeria at the Nelson Mandela Stadium in Algiers, Algeria, on 4 February 2023. It determined the winners of the 2022 African Nations Championship, the seventh edition of the biennial African international football tournament reserved for players playing in their local leagues.

Senegal defeated Algeria 5–4 on penalties to win the Championship.

== Venue ==
The local CHAN organizing committee in Algeria chose the newly-built and newly-inaugurated Nelson Mandela Stadium in the nation's capital city Algiers as the venue for both the opening match and the final. Inaugurated a week before the start of this edition of the tournament, this 40,784-seater stadium primarily hosts football matches and is named after anti-apartheid hero and former South African president, Nelson Mandela.

== Background ==
The African Nations Championship or the Championship of African Nations, abbreviated as CHAN, is the biennial African international football tournament reserved for players playing in the league of their birth nations. The 2022 edition or 7th edition of this tournament, colloquially referred to for short as the 2023 CHAN, was staged in Algeria with this concluding match of this edition.

== Route to the final ==
Algeria
Round
Senegal
Opponents
Result
Group stage
Opponents
Result
Libya
1–0
Match 1
Ivory Coast
0–1
Ethiopia
1–0
Match 2
Uganda
0–1
Mozambique
0–1
Match 3
DR Congo
3–0
Group A winner

Pos	Team	Pld	Pts
1	Algeria (H)	3	9
2	Mozambique	3	4
3	Libya	3	3
4	Ethiopia	3	1

Source: CAF
(H) Hosts
Final standings
Group B winner

Pos	Team	Pld	Pts
1	Senegal	3	6
2	Ivory Coast	3	4
3	Uganda	3	4
4	DR Congo	3	2

Source: CAF
Opponents
Result
Knockout stage
Opponents
Result
Ivory Coast
1–0
Quarter-finals
Mauritania
1–0
Niger
5–0
Semi-finals
Madagascar
1–0

== Match ==
=== Details ===
4 February 2023
20:30

Algeria	0–0 (a.e.t.)	Senegal
	Report
Penalties
Djahnit (penalty scored); Draoui (penalty scored); Bayazid (penalty scored); Laouafi (penalty scored); Mahious (penalty missed); Kendouci (penalty missed)	4–5	(penalty scored) Baldé; (penalty scored) M. N'Diaye; (penalty scored) M. Kanté; (penalty missed) C. Ndiaye; (penalty scored) L. Camara; (penalty scored) O. Diouf

Nelson Mandela Stadium, Algiers
Attendance: 39,120
Referee: Pierre Ghislain Atcho (Gabon)

Algeria	Senegal

Formation: 4–3–3
GK	16	Alexis Guendouz
DF	22	Mokhtar Belkhiter
DF	5	Ayoub Abdellaoui (c)
DF	2	Chouaib Keddad
DF	15	Zineddine Belaïd
MF	8	Zakaria Draoui
MF	12	Mohamed Islam Bakir		(substituted off) 68'
MF	14	Houssem Eddine Mrezigue	(yellow card) 111'	(substituted off) 120+2'
FW	21	Youcef Laouafi
FW	7	Abderrahmane Meziane	(yellow card) 23'	(substituted off) 114'
FW	18	Aymen Mahious	(yellow card) 108'
Substitutions:
GK	1	Farid Chaâl
MF	11	Oussama Chita
FW	10	Féth-Allah Tahar
DF	3	Hocine Dehiri
MF	4	Akram Djahnit		(substituted in) 120+2'
MF	27	Mohamed Ait El Hadj
DF	24	Saâdi Radouani
FW	20	Sofiane Bayazid		(substituted in) 114'
MF	6	Ahmed Kendouci	(yellow card) 75'	(substituted in) 68'
FW	9	Karim Aribi
DF	19	Ayoub Ghezala
DF	28	Houari Baouche
Coach:
(Algeria) Madjid Bougherra

Formation: 4–3–3
GK	23	Pape Mamadou Sy
DF	4	Mamadou Sané	(yellow card) 31'
DF	3	Ousmane Diouf
DF	22	Cheikhou Ndiaye (c)
DF	12	Cheikh Sidibé	(yellow card) 15'
MF	14	Moussa Ndiaye
MF	6	Ousmane Kané
MF	5	Lamine Camara	(yellow card) 23'
FW	11	Malick Mbaye		(substituted off) 113'
FW	17	Serigne Koïté		(substituted off) 83'
FW	10	Pape Diallo		(substituted off) 113'
Substitutions:
DF	18	El Hadji Baldé		(substituted in) 113'
MF	13	Libasse Ngom	(yellow card) 120'	(substituted in) 83'
GK	16	Alioune Badara Faty
FW	7	Cheikh Diouf
MF	20	Elimane Oumar Cissé
DF	2	Abdoulaye Diedhiou
GK	1	Pape Abdoulaye Dieng
FW	9	Raymond Ndour
MF	21	Moussa Kanté		(substituted in) 113'
DF	15	Melo Ndiaye
DF	8	Moussa Sogue
MF	19	Djibril Diarra
Coach:
(Senegal) Pape Thiaw

Man of the Match: L. Camara (Senegal)

Assistant referees:

- Hensley Petrousse (Seychelles)
- Adou Hermann Desire N'Goh (Ivory Coast)

Fourth official: Mahmood Ali Ismail (Sudan)

Video assistant referee: Haythem Guirat (Tunisia)

Assistant video assistant referee:
- Daniel Laryea (Ghana)
- Mohammed Abdallah Ibrahim (Sudan)

Match rules

- 90 minutes.
- 30 minutes of extra time if necessary.
- Penalty shoot-out if scores still level.
- Maximum of twelve named substitutes.
- Maximum of five substitutions, with a sixth allowed in extra time. (Note: Each team was given only three opportunities to make substitutions, with a fourth opportunity in extra time, excluding substitutions made at half-time, before the start of extra time and at half-time in extra time.)

=== Statistics ===
First half
Statistic	Algeria	Senegal
Goals scored	0	0
Total shots	3	3
Shots on target	1	0
Saves	0	1
Ball possession	46.2%	53.8%
Corner kicks	3	4
Fouls committed	10	5
Offsides	0	0
Yellow cards	1	3
Red cards	0	0

Second half
Statistic	Algeria	Senegal
Goals scored	0	0
Total shots	2	4
Shots on target	0	1
Saves	1	0
Ball possession	54.5%	45.5%
Corner kicks	9	3
Fouls committed	4	9
Offsides	0	0
Yellow cards	1	0
Red cards	0	0

Extra time
Statistic	Algeria	Senegal
Goals scored	0	0
Total shots	5	2
Shots on target	2	0
Saves	0	0
Ball possession	0%	0%
Corner kicks	3	0
Fouls committed	5	5
Offsides	0	0
Yellow cards	2	1
Red cards	0	0

Overall
Statistic	Algeria	Senegal
Goals scored	0	0
Total shots	23	19
Shots on target	8	6
Saves	6	3
Ball possession	52.9%	47.1%
Corner kicks	15	7
Fouls committed	19	17
Offsides	0	0
Yellow cards	4	4
Red cards	0	0

== See also ==
- 2022 African Nations Championship
