= Uganda national football team results (2020–present) =

This page details the match results and statistics of the Uganda national football team from 2020 to present.

== Results ==
Uganda's score is shown first in each case.

Date	Venue	Opponents	Score	Competition	Uganda scorers	Att.	Ref.
12 November 2020	St. Mary's Stadium, Kampala (H)	South Sudan	1–0	2021 Africa Cup of Nations qualification	Lwaliwa 86'	0 (Note: Match held behind closed doors due to the COVID-19 pandemic.)	
16 November 2020	Nyayo National Stadium, Nairobi (A)	South Sudan	0–1	2021 Africa Cup of Nations qualification	—	0	
1 January 2021	Stade Ahmadou Ahidjo, Yaoundé (A)	Cameroon	1–1	Friendly	Karisa 70'		
4 January 2021	Stade Ahmadou Ahidjo, Yaoundé (N}	Zambia	2–0	Friendly			
7 January 2021	Cameroon (N)	Niger	3–0	Friendly			
18 January 2021	Stade de la Réunification, Douala (N)	Rwanda	0–0	2020 African Nations Championship	—		
22 January 2021	Stade de la Réunification, Douala (N)	Togo	1–2	2020 African Nations Championship	Kyeyune 51'		
26 January 2021	Stade de la Réunification, Douala (N)	Morocco	2–5	2020 African Nations Championship	Orit 25', Kyeyune 84'		
24 March 2021	St. Mary's Stadium, Kampala (H)	Burkina Faso	0–0	2021 Africa Cup of Nations qualification	—		
29 March 2021	Kamuzu Stadium, Blantyre (A)	Malawi	0–1	2021 Africa Cup of Nations qualification	—		
10 June 2021	Orlando Stadium, Johannesburg (A)	South Africa	2–3	Friendly	Orit 17', Abdu 90'		
29 August 2021	Bahir Dar Stadium, Bahir Dar (A)	Ethiopia	1–2	Friendly	Sentamu		
2 September 2021	Nyayo National Stadium, Nairobi (A)	Kenya	0–0	2022 FIFA World Cup qualification		560	
6 September 2021	St. Mary's Stadium, Kampala (H)	Mali	0–0	2022 FIFA World Cup qualification			
7 October 2021	Kigali Pelé Stadium, Kigali (A)	Rwanda	1–0	2022 FIFA World Cup qualification	Bayo 41'		
10 October 2021	St. Mary's Stadium, Kampala (H)	Rwanda	1–0	2022 FIFA World Cup qualification	Bayo 22'		
11 November 2021	St. Mary's Stadium, Kampala (H)	Kenya	1–1	2022 FIFA World Cup qualification	Bayo 89'		
14 November 2021	Adrar Stadium, Agadir (N)	Mali	0–1	2022 FIFA World Cup qualification			
9 December 2021	Benjamin Mkapa Stadium, Dar es Salaam (A)	Tanzania	2–0	Friendly	Asaba 72', Vuni 90'		
12 January 2022	Titanic Sports Center, Belek (N)	Iceland	1–1	Friendly	Kaddu 31' pen.	28	
18 January 2022	Titanic Sports Center, Belek (N)	Moldova	3–2	Friendly	Kaddu 34' pen., 74' pen., Karisa 64'		
21 January 2022	Al-Madina Stadium, Baghdad (A)	Iraq	0–1	Friendly			
27 January 2022	Bahrain National Stadium, Riffa (A)	Bahrain	1–3	Friendly	Karisa 9'		
25 March 2022		Tajikistan	1–1	Friendly	Okwi 8'		
29 March 2022		Uzbekistan	2–4	Friendly	Miya 53', Okwi 78'		
4 June 2022		Algeria	0–2	2023 Africa Cup of Nations qualification			
8 June 2022		Niger	1–1	2023 Africa Cup of Nations qualification	Karisa 43'		
21 September 2022	Benina Martyrs Stadium, Benina (A)	Libya	0–0	Friendly			
24 September 2022	Benina Martyrs Stadium, Benina (N)	Tanzania	0–1	Friendly			
24 March 2023	Suez Canal Stadium, Ismailia (N)	Tanzania	0–1	2023 Africa Cup of Nations qualification			
28 March 2023	National Stadium, Dar es Salaam (A)	Tanzania	1–0	2023 Africa Cup of Nations qualification	Mato 90+1'		
14 June 2023	Japoma Stadium, Douala (N)	DR Congo	0–1	Friendly			
18 June 2023	Japoma Stadium, Douala (N)	Algeria	1–2	2023 Africa Cup of Nations qualification	Bayo 88'		
7 September 2023	Marrakesh Stadium, Marrakesh (N)	Niger	2–0	2023 Africa Cup of Nations qualification	Kayondo 17', Ochaya 39'		
13 October 2023	Stade du 26 Mars, Bamako (A)	Mali	0–1	Friendly			
17 October 2023	Al Hamriya Sports Club Stadium, Al Hamriyah (N)	Zambia	0–3	Friendly			
17 November 2023	Stade Municipal de Berkane, Berkane (N)	Guinea	1–2	2026 FIFA World Cup qualification	Bayo 30'		
21 November 2023	Stade Municipal de Berkane, Berkane (N)	Somalia	1–0	2026 FIFA World Cup qualification	Mato 4'		
19 January 2024	Cairo International Stadium, Cairo (N)	Kuwait	2–0	Friendly	Ssekiganda 4', Kitata 86'		
22 March 2024	Marrakesh Stadium, Marrakesh (N)	Comoros	0–4	Friendly			
26 March 2024	Marrakesh Stadium, Marrakesh (N)	Ghana	2–2	Friendly	Mukwala 23' pen., Shaban 82'		
7 June 2024	Mandela National Stadium, Kampala (H)	Botswana	1–0	2026 FIFA World Cup qualification	Shaban 74'	45,000	
10 June 2024	Mandela National Stadium, Kampala (H)	Algeria	1–2	2026 FIFA World Cup qualification	Mutyaba 10'	45,000	
6 September 2024	Orlando Stadium, Johannesburg (A)	South Africa	2–2	2025 Africa Cup of Nations qualification	Omedi 51', Mato 53'		
9 September 2024	Mandela National Stadium, Kampala (H)	Congo	2–0	2025 Africa Cup of Nations qualification	Kayondo 21', Ssemugabi 85'	38,000	
11 October 2024	Mandela National Stadium, Kampala (H)	South Sudan	1–0	2025 Africa Cup of Nations qualification	Mugabi 47'	38,000	
15 October 2024	Juba Stadium, Juba (A)	South Sudan	2–1	2025 Africa Cup of Nations qualification	Omedi 15', Leku 66' o.g.		
15 November 2024	Mandela National Stadium, Kampala (H)	South Africa	0–2	2025 Africa Cup of Nations qualification		38,000	
19 November 2024	Stade Alphonse Massemba-Débat, Brazzaville (A)	Congo	1–0	2025 Africa Cup of Nations qualification	Mutyaba 55'		
20 March 2025	Cairo International Stadium, Cairo (N)	Mozambique	1–3	2026 FIFA World Cup qualification	Shaban 7'	100	
25 March 2025	Mandela National Stadium, Kampala (H)	Guinea	1–0	2026 FIFA World Cup qualification		25,000	
9 June 2025	Marrakesh Stadium, Marrakesh (N)	Gambia	1–1	Friendly	Mato 25'		
