= Cheikh Sidibé =

Senegalese footballer (born 1999)

Personal information
- Full name: Cheikh Tidiane Sidibé
- Date of birth: 25 April 1999 (age 27)
- Place of birth: Thiaroye, Senegal
- Height: 1.76 m (5 ft 9 in)
- Position: Left back

Senior career*
Years	Team	Apps	(Gls)
2018–2020	Jaraaf		
2020–2021	Génération Foot		
2021–2023	Teungueth		
2023–2025	Azam	27	(2)
2025	HJK	0	(0)
2025	Klubi 04	2	(0)

International career^{‡}
2022–	Senegal	8	(0)
Medal record
Men's football
Representing Senegal
African Nations Championship
First place	2022 Algeria
- * Club domestic league appearances and goals as of 4 July 2025 ‡ National team caps and goals as of 9 September 2023

Cheikh Tidiane Sidibé (born 25 April 1999) is a Senegalese professional footballer who plays as a left back for the Senegal national team.

== Club career ==
Sidibé started football in his native Senegal, representing Jaraaf, Génération Foot and Teungueth Rufisque in Senegal Ligue 1 during 2019–2023. With Jaraaf, Sidibé also played in CAF Champions League and CAF Confederation Cup.

Since 2023, he played for Azam FC in Tanzanian Premier League, and represented the club in CAF Champions League and CAF Confederation Cup.

In March 2025, Sidibé moved to Finland and signed with Veikkausliiga club HJK Helsinki on a two-year deal with a one-year option. His contract was terminated on 25 August.

== International career ==
Sidibé made his international debut for the Senegal national team on 14 January 2023 in the 2022 African Nations Championship group stage match against Ivory Coast. He made six appearances for Senegal in the tournament as they were crowned the champions.

== Career statistics ==
=== Club ===
As of 4 July 2025

Appearances and goals by club, season and competition
Club	Season	League			Cup		League cup		Continental		Total	
Club	Season	Division	Apps	Goals	Apps	Goals	Apps	Goals	Apps	Goals	Apps	Goals
Jaraaf	2018–19	Senegal Premier League			–		–		3 (Note: Appearances in CAF Confederation Cup and CAF Champions League)	0	3	0
Jaraaf	2019–20	Senegal Premier League			–		–		–			
Génération Foot	2020–21	Senegal Premier League			–		–		–			
Teungueth	2021–22	Senegal Ligue 1			–		–		–			
Teungueth	2022–23	Senegal Ligue 1			–		–		–			
Azam	2023–24	Tanzanian Premier League	18	1	0	0	–		2 (Note: Appearances in CAF Confederation Cup)	0	20	1
Azam	2024–25	Tanzanian Premier League	9	1	0	0	–		1 (Note: Appearance(s) in CAF Champions League)	0	10	1
Azam	Total		27	2	0	0	0	0	3	0	30	2
HJK Helsinki	2025	Veikkausliiga	0	0	0	0	1	0	0	0	1	0
Klubi 04	2025	Ykkösliiga	2	0	–		–		–		2	0
Career total			29	2	0	0	1	0	6	0	36	2

=== International ===
As of 9 September 2023

Appearances and goals by national team and year
National team	Year	Apps	Goals
Senegal	2022	1	0
Senegal	2023	7	0
Total		8	0

== Honours ==
Jaraaf

- Senegal Ligue 1 runner-up: 2018–19

Azam

- Tanzanian Premier League runner-up: 2023–24

Senegal

- African Nations Championship: 2022
