= Idrissa Gueye (footballer, born 2006) =

Senegalese footballer (born 2006)

Personal information
- Date of birth: 16 September 2006 (age 20)
- Place of birth: M'Bour, Senegal
- Height: 1.88 m (6 ft 2 in)
- Position: Striker

Team information
- Current team: Udinese
- Number: 7

Youth career
- –2022: Génération Foot

Senior career*
Years	Team	Apps	(Gls)
2022–2025	Génération Foot	26	(12)
2025–2026	Metz	19	(5)
2025–2026	→ Udinese (loan)	19	(1)
2026–	Udinese	3	(1)

International career^{‡}
2023	Senegal U17	4	(3)
2023	Senegal	1	(0)
- * Club domestic league appearances and goals as of 25 May 2026 ‡ National team caps and goals as of 14:45, 15 September 2026 (UTC)

Idrissa Gueye (born 16 September 2006) is a Senegalese professional footballer who plays as a striker for Serie A club Udinese.

== Club career ==
Gueye won the Senegalese Ligue 1 title with Génération Foot in the 2022–23 season, at the age of 16. He went on to score twelve goals in twenty-six top-flight appearances with the club before his departure.

=== Metz ===
On 10 January 2025, Gueye signed a contract until June 2029 with French Ligue 2 club Metz, a partner of Génération Foot. He made his debut as a substitute in a 0–0 draw against Lorient the following day. He scored his first goal with a header in a 3–1 win over Paris FC on 18 January, restoring Metz's lead at 2–1. However, in the 72nd minute, a collision left him with injuries to his front teeth, forcing him to leave the match and be taken to the hospital. On 5 March, Gueye was voted Metz's Player of the Month for February by supporters, receiving 38% of the votes. On 8 March, he was named Ligue 2 Young Player of the Month for February.

==== Loan to Udinese ====
On 1 September 2025, Gueye joined Serie A side Udinese on loan with an obligation to buy.

== International career ==
Gueye made his debut for the senior Senegal national team in a 1–1 draw against Rwanda on 9 September 2023. At the 2023 FIFA U-17 World Cup in Indonesia, he scored a hat-trick in a group stage game against Poland, helping Senegal to a 4–1 win.

== Career statistics ==
=== Club ===
As of match played 14 September 2026

Appearances and goals by club, season and competition
Club	Season	League			National cup		Continental		Other		Total	
Club	Season	Division	Apps	Goals	Apps	Goals	Apps	Goals	Apps	Goals	Apps	Goals
Génération Foot	2022–23	Senegal Ligue 1	3	1	—		—		—		3	1
Génération Foot	2023–24	Senegal Ligue 1	23	11	—		2 (Note: Appearances in CAF Champions League)	1	—		25	12
Génération Foot	Total		26	12	—		2	1	—		28	13
Metz	2024–25	Ligue 2	17	5	0	0	—		3 (Note: Appearances in Ligue 1 relegation/promotion play-offs)	0	20	5
Metz	2025–26	Ligue 1	2	0	0	0	—		—		2	0
Metz	Total		19	5	0	0	—		3	0	22	5
Udinese (loan)	2025–26	Serie A	19	1	2	0	—		—		21	1
Udinese	2026–27	Serie A	3	1	2	0	—		—		5	1
Udinese	Total		22	2	4	0	—		—		26	2
Career total			67	19	4	0	2	1	3	0	76	20

=== International ===
As of match played 9 September 2023

Appearances and goals by national team and year
National team	Year	Apps	Goals
Senegal	2023	1	0
Total		1	0

== Honours ==
Génération Foot

- Senegal Ligue 1: 2022–23
