= Sheif Batte =

Ugandan footballer

Personal information
- Full name: Sheif Batte
- Place of birth: Uganda
- Positions: Forward; winger

Team information
- Current team: Buhimba United Saints FC

Youth career
- Stegotta FC

Senior career*
Years	Team	Apps	(Gls)
- Bright Stars FC
2018–2019	Maroons FC	14	(3)
2019–2020	Kyetume FC	8	(0)
2020–2021	UPDF FC	15	(0)
2021–2022	Gaddafi FC	9	(1)
2022–2023	SC Villa	22	(3)
2023–2024	Express FC	8	(0)
2024–2025	Sofapaka		
2025–	Buhimba United Saints FC		

International career
2018	Uganda	1	(0)
- * Club domestic league appearances and goals

Sheif Batte (born 25 October 1992) is a Ugandan professional footballer who plays as a left winger for Buhimba United Saints in the Uganda Premier League. He has represented the Uganda National Football Team and he was part of the squad for the 2018 African Nations Championship ( CHAN) held in Morocco.

== Early life ==
Batte grew up in Kazo, a suburb of Kampala, Uganda. He began playing football with the Super Eagles youth team in Kazo after he played in the Kampala Kids League and he joined Kazo Football Academy. He later played for Stegotta FC in the Kampala Regional League, where he scored 21 goals during the 2014/2015 season.

== Club career ==
Maroons Football Club

Batte joined Maroons Football club for one-year contract from his return from Bright Stars Football Club.

Kyetume Football Club

In 2019, Batte joined Kyetume football club on a one-year contract as a left winger where he played in 2019/2020 Football season.

Uganda People's Defence Force Football Club.

In October 2020, Batte signed a one-year contract with Uganda People's Defence Force FC after leaving Kyetume FC as a free agent following the expiry of his contract.

Gaddafi Football Club

In 2021, Batte joined Gaddafi Football Club on a one-year contract as a left winger and forward position where he made 9 appearances and scored 1 goal for the team in the 2021/2022 season.

SC Villa Football Club

Batte joined SC Villa Football Club where he played for a one-year contract as a centre forward. He was instrumental in SC Villa's win against Express Football Club on 5th March 2023 at muteesa II stadium wankulukuku.

Express Football Club

In 2023, Batte joined Express Football club on a one-year contract as a forward and a left winger in 2023/2024 season

Buhimba United Saints

In July 2025, Batte joined Buhimba United Saints FC as the club's first signing ahead of its debut season in the Uganda Premier League. He signed a two-year contract running until 2027.

== International career ==
Batte featured in the Uganda Cranes National Team Squad against Namibia in He featured for Uganda against Namibia during the tournament.the 2018 African Nations Championship which took place in morocco.

== See also ==
- Uganda Premier League
- Nelson Senkatuka
