= Mady Touré =

Senegalese footballer

Mady Touré is a Senegalese former footballer who is last known to have played as a striker for Brest. He is the founder of Senegalese football team Génération Foot.

== Playing career ==
As a player, Touré played for French Ligue 1 side Brest.

== Post-playing career ==
Touré founded Senegalese football team Génération Foot.
