= Djibril Diarra =

Senegalese association football player (born 2004)

Personal information
- Date of birth: 30 April 2004 (age 22)
- Place of birth: Kaolack, Senegal
- Height: 1.82 m (6 ft 0 in)
- Position: Midfielder

Team information
- Current team: Kalamata
- Number: 6

Youth career
- 2016–2023: Génération Foot

Senior career*
Years	Team	Apps	(Gls)
2023–2026	Seraing	46	(1)
2026–	Kalamata	5	(0)

International career
2023	Senegal U20	9	(0)
- * Club domestic league appearances and goals as of 20 September 2026

Djibril Diarra (born 30 April 2004) is a Senegalese professional footballer who plays as a midfielder for Super League Greece club Kalamata.

== Club career ==
A product of the Génération Foot football academy in Senegal, he spent seven years with them prior to his departure in 2023.

He joined Belgian club RFC Seraing in the summer of 2023. He was one of five players to move to the club from Generation Foot at that time. He made his debut for the club in the Challenger Pro League against K.M.S.K. Deinze on 17 September 2023.

On 11 July 2026, Diarra signed for Greek side Kalamata on a free transfer.

== International career ==
He played for Senegal at the 2022 African Nations Championship.
