= Isa Mubiru =

Ugandan footballer

Personal information
- Full name: Isa Mubiru
- Date of birth: October 10, 1996 (age 30)
- Place of birth: Kajjansi, Uganda
- Position: Left back

Team information
- Current team: KCCA FC

Youth career
- Zana Mixed School
- Agro Link Namasuba
- Buddo Secondary School
- St. Mary's Senior Secondary School
- Soana Junior Team

Senior career*
Years	Team	Apps	(Gls)
–2019	Tooro United (Soana FC)		
2019–2022	UPDF FC	19	(14)
2022–2023	Vipers SC		
2024–	KCCA FC		
- * Club domestic league appearances and goals as of 31 July 2025

Isa Mubiru (born 10 October 1996 ) is a Ugandan football player who plays as a defender for KCCA football club. He has previously played for UPDF FC and VIPERS SC. In 2020/2021 season, Mubiru won 2 pilsner man of the match accolades.

== Early life ==
Mubiru was born to Nulu Nakazzi ( mother) and Nsubuga Hamidu (father) in Kajjansi. He studied his primary education from Zana mixed school. He continued his education at the secondary level from Agro Link Namasuba, Buddo secondary school, and Zana mixed for his O' level. For his A' level education, Mubiru attended St.Mary's senior secondary school.

Mubiru started his career at a young age playing for the school football teams he attended during his primary and secondary level. He joined the soana junior team in the FUFA junior team and made it to the senior soana team in the Uganda premier league.

== Club career ==
=== Tooro United ===
Tooro United formerly known as Soana FC, was where Mubiru Isa began his professional career. He was the pillar for the club in defense and offense for two seasons.

=== UPDF FC ===
He joined Uganda People's Defence Force club ( UPDF) following the expiry of his contract at Tooro United. Over the course 19 matches, Mubiru soccered 14 goals. During the 2020-21 season he received 2 pilsner " man of the match accolades" one against Express and another against Busoga united.

=== VIPERS SC ===
Mubiru joined Vipers for the 2022/2023 season as a left back for the club giving him opportunity to further develop his defense skills.

=== KCCA FC ===
Mubiru transferred to KCCA FC after the 2023/2024 season at Vipers. He has signed a 2 years contract with KCCA FC for the year 2025-2026.

== See also ==
- Allan Okello
- Jamal Salim
