= Ronald Ssekiganda =

Ugandan footballer

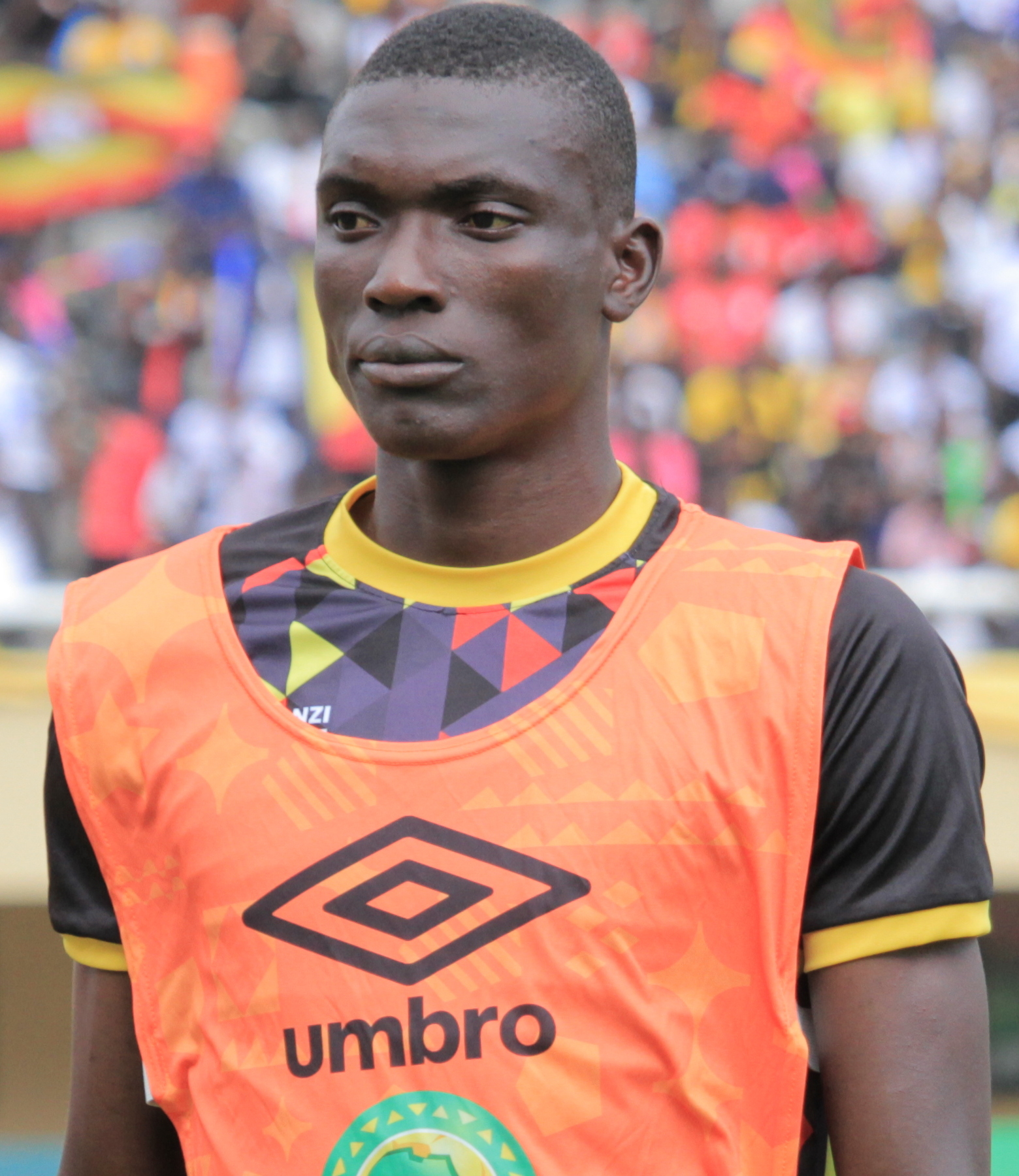
- Ssekiganda with Uganda in 2024

Personal information
- Full name: Ronald Ssekiganda
- Date of birth: 13 September 2003 (age 23)
- Place of birth: Kampala, Uganda
- Height: 1.95 m (6 ft 5 in)
- Position: Midfielder

Team information
- Current team: APR
- Number: 19

Senior career*
Years	Team	Apps	(Gls)
2015–2016	Lweza		
2016–2018	Proline		
2018–2020	Express		
2020–2021	KCCA		
2021–2025	Villa	40	(4)
2025–	APR	0	(0)

International career^{‡}
2024–	Uganda	10	(1)
- * Club domestic league appearances and goals as of 20:00, 16 January 2025 (UTC) ‡ National team caps and goals as of 20:00, 25 March 2025 (UTC)

Ronald Ssekiganda (born 13 September 2003) is a Ugandan professional footballer who plays as a midfielder for Rwanda Premier League club APR and the Uganda national team.

== Early life ==
Ronald Ssekiganda was born on September 13, 2003, in Kampala, Uganda. He attended St. Mary's Secondary School Kitende, where he developed his footballing skills and showcased his talent on the school's team.

== Club career ==
Ronald Ssekiganda's professional football journey has seen him play for several clubs in Uganda, contributing significantly to each team's midfield. He played for Lweza FC (2015–2016), Proline FC (2016–2018), Express FC (2018–2020), KCCA FC (2020–2021).

=== Villa ===
In 2021, Ssekiganda signed with Villa. In June 2023, he reaffirmed his commitment to the club by signing a new contract. At Villa, he has consistently worn jersey number 13.

== International career ==
Ronald Ssekiganda received his first call-up to the Uganda Cranes, the national football team, in 2021. He was included in the squad for the 2022 FIFA World Cup qualifiers and has since become a valuable asset to the team. His performances have highlighted the potential of home-based players, showcasing their capability to compete at the highest levels.

On December 7, 2025, he was selected by Paul Put for Uganda's squad to participate in the 2025 Africa Cup of Nations.

== Style of play ==
Ssekiganda is celebrated for his versatility in midfield, capable of excelling in both defensive and attacking roles. His ability to read the game, make crucial interceptions, and contribute to offensive plays makes him a key player for both his club and country. Off the pitch, Ssekiganda has been a vocal advocate for the recognition of home-based players, emphasizing their importance in the development of Ugandan football.

== Honours ==
=== Individual ===
- Airtel Masaza Cup MVP: 2019
