= Rogers Mato =

Ugandan footballer (born 2003)

- Mato in 2026

Personal information
- Full name: Rogers Mato Kassim
- Date of birth: 10 October 2003 (age 23)
- Place of birth: Uganda
- Height: 1.82 m (6 ft 0 in)
- Positions: Midfielder; forward

Team information
- Current team: Heart of Midlothian
- Number: 74

Youth career
- Lweza
- –2018: Maroons
- 2018–2019: Proline

Senior career*
Years	Team	Apps	(Gls)
2019–2021	Proline		
2021–2023	KCCA		
2023–2024	Şanlıurfaspor	5	(0)
2024	AP Brera	33	(4)
2025–2026	Vardar	26	(18)
2026	→ Heart of Midlothian (loan)	3	(0)
2026–	Heart of Midlothian	5	(0)

International career^{‡}
2022–	Uganda	42	(9)
- * Club domestic league appearances and goals as of 22 November 2026 ‡ National team caps and goals as of 24 September 2026

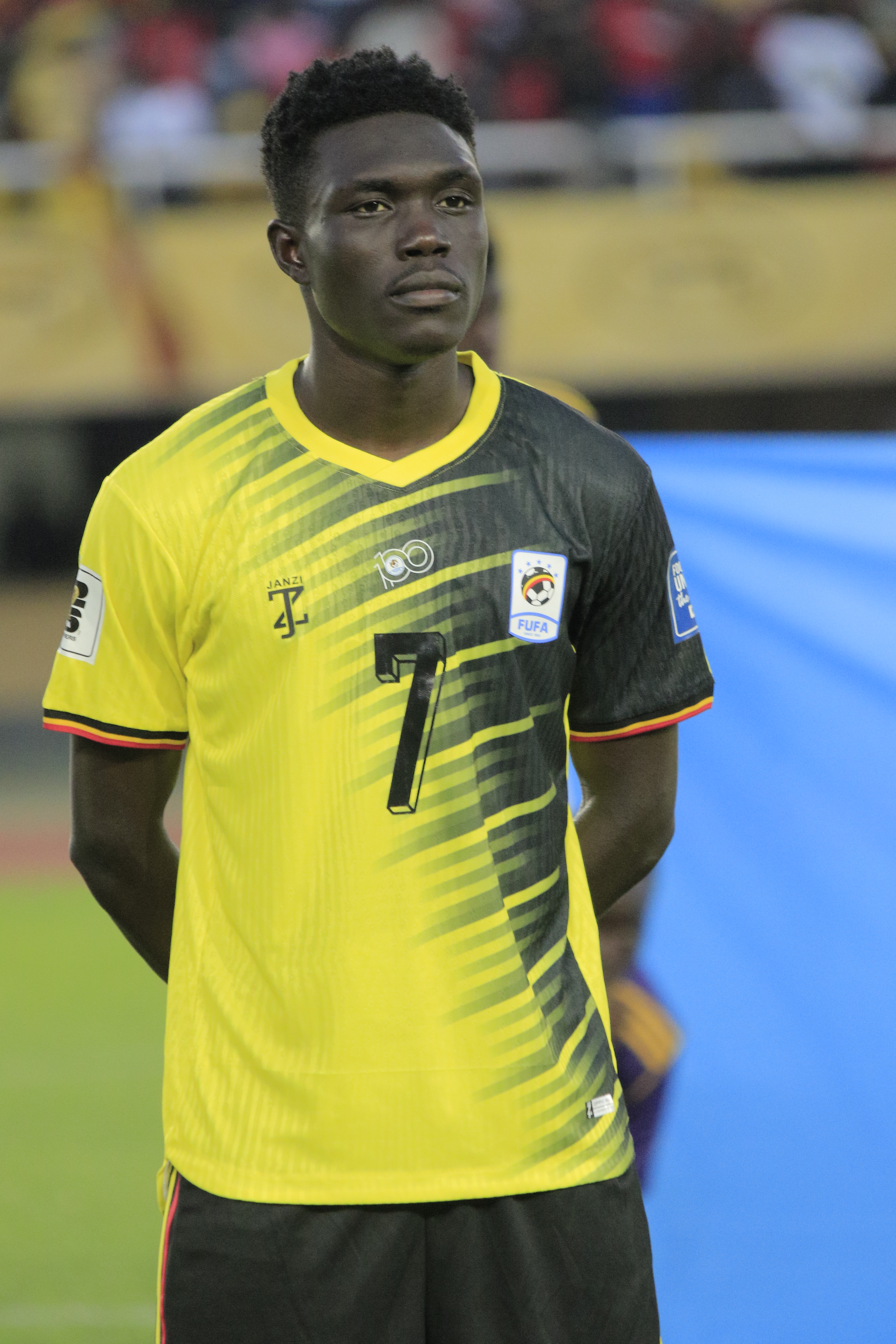
Mato with Uganda in 2025

Rogers Mato Kassim (born 10 October 2003) is a Ugandan professional footballer who plays for Scottish Premiership club Heart of Midlothian and the Uganda national team.

== Club career ==
As a youth Mato played for Lweza and Maroons in the Ugandan junior leagues. In 2018 he joined the youth setup of Proline of the FUFA Big League. For the 2019–20 season, Mato was promoted to the senior squad, but suffered relegation with the team during the season that was abandoned because of the COVID-19 pandemic. He became an important player for the club the following season, leading them to the promotion playoffs before coming short with a loss to Gaddafi. In September 2021 it was announced that the player had signed a four-year contract with 13-time Uganda Premier League champions KCCA for an undisclosed fee.

After a year with Şanlıurfaspor of the Turkish First League, Mato moved to AP Brera of North Macedonia's First Football League in February 2024. He made his competitive debut for the club on 18 February in a league fixture against Sileks.

On 13 January 2026, he signed a pre-contract with Scottish Premiership club Heart of Midlothian, initially joining on loan for the remainder of the 2025–26 season before permanently joining on a three-year deal.

== International career ==
In September 2021 Mato was called up to the senior national team for its 2022 FIFA World Cup qualification match against Rwanda. Two months later he featured for the national side in a practice match against a representative team from the Northern Region. Mato opened the scoring as the national side went on to win 3–1. In January 2022 he was called up again for five friendlies with national sides from Europe and Asia as the Cranes traveled to Turkey, Iraq, and Bahrain. He went on to make his senior debut in the first match against Iceland on 12 January 2022. He started and played eighty minutes in the eventual 1–1 draw.

On December 7, 2025, he was selected by Paul Put for Uganda's squad to participate in the 2025 Africa Cup of Nations.

== Career statistics ==
As of match played 24 September 2026

Appearances and goals by national team and year
National team	Year	Apps	Goals
Uganda	2022	9	1
Uganda	2023	12	2
Uganda	2024	10	1
Uganda	2025	10	4
Uganda	2026	1	1
Total		42	9

Scores and results list Uganda's goal tally first, score column indicates score after each Mato goal.

List of international goals scored by Rogers Mato
No.	Date	Venue	Opponent	Score	Result	Competition
1	3 September 2022	St. Mary's Stadium, Entebbe, Uganda	Tanzania	3–0	3–0	2022 African Nations Championship qualification
2	28 March 2023	National Stadium, Dar es Salaam, Tanzania	Tanzania	1–0	1–0	2023 Africa Cup of Nations qualification
3	21 November 2023	Berkane Municipal Stadium, Berkane, Morocco	Somalia	1–0	1–0	2026 FIFA World Cup qualification
4	6 September 2024	Orlando Stadium, Johannesburg, South Africa	South Africa	2–2	2–2	2025 Africa Cup of Nations qualification
5	9 June 2025	Marrakesh Stadium, Marrakesh, Morocco	Gambia	1–0	1–1	Friendly
6	5 September 2025	Mandela National Stadium, Kampala, Uganda	Mozambique	2–0	4–0	2026 FIFA World Cup qualification
7	5 September 2025	Mandela National Stadium, Kampala, Uganda	Mozambique	3–0	4–0	2026 FIFA World Cup qualification
8	30 December 2025	Fez Stadium, Fez, Morocco	Nigeria	1–3	1–3	2025 Africa Cup of Nations
9	24 September 2026	Hammadi Agrebi Stadium, Radès, Tunisia	Tunisia	1–1	1–1	2027 Africa Cup of Nations qualification
