= James Begisa =

Ugandan footballer

Personal information
- Full name: James Penza Begisa
- Date of birth: September 27, 2002 (age 24)
- Position: Right-back

Team information
- Current team: URA FC

Senior career*
Years	Team	Apps	(Gls)
2019–2020	Proline FC	21	(1)
2020–2022	UPDF FC	37	(2)
2022–	URA FC	48	(2)

International career^{‡}
2021	Uganda U20		
2021–	Uganda	3	(0)
- * Club domestic league appearances and goals as of 30 June 2024 ‡ National team caps and goals as of 30 June 2024

James Penza Begisa (born 27 September 2002) is a Ugandan professional footballer who plays as a defender for URA FC in the Uganda Premier League and the Uganda national football team.

== Club career ==
Begisa started his professional career with Proline FC in the 2019–20 Uganda Premier League season, making 21 appearances and scored one goal.

He later joined UPDF FC where he played two seasons between 2020 and 2022, making over 30 league appearances. While at UPDF, he was recognized as one of the Uganda Premier League’s best right-backs.

In July 2022, Begisa signed a two-year contract with URA FC, becoming the club’s second signing of the window. He renewed his contract in June 2024 despite interest from Vipers SC and KCCA FC.

== International career ==
Begisa was part of the Uganda U20 squad that finished runners-up at the 2021 Africa U-20 Cup of Nations in Mauritania.

He made his debut for the senior Uganda national football team in 2021 and has since earned three international caps.

== Career statistics ==
Club

Season	Club	League apps	Goals
2019–20	Proline	21	1
2020–21	UPDF	10	1
2021–22	UPDF	27	1
2022–23	URA	27	2
2023–24	URA	21	0

International
As of 30 June 2024

- Senior team: 3 caps, 0 goals.

== Honours ==
Uganda national football team U20

- Africa U-20 Cup of Nations runner-up: 2021
