= Jack Komakech =

Ugandan association footballer

Personal information
- Full name: Jack Komakech
- Date of birth: July 31, 2002 (age 24)
- Place of birth: Gulu District, Uganda
- Height: 1.83 m (6 ft 0 in)
- Position: Goalkeeper

Team information
- Current team: Vipers SC
- Number: 19

Youth career
- Ascent Soccer Academy

Senior career*
Years	Team	Apps	(Gls)
2021–	Vipers SC		(0)

International career
- Uganda U17
- Uganda U20
2021	Uganda	1	(0)
- * Club domestic league appearances and goals

Jack Komakech (born July 31, 2002) is a Uganda professional football player who plays as a goalkeeper currently playing for Vipers SC and also the Uganda National Men's Football team (Uganda Cranes). He won Fortebet Real Stars Monthly Accolade for February 2021.

== Early life and education ==
Komakech was born to Billy Okot and Achira Florence Okot in Gulu District, Northern Uganda. He went to Ascent Soccer Academy where he became the first-choice goalkeeper for the Uganda U-17 and U-20 National Teams. He also attended Kings Way High School in Entebbe for his secondary school education before join St. Mary's Senior Secondary School.

== Football career ==
Komakech started his football career with Ascent Soccer Academy before join U-17 and U-20 National Teams. Komakech signed a contract with Vipers SC aa head of 2021/2022 season replacing Sekajja Bashir.

== Awards and recognition ==
- Fortebet Real Stars Monthly Accolade – February 2021
- Excelled during U‑20 AFCON: two clean sheets, only three goals conceded, pivotal penalty save vs Burkina Faso.
- Awarded at Route 256 in Kampala; accepted by his mother Achira Florence, who at first discouraged football in favor of studies.
