= Joel Mutakubwa =

Ugandan footballer (born 2002)

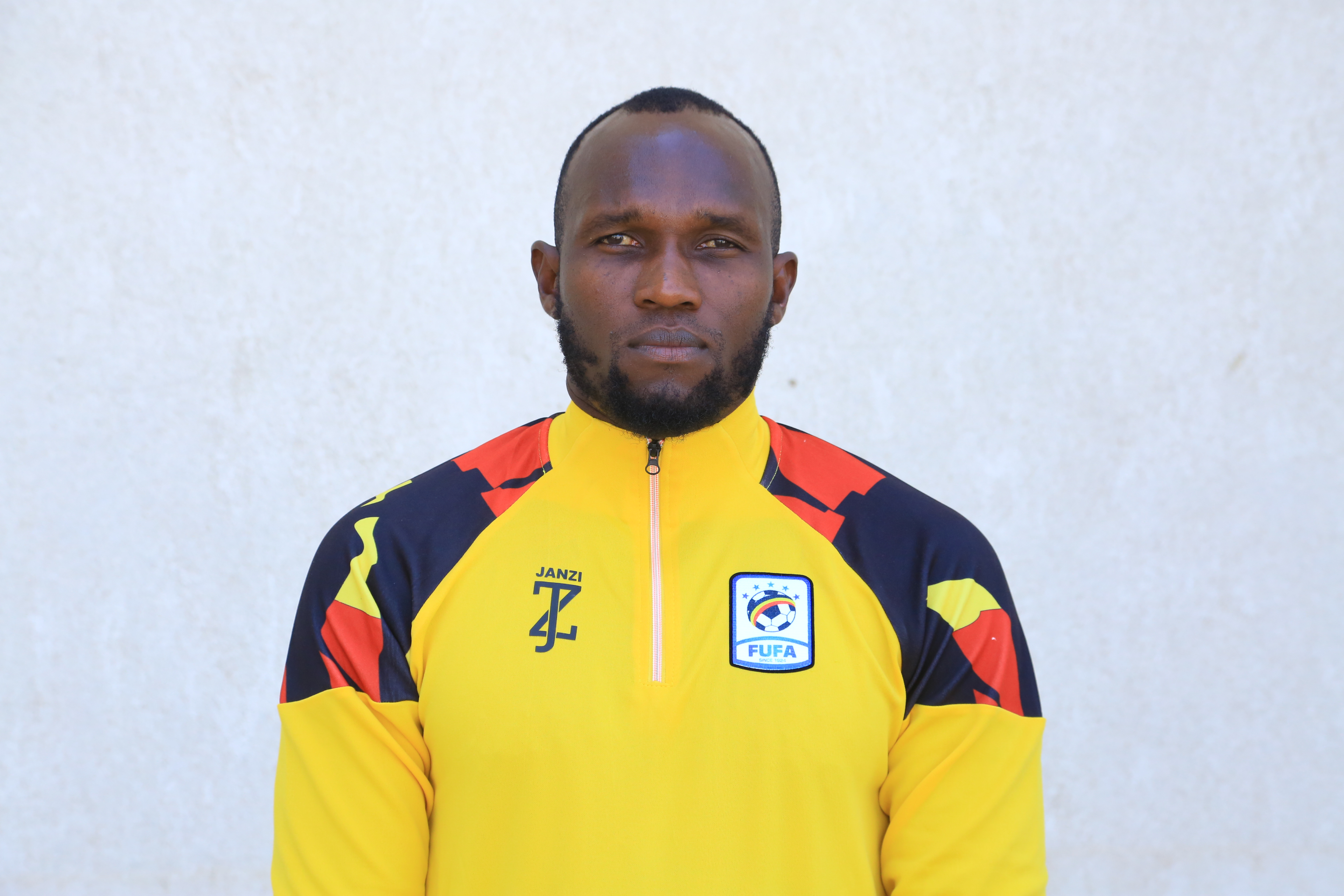

Personal information
- Date of birth: 17 July 1994 (age 32)
- Height: 1.79 m (5 ft 10 in)
- Position: Goalkeeper

Team information
- Current team: BUL Jinja FC

Senior career*
Years	Team	Apps	(Gls)
- Busoga United FC
- Kyetume FC
- Tooro United FC
2021-2023	Express FC		
2023-Present	BUL Jinja FC		
- →

International career
- Uganda
- * Club domestic league appearances and goals as of 13 August 2025

Joel Mutakubwa (born 17 July 1994) is a Ugandan professional footballer who plays as a goalkeeper for BUL FC which plays in the Uganda Premier League.

He has represented the Uganda national football team at the 2024 African Nations Championship (CHAN 2024), held in Uganda, Kenya, and Tanzania.

== Club career ==
Mutakubwa has played for Busoga United FC (Kirinya Jinja SS), Kyetume FC, Tooro United FC and Express FC. He won the CECAFA Kagame Cup with Express FC in 2021.

=== BUL FC ===
Mutakubwa signed for the Uganda Premier League club BUL FC on a two-year contract in 2023.

== Honours ==
=== Express FC ===
- CECAFA Kagame Cup 2021

=== Individual ===
- Goalkeeper for the month of January at the Real Sports Awards after keeping three cleansheets for Tooro United FC.
