= Nafian Alionzi =

Ugandan footballer

Nafian Alionzi Legason
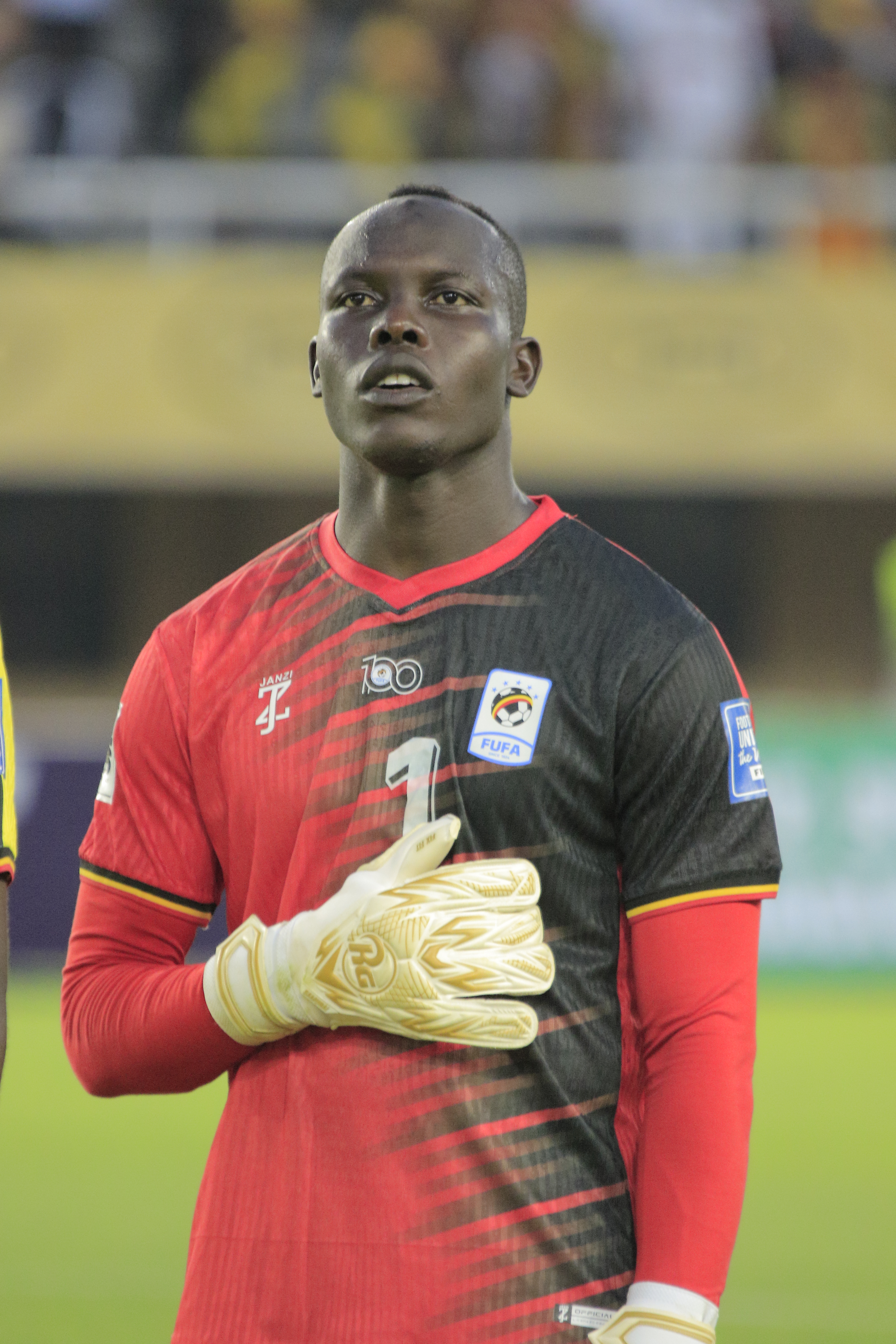
- Alionzi with Uganda in 2025

Personal information
- Full name: Legasson Nafian Alionzi Alionzi
- Date of birth: 2 March 1996 (age 30)
- Place of birth: Adjumani, Uganda
- Height: 1.97 m (6 ft 6 in)
- Position: Goalkeeper

Team information
- Current team: Defence Force
- Number: 1

Youth career
- Onduparaka FC

Senior career*
Years	Team	Apps	(Gls)
–2016	Onduparaka FC		
2016–2023	URA FC	26	
2023–	Defence Force	19	(0)

International career
2021–	Uganda	6	(0)
- * Club domestic league appearances and goals

Legasson Nafian Alionzi Alionzi (born 2 March 1996) is a Ugandan professional footballer who plays as a goalkeeper for Ethiopian Premier League club Defence Force and the Uganda national team.

== Early life ==
Alionzi was born in West Nile, Adjumani District, Uganda.

== Club career ==
Alionzi's football career begun in West Nile with Onduparaka FC.

He was also the goalkeeper of the West Nile Province team at the FUFA Drum Inter-Provinces tournament.

=== Onduparaka FC ===
Alionizi played for Onduparaka FC when it was promoted from the FUFA Big League to Uganda Premier League.

=== URA FC ===
Alionzi joined URA FC from Onduparaka FC in 2016 where he had played for 7 years. He left URA in 2023 after 26 appearances and 12 clean sheets in the Uganda Premier League.

=== Mekelakeya SC ===
Alionzi moved to Ethiopian Higher League club Defence Force in 2023 on a one-year contract.

== International career ==
Alionzi made his debut on the Uganda national team in 2021. He was named as one of the goalkeepers for the 2026 FIFA World Cup qualifiers.

On December 7, 2025, he was selected by Paul Put for Uganda's squad to participate in the 2025 Africa Cup of Nations.
