= Cheikhou Ndiaye =

Senegalese footballer (born 2002)

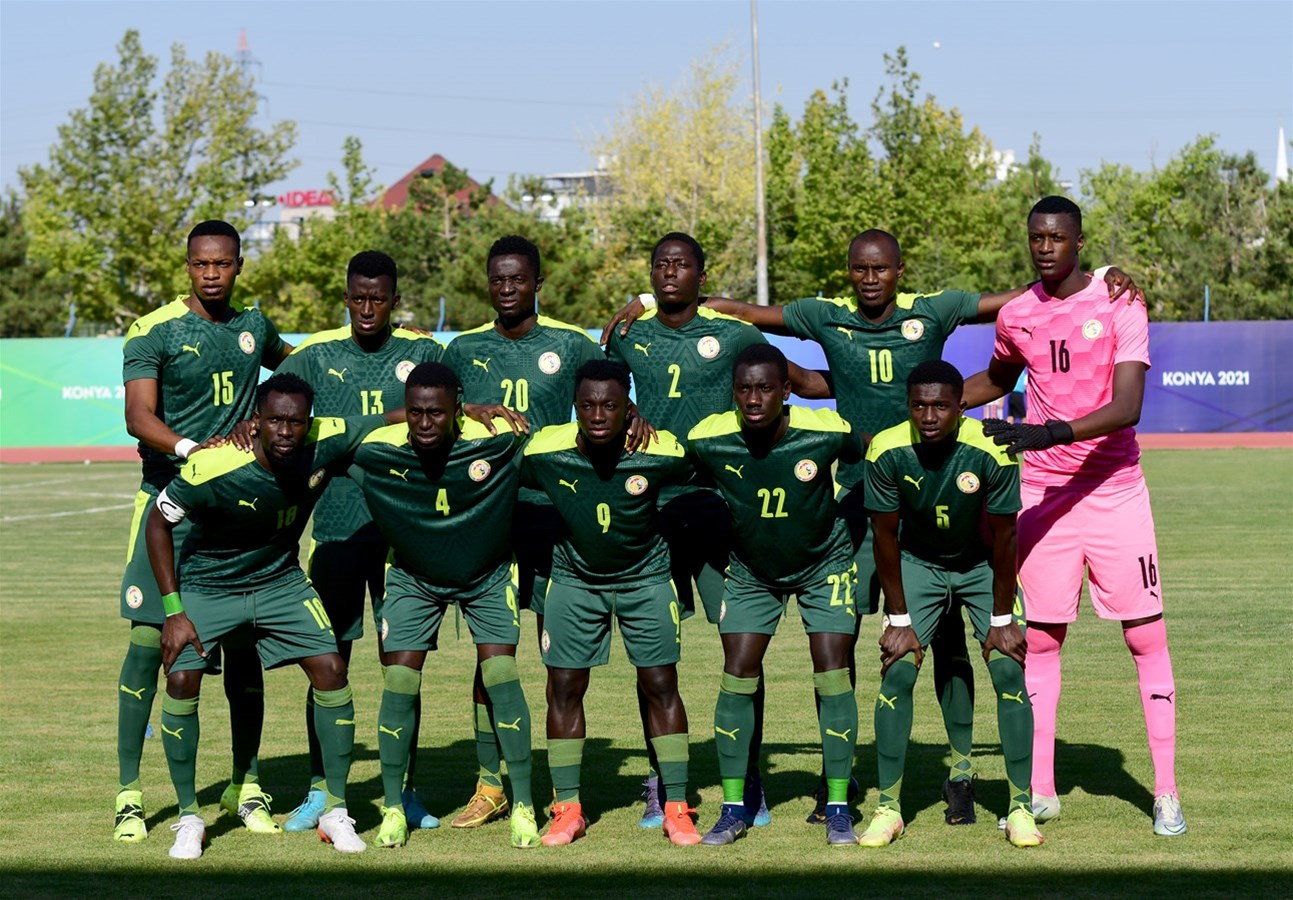
- Cheikhou Ndiaye (22) with his team at the 2021 Islamic Solidarity Games

Personal information
- Full name: Cheikhou Omar Ndiaye
- Date of birth: 25 January 2002 (age 24)
- Place of birth: Kaolack, Senegal
- Height: 1.79 m (5 ft 10 1/2 in)
- Position: Defender

Youth career
- –2023: Génération Foot

Senior career*
Years	Team	Apps	(Gls)
2023–2026	Seraing	48	(0)

International career^{‡}
2022–	Senegal	13	(0)
- * Club domestic league appearances and goals as of 20 April 2026 ‡ National team caps and goals as of 09:06, 13 March 2025 (UTC)

Cheikhou Omar Ndiaye (born 25 January 2002) is a Senegalese professional footballer who plays as a defender.

== Early life ==
From Kaolack, he joined the Génération Foot football academy in Senegal in 2018.

== Club career ==
A product of the Génération Foot Academy in Senegal, he joined Belgian club RFC Seraing in the summer of 2023, one of five from the Academy to make the move at that time.

He made his debut for Seraing in the Challenger Pro League on 2 September 2023 against KV Oostende. During the 2023-24 season he became a regular starter for the team in defence.

== International career ==
He captained Senegal at U17 and U20 level. With Senegal, he won the 2022 African Nations Championship (CHAN).
