= Hilary Mukundane =

Ugandan footballer (born 2001)

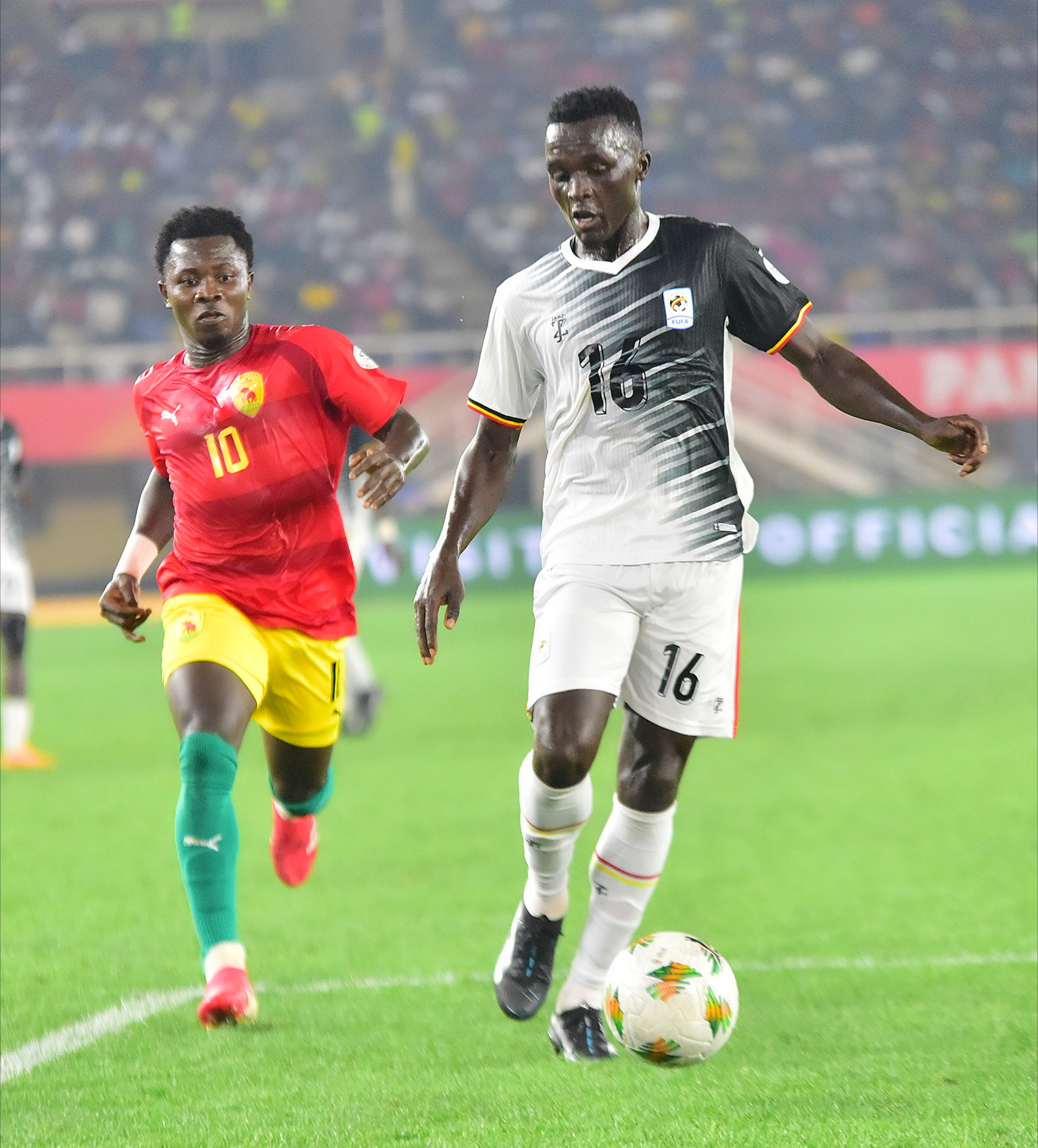
- Mukundane in 2025

Personal information
- Full name: Hilary Panuel Mukundane
- Date of birth: 9 December 2001 (age 24)
- Place of birth: Kyeizooba, Igala Bushenyi District
- Position: Centre-back

Team information
- Current team: Vipers SC
- Number: 16

Youth career
- Kitagata Secondary School
- Bishop Stuart University

Senior career*
| Years | Team | Apps | (Gls) |
| 2015 | Kamoma FC | | |
| 2016 | Ntonda FC | | |
| 2017–2022 | Mbarara City FC | | |
| 2022– | Vipers SC | | |

International career^{‡}
| 2022– | Uganda | 10 | (0) |
- * Club domestic league appearances and goals ‡ National team caps and goals as of 16 June 2026

Hilary Panuel Mukundane (born 9 December 2001) is a Ugandan footballer who plays as a centre-back for Vipers SC and the Uganda national team.

He was nominated for the Airtel FUFA Male Player of the Year 2019, won the Pilsner Uganda Premier League Defender of the 2022–23 season, and was voted on the Male Best XI - 2024 MTN FUFA Awards.

== Early life and education ==
Hilary was born with two sisters and three brothers in Kyeizooba, Igala Bushenyi District, by Mrs. Winnie Karukiiko, and Mr. Benet Karukiiko.

He studied from Bugonji Modern Primary School up to Primary six (P.6), he then completed his primary leaving examinations (P.L.E) at Mweguri Primary School. He went for his O-Level at Bugongi Secondary School and finished his Uganda Certificate of Education (UCE) at Vine High School.

He then went for his A-Level at Kitagata Secondary School and later graduated at Bishop Stuart University.

== Career ==
Mukundane started his football career in A-level at Kitagata Secondary School and later played for Bishop Stuart University.

In 2015, he started his club career at Kamoma FC in the Western Region League, he later joined Ntonda FC in 2016. For the 2016–17 season he joined Mbarara City FC in the FUFA Big League where he helped his club be promoted to the Uganda Premier League after knocking out Synergy FC in the playoff final at Startimes Stadium, Lugogo with a win of 2–1. He later became the captain of the club up to when he left the team.

In 2021, Mukundane was summoned in the Uganda under-23 national team (Uganda Kobs), provisional 40-man squad for the 2021 CECAFA senior challenge cup that was played on 3 to 18 July 2021 hosted by Ethiopia under Morley Byekwaso as the head coach.

In the mid 2021–22 transfer window, Mukundane joined Vipers SC and signed a three year deal on an undisclosed fee. In August 2023 Mukundane damaged his posterior cruciate ligament while playing for Vipers SC against Jwaneng Galaxy F.C. in Botswana in the CAF Champions League, and this injury kept him out for three weeks.

== Honours ==
Mukundane was nominated for the Airtel FUFA Male Player of the Year 2019 while in Mbarara City FC.

He was voted on the Male Best XI - 2024 MTN FUFA Awards.

He won the Pilsner Uganda Premier League Defender of the 2022–23 season.
