= Frank Ssebuufu =

Ugandan footballer (born 2004)

Personal information
- Date of birth: 9 September 2001 (age 25)
- Place of birth: Uganda
- Height: 1.95 m (6 ft 5 in)
- Position: Forward

Youth career
- 2018: Kiboga Young
- 2019: Masaka City SC
- 2020–2021: Lungujja Galaxy

Senior career*
Years	Team	Apps	(Gls)
2021–2023	Wakiso Giants FC	47	(6)
2023–2024	New York Red Bulls II	52	(9)

International career
2023–	Uganda	3	(0)
- * Club domestic league appearances and goals as of 17:30, 18 August 2025 (UTC)

Frank Ssebuufu (born 9 September 2001) is a Ugandan professional footballer who plays as a forward.

== Club career ==
=== Early career ===
Born in Uganda, Ssebuufu's career began with lower league clubs Kiboga Young in 2018, he had a short stint in Masaka before signing for Lungujja Galaxy prior to joining Wakiso Giants FC.

=== Wakiso Giants ===
In 2021 Ssebuufu signed with Uganda Premier League club Wakiso Giants FC. On 7 May 2021, Ssebuufu scored his first goal for Wakiso Giants in a 5–0 victory over Simba FC.

On 30 October 2021, Ssebuufu scored an 87th-minute goal, leading Wakiso to a 1–0 victory over Busoga United FC at the Kabaka Kyabaggu Stadium.

On 29 November 2022, Ssebuufu scored a brace for Wakiso in a 3–2 victory over Express FC.

=== New York Red Bulls II ===
On 24 March 2023, Ssebuufu's move to New York was finalized, as he signed with MLS Next Pro side New York Red Bulls II. On 14 May 2023, Ssebuufu scored his first goal with New York Red Bulls II in a 2–0 derby victory over New York City FC II.

== International career ==
Ssebuufu was named in Uganda's 2022 African Nations Championship squad by coach Milutin Sredojević. Ssebuufu made his competitive debut for Uganda on 14 January 2023 in a 2022 African Nations Championship match against Congo. Ssebuufu started the match wearing the #9 jersey in a 0–0 draw.

== Career statistics ==
As of match played 6 October 2024

Appearances and goals by club, season and competition
Club	Season	League			National cup (Note: Includes U.S. Open Cup)		Continental		Other		Total	
Club	Season	Division	Apps	Goals	Apps	Goals	Apps	Goals	Apps	Goals	Apps	Goals
Wakiso Giants FC	2020–21	Uganda Premier League	8	1	0	0	0	0	—		8	1
Wakiso Giants FC	2021–22	Uganda Premier League	24	2	0	0	0	0	—		24	2
Wakiso Giants FC	2022–23	Uganda Premier League	15	3	0	0	0	0	0	0	15	3
Wakiso Giants FC	Total		47	6	0	0	0	0	0	0	47	6
New York Red Bulls II	2023	MLS Next Pro	26	8	0	0	—		2 (Note: Appearances in MLS Next Pro play-offs)	1	28	9
New York Red Bulls II	2024	MLS Next Pro	26	1	1	0	—		0	0	27	1
New York Red Bulls II	Total		52	9	1	0	0	0	2	1	55	10
Career total			99	15	1	0	0	0	2	1	102	16
