= Geoffrey Wasswa =

Ugandan footballer (born 1996)

Geofrey Wasswa
Personal information
- Date of birth: 23 August 1996 (age 30)
- Place of birth: Buikwe, Uganda
- Height: 1.85 m (6 ft 1 in)
- Position: Defender

Team information
- Current team: Ethiopian Coffee
- Number: 20

Youth career
- 2015–2016: Vipers SC Academy

Senior career*
Years	Team	Apps	(Gls)
2016–2020	Vipers	104	(11)
2021–2023	SC Villa	10	(1)
2023–	Ethiopian Coffee	23	(2)
- * Club domestic league appearances and goals as of 20:47, 11 May 2023 (UTC) ‡ National team caps and goals as of 20:47, 5 January 2020 (UTC)

Geofrey Wasswa is a Ugandan professional footballer who plays as a defender for Ethiopian Premier League club Ethiopian Coffee and the Uganda national team.

== Youth career ==
Wasswa started his football career as a kid in Haka Academy where he advanced to school football when he joined secondary school at St Mary's Kitende he was voted Eastern best player in the Airtel Raising Stars football championship. During his school days at St Marys Kitende, Wasswa won several Copa Coca-Cola championships for the school and East Africa school championships.

== Club career ==
=== Vipers SC ===
He joined Vipers SC in 2015 at age 16. He played 72 games and scored 8 goals, in the 2015–16 Wasswa was part of the Junior team but as well playing for the Senior Team. wasswa fully made his debut for Vipers SC Senior team in 2016 against Bul FC at Nakivubo stadium a game Vipers SC won 1-0

His has won several titles with Vipers Vipers SC 2018 Uganda Premier League.

In the 2016–17 season, he won the Uganda Cup for Vipers sc and was nominated Uganda most promising talented player by Azam the league sponsors. He played 18 games.

Wasswa Geoffrey has featured for Vipers SC on the continental level and played several games in both CAF Confederations Cup and CAF Champions League against El Merrichk of Sudan and against CS Constantaine of Algeria both home and away.

=== SC Villa ===
Wasswa signed for SC Villa in January 2021. On his debut against Ndejje University F.C, he scored from the spot helping his new club cruise into the round of the Uganda Cup.

== International career ==
At age 18, Wasswa Geoffrey started playing for the Under age teams in several categories, COSAFA U-20 Zambia vs Uganda, Lesthoso vs Uganda, Zimbabwe vs Uganda and Uganda vs Egypt.

Wasswa Geoffrey has received a call-up to the Uganda national team from coach Sébastien Desabre in March 2018 during the international break but didn't make the cut for the final squad but as well being monitored by the Cranes technical team.
