= 19 May 1956 Stadium =

Football stadium in Annaba, Algeria

- Annaba Stadium
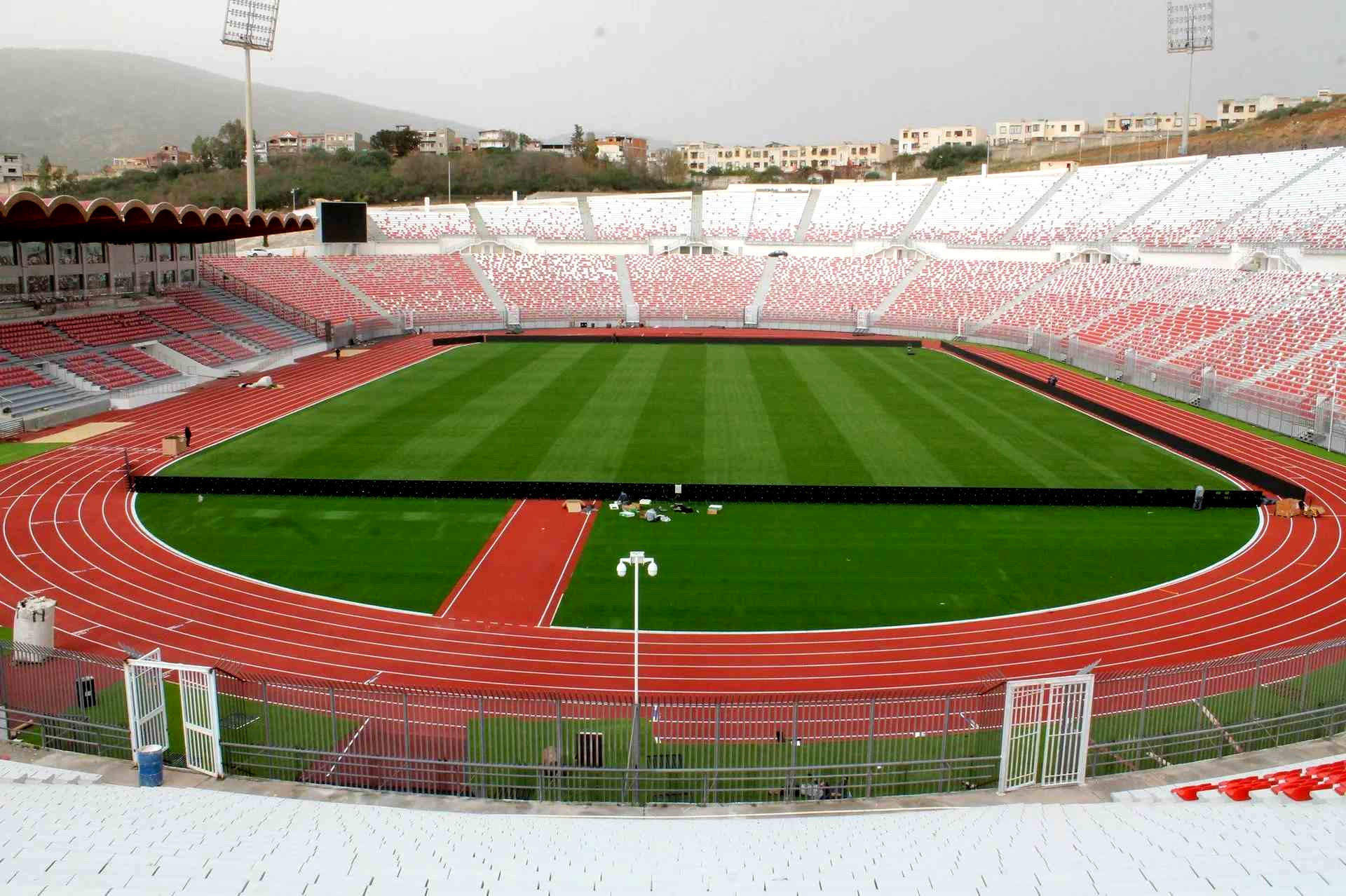
- Interactive map of 19 May 1956 Stadium
- Full name: 19 May 1956 Stadium
- Location: Annaba, Algeria
- Coordinates: 36.8858°N 7.7331°E
- Capacity: 56,000
- Surface: FLexGrass Hybrid grass
- Scoreboard: Yes

Construction
- Built: 1987
- Opened: July 10, 1987
- Renovated: 2022

19 May 1956 Stadium (Arabic: ملعب 19 ماي 1956), or simply May 19th Stadium is a football stadium located in Annaba, Algeria.The stadium has a capacity of 56,000 and is all-seated. It is currently used on a regular basis by football club USM Annaba who play in the Algerian Ligue Professionnelle 2. It is also occasionally used by the Algeria national football team.

== History ==
On June 10, 1987, the stadium was inaugurated with a match between the Algerian national football team and Sudan. Sudanese international Kamel Mohammed was the first person to score in the stadium, scoring in the 15th minute of the game. The first Algerian to score in the stadium was Djamel Menad, who scored in the 85th minute of the same game. Algeria won the game 3–1. The stadium hosted several matches during the 1990 African Cup of Nations.

The most recent game played there was Algeria's 1–0 win over Morocco during the 2012 African Cup of Nations Qualification, with the only goal being scored by Hassan Yebda from the penalty spot. It was the only victory during Benchika's reign as the Algerian manager, and it was done before a sell-out crowd.

On March 5, 2012, Mohamed Raouraoua, the president of the FAF in Algeria, stated that the stadium might become the official stadium for the CAF U-20 tournament which will be played in Algeria.

== Tenants and events ==
=== 2022 African Nations Championship ===
the stadium was one of four stadiums that have been appointed to host the 2022 African Nations Championship, it hosted 5 games in Group B and one game in Group A and one game in the quarter-finals, this was the first major international competition that this stadium hosted since the 1990 African Cup of Nations.

Date	Local time	Team No. 1	Result	Team No. 2	Round
14 January 2023	17:00	DR Congo	0–0	Uganda	Group B
14 January 2023	20:00	Ivory Coast	0–1	Senegal	Group B
18 January 2023	17:00	DR Congo	0–0	Ivory Coast	Group B
18 January 2023	20:00	Senegal	0–1	Uganda	Group B
21 January 2023	20:00	Libya	3–1	Ethiopia	Group A
22 January 2023	20:00	Senegal	3–0	DR Congo	Group B
27 January 2023	20:00	Senegal	1–0	Mauritania	Quarter-finals

== See also ==
- List of football stadiums in Algeria
- List of African stadiums by capacity
- List of association football stadiums by capacity
