= Miché Mika =

Congolese footballer

Personal information
- Full name: Miché Mika
- Date of birth: 16 September 1996 (age 30)
- Place of birth: Kinshasa, Zaire
- Height: 1.70 m (5 ft 7 in)
- Position: Attacking midfielder

Team information
- Current team: FC Saint-Éloi Lupopo

Senior career*
Years	Team	Apps	(Gls)
2012	Jogari		
2013–2016	CS Don Bosco		
2016–2021	TP Mazembe		
2022–	FC Saint-Éloi Lupopo		

International career^{‡}
2016–	DR Congo	24	(0)
- * Club domestic league appearances and goals ‡ National team caps and goals as of 18 February 2026

Miché Mika (born 16 September 1996) is a Congolese professional footballer who plays as a midfielder for FC Saint-Éloi Lupopo and the DR Congo national football team.
