= Baggio Siadi =

DR Congolese footballer

Personal information
- Birth name: Baggio Siadi Ngusia
- Date of birth: July 21, 1997 (age 29)
- Place of birth: Kinshasa, DR Congo
- Height: 1.80 m (5 ft 11 in)
- Position: Goalkeeper

Youth career
- FC Patronage
- FC Pibol

Senior career*
Years	Team	Apps	(Gls)
2014–2018	DCMP Imana		
2018–2020	AS Nyuki		
2020–2021	Groupe Bazano		
2021–2026	TP Mazembe	38	(0)

International career
2019-	DR Congo A'	8	(0)
2021-	DR Congo	3	(0)
- * Club domestic league appearances and goals

Baggio Siadi Ngusia (born 21 July 1997) is a Congolese professional footballer who plays as a goalkeeper the DR Congo national team.

== Career ==
Siadi is a youth product of FC Patronage and FC Pibol, and began his senior career in the Linafoot in 2014 with DCMP Imana. In 2018 he moved to AS Nyuki, and after two seasons there had a year-long stint with Groupe Bazano. On 22 July 2021, he moved to TP Mazembe on a 5-year contract. The following season he helped TP Mazembe win the 2021–22 Linafoot competition. He left the team as his contract expired on 30 June 2026.

== International ==
Siadi debuted with the senior DR Congo national team in a 3–2 friendly loss to Rwanda on 18 September 2019. He was part of the DR Congo squad that played at the 2020 and 2022 African Nations Championship. He was then part of the final squad that went to 2023 Africa Cup of Nations.

== Career statistics ==
=== Club ===
As of match played 24 May 2026

Appearances and goals by club, season and competition
Club	Season	League			National cup		League cup		Continental		Total	
Club	Season	Division	Apps	Goals	Apps	Goals	Apps	Goals	Apps	Goals	Apps	Goals
TP Mazembe	2021–22 Linafoot	Linafoot	8	0	―		―		5 (Note: Appearances in CAF Champions League)	0	13	0
TP Mazembe	2022–23	Linafoot	11	0	―		―		3 (Note: Appearances in CAF Confederation Cup)	0	14	0
TP Mazembe	2023–24	Linafoot	9	0	―		―		2 (Note: Appearances in African Football League)	0	11	0
TP Mazembe	2024–25	Linafoot	8	0	0	0	―		0	0	8	0
TP Mazembe	2025–26	Linafoot	2	0	―		―		―		2	0
Career total			38	0	0	0	0	0	10	0	48	0

=== International ===
As of match played 10 February 2024

Appearances and goals by national team and year
National team	Year	Apps	Goals
DR Congo	2021	2	0
DR Congo	2023	1	0
Total		3	0

Appearances and goals by national team and year
National team	Year	Apps	Goals
DR Congo A'	2019	2	0
DR Congo A'	2021	1	0
DR Congo A'	2022	2	0
DR Congo A'	2023	3	0
Total		7	0

== Honours ==
TP Mazembe

- Linafoot: 2021–22, 2023–24, 2025–26
