= Hervé Lomboto =

Congolese footballer (born 1989)

Personal information
- Full name: Hervé Nguemba Lomboto
- Date of birth: 27 October 1989 (age 37)
- Place of birth: Kinshasa, Zaire
- Height: 1.79 m (5 ft 10 in)
- Position: Goalkeeper

Team information
- Current team: Motema Pembe

Senior career*
Years	Team	Apps	(Gls)
2009–2012	Amazone Kimbanseke		
2012–2016	Vita Club		
2016	AC Léopards		
2016–2019	Vita Club		
2019–2020	CS Don Bosco		
2020–2021	Dauphins Noirs		
2021–	Motema Pembe		

International career
2013–	DR Congo	6	(0)
- * Club domestic league appearances and goals as of 3 August 2019

Hervé Nguemba Lomboto (born 27 October 1989) is a Congolese professional footballer who plays as goalkeeper for Motema Pembe and the DR Congo national team.

== Professional career ==
Lomboto began his career with Amazone Kimbanseke in the DR Congo, and in 2012 moved to Vita Club. He had a brief stint with AC Léopards in the Republic of the Congo in 2013, before returning to Vita Club. He followed that up with spells at CS Don Bosco and Dauphins Noirs, before signing with Motema Pembe on 2 February 2021.

== International career ==
Lomboto made his debut with the DR Congo national team in a 2–1 2014 African Nations Championship qualification win over Congo on 7 July 2013.
