= Ibrahim Orit =

Ugandan footballer (born 1998)

Personal information
- Date of birth: 28 July 1998 (age 28)
- Place of birth: Soroti, Uganda
- Height: 1.86 m (6 ft 1 in)
- Position: Winger

Team information
- Current team: BUL FC
- Number: 8

Senior career*
Years	Team	Apps	(Gls)
2013–2014	Odudwi		
2014–2015	Soroti Garage		
2015–2016	Junior Eagles		
2016–2017	Future Stars		
2017–2020	Mbarara City		
2020–	Vipers SC		
2023-	Arua Hill SC		
2024-2026	BUL FC		

International career^{‡}
2021–	Uganda	14	(2)
- * Club domestic league appearances and goals as of 23:48, 14 February 2021 (UTC) ‡ National team caps and goals as of 23:48, 28 July 2026 (UTC)

Ibrahim Orit (born 28 July 1998) is a Ugandan footballer who has been playing for BUL FC as a winger in the recently concluded 2025/26 Startimes Uganda Premier league and the Uganda national football team.

== Early life ==
Orit was born in Soroti Hospital, Soroti, Uganda, as the second born in a family of six, though both his parents died in Orit's early childhood. He attended Aloet Primary School, but had to drop out of education following the passing of his parents as there was no money to pay his school fees.

== Club career ==
Orit started his career at Odudwi FC in Uganda's fourth tier in 2013, and had spells at Soroti Garage, Junior Eagles and Future Stars before signing for Uganda Premier League side Mbarara City in summer 2017. On 2 July 2020, it was announced that Orit had joined Ugandan champions Vipers SC on a three-year contract, becoming their second signing of that summer.

In September 2023, Orit moved to Arua Hill SC on a free transfer, but later joined BUL FC on 19 January 2024 signing a two year contract which expired in July 2026.

== International career ==
Orit made his debut for Uganda on 22 January 2021 in a 2–1 defeat to Togo in the 2020 African Nations Championship. He scored his first goal for Uganda in their following match with a shot from 16 yards in a 5–2 defeat against Morocco on 26 January.He has 14 caps on the Cranes and two goals.

== Style of play ==
Orit plays as a winger. Upon signing for the club, Vipers SC manager Fred Kajoba stated that he played as a "wide forward often cutting in from the left but has at times played on the right and off the main striker".

== Career statistics ==
=== International ===
As of match played 22 January 2023

Appearances and goals by national team and year
National team	Year	Apps	Goals
Uganda	2021	11	2
Uganda	2022	1	0
Uganda	2023	2	0
Total		14	2

Scores and results list Uganda's goal tally first, score column indicates score after each Orit goal.

List of international goals scored by Ibrahim Orit
No.	Date	Venue	Opponent	Score	Result	Competition
1	26 January 2021	Reunification Stadium, Douala, Cameroon	Morocco	1–0	2–5	2020 African Nations Championship
2	10 June 2021	Orlando Stadium, Johannesburg, South Africa	South Africa	1–0	2–3	Friendly

== Honors ==
Vipers SC

- 2 startimes Uganda premier league title: 2020/21, 2021/22
- 2 Stambic Uganda Cup titles

BUL FC

- FUFA Super 8: 2024

== See Also ==
- Milton Karisa
- Yunus Sentamu
