= Milton Karisa =

Ugandan footballer (born 1995)

Personal information
- Date of birth: 27 July 1995 (age 31)
- Place of birth: Jinja, Jinja District, Uganda
- Height: 1.76 m (5 ft 9 in)
- Position: Winger

Team information
- Current team: Vipers
- Number: 29

Youth career
- 2011–2013: JMC

Senior career*
Years	Team	Apps	(Gls)
2013–2016	BUL	27	(13)
2016–2018	Vipers	42	(17)
2018–2019	MC Oujda	22	(4)
2020–	Vipers	3	(1)

International career^{‡}
2017–	Uganda	51	(6)
- * Club domestic league appearances and goals as of 13:48, 26 December 2019 (UTC) ‡ National team caps and goals as of 26 July 2026

Milton Karisa (born 27 July 1995) is a Ugandan professional footballer who plays as a right winger for Uganda Premier League club Vipers and the Uganda national team.

== Club career ==
=== BUL FC ===
In 2013, Milton joined Bul FC from Jinja Municipal Football Club. He made his debut for the club against Kansai Plascon FC (formerly known as Sadolin Paints FC) in 2013, where he scored his first goal against Kiira Young FC at Namboole Stadium.

=== Vipers SC ===
Milton joined Vipers S.C. in January 2017. He made his team debut against Lweza FC at Namboole Stadium in a game that ended 2–0 in favour of Vipers where Milton made an assist. Milton scored his first goal for Vipers on 10 March 2017 against Platinum Stars at St. Mary`s Stadium in a CAF Confederation Cup qualifier. It was a historic goal on the day Vipers opened their new stadium, St Mary’s in Kitende.

=== MC Oujda ===
Milton joined MC Oujda in September 2018 on a two-year contract. On 22 September 2018, he made his team debut against Kawkab AC Marrakech at the Marrakesh Stadium, with Milton scoring in the match.

=== Return to Vipers SC ===
In January 2020, Milton returned to Vipers. On 25 February, he scored a goal and assisted another in Vipers' 5–0 home win against Maroons FC.

== International career ==
Milton made his debut for the Uganda national team against Kenya in a 1–1 friendly draw at Machakos Stadium on 23 March 2017.

== Career statistics ==
=== International ===
As of match played 29 December 2024

Appearances and goals by national team and year
National team	Year	Apps	Goals
Uganda	2017	15	2
Uganda	2018	7	0
Uganda	2019	2	0
Uganda	2020	–	
Uganda	2021	6	0
Uganda	2022	10	3
Uganda	2023	9	1
Uganda	2024	2	0
Total		51	6

Scores and results list Uganda's goal tally first, score column indicates score after each Karisa goal.

List of international goals scored by Milton Karisa
No.	Date	Venue	Opponent	Score	Result	Competition
1	12 November 2017	Stade Alphonse Massemba-Débat, Brazzaville, Congo	Congo	1–1	1–1	2018 FIFA World Cup qualification
2	7 December 2017	Bukhungu Stadium, Kakamega, Kenya	South Sudan	1–0	5–1	2017 CECAFA Cup
3	18 January 2022	Titanic Sports Center - Field 1, Belek, Turkey	Moldova	3–2	3–2	Friendly
4	27 January 2022	Bahrain National Stadium, Riffa, Bahrain	Bahrain	1–0	1–3	Friendly
5	8 June 2022	St. Mary's Stadium-Kitende, Entebbe, Uganda	Niger	1–0	1–1	2023 Africa Cup of Nations qualification
6	18 January 2023	19 May 1956 Stadium, Annaba, Algeria	Senegal	1–0	1–0	2022 African Nations Championship

== Honours ==
=== Club ===
Vipers SC

- Uganda Cup runner-up:

2018

- Uganda Premier League (2):

2017–18, 2019–20
