= Alioune Badara Faty =

Senegalese footballer (born 1999)

Personal information
- Full name: Alioune Badara Faty
- Date of birth: 3 May 1999 (age 27)
- Place of birth: Ziguinchor, Senegal
- Position: Goalkeeper

Team information
- Current team: TP Mazembe
- Number: 33

Senior career*
Years	Team	Apps	(Gls)
2019–2022	Casa Sports		
2023–	TP Mazembe	53	(7)
Medal record
Men's football
Representing Senegal
Africa Cup of Nations
2021 Cameroon
- * Club domestic league appearances and goals

Alioune Badara Faty (born 3 May 1999) is a Senegalese professional footballer who plays as a goalkeeper for TP Mazembe and the Senegal national team.

He was part of Senegal's squad for the 2021 Africa Cup of Nations; the Lions of Teranga went on to win the tournament for the first time in their history.

He was appointed a Grand Officer of the National Order of the Lion by President of Senegal Macky Sall following the nation's victory at the tournament.

== Honours ==
Casa Sport

- Senegal Championship :2022
- Senegal Cup : 2021, 2022

TP Mazembe

- Linafoot : 2024

Senegal

- Africa Cup of Nations: 2021

Individual

- Grand Officer of the National Order of the Lion: 2022
