= Cheikh Touradou Diouf =

Senegalese sprinter

Personal information
- Nationality: Senegalese
- Born: 4 May 1956 (age 70)

Sport
- Sport: Sprinting
- Event: 200 metres
Medal record
Men's athletics
Representing Senegal
African Championships
Silver medal – second place	1979 Dakar	4×100 m

Cheikh Touradou Diouf (born 4 May 1956) is a Senegalese sprinter. He competed in the men's 200 metres at the 1980 Summer Olympics.
