= Jamal Salim =

Ugandan footballer (born 1995)

Personal information
- Full name: Omar Jamal Salim Magoola
- Date of birth: 27 May 1995 (age 31)
- Place of birth: Pallisa, Uganda
- Height: 1.87 m (6 ft 2 in)
- Position: Goalkeeper

Team information
- Current team: Richards Bay F.C.
- Number: 80

Senior career*
Years	Team	Apps	(Gls)
2011–2012	Express	31	(0)
2012–2014	KCCA	55	(0)
2014–2018	Al-Merrikh	120	(0)
2018–2021	Al-Hilal Club	60	(0)
2021–2022	Pretoria Callies	18	(0)
2022–	Richards Bay	82	(0)

International career^{‡}
2012–	Uganda	8	(0)
- * Club domestic league appearances and goals as of 4 January 2026 ‡ National team caps and goals as of 4 May 2023

Omar Jamal Salim Magoola (born 27 May 1995), commonly known as Jamal Salim, is a Ugandan professional footballer who plays as a goalkeeper for Richards Bay and the Uganda national team.

== Career ==
Salim has played club football in Uganda for Express FC and the Kampala Capital City Authority FC.

He was signed by Express FC after the Inter regions tournament in 2011, which was won by his team Central. In 2012, he was attending Kampala University as a first year student undertaking a degree in human resource management and was one of the nominees for Bell Super League goalkeeper of the year. He made his international debut for Uganda on 10 July 2012 against South Sudan. He was a member of the Ugandan Cranes Team for two African Cap of Nations (AFCON) Finals in 2017 in Gabon and 2019 in Egypt.

== Career statistics ==
=== International ===
As of matches played on 15 August 2019

Uganda national team
Year	Apps	Goals
2012	1	0
2013	0	0
2014	1	0
2015	0	0
2016	2	0
2017	1	0
2018	1	0
2019	0	0
Total	6	0
