= Kenneth Semakula =

Ugandan footballer

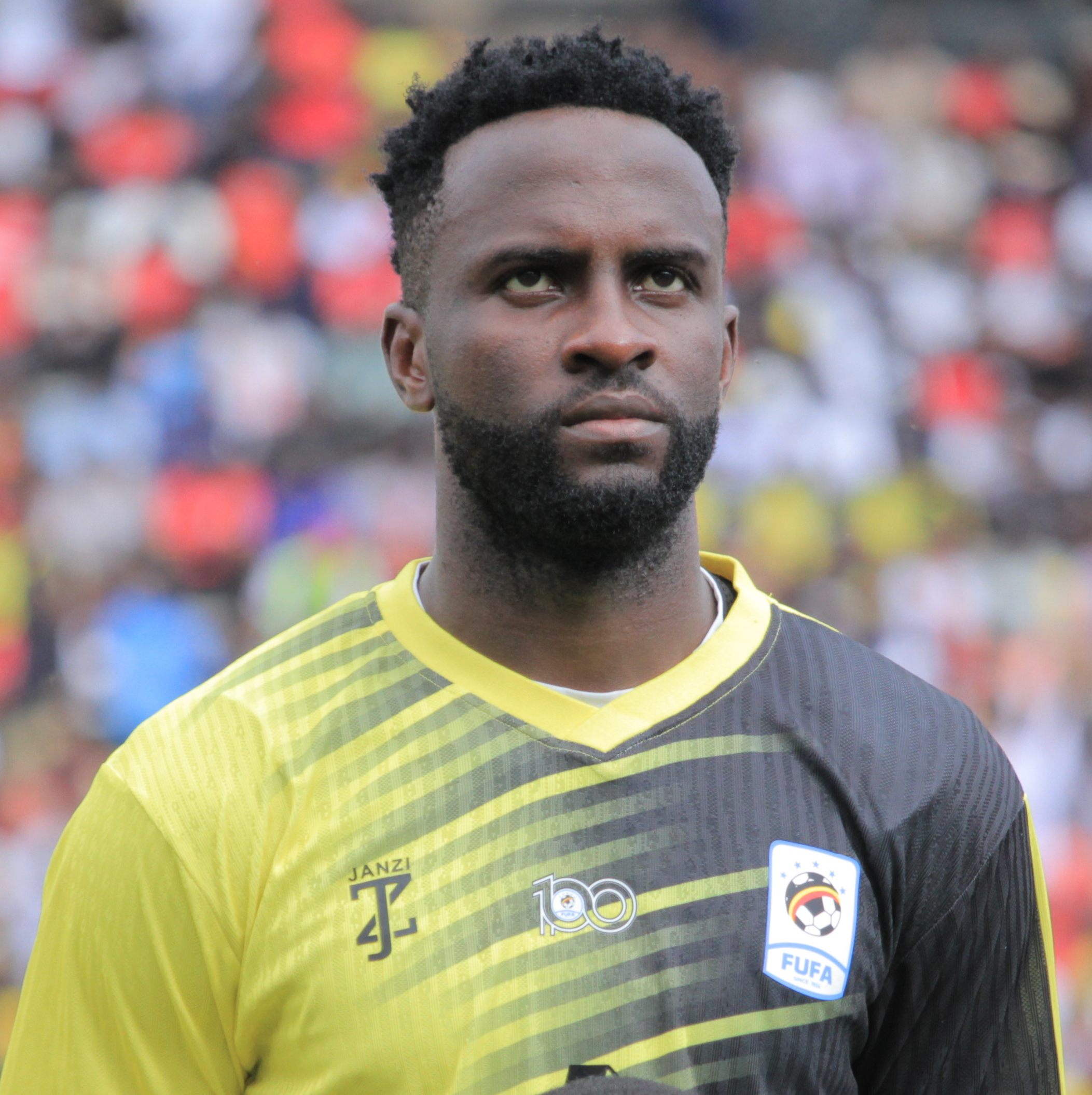

Personal information
- Full name: Kenneth Semakula
- Date of birth: 4 November 2002 (age 23)
- Place of birth: Tororo, Uganda
- Height: 1.80 m (5 ft 11 in)
- Position: Defensive midfielder

Team information
- Current team: Al Ittihad Alexandria
- Number: 24

Youth career
- Kirinya Jinja SSS

Senior career*
Years	Team	Apps	(Gls)
2019–2020	Busoga United	7	(0)
2020–2021	BUL Jinja	10	(0)
2021–2024	SC Villa	70	(1)
2024–2025	Club Africain	19	(0)
2025	Al-Arabi	0	(0)
2025	Al-Adalah	11	(0)
2026-	Al Ittihad Alexandria	0	(0)

International career^{‡}
2021–	Uganda	23	(0)
- * Club domestic league appearances and goals as of 09:16, 15 August 2026 (UTC) ‡ National team caps and goals as of 01:34, 16 March 2025 (UTC)

Kenneth Semakula (born 4 November 2002) is a Ugandan professional footballer who plays as a defensive midfielder for Egyptian Premier League Al Ittihad Alexandria and the Uganda national team.

Semakula made his national team debut in 2019, playing for the Hippos - Uganda national under-20 football team at the 2019 CECAFA U-20 Championship held in Uganda. Later that year he was called up for the senior team - Uganda Cranes where he has since made 23 appearances since 2021.

== Early life and education ==
Kenneth was born in Tororo. He attended Rock View Primary School Tororo, World Secondary School Matugga, St. John's Collage Kawuga Mukono, Light College Katikamu and Jinja Secondary School for his education.

== Playing career ==
Semakula began his football career at the age of 7 with True Vine Soccer Academy in Tororo. He later joined the City Tyres under-14 team, where he was voted Most Valuable Player (MVP) in the Eastern Region. Semakula later won the best player award at the under-17 Airtel Rising Stars national tournament.

== Club career ==
Semakula's professional career began at Busoga United FC before he joined BUL Jinja FC. In July 2024, he joined Club Africain, on a two-year contract.

After 1 match with Al-Arabi in the AFC Challenge League he was released. On 16 September 2025, Semakula joined Saudi FDL club Al-Adalah. In July, 2026, he joined his current club, Al-Ittihad Alexandaria.
