= Moutarou Baldé =

Senegalese footballer

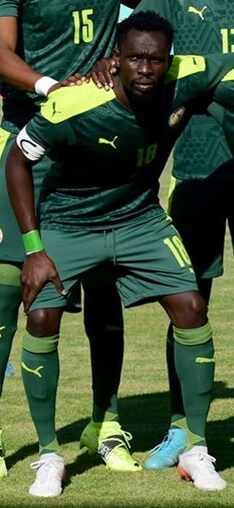

Personal information
- Full name: El Hadji Moutarou Baldé
- Date of birth: 5 October 1993 (age 33)
- Place of birth: Moudéry, Senegal
- Height: 1.75 m (5 ft 9 in)
- Position: Right-back

Team information
- Current team: Teungueth

Senior career*
Years	Team	Apps	(Gls)
2009–2010	ASEC Ndiambour		
2010–2014	Port Autonome		
2014–2017	AS Douanes		
2017–	Teungueth		

International career^{‡}
2019–	Senegal	5	(0)
- * Club domestic league appearances and goals as of 22:37, 1 September 2021 (UTC) ‡ National team caps and goals as of 22:37, 1 September 2021 (UTC)

El Hadji Moutarou Baldé (born 5 October 1993) is a Senegalese footballer who plays as a right-back for Teungueth and the Senegal national team.

== International career ==
Baldé made his debut with the Senegal national team in a 1–0 2020 African Nations Championship qualification loss to Liberia on 28 July 2019. He was named to the team of the tournament at the 2019 WAFU Cup of Nations.
