= 2022–23 Senegal Ligue 1 =

Ligue 1
- Season: 2022–23
- Champions: Génération Foot
- Relegated: AS Douanes; CNEPS Excellence
- Champions League: Génération Foot
- Confederation Cup: Casa Sports
- Matches: 182
- Goals: 309 (1.7 per match)

The 2022—23 Ligue 1 was a season of top-flight football in Senegal.

Génération Foot won their third title with three matches to go after defeating Diambars FC 1–0. The club won 10 games in a row en route to the title.

ASCE La Linguère avoided relegation by defeating the champions 2–0 in the final match day of the season. AS Douanes were relegated to Ligue 2 after losing to second-placed Casa Sports, along with CNEPS Excellence, whose relegation was confirmed earlier in the season.

== League Changes ==
ASC SONACOS were promoted from the 2021–22 Ligue 2 as champions. Stade de Mbour were also promoted as runners-up after spending only one season out of the top flight.

== League Table ==
Pos	Team	Pld	W	D	L	GF	GA	GD	Pts	Qualification or relegation
1	Génération Foot (C)	26	16	5	5	33	15	+18	53	Champions, Qualification to the 2023–24 CAF Champions League
2	Casa Sports	26	12	7	7	32	23	+9	43	Qualification to the 2023–24 CAF Confederation Cup
3	Guédiawaye FC	26	11	9	6	28	19	+9	42	
4	Diambars	26	13	3	10	33	25	+8	42	
5	ASC Jaraaf	26	10	7	9	18	15	+3	37	
6	Teungueth	26	10	6	10	24	23	+1	36	
7	Sonacos	26	8	11	7	20	18	+2	35	
8	US Gorée	26	7	12	7	19	20	−1	33	
9	Dakar Sacré-Cœur	26	7	11	8	16	18	−2	32	
10	AS Pikine	26	7	10	9	16	20	−4	31	
11	La Linguère	26	7	9	10	24	23	+1	30	
12	Stade de Mbour	26	4	17	5	15	19	−4	29	
13	AS Douanes (R)	26	6	10	10	12	24	−12	28	Relegation
14	CNEPS Excellence (R)	26	1	9	16	19	47	−28	12	Relegation

Source: Soccerway
Rules for classification: 1) points; 2) goal difference; 3) number of goals scored.
(C) Champions; (R) Relegated

== Attendances ==
#	Football club	Average attendance
1	ASC Jaraaf	2,850
2	AS Pikine	2,623
3	Guédiawaye FC	1,648
4	SONACOS	1,535
5	Casa Sports	1,252
6	AS Dakar Sacré-Cœur	1,208
7	Teungueth FC	1,104
8	CNEPS Excellence	847
9	Stade de Mbour	813
10	AS Douanes	591
11	Génération Foot	493
12	ASCE La Linguère	328
13	Diambars FC	309
14	US Gorée	207
