= Nelson Senkatuka =

Ugandan footballer (born 1997)

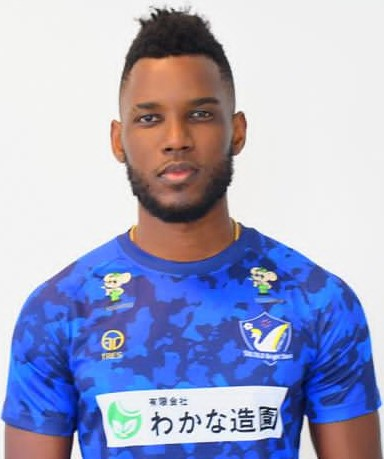
- Senkatuka during unveiling

Personal information
- Date of birth: 10 September 1997 (age 29)
- Place of birth: Kampala, Uganda
- Height: 1.79 m (5 ft 10 in)
- Position: Striker

Team information
- Current team: Bright Stars FC
- Number: 11

Youth career
- 2012–2013: Hope Doves Kampala
- 2014: Erith and Belvedere F.C.
- 2014–2015: Cranes United F.C.

Senior career*
Years	Team	Apps	(Gls)
2015–2016	Kampala City Council	16	(4)
2016–2017	Proline FC	25	(11)
2017–2019	Bright Stars FC	60	(34)
2019–2021	Moghreb Tétouan	9	(1)
2021–	Bright Stars FC	1	(1)

International career^{‡}
2015–	Uganda	11	(1)
- * Club domestic league appearances and goals as of 17 October 2021 ‡ National team caps and goals as of 17 October 2021

Nelson Senkatuka (born 10 September 1997) is a Ugandan professional footballer who plays as a striker for Bright Stars FC and the Uganda national team.

Senkatuka began his career at Hope Doves FC in Kampala where he spent two seasons and played for Erith and Belvedere F.C., Cranes United FC, Kampala City Council, Proline Football Club and currently in Bright Stars FC.

== Club career ==
=== Hope Doves F.C. ===
While in Hope Doves he guided back to back promotions from the Kampala Regional League top scoring with 23 goals in 24 games and 27 goals in 31 games.

=== Erith & Belvedere ===
While studying in the United Kingdom, Senkatuka played for Erith & Belvedere F.C. in the Ryman Football League and played five matches and scored one goal.

=== Cranes United F.C. ===
Senkatuka also featured for Cranes United F.C in the Essex Alliance Football League where he played 34 matches and scored 45 goals.

=== Kampala City Council ===
While at Kampala City Council Senkatuka played 16 games and scored 4 goals.

=== Proline Football Club ===
He was unveiled at Proline Football Club on Saturday 12 August 2016. He was among the top-five goal scorers in the Uganda Super League 2016/2017 scoring 11 goals and making 7 assists.

=== Bright Stars Football Club ===
==== 2017–18 Uganda Premier League ====
On his 20th birthday Senkatuka joined Bright Stars F.C. and made his debut on 12 September 2017 against Vipers SC at Mwererwe stadium and the match ended 0-0 where he played the entire game. His first goal for Bright Stars Football Club was against Soana FC in the 60th minute on 15 September 2017 at Kavumba. He serves as a captain for Bright Stars Football Club as well. He not only captained the side throughout the season, but was also their best player and top scorer after scoring 15 goals, finishing second in the league in goals scored. He missed the climax of the season when he prepared to travel to Japan and Belgium for trial stints.

==== 2018–19 Uganda Premier League ====
On 28 September 2018 the opening day of the Uganda Premier League 2018-2019 Senkatuka scored a brace against Maroons FC, Bright Stars won 3-1. On 11 April 2019 Senkatuka scored his 10th goal of the season against URA at Mandela National Stadium. In the last match day fixture of the Uganda Premier League Senkatuka completed the season with 16 goals, five of which came in one game against Paidha Black Angels at the apex of the season on 4 May 2019 at Champions Stadium. In that season Senkatuka played a total of 30 matches in Uganda Premier League scoring 16 goals thus finishing second on the Uganda Premier League top scorers chart that season, Bright Stars finished in the 8th position in the 2018/2019 Uganda Premier League.

=== Moghreb Tétouan ===
On 13 September 2019 Nelson joined Moghreb Tétouan on a three-year contract.

=== Bright Stars Football Club ===
On 22 September 2021, he re-signed for Bright Stars Football Club and scored his first goal on the opening day of the 2021-2022 Uganda Premier League it was against Mbarara City FC. On 5 December 2021 against UPDF SC, Senkatuka completed a tally of 50 goals in the Uganda Premier League.

== International career ==
Senkatuka made his Uganda Cranes International debut in the 2015 CECAFA Cup that was hosted in Ethiopia. He was a squad member of Uganda Cranes in the CECAFA Cup 2015 in Ethiopia. He was part of the Uganda team that played a friendly match against Ethiopia on 3 June 2017 in Addis Abbaba that ended 0-0. Senkatuka came on as a 2nd half substitute to replace Farouk Miya.

Uganda
Year	Apps	Goals
2015	2	0
2017	5	0
2018	3	1
2019	1	0
Total	11	1

Statistics accurate as of match played 17 October 2021

== Personal life ==
Senkatuka is a Muganda by tribe falling under the Mbogo clan.

== Honours ==
Kampala City Council

- Ugandan Super League: 2016

Uganda

- CECAFA Cup: 2015

Individual

- Topscorer Kampala 1st Division 2012-13 with 24 goals in 24 games.
- Topscorer Kampala Regional League 2013-14 with 27 goals in 32 games.
- Topscorer UK African Nations Cup 2014 with 13 goals in 7 games.
- Topscorer Essex Alliance League 2014-15 with 45 goals in 37 games.
- MVP Biika bya Baganda 2015

=== Bright Stars Football Club ===
- Man of the Match: Bright Stars Football Club vs. Express Football Club
