= Génération Foot =

Association football club in Senegal

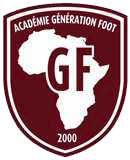
- Full name: Académie Génération Foot Amara Touré
- Founded: 2000; 26 years ago
- Ground: Stade Lat-Dior
- Capacity: 8,712
- Chairman: Mady Touré
- Manager: Boubacar Gadiaga
- League: Senegal Premier League
- 2025–26: 3rd
- Website: https://asgenerationfoot.com/
Home colours	Away colours

Académie Génération Foot, also called Association Sportive Génération Foot is an association football club founded in 2000 in Dakar, Senegal. The Stade Lat-Dior, which has a capacity of 8,712, is their home stadium.

== History ==
Académie Génération Foot Amara Touré was founded in 2000 in Dakar by Mady Touré. The club took the name of Amara Touré, the father of Mady.

In 2003, they entered into a partnership with Metz.

In 2017, they won their first Senegalese Championship, with Ibrahima Niane the top scorer for the season, scoring a record number of 19 goals.

In 2025, 17 year old Amara Diouf was named among the best teenage wonderkids in football, in the annual Goal NXGN 50 best teenage wonderkids article.

== Crest ==
Former logo

== Squad ==
As of 30 December 2022

Note: Flags indicate national team as defined under FIFA eligibility rules; some limited exceptions apply. Players may hold more than one non-FIFA nationality.

No.	Pos.	Nation	Player
2	DF	SEN	Thibaut Aubertin
6	MF	SEN	Ousmane Sow
14	DF	SEN	Mor Talla Mbaye
16	GK	SEN	Pape Sy
17	MF	SEN	Jean Diouf
21	GK	SEN	Cherif Gueye
25	DF	SEN	Cheikhou Ndiaye (captain)
28	FW	SEN	Malick Mbaye

No.	Pos.	Nation	Player
37	FW	SEN	Akhibou Ly
61	GK	SEN	Khalifa Ababacar Sarry
—	GK	MLI	Mohamed Niare
—	DF	MLI	Ismaila Simpara
—	MF	MTN	Samba Diop
—	FW	SEN	Ousmane Cissé
—	FW	SEN	Pape Badji

== Honours ==
=== League ===
- Ligue 1 (Tier 1)
  - Champions: 2016–17, 2018–19, 2022–23
  - Runners-up: 2017–18
- Ligue 2 (Tier 2)
  - Runners-up: 2015–16
- National 1 (Tier 3)
  - Champions: 2010, 2014–15

=== Cup ===
- Senegal FA Cup
  - Winners: 2014–15, 2017–18, 2024–25
- Senegalese Trophée des Champions
  - Winners: 2017
  - Runners-up: 2023
- Senegalese Super Cup
  - Winners: 2017, 2018
- Senegalese Coupe de la Ligue
  - Runners-up: 2018–19

== Performance in CAF competitions ==
- CAF Champions League
  - 2018 – First Round
  - 2019–20 – First Round
  - 2023–24 – First Round
- CAF Confederation Cup
  - 2016 – Preliminary Round
  - 2018 – Play-off Round
  - 2018–19 – First Round
  - 2019–20 – Play-off Round
  - 2025–26 – First Round

== Notable alumni ==
More than 30 athletes who have trained at the Académie Génération Foot have gone on to become professional footballers. Among them, notable players include:

- (Senegal) Moustapha Bayal Sall
- (Cameroon) Landry Nguémo
- (Senegal) Amara Diouf
- (Senegal) Momar N'Diaye
- (Senegal) Cheikh Gueye
- (Senegal) Babacar Gueye
- (Senegal) Papiss Cissé
- (Senegal) Fallou Diagne
- (Senegal) Diafra Sakho
- (Senegal) Sadio Mané
- (Senegal) Ismaïla Sarr
- (Senegal) Ibrahima Niane
- (Senegal) Pape Matar Sarr
