= Paul Put =

Belgian football manager (born 1956)

Personal information
- Date of birth: 26 May 1956 (age 70)
- Place of birth: Merksem, Belgium

Team information
- Current team: Uganda (manager)

Managerial career
- Years: Team
- Geel
- 2001–2003: Lokeren
- 2004–2005: Lierse
- 2006: Mouscron
- 2008–2011: Gambia
- 2012–2015: Burkina Faso
- 2015–2016: Jordan
- 2016–2017: USM Alger
- 2017–2018: Kenya
- 2018: Xinjiang Tianshan Leopard
- 2018–2019: Guinea
- 2020–2021: Saif SC
- 2021–2023: Congo
- 2023–: Uganda
Medal record
Men's football
Representing Burkina Faso (as manager)
Africa Cup of Nations
Runner-up	2013

Paul Put (born 26 May 1956) is a Belgian football coach who manages the Uganda national team.

== Career ==
Put was manager of the Gambian national team between 2008 and 2011, before being appointed as manager of Burkina Faso in March 2012. He had previously managed Belgian club sides Geel, Lokeren and Lierse, before being banned for three-years by the Royal Belgian Football Association for his alleged involvement in the Ye Zheyun match-fixing scandal.

Put left his role as Burkina Faso manager in February 2015, before becoming manager of Jordan in June 2015. Following a two-week suspension by the Jordan Football Association on 20 December 2015, Put resigned his position as manager of the Jordan national team in January 2016. He was shortlisted for the Guinea national team job in July 2016.

On 30 October 2016, he was announced as manager of Algerian club USM Alger, on a two-year contract. In February 2017 he was one of a number of managers on the shortlist for the vacant Rwanda national team manager role. He became the manager of the Kenyan national team in November 2017, before resigning in February 2018.

He became manager of Chinese club Xinjiang Tianshan Leopard later that month, signing a three-year contract. In March 2018 he was appointed manager of the Guinea national team. He was sacked in July 2019, and received a lifetime ban by the Guinea Football Federation in August 2019.

On 1 October 2019, Put was appointed sporting director of Wydad Casablanca.

In October 2020, he was appointed by Bangladeshi top flight club Saif SC as their new head coach. He resigned in February 2021.

He became manager of Congo in May 2021. He became manager of Uganda in 2023.
