= 2020 African Nations Championship squads =

The 2020 African Nations Championship was an international football tournament held in Cameroon from 16 January to 7 February 2021. The 16 national teams involved in the tournament were required to register a squad of up to 33 players, including at least three goalkeepers, an increase over the usual number of 23 players allowed. Only players in these squads were eligible to take part in the tournament. Unlike the Africa Cup of Nations, this tournament exclusively requires players to be registered to a club within their country to be eligible. Expatriate players, even if they play in Africa, cannot participate in the event.

Due to the COVID-19 pandemic in Africa, the Confederation of African Football (CAF) allowed the 16 teams involved to register a list of up to 33 players (23-man normal squad and up to 10 extra players) in order that teams have available players in case players from their list of 23 with positive tests for SARS-CoV-2 are detected and require to be replaced during the tournament. However, the inclusion of the 10 extra players was optional and not mandatory. Each national team had to submit its list of 23 players and up to 10 optional extra players to CAF Secretary General until 6 January 2021 deadline, 10 days before the start of the tournament.

The age listed for each player is on 16 January 2021, the first day of the tournament. A flag is included for coaches who are of a different nationality than their own national team. Players in cursive were registered as reserves.

== Group A ==
=== Cameroon ===
Manager: Martin Ndtoungou

The 23-man squad and 10 reserves were announced on 11 January 2021. Forward Christian Mayo was ruled out due to injury and replaced by Hans Moussima.

No.	Pos.	Player	Date of birth (age)	Caps	Goals	Club
1	GK	Junior Dande	22 February 1998 (aged 22)	0	0	(Cameroonian Football Federation) APEJES Academy
2	DF	Richard Ebanda	2 January 1996 (aged 25)	0	0	(Cameroonian Football Federation) Colombe du Dja
3	DF	Mbouri Basile Yamkam	2 February 1998 (aged 22)	0	0	(Cameroonian Football Federation) PWD Bamenda
4	DF	Pierre Etame	24 March 1994 (aged 26)	0	0	(Cameroonian Football Federation) Coton Sport
5	DF	Karl Ndedi	25 December 1999 (aged 21)	0	0	(Cameroonian Football Federation) Donlap Academy
6	MF	Fabrice Onama Baduidana	5 October 1994 (aged 26)	0	0	(Cameroonian Football Federation) Stade Renard
7	FW	Dangmo Man-Ykre	29 September 1997 (aged 23)	0	0	(Cameroonian Football Federation) Colombe du Dja
8	MF	Félix Oukiné	28 December 1998 (aged 22)	0	0	(Cameroonian Football Federation) Coton Sport
9	FW	Wilfred Mbougain	10 June 2000 (aged 20)	0	0	(Cameroonian Football Federation) UMS de Loum
10	FW	Jacques Zoua (captain)	6 September 1991 (aged 29)	28	0	(Cameroonian Football Federation) AS Futuro
11	DF	Serge Andoulo	8 January 1995 (aged 26)	1	0	(Cameroonian Football Federation) Union Douala
12	MF	Anthony Kevin Mfede	28 July 1994 (aged 26)	3	0	(Cameroonian Football Federation) AS Futuro
13	MF	Thierry Tchuenté	27 March 1992 (aged 28)	0	0	(Cameroonian Football Federation) Coton Sport
14	DF	Salomon Bindjeme II	19 January 1996 (aged 24)	0	0	(Cameroonian Football Federation) Coton Sport
15	FW	Yannick N'Djeng	11 March 1990 (aged 30)	5	0	(Cameroonian Football Federation) AS Futuro
16	GK	Haschou Kerrido	2 June 1994 (aged 26)	0	0	(Cameroonian Football Federation) PWD Bamenda
17	FW	Franck Ondoa	3 November 2004 (aged 16)	0	0	(Cameroonian Football Federation) Acinfoot de Nyom
18	MF	Martin Loïc Ako Assomo	21 December 1999 (aged 21)	0	0	(Cameroonian Football Federation) APEJES Academy
19	FW	Bryand Soga	9 June 1999 (aged 21)	0	0	(Cameroonian Football Federation) APEJES Academy
20	MF	Valentin Beo Batto	10 October 1996 (aged 24)	0	0	(Cameroonian Football Federation) Astres
21	DF	Steve Keuni	4 September 1996 (aged 24)	0	0	(Cameroonian Football Federation) Stade Renard
22	GK	Narcisse Nlend	10 September 1991 (aged 29)	0	0	(Cameroonian Football Federation) Coton Sport
23	GK	Epane Epane Letizi	13 August 1992 (aged 28)	0	0	(Cameroonian Football Federation) Stade Renard
24	DF	Joel Ondoua Boung	27 July 1996 (aged 24)	0	0	(Cameroonian Football Federation) PWD Bamenda
25	DF	Rostand Moukap	18 May 1993 (aged 27)	1	0	(Cameroonian Football Federation) Bamboutos
26	DF	Gabriel Fils	28 May 2002 (aged 18)	0	0	(Cameroonian Football Federation) APEJES Academy
27	MF	Joel Ngong	30 July 1996 (aged 24)	0	0	(Cameroonian Football Federation) Canon Yaoundé
28	MF	Alfred Meyong	23 February 1991 (aged 29)	0	0	(Cameroonian Football Federation) Stade Renard
29	MF	Marc Dynam Atangana	25 May 1997 (aged 23)	0	0	(Cameroonian Football Federation) Fauve Azur
30	MF	Emmanuel Kofana	7 August 1992 (aged 28)	1	0	(Cameroonian Football Federation) Canon Yaoundé
31	FW	Hans Moussima		0	0	(Cameroonian Football Federation) Fauve Azur
32	DF	Hassana Mamoudou	25 October 1999 (aged 21)	0	0	(Cameroonian Football Federation) Coton Sport
33	MF	Bertrand Mani	21 May 2001 (aged 19)	0	0	(Cameroonian Football Federation) Colombe du Dja

=== Mali ===
Manager: Nouhoum Diané

The 33-man squad was announced on 8 January 2021.

No.	Pos.	Player	Date of birth (age)	Caps	Goals	Club
1	GK	Cheick Sy	9 November 1992 (aged 28)	0	0	(Malian Football Federation) Onze Créateurs
2	DF	Yacouba Doumbia	11 April 1992 (aged 28)	0	0	(Malian Football Federation) Stade Malien
3	DF	Siaka Bagayoko	24 July 1998 (aged 22)	2	0	(Malian Football Federation) Djoliba AC
4	DF	Mohamed Camara	27 October 1987 (aged 33)	5	1	(Malian Football Federation) AS Real Bamako
5	DF	Issaka Samaké	20 October 1994 (aged 26)	12	1	(Malian Football Federation) Stade Malien
6	MF	Makan Samabaly	11 June 1995 (aged 25)	4	0	(Malian Football Federation) AS Real Bamako
7	FW	Mamaye Coulibaly	13 December 1999 (aged 21)	2	0	(Malian Football Federation) Stade Malien
8	MF	Sadio Kanouté	21 October 1996 (aged 24)	1	0	(Malian Football Federation) Stade Malien
9	FW	Mamadou Coulibaly	27 July 1985 (aged 35)	9	1	(Malian Football Federation) Stade Malien
10	FW	Moussa Koné	19 December 1990 (aged 30)	6	4	(Malian Football Federation) AS Real Bamako
11	MF	Ibourahima Sidibé	27 December 1992 (aged 28)	8	2	(Malian Football Federation) AS Real Bamako
12	DF	Moussa Ballo	11 January 1996 (aged 25)	1	0	(Malian Football Federation) AS Real Bamako
13	DF	Barou Sanogo	18 April 1995 (aged 25)	0	0	(Malian Football Federation) Djoliba AC
14	MF	Mamadou Traoré	8 February 1999 (aged 21)	0	0	(Malian Football Federation) Stade Malien
15	DF	Mamadou Doumbia	28 February 1995 (aged 25)	11	0	(Malian Football Federation) Stade Malien
16	GK	Djigui Diarra (captain)	27 February 1995 (aged 25)	40	0	(Malian Football Federation) Stade Malien
17	MF	Aly Desse Sissoko	5 May 1995 (aged 25)	2	1	(Malian Football Federation) Stade Malien
18	MF	Moussa Kyabou	18 April 1998 (aged 22)	3	0	(Malian Football Federation) USC Kita
19	FW	Bassekou Diabaté	15 April 2000 (aged 20)	0	0	(Malian Football Federation) Yeelen Olympique
20	MF	Sekou Konaté	17 January 1998 (aged 22)	0	0	(Malian Football Federation) Stade Malien
21	FW	Demba Diallo	13 October 2000 (aged 20)	0	0	(Malian Football Federation) Stade Malien
22	DF	Drissa Diarra	1 May 1999 (aged 21)	1	0	(Malian Football Federation) AS Bamako
23	GK	Aboubacar Doumbia	21 November 1995 (aged 25)	0	0	(Malian Football Federation) Djoliba AC
24	FW	Saiba Dabo	26 March 2002 (aged 18)	0	0	(Malian Football Federation) Guidars FC
25	DF	Sekou Diarra	27 July 1993 (aged 27)	10	0	(Malian Football Federation) Onze Créateurs
26	MF	Oumar Camara	18 August 1992 (aged 28)	0	0	(Malian Football Federation) Djoliba AC
27	GK	Kalilou Traoré	2 February 1989 (aged 31)	0	0	(Malian Football Federation) Yeelen Olympique
28	DF	Samou Sidibé	15 May 1995 (aged 25)	1	0	(Malian Football Federation) Stade Malien
29	MF	Mohamed Haidara	31 December 1998 (aged 22)	0	0	(Malian Football Federation) AS Bakaridjan
30	MF	Ibrahim Dembélé	17 February 1999 (aged 21)	0	0	(Malian Football Federation) Lafia Club de Bamako
31	FW	Zoumana Simpara	22 February 1998 (aged 22)	0	0	(Malian Football Federation) AS Bakaridjan
32	FW	Ousmane Kamissoko	28 August 1998 (aged 22)	0	0	(Malian Football Federation) Guidars FC
33	FW	Abdoulaye Kanu	7 October 2000 (aged 20)	0	0	(Malian Football Federation) FC Diarra

=== Burkina Faso ===
Manager: Seydou Zerbo

The 33-man squad was announced on 3 January 2021.

No.	Pos.	Player	Date of birth (age)	Caps	Goals	Club
1	GK	Aboubacar Sawadogo (captain)	10 August 1989 (aged 31)	14	0	(Burkinabé Football Federation) RCK
2	MF	Abdala Sana	31 December 1994 (aged 26)	0	0	(Burkinabé Football Federation) AS Douanes
3	DF	Amadou Zon	21 June 1998 (aged 22)	0	0	(Burkinabé Football Federation) KOZAF
4	DF	Soumaïla Ouattara	4 July 1995 (aged 25)	1	0	(Burkinabé Football Federation) Rahimo
5	MF	Sékou Sidibé	28 December 1995 (aged 25)	0	0	(Burkinabé Football Federation) ASFB
6	DF	Moustapha Ouédraogo	31 December 2001 (aged 19)	0	0	(Burkinabé Football Federation) ASFA Yennenga
7	MF	Abdoul Karim Baguian	25 August 1995 (aged 25)	1	0	(Burkinabé Football Federation) Majestic
8	MF	Sami Hien	1 January 1997 (aged 24)	0	0	(Burkinabé Football Federation) Salitas
9	FW	Yannick Pognongo	17 December 1990 (aged 30)	2	1	(Burkinabé Football Federation) EFO
10	MF	Clément Pitroipa	23 November 1998 (aged 22)	0	0	(Burkinabé Football Federation) USFA
11	DF	Issouf Sosso	1 November 1994 (aged 26)	1	0	(Burkinabé Football Federation) ASFA Yennenga
12	FW	Issiaka Ouédraogo	19 August 1988 (aged 32)	0	0	(Burkinabé Football Federation) AS SONABEL
13	FW	Aziz Kadéba	31 December 1991 (aged 29)	0	0	(Burkinabé Football Federation) Vitesse FC
14	DF	Abdoulaye Zongo	28 December 1992 (aged 28)	0	0	(Burkinabé Football Federation) EFO
15	MF	Claver Tiendrebeogo	14 February 1996 (aged 24)	0	0	(Burkinabé Football Federation) AS SONABEL
16	GK	Ibrahim Saré	31 December 2000 (aged 20)	0	0	(Burkinabé Football Federation) ASFA Yennenga
17	DF	Hermann Nikiéma	30 November 1988 (aged 32)	2	1	(Burkinabé Football Federation) Salitas
18	MF	Ismahila Ouédraogo	5 November 1999 (aged 21)	2	0	(Burkinabé Football Federation) AS Douanes
19	FW	Ilias Tiendrébéogo	31 December 1992 (aged 28)	7	0	(Burkinabé Football Federation) US Ouagadougou
20	FW	Assami Sansan Dah	8 January 1994 (aged 27)	0	0	(Burkinabé Football Federation) AS Douanes
21	DF	Moumouni Compaoré	31 December 1992 (aged 28)	3	0	(Burkinabé Football Federation) USFA
22	MF	Kalifa Nikiéma	31 December 2000 (aged 20)	0	0	(Burkinabé Football Federation) Salitas
23	GK	Farid Ouédraogo	26 December 1996 (aged 24)	0	0	(Burkinabé Football Federation) USFA
24	DF	René Zoungrana	18 December 1996 (aged 24)	1	0	(Burkinabé Football Federation) USFA
25	MF	Aboubacar Traoré	10 December 1992 (aged 28)	8	0	(Burkinabé Football Federation) Salitas
26	MF	Ibrahim Touré	22 November 1999 (aged 21)	0	0	(Burkinabé Football Federation) EFO
27	DF	Ibrahim Koné	31 December 1997 (aged 23)	0	0	(Burkinabé Football Federation) AS SONABEL
28	FW	Hamed Belem	24 September 1999 (aged 21)	0	0	(Burkinabé Football Federation) Rahimo
29	FW	Mohamed Lamine Ouattara	14 June 1998 (aged 22)	0	0	(Burkinabé Football Federation) AS SONABEL
30	GK	Ben Idriss Traoré	11 August 1996 (aged 24)	0	0	(Burkinabé Football Federation) AS SONABEL
31	MF	Roland Sanou	10 May 2002 (aged 18)	0	0	(Burkinabé Football Federation) Royal FC
32	MF	Ferdinand Ouédraogo	30 May 1994 (aged 26)	0	0	(Burkinabé Football Federation) RCK
33	MF	Ousmane Diané	14 February 2001 (aged 19)	0	0	(Burkinabé Football Federation) ASFA Yennenga

=== Zimbabwe ===
Manager: (Croatia) Zdravko Logarušić

The 23-man squad and 10 reserves were announced on 4 January 2021. The ten reserves players registered were: defenders Frank Makarati, Tymon Mvula and Munyaradzi Diro-Nyenye; midfielders Devon Chafa, Jeansmith Mutudza, Phineas Bamusi, Ishmael Wadi, Nqobizitha Masuku, Tichaona Chipunza and the forward Thomas Chideu. On 13 January 2021, the reserve Thomas Chideu replaced forward Tawanda Nyamandwe who tested positive for COVID-19. Zimbabwe's squad consisted of only 23 players, the reserve players did not travel to Cameroon.

No.	Pos.	Player	Date of birth (age)	Caps	Goals	Club
1	GK	Ariel Sibanda	25 January 1989 (aged 31)	4	0	(Zimbabwe Football Association) Highlanders
2	DF	Ian Nekati	7 August 1989 (aged 31)	8	0	(Zimbabwe Football Association) Chicken Inn
3	DF	Qadr Amin	26 January 1990 (aged 30)	9	1	(Zimbabwe Football Association) Ngezi Platinum
4	MF	Richard Hachiro	27 January 1998 (aged 22)	5	0	(Zimbabwe Football Association) CAPS United
5	MF	Shadreck Nyahwa	5 January 1999 (aged 22)	0	0	(Zimbabwe Football Association) Bulawayo Chiefs
6	FW	Thomas Chideu	30 October 1996 (aged 24)	1	0	(Zimbabwe Football Association) Harare City
7	MF	King Nadolo	5 December 1995 (aged 25)	2	0	(Zimbabwe Football Association) Dynamos
8	DF	Carlos Mavhurume	2 April 1996 (aged 24)	0	0	(Zimbabwe Football Association) CAPS United
9	DF	Tafadzwa Jaravani	29 October 1993 (aged 27)	0	0	(Zimbabwe Football Association) CAPS United
10	MF	Denver Mukamba	21 December 1992 (aged 28)	16	1	(Zimbabwe Football Association) Ngezi Platinum
11	MF	Tatenda Tavengwa	29 March 1997 (aged 23)	0	0	(Zimbabwe Football Association) Harare City
12	MF	Leeroy Mavunga	6 December 1998 (aged 22)	8	3	(Zimbabwe Football Association) CAPS United
13	FW	Obriel Chirinda	28 January 1997 (aged 23)	0	0	(Zimbabwe Football Association) Chicken Inn
14	DF	Pawell Govere	3 August 1994 (aged 26)	0	0	(Zimbabwe Football Association) Golden Eagles
15	DF	Partson Jaure (captain)	8 July 1990 (aged 30)	31	1	(Zimbabwe Football Association) Dynamos
16	GK	Nelson Chadya	5 April 1997 (aged 23)	0	0	(Zimbabwe Football Association) Ngezi Platinum
17	MF	Wellington Taderera	27 April 1995 (aged 25)	3	1	(Zimbabwe Football Association) Ngezi Platinum
18	DF	Andrew Mbeba	19 February 2000 (aged 20)	0	0	(Zimbabwe Football Association) Highlanders
19	DF	Talent Chamboko	19 October 1990 (aged 30)	0	0	(Zimbabwe Football Association) Manica Diamonds
20	MF	Ronald Chitiyo	10 June 1992 (aged 28)	21	2	(Zimbabwe Football Association) CAPS United
21	DF	Peter Muduwa	11 August 1993 (aged 27)	9	0	(Zimbabwe Football Association) Highlanders
22	FW	Farau Matare	8 December 1995 (aged 25)	0	0	(Zimbabwe Football Association) Bulawayo Chiefs
23	GK	Simbarashe Chinani	16 September 1995 (aged 25)	2	0	(Zimbabwe Football Association) Dynamos

== Group B ==
=== Libya ===
Manager: (Montenegro) Zoran Filipović

No.	Pos.	Player	Date of birth (age)	Club
1	GK	Fathi Al-Tahli	20 December 1988 (aged 32)	(Libyan Football Federation) Al-Nasr
12	GK	Abdulhakim El-Treki	25 September 1990 (aged 30)	(Libyan Football Federation) Al-Madina
22	GK	Ahmed Azzaqa	9 August 1988 (aged 32)	(Libyan Football Federation) Al-Madina
26	GK	Muad Allafi	15 May 2000 (aged 20)	(Libyan Football Federation) Al-Ittihad
2	DF	Rabea Al Laafi (Captain)	24 July 1991 (aged 29)	(Libyan Football Federation) Al-Nasr
3	DF	Hamed El-Thalba	16 January 1995 (aged 26)	(Libyan Football Federation) Al-Ahly Benghazi
4	DF	Alaa Elqjdar	2 November 1999 (aged 21)	(Libyan Football Federation) Abu Salem
5	DF	Salah Fakroun	8 February 1999 (aged 21)	(Libyan Football Federation) Al-Nasr
16	DF	Mansour Makkari	19 October 1992 (aged 28)	(Libyan Football Federation) Al-Ahly Benghazi
19	DF	Ahmed Huwaydi	26 February 1994 (aged 26)	(Libyan Football Federation) Al-Ahly Benghazi
29	DF	Abdalla Sherif	18 July 1996 (aged 24)	(Libyan Football Federation) Al-Nasr
6	MF	Mohammed Al-Tohami	31 May 1992 (aged 28)	(Libyan Football Federation) Al-Madina
18	MF	Ali Mohammed	23 November 2000 (aged 20)	(Libyan Football Federation) Al-Ittihad
20	MF	Muad Al-Amami	7 July 1998 (aged 22)	(Libyan Football Federation) Al-Hilal
21	MF	Rabia Al-Shadi	6 March 1994 (aged 26)	(Libyan Football Federation) Al-Ittihad
28	MF	El-Mehdi Al-Masry	19 June 1992 (aged 28)	(Libyan Football Federation) Al-Ittihad
31	MF	Abdullah Belaem	22 January 1997 (aged 23)	(Libyan Football Federation) Al-Ahli Tripoli
7	FW	Moataz Al-Mehdi	9 August 1990 (aged 30)	(Libyan Football Federation) Al-Ahli Tripoli
10	FW	Zakaria Alharaish	23 October 1998 (aged 22)	(Libyan Football Federation) Al-Ahli Tripoli
11	FW	Muad Eisa	8 May 1999 (aged 21)	(Libyan Football Federation) Al-Ittihad
17	FW	Ibrahim Bodbous	3 August 1996 (aged 24)	(Libyan Football Federation) Al-Ahly Benghazi
24	FW	Mohamed Makari	9 April 1996 (aged 24)	(Libyan Football Federation) Al-Ahli Tripoli
27	FW	Anis Al-Musrati	19 October 1994 (aged 26)	(Libyan Football Federation) Al-Hilal

=== DR Congo ===
Manager: Florent Ibengé

The 33-man squad was announced on 6 January 2021. On 7 January 2021, defender Arsène Zola and midfielder Mokonzi Gbazeke were replaced by Doxa Gikanji and Kadima Kabangu respectively due to administrative reasons.

No.	Pos.	Player	Date of birth (age)	Caps	Goals	Club
1	GK	Ley Matampi (captain)	18 April 1989 (aged 31)	40	0	(Congolese Association Football Federation) FC Lupopo
2	DF	Issama Mpeko	30 April 1989 (aged 31)	75	1	(Congolese Association Football Federation) TP Mazembe
3	DF	Isaka Chadrack Boka	20 November 1999 (aged 21)	0	0	(Congolese Association Football Federation) SM Sanga Balende
4	MF	Doxa Gikanji	21 August 1990 (aged 30)	13	1	(Congolese Association Football Federation) DC Motema Pembe
5	DF	Idumba Fasika	28 February 1999 (aged 21)	0	0	(Congolese Association Football Federation) FC Lupopo
6	DF	Andy Bikoko Lobulka	28 December 1999 (aged 21)	0	0	(Congolese Association Football Federation) SM Sanga Balende
7	MF	Phillippes Kinzumbi	26 January 1999 (aged 21)	0	0	(Congolese Association Football Federation) TP Mazembe
8	MF	Merveille Kikasa Wamba	14 February 1999 (aged 21)	3	1	(Congolese Association Football Federation) AS Vita
9	FW	Joël Beya	8 December 1999 (aged 21)	4	4	(Congolese Association Football Federation) TP Mazembe
10	MF	Merceil Ngimbi	18 April 1997 (aged 23)	0	0	(Congolese Association Football Federation) AS Maniema Union
11	MF	Ricky Tulengi	2 February 1993 (aged 27)	9	0	(Congolese Association Football Federation) AS Vita
12	DF	Ernest Luzolo Sita	27 February 1997 (aged 23)	3	0	(Congolese Association Football Federation) AS Vita
13	MF	Gedeon Ingoli Iyoso	21 January 1998 (aged 22)	0	0	(Congolese Association Football Federation) Blessing FC
14	DF	Amedé Masasi Obenza	11 September 1991 (aged 29)	0	0	(Congolese Association Football Federation) AS Vita
15	FW	Makabi Lilepo	27 July 1997 (aged 23)	0	0	(Congolese Association Football Federation) AS Vita
16	GK	Baggio Siadi	21 July 1997 (aged 23)	1	0	(Congolese Association Football Federation) JS Groupe Bazano
17	FW	Jean Baleke Othos	17 April 2001 (aged 19)	0	0	(Congolese Association Football Federation) Jeunesse Sportive de Kinshasa
18	MF	Jérémie Mumbere	10 June 1991 (aged 29)	2	0	(Congolese Association Football Federation) AS Vita
19	FW	Fiston Mayele	24 June 1994 (aged 26)	0	0	(Congolese Association Football Federation) AS Vita
20	DF	Atibu Radjabu	18 June 1997 (aged 23)	0	0	(Congolese Association Football Federation) AS Maniema Union
21	DF	Djuma Shabani	16 March 1993 (aged 27)	2	0	(Congolese Association Football Federation) AS Vita
22	MF	Likwela Yelemaya	10 February 1993 (aged 27)	0	0	(Congolese Association Football Federation) AS Maniema Union
23	GK	Nathan Mabruki Kuyumun	21 April 1996 (aged 24)	0	0	(Congolese Association Football Federation) FC MK Etanchéité
24	MF	Ciel Ebengo Ikoko	28 March 2001 (aged 19)	0	0	(Congolese Association Football Federation) FC Lupopo
25	FW	Kadima Kabangu	15 June 1993 (aged 27)	1	0	(Congolese Association Football Federation) DC Motema Pembe
26	FW	Karim Kimvuidi	13 March 2002 (aged 18)	0	0	(Congolese Association Football Federation) DC Motema Pembe
27	MF	Miché Mika	16 September 1996 (aged 24)	6	0	(Congolese Association Football Federation) TP Mazembe
28	DF	Michael Wango Mbabu	8 August 1994 (aged 26)	0	0	(Congolese Association Football Federation) AS Vita
29	DF	Inonga Baka	1 November 1999 (aged 21)	0	0	(Congolese Association Football Federation) DC Motema Pembe
30	FW	Chico Ushindi	7 January 1996 (aged 25)	2	0	(Congolese Association Football Federation) TP Mazembe
31	FW	William Likuta Luezi	23 August 1997 (aged 23)	0	0	(Congolese Association Football Federation) DC Motema Pembe
32	GK	Guy-Serge Mukumi	3 June 1991 (aged 29)	0	0	(Congolese Association Football Federation) Renaissance du Congo
33	FW	Jérémie Basilua	22 April 1993 (aged 27)	1	1	(Congolese Association Football Federation) SM Sanga Balende

=== Congo ===
Manager: Barthélémy Ngatsono

The 30-man squad was announced by CAF on 16 January 2021. Congo's squad that traveled to Cameroon consisted of 25 players and was announced on 31 December 2020. Reserve forward Judea Mouandzibi was called up to join the 25-man squad on 23 January 2021.

No.	Pos.	Player	Date of birth (age)	Caps	Goals	Club
1	GK	Giscard Mavoungou	30 November 1999 (aged 21)	0	0	(Congolese Football Federation) AS Cheminots
2	DF	Prince Mouandza	23 October 2001 (aged 19)	0	0	(Congolese Football Federation) AS Otohô
3	DF	Cervelie Epoyo	20 October 1985 (aged 35)	0	0	(Congolese Football Federation) Étoile du Congo
4	DF	Julfin Ondongo	28 March 1997 (aged 23)	3	0	(Congolese Football Federation) Étoile du Congo
5	DF	Landry Bakima	10 April 1992 (aged 28)	0	0	(Congolese Football Federation) AS Otohô
6	DF	Dimitri Bissiki	17 March 1991 (aged 29)	43	0	(Congolese Football Federation) AS Otohô
7	FW	Aimé Maleka	14 June 1999 (aged 21)	0	0	(Congolese Football Federation) Vita Club Mokanda
8	MF	Hardy Binguila	17 July 1996 (aged 24)	18	5	(Congolese Football Federation) Diables Noirs
9	FW	Bersyl Obassi	29 March 1996 (aged 24)	7	0	(Congolese Football Federation) AS Otohô
10	FW	Bercy Langa Lesse	26 April 2000 (aged 20)	0	0	(Congolese Football Federation) AS Otohô
11	MF	Prince Obongo	21 February 1997 (aged 23)	2	0	(Congolese Football Federation) Diables Noirs
12	FW	Yann Mokombo	4 September 1994 (aged 26)	5	1	(Congolese Football Federation) AS Otohô
13	FW	Jaures Ngombe	22 May 1998 (aged 22)	8	1	(Congolese Football Federation) AS Otohô
14	DF	Faria Ondongo	19 June 1996 (aged 24)	1	0	(Congolese Football Federation) AS Otohô
15	DF	Varel Joviale Rozan	9 September 1994 (aged 26)	8	0	(Congolese Football Federation) AS Otohô
16	MF	Chandrel Massanga	17 August 1999 (aged 21)	2	0	(Congolese Football Federation) AS Otohô
17	GK	Pavelh Ndzila (captain)	12 January 1995 (aged 26)	7	0	(Congolese Football Federation) Étoile du Congo
18	MF	Mick Ossété	18 August 1999 (aged 21)	7	0	(Congolese Football Federation) Diables Noirs
19	MF	Junior Ngoma Ndzaou	26 October 1997 (aged 23)	0	0	(Congolese Football Federation) AS Otohô
20	FW	Gautrand Ngouenimba	28 February 1997 (aged 23)	1	0	(Congolese Football Federation) Étoile du Congo
21	MF	Sagesse Babélé	13 February 1993 (aged 27)	17	0	(Congolese Football Federation) Patronage Sainte-Anne
22	MF	Hilda Brel Mohendiki	7 September 1997 (aged 23)	2	0	(Congolese Football Federation) AS Otohô
23	GK	Chansel Massa	24 January 1987 (aged 33)	20	0	(Congolese Football Federation) Étoile du Congo
24	DF	Hernest Briyock Malonga	3 October 2002 (aged 18)	0	0	(Congolese Football Federation) Tongo FC
25	FW	Archange Bintsouka	25 October 2002 (aged 18)	0	0	(Congolese Football Federation) AS Kondzo
26	MF	Mignon Etou-Mban	16 July 1999 (aged 21)	2	1	(Congolese Football Federation) Étoile du Congo
27	MF	Arddy Santous	23 June 2002 (aged 18)	0	0	(Congolese Football Federation) AS Cheminots
28	DF	Grâce Batekouahou	4 June 1998 (aged 22)	0	0	(Congolese Football Federation) Diables Noirs
29	FW	Judea Mouandzibi	31 January 1997 (aged 23)	0	0	(Congolese Football Federation) Inter Club Brazzaville
30	GK	Chill Ngakosso	26 July 1994 (aged 26)	0	0	(Congolese Football Federation) CARA Brazzaville

=== Niger ===
Manager: Harouna Doula Gabde

The 33-man squad was announced by CAF on 16 January 2021. Niger's squad in Cameroon consisted of 29 players and was announced on 16 January 2021.

No.	Pos.	Player	Date of birth (age)	Caps	Goals	Club
1	GK	Abdoul Razak Halidou	4 April 1992 (aged 28)	0	0	(Nigerien Football Federation) AS Douanes
2	DF	Mouhamadou Hamidou Ali	7 May 1989 (aged 31)	2	0	(Nigerien Football Federation) AS SONIDEP
3	DF	Ismael Souley	18 July 2000 (aged 20)	0	0	(Nigerien Football Federation) AS Police
4	DF	Soufiane Boubacar	10 March 1995 (aged 25)	0	0	(Nigerien Football Federation) AS GNN
5	DF	Abdoul Nasser Garba	23 December 1991 (aged 29)	14	0	(Nigerien Football Federation) AS Douanes
6	MF	Souleymane Lawali	3 October 1996 (aged 24)	1	0	(Nigerien Football Federation) AS SONIDEP
7	FW	Ibrahim Boubacar Marou	1 January 2000 (aged 21)	0	0	(Nigerien Football Federation) AS FAN
8	MF	Abdoul Moumouni	7 August 2002 (aged 18)	1	0	(Nigerien Football Federation) US GN
9	FW	Adamou Moussa	1 January 1995 (aged 26)	4	1	(Nigerien Football Federation) AS FAN
10	MF	Mossi Issa Moussa	24 January 1993 (aged 27)	12	1	(Nigerien Football Federation) AS Douanes
11	FW	Issa Djibrilla	1 January 1996 (aged 25)	4	2	(Nigerien Football Federation) Sahel SC
12	MF	Ousseini Badamassi	21 April 1997 (aged 23)	0	0	(Nigerien Football Federation) AS GNN
13	DF	Razak Seyni	1 January 1990 (aged 31)	12	1	(Nigerien Football Federation) US GN
14	DF	Abdoul Karim Mamoudou	1 January 1995 (aged 26)	4	0	(Nigerien Football Federation) AS GNN
15	MF	Ousseini Koudize	26 December 1991 (aged 29)	0	0	(Nigerien Football Federation) AS Douanes
16	GK	Yahaya Babari	22 September 1993 (aged 27)	2	0	(Nigerien Football Federation) AS GNN
17	MF	Boubacar Hima	8 December 1987 (aged 33)	0	0	(Nigerien Football Federation) AS GNN
18	DF	Ibrahim Adamou Djibo	13 August 1998 (aged 22)	0	0	(Nigerien Football Federation) ASN Nigelec
19	FW	Djibrill Goumey	14 July 2000 (aged 20)	1	0	(Nigerien Football Federation) ASN Nigelec
20	FW	Idrissa Halidou (captain)	3 July 1982 (aged 38)	13	3	(Nigerien Football Federation) AS GNN
21	FW	Abdoul Aziz Ibrahim	15 March 1996 (aged 24)	4	1	(Nigerien Football Federation) AS Douanes
22	GK	Oumarou Issaka	2 December 1990 (aged 30)	0	0	(Nigerien Football Federation) Sahel SC
23	DF	Harouna Amadou	25 August 1992 (aged 28)	2	0	(Nigerien Football Federation) ASN Nigelec
24	DF	Anani Adodo	11 February 1994 (aged 26)	0	0	(Nigerien Football Federation) AS Douanes
25	MF	Mamouda Idi		0	0	(Nigerien Football Federation) AS GNN
26	MF	Abdoul Aziz Sani	10 November 1998 (aged 22)	0	0	(Nigerien Football Federation) Sahel SC
27	FW	Aboubacar Yacouba	1 January 2000 (aged 21)	0	0	(Nigerien Football Federation) AS FAN
28	FW	Amadou Boubacar	12 December 1992 (aged 28)	0	0	(Nigerien Football Federation) AS SONIDEP
29	MF	Ismael Mahamadou	1 January 2002 (aged 19)	0	0	(Nigerien Football Federation) US GN
30	GK	Moussa Alzouma	30 September 1982 (aged 38)	8	0	(Nigerien Football Federation) AS GNN
31	FW	Abdoul Kader Amadou	11 July 1991 (aged 29)	0	0	(Nigerien Football Federation) AS Douanes
32	FW	Abdoul Malik	12 November 2001 (aged 19)	0	0	(Nigerien Football Federation) Racing FC
33	GK	Oumarou Soumaila Ayouba	24 October 1987 (aged 33)	0	0	(Nigerien Football Federation) US GN

== Group C ==
=== Morocco ===
Manager: Hussein Ammouta

The 33-man squad was announced on 14 January 2021.

No.	Pos.	Player	Date of birth (age)	Caps	Goals	Club
1	GK	Anas Zniti	28 August 1988 (aged 32)	11	0	(Royal Moroccan Football Federation) Raja Casablana
2	DF	El Mehdi Karnass	12 March 1990 (aged 30)	3	1	(Royal Moroccan Football Federation) Difaâ El Jadida
3	DF	Abdelkrim Baadi	14 April 1996 (aged 24)	3	0	(Royal Moroccan Football Federation) RS Berkane
4	DF	Ismael Mokadem	26 July 1995 (aged 25)	0	0	(Royal Moroccan Football Federation) RS Berkane
5	MF	Yahya Jabrane	18 June 1991 (aged 29)	3	0	(Royal Moroccan Football Federation) Wydad Casablanca
6	MF	Mohammed Ali Bemammer	19 November 1989 (aged 31)	3	0	(Royal Moroccan Football Federation) Ittihad Tanger
7	FW	Zakaria Hadraf	12 March 1990 (aged 30)	15	2	(Royal Moroccan Football Federation) RS Berkane
8	MF	Larbi Naji	14 December 1990 (aged 30)	2	0	(Royal Moroccan Football Federation) RS Berkane
9	FW	Ayoub El Kaabi	26 June 1993 (aged 27)	16	11	(Royal Moroccan Football Federation) Wydad Casablanca
10	MF	Walid El Karti	23 July 1994 (aged 26)	13	3	(Royal Moroccan Football Federation) Wydad Casablanca
11	MF	Reda Jaadi	14 February 1995 (aged 25)	0	0	(Royal Moroccan Football Federation) FUS de Rabat
12	GK	Mohamed Amsif	7 February 1989 (aged 31)	8	0	(Royal Moroccan Football Federation) FUS de Rabat
13	DF	Hamza El Moussaoui	7 April 1993 (aged 27)	0	0	(Royal Moroccan Football Federation) Moghreb Tétouan
14	FW	Achraf Dari	6 May 1999 (aged 21)	0	0	(Royal Moroccan Football Federation) Wydad Casablanca
15	DF	Soufiane Bouftini	3 August 1994 (aged 26)	2	0	(Royal Moroccan Football Federation) Hassania Agadir
16	MF	Zakaria Fati	6 September 1992 (aged 28)	0	0	(Royal Moroccan Football Federation) FAR Rabat
17	MF	Anas Bach	10 February 1998 (aged 22)	0	0	(Royal Moroccan Football Federation) FUS de Rabat
18	FW	Abdelilah Hafidi	30 January 1992 (aged 28)	17	3	(Royal Moroccan Football Federation) Raja Casablana
19	MF	Brahim El Bahraoui	30 July 1992 (aged 28)	0	0	(Royal Moroccan Football Federation) RS Berkane
20	MF	Si Mohammed El Fakih	7 February 1990 (aged 30)	0	0	(Royal Moroccan Football Federation) MAS Fez
21	FW	Soufiane Rahimi	2 June 1996 (aged 24)	0	0	(Royal Moroccan Football Federation) Raja Casablana
22	GK	Zouhair Laaroubi	30 July 1984 (aged 36)	1	0	(Royal Moroccan Football Federation) RS Berkane
23	DF	Omar Namsaoui	4 April 1990 (aged 30)	2	0	(Royal Moroccan Football Federation) RS Berkane
24	DF	Abdellah Khafifi	19 February 1993 (aged 27)	0	0	(Royal Moroccan Football Federation) Mouloudia Oujda
25	MF	Nawfel Zerhouni	14 September 1995 (aged 25)	0	0	(Royal Moroccan Football Federation) FUS de Rabat
26	FW	Adam Ennafati	29 June 1994 (aged 26)	1	0	(Royal Moroccan Football Federation) Mouloudia Oujda
27	DF	Abdelmounaim Boutouil	1 September 1998 (aged 22)	0	0	(Royal Moroccan Football Federation) SCC Mohammédia
28	FW	Reda Slim	25 October 1999 (aged 21)	0	0	(Royal Moroccan Football Federation) FAR Rabat
29	FW	Ismail Khafi	19 September 1995 (aged 25)	0	0	(Royal Moroccan Football Federation) Mouloudia Oujda
30	FW	Walid Sabbar	25 February 1996 (aged 24)	0	0	(Royal Moroccan Football Federation) OCS
31	MF	Noah Sadaoui	14 September 1993 (aged 27)	0	0	(Royal Moroccan Football Federation) Raja Casablanca
32	FW	Mohamed Al Makaazi	5 February 1995 (aged 25)	0	0	(Royal Moroccan Football Federation) Raja Casablanca
33	GK	Hicham El Majhad	9 April 1991 (aged 29)	0	0	(Royal Moroccan Football Federation) Ittihad Tanger

=== Rwanda ===
Manager: Vincent Mashami

The 30-man squad was announced on 8 January 2021.

No.	Pos.	Player	Date of birth (age)	Caps	Goals	Club
1	GK	Eric Ndayishimiye	26 May 1991 (aged 29)	0	0	(Rwanda Football Federation) AS Kigali
2	DF	Emmanuel Imanishimwe	2 February 1995 (aged 25)	21	0	(Rwanda Football Federation) APR
3	DF	Eric Rutanga	3 November 1992 (aged 28)	14	1	(Rwanda Football Federation) Police FC
4	DF	Hervé Rugwiro	21 December 1990 (aged 30)	4	0	(Rwanda Football Federation) Rayon Sports
5	DF	Ange Mutsinzi	15 November 1997 (aged 23)	2	0	(Rwanda Football Federation) APR
6	MF	Eric Nsabimana	11 October 1994 (aged 26)	4	1	(Rwanda Football Federation) AS Kigali
7	FW	Osée Iyabivuze	14 April 1995 (aged 25)	3	0	(Rwanda Football Federation) Police FC
8	DF	Emery Bayisenge	28 March 1994 (aged 26)	46	1	(Rwanda Football Federation) AS Kigali
9	FW	Jacques Tuyisenge (captain)	22 September 1991 (aged 29)	48	14	(Rwanda Football Federation) APR
10	FW	Muhadjiri Hakizimana	13 August 1994 (aged 26)	18	5	(Rwanda Football Federation) AS Kigali
11	MF	Rachid Kalisa	16 June 1996 (aged 24)	4	0	(Rwanda Football Federation) AS Kigali
12	FW	Justin Mico	21 December 1994 (aged 26)	10	0	(Rwanda Football Federation) Police FC
13	DF	Fitina Omborenga	20 May 1996 (aged 24)	43	1	(Rwanda Football Federation) APR
14	FW	Lague Byiringiro	25 October 2000 (aged 20)	0	0	(Rwanda Football Federation) APR
15	DF	Faustin Usengimana	6 November 1993 (aged 27)	31	0	(Rwanda Football Federation) Police FC
16	FW	Ernest Sugira	27 March 1991 (aged 29)	27	11	(Rwanda Football Federation) Rayon Sports
17	DF	Thierry Manzi	12 July 1996 (aged 24)	25	3	(Rwanda Football Federation) APR
18	GK	Yves Kimenyi	13 September 1992 (aged 28)	12	0	(Rwanda Football Federation) Kiyovu Sports
19	FW	Danny Usengimana	10 March 1996 (aged 24)	10	0	(Rwanda Football Federation) APR
20	MF	Djabel Manishimwe	10 May 1998 (aged 22)	11	0	(Rwanda Football Federation) APR
21	MF	Olivier Niyonzima	1 January 1993 (aged 28)	12	0	(Rwanda Football Federation) APR
22	DF	Aimable Nsabimana	6 June 1997 (aged 23)	6	0	(Rwanda Football Federation) Police FC
23	GK	Olivier Kwizera	30 July 1995 (aged 25)	13	0	(Rwanda Football Federation) Rayon Sports
24	DF	Claude Niyomugabo	20 August 1997 (aged 23)	0	0	(Rwanda Football Federation) APR
25	MF	Eric Ngendahimana	1 December 1989 (aged 31)	0	0	(Rwanda Football Federation) Kiyovu Sports
26	MF	Martin Fabrice Twizeyimana	3 May 1996 (aged 24)	0	0	(Rwanda Football Federation) Police FC
27	MF	Dominique Savio Nshuti	1 January 1997 (aged 24)	27	2	(Rwanda Football Federation) Police FC
28	FW	Bertrand Iradukunda	1 January 1995 (aged 26)	2	0	(Rwanda Football Federation) Gasogi United
29	MF	Jean Bosco Ruboneka	1 January 1999 (aged 22)	0	0	(Rwanda Football Federation) APR
30	GK	Umar Rwabugiri	28 September 1995 (aged 25)	0	0	(Rwanda Football Federation) APR

=== Uganda ===
Manager: (Northern Ireland) Johnathan McKinstry

The 25-man squad was announced on 7 January 2021.

No.	Pos.	Player	Date of birth (age)	Caps	Goals	Club
1	GK	Charles Lukwago	24 November 1994 (aged 26)	11	0	(Federation of Uganda Football Associations) KCCA
2	DF	Hassan Muhamud		0	0	(Federation of Uganda Football Associations) Police FC
3	DF	Aziz Abdu Kayondo	6 October 2002 (aged 18)	0	0	(Federation of Uganda Football Associations) Vipers
4	DF	Musitafa Mujuzi	5 May 1999 (aged 21)	5	0	(Federation of Uganda Football Associations) Kyetume
5	DF	Eric Ssenjobe	4 April 1999 (aged 21)	0	0	(Federation of Uganda Football Associations) Police FC
6	MF	Tony Mawejje	15 December 1986 (aged 34)	84	8	(Federation of Uganda Football Associations) Police FC
7	FW	Joackiam Ojera	25 December 1997 (aged 23)	6	1	(Federation of Uganda Football Associations) URA
8	MF	Shafiq Kagimu	28 May 1998 (aged 22)	13	0	(Federation of Uganda Football Associations) URA
9	FW	Brian Aheebwa	1 July 1998 (aged 22)	0	0	(Federation of Uganda Football Associations) KCCA
10	FW	Ben Ocen	20 June 1990 (aged 30)	0	0	(Federation of Uganda Football Associations) Police FC
11	FW	Vianney Ssekajugo	26 August 1996 (aged 24)	5	1	(Federation of Uganda Football Associations) Wakiso Giants
12	DF	Denis Iguma	10 October 1992 (aged 28)	61	1	(Federation of Uganda Football Associations) KCCA
13	FW	Ibrahim Orit	28 July 1998 (aged 22)	0	0	(Federation of Uganda Football Associations) Vipers
14	MF	Bright Anukani	26 June 2000 (aged 20)	9	3	(Federation of Uganda Football Associations) KCCA
15	DF	Paul Willa	30 November 1999 (aged 21)	12	0	(Federation of Uganda Football Associations) Vipers
16	MF	Saidi Kyeyune	30 November 1993 (aged 27)	18	1	(Federation of Uganda Football Associations) URA
17	FW	Muhammad Shaban	11 January 1998 (aged 23)	12	0	(Federation of Uganda Football Associations) Vipers
18	GK	Joel Mutakubwa	17 July 1994 (aged 26)	2	0	(Federation of Uganda Football Associations) Kyetume
19	GK	Alionzi Nafian Legason		0	0	(Federation of Uganda Football Associations) URA
20	GK	Tom Ikara	12 February 1997 (aged 23)	0	0	(Federation of Uganda Football Associations) Police FC
21	DF	Halid Lwaliwa (captain)	22 August 1996 (aged 24)	9	1	(Federation of Uganda Football Associations) Vipers
22	MF	Bobosi Byaruhanga	3 December 2001 (aged 19)	0	0	(Federation of Uganda Football Associations) Vipers
23	FW	Milton Karisa	27 July 1995 (aged 25)	23	2	(Federation of Uganda Football Associations) Vipers
24	DF	Paul Mbowa	24 January 1996 (aged 24)	2	0	(Federation of Uganda Football Associations) URA
25	MF	Abdu Karim Watambala	3 March 2000 (aged 20)	7	0	(Federation of Uganda Football Associations) Vipers

=== Togo ===
Manager: Jean-Paul Abalo

The 26-man squad was announced on 14 January 2021.

No.	Pos.	Player	Date of birth (age)	Caps	Goals	Club
1	GK	Kossi Agbéko Adry	16 November 1986 (aged 34)	0	0	(Togolese Football Federation) Dynamic Togolais
2	DF	Bilal Moussa	29 November 1996 (aged 24)	0	0	(Togolese Football Federation) AS Togo-Port
3	FW	Kossigan Christian Salifou	26 February 1996 (aged 24)	0	0	(Togolese Football Federation) Unisport
4	DF	Moubarack Issifou	15 December 1992 (aged 28)	0	0	(Togolese Football Federation) AS Douanes
5	DF	Abdoul-Sabourh Bode	22 January 1995 (aged 25)	4	0	(Togolese Football Federation) ASC Kara
6	DF	Messan Toudji	15 May 1997 (aged 23)	4	0	(Togolese Football Federation) Gomido
7	MF	Kossi Jean Ozou	12 April 1992 (aged 28)	4	0	(Togolese Football Federation) ASC Kara
8	MF	Marouf Tchakei	15 December 1995 (aged 25)	9	2	(Togolese Football Federation) ASKO Kara
9	FW	Abdou-Samiou Tchatakora	5 December 1996 (aged 24)	2	0	(Togolese Football Federation) ASC Kara
10	FW	Yendoutie Nane (captain)	23 June 1995 (aged 25)	4	2	(Togolese Football Federation) ASC Kara
11	FW	Ismaïl Ouro-Agoro	20 February 1996 (aged 24)	1	0	(Togolese Football Federation) ASC Kara
12	FW	Kossivi Moïse Adjahli	14 April 1996 (aged 24)	1	0	(Togolese Football Federation) Gomido
13	DF	Ayayi Zonor	7 April 1990 (aged 30)	0	0	(Togolese Football Federation) AS Douanes
14	DF	Abdoul-Halimou Sama	28 July 2002 (aged 18)	0	0	(Togolese Football Federation) ASKO Kara
15	FW	Kwadjo Akakpo	23 October 1989 (aged 31)	0	0	(Togolese Football Federation) AS Togo-Port
16	GK	Komla Hervé Gbenyo	24 September 1991 (aged 29)	0	0	(Togolese Football Federation) Gbohloé-su
17	FW	Ashraf Agoro	31 December 1997 (aged 23)	3	1	(Togolese Football Federation) ASC Kara
18	MF	Bilal Akoro	14 December 1999 (aged 21)	4	0	(Togolese Football Federation) AS Douanes
19	MF	Akaté Gnama	25 November 1991 (aged 29)	6	1	(Togolese Football Federation) ASKO Kara
20	MF	Kokouvi Dodzi Amekoudi	19 December 1993 (aged 27)	4	0	(Togolese Football Federation) Dynamic Togolais
21	MF	Kparo Jarry Ahoro	15 August 1999 (aged 21)	1	0	(Togolese Football Federation) Gbohloé-su
22	DF	Djalilou Madjedje	13 December 1991 (aged 29)	0	0	(Togolese Football Federation) AS Douanes
23	GK	Abdoul-Moubarack Aigba	5 August 1996 (aged 24)	4	0	(Togolese Football Federation) AS Douanes
24	DF	Idrissou Ridwane Souley	10 November 1992 (aged 28)	0	0	(Togolese Football Federation) Dynamic Togolais
25	FW	Koffi Gueli	31 December 1993 (aged 27)	1	0	(Togolese Football Federation) Gbohloé-su
26	DF	Kodjovi Djoyagbo	12 December 1998 (aged 22)	0	0	(Togolese Football Federation) AS Douanes

== Group D ==
=== Zambia ===
Manager: (Serbia) Milutin Sredojević

The 31-man squad was announced on 29 December 2020. Midfielder Felix Bulaya and forward Roger Kola were ruled out due to administrative reasons. On 7 January 2021, goalkeeper Allan Chibwe and defender Fackson Kapumbu were summoned to join the squad. Forward Jonathan Munalula was also registered in the squad. Eventually, on 15 January 2021, Zambia's squad was reduced to 28 players by the manager Milutin Sredojević, with defender Fackson Kapumbu, goalkeeper Richard Nyirenda and midfielder Chaniza Zulu being dropped.

No.	Pos.	Player	Date of birth (age)	Caps	Goals	Club
1	GK	Charles Kalumba	21 January 1996 (aged 24)	0	0	(Football Association of Zambia) Prison Leopards
2	DF	Kondwani Chiboni	14 September 1996 (aged 24)	5	0	(Football Association of Zambia) Power Dynamos
3	DF	Benedict Chepeshi	10 June 1996 (aged 24)	11	0	(Football Association of Zambia) Red Arrows
4	DF	Adrian Chama (captain)	18 March 1989 (aged 31)	36	0	(Football Association of Zambia) ZESCO United
5	DF	Luka Banda	6 April 1995 (aged 25)	8	0	(Football Association of Zambia) NAPSA Stars
6	MF	Benson Sakala	12 September 1996 (aged 24)	22	0	(Football Association of Zambia) Power Dynamos
7	MF	Kelvin Kampamba	24 November 1996 (aged 24)	17	3	(Football Association of Zambia) ZESCO United
8	MF	Leonard Mulenga	26 November 1997 (aged 23)	7	0	(Football Association of Zambia) Green Buffaloes
9	MF	Amity Shamende	4 August 1993 (aged 27)	6	1	(Football Association of Zambia) Green Eagles
10	MF	Bruce Musakanya	23 February 1994 (aged 26)	30	4	(Football Association of Zambia) ZESCO United
11	MF	Albert Kangwanda	7 April 1999 (aged 21)	2	2	(Football Association of Zambia) Zanaco
12	FW	Moses Phiri	3 June 1994 (aged 26)	15	1	(Football Association of Zambia) Zanaco
13	FW	Friday Samu	9 May 1995 (aged 25)	7	0	(Football Association of Zambia) Green Buffaloes
14	FW	Collins Sikombe	19 June 1997 (aged 23)	13	4	(Football Association of Zambia) Lusaka Dynamos
15	MF	Kelvin Kapumbu	6 April 1996 (aged 24)	10	0	(Football Association of Zambia) Zanaco
16	GK	Lameck Siame	9 July 1997 (aged 23)	1	0	(Football Association of Zambia) Kabwe Warriors
17	FW	Emmanuel Chabula	10 January 1998 (aged 23)	16	9	(Football Association of Zambia) Lusaka Dynamos
18	GK	Allan Chibwe	22 March 1991 (aged 29)	10	0	(Football Association of Zambia) Green Eagles
19	MF	Jackson Chirwa	11 June 1995 (aged 25)	28	1	(Football Association of Zambia) Green Buffaloes
20	MF	Spencer Sautu	10 March 1996 (aged 24)	16	2	(Football Association of Zambia) Power Dynamos
21	MF	Paul Katema	19 September 1997 (aged 23)	23	1	(Football Association of Zambia) Red Arrows
22	DF	Golden Mafwenta	15 January 2001 (aged 20)	0	0	(Football Association of Zambia) Buildcon
23	DF	Zacharia Chilongoshi	3 June 1999 (aged 21)	9	0	(Football Association of Zambia) Power Dynamos
25	DF	Dominic Chanda	26 February 1996 (aged 24)	3	0	(Football Association of Zambia) Kabwe Warriors
26	GK	Patrick Chooma	4 October 2001 (aged 19)	0	0	(Football Association of Zambia) KYSA
27	DF	Clement Mwape	28 February 1989 (aged 31)	8	0	(Football Association of Zambia) ZESCO United
28	DF	Pride Mwansa	12 December 1996 (aged 24)	0	0	(Football Association of Zambia) Nkwazi
32	MF	Harrison Chisala	4 August 1997 (aged 23)	0	0	(Football Association of Zambia) Nkana

=== Guinea ===
Manager: Lappé Bangoura

The 30-man squad was announced on 4 January 2021.

No.	Pos.	Player	Date of birth (age)	Caps	Goals	Club
1	GK	Nouhan Condé	22 July 1995 (aged 25)	1	0	(Guinean Football Federation) Ashanti de Siguiri
2	MF	Mohamed Coumbassa	15 March 1995 (aged 25)	0	0	(Guinean Football Federation) Santoba
3	DF	Mohamed Bangoura	14 March 1996 (aged 24)	2	0	(Guinean Football Federation) CI Kamsar
4	DF	Ibrahima Sory Doumbouya	25 March 1996 (aged 24)	2	0	(Guinean Football Federation) Wakriya
5	DF	Mohamed Khalil Traoré	9 July 2000 (aged 20)	0	0	(Guinean Football Federation) CI Kamsar
6	MF	Salia Bangoura	15 November 2001 (aged 19)	0	0	(Guinean Football Federation) Eléphant de Coléah
7	FW	Ibrahima Sory Camara	5 March 1993 (aged 27)	1	1	(Guinean Football Federation) Fello Star
8	MF	Karifala Keita	4 December 1994 (aged 26)	0	0	(Guinean Football Federation) Eléphant de Coléah
9	FW	Mamadouba Bangoura	20 March 2000 (aged 20)	2	1	(Guinean Football Federation) AS Kaloum
10	MF	Morlaye Sylla	27 July 1998 (aged 22)	2	0	(Guinean Football Federation) Horoya
11	FW	Ousmane Camara	9 July 1998 (aged 22)	1	0	(Guinean Football Federation) Hafia
12	FW	Sékou Oumar Yansané	19 February 1998 (aged 22)	0	0	(Guinean Football Federation) Wakriya
13	DF	Mohamed Camara	9 July 1999 (aged 21)	0	0	(Guinean Football Federation) Ashanti de Siguiri
14	MF	Jean Mousté	2 January 1994 (aged 27)	15	0	(Guinean Football Federation) Hafia
15	MF	Moussa Condé	27 July 1998 (aged 22)	0	0	(Guinean Football Federation) CI Kamsar
16	GK	Moussa Camara	27 November 1998 (aged 22)	7	0	(Guinean Football Federation) Horoya
17	DF	Abdoulaye Naby Camara	1 January 1994 (aged 27)	10	0	(Guinean Football Federation) CI Kamsar
18	MF	Mory Kanté	1 January 1997 (aged 24)	1	0	(Guinean Football Federation) AS Kaloum
19	FW	Yakhouba Gnagna Barry	17 April 1998 (aged 22)	0	0	(Guinean Football Federation) Horoya
20	MF	Alpha Oumar Sow	15 August 1997 (aged 23)	1	0	(Guinean Football Federation) Ashanti de Siguiri
21	FW	Victor Kantabadouno	1 January 2000 (aged 21)	1	0	(Guinean Football Federation) Wakriya
22	GK	Sékouba Camara	22 January 1997 (aged 23)	1	0	(Guinean Football Federation) AS Kaloum
23	DF	Naby Camara (captain)	10 May 1996 (aged 24)	2	0	(Guinean Football Federation) Hafia
24	MF	Mohamed Lamine Soumah	7 July 2002 (aged 18)	0	0	(Guinean Football Federation) AS Kaloum
25	DF	Ibrahima Aminata Condé	5 February 1998 (aged 22)	7	0	(Guinean Football Federation) Horoya
26	MF	Morlaye Camara	6 August 1999 (aged 21)	0	0	(Guinean Football Federation) Loubha
27	DF	Abou Mangué Camara	30 April 1996 (aged 24)	1	0	(Guinean Football Federation) Horoya
28	MF	Ismaël Camara	5 March 1998 (aged 22)	0	0	(Guinean Football Federation) Wakriya
29	FW	Boniface Haba	30 September 1996 (aged 24)	8	0	(Guinean Football Federation) Horoya
30	GK	Mohamed Camara	16 March 2000 (aged 20)	0	0	(Guinean Football Federation) Santoba

=== Namibia ===
Manager: Bobby Samaria

The 31-man squad was announced on 14 December 2020. Defender Larry Horaeb was replaced by Charles Hambira. Namibia's squad that traveled to Cameroon consisted of 28 players and was announced on 14 January 2021.

No.	Pos.	Player	Date of birth (age)	Caps	Goals	Club
1	GK	Kamaijanda Ndisiro	1 December 1999 (aged 21)	0	0	(Namibia Football Association) Black Africa
2	DF	Erasmus Ikeinge	8 February 1995 (aged 25)	0	0	(Namibia Football Association) Khomas Nampol
3	DF	Charles Hambira	3 June 1990 (aged 30)	12	2	(Namibia Football Association) Civics
4	DF	Aprocius Petrus	9 October 1999 (aged 21)	8	0	(Namibia Football Association) Eleven Arrows
5	DF	Pat-Nevin Uanivi	17 April 1987 (aged 33)	2	0	(Namibia Football Association) African Stars
6	MF	Alfeus Handura	1 August 1993 (aged 27)	4	0	(Namibia Football Association) African Stars
7	MF	Immanuel Heita	20 April 1992 (aged 28)	12	0	(Namibia Football Association) Black Africa
8	FW	Elmo Kambindu	26 May 1993 (aged 27)	9	4	(Namibia Football Association) Mighty Gunners
9	FW	Issaskar Gurirab	1 March 1998 (aged 22)	8	2	(Namibia Football Association) Life Fighters
10	MF	Ambrosius Amseb	26 May 1994 (aged 26)	3	0	(Namibia Football Association) Black Africa
11	MF	Absalom Iimbondi	11 October 1991 (aged 29)	36	4	(Namibia Football Association) Tigers
12	MF	Gustav Isaak	8 March 1989 (aged 31)	2	0	(Namibia Football Association) African Stars
13	DF	Emilio Martin	15 August 1990 (aged 30)	17	0	(Namibia Football Association) Black Africa
14	DF	Gregory Aukumeb	6 August 1991 (aged 29)	0	0	(Namibia Football Association) Blue Waters
15	MF	Marcell Papama	28 April 1996 (aged 24)	15	0	(Namibia Football Association) African Stars
16	GK	Ratanda Mbazuvara	15 August 1989 (aged 31)	4	0	(Namibia Football Association) African Stars
17	MF	Wendell Rudath	7 October 1995 (aged 25)	2	0	(Namibia Football Association) Black Africa
18	DF	Vitapi Ngaruka	16 October 1995 (aged 25)	15	1	(Namibia Football Association) Black Africa
19	MF	Llewelyn Stanley	15 June 1993 (aged 27)	6	0	(Namibia Football Association) African Stars
20	DF	Ivan Kamberipa	3 February 1994 (aged 26)	8	0	(Namibia Football Association) Black Africa
21	MF	Dynamo Fredericks (captain)	4 April 1992 (aged 28)	30	1	(Namibia Football Association) Black Africa
22	FW	Panduleni Nekundi	14 September 1988 (aged 32)	12	2	(Namibia Football Association) African Stars
23	GK	Edward Maova	5 September 1994 (aged 26)	6	0	(Namibia Football Association) Civics
24	FW	Deryl Goagoseb	12 April 1993 (aged 27)	0	0	(Namibia Football Association) Black Africa
25	MF	Wesley Katjiteo	17 February 1990 (aged 30)	3	0	(Namibia Football Association) Civics
26	DF	Kleopas Nuukushu	1 February 1990 (aged 30)	0	0	(Namibia Football Association) Tigers
27	DF	Johannes Mutanga	15 February 1993 (aged 27)	0	0	(Namibia Football Association) Eleven Arrows
28	FW	Monis Omseb	9 May 1992 (aged 28)	1	0	(Namibia Football Association) Tura Magic
29	MF	Brandon Neibeb	3 October 1997 (aged 23)	0	0	(Namibia Football Association) Citizens
30	GK	Immanuel Immanuel	2 December 1990 (aged 30)	0	0	(Namibia Football Association) Tigers
33	GK	Jonas Matheus	2 October 1996 (aged 24)	0	0	(Namibia Football Association) Citizens

=== Tanzania ===
Manager: (Burundi) Etienne Ndayiragije

The 28-man squad was announced on 14 January 2021.

No.	Pos.	Player	Date of birth (age)	Caps	Goals	Club
1	GK	Juma Kaseja	13 April 1985 (aged 35)	78	0	(Tanzania Football Federation) KMC
2	DF	Abdulrazack Hamza	23 March 2003 (aged 17)	0	0	(Tanzania Football Federation) Mbeya City
3	DF	Israel Mwenda	10 March 2000 (aged 20)	0	0	(Tanzania Football Federation) KMC
4	DF	Erasto Nyoni	7 May 1988 (aged 32)	100	6	(Tanzania Football Federation) Simba
5	DF	Bakari Nondo	5 November 1997 (aged 23)	12	0	(Tanzania Football Federation) Young Africans
6	MF	Feisal Salum	11 January 1998 (aged 23)	9	1	(Tanzania Football Federation) Young Africans
8	MF	Lucas Kikoti	15 February 2001 (aged 19)	1	0	(Tanzania Football Federation) Namungo
9	DF	Samwel Jackson	13 September 2002 (aged 18)	0	0	(Tanzania Football Federation) Ihefu
10	FW	Adam Omar Adam	4 May 1997 (aged 23)	1	0	(Tanzania Football Federation) JKT Tanzania
11	MF	Khelfinnie Salum	8 January 2001 (aged 20)	0	0	(Tanzania Football Federation) Azam
12	MF	Pascal Gaudence	15 August 2003 (aged 17)	0	0	(Tanzania Football Federation) Azam
13	GK	Daniel Mgore	17 December 2002 (aged 18)	0	0	(Tanzania Football Federation) Biashara United
14	FW	John Bocco	5 August 1989 (aged 31)	78	16	(Tanzania Football Federation) Simba
15	DF	Yassin Mustapha	12 July 1995 (aged 25)	0	0	(Tanzania Football Federation) Young Africans
16	MF	Saidi Ndemla	11 March 1996 (aged 24)	19	1	(Tanzania Football Federation) Simba
17	FW	Faridi Mussa	21 June 1996 (aged 24)	30	0	(Tanzania Football Federation) Young Africans
18	GK	Aishi Manula	13 September 1995 (aged 25)	38	0	(Tanzania Football Federation) Simba
19	FW	Yusufu Mhilu	1 January 1997 (aged 24)	0	0	(Tanzania Football Federation) Kagera Sugar
20	DF	Kalos Protus	21 July 1994 (aged 26)	0	0	(Tanzania Football Federation) Namungo
21	DF	Shomari Kapombe (captain)	28 January 1992 (aged 28)	71	1	(Tanzania Football Federation) Simba
22	MF	Zuberi Dabi	22 August 1994 (aged 26)	0	0	(Tanzania Football Federation) Ruvu Shooting
23	FW	Ayoub Lyanga	23 March 1998 (aged 22)	5	0	(Tanzania Football Federation) Azam
24	FW	Rajab Othmani	27 February 1994 (aged 26)	0	0	(Tanzania Football Federation) Gwambina
25	DF	Ibrahim Ame	12 March 1993 (aged 27)	0	0	(Tanzania Football Federation) Simba
26	MF	Baraka Majogoro	15 May 1996 (aged 24)	1	0	(Tanzania Football Federation) Mtibwa Sugar
27	MF	Deus Kaseke	27 August 1994 (aged 26)	7	0	(Tanzania Football Federation) Young Africans
28	DF	Edward Manyama	2 April 1994 (aged 26)	1	0	(Tanzania Football Federation) Namungo
29	FW	Ditram Nchimbi	10 March 1997 (aged 23)	12	2	(Tanzania Football Federation) Young Africans
