= 2022 African Nations Championship qualification =

Tournament details
- Dates: 22 July – 4 September 2022
- Teams: 42 (from 1 confederation)

Tournament statistics
- Matches played: 54
- Goals scored: 105 (1.94 per match)
- Top scorer(s): (Djibouti) Samuel Akinbinu (Ghana) Daniel Afriyie (Madagascar) Tsilavina Razanakoto (3 goals each)

The 2022 African Nations Championship qualification was a men's football competition which decided the participating teams of the 2022 African Nations Championship. Only national team players who were playing in their country's own domestic league were eligible to compete in the tournament.

A total of 18 teams qualified to play in the final tournament, including Algeria which qualified automatically as hosts.

== Teams ==
A total of 42 (out of 54) CAF member national teams entered the qualifying rounds, split into zones according to their regional affiliations. The draw for the qualifying rounds was held on 26 May 2022 at the CAF headquarters in Cairo, Egypt.

| Zone | Spots (total 18) | Teams entering qualification | Did not enter |
|---|---|---|---|
| Northern Zone (UNAF) | 2 spots+ **Algeria** (hosts) | **Libya**; **Morocco** | Tunisia; Egypt |
| Western Zone A (WAFU-UFOA A) | 3 spots | Cape Verde; Guinea; Guinea-Bissau; Liberia; **Mali**; **Mauritania**; **Senegal**; Gambia; Sierra Leone | |
| Western Zone B (WAFU-UFOA B) | 3 spots | Benin; Burkina Faso; **Ghana**; **Ivory Coast**; **Niger**; Nigeria; Togo | |
| Central Zone (UNIFFAC) | 3 spots | Central African Republic; Chad; **Congo**; **DR Congo**; Equatorial Guinea; **Cameroon** | São Tomé and Príncipe; Gabon |
| Central Eastern Zone (CECAFA) | 3 spots | Burundi; Djibouti; **Ethiopia**; Rwanda; Somalia; South Sudan; **Sudan**; Tanzania; **Uganda** | Eritrea; Kenya |
| Southern Zone (COSAFA) | 3 spots | **Angola**; Botswana; Comoros; Eswatini; **Madagascar**; Malawi; Mauritius; **Mozambique**; Seychelles; South Africa; Zambia; ~~Zimbabwe~~ | Namibia; Lesotho |

Notes

- Teams in **bold** qualified for the final tournament.
- Teams in italics received a bye to the second round in the qualifying draw.
- (W): Withdrew after draw

== Format ==
Qualification ties were played on a home-and-away two-legged basis. If the aggregate score was tied after the second leg, the away goals rule would be applied, and if still level, the penalty shoot-out would be used to determine the winner (no extra time would be played).

== Schedule ==
The schedule of the qualifying rounds was as follows.

| Zone / Round | | Matchday | Date |
| Western Zone A Western Zone B Central Zone Central Eastern Zone | Southern Zone | Matchday | Date |
|---|---|---|---|
| First round | First round | First leg | 22–24 July 2022 |
| First round | First round | Second leg | 26–31 July 2022 |
| Second round | Second round | First leg | 26–29 August 2022 |
| Second round | Second round | Second leg | 2–4 September 2022 |

== Northern Zone ==
Algeria qualified as host nation.

After Egypt and Tunisia withdrew before the draw, Libya and Morocco were the only teams entered: therefore, the Zone was scratched and both teams qualified.

== Western Zone A ==
=== First round ===
| Team 1 | Agg. | Team 2 | 1st leg | 2nd leg |
|---|---|---|---|---|
| Liberia | 2–4 | Senegal | 0–3 | 2–1 |
| Sierra Leone | 3–2 | Cape Verde | 2–0 | 1–2 |
| Gambia | 1–1 (3–5 p) | Guinea-Bissau | 1–0 | 0–1 |

24 July 2022

| Liberia | 0–3 | Senegal |
|---|---|---|
| | Report | Sambou 15'; Ndour 31'; Diouf 34' |

Samuel Kanyon Doe Sports Complex, Paynesville
30 July 2022

| Senegal | 1–2 | Liberia |
|---|---|---|
| Ndour 35' | Report; Report | Kromah; Andrews 88' (pen.) |

Diamniadio Olympic Stadium, Dakar

Senegal won 4–2 on aggregate.

24 July 2022

| Sierra Leone | 2–0 | Cape Verde |
|---|---|---|
| Conteh 15', 65' | Report |

Marrakesh Stadium, Marrakesh
27 July 2022

| Cape Verde | 2–1 | Sierra Leone |
|---|---|---|
| Kelton 84'; Gielson 90+1' | Report; Report | Barrie 39' |

Marrakesh Stadium, Marrakesh

Sierra Leone won 3–2 on aggregate.

23 July 2022

| Gambia | 1–0 | Guinea-Bissau |
|---|---|---|
| Barry 45' | Report |

Marrakesh Stadium, Marrakesh
26 July 2022

| Guinea-Bissau | 1–0 | Gambia |
|---|---|---|
| Cande 86' | Report |
Penalties
| Penalty scored | 5–3 | Penalty scored Penalty missed |

Marrakesh Stadium, Marrakesh

1–1 on aggregate. Guinea-Bissau won 5–3 on penalties.

=== Second round ===
Winners qualified for 2022 African Nations Championship.

| Team 1 | Agg. | Team 2 | 1st leg | 2nd leg |
|---|---|---|---|---|
| Senegal | 1–1 (5–3 p) | Guinea | 1–0 | 0–1 |
| Sierra Leone | 1–4 | Mali | 1–2 | 0–2 |
| Guinea-Bissau | 0–2 | Mauritania | 0–1 | 0–1 |

27 August 2022

| Senegal | 1–0 | Guinea |
|---|---|---|
| Diagne 59' |

2 September 2022

| Guinea | 1–0 | Senegal |
|---|---|---|
| Dramé 2' |
Penalties
| | 3–5 |

27 August 2022

| Sierra Leone | 1–2 | Mali |
|---|---|---|
| Kamara 90+1' | | Sinayoko 23'; Kamissoko 47' |

3 September 2022

| Mali | 2–0 | Sierra Leone |
|---|---|---|
| Samabaly 35'; Sinayoko 59' |

29 August 2022

| Guinea-Bissau | 0–1 | Mauritania |
|---|---|---|
| | | Mouhsine 24' (pen.) |

2 September 2022

| Mauritania | 1–0 | Guinea-Bissau |
|---|---|---|
| XXX 33' (o.g.) |

== Western Zone B ==
=== First round ===
| Team 1 | Agg. | Team 2 | 1st leg | 2nd leg |
|---|---|---|---|---|
| Ghana | 4–0 | Benin | 3–0 | 1–0 |

24 July 2022

| Ghana | 3–0 | Benin |
|---|---|---|
| Afriyie 25'; Alhassan 49'; Awako 80' | Report |

Cape Coast Sports Stadium, Cape Coast
30 July 2022

| Benin | 0–1 | Ghana |
|---|---|---|
| | Report | Afriyie 81' |

Stade de l'Amitié, Cotonou

Ghana won 4–0 on aggregate.

=== Second round ===
Winners qualified for 2022 African Nations Championship.

| Team 1 | Agg. | Team 2 | 1st leg | 2nd leg |
|---|---|---|---|---|
| Ivory Coast | 0–0 (5–3 p) | Burkina Faso | 0–0 | 0–0 |
| Togo | 2–3 | Niger | 1–0 | 1–3 |
| Ghana | 2–2 (5–4 p) | Nigeria | 2–0 | 0–2 |

27 August 2022

| Ivory Coast | 0–0 | Burkina Faso |

4 September 2022

| Burkina Faso | 0–0 | Ivory Coast |
Penalties
| | 3–5 |

28 August 2022

| Togo | 1–0 | Niger |
|---|---|---|
| Agoro 56' |

3 September 2022

| Niger | 3–1 | Togo |
|---|---|---|
| Haïnikoye 45+3'; Garba 77'; Mossi 90+4' (pen.) | | Akoro 49' |

28 August 2022
18:00 UTC+1

| Ghana | 2–0 | Nigeria |
|---|---|---|
| Afriyie 49'; Suraj 86' |

3 September 2022
18:00 UTC+1

| Nigeria | 2–0 | Ghana |
|---|---|---|
| Rabiu 76'; Akuneto 90+4' (pen.) |
Penalties
| | 4–5 |

== Central Zone ==
Winners qualified for 2022 African Nations Championship.

| Team 1 | Agg. | Team 2 | 1st leg | 2nd leg |
|---|---|---|---|---|
| Central African Republic | 2–2 | Congo | 2–1 | 0–1 |
| Equatorial Guinea | 1–2 | Cameroon | 1–0 | 0–2 |
| Chad | 1–7 | DR Congo | 1–2 | 0–5 |

28 August 2022

| Central African Republic | 2–1 | Congo |
|---|---|---|
| Toropité 7'; Mokonou 33' | | Bidimbou 44' (pen.) |

4 September 2022

| Congo | 1–0 | Central African Republic |
|---|---|---|
| Bidimbou 64' (pen.) |

28 August 2022

| Equatorial Guinea | 1–0 | Cameroon |
|---|---|---|
| Pedro Oba 23' |

4 September 2022

| Cameroon | 2–0 | Equatorial Guinea |
|---|---|---|
| Kaiba 42'; Marou 44' |

28 August 2022

| Chad | 1–2 | DR Congo |
|---|---|---|
| Djibrine 50' (pen.) | | Bossu 17'; Kinzumbi 43' |

4 September 2022

| DR Congo | 5–0 | Chad |
|---|---|---|
| Makusu 31', 60'; Mpia 65'; Luzolo 82'; Kinzumbi 90' |

== Central Eastern Zone ==
=== First round ===
| Team 1 | Agg. | Team 2 | 1st leg | 2nd leg |
|---|---|---|---|---|
| Ethiopia | 5–0 | South Sudan | 0–0 | 5–0 |
| Somalia | 1–3 | Tanzania | 0–1 | 1–2 |
| Burundi | 3–3 (2–4 p) | Djibouti | 2–1 | 1–2 |

22 July 2022

| Ethiopia | 0–0 | South Sudan |
|---|---|---|
| | Report |

Benjamin Mkapa Stadium, Dar es Salaam
28 July 2022

| South Sudan | 0–5 | Ethiopia |
|---|---|---|
| | Report | Yusef 32'; Gebremichael 33'; Meeker 66' (o.g.); Mohammed 86'; Bogale 90' |

Benjamin Mkapa Stadium, Dar es Salaam

Ethiopia won 5–0 on aggregate.

23 July 2022

| Somalia | 0–1 | Tanzania |
|---|---|---|
| | Report | Suleiman 46' |

Benjamin Mkapa Stadium, Dar es Salaam
30 July 2022

| Tanzania | 2–1 | Somalia |
|---|---|---|
| Suleiman 34'; Job 64' | Report; Report | Ahmed 47' |

Benjamin Mkapa Stadium, Dar es Salaam

Tanzania won 3–1 on aggregate.

24 July 2022

| Burundi | 2–1 | Djibouti |
|---|---|---|
| Muderi 17'; Urasenga 78' | Report | Akinbinu 34' |

Benjamin Mkapa Stadium, Dar es Salaam
29 July 2022

| Djibouti | 2–1 | Burundi |
|---|---|---|
| Dadzie 52'; Akinbinu 83' | Report; Report | Gakiza 43' |
Penalties
| Penalty scored | 4–2 | Penalty missed Penalty scored |

Benjamin Mkapa Stadium, Dar es Salaam

3–3 on aggregate. Djibouti won 4–2 on penalties.

=== Second round ===
Winners qualified for 2022 African Nations Championship.

| Team 1 | Agg. | Team 2 | 1st leg | 2nd leg |
|---|---|---|---|---|
| Ethiopia | 1–0 | Rwanda | 0–0 | 1–0 |
| Tanzania | 0–4 | Uganda | 0–1 | 0–3 |
| Djibouti | 3–7 | Sudan | 1–4 | 2–3 |

26 August 2022

| Ethiopia | 0–0 | Rwanda |

3 September 2022

| Rwanda | 0–1 | Ethiopia |
|---|---|---|
| | | Hotessa 22' |

28 August 2022

| Tanzania | 0–1 | Uganda |
|---|---|---|
| | | Mutyaba 88' |

3 September 2022

| Uganda | 3–0 | Tanzania |
|---|---|---|
| Waiswa 17' (pen.); Basangwa 56'; Mato 76' |

26 August 2022

| Djibouti | 1–4 | Sudan |
|---|---|---|
| Hassan | | Alsamani; Muhamed; Yaser |

2 September 2022

| Sudan | 3–2 | Djibouti |
|---|---|---|
| Al-Shoala 3'; Alsamani 32'; Al-Teket 42' | | Akinbinu (XX); Mahabeh (XX) |

== Southern Zone ==
=== First round ===
| Team 1 | Agg. | Team 2 | 1st leg | 2nd leg |
|---|---|---|---|---|
| Mauritius | 0–3 | Angola | 0–2 | 0–1 |
| Comoros | 0–1 | South Africa | 0–1 | 0–0 |
| Botswana | 2–2 (a) | Eswatini | 0–0 | 2–2 |
| Seychelles | 0–4 | Madagascar | 0–1 | 0–3 |
| Malawi | awd. | Zimbabwe | Cancelled | Cancelled |
| Mozambique | 1–0 | Zambia | 0–0 | 1–0 |

24 July 2022

| Mauritius | 0–2 | Angola |
|---|---|---|
| | Report | Carneiro 13'; Balisson 65' (o.g.) |

Complexe Sportif de Côte d'Or, Saint Pierre
30 July 2022

| Angola | 1–0 | Mauritius |
|---|---|---|
| Megue | Report |

Estádio 11 de Novembro, Luanda

Angola won 3–0 on aggregate.

22 July 2022

| Comoros | 0–1 | South Africa |
|---|---|---|
| | Report | Shezi 74' |

Complexe Sportif de Côte d'Or, Saint Pierre
30 July 2022

| South Africa | 0–0 | Comoros |
|---|---|---|
| | Report |

Dobsonville Stadium, Soweto

South Africa won 1–0 on aggregate.

23 July 2022

| Botswana | 0–0 | Eswatini |
|---|---|---|
| | Report |

Obed Itani Chilume Stadium, Francistown
31 July 2022

| Eswatini | 2–2 | Botswana |
|---|---|---|
| Gamedze 14'; Mamba 51' | Report; Report; Report; Report | Tauyatswala 46'; Setsile 78' (pen.) |

Orlando Stadium, Soweto

2–2 on aggregate. Botswana won on away goals rule.

23 July 2022

| Seychelles | 0–1 | Madagascar |
|---|---|---|
| | Report | Andrianarimanana 24' |

Complexe Sportif de Côte d'Or, Saint Pierre
31 July 2022

| Madagascar | 3–0 | Seychelles |
|---|---|---|
| Razanakoto 5', 90+3'; Raherinaivo 68' | Report; Report; Report |

Mahamasina Municipal Stadium, Antananarivo

Madagascar won 4–0 on aggregate.

23 July 2022

| Malawi | Cancelled | Zimbabwe |

29 July 2022

| Zimbabwe | Cancelled | Malawi |

Malawi advanced on walkover.

24 July 2022

| Mozambique | 0–0 | Zambia |
|---|---|---|
| | Report |

Estádio do Zimpeto, Maputo
30 July 2022

| Zambia | 0–1 | Mozambique |
|---|---|---|
| | Report; Report | Lau King |

National Heroes Stadium, Lusaka

Mozambique won 1–0 on aggregate.

=== Second round ===
Winners qualified for 2022 African Nations Championship.

| Team 1 | Agg. | Team 2 | 1st leg | 2nd leg |
|---|---|---|---|---|
| Angola | 6–1 | South Africa | 2–0 | 4–1 |
| Botswana | 1–2 | Madagascar | 0–1 | 1–1 |
| Malawi | 1–1 | Mozambique | 1–1 | 0–0 |

28 August 2022

| Angola | 2–0 | South Africa |
|---|---|---|
| Danilson 13'; Teixiera 68' | Report |

Estádio 11 de Novembro, Luanda
4 September 2022

| South Africa | 1–4 | Angola |
|---|---|---|
| Nxumalo 5' | | Lebusa 39' (o.g.); Gilberto 67'; Jó Paciência 72'; Danilson 78' |

Dobsonville Stadium, Soweto

27 August 2022

| Botswana | 0–1 | Madagascar |
|---|---|---|
| | | Razanakoto 17' |

Obed Itani Chilume Stadium, Francistown
2 September 2022

| Madagascar | 1–1 | Botswana |
|---|---|---|
| Ravelomanantsoa 23' | Report | Ditsele 66' |

Mahamasina Municipal Stadium, Antananarivo

27 August 2022

| Malawi | 1–1 | Mozambique |
|---|---|---|
| Chester 22' | | Devrason 8' |

Bingu National Stadium, Lilongwe
4 September 2022

| Mozambique | 0–0 | Malawi |

Estádio do Zimpeto, Maputo

== Qualified teams ==
The following 18 teams qualified for the final tournament.

| Team | Qualifying zone | Qualified on | Previous appearances in African Nations Championship^{1} |
|---|---|---|---|
| Algeria (hosts) | Northern Zone | 29 September 2018 | 1 (2011) |
| Morocco | Northern Zone | 26 May 2022 | 4 (2014, 2016, 2018, 2020) |
| Libya | Northern Zone | 26 May 2022 | 4 (2009, 2014, 2018, 2020) |
| Senegal | Western Zone A | 2 September 2022 | 2 (2009, 2011) |
| Mauritania | Western Zone A | 2 September 2022 | 2 (2014, 2018) |
| Mali | Western Zone A | 3 September 2022 | 4 (2011, 2014, 2016, 2020) |
| Niger | Western Zone B | 3 September 2022 | 3 (2011, 2016, 2020) |
| Ghana | Western Zone B | 3 September 2022 | 3 (2009, 2011, 2014) |
| Ivory Coast | Western Zone B | 4 September 2022 | 4 (2009, 2011, 2016, 2018) |
| DR Congo | Central Zone | 4 September 2022 | 5 (2009, 2011, 2014, 2016, 2020) |
| Congo | Central Zone | 4 September 2022 | 3 (2014, 2018, 2020) |
| Cameroon | Central Zone | 4 September 2022 | 4 (2011, 2016, 2018, 2020) |
| Sudan | Central Eastern Zone | 2 September 2022 | 2 (2011, 2018) |
| Ethiopia | Central Eastern Zone | 3 September 2022 | 2 (2014, 2016) |
| Uganda | Central Eastern Zone | 3 September 2022 | 5 (2011, 2014, 2016, 2018, 2020) |
| Madagascar | Southern Zone | 2 September 2022 | 0 (debut) |
| Angola | Southern Zone | 4 September 2022 | 3 (2011, 2016, 2018) |
| Mozambique | Southern Zone | 4 September 2022 | 1 (2014) |

== Goalscorers ==
There were 105 goals scored in 54 matches, for an average of 1.94 goals per match.

3 goals

- (Djibouti) Samuel Akinbinu
- (Ghana) Daniel Afriyie
- (Madagascar) Tsilavina Razanakoto

2 goals

- (Angola) Danilson
- (Republic of the Congo) Kader Bidimbou
- (Democratic Republic of the Congo) Phillippe Kinzumbi
- (Democratic Republic of the Congo) Jean-Marc Makusu Mundele
- (Senegal) Ramond Ndour
- (Sierra Leone) Alie Conteh
- (Sudan) Mohamed Abdelrahman
- (Sudan) Alsamani Alsawi
- (Tanzania) Abdul Suleiman

1 goal

- (Angola) Augusto Carneiro
- (Angola) Pedro Pessoa Miguel
- (Angola) Jó Paciência
- (Angola) Jaredi Teixiera
- (Angola) Deivi Miguel Vieira
- (Botswana) Mothusi Johnson
- (Botswana) Thero Setsile
- (Botswana) Godfrey Tauyatswala
- (Burundi) Aimé Gakiza
- (Burundi) Akbar Muderi
- (Burundi) Cédric Urasenga
- (Cameroon) Djawal Kaiba
- (Cameroon) Souaibou Marou
- (Cape Verde) Gielson
- (Cape Verde) Kelton
- (Central African Republic) Delphin Mokonou
- (Central African Republic) Tresór Toropité
- (Chad) Bakhit Djibrine
- (Democratic Republic of the Congo) Adam Bossu
- (Democratic Republic of the Congo) Ernest Luzolo
- (Democratic Republic of the Congo) Maxi Mpia
- (Djibouti) Gabriel Dadzie
- (Djibouti) Warsama Hassan
- (Djibouti) Mahdi Houssein Mahabeh
- (Equatorial Guinea) Pedro Oba
- (Eswatini) Sandile Gamedze
- (Eswatini) Fanelo Mamba
- (Ethiopia) Yigezu Bogale
- (Ethiopia) Amanuel Gebremichael
- (Ethiopia) Dawa Hotessa
- (Ethiopia) Mesud Mohammed
- (Ethiopia) Ramadan Yusef
- (The Gambia) Alieu Barry
- (Ghana) Mohammed Alhassan
- (Ghana) Gladson Awako
- (Ghana) Seidu Suraj
- (Guinea) Ousmane Dramé
- (Guinea-Bissau) Botche Cande
- (Liberia) Nicholas Andrews
- (Liberia) Sidiki Kromah
- (Madagascar) Arohasina Andrianarimanana
- (Madagascar) Rinjala Raherinaivo
- (Madagascar) Marcio Ravelomanantsoa
- (Malawi) Yamikani Chester
- (Mali) Ousmane Kamissoko
- (Mali) Makan Samabaly
- (Mali) Issaka Samaké
- (Mali) Hamidou Sinayoko
- (Mauritania) Bodda Mouhsine
- (Mozambique) Devrason
- (Mozambique) Pachoio Lau Há King
- (Niger) Abdoul Garba
- (Niger) Boubacar Haïnikoye
- (Niger) Mossi Issa Moussa
- (Nigeria) Chijioke Akuneto
- (Nigeria) Zulkifilu Rabiu
- (Senegal) Mélèye Diagne
- (Senegal) Jean Louis Diouf
- (Senegal) Bouly Sambou
- (Sierra Leone) Prince Barrie
- (Sierra Leone) Musa Noah Kamara
- (Somalia) Farhan Mohamed Ahmed
- (South Africa) Prince Nxumalo
- (South Africa) Khulekani Shezi
- (Sudan) Waleed Al-Shoala
- (Sudan) Muhamed Al-Teket
- (Sudan) Yaser Muzmel
- (Tanzania) Dickson Job
- (Togo) Ashraf Agoro
- (Togo) Bilal Akoro
- (Uganda) Richard Basangwa
- (Uganda) Rogers Mato
- (Uganda) Travis Mutyaba
- (Uganda) Moses Waiswa

1 own goal

- (Guinea-Bissau) XXX (against Mauritania)
- (Mauritius) Damien Balisson (against Angola)
- (South Africa) Mosa Lebusa (against Angola)
- (South Sudan) Peter Meeker (against Ethiopia)
