= Ballo (disambiguation) =

Ballo is an Italian dance form during the fifteenth century.

Ballo may also refer to:

== Footballers ==
- Moussa Ballo (footballer, born 1994), Ivorian football defender, has played for various clubs in various countries
- Moussa Ballo (footballer, born 1996), Malian football left-back, plays for Real Bamako and Mali
- Oumar Ballo, Malian footballer, played for various MLS clubs
- Thierno Ballo (born 2002), Ivorian footballer, plays for Wolfsberger AC and Austria

== Other ==
- Olav Gunnar Ballo, a Norwegian former politician
- Oumar Ballo (basketball) a Malian college basketball player
