= Moussa Ballo =

Moussa Ballo may refer to:

- Moussa Ballo (footballer, born 1994), Ivorian football defender
- Moussa Ballo (footballer, born 1996), Malian football left-back
