= Sinayoko =

Sinayoko is a surname. Notable people with the surname include:

- Hamidou Sinayoko (born 1986), Malian footballer
- Lassine Sinayoko (born 1999), Malian footballer
