= ZESCO United F.C. =

Association football club in Zambia

ZESCO United
- Zambia
- Full name: ZESCO United Football Club
- Nicknames: Zega Mambo, Team Ya Ziko
- Short name: Zesco
- Founded: 1 January 1974; 52 years ago
- Stadium: Levy Mwanawasa Stadium, Ndola
- Capacity: 49,800
- Owner: ZESCO
- Chairman: Richard Mulenga
- Manager: George Lwandamina
- League: Zambia Super League
- 2025–26: 10th
- Website: http://www.zescounitedfc.co.zm/
Green and Orange colours	White and green colours

ZESCO United Football Club (simply often known as ZESCO) is a Zambian professional football club based in Ndola, that competes in the Zambia Super League. Founded in 1974, the team plays its home matches at the Levy Mwanawasa Stadium.

The club is wholly owned and sponsored by the state owned electricity supplier ZESCO.

== History and records ==
ZESCO United was founded in 1974. They became the first Zambian club to qualify for the CAF Champions League group stage in 2009. ZESCO United are one of only 3 Zambian clubs including Nkana and Green Buffaloes who hold an all time unbeaten home record against non Zambian opposition. ZESCO United also became the first Zambian Club in the 21st century to play against European opposition when they played against Zenit Saint Petersburg in Abu Dhabi in 2008.

They reached their first ever semi finals of the CAF African Champions League after a 2–2 draw away to Egyptian league champions Al Ahly in Matchday 5 of the 2016 CAF Champions' League quarter final group stage.

They extended their all time unbeaten home record against non Zambian teams to 26 games on Saturday, 17 September 2016, after a 2–1 home win against South African league champions Mamelodi Sundowns in the CAF Champions League.

The club became the first Zambian club to sign an Asian player, Kosuke Nakamachi from Japan.

In April 2026, the club was suspended from the Zambian Premier League for taking its grievance on being disqualified from the ABSA Cup to a public court of law.

== Stadium ==
Before mid-2012, ZESCO United played its home games at the Trade Fair grounds in the industrial area of Ndola. After the Levy Mwanawasa Stadium opened in June 2012, ZESCO United shifted to playing its home games at the new stadium. The Trade Fair grounds remain a venue for ZESCO United to host matches when they need an alternative venue from the Levy Mwanawasa Stadium, such as when the stadium has scheduled maintenance works.

== Achievements ==
- Zambian Premier League: 9

2007, 2008, 2010, 2014, 2015, 2017, 2018, 2019, 2020–21
Runner up : 2005, 2009, 2013, 2016, 2021–22, 2023–24, 2024–25

- Zambian Cup: 1

2006
Finalist : 2007

- Zambian Charity Shield: 5

2007, 2011, 2015, 2017, 2021

- ABSA Cup: 6

2007, 2008, 2010, 2014, 2016, 2019, 2025
Finalist : 2021

- Zambian Coca-Cola Cup: 1

2007

- Zambian Division One: 2

1980, 2003

== Performance in CAF competitions ==
- CAF Champions League: 9 appearances

2008 – last 32
2009 – group stage (top 8)
2011 – last 16
2015 – last 32
2016 – semi-finals
2018 – group stage (top 16)
2019 – first round
2020 – group stage (top 16)
2022 – preliminary round

- CAF Confederation Cup: 6 appearances

2006 – first round
2010 – first round
2013 – last 16
2014 – second round
2017 – quarter-finals
2019 – group stage (top 16)

== Players ==
=== Current squad ===
As of 13 Dec 2025. Note: Flags indicate national team as defined under FIFA eligibility rules; some limited exceptions apply. Players may hold more than one non-FIFA nationality.

No.	Pos.	Nation	Player
2	DF	ZAM	Solomon Sakala
3	DF	ZAM	Fred Mwiche
5	DF	ZAM	Kabaso Chongo
6	MF	ZAM	David Simukonda
7	MF	ZAM	Kelvin Kampamba
8	FW	NGA	Pepo Ifoni
9	FW	CHA	Amine Hiver
10	FW	ZAM	Alex Ngonga
12	MF	ZAM	Samson Ngoma
13	DF	ZAM	Gift Mphande
14	MF	ZAM	Anthony Chiyuka
17	MF	ZAM	Abraham Siankombo
18	MF	CMR	Vitalis Gantar
19	MF	ZAM	Leonard Mulenga
21	DF	ZAM	Shemmy Mayembe

No.	Pos.	Nation	Player
23	DF	ZAM	Samson Mkandawire
24	MF	ZAM	Pascal Phiri
25	DF	SWZ	Lindo Mkhonta (captain)
26	DF	ZAM	Mathews Chabala
27	FW	NGA	Chijoke Alaekwe
28	MF	ZAM	Peter Musukuma
29	FW	CIV	Freddy Michael
30	DF	ZAM	Benedict Chepeshi
31	MF	BFA	Sibiri Sanou
32	GK	ZAM	Levison Banda
35	GK	NGA	Victor Sochima
39	GK	ZAM	Anthony Kalima
40	GK	ZAM	Philip Sakauta
43	DF	ZAM	Zakaria Chilongoshi

== Former players ==
- (Democratic Republic of the Congo) Marcel Kalonda
