= Alpha Oumar Sow =

Alpha Oumar Sow may refer to:

- Alpha Oumar Sow (Guinean footballer) (born 1997)
- Alpha Oumar Sow (Senegalese footballer) (born 1984)
