= Siame =

Siame is a Zambian surname. Notable people with the surname include:

- David Siame (born 1976), Zambian former football striker
- Gift Siame (born 2006), Zambian footballer
- Lameck Siame (born 1997), Zambian football goalkeeper
- Sydney Siame (born 1997), Zambian sprinter

== See also ==
- Made Siamé (1885–1974), French stage and film actress
- Siam (disambiguation)
