= Nadjib Baouia =

Algerian footballer (born 1992)

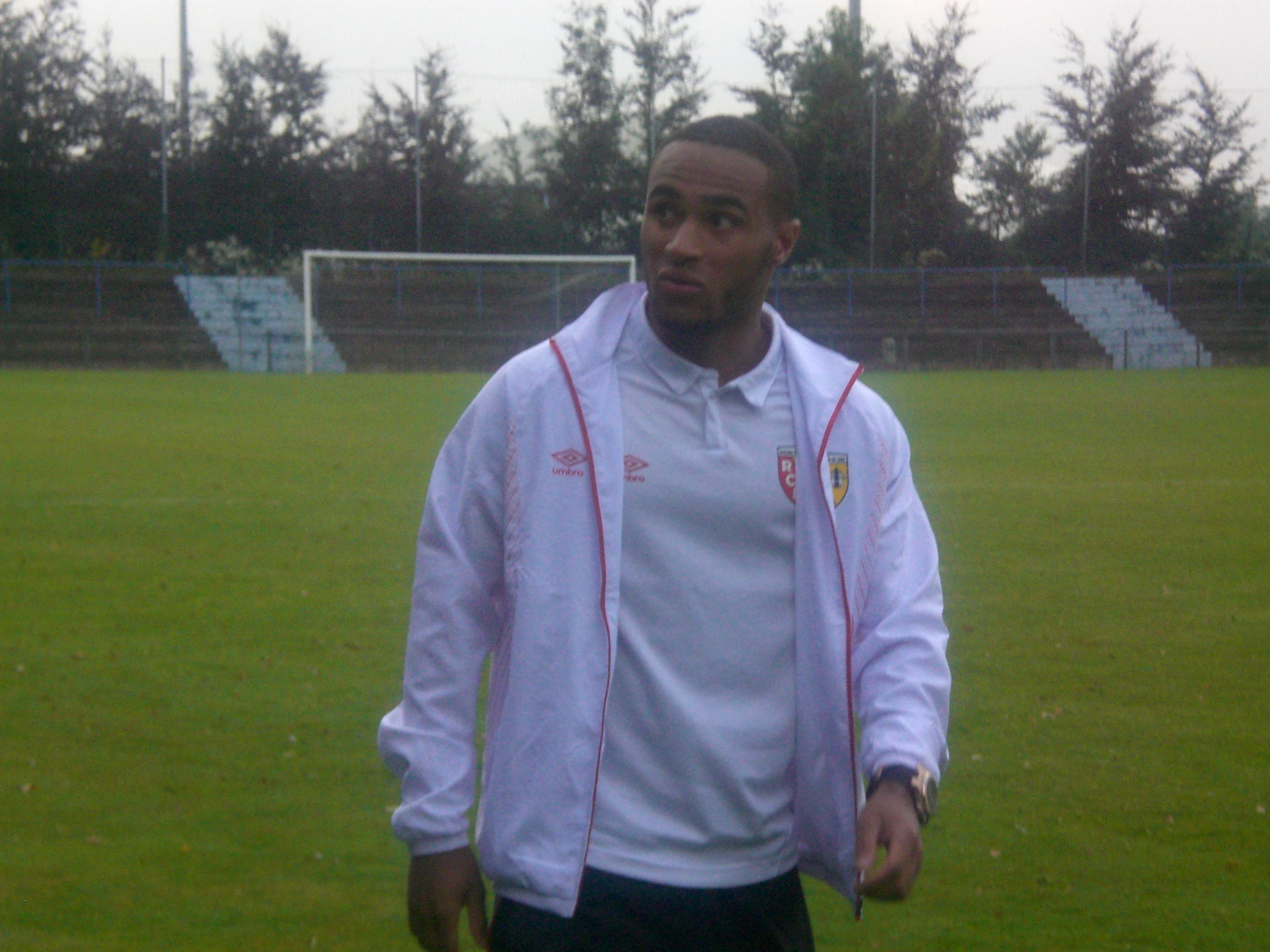
- Baouia in August 2015

Personal information
- Date of birth: 25 February 1992 (age 34)
- Place of birth: El M'Ghair, Algeria
- Height: 1.65 m (5 ft 5 in)
- Position: Forward

Team information
- Current team: Saint-Priest
- Number: 10

Youth career
- AS Buers Villeurbanne
- Caluire SC
- 2011–2013: Evian

Senior career*
Years	Team	Apps	(Gls)
2013–2015	Evian	4	(0)
2015–2017	Lens II	39	(4)
2017	Lens	1	(0)
2017–2020	Cholet	46	(2)
2020–2021	Lyon La Duchère (Note: AS Lyon-Duchère was renamed to SC Lyon in June 2020. The club was again renamed the following year to Lyon La Duchère in June 2021.)	13	(1)
2021–2022	Sète	26	(0)
2022–2023	Créteil	25	(2)
2023–	Saint-Priest	30	(0)
- * Club domestic league appearances and goals as of 9 November 2024

Nadjib Baouia (born 25 February 1992) is an Algerian footballer who plays as a forward for French club Saint-Priest.

== Club career ==
Born in El M'Ghair, Algeria, Baouia joined the youth ranks of Evian in 2011 from Caluire SC. In March 2013, he made his senior league debut as a substitute against Reims in the 30th round of the 2012–13 Ligue 1 season, playing seven minutes. In May, in his second senior appearance he scored his first senior goal in the semi-final of the 2012–13 Coupe de France in the 4–0 win over Lorient. Baouia scored the fourth goal of the game after having made his appearance on the field two minutes prior.

In August 2015, after a successful trial, Baouia signed his first professional contract, a one-year Deal, with a further one-year option, with Ligue 2 RC Lens. After many games with the reserve team in Championnat de France Amateur he made his debut, and only appearance, for the first team as a substitute in the 0–1 defeat by AJ Auxerre on 15 April 2017.

In June 2017, Baouia joined newly promoted Championnat National team SO Cholet.

In January 2020, Baouia joined fellow Championnat National side AS Lyon Duchère (who rebranded as Sporting Club Lyon in June 2020) on a one-and-a-half-year deal.

In June 2021, he moved to Sète, also in Championnat National.

On 13 July 2022, Baouia joined Créteil in Championnat National 2.
