= Khulekani Shezi =

South African soccer player

Personal information
- Date of birth: 10 January 2001 (age 25)
- Position: Midfielder

Team information
- Current team: Sekhukhune United F.C.
- Number: 15

Senior career*
Years	Team	Apps	(Gls)
2022–2025	Royal AM	24	(2)
2025-	Sekhukhune United F.C.	4	(0)

International career^{‡}
2022	South Africa	3	(1)
- * Club domestic league appearances and goals as of 8/6/25 @ 17:50(AEST) ‡ National team caps and goals as of 10 July 2024

Khulekani Shezi (born 10 January 2001) is a South African soccer player who plays as a midfielder for Royal AM in the Premier Soccer League.

After Royal AM won promotion from the 2020-21 National First Division due to buying Bloemfontein Celtic's license, Shezi made his first-tier debut in October 2022 against Moroka Swallows, and scored his first goal in November 2023 against Cape Town Spurs.

He was called up for South Africa for the 2022 COSAFA Cup, where he played twice, including the plate final where South Africa beat Botswana. He was also called up to the 2022 African Nations Championship qualification against the Comoros, where he scored the winning goal which put South Africa through.

In May 2024, he was badly injured during a duel with Lindokuhle Mtshali, in which Shezi's was dislocated and the ligament damaged.
