= Ibrahima Aminata Condé =

Guinean footballer

Personal information
- Date of birth: 5 February 1998 (age 28)
- Position: Defender

Team information
- Current team: Horoya AC

Senior career*
Years	Team	Apps	(Gls)
2013–2015	AS Ashanti Golden Boys		
2015–	Horoya AC		

International career^{‡}
2016–	Guinea	7	(0)
- * Club domestic league appearances and goals as of 12:25, 4 October 2018 (UTC) ‡ National team caps and goals as of 12:25, 4 October 2018 (UTC)

Ibrahima Aminata Condé (born 5 February 1998) is a Guinean international footballer who plays for Horoya AC, as a defender.

== Career ==
He has played club football for AS Ashanti Golden Boys and Horoya AC.

He made his international debut for Guinea in 2016.
