= Marcel Kalonda =

Congolese footballer (born 1998)

Marcel Kabongo Kalonda (born 4 May 1998) is a Congolese footballer who plays as a defender for Kansanshi Dynamos.

== Career ==
In 2017, Kalonda signed for Zambian side ZESCO United, where he played in the CAF Champions League. In 2021, he signed for Zambian side Kabwe Warriors, where he was regarded as one of the club's most important players.

== Style of play ==
Kalonda mainly operates as a defender and is known for his strength.

== Personal life ==
Kalonda was described as "one of the most famous football players in Malaysia, judging by how rapidly his popularity soared in Malaysian social media" after he claimed to be eligible to represent the Malaysia national football team internationally through his grandfather.
