= Sékouba Camara (footballer, born 1997) =

Guinean footballer

Personal information
- Full name: Sékouba Camara
- Date of birth: 22 January 1997 (age 29)
- Place of birth: Guinea
- Height: 1.93 m (6 ft 4 in)
- Position: Goalkeeper

Team information
- Current team: Ashanti Golden Boys

Senior career*
Years	Team	Apps	(Gls)
2016–2017	Athlético de Coléah		
2017	Hapoel Ra'anana		
2018–2021	Kaloum Star		
2021–2022	Adama City	18	(0)
2023–	Ashanti Golden Boys		

International career
2017	Guinea U20	5	(0)
2019–2021	Guinea	2	(0)
- * Club domestic league appearances and goals

Sékouba Camara (born 22 January 1997) is a Guinean professional footballer who plays as a goalkeeper for Guinée Championnat National club Ashanti Golden Boys.
