= Mouhsine Bodda =

Mauritanian footballer

Personal information
- Full name: Mouhsine Bodda
- Date of birth: 18 July 1997 (age 29)
- Place of birth: Teyarett, Mauritania
- Height: 1.75 m (5 ft 9 in)
- Position: Midfielder

Team information
- Current team: AS Douanes

Senior career*
Years	Team	Apps	(Gls)
2017–2018	ACS Ksar		
2018–2020	FC Tevragh-Zeina		
2020–2024	FC Nouadhibou		
2024–2025	Raja CA	26	(0)
2025–	AS Douanes		

International career^{‡}
2017–	Mauritania	51	(1)
- * Club domestic league appearances and goals as of 23:14, 6 July 2025 (UTC) ‡ National team caps and goals as of 20:55, 18 July 2026 (UTC)

Mouhsine Bodda (born 18 July 1997) is a Mauritanian footballer who plays as a midfielder for AS Douanes and the Mauritania national team.

== Career statistics ==
=== International ===
As of match played 14 October 2025

Appearances and goals by national team and year
National team	Year	Apps	Goals
Mauritania	2017	3	0
Mauritania	2018	–	
Mauritania	2019	4	0
Mauritania	2020	–	
Mauritania	2021	5	0
Mauritania	2022	7	1
Mauritania	2023	11	0
Mauritania	2024	13	0
Mauritania	2025	8	0
Total		51	1

Scores and results list Mauritania's goal tally first, score column indicates score after each Bodda goal.

List of international goals scored by Mouhsine Bodda
No.	Date	Venue	Opponent	Score	Result	Competition
1	29 August 2022	Cheikha Ould Boïdiya Stadium, Nouakchott, Mauritania	Guinea-Bissau	1–0	1–0	2022 African Nations Championship qualification
