= Mohamed Camara (footballer, born 1999) =

Guinean footballer

Personal information
- Date of birth: 9 July 1999 (age 27)
- Place of birth: Conakry, Guinea
- Position: Defender

Team information
- Current team: Ashanti GB

Senior career*
| Years | Team | Apps | (Gls) |
| 2015–2016 | Wakriya | | |
| 2016–2018 | AS Mineurs | | |
| 2018–2019 | Lélou | | |
| 2019– | Ashanti GB | | |

International career^{‡}
| 2021– | Guinea | 1 | (0) |
- * Club domestic league appearances and goals as of 23 December 2021 ‡ National team caps and goals as of 23 December 2021

Mohamed Camara (born 9 July 1999) is a Guinean footballer who currently plays as a defender for Ashanti GB.

== Career statistics ==
=== International ===
As of matches played 23 December 2021.

Appearances and goals by national team and year
| National team | Year | Apps | Goals |
|---|---|---|---|
| Guinea | 2021 | 1 | 0 |
| Total | | 1 | 0 |
