= Abdoul-Halimou Sama =

Togolese footballer

Personal information
- Date of birth: 28 July 2002 (age 24)
- Place of birth: Sokodé, Togo
- Position: Defender

Team information
- Current team: ASKO Kara

Senior career*
Years	Team	Apps	(Gls)
2020–	ASKO Kara	–	(–)

International career^{‡}
2021–	Togo	6	(1)
- * Club domestic league appearances and goals ‡ National team caps and goals as of 28 July 2026

Abdoul-Halimou Sama (born 28 July 2002) is a Togolese footballer who plays as a defender for Togolese Championnat National club ASKO Kara.

== Club career ==
Sama started his career with ASKO Kara in 2020.

== International career ==
In January 2021, Sama was given his maiden call up into the Togo national team by Jean-Paul Abalo as he was named on the Togolese squad for the 2020 African Nations Championship. He made his debut on 22 January 2021, after playing the full 90 minute in their second Group C match against Uganda which ended in a 2–1 victory for Togo. He went on and played whole match of the last group match against Rwanda which they lost. In March 2021, he was called up to the senior side by Claude Le Roy, as one of the 13 local-based players ahead of their 2021 AFCON qualifiers against Comoros and Kenya.

== Honours ==
ASKO Kara

- Togolese Championnat National: 2020–21, 2021–22, 2022–23

Individual

- Best Defender of the Season (Kara Region): 2020–21

== Career statistics ==
=== International ===
As of match played 22 December 2024

Appearances and goals by national team and year
National team	Year	Apps	Goals
Togo	2021	2	0
Togo	2022	–	
Togo	2023	–	
Togo	2024	4	1
Total		6	1

Scores and results list Togo's goal tally first, score column indicates score after each Sama goal.

List of international goals scored by Abdoul-Halimou Sama
No.	Date	Venue	Opponent	Score	Result	Competition
1	22 December 2024	Stade de Kégué, Lomé, Togo	Niger	1–0	1–1	2024 African Nations Championship qualification
