= René Zoungrana =

Burkinabé footballer

Personal information
- Date of birth: 18 December 1996 (age 29)
- Place of birth: Kounda, Burkina Faso
- Position: Defender

Team information
- Current team: AS Douanes
- Number: 24

Senior career*
Years	Team	Apps	(Gls)
2015–2017	ASFA Yennenga		
2017–2020	RC Kadiogo		
2020–2022	USFA		
2022–2024	AS Vita Club		
2024-	AS Douanes		

International career^{‡}
2019–	Burkina Faso	3	(0)
- * Club domestic league appearances and goals as of 16:01, 6 June 2021 (UTC) ‡ National team caps and goals as of 16:01, 6 June 2021 (UTC)

René Zoungrana (born 18 December 1996) is a Burkinabé football defender who plays for USFA. He was a squad member for the 2020 African Nations Championship.
