= AS Saint-Priest =

French football club, based in Lyon

Saint-Priest
- Full name: Association Sportive de Saint-Priest
- Nicknames: Les Sang et Or (The Blood and Gold)
- Founded: 1945; 81 years ago
- Ground: Stade Jacques Joly
- Capacity: 3,000 (698 seated)
- Chairman: Patrick Gonzalez
- Manager: Michael Napoletano
- League: National 1 Group C
- 2024–25: National 2 Group A, 7th of 16
- Website: assaintpriest.fr
| Home colours | Away colours | Third colours |

Association Sportive de Saint-Priest (French pronunciation: [asɔsjɑsjɔ̃ spɔʁtiv də sɛ̃ pʁijɛst]; abbreviated as ASSP) is a French association football team founded in 1945. They are based in Saint-Priest, a suburb of Lyon, France. They currently compete in the Championnat National 1, the fourth tier of French football.

The club's ground, the Stade Jacques Joly, was built in the 1950s and was eventually renovated between 2016 and 2021. It holds a capacity of 3,000 (698 seated).

== History ==
The club was founded in 1945 as Club Sportif de Saint-Priest until 1953 when the club merged with Stade Auto Lyonnais and took on the name of the latter. The club was then renamed to Association Sportive de Saint-Priest in 1980.

== Current squad ==
As of 22 February 2025

Note: Flags indicate national team as defined under FIFA eligibility rules; some limited exceptions apply. Players may hold more than one non-FIFA nationality.

| No. | Pos. | Nation | Player |
|---|---|---|---|
| 1 | GK | FRA | Baddis Haddaoui |
| 16 | GK | FRA | Enzo Calabro |
| 30 | GK | FRA | Thomas Navaux |
| 40 | GK | FRA | Amaury Gebel |
| 4 | DF | FRA | Kenny Oun |
| 5 | DF | FRA | Banfa Fofana |
| 6 | DF | BRA | Helderson Tavares |
| 14 | DF | FRA | Belony Dumas |
| 17 | DF | FRA | Valentin Hoguet |
| 24 | DF | FRA | Stéphane Varsovie |
| 28 | DF | FRA | Théo Gonzalez |
| 8 | MF | CPV | Kelvin Patrick |
| 13 | MF | CMR | Franck Ondoa |
| 19 | MF | FRA | Romain Antunes |
| 20 | MF | FRA | Audran Ruiz |
| 21 | MF | FRA | Guillaume Odru |
| 22 | MF | FRA | Morgan Pottier |
| 29 | MF | FRA | Léo Lafy-Fleury |

| No. | Pos. | Nation | Player |
|---|---|---|---|
| 7 | FW | FRA | Sacha Mila |
| 9 | FW | FRA | Marwane Benhmida |
| 10 | FW | FRA | Nadjib Baouia |
| 11 | FW | FRA | Jasser Chamakh |
| 12 | FW | FRA | Emmanuel Mballa |
| 26 | FW | FRA | El Hadj Coly |
| 27 | FW | FRA | Isaac Karamoko |

== Notable players ==
Youth

- (France) Thierno Barry
- (France) Romain Del Castillo
- (France) Rayan Cherki
- (France) Youri Djorkaeff
- (France) Nabil Fekir
- (France) Luis Fernandez
- (Democratic Republic of the Congo) Gédéon Kalulu
- (France) Pierre Kalulu
- (Georgia (country)) Georges Mikautadze
- (France) Pierrick Valdivia

Senior

- (France) Christophe Delmotte
- (France) Pierre Laigle
