= Isaac Karamoko =

French footballer (born 2002)

Personal information
- Date of birth: 26 May 2002 (age 24)
- Place of birth: Stains, France
- Height: 1.78 m (5 ft 10 in)
- Position: Forward

Team information
- Current team: Strasbourg B

Youth career
- 2014–2020: Paris Saint-Germain
- 2020–2021: Sassuolo

Senior career*
Years	Team	Apps	(Gls)
2021–2022	Sassuolo	1	(0)
2022	→ Apollon Larissa (loan)	17	(3)
2023	Nice B	8	(2)
2023–2024	Grasse	22	(6)
2024–2025	Saint-Priest	25	(5)
2025–	Strasbourg B	16	(5)
- * Club domestic league appearances and goals as of 22 March 2026

Isaac Karamoko (born 26 May 2002) is a French professional footballer who plays as a forward for Championnat National 3 club Strasbourg B.

== Career ==
A former youth academy player of Paris Saint-Germain, Karamoko left the club in June 2020 upon the expiration of his contract. After spending few months as a free agent, he signed his first professional contract with Sassuolo in November 2020. On 7 April 2021, he made his professional debut in a 2–1 league defeat against Inter Milan.

On 1 February 2022, Karamoko was loaned to Apollon Larissa in Greece.

== Personal life ==
Born in France, Karamoko is of Ivorian descent.

== Career statistics ==
As of 7 April 2021

Appearances and goals by club, season and competition
Club	Season	League			Cup		Other		Total	
Club	Season	Division	Apps	Goals	Apps	Goals	Apps	Goals	Apps	Goals
Sassuolo	2020–21	Serie A	1	0	0	0	—		1	0
Career total			1	0	0	0	0	0	1	0
