= Prince Barrie =

Sierra Leonian footballer (born 1997)

Personal information
- Date of birth: 18 August 1997 (age 29)
- Place of birth: Freetown, Sierra Leona
- Height: 1.72 m (5 ft 8 in)
- Position: Midfielder

Team information
- Current team: Chiefs United

Senior career*
Years	Team	Apps	(Gls)
2015	FC Kallon		
2016	International Allies	5	(0)
2016–2017	FC Kallon		
2017–2019	Hafia FC		
2019–2022	Bo Rangers		
2022-2024	East End Lions		
2024-	Chiefs United		

International career^{‡}
2017–	Sierra Leone	12	(1)
- * Club domestic league appearances and goals as of 19:28, 16 April 2026 (UTC) ‡ National team caps and goals as of 19:28, 16 April 2026 (UTC)

Prince Barrie (born 18 August 1997) is a Sierra Leonean footballer who plays as a Midfielder for Chiefs United and the Sierra Leone national team.

== International career ==
=== International goals ===
Scores and results list Sierra Leone's goal tally first.

No.	Date	Venue	Opponent	Score	Result	Competition
1.	27 July 2022	Stade de Marrakech, Marrakesh, Morocco	Cape Verde	1–0	1–2	2022 African Nations Championship qualification
