= Clement Mwape =

Zambian footballer (born 1989)

Personal information
- Date of birth: 28 February 1989 (age 37)
- Place of birth: Zambia
- Position: Defender

Team information
- Current team: ZESCO United F.C.
- Number: 27

Senior career*
Years	Team	Apps	(Gls)
2014–2015	Konkola Mine Police		
2015–2017	Nchanga Rangers		
2017–2018	City of Lusaka		
2018–	ZESCO United F.C.		

International career^{‡}
2019–	Zambia	4	(0)
- * Club domestic league appearances and goals ‡ National team caps and goals as of 13 October 2019

Clement Mwape (born 28 February 1989) is a Zambian footballer who plays as a defender for ZESCO United F.C. and the Zambia national football team.
