= Wesley Katjiteo =

Namibian footballer

Personal information
- Date of birth: 17 February 1990 (age 36)
- Place of birth: Okondjatu, Namibia
- Position: Attacking midfielder

Senior career*
Years	Team	Apps	(Gls)
2017–2018	Young Africans		
2018–2019	Black Africa		
2019–2020	TS Sporting	9	(0)
2020–202?	Black Africa		

International career
2019–2022	Namibia	16	(0)
- * Club domestic league appearances and goals as of 23:36, 28 February 2022 (UTC)

Wesley Katjiteo (born 17 February 1990) is a Namibian footballer who plays as an attacking midfielder.
