= Alpha Oumar Sow (Guinean footballer) =

Guinean footballer

Personal information
- Date of birth: 15 August 1997 (age 29)
- Place of birth: Guinea
- Position: Midfielder

Team information
- Current team: Ashanti GB

Senior career*
Years	Team	Apps	(Gls)
2018–2020	Lélou FC		
2020–	Ashanti GB		

International career^{‡}
2019–	Guinea	6	(0)
- * Club domestic league appearances and goals ‡ National team caps and goals as of 05:57, 21 September 2021 (UTC)

Alpha Oumar Sow (born 15 August 1997) is a Guinean professional footballer who plays as a midfielder for Guinée Championnat National club Ashanti GB and the Guinea national team.
