= Djawal Kaiba =

Cameroonian footballer

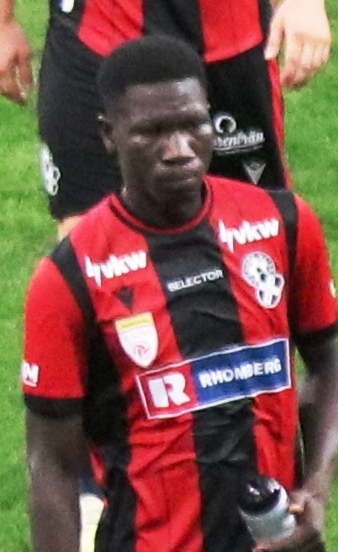
- Kaiba in 2024

Personal information
- Date of birth: 8 February 2003 (age 23)
- Place of birth: Cameroon
- Height: 1.86 m (6 ft 1 in)
- Position: Midfielder

Team information
- Current team: FC Wil
- Number: 13

Youth career
- Coton Sport

Senior career*
Years	Team	Apps	(Gls)
2019–2023	Coton Sport		
2023–2024	Rheindorf Altach II	17	(3)
2024–2025	Rheindorf Altach	17	(1)
2024	→Schwarz-Weiß Bregenz (loan)	9	(2)
2025–	FC Wil	34	(2)

International career^{‡}
2022–2023	Cameroon	5	(2)
2025–	Chad	4	(0)
- * Club domestic league appearances and goals as of 30 September 2026 ‡ National team caps and goals as of 31 March 2026

Djawal Kaiba (born 8 February 2003) is a professional footballer who plays as a midfielder for the Swiss Challenge League club FC Wil. Born in Cameroon, and a former international for the Cameroon national team, he plays for the Chad national team.

== Club career ==
A youth product of Coton Sport, Kaiba debuted with them in 2019, and helped them win three consecutive Elite Ones from 2021 to 2023. On 7 June 2023, he transferred to the Austrian Football Bundesliga side Rheindorf Altach on a 3-year contract. On 3 July 2024, he joined Austria 2. Liga side Schwarz-Weiß Bregenz on a year-long loan. On 20 November 2024, he was recalled to Rheindorf Altach early from his loan. On 11 August 2025, he transferred to the Swiss Challenge League side FC Wil on a 2-year contract.

== International career ==
Kaiba was called up to the Cameroon national team for the 2022 African Nations Championship. On 2 October 2025, it was announced that decided to switch his sporting nationality and play for the Chad national team. He was called up to Chad for a set of 2026 FIFA World Cup qualification matches.

== Honours ==
Coton Sport

- Elite One: 2020–21, 2021–22, 2022–23
