= Bakhit Djibrine =

Chadian footballer (born 1995)

Personal information
- Date of birth: 17 April 1995 (age 31)
- Place of birth: N'Djamena, Chad
- Height: 1.65 m (5 ft 5 in)
- Position: Winger

Team information
- Current team: Foullah Edifice

Senior career*
Years	Team	Apps	(Gls)
2013–2018	Foullah Edifice		
2019	Elect-Sport FC		
2020–	Foullah Edifice		

International career^{‡}
2019–	Chad	11	(0)
- * Club domestic league appearances and goals ‡ National team caps and goals as of 16:18, 24 February 2022 (UTC)

Bakhit Djibrine (Arabic: بخيت جبرين; born 17 April 1995) is a Chadian professional footballer who plays as a winger for Chad Premier League club Foullah Edifice and the Chad national team.

== Honours ==
Foullah Edifice

- Chad Premier League: 2013, 2014, 2019
