= Kounda =

- Location in Burkina Faso
- Coordinates: 12°8′4″N 1°29′37″W
- Country: Burkina Faso
- Region: Centre-Sud Region
- Province: Bazèga Province
- Department: Saponé Department

Population (2019)
  - Total: 2,733

Kounda is a town in the Saponé Department of Bazèga Province in central Burkina Faso.

Population
Year	Pop.	±%
1985	2,081	—
2006	1,930	−7.3%
2019	2,733	+41.6%
