= Hamidou Sinayoko =

Malian footballer

Personal information
- Date of birth: 11 March 1986 (age 40)
- Place of birth: Ségou, Mali
- Height: 1.83 m (6 ft 0 in)
- Position: Forward

Team information
- Current team: Djoliba AC

Youth career
- Bakaridjan de Barouéli

Senior career*
| Years | Team | Apps | (Gls) |
| 2005–2010 | US Bougouni | | |
| 2011–2013 | Onze Créateurs | 21 | (16) |
| 2013–2016 | Djoliba AC | 149 | (69) |
| 2017– | PKNP F.C. | 0 | (0) |

International career
| 2013–2023 | Mali | 14 | (5) |
- * Club domestic league appearances and goals

Hamidou Sinayoko (born 11 March 1986) is a Malian professional footballer who plays as a forward for Djoliba AC.

== Club career ==
Sinayoko was born in Ségou. He started his career with Union Sportive Bougouni in his hometown, before moved 2011 to Onze Créateurs de Niaréla. He played for Onze Createurs until 2013 and signed than for Djoliba AC in summer 2013.

== International career ==
In January 2014, coach Djibril Dramé, invited him to be a part of the Mali squad for the 2014 African Nations Championship. He helped the team to the quarter-finals where they lost to Zimbabwe by two goals to one. He played three games for Mali national football team.

== Career statistics ==
=== International ===
As of match played 24 January 2023

Appearances and goals by national team and year
| National team | Year | Apps | Goals |
|---|---|---|---|
| Mali | 2013 | 1 | 0 |
| Mali | 2014 | 2 | 1 |
| Mali | 2016 | 5 | 1 |
| Mali | 2019 | 1 | 0 |
| Mali | 2021 | 1 | 0 |
| Mali | 2022 | 2 | 2 |
| Mali | 2023 | 2 | 1 |
| Total | | 14 | 5 |

Scores and results list Mali's goal tally first, score column indicates score after each Sinayoko goal.

List of international goals scored by Hamidou Sinayoko
| No. | Date | Venue | Opponent | Score | Result | Competition | Ref. |
|---|---|---|---|---|---|---|---|
| 1 | 25 January 2014 | Cape Town Stadium, Cape Town, South Africa | Zimbabwe | 1–2 | 1–2 | 2014 African Nations Championship | |
| 2 | 19 January 2016 | Umuganda Stadium, Gisenyi, Rwanda | Uganda | 2–2 | 2–2 | 2016 African Nations Championship | |
| 3 | 27 August 2022 | SKD Stadium, Paynesville, Liberia | Sierra Leone | 1–0 | 2–1 | 2022 African Nations Championship qualification | |
| 4 | 3 September 2022 | Stade du 26 Mars, Bamako, Mali | Sierra Leone | 2–0 | 2–0 | 2022 African Nations Championship qualification | |
| 5 | 16 January 2023 | Miloud Hadefi Stadium, Oran, Algeria | Angola | 1–1 | 3–3 | 2022 African Nations Championship | |
