= Tom Ikara =

Ugandan footballer

Personal information
- Full name: Thomas Ikara
- Date of birth: 12 February 1997 (age 29)
- Place of birth: Jinja District
- Position: Goalkeeper

Team information
- Current team: Sidama Coffee S.C.
- Number: 1

Youth career
- BB Soda academy
- Blacksmith football Club

Senior career*
Years	Team	Apps	(Gls)
- Busoga United FC
- KCCA FC
- Mbarara City FC
- Police FC (Uganda)
- Bul FC
- Sidama Coffee S.C.

International career
- Uganda national football team
- * Club domestic league appearances and goals

Tom Ikara (born 12 February 1997) as also known as Tom Ikaara, Thomas Ikara is a Ugandan professional footballer who plays as a goalkeeper for the Uganda Cranes. He played as a goalkeeper for various association football clubs that include: Busoga United FC, KCCA FC, Mbarara City FC, Police FC (Uganda).

== Early life ==
Ikara was born in Jinja Hospital that is located in Jinja district. He completed his secondary school education at Jinja Secondary School.

== Club career ==
Ikara started his football playing career with BB Soda academy. He later joined for Blacksmith football Club.

=== Busoga United FC ===
Ikara played for Busoga United while it was FUFA Big League in the 2016/17.

=== KCCA FC ===
Ikara played for KCCA FC in January 2018 where he won with them leagues that included; the Uganda Premier League in the 2018/19 season, the CECAFA Kagame Cup in 2019. He also played in the CAF Champions League with KCCA FC. Ikara was loaned by KCCA FC to Mbarara City FC for one year in the 2019/20 season under the agreement that Mbarara City will cater for the salary and allowances of Ikara.

=== Mbarara City FC ===
Ikara played for Mbarara City FC in 2019 on loan where he played 21 out of 25 Uganda premier league matches after he was loaned from KCCA FC.

=== Police FC (Uganda) ===
Ikara joined Police FC after he signed a two-year contract as a free agent on the 28 July 2020.

=== BUL FC ===
Ikara joined BUL FC from Police FC in July 2022 after signing with a two-year contract. In 2024, he signed a new two-year contract with BUL FC that will end in 2026.

=== Uganda cranes ===
Ikara has played for Uganda cranes since 2018. He participated in the 2018, 2019 African Nations Championship (CHAN) qualifiers and also the 2021 CHAN finals. He was in the Uganda cranes team that participated in the FIFA 2026 World cup qualifiers and also Morocco AFCON 2025 qualifiers.

== International career ==
In 2024, Ikara joined Sidama Coffee SC from BUL FC after he signed a two-year contract as a free agent.

== Honours ==
1. Golden Glove award winner, 2023/2024 StarTimes Uganda Premier League (SUPL) season while playing for BUL FC.
2. Best goalkeeper award, 2015/16 FUFA Big league season.
3. Most clean sheets award (15), 2023/2024 StarTimes Uganda Premier League (SUPL) season.
4. Goalkeeper of the season nominee, 2023/2024 StarTimes Uganda Premier League.

== See also ==
- Denis Onyango
- Ismail Watenga
- Ali Kimera
