= Barou Sanogo =

Malian footballer

Personal information
- Date of birth: 18 April 1995 (age 31)
- Place of birth: Mali
- Position: Right-back

Team information
- Current team: Djoliba

Senior career*
Years	Team	Apps	(Gls)
2017–2018	Missira		
2018–	Djoliba		

International career^{‡}
2021–	Mali	2	(0)
- * Club domestic league appearances and goals as of 00:11, 26 March 2021 (UTC) ‡ National team caps and goals as of 00:11, 26 March 2021 (UTC)

Barou Sanogo (born 18 April 1995) is a Malian footballer who plays as a right-back for Djoliba and the Mali national team.

== International career ==
Diarra made his professional debut with the Mali national team in a 0–0 (5–4) 2020 African Nations Championship penalty shootout win over Guinea on 3 February 2021.
