= Thomas Chideu =

Zimbabwean footballer (born 1996)

Personal information
- Date of birth: 30 October 1996 (age 30)
- Place of birth: Harare, Zimbabwe
- Height: 1.70 m (5 ft 7 in)
- Position: Forward

Team information
- Current team: Forest Rangers F.C.

Senior career*
| Years | Team | Apps | (Gls) |
| 2014–2015 | Highlanders | | |
| 2015–2017 | Ajax Cape Town | 1 | (0) |
| 2017–2018 | Golden Arrows | 6 | (2) |
| 2018 | Platinum | | |
| 2019–2020 | Bulawayo Chiefs | | |
| 2020-2021 | Harare City | | |
| 2021- | Forest Rangers F.C. | | |

International career
| 2015 | Zimbabwe | 1 | (0) |
- * Club domestic league appearances and goals

Thomas Chideu (born 30 October 1996) is a Zimbabwean football striker who plays for Forest Rangers F.C. He registered his only international cap for Zimbabwe in 2015.
