= Makan Samabaly =

Malian footballer (born 1995)

Personal information
- Date of birth: 11 June 1995 (age 31)
- Place of birth: Bamako, Mali
- Height: 1.80 m (5 ft 11 in)
- Position: Midfielder

Team information
- Current team: Karbala SC

Senior career*
Years	Team	Apps	(Gls)
2013–2017	Real Bamako		
2017–2018	Schiltigheim		
2018–	Real Bamako		

International career
2016–	Mali	14	(1)
- * Club domestic league appearances and goals

Makan Samabaly (born 11 June 1995) is a Malian professional footballer who plays as a midfielder for Karbala SC and the Mali national team.

== International career ==
Diarra made his professional debut with the Mali national team in a 4–0 2020 African Nations Championship qualification win over Guinea Bissau on 27 February 2019.

=== International goals ===
Scores and results list Mali's goal tally first.

No.	Date	Venue	Opponent	Score	Result	Competition
1.	3 September 2022	Stade du 26 Mars, Bamako, Mali	Sierra Leone	1–0	2–0	2022 African Nations Championship qualification
