= Luka Banda =

Zambian footballer (born 1996)

Personal information
- Date of birth: 6 April 1996 (age 30)
- Place of birth: Lusaka, Zambia
- Height: 1.80 m (5 ft 11 in)
- Position: Defender

Team information
- Current team: NAPSA Stars

Senior career*
| Years | Team | Apps | (Gls) |
| 2017– | NAPSA Stars | | |

International career^{‡}
| 2019– | Zambia | 12 | (0) |
- * Club domestic league appearances and goals as of 11 October 2021 ‡ National team caps and goals as of 11 October 2021

Luka Banda (born 6 April 1996) is a Zambian professional footballer who plays as a defender for NAPSA Stars and the Zambia national football team.
