= Allan Chibwe =

Zambian footballer (born 1991)

Personal information
- Date of birth: 22 March 1991 (age 35)
- Place of birth: Mufulira, Zambia
- Height: 1.81 m (5 ft 11 in)
- Position: Goalkeeper

Team information
- Current team: Green Eagles

Senior career*
Years	Team	Apps	(Gls)
2011–2015	Zanaco		
2015–2018	Power Dynamos		
2018–2020	Nkana		
2020–	Green Eagles		

International career^{‡}
2016–	Zambia	14	(0)
- * Club domestic league appearances and goals ‡ National team caps and goals as of 12 March 2021

Allan Chibwe (born 22 March 1991) is a Zambian footballer who plays as a goalkeeper for Green Eagles F.C. and the Zambia national football team.

== Career ==
=== International ===
Chibwe made his senior international debut on 5 November 2016 in a 1-0 friendly defeat to Zimbabwe.

== Career statistics ==
=== International ===
As of matches played 13 January 2021.

National team	Year	Apps	Goals
Zambia	2016	1	0
Zambia	2017	5	0
Zambia	2019	3	0
Zambia	2020	1	0
Zambia	2021	4	0
Total		14	0
