= Lucas Kikoti =

Tanzanian footballer

Personal information
- Date of birth: 15 January 1995 (age 31)
- Position: Attacking midfielder

Team information
- Current team: Namungo

Senior career*
Years	Team	Apps	(Gls)
2015–2018	Maji Maji		
2018–	Namungo		

International career^{‡}
2019–	Tanzania	1	(0)
- * Club domestic league appearances and goals as of 1 August 2020 ‡ National team caps and goals as of 1 August 2020

Lucas Kikoti (born 15 January 1995) is a Tanzanian football attacking midfielder who plays for Namungo.
