= Ousmane Kamissoko =

Malian footballer (born 1998)

Personal information
- Date of birth: 28 August 1998 (age 28)
- Place of birth: Mali
- Position: Forward

Team information
- Current team: Guidars

Senior career*
Years	Team	Apps	(Gls)
2020–2022	Guidars		
2022–2024	Stade Malien		
2024–2026	TP Mazembe	14	(2)

International career^{‡}
2021–	Mali	3	(1)
- * Club domestic league appearances and goals as of 00:11, 26 March 2021 (UTC) ‡ National team caps and goals as of 00:11, 26 March 2023 (UTC)

Ousmane Kamissoko (born 28 August 1998) is a Malian footballer who plays as a forward for the Mali national team.

== Club career ==
Kamissoko joined Stade Malien on 1 July 2022 and then signed for TP Mazembe 1 July 2024 playing 14 competitive games with 8 start and 590 minutes played across 2 seasons all in Linafoot scoring 3 goals (2 against CS Don Bosco on 19 November and on vs Blessing FC 4 days later). On 25 June 2026 the club announced that he was leaving the club as his contract expires.

== International career ==
Kamissoko made his professional debut with the Mali national team 2020 African Nations Championship Final, a 2–0 loss to Morocco on 7 February 2021.

=== International goals ===
Scores and results list Mali's goal tally first.

No.	Date	Venue	Opponent	Score	Result	Competition
1.	27 August 2022	SKD Stadium, Monrovia, Liberia	Sierra Leone	2–0	2–1	2022 African Nations Championship qualification
