= Franck Ondoa =

Cameroonian footballer

Personal information
- Full name: Franck Ondoa Edima
- Date of birth: 3 November 2004 (age 22)
- Height: 1.76 m (5 ft 9 in)
- Position: Striker

Team information
- Current team: Saint-Priest
- Number: 13

Senior career*
Years	Team	Apps	(Gls)
- AcInFoot
2023–2024	Villefranche	5	(0)
2024–	Saint-Priest	9	(0)

International career^{‡}
2021–	Cameroon	1	(0)
- * Club domestic league appearances and goals as of 23 November 2024 ‡ National team caps and goals as of 23:46, 27 March 2021 (UTC)

Franck Ondoa Edima (born 3 November 2004) is a Cameroonian footballer who plays as a striker for French Championnat National 1 club Saint-Priest and the Cameroon national team.
