= Vincent Mashami =

Rwandan football coach

Personal information
- Full name: Vincent Mashami
- Place of birth: Rwanda

Managerial career
- Years: Team
- APR
- 2018–2022: Rwanda

Vincent Mashami is a Rwandan football coach who was appointed manager of the Rwandan national team in August 2018. He has previously coached the national team at youth level, and also club side APR.
