= Bilal Moussa =

Togolese footballer

Personal information
- Date of birth: 29 November 1996 (age 29)
- Place of birth: Togo
- Height: 1.75 m (5 ft 9 in)
- Position: Left-back

Team information
- Current team: AC Barracuda

Senior career*
Years	Team	Apps	(Gls)
2014–2018	Génération Foot		
2018–2019	AS Dakar Sacré-Coeur		
2019–	AC Barracuda		

International career^{‡}
2021–	Togo	4	(0)
- * Club domestic league appearances and goals as of 22:37, 1 September 2021 (UTC) ‡ National team caps and goals as of 22:37, 1 September 2021 (UTC)

Bilal Moussa (born 29 November 1996) is a Togolese footballer who plays as a left-back for AS Togo-Port and the Togo national team.

== International career ==
Moussa made his debut with the Togo national team in a 2–1 2020 African Nations Championship win over Uganda on 22 January 2021.
