= Prince Nxumalo =

South African footballer (born 1990)

Personal information
- Full name: Mfanafuthi Prince Nxumalo
- Date of birth: 18 May 1990 (age 36)
- Place of birth: Durban, South Africa
- Height: 1.83 m (6 ft 0 in)
- Position: Forward

Team information
- Current team: University of Pretoria F.C.

Youth career
- Khanya FC
- Benfica
- Amaqhawe Football Academy

Senior career*
| Years | Team | Apps | (Gls) |
| 2010–2012 | Cape Town | | |
| 2012–2015 | SuperSport United | 17 | (1) |
| 2014 | → Cape Town (loan) | 14 | (7) |
| 2015 | → Golden Arrows (loan) | 14 | (4) |
| 2015–2019 | Ajax Cape Town | 76 | (24) |
| 2019 | Bidvest Wits | 0 | (0) |
| 2019–2020 | Baroka | 9 | (1) |
| 2020–2023 | Sekhukhune United | 46 | (7) |
| 2023–2025 | JDR Stars | 37 | (16) |
| 2025- | University of Pretoria F.C. | 15 | (5) |
- * Club domestic league appearances and goals as of 1 April 2026

Mfanafuthi Prince Nxumalo (born 18 May 1990) is a South African professional soccer player who plays for University of Pretoria F.C. as a forward.

== Club career ==
Nxumalo joined SuperSport United from FC Cape Town in August 2012. He made his league debut against Ajax Cape Town on 19 December 2012, scoring a goal. Prince Nxumalo has since moved to Lamontville Golden Arrows on loan in January 2015.
