= Damien Balisson =

Mauritian international footballer

Personal information
- Full name: Pascal Damien Balisson
- Date of birth: 28 October 1996 (age 29)
- Place of birth: Port Louis, Mauritius
- Height: 1.68 m (5 ft 6 in)
- Position: Left back

Team information
- Current team: Cercle de Joachim

Senior career*
Years	Team	Apps	(Gls)
2014–2018	Cercle de Joachim		
2018	La Tamponnaise		
2018–2019	Cercle de Joachim		
2019–2020	Thonon Évian		
2020–	Cercle de Joachim		

International career^{‡}
2015–	Mauritius	27	(1)
- * Club domestic league appearances and goals as of 13:58, 14 July 2020 (UTC) ‡ National team caps and goals as of 13:58, 14 July 2020 (UTC)

Pascal Damien Balisson (born 28 October 1996) is a Mauritian international footballer who plays for Cercle de Joachim as a left back.

== Club career ==
Born in Port Louis, he has played club football for Cercle de Joachim, La Tamponnaise and Thonon Évian. In the summer 2019, Damien joined French club Thonon Évian. He returned to Cercle de Joachim later that season.

== International career ==
He made his international debut for Mauritius in 2015.

=== International goals ===
Scores and results list Mauritius' goal tally first.

No	Date	Venue	Opponent	Score	Result	Competition
1.	28 May 2018	Old Peter Mokaba Stadium, Polokwane, South Africa	Malawi	1–0	1–0	2018 COSAFA Cup
