= Samou Sidibé =

Malian footballer

Personal information
- Date of birth: 15 May 1995 (age 31)
- Place of birth: Mali
- Position: Left-back

Team information
- Current team: Stade Malien

Senior career*
| Years | Team | Apps | (Gls) |
| 2014–2017 | Bamako | | |
| 2017–2018 | Djoliba | | |
| 2018– | Stade Malien | | |

International career^{‡}
| 2016– | Mali | 2 | (0) |
- * Club domestic league appearances and goals as of 00:11, 26 March 2021 (UTC) ‡ National team caps and goals as of 00:11, 13 March 2022 (UTC)

Samou Sidibé (born 15 May 1995) is a Malian footballer who plays as a left-back for Stade Malien and the Mali national team.

== International career ==
Diarra made his professional debut with the Mali national team in a 0–0 2020 African Nations Championship qualification tie with Mauritania on 21 September 2019.
