= Simbarashe Chinani =

Zimbabwean footballer (born 1995)

Personal information
- Date of birth: 16 September 1995 (age 31)
- Place of birth: Harare, Zimbabwe
- Position: Goalkeeper

Team information
- Current team: Dynamos

Senior career*
Years	Team	Apps	(Gls)
2015	Chegutu Pirates		
2016–2017	Yadah Stars		
2018–	Dynamos		

International career^{‡}
2019–	Zimbabwe	2	(0)
- * Club domestic league appearances and goals as of 15 November 2020 ‡ National team caps and goals as of 15 November 2020

Simbarashe Chinani (born 16 September 1995) is a Zimbabwean football goalkeeper who currently plays for Dynamos.
