= Moumouni Compaoré =

Burkinabé footballer

Personal information
- Date of birth: 20 November 1996 (age 29)
- Place of birth: Bobo-Dioulasso, Burkina Faso
- Height: 1.77 m (5 ft 10 in)
- Position: Defender

Team information
- Current team: USFA

Senior career*
Years	Team	Apps	(Gls)
2013–2015	AS SONABEL		
2015–2018	RC Kadiogo		
2018–	USFA		

International career^{‡}
2015–	Burkina Faso	4	(0)
- * Club domestic league appearances and goals as of 16:01, 6 June 2021 (UTC) ‡ National team caps and goals as of 16:01, 6 June 2021 (UTC)

Moumouni Compaoré (born 20 November 1996) is a Burkinabé football defender who plays for USFA. He was a squad member for the 2020 African Nations Championship.
