= Leonard Mulenga =

Zambian footballer (born 1997)

Personal information
- Date of birth: 26 November 1997 (age 28)
- Place of birth: Lusaka, Zambia
- Position: Defensive midfielder

Team information
- Current team: Green Buffaloes

Senior career*
Years	Team	Apps	(Gls)
2016	Riflemen		
2017–	Green Buffaloes		

International career^{‡}
2020–	Zambia	3	(0)
- * Club domestic league appearances and goals as of 18:14, 15 February 2021 (UTC) ‡ National team caps and goals as of 18:14, 15 February 2021 (UTC)

Leonard Mulenga (born 26 November 1997) is a Zambian footballer who plays as a defensive midfielder for Green Buffaloes and the Zambia national football team.
