= Zakaria Chilongoshi =

Zambian footballer (born 1999)

Personal information
- Date of birth: 27 October 1999 (age 27)
- Place of birth: Lusaka, Zambia
- Height: 1.74 m (5 ft 9 in)
- Position: Left back

Team information
- Current team: Power Dynamos

Senior career*
Years	Team	Apps	(Gls)
2017	Prison Leopards		
2018–2020	Kabwe Warriors		
2020–	Power Dynamos		

International career^{‡}
2019–	Zambia	13	(0)
- * Club domestic league appearances and goals as of 21:04, 25 April 2021 (UTC) ‡ National team caps and goals as of 21:04, 25 April 2021 (UTC)

Zakaria Chilongoshi (born 27 October 1999) is a Zambian footballer who plays as a left back for Power Dynamos and the Zambia national football team.

== Career ==
Chilongoshi was born in Lusaka.

After playing for Prison Leopards and Kabwe Warriors, Chilongoshi signed for Power Dynamos on a three-year contract with the option of a year-long extension in September 2020.
