= Abdoul Garba =

Nigerien footballer

Personal information
- Full name: Abdoul Nasser Adamou Garba
- Date of birth: 23 December 1991 (age 34)
- Place of birth: Niamey, Niger
- Height: 1.72 m (5 ft 8 in)
- Position: Defender

Team information
- Current team: Douanes

Senior career*
Years	Team	Apps	(Gls)
–2017	Douanes		
2017–2019	AS FAN		
2019–	Douanes		

International career^{‡}
2017–	Niger	18	(0)
- * Club domestic league appearances and goals as of 26 April 2021 ‡ National team caps and goals as of 8 October 2021

Abdoul Nasser Adamou Garba (born 23 December 1991) is a Nigerien professional footballer who plays as a defender for Douanes. He was a squad member for the 2020 African Nations Championship.
