= Moussa Ballo (footballer, born 1994) =

Ivorian footballer

Personal information
- Full name: Moussa Ballo Finigue
- Date of birth: 15 December 1994 (age 31)
- Place of birth: Ivory Coast
- Position: Defender

Youth career
- Yopougon FC

Senior career*
Years	Team	Apps	(Gls)
2013–2015	Kalighat Milan Sangha		
2015–2016	Manang Marsyangdi Club		
2016–20??	SC Villa		
- Mbeya City F.C.
2017	Zwekapin United FC		
- * Club domestic league appearances and goals

Moussa Ballo Finigue (born 15 December 1994 in Ivory Coast) is an Ivorian professional footballer who was last attached to Zwekapin United of the Myanmar National League.

== Nepal ==
Recruited by Manang Marsyangdi Club of the Nepalese top division in 2015, commingling with two Ivorians, a Malian, and a Cameroonian, Ballo claimed that the main problem he encountered in Nepal was that the teams did not honor the terms of the contract.

Was sent off for getting two yellow cards in the final day of the Nepal National League.
