= Benedict Chepeshi =

Zambian footballer (born 1996)

Personal information
- Date of birth: 10 June 1996 (age 30)
- Place of birth: Ndola, Zambia
- Height: 1.80 m (5 ft 11 in)
- Position: Defender

Team information
- Current team: Red Arrows

Senior career*
| Years | Team | Apps | (Gls) |
| 2015– | Red Arrows | | |

International career^{‡}
| 2020– | Zambia | 25 | (0) |
- * Club domestic league appearances and goals as of 11 October 2021 ‡ National team caps and goals as of 11 October 2021

Benedict Chepeshi (born 10 June 1996) is a Zambian professional footballer who plays as a defender for Red Arrows and the Zambia national football team.
