= Lameck Siame =

Zambian footballer (born 1997)

Personal information
- Date of birth: 9 July 1997 (age 29)
- Place of birth: Lusaka, Zambia
- Height: 1.84 m (6 ft 0 in)
- Position: Goalkeeper

Team information
- Current team: Zanaco

Senior career*
Years	Team	Apps	(Gls)
2017–2019	Real Nakonde		
2019–2021	Kabwe Warriors		
2021–	Zanaco		

International career^{‡}
2020–	Zambia	2	(0)
- * Club domestic league appearances and goals as of 11 October 2021 ‡ National team caps and goals as of 11 October 2021

Lameck Siame (born 9 July 1997) is a Zambian football goalkeeper who plays for Zanaco F.C.
