= Moussa Ballo (footballer, born 1996) =

Malian footballer

Personal information
- Date of birth: 11 January 1996 (age 30)
- Place of birth: Bamako, Mali
- Height: 1.71 m (5 ft 7 in)
- Position: Left-back

Team information
- Current team: Real Bamako

Senior career*
Years	Team	Apps	(Gls)
2013–2017	Real Bamako		
2017–2018	Raja Beni Mellal		
2018–	Real Bamako		

International career^{‡}
2019–	Mali	7	(0)
- * Club domestic league appearances and goals as of 00:11, 26 March 2021 (UTC) ‡ National team caps and goals as of 00:11, 26 March 2021 (UTC)

Moussa Ballo (born 11 January 1996) is a Malian footballer who plays as a left-back for Real Bamako and the Mali national team.

== International career ==
Ballo made his professional debut with the Mali national team in a 2–0 2020 African Nations Championship qualification win over Mauritania on 20 October 2019.
