= AS Ashanti Golden Boys =

Guinean football club

- Full name: Association Sportive Ashanti Golden Boys
- Nickname: Golden Boys
- Ground: Stade Kankou Moussa, Siguiri
- Capacity: 3,000
- Chairman: Ousmane Magassouba
- Manager: Abdoulaye Sylla
- League: Ligue 1 Pro
- 2025–26: 9th
Home colours	Away colours

Association Sportive Ashanti Golden Boys known as AS Ashanti Golden Boys or shortly Ashanti GB is an association football club from Siguiri, Guinea. They are members of the Guinée Championnat National.
