= 2022 African Nations Championship knockout stage =

Football tournament knockout stage

The knockout stage of the 2022 African Nations Championship began on 27 January 2023 with the quarter-finals and ended with the final at the Nelson Mandela Stadium in Algiers on 4 February 2023.

All match times are local, WAT (UTC+1).

== Format ==
Except for the third place play-off, if a match was level at the end of 90 minutes of normal playing time, 30 minutes of extra time were played, with two periods of 15 minutes each. If still tied after extra time, the match was decided by a penalty shoot-out to determine the winner. In the third place play-off, if the scores remained level after 90 minutes the match went directly to a penalty shoot-out without extra time.

== Qualified teams ==
The top two teams from each of groups A, B and C, and the top team from groups D and E qualified for the knockout stage.

Group	Winners	Runners-up
A	Algeria	Mozambique
B	Senegal	Ivory Coast
C	Madagascar	Ghana
D	Mauritania	—N/a
E	Niger	—N/a

== Bracket ==
Quarter-finals
27 January – Algiers
Algeria	1
Ivory Coast	0
28 January – Oran
Niger	2
Ghana	0
27 January – Annaba
Senegal	1
Mauritania	0
28 January – Constantine
Madagascar	3
Mozambique	1

Semi-finals
31 January – Oran
Algeria	5
Niger	0
31 January – Algiers
Senegal	1
Madagascar	0

Final
4 February – Algiers
Algeria	0 (4)
Senegal (p)	0 (5)
Third place play-off
3 February – Oran
Niger	0
Madagascar	1

== Quarter-finals ==
=== Algeria vs Ivory Coast ===
27 January 2023
17:00

Algeria	1–0	Ivory Coast
Mahious 90+6' (pen.)	Report

Nelson Mandela Stadium, Algiers
Attendance: 37,853
Referee: Abdelaziz Bouh (Mauritania)

Algeria	Ivory Coast

Formation: 4–3–3
GK	16	Alexis Guendouz	(red card) 20'
DF	2	Chouaib Keddad		(substituted off) 90+10'
DF	22	Mokhtar Belkhiter
DF	5	Ayoub Abdellaoui (c)
DF	15	Zineddine Belaïd	(yellow card) 68'
MF	21	Youcef Laouafi
MF	14	Houssem Eddine Mrezigue
MF	8	Zakaria Draoui
MF	6	Ahmed Kendouci		(substituted off) 23'
FW	7	Abderrahmane Meziane
FW	18	Aymen Mahious	(yellow card) 90+8'	(substituted off) 90+10'
Substitutions:
GK	1	Farid Chaâl		(substituted on) 23'
MF	4	Akram Djahnit
FW	9	Karim Aribi
FW	10	Féth-Allah Tahar
MF	11	Oussama Chita
FW	12	Mohamed Islam Bakir
FW	17	Aimen Lahmeri
DF	19	Ayoub Ghezala		(substituted on) 90+10'
FW	20	Sofiane Bayazid
MF	27	Mohamed Ait El Hadj
DF	28	Houari Baouche		(substituted on) 90+10'
Coach:
(Algeria) Madjid Bougherra

Formation: 4–2–3–1
GK	1	Charles Ayayi
DF	17	Ande Habib Cirille
DF	12	Souleymane Coulibaly	(yellow card) 43'
DF	21	Abdoul Siahoune
DF	2	Kouassi Attohoula	(red card) 34'
MF	19	Essis Beaudeleire Aka (c)	(yellow card) 90+9'
MF	13	Semelo Gueï
MF	9	Sankara Karamoko
MF	15	Constant Wayou		(substituted off) 38'
MF	22	Salifou Diarrassouba	(yellow card) 27'	(substituted off) 82'
FW	20	Vignon Ouotro		(substituted off) 46'
Substitutions:
FW	7	Mohamed Sylla		(substituted on) 46'
DF	18	Serge Badjo
MF	6	Mohamed Zougrana		(substituted on) 82'
DF	5	Issif Traore
MF	10	Anicet Oura
MF	4	Marc Goua
GK	23	Drissa Bamba
DF	25	Moise Gbai		(substituted on) 38'
MF	14	Aubin Kouamé
MF	11	Abdramane Konaté
MF	3	Alpha Sidibé
MF	8	Pacome Zouzoua
Coach:
(Ivory Coast) Souhalio Haïdara

Man of the Match:
Aymen Mahious (Algeria)

Assistant referees:
Nouha Bangoura (Senegal)
Modibo Samake (Mali)

Fourth official:
Djindo Louis Hougnandande (Benin)

Video assistant referee:
Bamlak Tessema Weyesa (Ethiopia)

Assistant video assistant referee:
Mahmoud Ashor (Egypt)
Mohammed Abdallah Ibrahim (Sudan)

=== Senegal vs Mauritania ===
27 January 2023
20:00

Senegal	1–0	Mauritania
L. Camara 34' (pen.)	Report

19 May 1956 Stadium, Annaba
Referee: Lotfi Bekouassa (Algeria)

Senegal	Mauritania

Man of the Match:
Hemeya Tanjy (Mauritania)

Assistant referees:
Akram Abbes Zerhouni (Algeria)
Sid Ali Brahim El Hamlaoui (Algeria)

Fourth official:
Karim Sabry (Morocco)

Video assistant referee:
Lahlou Benbraham (Algeria)

Assistant video assistant referee:
Peter Waweru Kamaku (Kenya)
? (Zambia)

=== Madagascar vs Mozambique ===
28 January 2023
17:00

Madagascar	3–1	Mozambique
Razafindranaivo 18'; Razafindrakoto 67'; Ravelomanantsoa 86'	Report	Isac 90+4'

Chahid Hamlaoui Stadium, Constantine
Referee: Pierre Ghislain Atcho (Gabon)

Madagascar	Mozambique

Man of the Match:
Aro Hasina Andianarimanana (Madagascar)

Assistant referees:

- Hensley Petrousse (Seychelles)
- Dieudonne Mutuyimana (Rwanda)

Fourth official: Tom Abongile (South Africa)

Video assistant referee:

Assistant video assistant referee:

=== Niger vs Ghana ===
28 January 2023
20:00

Niger	2–0	Ghana
Yiadom 11' (o.g.); Haïnikoye 49'	Report

Miloud Hadefi Stadium, Oran
Referee: Samuel Uwikunda (Rwanda)

Niger	Ghana

Man of the Match:
Boubacar Haïnikoye (Niger)

Assistant referees:

- Ditsoga Boris Marlaise (Gabon)
- Kwasi Brobbey (Ghana)

Fourth official: Alhadi Allaou Mahamat (Chad)

Video assistant referee:

Assistant video assistant referee:

== Semi-finals ==
=== Algeria vs Niger ===
31 January 2023
17:00

Algeria	5–0	Niger
Abdellaoui 15'; Mahious 24', 34'; Katakoré 45' (o.g.); Bayazid 83'	Report

Miloud Hadefi Stadium, Oran
Attendance: 39,000
Referee: Tom Abongile (South Africa)

Algeria	Niger

Formation: 3–4–2–1
GK	1	Farid Chaâl
DF	5	Ayoub Abdellaoui (c)
DF	15	Zineddine Belaïd	(substituted off) 69'
DF	2	Chouaib Keddad
MF	21	Youcef Laouafi	(substituted off) 69'
MF	6	Ahmed Kendouci	(substituted off) 69'
MF	14	Houssem Eddine Mrezigue
MF	22	Mokhtar Belkhiter
FW	7	Abderrahmane Meziane	(substituted off) 84'
FW	18	Aymen Mahious	(substituted off) 69'
FW	8	Zakaria Draoui
Substitutions:
MF	4	Akram Djahnit
MF	11	Oussama Chita
DF	19	Ayoub Ghezala	(substituted on) 69'
DF	24	Saâdi Radouani
GK	23	Chamseddine Rahmani
FW	10	Féth-Allah Tahar	(substituted on) 69'
MF	27	Mohamed Ait El Hadj	(substituted on) 84'
DF	3	Hocine Dehiri
FW	12	Mohamed Islam Bakir
FW	20	Sofiane Bayazid	(substituted on) 69'
FW	9	Karim Aribi
DF	28	Houari Baouche	(substituted on) 69'
Coach:
(Algeria) Madjid Bougherra

Formation: 4–4–2
GK	22	Mahamadou Djibo
DF	5	Abdoul Adamou Garba		(substituted off) 72'
DF	15	Boureima Katakore (c)
DF	3	Ismael Souley	(yellow card) 37'
DF	2	Adamou Djibo
MF	18	Bilyamine Moussa		(substituted off) 38'
MF	23	Kader Aboubacar
MF	20	Faysal Abdoulaye		(substituted off) 38'
MF	9	Abdoul Aziz Ibrahim		(substituted off) 61'
FW	14	Imarana Seyni		(substituted off) 61'
FW	11	Boubacar Haïnikoye
Substitutions:
DF	6	Abdoul Kassali		(substituted on) 72'
FW	10	Mossi Issa Moussa
MF	8	Moussa Kassa Moudou		(substituted on) 38'
MF	13	Mahamadou Ibrahim
GK	1	Yahaya Mainassara Babari
DF	25	Laouali Salaou
MF	21	Ziyad El-Jaouni
MF	24	Marouf Salissou
DF	26	Alhabib Hassane
DF	17	Mohamed Idrissa Karimou		(substituted on) 61'
FW	7	Yacine Wa Massamba		(substituted on) 61'
MF	12	Ousseini Badamassi		(substituted on) 38'
Coach:
(Niger) Harouna Doula Gabde

Man of the Match:
Houssem Eddine Mrezigue (Algeria)

Assistant referees:
Ivanildo Meirelles De O Sanche Lopes (Angola)
Abdul Aziz Bollel Jawo (Gambia)
Fourth official:
Mahmood Ali Ismail (Sudan)
Video assistant referee:

Assistant video assistant referee:

=== Senegal vs Madagascar ===
31 January 2023
20:00

Senegal	1–0	Madagascar
Diallo 5'	Report

Nelson Mandela Stadium, Algiers
Referee: Alhadi Allaou Mahamat (Chad)

Senegal	Madagascar

Man of the Match:
Lamine Camara (Senegal)

Assistant referees:
Rodrigue Menye Mpele (Cameroon)
Eric Ayimavo Ulrich Ayamr (Benin)
Fourth official:
Kalilou Ibrahim Traoré (Ivory Coast)
Video assistant referee:

Assistant video assistant referee:

== Third place match ==
3 February 2023
20:00

Niger	0–1	Madagascar
	Report	Razafindrakoto 90'

Miloud Hadefi Stadium, Oran
Referee: Mohamed Adel (Egypt)

Niger	Madagascar

Formation: 4–4–2
GK	22	Mahamadou Djibo
DF	2	Adamou Djibo
DF	15	Boureima Katakore (c)	(yellow card) 77'
DF	5	Abdoul Adamou Garba		(substituted off) 68'
DF	6	Abdoul Kassali		(substituted off) 55'
MF	24	Marouf Salissou		(substituted off) 68'
MF	13	Mahamadou Ibrahim		(substituted off) 84'
MF	23	Kader Aboubacar
MF	18	Bilyamine Moussa
FW	14	Imarana Seyni		(substituted off) 55'
FW	11	Boubacar Haïnikoye	(yellow card) 82'
Substitutions:
DF	25	Laouali Salaou
FW	10	Mossi Issa Moussa
MF	12	Ousseini Badamassi		(substituted on) 55'
MF	20	Faysal Abdoulaye		(substituted on) 84'
DF	17	Mohamed Idrissa Karimou		(substituted on) 55'
FW	7	Yacine Wa Massamba
FW	4	Ibrahim Oumarou
MF	21	Ziyad El-Jaouni		(substituted on) 68'
DF	26	Alhabib Hassane
MF	8	Moussa Kassa Moudou
GK	1	Yahaya Mainassara Babari
DF	3	Ismael Souley		(substituted on) 68'
Coach:
(Niger) Harouna Doula Gabde

Formation: 4–3–3
GK	16	Zakanirina Rakotoasimbola
DF	18	Nantenaina Randriamanampisoa
DF	22	Andoniaina Andrianavalona (c)	(yellow card) 78'
DF	5	Soloniaina Razafindraibeharimihanta		(substituted off) 46'
DF	2	Soloniaina Avizara
MF	10	Andriamirado Andrianarimanana		(substituted off) 85'
MF	6	Tokifandresena Andriamanjato
MF	21	Solojantovo Rakotoarisoa		(substituted off) 46'
FW	12	Marcio Ravelomanantsoa		(substituted off) 70'
FW	20	Jean Razafindrakoto
FW	13	Tokinantenaina Randriatsiferana		(substituted off) 85'
Substitutions:
FW	11	Onjaniaina Hasinirina		(substituted on) 85'
MF	7	Solomampionona Razafindranaivo
DF	3	Tantely Antoine Randrianiaina
MF	8	Lalaina Rafanomezantsoa		(substituted on) 46'
DF	24	Rado Mbolasoa Andrininosy	(substituted on) 46'	(yellow card) 54'
MF	19	Tendry Manovo Randrianarijaona		(substituted on) 70'
MF	15	Tiavina Rakotoarisoa		(substituted on) 85'
GK	23	Andrianirina Rajomazandry
DF	17	Tantely Rabarijaona
DF	4	Louis Stéphano Randrianisondrotra
FW	9	Arimalala Rakotobe
DF	1	Andoniaina Rakotondrazaka
Coach:
(Madagascar) Romuald Rakotondrabe

Man of the Match:
Andriamirado Aro Hasina (Madagascar)

Assistant referees:
Kwasi Brobbey (Ghana)
Dos Reis Abelmiro Montenegro (São Tomé and Príncipe)
Fourth official:
Mehrez Melki (Tunisia)
Video assistant referee:

Assistant video assistant referee:

== Final ==
4 February 2023
20:30

Algeria	0–0 (a.e.t.)	Senegal
	Report
Penalties
Djahnit (penalty scored); Draoui (penalty scored); Bayazid (penalty scored); Laouafi (penalty scored); Mahious (penalty missed); Kendouci (penalty missed)	4–5	(penalty scored) Baldé; (penalty scored) M. N'Diaye; (penalty scored) M. Kanté; (penalty missed) C. Ndiaye; (penalty scored) L. Camara; (penalty scored) O. Diouf

Nelson Mandela Stadium, Algiers
Attendance: 39,120
Referee: Pierre Ghislain Atcho (Gabon)

Algeria	Senegal

Formation: 4–3–3
GK	16	Alexis Guendouz
DF	22	Mokhtar Belkhiter
DF	5	Ayoub Abdellaoui (c)
DF	2	Chouaib Keddad
DF	15	Zineddine Belaïd
MF	8	Zakaria Draoui
MF	12	Mohamed Islam Bakir		(substituted off) 68'
MF	14	Houssem Eddine Mrezigue	(yellow card) 111'	(substituted off) 120+2'
FW	21	Youcef Laouafi
FW	7	Abderrahmane Meziane	(yellow card) 23'	(substituted off) 114'
FW	18	Aymen Mahious	(yellow card) 108'
Substitutions:
GK	1	Farid Chaâl
MF	11	Oussama Chita
FW	10	Féth-Allah Tahar
DF	3	Hocine Dehiri
MF	4	Akram Djahnit		(substituted on) 120+2'
MF	27	Mohamed Ait El Hadj
DF	24	Saâdi Radouani
FW	20	Sofiane Bayazid		(substituted on) 114'
MF	6	Ahmed Kendouci	(yellow card) 75'	(substituted on) 68'
FW	9	Karim Aribi
DF	19	Ayoub Ghezala
DF	28	Houari Baouche
Coach:
(Algeria) Madjid Bougherra

Formation: 4–3–3
GK	23	Pape Sy
DF	4	Mamadou Sané	(yellow card) 31'
DF	3	Ousmane Diouf
DF	22	Cheikhou Ndiaye (c)
DF	12	Cheikh Sidibé	(yellow card) 15'
MF	14	Moussa Ndiaye
MF	6	Ousmane Kané
MF	5	Lamine Camara	(yellow card) 23'
FW	11	Malick Mbaye		(substituted off) 113'
FW	17	Serigne Koïté		(substituted off) 83'
FW	10	Pape Diallo		(substituted off) 113'
Substitutions:
DF	18	El Hadji Baldé		(substituted on) 113'
MF	13	Libasse Ngom	(yellow card) 120'	(substituted on) 83'
GK	16	Alioune Badara Faty
FW	7	Cheikh Diouf
MF	20	Elimane Oumar Cissé
DF	2	Abdoulaye Diedhiou
GK	1	Pape Abdoulaye Dieng
FW	9	Raymond Ndour
MF	21	Moussa Kanté		(substituted on) 113'
DF	15	Melo Ndiaye
DF	8	Moussa Sogue
MF	19	Djibril Diarra
Coach:
(Senegal) Pape Thiaw

Man of the Match:
[[]] ()

Assistant referees:
Hensley Petrousse (Seychelles)
Adou Hermann Desire N'Goh (Ivory Coast)
Fourth official:
Mahmood Ali Ismail (Sudan)
Video assistant referee:
Haythem Guirat (Tunisia)
Assistant video assistant referee:
Daniel Laryea (Ghana)
Mohammed Abdallah Ibrahim (Sudan)

Match rules

- 90 minutes.
- 30 minutes of extra time if necessary.
- Penalty shoot-out if scores still level.
- Maximum of twelve named substitutes.
- Maximum of five substitutions, with a sixth allowed in extra time. (Note: Each team was given only three opportunities to make substitutions, with a fourth opportunity in extra time, excluding substitutions made at half-time, before the start of extra time and at half-time in extra time.)
