= 2022 African Nations Championship Group C =

Football tournament group stage

Group C of the 2022 African Nations Championship, consisting of Morocco, Sudan, Madagascar and Ghana, began on 15 January and will end on 23 January 2023.

== Teams ==
Draw position	Team	Zone	Date of qualification	Appearance at Finals	Last appearance	Previous best performance							
Draw position	Team	Zone	Date of qualification	Appearance at Finals	Last appearance	Previous best performance	C1	Morocco (withdrew)	Northern Zone	26 May 2022	5th	2020	Champions (2018, 2020)
C2	Sudan	Central Eastern Zone	2 September 2022	3rd	2018	Third place (2011, 2018)							
C3	Ghana	Western Zone B	3 September 2022	4th	2014	Runners-up (2009, 2014)							
C4	Madagascar	Southern Zone	2 September 2022	1st	Debut	Debut							

== Standings ==
Pos	Team	Pld	W	D	L	GF	GA	GD	Pts	Qualification
1	Madagascar	3	3	0	0	8	1	+7	9	Knockout stage
2	Ghana	3	2	0	1	7	3	+4	6	Knockout stage
3	Sudan	3	1	0	2	4	6	−2	3	
4	Morocco	3	0	0	3	0	9	−9	0 (Note: Morocco withdrew from the tournament after Algerian authorities denied a direct flight from Morocco. Group C became a three-team group.)	Withdrew

Source: CAF
Rules for classification: Tiebreakers

== Matches ==
=== Morocco vs Sudan ===
15 January 2023
17:00

Morocco	(0–3) Cancelled	Sudan
	Report

Chahid Hamlaoui Stadium, Constantine

=== Madagascar vs Ghana ===
15 January 2023
20:00

Madagascar	2–1	Ghana
Razafindranaivo 10'; Randriatsiferana 62'	Report	Agyapong 68'

Chahid Hamlaoui Stadium, Constantine
Referee: Mutaz Ibrahim (Libya)

Madagascar	Ghana

Formation: 4–3–3
GK	16	Zakanirina Rakotoasimbola
DF	3	Tantely Antoine Randrianiaina (c)
DF	5	Soloniaina Razafindraibeharimihanta	(yellow card) 63'
DF	14	Jean Martin Rakotonirina
DF	17	Tantely Rabarijaona
MF	10	Andriamirado Andrianarimanana		(substituted off) 74'
MF	6	Tokifandresena Andriamanjato
FW	20	Jean Razafindrakoto		(substituted off) 54'
FW	7	Solomampionona Razafindranaivo		(substituted off) 75'
MF	8	Lalaina Rafanomezantsoa
FW	13	Tokinantenaina Randriatsiferana		(substituted off) 87'
Substitutions:
GK	22	Andoniaina Andrianavalona		(substituted on) 74'
MF	21	Solojantovo Rakotoarisoa
DF	2	Soloniaina Avizara
MF	18	Nantenaina Randriamanampisoa
DF	4	Louis Stéphano Randrianisondrotra
GK	23	Andrianirina Rajomazandry
MF	15	Pierre Michael Rakotoarisoa		(substituted on) 87'
DF	24	Rado Mbolasoa Andrininosy
FW	11	Onjaniaina Hasinirina		(substituted on) 54'
MF	19	Tendry Manovo Randrianarijaona		(substituted on) 75'
DF	1	Andoniaina Rakotondrazaka
FW	9	Arimalala Rakotobe
Coach:
(Madagascar) Romuald Rakotondrabe

Formation: 4–3–3
GK	16	Ibrahim Danlad
DF	2	Augustine Randolf		(substituted off) 63'
DF	4	Solomon Adomako
DF	5	Konadu Yiadom	(yellow card) 45+2'
DF	9	Denis Korsah Akoumah
MF	8	David Abagna
MF	21	Razak Kasim		(substituted off) 52'
MF	13	Dominic Nsobila	(yellow card) 9'
FW	19	Abdul Yusif		(substituted off) 83'
MF	11	Gladson Awako (c)		(substituted off) 52'
FW	18	Daniel Barnieh
Substitutions:
MF	7	Sylvester Simba		(substituted on) 52'
FW	23	Kofi Korzdi
MF	10	Jonah Attuquaye
FW	17	Augustine Boakye
DF	12	Augustine Agyapong		(substituted on) 63'
DF	14	Sherif Mohammed
FW	6	Kwame Otu		(substituted on) 83'
MF	24	Seidu Suraj		(substituted on) 52'
DF	15	Henry Ansu
GK	22	William Essu
GK	1	Stephen Kwaku
DF	3	Benjamin Abaidoo
Coach:
(Ghana) Annor Walker

Man of the Match:
Tokinantenaina Randriatsiferana (Madagascar)

Assistant referees:
Abdul Aziz Bollel Jawo (Gambia)
Modibo Samake (Mali)
Fourth official:
Mohamed Adel (Egypt)

=== Morocco vs Madagascar ===
19 January 2023
17:00

Morocco	(0–3) Cancelled	Madagascar
	Report

Chahid Hamlaoui Stadium, Constantine

=== Ghana vs Sudan ===
19 January 2023
20:00

Ghana	3–1	Sudan
Yiadom 45+3'; Afriyie 65' (pen.); Suraj 90+8'	Report	Nouh 31'

Chahid Hamlaoui Stadium, Constantine
Referee: Alhadi Allaou Mahamat (Chad)

Ghana	Sudan

Formation: 4–3–3
GK	16	Ibrahim Danlad
DF	9	Denis Korsah Akoumah	(yellow card) 90+4'
DF	5	Konadu Yiadom
DF	4	Solomon Adomako
DF	12	Augustine Agyapong
MF	7	Sylvester Simba		(substituted off) 84'
MF	13	Dominic Nsobila
MF	8	David Abagna
FW	18	Daniel Barnieh (c)	(red card) 90+7'
FW	23	Kofi Korzdi		(substituted off) 83'
MF	10	Jonah Attuquaye	(yellow card) 84'
Substitutions:
DF	2	Augustine Randolf
FW	6	Kwame Otu		(substituted on) 83'
GK	1	Stephen Kwaku
MF	21	Razak Kasim
FW	17	Augustine Boakye
MF	24	Seidu Suraj		(substituted on) 84'
DF	20	Maxwell Arthur
DF	3	Benjamin Abaidoo
DF	14	Sherif Mohammed
GK	22	William Essu
DF	25	Kojo Addai
DF	15	Henry Ansu
Coach:
(Ghana) Annor Walker

Formation: 4–4–2
GK	1	Ali Abdullah Abou
DF	2	Ahmad Adam
DF	19	Salaheldin Nemer (c)
DF	5	Hamza Dawood
DF	20	Mowafaq Sedig	(yellow card) 86'
MF	17	Salaheldin Alhassan
MF	8	Abdelrazig Omer		(substituted off) 79'
FW	6	Al-Gozoli Nooh
MF	27	Ammar Taifour		(substituted off) 74'
MF	22	Walieldin Khidir
FW	10	Mohamed Abdel Raman
Substitutions:
DF	25	Moaiad Maki
FW	9	Yasir Mozamil		(substituted on) 74'
DF	23	Mazin Mohamedein
FW	7	Siddig Gahdia
GK	16	Mohamed Mustafa
DF	13	Awad Zayed
FW	11	Waleed Hamid		(substituted on) 79'
DF	3	Elsadig Hassan
DF	4	Amjed Ismael
MF	18	Elfatih Gadalla
MF	26	Ayman Yagoub
MF	15	Elsamani Saadeldin
Coach:
(Sudan) Burhan Tia

Man of the Match:
David Abagna (Ghana)

Assistant referees:
Akram Abbes Zerhouni (Algeria)
Sid Ali Brahim El Hamlaoui (Algeria)
Fourth official:
Celso Armindo Alvação (Mozambique)

=== Ghana vs Morocco ===
23 January 2023
20:00

Ghana	(3–0) Cancelled	Morocco
	Report

Chahid Hamlaoui Stadium, Constantine

=== Sudan vs Madagascar ===
23 January 2023
20:00

Sudan	0–3	Madagascar
	Report	Randriatsiferana 13'; Razafindranaivo 30'; Rafanomezantsoa 33'

Chahid Hamlaoui Stadium, Constantine (Note: The third match day between Sudan and Madagascar, originally scheduled at Miloud Hadefi Stadium in Oran was transferred to Mohamed Hamlaoui Stadium after Morocco withdrew.)
Referee: Kalilou Ibrahim Traoré (Ivory Coast)

Sudan	Madagascar

Formation: 4–3–3
GK	16	Mohamed Mustafa
DF	23	Mazin Mohamedein
DF	19	Salaheldin Nemer (c)
DF	5	Hamza Dawood		(substituted off) 36'
DF	13	Awad Zayed		(substituted off) 36'
MF	8	Abdelrazig Omer
MF	22	Walieldin Khidir
MF	27	Ammar Taifour
FW	6	Al-Gozoli Nooh		(substituted off) 46'
FW	10	Mohamed Abdel Raman
FW	20	Mowafaq Sedig	(yellow card) 43'
Substitutions:
DF	3	Elsadig Hassan		(substituted on) 36'
MF	18	Elfatih Gadalla
DF	4	Amjed Ismael
DF	2	Ahmad Adam
FW	9	Yasir Mozamil		(substituted on) 36'
FW	11	Waleed Hamid		(substituted on) 46'
DF	25	Moaiad Maki
GK	21	Mohamed Hegleg
GK	1	Ali Abdullah Abou
FW	7	Siddig Gahdia
MF	15	Elsamani Saadeldin
MF	26	Ayman Yagoub
Coach:
(Sudan) Burhan Tia

Formation: 4–2–3–1
GK	16	Zakanirina Rakotoasimbola
DF	3	Tantely Antoine Randrianiaina (c)
DF	5	Soloniaina Razafindraibeharimihanta
DF	14	Martin Rakotonirina	(substituted off) 46'
DF	17	Tantely Rabarijaona	(substituted off) 63'
MF	6	Tokifandresena Andriamanjato
MF	10	Andriamirado Andrianarimanana	(substituted off) 63'
MF	7	Solomampionona Razafindranaivo
MF	8	Lalaina Rafanomezantsoa	(substituted off) 76'
MF	13	Tokinantenaina Randriatsiferana	(substituted off) 82'
FW	20	Jean Razafindrakoto
Substitutions:
MF	18	Nantenaina Randriamanampisoa
GK	22	Andoniaina Andrianavalona	(substituted on) 46'
DF	2	Soloniaina Avizara	(substituted on) 63'
DF	24	Rado Mbolasoa Andrininosy
FW	12	Marcio Ravelomanantsoa	(substituted on) 82'
MF	21	Solojantovo Rakotoarisoa	(substituted on) 76'
FW	9	Arimalala Rakotobe
MF	19	Tendry Manovo Randrianarijaona
DF	4	Louis Stéphano Randrianisondrotra
DF	1	Andoniaina Rakotondrazaka
MF	15	Tiavina Rakotoarisoa	(substituted on) 63'
GK	23	Andrianirina Rajomazandry
Coach:
(Madagascar) Romuald Rakotondrabe

Man of the Match:
Solomampionona Koloina (Madagascar)

Assistant referees:
Adou Hermann Desiré N'goh (Ivory Coast)
Nouha Bangoura (Senegal)
Fourth official:
Pierre Ghislain Atcho (Gabon)

== Discipline ==
Fair play points would have been used as tiebreakers if the overall and head-to-head records of teams were tied. These were calculated based on yellow and red cards received in all group matches as follows:

- first yellow card: −1 point;
- indirect red card (second yellow card): −3 points;
- direct red card: −4 points;
- yellow card and direct red card: −5 points;

Only one of the above deductions was applied to a player in a single match.

Team	Match 1				Match 2				Points
Team	Booked	(yellow card) (yellow-red card)	Sent off (straight red)	(yellow card) (red card)	Booked	(yellow card) (yellow-red card)	Sent off (straight red)	(yellow card) (red card)	Points
Sudan	1				1				–2
Madagascar	1								–1
Ghana	3				2		1		–9
