= 2022 African Nations Championship =

7th edition of CHAN

بطولة أمم إفريقيا للمحليين 2022 Championnat d'Afrique des nations de football 2022

Tournament details
- Host country: Algeria
- Dates: 13 January – 4 February 2023
- Teams: 18 (from 1 confederation)
- Venues: 4 (in 4 host cities)

Final positions
- Champions: Senegal (1st title)
- Runners-up: Algeria
- Third place: Madagascar
- Fourth place: Niger

Tournament statistics
- Matches played: 29
- Goals scored: 55 (1.9 per match)
- Top scorers: (Algeria) Aymen Mahious; (5 goals)
- Best player: (Algeria) Houssem Eddine Mrezigue
- Best goalkeeper: (Senegal) Pape Sy
- Fair play award: Senegal

The 2022 African Nations Championship (Arabic: بطولة أمم إفريقيا للمحليين 2022), known as the 2022 CHAN for short and the TotalEnergies African Nations Championship for sponsorship purposes, was the 7th edition of the biennial association football tournament organized by the Confederation of African Football (CAF), featuring national teams consisting of players currently playing in their respective local leagues. It was held in Algeria from 13 January to 4 February 2023.

Originally scheduled from 10 July to 1 August 2022, CAF rescheduled the tournament to January 2023 following an announcement at an executive committee meeting held on 10 September 2020 via video conferencing, citing the postponement of the 2020 edition to 2021 and the 2021 Africa Cup of Nations to 2022 due to the COVID-19 pandemic in Africa as well as the already-scheduled 2022 FIFA World Cup in November – December 2022.

Eighteen teams were supposed to be contesting in this edition, which would have been an increase of 2 teams from the previous edition in 2020; but defending champions Morocco were unable to defend their title due to political tensions with Algerian authorities which began with Algeria's unilaterally decision in 2021 to close its airspace to Moroccan flights, including and especially its official carrier Royal Air Maroc.

Senegal won their first title, following on from their inaugural Africa Cup of Nations title win a year earlier, 5–4 on penalties against host nation Algeria in the final.

== Host selection ==
Algeria were officially named as hosts of the 2022 edition on 29 September 2018 at an executive committee meeting held at Sharm El Sheikh, Egypt.

== Qualification ==
The qualification procedures were unveiled at the CAF headquarters in Cairo, Egypt on 26 May 2022 with the qualification itself running from 22 July to 4 September 2022.

=== Qualified teams ===
The following teams qualified for the main tournament:

Morocco was originally set to take part in the tournament with their under-23 national team after their local national team was officially disbanded by the FRMF on 31 August 2022. However, the team announced their withdrawal from the tournament on 12 January 2023, after hosts Algeria refused to allow the squad to take a direct flight from Rabat to Constantine via their flag carrier sponsor, Royal Air Maroc.

Team	Zone	Appearance	Previous best performance	FIFA ranking at start of event
Algeria (hosts)	Northern Zone	2nd	Fourth place (2011)	40
~~Morocco~~	Northern Zone	5th	Champions (2018, 2020)	11
Libya	Northern Zone	5th	Champions (2014)	120
Senegal	Western Zone A	3rd	Fourth place (2009)	19
Mauritania	Western Zone A	3rd	Group stage (2014, 2018)	103
Mali	Western Zone A	5th	Runners-up (2016, 2020)	45
Niger	Western Zone B	4th	Quarter-finals (2011)	122
Ghana	Western Zone B	4th	Runners-up (2009, 2014)	58
Ivory Coast	Western Zone B	5th	Third place (2016)	47
DR Congo	Central Zone	6th	Champions (2009, 2016)	73
Congo	Central Zone	4th	Quarter-finals (2018, 2020)	99
Cameroon	Central Zone	5th	Fourth place (2020)	33
Sudan	Central Eastern Zone	3rd	Third place (2011, 2018)	128
Ethiopia	Central Eastern Zone	3rd	Group stage (2014, 2016)	138
Uganda	Central Eastern Zone	6th	Group stage (2011, 2014, 2016, 2018, 2020)	89
Madagascar	Southern Zone	1st	Debut	102
Angola	Southern Zone	4th	Runners-up (2011)	117
Mozambique	Southern Zone	2nd	Group stage (2014)	114

== Mascot ==
Algeria took the fennec fox as a mascot for the championship and named it "COBTAN". And the slogan of the edition was "CHAN fi bled a chène" (CHAN in the country of glory).

== Venues ==
This edition of the tournament was confirmed by the Algerian Football Federation 1 August 2020 to be held in four venues at four cities across host nation Algeria: Algiers, Oran, Constantine and Annaba.

2022 African Nations Championship is located in Algeria	Algiers	Oran
2022 African Nations Championship is located in Algeria	Nelson Mandela Stadium	Miloud Hadefi Stadium
2022 African Nations Championship is located in Algeria	Capacity: 40,784	Capacity: 40,143
2022 African Nations Championship is located in Algeria	Constantine	Annaba
2022 African Nations Championship is located in Algeria	Chahid Hamlaoui Stadium	19 May 1956 Stadium
2022 African Nations Championship is located in Algeria	Capacity: 22,986	Capacity: 58,100

Team base camps

City	Team	Hotel	Training site
Algiers	Algeria (hosts)	CTN Sidi Moussa	CTN Sidi Moussa
Algiers	Libya	Golden Tulip Royaume Alger	ANNEXE - Nelson Mandela Stadium
Algiers	Ethiopia	Hotel Bay Diab	ANNEXE - Nelson Mandela Stadium
Algiers	Mozambique	Mercure Hotel Aéroport	Salem Mabrouki Stadium
Annaba	DR Congo	Complexe Touristique Sabri	ANNEXE - 19 May 1956 Stadium
Annaba	Ivory Coast	Hotel Royal Elisa Annaba	ANNEXE - Colonel Abdelkader Chabou Stadium
Annaba	Senegal	Hôtel Rym El Djamil	ANNEXE - 19 May 1956 Stadium
Annaba	Uganda	Hotel militaire annaba	ANNEXE - Colonel Abdelkader Chabou Stadium
Constantine	~~Morocco~~	Novotel Constantine	ANNEXE - Mohamed Hamlaoui Stadium
Constantine	Sudan	Golden Tulip Hotel Alexandre	ANNEXE - Mohamed Hamlaoui Stadium
Constantine	Madagascar	Golden Tulip Hotel Alexandre	EBRC
Constantine	Ghana	Hotel El Khayem	EBRC
Oran	Mali	Rodina Hotel Oran	Stade des Castors
Oran	Angola	Rodina Hotel Oran	Stade des Castors
Oran	Mauritania	Hotel Oran Bay	ANNEXE 1 - Miloud Hadefi Stadium
Oran	Cameroon	Hotel Vent Dôme Khaled	ANNEXE 1 - Miloud Hadefi Stadium
Oran	Congo	Hotel Oran Bay	ANNEXE 2 - Miloud Hadefi Stadium
Oran	Niger	Pacha Hotel	ANNEXE 2 - Miloud Hadefi Stadium

== Draw ==
The draw for this edition was held at Boualem Bessaiah Opera House in the host nation's capital, Algiers, on 1 October 2022 at 18:00 WET (UTC±0).

The 18 teams were drawn into three groups of four teams and two groups of three. Hosts Algeria were seeded in Group A (A1) and defending champions Morocco were seeded in Group C (C1), with the remaining teams were seeded based on their results the four previous editions of the tournament: 2014 (multiplied by 1), 2016 (by 2), 2018 (by 3) and 2020 (by 4):

- 7 points for winner
- 5 points for runner-up
- 3 points for semi-finalists
- 2 points for quarter-finalists
- 1 point for group stage

Based on the formula above, the four pots were allocated as follows:

Seeded	Pot 1	Pot 2	Pot 3
1. Algeria (hosts) (0 pts) (A1); 2. Morocco (53 pts) (C1)	3. Mali (32 pts); 4. Cameroon (24 pts); 5. DR Congo (20 pts)	6. Congo (19 pts); 7. Libya (15 pts); 8. Uganda (12 pts); 9. Angola (10 pts); 10. Sudan (9 pts)	11. Niger (8 pts); 12. Ivory Coast (6 pts); 13. Mauritania (5 pts); 14. Ethiopia (4 pts); 15. Senegal (3 pts); 16. Ghana (1 pts); 17. Mozambique (0 pts); 18. Madagascar (0 pts)

== Squads ==
Each squad could contain a maximum of 28 players (Regulations Article 72).

== Match officials ==
The following 52 match officials officiated during the 2022 African Nations Championship.

Referees

- (Algeria) Lotfi Bekouassa
- (Mauritius) Patrice Milazare
- (Chad) Alhadi Allaou Mahamat
- (Ivory Coast) Kalilou Ibrahim Traoré
- (Egypt) Mohamed Adel
- (Mauritania) Abdelaziz Bouh
- (Libya) Mutaz Ibrahim
- (Morocco) Karim Sabry
- (Gabon) Pierre Ghislain Atcho
- (Mozambique) Celso Armindo Alvação
- (Rwanda) Samuel Uwikunda
- (Togo) Vincentia Amédomé
- (Sudan) Mahmood Ali Ismail
- (Republic of the Congo) Messie Nkounkou
- (Tunisia) Mehrez Melki
- (Benin) Djindo Louis Hougnandande
- (Senegal) Daouda Gueye
- (South Africa) Abongile Tom
- (Cameroon) Blaise Yuven Ngwa
- (Burundi) Emery Niyongabo

Assistant referees

- (Algeria) Akram Abbes Zerhouni
- (Algeria) Sid Ali Brahim El Hamlaoui
- (Malawi) Clemence Kanduku
- (Benin) Eric Ayimavo Ulrich Ayamr
- (Ghana) Kwasi Brobbey
- (Morocco) Hamedine Diba
- (Ivory Coast) Adou Hermann Desire Ngoh
- (Somalia) Hamza Hagi Abdi
- (Mali) Modibo Samake
- (São Tomé and Príncipe) Dos Reis Abelmiro Montenegro
- (Gabon) Ditsoga Boris Marlaise
- (Cameroon) Rodrigue Menye Mpele
- (Senegal) Nouha Bangoura
- (Burkina Faso) Sanou Habib Judicael
- (Rwanda) Dieudonne Mutuyimana
- (Angola) Ivanildo Meirelles De O Sanche Lopes
- (Seychelles) Hensley Petrousse
- (The Gambia) Abdul Aziz Bollel Jawo

Video assistant referees

- (Tunisia) Haythem Guirat
- (Algeria) Lahlou Benbraham
- (Ghana) Daniel Laryea
- (Egypt) Mahmoud Ashor
- (Morocco) Samir Guezzaz
- (Mauritania) Dahane Beida
- (Senegal) Issa Sy
- (Burundi) Pacifique Ndabihawenimana
- (Ethiopia) Bamlak Tessema Weyesa
- (Kenya) Peter Waweru Kamaku
- (Morocco) Zakaria Brinsi
- (Sudan) Mohammed Abdallah Ibrahim

== Group stage ==
The top two teams of each group of 4 and the top team of each group of 3 advanced to the knockout stages.

=== Group A ===
Pos	Team	Pld	W	D	L	GF	GA	GD	Pts	Qualification
1	Algeria (H)	3	3	0	0	3	0	+3	9	Knockout stage
2	Mozambique	3	1	1	1	3	3	0	4	Knockout stage
3	Libya	3	1	0	2	5	5	0	3	
4	Ethiopia	3	0	1	2	1	4	−3	1	

Source: CAF
(H) Hosts
13 January 2023
20:00

Algeria	1–0	Libya
Mahious 57' (pen.)	Report

Nelson Mandela Stadium, Algiers
Attendance: 41,000
Referee: Tom Abongile (South Africa)
14 January 2023
14:00

Ethiopia	0–0	Mozambique
	Report

Nelson Mandela Stadium, Algiers
Referee: Vincentia Amédomé (Togo)

17 January 2023
17:00

Mozambique	3–2	Libya
Melque 78'; Jone 80'; Lau Há King 85'	Report	Chico 23' (o.g.); Saltou 90+3'

Nelson Mandela Stadium, Algiers
Referee: Samuel Uwikunda (Rwanda)
17 January 2023
20:00

Algeria	1–0	Ethiopia
Mahious 52'	Report

Nelson Mandela Stadium, Algiers
Attendance: 34,987
Referee: Pierre Ghislain Atcho (Gabon)

21 January 2023
20:00

Mozambique	0–1	Algeria
	Report	Dehiri 7'

Nelson Mandela Stadium, Algiers
Attendance: 37,279
Referee: Mahmood Ali Ismail (Sudan)
21 January 2023
20:00

Libya	3–1	Ethiopia
Abu Arqoub 44'; Al-Abbasi 50'; Saltou 78'	Report	Panom 39' (pen.)

19 May 1956 Stadium, Annaba
Referee: Messie Nkounkou (Congo)

=== Group B ===
Pos	Team	Pld	W	D	L	GF	GA	GD	Pts	Qualification
1	Senegal	3	2	0	1	4	1	+3	6	Knockout stage
2	Ivory Coast	3	1	1	1	3	2	+1	4	Knockout stage
3	Uganda	3	1	1	1	2	3	−1	4	
4	DR Congo	3	0	2	1	0	3	−3	2	

Source: CAF
14 January 2023
17:00

DR Congo	0–0	Uganda
	Report

19 May 1956 Stadium, Annaba
Attendance: 16,000
Referee: Patrice Milazare (Mauritius)
14 January 2023
20:00

Ivory Coast	0–1	Senegal
	Report	Ndiaye 80'

19 May 1956 Stadium, Annaba
Attendance: 16,000
Referee: Lotfi Bekouassa (Algeria)

18 January 2023
17:00

DR Congo	0–0	Ivory Coast
	Report

19 May 1956 Stadium, Annaba
Referee: Mohamed Adel (Egypt)
18 January 2023
20:00

Senegal	0–1	Uganda
	Report	Karisa 33'

19 May 1956 Stadium, Annaba
Referee: Mehrez Melki (Tunisia)

22 January 2023
20:00

Senegal	3–0	DR Congo
Diouf 23'; Diallo 74'; Siadi 77' (o.g.)	Report

19 May 1956 Stadium, Annaba
Referee: Tom Abongile (South Africa)
22 January 2023
20:00

Uganda	1–3	Ivory Coast
Waiswa 34' (pen.)	Report	Karamoko 12'; Ouotro 27'; Kouamé 78'

Nelson Mandela Stadium, Algiers
Referee: Blaise Yuven Ngwa (Cameroon)

=== Group C ===
Pos	Team	Pld	W	D	L	GF	GA	GD	Pts	Qualification
1	Madagascar	3	3	0	0	8	1	+7	9	Knockout stage
2	Ghana	3	2	0	1	7	3	+4	6	Knockout stage
3	Sudan	3	1	0	2	4	6	−2	3	
4	Morocco	3	0	0	3	0	9	−9	0 (Note: Morocco withdrew from the tournament after Algerian authorities denied a direct flight from Morocco. Group C became a three-team group.)	Withdrew

Source: CAF
Notes:
15 January 2023
17:00

Morocco	(0–3) Cancelled	Sudan
	Report

Chahid Hamlaoui Stadium, Constantine
15 January 2023
20:00

Madagascar	2–1	Ghana
Razafindranaivo 10'; Randriatsiferana 62'	Report	Agyapong 68'

Chahid Hamlaoui Stadium, Constantine
Referee: Mutaz Ibrahim (Libya)

19 January 2023
17:00

Morocco	(0–3) Cancelled	Madagascar
	Report

Chahid Hamlaoui Stadium, Constantine
19 January 2023
20:00

Ghana	3–1	Sudan
Yiadom 45+3'; Afriyie 65' (pen.); Suraj 90+8'	Report	Nouh 31'

Chahid Hamlaoui Stadium, Constantine
Referee: Alhadi Allaou Mahamat (Chad)

23 January 2023
20:00

Ghana	(3–0) Cancelled	Morocco
	Report

Chahid Hamlaoui Stadium, Constantine
23 January 2023
20:00

Sudan	0–3	Madagascar
	Report	Randriatsiferana 13'; Razafindranaivo 30'; Rafanomezantsoa 33'

Chahid Hamlaoui Stadium, Constantine (Note: The third match day between Sudan and Madagascar, originally scheduled at Miloud Hadefi Stadium in Oran was transferred to Mohamed Hamlaoui Stadium after Morocco withdrew.)
Referee: Kalilou Ibrahim Traoré (Ivory Coast)

=== Group D ===
Pos	Team	Pld	W	D	L	GF	GA	GD	Pts	Qualification
1	Mauritania	2	1	1	0	1	0	+1	4	Knockout stage
2	Angola	2	0	2	0	3	3	0	2	
3	Mali	2	0	1	1	3	4	−1	1	

Source: CAF
16 January 2023
17:00

Mali	3–3	Angola
Sinayoko 23'; Diaby 79'; Coulibaly 83'	Report	Depú 12', 26'; Gilberto 72'

Miloud Hadefi Stadium, Oran
Referee: Karim Sabry (Morocco)

20 January 2023
17:00

Angola	0–0	Mauritania
	Report

Miloud Hadefi Stadium, Oran
Referee: Djindo Louis Hougnandande (Benin)

24 January 2023
17:00

Mauritania	1–0	Mali
Sy 53'	Report

Miloud Hadefi Stadium, Oran
Attendance: 4,389
Referee: Mohamed Adel (Egypt)

=== Group E ===
Pos	Team	Pld	W	D	L	GF	GA	GD	Pts	Qualification
1	Niger	2	1	1	0	1	0	+1	4	Knockout stage
2	Cameroon	2	1	0	1	1	1	0	3	
3	Congo	2	0	1	1	0	1	−1	1	

Source: CAF
16 January 2023
20:00

Cameroon	1–0	Congo
Mbekeli 63'	Report

Miloud Hadefi Stadium, Oran
Referee: Abdelaziz Bouh (Mauritania)

20 January 2023
20:00

Congo	0–0	Niger
	Report

Miloud Hadefi Stadium, Oran
Referee: Daouda Gueye (Senegal)

24 January 2023
20:00

Niger	1–0	Cameroon
Badamassi 69'	Report

Miloud Hadefi Stadium, Oran
Referee: Celso Armindo Alvação (Mozambique)

== Knockout stage ==
In the knockout stage, extra time and a penalty shoot-out were used to decide the winners if necessary.

=== Bracket ===
Quarter-finals
27 January – Algiers
Algeria	1
Ivory Coast	0
28 January – Oran
Niger	2
Ghana	0
27 January – Annaba
Senegal	1
Mauritania	0
28 January – Constantine
Madagascar	3
Mozambique	1

Semi-finals
31 January – Oran
Algeria	5
Niger	0
31 January – Algiers
Senegal	1
Madagascar	0

Final
4 February – Algiers
Algeria	0 (4)
Senegal (p)	0 (5)
Third place play-off
3 February – Oran
Niger	0
Madagascar	1

=== Quarter-finals ===
27 January 2023
17:00

Algeria	1–0	Ivory Coast
Mahious 90+6' (pen.)	Report

Nelson Mandela Stadium, Algiers
Attendance: 37,853
Referee: Abdelaziz Bouh (Mauritania)

27 January 2023
20:00

Senegal	1–0	Mauritania
L. Camara 34' (pen.)	Report

19 May 1956 Stadium, Annaba
Referee: Lotfi Bekouassa (Algeria)

28 January 2023
17:00

Madagascar	3–1	Mozambique
Razafindranaivo 18'; Razafindrakoto 67'; Ravelomanantsoa 86'	Report	Isac 90+4'

Chahid Hamlaoui Stadium, Constantine
Referee: Pierre Ghislain Atcho (Gabon)

28 January 2023
20:00

Niger	2–0	Ghana
Yiadom 11' (o.g.); Haïnikoye 49'	Report

Miloud Hadefi Stadium, Oran
Referee: Samuel Uwikunda (Rwanda)

=== Semi-finals ===
31 January 2023
17:00

Algeria	5–0	Niger
Abdellaoui 15'; Mahious 24', 34'; Katakoré 45' (o.g.); Bayazid 83'	Report

Miloud Hadefi Stadium, Oran
Attendance: 39,000
Referee: Tom Abongile (South Africa)

31 January 2023
20:00

Senegal	1–0	Madagascar
Diallo 5'	Report

Nelson Mandela Stadium, Algiers
Referee: Alhadi Allaou Mahamat (Chad)

=== Third place play-off ===
3 February 2023
20:00

Niger	0–1	Madagascar
	Report	Razafindrakoto 90'

Miloud Hadefi Stadium, Oran
Referee: Mohamed Adel (Egypt)

=== Final ===
4 February 2023
20:30

Algeria	0–0 (a.e.t.)	Senegal
	Report
Penalties
Djahnit (penalty scored); Draoui (penalty scored); Bayazid (penalty scored); Laouafi (penalty scored); Mahious (penalty missed); Kendouci (penalty missed)	4–5	(penalty scored) Baldé; (penalty scored) M. N'Diaye; (penalty scored) M. Kanté; (penalty missed) C. Ndiaye; (penalty scored) L. Camara; (penalty scored) O. Diouf

Nelson Mandela Stadium, Algiers
Attendance: 39,120
Referee: Pierre Ghislain Atcho (Gabon)

== Goalscorers ==
There were 55 goals scored in 29 matches, for an average of 1.9 goals per match.

5 goals

- (Algeria) Aymen Mahious

3 goals

- (Madagascar) Koloina Razafindranaivo

2 goals

- (Angola) Depú
- (Libya) Anis Saltou
- (Madagascar) Tsiry Randriatsiferana
- (Madagascar) Jean-Yves Razafindrakoto
- (Senegal) Pape Diallo

1 goal

- (Algeria) Ayoub Abdellaoui
- (Algeria) Sofiane Bayazid
- (Algeria) Hocine Dehiri
- (Angola) Gilberto
- (Cameroon) Jerome Ngom Mbekeli
- (Ethiopia) Gatoch Panom
- (Ghana) Daniel Afriyie
- (Ghana) Augustine Agyapong
- (Ghana) Seidu Suraj
- (Ghana) Konadu Yiadom
- (Ivory Coast) Sankara Karamoko
- (Ivory Coast) Aubin Kouamé
- (Ivory Coast) Vignon Ouotro
- (Libya) Abdulati Al-Abbasi
- (Libya) Ali Abu Arqoub
- (Madagascar) Lalaina Rafanomezantsoa
- (Madagascar) Marcio Ravelomanantsoa
- (Mali) Ousmane Coulibaly
- (Mali) Yoro Diaby
- (Mali) Hamidou Sinayoko
- (Mauritania) Mamadou Sy
- (Mozambique) Isac de Carvalho
- (Mozambique) Feliciano João Jone
- (Mozambique) Pachoio Lau Há King
- (Mozambique) Melque Melito Alexandre
- (Niger) Ousseini Badamassi
- (Niger) Boubacar Haïnikoye
- (Senegal) Lamine Camara
- (Senegal) Ousmane Diouf
- (Senegal) Moussa Ndiaye
- (Sudan) Al-Gozoli Nooh
- (Uganda) Milton Karisa
- (Uganda) Moses Waiswa

1 own goal

- (Democratic Republic of the Congo) Baggio Siadi (against Senegal)
- (Ghana) Konadu Yiadom (against Niger)
- (Mozambique) Chico (against Libya)
- (Niger) Boureima Katakoré (against Algeria)

== Awards ==
The following awards were given at the conclusion of the tournament:

Total Man of the Competition
(Algeria) Houssem Eddine Mrezigue
Top Scorer
(Algeria) Aymen Mahious
(5 goals)
Best Goalkeeper
(Senegal) Pape Sy
Best Coach
Pape Thiaw (Senegal)
CAF Fair Play Team
Senegal

=== Team of the Tournament ===
Goalkeeper	Defenders	Midfielders	Forwards
(Senegal) Pape Sy	(Senegal) Mamadou Sané; (Algeria) Ayoub Abdellaoui; (Algeria) Chouaïb Keddad; (Senegal) Cheick Sidibé	(Senegal) Lamine Camara; (Algeria) Houssem Mrezigue; (Madagascar) Arohasina Andrianarimanana	(Madagascar) Solomampionona Koloina; (Senegal) Papa Diallo; (Algeria) Aymen Mahious

== Broadcasting rights ==
In Africa:

Regional Broadcasters

Territory	Broadcaster	Ref.
Anglophone and Lusophone Sub-Saharan Africa	SuperSport	
Francophone Sub-Saharan Africa	Canal+Sport Afrique	
North Africa	beIN Sports	

Broadcasters by country

Territory	Broadcaster	Ref.
Algeria	EPTV	
Benin	ORTB	
Burkina Faso	RTB	
Cameroon	CRTV	
Cape Verde	RTC	
Republic of Congo	Télé Congo	
Côte d'Ivoire	RTI	
Ghana	StarTimes; GTV Sports+	
Kenya	StarTimes; K24 TV	
Madagascar	Télévision Malagasy	
Malawi	MBC	
Mali	ORTM	
Mozambique	TVM	
Senegal	RTS	
Tanzania	Azam TV	
Togo	TVT	
Uganda	StarTimes; UBC	
South Africa	SABC	

Rest of the world:

Territory	Broadcaster	Ref.
Australia	beIN Sports	
Canada	beIN Sports	
France	beIN Sports	
Hong Kong	beIN Sports	
Middle East	beIN Sports	
United States	beIN Sports	
