= Congo national football team results (2020–present) =

This article provides details of international football games played by the Congo national football team from 2020 to present.

== Results ==
Key
Win
Draw
Defeat

=== 2020 ===
20 February Friendly	Congo	1–1	Cameroon	Goma, DR Congo
16:00 UTC+2	Mouandzibi 87'	Report	Akono 36'	Stadium: Stade de l'Unité

28 February Friendly	Rwanda	0–0	Congo	Kigali, Rwanda
16:00 UTC+2		Report		Stadium: Amahoro Stadium

9 October Friendly	Congo	0–1	Gambia	Parchal, Portugal
17:00 UTC+1		Report	Ceesay 55'	Stadium: Estádio Municipal Bela Vista; Referee: Nuno Almeida (Portugal)

12 November 2021 AFCON qualification	Congo	2–0	Eswatini	Brazzaville, Congo
17:00 UTC+1	Ibara 77'; Makiesse 81'	Report		Stadium: Stade Alphonse Massemba-Débat; Referee: Joseph Odey Ogabor (Nigeria)

15 November 2021 AFCON qualification	Eswatini	0–0	Congo	Manzini, Eswatini
15:00 UTC+2		Report		Stadium: Mavuso Sports Centre; Referee: Hassan Mohamed Hagi (Somalia)

=== 2021 ===
7 January Friendly	Rwanda	2–2	Congo	Kigali, Rwanda
17:00 UTC+2	Mico 29'; Twizerimana 87'	Report	Obassi 9', 27'	Stadium: Amahoro Stadium

10 January Friendly	Rwanda	0–1	Congo	Kigali, Rwanda
17:00 UTC+2		Report	Ikouma 10'	Stadium: Amahoro Stadium

17 January 2020 CHAN	DR Congo	1–0	Congo	Douala, Cameroon
20:00 UTC+1	Kubanza 47'	Report		Stadium: Japoma Stadium; Referee: Samir Guezzaz (Morocco)

21 January 2020 CHAN	Congo	1–1	Niger	Douala, Cameroon
20:00 UTC+1	Mouandza 35'	Report	Moussa 70' (pen.)	Stadium: Japoma Stadium; Referee: Peter Waweru (Kenya)

25 January 2020 CHAN	Congo	1–0	Libya	Douala, Cameroon
20:00 UTC+1	Ngouenimba 50'	Report		Stadium: Japoma Stadium; Referee: Sidi Alioum (Cameroon)

30 January 2020 CHAN	Mali	0–0 (a.e.t.) (5–4 p)	Congo	Yaoundé, Cameroon
17:00 UTC+1		Report		Stadium: Stade Ahmadou Ahidjo; Referee: Peter Waweru Kamaku (Kenya)
	Penalties
	Samake (penalty scored); Kyabou (penalty scored); Samabali (penalty scored); Doumba (penalty scored); Coulibaly (penalty scored)		(penalty missed) Mapata; (penalty scored) Ondongo; (penalty scored) Binguila; (penalty scored) Mokombo; (penalty scored) Ndzila

26 March 2021 AFCON qualification	Congo	0–0	Senegal	Brazzaville, Congo
17:00 UTC+1		Report		Stadium: Stade Alphonse Massemba-Débat; Referee: Mahmoud El Banna (Egypt)

30 March 2021 AFCON qualification	Guinea-Bissau	3–0	Congo	Bissau, Guinea-Bissau
16:00 UTC+0	Piqueti 45+1'; Mendy 73'; Jorginho 80'	Report		Stadium: Estádio 24 de Setembro; Referee: Kouassi Attiogbe (Togo)

9 June Friendly	Niger	0–1	Congo	Manavgat, Turkey
19:00 UTC+1		Report	Mbenza 32'	Stadium: Arslan Zeki Demirci Sports Complex

2 September 2022 World Cup qualification	Namibia	1–1	Congo	Johannesburg, South Africa
18:00 UTC+2	Hambira 24'	Report	Hambira 57' (o.g.)	Stadium: Orlando Stadium; Attendance: 0 Referee: Andofetra Rakotojaona (Madagascar)

7 September 2022 World Cup qualification	Congo	1–3	Senegal	Brazzaville, Congo
17:00 UTC+1	Ganvoula 45+2' (pen.)	Report	Dia 27'; Sarr 82'; Mané 87' (pen.)	Stadium: Stade Alphonse Massamba-Débat; Attendance: 0 Referee: Mohamed Ali Moussa (Niger)

9 October 2022 World Cup qualification	Togo	1–1	Congo	Lomé, Togo
16:00 UTC+0	Placca Fessou 56'	Report	Romao 21' (o.g.)	Stadium: Stade de Kégué; Referee: Sekou Ahmed Touré (Guinea)

12 October 2022 World Cup qualification	Congo	1–2	Togo	Brazzaville, Congo
17:00 UTC+1	Mbenza 71'	Report	Placca Fessou 43'; Denkey 77'	Stadium: Stade Alphonse Massemba-Débat; Attendance: 0 Referee: Djindo Louis Houngnandande (Benin)

11 November 2022 World Cup qualification	Congo	1–1	Namibia	Brazzaville, Congo
17:00 UTC+1	Mbenza 54'	Report	Shalulile 42'	Stadium: Stade Alphonse Massemba-Débat; Attendance: 0 Referee: Samuel Uwikunda (Rwanda)

14 November 2022 World Cup qualification	Senegal	2–0	Congo	Thiès, Senegal
21:00 UTC+0	Sarr 14', 24'	Report		Stadium: Stade Lat-Dior; Attendance: 5,000; Referee: Fabricio Duarte (Cape Verde)

=== 2022 ===
25 March Friendly	Zambia	3–1	Congo	Antalya, Turkey
16:00 UTC+3	Mwepu 20' (pen.); Kangwa 24'; Musonda 63'	Report	Mbenza 34' (pen.)	Stadium: Mardan Sports Complex

29 March Friendly	Congo	1–2	Sierra Leone	Antalya, Turkey
15:00 UTC+3	Mboungou 89'	Report	Cesay 53', 64'	Stadium: Mardan Sports Complex

4 June 2023 AFCON qualification	Mali	4–0	Congo	Bamako, Mali
19:00 UTC+0	Camara 1'; Touré 11', 40'; Coulibaly 44'	Report		Stadium: Stade du 26 Mars; Referee: Abdel Aziz Bouh (Mauritania)

8 June 2023 AFCON qualification	Congo	1–0	Gambia	Brazzaville, Congo
17:00 UTC+1	Makoumbou 74'	Report		Stadium: Stade Alphonse Massemba-Débat; Referee: André Kolissala (Central African Republic)

28 August 2022 CHAN qualification	Central African Republic	2–1	Congo	Brazzaville, Congo
19:00 UTC+1	Toropité 7'; Mokonou 33'	Report	Bidimbou 44' (pen.)	Stadium: Stade Alphonse Massemba-Débat

4 September 2022 CHAN qualification	Congo	1–0	Central African Republic	Brazzaville, Congo
19:00 UTC+1	Bidimbou 64' (pen.)	Report		Stadium: Stade Alphonse Massemba-Débat

24 September Friendly	Congo	3–3	Madagascar	Mohammédia, Morocco
19:30 UTC+1	Mbenza 17' (pen.); Dembi 24'; Mboungou 70'	Report	Voavy 28'; Amada 56'; Ilaimaharitra 86' (pen.)	Stadium: Stade El Bachir; Referee: Redouane Jiyed (Morocco)

27 September Friendly	Mauritania	2–0	Congo	Mohammédia, Morocco
22:00 UTC+1	Thiam 46'; Kamara 47'	Report		Stadium: Stade El Bachir; Referee: Karim Sabry (Morocco)

=== 2023 ===
9 January Friendly	Congo	0–1	Senegal	Tabarka, Tunisia
12:00 CET (UTC+1)		Report	Camara 5'	Stadium: La Cigale Sport Complex

16 January 2022 CHAN	Cameroon	1–0	Congo	Oran, Algeria
20:00 UTC+1	Mbekeli 63'	Report		Stadium: Miloud Hadefi Stadium; Referee: Abdelaziz Bouh (Mauritania)

20 January 2022 CHAN	Congo	0–0	Niger	Oran, Algeria
20:00 UTC+1		Report		Stadium: Miloud Hadefi Stadium; Referee: Daouda Gueye (Senegal)

23 March 2023 AFCON qualification	Congo	1–2	South Sudan	Brazzaville, Congo
17:00 UTC+0	Bifouma 90' (pen.)	Report	Daniel 66'; Okello 90+6'	Stadium: Stade Alphonse Massemba-Débat; Referee: Celso Alvação (Mozambique)

27 March 2023 AFCON qualification	South Sudan	0–1	Congo	Dar es Salaam, Tanzania
16:00 UTC+3		Report	Charpentier 90'	Stadium: National Stadium; Referee: Joseph Odey Ogabor (Nigeria)

18 June 2023 AFCON qualification	Congo	0–2	Mali	Brazzaville, Congo
17:00 UTC+1		Report	Koné 62'; Nene 73'	Stadium: Stade Alphonse Massemba-Débat; Referee: Samir Guezzaz (Morocco)

10 September 2023 AFCON qualification	Gambia	2–2	Congo	Marrakesh, Morocco
20:00 UTC+1	Minteh 79'; Badamosi 90'	Report	Makouta 30'; Ganvoula 45+1' (pen.)	Stadium: Stade de Marrakech; Referee: Mohamed Maarouf Eid Mansour (Egypt)

17 November 2026 FIFA World Cup qualification	Zambia	4–2	Congo	Ndola, Zambia
18:00 UTC+2	Daka 5', 90+2'; Banda 43'; F. Sakala 69'	Report	Ganvoula 13'; Bassouamina 15'	Stadium: Levy Mwanawasa Stadium; Referee: Mahmoud El Banna (Egypt)

20 November 2026 FIFA World Cup qualification	Eritrea	Cancelled	Congo	Agadir, Morocco
17:00 UTC+1		Report		Stadium: Adrar Stadium

=== 2024 ===
25 March Friendly	Gabon	1–1	Congo	Chambly, France
20:30	Lemina 42'	Report	Ganvoula 73'	Stadium: Stade des Marais

6 June 2026 FIFA World Cup qualification	Congo	0–3; Awarded (Note: Niger were awarded a 3–0 victory by forfeit after Congo refused to travel to DR Congo for their home match on 6 June, insisting that they play in Brazzaville.)	Niger	Kinshasa, DR Congo
17:00 UTC+1		Report		Stadium: Stade des Martyrs

11 June 2026 FIFA World Cup qualification	Congo	0–6	Morocco	Agadir, Morocco
17:00 UTC+1		Report	Ounahi 8'; Riad 16'; El Kaabi 30', 39', 53'; Rahimi 62'	Stadium: Adrar Stadium; Attendance: 30,000; Referee: Daniel Nii Laryea (Ghana)

5 September 2025 AFCON qualification	Congo	1–0	South Sudan	Brazzaville, Congo
17:00 UTC+1	Massanga 12'	Report		Stadium: Stade Alphonse Massemba-Débat; Referee: Celso Armindo Alvação (Mozambique)

9 September 2025 AFCON qualification	Uganda	2–0	Congo	Kampala, Uganda
19:00 UTC+3	Kayondo 21'; Ssemugabi 85'	Report		Stadium: Mandela National Stadium; Attendance: 38,000; Referee: Mehrez Malki (Tunisia)

11 October 2025 AFCON qualification	South Africa	5–0	Congo	Gqeberha, South Africa
20:00 UTC+2	Mokoena 12', 27'; Aubaas 37'; Foster 52'; Rayners 78'	Report		Stadium: Nelson Mandela Bay Stadium; Referee: Dahane Beida (Mauritania)

15 October 2025 AFCON qualification	Congo	1–1	South Africa	Brazzaville, Congo
17:00 UTC+1	Bassouamina 45+3'	Report	Mokwana 33'	Stadium: Stade Alphonse Massemba-Débat; Referee: Mahmood Ali Mahmood Ismail (Sudan)

14 November 2025 AFCON qualification	South Sudan	3–2	Congo	Juba, South Sudan
14:00 UTC+2	Ezibon 31', 45+2'; Elly 84'	Report	Ibayi 26', 35'	Stadium: Juba Stadium; Referee: Aklesso Gnama (Togo)

19 November 2025 AFCON qualification	Congo	0–1	Uganda	Brazzaville, Congo
13:00 UTC+1		Report	Mutyaba 55'	Stadium: Stade Alphonse Massemba-Débat; Attendance: 15,000; Referee: Mohamed Maarouf Eid Mansour (Egypt)

21 December 2026 FIFA World Cup qualification	Equatorial Guinea	3–0; Awarded	Congo	Malabo, Equatorial Guinea
16:00 UTC+1		Report		Stadium: Nuevo Estadio de Malabo

29 December 2026 FIFA World Cup qualification	Congo	0–3; Awarded (Note: Initially, Congo won 2–1 on aggregate. However, following a ruling by the CAF Disciplinary Committee in favor of Equatorial Guinea, Congo was found to have fielded an ineligible player in both matches. As a result, both matches were declared forfeited by Congo, awarding Equatorial Guinea a 6–0 aggregate victory.)	Equatorial Guinea	Brazzaville, Congo
15:00 UTC+1	Mankou 16'; Lendambi 25' (pen.)	Report	Obiang 46'	Referee: Cregue Moukagni (Gabon)

=== 2025 ===
17 March 2026 FIFA World Cup qualification	Tanzania	3–0; Awarded (Note: Tanzania were awarded a 3–0 victory by forfeit due to Congo's suspension by FIFA on 6 February for government interference in Congolese Football Federation operations. The suspension was lifted on 14 May 2025.)	Congo	TBD, Tanzania

24 March 2026 FIFA World Cup qualification	Congo	0–3; Awarded (Note: Zambia were awarded a 3–0 victory by forfeit due to Congo's suspension by FIFA on 6 February for government interference in Congolese Football Federation operations. The suspension was lifted on 14 May 2025.)	Zambia	TBD, Congo

5 September 2026 FIFA World Cup qualification	Congo	1–1	Tanzania	Brazzaville, Congo
	Moussavou 68'	Report	Samatta 84'	Stadium: Stade Alphonse Massemba-Débat; Referee: Thabang Ketshabile (Botwsana)

8 September 2026 FIFA World Cup qualification	Congo	Canceled	Eritrea	TBD, Congo

8 October 2026 FIFA World Cup qualification	Niger	3–1	Congo	Ouagadougou, Burkina Faso
19:00 UTC+0	Sosah 45+2'; Oumarou 49'; Adebayor 67'	Report	Bassinga 90+4'	Stadium: Stade du 4 Août; Referee: Boubou Traoré (Mali)

13 October 2026 FIFA World Cup qualification	Morocco	1–0	Congo	Rabat, Morocco
20:00 UTC+1	En-Nesyri 63'	Report		Stadium: Prince Moulay Abdellah Stadium; Referee: Abdel Aziz Bouh (Mauritania)

== Forthcoming fixtures ==
The following matches are scheduled:

TBD 2027 AFCON qualification	Congo	v	Comoros	TBD, Congo
TBD				Stadium: TBD

TBD 2027 AFCON qualification	Comoros	v	Congo	TBD, Comoros
TBD				Stadium: TBD

TBD 2027 AFCON qualification	Congo	v	Namibia	TBD, Congo
TBD				Stadium: TBD

TBD 2027 AFCON qualification	Namibia	v	Congo	TBD, Namibia
TBD				Stadium: TBD

TBD 2027 AFCON qualification	Cameroon	v	Congo	TBD, Cameroon
TBD				Stadium: TBD

TBD 2027 AFCON qualification	Congo	v	Cameroon	TBD, Congo
TBD				Stadium: TBD

== Record by opponent ==
Team	Pld	W	D	L	GF	GA	GD	WPCT
Algeria	3	0	1	2	1	5	−4	0.00
Cameroon	3	0	2	1	2	3	−1	0.00
DR Congo	1	0	0	1	0	1	−1	0.00
Eswatini	2	1	1	0	2	0	+2	50.00
Gabon	1	0	1	0	1	1	0	0.00
Gambia	3	1	1	1	3	3	0	33.33
Guinea-Bissau	1	0	0	1	0	3	−3	0.00
Libya	1	1	0	0	1	0	+1	100.00
Morocco	3	0	0	3	0	8	−8	0.00
Mali	3	0	1	2	0	6	−6	0.00
Namibia	3	0	2	1	2	3	−1	0.00
Niger	5	1	2	2	4	7	−3	20.00
South Africa	2	0	1	1	1	6	−5	0.00
Rwanda	2	1	1	0	1	0	+1	50.00
Senegal	3	0	1	2	1	5	−4	0.00
South Sudan	4	2	0	2	6	6	0	50.00
Tanzania	2	0	1	1	1	4	−3	0.00
Togo	2	0	1	1	2	3	−1	0.00
Uganda	2	0	0	2	0	3	−3	0.00
Zambia	3	0	0	3	3	10	−7	0.00
Total	49	7	16	26	31	77	−46	14.29

Source: Results
