= 2022 African Nations Championship Group D =

Football tournament group stage

Group D of the 2022 African Nations Championship, consisting of Mali, Angola and Mauritania, began on 16 January and will end on 24 January 2023.

== Teams ==
| Draw position | Team | Zone | Date of qualification | Finals appearance | Last appearance | Previous best performance | | | | | | | |
|---|---|---|---|---|---|---|---|---|---|---|---|---|---|
| Draw position | Team | Zone | Date of qualification | Finals appearance | Last appearance | Previous best performance | D1 | Mali | Western Zone A | 3 September 2022 | 5th | 2020 | Runners-up (2016, 2020) |
| D2 | Angola | Southern Zone | 4 September 2022 | 4th | 2018 | Runners-up (2011) | | | | | | | |
| D3 | Mauritania | Western Zone A | 2 September 2022 | 3rd | 2018 | Group stage (2014, 2018) | | | | | | | |

== Standings ==
| Pos | Team | Pld | W | D | L | GF | GA | GD | Pts | Qualification |
|---|---|---|---|---|---|---|---|---|---|---|
| 1 | Mauritania | 2 | 1 | 1 | 0 | 1 | 0 | +1 | 4 | Knockout stage |
| 2 | Angola | 2 | 0 | 2 | 0 | 3 | 3 | 0 | 2 | |
| 3 | Mali | 2 | 0 | 1 | 1 | 3 | 4 | −1 | 1 | |

Source: CAF
Rules for classification: Tiebreakers

== Matches ==
=== Mali vs Angola ===
16 January 2023
17:00

| Mali | 3–3 | Angola |
|---|---|---|
| Sinayoko 23'; Diaby 79'; Coulibaly 83' | Report | Depú 12', 26'; Gilberto 72' |

Miloud Hadefi Stadium, Oran
Referee: Karim Sabry (Morocco)

| Mali | Angola |

Formation: 4–2–3–1
| GK | 1 | Germain Berthé (c) |
| DF | 2 | Ismael Bamba | | (substituted off) 61' |
| DF | 5 | Emile Kone | (yellow card) 54' |
| DF | 4 | Yoro Diaby |
| DF | 12 | Souleymane Coulibaly |
| MF | 14 | Fady Coulibaly | (yellow card) 30' | (substituted off) 61' |
| MF | 19 | Moussa Coulibaly |
| FW | 21 | Djibril Coulibaly | | (substituted off) 61' |
| MF | 6 | Makan Samabaly |
| FW | 26 | Sada Diallo | | (substituted off) 71' |
| FW | 10 | Hamidou Sinayoko |
Substitutions:
| MF | 24 | Oumar Camara |
| FW | 25 | Moctar Cisse |
| GK | 22 | N'Golo Traoré |
| MF | 23 | Cheick Keita |
| DF | 13 | Bangaly Barou Sanogo |
| GK | 16 | Aboubacar Doumbia |
| MF | 11 | Ibrahim Sidibé | | (substituted on) 61' |
| FW | 7 | Ousmane Coulibaly | | (substituted on) 71' |
| DF | 3 | Ousmane Diallo | | (substituted on) 61' |
| FW | 18 | Cheickna Diakité | | (substituted on) 61' |
| DF | 17 | Ahmed Diomande |
| FW | 9 | Moussa Koné |
Coach:
(Mali) Nouhoum Diane

Formation: 4–3–3
| GK | 1 | Hugo Marques |
| DF | 21 | Eddie Afonso |
| DF | 15 | Lulas |
| DF | 5 | Joaquim Balanga |
| DF | 13 | Augusto Carneiro |
| MF | 10 | Pedro Pessoa Miguel | | (substituted off) 79' |
| MF | 4 | Além |
| MF | 18 | Herenilson (c) |
| FW | 7 | Gilberto |
| FW | 9 | Depú | (yellow card) 38' | (substituted off) 71' |
| FW | 11 | Jaredi Teixeira | | (substituted off) 79' |
Substitutions:
| MF | 6 | Manuel Keliano |
| MF | 24 | Ganga |
| MF | 16 | Higino |
| FW | 17 | Bito | | (substituted on) 79' |
| GK | 12 | Sambambi |
| FW | 19 | Julinho | | (substituted on) 67' |
| DF | 25 | Hossi |
| MF | 23 | Victoriano | (yellow card) 88' | (substituted on) 79' |
| FW | 20 | Lépua |
| GK | 22 | Adilson da Cruz |
| DF | 2 | Kibeixa |
| DF | 8 | Paízo |
Coach:
(Portugal) Pedro Gonçalves

Man of the Match:
Yoro Diaby (Mali)

Assistant referees:
Adou Hermann Desire Ngoh (Ivory Coast)
Dieudonne Mutuyimana (Rwanda)
Fourth official:
Mahmood Ali Ismail (Sudan)

=== Angola vs Mauritania ===
20 January 2023
17:00

| Angola | 0–0 | Mauritania |
|---|---|---|
| | Report |

Miloud Hadefi Stadium, Oran
Referee: Djindo Louis Hougnandande (Benin)

| Angola | Mauritania |

Formation: 4–3–3
| GK | 1 | Hugo Marques |
| DF | 13 | Augusto Carneiro | | (substituted off) 85' |
| DF | 5 | Joaquim Balanga |
| DF | 15 | Lulas | | (substituted off) 85' |
| DF | 21 | Eddie Afonso | | (substituted off) 85' |
| MF | 10 | Pedro Pessoa Miguel |
| MF | 4 | Além |
| MF | 18 | Herenilson (c) | (yellow card) 49' | (substituted off) 58' |
| FW | 11 | Jaredi Teixeira | | (substituted off) 58' |
| FW | 9 | Depú |
| FW | 7 | Gilberto | (yellow card) 28' |
Substitutions:
| FW | 19 | Julinho | | (substituted on) 58' |
| MF | 6 | Manuel Keliano | | (substituted on) 58' |
| MF | 23 | Victoriano |
| GK | 12 | Sambambi |
| MF | 24 | Ganga |
| FW | 17 | Bito |
| MF | 16 | Higino |
| FW | 20 | Lépua | | (substituted on) 85' |
| DF | 2 | Kibeixa | | (substituted on) 85' |
| DF | 8 | Paízo | | (substituted on) 85' |
| DF | 25 | Hossi |
| GK | 22 | Adilson da Cruz |
Coach:
(Portugal) Pedro Gonçalves

Formation: 4–4–2
| GK | 16 | Namori Diaw | (yellow card) 90+6' |
| DF | 2 | Soukrana Mheimid | (yellow card) 42' |
| DF | 4 | Nouh El Abd |
| DF | 5 | Demini Saleck |
| DF | 3 | Mohamedhen Beibou |
| MF | 23 | Sidi Bouna Amar | | (substituted off) 90+3' |
| MF | 6 | Sidi El Abd |
| MF | 8 | Mouhsine Bodda |
| MF | 10 | Bessam (c) | | (substituted off) 90+3' |
| FW | 7 | Mamadou Sy | (yellow card) 40' | (substituted off) 67' |
| FW | 9 | Hemeya Tanjy | | (substituted off) 81' |
Substitutions:
| DF | 13 | Thierno Ba |
| GK | 22 | Mahmoud Mbodj |
| MF | 18 | Mouhamed Lejouade |
| FW | 20 | Yassin El Welly | | (substituted on) 67' |
| DF | 15 | Demba Trawré |
| FW | 17 | Sidi Abdoullah Touda |
| GK | 1 | M'Backé N'Diaye |
| MF | 21 | Mohamed Lemine | | (substituted on) 90+3' |
| MF | 24 | Yacoub Sidi Ethmane | | (substituted on) 90+3' |
| DF | 12 | El Mokhtar Bilal |
| MF | 11 | Moulaye Mhamed Moulaye Idriss |
| FW | 25 | Mahmoud El Hassan | | (substituted on) 81' |
Coach:
(France) Amir Abdou

Man of the Match:
Gilberto (Angola)

Assistant referees:
Eric Ayimavo Ulrich Ayamr (Benin)
Carine Atezambong Fomo (Cameroon)
Fourth official:
Vincentia Amédomé (Togo)

=== Mauritania vs Mali ===
24 January 2023
17:00

| Mauritania | 1–0 | Mali |
|---|---|---|
| Sy 53' | Report |

Miloud Hadefi Stadium, Oran
Attendance: 4,389
Referee: Mohamed Adel (Egypt)

| Mauritania | Mali |

Formation: 4–2–3–1
| GK | 16 | Namori Diaw |
| DF | 3 | Mohamedhen Beibou | (yellow card) 22' |
| DF | 5 | Demini Saleck |
| DF | 4 | Nouh El Abd |
| DF | 2 | Soukrana Mheimid |
| MF | 8 | Mouhsine Bodda |
| MF | 6 | Sidi El Abd |
| MF | 10 | Bessam (c) | | (substituted off) 87' |
| MF | 9 | Hemeya Tanjy |
| MF | 23 | Sidi Bouna Amar |
| FW | 7 | Mamadou Sy | | (substituted off) 87' |
Substitutions:
| DF | 15 | Demba Trawré |
| MF | 19 | Sidi Eddey |
| GK | 22 | Mahmoud Mbodj |
| GK | 1 | M'Backé N'Diaye |
| FW | 17 | Sidi Abdoullah Touda |
| MF | 24 | Yacoub Sidi Ethmane | | (substituted on) 87' |
| FW | 20 | Yassin El Welly |
| DF | 13 | Thierno Ba |
| MF | 18 | Mouhamed Lejouade |
| MF | 21 | Mohamed Lemine | | (substituted on) 87' |
| DF | 12 | El Mokhtar Bilal |
| FW | 25 | Mahmoud El Hassan |
Coach:
(Mali) Amir Abdou

Formation: 4–2–3–1
| GK | 1 | Germain Berthé (c) |
| DF | 12 | Souleymane Coulibaly |
| DF | 4 | Yoro Diaby |
| DF | 5 | Emile Kone |
| DF | 3 | Ousmane Diallo |
| MF | 19 | Moussa Coulibaly |
| MF | 6 | Makan Samabaly | | (substituted off) 88' |
| MF | 7 | Ousmane Coulibaly | | (substituted off) 88' |
| MF | 11 | Ibrahim Sidibé | | (substituted off) 78' |
| MF | 21 | Djibril Coulibaly | | (substituted off) 77' |
| FW | 9 | Moussa Koné | (yellow card) 29' | (substituted off) 77' |
Substitutions:
| FW | 18 | Cheickna Diakité | | (substituted on) 77' |
| FW | 25 | Moctar Cisse | | (substituted on) 78' |
| DF | 13 | Bangaly Barou Sanogo |
| DF | 17 | Ahmed Diomande | | (substituted on) 88' |
| GK | 22 | N'Golo Traoré |
| FW | 26 | Sada Diallo |
| MF | 14 | Fady Coulibaly | | (substituted on) 88' |
| GK | 16 | Aboubacar Doumbia |
| DF | 2 | Ismael Bamba |
| MF | 23 | Cheick Keita |
| FW | 10 | Hamidou Sinayoko | | (substituted on) 77' |
| MF | 20 | Nankoma Keita |
Coach:
(Mali) Nouhoum Diane

Man of the Match:
Hemeya Tanjy (Mauritania)

Assistant referees:
Akram Abbes Zerhouni (Algeria)
Sid Ali Brahim El Hamlaoui (Algeria)
Fourth official:
Mehrez Melki (Tunisia)

== Discipline ==
Fair play points would have been used as tiebreakers if the overall and head-to-head records of teams were tied. These were calculated based on yellow and red cards received in all group matches as follows:

- first yellow card: −1 point;
- indirect red card (second yellow card): −3 points;
- direct red card: −4 points;
- yellow card and direct red card: −5 points;

Only one of the above deductions was applied to a player in a single match.

| Team | Match 1 | | | | Match 2 | | | | Points |
| Team | Booked | (yellow card) (yellow-red card) | Sent off (straight red) | (yellow card) (red card) | Booked | (yellow card) (yellow-red card) | Sent off (straight red) | (yellow card) (red card) | Points |
|---|---|---|---|---|---|---|---|---|---|
| Mali | 2 | | | | 1 | | | | –3 |
| Angola | 2 | | | | 2 | | | | –4 |
| Mauritania | 3 | | | | 1 | | | | –4 |
