= Pape Sy =

Pape Sy may refer to:

- Pape Sy (basketball) (born 1988), French basketball player
- Pape Sy (footballer) (born 1997), Senegalese footballer
