= 2022 African Nations Championship Group E =

Football tournament group stage

Group E of the 2022 African Nations Championship, consisting of Cameroon, Congo and Niger, began on 16 January and will end on 24 January 2023.

== Teams ==
Draw position	Team	Zone	Date of qualification	Finals appearance	Last appearance	Previous best performance							
Draw position	Team	Zone	Date of qualification	Finals appearance	Last appearance	Previous best performance	E1	Cameroon	Central Zone	4 September 2022	5th	2020	Fourth place (2020)
E2	Congo	Central Zone	4 September 2022	4th	2020	Quarter-finals (2018, 2020)							
E3	Niger	Western Zone B	3 September 2022	4th	2020	Quarter-finals (2011)							

== Standings ==
Pos	Team	Pld	W	D	L	GF	GA	GD	Pts	Qualification
1	Niger	2	1	1	0	1	0	+1	4	Knockout stage
2	Cameroon	2	1	0	1	1	1	0	3	
3	Congo	2	0	1	1	0	1	−1	1	

Source: CAF
Rules for classification: Tiebreakers

== Matches ==
=== Cameroon vs Congo ===
16 January 2023
20:00

Cameroon	1–0	Congo
Mbekeli 63'	Report

Miloud Hadefi Stadium, Oran
Referee: Abdelaziz Bouh (Mauritania)

Cameroon	Congo

Formation: 4–3–3
GK	23	Marcelin Mbahbi
DF	18	Saidou Ibrahim
DF	3	Yves Alain Moukoko (c)
DF	6	Che Malone
DF	4	Bawak Thomas Etta
MF	8	Arthur Avon	(substituted off) 89'
MF	19	Louiz Mbah
MF	13	Djawal Kaiba
FW	14	Ramses Nguimzeu
FW	11	Kemajou Dibami	(substituted off) 67'
FW	2	Jerome Ngom Mbekeli
Substitutions:
FW	25	Roche Foning
MF	24	Joel Patten
GK	1	Patrick Lionel Kibyen
MF	17	Cedrick Martial Zemba
DF	12	Ibrahim Abba
DF	5	Donatien Tchami
FW	7	Guy Eyike
MF	22	Joseph Iyendjock
MF	10	Valentin Beo Batto	(substituted on) 89'
MF	21	Prince Junior Sime
DF	20	Houzaifi Youssoufa
FW	15	Harisson Djonkep	(substituted on) 67'
Coach:
(Cameroon) Alioum Saidou

Formation: 4–4–2
GK	23	Pavelh Ndzila (c)
DF	14	Faria Ondongo
DF	4	Julfin Ondongo		(substituted off) 52'
DF	5	Carof Bakoua		(substituted off) 25'
DF	3	Hernest Bryock Malonga
MF	21	Prince Ilendo		(substituted off) 52'
MF	8	Hardy Binguila
MF	6	Joseph Mbangou
MF	24	Love Bissila		(substituted off) 46'
FW	10	Prince Obongo		(substituted off) 46'
FW	9	Déo Bassinga	(yellow card) 81'
Substitutions:
FW	22	Japhet Mankou
FW	11	Domi Massoumou		(substituted on) 46'
DF	25	Arnauvy Mombouli		(substituted on) 52'
FW	13	Junior Elenga
FW	20	Kader Bidimbou		(substituted on) 52'
MF	2	Venold Dzaba
GK	1	Giscard Mavoungou
MF	18	Borel Tomandzoto		(substituted on) 46'
FW	7	Exaucé Nzahou
GK	16	Chansel Massa Mohikola
DF	15	Janard Mbemba		(substituted on) 25'
DF	19	Luifrid Lessomo
Coach:
(Republic of the Congo) Jean Élie Ngoya Obackas

Man of the Match:
Jerome Ngom Mbekeli (Cameroon)

Assistant referees:
Nouha Bangoura (Senegal)
Eric Ayimavo Ulrich Ayamr (Benin)
Fourth official:
Djindo Louis Hougnandande (Benin)

=== Congo vs Niger ===
20 January 2023
20:00

Congo	0–0	Niger
	Report

Miloud Hadefi Stadium, Oran
Referee: Daouda Gueye (Senegal)

Congo	Niger

Formation: 4–2–3–1
GK	23	Pavelh Ndzila (c)
DF	3	Hernest Bryock Malonga
DF	19	Luifrid Lessomo
DF	25	Arnauvy Mombouli
DF	15	Janard Mbemba
MF	6	Joseph Mbangou	(yellow card) 64'
MF	28	Junior Ngoma Ndzaou	(yellow card) 15'	(substituted off) 90+1'
MF	13	Junior Elenga		(substituted off) 69'
MF	18	Borel Tomandzoto
MF	21	Prince Ilendo		(substituted off) 69'
FW	9	Déo Bassinga
Substitutions:
FW	22	Japhet Mankou		(substituted on) 69'
GK	1	Giscard Mavoungou
MF	24	Love Bissila		(substituted on) 69'
FW	10	Prince Obongo
FW	7	Exaucé Nzahou
GK	16	Chansel Massa Mohikola
DF	14	Faria Ondongo
MF	8	Hardy Binguila
FW	11	Domi Massoumou		(substituted on) 90+1'
MF	2	Venold Dzaba
Coach:
(Republic of the Congo) Jean Élie Ngoya Obackas

Formation: 4–1–2–1–2
GK	22	Mahamadou Djibo
DF	5	Abdoul Adamou Garba	(yellow card) 18'
DF	15	Boureima Katakore (c)
DF	3	Ismael Souley
DF	2	Adamou Djibo
MF	8	Moussa Kassa Moudou		(substituted off) 66'
MF	23	Kader Aboubacar
MF	20	Faysal Abdoulaye
MF	14	Imarana Seyni		(substituted off) 56'
FW	9	Abdoul Aziz Ibrahim		(substituted off) 86'
FW	18	Bilyamine Moussa		(substituted off) 56'
Substitutions:
MF	24	Marouf Salissou
FW	7	Yacine Wa Massamba		(substituted on) 86'
MF	21	Ziyad El-Jaouni		(substituted on) 66'
DF	25	Laouali Salaou
GK	1	Yahaya Mainassara Babari
FW	10	Mossi Issa Moussa		(substituted on) 56'
FW	4	Ibrahim Oumarou		(substituted on) 56'
DF	26	Alhabib Hassane
MF	13	Mahamadou Ibrahim
DF	17	Mohamed Idrissa Karimou
GK	16	Issiaka Kanta
DF	6	Abdoul Kassali
Coach:
(Niger) Harouna Doula Gabde

Man of the Match:
Junior Ngoma Ndzaou (Congo)

Assistant referees:
Abdul Aziz Bollel Jawo (Gambia)
Hamedine Diba (Mauritania)
Fourth official:
Abdelaziz Bouh (Mauritania)

=== Niger vs Cameroon ===
24 January 2023
20:00

Niger	1–0	Cameroon
Badamassi 69'	Report

Miloud Hadefi Stadium, Oran
Referee: Celso Armindo Alvação (Mozambique)

Niger	Cameroon

Formation: 4–2–3–1
GK	22	Mahamadou Djibo
DF	2	Adamou Djibo
DF	3	Ismael Souley	(yellow card) 86'
DF	15	Boureima Katakore (c)
DF	5	Abdoul Adamou Garba
MF	23	Kader Aboubacar
MF	20	Faysal Abdoulaye	(yellow card) 40'
MF	14	Imarana Seyni		(substituted off) 46'
MF	18	Bilyamine Moussa
MF	9	Abdoul Aziz Ibrahim		(substituted off) 62'
FW	11	Boubacar Hainikoye
Substitutions:
DF	6	Abdoul Kassali
MF	12	Ousseini Badamassi		(substituted on) 46' (substituted off) 86'
MF	24	Marouf Salissou		(substituted on) 62'
FW	10	Mossi Issa Moussa
FW	4	Ibrahim Oumarou
DF	17	Mohamed Idrissa Karimou
GK	16	Issiaka Kanta
MF	13	Mahamadou Ibrahim
MF	8	Moussa Kassa Moudou		(substituted on) 89'
FW	7	Yacine Wa Massamba
MF	21	Ziyad El-Jaouni
DF	25	Laouali Salaou
Coach:
(Niger) Harouna Doula Gabde

Formation: 4–3–3
GK	23	Marcelin Mbahbi
DF	4	Bawak Thomas Etta		(substituted off) 73'
DF	3	Yves Alain Moukoko (c)
DF	6	Che Malone	(yellow card) 2'
DF	18	Saidou Ibrahim
MF	13	Djawal Kaiba	(yellow card) 61'	(substituted off) 63'
MF	19	Louiz Mbah
MF	8	Arthur Avon
FW	2	Jerome Ngom Mbekeli
FW	25	Roche Foning
FW	15	Harisson Djonkep		(substituted off) 88'
Substitutions:
DF	20	Houzaifi Youssoufa
GK	1	Patrick Lionel Kibyen
FW	7	Guy Eyike		(substituted on) 88'
MF	17	Cedrick Martial Zemba
MF	24	Joel Patten
FW	9	Emmanuel Beken
FW	11	Kemajou Dibami
DF	5	Donatien Tchami
MF	21	Prince Junior Sime	(substituted on) 63'	(substituted off) 88'
FW	14	Ramses Nguimzeu		(substituted on) 73'
MF	10	Valentin Beo Batto
MF	22	Joseph Iyendjock
Coach:
(Cameroon) Alioum Saidou

Man of the Match:
Boubacar Hainikoye (Niger)

Assistant referees:
Dos Reis Abelmiro Montenegro (São Tomé and Príncipe)
Diana Chikotescha (Zambia)
Fourth official:
Daouda Guèye (Senegal)

== Discipline ==
Fair play points would have been used as tiebreakers if the overall and head-to-head records of teams were tied. These were calculated based on yellow and red cards received in all group matches as follows:

- first yellow card: −1 point;
- indirect red card (second yellow card): −3 points;
- direct red card: −4 points;
- yellow card and direct red card: −5 points;

Only one of the above deductions was applied to a player in a single match.

Team	Match 1				Match 2				Points
Team	Booked	(yellow card) (yellow-red card)	Sent off (straight red)	(yellow card) (red card)	Booked	(yellow card) (yellow-red card)	Sent off (straight red)	(yellow card) (red card)	Points
Cameroon					2				–2
Congo	1				2				–3
Niger	1				2				–3
