= Gilberto (footballer, born 2001) =

Angolan footballer

Gilberto Gibelé
Personal information
- Birth name: Deivi Miguel Vieira
- Date of birth: March 10, 2001 (age 25)
- Place of birth: Luanda, Angola
- Height: 1.77 m (5 ft 9 1/2 in)
- Position: Winger

Team information
- Current team: Orlando Pirates
- Number: 11

Senior career*
Years	Team	Apps	(Gls)
2019–2020	Real Sambila		
2020–2022	Libolo	20	(3)
2022-2024	Petro de Luanda	30	(16)
2024-	Orlando Pirates	2	(0)
2025-	→ Petro de Luanda (Loan)	0	(0)

International career^{‡}
2022–	Angola	13	(3)
- * Club domestic league appearances and goals ‡ National team caps and goals as of 2 February 2024

Deivi Miguel Vieira (born 10 March 2001), better known as Gilberto or Gibelé, is an Angolan professional footballer who plays as a winger for Petro de Luanda on Loan from Orlando Pirates and the Angola national team.

== Career ==
Gilberto began his senior career with the Angolan Third Division side Real Sambila in 2019, and shortly after moved to the Girabola with Libolo in 2020. On 27 June 2022, he transferred to Petro de Luanda on a three-year contract. He helped Petro de Luanda win the 2022–23 Girabola and 2022–23 Angola Cup in his debut season.

== International ==
Gilberto was first called up to the Angola national team to play at the 2022 African Nations Championship. He was called up to the national team for the 2023 Africa Cup of Nations.

=== International goals ===
Scores and results list Angola's goal tally first.

No.	Date	Venue	Opponent	Score	Result	Competition
1.	4 September 2022	Dobsonville Stadium, Soweto, South Africa	South Africa	2–1	4–1	2022 African Nations Championship qualification
2.	16 January 2023	Miloud Hadefi Stadium, Oran, Algeria	Mali	3–1	3–3	2022 African Nations Championship
3.	20 January 2024	Stade de la Paix, Bouaké, Ivory Coast	Mauritania	3–1	3–2	2023 Africa Cup of Nations

== Honours ==
Petro de Luanda

- Girabola: 2022–23
- Angola Cup: 2022–23

Orlando Pirates

MTN 8: 2024-25
