= Chahid Hamlaoui Stadium =

Sports venue in Constantine, Algeria

Coordinates: 36°20′57″N 6°37′33″E

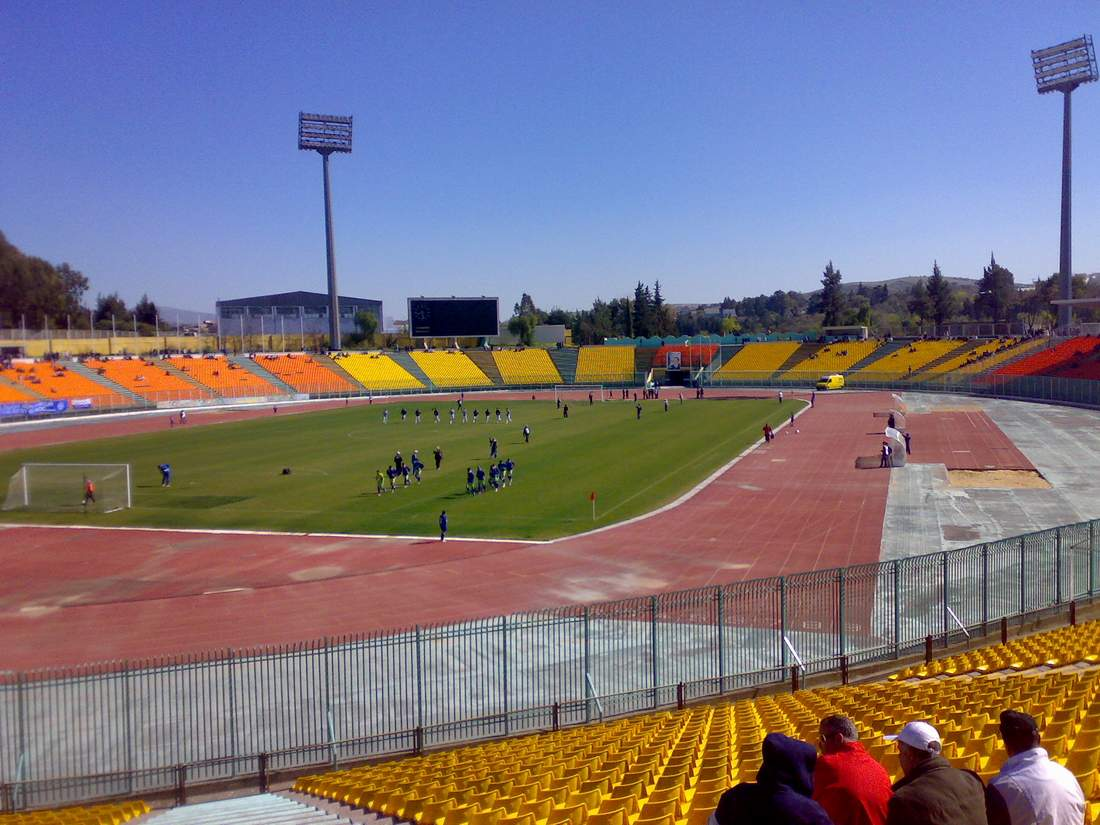
- Interactive map of Chahid Hamlaoui Stadium
- Full name: Chahid Hamlaoui Stadium
- Former names: 17 June Stadium
- Location: Constantine, Algeria
- Owner: APC of Constantine
- Capacity: 22,968
- Surface: Hybrid grass
- Scoreboard: Condor Electronics scoreboard screen

Construction
- Built: 1971
- Opened: 5 July 1973
- Renovated: 2007, 2022
- Cost: 1.6 Billion DZD (≈ 12 millions € for 2022 renovation)

Tenants
- CS Constantine; MO Constantine; Algeria national football team

Chahid Hamlaoui Stadium (Arabic: ملعب الشهيد حملاوي) is a multi-use stadium in Constantine, Algeria. It is currently used mostly for football matches. The stadium has an actual capacity of 22,968 people. It serves as the home ground of CS Constantine and MO Constantine.

== History ==
Two years after the start of its construction in 1971, the largest stadium in Constantine opened its doors on the 11th anniversary of the country's independence, on 5 July 1973. Named after Chahid Slimane Daoudi called Hamlaoui, a nationalist militant who died during the Algerian War. The first match in this stadium took place on Wednesday, April 3, 1974, during the final of the military championship. November 17, 1978, the Chahid-Hamlaoui stadium hosted the first friendly match of the Algerian national team, which met its Congolese counterpart, this match ended with a victory for the Greens by 3–0.

In the early 1980s, the Chahid-Hamlaoui stadium hosted the matches of the Algerian national team during the 1982 World Cup qualifiers, where it witnessed the first qualification in the history of the Algerian team for the World Cup. The stadium hosted the matches of Sudan, Niger, and finally, Nigeria, all of which saw victory for Algeria, including the last game against Nigeria, with the two goals of Lakhdar Belloumi and Rabah Madjer.

In 2007, it benefited from renovations including the installation of a natural lawn as well as the rehabilitation of its changing rooms. The work was carried out in particular to improve the conditions of the stadium's residents, but also to see the Algerian national team evolve.

In 2020, the stadium benefited from a major rehabilitation project in anticipation of the 2022 African Nations Championship, organized by Algeria between 8 and 31 January 2023. The rehabilitation works included the construction of a natural grass lawn, the placement of a giant screen with a high-quality image, the restoration of the stands, the reinforcement of the roof, the development of new entrances and aisles of this structure, as well as the endowment portals by electronic ticketing equipment.

== Tenants and events ==
=== 2022 African Nations Championship ===
The stadium was renovated in 2022 to host some of the games of the 2022 African Nations Championship. It hosted three matches of Group C and one match in the quarter-finals, though it was initially planned to host five games at the group stage. But Morocco, one of the teams at group c, had withdrawn from the tournament on 12 January 2023, after hosts Algeria refused to allow the squad to take a direct flight from Rabat to Constantine via their national airline and official carrier sponsor, Royal Air Maroc. As a result, the three games of Morocco at the group got canceled.

Date	Local time	Team No. 1	Result	Team No. 2	Round
15 January 2023	17:00	Morocco	(0–3) Cancelled	Sudan	Group C
15 January 2023	20:00	Madagascar	2–1	Ghana	Group C
19 January 2023	17:00	Morocco	(0–3) Cancelled	Madagascar	Group C
19 January 2023	20:00	Ghana	3–1	Sudan	Group C
23 January 2023	20:00	Ghana	(3–0) Cancelled	Morocco	Group C
23 January 2023	20:00	Sudan	0–3	Madagascar	Group C
28 January 2023	17:00	Madagascar	3–1	Mozambique	Quarter-finals

== Algeria national football team matches ==
The Stade Mohamed Hamlaoui has hosted six games of the Algeria national football team, against China PR and Sudan in 1980, Niger and Nigeria in 1981, Egypt in 1989, and the Senegal in 1990.

12 December 1980
00:00 UTC+1

Algeria	2 – 0	Sudan
Bensaoula 9'; Fergani 45'	Report

Stade 17 Juin 1976, Constantine
Attendance: 50,000
Referee: Aissaoui Boudabbous (Tunisia)

1 May 1981
00:00 UTC+1

Algeria	4–0	Niger
Madjer 44'; Belloumi 46', 77'; Korichi 53'	Report

Stade 17 Juin 1976, Constantine
Attendance: 60,000
Referee: Doudou N'Jie (Gambia)

30 October 1981
00:00 UTC+1

Algeria	2–1	Nigeria
Belloumi 9'; Madjer 85'	Report	Owolabi 40'

Stade 17 Juin 1976, Constantine
Attendance: 60,000
Referee: André Daina (Switzerland)

8 October 1989
00:00 UTC+1

Algeria	0–0	Egypt
	Report

Stade 17 Juin 1976, Constantine
Attendance: 55,000
Referee: Sydney Picon-Ackong (Mauritius)

17 December 1990
00:00 UTC+1

Algeria	1–0	Senegal
Haraoui 60'	Report

Stade 17 Juin 1976, Constantine
Attendance: 20,000
Referee: Boucetta (Tunisia)

12 August 2017
20:45 WAT
2018 CHANQ

Algeria	1–2	Libya
Darfalou 1'	Report	Rahmani 5' (o.g.); Ellafi 49'

Chahid Hamlaoui Stadium, Constantine
Attendance: 13,000
Referee: Samir Guezzaz (Morocco)

5 September 2017
20:30 UTC+1

Algeria	0–1	Zambia
	Report (FIFA); Report (CAF)	Daka 66'

Chahid Hamlaoui Stadium, Constantine
Attendance: 35,000
Referee: Mahamadou Keita (Mali)

10 November 2017
20:30 UTC+1

Algeria	3–0 Awarded	Nigeria
Brahimi 88' (pen.)	Report (FIFA); Report (CAF)	Ogu 62'

Chahid Hamlaoui Stadium, Constantine
Attendance: 30,000
Referee: Eric Otogo-Castane (Gabon)

12 October 2023
20:00 UTC+1

Algeria	5–1	Cape Verde
Amoura 12'; Aouar 39', 41'; Zerrouki 61'; Slimani 89' (pen.)	Report	Bebé 55'

Chahid Hamlaoui Stadium, Constantine, Algeria
Referee: Mehrez Melki (Tunisia)

== See also ==
- List of football stadiums in Algeria
- List of association football stadiums by capacity
