= Mohamed Lemine =

Mauritanian footballer (born 2002)

Personal information
- Full name: Mohamed Lemine Hawbott Dah
- Date of birth: 6 January 2002 (age 24)
- Place of birth: Tevragh-Zeina, Mauritania
- Height: 1.78 m (5 ft 10 in)
- Position: Defender

Team information
- Current team: Egnatia
- Number: 20

Senior career*
| Years | Team | Apps | (Gls) |
| 2020–2021 | ASC Nasr de Sebkha | | |
| 2021–2023 | Nouakchott Kings | | |
| 2023– | Chemal | 0 | (0) |
| 2023– | → Egnatia (loan) | 11 | (1) |

International career^{‡}
| 2021 | Mauritania U20 | 3 | (0) |
| 2023– | Mauritania | 3 | (0) |
- * Club domestic league appearances and goals as of 18 April 2024 ‡ National team caps and goals as of 18 April 2024

Mohamed Lemine Hawbott Dah (born 6 January 2002) is a professional footballer who plays as a defender and midfielder for Albanian club Egnatia in Kategoria Superiore as well as the Mauritania national team.

== Honours ==
Egnatia

- Albanian Cup: 2023–24
