= Pape Sy (footballer) =

Senegalese footballer (born 1997)

Personal information
- Full name: Pape Mamadou Sy
- Date of birth: 2 May 1997 (age 29)
- Place of birth: Louga, Senegal
- Height: 2.06 m (6 ft 9 in)
- Position: Goalkeeper

Team information
- Current team: Metz
- Number: 61

Youth career
- 2008–2012: ASC Marbath
- 2012–2015: Étoile Lusitana
- 2015–2016: ASAC Ndiambour
- 2016–2017: Génération Foot

Senior career*
| Years | Team | Apps | (Gls) |
| 2017–2023 | Génération Foot | | |
| 2023–2024 | Seraing | 15 | (0) |
| 2024– | Metz | 11 | (0) |

International career^{‡}
| 2023– | Senegal | 7 | (0) |
- * Club domestic league appearances and goals as of 23:01, 10 May 2026 (UTC) ‡ National team caps and goals as of 15:26, 7 July 2025 (UTC)

Pape Mamadou Sy (born 2 May 1997) is a Senegalese professional football player who plays as a goalkeeper for Ligue 1 club Metz and the Senegal national team.

== Career ==
A youth product of the clubs ASC Marbath, Étoile Lusitana and ASAC Ndiambour, Sy moved to Génération Foot in 2016 where he began his senior career. He helped the club win the 2018–19 and 2022–23 Senegal Ligue 1 titles. On 28 August 2023, he transferred to the Belgian Challenger Pro League club Seraing. On 26 July 2024, he transferred to the French Ligue 1 club Metz on a 2-year contract.

== International career ==
Sy was the starting goalkeeper for the Senegal national team that won the 2022 African Nations Championship. IN that tournament, he was named the Goalkeeper of the Tournament and was named in the Team of the Tournament.

== Career statistics ==
=== Club ===
As of match played 10 May 2026

Appearances and goals by club, season and competition
| Club | Season | League | | | National cup | | Continental | | Other | | Total | |
| Club | Season | League | Apps | Goals | Apps | Goals | Apps | Goals | Apps | Goals | Apps | Goals |
|---|---|---|---|---|---|---|---|---|---|---|---|---|
| Génération Foot | 2019–20 | — | | | — | | 1 (Note: Appearance in CAF Champions League) | 0 | — | | 1 | 0 |
| Seraing | 2023–24 | Challenger Pro League | 15 | 0 | — | | — | | — | | 15 | 0 |
| Metz II | 2024–25 | National 3 | 3 | 0 | — | | — | | — | | 3 | 0 |
| Metz | 2024–25 | Ligue 2 | 3 | 0 | — | | — | | 3 (Note: Appearances in Ligue 1 relegation/promotion play-offs) | 0 | 6 | 0 |
| Metz | 2025–26 | Ligue 1 | 8 | 0 | 0 | 0 | — | | — | | 8 | 0 |
| Metz | Total | | 11 | 0 | 0 | 0 | — | | 3 | 0 | 14 | 0 |
| career total | | | 29 | 0 | 0 | 0 | 1 | 0 | 3 | 0 | 33 | 0 |

=== International ===
As of match played 9 September 2023

Appearances and goals by national team and year
| National team | Year | Apps | Goals |
|---|---|---|---|
| Senegal | 2023 | 7 | 0 |
| Total | | 7 | 0 |

== Honours ==
=== Club ===
Génération Foot

- Senegal Ligue 1: 2018–19, 2022–23
- Senegal FA Cup: 2018

=== National team ===
Senegal national team

- African Nations Championship: 2022

=== Individual ===
- 2022 African Nations Championship Goalkeeper of the Tournament
- 2022 African Nations Championship Team of the Tournament
