= 2018 Senegal FA Cup =

Tournament details
- Country: Senegal

Final positions
- Champions: Génération Foot

The 2018 Coupe du Sénégal is the 56th edition of the Coupe du Sénégal, the knockout football competition of Senegal.

== Preliminary round ==
[Feb ?] Thiossane Passy lt Nguelemou

== First round ==
[Feb 14,15]

Diambars FC bt ASC Dahra

Stade de Mbour lt Olympique de Ngor

Jaraaf lt Jamono Fatick

US Ouakam bt Yeggo Foot Pro

CNEPS de Thiès bt RS Yoff

Africa Promo Foot lt Kaolack FC

US Gorée bt Ndar Guedj

Mbour PC bt UCST Port

Cayor Foot lt Demba Diop de Mbour

Académie Darou Salam bt Ndiolofène Saint-Louis

Renaissance de Dakar bt ASC HLM

Darou Salam Sébikotane bt ASC Saloum

Teungueth FC bt Racing de Dakar

Amitié FC de Thiès lt DUC

Santhiaba Ziguinchor lt Sonacos

US Parcelles Assainies lt NGB Niary Tally

Etoile Lusitana lt AS Douanes

EJ Fatick bt US Rail

Agora lt Linguère de Saint-Louis

Dekkendo de Louga bt AJEL de Rufisque

AS Kolda lt CSAD de Dakar

Keur Madior lt Casa Sports

Kawral de Vélingara bt Jeanne d'Arc

ASFA lt ETICS

Génération Foot bt Wallydaan de Thiès

Avenir de Mbacké lt Louga FC

ASC Cambérène bt Olympique de Ziguinchor

Zig Inter Académie bt Dakar Sacré-Cœur

Thiès FC bt Nguélémou

Assur lt AS Pikine

Espoirs de Guédiawaye bt ASAC Ndiambour

Bargueth de Kébémer lt Guédiawaye FC

== Second round ==
Diambars FC bt Linguère de Saint-Louis

UA Ouakam lt NGB Niary Tally

Demba Diop de Mbour bt Mbour PC

Académie Darou Salam lt EJ Fatick

Guédiawaye FC lt Renaissance Dakar

Kaolack FC bt ETICS

DUC bt Sonacos

AS Douanes bt Casa Sport

ASC Cambéréne lt CSAD de Dakar

Espoirs de Guadéwaye bt US Gorée

Jamono Fatick bt AS Pikine

Kawral de Vélingara bt Louga FC

Génération Foot bt Darou Salam Sébikotane

Teungueth FC 4-1 Thiès FC

CNEPS de Thiès lt Olympique de Ngor

Dekkendo de Louga bt Zig Inter Académie

== Round of 16 ==
[Mar 29]

Espoirs de Guédiawaye 1-3 Génération Foot

Jamono Fatick 2-1 Demba Diop de Mbour

AS Douanes 0-0 Diambars FC [4-3 pen]

CSAD de Dakar 1-0 EJ Fatick

Kawral de Vélingara 3-1 DUC

Renaissance Dakar 2-0 Kaolack FC

Olympique de Ngor 0-1 NGB Niary Tally

[Apr ?]

Dekkendo de Louga lt Teungueth FC

== Quarterfinals ==
[Apr 18-22]

Génération Foot 3-0 CSAD de Dakar

AS Douanes 0-0 Jamono Fatick [2-3 pen]

NGB Niary Tally 0-1 Renaissance Dakar

Kawral de Vélingara 2-0 Teungueth FC [aet]

== Semifinals ==
[May 10?]

Génération Foot 4-0 Kawral de Vélingara

Renaissance de Dakar 4-2 Jamono Fatick

== Final ==
[May 20]

Génération Foot 2-0 Renaissance Dakar

== See also ==
- 2017–18 Senegal Premier League
