= Hotel Oran Bay =

Hotel in Oran, Algeria

Hotel Oran Bay, Managed by Accor
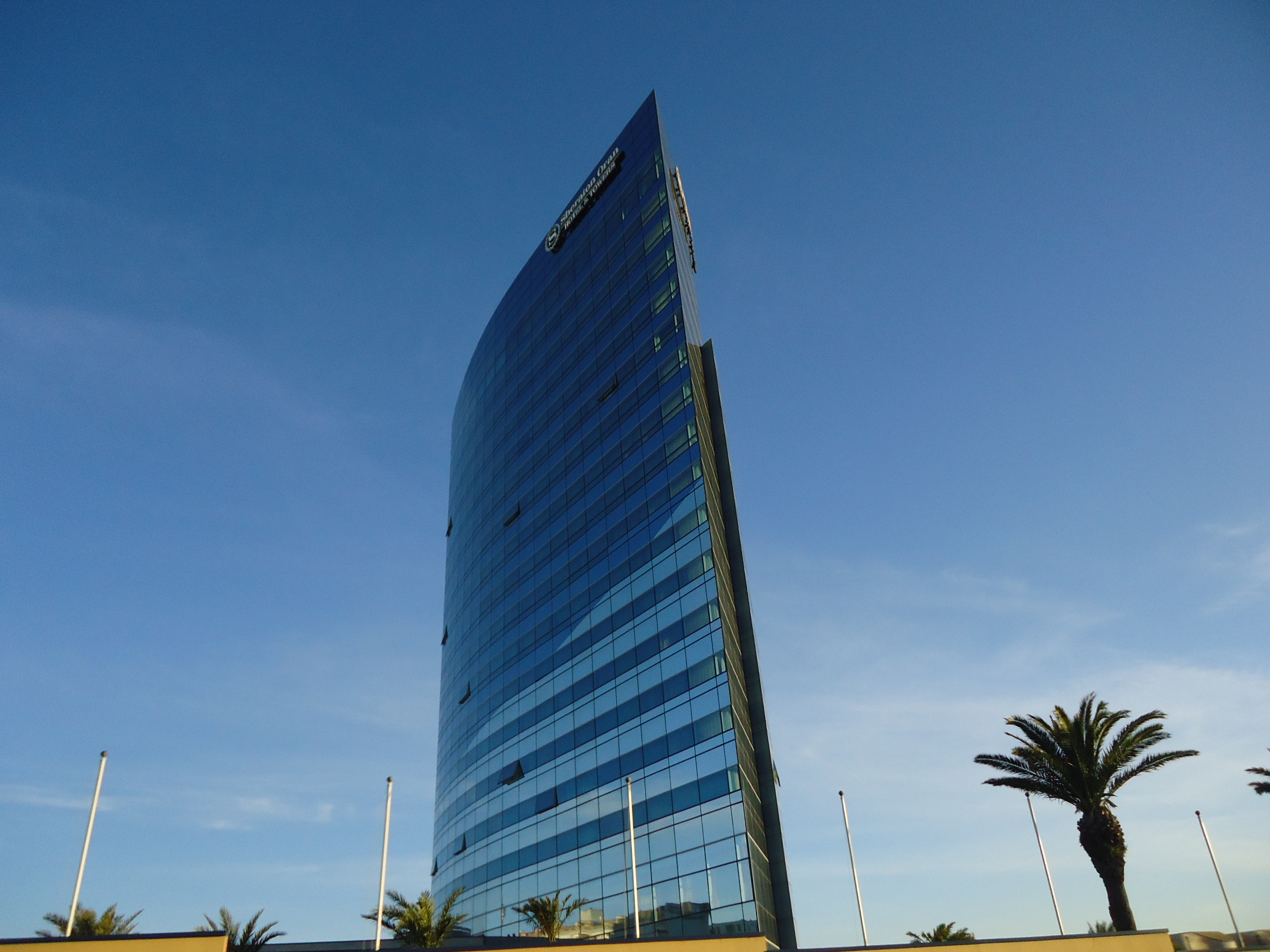
- Interactive map of the Hotel Oran Bay, Managed by Accor area

General information
- Type: Hotel
- Location: Using slopes Knstal Street; Oran, Algeria
- Coordinates: 35.7151°N 0.6093°W
- Opening: 8 September 2005
- Cost: USD96.53 million
- Owner: The Ministry of Tourism and Traditional Industries
- Operator: Accor

Height
- Antenna spire: N/A
- Roof: 77 metres (253 ft)

Technical details
- Floor count: 19

Design and construction
- Architect: Fabris & Partners
- Developer: Group of Civil Engineering of the Government of China

Other information
- Number of rooms: 321
- Number of suites: 42

Website
- {{URL|example.com|optional display text}}

References
- Skyscraper Page

The Hotel Oran Bay, Managed by Accor, is a luxury five-star hotel in Oran, Algeria.

== History ==
The hotel opened on 8 September 2005 as the Sheraton Oran Hotel and Towers. It left Sheraton and joined Accor in 2021. The hotel is currently unbranded, but is set to be reflagged as a Pullman after renovations.

== Facilities ==
The hotel contains 321 rooms, 39 suites and 1 presidential suite. It contains a banquet centre with 3 ballrooms, each measuring 820 square metres. The hotel is served by Le Ciel d'Oran and El Andalus serving Spanish and Oriental cuisine, Canastal Brasserie and Le pub Bar which serves British Cuisine.

== Gallery ==
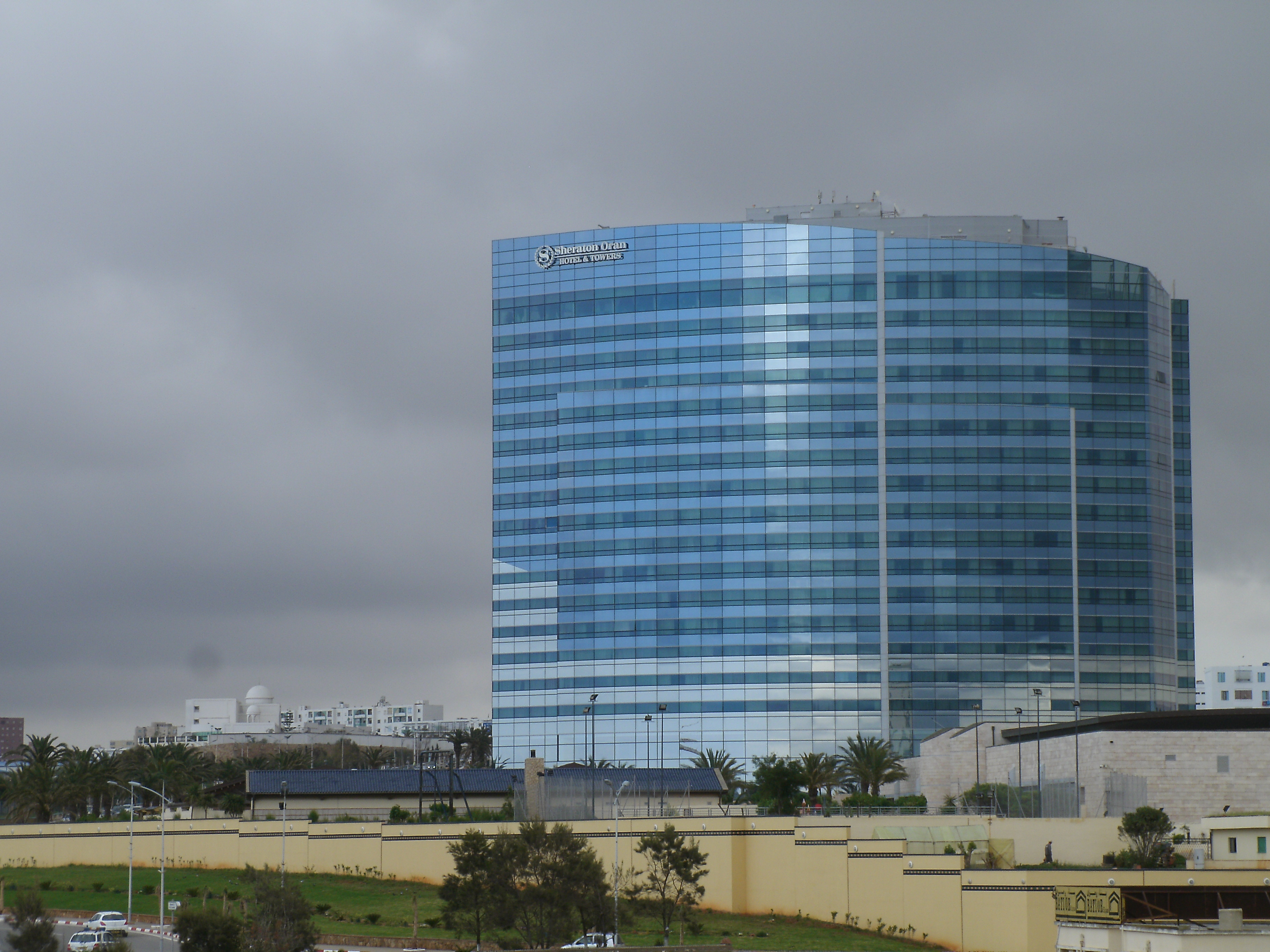

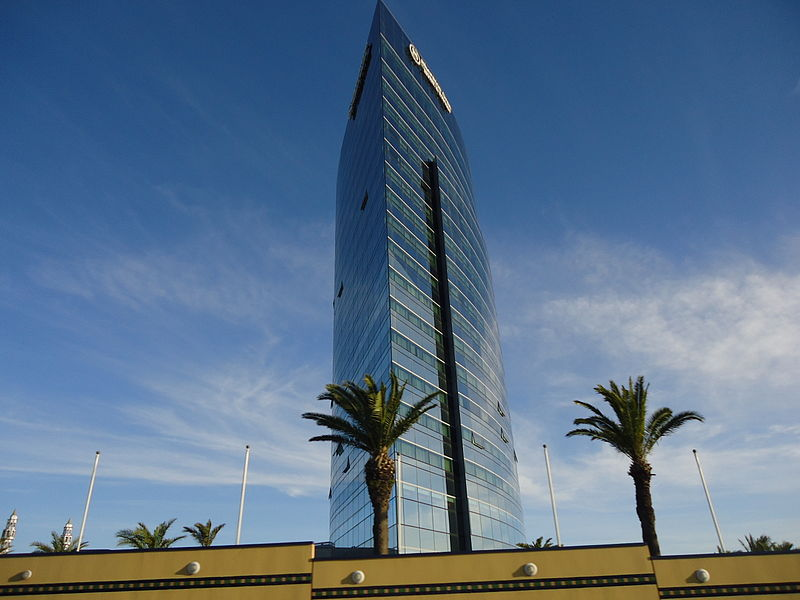
