= Ando Rakotondrazaka =

Malagasy footballer (born 1987)

Personal information
- Full name: Andoniaina Rakotondrazaka Andrianavalona
- Date of birth: 25 September 1987 (age 39)
- Position: Midfielder

Team information
- Current team: CNaPS Sport

Senior career*
Years	Team	Apps	(Gls)
2011	CNaPS Sport		
2012–2014	Ajesaia		
2015–	CNaPS Sport		

International career^{‡}
2017–	Madagascar	21	(0)
- * Club domestic league appearances and goals as of 12:14, 18 October 2018 (UTC) ‡ National team caps and goals as of 09:51, 2 February 2020 (UTC)

Andoniaina Rakotondrazaka Andrianavalona (born 25 September 1987) is a Malagasy international footballer who plays for CNaPS Sport, as a midfielder.

== Career ==
He has played club football for CNaPS Sport and Ajesaia.

He made his international debut for Madagascar in 2017.
