= Adamou Djibo =

Nigerien footballer

Personal information
- Full name: Adamou Ibrahim Djibo
- Date of birth: 13 August 1998 (age 28)
- Height: 1.78 m (5 ft 10 in)
- Position: Defender

Team information
- Current team: US GN

Senior career*
| Years | Team | Apps | (Gls) |
| 2017–2020 | Sahel | | |
| 2021–2023 | ASN Nigelec | | |
| 2023–2024 | Sheriff Tiraspol | 3 | (0) |
| 2025– | US GN | | |

International career^{‡}
| 2021– | Niger | 14 | (0) |
- * Club domestic league appearances and goals as of 31 August 2024 ‡ National team caps and goals as of 9 February 2024

Adamou Ibrahim Djibo (born 13 August 1998) is a Nigerien professional footballer who plays as a defender for US GN.

== Club career ==
On 12 June 2023, Sheriff Tiraspol Sheriff announced the signing of Djibo from ASN Nigelec.

== Career statistics ==
=== International ===
As of match played 17 October 2023

| National team | Year | Apps | Goals |
|---|---|---|---|
| Niger | 2021 | 2 | 0 |
| Niger | 2022 | 3 | 0 |
| Niger | 2023 | 9 | 0 |
| Total | | 14 | 0 |
