= Abdoul Aziz Ibrahim =

Nigerien footballer

Personal information
- Date of birth: 15 March 1996 (age 30)
- Height: 1.86 m (6 ft 1 in)
- Position: Winger

Team information
- Current team: Nigelec

Senior career*
Years	Team	Apps	(Gls)
2011–2013	Olympic		
2013–2019	GNN		
2019–	Nigelec		

International career^{‡}
2019–	Niger	7	(1)
- * Club domestic league appearances and goals as of 26 April 2021 ‡ National team caps and goals as of 26 April 2021

Abdoul Aziz Ibrahim (born 15 March 1996) is a Nigerien professional footballer who plays as a winger for Nigelec.
