= Marcio Ravelomanantsoa =

Malagasy footballer

Personal information
- Full name: Marcio Carlos Ravelomanantsoa
- Date of birth: 15 October 1996 (age 30)
- Place of birth: Toliara, Madagascar
- Position: Forward

Team information
- Current team: JET Kintana

Senior career*
Years	Team	Apps	(Gls)
2016	Fomboni FC		
2017–2021	AS JET Mada		
2021–	JET Kintana		

International career
2018–	Madagascar	6	(0)
- * Club domestic league appearances and goals

Marcio Ravelomanantsoa (born 15 October 1996) is a Malagasy football striker who currently plays for JET Kintana.

== Honours ==
Madagascar

- African Nations Championship third place: 2022
