= Miloud Hadefi Stadium =

Stadium in Oran, Algeria

- ملعب ميلود هدفي
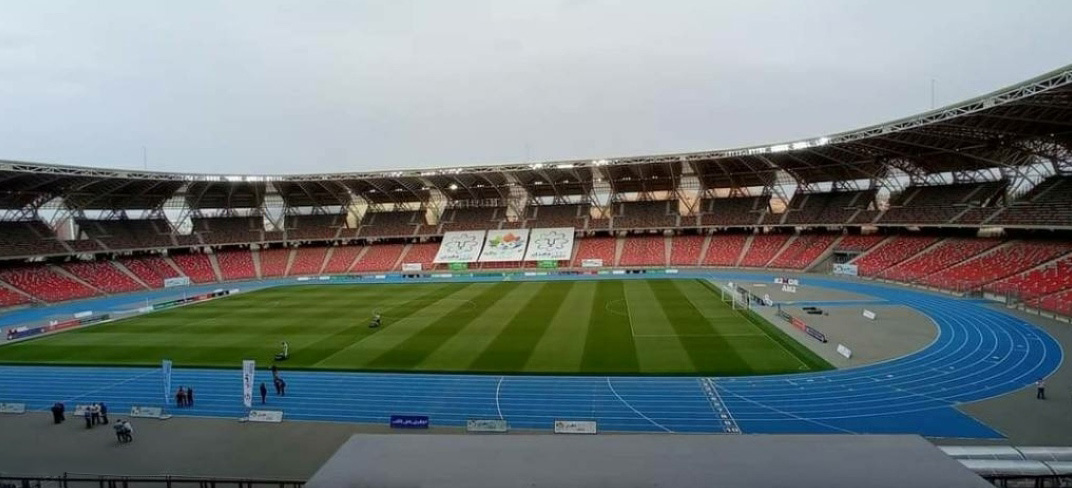
- Interior view
- Interactive map of Miloud Hadefi Stadium
- Full name: Miloud Hadefi Stadium
- Former names: Olympic Stadium of Oran
- Location: Belgaïd, Bir El Djir; Oran, Algeria
- Coordinates: 35°43′42.3″N 0°32′57.4″W
- Owner: Ministry of Youth and Sport
- Operator: Ministry of Youth and Sport
- Capacity: 40,143
- Surface: AirFibr (hybrid grass)
- Record attendance: 45,000 France-Italy (4 July 2022)
- Field size: 105 by 68 metres (115 by 74 yd)

Construction
- Groundbreaking: 1 June 2010
- Built: 2010–2021
- Opened: 17 June 2021; 5 years ago
- Cost: 142,3 million US$
- Main contractor: China Metallurgical Group Corporation

Tenants
- MC Oran (2021–present); Algeria (selected matches)

Miloud Hadefi Stadium (Arabic: ملعب ميلود هدفي), is a multi-use stadium in Belgaïd, in the Bir El Djir suburb of Oran, Algeria. Completed in 2019, it is used mostly for football matches. It can hold 40,143 spectators. The value of construction work of the stadium was about 142.3 million US$, it is an olympic stadium with the athletics track and it is a part of the Miloud Hadefi Olympic Complex which is the first big complex in Algeria exceeding the Mohamed Boudiaf Olympic Complex in Algiers and it is also the first stadium entirely covered in Algeria. The stadium expected to be special for the Algeria national football team with Stade du 5 Juillet and Nelson Mandela Stadium, and also clubs of Oran especially MC Oran.

The Miloud Hadefi Stadium and all the complex which extends over a total area of 105 hectares, including all the infrastructure essential to the organization of international sports and football events. The stadium was used as the opening and closing ceremony venue of the 2022 Mediterranean Games. The inaugural match of the stadium was held on 17 June 2021, when Algeria beat Liberia 5–1 in a friendly game.

== Stadium ==
=== Characteristics ===
The stadium has been inspired by the San Nicola Stadium in Bari, built in 1990, which was designed by the Italian architect Renzo Piano.

=== Construction ===
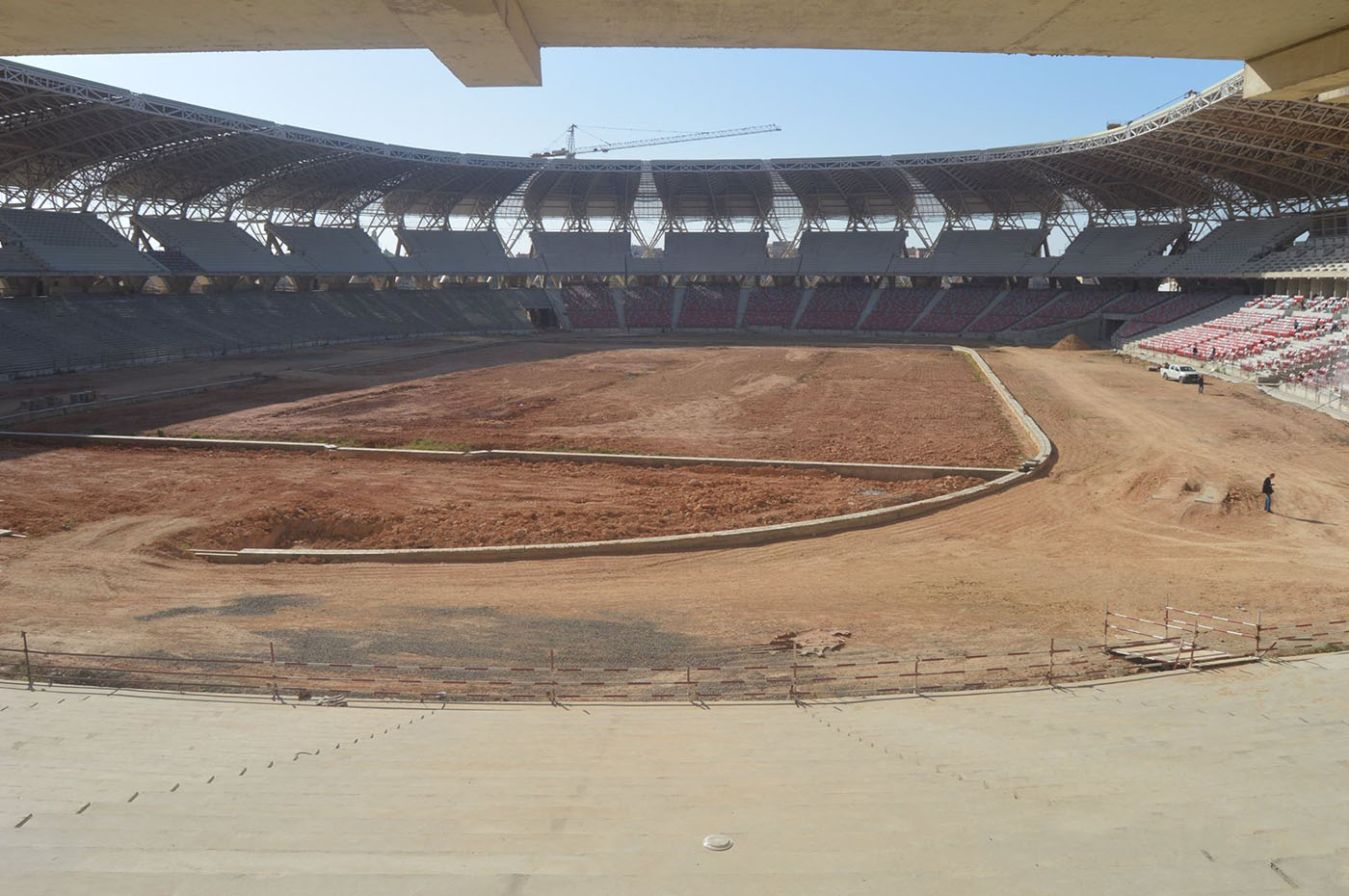
Stadium under construction

On 20 December 2006 planned the project of construction of the Olympic Complex. The stadium was planned for a capacity of 75,000 seats but was reduced to 40.000. On 5 December 2011 the minister of Youth and Sports, El Hachemi Djiar, announced that the stadium would be completed before the end of 2012. He also added that the entire project would be finished in 2015. But due to delays in construction work, the complex was finished in 2019.

=== Name of the stadium ===
In 2014, M. Mohamed Raouraoua president of the Algerian Football Federation suggested that the olympic stadium can take the name of the former legendary footballer of MC Oran and of the national team Abdelkader Fréha. Some other names were suggested like the other former legendary footballer Miloud Hadefi. Finally he kept the name of Miloud Hadefi Stadium.

=== Name of the olympic complex ===
At the beginning of June 2022, the olympic complex was named Benhaddou Bouhadjar aka Colonel Othmane Olympic Complex. But on 23 June 2022, the complex was inaugurated and renamed by President Abdelmadjid Tebboune in the name of the former international footballer and of MC Oran, Miloud Hadefi and therefore became the Miloud Hadefi Olympic Complex.

== Tenants and events ==
The Olympic Stadium hosted the some events :

- 2022 Mediterranean Games from 25 June till 5 July 2022.
- 2022 African Nations Championship from 16 January till 3 February 2022.
- 2025 Arab Athletics Championships from 30 April till 4 May 2025.

== Transport connections ==
The stadium is part of the Oran Olympic complex that is situated just 5 minutes away from several bus stations and the Oran Tramway final destination stop that makes travelling to the stadium very easy from all regions of Oran.

== Football matches ==
The stadium host national and international matches. It was inaugurated by a friendly international game between Algeria A' and Liberia on 17 June 2021.

Club matches

21 March 2023 2023 Arab Club Champions Cup – 1st qualifying round	JS Saoura (Algeria)	1–1	Kuwait SC	Bir El Djir, Oran
18:00 UTC+1	Doucene 76'		Khenissi 64'	Stadium: Miloud Hadefi Stadium; Attendance: 10,000; Referee: Dahane Beida (Mauritania)

26 May 2023 2022–23 Algerian Cup – semi-finals	JS Saoura (Algeria)	1–3	(Algeria) ASO Chlef	Bir El Djir, Oran
18:00 UTC+1	Hammia 75' (pen.)		Souibaâh 13'; Aliane 46'; Fettouhi 51'	Stadium: Miloud Hadefi Stadium; Attendance: 15,000; Referee: Mustapha Ghorbal

22 June 2023 2022–23 Algerian Cup – final	ASO Chlef (Algeria)	2–1 (a.e.t.)	(Algeria) CR Belouizdad	Bir El Djir, Oran
17:00 UTC+1	Addadi 67'; Morsli 94'		Wamba 8' (pen.)	Stadium: Miloud Hadefi Stadium; Attendance: 25,000; Referee: Lahlou Benbraham

23 September 2023 2023–24 Ligue Pro. 1 – 2nd day	MC Oran (Algeria)	1–1	(Algeria) JS Saoura	Bir El Djir, Oran
19:00 UTC+1	Benamara 36'		Bellatreche 5' (pen.)	Stadium: Miloud Hadefi Stadium; Attendance: 3,793; Referee: Youcef Gamouh

International events and matches

17 June 2021 Friendly (inauguration of the stadium)	Algeria A'	5–1	Liberia	Bir El Djir, Oran
21:00 UTC+01:00	Amoura 39', 41', 47', 67'; Messaoudi 84' (pen.)		Dorley 24'	Stadium: Miloud Hadefi Stadium; Attendance: 0 (closed door); Referee: Mutaz Ibrahim Al-Shalmani (Libya)

4 July 2022 2022 Mediterranean Games – third place match	Turkey U18	2–4	Morocco U18	Bir El Djir, Oran
17:00 UTC+01:00	Biçer 15', 58'	Report	Anhari 45+1'; Raihani 47'; Maurer 73'; Sadik 86'	Stadium: Miloud Hadefi Stadium; Referee: Bruno José Costa (Portugal)

4 July 2022 2022 Mediterranean Games – final	France U18	1–0	Italy U18	Bir El Djir, Oran
20:45 UTC+01:00	Pirringuel 68'	Report		Stadium: Miloud Hadefi Stadium; Attendance: 25,000 (officially); 45,000; Referee: Lotfi Bekouassa (Algeria)

29 September 2022 Friendly	Algeria A'	2–0	Sudan A'	Bir El Djir, Oran
20:00 UTC+1	Meziane 1'; Mahious 77'			Stadium: Miloud Hadefi Stadium; Attendance: 0 (closed door); Referee: Mehrez Melki (Tunisia)

16 January 2023 2022 CHAN – group D	Mali A'	3–3	Angola A'	Bir El Djir, Oran
17:00	Sinayoko 23'; Diaby 79'; Coulibaly 83'	Report	Depú 12', 26'; Gilberto 72'	Stadium: Miloud Hadefi Stadium; Referee: Karim Sabry (Morocco)

16 January 2023 2022 CHAN – group E	Cameroon A'	1–0	Congo A'	Bir El Djir, Oran
20:00	Mbekeli 63'	Report		Stadium: Miloud Hadefi Stadium; Referee: Abdelaziz Bouh (Mauritania)

20 January 2023 2022 CHAN – group D	Angola A'	0–0	Mauritania A'	Bir El Djir, Oran
17:00		Report		Stadium: Miloud Hadefi Stadium; Referee: Djindo Louis Hougnandande (Benin)

20 January 2023 2022 CHAN – group E	Congo A'	0–0	Niger A'	Bir El Djir, Oran
20:00		Report		Stadium: Miloud Hadefi Stadium; Referee: Daouda Gueye (Senegal)

24 January 2023 2022 CHAN – group D	Mauritania A'	1–0	Mali A'	Bir El Djir, Oran
17:00	Sy 53'	Report		Stadium: Miloud Hadefi Stadium; Attendance: 4,389; Referee: Mohamed Adel (Egypt)

24 January 2023 2022 CHAN – group E	Niger A'	1–0	Cameroon A'	Bir El Djir, Oran
20:00	Badamassi 69'	Report		Stadium: Miloud Hadefi Stadium; Referee: Celso Armindo Alvação (Mozambique)

28 January 2023 2022 CHAN – quarter-final	Niger A'	2–0	Ghana A'	Bir El Djir, Oran
20:00	Yiadom 11' (o.g.); Haïnikoye 49'	Report		Stadium: Miloud Hadefi Stadium; Referee: = Samuel Uwikunda (Rwanda)

31 January 2023 2022 CHAN – semi-final	Algeria A'	5–0	Niger A'	Bir El Djir, Oran
17:00	Abdellaoui 15'; Mahious 24', 34'; Katakoré 45' (o.g.); Bayazid 83'	Report		Stadium: Miloud Hadefi Stadium; Attendance: 39,000; Referee: Tom Abongile (South Africa)

3 February 2023 2022 CHAN – third place match	Niger A'	0–1	Madagascar A'	Bir El Djir, Oran
20:00		Report	Razafindrakoto 90'	Stadium: Miloud Hadefi Stadium; Referee: Mohamed Adel (Egypt)

14 October 2025 2026 FIFA WC qualification	Somalia	0–1	Mozambique	Bir El Djir, Oran (Note: Somalia chose to play at the Miloud Hadefi Stadium in Oran, Algeria due to the non-qualification of its stadium.)
17:00 UTC+1			Catamo 6'	Stadium: Miloud Hadefi Stadium; Referee: Ahmed Abdulrazg (Libya)

Women's international events and matches

26 September 2023 2024 WafconQ 1st round 2nd leg	Algeria	1–1	Uganda	Bir El Djir, Oran, Algeria
19:00 UTC+1	Bouhenni 5'		Najjemba 67' (pen.)	Stadium: Miloud Hadefi Stadium; Referee: Chahenda El Maghribi (Egypt)

23 October 2025 2026 WafconQ 2nd round 1st leg	Algeria	v	Cameroon	Bir El Djir, Oran, Algeria
19:00 UTC+1	Karchouni 23'; Dafeur 35'		Nchout 90+4' (pen.)	Stadium: Miloud Hadefi Stadium; Referee: Awa Ilboudo (Burkina Faso)

Algeria NT matches

23 September 2022 Friendly	Algeria	1–0	Guinea	Bir El Djir, Oran, Algeria
20:00 UTC+1	Slimani 79'			Stadium: Miloud Hadefi Stadium; Attendance: 40 000; Referee: Beida Dahane (Mauritania)

27 September 2022 Friendly	Algeria	2–1	Nigeria	Bir El Djir, Oran, Algeria
20:00 UTC+1	Mahrez 42' (pen.); Atal 61'	Report	Moffi 9'	Stadium: Miloud Hadefi Stadium; Attendance: 40 000; Referee: Mehrez Melki (Tunisia)

16 November 2022 Friendly	Algeria	1–1	Mali	Bir El Djir, Oran, Algeria
20:30 UTC+1	Mahrez 45+3' (pen.)		Haïdara 58'	Stadium: Miloud Hadefi Stadium; Attendance: 20 000; Referee: Amir Lousif (Tunisia)

5 September 2024 2025 AFCON qualification	Algeria	2–0	Equatorial Guinea	Bir El Djir, Oran, Algeria
20:00 UTC+1	Aouar 69'; Gouiri 90+5'			Stadium: Miloud Hadefi Stadium; Attendance: 40 000; Referee: Djindo Louis Houngnandande (Benin)

9 October 2025 2026 FIFA WC qualification	Somalia	0–3	Algeria	Bir El Djir, Oran, Algeria
17:00 UTC+1			Amoura 7', 57'; Mahrez 19'	Stadium: Miloud Hadefi Stadium; Attendance: 40,000; Referee: Godfrey Nkhakananga (Malawi)

== See also ==
- List of football stadiums in Algeria
- List of African stadiums by capacity
- List of association football stadiums by capacity
- Miloud Hadefi Complex Omnisport Arena
- Miloud Hadefi Complex Aquatic Center
- Ahmed Zabana Stadium

== Notes and references ==
=== References ===
Events
Preceded by Nou Estadi de Tarragona; Tarragona	Mediterranean Games; Main Venue; 2022	Succeeded by Stadio Erasmo Iacovone; Taranto
Preceded by Khalifa International Stadium; Doha	Arab Games; Main Venue; 2023	Succeeded by King Fahd International Stadium; Riyadh
