= Konadu Yiadom =

Ghanaian professional footballer

Personal information
- Date of birth: 10 June 2000 (age 26)
- Place of birth: Ghana
- Height: 1.91 m (6 ft 3 in)
- Position: Defender

Team information
- Current team: Hapoel Kfar Saba
- Number: 25

Senior career*
Years	Team	Apps	(Gls)
2018–2022	WAFA	89	(5)
2022–2025	Hearts of Oak	36	(3)
2023–2024	→ Kryvbas Kryvyi Rih (loan)	0	(0)
2025–	Hapoel Kfar Saba	26	(1)
- * Club domestic league appearances and goals as of 24 June 2026

Konadu Yiadom (born 10 June 2000) is a Ghanaian professional footballer who plays as defender for Israeli club Hapoel Kfar Saba.

== Career ==
=== Early career ===
Yiadom started his career with lower-tier side Tema United, in the harbor city of Tema in the Greater Accra Region of Ghana before joining WAFA in 2018.

=== WAFA ===
In January 2018, Yiadom joined West African Football Academy on a three-year deal after Ibrahim Abukari suffered an injury and was immediately promoted into the senior team. He made his debut on 2 May 2018, in a 2–1 victory to Berekum Chelsea. He made 5 league appearances in his debut season. The next season, the 2019 GFA Normalization Special Competition, he played 7 out of 12 league matches. The following season, the 2019–20 season, he played in 14 league matches and scored 2 goals before the league was suspended and later halted due to restrictions from the outbreak of the COVID-19 pandemic in Ghana.
