= Mohamed Adel (referee) =

Egyptian football referee

- Full name: Mohamed Adel Hussein
- Born: 25 July 1978 (age 48); Cairo, Egypt
- Other occupation: Police officer

Domestic
Years	League	Role
2012–	Egyptian Second Division	Referee
2013–	Egyptian Premier League	Referee

International
Years	League	Role
2018–	FIFA listed	Referee

Mohamed Adel Hussein (Arabic: محمد عادل حسين; born 25 July 1978) is an Egyptian football referee.

Adel became a FIFA referee in 2018. He has served as a referee at the 2018–19 CAF Champions League.

Adel is police officer and is a member of the Egyptian National Police.
