= List of football stadiums in Uganda =

This is a list of football stadiums in Uganda, ranked in descending order of capacity. There is a high volume of football stadiums and pitches in Uganda, and a definitive list of stadiums would be difficult to produce. This list, therefore, is limited to stadiums that meet one of the following criteria based on current capacity:

- Used for football and have a capacity larger than 1,500.

== Current stadiums ==
#	Images	Stadium	Capacity	City	RF
1		Mandela National Stadium	64,125	Bweyogerere, Kampala	
2		Nakivubo War Memorial Grounds	35,000	Kampala	
3		Akii Bua Stadium (New stadium)	20,000	Lira	
4		Hoima City Stadium	20,000	Hoima	
5		St. Mary's Stadium-Kitende	20,000	Wakiso	
6		Masaka Sports Stadium (New stadium)	15,000	Masaka	
7		Mutesa II Stadium	8,000	Kampala	
8		Lugogo Stadium	8,000	Kampala	
9		Bunamwaya Stadium	5,000	Wakiso Town	
10		Kakyeka Stadium	1,500	Mbarara	

== See also ==
- Lists of stadiums
- List of association football stadiums by capacity
- List of African stadiums by capacity
- Football in Uganda
