= 2026–27 Uganda Premier League =

Football season in Uganda

Uganda Premier League
- Season: 2026–27

The 2026–27 Uganda Premier League (known as the StarTimes Uganda Premier League for sponsorship reasons) is the 59th season of the Uganda Premier League, the top-tier football league in Uganda. The season started on 28 August 2026.

== Teams ==
The league expanded from 16 to 18 teams, fourteen from the previous season and 4 teams promoted from the FUFA Big League.

=== Promotion and relegation ===
▲ Promoted from 2025–26 FUFA Big League	▼ Relegated to 2026–27 FUFA Big League
Blacks Power FC; Ntugasaze FC; Kataka FC; Kigezi Homeboys	Buhimba Saints; Calvary

=== Stadiums and locations ===
Ten stadia were approved to host Premier League matches and since they are 18 teams, some venues will be shared for the first round of matches.

Stadium	Location	Capacity	Club(s)
MTN Omondi Stadium	Kampala (Lugogo)	10,000	KCCA FC, NEC FC
Hamz Stadium	Kampala (Nakivubo)	35,000	Entebbe UPPC, Express FC, UPDF, URA
Hoima City Stadium	Hoima	20,000	Blacks Power SC, Kitara FC
Mutesa II Stadium	Kampala (Wankulukuku)		Maroons, SC Villa
St. Mary's Stadium	Kitende	20,000	Vipers
Kira Road Police Arena	Kampala (Kamwokya)	5,000	Ntugasaze FC, Police
Bukedea Comprehensive Sports Complex	Bukedea	10,000	Kataka FC
Rwamwanja Stadium	Kamwenge	5,000	Kigezi Homeboys, Mbarara City
Lugazi FC Stadium	Lugazi		Lugazi FC
FUFA Technical Centre	Njeru	3,000	BUL FC

== League table ==
Pos	Team	Pld	W	D	L	GF	GA	GD	Pts	Qualification or relegation
1	BUL FC	3	3	0	0	9	2	+7	9	Qualification for CAF Champions League
2	Blacks Power FC	3	3	0	0	4	1	+3	9	
3	SC Villa	3	2	1	0	4	1	+3	7	
4	NEC	2	2	0	0	5	1	+4	6	
5	Entebbe UPPC	3	2	0	1	3	2	+1	6	
6	Lugazi	3	2	0	1	4	4	0	6	
7	Maroons	3	1	0	2	5	5	0	3	
8	URA	2	1	0	1	2	2	0	3	
9	Police	2	1	0	1	4	4	0	3	
10	Express	3	1	0	2	2	3	−1	3	
11	UPDF	3	0	2	1	1	2	−1	2	
12	Kitara	1	0	1	0	1	1	0	1	
13	Kigezi Homeboys	2	0	1	1	1	2	−1	1	
14	Mbarara City	2	0	1	1	0	1	−1	1	
15	Kataka FC	2	0	1	1	1	4	−3	1	Relegation to FUFA Big League
16	KCCA	3	0	1	2	0	4	−4	1	Relegation to FUFA Big League
17	Vipers	1	0	0	1	0	1	−1	0	Relegation to FUFA Big League
18	Ntugasaze FC	3	0	0	3	2	8	−6	0	Relegation to FUFA Big League

Updated to match(es) played on 11 September 2026. Source: Uganda Premier League, Sofascore,
Rules for classification: 1) points; 2) goal difference; 3) goals scored; 4) head-to-head points; 5) head-to-head goal difference; 6) head-to-head goals scored; 7) playoff

== Results ==
Each team plays each other twice (34 matches each), once at home and once away.

Home \ Away	BLA	BUL	ENT	EXP	KAT	KCC	KGH	KIT	LUG	MAR	MBA	NEC	NTU	POL	UPD	URA	SCV	VIP
Blacks Power FC	—												1–0	1–0				
Bul		—		1–0									4–1					
Entebbe UPPC			—						0–1						2–1			
Express				—		2–0												
Kataka FC		1–4			—													
KCCA						—						0–2						
Kigezi Homeboys FC						0–0	—											
Kitara								—										
Lugazi									—									
Maroons	1–2									—						1–2		
Mbarara City											—	0–0						
NEC									3–1			—						
Ntugasaze FC										1–3			—					
Police											1–0			—	0–0			
UPDF FC					0–0										—			
URA																—	0–1	
SC Villa				2–0				1–1									—	
Vipers			0–1															—

Updated to match(es) played on 9 September 2026. Source: Uganda Premier League
Legend: Blue = home team win; Yellow = draw; Red = away team win.
