= Akii Bua Stadium =

Under construction stadium in Lira, Uganda

- Location within Uganda
- Location: Lira City, Northern Region, Uganda
- Coordinates: 02°15′02″N 32°54′02″E
- Owner: Government of Uganda
- Capacity: 20,000 (expected)
- Surface: GrassMaster
- Field size: 115 yd × 74 yd (105 m × 68 m)

Construction
- Built: 2024–2026 (expected)
- Opened: October 2026 (expected)
- Cost: USh470 billion (US$129 million)
- Architect: ElRaeid Engineering Consultants Egypt
- Main contractor: SAMCO National Construction Company of Egypt

Tenant
- 2027 Africa Cup of Nations

The Akii Bua Stadium, also Akii-Bua Stadium, is a multi-purpose stadium under construction in Lira, Uganda. It is intended to be used for the first time, during the 2027 Africa Cup of Nations soccer tournament. The stadium is one of the three stadia that Uganda plans to use during the tournament, that will be jointly hosted by Kenya, Tanzania and Uganda.

== Location ==
The stadium is located in the city of Lira, Uganda, in Lango sub-region, in the Northern Region of Uganda. The proposed stadium will sit on a piece of real estate in the city centre referred to as the John Akii Bua Playground, measuring approximately 18.455 hectares (45.60 acres). The geographical coordinates of the stadium are: 2°15'02.0"N, 32°54'02.0"E (Latitude:2.250556; Longitude:32.900556).

== Overview ==
The stadium is named after John Akii-Bua (3 December 1949 – 20 June 1997), a native son who was the winner of the gold medal at the 1972 Summer Olympics in the 400 metres hurdles with a then world record time of 47.82 seconds. The primary purpose of this stadium is to be part of the three host stadia that Uganda will use to host the 2027 Africa Cup of Nations in a tri-state-host tournament to be held in the East African countries of Kenya, Tanzania and Uganda. The stadium is mainly intended for soccer matches, although other sports such as athletics are also expected to be practiced here.

In September 2023, the Confederation of African Football (CAF), announced the East Africa Pamoja bid by Kenya, Uganda and Tanzania as the winning bid to host the 2027 AFCON tournament. The bid beat out other bids by other countries including Algeria, Egypt, Botswana, Senegal and Nigeria.

At the bidding stage FUFA nominated Namboole Stadium, in metropolitan Kampala, Bihanga Stadium in Fort Portal, Akii Bua Stadium in Lira City and the then proposed Hoima Sports Stadium in Hoima City. Training grounds proposed include Kampala International School Uganda (KISU), Nakivubo Stadium, Muteesa II Stadium, in Wankulukuku, Denver Godwin Stadium and St. Mary's Stadium Kitende.

== Construction ==
The engineering, procurement and construction (EPC) contract was awarded to a joint venture company comprising SAMCO National Construction Company (Samco Egypt) and Khater Sport. The design consultant is ElRaeid Engineering Consultants, also of Egypt. The EPC contractor will fund the construction and be paid at or after commercial commissioning. As of March 2024, the contractor is waiting for a water source, electricity connection, a suitable road to the site and a signed EPC contract before beginning work. This is after the government of China withdrew its offer to fund Akii Bua Stadium in Lira and Buhinga Stadium in Fort Portal, in March 2023. Construction is expected to start in Q4 2024.

In December 2024, the EPC contract was signed in Kampala, between the government of Uganda and SAMCO National Construction Company. The construction cost is budgeted at $129 million (approx. USh 470 billion). Building the stadium is expected to last 20 months.

In 2025, the Turkish engineering company Polarkon was subcontracted to undertake the steel space frame roof and façade construction of the stadium. The scope covers approximately 30,000 m², including large-span steel space frame systems designed and manufactured in Ankara, Turkey. Prior to fabrication, officials from the Ministry of Uganda, SAMCO National Construction Company, and F.S.C visited Polarkon’s facilities for detailed inspections of production and quality processes. In August 2025, the National Council for Sports visited the stadium to check on the progress of the construction of the stadium.

== See also ==
- List of African stadiums by capacity
- List of stadiums in Africa
