= 2023–24 Uganda Premier League =

Football season in Uganda

Uganda Premier League
- Season: 2023–24
- Dates: 15 September 2023 – 25 May 2024
- Champions: SC Villa
- Relegated: Busoga United; Gadafi
- Champions League: SC Villa
- Confederation Cup: Vipers
- Top goalscorer: Muhammad Shaban (17 goals)

The 2023–24 Uganda Premier League was the 56th season of the Uganda Premier League, the top-tier football league in Uganda.

== League changes ==
Kitara, Mbarara City and NEC were promoted from the 2022–23 FUFA Big League.

Arua Hill's license was suspended by FUFA after the first half of fixtures for failing to meet licensing requirements.

== Participating teams ==
The 2023–24 Uganda Premier League is being contested by 16 teams.

Locations of the Uganda Premier League clubs

Club	Settlement	Stadium	Capacity
Arua Hill	Arua	Arua Hill Stadium	20,000
Bright Stars	Kampala	Mwererwe Stadium / Muteesa II Stadium	5,000 / 20,200
BUL Jinja	Jinja	Kakindu Municipal Stadium / Bugembe Stadium	1,000
Busoga United	Jinja	Kakindu Municipal Stadium	1,000
Express	Kampala	Muteesa II Stadium	20,200
Gaddafi	Jinja	Gaddafi Barracks	1,000
Kampala Capital City Authority	Kampala	Star Times Stadium, Lugogo [5]	3,000
Kitara	Hoima	Masindi Municipal Stadium	
Maroons	Kampala	Luzira Prisons Stadium	1,000
Mbarara City	Mbarara	Kakyeka Stadium	2,000
National Enterprises Corporation	Bugolobi	MTN Omondi stadium	
Uganda People's Defence Force	Bombo	Bombo Stadium	1,000
SC Villa	Kampala	Nakivubo Stadium	15,000
Uganda Revenue Authority	Kampala	Lugazi Stadium	2,000
Vipers	Kampala	St. Mary's Stadium-Kitende	2,000
Wakiso Giants	Wakiso	Wakisha Stadium (under renovations)	2,000

Some of the Kampala clubs may on occasions also play home matches at the Mandela National Stadium.

== League table ==
Pos	Team	Pld	W	D	L	GF	GA	GD	Pts	Qualification or relegation
1	Villa (C, Q)	29	16	9	4	40	21	+19	57	Qualification for Champions League
2	Vipers (Q)	29	16	8	5	45	20	+25	56	Qualification for Confederation Cup
3	BUL	29	16	8	5	36	17	+19	56	
4	Kitara	29	16	6	7	46	24	+22	54	
5	Kampala Capital City Authority	29	15	4	10	54	33	+21	49	
6	National Enterprises Corporation	29	14	6	9	35	34	+1	48	
7	Maroons	29	10	11	8	35	26	+9	41	
8	Uganda Revenue Authority	29	10	10	9	30	27	+3	40	
9	Bright Stars	29	7	15	7	33	33	0	36	
10	Express	29	9	5	15	36	38	−2	32	
11	Mbarara City	29	6	14	9	22	29	−7	32	
12	Wakiso Giants	29	9	5	15	27	42	−15	32	
13	UPDF	29	7	6	16	23	39	−16	27	
14	Busoga United (R)	29	6	7	16	25	53	−28	25	Relegation to FUFA Big League
15	Gaddafi (R)	29	7	4	18	24	54	−30	25	Relegation to FUFA Big League
16	Arua Hill	15	1	2	12	12	33	−21	5	Withdrew

Source: UPL
Rules for classification: 1) points; 2) goal difference; 3) goals scored; 4) head-to-head points; 5) head-to-head goal difference; 6) head-to-head goals scored; 7) playoff
(C) Champions; (Q) Qualified for the phase indicated; (R) Relegated

== Attendances ==
#	Football club	Average attendance
1	Vipers SC	5,318
2	KCCA FC	2,235
3	Kitara FC	888
4	Wakiso Giants FC	780
5	SC Villa	708
6	Gaddafi FC	688
7	Busoga United FC	657
8	Express FC	440
9	Arua Hill SC	494
10	NEC FC	384
11	Maroons FC	282
12	URA FC	280
13	Mbarara City FC	228
14	UPDF FC	213
15	BUL Jinja FC	204
16	Bright Stars FC	142
