= Dan Birikwalira =

Ugandan Footballer

Personal information
- Full name: Dan Birikwalira
- Date of birth: January 5, 1996 (age 30)
- Place of birth: Mukono, Uganda
- Height: 1.57 m (5 ft 2 in)
- Position: Left-back

Team information
- Current team: Gaddafi FC

Senior career*
Years	Team	Apps	(Gls)
2015–2018	Vipers SC		
2018–2021	→ Bright Stars FC (loan)		
2021	→ Kyetume FC (loan)		
2020–2022	Doves All Stars FC		
2022–	Gaddafi FC		
- * Club domestic league appearances and goals

Dan Birikwalira (born January 5, 1996) is a Ugandan football player who plays as a defender for Gaddafi FC in the Uganda Premier League.

== Early life and career ==
Dan Birikwalira was born in Mukono, Uganda, and started his football journey early on. At 1.57 meters tall, he earned a reputation for his agility and defensive skills, even though he is considered shorter than most footballers. His professional career began with Vipers SC, one of Uganda’s top football clubs, where he made significant contributions as a left-back. He also had loan spells at Bright Stars FC and Kyetume FC, where he gained important experience in Uganda's premier football leagues.

== Club career ==
=== Vipers SC ===
Birikwalira began his career at St. Mary’s SS Kitende in 2008 and subsequently moved to Rilley Packaging Mukono in the 2010/11 season. He also played for the Kampala Junior Team (KJT) from 2011 to 2013 before signing with Vipers SC in 2014, where he remained for six years.

Birikwalira started his professional journey with Vipers SC, where he was a member of a team that competed on both local and continental stages. His contributions played a significant role in Vipers' achievements in the Uganda Premier League (UPL). However, facing limited opportunities to play, he was loaned out to other clubs to aid in his development.

=== Bright Stars FC and Kyetume FC ===
During his loan periods at Bright Stars FC and Kyetume FC, Birikwalira demonstrated his defensive abilities and established himself as a dependable left-back. His experiences at these clubs allowed him to accumulate valuable match experience in Uganda’s top division.

=== Doves All Stars FC ===
In 2020, Birikwalira signed a two-year contract with Doves All Stars FC, a team that competes in the FUFA Big League, which is Uganda's second division. He chose to join a second-tier club to gain more playing time and to build a stable career after football. After joining Doves All Stars, Birikwalira stated his dedication to helping the club achieve promotion to the Uganda Premier League.

=== Gaddafi FC ===
In 2022, Birikwalira signed with Gaddafi FC, continuing his professional career in Uganda. His tenure with Gaddafi FC has seen him participate in both domestic league and cup competitions.
