= Filbert Obenchan =

Ugandan footballer (born 1996)

Personal information
- Full name: Filbert Obenchan
- Date of birth: February 7, 1996 (age 30)
- Position: Defender

Team information
- Current team: KCCA FC

Senior career*
Years	Team	Apps	(Gls)
2017–	KCCA FC		
- * Club domestic league appearances and goals

Filbert Obenchan (born February 7, 1996) is a Ugandan footballer who primarily plays as a defender. He is best known for his time at Kampala Capital City Authority (KCCA) FC, where he has made significant contributions to the team's success in the Uganda Premier League.

== Early career ==
Obenchan began his football career at the KCCA FC soccer academy, where he played for two years, from 2015 to 2017. His performance in the academy earned him a promotion to the senior team in 2017, joining other young players like Allan Okello and Peter Magambo.

== Professional career ==
After being promoted to the senior team, Obenchan was loaned to UPDF FC during the 2017-2018 season. However, his loan spell was cut short, and he returned to KCCA FC mid-season. At KCCA, he plays a crucial role in the team’s defense, helping them secure multiple titles, including one Uganda Premier League title, one Uganda Cup, one CECAFA Club Cup, two Super Cups, and one Super 8 Cup.

Obenchan left KCCA FC in May 2021 after his contract expired. The club acknowledged his contributions and expressed gratitude for his dedication over the years. However, he rejoined KCCA FC in January 2022 on a three and a half year contract, set to keep him at the club until 2025, where he was assigned shirt number 35.

== Playing style ==
Obenchan is recognized for his versatility in defense, being able to play in multiple positions along the backline. His defensive skills and tactical awareness have made him a reliable player for KCCA FC throughout his career.

== Achievements ==
During his tenure at KCCA FC, Obenchan's contributions were pivotal in the club’s success in various competitions, including:

- 1 Uganda Premier League title
- 1 Uganda Cup
- 1 CECAFA Club Cup
- 2 Super Cups
- 1 Super 8 Cup

His performances were also significant during KCCA FC's journey to the group stage of the CAF Champions League in 2018.

== Matches ==
Some of the matches played;

KCCA FC Recent Matches
Date	Competition	Home team	Score	Away team	Goals	Assists	Rating
20 Sep 2023	Uganda Premier League	BUL FC	1–1	Kampala City Council FC			
13 Sep 2023	Uganda Premier League	Kampala City Council FC	1–0	URA Kampala			
18 May 2023	Uganda Premier League	Ma Lu	1–1	Kampala City Council FC			
14 May 2023	Uganda Premier League	Kampala City Council FC	4–0	Wakiso Giants FC			
11 May 2023	Uganda Premier League	URA Kampala	1–0	Kampala City Council FC			
1 May 2023	Uganda Premier League	Kampala City Council FC	2–0	SC Villa			
05 Apr 2023	Uganda Premier League	Gaddafi FC	1–2	Kampala City Council FC			
28 Mar 2023	Uganda Premier League	Kampala City Council FC	4–1	Busoga United			
15 Mar 2023	Uganda Premier League	Vipers SC	0–1	Kampala City Council FC			
28 Feb 2023	Uganda Premier League	NEC FC Bugolobi	0–3	Kampala City Council FC			
23 Feb 2023	Uganda Premier League	Kampala City Council FC	0–1	Airtel Kitara FC			
02 Jan 2023	Uganda Premier League	Kampala City Council FC	3–2	URA Kampala			
28 Dec 2022	Uganda Premier League	Defense Forces	1–2	Kampala City Council FC			
12 Dec 2022	Uganda Premier League	Kampala City Council FC	3–0	Bright Stars			
06 Dec 2022	Uganda Premier League	Mbarara City	2–1	Kampala City Council FC			
01 Dec 2022	Uganda Premier League	Kampala City Council FC	6–1	Gaddafi FC			
10 Nov 2022	Uganda Premier League	Kampala City Council FC	3–1	Vipers SC			
31 Oct 2022	Uganda Premier League	Arua Hill SC	1–1	Kampala City Council FC			
26 Oct 2022	Uganda Premier League	Kampala City Council FC	0–2	NEC FC Bugolobi			
20 Oct 2022	Uganda Premier League	Airtel Kitara FC	3–1	Kampala City Council FC			

== Current status ==
As of 2024, Filbert Obenchan continues to play for KCCA FC, competing in the Uganda Premier League, where he remains a key player in the club's defense.
