= Hoima City Stadium =

Stadium in Hoima, Uganda

- Location within Uganda
- Full name: Hoima City Stadium
- Location: Mparo Division, Hoima City, Western Region, Uganda
- Coordinates: 01°26′08″N 31°23′38″E
- Owner: Government of Uganda
- Capacity: 20,000
- Executive suites: 12
- Surface: GrassMaster
- Field size: 115 yd × 74 yd (105 m × 68 m)

Construction
- Built: August 2024 - November 2025
- Opened: 24 December 2025
- Cost: USh484 billion (US$131 million)
- Main contractor: Summa International Construction Company Inc. of Turkey

Tenant
- Kitara (2026–present)

Hoima City Stadium is a multi-purpose stadium in Hoima, Uganda. It is intended to be used during the 2027 Africa Cup of Nations soccer tournament. The stadium is one of the three stadiums that Uganda plans to use during the tournament, that will be jointly hosted by Kenya, Tanzania and Uganda.

== Location ==
The stadium is located in Mparo Division, in the city of Hoima, in Bunyoro sub-region, in the Western Region of Uganda. The stadium sits on a total of 34.9 acres (14.1 ha) of which 10 acres (4.0 ha) was donated by the Estate of the late Dr. Rujumba and another 10 acres (4.0 ha) was sold to the FUFA by the same estate. The remaining 14.9 acres (6.0 ha) was acquired by the Uganda National Council of Sports.

== Overview ==
Hoima City Stadium is mainly intended for soccer matches, although other sports such as athletics are also expected to be practiced here. The stadium has a seated capacity of 20,000. The primary purpose of this stadium is to be part of the three host stadia that Uganda will use to host the 2027 Africa Cup of Nations in a tri-state-host tournament to be held in the East African countries of Kenya, Tanzania and Uganda.

In September 2023, the Confederation of African Football (CAF), announced the East Africa Pamoja bid by Kenya, Uganda and Tanzania as the winning bid to host the 2027 AFCON tournament. The bid beat out other bids by other countries including Algeria, Egypt, Botswana, Senegal and Nigeria.

At the bidding stage FUFA nominated Namboole Stadium, in metropolitan Kampala, Buhinga Stadium in Fort Portal, Akii Bua Stadium in Lira City and the proposed Hoima Sports Stadium. Training grounds proposed include Kampala International School Uganda (KISU), Nakivubo Stadium, Muteesa II Stadium, in Wankulukuku, Denver Godwin Stadium and St. Mary's Stadium Kitende.

== Construction ==
With FUFA having secured the land where the infrastructure would be built, construction funded by the government of Uganda, was expected to start in 2024, once the architectural plans and environmental studies are finalized and approved.

In January 2024, Ugandan media reported that the title of the land on which the stadium was built was transferred to the Uganda National Council of Sports, "because government cannot build on private land". Also, Summa International Construction Company Inc. of Turkey, was selected to build the stadium. The company studied the topography, terrain and soil characteristic, ahead of contract signing. The construction contract between Summa Construction Inc. and the Uganda NCS was signed in June 2024 at State House Nakasero, in Kampala.

Construction started in August 2024, with completion initially expected in December 2025. Completion of construction was achieved in October 2025. The stadium was officially opened on 24 December 2025.

== See also ==
- List of African stadiums by capacity
- List of stadiums in Africa
- Akii Bua Stadium
- Mandela National Stadium
- Masaka Sports Stadium
