= Bunamwaya Stadium =

Stadium in Wakiso Town, Uganda

Coordinates: 0°23′46″N 32°28′10″E

- Interactive map of Bunamwaya Stadium
- Location: Wakiso Town, Uganda
- Capacity: 5,000
- Field size: 115 yd × 74 yd (105 m × 68 m)

Tenant
- Bunamwaya SC

Bunamwaya Stadium is a multi-purpose stadium in Wakiso Town, Uganda. It is currently used mostly for football matches and serves as the home venue of Bunamwaya SC of the Ugandan Super League. The stadium has a capacity of 5,000 people.

== See also ==
- List of African stadiums by capacity
- List of stadiums in Africa
