= Calvin Peter Emayu =

Ugandan footballer

Personal information
- Full name: Calvin Peter Emayu
- Position: Winger

Team information
- Current team: Entebbe UPPC

College career
Years	Team	Apps	(Gls)
- Uganda Martyrs University

Senior career*
Years	Team	Apps	(Gls)
2024	Ntugasaze		
- UWA Football Club
2026–	Entebbe UPPC		
- * Club domestic league appearances and goals

Calvin Peter Emayu is a Ugandan footballer who plays as a winger for Uganda Premier League club Entebbe UPPC. He joined the club from UWA Football Club in September 2026. He also represented Uganda Martyrs University, helping the team win the 2024–25 University Football League.

== Career ==
=== University football ===
Emayu played for Uganda Martyrs University at the 2023 Association of Uganda University Sports Games.

In December 2024, he scored the first goal in a match between his team Uganda Martyrs against Makerere University where they won 2-1, in the men's football final of the Eastern Africa University Games.

On 27 April 2025, Emayu opened the scoring in the match of Uganda Martyrs against St. Lawrence University in the University Football League final at Muteesa II Stadium. His team won with 3-0 score, and this victory secured the university's third title. He also made an assist goal in this match.

After the tournament, the Uganda newspaper The Observer selected Emayu as the left winger in its team of the 2024–25 University Football League season.

=== Ntugasaze ===
Emayu played for Ntugasaze in 2024. On 27 June, he scored in the 75 minute of a match against Proline FC where his team won 2-0. Ntugasaze managed to secure promotion to the FUFA Big League for the 2024-2025 season.

=== Masaza competitions ===
Emayu also played in the Busoga Masaza Cup. He was also included in Kyaggwe's squad for the 2026 competition.

=== Entebbe UPPC ===
In September 2026, Emayu joined Entebbe UPPC from UWA Football Club on a two-year contract.
