= Masaka Sports Stadium =

Stadium in Masaka, Uganda

- Location within Uganda
- Location: Masaka City; Buganda Region; Uganda
- Coordinates: 00°20′41″S 31°44′08″E
- Owner: Masaka City Government
- Capacity: 15,000 (expected)
- Surface: AstroTurf
- Field size: 115 yd × 74 yd (105 m × 68 m)

Construction
- Built: September 2024
- Opened: 2026 (expected)
- Cost: USh19 billion (US$5.22 million)
- Architects: Cornerstone Designs and Engineering Limited
- Main contractor: Kaleeta Construction Limited of Uganda

The Masaka Sports Stadium, also Masaka Recreation Ground, is a planned multi-purpose stadium in Uganda. It is intended to be used for soccer matches and athletic completions. In addition, facilities for volleyball and basketball will be constructed. A swimming pool is planned to be erected at the site.

== Location ==
The stadium is located in the city of Masaka, in Masaka District, in the Buganda Region of Uganda. The stadium sits on a piece of real estate in the city centre referred to as the Masaka Recreation Grounds. The geographical coordinates of the stadium are:0°20'41.0"S 31°44'08.0"E (Latitude:-0.344722; Longitude:31.735556).

== Overview ==
The real estate on which the stadium sits was donated by King Muteesa II of Buganda in 1955. The site is under the supervision and management of Masaka City Council. Over the years since then, the site has fallen into disrepair.

== Construction ==
The engineering, procurement and construction (EPC) contract was awarded to a company called Kaleeta Construction Limited at a contract price of USh19 billion (approx. US$5.22 million). The works are expected to last 18 months.

The stadium architect is Cornerstone Designs and Engineering Limited, who was paid USh1.45 billion (approx. US$400,000) for the work. The facility will have seating capacity of 15,000 spectators and an artificial turf surface. Soccer, athletics, swimming, volleyball, basketball and other sports will be catered for at the new stadium.

== See also ==
- List of African stadiums by capacity
- List of stadiums in Africa
- Hoima City Stadium
