= Ssozi Shaka =

Ugandan footballer (born 1994)

Shaka Ssozi
Personal information
- Date of birth: 2 February 1994 (age 32)
- Place of birth: Uganda
- Position: Midfielder

Team information
- Current team: Heegan

Youth career
- 2006–2010: Nyaminya Soccer Academy

Senior career*
| Years | Team | Apps | (Gls) |
| 2011–2015 | Nyaminya FC | | |
| 2015–2017 | BUL FC | | (1) |
| 2018–2019 | Kyetume FC | | |
| 2019–2021 | Nyamityobora FC | | |
| 2020–2022 | Busoga United | | (9) |
| 2023– | Heegan | | (11) |
- * Club domestic league appearances and goals

Ssozi Shaka (born 2 February 1994) is Ugandan footballer who plays as a forward for Heegan football club in Somalia.

== Early life ==
Ssozi started his football career at a young age. He joined Nyaminya soccer academy in 2006 and played for the team until 2010. He also featured in Nyaminya Football club from 2011 to 2015. He progressed to BUL FC (2015–2017), Kyetume Football club (2018–2019) and Nyamityobora (September 2019 – January 2021).

== Career ==
=== BIDCO Uganda Limited Jinja Football Club ===
Ssozi played for BIDCO Uganda Limited Jinja Football Club from 2015 to 2018 and also featured in the 2018–19 season. He scored a goal against Simba S.C in 2016

==== BUSOGA UNITED FOOTBALL CLUB ====
In 2020, Ssozi transferred to Busoga United football club and scored 4 goals in the 2020–21 football season. He scored 5 goals in the 2021–22 season

In 2023,Shaka joined Heegan in 2023 scoring 4 goals in the 2023–24 season and 7 goals in the 2024–25 season.

== See also ==
- Reagan Mpande
- Elvis Npondwe
- Denis Omedi
