= 2021–22 Uganda Premier League =

Football season in Uganda

Uganda Premier League
- Season: 2021–22
- Champions: Vipers SC
- Champions League: Vipers SC
- Confederation Cup: Bul FC
- Matches: 240
- Goals: 587 (2.45 per match)

The 2021–22 Uganda Premier League was the 54th season of the Uganda Premier League, the top-tier football league in Uganda.

Vipers SC won the championship with four games to go, finishing 18 points above second-placed KCCA. Tooro United were also confirmed relegated with four games to go.

Onduparaka FC were docked two points and two goals and were made to replay their December match against KCCA after violence broke out when a penalty was awarded in the 5th minute of extra time.

== League Changes ==
Three teams were promoted from the 2020–21 FUFA Big League, which ended early due to a 42-day lockdown as a result of the COVID-19 pandemic. Arua Hill and Tooro United had already clinched promotion at that point and were promoted. Gaddafi FC were the third team promoted after defeating Proline 2–0 in the final of a four-team playoff held in August 2021.

They replaced Kyetume FC, MYDA, and Kitara, who were relegated from the 2020–21 season.

== League Table ==
Pos	Team	Pld	W	D	L	GF	GA	GD	Pts	Qualification or relegation
1	Vipers (C)	30	23	5	2	69	19	+50	74	Champions, Qualification to the 2022–23 CAF Champions League
2	Kampala Capital City Authority	30	15	11	4	41	21	+20	56	
3	Uganda Revenue Authority	30	15	10	5	57	27	+30	55	
4	BUL	30	14	10	6	54	32	+22	52	Qualification to the 2022–23 CAF Confederation Cup
5	Arua Hill	30	14	10	6	38	27	+11	52	
6	Express	30	11	13	6	31	25	+6	46	
7	Wakiso Giants	30	12	3	15	38	47	−9	39	
8	Gaddafi	30	9	10	11	33	36	−3	37	
9	Onduparaka (Note: -2 points, -2 goals)	30	10	9	11	32	37	−5	37	
10	UPDF FC	30	9	10	11	33	42	−9	37	
11	Bright Stars	30	9	9	12	26	34	−8	36	
12	SC Villa (Note: -1 points)	30	8	10	12	27	32	−5	33	
13	Busoga United	30	9	5	16	26	45	−19	32	
14	Police (R)	30	6	10	14	32	46	−14	28	Relegation to the 2022–23 FUFA Big League
15	Mbarara City (R)	30	6	7	17	28	36	−8	25	Relegation to the 2022–23 FUFA Big League
16	Tooro United (R)	30	2	4	24	20	81	−61	10	Relegation to the 2022–23 FUFA Big League

Source: soccerway.com
Rules for classification: 1) points; 2) goal difference; 3) number of goals scored.
(C) Champions; (R) Relegated
