= Elvis Ngonde =

Ugandan footballer (born 2002)

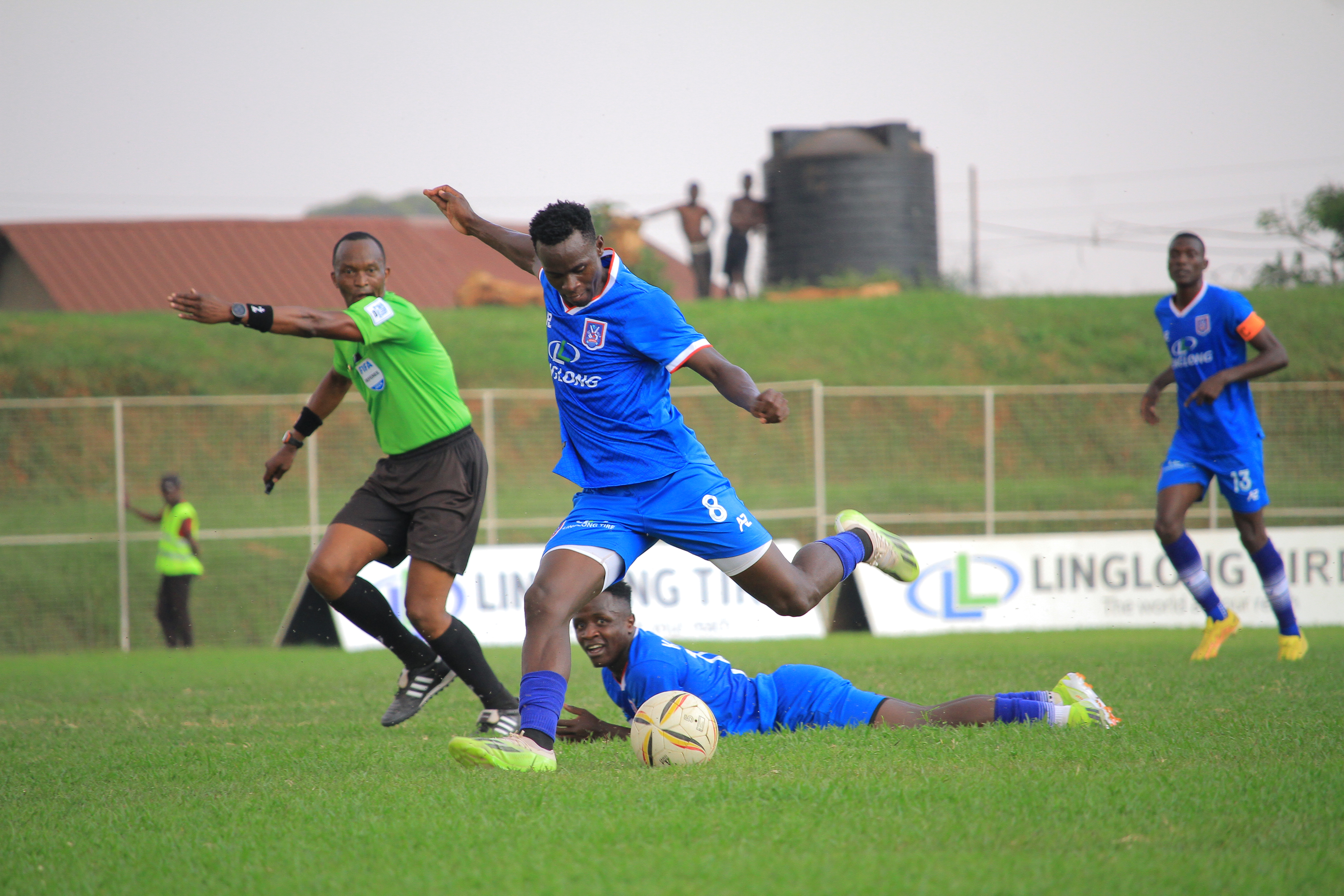
- Ngonde in 2024

Personal information
- Date of birth: June 19, 2002 (age 24)
- Place of birth: Uganda
- Position: Midfielder

Team information
- Current team: KCCA FC

Youth career
- St Mary’s SS Kitende

Senior career*
| Years | Team | Apps | (Gls) |
| 2021-2022 | Busoga United FC | 16 | (0) |
| 2022–2023 | Gaddafi FC | 12 | (1) |
| 2023–2026 | SC Villa | 24 | (5) |
| 2026–Present | KCCA FC | | |

International career^{‡}
| 2018 | Uganda U17 | | |
| 2023–Present | Uganda Cranes | 1 | (0) |
- * Club domestic league appearances and goals as of 8 September 2025 ‡ National team caps and goals as of 8 September 2025

Elvis Ngonde (born 19 June 2002) is a Ugandan footballer who plays as a midfielder for Kampala Capital City Authority FC in the Uganda Premier League and the Uganda national football team.

== Early life and youth career ==
Ngonde developed at St Mary’s SS Kitende, where he featured in USSSA school competitions, notably scoring in the final in Arua to help Kitende SS defeat St Andrew Kaggwa.

In 2018, he was part of the Uganda U17 team (Uganda Cubs) but was declared ineligible for AFCON U17 qualifiers after failing an MRI age test.

== Club career ==
Ngonde began his professional career with Busoga United FC, making 16 league appearances with no goals.

In August 2022, he transferred to Gaddafi FC, where he made 12 league appearances and scored 1 goal.

He joined SC Villa in September 2023. As of the 2024–25 season, he has made 14 league appearances, scoring 1 goal, and also recorded 1 assist.

In June 2026, he joined Kampala Capital City Authority FC.

== International career ==
In October 2023, Ngonde received his first senior call-up to the Uganda Cranes for friendlies against Mali and Zambia.

In 2025, he has earned a call to national football team in 2024 African Nations Championship.

== Career statistics ==
=== Club ===
As of 8 September 2025:

| Season | Club | League | Apps | Goals |
|---|---|---|---|---|
| 2021–2022 | Busoga United | Uganda Premier League | 16 | 0 |
| 2022–23 | Gaddafi FC | Uganda Premier League | 12 | 1 |
| 2023-2026 | SC Villa | Uganda Premier League | 24 | 5 |
| 2026-Present | KCCA FC | Uganda Premier League | 0 | 0 |

=== International ===
As of 8 September 2025:

| National team | Year | Apps | Goals |
|---|---|---|---|
| Uganda | 2023 | 1 | 0 |
