= 2022–23 FUFA Big League =

FUFA Big League
- Season: 2022–23
- Promoted: Kitara FC; Mbarara City; NEC
- Relegated: Luweero United; Soroti City; Adjumani TC; Northern Gateway
- Matches played: 240
- Goals scored: 606 (2.53 per match)

The 2022–23 FUFA Big League was a season of second division football in Uganda.

The league returned to a 16-team format after 11 teams participated in the 2021–22 season, with eight teams being promoted from regional leagues.

Kitara won their first ever second division title on the last day of the season as they defeated Kaaro Karungi 1–0. Mbarara City finished runners-up after their 3–0 win on the last day over already relegated Northern Gateway. Both teams earned promotion to the 2023–24 Uganda Premier League NEC were the third team promoted after winning 4–1 on the final match day meaning Police could not catch them and finished fourth.

Tooro United were relegated from the 2021–22 Uganda Premier League but were excluded from the fixture for failing licensing requirements.

Kataka FC were docked two points and two goals after a disciplinary hearing before the season after violence in their last home game of the 2021–22 season against Kyetume FC.

== League Table ==
Pos	Team	Pld	W	D	L	GF	GA	GD	Pts	Qualification or relegation
1	Kitara (P, C)	30	17	10	3	59	20	+39	61	Promotion to the 2023–24 Uganda Premier League
2	Mbarara City (P)	30	16	12	2	51	19	+32	60	Promotion to the 2023–24 Uganda Premier League
3	NEC (P)	30	17	6	7	45	22	+23	57	Promotion to the 2023–24 Uganda Premier League
4	Police	30	14	12	4	41	20	+21	54	
5	Lugazi	30	12	8	10	44	30	+14	44	
6	Ndejje University	30	11	9	10	39	41	−2	42	
7	Booma	30	10	10	10	37	36	+1	40	
8	Kyetume	30	11	7	12	37	39	−2	40	
9	Calvary	30	12	4	14	36	48	−12	40	
10	Jinja North Utd	30	10	9	11	27	31	−4	39	
11	Kaaro Karungi	30	10	7	13	29	40	−11	37	
12	Kataka (Note: -2 points, -2 goals)	30	9	9	12	38	39	−1	34	
13	Luweero United (R)	30	9	5	16	32	48	−16	32	Relegation
14	Soroti City (R)	30	9	3	18	29	53	−24	30	Relegation
15	Adjumani TC (R)	30	6	8	16	37	58	−21	26	Relegation
16	Northern Gateway (R)	30	4	7	19	23	62	−39	19	Relegation

Rules for classification: 1) points; 2) goal difference; 3) number of goals scored.
(C) Champions; (P) Promoted; (R) Relegated
