= Kakyeka Stadium =

Stadium in Mbarara, Uganda

- Location within Uganda
- Full name: Kakyeka Stadium
- Location: Kamukuzi Division; Mbarara City; Western Region, Uganda; Uganda
- Coordinates: 0.6105°S 30.6470°E
- Capacity: 1,500
- Surface: Grass
- Field size: 115 yd × 74 yd (105 m × 68 m)

Tenants
- Mbarara City FC; Nyamityobora FC

Kakyeka Stadium is the stadium located in Mbarara in Western Region, Uganda. The Stadium is in the West side of the main city and it has a capacity of 1,500 people.

In 2016, the government of Uganda had a plan to improve all stadia in every region and a new Kakyeka was to be constructed on another big piece of land in Mbarara.

In 2020, the Ministry of Sports gave out 10 million shillings to the Municipal council to redevelop it, but later on the Turkish investors pulled out of the interest.

In 2018, Mbarara City FC was banished by FUFA licensing committee to play in The Uganda Premier League over the failure to meet the standards at which Kakyeka Stadium was meant for the team to use as their home ground to host in the league This also caused bitter rows between football lovers and the administration of Mbarara District due to use of it to host crusades and other events without maintaining the standards. The stadium is also known for hosting annual celebrations for 100.2 Fm Radio West in Mbarara, dubbed Ekinihiro Kya Radio West.

== See also ==
- List of African stadiums by capacity
- List of stadiums in Africa
