= Blacks Power FC =

Ugandan football club

- Nickname: The Black Warriors
- Founded: 2006
- Stadium: BCS Sports Complex
- Capacity: 10,000
- Owner: Agnes Mugena
- Manager: Simon Peter Ssalongo Mugerwa
- League: Uganda Premier League
- Website: https://blackspowerfc.com/

Blacks Power Football Club is a Ugandan football club organized with passion and energy of Northern Uganda. It was formerly known as Bukedea Town Council FC since 2019 and in 2020, its name changed to Blacks Power FC. The club participates in the Uganda Premier League, the top league in Ugandan football. The club was founded in 2006. Their nickname is The Black Warriors.

== History ==
The club started as a small administrative centre by Agnes Mugena who is a FUFA delegate for North-East Uganda. As subsistence farming than football in 2006 in Bukedea District. In 2015, Bukedea Town Council FC reached FUFA Big League.

=== Change of name ===
On September 15, 2020, the name was changed to Blacks Power FC since Bukedea Town Council was not supportive as said by Samuel Opio in 2021 by then. The funs got annoyed and grieved that the club has lost their identity and they could no longer praised their own club. FUFA granted them permission to change the name but with a cost that is they were told to change the home ground to either Lira or Gulu or FUFA Technical Centre, Njeru from Emokori grounds in the town council because it could not fit the Big League football standard. They were also warned that the club should not play in any of the Bukedea playgrounds. They chose Lira near their patron and co-owner, Ogwel Patrick and Lira did the same to them.

2026 messes

Agnes Mugena, Cornelius Okiror and Patrick Ogwel as chair holders in proportion of 35%:5%:60% respectively put the black warriors as deeply rooted club in Northern Uganda under the chair holders of, they were again made to retained momentum to used Hoima City Stadium under their MoU signed with National Council of Sports.

In just less than 2 months after the start of the 2026/2027 Uganda Premier League season that started on Friday, 28 August 2026, the Black Warriors received a notification from Uganda National Council of Sports that their MoU has been terminated to use Hoima city stadium as it exclusively prepares to be hosting international matches.

The termination of the earlier signed MoU between the two parties affected the league fixtures since some of the club matches like their match with Uganda Revenue Authority FC had to be postponed as their hunt for a new ground though it energizes the opponent team to organize. The terminated MoU was allowing two clubs to use this national stadium, the other affected club was Kitara FC who later wrote an appeal but controversies arose when Ismail Kasule, MP Hoima West Division, Hoima City tabled in the parliament that Kitara FC had made payment of Shs90 millions to use the stadium in which Peter Ogwang responded by saying that the stadium will be handed over to private investor to monitor on government's behalf.

The black warriors then returned to use Bukedea Comprehensive School (BCS) Sport Complex stadium while enjoying together with Kataka FC after their Mbale Stadium failed to meet FUFA standardsas the home playground after moving away from Bukedea town council

== Head coaches since 2022 ==
- (Uganda) Bob Obira (early 2022, 2024-2025)
- (Uganda) Peter Onen coaching for 102days (01/07/2022-11/10/2022)
- (Uganda) Hussein Mbalangu coaching for 255days (18/10/2022-30/06/2023)
- (Uganda) Simon Mugerwa (01/08/2026-up to date)

== Honours ==
2025/26 Big League Champions.

== Current team ==
Note: Flags indicate national team as defined under FIFA eligibility rules; some limited exceptions apply. Players may hold more than one non-FIFA nationality.

No.	Pos.	Nation	Player
1	GK	UGA	Micheal Okiria
19	GK	UGA	Martin Ssenkoto Kalanda
2	DF	UGA	Henry Orom
3	DF	UGA	Daniel Otim
4	DF	UGA	Ivan Okello
5	DF	UGA	Brian Ogwal
6	DF	UGA	Ronald Owiny Ogenga
15	DF	UGA	Pascal Irana
18	DF	UGA	John Paul Acire
24	DF	UGA	Isaac Okello
25	DF	UGA	Rajab Fazil
8	MF	UGA	Rashid Yakin
13	MF	UGA	Simon Misaki Opio
17	MF	UGA	Micheal Siwu
25	MF	UGA	Kakomo Amir
27	MF	UGA	Collins Alinaitwe
31	MF	UGA	Joshua Omara
32	MF	UGA	Andrea Ogwal
33	MF	UGA	Gerald Ronald Kirya
7	FW	UGA	Emmanuel Wabulo
10	FW	NIG	Innocent Maduka
12	FW	UGA	Baker Buyala
14	FW	UGA	Nathan Oloro
16	FW	UGA	Steven Kabuye
20	FW	UGA	Paul Elias Oonyu
21	FW	UGA	Emmanuel Janan Oketch
28	FW	UGA	Amutuhaire Isaac
37	FW	UGA	Oscar Richard Otim
