= GrassMaster =

Sports playing field surface composed of natural grass combined with artificial fibres

GrassMaster is a hybrid grass sports playing field surface composed of natural grass combined with artificial fibres. The method was developed and patented by Desso Sports from the Netherlands in 1993. This hybrid grass system is now marketed and further developed by Tarkett Sports after a takeover of Desso Sports and has since been re-branded as GrassMaster.

== Technology ==
GrassMaster reinforces a natural grass pitch by vertically inserting 20 million polypropylene (PP) fibres into the soil equally spread over the entire playing field. The 20 cm (7.9 in) long PP fibres are injected by computer-controlled machines, 18 cm (7.1 in) deep so 2 cm (0.8 in) remains above the surface. The PP fibres are inserted in a grid of about 2 cm × 2 cm (0.8 in × 0.8 in). The grass roots entwine with the fibres and grow deeper and wider. The PP fibres above the surface are designed to ensure an even and stable surface. GrassMaster may be installed before seeding, after seeding or on grass sods.

== Major installations ==
Stadium	Club	Sport	Country
Bet365 Stadium	Stoke City	Association football	England
Ashton Gate Stadium	Bristol City and Bristol Bears	Association football and rugby union	England
Prenton Park	Tranmere Rovers F.C.	Association football	England
Villa Park	Aston Villa	Association football	England
St James’ Park	Newcastle United	Association football	England
Stamford Bridge	Chelsea	Association football	England
Elland Road	Leeds United	Association football	England
Hillsborough	Sheffield Wednesday	Association football	England
Camp Nou	FC Barcelona	Association football	Spain
El Campín Stadium	Millonarios F.C. and Independiente Santa Fe	Association football	Colombia
Luminus Arena	KRC Genk	Association football	Belgium
San Siro	Inter Milan and AC Milan	Association football	Italy
Stade Marcel Picot	AS Nancy	Association football	France
King Abdullah Sports City	Ittihad FC and Al-Ahli Saudi FC	Association football	Saudi Arabia
Mapei Stadium	US Sassuolo Calcio	Association football	Italy
Goodison Park	Everton	Association football	England
Stade Marcel-Michelin	ASM Clermont Auvergne	Rugby union	France
CNFE Clairefontaine	French Football Federation	Association football	France
Anfield	Liverpool	Association football	England
Selhurst Park	Crystal Palace	Association football	England
Carrow Road	Norwich City	Association football	England
Parc des Princes	Paris Saint-Germain	Association football	France
Stade de Roudourou	En Avant Guingamp	Association football	France
Stade Louis II	AS Monaco	Association football	Monaco
Stade Océane	Le Havre	Association football	France
Stade de France	France	Association football and other events	France
Stade Francis-Le Blé	Stade Brestois 29	Association football	France
Stade Auguste-Delaune	Stade de Reims	Association football	France
Estádio Parque São Jorge	Corinthians	Association football	Brazil
Neo Química Arena	Corinthians	Association football	Brazil
Arena do Grêmio	Grêmio	Association football	Brazil
King Power Stadium	Leicester City	Association football	England
Twickenham Stadium	Rugby Football Union	Rugby union	England
Emirates Stadium	Arsenal	Association football	England
Kirklees Stadium	Huddersfield Town and Huddersfield Giants	Association football and rugby league	England
Celtic Park	Celtic	Association football	Scotland
Leigh Sports Village	Leigh	Rugby league	England
City of Manchester Stadium	Manchester City	Association football	England
Old Trafford	Manchester United	Association football	England
Trafford Training Centre	Manchester United	Association football	England
Adams Park	Wycombe Wanderers (and formerly Wasps)	Association football (and formerly rugby union)	England
Vicarage Road	Watford (and formerly Saracens)	Association football (and formerly rugby union)	England
Wembley Stadium	England	Association football and other events	England
Aviva Stadium	Ireland national rugby union team and Republic of Ireland national football team	Rugby union and association football	Ireland
Stadion Galgenwaard	Utrecht	Association football	Netherlands
Euroborg	FC Groningen	Association football	Netherlands
AFAS Stadion	AZ Alkmaar	Association football	Netherlands
Sportpark De Toekomst	AFC Ajax	Association football	Netherlands
Forsyth Barr Stadium	Highlanders	Rugby union	New Zealand
Lerkendal Stadion	Rosenborg	Association football	Norway
Arena Khimki	Khimki	Association football	Russia
Mbombela Stadium	2010 FIFA World Cup South Africa	Association football	South Africa
Peter Mokaba Stadium	2010 FIFA World Cup South Africa	Association football	South Africa
Nelson Mandela Bay Stadium	2010 FIFA World Cup South Africa and South Africa Sevens	Association football and rugby sevens	South Africa
Lincoln Financial Field	Philadelphia Eagles	American football	United States
Lambeau Field	Green Bay Packers	American football	United States
Liberty Stadium	Swansea City and Ospreys	Association football and rugby union	Wales
Millennium Stadium	Welsh Rugby Union	Rugby union (also Welsh international association football)	Wales
Cardiff City Stadium	Cardiff City (and formerly Cardiff Blues)	Association football (and formerly rugby union)	Wales
National Stadium, Singapore	Singapore	Rugby union and association football	Singapore
Rodney Parade	Dragons; Newport County; Newport RFC	Rugby union and association football	Wales
Volkswagen Arena	VfL Wolfsburg	Association football	Germany
Metalist Stadium	Metalist Kharkiv	Association football	Ukraine
Donbass Arena	Shakhtar Donetsk	Association football	Ukraine
Central City Stadium	National Team of Kazakhstan	Association football	Kazakhstan
Murrayfield Stadium	Edinburgh Rugby and Scotland	Rugby union	Scotland
Stadio Marc'Antonio Bentegodi	Hellas Verona and Chievo Verona	Association football	Italy
Lokomotiv Stadium	FC Lokomotiv Moscow	Association football	Russia
Kazan Arena	FC Rubin Kazan	Association football	Russia
Estadio de la Cerámica	Villareal CF	Association football	Spain
Melbourne City Football Academy	Melbourne City FC	Association football	Australia
Ooredoo Training Centre	Paris Saint-Germain	Association football	France
St Georges Park	National Football Centre FA	Association football	England
Bramall Lane	Sheffield United	Association football	England
Imam Reza Stadium	Padideh F.C.	Association football	Iran
Cairo International Stadium	Egyptian national football team and Zamalek	Association football	Egypt
El Sekka El Hadid Stadium	El Sekka El Hadid SC	Association football	Egypt
Tottenham Hotspur Stadium	Tottenham Hotspur	Association football	England
Misr Stadium	Egypt	Association football	Egypt
Vodafone Park	Beşiktaş J.K.	Association football	Turkey
Bashundhara Kings Arena	Bashundhara Kings	Association football	Bangladesh
Darius and Girėnas Stadium	FK Kauno Žalgiris Lithuania national football team	Association football	Lithuania
Brisbane Road	Leyton Orient	Association football	England
The Valley	Charlton Athletic	Association football	England
Mandela National Stadium	Uganda	Association football and other events	Uganda
