= List of stadiums in Africa =

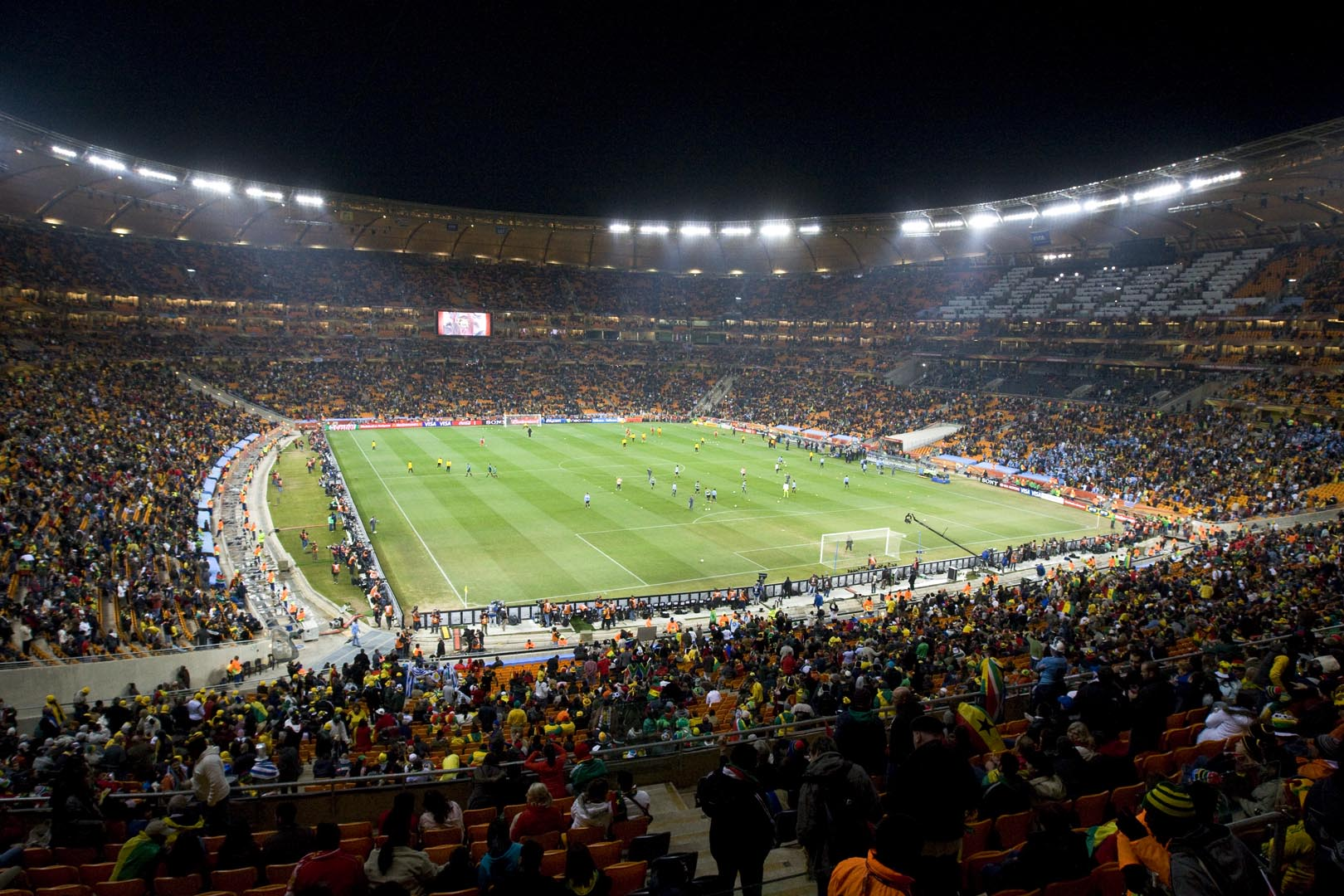
FNB Stadium

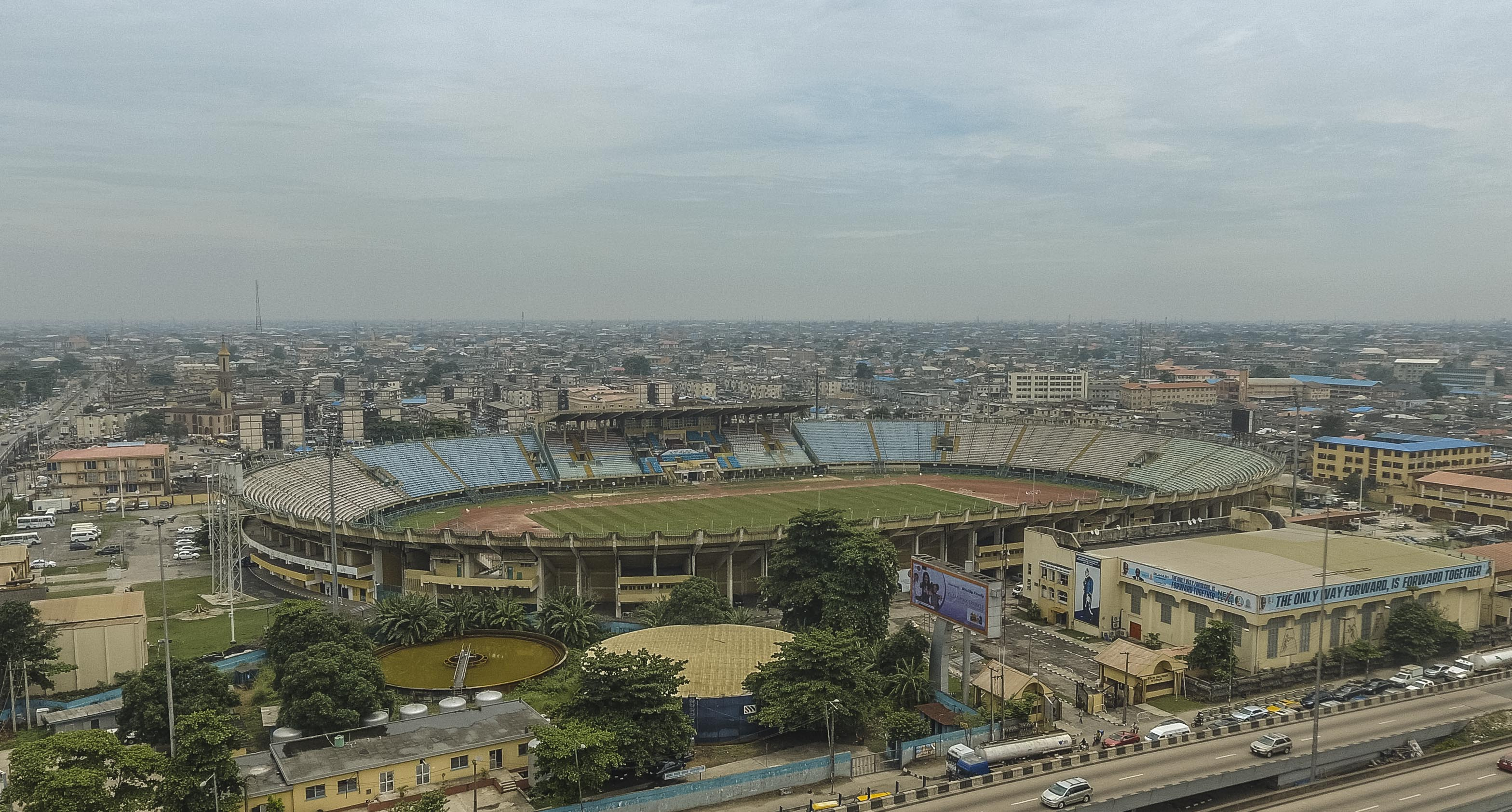
Teslim Balogun Stadium

The following is a list of stadiums in Africa.

== List ==
=== Algeria ===
- Stade 5 Juillet 1962, Algiers
- Stade 19 Mai 1956, Annaba
- Hocine Aït Ahmed Stadium, Tizi Ouzou
- Stade 24 Fevrier 1956, Sidi Bel Abbes
- Nelson Mandela Stadium, Algiers
- Miloud Hadefi Stadium, Oran
- Stade Ahmed Zabana, Oran
- Stade Mohamed Hamlaoui, Constantine
- Stade Omar Hammadi, Bologhine
- Ali La Pointe Stadium, Douéra
- Stade 20 Aout 1955, Skikda
- Rouibah Hocine Stadium, Jijel
- Stade Mustapha Tchaker, Blida
- Stade Ahmed Kaïd, Tiaret
- Stade Tahar Zoughari, Relizane
- Stade 13 Avril 1958, Saïda
- Stade Akid Lotfi, Tlemcen

=== Angola ===
- Estádio 11 de Novembro, Luanda
- Estádio da Cidadela, Luanda
- Estádio Nacional de Ombaka, Benguela
- Estádio Nacional do Chiazi, Cabinda
- Estádio Nacional da Tundavala, Lubango
- Estádio do Santos, Viana
- Estádio Joaquim Dinis, Luanda
- Estádio Municipal de Benguela, Benguela

=== Benin ===
- Stade de l'Amitié, Cotonou

=== Botswana ===
- Botswana National Stadium, Gaborone
- Francis-town Stadium
- New Lobatse Stadium
- Molepolole Stadium
- Maun Stadium
- Phikwe Stadium
- University of Botswana Stadium

=== Burkina Faso ===
- Stade du 4-Août, Ouagadougou
- Stade Balibiè, Koudougou
- Statde Municipal, Bobo Dioulasso

=== Burundi ===
- Prince Louis Rwagasore Stadium, Bujumbura

=== Cameroon ===
- Stade de la Reunification, Douala
- Stade Ahmadou Ahidjo, Yaoundé
- Stade Omnisport de Limbe, Limbe
- Stade de Mbouda, Mbouda
- Stade Roumde Adjia, Garoua
- Stade Militaire, Yaoundé
- Stade Mbappé Léppé, Douala
- Stade de Moliko, Buea
- Stade Omnisport de Bafoussam, Bafoussam
- Stade Paul Biya, Yaoundé
- Stade Roger Milla, Douala
- Stade de la GP, Yaoundé

=== Cape Verde ===
- Estádio da Várzea, Praia

=== Central African Republic ===
- Barthelemy Boganda Stadium, Bangui

=== Chad ===
- Stade Nacional, N'Djamena

=== Comoros ===
- Stade de Beaumer, Moroni
- Stade Said Mohamed Cheikh, Moroni

=== Congo-Brazzaville ===
- Stade de la Revolution, Brazzaville

=== Democratic Republic of the Congo ===
- Stade des Martyrs, Kinshasa
- Stade Municipal de Lubumbashi, Lubumbashi

=== Djibouti ===
- Stade du Ville, Djibouti

=== Egypt ===
- 6 October Stadium, Cairo
- 30 June Stadium, Cairo
- Abou Qir Fertilizers Stadium, Alexandria
- Ala'ab Damanhour Stadium, Damanhour
- Alexandria Stadium, Alexandria
- Aluminium Stadium, Nag Hammadi
- Arish Stadium, Arish
- Al Assiouty Sport Stadium, Assiut
- Assiut University Stadium, Assiut
- Aswan Stadium, Aswan
- Banha Stadium, Banha
- Beni Ebeid Stadium, Beni Ebeid
- Beni Suef Stadium, Beni Suef
- Borg El Arab Stadium, Alexandria
- Cairo International Stadium, Cairo
- Cairo Military Academy Stadium, Cairo
- Desouk Stadium, Desouk
- Eastern Company Stadium, Cairo
- Egyptian Army Stadium, Suez
- Ezzedin Yacoub Stadium, Alexandria
- Fayoum Stadium, Fayoum
- Ghazl El Mahalla Stadium, El Mahalla
- El Gouna Stadium, El Gouna
- Haras El Hodoud Stadium, Alexandria
- Helmy "Zamora" Stadium, Cairo
- Ismailia Stadium, Ismailia
- Ittihad Nabarouh Stadium, Nabarouh
- Kafr El Sheikh Stadium, Kafr El Sheikh
- KIMA Aswan Stadium, Aswan
- Luxor Stadium, Luxor
- El Mansoura Stadium, El Mansoura
- Al Masry Club Stadium, Port Said
- Matai Stadium, Beni Mazar
- Al Merreikh Stadium, Port Said
- El Minya University Stadium, El Minya
- New Administrative Capital Stadium, New Administrative Capital
- Mit Okba Stadium, Giza
- Mokhtar El Tetsh Stadium, Cairo
- El Monufia University Stadium, Shebin El Koum
- MS Abnub Stadium, Dayrout
- MS Koum Hamada Stadium, Koum Hamada
- National Bank of Egypt Stadium, Cairo
- Nogoom El Mostakbal Stadium, Cairo
- Osman Ahmed Osman Stadium, Cairo
- Petro Sport Stadium, Cairo
- Police Academy Stadium, Cairo
- Qena Stadium, Qena
- Ras El Bar Stadium, Damietta
- Al Rebat & Al Anwar Stadium, Port Said
- Al Salam Stadium, Cairo
- El Sekka El Hadid Stadium, Cairo
- Sherbeen Stadium, Sherbeen
- El Shams Stadium, Cairo
- Sharm El Sheikh Stadium, Sharm El Sheikh
- Sohag Stadium, Sohag
- Suez Canal Stadium, Ismailia
- Suez Stadium, Suez
- Tanta Stadium, Tanta
- Al Walideya Stadium, Assiut
- Zagazig University Stadium, Zagazig
- Al Zarka Stadium, Al Zarka

=== Equatorial Guinea ===
- Estadio Internacional, Malabo

=== Eritrea ===
- ChicChero Stadium, Asmara
- Dekemhare Stadium, Dekemhare
- Denden Stadium, Asmara
- Keren Stadium, Keren
- Olympic Stadium, Asmara

=== Ethiopia ===
- Abebe Bikila Stadium, Addis Ababa
- Adama Stadium, Adama
- Addis Ababa Stadium, Addis Ababa
- Addis Ababa National Stadium, Addis Ababa
- Bahir Dar Stadium, Bahir Dar
- Dire Dawa Stadium, Dire Dawa
- Fasiledes Stadium, Gondar
- Hawassa Kenema Stadium, Hawassa
- Harrar Bira Stadium, Harari
- Mekele Stadium, Mekele
- Tigray Stadium, Tigray
- Wonji Stadium, Wonji
- Hawassa Stadium, Hawassa
- Woldiya Stadium, Weldiya

=== Gabon ===
- Stade Omar Bongo, Libreville
- Stade d'Angondjé, Libreville
- Stade d'Oyem, Oyem
- Stade de Port-Gentil, Port-Gentil
- Stade Idriss Ngari, Owendo

=== Gambia ===
- Independence Stadium, Bakau

=== Ghana ===
- Accra Sports Stadium, Accra
- Baba Yara Stadium, Kumasi
- Tamale Stadium, Tamale
- Sekondi-Takoradi Stadium, Sekondi
- Len Clay Stadium, Obuasi
- Cape Coast Sports Stadium, Cape Coast

=== Guinea ===
- Nongo Stadium, Conakry
- Stade 28 Septembre, Conakry

=== Guinea Bissau ===
- Estádio 24 de Setembro, Bissau
- Estádio Lino Correia, Bissau

=== Ivory Coast ===
- Stade Félix Houphouet-Boigny, Abidjan
- Stade Bouaké, Bouaké

=== Kenya ===
- Moi International Sports Centre, Kasarani, Nairobi
- Nairobi City Stadium
- Nyayo National Stadium, Nairobi
- RFUEA Ground, Nairobi,

=== Lesotho ===
- National Stadium, Maseru

=== Liberia ===
- National Complex, Monrovia

=== Libya ===
- June 11 Stadium, Tripoli
- March 28 Stadium, Benghazi

=== Madagascar ===
- Mahama Sina Stadium, Antananarivo

=== Malawi ===
- Kamazu Stadium, Blantyre

=== Mali ===
- Stade 26 Mars, Bamako
- Stade Modibo Kéïta, Bamako
- Stade Abdoulaye Makoro Cissoko, Kayes
- Stade Baréma Bocoum, Mopti
- Stade Amari Daou, Ségou
- Stade Babemba Traoré, Sikasso

=== Mauritania ===
- Stade Olympique, Nouakchott

=== Mauritius ===
- Stade Anjalay, Belle Vue Maurel
- Stade George V, Curepipe

=== Mayotte ===
- Stade Cavani, Mamoudzou

=== Morocco ===
- Stade de Tanger, Tanger
- National Cricket Stadium, Tangier
- Stade de Marchan, Tangier
- Stade d'Agadir, Agadir
- Stade Al Inbiaâte, Agadir
- Stade Moulay Rachid, Laayoune
- Stade Cheikh Laaghdef, Laayoune
- Stade Complexe Sportif, Fez
- Salle 11th November, Fez
- Honor Stadium, Oujda
- Stade de Marrakech, Marrakesh
- Stade El Harti, Marrakesh
- Hassan II Stadium, Casablanca
- Stade Larbi Benbarek, Casablanca
- Stade Larbi Zaouli, Casablanca
- Stade Mohammed V, Casablanca
- Salle Mohammed V, Casablanca
- Stade Sidi Bernoussi, Casablanca
- Stade Pere Jego, Casablanca
- Stade Moulay Abdellah, Rabat
- Stade Marche Verte, Rabat
- Salle Ibn Yassine, Rabat
- Salle Moulay Abdellah, Rabat
- Stade de FUS, Rabat
- Stade d'Honneur (Meknes), Meknes
- Saniat Rmel, Tétouan
- Stade Municipal (Kenitra), Kenitra
- Stade El Abdi, El Jadida
- Stade El Bachir, Mohammédia, Mohammedia
- Stade Mimoun Al Arsi, Al Hoceima
- Stade Boubker Ammar, Salé
- Stade El Massira, Safi
- Complexe OCP, Khouribga
- Stade du 18 novembre, Khemisset

=== Mozambique ===
- Estádio do Costa do Sol, Maputo
- Estádio da Machava, Maputo
- Estádio do Maxaquene, Maputo
- Estádio do Zimpeto, Maputo
- Estádio Matateu, Maputo

=== Namibia ===
- Independence Stadium, Windhoek
- Sam Nujoma Stadium, Windhoek

=== Niger ===
- Général Seyni Kountché Stadion, Niamey

=== Nigeria ===
- Abuja Stadium, Abuja
- Ahmadou Bello Stadium, Kaduna
- Enyimba International Stadium, Aba
- Gateway Stadium, Abeokuta
- Jalingo City Stadium, Jalingo City
- Obafemi Awolowo Stadium
- Liberation Stadium, Port Harcourt
- Nnamdi Azikiwe Stadium' Enugu
- Omoku Township Stadium, Omoku
- Lagos National Stadium, Lagos
- Samuel Ogbemudia Stadium' Benin City
- Sani Abacha Stadium' Kano
- Sharks Stadium, Port Harcourt
- Teslim Balogun Stadium, Surlere, Lagos
- UJ Esuene Stadium' Calabar
- Warri Township Stadium, Warri
- Godswill Akpabio International Stadium, Uyo

=== Réunion ===
- Stade de l'Est, St. Denis
- Stade Paul Julius Bénard, Saint-Paul

=== Rwanda ===
- Stade Amahoro, Kigali
- Kigali stadium, Kigali
- Huye stadium, Huye
- Ngoma stadium, Ngoma

=== Saint Helena ===
- Francis Plain Playing Field, Francis Plain

=== São Tomé and Príncipe ===
- Estádio Nacional 12 de Julho, São Tomé

=== Senegal ===
- Stade Leopold Senghor, Dakar

=== Seychelles ===
- La Digue Playing Fields, Anse Réunion
- Mount Fleuri Stadium, Mount Fleuri
- Stade Linité, Roche Caiman
- Stade d'Amitié, Praslin

=== Sierra Leone ===
- National Stadium, Freetown

=== Somalia ===
- Eng.Yariisow Stadium, Mogadishu
- Mogadiscio Stadium, Mogadiscio
- Hargeisa Stadium, Hargeisa
- Alamzey Stadium, Burao
- Mayor Abdalla Stadium, Berbera
- Qoobdooro Stadium, Karaan Banaadir

=== South Sudan ===
- Juba Stadium, Juba

=== Sudan ===
- Khartoum Stadium, Khartoum

=== Eswatini (Swaziland) ===
- Somhlolo National Stadium, Lobamba

=== Tanzania ===
- Amaan Stadium, Zanzibar
- Benjamin Mkapa National Stadium, Dar es Salaam
- CCM Kirumba Stadium, Mwanza
- Lake Tanganyika Stadium, Kigoma
- National Stadium, Dar es Salaam

=== Togo ===
- Stade de Kégué, Lomé

=== Tunisia ===
- Stade 7 November, Rades
- Stade El Menzah, Tunis
- Stade Olympique de Sousse, Sousse
- Stade Mustapha Ben Jannet, Monastir
- Stade Taieb Mhiri, Sfax
- Stade 15 Octobre, Bizerte
- Stade Chedli Zouiten, Tunis
- Stade Bou Kornine, Hammam Lif
- Stade Municipal de Gabès, Gabès
- Stade Abdelaziz Chtioui, La Marsa
- Stade Municipal de Jendouba, Jendouba
- Stade Ali Zouaoui, Kairouan
- Stade 7 Novembre du Kef, El Kef
- Stade du 7 Novembre de Gafsa, Gafsa
- Stade Jlidi, Zarzis
- Stade Hedi Ennaifer, Le Bardo
- Stade Olympique (Beja), Béja
- Stade de Kasserine, Kasserine
- Stade du 7-Mars, Ben Guerdane
- Stade Nejib Khattab, Tataouine
- Stade Municipal de Métlaoui, Métlaoui
- Stade Ameur El-Gargouri, Sfax

=== Uganda ===
- Hoima City Stadium, Hoima
- Mandela National Stadium, Kampala
- Mbale Municipal; Stadium, Mbale
- Pece Stadium, Gulu
- St. Mary's Stadium-Kitende, Entebbe

=== Western Sahara ===
- Stade El Aaiún, El Aaiún

=== Zambia ===
- National Heroes Stadium, Lusaka
- Independence Stadium, Lusaka
- Levy Mwanawasa Stadium, Ndola

=== Zimbabwe ===
- Barbourfields Stadium, Bulawayo
- National Sports Stadium, Harare
- Rufaro Stadium, Harare

== Gallery ==
African stadiums

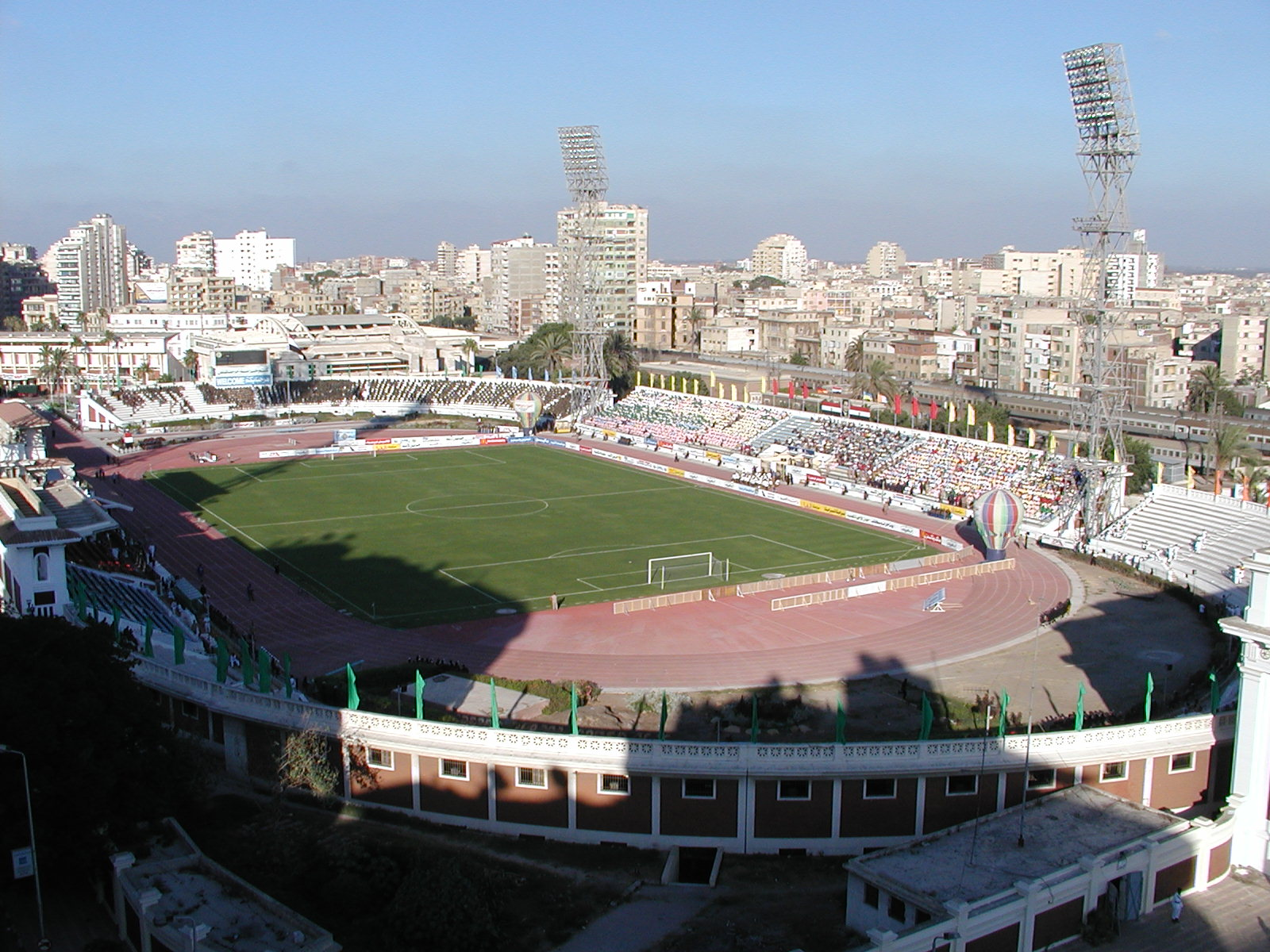
Alexandria Stadium

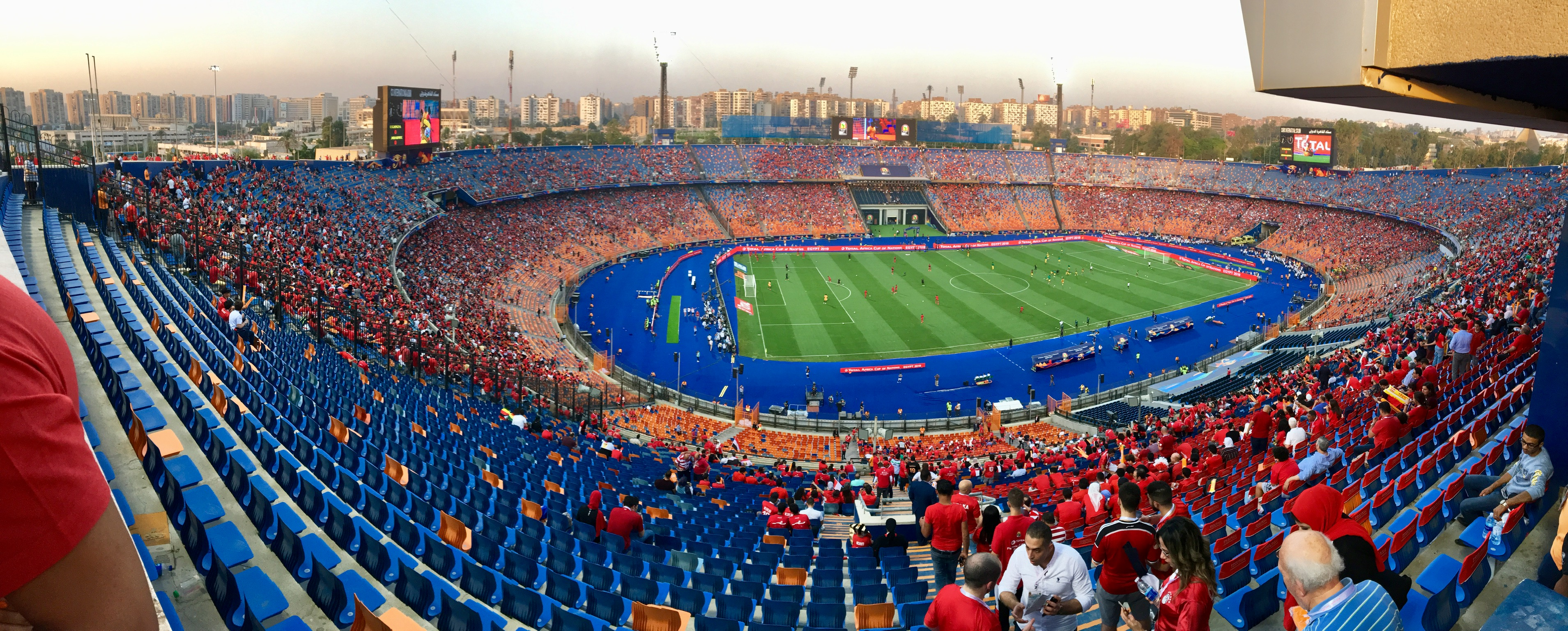
Cairo International Stadium

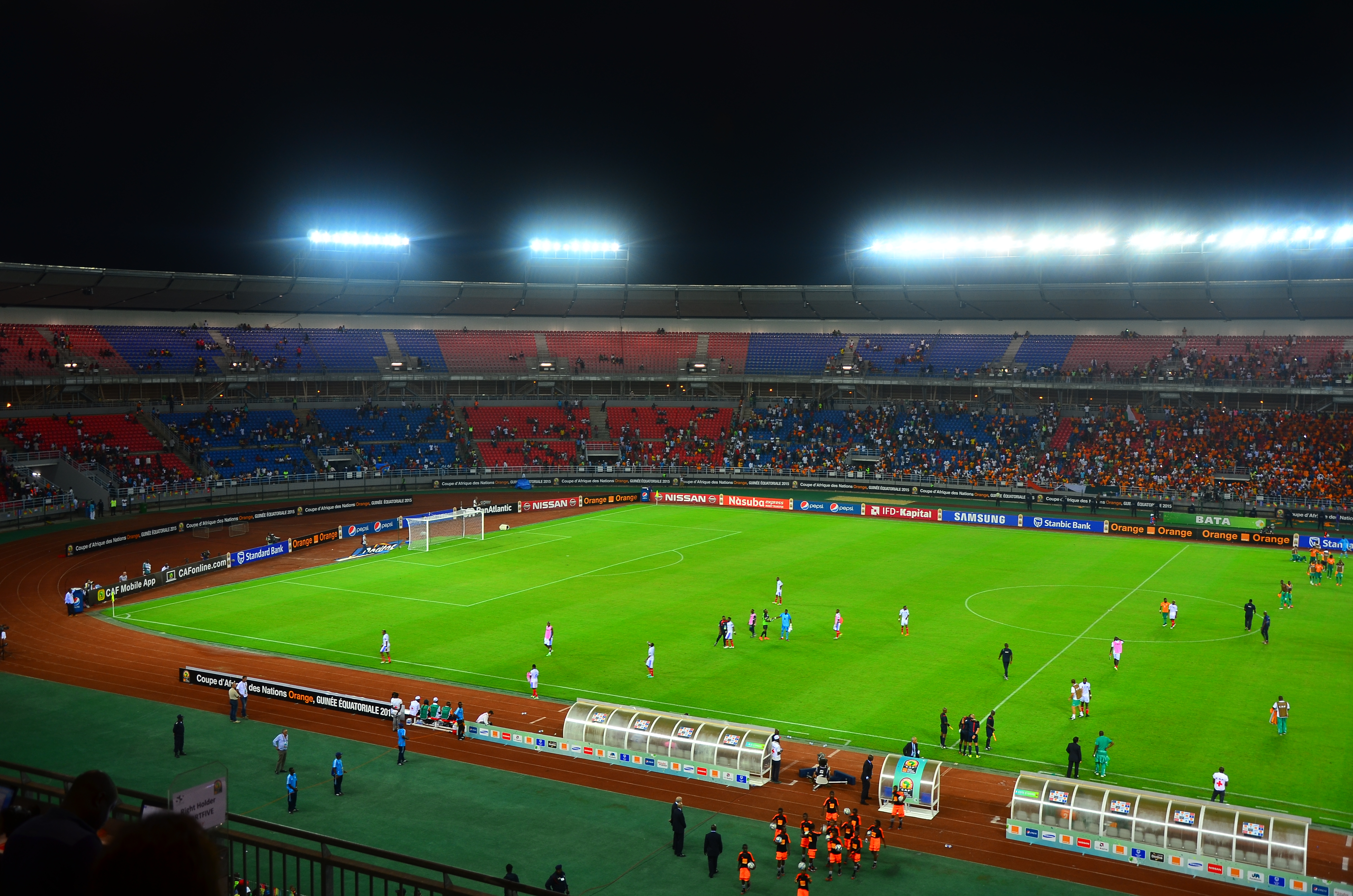
Estadio de Bata

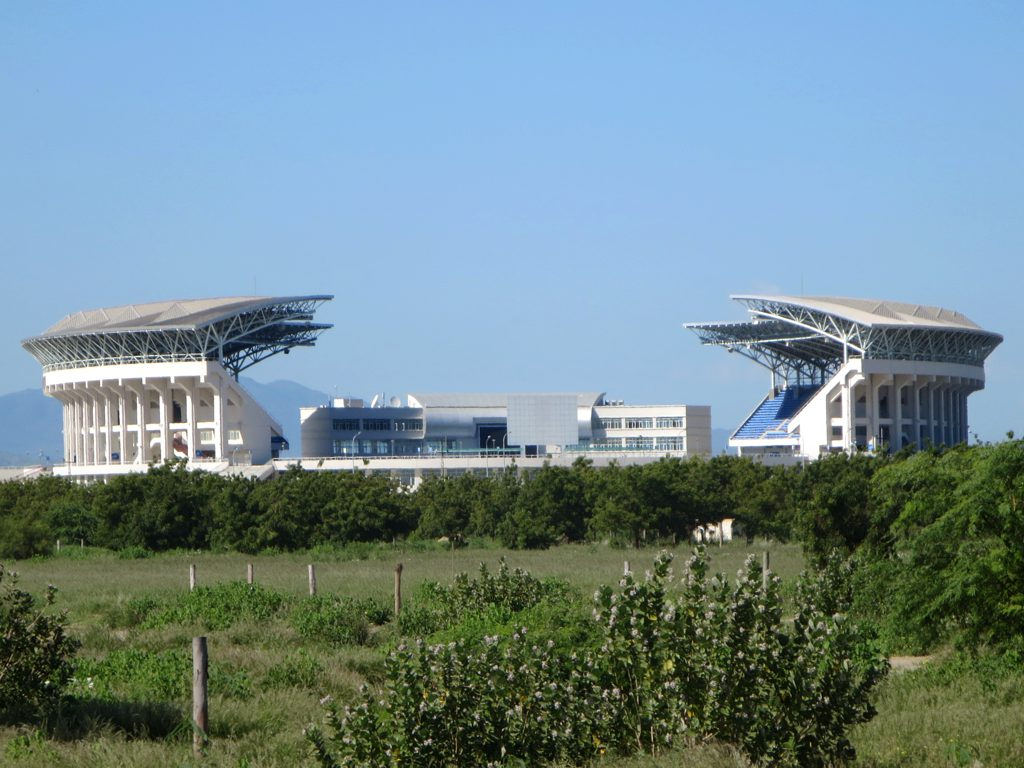
Estádio Nacional de Ombaka

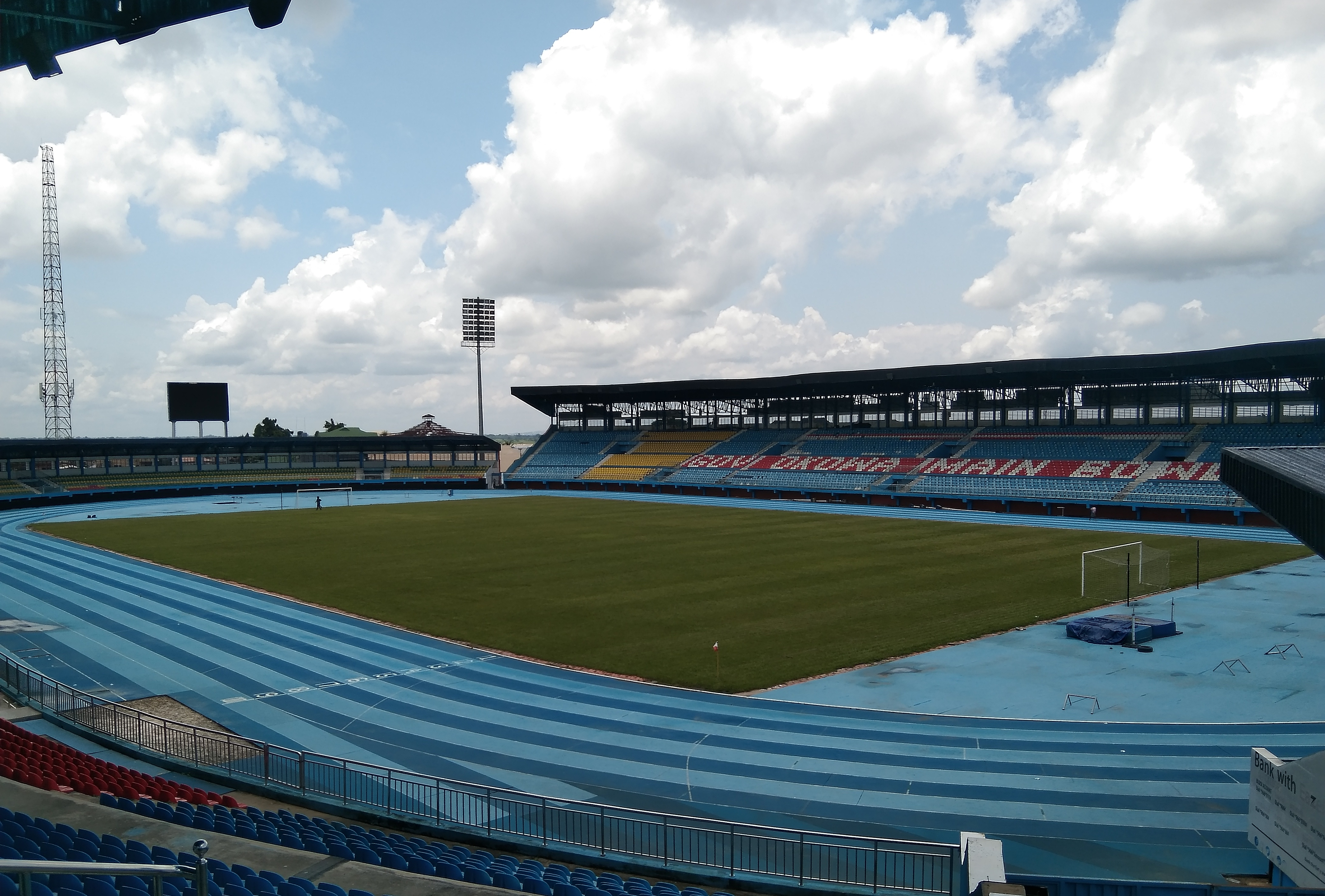
Governor Okowa Main Bowl

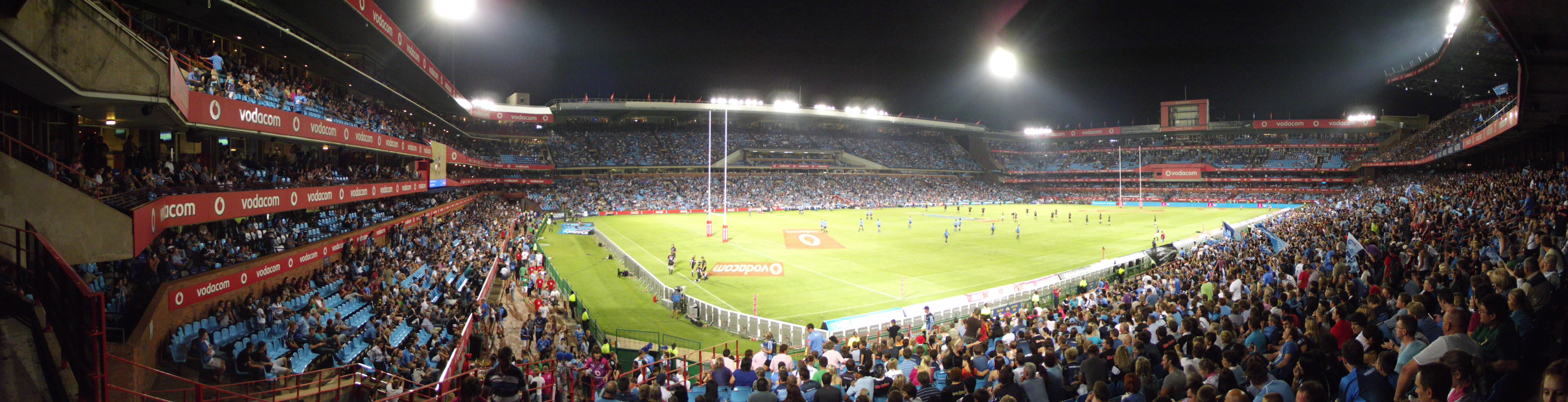
Loftus Versfeld Stadium

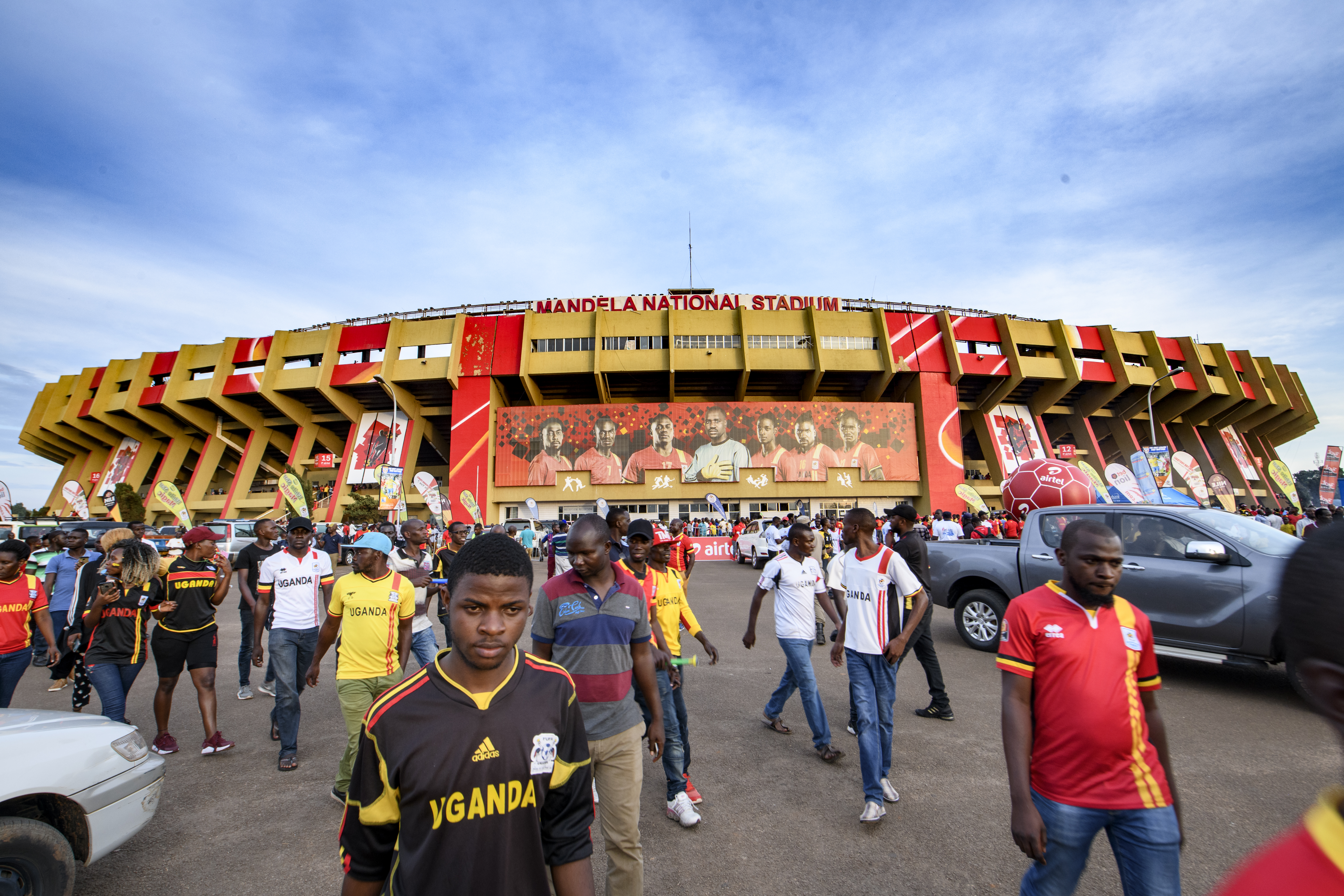
Mandela National Stadium

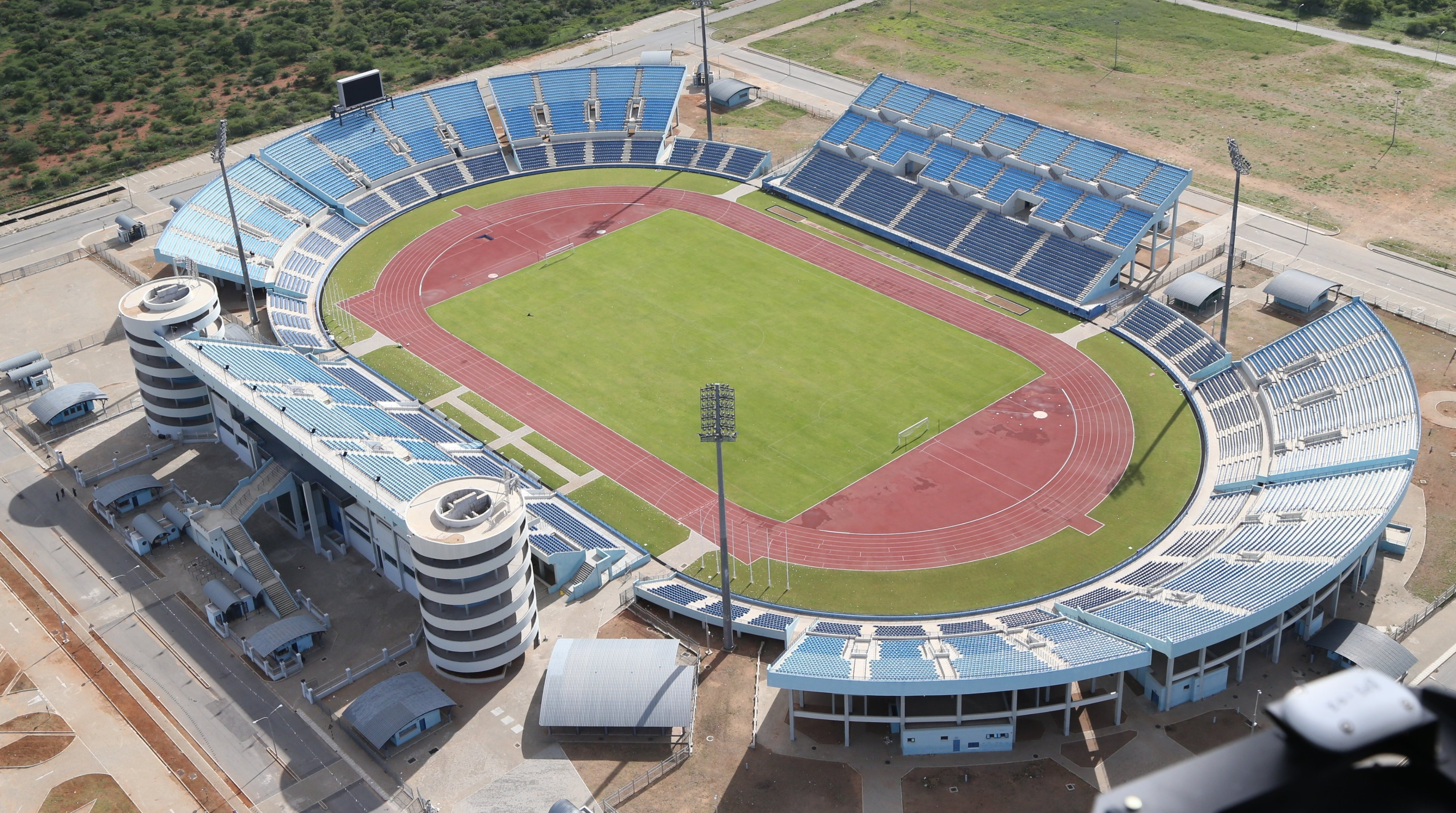
Obed Itani Chilume Stadium

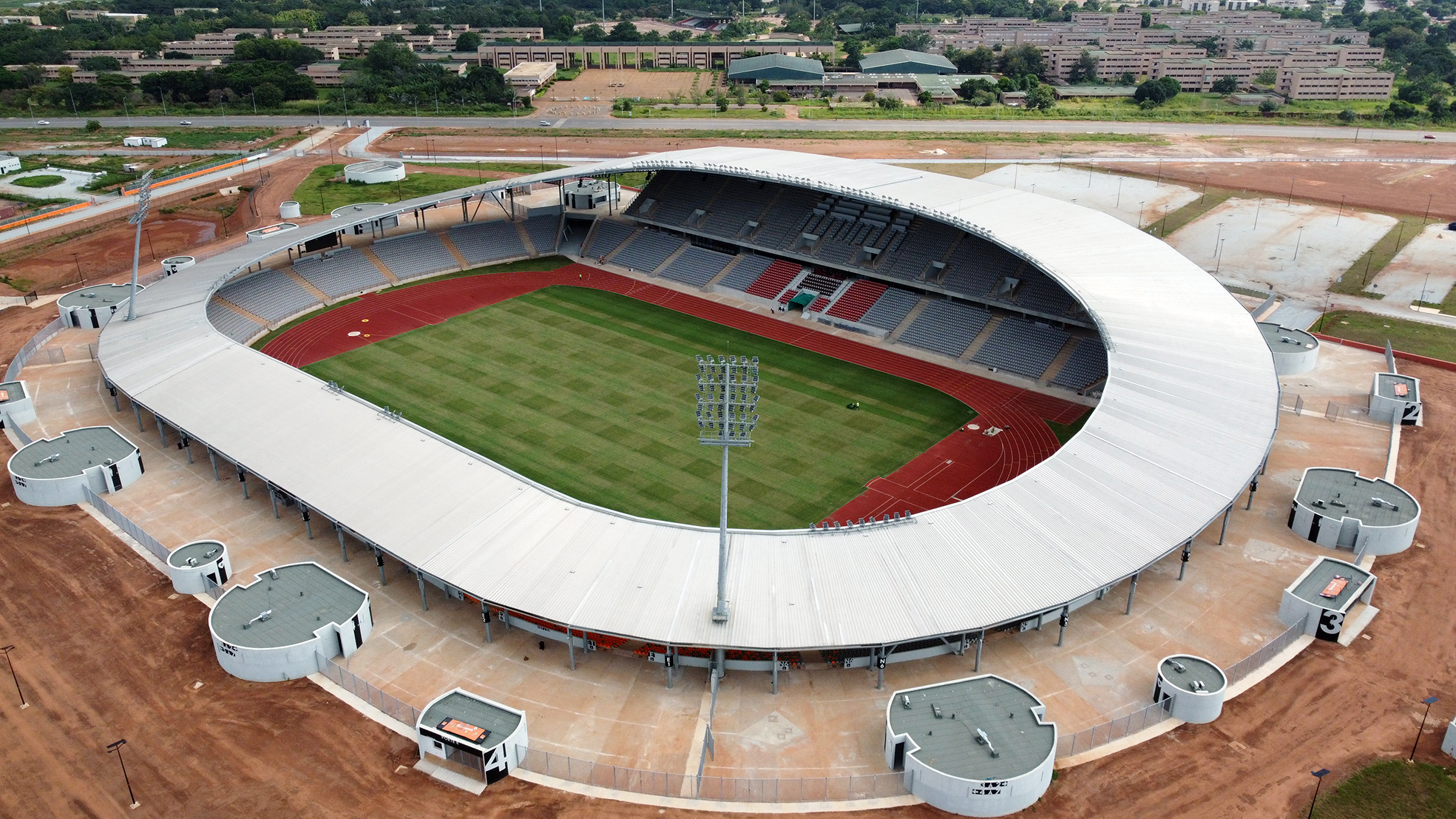
Stade Charles-Konan-Banny

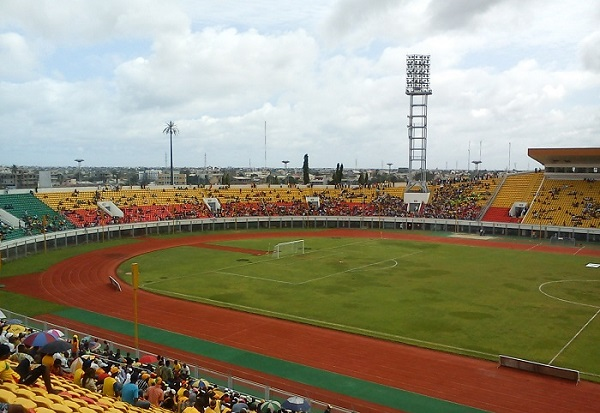
Stade de l'Amitié

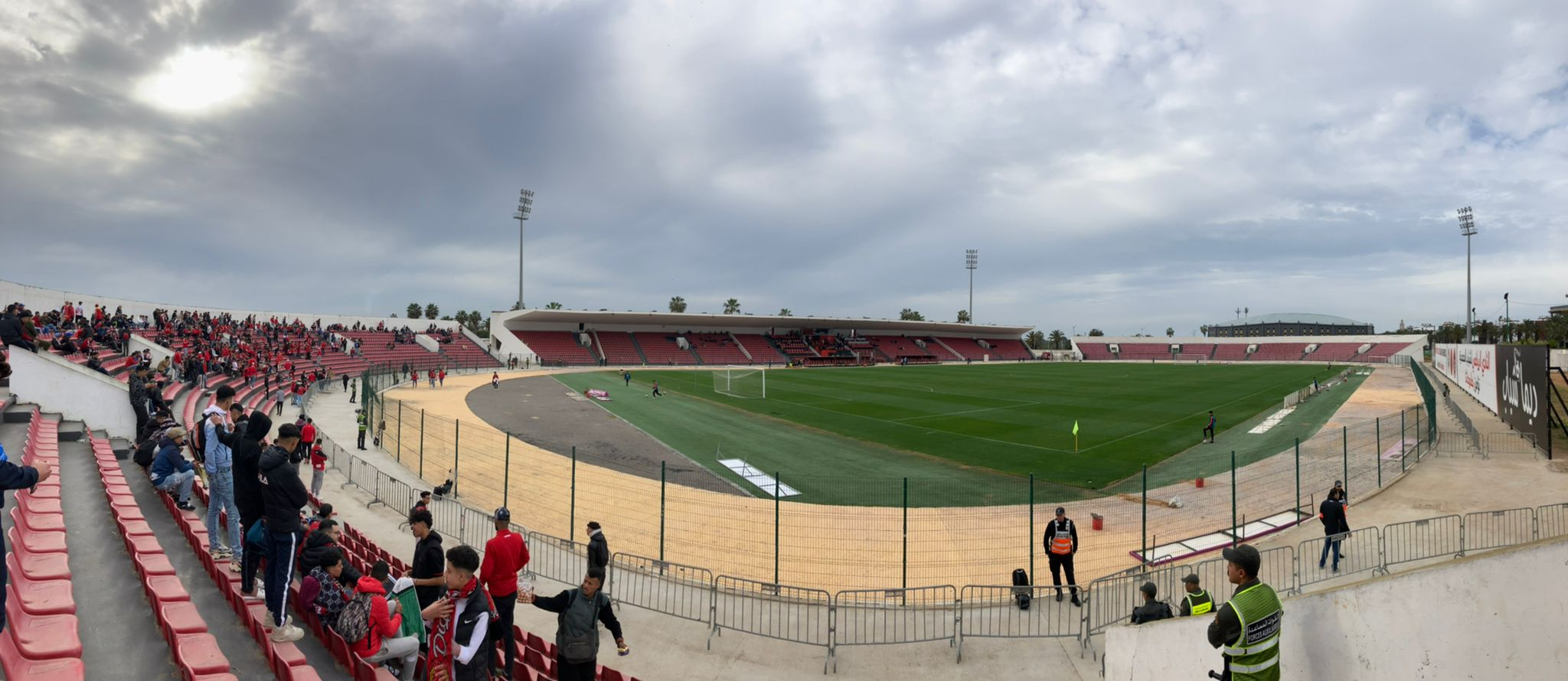
Stade El-Bachir

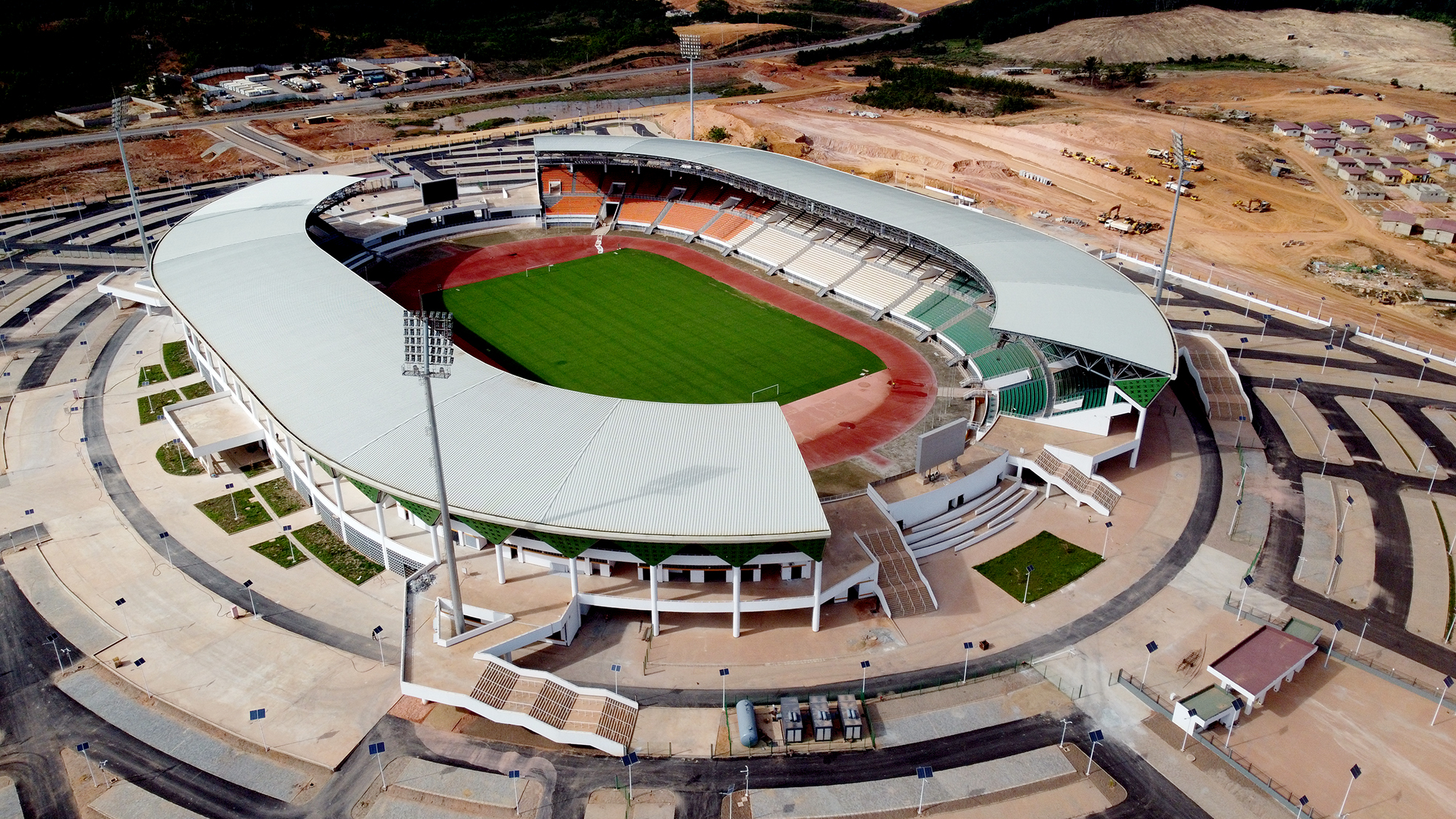
Stade Laurent-Pokou

== See also ==
- List of stadiums in Asia
- List of stadiums in Central America and the Caribbean
- List of stadiums in Europe
- List of stadiums in North America
- List of stadiums in Oceania
- List of stadiums in South America
- List of African stadiums by capacity
- List of association football stadiums by country
- Lists of stadiums
