= St. Mary's Stadium (Kitende) =

Stadium in Entebbe, Uganda

St. Mary's Stadium-Kitende
- The Venoms' Home
- Interactive map of St. Mary's Stadium-Kitende
- Location: Kitende, Entebbe, Central Region, Uganda
- Coordinates: 0.1986°N 32.5318°E
- Owner: Vipers SC
- Operator: Vipers SC
- Capacity: 20,000 (1,000+ VIP seats)
- Surface: Artificial turf
- Field size: 115 yd × 74 yd (105 m × 68 m)

Construction
- Built: 2017
- Opened: 2017
- Expanded: 2020

Tenant
- Vipers (2017–present)

Website
- viperssc.co.ug

St. Mary's Stadium is a football stadium located in Kitende, Wakiso on the Entebbe Road in Uganda. The stadium serves as the home ground for Vipers SC, a football club competing in Uganda's top division, the Uganda Premier League. Its capacity is 20,000 with more than 1,000 VIP seats.

== History ==
=== Construction and opening ===
The stadium was constructed by Dr. Lawrence Mulindwa, the patron of Vipers SC and former president of the Federation of Uganda Football Associations (FUFA). Construction commenced in 2016, with the stadium officially opening in February 2017.

=== CAF approval ===
On 3 March 2017, the Confederation of African Football (CAF) officially approved St. Mary's Stadium-Kitende to host continental football matches. The approval came after CAF inspector Nicholas Musonye was sent to Uganda to assess the facility. CAF Club Licensing Manager Ahmed Harraz communicated the decision, stating that "CAF has approved the St Mary's Stadium and you can now select as a venue for your matches.

=== Major renovations ===
Following initial CAF concerns about the stadium's suitability for international games, major renovations were undertaken in 2018. The refurbishment included the installation of a state-of-the-art artificial turf to replace the natural grass surface, redesigned dressing rooms, improved dugouts, and enhanced seating arrangements. The renovated facility was officially reopened in September 2018, with Mulindwa describing the project as costing "billions of shillings and millions of dollars."

== Facilities ==
=== Capacity and seating ===
The Stadium has a seating capacity of 20,000, making it Uganda's third-largest stadium after the Mandela National Stadium and Hamz Stadium, Nakivubo War Memorial Grounds. The stadium features over 1,000 VIP seats and is designed as an all-seater facility.

=== Playing surface ===
The stadium features a high-quality artificial turf playing surface, installed during the 2018 renovations. This synthetic pitch replaced the original natural grass and was specifically chosen to meet international standards for continental competitions. It is the second largest stadium in Uganda next to the Mandela National Stadium.

=== Home club ===
The stadium serves as the home ground for Vipers SC, one of Uganda's most successful football clubs. Vipers SC, also known as "The Venoms," have used the facility for both domestic league matches in the Uganda Premier League and continental competitions in the CAF Champions League and CAF Confederation Cup. The national team has relocated to the stadium after the Mandela National Stadium was blacklisted by FIFA and CAF in 2020.

=== Location ===
The stadium is situated in Kitende, along the Entebbe Road, approximately 25 kilometers from Kampala, Uganda's capital city. Its strategic location provides convenient access for fans traveling from both Kampala and Entebbe.

== Other stadiums in Uganda ==
The St. Mary’s Stadium is currently the third largest stadium in Uganda.

Stadium	Date built	Capacity	Tenant/use
Mandela National Stadium	1997	45,202	Uganda national football team
Hamz Stadium, Nakivubo War Memorial Grounds	1926	35,000	Several clubs
St. Mary's Stadium	2017	20,000	Vipers SC

== See also ==
- List of African stadiums by capacity
- List of stadiums in Africa
