= Mandela National Stadium =

Stadium in Kampala, Uganda

- "The Home of the Cranes"; Namboole
- CAF

- Location within Uganda
- Full name: Mandela National Stadium
- Former names: Namboole National Stadium (1997–2013)
- Location: Bweyogerere; Kira Municipality; Central Region; Uganda
- Coordinates: 00°20′52″N 32°39′33″E
- Owner: Government of Uganda
- Operator: Mandela National Stadium Limited
- Capacity: 64,125 (planned) Former capacity List: 45,202 (1997–2024); 45,000 (2024–2026)
- Roof: Canopy
- Surface: GrassMaster
- Record attendance: Football: 50,000 (Uganda vs South Africa, 10 October 2004); Concert: 45,202 (Lucky Dube, 8 December 1997)
- Field size: 104 yd × 68 yd (95 m × 62 m)

Construction
- Built: 1993–1997
- Opened: 6 December 1997; 28 years ago
- Renovated: 2010–2011, 2022–2024, 2026–present
- Expanded: 2026–present
- Cost: US$36 Million
- Services engineer: Peter Kidemuka
- Main contractor: China Railway Seventh Group

Tenants
- Uganda national football team (1997–2020, 2024–present); Uganda Revenue Authority (2017–2020)

Website
- Homepage

Mandela National Stadium, also known as Namboole Stadium, is a multi-purpose stadium in Uganda. It is named after the former South African President and anti-apartheid icon, Nelson Mandela. The stadium's record attendance of 50,000 was set on the 10 October 2004, in a football match between the national football teams of Uganda and South Africa.

== Location ==
The stadium is located on Namboole Hill in Kira Municipality, Wakiso District. The stadium is approximately 11 kilometres (7 mi), by road, east of the central business district of Kampala, Uganda's capital and largest city.

== Overview ==
Mandela National Stadium is mainly used for football matches, although other sports such as athletics are also practised. The stadium had a capacity of 45,202 in 2016 before renovation. After renovation in May 2024 which involved putting permanent seats, the capacity decreased to 45,000. The stadium is home to the Uganda national football team, known as the Uganda Cranes, and has also been home at points to national league champions, Uganda Revenue Authority and Police FC.

The stadium was built with a grant of US$36 million from the People's Republic of China (PRC). Originally known as Namboole Stadium, it derived its name from the hill on which it was built. It was later renamed Mandela National Stadium, in honour of former South African president, Nelson Mandela. Locals however still call it Namboole Stadium. The stadium officially opened in 1997 with a concert by South African reggae artist Lucky Dube.

The stadium was refurbished in 2010–11, with a US$2.8 million grant from the PRC.

A committee of the Ugandan parliament reported in 2015 that the stadium was on the verge of financial collapse, claiming that the stadium had suffered from more than a decade of "mismanagement and wanton abuse" and incurred losses totalling UGX:3.6 billion. Running the stadium profitably in a private-public partnership arrangement remains a challenge.

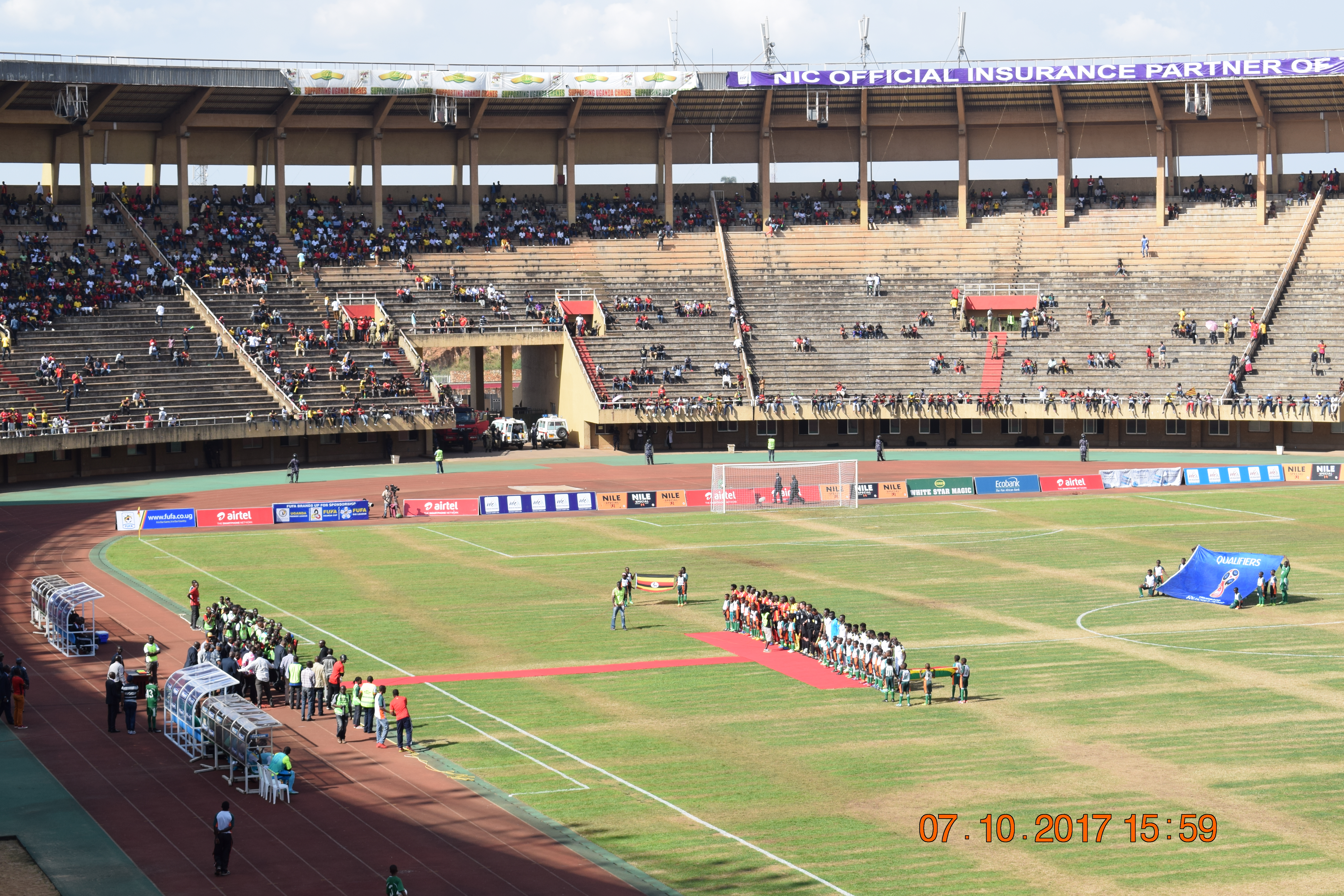
Mandela National Stadium prior to redevelopment

The Mandela National Stadium was closed for renovation in 2019 after the outbreak of COVID-19 after it failed to reach the minimum standards required by the Confederation of African Football (CAF) to host international matches. In 2020, the stadium was blacklisted from hosting football games due to its substandard condition. Reconstruction works, undertaken by the UPDF Engineering Brigade, began in 2022, and included the installation of a permanent seats in the stadium, new dressing rooms, a modern scoreboard, as well as the refurbishment of floodlights and the pitch. The renovation of between 2019 and 2024 cost 97 billion Uganda Shillings. After its renovation, the Federation Of Uganda Football Association (FUFA) organized test matches from the Uganda premier League to serve as test events of the stadium before the official opening. The games were played on 1 May 2024 where BUL FC hosted Vipers SC, and KCCA FC hosted SC Villa which served as a requirement for the Confederation Of African Football (CAF) to grant the stadium permission to host International Games. A month later, Uganda Cranes returned at Namboole hosting Botswana in the World Cup qualifiers and Algeria a week after. At the start of 2024–25 Uganda Premier League Season, SC Villa registered Mandela National Stadium to serve as their home ground.

In September 2025, the stadium was closed down for renovations after hosting the 2024 African Nations Championship. The ongoing improvements include the expansion of the seating capacity to 64,125. Other improvements include an Olympic-sized swimming pool, an indoor multi-purpose arena, and a fully covered roof, among other facilities. The EPC contractor for these renovations is Summa Construction Company based in Turkey, who constructed Hoima National Stadium. The stadium is expected to re-open in time for the 2027 Africa Cup of Nations, that is planned to be hosted by Kenya, Tanzania and Uganda.

== Gallery ==

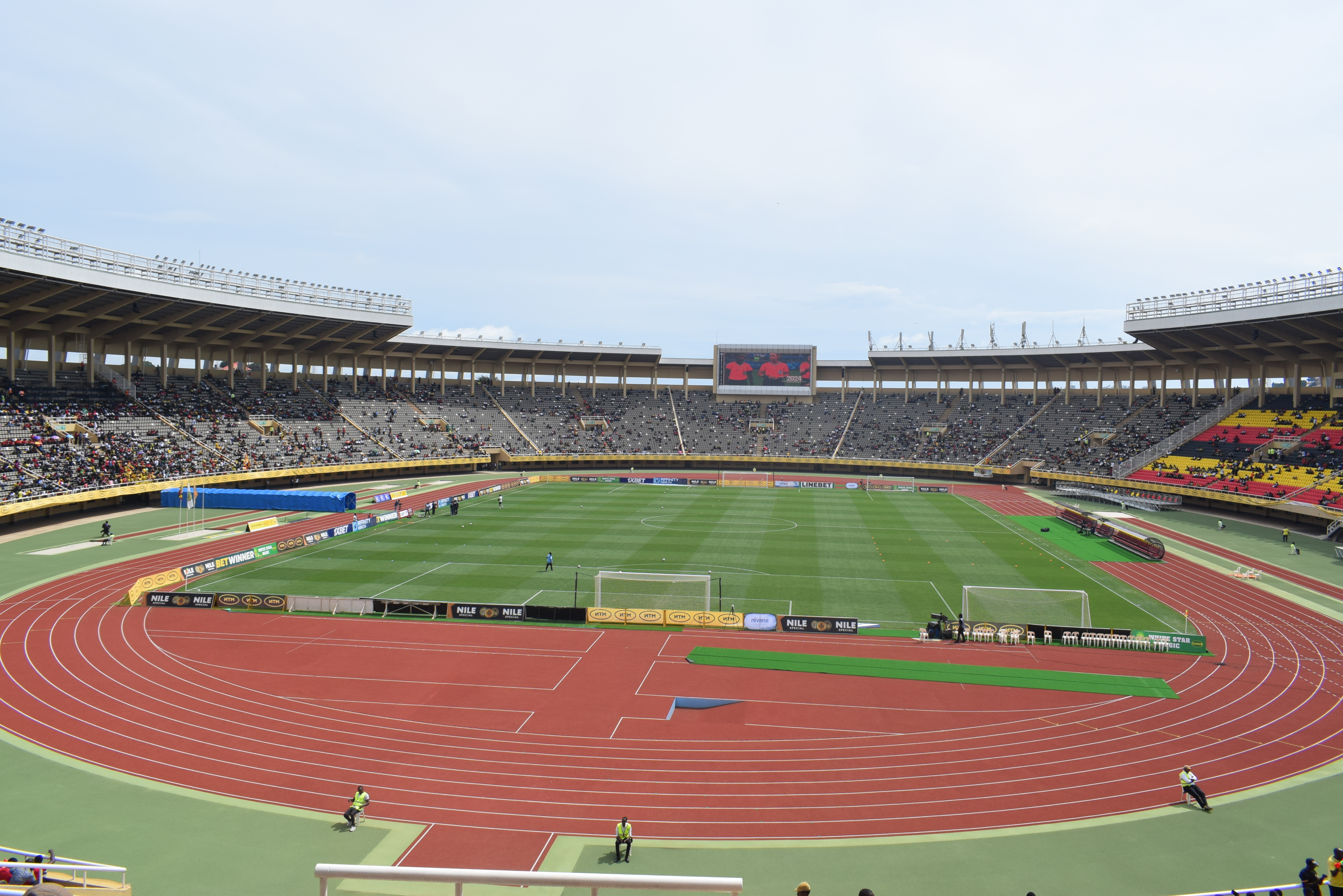

== See also ==
- List of football stadiums in Uganda
- List of African stadiums by capacity
- Lists of stadiums
