= Entebbe UPPC =

Association football club in Uganda

Entebbe UPPC Football Club
- Full name: Entebbe UPPC Football Club
- Nickname: The Printers
- Founded: June 2024
- Stadium: Bugonga fisheries grounds, Entebbe
- Capacity: 3,000
- President: Ms. Sarah Nabirye
- Manager: Abdallah Mubiru
- League: Uganda Premier League
- Website: https://uppcfc.go.ug/
Home colours	Away colours

Entebbe UPPC FC (formerly Gadaffi FC) is a Ugandan football club based in Entebbe currently playing in the Uganda Premier League. They play their home games at Bugonga Fisheries Grounds Arena located in Entebbe The club is nicknamed as The Soldier Boys. Entebbe UPPC is owned by Lt Col Edrine Ochieng, who also doubles as the club's Chairman.

== History ==
Gaddafi FC was founded in 2017, but unveiled in 2019 by a group of UPDF officers attached to Gaddafi barracks. The club was promoted to the Uganda Premier League in the 2021/2022 season.

In 2022, the club changed its name to Gaddafi Modern FC, though later in the same year retained its original name (Gaddafi FC).

In 2025, the club changed its name to Entebbe UPPC FC after a complete take over by the UPPC Staff Association in 2024.
