= List of African stadiums by capacity =

The following is a list of sports stadiums in Africa. They are in order by their capacity, that is the maximum number of spectators the stadium can accommodate. Most large stadiums in Africa are used for football (soccer), with some also used for athletics and rugby union. African stadiums with a capacity of 30,000 or more are included. Soccer City in Johannesburg is currently the largest stadium in Africa since its capacity was increased to 94,700 for the 2010 FIFA World Cup. This event, which took place in June–July, was the first time an African country has hosted the World Cup. The Olympic Games have never been staged in Africa.

== Current stadiums ==
Rank	Stadium	Capacity	City	Country	Tenants	Images
1	FNB Stadium	94,736	Johannesburg	South Africa	South Africa national football team, Kaizer Chiefs	
2	Misr Stadium	93,940	The New Capital	Egypt	Egypt national football team	
3	Borg El-Arab Stadium	86,000	Alexandria	Egypt	Egypt national football team	
4	Stade des Martyrs de la Pentecôte	80,000	Kinshasa	DR Congo	DR Congo national football team	
5	Ibn Batouta Stadium	75,600	Tangier	Morocco	Morocco national football team, Ittihad Tanger	
6	Cairo International Stadium	75,000	Cairo	Egypt	Egypt national football team, Al Ahly, Zamalek	
7	Prince Moulay Abdellah Stadium	68,700	Rabat	Morocco	Morocco national football team, AS FAR	
8	Kamuzu Stadium	65,000	Blantyre	Malawi	Malawi national football team	
9	Garoonka Muqdisho	65,000	Mogadishu	Somalia	Somalia national football team, Moqadishu,	
10	Stade Hammadi Agrebi	65,000	Radès	Tunisia	Tunisia national football team, Club Africain, Espérance de Tunis	
11	Stade du 5 Juillet	64,200	Algiers	Algeria	Algeria national football team, MC Alger, USM Alger, CR Belouizdad, Paradou AC	
12	Ellis Park Stadium	62,567	Johannesburg	South Africa	Lions, Golden Lions, South Africa national rugby team	
13	Abuja Stadium	60,491	Abuja	Nigeria	Nigeria national football team	
14	Alassane Ouattara Stadium	60,000	Abidjan	Côte d'Ivoire	Côte d'Ivoire national football team	
15	Stade Municipal de Kintélé	60,000	Brazzaville	Congo	Congo national football team	
16	Stade Tata Raphaël	60,000	Kinshasa	DR Congo	AS Vita Club, DC Motema Pembe	
17	National Stadium	60,000	Dar es Salaam	Tanzania	Tanzania national football team	
18	Olembe Stadium	60,000	Yaoundé	Cameroon	Cameroon national football team	
19	Heroes National Stadium	60,000	Lusaka	Zambia	Zambia national football team	
20	National Sports Stadium	60,000	Harare	Zimbabwe		
21	Rufaro Stadium	60,000	Harare	Zimbabwe	CAPS United; Dynamos; Herentals	
22	19 May 1956 Stadium	56,000	Annaba	Algeria	USM Annaba	
23	Cape Town Stadium	55,000	Cape Town	South Africa	Stormers, Western Province, South Africa national rugby team, Cape Town City	
24	Moses Mabhida Stadium	55,500	Durban	South Africa	AmaZulu	
25	Kasarani Stadium	55,000	Nairobi	Kenya	Kenya national football team	
26	Kings Park Stadium	52,000	Durban	South Africa	Sharks, Sharks (Currie Cup), South Africa national rugby team	
27	Loftus Versfeld Stadium	51,762	Pretoria	South Africa	Mamelodi Sundowns, Bulls, Blue Bulls, South Africa national rugby team	
28	Newlands Stadium	51,100 (closed since 2020)	Cape Town	South Africa		
29	Stade Hocine-Ait Ahmed	50,766	Tizi Ouzou	Algeria	Algeria national football team, JS Kabylie	
30	Stade Général Seyni Kountché	50,000	Niamey	Niger	Niger national football team, Sahel SC	
31	Estádio 11 de Novembro	50,000	Luanda	Angola	Angola national football team, Petro Luanda	
32	Japoma Stadium	50,000	Douala	Cameroon		
33	Estádio da Cidadela	50,000	Luanda	Angola	Petro Atletico, Sport Luanda e Benfica, Clube Desportivo Primeiro de Agosto	
34	Stade Olympique de Sousse	50,000	Sousse	Tunisia	Étoile du Sahel	
35	Stade Abdoulaye Wade	50,000	Dakar	Senegal	Senegal national football team	
36	Stade du 26-mars	50,000	Bamako	Mali	Mali national football team, Stade Malien	
37	Levy Mwanawasa Stadium	49,800	Ndola	Zambia	Zambia national football team, ZESCO United	
38	Nelson Mandela Bay Stadium	48,459	Port Elizabeth	South Africa	Eastern Province Elephants, South Africa Sevens	
39	Peter Mokaba Stadium	46,000	Polokwane	South Africa	South Africa national football team	
40	Free State Stadium	46,000	Bloemfontein	South Africa	Cheetahs, Free State Cheetahs, South Africa national rugby team	
41	Amahoro Stadium	45,508	Kigali	Rwanda	Amavubi	
42	Adrar Stadium	45,480	Agadir	Morocco	Hassania Agadir	
43	Marrakesh Stadium	45,240	Marrakesh	Morocco	KAC Marrakech	
44	Mandela National Stadium	45,202	Kampala	Uganda	Uganda national football team	
45	Fez Stadium	45,000	Fes	Morocco	Maghreb de Fès	
46	Tripoli Stadium	45,000	Tripoli	Libya	Libya national football team, Al-Ahly, Al-Ittihad, Al-Madina	
47	24 February Stadium	45,000	Sidi Bel Abbes	Algeria	USM Bel Abbès	
48	Egyptian Army Stadium	45,000	Suez	Egypt	Petrojet	
49	Estádio da Machava	45,000	Maputo	Mozambique	Mozambique national football team	
50	Stade Mohammed V	45,000	Casablanca	Morocco	Morocco national football team, Raja CA, Wydad AC	
51	Mbombela Stadium	43,500	Mbombela	South Africa	Pumas (Currie Cup)	
52	Al-Merrikh Stadium	43,000	Omdurman	Sudan	Sudan national football team, Al-Merrikh	
53	Ahmadou Ahidjo Stadium	42,500	Yaoundé	Cameroon	Canon Yaoundé, Tonnerre Yaoundé	
54	Estádio do Zimpeto	42,000	Maputo	Mozambique	2011 All-Africa Games	
55	Benghazi International Stadium	42,000	Benghazi	Libya	Libya national football team, Al-Ahly, Al-Nasr, Al-Tahaddy	
56	Royal Bafokeng Stadium	42,000	Rustenburg	South Africa	Platinum Stars	
57	Nelson Mandela Stadium	40,784	Baraki	Algeria	Algeria national football team	
58	Baba Yara Stadium	40,528	Kumasi	Ghana	Asante Kotoko, King Faisal Babes	
59	Miloud Hadefi Stadium	40,143	Oran	Algeria	Algeria national football team, MC Oran	
60	Bingu National Stadium	40,090	Lilongwe	Malawi	Malawi national football team	
61	Barbourfields Stadium	40,000	Bulawayo	Zimbabwe	Highlanders FC	
62	Stade Leopold Senghor	40,000	Dakar	Senegal	Senegal national football team, ASC Jeanne d'Arc	
63	Ali La Pointe Stadium	40,000	Algiers	Algeria	MC Alger	
64	Ahmed Zabana Stadium	40,000	Oran	Algeria	Algeria national rugby team	
65	CCM Kirumba Stadium	40,000	Mwanza	Tanzania	Toto African	
66	Accra Sports Stadium	40,000	Accra	Ghana	Accra Hearts of Oak Sporting Club, Great Olympics	
67	Stade d'Angondjé	40,000	Libreville	Gabon	Gabon national football team	
68	Stade de la Paix	40,000	Bouaké	Côte d'Ivoire	ASC Bouaké	
69	Orlando Stadium	40,000	Soweto	South Africa	Orlando Pirates	
70	Tigray Stadium	40,000	Mekelle	Ethiopia	Mekelle 70 Enderta, Shire Endaselassie, Dedebit	
71	Bahir Dar Stadium	40,000	Bahir Dar	Ethiopia	Ethiopia national football team	
72	Hawassa Kenema Stadium	40,000	Hawassa	Ethiopia	Hawassa City	
73	Reunification Stadium	39,000	Douala	Cameroon	Union Douala, Les Astres FC	
74	Adokiye Amiesimaka Stadium	38,000	Port Harcourt	Nigeria	Dolphins FC	
75	Johannesburg Stadium	37,500	Johannesburg	South Africa	Orlando Pirates	
76	National Stadium	36,000	Freetown	Sierra Leone	Sierra Leone national football team, East End Lions, Mighty Blackpool, Ports Authority	
77	Estadio de Bata	35,700	Bata	Equatorial Guinea	Equatorial Guinea national football team	
78	Rouibah Hocine Stadium	35,000	Jijel	Algeria	JS Djijel	
79	Stade Général Aboubacar Sangoulé Lamizana	35,000	Bobo-Dioulasso	Burkina Faso	Association Sportive des Fonctionnaires de Bobo, Racing Club de Bobo	
80	Osman Ahmed Osman Stadium	35,000	Cairo	Egypt	Al-Mokawloon al-Arab	
81	Charles Mopeli Stadium	35,000	Phuthaditjhaba	South Africa	Free State Stars	
82	Stade Modibo Kéïta	35,000	Bamako	Mali	AS Real Bamako	
83	Muhammadu Dikko Stadium	35,000	Katsina	Nigeria	Katsina United	
84	Estádio Nacional de Ombaka	35,000	Benguela	Angola	Primeiro de Maio	
85	Addis Ababa Stadium	35,000	Addis Ababa	Ethiopia	St. George, Ethiopian Coffee, Ethiopia national football team	
86	Peace Park Stadium	35,000	Makamba	Burundi	Aigle Noir Makamba FC	
87	Wanderers Stadium	34,000	Johannesburg	South Africa	Highveld Lions cricket team, Transvaal cricket team, South Africa national cricket team	
88	Athlone Stadium	34,000	Cape Town	South Africa	Chippa United, Santos Cape Town	
89	Stade Alphonse Massemba-Débat	33,037	Brazzaville	Congo	CARA Brazzaville, Etoile du Congo	
90	Stade Félix Houphouët-Boigny	33,000	Abidjan	Côte d'Ivoire	ASEC Mimosas (some games)	
91	Estadio Gran Canaria	32,392	Las Palmas	Spain	UD Las Palmas	
92	Olympia Stadium	32,000	Rustenburg	South Africa	South Africa national football team, South Africa national rugby team	
93	20 August 1955 Stadium	30,000	Skikda	Algeria	JSM Skikda	
94	Ahmed Kaïd Stadium	30,000	Tiaret	Algeria	JSM Tiaret	
95	Tahar Zoughari Stadium	30,000	Relizane	Algeria	RC Relizane	
96	Godswill Akpabio International Stadium	30,000	Uyo	Nigeria	Nigeria national football team, Akwa United	
97	Jalingo City Stadium	30,000	Jalingo	Nigeria	Taraba FC	
98	Kambarage Stadium	30,000	Shinyanga	Tanzania	Kahama United	
99	Rand Stadium	30,000	Johannesburg	South Africa	South Africa national football team, Kaizer Chiefs	
100	Stade Municipal	30,000	Ouagadougou	Burkina Faso	Santos Football Club	
101	Jamhuri Stadium	30,000	Dodoma	Tanzania	JKT Ruvu Stars	
102	Beni Ebeid Stadium	30,000	Beni Ebeid	Egypt	Beni Ebeid	
103	Al-Ahly WE al-Salam Stadium	30,000	Cairo	Egypt	El-Entag el-Harby	
104	30 June Stadium	30,000	Cairo	Egypt	Egypt national football team, Pyramids FC	
105	Independence Stadium	30,000	Lusaka	Zambia	Green Buffaloes, Zambia national football team	
106	Maji-Maji Stadium	30,000	Songea	Tanzania		
107	Hargeisa Stadium	30,000	Hargeisa	Somalia		

== See also ==
- List of Asian stadiums by capacity
- List of European stadiums by capacity
- List of North American stadiums by capacity
- List of Oceanian stadiums by capacity
- List of South American stadiums by capacity
- List of association football stadiums by country
- Lists of stadiums
- List of future stadiums
- Sport in Africa
