= 2014 African Nations Championship final =

- Event: 2014 African Nations Championship
Libya	Ghana
(Libya)	(Ghana)
0	0
- After extra time Libya won 4–3 on penalties
- Date: 1 February 2014
- Venue: Cape Town Stadium, Cape Town
- Referee: Mohamed Benouza (Algeria)
- Attendance: 16,505

The 2014 African Nations Championship final was a football match that took place on 1 February 2014 at the Cape Town Stadium in Cape Town, South Africa, to determine the winner of the 2014 African Nations Championship. Libya defeated Ghana in the penalty kicks 4–3 after end of the game by the score of 0–0, Libya win their first international title.

== Match ==
1 February 2014
20:00

Libya	0–0 (a.e.t.)	Ghana
	Report
Penalties
Al Badri (penalty scored); Al Mahdi (penalty scored); Al Maghasi (penalty scored); Al-Gadi (penalty missed); Omar (penalty missed); El Trbi (penalty scored)	4–3	(penalty missed) Akuffu; (penalty missed) Ainooson; (penalty scored) Attobrah; (penalty scored) Saka; (penalty scored) Owusu; (penalty missed) Joshua

Cape Town Stadium, Cape Town
Attendance: 16,505
Referee: (Algeria) Mohamed Benouza

Libya	Ghana

=== Lineups ===
GK	1	Muhammad Nashnoush
DF	2	Ahmed Al Maghasi
DF	3	El Mehdi El Houni
MF	4	Ahmed Al Alwani	(yellow card) ...'
FW	8	Mohamed Al-Gadi
FW	9	Mohamed Al Ghanodi		(substituted off) 64'
DF	14	Ali Salama (c)
DF	15	Ahmed Al Trbi
MF	16	Ali Musrati
MF	18	Faisal Al Badri	(yellow card) ...'
FW	19	El Mutasem Abushnaf		(substituted off) 106'
Substitutes:
GK	12	Ali Eshnayna
FW	7	Moataz Al-Mehdi		(substituted on) 106'
FW	21	Abdelsalam Elfaitory		(substituted on) 64'
Manager:
(Spain) Javier Clemente

GK	22	Steven Adams
DF	2	Godfred Saka
DF	5	Abeiku Ainooson
MF	6	Michael Akuffu
MF	8	Jordan Opoku (c)	(substituted off) 119'
FW	9	Seidu Bancey
MF	10	Asiedu Attobrah
MF	11	Theophilus Annorbaah	(substituted off) 99'
FW	13	Sulley Mohammed	(substituted off) 62'
DF	14	Tijani Joshua
DF	15	Nuru Sulley
Substitutes:
GK	1	Isaac Amoako
MF	21	Yahaya Mohamed	(substituted on) 62'
MF	17	Latif Mohammed	(substituted on) 99'
MF	4	Jackson Owusu	(substituted on) 119'
Manager:
(Ghana) Maxwell Konadu

Man of the Match:
(Libya) Muhammad Nashnoush

Assistant referees:
(Mauritius) Balkrishna Bootun
(Cameroon) Yanoussa Moussa
Fourth official:
(Guinea) Aboubacar Mario Bangoura

Match rules:

- 90 minutes
- 30 minutes of extra time if scores level
- Penalty shoot-out if scores still level
- Of 12 substitutes named, 3 may be used
