= 2019 WAFU Cup of Nations =

Tournament details
- Host country: Senegal
- Dates: 28 September – 13 October 2019
- Teams: 16 (from 1 sub-confederation)
- Venue: 1 (in 1 host city)

Final positions
- Champions: Senegal (1st title)
- Runners-up: Ghana

Tournament statistics
- Matches played: 22
- Goals scored: 42 (1.91 per match)
- Top scorer: (Ghana) Shafiu Mumuni (4 goals)

The 2019 WAFU Cup of Nations was the sixth edition of the WAFU Nations Cup, an association football tournament that is affiliated with the West African Football Union (WAFU). It took place from 28 September to 13 October 2019 in Thiès, Senegal. The tournament was sponsored by most notably ESPN and Royal Air Morac.

All sixteen members of WAFU competed in the competition in a knockout-style format with the losers of the first round playing in a plate-competition.

Senegal won the tournament after beating defending champions Ghana in the final via a penalty shoot-out.

== Sponsorship ==
The competition was sponsored by ESPN with Royal Air Maroc being the exclusive airline sponsor. The tournament was telecast on all ESPN platforms.

== Draw ==
The draw took place on 29 May 2019 at Radisson Blu Sea Plaza Hotel in Dakar.

== Officials ==
Referees

- Hassan Corneh (Liberia)
- Dahane Beida (Mauritania)
- Bangaly Konate (Guinea)
- Salisu Basheer (Nigeria)
- (Cape Verde) Fabricio Duarte (Cape Verde)
- (The Gambia) Omar Sallah (Gambia)
- Adaari Abdul Latif (Ghana)
- Daouda Gueye (Senegal)
- Mohamed Ali Moussa (Niger)
- (Ms) Vincentia Amedome (Togo)
- Boubou Traoré (Mali)
- Bonifacio Julio da Silva (Guinea-Bissau)
- (Ivory Coast) Allou Franc Eric Miessan (Ivory Coast)
- (Burkina Faso) Boureima Sanogo (Burkina Faso)
- Louis Houngnandande (Benin)

Assistant Referees

- Sekou S. Kanneh Jr (Liberia)
- Mohamed Mahmoud Youssouf (Mauritania)
- Mamady Tere (Guinea)
- Peter Eigege Ogwu (Nigeria)
- (Ms) Mimisen Iyorhe (Nigeria)
- (The Gambia) Essawa Sowe (Gambia)
- Noha Bangoura (Senegal)
- Abdoul Aziz Yacouba (Niger)
- (Ms) Adia Cissé (Senegal)
- Komlan Domenyo Adiwotso (Togo)
- Baba Yomboliba (Mali)
- (Ivory Coast) Adou Hermann N'Goh (Ivory Coast)
- (Burkina Faso) Habib Judicael Sanou (Burkina Faso)
- Aymar Eric Ayimavo (Benin)

== Matches ==
The match winners qualified for the cup competition, with the losing teams qualifying for the plate competition.

28 September 2019
17:00

Senegal	3–1	Guinea-Bissau
Guèye 10'; Assane 30'; Ba 86'		Gomes 40'

Stade Lat-Dior, Thiès
Referee: Salisu Basheer (Nigeria)
28 September 2019
20:00

Burkina Faso	1–1	Mauritania
Pognongo 85' (pen.)		Denne 73'
Penalties
	4–3

Stade Lat-Dior, Thiès
Referee: Bangaly Konate (Guinea)
29 September 2019

Nigeria	1–2	Togo
Sikiru 32'		Adjahli 16'; Ndah 43' (o.g.)

Stade Lat-Dior, Thiès
Referee: Dahane Beida (Mauritania)
29 September 2019

Sierra Leone	1–0	Liberia
Kalokoh 40'

Stade Lat-Dior, Thiès
Referee: Adaari Abdul Latif (Ghana)
30 September 2019

Mali	3–1	Niger
Samaké 3' (pen.); Moussa Koné 63', 67'		Ibrahim 85'

Stade Lat-Dior, Thiès
Referee: Bonifacio Julio da Silva (Guinea-Bissau)
30 September 2019

Ivory Coast	4–1	Cape Verde
Magbi 7' (pen.), 53'; Doumbia 22', 90+3'		Rolha 60'

Stade Lat-Dior, Thiès
Referee: Omar Sallah (Gambia)
1 October 2019

Ghana	1–0	Gambia
Esso 66'

Stade Lat-Dior, Thiès
Referee: Mohamed Ali Moussa (Niger)
1 October 2019

Guinea	1–2	Benin
Sylla 88'		Houngbedji 27'; Bonou 90+5'

Stade Lat-Dior, Thiès
Referee: Allou Franc Eric Miessan (Ivory Coast)

== Plate competition ==
Quarter-finals
Guinea-Bissau	0
Guinea	2
Liberia	1
Niger	0
Mauritania	0 (2)
Gambia	0 (4)
Nigeria	1 (2)
Cape Verde	1 (3)

Semi-finals
Guinea	1
Liberia	0
Gambia	0
Cape Verde	1

Final
Guinea	0 (4)
Cape Verde	0 (3)

=== Quarter-finals ===
3 October 2019

Guinea-Bissau	0–2	Guinea
		Camara 86'; Kantabadouno 88'

Stade Lat-Dior, Thiès
Referee: Hassan Corneh (Liberia)

4 October 2019

Mauritania	0–0	Gambia
Penalties
	2–4

Stade Lat-Dior, Thiès
Referee: Salisu Basheer (Nigeria)

5 October 2019

Nigeria	1–1	Cape Verde
Sikiru 65'		Cardoso 87'
Penalties
	2–3

Stade Lat-Dior, Thiès
Referee: (Ms) Vincentia Amedome (Togo)

6 October 2019

Liberia	1–0	Niger
Potis 25'

Stade Lat-Dior, Thiès
Referee: Daouda Gueye (Senegal)

=== Semi-finals ===
8 October 2019

Gambia	0–1	Cape Verde
		Norta 32'

Stade Lat-Dior, Thiès
Referee: Louis Houngnandande (Benin)

9 October 2019

Guinea	1–0	Liberia
Camara 39'

Stade Lat-Dior, Thiès
Referee: Mohamed Ali Moussa (Niger)

=== Final ===
12 October 2019
18:00

Guinea	0–0	Cape Verde
Penalties
	4–3

Stade Lat-Dior, Thiès
Referee: (Ms) Vincentia Amedome (Togo)

== Cup competition ==
Quarter-finals
Senegal	1
Benin	0
Sierra Leone	0
Mali	1
Burkina Faso	1 (4)
Ghana	1 (5)
Togo	0 (2)
Ivory Coast	0 (4)

Semi-finals
Senegal	2
Mali	0
Ghana	3
Ivory Coast	1

Final
Senegal	1 (3)
Ghana	1 (1)

=== Quarter-finals ===
3 October 2019

Senegal	1–0	Benin
Keny 64'

Stade Lat-Dior, Thiès
Referee: Boureima Sanogo (Burkina Faso)

4 October 2019

Burkina Faso	1–1	Ghana
Tiendrébéogo 3'		Shafiu 38'
Penalties
	4–5

Stade Lat-Dior, Thiès
Referee: Dahane Beida (Mauritania)

5 October 2019

Togo	0–0	Ivory Coast
Penalties
	2–4

Stade Lat-Dior, Thiès
Referee: Bonifacio Julio da Silva (Guinea-Bissau)

6 October 2019

Sierra Leone	0–1	Mali
		Sylla 4'

Stade Lat-Dior, Thiès
Referee: Fabricio Duarte (Cape Verde)

=== Semi-finals ===
8 October 2019

Ghana	3–1	Ivory Coast
Shafiu 30', 46', 50'		Doumbia 78'

Stade Lat-Dior, Thiès
Referee: Boubou Traoré (Mali)

9 October 2019

Senegal	2–0	Mali
Dramé 51'; Kane 83' (pen.)

Stade Lat-Dior, Thiès
Referee: Boureima Sanogo (Burkina Faso)

=== Final ===
13 October 2019
18:00

Ghana	1–1 (a.e.t.)	Senegal
Esso 111'		Badji 118'
Penalties
	1–3

Stade Lat-Dior, Thiès
Referee: Omar Sallah (Gambia)

== Champion ==
2019 WAFU Cup of Nations

Senegal
First title

=== WAFU Team of the Tournament ===
Coach: (Ghana) Maxwell Konadu

Goalkeeper	Defenders	Midfielders	Forward
(Liberia) Alpha Jalloh	(Ghana) Fatawu Mohammed (Togo) Kangnivi Ama Tchoutchoui (Senegal) Moussa Ndiaye (Senegal) Moutarou Baldé	(Guinea) Jean Mohamed Mouste (Ivory Coast) Ibrahima Ouattara (Ghana) Joseph Esso (Mali) Mamaye Coulibaly (Senegal) Ousseynou Niang	(Ghana) Shafiu Mumuni

=== Individual awards ===
The following awards were given at the conclusion of the tournament.

Top scorer

- (Ghana) Shafiu Mumuni (4 goals)

Golden Glove

- (Liberia) Alpha Jalloh

Coach of the Tournament

- (Ghana) Maxwell Konadu
