= Alfred Nelson (footballer) =

Ghanaian footballer

Alfred Azumah Nelson
Personal information
- Full name: Alfred Azumah Nelson
- Date of birth: 18 August 1992 (age 34)
- Place of birth: Accra, Ghana
- Height: 1.84 m (6 ft 0 in)
- Position: Centre-back

Team information
- Current team: Bechem United F.C.
- Number: 12

Youth career
- 2010: Unistar Academy

Senior career*
Years	Team	Apps	(Gls)
2011–2012	Liberty Professionals	21	(2)
2012–2013	Stade Nyonnais	6	(1)
2013	Liberty Professionals	8	(0)
2014	Bechem United F.C.	26	(2)

International career
2013–	Ghana	1	(0)
Medal record
Football
Representing Ghana
Winner	WAFU Nations Cup	2013
Runner-up	African Nations Championship	2014
- * Club domestic league appearances and goals

Alfred Azumah Nelson (born 18 August 1992) is a Ghanaian professional footballer who currently plays as a centre-back for Ghana Premier League club Bechem United F.C. and a member of Team Ghana who won the 2013 WAFU Nations Cup.

== Club career ==
Alfred Nelson began his club career with Ghana Premier League club Liberty Professionals prior to joining Stade Nyonnais on 1 February 2012 in the 2011–12 Swiss Challenge League season and Nelson debuted for Stade Nyonnais in the 2011–12 Swiss Challenge League season on 8 March 2012 in a 2–2 draw against SR Delémont at the La Blancherie Stadium and on 30 June 2012 Nelson rejoined Liberty Professionals in the 2012–2013 Ghanaian Premier League and Nelson debuted for Liberty Professionals in the 2012–2013 Ghanaian Premier League season on 24 February 2013 in a 3–3 draw against Asante Kotoko at the Kumasi Sports Stadium.

== International career ==
In November 2013, coach Maxwell Konadu invited Nelson to be included in the Ghana national football team for the 2013 WAFU Nations Cup. Nelson helped the Ghana national football team to a first-place finish after Ghana beat Senegal national football team by three goals to one. Nelson was included in the Ghana national football team that finished runner-up at the 2014 African Nations Championship.

== Bechem United ==
Alfred signed for 2016 Ghana FA Cup winners, Bechem United F.C.in May 2016. He was included in the Bechem United F.C. squad that won the FA Cup at the Cape Coast Stadium in September 2016.

== Honours ==
- Ghanaian FA Cup Winner: 2016

=== National team ===
Ghana

- African Nations Championship 2011
- WAFU Nations Cup Winner: 2013
- African Nations Championship Runner-up: 2014

== National Team Records ==
Year	Competition/Vennue	Apps	Goals
2011	African Nations Championship	4	0
2013	Ghana U-23	3	0
2014	African Nations Championship	6	0
