= Richard Mpong =

Ghanaian footballer (born 1990)

Personal information
- Date of birth: 4 July 1990 (age 36)
- Place of birth: Tarkwa, Western Region, Ghana
- Height: 1.71 m (5 ft 7 in)
- Position: Winger

Team information
- Current team: Elmina Sharks
- Number: 26

Senior career*
Years	Team	Apps	(Gls)
2006–2008	All Blacks	?	(?)
2008–2012	Medeama	?	(?)
2012–2016	Asante Kotoko	?	(?)
2016–2017	Aduana Stars	?	(?)
2018–	Elmina Sharks	?	(?)

International career^{‡}
2007	Ghana U17	3	(0)
2011	Ghana U23	4	(0)
2012–	Ghana	6	(1)
Medal record
Football
Asante Kotoko
Winner	Ghana Premier League	2013
Runner-up	Ghanaian FA Cup	2013
Winner	Ghana Super Cup	2013
Winner	Ghana Premier League	2014
Winner	Ghanaian FA Cup	2014
Representing Ghana
Men's Football
Gold medal – first place	2011 Mozambique	Team competition
Winner	WAFU Nations Cup	2013
Runner-up	African Nations Championship	2014
- * Club domestic league appearances and goals ‡ National team caps and goals as of 23:40, 1 February 2014 (UTC)

Richard Mpong (born 4 July 1990 in Tarkwa) is a Ghanaian professional footballer who currently plays as a winger, for Elmina Sharks and the Ghana national football team.

== Club career ==
=== All Blacks FC ===
Mpong signed with Ghanaian club All Blacks FC in the 2006–2007 season. Mpong played for All Blacks until 2008.

=== Medeama SC ===
On 1 July 2008, Mpong joined Kessben FC. In January 2011, the club changed their name and were renamed Medeama SC.

=== Asante Kotoko ===
In July 2012, Mpong signed contract with Asante Kotoko.

== International career ==
=== Ghana national under-17 team ===
2007 U-17 World Cup

Mpong represented the Ghana national under-17 football team at the 2007 FIFA U-17 World Cup in Korea Republic.

=== Ghana national under-23 team ===
2011 All-Africa Games

Mpong was a member of the Ghana national under-23 football team that won Ghana's first All-Africa Games football gold medal in the Football at the 2011 All-Africa Games when they defeated South Africa national under-23 football team 4–2 on penalty shoot-out at the Estádio do Zimpeto in Maputo, Mozambique on 17 September 2011.

=== Ghana national team ===
Mpong received an International friendly match call-up by the Ghana national football team technical staff for the Ghana national football team vs. Chile national football team friendly match at the PPL Park in Chester, Pennsylvania, United States on 29 February 2012. Mpong came on in the 18th Minute as a substitute and scored against Chile after receiving a pass from Sulley Muntari.

In November 2013, coach Maxwell Konadu invited Mpong to be a part of the Ghana national football team for the 2013 WAFU Nations Cup. Mpong helped the Ghana national football team to a first-place finish after Ghana beat Senegal national football team by three goals to one. Mpong was included in the Ghana national football team that finished runner-up at the 2014 African Nations Championship.

Senior International goals

#	Date	Venue	Opponent	Score	Result	Competition
1	29 February 2012	PPL Park, Chester, Pennsylvania, U.S.	Chile	1-1	Draw	Friendly

== Honours ==
=== Club ===
Asante Kotoko

- Ghana Premier League Winner: 2012–13, 2013–14
- Ghanaian FA Cup: Runner-up 2012–13, Winner 2013–14
- Ghana Super Cup Winner: 2012–13

=== National team ===
Ghana

- WAFU Nations Cup Winner: 2013
- African Nations Championship Runner-up: 2014

Ghana U23

- All-Africa Games Gold medal: 2011
