= Kodjovi Dadzie =

Togolese footballer

Kodjo Dadzié
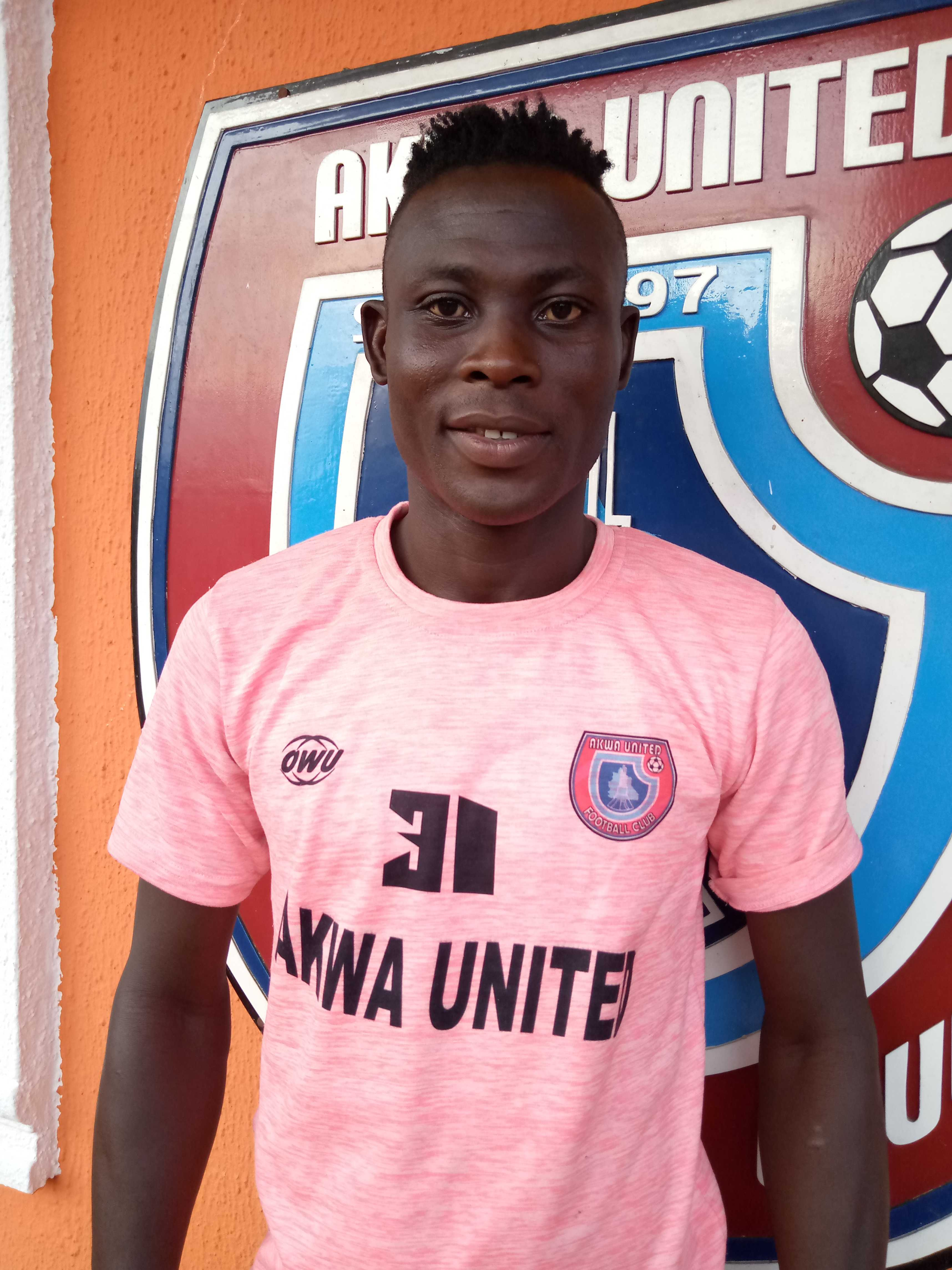

Personal information
- Full name: Kodjovi Dadzié
- Date of birth: 31 July 1989 (age 37)
- Place of birth: Lomé, Togo
- Height: 1.75 m (5 ft 9 in)
- Position: Left-back

Team information
- Current team: Akwa United
- Number: 31

Senior career*
| Years | Team | Apps | (Gls) |
| 2005–2015 | Gomido | | |
| 2016– | Akwa United | | |

International career^{‡}
| 2011–2015 | Togo | 4 | (0) |
- * Club domestic league appearances and goals as of 22 August 2020 ‡ National team caps and goals as of 13:24, 16 July 2019 (UTC)

Kodjovi Dadzié (born 31 July 1989) is a Togolese professional footballer who plays as a left-back for Akwa United and the Togo national team.

== Club career ==
Dadzié joined the Uyo-based Akwa United on 1 January 2016 and won the Nigeria domestic cup, Aiteo Cup, with the club in 2017. He played the entire duration of the final match, against Tornadoes at the Agege Stadium, Lagos on 15 October 2017 – which Akwa United won 3–2 on penalties after the full 90 minutes ended goalless. The left-back converted one of the spot kicks. He helped Akwa United to finish the 2016-17 NPFL season at fourth place in the 20-team log.

Dadzié played a key role in Akwa United's 2018 CAF Confederation Cup campaign, posting an outstanding performance in the first round, second leg tie against Hawks FC of Gambia on 21 February 2018. His cross led to the crucial second goal which sealed a 2-0 victory – and 3–2 aggregate win – over Hawks and a place in the second round.

== International career ==
On 7 October 2010, Dadzié, then 21, was shortlisted by Togo head coach Thierry Froger in his 23-man squad to face Tunisia in a 2012 Africa Cup of Nations qualifiers on 9 October 2010. Seven months later, Dadzié won the 2011 WAFU Nations Cup with the Tchakala Tchanilé-tutored Togo, with his side defeating hosts Nigeria 3–2 in the final at MKO Abiola Stadium, Abeokuta, on 14 May 2011. He played four games in the regional tournament.

Dadzié made the 18-man list of the Togo squad that defended the WAFU Cup title they won in 2011 at the Ghana 2013 WAFU Nations Cup, which held from 21 November 2013 to 28 November 2013. He finished the tournament with a bronze medal, after Togo beat Niger 3–1 in the third-place match at the Baba Yara Stadium on 26 November 2013.

Dadzie was part of the Togo team that failed to advance to the knockout stage at the ECOWAS 2013 UEMOA Tournament hosted by Cotedivoire between 27 October 2013 and 2 November 2013. He was called up to the senior national team in 2015 by Togo coach, Tom Saintfiet for the Russia 2018 FIFA World Cup qualifiers double header against Uganda in Lomé on 12 November 25 and Kampala on 15 November 2015, while he was still on the books on Gomido FC.

== Honours ==
=== Club ===
- Aiteo Cup
  - 2017 Aiteo Cup

(gold) Champion Akwa United (Nigeria)

- WAFU Nations Cup
  - 2011 WAFU Nations Cup

(gold) Champion Togo
