= Foli Adade =

Ghanaian footballer

Foli Adadey
Personal information
- Full name: Foli Adadey
- Date of birth: 10 September 1991 (age 35)
- Place of birth: Accra, Greater Accra, Ghana
- Height: 1.76 m (5 ft 9 in)
- Position: Goalkeeper

Team information
- Current team: Medeama
- Number: 16

Senior career*
Years	Team	Apps	(Gls)
2009–2010	Tema Youth	36	(0)
2010–2013	Ebusua Dwarfs	58	(0)
2013–	Medeama	15	(0)

International career
2011	Ghana U20	5	(0)
Medal record
Football
Medeama SC
Winner	Ghanaian FA Cup	2013
Representing Ghana
Winner	WAFU Nations Cup	2013
Runner-up	African Nations Championship	2014
- * Club domestic league appearances and goals

Foli Adadey (born 10 September 1991) is a Ghanaian professional footballer who plays as a goalkeeper for Medeama and the Ghana national football team.

== Club career ==
Adade played for Tema based football club, Tema Youth. In 2010, Adade joined Ebusua Dwarfs where Adade had been the first choice goalkeeper for the team, and in 2013, Adade joined Medeama in the Ghana Premier League.

== International career ==
In June 2013, Adade was included in the Ghana twenty-six man team for two international friendly matches against Ivory Coast. In November 2013, coach Maxwell Konadu invited Adade to be included in the Ghana national team for the 2013 WAFU Nations Cup. Adade helped the Ghana national football team defeat Senegal, placing first by three goals to one. Adade was part of the Ghana national football team for the 2014 African Nations Championship that finished runner-up.

== Honours ==
=== Club ===
Medeama SC

- Ghanaian FA Cup Winner: 2013

=== National team ===
Ghana

- WAFU Nations Cup Winner: 2013
- African Nations Championship Runner-up: 2014
- 2014 FIFA World Cup qualification Brazil
