= Joshua Tijani =

Ghanaian footballer (1992–2026)

Personal information
- Date of birth: 21 April 1992
- Place of birth: Ghana
- Date of death: November 2026 (aged 34)
- Height: 1.87 m (6 ft 2 in)
- Position: Left-back

Senior career*
Years	Team	Apps	(Gls)
2009–2010	Hasaacas		
2010–2013	Wa All Stars		
2013–2019	Ashanti Gold		
2020–2026	Aduana Stars		

International career
2013–2015	Ghana	9	(0)
Medal record
Football
Representing Ghana
Winner	WAFU Nations Cup	2013
Runner-up	African Nations Championship	2014
- * Club domestic league appearances and goals

Joshua Tijani (21 April 1992 – November 2026) was a Ghanaian professional footballer who played as a left-back.

== Club career ==
Tijani began his youth and senior career with Ghana Premier League club Wa All Stars debuting in the 2012–13 Ghanaian Premier League season prior to joining Ashanti Gold on 1 July 2013 for the beginning of the 2013–14 Ghanaian Premier League season.

== International career ==
In November 2013, coach Maxwell Konadu invited Tijani to be included in the Ghana national team for the 2013 WAFU Nations Cup. Tijani helped Ghana to a first-place finish after Ghana beat Senegal national football team by three goals to one. He was part of the Ghana team for the 2014 African Nations Championship that finished runner-up.

== Death ==
Tijani's death was announced on 14 November 2026. He was 34.

== Honours ==
Ghana

- WAFU Nations Cup: 2013
- African Nations Championship runner-up: 2014
