= Nuru Sulley =

Ghanaian footballer (born 1992)

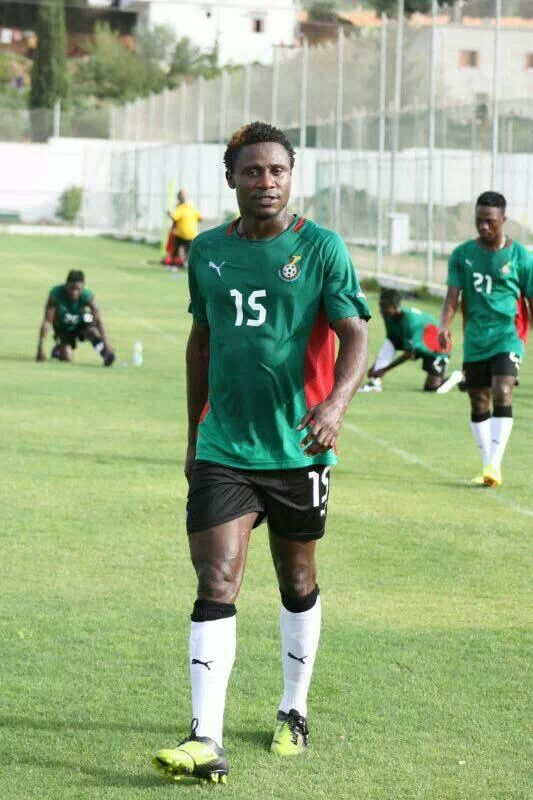
- Sulley in training with Ghana in 2014

Personal information
- Date of birth: 11 June 1992 (age 34)
- Place of birth: Accra, Greater Accra, Ghana
- Height: 1.85 m (6 ft 1 in)
- Position: Centre-back

Team information
- Current team: Duhok SC
- Number: 15

Youth career
- Great Olympics
- Tudu Mighty Jets
- Fadama

Senior career*
Years	Team	Apps	(Gls)
2008–2010	Great Olympics	45	(2)
2010–2011	Tudu Mighty Jets	32	(2)
2011–2014	Hearts of Oak	20	(3)
2014	Al-Nasr Benghazi		
2014	→ Tala'ea El Gaish (loan)		
2014–2015	Al-Ittihad		
2015–2017	Alanyaspor	32	(0)
2019	Al-Mina'a	15	(0)
2019–2020	Naft Al-Basra		
2020–2021	Hearts of Oak		
2022–	Duhok		

International career
2014	Ghana	6	(0)
Medal record
Football
Representing Ghana
Winner	WAFU Nations Cup	2013
Runner-up	African Nations Championship	2014
- * Club domestic league appearances and goals as of 22 July 2019

Nuru Sulley (born 11 June 1992) is a Ghanaian professional footballer who plays for Duhok in the Iraqi Premier League as a centre-back or defensive midfielder.

== Career ==
Nuru Sulley has played for Great Olympics where Sulley scored 3 goals, then Tudu Mighty Jets where Sulley had scored 2 goals and is currently playing with Accra Hearts of Oak SC as a centre back and defensive midfielder where Sulley has scored 2 goals in his first season with Accra Hearts of Oak. Sulley has a contract with Accra Hearts of Oak running until 2014–15 season in Ghana. Sulley has played for Ghana national football team in 2 matches in the 2013 WAFU Nations Cup in Ghana 2013. Currently, Sulley has played 6 matches for Ghana national football team in the 2014 African Nations Championship in South Africa leading the lines for the Ghana national football team and well disciplined to the semi-finals against Nigeria national football team on Wednesday 29 January 2014, and in the finals against Libya national football team on Saturday 1 February 2014.

In April 2020, Sulley returned to his homeland and joined Hearts of Oak. In September 2021, Iraqi club Erbil announced the signing of Sulley. Despite announcing the signing of Sulley, Hearts claimed Sulley was still their player and hadn't transferred him to any club whatsoever. Sulley, however, stayed ad Hearts until 22 December 2021, where his contract with the Ghanese club was terminated.

In January 2022, Sulley returned to Iraq, when he signed with Duhok.

== International career ==
In November 2013, coach Maxwell Konadu invited Sulley to be included in the Ghana 30-man team for the 2013 WAFU Nations Cup. Sulley helped Ghana to defeat Senegal to a first-place finish, 3–1.

During the 2013 WAFU Nations Cup, Sulley was invited and has played 8 matches under Maxwell Konadu, the Ghana national team coach: Ghana vs Burkina Faso national football team Semi-Finals WAFU Nations Cup and Ghana vs Senegal national football team Finals WAFU Nations Cup; African Nations Championship tournament in South Africa, Ghana vs Congo national football team, Ghana vs Libya national football team, Ghana vs Ethiopia national football team, Ghana vs DR Congo national football team Quarter-Finals, Ghana vs Nigeria national football team Semi-Finals, and Ghana vs Libya national football team Finals.

== Honours ==
Hearts of Oak

- Ghana Premier League: 2020–21
- Ghanaian FA Cup: 2021

Ghana

- WAFU Nations Cup: 2013
- African Nations Championship runner-up: 2014
