= Kennedy Boateng (footballer, born 1989) =

Ghanaian professional footballer

Personal information
- Full name: Kenneth Asamoah Boateng
- Date of birth: 30 November 1989 (age 36)
- Place of birth: Sekondi-Takoradi, Western region, Ghana
- Height: 1.87 m (6 ft 2 in)
- Position: Forward

Youth career
- Nania
- Asante Kotoko
- FC Maamobi
- Real Sportive

Senior career*
Years	Team	Apps	(Gls)
2006–2008	Real Sportive		
2008–2010	Jagodina	20	(2)
2010	→ Young Africans (loan)		
2010–2012	Young Africans	13	(8)
2012–2013	Vaslui	0	(0)
2013–2016	Medeama		
2017	Real Nakonde	6	(0)

International career
2014	Ghana	2	(0)
Medal record
Football
Medeama SC
Winner	Ghanaian FA Cup	2013
Ghana
Winner	WAFU Nations Cup	2013
Runner-up	African Nations Championship	2014
- * Club domestic league appearances and goals

Kennedy Asamoah Boateng (born 30 November 1989) is a Ghanaian professional footballer. His name has also appeared as Asomon Kenet and Kenneth Asamoah.

== Club career ==
Asamoah played for several clubs in Ghana while young. In summer 2008 he moved abroad to play with Serbian SuperLiga club FK Jagodina. He stayed in Serbia for two seasons playing a total of 20 SuperLiga matches and scoring twice. In late summer 2010 he was loaned to Tanzanian Premier League club Young Africans FC. In 2011, he made the only and winning goal for Young Africans in the CECAFA 2011 Kagame Inter-Club Cup final against Simba S.C.

In 2012, he returned to Europe, this time to Romanian side FC Vaslui however failed to make it to the first team, ad after a year has signed with Ghanaian top-flight side Medeama SC.

Kennedy Boateng has played for several Ghanaian teams and from 2013 to 2016 he played for Medeama in the Ghana Premier League.

== International career ==
In November 2013, coach Maxwell Konadu invited him to be a part of the Ghana squad for the 2013 WAFU Nations Cup. He helped the team to a first-place finish after Ghana beat Senegal by three goals to one.

== Honours ==
Young Africans

- Tanzanian Premier League: 2010–11
- Kagame Inter-Club Cup: 2011

Medeama SC

- Ghanaian FA Cup: 2015
- Ghana Super Cup: 2015

Ghana

- WAFU Nations Cup: 2013
- African Nations Championship Runner-up: 2014
