= Abeiku Ainooson =

Ghanaian professional footballer (born 1992)

Personal information
- Full name: Samuel Abeiku Ainooson
- Date of birth: 24 September 1992 (age 34)
- Place of birth: Ghana
- Height: 1.85 m (6 ft 1 in)
- Position: Centre back

Team information
- Current team: Hasaacas

Senior career*
| Years | Team | Apps | (Gls) |
| 2012–2013 | New Edubiase United | 21 | (0) |
| 2013–2017 | Asante Kotoko | 48 | (5) |
| 2015–2016 | → Al-Hilal EC (loan) | | |
| 2017 | → AshantiGold (loan) | | |
| 2018–2019 | Al-Fahaheel | | |
| 2020– | Hasaacas | | |

International career
| 2013– | Ghana | 13 | (0) |
Medal record
Football
Asante Kotoko
| Winner | Ghana Premier League | 2014 |
| Winner | Ghanaian FA Cup | 2014 |
Representing Ghana
| Winner | WAFU Nations Cup | 2013 |
| Runner-up | African Nations Championship | 2014 |
- * Club domestic league appearances and goals

Abeiku Ainooson (born 24 September 1992) is a Ghanaian professional footballer, who plays as a centre back for Sekondi Hasaacas FC.

== Club career ==
Ainooson began his professional senior club career with New Edubiase United debuting in the 2012–2013 Ghanaian Premier League season and on 1 July 2013, prior to the beginning of the 2013–2014 Ghanaian Premier League season Ainooson signed for Asante Kotoko.

== International career ==
In November 2013, coach Maxwell Konadu invited Ainooson to be a part of the Ghana squad for the 2013 WAFU Nations Cup. Ainooson helped the Ghana national football team to a first-place finish after Ghana beat Senegal by three goals to one. In 2014, Ainooson was included in the Ghana 23-man team for the 2014 African Nations Championship that won silver.

== Honours ==
=== Club ===
Asante Kotoko

- Ghana Premier League Winner: 2013–14
- Ghanaian FA Cup Winner: 2013–14

=== National team ===
Ghana

- WAFU Nations Cup Winner: 2013
- African Nations Championship Runner-up: 2014
