= Fatawu Mohammed =

Ghanaian professional footballer

Abdul Fatawu Mohammed
Personal information
- Date of birth: 6 June 1992 (age 34)
- Place of birth: Kumasi, Ghana
- Position: Defender

Team information
- Current team: Hearts of Oak
- Number: 2

Youth career
- Red Bull Ghana

Senior career*
Years	Team	Apps	(Gls)
2013	Real Tamale United	2	(0)
2013–2022	Hearts of Oak	126	(5)
2023–	Karela United	9	(1)

International career
2017–	Ghana A'		
2022–	Ghana	1	(0)
- * Club domestic league appearances and goals as of 17 August 2021

Abdul Fatawu Mohammed (born 6 June 1992) is a Ghanaian professional footballer who plays as a right-back and captains Ghanaian Premier league side Accra Hearts of Oak.

== Club career ==
He started his career with Red Bull Academy now West African Football Academy (WAFA). In 2012–13 season, he made his professional debut in the Ghana Premier League whilst playing for Real Tamale United.

After a move from Red Bull Academy Ghana to FC Red Bull Salzburg broke down, he was offered a trial by Hearts of Oak coach David Duncan and his assistant Ben Agyei. He impressed during the trial and was offered a deal with the Accra Hearts of Oak's juvenile side, Auroras FC. Mohammed moved to team in after featuring for Real Tamale United. In 2018, he was appointed as the captain after the departure of Inusah Musah.

== International career ==
In 2017, Mohammed earned a call up to the Ghana A' national football team, the Local Black Stars for a friendly match against Benin in May 2017. He played the full match as the match ended in a 1–1 draw. He was a key member of the team that placed second in the 2019 WAFU Cup of Nations, losing to Senegal in final via a penalty shootout. In November 2019, he earned a call up into the main team ahead of 2021 Africa Cup of Nations (AFCON) qualifiers against South Africa and São Tomé and Príncipe to serve as a replacement for Harrison Afful who was injured.

== Honours ==
Hearts of Oak

- Ghana Premier League: 2020–21
- Ghanaian FA Cup: 2021, 2021–22
- Ghana Super Cup: 2021
- President's Cup: 2022

Ghana

- WAFU Cup of Nations runner-up: 2019

Individual

- WAFU Nations Cup Team of the Tournament: 2019
