= Godfred Saka =

Ghanaian footballer (born 1988)

Personal information
- Full name: Godfred Saka
- Date of birth: 9 October 1988 (age 38)
- Place of birth: Ghana
- Height: 1.73 m (5 ft 8 in)
- Position: Right-back

Youth career
- –2009: Right to Dream Academy

Senior career*
Years	Team	Apps	(Gls)
2009–2017	Aduana Stars	100+	(21)
2018	Karela United	3	(0)
2019–2020	Accra Great Olympics	4	(0)

International career
2013–2015	Ghana	8	(0)
Medal record
Football
Representing Ghana
Winner	WAFU Nations Cup	2013
Runner-up	African Nations Championship	2014
- * Club domestic league appearances and goals

Godfred Saka (born October 9, 1988) is a Ghanaian professional footballer who is best known for playing as a right-back for Aduana Stars and the Ghana national football team. He went on to play for Karela United and Accra Great Olympics. He served as captain for Aduana Stars and Karela United. Saka played for Aduana Stars for 8 years and was included in the team for the Ghana Premier League that was won in the 2009–10 season and the 2017 season. At the international level, he represented Ghana for four major tournaments, playing and winning the WAFU Nations Cup in 2013, at two African Nations Championship tournament in 2014 and 2016 and the COSAFA Cup in 2015.

== Club career ==
=== Early career ===
Saka started his youth career for Right to Dream Academy, he had some training sessions with Everton in England during his formative years as part of the Right to Dream Academy programme.

=== Aduana Stars ===
Saka joined Ghana Premier League club Aduana Stars in July 2009. Saka debuted for Aduana Stars in the 2009–10 Ghana Premier League season. He played an instrumental role in helping them win the Ghana Premier League title for the first time in the club's history and setting the record as the first team to win in their debut season. He went on play for the club for 8 years serving as captain in the latter part of his time at the club. As captain, he led them to another Premier League title in the 2017 Ghanaian Premier League season.

=== Karela United ===
In January 2018, Saka joined newly promoted side Karela United on a one-year deal after exiting Aduana as a free agent. Prior to joining Karela United, in December 2017, Saka went on trials at Nigerian club Enyimba and was on the verge of securing a permanent transfer to the club however the deal collapsed. He came out publicly and criticized the club for not being "serious about the deal" after they demanded he stayed at the club for two weeks in order to check his fitness level. Ahead of the season, he was appointed as the captain of the side ahead of their inaugural premier league season. He made his debut for Karela 17 March 2018, in a 1–0 loss to Medeama SC. Even though the season was cancelled amid the GFA scandal, he only made 3 league appearances as his season was cut short due to injuries. He later parted ways with the club in January 2019.

=== Great Olympics ===
In November 2019, Saka signed for fellow Ghana Premier League club Accra Great Olympics as a free agent ahead of the 2019–20 season. He made his debut during the first match of the season against Ashanti Gold. The match ended in a 3–0 loss to Olympics. He went on and made 4 league appearances before the league was cancelled due to the COVID-19 pandemic in Ghana. In June 2020, he terminated his contract with club.

== International career ==
In November 2013, coach Maxwell Konadu invited Saka to be included in the Ghana 30-man team for the 2013 WAFU Nations Cup. Saka helped the Ghana national football team to a first-place finish after Ghana beat Senegal, 3–1. Saka was included in the Ghana national football team for the 2014 African Nations Championship that finished runner-up.

== Honours ==
Aduana Stars

- Ghana Premier League: 2009–10, 2017

Ghana

- WAFU Nations Cup Winner: 2013
- African Nations Championship Runner-up: 2014

Individual

- Ghana Premier League Most Promising Player: 2009
