= Kennedy Boateng =

Kennedy Boateng may refer to:

- Kennedy Boateng (footballer, born 1989), Ghanaian football player
- Kennedy Boateng (footballer, born 1996), Togolese football player
