= Theophilus Annorbaah =

Ghanaian footballer (born 1989)

Personal information
- Full name: Theophilus Annorbaah
- Date of birth: 17 September 1989 (age 37)
- Place of birth: Tema, Greater Accra, Ghana
- Height: 1.88 m (6 ft 2 in)
- Positions: Attacking midfielder; forward

Team information
- Current team: Medeama SC
- Number: 2

Youth career
- G.I.H.O.C. Stars

Senior career*
Years	Team	Apps	(Gls)
2006–2011	Ashanti Gold SC		
2011–	Medeama SC		

International career
2014–	Ghana	5	(1)
Medal record
Football
Medeama SC
Winner	Ghanaian FA Cup	2013
Representing Ghana
Winner	WAFU Nations Cup	2013
Runner-up	African Nations Championship	2014
- * Club domestic league appearances and goals

Theophilus Annorbaah (born 17 September 1989) is a Ghanaian professional footballer who currently plays for Medeama SC and the Ghana national football team.

== Club career ==
Theophilus Annorbaah played for Ghana Premier League club Ashanti Gold SC, prior to signing for Ghana Premier League club and Tarkwa based Medeama SC in May 2011. On 14 July 2013, Annorbaah won his first title with his club Medeama, after a 1–0 win over Asante Kotoko in the final of the Ghanaian FA Cup.

== International career ==
In November 2013, coach Maxwell Konadu invited Annorbaah to be included in the Ghana national football team for the 2013 WAFU Nations Cup. He helped the Ghana national football team to a first-place finish after the Ghana national football team beat Senegal national football team by three goals to one. Annorbaah was included in the Ghana national football team for the 2014 African Nations Championship that finished runner-up.

=== International goal ===
Scores and results list Ghana national football team's goal tally first.

#	Date	Venue	Opponent	Score	Result	Competition
1.	13 January 2014	Free State Stadium, Mangaung, South Africa	Congo	1–0	1–0	2014 African Nations Championship

== Honours ==
=== Club ===
Medeama SC

- Ghanaian FA Cup Winner: 2013

=== National team ===
Ghana

- WAFU Nations Cup Winner: 2013
- African Nations Championship Runner-up: 2014
