= Shafiu =

Shafiu is a masculine given name. Notable people with the name include:

- Shafiu Ahmed (born 1987), Maldivian footballer
- Shafiu Mumuni (born 1995), Ghanaian footballer
- Abdullah Shafiu Ibrahim Maldivian actor and singer
