= Asiedu Attobrah =

Ghanaian professional footballer

Personal information
- Date of birth: 15 March 1995 (age 31)
- Place of birth: Ghana
- Position: Midfielder

Team information
- Current team: Al-Shorta

Youth career
- 2008–2009: New Edubiase United

Senior career*
Years	Team	Apps	(Gls)
2009–2015	New Edubiase United		
2015–2016	K.V. Kortrijk		
2016–2017	Ashanti Gold		
2018–	Al-Shorta		
- * Club domestic league appearances and goals

Asiedu Attobrah is a Ghanaian professional footballer who currently plays for Al-Shorta in the Iraqi Premier League.

== Career ==
Asiedu Attobrah has played for several Ghanaian teams as well as Kortrijk in the Belgian Pro League as a midfielder.Asiedu plays in a more advanced role at times blurring the boundaries between midfielders and forwards.

== International career ==
In November 2013, coach Maxwell Konadu invited him to be a part of the Ghana senior squad for the 2013 WAFU Nations Cup He helped the team to a first-place finish after Ghana beat Senegal by three goals to one. As February 1, 2015, he has been invited to join the Ghanaian U-20 team for the African Youth Championship.
