= Jordan Opoku =

Ghanaian footballer (born 1983)

Personal information
- Full name: Jordan Darko-Opoku
- Date of birth: 8 October 1983 (age 43)
- Place of birth: Mampona Twifu, Ghana
- Height: 1.74 m (5 ft 9 in)
- Positions: Attacking midfielder; forward

Team information
- Current team: Berekum Chelsea
- Number: 32

Youth career
- Winneba Secondary School
- Tema Hurricanes
- Feyenoord Ghana
- Feyenoord

Senior career*
| Years | Team | Apps | (Gls) |
| 2002 | Feyenoord Ghana | – | (–) |
| 2002–2005 | Feyenoord | 0 | (0) |
| 2003–2004 | → Excelsior (loan) | 34 | (3) |
| 2004–2005 | → Royal Antwerp (loan) | 24 | (3) |
| 2005–2006 | Feyenoord Academy | 29 | (1) |
| 2006–2011 | Asante Kotoko | 113 | (22) |
| 2011 | → Dinamo Tirana (loan) | 16 | (2) |
| 2012–2013 | Berekum Chelsea | 25 | (2) |
| 2013–2015 | Asante Kotoko | 34 | (3) |
| 2015–2016 | Al-Talaba SC | – | (–) |
| 2017 | Sakaeo | 13 | (4) |
| 2018–2019 | Asante Kotoko | 24 | (1) |
| 2020– | Berekum Chelsea | 13 | (0) |

International career
| 2009– | Ghana | 8 | (0) |
Medal record
Football
Asante Kotoko
| Winner | Ghana Premier League | 2008 |
| Winner | Ghana Premier League | 2013 |
| Winner | Ghana Super Cup | 2013 |
| Winner | Ghana Premier League | 2014 |
| Winner | Ghanaian FA Cup | 2014 |
Representing Ghana
| Winner | WAFU Nations Cup | 2013 |
| Runner-up | African Nations Championship | 2014 |
- * Club domestic league appearances and goals

Jordan Darko-Opoku (born 8 October 1983) is a Ghanaian professional footballer, who currently plays as an attacking midfielder or forward for Berekum Chelsea and the Ghana national football team.

== Early life ==
Opoku was born on 8 October 1987 at Mampona Twifu in Ghana. He attended Winneba Secondary School for his secondary education whilst playing in the school's football team.

== Club career ==
Opoku is a product of Feyenoord Fetteh. Prior to that he played for the colts team, Tema Hurricans in Tema, Accra, bef0000ore being scouted in 2000 to join the Feyenoord Fetteh side. In 2003, he was adjudged as the SWAG Discovery of the Year for 2002.

Opoku gained promotion to play for the youth team of Fetteh's mother club Feyenoord, becoming the first player from the academy in Ghana to join the main club in Holland. Opoku spent some time at Dutch club Excelsior and Belgian club Royal Antwerp FC before returning to the Ghana. Opoku signed with Feyenoord Ghana for one year and joined in 2006 Asante Kotoko. In the 2007–2008 season Opoku won the Ghana Premier League title and the Ghana President's Cup with Asante Kotoko.

The attacking midfielder and forward on 31 January 2010 left his club Asante Kotoko. He served as the club captain from 2010 till 2011 when he moved to Dinamo Tirana on a four-month loan deal with Dinamo Tirana. After a short loan spell with Dinamo Tirana, Opoku became a free agent. In late January 2012, Opoku signed with Ghana Premier League club Berekum Chelsea. On 1 August 2013, Opoku re-signed for Asante Kotoko. After playing for Thailand club Sakaeo F.C. for a year, he rejoined Asante Kotoko in December 2018 on a one-year deal. In January 2020, Opoku returned to Berekum Chelsea.

== International career ==
Opoku's first call up for the Ghana national football team was for a friendly match against Argentina national football team, and Opoku earned his debut in the match on 1 October 2009. In November 2013, coach Maxwell Konadu invited Opoku to be a part of the Ghana national football team for the 2013 WAFU Nations Cup. Opoku helped the Ghana national football team to a first-place finish after Ghana national football team beat Senegal national football team by three goals to one.

Opoku captained and was a key member in the Ghana national football team for the 2014 African Nations Championship finished runner-up.

== Honours ==
Asante Kotoko

- Ghana Premier League: 2007–08, 2013–14
- GFA Normalization Competition: 2019
- Ghanaian FA Cup: 2014
- Ghana Super Cup: 2013

Ghana

- WAFU Nations Cup: 2013
- African Nations Championship Runner-up: 2009, 2014

Individual

- SWAG Discovery of the Year: 2002
