= Adade =

Adade is a surname. Notable people with the surname include:

- Daniel Adade (born 1995), Ghanaian footballer
- Foli Adade (born 1991), Ghanaian footballer
- Nicholas Yaw Boafo Adade (1927–2013), Ghanaian judge
