= Michael Akuffu =

Ghanaian footballer (born 1987)

Personal information
- Full name: Michael Akuffu
- Date of birth: 18 December 1987 (age 38)
- Place of birth: Tamale, Ghana
- Height: 1.78 m (5 ft 10 in)
- Positions: Defensive midfielder; right back

Team information
- Current team: Mekelle Kenema

Youth career
- Feyenoord Academy

Senior career*
Years	Team	Apps	(Gls)
2006–2010	Feyenoord Academy		
2008	→ ASEC Mimosas (loan)	10	(3)
2009–2010	→ FC PoPa (loan)	32	(7)
2011–2017	Asante Kotoko	?	(?)
2015	→ Al-Ansar (loan)	11	(1)
2017–	Mekelle Kenema	?	(?)

International career
2003–2004	Ghana U20		
2006–2008	Ghana Olympic		
2013	Ghana	7	(0)
Medal record
Football
Asante Kotoko
Winner	Ghana Premier League	2012
Winner	Ghana Premier League	2013
Runner-up	Ghanaian FA Cup	2013
Winner	Ghana Super Cup	2013
Winner	Ghana Premier League	2014
Winner	Ghanaian FA Cup	2014
Representing Ghana
Winner	WAFU Nations Cup	2013
Runner-up	African Nations Championship	2014
- * Club domestic league appearances and goals

Michael Akuffu (born 18 December 1987) is a Ghanaian professional footballer, who currently plays as a defensive midfielder or right-back for Mekelle Kenema.

== Club career ==
Akuffu began his club career with Ghana Football Leagues club Feyenoord Ghana. Akuffu is a defensive midfielder and right-back who enjoyed regular berth on loan to ASEC Mimosas. After 1 year at ASEC Mimosas Akuffu rejoined Feyenoord Ghana, and in July 2009 Akuffu went on trial in Finnish club FC PoPa. After the trial Akuffu signed a loan agreement until the end of the Finnish season. In the first 2 matches of FC PoPa Akuffu he already made a good impression by scoring 2 goals in 2 matches. In December 2010, Akuffu joined Asante Kotoko.

== International career ==
In November 2013, coach Maxwell Konadu invited Akuffu to be included in the Ghana 30-man team for the 2013 WAFU Nations Cup that Akuffu helped Ghana defeat Senegal for a first-place finish, 3–1. Akuffu was included in the Ghana national football team for the 2014 African Nations Championship that finished runner-up.

== Honours ==
=== Club ===
Asante Kotoko

- Ghana Premier League Winner: 2011–12, 2012–13, 2013–14
- Ghanaian FA Cup: Runner-up 2012–13, Winner 2013–14
- Ghana Super Cup Winner: 2012–13

=== National team ===
Ghana

- WAFU Nations Cup Winner: 2013
- African Nations Championship Runner-up: 2014
