= 2010 UEMOA Tournament =

Tournament details
- Host country: Niger
- City: Niamey
- Dates: 7 November - 14 November
- Teams: 8 (from 1 confederation)
- Venue: 1 (in 1 host city)

Final positions
- Champions: Niger (1st title)
- Runners-up: Benin

Tournament statistics
- Matches played: 13
- Goals scored: 28 (2.15 per match)

The 2010 edition of the UEMOA Tournament was the fourth edition of the competition. It took place between 7 and 14 November 2010 in Niamey, Niger.

== Competing teams ==
- Benin
- Burkina Faso
- Ivory Coast
- Guinea-Bissau
- Mali
- Niger
- Senegal
- Togo

== Squads ==
=== Benin ===
Coach: (France) Jean-Marc Nobilo

No.	Pos.	Player	Date of birth (age)	Caps	Club
	GK	Ludovic Alla	18 May 1990 (aged 20)	2	(Benin) Mambas Noirs
	GK	Saturnin Allagbe	22 November 1993 (aged 16)	0	(Benin) ASPAC
	DF	Lazadi Fousséni	30 June 1993 (aged 17)	0	(Benin) ASPAC
		Yacinth-Akapovi			
	DF	Junior Salomon	8 April 1986 (aged 24)	1	(Benin) ASPAC
		Yaya Toure Fatao			
		Ibrahim Sankande			
		Issa Gomo			
		Gabriel Kabore			
		Assamy Ouedraogo			
		Ali Zoungrana			
		Idrissa Sako			
		Wasiyou Isnola			
		Asante Solomon			
		Ocansey Mandela			
		Abamah Plange			
		Adama Diomande			
11	FW	Adjai Moussa-Ajayi Musa	21		(Benin) Buffles FC

=== Burkina Faso ===
No.	Pos.	Player	Date of birth (age)	Caps	Club
		Saidou Sandaogo			
		Victor Nikiema			
		Clement Gnimassou			
		Barazeseidou Christian Foune			
		Daniel Loute			
		Gerard Adanhounmey			
		Cîdric Corea			
		William Dassagaté			(Benin) ASPAC
		Djamal Fassass			
		Abikoye Shakirou			
		Makarimiousmane			
		Anoumqu Ahlin Agbossou			
		Jacques Bessan			
		Isaac Ioute			
		Mohamed Aoudou			
		Arnaud Seka			

=== Côte d'Ivoire ===
No.	Pos.	Player	Date of birth (age)	Caps	Club
		Marcelin Koffi			
		Eric Georges Bile			
		Pascal Serge Wawa			
		Magloire Konan Kouame			
		Tiezan Ladji Kone			
		Serge Konana Kouadio			
		Adama Yoko Baka			
		Samba Diabate			
		Techi Daniel Yeboah			
		Bolou Kipre			
		N Kouassi Ngoran			
		Ali Badra Sangare			
		Marc Mahan Goua			
		Herdman Tchetche Kipre			
		Pierre Jean Kesse Magoua			
		Yecoura Ti Coulibaly			
		Aboubacar Diomande			
		Serge Guy Kouakou Brou			

=== Guinea-Bissau ===
No.	Pos.	Player	Date of birth (age)	Caps	Club
		Seidi Issuf			
		Vieira Martinho			
		Junior Biquel Joao			
		Bamba W Sibiti Mirobaldo			
		Djalo Dede Momede			
		Gomes Joao Emiliano			
		Co Herculano			
		Seidi Malam			
		Dabo Soares Tomas			
		Djassi Mamadi			
		Soares Agostinho			
		Pina De G Suleimane			
		Dole Braima			
		Ba Dauda			
		Badinga Jose Vladimir			
		Camara Dasilva Ismael			
		Indeque Rui Vladir			

=== Mali ===
No.	Pos.	Player	Date of birth (age)	Caps	Club
		Sogoba Almany			
		Traore Issa			
		Konate Amara			
		Camara Mohamed			
		Maiga Youssouf Abdoulaye			
		Mariko Mahamadou			
		Degoga Hamidou			
		Diop Moriba			
		Mariko Modibo			
		Diamoutene Amadou			
		Diallo Seydou			
		Diakite Soumala			
		Konate Omar Mahamed			
		Diarra Mady Fanta Tcheick			
		Coulibaly Kalifa			
		Dembele Youssouf			
		Diawara Lamine			

=== Niger ===
No.	Pos.	Player	Date of birth (age)	Caps	Club
		Pesse P Essohouna			
		Jimmy Bulus			
		Doudou Tahirou			
		O Bonkan Moussa			
		Louali Idrissa			
		Ousmane B Adoulaye			
		Mahamed Chiloto			
		Boubacar Talhtou			
		Ainsa Issoufou			
		Ibrhim Boubacar			
		Karim Oomarou			
		Doumbia Losseiny			
		Abdoulaye Hamadou Hamza			
		Yacouba Ali Seydou			
		Karim Abdou Moussa			
		Wyrou Moussa Abdoulaye			
		Kouassi G Parfait			
		Bousouasoul Abdoulaye			

=== Senegal ===
No.	Pos.	Player	Date of birth (age)	Caps	Club
		Issa Ndiaye			
		Mar Soumare			
		Babacar Ndiour			
		Ablaye Seck			
		Ferdinand Gomis			
		Moustapha Kasse			
		Issa Saar			
		Lamine Ly			
		Djibril Sidibé			
		Dieukani Khade Abdou Fall			
		Pape Diop			
		Ndiaye Khadim			
		Alpha Ba			
		Youssouf Ben Karamba Diallo			
		Stephane Badji			
		Stephane Badji			

=== Togo ===
No.	Pos.	Player	Date of birth (age)	Caps	Club
		Liyabe Kpatoumbi			
		Rachid Aboubacar			
		Ougadja Mani			
		Hassan Tchagnirou			
		Jules Degbe			
		Moitapari Samari			
		Elodi Kokou Hedjakpo			
		Moustapha Makouwa Ali			
		Faissal Essoazina			
		Smalai Tchadenou			
		Che Etsevi Besse			
		Sadate Essoazina			
		Jacques Koto			
		Duevi Kwelawi Tsibiakou			
		Emeasion Komi Houega			
		Khaled Yaya			
		Edem Kodjo Housrouvi			
		Maglibe Kouloun			

== Group stage ==
=== Group A ===
Pos	Team	Pld	W	D	L	GF	GA	GD	Pts	Qualification
1	Niger (H)	3	1	2	0	5	2	+3	5	Advance to Final
2	Burkina Faso	3	1	2	0	5	3	+2	5	
3	Togo	3	1	0	2	3	6	−3	3	
4	Guinea-Bissau	3	0	2	1	4	6	−2	2	

Rules for classification: Tiebreakers
(H) Hosts
7 November 2010

Niger	1 – 1	Guinea-Bissau

Stade Général Seyni Kountché, Niamey
7 November 2010

Burkina Faso	2 – 0	Togo

Stade Général Seyni Kountché, Niamey
9 November 2010

Guinea-Bissau	2 – 2	Burkina Faso

Stade Général Seyni Kountché, Niamey
9 November 2010

Niger	3 – 0	Togo

Stade Général Seyni Kountché, Niamey
11 November 2010

Togo	3 – 1	Guinea-Bissau

Stade Général Seyni Kountché, Niamey
11 November 2010

Niger	1 – 1	Burkina Faso

Stade Général Seyni Kountché, Niamey

=== Group B ===
Pos	Team	Pld	W	D	L	GF	GA	GD	Pts	Qualification
1	Benin	3	2	1	0	4	1	+3	7	Advance to Final
2	Ivory Coast	3	1	0	2	3	4	−1	3	
3	Senegal	3	1	1	1	2	2	0	4	
4	Mali	3	0	2	1	1	3	−2	2	

Rules for classification: Tiebreakers
8 November 2010

Senegal	0 – 1	Benin

Stade Général Seyni Kountché, Niamey
8 November 2010

Ivory Coast	2 – 0	Mali

Stade Général Seyni Kountché, Niamey
10 November 2010

Ivory Coast	1 – 3	Benin

Stade Général Seyni Kountché, Niamey
10 November 2010

Senegal	1 – 1	Mali

Stade Général Seyni Kountché, Niamey
12 November 2010

Mali	0 – 0	Benin

Stade Général Seyni Kountché, Niamey
12 November 2010

Senegal	1 – 0	Ivory Coast

Stade Général Seyni Kountché, Niamey

== Final ==
14 November 2010

Niger	1 – 0	Benin

Stade Général Seyni Kountché, Niamey
