= Jackson Owusu =

Ghanaian footballer

Personal information
- Full name: Jackson Owusu
- Date of birth: 7 March 1993 (age 33)
- Height: 1.77 m (5 ft 9 1/2 in)
- Position: Midfielder

Senior career*
Years	Team	Apps	(Gls)
2014–2015	Berekum Chelsea	1	(1)
2015–2019	Asante Kotoko	24	(2)
2018–2019	→ Al-Tadamon (loan)		
2019–2021	Gor Mahia		
2021–2022	Berekum Chelsea	26	(0)

International career
2014	Ghana	3	(0)
- * Club domestic league appearances and goals

Jackson Owusu is a Ghanaian professional footballer who currently plays for Gor Mahia in the Kenya Premier League.

== Playing career ==
Owusu has played for several Ghanaian teams and is currently playing with Gor Mahia as a midfielder.

== International career ==
In November 2013, coach Maxwell Konadu invited him to be a part of the Ghana squad for the 2013 WAFU Nations Cup. He helped the team to a first-place finish after Ghana beat Senegal by three goals to one.
