= Stéphane Badji =

Senegalese footballer

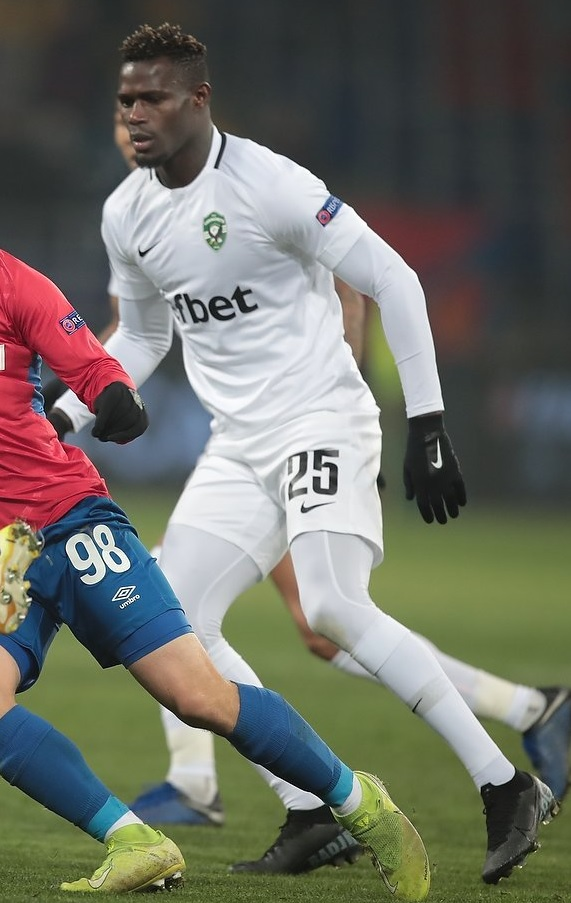
- Badji with Ludogorets Razgrad in 2019

Personal information
- Full name: Stéphane Diarra Badji
- Date of birth: 18 January 1990 (age 36)
- Place of birth: Ziguinchor, Senegal
- Height: 1.80 m (5 ft 11 in)
- Position: Midfielder

Team information
- Current team: Omonia Aradippou
- Number: 25

Youth career
- Ècole de football Mamadou Fayé

Senior career*
Years	Team	Apps	(Gls)
2008	ASC Xam-Xam		
2009–2011	Casa Sport		
2012–2013	Sogndal	24	(0)
2013–2015	SK Brann	49	(0)
2015–2016	İstanbul Başakşehir	30	(0)
2016–2018	Anderlecht	16	(0)
2017–2018	→ Kayserispor (loan)	31	(3)
2018–2019	Bursaspor	29	(0)
2019–2022	Ludogorets Razgrad	57	(0)
2022–2023	Eyüpspor	12	(0)
2023–2024	Olympiakos Nicosia	25	(0)
2024–	Omonia Aradippou	0	(0)

International career
2011–2012	Senegal U23	7	(0)
2012–	Senegal	21	(0)
- * Club domestic league appearances and goals as of 17:15, 17 July 2023 (UTC)

Stéphane Diarra Badji (born 18 January 1990) is a Senegalese professional footballer who played as a midfielder for Cypriot club Omonia Aradippou.

Badji moved from Senegal to Norway in 2012, signing with Sogndal. The following year, he joined SK Brann, where spent two seasons before moved to Turkish club İstanbul Başakşehir in 2014.

== Club career ==
Badji started his career alongside his brother Ismaïla Diarra Badji in the Ècole de football Mamadou Fayé. In the winter of 2007–2008 he left the football school of Mamadou Fayé with his brother and joined to Championnat Professionnel Ligue 1 side Xam-Xam.

After a successful first professional season the Badji brothers signed in Spring 2009 with Casa Sport. On 31 December 2011, left his club Casa Sport and signed with Tippeligaen club Sogndal Fotball, without his brother who plays today with Casa Sport.

On 1 March 2013, he signed a four-year contract with Brann.

On 28 June 2019, Badji signed a contract with Ludogorets Razgrad.

On 2 February 2022, Badji signed a contract with Eyüpspor.

On 17 July 2023, Badji signed a one-year contract with Olympiakos Nicosia and was named captain at the club.

== International career ==
Badji played for Senegal national under-23 football team the 2012 Summer Olympics in London. He earned his first senior cap in November 2011 and played in 2011 the UEMOA Tournament.

Badji received 21 team selections from Senegal between 2012 and 2015, without scoring a goal.

He played his first national team match on 29 February 2012, a friendly against South Africa. He then played five matches returning to the 2014 FIFA World Cup qualification.

== Career statistics ==
As of match played 21 March 2022

Appearances and goals by club, season and competition
Club	Season	League			Cup		Continental		Other		Total	
Club	Season	Division	Apps	Goals	Apps	Goals	Apps	Goals	Apps	Goals	Apps	Goals
Sogndal	2012	Tippeligaen	24	0	1	0	—		—		25	0
Brann	2013	Tippeligaen	28	0	0	0	—		—		28	0
Brann	2014	Tippeligaen	21	0	3	0	—		—		24	0
Brann	Total		49	0	3	0	—		—		52	0
İstanbul Başakşehir	2014–15	Süper Lig	15	0	2	0	—		—		17	0
İstanbul Başakşehir	2015–16	Süper Lig	15	0	5	0	2	0	—		22	0
İstanbul Başakşehir	Total		30	0	7	0	2	0	—		39	0
Anderlecht	2015–16	Belgian First Division A	6	0	0	0	4	0	8	0	18	0
Anderlecht	2016–17	Belgian First Division A	10	0	1	0	7	0	—		18	0
Anderlecht	Total		16	0	1	0	11	0	8	0	36	0
Kayserispor (loan)	2017–18	Süper Lig	31	3	4	0	—		—		35	3
Bursaspor	2018–19	Süper Lig	29	0	1	0	—		—		30	0
Ludogorets Razgrad	2019–20	Bulgarian First League	21	0	2	0	14	0	0	0	37	0
Ludogorets Razgrad	2020–21	Bulgarian First League	20	0	3	0	9	0	0	0	32	0
Ludogorets Razgrad	2021–22	Bulgarian First League	16	0	2	0	13	0	0	0	31	0
Ludogorets Razgrad	Total		57	0	7	0	36	0	0	0	100	0
Eyüpspor	2021–22	TFF First League	7	0	0	0	—		0	0	7	0
Career total			243	3	24	0	49	0	8	0	324	3

== Honours ==
Casa Sport

- Senegal FA Cup: 2011

Ludogorets

- First Professional Football League (Bulgaria): 2019–20, 2020–21
- Bulgarian Supercup: 2019

Senegal

- UEMOA Tournament: 2011
