= Sulley Mohammed =

Ghanaian footballer

Personal information
- Full name: Sulley Mohammed
- Date of birth: December 7, 1995 (age 30)
- Place of birth: Ghana
- Height: 1.79 m (5 ft 10 in)
- Position: Centre-forward

Team information
- Current team: Musanze FC

Senior career*
Years	Team	Apps	(Gls)
2016	Inter Allies	7	(0)
2024–	Inter Allies		
2023–	Musanze FC		

International career^{‡}
2014	Ghana	2	(1)
- * Club domestic league appearances and goals as of 2025-04-18 ‡ National team caps and goals as of 2025-04-18

Sulley Mohammed is a Ghanaian professional footballer who currently plays for King Faisal F.C. in the Ghana Premier League.

== Career ==
Sulley Mohammed has played for several Ghanaian teams and is currently playing with King Faisal F.C. as a forward.

== International career ==
In November 2013, coach Maxwell Konadu invited him to be a part of the Ghana squad for the 2013 WAFU Nations Cup. He helped the team to a first-place finish after Ghana beat Senegal by three goals to one.
