= 2016 UEMOA Tournament =

Tournament details
- Host country: Togo
- City: Lomé
- Dates: 26 November-3 December 2016
- Teams: 8 (from 1 confederation)
- Venue: 2 (in 1 host city)

Final positions
- Champions: Senegal (3rd title)
- Runners-up: Mali

Tournament statistics
- Matches played: 13
- Goals scored: 17 (1.31 per match)

The 2016 UEMOA Tournament was a football tournament, that took place from 26 November to 3 December 2016.

== Participants ==
- Benin
- Burkina Faso
- Ivory Coast
- Guinea-Bissau
- Mali
- Niger
- Senegal
- Togo

== Venues ==
Lomé
Stade de Kégué	Stade Municipal

== Group stage ==
=== Group A ===
Pos	Team	Pld	W	D	L	GF	GA	GD	Pts	Qualification
1	Mali	3	2	1	0	2	0	+2	7	Advance to Final
2	Niger	3	1	2	0	2	1	+1	5	
3	Ivory Coast	3	1	1	1	1	1	0	4	
4	Togo (H)	3	0	0	3	1	4	−3	0	

Rules for classification: Tiebreakers
(H) Hosts
26 November 2016
15:00

Togo	0–1	Mali
		Kone 57'

Stade de Kégué
Referee: Maguette N'Diaye (Senegal)
26 November 2016
17:30

Niger	0–0	Ivory Coast

Stade de Kégué
Referee: Raphiou Ligali (Benin)
28 November 2016
15:00

Mali	0–0	Niger

Stade de Kégué
Referee: Reinaldo Domingos Barbosa (Guinea-Bissau)
28 November 2016
17:30

Togo	0-1	Ivory Coast
		Cissé 92'

Stade de Kégué
Referee: Jean Ouattara (Burkina Faso)
30 November 2016
15:00

Ivory Coast	0-1	Mali
		Djenepo 26'

Stade de Kégué
Referee: Jean Ouattara (Burkina Faso)
30 November 2016
15:00

Niger	2-1	Togo
Mossai 28' Koye 65'		Kouloun 35'

Stade Municipal (Lomé)
Referee: Reinaldo Domingos Barbosa (Guinea-Bissau)

=== Group B ===
Pos	Team	Pld	W	D	L	GF	GA	GD	Pts	Qualification
1	Senegal	3	2	1	0	7	1	+6	7	Advance to Final
2	Burkina Faso	3	1	1	1	2	2	0	4	
3	Guinea-Bissau	3	1	0	2	1	6	−5	3	
4	Benin	3	0	2	1	0	1	−1	2	

Rules for classification: Tiebreakers
27 November 2016
15:00

Senegal	2–1	Burkina Faso
Badji 13'; Niane 89'		Karambiri 24'

Stade de Kégué
Referee: Yanissou Bebou (Togo)
27 November 2016
17:30

Guinea-Bissau	1–0	Benin
Toni Silva 73'

Stade de Kégué
Referee: Ousmane Karembe (Mali)

29 November 2016
15:00

Burkina Faso	1-0	Guinea-Bissau
Karambiri 13'

Stade de Kégué
Referee: Abdoulaye Rhissa Al-Moustapha (Niger)
29 November 2016
17:30

Benin	0-0	Senegal

Stade de Kégué
Referee: Allou Miessan (Ivory Coast)

1 December 2016
15:00

Burkina Faso	0-0	Benin

Stade de Kégué
Referee: Boubou Traoré (Mali)
1 December 2016
15:00

Senegal	5-0	Guinea-Bissau
Niane 16'; Diatta 24'; Badje 30', 80'; Habib 88'

Stade Municipal (Lomé)
Referee: Ousmane Karembe (Mali)

== Final ==
3 December 2016

Mali	0-1	Senegal
		Badje 78'

Stade de Kégué
Referee: Allou Miessan (Ivory Coast)
