= Ibrahim Tanko =

Ghanaian retired footballer (born 1977)

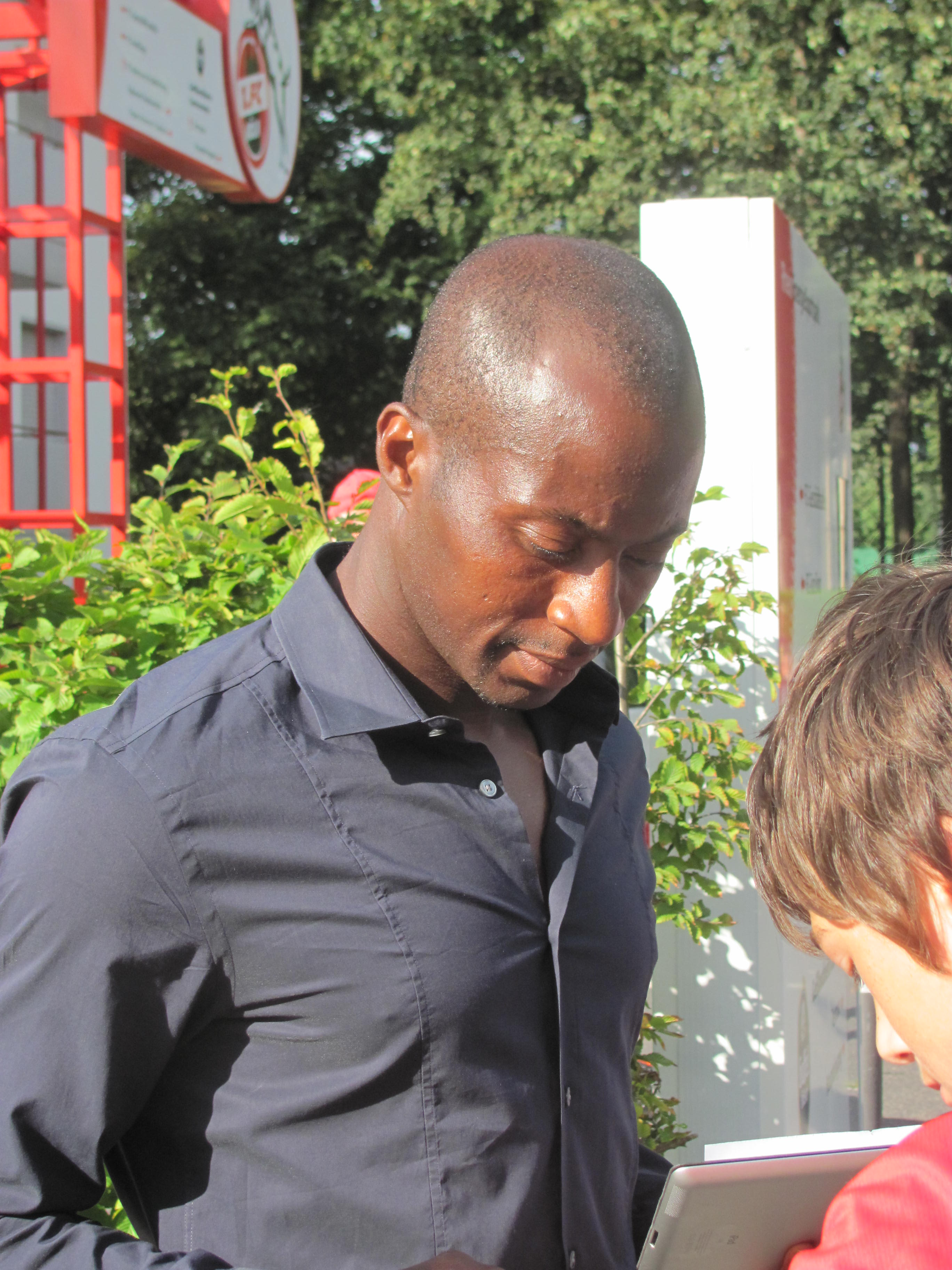
- Tanko in 2011

Personal information
- Full name: Ibrahim Anyars Tanko
- Date of birth: 25 July 1977 (age 49)
- Place of birth: Kumasi, Ghana
- Height: 1.80 m (5 ft 11 in)
- Position: Forward

Youth career
- King Faisal Babes

Senior career*
Years	Team	Apps	(Gls)
1993–1994	King Faisal Babes		
1994–2001	Borussia Dortmund	52	(3)
1998–2000	Borussia Dortmund II	24	(2)
2001–2007	SC Freiburg	106	(5)
Total		182	(10)

International career
1996–2004	Ghana	9	(0)

Managerial career
- 2019: Ghana U-23
- 2020–2021: Ghana A'
- * Club domestic league appearances and goals

Ibrahim Anyars Tanko (born 25 July 1977) is a Ghanaian retired footballer who played mostly as a second striker or an attacking midfielder, scout and manager who last served as the head coach of the local Black Stars - Ghana A' national football team.

He played most of his 15-year professional career – blighted by injuries – in Germany, with Borussia Dortmund and Freiburg. At the international level, he represented the Ghana national football team.

== Club career ==
=== Borussia Dortmund ===
Born in Kumasi, Tanko began his professional career in Germany at just 17, signing with German side Borussia Dortmund from King Faisal Babes F.C. This made him the third-youngest player ever to feature for the club, behind Nuri Şahin and Lars Ricken. He made his Bundesliga debut on 24 September 1994 in a 5–0 home win against VfB Stuttgart, and finished his first season with 14 games and one goal.

Tanko participated in three matches, all as a late substitute, in Borussia's 1996–97 UEFA Champions League victorious run. Injuries and loss of form led to an eventual demotion to Borussia Dortmund II, where he played 24 league matches from 1998 to 2000.

He made another 13 league appearances before leaving the club in 2001. He was also suspended and eventually released after testing positive for cannabis. During his seven-year period with the club, he made 71 appearances in all competitions for the first team and scored three goals.

=== SC Freiburg ===
In January 2001, Tanko joined SC Freiburg, scoring in his fourth game to help to a 3–1 success at VfL Bochum, but also missed a great part of the following campaign due to a severe knee injury, as the Black Forest team dropped down to the 2. Bundesliga.

At Freiburg, Tanko's output improved slightly, and he played a career-high 27 matches (with two goals) in 2005–06 2. Bundesliga. However, he only appeared once the following season, and retired at 30.

== International career ==
Tanko earned nine caps for Ghana, the last coming on 10 October 2004 – after an absence of eight years – in a 2006 FIFA World Cup qualifier against the Democratic Republic of Congo.

== Coaching career ==
On 1 July 2007, Tanko was named assistant coach for Freiburg's reserves, leaving after 18 months together with Karsten Neitzel to J1 League's Urawa Red Diamonds, and re-uniting with former Freiburg boss Volker Finke in the same capacity. In the 2011 summer, he began working under Ståle Solbakken at 1. FC Köln. On 4 June 2013, Tanko resumed his partnership with Finke as the former joined the latter's coaching staff in the Cameroon national side. In January 2012 he was appointed as the Ghana national team's head scout, prior to that year's Africa Cup of Nations.

In May 2017, Tanko was appointed as the first assistant coach for the Ghana national team to James Kwesi Appiah. After serving in that role two years, he was promoted to serve as the head coach of the Ghana national U-23, the Black Meteors in November 2018 after Yussif Abubakar died. He led the team to the Africa U-23 Cup of Nations tournament, Egypt 2019, for the first time in 12 years. The team missed out on qualifying for the 2020 Tokyo Olympics after losing on penalty shout out to South Africa. In January 2020, Tanko was appointed as the head coach of the Ghana A' national football team, the local Black Stars. After 5 months in charge of the team, he was replaced by Annor Walker.

On Tuesday, 28 June 2022, Tanko was appointed the Head coach of the Black Meteors by the Executive Council of the Ghana Football Association.

== Personal life ==
Tanko is married with three children. He is a devout Muslim and speaks French, English and German.

== Honours ==
Borussia Dortmund

- Bundesliga: 1994–95, 1995–96
- UEFA Champions League: 1996–97

== See also ==
- List of doping cases in sport
