= Solomon Okpako =

Nigerian footballer

Personal information
- Full name: Solomon Arrow-Men Okpako
- Date of birth: 1 May 1990 (age 36)
- Place of birth: Abraka, Nigeria
- Height: 1.70 m (5 ft 7 in)
- Position: Defensive midfielder

Team information
- Current team: Enugu Rangers
- Number: 32

Senior career*
Years	Team	Apps	(Gls)
2005	Bendel United	12	(2)
2006–2010	Kano Pillars	96	(15)
2010–2011	Panionios	3	(0)
2011–2012	Mamelodi Sundowns	5	(0)
2013–2014	Chippa United	10	(0)
2014–2015	Santos	22	(0)
2017	Enyimba International F.C.		
2018	Enugu Rangers		
- * Club domestic league appearances and goals as of 18 May 2016 ‡ National team caps and goals as of 18 May 2011

Solomon Okpako (born 1 May 1990) is a Nigerian footballer who currently plays for Nigeria Premier League side Enugu Rangers.

== Career ==
Okpako started his career 2003 on the youth side for Bendel United and was at age 15 promoted to the senior team. He left after one-season to sign for Nigeria Premier League club Kano Pillars F.C., in January 2006. He currently stars for seven time Nigeria champions Enyimba International F.C., since January 2017.

== International career ==
Okpako was called into camp for the Nigeria U-20 team prior to the 2009 FIFA World Youth Championship in Egypt but did not make coach Samson Siasia's final squad. He was called up for the camp prior to the 2010 FIFA World Cup in South Africa under Coach Lars Lagerback after helping the Eagles B team win the 2010 WAFU Cup.
