= Annor Walker =

Ghanaian football coach (died 2025)

Daniel Annor Walker (1962 or 1963 – 1 October 2025) was a Ghanaian football coach who coached the Accra Great Olympics and the Ghana A' national football team (Local Black Stars). He previously coached Ghanaian teams; Nania FC, Kpando Hearts of Lions and Berekum Chelsea.

== Coaching career ==
Walker was a CAF License A holder and has coached several clubs in Ghana including Nania FC, Tudu Mighty Jets, Kpando Hearts of Lions and Berekum Chelsea.

=== Nania FC ===
Walker served as the assistant coach and head coach of Nania FC from 2005 to 2011, guiding them to the MTN Ghanaian FA Cup win in 2011. Nania scored against giants Kumasi Asante Kotoko 1–0 in the final at the Accra Sports stadium to win the club's first major top flight trophy.

=== Berekum Chelsea ===
In 2011, Walker was approached by Berekum Chelsea to join their technical team. Upon his appointment, he played a key role in Berekum Chelsea's campaign in the 2012 CAF Champions League when the team qualified to play in the group stages of the competition in their maiden campaign.

=== Accra Great Olympics ===
In February 2020, he was appointed the coach for the Teshie-based team Accra Great Olympics. Ahead of the 2020–21 Ghana Premier League season, in his capacity as the head coach, he set a top five finish target for the club, stating also that if they end up in a good position of ultimately challenging for the trophy they would surely put in a good fight. In January 2021, he took a sick leave which resulted in the appointment of Yaw Preko and Godwin Attram to serve as head coach and assistant respectively. He resumed his role as head coach in February 2021 and the two were relieved of their duties. Despite leading the league table on two occasions in the first round, in the second round of the league the team lost matches to teams on the bottom half of the table to eventually end the season in sixth position and miss out on the top four spot. In general the team's performance was better than they had performed in the previous season before it was cancelled.

=== Black Stars B ===
In November 2020, Walker disclosed that he was poised and ready to handle any national team job should he be given the opportunity to serve in one. On 27 April 2021, he was appointed head coach of the Black Stars B, in the process replacing Ibrahim Tanko who had been coaching the team for more than a year. After his appointment, he came out publicly to justify his appointment as the head coach of the Local Black Stars, stating that he deserved the job and was ready to do his best to prove his doubters wrong.

== Death ==
Walker died after a short illness at his residence in Accra, on 1 October 2025. He was 62.

== Honours ==
Nania FC

- Ghanaian FA Cup: 2011
- Ghana Super Cup: 2011

Individual

- Ghana Premier League Manager of the month: February 2022
