= Liyabé Kpatoumbi =

Togolese footballer

Personal information
- Full name: Liyabé Kpatoumbi
- Date of birth: 25 May 1986 (age 40)
- Place of birth: Atakpamé, Togo
- Height: 1.81 m (5 ft 11 1/2 in)
- Position: Striker

Team information
- Current team: ASKO Kara
- Number: 20

Youth career
- 2003–2008: ASKO Kara

Senior career*
Years	Team	Apps	(Gls)
2008–	ASKO Kara	33	(15)

International career
2004–2007	Togo U-20	12	(4)
2008–	Togo	1	(0)
- * Club domestic league appearances and goals

Liyabé Kpatoumbi (born 25 May 1986 in Atakpamé) is a Togolese football striker, who plays for ASKO Kara.

== Career ==
Kpatoumbi began his profi career 2008 with ASKO Kara who scored 15 goals in his first season.

== International career ==
He earned his first internationally match on 14 October 2009 in a friendly game against Japan national football team and played the 2010 UEMOA Tournament.
