= Latif Mohammed =

Ghanaian footballer

Personal information
- Full name: Mohammed Abdul Latif
- Date of birth: 22 January 1990 (age 36)
- Place of birth: Accra, Ghana
- Height: 1.75 m (5 ft 9 in)
- Position: Midfielder

Team information
- Current team: Futuro Kings
- Number: 15

Youth career
- Young Kotoko

Senior career*
Years	Team	Apps	(Gls)
2007–2009	Danbort FC		
2009–2010	Accra Great Olympics		
2010–2013	Ashanti Gold		
2013–2014	CF Mounana		
2016	Ilves		
2017	Lusaka Dynamos		
2017–201?	Sidama Coffee		
2019–	Futuro Kings		

International career
2014	Ghana	5	(0)
- * Club domestic league appearances and goals

Abdul Latif Mohammed (born 22 January 1990) is a Ghanaian professional footballer who plays for Equatorial Guinean club Futuro Kings FC as a midfielder.

== Career ==
Latif Mohammed has played for several Ghanaian teams and Gabon club as a left full back and midfielder.

== International career ==
In November 2013, coach Maxwell Konadu invited him to be a part of the Ghana squad for the 2013 WAFU Nations Cup. He helped the team to a first-place finish after Ghana beat Senegal by three goals to one. In January 2014 he also help the Ghana team for the African cup of Nations and was the runners up.
