= Ghana A' national football team =

National team for in-Ghana players

Ghana A'
- Nickname: Black Galaxies
- Association: Ghana Football Association (GFA)
- Confederation: CAF (Africa)
- Sub-confederation: WAFU (West Africa)
- Head coach: Annor Walker
- FIFA code: GHA
First colours	Second colours

African Nations Championship
- Appearances: 3 (first in 2009)
- Best result: Second place, 2009, 2014

WAFU Nations Cup
- Appearances: 5 (first in 2010)
- Best result: Champions, 2013, 2017

The Ghana A' national football team is the local national football team of Ghana and is open only to indigenous domestic league players. The team represents Ghana at the WAFU Nations Cup and the African Nations Championship and is controlled by the Ghana Football Association. Previously known as the Local Black Stars, the team is known as the Black Galaxies.

The Local Black Stars came second at the 2009 African Nations Championship, at the 2014 edition hosted in South Africa, Ghana reached the final again but lost in a penalty shoot-out to the Libya.

They have also appeared at the WAFU Nations Cup 4 times, hosting the tournament twice and winning the on both occasions in 2013 and 2017. The current coach of the side is Annor Walker. Maxwell Konadu and Ibrahim Tanko are former head coaches of the side.

== Squad ==
=== Previous squads ===
African Nations Championship squads

- CHAN 2009 squad
- CHAN 2011 squad
- CHAN 2014 squad
- CHAN 2022 squad

== Coaching staff ==
As of 15 April 2021

=== Current technical staff ===
Head coach	(Ghana) Annor Walker
Assistant Coach 1	(Ghana) Prosper Nartey Ogum
Goalkeeper coach	(Ghana) Richard Kingson
Welfare Officer	(Ghana) Edmund Ackah
Equipment Officer	(Ghana) Justice Kofi Mensah
Equipment Officer	(Ghana) Haruna Seidu
Team doctor	(Ghana) Prince Pamboe
Physical trainer	(Ghana) Emmanuel Armah
Masseur	(Ghana) Zakari Abdulai

Last updated: April 2021

Source: Ghana Football Association official website

=== Previous Head Coaches ===
- (Serbia) Milovan Rajevac (2009)
- (Ghana) Herbert Addo (January 2010– February 2011)
- (Ghana) Maxwell Konadu (November 2013–December 2020)
- (Ghana) Ibrahim Tanko (December 2020–April 2021)

== Competitive record ==
=== African Nations Championship ===
Year	Round	Position	Pld	W	D	L	GF	GA
(Ivory Coast) 2009	Runners-up	2nd	5	1	3	1	7	6
(Sudan) 2011	Group stage	14th	3	0	0	3	1	4
(South Africa) 2014	Runners-up	2nd	6	3	3	0	4	1
(Rwanda) 2016	Did not qualify							
(Morocco) 2018	Did not qualify							
(Cameroon) 2020	Did not qualify							
(Algeria) 2022	Quarter-finals	8th	3	1	0	2	4	5
(Kenya) (Tanzania) (Uganda) 2024	To be determined							
Total	4/7	0 title(s)	17	5	6	6	16	16

== Honours ==
African Nations Championship:

- Second place: 2009, 2014

WAFU Nations Cup

- Champions: 2013, 2017

== See also ==
- Ghana national football team
- Ghana Women's national team
