= 2010 WAFU Nations Cup =

2010 WAFU Nations Championship
WAFU Cup

Tournament details
- Host country: Nigeria
- Cities: Ijebu Ode and Abeokuta (Ogun State)
- Dates: 9–18 April 2010
- Teams: 8
- Venues: 2 (in 2 host cities)

Final positions
- Champions: Nigeria (1st title)
- Runners-up: Senegal
- Third place: Ghana
- Fourth place: Burkina Faso

Tournament statistics
- Matches played: 16
- Goals scored: 46 (2.88 per match)

The 2010 WAFU Nations Cup was the first edition of the WAFU Nations Cup, an association football tournament organised by the West African Football Union. The tournament was also held in 2002, but that edition was cancelled due to the civil war in the host nation Ivory Coast. The 2010 edition was held in Nigeria and was competed by eight national football team selections using only players from local leagues. The event took place between 9 and 18 April 2010 and was sponsored by ECOWAS.

The matches took place at two stadiums; Gateway International Stadium (Ijebu-Ode) and the MKO Abiola Stadium (Abeokuta).

== Group A ==
=== Table ===
	Pld	W	D	L	GF	GA	GD	Pts
Nigeria	3	3	0	0	11	1	+10	9
Senegal	3	1	1	1	4	2	+2	4
Guinea	3	1	0	2	1	8	−7	3
Benin	3	0	1	2	0	5	−5	1

=== Matches ===
9 April

Nigeria	4–0	Benin
	Report

9 April

Senegal	3–0	Guinea

11 April, 16:00

Guinea	0–5	Nigeria

11 April, 18:00

Benin	0–0	Senegal

13 April, 14:00

Nigeria	2–1	Senegal

13 April, 16:00

Guinea	1–0	Benin

== Group B ==
=== Table ===
	Pld	W	D	L	GF	GA	GD	Pts
Ghana	3	3	0	0	9	0	9	9
Burkina Faso	3	2	0	1	9	6	3	6
Liberia	3	1	0	2	4	6	−2	3
Togo	3	0	0	3	1	11	−10	0

=== Matches ===
10 April

Ghana	2–0	Togo

10 April

Burkina Faso	3–1	Liberia

12 April, 16:00

Liberia	0–3	Ghana

12 April, 18:00

Togo	1–6	Burkina Faso

14 April

Ghana	4–0	Burkina Faso

14 April, 16:00

Togo	0–3	Liberia

== Knockout stages ==
Semi-finals
16 April
Nigeria	1
Burkina Faso	0
16 April
Senegal	3
Ghana	1

Final
18 April
Nigeria	2
Senegal	0
Third place
18 April
Burkina Faso	0
Ghana	1

=== Semi-finals ===
16 April, 15:00

Nigeria	1–0	Burkina Faso
Musa	Report

MKO Abiola Stadium
16 April, 17:00

Senegal	3–1	Ghana
	Report

MKO Abiola Stadium

=== Third place ===
18 April

Burkina Faso	0–1	Ghana
	Report	Opoku 42'

MKO Abiola Stadium

=== Final ===
18 April

Nigeria	2–0	Senegal
Gabriel 52'; Okpako 87'	Report

MKO Abiola Stadium
