= 2011 UEMOA Tournament =

Tournament details
- Host country: Senegal
- City: Dakar
- Dates: 30 October-6 November 2011
- Teams: 8 (from 1 confederation)
- Venue: 1 (in 1 host city)

Final positions
- Champions: Senegal (2nd title)
- Runners-up: Mali

Tournament statistics
- Matches played: 13
- Goals scored: 25 (1.92 per match)

The 2011 UEMOA Tournament was the fifth edition of the competition.

== Group stage ==
=== Group A ===
Pos	Team	Pld	W	D	L	GF	GA	GD	Pts	Qualification
1	Senegal (H)	3	2	1	0	5	1	+4	7	Advance to Final
2	Burkina Faso	3	1	2	0	2	0	+2	5	
3	Togo	3	1	0	2	2	5	−3	3	
4	Ivory Coast	3	0	1	2	1	4	−3	1	

Rules for classification: Tiebreakers
(H) Hosts

=== Results ===
30 October 2011

Senegal	3-0	Togo
Pape Cire Dia 19', 54'; Aliou Cissé 82'	report

Stade Léopold Senghor
30 October 2011

Ivory Coast	0-0	Burkina Faso

Stade Léopold Senghor
1 November 2011

Togo	0-2	Burkina Faso
	report	Nii Plange 14', 71' (pen.)

Stade Léopold Senghor
1 November 2011

Senegal	2-1	Ivory Coast
Khassim Soumaré 8'; Mamading Kidiéra 87'	report	George Griffiths 11'

Stade Léopold Senghor
3 November 2011

Senegal	0-0	Burkina Faso
	report

Stade Léopold Senghor
3 November 2011

Ivory Coast	0-2	Togo
	report	Kondo Arimiyao 14'; Alikem Segbefia 90'

Stade Léopold Senghor

=== Group B ===
Pos	Team	Pld	W	D	L	GF	GA	GD	Pts	Qualification
1	Mali	3	2	1	0	5	2	+3	7	Advance to Final
2	Niger	3	1	2	0	4	3	+1	5	
3	Benin	3	1	1	1	4	2	+2	4	
4	Guinea-Bissau	3	0	0	3	2	8	−6	0	

Rules for classification: Tiebreakers

=== Results ===
30 October 2011

Niger	1-1	Benin
	report

Stade Léopold Senghor
30 October 2011

Mali	3-1	Guinea-Bissau
	report

Stade Léopold Senghor
1 November 2011

Benin	3-0	Guinea-Bissau
Jodel Dossou 7'; Isaac Louté 35' ? 75' (o.g.)	report

Stade Léopold Senghor
1 November 2011

Niger	1-1	Mali
Tiécoro Keita 20'	report	Mossi Issa Moussa 67' (pen.)

Stade Léopold Senghor
3 November 2011

Niger	2-1	Guinea-Bissau
Djibril Moussa Souna 29'; Mossi Issa Moussa 62'	report	Muller Nhaga 65'

Stade Léopold Senghor
3 November 2011

Mali	1-0	Benin
Ousmane Cissé 14'	report

Stade Léopold Senghor

== Final ==
6 November 2011

Senegal	1-0	Mali
Stéphane Badji 90+4'	report

Stade Léopold Senghor
