= 2002 WAFU Nations Cup =

The 2002 WAFU Nations Cup was the first edition of the WAFU Nations Cup tournament for football leagues in the Ivory Coast, but was affected by the outbreak of a civil war in the country.

== Overview ==
The tournament featured players from local leagues only. The qualifying phase was completed from 7 April to 7 July 2001. The final phase was originally scheduled to be played in Dakar, Senegal, from 28 September to 7 October 2001. The beginning of the tournament was first postponed to October, however, after the Confederation of African Football had refused to give approval of the initial date due to claims it was being played too close to the start of the 2002 African Cup of Nations (set to kick off on 19 January 2002). After WAFU argued that their tournament was for home-based players only, approval was obtained, and the tournament then moved to Abidjan, to be held in October 2001. It was then postponed again because the main sponsors, TV Africa, pulled out.

The tournament was finally arranged for 18 to 29 September 2002, to be held in Ivorian cities Abidjan and Bouaké, with the latter venue being added at the last moment. Unfortunately, one day into the tournament on 19 September, the First Ivorian Civil War broke out, leading to an indefinite postponement of the competition with the teams stranded in the country. The teams lodged in Bouaké were trapped there for over a week before being able to leave. Following this, the tournament would eventually be cancelled.

Eight years later, the first successful WAFU Nations Cup would be staged in Nigeria.

== Cancelled matches ==
Eight teams were planned to participate in the final tournament. The groups were:

- Group A: Senegal, Sierra Leone, Ivory Coast, Gambia
- Group B: Togo, Mali, Nigeria, Cape Verde

Only two matches in the tournament were played, both on 18 September 2002: Senegal 1–0 Sierra Leone and Ivory Coast 5–0 Gambia. All further matches were cancelled due to the civil war.
