= Richard Kingson =

Ghanaian footballer (born 1978)

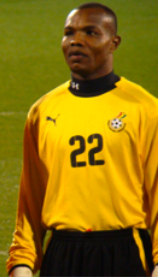
- Kingson with Ghana in 2008

Personal information
- Full name: Richard Kingson
- Date of birth: 13 June 1978 (age 48)
- Place of birth: Accra, Ghana
- Height: 1.83 m (6 ft 0 in)
- Position: Goalkeeper

Senior career*
Years	Team	Apps	(Gls)
1995–1996	Great Olympics	0	(0)
1996–2005	Galatasaray	27	(0)
1998–1999	→ Sakaryaspor (loan)	21	(0)
1999–2001	→ Göztepe (loan)	19	(0)
2001–2002	→ Antalyaspor (loan)	15	(0)
2002–2003	→ Elazığspor (loan)	20	(0)
2005–2007	Ankaraspor	4	(0)
2007	→ Hammarby (loan)	11	(0)
2007–2008	Birmingham City	1	(0)
2008–2010	Wigan Athletic	4	(0)
2010–2011	Blackpool	20	(0)
2013	Doxa Katokopias	10	(0)
2014	Balıkesirspor	13	(0)
2015	Great Olympics	0	(0)
Total		165	(0)

International career
1996–2012	Ghana	93	(1)

Managerial career
- 2017–2019: Ghana (goalkeeper coach)
- 2021: Ghana 'A' (goalkeeper coach)
- 2021–2024: Ghana (goalkeeper coach)
- * Club domestic league appearances and goals

Richard Kingson (born 13 June 1978) is a Ghanaian former professional footballer who played as a goalkeeper. He currently serves as a goalkeeper coach for the Ghana national football team. He is also known by his Turkish name Faruk Gürsoy and sometimes by the surname Kingston, which is the surname he used in his UEFA registration and also the surname of his brother Laryea Kingston. The different spelling of the surnames is due to "irregularity on his identity documents". Even in his native Ghana, he was quoted as "the man who got the 't' off his surname".

After leaving his home country, he played for several clubs in Turkey, for Hammarby in Sweden, and in England for Birmingham City, Wigan Athletic and Blackpool, who released him at the end of the 2010–11 season.

Kingson was the vice-captain for the Ghana national football team.

== Club career ==
=== Turkey ===
Kingson left his native Accra in 1996 to pursue a career in Turkey, where he represented six different clubs, and became a naturalised citizen, taking a Turkish name, Faruk Gürsoy, coming from Faruk Süren and Ergun Gürsoy. His first club in Turkey was Galatasaray S.K., whom he signed for in December 1996 but did not play a single game. On 2004–05 season when he played with Galatasaray again, he was suspended from football for six months after a failed doping test.

=== Birmingham City ===
After a three-month period on loan to Swedish club Hammarby IF, he drew attention from other clubs in Europe, including Aalborg, Maccabi Tel Aviv and Birmingham City, eventually joining the latter. On 28 August 2007, Kingson made his debut for Birmingham in a League Cup third round tie against Hereford United. He played once in the Premier League, in a 2–0 defeat to Portsmouth in caretaker manager Eric Black's only game in charge. At the end of the season, co-owner David Sullivan blamed the club's relegation on the quality of previous manager Steve Bruce's signings, branding Kingson a "complete waste of space". Kingson was disappointed and angered by the perceived unfairness of Sullivan's reaction, saying that "an older person, in his position, has to speak maturely. He has to be a responsible man as co-owner to speak well and set an example to younger people." The player's contract, which still had one year to run, was cancelled by mutual consent at the end of the 2007–08 season.

=== Wigan Athletic ===
Kingson joined up with former manager Steve Bruce when he signed for Wigan Athletic on 12 September 2008. He was given the number 22 shirt, the same number as he wears for Ghana. He made his first-team debut in the FA Cup third round tie against Tottenham Hotspur, where his side lost 3–1. He made his first Premier League appearance for the club when he replaced the injured Chris Kirkland after 10 minutes of the away match against West Bromwich Albion on 9 May 2009. He saved a penalty from Chris Brunt, but Brunt was able to score from the rebound, and the game ended as a 3–1 defeat. He was released after his contract expired at Wigan at the end of the 2009–10 season

=== Blackpool ===
Following his release by Wigan Athletic, he signed for Premier League newcomers Blackpool in September 2010. He made his debut for the Seasiders in a 3–2 defeat to Aston Villa on 10 November 2010. Following an injury to first-choice goalkeeper Matt Gilks, Kingson had an extended run in the first team. On 26 May 2011, Kingson was released, along with several other Blackpool players.

=== Doxa Katokopias ===
After two years out of the game, Kingson signed a one-year deal for Cypriot First Division club Doxa Katokopias in July 2013. He made his debut on the opening day of the league season, keeping a clean sheet as his team beat Nea Salamis 2–0.

=== Balıkesirspor ===
In January 2014, Kingson returned to Turkey, to play for Turkish second-tier side Balıkesirspor on a half-year plus two years deal.

=== Great Olympics ===
In 2015, Kingson was signed in a short-term contract by Great Olympics. The following year, Kingson stated he still dreamed of playing for Asante Kotoko before retiring and it was reported that he would be signed for the team, which was later denied.

== International career ==
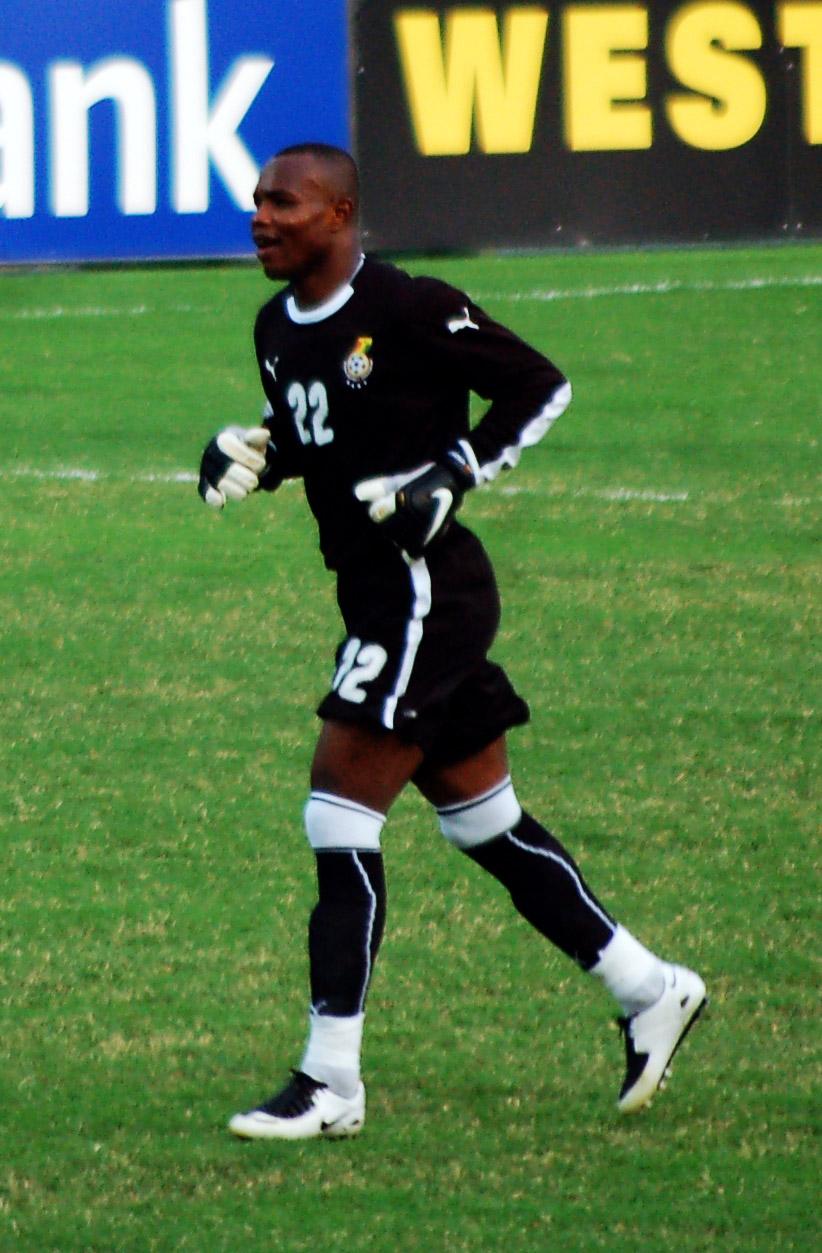
Kingson playing for Ghana at the 2008 Africa Cup of Nations

Kingson was the starting goalkeeper of the Ghana national team, and was called up for the 2006 FIFA World Cup, the 2008 Africa Cup of Nations and the 2010 FIFA World Cup.

During the 2006 World Cup, the Ghana Football Association misspelled that his name is Kingston; however, the player's shirt used the correct spelling of his name, as confirmed by Kingson himself.

He was voted as an All-Star Goalkeeper during the 2008 African Cup of Nations Tournament in Ghana. The Team of the Tournament was decided by the Technical Study Group (TSG) after careful observations of all the tournament's matches.

In 2008, he scored a goal for Ghana in a friendly – a late equaliser in a 1–1 draw against Tanzania.

As first-choice goalkeeper and team captain he was instrumental in leading Ghana to the final of the 2010 tournament, and was again selected for the all-star team along with Egypt goalkeeper Essam El-Hadary.

In the 2010 World Cup in South Africa, Kingson was selected in Ghana's opening game against Serbia, who had Vladimir Stojković, Kingson's fellow goalkeeper at Wigan Athletic in goal on the other side, keeping a clean sheet in The Black Stars 1–0 victory. In his next game he made a mistake in the 11th minute to give the lead to Australia in a group game which finished 1–1. His final group game ended in a narrow 1–0 defeat to Germany, but the team still qualified for the knock-out stages. In the match of 16 versus USA, he was voted Turkish Airlines Top of the Match after making several saves in the 2–1 extra time victory. The team then moved on to the quarter-finals, where a goal was prevented by a handball by Uruguayan striker [[Luis Suárez]] and which awarded Ghana a penalty kick. Ghana striker Asamoah Gyan missed the penalty and Ghana ultimately lost in a penalty shootout, with Sebastian Abreu winning it with a Panenka.

== Personal life ==
Kingson is the brother of Laryea Kingston, who was also a member of the Ghana national team. He is a naturalised citizen of Turkey and his Turkish name is Faruk Gürsoy. Kingson is married to Adelaide Tawiah. The ceremony took place in Ghana. Kingson's national teammates Asamoah Gyan and John Paintsil were among the guests at the wedding.

In 2012 a controversy arose when Kingson's wife during a prayer deliverance at the Synagogue Church of All Nations Church of T. B. Joshua in Nigeria confessed that she had used spirits to destroy Kingson's career and rendered him impotent. Kingson defended his wife by saying that it was not she who spoke but a spirit that spoke through her.

== Coaching career ==
After Kingson retired, he went into coaching. In May 2017, he was appointed as the goal keeper's coach for the Ghana national football team. In 2019, he was relieved of duties along with the whole technical team. After a reshuffle of the technical national teams, he was appointed as the goal keeper's coach of the Ghana A' national football team in June 2021.

Kingson also served as goal keeper's coach for his former club Accra Great Olympics in January 2021, when Yaw Preko served as the interim head coach. The following month, he joined Accra Hearts of Oak to serve in that same capacity for an interim period.

On 4 August 2021, he was reassigned to the Ghana national team as the goal keeper's coach.

== Career statistics ==
=== International ===
Appearances and goals by national team and year
National team	Year	Apps	Goals
Ghana	1996	8	0
Ghana	1997	2	0
Ghana	1998	4	0
Ghana	1999	5	0
Ghana	2000	9	0
Ghana	2001	2	0
Ghana	2002	1	0
Ghana	2004	1	0
Ghana	2006	10	0
Ghana	2007	7	0
Ghana	2008	15	1
Ghana	2009	8	0
Ghana	2010	16	0
Ghana	2011	5	0
Total		93	1

Scores and results list Ghana's goal tally first, score column indicates score after each Kingson goal.

List of international goals scored by Richard Kingson
No.	Date	Venue	Opponent	Score	Result	Competition	Ref.
1	20 August 2008	Benjamin Mkapa Stadium, Dar es Salaam, Tanzania	Tanzania	1–1	1–1	Friendly	

== Honours ==
Galatasaray S.K.

- Süper Lig: 1996–97, 1997–98
- Turkish Cup: 2004–05

Ghana

- Africa Cup of Nations runner-up: 2010; third place: 2008

Individual

- Africa Cup of Nations Team of the Tournament: 2008, 2010
