= 2009 UEMOA Tournament =

Tournament details
- Host country: Benin
- City: Cotonou
- Dates: 7 to 15 November
- Teams: 8 (from 1 confederation)
- Venue(s): 1 (in 1 host city)

Final positions
- Champions: Senegal
- Runners-up: Niger

This will be the third UEMOA Tournament contest. It is a competition for domestic-league football players from the eight UEMOA member countries: Mali, Côte d'Ivoire, Burkina Faso, Niger, Togo, Benin, Senegal and Guinea-Bissau.

The Togolese Football Federation announced their intention to host the tournament at Lomé but the tournament was hosted in Benin.

== Group stage ==
=== Group A ===
Pos	Team	Pld	W	D	L	GF	GA	GD	Pts	Qualification
1	Niger	3	2	1	0	5	1	+4	7	Advance to Final
2	Togo	3	2	1	0	3	1	+2	7	
3	Benin (H)	3	1	0	2	4	3	+1	3	
4	Guinea-Bissau	3	0	0	3	1	8	−7	0	

Rules for classification: Tiebreakers
(H) Hosts

=== Fixtures ===
22 November

Benin	0 - 1	Togo

Cotonou
22 November

Niger	3 - 0	Guinea-Bissau

Cotonou
24 November

Niger	1 - 1	Togo

Cotonou
24 November

Benin	4 - 1	Guinea-Bissau

Cotonou
26 November

Togo	1 - 0	Guinea-Bissau

Cotonou
26 November

Benin	0 - 1	Niger

Porto Novo

=== Group B ===
Pos	Team	Pld	W	D	L	GF	GA	GD	Pts	Qualification
1	Senegal	3	2	1	0	4	0	+4	7	Advance to Final
2	Ivory Coast	3	1	2	0	2	1	+1	5	
3	Mali	3	1	1	1	2	2	0	4	
4	Burkina Faso	3	0	0	3	0	5	−5	0	

Rules for classification: Tiebreakers

=== Fixtures ===
23 November

Senegal	3 - 0	Burkina Faso

Cotonou
23 November

Ivory Coast	1 - 1	Mali

25 November

Senegal	1 - 0	Mali

25 November

Burkina Faso	0 - 1	Ivory Coast

27 November

Mali	1 - 0	Burkina Faso

27 November

Ivory Coast	0 - 0	Senegal

Porto Novo

== Final ==
29 November 2009

Senegal	1 - 0	Niger
43' Traore Mamadou
