= Shafiu Mumuni =

Ghanaian footballer (born 1995)

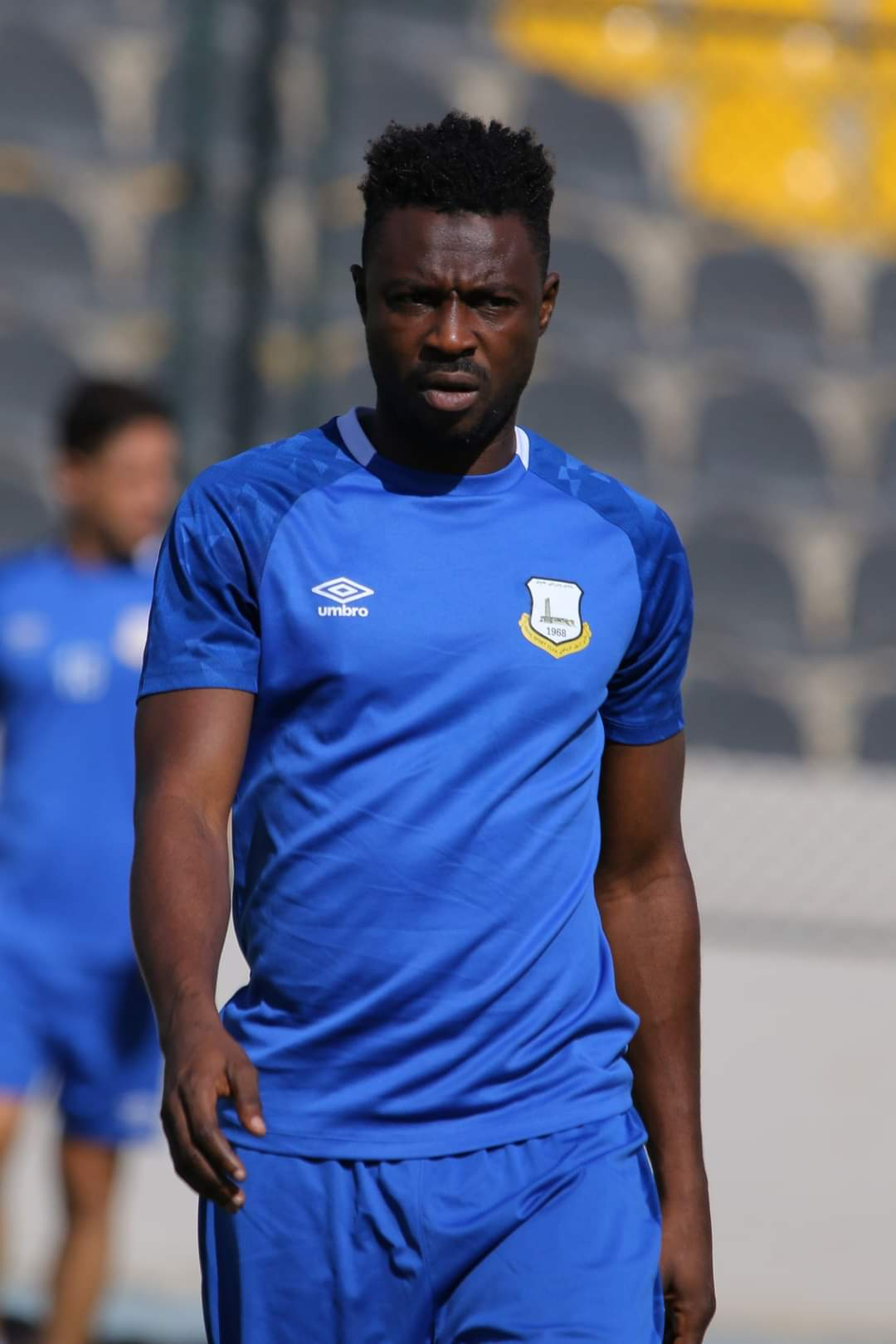
- Mumuni in Erbil training in 2021

Personal information
- Full name: Shafiu Mumuni
- Date of birth: 11 May 1995 (age 31)
- Place of birth: Accra, Ghana
- Position: Forward

Team information
- Current team: Al-Kahrabaa SC
- Number: 33

Senior career*
Years	Team	Apps	(Gls)
2011–2012	Wassaman United	12	(3)
2012–2020	Ashanti Gold	80	(24)
2020–2021	US Monastir	5	(0)
2021–2022	Erbil SC	7	(5)
2022	Al-Kahrabaa SC		
2022-23	Duhok SC		
2023–	Al-Kahrabaa SC	7	(1)

International career^{‡}
2019–	Ghana	8	(5)
Medal record
Men's football
Ashanti Gold
Winner	Ghana Premier League	2015
Representing Ghana
WAFU
Runner-up	2019 Senegal
- * Club domestic league appearances and goals as of 19 May 2024 @ 05:09(AEST) ‡ National team caps and goals as of 12 June 2021

Shafiu Mumuni (born 11 May 1995) is a Ghanaian professional footballer who last played as forward for Al-Kahrabaa SC. He has also represented the Ghana national team.

== Club career ==
=== Early career ===
He started his career with Agona Swedru-based Division Two side, ABS FC, as an attacking midfielder but soon caught the attention of newly promoted Premier League side, Wassaman United, whose coach, Herbert Addo, converted Mumuni into a striker after discovering his potential during the 2012–2013 season.

=== Ashanti Gold ===
After a successful Premiership debut, Ashanti Gold offered the young promising striker a 5-year contract at the start of the 2014-2015 league season with the view to develop him into a future asset for the club. That investment indeed paid off as Mumuni adjusted quickly into the Miners' set-up, leading to an excellent stint which saw him emerging as the club's top scorer season after season until he-2 parted ways with the club in July 2020. Before then, Mumuni won the league title, Edusei Cup and also led them to the CAF Confederation Cup and CAF Champions League on two occasions. On 27 October 2020, Mumuni left Ashanti Gold to sign a contract with US Monastir.

=== US Monastir ===
In October 2020, Shafiu signed a two-year deal with Tunisian Ligue Professionnelle 1 side US Monastir and featured regularly as the lead striker in the Tunisian League and the CAF Confederation Cup. However, a contractual breach by US Monastir led to an abrupt termination of the Mumuni's contract after just three months.

=== Erbil SC ===
Under the circumstance, terminating his contract with US Monsatir, in March 2021, Mumuni signed a four-month contract with Iraqi Super League side, Erbil SC, from March 1, 2021, to June 30, 2021, to maintain his form.

== International career ==
At the peak of Mumuni's career on the domestic scene in 2018, Mumuni was invited to the Black Stars B for a special Independence Anniversary match against Namibia in Windhoek which ended 1-1, with Mumuni fetching Ghana's equalizer. His crowning moment actually came when he captained Black Stars B to win silver at the 2019 WAFU Cup of Nations in Senegal. As an icing on the cake, Mumuni was awarded the Golden Boot after scoring four goals at the tournament, including a historic hat-trick against Ivory Coast in the semi-finals. That classic display compelled the then Black Stars coach, James Kwesi Appiah, to give Mumuni his maiden senior national team call-up against South Africa and São Tomé and Príncipe in the AFCON 2021 qualifiers in November 2019. After the COVID-19 pandemic.

== Career statistics ==
=== Club ===
As of 28 June 2021

Club	League		Cup		Continental		Total	
Club	Apps	Goals	Apps	Goals	Apps	Goals	Apps	Goals
Wassaman United								
Ashanti Gold								
US Monastir								
Erbil SC								
Career total								

=== International ===
As of 28 June 2021

National team	Year	Apps	Goals
Ghana
Ghana	2018		
Ghana	2019		
Ghana	2020		
Ghana	2021		
Total			

== Honours ==
Ashanti Gold

- Ghanaian Premier League: 2014–15
- Edusei Cup: 2019

Ghana

- WAFU Cup of Nations runner-up: 2019

Individual

- WAFU Cup of Nations Golden Boot: 2019
- WAFU Cup of Nations Best XI: 2019
