= 2013 UEMOA Tournament =

Tournament details
- Host country: Ivory Coast
- City: Abidjan
- Dates: 27 October – 2 November 2013
- Teams: 8 (from 1 confederation)
- Venue(s): 2 (in 1 host city)

Final positions
- Champions: Burkina Faso (1st title)
- Runners-up: Benin

Tournament statistics
- Matches played: 13
- Goals scored: 30 (2.31 per match)

The 2013 UEMOA Tournament was the sixth edition of the UEMOA Tournament. It was held in Abidjan, Côte d'Ivoire, from 27 October to 2 November 2013. The competition is used as a way of developing players in the West African region.

== Participants ==
- Benin
- Burkina Faso
- Guinea-Bissau
- Ivory Coast
- Mali
- Niger
- Senegal
- Togo

== Group stage ==
The draw for the group stage was conducted in Novotel Hotel in Abidjan on 30 August 2013.

=== Group A ===
Pos	Team	Pld	W	D	L	GF	GA	GD	Pts	Qualification
1	Burkina Faso	3	1	2	0	6	2	+4	5	Advance to Final
2	Mali	3	1	2	0	2	1	+1	5	
3	Ivory Coast (H)	3	1	1	1	4	4	0	4	
4	Togo	3	0	1	2	2	7	−5	1	

Rules for classification: Tiebreakers
(H) Hosts
26 October 2013

Ivory Coast	2 - 1	Togo

Stade Félix Houphouët-Boigny
Referee: Souleymane Namouano (Niger)
26 October 2013

Mali	0 - 0	Burkina Faso

Stade Robert Champroux
Referee: Gustave Tohouegnon (Benin)
28 October 2013

Togo	0 - 4	Burkina Faso

Stade Robert Champroux
Referee: Silvestre Cantussan (Guinea-Bissau)
28 October 2013

Ivory Coast	0 - 1	Mali

Stade Félix Houphouët-Boigny
Referee: Daouda Gueye (Senegal)
30 October 2013

Ivory Coast	2 - 2	Burkina Faso

Stade Félix Houphouët-Boigny
Referee: Souleymane Namouano (Niger)
30 October 2013

Mali	1 - 1	Togo

Stade Robert Champroux
Referee: Gustave Tohouegnon (Benin)

=== Group B ===
Pos	Team	Pld	W	D	L	GF	GA	GD	Pts	Qualification
1	Benin	3	2	1	0	9	1	+8	7	Advance to Final
2	Senegal	3	1	2	0	5	2	+3	5	
3	Niger	3	1	0	2	1	6	−5	3	
4	Guinea-Bissau	3	0	1	2	1	7	−6	1	

Rules for classification: Tiebreakers
27 October 2013

Senegal	1 - 1	Benin

Stade Robert Champroux
Referee: Louis Sanou (Burkina Faso)
27 October 2013

Niger	1 - 0	Guinea-Bissau

Stade Robert Champroux
Referee: Abou Coulibaly (Ivory Coast)
29 October 2013

Benin	5 - 0	Guinea-Bissau

Stade Robert Champroux
Referee: Kossi Azaleko (Togo)
29 October 2013

Senegal	3 - 0 (awd)	Niger

Stade Robert Champroux
Referee: Mahamadou Keita (Mali)
31 October 2013

Senegal	1 - 1	Guinea-Bissau

Stade Robert Champroux
Referee: Louis Sanou (Burkina Faso)
31 October 2013

Niger	0 - 3 (forfait)	Benin

Stade Robert Champroux

== Final ==
2 November 2013

Burkina Faso	0-0 (9-8p)	Benin

Stade Robert Champroux
Referee: Daouda Gueye (Senegal)
