= Jérôme Bonou =

Beninese footballer

Personal information
- Full name: Jérôme Agossa Bonou
- Date of birth: 27 November 1994 (age 31)
- Position: Midfielder

Team information
- Current team: ASPAC FC

Senior career*
| Years | Team | Apps | (Gls) |
| 2011–2017 | Onze Createurs de Niarela | | |
| 2018– | ASPAC FC | | |

International career^{‡}
| 2019– | Benin | 2 | (0) |
- * Club domestic league appearances and goals ‡ National team caps and goals as of 1 September 2019

Jérôme Agossa Bonou (born 27 November 1994) is a Beninese footballer who plays as a midfielder for ASPAC FC.
