= Kelvin Potis =

Liberian footballer

Personal information
- Date of birth: 22 April 2000 (age 26)
- Position: Midfielder

Team information
- Current team: Barrack Young Controllers FC

Senior career*
| Years | Team | Apps | (Gls) |
| 2016–2017 | Watanga FC | | |
| 2018– | Barrack Young Controllers FC | | |

International career^{‡}
| 2017 | Liberia | 1 | (0) |
- * Club domestic league appearances and goals ‡ National team caps and goals as of 1 September 2019

Kelvin Potis (born 22 April 2000) is a Liberian footballer who plays as a midfielder for Barrack Young Controllers FC.
