= UEMOA Tournament =

- Founded: 2007
- Region: Africa (CAF)
- Number of teams: 8
- Current champions: Senegal
- 2017 UEMOA Tournament

The UEMOA Tournament is a football (soccer) tournament held between nations who are a member of the West African Economic and Monetary Union (UEMOA). The tournament was first played in 2007. It is also called Coupe de l'intégration ouest africaine.

The teams are made up of players in national leagues of the organisation's member countries, in an effort to promote local talents.

== Participating nations ==
The participating nations are:

- Benin
- Burkina Faso
- Guinea-Bissau
- Mali
- Niger
- Ivory Coast
- Senegal
- Togo

== Past winners ==
The 2014 edition was cancelled because of an ebola outbreak. The next edition then was only played in 2016.

Year	Host nation	Final		
Year	Host nation	Champion	Score	Second Place
2007; Details	Burkina Faso	Ivory Coast	2-0	Niger
2008; Details	Mali	Ivory Coast	1-1 (6-5p)	Mali
2009; Details	Benin	Senegal	1-0	Niger
2010; Details	Niger	Niger	1-0	Benin
2011; Details	Senegal	Senegal	1-0	Mali
2013; Details	Ivory Coast	Burkina Faso	0-0 (9-8p)	Benin
2014	Togo	Cancelled due to the Ebola virus epidemic in West Africa.		
2016; Details	Togo	Senegal	1-0	Mali
2017? Details	Senegal			
