= Francis Kaboré =

Burkinabé footballer

Personal information
- Date of birth: 3 June 1994 (age 32)
- Place of birth: Yako, Burkina Faso
- Position: Forward

Team information
- Current team: Santos FC

Francis Kaboré is a Burkinabé professional footballer who plays as a forward for Burkinabé side Santos FC and the Burkina Faso national football team.

== International career ==
In January 2014, coach Brama Traore, invited him to be a part of the Burkina Faso squad for the 2014 African Nations Championship. The team was eliminated in the group stages after losing to Uganda and Zimbabwe and then drawing with Morocco.
