= 2008 UEMOA Tournament =

- UEMOA Tournament 2008 Logo

Tournament details
- Host country: Mali
- City: Bamako
- Teams: 8 (from 1 confederation)
- Venue: 1 (in 1 host city)

Final positions
- Champions: Ivory Coast
- Runners-up: Mali

Following are the results of the 2008 UEMOA Tournament, the soccer tournament held among member nations of the West African Economic and Monetary Union (UEMOA). The tournament is also called Coupe de l'intégration ouest africaine. All games were played in Bamako, Mali, at the Stade Modibo Keita.

== Group stage ==
=== Group A ===
Pos	Team	Pld	W	D	L	GF	GA	GD	Pts	Qualification
1	Burkina Faso	3	2	1	0	5	3	+2	7	
2	Mali (H)	3	2	0	1	10	4	+6	6	Advance to Final
3	Benin	3	1	1	1	5	2	+3	4	
4	Guinea-Bissau	3	0	0	3	1	12	−11	0	

Rules for classification: Tiebreakers
(H) Hosts

=== Results ===
2 November 2008

Mali	6 - 0	Guinea-Bissau
Lassana Fané 10' 52'; Sékou Camara 20' 25'; Souleymane Dembélé 36'; Bourama Traoré 74'

Stade Modibo Keïta, Bamako

2 November 2008

Burkina Faso	0 - 0	Benin

Stade Modibo Keïta, Bamako

4 November 2008

Guinea-Bissau	1 - 2	Burkina Faso
Djau Mamadu 74'		Kafando 24'; Simplice Yameogo

Stade Modibo Keïta, Bamako

4 November 2008

Mali	2 - 1	Benin
Yaya Coulibaly 16'; Camara		William Felix 55'

Stade Modibo Keïta, Bamako

6 November 2008

Benin	4-0	Guinea-Bissau
Owoussou Obed 25'; Nouhoum Kobena 45' 53' 75'

Stade Modibo Keïta, Bamako

6 November 2008

Burkina Faso	3-2	Mali
Karim Sogoba 28'; Souleymane Dembélé 55'; Sékou Camara 90'(pen)		Mamadou Thiombiano 42'(pen); Georges Bonou 87'

Stade Modibo Keïta, Bamako

=== Group B ===
Pos	Team	Pld	W	D	L	GF	GA	GD	Pts	Qualification
1	Ivory Coast	3	2	1	0	4	2	+2	7	Advance to Final
2	Niger	3	2	0	1	3	2	+1	6	
3	Senegal	3	1	0	2	1	2	−1	3	
4	Togo	3	0	1	2	1	3	−2	1	

Rules for classification: Tiebreakers

=== Results ===
3 November 2008

Ivory Coast	2 - 1	Niger
Amadou Kader 55' o.g. Mansouh Kouakou		Amani Moussa 18'

Stade Modibo Keïta, Bamako

3 November 2008

Senegal	1 - 0	Togo
Andre Diedhion

Stade Modibo Keïta, Bamako

5 November 2008

Niger	1 - 0	Senegal
Badiane Vitau 37'

Stade Modibo Keïta, Bamako

5 November 2008

Ivory Coast	1-1	Togo

Stade Modibo Keïta, Bamako

7 November 2008

Togo	0-1	Niger
		Zoumana Tahirou 82'

Stade Modibo Keïta, Bamako

7 November 2008

Senegal	0-1	Ivory Coast
		Guedegbé J. Arnaud 21'

Stade Modibo Keïta, Bamako

== Final ==
9 November 2008

Mali	1 - 1 5-6(p)	Ivory Coast
Souleymane Dembélé 77'		Corbin Guedegbé 37'

Stade Modibo Keïta, Bamako
