= Mamaye Coulibaly =

Malian footballer (born 1999)

Personal information
- Full name: Mamaye Fousseyni Coulibaly
- Date of birth: 13 December 1999 (age 26)
- Place of birth: Kayes, Mali
- Height: 1.78 m (5 ft 10 in)
- Position: Winger

Team information
- Current team: Stade Malien

Senior career*
Years	Team	Apps	(Gls)
2016–2018	Centre Salif Keita		
2018–2020	Stade Malien		
2020–2021	Dila Gori		
2021–	Stade Malien		

International career^{‡}
2019–	Mali	2	(0)
- * Club domestic league appearances and goals as of 00:11, 26 March 2021 (UTC) ‡ National team caps and goals as of 00:11, 26 March 2021 (UTC)

Mamaye Fousseyni Coulibaly (born 13 December 1999) is a Malian footballer who plays as a winger for Stade Malien and the Mali national team.

== International career ==
Coulibaly made his professional debut with the Mali national team in a 0–0 2020 African Nations Championship qualification tie with Mauritania on 21 September 2019.
