= Mohamed Al-Gadi =

Libyan footballer (born 1990)

Personal information
- Full name: Mohamed Al-Hnaish Al-Gadi Al-Shalabi
- Date of birth: 22 June 1990 (age 36)
- Place of birth: Az-Zawiyya, Libya
- Height: 1.90 m (6 ft 3 in)
- Position: Defensive midfielder

Team information
- Current team: Santa Clara
- Number: 26

Senior career*
Years	Team	Apps	(Gls)
2013–2015	Al-Ahly (Benghazi)		
2015–2016	Vitória de Setúbal	0	(0)
2016–	Santa Clara	5	(0)

International career^{‡}
2013–	Libya	20	(0)
Medal record
Men's football
Representing Libya
African Nations Championship
Winner	2014 South Africa
- * Club domestic league appearances and goals as of 08:21, 28 January 2017 (UTC) ‡ National team caps and goals as of 08:21, 28 January 2017 (UTC)

Mohamed Al-Hnaish Al-Gadi Al-Shalabi (born 22 June 1990) is a Libyan international footballer who plays for Portuguese club Santa Clara, as a defensive midfielder.

== Career ==
After playing in Libya with Al-Ahly (Benghazi), Al-Gadi signed for Portuguese club Vitória de Setúbal in July 2015, alongside fellow countryman Hamdou Elhouni. He moved to Santa Clara in the January 2016 transfer window.

He made his international debut for Libya in 2013.

== Honours ==
Libya

- African Nations Championship: 2014
