= Dominique Mendy =

Senegalese footballer

Personal information
- Date of birth: December 1, 1983 (age 42)
- Place of birth: Dakar, Senegal
- Height: 1.83 m (6 ft 0 in)
- Position: Midfielder

Youth career
- 1991–1997: Espoir Dakar

Senior career*
Years	Team	Apps	(Gls)
1998–1999	Grêmio	6	(0)
1999–2004	Troyes (B team)	56	(2)
2001–2004	Troyes	22	(2)
2004–2007	FC Dieppe	73	(2)
2007–2017	Olympique Noisy-le-Sec		
- * Club domestic league appearances and goals

Dominique Mendy (born December 1, 1983) is a Senegalese former professional footballer who plays as a midfielder. He played on the professional level in Ligue 2 for Troyes and in Campeonato Brasileiro Série A for Grêmio.
