= 2013 WAFU Nations Cup =

Tournament details
- Host country: Ghana
- Dates: 21–28 November
- Teams: 8 (from 1 sub-confederation)
- Venue: 2 (in 2 host cities)

Final positions
- Champions: Ghana (1st title)
- Runners-up: Senegal
- Third place: Togo
- Fourth place: Benin

Tournament statistics
- Matches played: 14
- Goals scored: 43 (3.07 per match)
- Top scorer: (Togo) Saibou Badarou
- Best player: (Senegal) Roger Gomis
- Best goalkeeper: (Senegal) Ousmane Mané

The 2013 WAFU Nations Cup (known as the Go!TV WAFU Cup for sponsorship reasons) is an international home-based football competition. It was hosted in Ghana. The competition was organised by the West African Football Union (WAFU). It was originally scheduled to take place between October 24 and November 3, however it was delayed and began on 21 November.

All games were played in Ashanti. The venues were the Baba Yara Stadium and the Len Clay Stadium. Ghana won the title after beating Senegal 3–1 in the final.

== Participants ==
- Benin
- Burkina Faso
- Liberia
- Ghana
- Niger
- Senegal
- Sierra Leone
- Togo

== Group stage ==
=== Group A ===
Pos	Team	Pld	W	D	L	GF	GA	GD	Pts	Qualification
1	Ghana	3	2	0	1	6	3	+3	6	Final
2	Benin	3	1	2	0	5	4	+1	5	Third place playoff
3	Burkina Faso	3	1	1	1	4	4	0	4	
4	Sierra Leone	3	0	1	2	3	7	−4	1	

Updated to match(es) played on 25 November 2013. Source:
21 November 2013
15:00

Ghana	4–1	Sierra Leone
Akuffu 25'; Annorbaah 48'; L. Mohammed 51'; S. Mohammed 70'	Report	Quee 10'; G. Fofanah (yellow card) ?' (yellow-red card) 67'

Baba Yara Stadium
Referee: Denis Dembele (Ivory Coast)
21 November 2013
17:00

Benin	2–2	Burkina Faso
Suanon 40', 69'	Report	Ouédraogo 21'; F. Kaboré 88'

Baba Yara Stadium
Referee: Joshua Amao (Nigeria)
23 November 2013
15:00

Sierra Leone	0–1	Burkina Faso
	Report	Nébié 28'; Daila (yellow card) ?' (yellow-red card) ?'

Baba Yara Stadium
Referee: Kokou Fagla (Togo)
23 November 2013
17:00

Ghana	0–1	Benin
	Report	Coréa 88' (pen.)

Baba Yara Stadium
Referee: Jerry Yekeh (Liberia)
25 November 2013
16:00

Ghana	2–1	Burkina Faso
Saka 19'; Y. Mohamed 54'	Report	M. Kaboré 42' (pen.)

Baba Yara Stadium
Referee: Joshua Amao (Nigeria)
25 November 2013
16:00

Sierra Leone	2–2	Benin
	Report	Suanon; Agonhoussou

Len Clay Stadium

=== Group B ===
Pos	Team	Pld	W	D	L	GF	GA	GD	Pts	Qualification
1	Senegal	3	3	0	0	7	1	+6	9	Final
2	Togo	3	2	0	1	8	4	+4	6	Third place playoff
3	Niger	3	0	1	2	2	6	−4	1	
4	Liberia	3	0	1	2	1	7	−6	1	

Updated to match(es) played on 26 November 2013. Source:
22 November 2013
16:00

Togo	1–3	Senegal
Badarou 90'	Report	N'Diaye 5', 15'; M'Baye 60'

Baba Yara Stadium
22 November 2013
16:00

Liberia	1–1	Niger
Varney 43'	Report	Youssouf 33'

Len Clay Stadium
24 November 2013
15:00

Liberia	0–4	Togo
Wulue (red card) 78'	Report	Badarou 63'; Kokouvi 82'; Arimiyaou 84'; Mani 90+2'

Baba Yara Stadium
Referee: Cecil Fleisher (Ghana)
24 November 2013
17:00

Niger	0–2	Senegal
	Report	Sagna 7'; Sarr 26'

Baba Yara Stadium
Referee: Igue Brice (Benin)
26 November 2013
15:00

Togo	3–1	Niger
Badarou ?'; Mani ?', ?'	Report	Youssouf ?' (pen.)

Baba Yara Stadium
26 November 2013
17:00

Senegal	2–0	Liberia
Mendy 2'; N'Diaye 49' (pen.)	Report

Baba Yara Stadium
Referee: Joseph Lamptey (Ghana)

== Knockout stage ==
=== Third place playoff ===
28 November 2013
14:30

Benin	1–2	Togo
Dossou 35'	Report	Nouwoklo 13'; Badarou 85'

Baba Yara Stadium
Referee: Joshua Amao (Nigeria)

=== Final ===
28 November 2013
16:30

Ghana	3–1	Senegal
Adusei 2' (pen.), 85' (pen.); L. Mohammed 78'	Report	Gomis 22'; Thioune (red card) 90+3'

Baba Yara Stadium
Referee: Jerry Yekeh (Liberia)

== Goalscorers ==
Saibou Badarou won the top-scorer award. He scored 3 goals.

3 goals

- (Togo) Saibou Badarou
- (Benin) Abdel Fadel Suanon
- (Senegal) Talla N'Diaye

2 goals

- (Togo) Sapol Mani
- (Ghana) Kwabena Adusei
- (Ghana) Latif Mohammed
- (Niger) Oumarou Alio Youssouf

1 goal

- (Benin) Iréké Agonhoussou
- (Benin) Cédric Coréa
- (Benin) Jodel Dossou
- (Burkina Faso) Francis Kaboré
- (Burkina Faso) Mohamed Kaboré
- (Burkina Faso) Oumarou Nébié
- (Burkina Faso) Bassirou Ouédraogo
- (Ghana) Michael Akuffu
- (Ghana) Theophilus Annorbaah
- (Ghana) Sulley Mohammed
- (Ghana) Yahaya Mohammed
- (Ghana) Godfred Saka
- (Liberia) Mohammed Varney
- (Senegal) Roger Gomis
- (Senegal) Soro M'Baye
- (Senegal) Dominique Mendy
- (Senegal) Richard Sagna
- (Senegal) Sidy Sarr
- (Sierra Leone) Kwame Quee
- (Togo) Kondo Arimiyaou
- (Togo) Gazozo Kokouvi
- (Togo) Martin Kossivi Nouwoklo
