= Maxwell Konadu =

Ghanaian footballer & manager (born 1972)

Personal information
- Date of birth: 4 December 1972 (age 53)
- Place of birth: Kumasi, Ashanti, Ghana
- Height: 1.83 m (6 ft 0 in)
- Position: Forward

Team information
- Current team: Black Leopards (Head coach)

Youth career
- Nkoranza Republican

Senior career*
Years	Team	Apps	(Gls)
1991–1993	Asante Kotoko		
1993–1994	CS Sfaxien		
1994–1995	Al-Arabi SC (Qatar)		
1995	SG Egelsbach	5	(2)
1996–1997	Asante Kotoko		
1997–1999	U.D. Leiria	37	(9)
1999–2000	Beira-Mar	22	(1)
2000–2001	Marinhense		
2003	King Faisal Babes		

International career
1997	Ghana	2	(0)

Managerial career
- 2009–2010: All Stars
- 2011–2012: Asante Kotoko
- 2011: Ghana U23 (Assistant coach)
- 2012–2013: Ghana (Assistant coach)
- 2012–2013: Ghana U-20
- 2013–2014: Ghana U-23
- 2014–2019: Ghana (Assistant coach)
- 2019-2020: Asante Kotoko
- 2022–2023: Legon Cities
- 2023–2024: Nsoatreman
- 2024–: Black Leopards
- * Club domestic league appearances and goals

Medal record

Men's association football

Representing Ghana

Olympic Games
Bronze medal – third place	1992 Barcelona	Team competition

Maxwell Konadu (born 4 December 1972) is a Ghanaian football coach and former player. He is the coach of Black Leopards. Before his current post, he was the manager of Ghana Premier League club Asante Kotoko. Konadu made two appearances for the Ghana national team and was a member of the Ghana national team that won the bronze medal at the 1992 Summer Olympics in Barcelona, Spain. He also won gold as assistant coach of Ghana's Men's Olympic Team at the All-Africa Games in Maputo, Mozambique in 2011.

== Playing career ==
Konadu began his youth career with Nkoranza Republic and Upper West Republic in Ghana. He began his professional career with the Kumasi Asante Kotoko FC, with whom he won the Ghana Premier League in his debut season.

After brief spells playing in Tunisia and Germany, he returned to Asante Kotoko in January 1996, before moving to U.D. Leiria of the Portuguese second division in July of the following year. He would play for Leiria in the Portuguese Liga during the 1998–99 season, and then moved to rival but relegated lower division club Beira-Mar, and Marinhense.

He then had a brief spell playing in Turkey, before returning to play for Ghanaian side King Faisal Babes in 2003.

== Coaching career ==
Following his playing career, Konadu became a coach. First interning at Ghana's Feyenoord Academy before taking on the assistant coach position of Red Bull Academy's U-17 team in Sogakope.

After participating in the 31st and 32nd International DFB (German Football Association) coaching courses in Hennef, Germany, he received the International DFB Coaching Certificates "B" and "A" in 2008 and 2009 respectively. By then, he had moved to Ghana Premier League club All Stars F.C., leading them during the 2009–10 and 2010–11 seasons.

In July 2011, Konadu was appointed as assistant coach of Asante Kotoko, the club where he first gained fame as a prolific goal scorer. He however signed on as head coach following his return from the All-Africa Games in Maputo, Mozambique, following the sacking of Serbian coach Bogdan Korak. On 3 May 2012, Konadu was appointed as the assistant coach of the Ghana national team by the GFA (Ghana Football Association), succeeding James Kwesi Appiah. On 5 June 2012, Konadu resigned as manager of Ghana Premier League club Asante Kotoko after guiding the club to their 22nd league title and securing qualification to the 2013 CAF Champions League. Konadu was succeeded as manager of Asante Kotoko by, Mas-ud Didi Dramani. On 10 July 2012, Konadu was appointed as the manager of the Ghana national under-20 football team, succeeding Orlando Wellington. Furthermore, in January 2013, Konadu was appointed as the manager of the Ghana under-23 national team.

He was appointed caretaker manager of the men's senior national team, for the second time, in March 2017. He also served as coach of the "local Black Stars" - GHana A' national team.

During his time at Legon Cities he was Ghana Premier League Manager of the Month for April 2022.

He was appointed head coach of South African National First Division side Black Leopards in July 2024.

== Honours ==
=== Player ===
Asante Kotoko

- Ghana Premier League: 1991–92, 1992–93

Ghana U23

- Summer Olympics bronze medalist: 1992

=== Manager ===
Asante Kotoko

- Ghana Premier League: 2011–12
- President's Cup: 2019

Ghana A

- WAFU Nations Cup: 2013, 2017

Nsoatreman F.C.

- Ghana FA Cup: 2023–24

Individual

- WAFU Nations Cup Coach of the Tournament: 2019
