= WAFU Nations Cup =

- Organiser(s): WAFU
- Founded: 2002; 24 years ago
- Region: West Africa
- Teams: 16
- Current champions: Senegal
- Most championships: Ghana (2 titles)
- Broadcaster: ESPN Africa
- Website: wafucup.com
- 2021 WAFU Cup of Nations

The WAFU Nations Cup (also known as the WAFU Cup of Nations or simply the WAFU Cup) is an association football competition that is contested by representative teams of the West African Football Union.

== History ==
A trophy was commissioned by President Gnassingbé Eyadéma of Togo in 1974 with a view to establishing a regional competition similar to the Africa Cup of Nations tournament. The maiden event was hosted in Abidjan and the hosts Ivory Coast won the tournament.

The West African Nations Cup (Zone 3) commenced in 1982 on an annual basis (not in 1985), and was played until 1987. Meanwhile, in 1983 ECOWAS (French:CEDEAO) create another tournament, the CEDEAO Cup (Zone 3) and it was played on a bi-annual basis until 1991.

Zone 2 also had their own tournament created, the Amílcar Cabral Cup, named after the liberator of Guinea-Bissau, Amílcar Cabral.

The West African Nations Cup returned in 2002 as the WAFU Nations Cup, however, officially it was not considered simply as a continuation of the old tournament, and therefore it is a new tournament. The 2002 edition was short-lived after violence broke out in Ivory Coast. Two games of the tournament had been played when it was cancelled. Finally, after an eight-year wait, the tournament returned in April 2010 which Nigeria's Ogun State hosted and the host nation won.

The 2019 edition was held in Senegal, and the 2021 tournament was supposed to be hosted by Nigeria but the tournament didn't come to fruition.

== Tournament history ==
Year	Host	Final			Third place match		
Year	Host	Winner	Score	Runner-up	Third place	Score	Fourth place
2002; Details	Ivory Coast	Abandoned one day into tournament due to the First Ivorian Civil War.					
2010; Details	Nigeria	Nigeria	2–0	Senegal	Ghana	1–0	Burkina Faso
2011; Details	Nigeria	Togo	3–2	Nigeria	Liberia	3–1	Ghana
2013; Details	Ghana	Ghana	3–1	Senegal	Togo	2–1	Benin
2017; Details	Ghana	Ghana	4–1	Nigeria	Niger	2–1	Benin
2019; Details	Senegal	Senegal	1–1 (3–1 P)	Ghana	No third place match played		
2021; Details	Nigeria						

== See also ==
- UEMOA Tournament
- Amílcar Cabral Cup (a tournament played between 1979 and 2007)
- West African Nations Cup (a tournament played in the 1980s)
- CEDEAO Cup (a tournament played in the 1980s and early 1990s)
- West Africa Champions Cup (a tournament played in the 2022s)
