= List of African Nations Championship finals =

African Nations Championship final
- Organiser(s): CAF
- Founded: 2009; 17 years ago
- Abolished: 2025; 1 year ago
- Region: Africa
- Last champions: Morocco (3rd title)
- Most championships: Morocco (3 titles)

The African Nations Championship was a biennial football competition run by the Confederation of African Football (CAF). Established in 2009, it was contested by CAF's national teams featuring players playing in their local leagues.

The tournament had 8 editions between 2009 & 2024, with Morocco being the most successful team claiming 3 titles. In 2025, it was abolished to be replaced by the African Nations League.

== List of finals ==
Key to the list
a.e.t.	Result after extra time
pen.	Match was won on a penalty shoot-out

List of finals of the Africa Cup of Nations
Tournament	Winners	Score	Runners-up	Venue	Location	Attendance	Ref.
2009	DR Congo	2–0	Ghana	Felix Houphouet Boigny Stadium	Abidjan, Ivory Coast	35,000	
2011	Tunisia	3–0	Angola	Al-Merrikh Stadium	Omdurman, Sudan	43,000	
2014	Libya	0–0 (4–3 p)	Ghana	Cape Town Stadium	Cape Town, South Africa	16,505	
2016	DR Congo	3–0	Mali	Amahoro Stadium	Kigali, Rwanda	25,000	
2018	Morocco	4–0	Nigeria	Stade Mohammed V	Casablanca, Morocco	75,000	
2020	Morocco	2–0	Mali	Ahmadou Ahidjo Stadium	Yaoundé, Cameroon		
2022	Senegal	0–0 (5–4 p)	Algeria	Nelson Mandela Stadium	Algiers, Algeria	39,120	
2024	Morocco	3–2	Madagascar	Moi International Sports Centre	Nairobi, Kenya	45,528	

== Results by nation ==
Final match venue locations

Years shown in bold indicate that the country also hosted that tournament.

Team	Winners	Runners-up	Total finals
Morocco	3 (**2018**, 2020, 2024)	—	3
DR Congo	2 (2009, 2016)	—	2
Tunisia	1 (2011)	—	1
Senegal	1 (2022)	—	1
Libya	1 (2014)	—	1
Ghana	—	2 (2009, 2014)	2
Mali	—	2 (2016, 2020)	2
Angola	—	1 (2011)	1
Nigeria	—	1 (2018)	1
Algeria	—	1 (**2022**)	1
Madagascar	—	1 (2024)	1

== See also ==
- List of Africa Cup of Nations finals
