= 2020 African Nations Championship final =

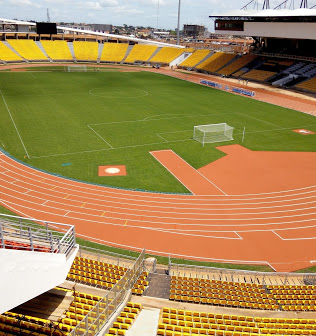
- Event: 2020 African Nations Championship
Mali	Morocco
(Mali)	(Morocco)
0	2
- Date: 7 February 2021
- Venue: Ahmadou Ahidjo Stadium, Yaoundé
- Referee: Peter Waweru (Kenya)
- Man of the Match: Anas Zniti (Morocco)

The 2020 African Nations Championship final was a football match to determine the winners of the CHAN 2020 tournament and took place on 7 February 2021 at the Ahmadou Ahidjo Stadium in Yaoundé, Cameroon. It was contested by Mali and Morocco.

Morocco won 2-0 to claim their second title. By doing so, they became the first team to win back-to-back titles since the tournament's inaugural edition in 2009. They also tied with DR Congo as the most successful teams in the tournament.

== Venue ==
The final was held at the multi-purpose Stade Ahmadou Ahidjo in the capital city of Yaoundé, Cameroon. Built in 1972, it currently has a capacity of 40,000 seats. It is used mostly for football matches and is named after Ahmadou Ahidjo, who was President of Cameroon from 1960 until 1982. The stadium has been renovated in 2016 ahead of the Africa Women Cup of Nations tournament. It is the home stadium of Canon Yaoundé and Tonnerre Yaoundé. The stadium is also known as the home venue of the Cameroonian national football team, who drew the stadium's record attendance of 120,000 in a football match in the 1980s.

== Background ==
Mali and Morocco both made their 4th appearance at the tournament, and their second final. Mali previously contested the final in 2016 losing 3-0 to DR Congo. Morocco meanwhile reached the final of the previous edition defeating Nigeria 4-0 to become the first host nation to win the title. The final was also the first meeting between the two sides at the CHAN tournament.

Mali were 57th in the FIFA World Rankings (9th among African nations), while Morocco were 35th (4th among African nations).

== Route to the final ==
Mali
Round
Morocco
Opponents
Result
Group stage
Opponents
Result
Burkina Faso
1–0
Match 1
Togo
1–0
Cameroon
1–1
Match 2
Rwanda
0–0
Zimbabwe
1–0
Match 3
Uganda
5–2
Group A winner

Pos	Team	Pld	Pts
1	Mali	3	7
2	Cameroon	3	5
3	Burkina Faso	3	4
4	Zimbabwe	3	0

Source: CAF
Final standings
Group C winner

Pos	Team	Pld	Pts
1	Morocco	3	7
2	Rwanda	3	5
3	Togo	3	3
4	Uganda	3	1

Source: CAF
Opponents
Result
Knockout stage
Opponents
Result
Congo
0–0 (a.e.t.) (5–4 p)
Quarter-finals
Zambia
3–1
Guinea
0–0 (a.e.t.) (5–4 p)
Semi-finals
Cameroon
4–0

== Match ==
=== Details ===
7 February 2021
20:00 WAT

Mali	0–2	Morocco
	Report	Bouftini 68'; El Kaabi 79'

Ahmadou Ahidjo Stadium, Yaoundé
Referee: Peter Waweru (Kenya)

== See also ==
- 2020 African Nations Championship
