= 2018 African Nations Championship final =

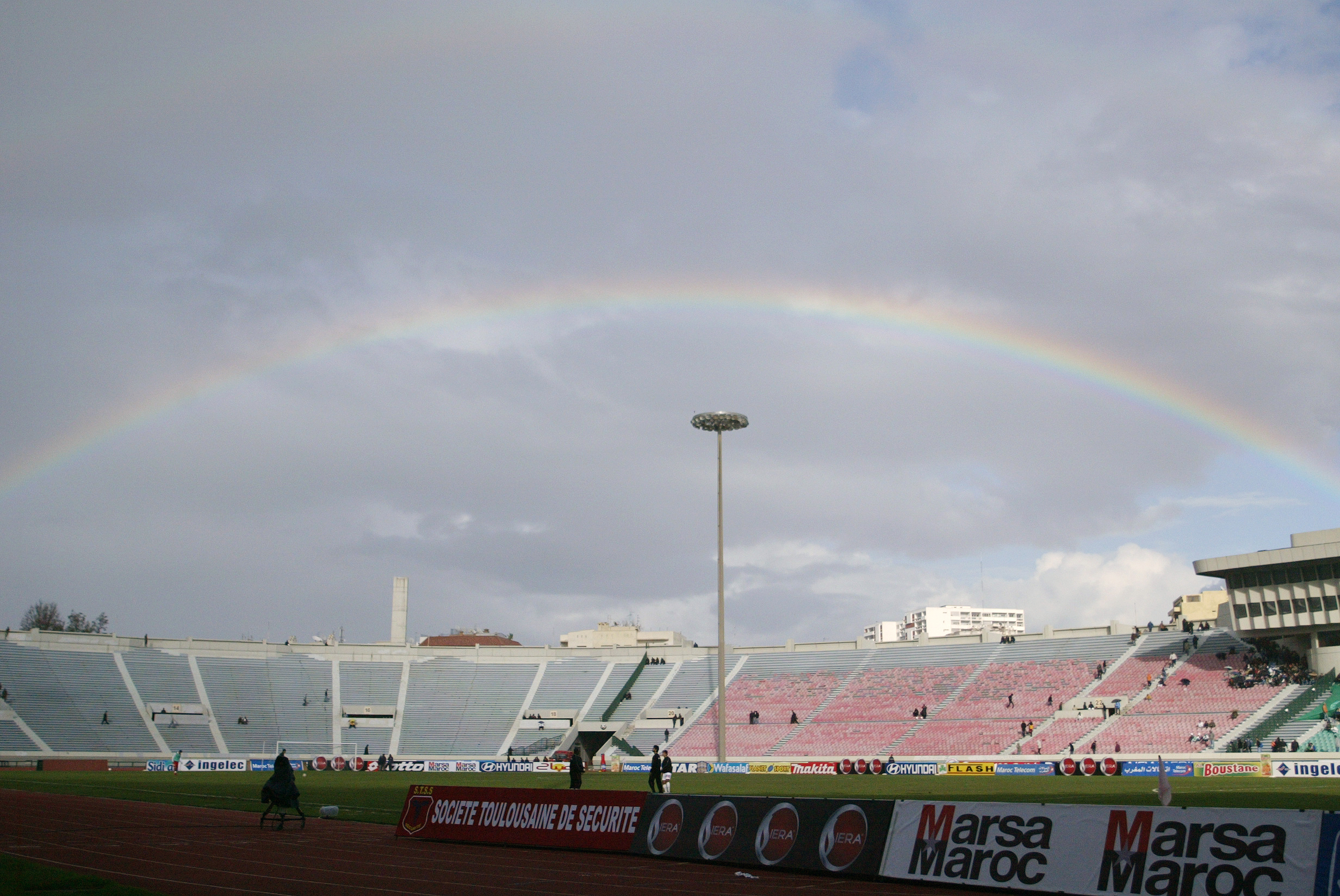
- Event: 2018 African Nations Championship
| Morocco | Nigeria |
| (Morocco) | (Nigeria) |
| 4 | 0 |
- Date: 4 February 2018
- Venue: Stade Mohammed V, Casablanca
- Man of the Match: Zakaria Hadraf (Morocco)
- Referee: Bakary Gassama
- Attendance: 75,000

The 2018 African Nations Championship final was a football match to determine the winners of the CHAN 2018 tournament and took place on 4 February 2018 at the Stade Mohammed V in Casablanca, Morocco and it was contested by Morocco the host nation and Nigeria. This was the first time since tournament was introduced in 2009 that a host nation reached the final. Before this match the two teams met in the 2014 CHAN tournament at the quarter-finals stage, which Nigeria won 4–3 after extra time.

Morocco won the match 4–0, winning the title for the first time and becoming the first and only team to win the tournament on home soil.

== Venue ==
The final was held at the Stade Mohammed V in the heart of the city of Casablanca, Morocco, in the western part of Maarif district. The stadium has hosted numerous international sporting events, including the 1983 Mediterranean Games, the 1988 Africa Cup of Nations final, the 2013 African U-17 Championship as well as the CAF Super Cup final twice in 2000 and more recently in 2018 played on 23 February 2018, shortly after the CHAN final.

== Background ==
Morocco appeared in their 3rd tournament, and their 1st final. There previous best performance in the competition was reaching the quarterfinal in the 2014 CHAN. Nigeria also appeared in their 3rd tournament, and their 1st final. There previous best performance was reaching the semifinals of the 2014 CHAN. Morocco and Nigeria had met once in the competition before, the time when Nigeria knocked Morocco out of the 2014 CHAN after defeating them 4–3 in extra time, in the quarterfinals after Abubakar Aliyu Ibrahim scored the winner at the 111th minute.

Morocco were 39th in the FIFA World Rankings (4th among African nations), while Nigeria were 51st (9th among African nations).

== Route to the final ==
Morocco
Round
Nigeria
Opponents
Result
Group stage
Opponents
Result
Mauritania
4–0
Match 1
Rwanda
0–0
Guinea
3–1
Match 2
Libya
1–0
Sudan
0–0
Match 3
Equatorial Guinea
3–1
Group A winner

| Pos | Team | Pld | Pts |
|---|---|---|---|
| 1 | Morocco (H) | 3 | 7 |
| 2 | Sudan | 3 | 7 |
| 3 | Guinea | 3 | 3 |
| 4 | Mauritania | 3 | 0 |

Source: CAF
(H) Hosts
Final standings
Group C winner

| Pos | Team | Pld | Pts |
|---|---|---|---|
| 1 | Nigeria | 3 | 7 |
| 2 | Libya | 3 | 6 |
| 3 | Rwanda | 3 | 4 |
| 4 | Equatorial Guinea | 3 | 0 |

Source: CAF
Opponents
Result
Knockout stage
Opponents
Result
Namibia
2–0
Quarter-finals
Angola
2–1 (a.e.t.)
Libya
3–1 (a.e.t.)
Semi-finals
Sudan
1–0

== Match ==
=== Summary ===
Morocco's first chance came in the third minute when Walid El Karti flicked the ball in from close range. The hosts thought they had scored just four minutes later when Ayoub El Kaabi headed home, only for the assistant referee's flag to go up – claiming the corner had swung out of play before it reached the striker. Morocco unsettled Nigeria with their early dominance as the West Africans laboured in search of their rhythm. And they kept the Nigerian backline busy till the quarter-hour mark during which Ayoub El Kaabi was denied by the crossbar from a Zakaria Hadraf cross from the left. The Super Eagles came into the fore around the 20th minute mark but rarely threatened the Moroccan defence.

Just before the break, the stadium came alive with the opener courtesy Hadraf. Captain Badr Benoun went on a solo run beating two players and found Abdeljalil Jbira whose cross was slotted home by Hadraf to send the stadium into raptures. Nigeria relied mainly on long balls forward for their attacks and Morocco's Anas Zniti did not have a serious save to make before half-time. Trailing by a lone goal, Nigeria’s chances of a comeback were dealt a severe blow two minutes after recess when Peter Moses was sent off for a second yellow card after fouling Hadraf.

The second goal came on 61 minutes through El Karti, and yet again, Ismail Haddad was the architect. El Kaabi was for the second time denied the post and Haddad pounced on the loose ball and fired a shot on goal that Nigeria goalkeeper Dele Ajiboye parried for El Karti to head home the rebound. Hadraf completed his brace two minutes later after Ajiboye made a weak touch of a Haddad cross, and the former tapped home the rebound to take the game beyond the Nigerians. El Kaabi finally registered his name of the scoring cards, firing past Ajiboye from close range on 74 minutes for his ninth of the competition, and seal victory.

Morocco thus won its first major continental championship since their 1976 African Cup of Nations triumph.

=== Details ===
4 February 2018
19:00 WET

| Morocco | 4–0 | Nigeria |
|---|---|---|
| Hadraf 44', 64'; El Karti 61'; El Kaabi 73' | Report |

Stade Mohamed V, Casablanca
Attendance: 75,000
Referee: Bakary Gassama (Gambia)

| Morocco | Nigeria |

| GK | 1 | Anas Zniti |
| RB | 16 | Mohamed Nahiri |
| CB | 5 | Jawad El Yamiq |
| CB | 13 | Badr Benoun (c) | (yellow card) 77' |
| LB | 20 | Abdeljalil Jbira |
| RM | 7 | Zakaria Hadraf | | (substituted off) 72' |
| CM | 8 | Salaheddine Saidi |
| CM | 6 | Badr Boulahroud | (yellow card) 52' | (substituted off) 60' |
| LM | 11 | Ismail El Haddad |
| SS | 10 | Walid El Karti |
| CF | 9 | Ayoub El Kaabi | | (substituted off) 82' |
Substitutions:
| MF | 19 | Barrahma El Mehdi | | (substituted on) 60' |
| FW | 14 | Ahmed Hammoudan | | (substituted on) 72' |
| FW | 23 | Ayoub Nanah | | (substituted on) 82' |
Manager:
Jamal Sellami

| GK | 16 | Dele Ajiboye |
| RB | 2 | Osas Okoro | (yellow card) 34' |
| CB | 6 | Stephen Eze |
| CB | 5 | Orji Kalu (c) |
| LB | 12 | Ikouwem Udo |
| DM | 4 | Emeka Atuloma |
| CM | 10 | Rabiu Ali | | (substituted off) 57' |
| CM | 15 | Dayo Ojo |
| RF | 7 | Emeka Ogbugh | | (substituted off) 53' |
| CF | 22 | Gabriel Okechukwu |
| LF | 11 | Peter Moses | (yellow card) 44' (yellow-red card) 49' |
Substitutions:
| FW | 9 | Anthony Okpotu | | (substituted on) 53' |
| MF | 18 | Augustine Oladapo | | (substituted on) 57' |
Manager:
Salisu Yusuf

Man of the Match:
Zakaria Hadraf (Morocco)

Assistant referees:
Jerson Emiliano Dos Santos (Angola)
Marwa Range (Kenya)
Fourth official:
Bamlak Tessema Weyesa (Ethiopia)

Match rules

- 90 minutes.
- 30 minutes of extra time if necessary.
- Penalty shoot-out if scores still level.
- Maximum of three substitutions.

=== Records ===
This final witnessed some records, like:

1. Morocco's became the first host nation to claim the CHAN title.
2. Morocco won its first major continental championship since their triumph in the 1976 African Cup of Nations.

== See also ==
- 2018 African Nations Championship
