= Mumbere =

Mumbere is a surname. Notable people with this surname include:

- Charles Mumbere, King of Rwenzururu
- Jérémie Mumbere, Congolese footballer
