= Augustine Mulenga =

Zambian footballer (born 1990)

Personal information
- Full name: Augustine Kabaso Mulenga
- Date of birth: 17 January 1990 (age 36)
- Place of birth: Lusaka, Zambia
- Height: 1.78 m (5 ft 10 in)
- Position: Forward

Team information
- Current team: AmaZulu FC
- Number: 11

Senior career*
Years	Team	Apps	(Gls)
2012–2013	Nkwazi		
2014–2015	Nkana		
2016–2018	Zanaco		
2018–2020	Orlando Pirates	40	(6)
2020–2022	AmaZulu FC	39	(8)
2022–2023	NAPSA Stars		
2023–2024	Chippa United	16	(0)
2024–	AmaZulu FC	13	(1)

International career^{‡}
2017–2021	Zambia	33	(5)
- * Club domestic league appearances and goals as of 1 August 2024 ‡ National team caps and goals as of 23 October 2022

Augustine Kabaso Mulenga (born 17 January 1990) is a Zambian football player. He plays for AmaZulu FC.

== Club career ==
In January 2018, Mulenga joined South African Premier Division club Orlando Pirates. He made his Premier Division debut on 3 March 2018, coming on as an 84th minute sub for Justin Shonga in a 3–1 home victory over Kaizer Chiefs. Mulenga scored his first competitive goal for the club on 4 April 2018 in a 2-1 league victory over Bloemfontein Celtic. His goal, assisted by Thembinkosi Lorch, was scored in the 77th minute.

== International ==
He made his Zambia national football team debut on 26 March 2017 in a friendly game against Zimbabwe.

=== International goals ===
Scores and results list Zambia's goal tally first.

No	Date	Venue	Opponent	Score	Result	Competition
1.	14 January 2018	Stade de Marrakech, Marrakesh, Morocco	Uganda	2–1	3–1	2018 African Nations Championship
2.	18 January 2018	Stade de Marrakech, Marrakesh, Morocco	Ivory Coast	1–0	2–0	2018 African Nations Championship
3.	18 January 2018	Stade de Marrakech, Marrakesh, Morocco	Ivory Coast	2–0	2–0	2018 African Nations Championship
4.	23 March 2019	Heroes National Stadium, Lusaka, Zambia	Namibia	1–0	4–1	2019 Africa Cup of Nations qualification
5.	23 March 2019	Heroes National Stadium, Lusaka, Zambia	Namibia	3–0	4–1	2019 Africa Cup of Nations qualification
