= Stephen Eze =

Nigerian professional footballer

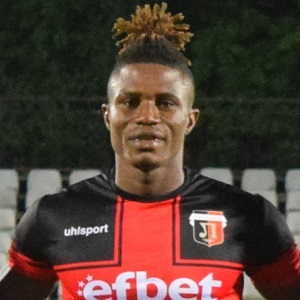
- Eze with Lokomotiv Plovdiv in 2018

Personal information
- Date of birth: 8 March 1994 (age 32)
- Place of birth: Makurdi, Nigeria
- Height: 1.98 m (6 ft 6 in)
- Position: Centre-back

Team information
- Current team: Odisha

Senior career*
Years	Team	Apps	(Gls)
2012–2014	Lobi Stars		
2014–2016	Sunshine Stars	63	(3)
2017	Ifeanyi Ubah	29	(0)
2017	Kano Pillars	0	(0)
2018–2019	Lokomotiv Plovdiv	57	(3)
2020	Tobol	0	(0)
2020–2021	Jamshedpur	20	(4)
2022	NK Solin	1	(0)
2022–2023	Queen's Park	22	(3)
2023–2024	Quang Nam	25	(2)
2024–2026	Jamshedpur	34	(6)
2026–	Odisha	2	(0)

International career^{‡}
2015–2018	Nigeria	11	(0)
- * Club domestic league appearances and goals as of 17 October 2026 ‡ National team caps and goals as of 28 July 2019

Stephen Eze (born 8 March 1994) is a Nigerian professional footballer who plays as a defender for the Indian Super League club Odisha.

He has 11 caps with the Nigeria national team.

== Club career ==
=== In Nigeria ===
Eze started his professional career at Lobi Stars. He played regularly during two seasons, before moving to Sunshine Stars in September 2014.

After two seasons with Sunshine, Eze joined Ifeanyi Ubah where he won Nigeria Super Cup in early 2017. On 9 November 2017, Eze joined Kano Pillars.

=== Lokomotiv Plovdiv ===
Two months later, on 18 January 2018, Eze joined Bulgarian First League club Lokomotiv Plovdiv, signing a two-year contract. On 18 February, he made his league debut for Lokomotiv, coming on as a substitute for Asen Georgiev against Pirin Blagoevgrad. On 16 April 2019, Eze scored his first goal for Lokomotiv in a Bulgarian Cup match against Septemvri Sofia, which Lokomotiv won 4–0.

=== Tobol ===
On 21 January 2020, Eze joined Kazakhstan Premier League club FC Tobol. An injury sustained in a pre-season friendly match meant he never got to feature in an official game for the team, as he had to undergo an operation in Turkey. Eze parted ways with Tobol in July 2020.

=== Jamshedpur FC ===
On 10 September 2020, Eze joined Indian Super League side Jamshedpur. After his one year contract was completed, on 1 July 2021, Eze left Jamshedpur FC and became a free agent.

=== NK Solin ===
On 17 February 2022, Eze joined Croatian First League club NK Solin. He made his debut coming off the bench in a 3-0 loss against NK Dugopolje.

=== Queen's Park ===
After a year with Croatian club NK Solin, Eze signed for Scottish club Queen's Park in August 2022. In June 2023, Stephen Eze departed the club by mutual consent

=== Return to Jamshedpur FC ===
After leaving Quang Nam FC, Eze re-joined Jamshedpur. On 17 January 2025, Eze scored a stunning equalizer against Mohun Bagan SG. Picking up a pass from inside his own half, he dribbled past multiple Mohun Bagan Super Giant players, entered the penalty area, dribbled past three Mohun Bagan defenders, before finding the bottom right corner. The goal was nominated by the ISL for the Fan's Goal of the Week award as well.

== International career ==
Eze was invited to play for the Nigeria national team. He was named in the Super Eagles' 23-man A' team which played in the Caf CHAN 2016, led by coach Sunday Oliseh. Eze played all the group games, but the team was eliminated in the first round. His performances led to an invitation to the full Nigeria team. He was also in the A' team in the 2018 African Nations Championship where results improved, Nigeria progressing to the final before losing to the hosts Morocco.

In May 2018 he was named in the preliminary 30-man squad for the 2018 World Cup in Russia; however, he did not make the final 23.

== Career statistics ==
=== Club ===
As of 22 September 2019

Club	League	Season	League		Cup		Continental		Other		Total	
Club	League	Season	Apps	Goals	Apps	Goals	Apps	Goals	Apps	Goals	Apps	Goals
Lokomotiv Plovdiv	First League	2017–18	13	0	0	0	—		—		13	0
Lokomotiv Plovdiv	First League	2018–19	25	0	6	1	—		—		31	1
Lokomotiv Plovdiv	First League	2019–20	10	1	0	0	4	0	1 (Note: 2019 Bulgarian Supercup)	0	15	1
Career statistics			48	1	6	1	4	0	1	0	59	2

== Honours ==
Ifeanyi Ubah

- Nigeria Super Cup: 2017

Lokomotiv Plovdiv

- Bulgarian Cup: 2018–19
