= Akram El Hadi Salim =

Sudanese international footballer

Akram Alhadi
Personal information
- Full name: Akram Alhadi Saleem Abdeltam
- Date of birth: 27 February 1987 (age 39)
- Place of birth: Abu Dhabi, United Arab Emirates
- Height: 1.86 m (6 ft 1 in)
- Position: Goalkeeper

Team information
- Current team: Al-Amir SC (Dongola)
- Number: 16

Senior career*
Years	Team	Apps	(Gls)
2004	Al-Rabea Club (Omdurman)		(0)
2005	Abu Anja SC (Omdurman)		(0)
2005–2006	Al-Hilal Club	0	(0)
2007	Abu Anja SC (Omdurman)		(0)
2008–2011	Al-Merrikh SC		(0)
2011	Al Khartoum SC		(0)
2012–2014	Al-Merrikh SC		(0)
2014	Al Ahli SC (Khartoum) (loan)		(0)
2015–2016	Al Ahli SC (Khartoum)		(0)
2017	Al Khartoum SC		(0)
2017–2018	Al-Hilal SC (Al-Ubayyid)		(0)
2018	Kober SC (Bahri)		(4)
2018-2019	Al Rabita Kosti		(0)
2019-2021	Alamal SC Atbara		
2021	Tuti SC		
2021-2022	Al-Merrikh SC		
2022-2023	Hay Al-Arab SC		
2023-2024	Al-Naser (Omdurman)		
2024	Hay Al-Wadi SC		
2024-2025	Al-Hilal SC (Al-Managel)		
2025-2026	Al Rabita Kosti		
2026-	Al-Amir SC (Dongola)		

International career^{‡}
2007–	Sudan	40	(0)
Medal record
Men's football
Representing Sudan
African Nations Championship
Third place	2018 Morocco
CECAFA Cup
Winner	2007 Tanzania
- * Club domestic league appearances and goals as of 22 October 2026 ‡ National team caps and goals as of 9 October 2020

Akram El Hadi Saleem (born 27 February 1987) is a Sudanese professional footballer who plays as a goalkeeper for Al-Wadi SC (Nyala). He was the starting goalkeeper for the Sudan at the 2012 Africa Cup of Nations, taking part in three matches.

== Honours ==
Al-Hilal

- Sudan Premier League: 2005, 2006

Al-Merrikh SC

- Sudan Premier League: 2008, 2013
- Sudan Cup: 2008, 2012, 2013

Sudan

- African Nations Championship: 3rd place, 2018
- CECAFA Cup: 2007
