= 2018 African Nations Championship =

5th edition of CHAN

2018 بطولة امم افريقيا

Tournament details
- Host country: Morocco
- Dates: 13 January – 4 February
- Teams: 16 (from 1 confederation)
- Venues: 4 (in 4 host cities)

Final positions
- Champions: Morocco (1st title)
- Runners-up: Nigeria
- Third place: Sudan
- Fourth place: Libya

Tournament statistics
- Matches played: 32
- Goals scored: 58 (1.81 per match)
- Top scorer: Ayoub El Kaabi (9 goals)
- Best player: Ayoub El Kaabi
- Fair play award: Morocco

The 2018 African Nations Championship, known as the 2018 CHAN for short and for sponsorship purposes as the Total African Nations Championship, was the 5th edition of the biennial association football tournament organized by the Confederation of African Football (CAF) featuring players from their respective national leagues. Originally supposed to be hosted in Kenya, it was instead hosted by Morocco from 13 January to 4 February 2018.

The 2016 finalists, DR Congo and Mali, failed to qualify for this edition following their qualification losses, Mali losing 3–2 to Mauritania on aggregate and DR Congo losing to the neighbouring Congo via the away goals rule. Hosts Morocco defeated Nigeria 4–0 in the final to win their first title which made Morocco the first team to win the tournament on home soil.

== Host selection ==
Following the conclusion of the final of the previous edition in Rwanda on 7 February 2016, CAF announced Kenya as the host nation of the next edition 48 hours later. However, CAF decided to change the host nation on 23 September the following year due to a lack of progress with preparations and open up a new tender process for a replacement team with the deadline of 30 September 2017. The countries who submitted to replace Kenya as hosts are:

- Equatorial Guinea
- Ethiopia
- Morocco (selected as hosts)

The Ethiopian Football Federation did not provide the government's letter of guarantee and were not considered; the CAF Emergency Committee decided on 15 October that year to choose Morocco over Equatorial Guinea.

== Qualification ==
The qualification rounds took place from 20 April to 20 August 2017.

Since Morocco had already qualified in the Northern Zone before replacing Kenya as hosts, their spot in the main phase was re-allocated to their opponents in the Northern Zone final qualifying round, Egypt. However, Egypt declined to participate citing a "congested domestic calendar". As a result, the spot was reverted to Central-East Zone (as originally three teams would participate including original-turned-stripped hosts Kenya), and would go to the winner of a play-off in November 2017 between Ethiopia and Rwanda, the two teams which lost in the Central-East Zone final qualifying round.

== Qualified teams ==
The following teams qualified for the group stage of this edition of the tournament:

| Team | Zone | Appearance | Previous best performance | FIFA ranking at start of event |
|---|---|---|---|---|
| Cameroon | Central Zone | 3rd | Quarter-finals (2011, 2016) | 45 |
| Congo | Central Zone | 2nd | Group stage (2014) | 96 |
| Equatorial Guinea | Central Zone | 1st | Debut | 146 |
| Rwanda | Central-East Zone | 3rd | Quarter-finals (2016) | 113 |
| Sudan | Central-East Zone | 2nd | Third place (2011) | 136 |
| Uganda | Central-East Zone | 4th | Group stage (2011, 2014, 2016) | 75 |
| Libya | North Zone | 3rd | Champions (2014) | 88 |
| Morocco (hosts) | North Zone | 3rd | Quarter-finals (2014) | 40 |
| Angola | South Zone | 3rd | Runners-up (2011) | 141 |
| Namibia | South Zone | 1st | Debut | 118 |
| Zambia | South Zone | 3rd | Third place (2009) | 74 |
| Guinea | West A Zone | 2nd | Fourth place (2016) | 65 |
| Mauritania | West A Zone | 2nd | Group stage (2014) | 99 |
| Burkina Faso | West B Zone | 2nd | Group stage (2014) | 44 |
| Ivory Coast | West B Zone | 4th | Third place (2016) | 61 |
| Nigeria | West B Zone | 3rd | Third place (2014) | 51 |

== Venues ==
This edition of the tournament had matches held in Casablanca, Marrakesh, Agadir and Tangier.

| Casablanca | 2018 African Nations Championship is located in Morocco | Marrakesh |
|---|---|---|
| Stade Mohamed V | 2018 African Nations Championship is located in Morocco | Stade de Marrakech |
| Capacity: 45,600 | 2018 African Nations Championship is located in Morocco | Capacity: 45,240 |
| Tangier | 2018 African Nations Championship is located in Morocco | Agadir |
| Ibn Batouta Stadium | 2018 African Nations Championship is located in Morocco | Stade Adrar |
| Capacity: 45,000 | 2018 African Nations Championship is located in Morocco | Capacity: 45,480 |

Before Kenya was stripped of its hosting rights, its football association planned to use 4 stadiums for this edition of the tournament. However, only Nyayo National Stadium in Nairobi and Kasarani Stadium in Kasarani were considered to meet hosting requirements after inspections by CAF, while Mombasa Municipal Stadium in Mombasa and Kinoru Stadium in Meru did not.

== Squads ==
The squads of the participating teams each consisting of 23 players per the tournament's regulation article 72 were announced by CAF on 10 January 2018.

== Match officials ==
A total of 32 match officials (16 referees and 16 assistant referees) were selected for this edition of the tournament, of which 7 were selected to operate the video assistant referee (VAR) system in a CAF competition for the first time ever, beginning at the knockout stages.

== Draw ==
The draw for the group stage was held at Sofitel Rabat in the Moroccan capital, Rabat, on 17 November 2017 at 19:30 WET (UTC±0).

The teams were drawn into 4 groups of 4. The hosts Morocco were seeded in Group A. The remaining teams were seeded based on their results in the four most recent editions of the tournament: 2009 (multiplied by 1), 2011 (multiplied by 2), 2014 (multiplied by 3), 2016 (multiplied by 4):

- 7 points for winner
- 5 points for runner-up
- 3 points for semi-finalists
- 2 points for quarter-finalists
- 1 point for group stage

Based on the formula above, the 4 pots were allocated as follows:

| Pot 1 | Pot 2 | Pot 3 | Pot 4 |
|---|---|---|---|
| 1. Morocco (hosts) (10 pts); 2. Libya (22 pts); 3. Ivory Coast (15 pts); 4. Angola (14 pts) | 5. Nigeria (13 pts); 6. Guinea (12 pts); 7. Cameroon (12 pts); 8. Zambia (11 pts) | 9. Rwanda (10 pts); 10. Uganda (9 pts); 11. Sudan (6 pts); 12. Congo (3 pts) | 13. Burkina Faso (3 pts); 14. Mauritania (3 pts); 15. Namibia (0 pts); 16. Equatorial Guinea (0 pts) |

== Group stage ==
The top two teams of each group advanced to the knockout stage.

Tiebreakers

Teams were ranked according to points (3 points for a win, 1 point for a draw, 0 points for a loss), and if tied on points, the following tiebreaking criteria were applied, in the order given, to determine the rankings (Regulations Article 74):

1. Points in head-to-head matches among tied teams;
2. Goal difference in head-to-head matches among tied teams;
3. Goals scored in head-to-head matches among tied teams;
4. If more than two teams were tied, and after applying all head-to-head criteria above, a subset of teams wrre still tied, all head-to-head criteria above were reapplied exclusively to this subset of teams;
5. Goal difference in all group matches;
6. Goals scored in all group matches;
7. Drawing of lots.

All times are local, WET (UTC±0).

=== Group A ===
| Pos | Team | Pld | W | D | L | GF | GA | GD | Pts | Qualification |
|---|---|---|---|---|---|---|---|---|---|---|
| 1 | Morocco (H) | 3 | 2 | 1 | 0 | 7 | 1 | +6 | 7 | Knockout stage |
| 2 | Sudan | 3 | 2 | 1 | 0 | 3 | 1 | +2 | 7 | Knockout stage |
| 3 | Guinea | 3 | 1 | 0 | 2 | 3 | 5 | −2 | 3 | |
| 4 | Mauritania | 3 | 0 | 0 | 3 | 0 | 6 | −6 | 0 | |

Source: CAF (archived)
Rules for classification: Group stage tiebreakers
(H) Hosts
13 January 2018
19:30

| Morocco | 4–0 | Mauritania |
|---|---|---|
| El Kaabi 66', 79'; Haddad 71'; Bencharki 90+2' | Report |

Stade Mohamed V, Casablanca
Referee: Janny Sikazwe (Zambia)
14 January 2018
14:30

| Guinea | 1–2 | Sudan |
|---|---|---|
| Sékou Camara 55' | Report | Koko 19'; Teiri 75' |

Stade Mohamed V, Casablanca
Referee: Hélder Martins de Carvalho (Angola)

17 January 2018
16:30

| Morocco | 3–1 | Guinea |
|---|---|---|
| El Kaabi 27', 65', 68' | Report | Saïdouba Camara 29' |

Stade Mohamed V, Casablanca
Referee: Abou Coulibaly (Ivory Coast)
17 January 2018
19:30

| Sudan | 1–0 | Mauritania |
|---|---|---|
| W.E. Musa 30' | Report |

Stade Mohamed V, Casablanca
Referee: Sadok Selmi (Tunisia)

21 January 2018
19:00

| Sudan | 0–0 | Morocco |
|---|---|---|
| | Report |

Stade Mohamed V, Casablanca
Referee: Jean-Jacques Ndala (DR Congo)
21 January 2018
19:00

| Mauritania | 0–1 | Guinea |
|---|---|---|
| | Report | Sankhon 15' |

Stade de Marrakech, Marrakesh
Referee: Jackson Pavaza (Namibia)

=== Group B ===
| Pos | Team | Pld | W | D | L | GF | GA | GD | Pts | Qualification |
|---|---|---|---|---|---|---|---|---|---|---|
| 1 | Zambia | 3 | 2 | 1 | 0 | 6 | 2 | +4 | 7 | Knockout stage |
| 2 | Namibia | 3 | 2 | 1 | 0 | 3 | 1 | +2 | 7 | Knockout stage |
| 3 | Uganda | 3 | 0 | 1 | 2 | 1 | 4 | −3 | 1 | |
| 4 | Ivory Coast | 3 | 0 | 1 | 2 | 0 | 3 | −3 | 1 | |

Source: CAF (archived)
Rules for classification: Group stage tiebreakers
14 January 2018
16:30

| Ivory Coast | 0–1 | Namibia |
|---|---|---|
| | Report | Hambira 90' |

Stade de Marrakech, Marrakesh
Referee: Noureddine El Jaafari (Morocco)
14 January 2018
19:30

| Zambia | 3–1 | Uganda |
|---|---|---|
| Kambole 38'; Mulenga 63'; Kapumbu 71' | Report | Nsibambi 40' |

Stade de Marrakech, Marrakesh
Referee: Mehdi Abid Charef (Algeria)

18 January 2018
16:30

| Ivory Coast | 0–2 | Zambia |
|---|---|---|
| | Report | Mulenga 8', 74' |

Stade de Marrakech, Marrakesh
Referee: Hamada Nampiandraza (Madagascar)
18 January 2018
19:30

| Uganda | 0–1 | Namibia |
|---|---|---|
| | Report | Nekundi 90+2' |

Stade de Marrakech, Marrakesh
Referee: Ibrahim Nour El Din (Egypt)

22 January 2018
19:00

| Uganda | 0–0 | Ivory Coast |
|---|---|---|
| | Report |

Stade de Marrakech, Marrakesh
Referee: Hélder Martins de Carvalho (Angola)
22 January 2018
19:00

| Namibia | 1–1 | Zambia |
|---|---|---|
| Iimbondi 13' | Report | Kambole 24' |

Stade Mohamed V, Casablanca
Referee: Louis Hakizimana (Rwanda)

=== Group C ===
| Pos | Team | Pld | W | D | L | GF | GA | GD | Pts | Qualification |
|---|---|---|---|---|---|---|---|---|---|---|
| 1 | Nigeria | 3 | 2 | 1 | 0 | 4 | 1 | +3 | 7 | Knockout stage |
| 2 | Libya | 3 | 2 | 0 | 1 | 4 | 1 | +3 | 6 | Knockout stage |
| 3 | Rwanda | 3 | 1 | 1 | 1 | 1 | 1 | 0 | 4 | |
| 4 | Equatorial Guinea | 3 | 0 | 0 | 3 | 1 | 7 | −6 | 0 | |

Source: CAF
Rules for classification: Group stage tiebreakers
15 January 2018
16:30

| Libya | 3–0 | Equatorial Guinea |
|---|---|---|
| Al Taher 11', 16'; Alharaish 86' | Report |

Stade Ibn Batouta, Tangier
Referee: Mahamadou Keita (Mali)
15 January 2018
19:30

| Nigeria | 0–0 | Rwanda |
|---|---|---|
| | Report |

Stade Ibn Batouta, Tangier
Referee: Victor Gomes (South Africa)

19 January 2018
16:30

| Libya | 0–1 | Nigeria |
|---|---|---|
| | Report | Faleye 79' |

Stade Ibn Batouta, Tangier
Referee: Mustapha Ghorbal (Algeria)
19 January 2018
19:30

| Rwanda | 1–0 | Equatorial Guinea |
|---|---|---|
| Manzi 66' | Report |

Stade Ibn Batouta, Tangier
Referee: Daniel Laryea (Ghana)

23 January 2018
19:00

| Rwanda | 0–1 | Libya |
|---|---|---|
| | Report | Abushnaf 90+2' |

Stade Ibn Batouta, Tangier
Referee: Noureddine El Jaafari (Morocco)
23 January 2018
19:00

| Equatorial Guinea | 1–3 | Nigeria |
|---|---|---|
| Amor 40' | Report | Okpotu 60'; Ojo 69'; Ali 84' (pen.) |

Stade Adrar, Agadir
Referee: Abou Coulibaly (Ivory Coast)

=== Group D ===
| Pos | Team | Pld | W | D | L | GF | GA | GD | Pts | Qualification |
|---|---|---|---|---|---|---|---|---|---|---|
| 1 | Congo | 3 | 2 | 1 | 0 | 3 | 0 | +3 | 7 | Knockout stage |
| 2 | Angola | 3 | 1 | 2 | 0 | 1 | 0 | +1 | 5 | Knockout stage |
| 3 | Burkina Faso | 3 | 0 | 2 | 1 | 1 | 3 | −2 | 2 | |
| 4 | Cameroon | 3 | 0 | 1 | 2 | 1 | 3 | −2 | 1 | |

Source: CAF (archived)
Rules for classification: Group stage tiebreakers
16 January 2018
16:30

| Angola | 0–0 | Burkina Faso |
|---|---|---|
| | Report |

Stade Adrar, Agadir
Referee: Bamlak Tessema Weyesa (Ethiopia)
16 January 2018
19:30

| Cameroon | 0–1 | Congo |
|---|---|---|
| | Report | Makiesse 72' (pen.) |

Stade Adrar, Agadir
Referee: Gehad Grisha (Egypt)

20 January 2018
16:30

| Angola | 1–0 | Cameroon |
|---|---|---|
| Job 30' (pen.) | Report |

Stade Adrar, Agadir
Referee: Maguette N'Diaye (Senegal)
20 January 2018
19:30

| Congo | 2–0 | Burkina Faso |
|---|---|---|
| C. Bakoua 67'; Bidimbou 90+2' | Report |

Stade Adrar, Agadir
Referee: Pacifique Ndabihawenimana (Burundi)

24 January 2018
19:00

| Congo | 0–0 | Angola |
|---|---|---|
| | Report |

Stade Adrar, Agadir
Referee: Mustapha Ghorbal (Algeria)
24 January 2018
19:00

| Burkina Faso | 1–1 | Cameroon |
|---|---|---|
| Sylla 42' | Report | P. Moussombo 52' |

Stade Ibn Batouta, Tangier
Referee: Victor Gomes (South Africa)

== Knockout stage ==
From this stage onward, the video assistant referee (VAR) system made its debut in a CAF competition. Extra time and a penalty shoot-out were used if necessary to decide the winner, except for the third-place match, where a penalty shoot-out but no extra time was used if necessary to decide the winner, per the competition's regulations article 75.

=== Bracket ===
Quarter-finals
27 January – Casablanca
Morocco | 2
Namibia | 0
28 January – Agadir
Congo | 1 (3)
Libya (p) | 1 (5)
27 January – Marrakesh
Zambia | 0
Sudan | 1
28 January – Tangier
Nigeria (a.e.t.) | 2
Angola | 1

Semi-finals
31 January – Casablanca
Morocco (a.e.t.) | 3
Libya | 1
31 January – Marrakesh
Sudan | 0
Nigeria | 1

Final
4 February – Casablanca
Morocco | 4
Nigeria | 0
Third place
3 February – Marrakesh
Libya | 1 (2)
Sudan (p) | 1 (4)

=== Quarter-finals ===
27 January 2018
16:30

| Morocco | 2–0 | Namibia |
|---|---|---|
| El Kaabi 36'; Saidi 54' | Report |

Stade Mohamed V, Casablanca
Referee: Mahamadou Keita (Mali)

27 January 2018
19:30

| Zambia | 0–1 | Sudan |
|---|---|---|
| | Report | Teiri 32' |

Stade de Marrakech, Marrakesh
Referee: Bamlak Tessema Weyesa (Ethiopia)

28 January 2018
16:30

| Nigeria | 2–1 (a.e.t.) | Angola |
|---|---|---|
| Okpotu 90+2'; Okechukwu 109' | Report | Vá 56' |

Stade Ibn Batouta, Tangier
Referee: Sadok Selmi (Tunisia)

28 January 2018
19:30

| Congo | 1–1 (a.e.t.) | Libya |
|---|---|---|
| Junior Makiesse 32' | Report | Saleh Al Taher 14' |
Penalties
| F.B. Kibamba (penalty scored); Mboungou (penalty scored); Mouko (penalty missed); Rozan (penalty scored) | 3–5 | (penalty scored) M. Taktak; (penalty scored) A. Khalleefah; (penalty scored) A. Alaqoub; (penalty scored) A. Al-Maghasi; (penalty scored) Sand Masaud |

Stade Adrar, Agadir
Referee: Hamada Nampiandraza (Madagascar)

=== Semi-finals ===
31 January 2018
16:30

| Morocco | 3–1 (a.e.t.) | Libya |
|---|---|---|
| El Kaabi 73', 97'; El Karti 119' (pen.) | Report | A. Khalleefah 86' |

Stade Mohamed V, Casablanca
Referee: Janny Sikazwe (Zambia)

31 January 2018
19:30

| Sudan | 0–1 | Nigeria |
|---|---|---|
| | Report | Okechukwu 16' |

Stade de Marrakech, Marrakesh
Referee: Malang Diedhiou (Senegal)

=== Third place match ===
3 February 2018
19:00

| Libya | 1–1 | Sudan |
|---|---|---|
| Ablo 84' | Report | Walaa Eldin 6' |
Penalties
| M. Taktak (penalty scored); M. Elhouni (penalty missed); A. Alaqoub (penalty scored); Ablo (penalty missed) | 2–4 | (penalty scored) M. El Tahir; (penalty scored) A. El Tahir; (penalty scored) Ahmed Adam Mohamed; (penalty scored) Maaz Abdelraheem |

Stade de Marrakech, Marrakesh
Referee: Mehdi Abid Charef (Algeria)

=== Final ===
4 February 2018
19:00

| Morocco | 4–0 | Nigeria |
|---|---|---|
| Hadraf 44', 64'; El Karti 61'; El Kaabi 73' | Report |

Stade Mohamed V, Casablanca
Attendance: 75,000
Referee: Bakary Gassama (Gambia)

== Goalscorers ==
9 goals

- (Morocco) Ayoub El Kaabi

3 goals

- (Libya) Saleh Al Taher
- (Zambia) Augustine Mulenga

2 goals

- (Morocco) Walid El Karti
- (Morocco) Zakaria Hadraf
- (Republic of the Congo) Junior Makiesse
- (Nigeria) Gabriel Okechukwu
- (Nigeria) Anthony Okpotu
- (Sudan) Walaa Eldin Musa
- (Sudan) Seif Teiri
- (Zambia) Lazarous Kambole

1 goal

- (Angola) Job
- (Angola) Vá
- (Burkina Faso) Mohamed Sydney Sylla
- (Cameroon) Patrick Moussombo
- (Republic of the Congo) Carof Bakoua
- (Republic of the Congo) Kader Bidimbou
- (Equatorial Guinea) Amor
- (Guinea) Saïdouba Bissiri Camara
- (Guinea) Sékou Amadou Camara
- (Guinea) Ibrahima Sory Sankhon
- (Libya) Salem Ablo
- (Libya) Elmutasem Abushnaf
- (Libya) Zakaria Alharaish
- (Libya) Abdulrahman Khalleefah
- (Morocco) Achraf Bencharki
- (Morocco) Ismail Haddad
- (Morocco) Salaheddine Saidi
- (Namibia) Vetunuavi Hambira
- (Namibia) Absalom Iimbondi
- (Namibia) Panduleni Nekundi
- (Nigeria) Rabiu Ali
- (Nigeria) Sunday Faleye
- (Nigeria) Dayo Ojo
- (Rwanda) Thierry Manzi
- (Sudan) Omer Suleiman
- (Uganda) Derrick Nsibambi
- (Zambia) Fackson Kapumbu

== Awards ==
The following awards were given at the conclusion of the tournament:

Total Man of the Competition
(Morocco) Ayoub El Kaabi
Top Scorer
Ayoub El Kaabi (9 goals)
CAF Fair Play Team
Morocco

=== Team of the Tournament ===
| Goalkeeper | Defenders | Midfielders | Forwards |
|---|---|---|---|
| (Sudan) Akram El Hadi | Omer Suliman; Stephen Eze; Badr Benoun | Dayo Ojo; Walid El Karti; Salaheddine Saidi; (Morocco) Zakaria Hadraf; (Libya) Abdulrahman Ramadhan | (Morocco) Ayoub El Kaabi; (Libya) Saleh Taher |

Substitutes: Anas Zniti (Morocco), Sand Masaud (Libya), Vá (Angola), Bader Hasan (Libya), Augustine Mulenga (Zambia), Saifeldin Bakhit (Sudan), Ismail El Haddad (Morocco)

=== Man of the match ===
| Stage | Team 1 | Result | Team 2 | Man of the Match |
First round of group stage matches
| Group A | Morocco | 4–0 | Mauritania | (Morocco) Abdelilah Hafidi |
| Group A | Guinea | 1–2 | Sudan | (Sudan) Saifeldin Malik Bakhit |
| Group B | Ivory Coast | 0–1 | Namibia | (Namibia) Vetunuavi Hambira |
| Group B | Zambia | 3–1 | Uganda | (Zambia) Lazarous Kambole |
| Group C | Libya | 3–0 | Equatorial Guinea | (Libya) Saleh Al Taher |
| Group C | Nigeria | 0–0 | Rwanda | (Rwanda) Djihad Bizimana |
| Group D | Angola | 0–0 | Burkina Faso | (Angola) Vá |
| Group D | Cameroon | 0–1 | Congo | (Republic of the Congo) Prestige Mboungou |
| Group A | Morocco | 3–1 | Guinea | (Morocco) Ayoub El Kaabi |
| Group A | Sudan | 1–0 | Mauritania | (Sudan) Omer Suleiman Koko |
| Group B | Ivory Coast | 0–2 | Zambia | (Zambia) Augustine Mulenga |
| Group B | Uganda | 0–1 | Namibia | (Namibia) Lloyd Kazapua |
| Group C | Libya | 0–1 | Nigeria | (Nigeria) Stephen Eze |
| Group C | Rwanda | 1–0 | Equatorial Guinea | (Rwanda) Thierry Manzi |
| Group D | Angola | 1–0 | Cameroon | (Angola) Vá |
| Group D | Congo | 2–0 | Burkina Faso | (Republic of the Congo) Junior Makiesse |
| Group A | Sudan | 0–0 | Morocco | (Sudan) Akram El Hadi Salim |
| Group A | Mauritania | 0–1 | Guinea | (Guinea) Ibrahima Sory Sankhon |
| Group B | Uganda | 0–0 | Ivory Coast | (Ivory Coast) Kouamé N'Guessan |
| Group B | Namibia | 1–1 | Zambia | (Namibia) Teberius Lombard |
| Group C | Rwanda | 0–1 | Libya | (Libya) Elmutasem Abushnaf |
| Group C | Equatorial Guinea | 1–3 | Nigeria | (Nigeria) Dayo Ojo |
| Group D | Congo | 0–0 | Angola | (Republic of the Congo) Francoeur Baron Kibamba |
| Group D | Burkina Faso | 1–1 | Cameroon | (Burkina Faso) Wend-Panga Bambara |
Knockout stage matches
| Quarter-finals | Morocco | 2–0 | Namibia | (Morocco) Salaheddine Saidi |
| Quarter-finals | Zambia | 0–1 | Sudan | (Sudan) Mohamed Hashim |
| Quarter-finals | Nigeria | 2–1 (a.e.t.) | Angola | (Nigeria) Ikechukwu Ezenwa |
| Quarter-finals | Congo | 1–1 (a.e.t.) (3–5 p) | Libya | (Libya) Abdulrahman Khalleefah |
| Semi-finals | Morocco | 3–1 (a.e.t.) | Libya | (Morocco) Ayoub El Kaabi |
| Semi-finals | Sudan | 0–1 | Nigeria | (Nigeria) Gabriel Okechukwu |
| Third place match | Libya | 1–1 (2–4 p) | Sudan | (Sudan) Muhannad El Tahir |
| Final | Morocco | 4–0 | Nigeria | (Morocco) Zakaria Hadraf |

=== Tournament team rankings ===
As per statistical convention in football, matches decided in extra time are counted as wins and losses while matches decided by penalty shoot-outs are counted as draws.

| Pos | Team | Pld | W | D | L | GF | GA | GD | Pts | Final result |
|---|---|---|---|---|---|---|---|---|---|---|
| 1 | Morocco (H) | 6 | 5 | 1 | 0 | 16 | 2 | +14 | 16 | Champions |
| 2 | Nigeria | 6 | 4 | 1 | 1 | 7 | 6 | +1 | 13 | Runners-up |
| 3 | Sudan | 6 | 3 | 2 | 1 | 5 | 3 | +2 | 11 | Third place |
| 4 | Libya | 6 | 2 | 2 | 2 | 7 | 6 | +1 | 8 | Fourth place |
| 5 | Congo | 4 | 2 | 2 | 0 | 4 | 1 | +3 | 8 | Eliminated at the quarter-finals |
| 6 | Zambia | 4 | 2 | 1 | 1 | 6 | 3 | +3 | 7 | Eliminated at the quarter-finals |
| 7 | Namibia | 4 | 2 | 1 | 1 | 3 | 3 | 0 | 7 | Eliminated at the quarter-finals |
| 8 | Angola | 4 | 1 | 2 | 1 | 2 | 2 | 0 | 5 | Eliminated at the quarter-finals |
| 9 | Rwanda | 3 | 1 | 1 | 1 | 1 | 1 | 0 | 4 | Eliminated at the group stage |
| 10 | Guinea | 3 | 1 | 0 | 2 | 3 | 5 | −2 | 3 | Eliminated at the group stage |
| 11 | Burkina Faso | 3 | 0 | 2 | 1 | 1 | 3 | −2 | 2 | Eliminated at the group stage |
| 12 | Cameroon | 3 | 0 | 1 | 2 | 1 | 3 | −2 | 1 | Eliminated at the group stage |
| 13 | Uganda | 3 | 0 | 1 | 2 | 1 | 4 | −3 | 1 | Eliminated at the group stage |
| 14 | Ivory Coast | 3 | 0 | 1 | 2 | 0 | 3 | −3 | 1 | Eliminated at the group stage |
| 15 | Equatorial Guinea | 3 | 0 | 0 | 3 | 1 | 7 | −6 | 0 | Eliminated at the group stage |
| 16 | Mauritania | 3 | 0 | 0 | 3 | 0 | 6 | −6 | 0 | Eliminated at the group stage |

(H) Hosts
