= DR Congo A' national football team =

National team for in-DR Congo players

DR Congo A'
- Nickname: The Leopards
- Association: Congolese Association Football Federation
- Confederation: CAF (Africa)
- Sub-confederation: UNIFFAC (Central Africa)
- Head coach: Christian Nsengi-Biembe
- Home stadium: Stade des Martyrs
- FIFA code: COD
First colours	Second colours

African Nations Championship
- Appearances: 5 (first in 2009)
- Best result: Champions, 2009 and 2016

The DR Congo A' national team is the local national football team of the DR Congo (formerly Zaire, alternatively known as Congo-Kinshasa) and is open only to domestic league players. The team represents DR Congo at the African Nations Championship and is governed by the Congolese Association Football Federation. They are nicknamed The Leopards.

DR Congo won the maiden African Nations Championship hosted by Ivory Coast in 2009 and repeated the feat at the 2016 tournament. Since 2014, all DR Congo A' team matches have been recognized by FIFA as first team matches.

== African Nations Championship record ==
African Nations Championship
Appearances: 5
Year	Round	Position	Pld	W	D*	L	GF	GA
(Ivory Coast) 2009	Champions	1st	5	3	1	1	7	5
(Sudan) 2011	Quarter-finals	8th	4	1	1	2	3	5
(South Africa) 2014	Quarter-finals	7th	4	2	0	2	3	3
(Rwanda) 2016	Champions	1st	6	4	1	1	14	7
(Morocco) 2018	Did not qualify							
(Cameroon) 2020	Quarter- finals	5th	4	2	1	1	5	4
(Algeria) 2022	Group stage	15	3	0	2	1	0	3
(Kenya) (Tanzania) (Uganda); 2024	To be Determined							
Total	Champions	5/7	23	12	4	7	32	24

== Results and fixtures ==
=== Results ===
22 September 2019 2020 African Nations Championship	Central African Republic	0–2	DR Congo	Barthélemy Boganda Stadium, Bangui
16:00 (UTC+1)		Report	Beya 26'; Muleka 85'	Referee: Diosdado Nzibi Nze Angono (Equatorial Guinea)

20 October 2019 2020 African Nations Championship	DR Congo	4–1	Central African Republic	Stade des Martyrs, Kinshasa
15:30 (UTC+1)	Beya 13', 42'; Kikasa 28'; Muleka 60'	Report	Dimokoyen 70'	Referee: Antoine Effa Essouma (Cameroon)

=== Fixtures ===
Pos	Team	Pld	W	D	L	GF	GA	GD	Pts	Qualification
1	Libya	0	0	0	0	0	0	0	0	Knockout stage
2	DR Congo	0	0	0	0	0	0	0	0	Knockout stage
3	Congo	0	0	0	0	0	0	0	0	
4	Niger	0	0	0	0	0	0	0	0	

First match(es) will be played: January 2021. Source: CAF
Rules for classification: Group stage tiebreakers
January 2021

DR Congo	TBD	Congo

Japoma Stadium, Douala
January 2021

Libya	TBD	DR Congo

Japoma Stadium, Douala
January 2021

Niger	TBD	DR Congo

Stade Ahmadou Ahidjo, Yaoundé

== Squad ==
The following players were called up for the 2020 African Nations Championship matches against Central African Republic.
Caps and goals as of 20 October 2019 after the match against Central African Republic.

No.	Pos.	Player	Date of birth (age)	Caps	Goals	Club
	GK	Jackson Lunanga Sankiaro	5 May 1997 (age 29)	2	0	(Congolese Association Football Federation) AS Vita
	GK	Nathan Mabruki	27 April 1989 (age 37)	3	0	(Congolese Association Football Federation) DC Motema Pembe
	DF	Mukoko Amale	17 October 1998 (age 28)	5	0	(Congolese Association Football Federation) DC Motema Pembe
	DF	Issama Mpeko	30 May 1989 (age 37)	71	1	(Congolese Association Football Federation) TP Mazembe
	DF	Ernest Luzolo Sita	24 January 1997 (age 29)	3	0	(Congolese Association Football Federation) AS Vita
	DF	Kévin Mondeko	10 September 1995 (age 31)	2	0	(Congolese Association Football Federation) TP Mazembe
	DF	Luete Ava Dongo	27 January 1996 (age 30)	5	1	(Congolese Association Football Federation) AS Vita
	DF	Atibu Radjabu		0	0	(Congolese Association Football Federation) AS Maniema Union
	MF	Teji Lutonadio		2	0	(Congolese Association Football Federation) AS Maniema Union
	MF	Rachidi Assumani	25 February 1994 (age 32)	0	0	(Congolese Association Football Federation) DC Motema Pembe
	MF	Steve Ebuela		0	0	(Congolese Association Football Federation) AS Dauphins Noirs
	MF	Glody Likonza	10 May 1998 (age 28)	2	0	(Congolese Association Football Federation) TP Mazembe
	MF	Zemanga Soze		0	0	(Congolese Association Football Federation) AS Vita
	MF	Mukoko Tonombe	16 January 1996 (age 30)	2	0	(Congolese Association Football Federation) AS Vita
	MF	Beverly Makangila	11 April 2000 (age 26)	1	0	(Congolese Association Football Federation) FC Saint-Éloi Lupopo
	MF	Jérémie Mumbere	10 June 1991 (age 35)	2	0	(Congolese Association Football Federation) AS Vita
	MF	Ikoyo Iyembe		1	0	(Congolese Association Football Federation) DC Motema Pembe
	FW	Vinny Kmobe Bongonga	24 March 1996 (age 30)	0	0	(Congolese Association Football Federation) DC Motema Pembe
	FW	Ducapel Moloko	25 December 1997 (age 28)	0	0	(Congolese Association Football Federation) AS Vita
	FW	Jackson Muleka	4 October 1999 (age 27)	7	3	(Congolese Association Football Federation) TP Mazembe
	FW	Isaac Tshibangu	17 May 2003 (age 23)	2	0	(Congolese Association Football Federation) TP Mazembe
	FW	Merveille Wamba Kikasa	14 February 1999 (age 27)	3	1	(Congolese Association Football Federation) AS Vita
	FW	Chico Ushindi Was Kubanza	7 January 1996 (age 30)	2	0	(Congolese Association Football Federation) Unknown
	FW	Joël Beya	8 December 1999 (age 26)	3	4	(Congolese Association Football Federation) TP Mazembe

=== Previous squads ===
African Nations Championship squads

- CHAN 2011 squad
- CHAN 2016 squad

== Honours ==
African Nations Championship:

- Champions: 2009, 2016
