= Amor (footballer) =

Equatoguinean footballer

Personal information
- Full name: Secundino Salvador Eyama Nsi Eyanga
- Date of birth: 14 February 2000 (age 26)
- Place of birth: Malabo, Equatorial Guinea
- Position: Forward

Team information
- Current team: Valdepeñas

Youth career
- 2014–2018: Cano Sport
- 2018–2019: Manzanares

Senior career*
Years	Team	Apps	(Gls)
2017–2018	Cano Sport		
2019–2020	Manzanares	24	(6)
2020–2021	Atlético Tomelloso	17	(12)
2021–2022	Criptanense	33	(11)
2022–	Valdepeñas	0	(0)

International career^{‡}
2018–	Equatorial Guinea	3	(1)
- * Club domestic league appearances and goals as of 11 May 2022 ‡ National team caps and goals as of 23 January 2018

Secundino Salvador Eyama Nsi Eyanga (born 14 February 2000), sportingly known as Amor, is an Equatorial Guinean footballer who plays as a forward for Spanish club CD Valdepeñas and the Equatorial Guinea national team.

== Career statistics ==
=== International ===
As of 23 January 2018

Equatorial Guinea
Year	Apps	Goals
2018	3	1
Total	3	1

=== International goals ===
Scores and results list Equatorial Guinea's goal tally first.

No.	Date	Venue	Opponent	Score	Result	Competition
1.	23 January 2018	Stade Adrar, Agadir, Morocco	Nigeria	1–0	1–3	2018 African Nations Championship

== Personal life ==
Amor's brother, José Antonio Mba (known as Cielo), is also a footballer. He is nicknamed Amor (English: Love) because he was born on Valentine's Day.
