= Lazarous Kambole =

Zambian footballer (born 1994)

Personal information
- Date of birth: 20 January 1994 (age 32)
- Place of birth: Lusaka, Zambia
- Height: 1.70 m (5 ft 7 in)
- Position: Striker

Team information
- Current team: Young Africans

Senior career*
Years	Team	Apps	(Gls)
2011–2012	Konkola Mine Police		
2013	Konkola Blades		
2014–2019	ZESCO United	56	(39)
2019–2022	Kaizer Chiefs	33	(2)
2022–	Young Africans		
2023	→ ZESCO United (loan)		

International career^{‡}
2018–	Zambia	17	(7)
- * Club domestic league appearances and goals as of 8 July 2022 ‡ National team caps and goals as of 6 October 2020

Lazarous Kambole (born 20 January 1994) is a Zambian footballer who plays as a forward for Young Africans and the Zambia national football team.

== Career ==
=== Young Africans ===
Following his release by Kaizer Chiefs at the end of the 2021–22 season, Kambole joined Tanzanian club Young Africans, signing a two-year deal with the club. In January 2023 he was loaned to ZESCO United for the rest of the season.

=== International career ===
==== International goals ====
Scores and results list Zambia's goal tally first.

No.	Date	Venue	Opponent	Score	Result	Competition
1.	14 January 2018	Stade de Marrakech, Marrakesh, Morocco	Uganda	1–0	3–1	2018 African Nations Championship
2.	22 January 2018	Stade Mohammed V, Casablanca, Morocco	Namibia	1–1	1–1	2018 African Nations Championship
3.	21 March 2018	Levy Mwanawasa Stadium, Ndola, Zambia	Zimbabwe	2–2	2–2 (a.e.t.) (5–4 p)	2018 Four Nations Tournament
4.	6 June 2018	Peter Mokaba Stadium, Polokwane, South Africa	Madagascar	1–0	1–0	2018 COSAFA Cup
5.	9 June 2018	Peter Mokaba Stadium, Polokwane, South Africa	Zimbabwe	1–1	2–4 (a.e.t.)	2018 COSAFA Cup
6.	9 June 2018	Peter Mokaba Stadium, Polokwane, South Africa	Zimbabwe	2–1	2–4 (a.e.t.)	2018 COSAFA Cup
7.	23 March 2019	Heroes National Stadium, Lusaka, Zambia	Namibia	4–1	4–1	2019 Africa Cup of Nations qualification
