= Ebube Duru =

Nigerian footballer (born 1999)

Personal information
- Full name: Chidiebube Gideon Duru
- Date of birth: 31 July 1999 (age 27)
- Place of birth: Imo State, Nigeria
- Height: 1.79 m (5 ft 10 in)
- Position: Left-back

Team information
- Current team: Sønderjyske
- Number: 23

Youth career
- Gidi FC
- Benin Vipers

Senior career*
Years	Team	Apps	(Gls)
2011–2014	Dynamite Force	22	(4)
2014–2016	Ebedei	18	(3)
2016–2021	Lobi Stars	96	(2)
2021–2023	Rivers United	56	(8)
2024–	Sønderjyske	40	(1)

International career
2018–2019	Nigerian U23	8	(0)
2018–2022	Nigeria A'	3	(0)
- * Club domestic league appearances and goals as of 19 May 2026

Chidiebube Gideon "Ebube" Duru // (born 31 July 1999) is a Nigerian footballer who plays as a left-back for Danish Superliga side Sønderjyske.

== Career ==
Duru began his career at a grass youth club known as Rock Foundation F.C before moving to Benin Vipers, another grass youth club. On 24 January 2014, he signed for Dynamite Force F.C (amateur 2) in which he played the Nationwide League and was promoted to amateur 1 the following season. He was loaned to F.C. Ebedei, played for a season and was promoted to Pro league scoring a total of three goals. He returned to Dynamite force F.C. On 13 March 2016, Duru signed for Premier League club Lobi Stars on a three-year contract.

Ebube Duru joined Rivers United in 2021 after a four-year stint with Lobi Stars. Ebube Duru was a key player to Rivers United NPFL title win in the 2021–22 season.

Ebube Duru has been described as an extraordinary left back as he combines his defending prowess with the ability to score goals. He is also good at set plays, having scored three direct free kick goals in a season.

On September 3, 2024, it was confirmed that Duru had signed a contract with Danish Superliga side Sønderjyske until June 2027 after a successful trial period.

== International career ==
Duru represented his homeland in the 2018 Friendly against Atletico Madrid which took place at Godswill Akpabio Stadium, Uyo on May 21. And the international friendly against Liberia which took place September 11, 2018, at the Samuel Keyon Doe Sports Complex in Paynesville. On 13 February 2018, he was called up to the Nigerian under-23 national team for the 2019 Africa Cup of Nations qualifier, he made the lineup and played against Libya. He has also played for the home based team in multiple occasions.
