= 2018 Four Nations Tournament =

Tournament details
- Host country: Zambia
- Dates: 21–24 March 2018
- Teams: 4 (from 1 sub-confederation)
- Venue: 1 (in 1 host city)

Final positions
- Champions: South Africa (1st title)
- Runners-up: Zambia
- Third place: Angola
- Fourth place: Zimbabwe

Tournament statistics
- Matches played: 4
- Goals scored: 12 (3 per match)
- Top scorer(s): (Angola) Djalma (South Africa) Lebo Mothiba (Zimbabwe) Talent Chawapiwa (2 goals each)

The 2018 Four Nations Tournament is a football tournament for the national teams of Angola, South Africa, Zambia and Zimbabwe. It took place during the March 2018 window of the FIFA International Match Calendar.

A draw to determine the semi-final round matches was held on 12 March 2018.

== Matches ==
=== Semi-finals ===
21 March 2018
15:00 CAT

South Africa	1–1 (a.e.t.)	Angola
Mothiba 51'	Report	Djalma 33'
Penalties
	5–3

Levy Mwanawasa Stadium, Ndola
Attendance: 2,000
Referee: Patrick Ngoleka (Malawi)

21 March 2018
18:00 CAT

Zambia	2–2 (a.e.t.)	Zimbabwe
Shonga 64'; Kambole 90'	Report	Shamujompa 47' (o.g.); Chawapiwa 74'
Penalties
	5–4

Levy Mwanawasa Stadium, Ndola
Referee: Tirelo Mositwane (Botswana)

=== Third place play-off ===
24 March 2018
14:00 CAT

Angola	2–2 (a.e.t.)	Zimbabwe
Djalma 45+1'; Yano 90'	Report	Amidu 22'; Chawapiwa 54'
Penalties
	4–2

Levy Mwanawasa Stadium, Ndola
Attendance: 36,000
Referee: Patrick Ngoleka (Malawi)

=== Final ===
24 March 2018
18:00 CAT

Zambia	0–2	South Africa
	Report	Tau 15'; Mothiba 90+1'

Levy Mwanawasa Stadium, Ndola
Referee: Tirelo Mositwane (Botswana)

== Goalscorers ==
2 goals

- (Angola) Djalma
- (South Africa) Lebo Mothiba
- (Zimbabwe) Talent Chawapiwa

1 goal

- (Angola) Yano
- (South Africa) Percy Tau
- (Zambia) Lazarous Kambole
- (Zambia) Justin Shonga
- (Zimbabwe) Brian Amidu

Own goals

- (Zambia) Isaac Shamujompa (Against Zimbabwe)
