= Donashano Malama =

Zambian footballer (born 1991)

Personal information
- Date of birth: 1 September 1991 (age 35)
- Place of birth: Chililabombwe, Zambia
- Height: 1.80 m (5 ft 11 in)
- Position: Defender

Team information
- Current team: ZESCO United F.C.

Senior career*
| Years | Team | Apps | (Gls) |
| 2013–2018 | Nkana | | |
| 2018–2019 | Olympique Khouribga | 17 | (0) |
| 2019 | Chippa United | 6 | (1) |
| 2019–2020 | Black Leopards | 2 | (0) |
| 2020- | ZESCO United F.C. | | |

International career^{‡}
| 2013– | Zambia | 32 | (1) |
- * Club domestic league appearances and goals as of 23:24, 19 November 2019 (UTC) ‡ National team caps and goals as of 15:33, 26 July 2019 (UTC)

Donashano Malama (born 1 September 1991) is a Zambian association football defender who plays for ZESCO United F.C. and the Zambia national football team.

== Club career ==
In January 2018, Malama signed with Botola club Olympique Khouribga following the expiry of his contract at Nkana.

In January 2019, Malama moved to South African Premier Division side Chippa United F.C. signing alongside Bangaly Keita. He made his league debut for the club on 3 February 2019, coming on as a 66th-minute substitute for Repo Malepe in a 1–1 away draw with Baroka F.C.

== International career ==
Malama made his senior international debut on 28 April 2013 in a 2-0 friendly victory over Zimbabwe. He was part of the Zambia squad for the 2015 Africa Cup of Nations, and played in the final group match against Cape Verde as a substitute.

=== International goals ===
Scores and results list Zambia's goal tally first.

| No. | Date | Venue | Opponent | Score | Result | Competition |
|---|---|---|---|---|---|---|
| 1. | 23 March 2019 | Heroes National Stadium, Lusaka, Zambia | Namibia | 2–0 | 4–1 | 2019 Africa Cup of Nations qualification |
