= TEAP F.C. =

Nigerian football club

- Full name: The Everlasting Arms Parish Football Club
- Founded: 2010
- Ground: Old Parade Ground; Abuja
- Capacity: 5,000
- Owner: Redeemed Christian Church of God
- Chairman: Achebe Okoro
- Manager: Donald Malomo-Paris
- League: Nigeria National League
- Website: http://www.teapfc.com/index.html
Home colours	Away colours

TEAP FC is a Nigerian football club. They play in the second-tier division in Nigerian football, the Nigeria National League. They are one of the main clubs in Abuja. Old Parade Ground is their home, which has capacity for 5,000 people.

== Current squad ==
Note: Flags indicate national team as defined under FIFA eligibility rules; some limited exceptions apply. Players may hold more than one non-FIFA nationality.

No. / Pos. / Nation / Player	No. / Pos. / Nation / Player
