= 2019 Africa Cup of Nations qualification Group K =

Group K of the 2019 Africa Cup of Nations qualification tournament was one of the twelve groups to decide the teams which qualified for the 2019 Africa Cup of Nations finals tournament. The group consisted of four teams: Zambia, Mozambique, Guinea-Bissau, and Namibia.

The teams played against each other in home-and-away round-robin format between June 2017 and March 2019.

Guinea-Bissau and Namibia, the group winners and runners-up respectively, qualified for the 2019 Africa Cup of Nations.

== Standings ==
Pos	Team	Pld	W	D	L	GF	GA	GD	Pts	Qualification	Guinea-Bissau national football team	Namibia national football team	Mozambique national football team	Zambia national football team
1	Guinea-Bissau	6	2	3	1	8	7	+1	9	Final tournament	—	1–0	2–2	2–1
2	Namibia	6	2	2	2	5	7	−2	8 (Note: Head-to-head points: Namibia 6, Mozambique 0.)	Final tournament	0–0	—	1–0	1–1
3	Mozambique	6	2	2	2	7	7	0	8		2–2	1–2	—	1–0
4	Zambia	6	2	1	3	8	7	+1	7		2–1	4–1	0–1	—

Source: CAF
Rules for classification: Qualification tiebreakers

== Matches ==
10 June 2017
15:00 UTC+2

Zambia	0–1	Mozambique
	Report	Ratifo 90'

Levy Mwanawasa Stadium, Ndola
Referee: Victor Gomes (South Africa)
10 June 2017
16:00 UTC+0

Guinea-Bissau	1–0	Namibia
Gomes 23'	Report

Estádio 24 de Setembro, Bissau
Referee: Daniel Laryea (Ghana)

8 September 2018
16:00 UTC+2

Namibia	1–1	Zambia
Shilongo 79'	Report	Shonga 90+2'

Sam Nujoma Stadium, Windhoek
Referee: Juste Ephrem Zio (Burkina Faso)
8 September 2018
17:00 UTC+2

Mozambique	2–2	Guinea-Bissau
Zainadine 43'; Reginaldo 90+2'	Report	Embaló 51'; Mendy 90+8'

Estádio do Zimpeto, Maputo
Referee: Ahmad Imtehaz Heeralall (Mauritius)

10 October 2018
17:30 UTC+2

Zambia	2–1	Guinea-Bissau
Sunzu 17'; Shonga 52'	Report	Mendy 80'

National Heroes Stadium, Lusaka
Referee: Hassan Mohamed Hagi (Somalia)
13 October 2018
17:00 UTC+2

Mozambique	1–2	Namibia
Mexer 26'	Report	Shitembi 69'; Hotto 90'

Estádio do Zimpeto, Maputo
Referee: Hélder Martins de Carvalho (Angola)

14 October 2018
16:00 UTC+0

Guinea-Bissau	2–1	Zambia
Piqueti 53'; Silva 61'	Report	Shonga 12'

Estádio 24 de Setembro, Bissau
Referee: Kokou Ognankotan Ntale (Togo)
16 October 2018
19:00 UTC+2

Namibia	1–0	Mozambique
Shalulile 72'	Report

Sam Nujoma Stadium, Windhoek
Referee: Jean Marc Ganamandji (Central African Republic)

17 November 2018
16:00 UTC+2

Namibia	0–0	Guinea-Bissau
	Report

Sam Nujoma Stadium, Windhoek
Referee: Noureddine El Jaafari (Morocco)
18 November 2018
15:30 UTC+2

Mozambique	1–0	Zambia
Reginaldo 63'	Report

Estádio do Zimpeto, Maputo
Referee: Joshua Bondo (Botswana)

23 March 2019
16:30 UTC+0

Guinea-Bissau	2–2	Mozambique
Piqueti 13'; Mendy 90'	Report	Ratifo 48'; Nelson 89'

Estádio 24 de Setembro, Bissau
Referee: Sadok Selmi (Tunisia)
23 March 2019
18:30 UTC+2

Zambia	4–1	Namibia
Mulenga 13', 82'; Malama 55'; Kambole 90+1'	Report	Shalulile 90'

National Heroes Stadium, Lusaka
Referee: Bernard Camille (Seychelles)

== Goalscorers ==
There were 28 goals scored in 12 matches, for an average of 2.33 goals per match.

3 goals

- (Guinea-Bissau) Frédéric Mendy
- (Zambia) Justin Shonga

2 goals

- (Guinea-Bissau) Piqueti
- (Mozambique) Stanley Ratifo
- (Mozambique) Reginaldo
- (Namibia) Peter Shalulile
- (Zambia) Augustine Mulenga

1 goal

- (Guinea-Bissau) Carlos Embaló
- (Guinea-Bissau) Edigeison Gomes
- (Guinea-Bissau) Toni Silva
- (Mozambique) Mexer
- (Mozambique) Nelson
- (Mozambique) Zainadine
- (Namibia) Deon Hotto
- (Namibia) Benson Shilongo
- (Namibia) Petrus Shitembi
- (Zambia) Lazarous Kambole
- (Zambia) Donashano Malama
- (Zambia) Stoppila Sunzu
