= Gabriel Okechukwu =

Nigerian footballer

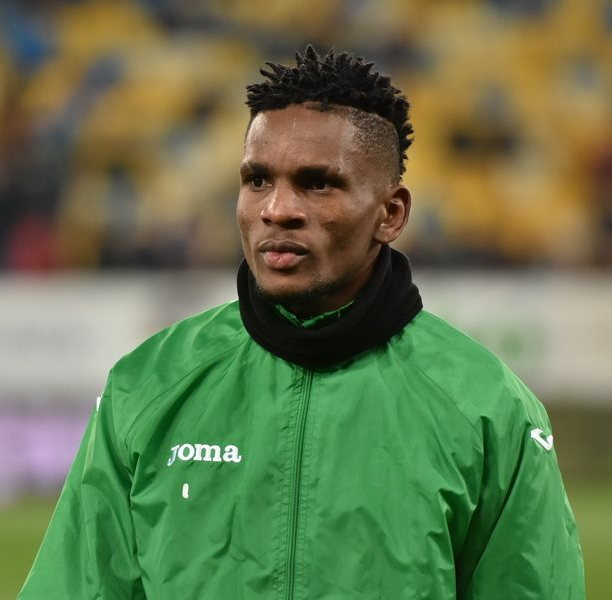

Personal information
- Full name: Gabriel Okechukwu
- Date of birth: 28 August 1995 (age 31)
- Place of birth: Lagos, Nigeria
- Height: 1.95 m (6 ft 5 in)
- Position: Forward

Team information
- Current team: Fukushima United FC (on loan from Hokkaido Consadole Sapporo)

Youth career
- 200?–2013: Water FC Academy

Senior career*
Years	Team	Apps	(Gls)
2013–2015	Water FC	17	(19)
2013	→ TEAP (loan)	18	(11)
2014–2015	→ St. George's (loan)	12	(13)
2016	Karpaty Lviv	6	(1)
2017–2018	Akwa United	16	(9)
2018–	Wydad Casablanca	7	(0)
2020	→ Chabab Mohammédia (loan)		
2021	Hokkaido Consadole Sapporo	0	(0)
2021	Fukushima United FC	2	(0)

International career
2015–2017	Nigeria U23	11	(9)
2018–	Nigeria	5	(2)
- * Club domestic league appearances and goals as of 19:19, 6 May 2020 (UTC)

Gabriel Okechukwu (born 28 August 1995) is a Nigerian footballer who plays for on loan from Chabab Mohammédia Wydad AC as a striker.

== Career ==
Okechukwu is a product of Water FC Academy in Abuja. In February 2016 he signed a contract with Ukrainian club FC Karpaty.

Okechukwu was on the provisional squad for the 2015 FIFA U-20 World Cup, but eventually did not play any games for this team. In May 2015 he was called up for the Nigeria national football team in the 2017 Africa Cup of Nations qualification to play against Chad national football team, but again he did not play in this match.

In August 2018, Okechukwu joined Wydad Casablanca in Morocco. After only seven appearances in the 2018-19 season and three in the 2019-20 season, he was loaned out to Chabab Mohammédia in January 2020.

In January 2021, Nigerian forward joined Consadole Sapporo FC in Japan. Gabriel Okechukwu joins the J1 League club on a three-year deal that will keep him at the club until 2024, in a deal worth €800,000

=== International goals ===
Scores and results list Nigeria's goal tally first.

No	Date	Venue	Opponent	Score	Result	Competition
1.	28 January 2018	Stade Ibn Batouta, Tangier, Morocco	Angola	2–1	2–1 (a.e.t.)	2018 African Nations Championship
2.	31 January 2018	Stade de Marrakech, Marrakesh, Morocco	Sudan	1–0	1–0	2018 African Nations Championship
