= Libya A' national football team =

National team for in-Libya players

Libya A'
- Nickname: The Mediterranean Knights
- Association: LFF (Libya)
- Confederation: CAF (Africa)
- FIFA code: LBY
First colours	Second colours

African Nations Championship
- Appearances: 3 (first in 2014)
- Best result: Champions (2014)

The Libyan A' national football team (Arabic: منتخب ليبيا لكرة القدم للمحليين) is the national football team of Libya and is open only to domestic league players. The team won the 2014 African Nations Championship in South Africa.

The primary men's Libya national football team contains expatriate players and represents Libya at the Africa Cup of Nations.

== African Nations Championship record ==
African Nations Championship
Appearances: 4
Year	Round	Position	Pld	W	D	L	GF	GA
(Ivory Coast) 2009	Group stage	7th	2	0	2	1	1	3
(Sudan) 2011	Did not qualify							
(South Africa) 2014	Champions	1st	6	1	5	0	5	3
(Rwanda) 2016	Did not qualify							
(Morocco) 2018	Third Place Playoff	4th	6	2	2	2	7	6
(Cameroon) 2020	Group stage	13th	3	0	2	1	1	2
(Algeria) 2022	Group stage	14th	3	0	1	2	5	5
(Kenya) (Tanzania) (Uganda) 2024	Withdrew							
Total	Champions	4/8	17	3	11	3	14	14
