= Alpha Oumar Sow (Senegalese footballer) =

Senegalese footballer

Personal information
- Date of birth: 12 February 1984 (age 42)
- Place of birth: Dakar, Senegal
- Height: 1.78 m (5 ft 10 in)
- Position: Forward

Senior career*
Years	Team	Apps	(Gls)
2007–2009	Casa Sports		
2009–2010	Corte		
2010–2011	Moissy-Cramayel	21	(4)
2011	Entente SSG		
2011–2013	ASC Jaraaf		
2013–2014	KAC Kénitra	21	(4)
2014–2017	Aït Melloul		
2017–2018	Taunton Town		

International career
2009–2013	Senegal	2	(0)
- * Club domestic league appearances and goals

Alpha Oumar Sow (born 12 February 1984) is a Senegalese former professional footballer who played as a forward. He made two appearances for the Senegal national team; one in 2009, and another in 2013.

== Honours ==
ASC Jaraaf

- Senegal FA Cup: 2013
