= Dayo Ojo =

Nigerian footballer

Personal information
- Full name: Dayo Ojo
- Date of birth: October 10, 1994 (age 32)
- Place of birth: Enugu, Nigeria
- Height: 1.78 m (5 ft 10 in)
- Position: Forward

Team information
- Current team: Enyimba F.C.
- Number: 9

Youth career
- 2006: Karamone

Senior career*
Years	Team	Apps	(Gls)
2008-2009	Rising Stars F.C.	24	(13)
2010-2016	Sunshine Stars F.C.	112	(42)
2016-2017	Al-Merrikh SC		
2017-2019	Sunshine Stars F.C.		
2019-	Enyimba International F.C.		

International career^{‡}
2010–11	Nigeria U-17	3	(1)
2012	Nigeria U-20	1	(0)
2018–	Nigeria	5	(1)
- * Club domestic league appearances and goals as of 13 October 2015 ‡ National team caps and goals as of 18 May 2019

Dayo Ojo (born October 10, 1994) is a professional Nigerian footballer who is currently with Nigerian Premier League club Enyimba International F.C.

== Career ==
Dayo Ojo began his professional league career with Rising Stars F.C. in 2008. In 2010, he was transferred to Sunshine Stars F.C., where he has been playing till 2016 December when his contract ended.

== International career ==
Dayo Ojo was member of the Nigeria U-17 2010. He started his professional football career with Rising Stars F.C. in 2009 and got promotion into the senior team Sunshine Stars F.C. in 2010. He was part of 2010/11 Nigeria u17 national team and presently part of the Nigeria Super Eagles A international team. Dayo Ojo was a member of Sunshine Stars team that got to the Semi Finals of the CAF Confederations Cup in 2011 and the CAF Champions League in 2012. Dayo Ojo is currently a member of the Nigeria Professional Football League All Star Team that is visiting Spain in August 2016 to feature in tournaments and friendlies against Valencia, Malaga and one other Spanish Side.

=== International goals ===
Scores and results list Nigeria's goal tally first.

No	Date	Venue	Opponent	Score	Result	Competition
1.	23 January 2018	Stade Adrar, Agadir, Morocco	Equatorial Guinea	2–1	3–1	2018 African Nations Championship
