= Nigeria A' national football team =

National team for in-Nigeria players

Nigeria A'
- Nickname: CHAN Eagles
- Association: Nigeria Football Federation
- Confederation: CAF (Africa)
- Sub-confederation: WAFU (West Africa)
- Head coach: Gernot Rohr
- Home stadium: Agege Stadium
- FIFA code: NGA
First colours	Second colours

African Nations Championship
- Appearances: 3 (first in 2014)
- Best result: 2nd (2018)

WAFU Nations Cup
- Appearances: 4 (first in 2010)
- Best result: 1st (2010)

The Nigeria A' national football team is the local national football team of Nigeria and is open only to indigenous domestic league players. The team represents Nigeria at the WAFU Nations Cup and the African Nations Championship and is controlled by the Nigeria Football Federation. They are also known as the CHAN Eagles.

The CHAN Eagles came third at the 2014 African Nations Championship, at the 2018 edition hosted in Morocco, Nigeria reached the final but lost 4–0 to the hosts.

They have also appeared at the WAFU Nations Cup 4 times, hosting the tournament twice and winning the 2010 edition.

== African Nations Championship record ==
African Nations Championship
Appearances: 3
Year	Round	Position	Pld	W	D*	L	GF	GA
(Ivory Coast) 2009	Did not qualify							
(Sudan) 2011	Did not qualify							
(South Africa) 2014	Third place	3rd	6	4	1	1	14	7
(Rwanda) 2016	Group stage	9th	3	1	1	1	5	3
(Morocco) 2018	Runners-up	2nd	6	4	1	1	7	6
(Cameroon) 2020	Did not qualify							
(Algeria) 2022	Did not qualify							
(Kenya) (Tanzania) (Uganda) 2024	To be determined							
Total	Runners-up	3/8	15	9	3	3	26	16

== WAFU Nations Cup record ==
WAFU Nations Cup
Appearances: 4
Year	Round	Position	Pld	W	D*	L	GF	GA
(Nigeria) 2010	Champions	1st	5	5	0	0	14	1
(Nigeria) 2011	Second-place	2nd	4	3	0	1	9	4
(Ghana) 2013	Did not qualify							
(Ghana) 2017	Second-place	2nd	6	3	2	1	6	4
(Senegal) 2019	Quarter-finals (PC)	5th	2	0	1	1	2	3
(Nigeria) 2021	Qualified							
Total	Champions	4/5	17	11	3	3	31	12

== Results ==
22 September 2019 2020 African Nations Championship qualification	Togo	4–1	Nigeria	Stade de Kégué, Lomé
16:00 (UTC±0)	Nane 16', 67'; Tchakei 75' (pen.); Agoro 90+2'	Report	Ibrahim 8'	Referee: Adissa Ligali (Benin)

29 September 2019 2019 WAFU Cup of Nations	Nigeria	1–2	Togo	Stade Lat-Dior, Thiès
18:00 (UTC±0)	Sikiru 32'	Report	Adjahli 16'; Ndah 43' (o.g.)	Referee: Dahane Beida (Mauritania)

5 October 2019 2019 WAFU Cup of Nations	Nigeria	1–1 (2–3 p)	Cape Verde	Stade Lat-Dior, Thiès
18:00 (UTC±0)	Sikiru 65'	Report	Cardoso 87'	Referee: (Ms) Vincentia Amedome (Togo)

19 October 2019 2020 African Nations Championship qualification	Nigeria	2–0	Togo	Agege Stadium, Lagos
16:00 (UTC+1)	Sikiru 9', 71'	Report		Referee: Abdoulaye Rhissa Al-Mustapha (Nigerien Football Federation)

== Squad ==
The following players were called up for the 2020 African Nations Championship qualification and 2019 WAFU Cup of Nations matches against Togo and Cape Verde.

Caps and goals as of 19 October 2019 after the match against Togo.

No.	Pos.	Player	Date of birth (age)	Caps	Goals	Club
	GK	Theophilus Afelokhai	7 April 1988 (age 37)	4	0	(Nigeria Football Federation) Enyimba
	GK	Ikechukwu Ezenwa	16 October 1988 (age 37)	21	0	(Nigeria Football Federation) Katsina United
	DF	Denis Nya	1 December 1996 (age 29)	3	0	(Nigeria Football Federation) Akwa United
	DF	Ifeanyi Anaemena	16 February 1992 (age 33)	3	0	(Nigeria Football Federation) Enyimba
	DF	John Lazarus	6 June 1998 (age 27)	4	0	(Nigeria Football Federation) Lobi Stars
	DF	Daniel Itodo	14 December 1996 (age 29)	5	0	(Nigeria Football Federation) Plateau United
	DF	Ifeanyi Nweke	10 November 1997 (age 28)	3	0	(Nigeria Football Federation) Kano Pillars
	DF	Ebube Duru	31 July 1999 (age 26)	3	0	(Nigeria Football Federation) Lobi Stars
	MF	Mathias Martins	23 December 1996 (age 29)	4	0	(Nigeria Football Federation) Lobi Stars
	MF	Nyima Nwagua	9 May 1993 (age 32)	3	0	(Nigeria Football Federation) Kano Pillars
	MF	Ibrahim Olawoyin		1	0	(Nigeria Football Federation) Enugu Rangers
	MF	Fatai Gbadamosi	11 November 1998 (age 27)	3	0	(Nigeria Football Federation) Shooting Stars
	MF	Anthony Shimaga	24 August 1997 (age 28)	1	0	(Nigeria Football Federation) Enugu Rangers
	FW	Chisom Orji	5 April 2001 (age 24)	1	0	(Nigeria Football Federation) Collins Edwin
	FW	Ndifreke Udo	15 August 1998 (age 27)	5	0	(Nigeria Football Federation) Akwa United
	FW	Olisa Harold Ndah	21 January 1998 (age 27)	4	0	(Nigeria Football Federation) Remo Stars
	FW	Mfon Udoh	14 March 1992 (age 33)	7	1	(Nigeria Football Federation) Akwa United
	FW	Sunusi Ibrahim	1 October 2002 (age 23)	2	1	(Nigeria Football Federation) Nasarawa United
	FW	Alimi Sikiru	23 March 1996 (age 29)	4	4	(Nigeria Football Federation) Lobi Stars

=== Previous squads ===
African Nations Championship squads

- CHAN 2014 squad
- CHAN 2016 squad
- CHAN 2018 squad

== Honours ==
African Nations Championship:

- Second place: 2018
- Third place: 2014

WAFU Nations Cup

- Champions: 2010
