= Old Parade Ground =

Sports stadium in Abuja, Nigeria

- Abuja Mini-Stadium
- Interactive map of Old Parade Ground
- Location: Garki District
- Coordinates: 9°2′34″N 7°29′20″E
- Surface: Grass

Old Parade Ground is a stadium in the Garki District of Abuja, Nigeria. Built in the early 1980s, it is currently used mostly for football matches and is the home stadium of various teams in the Federal Capital Territory, including Abuja F.C. and Court of Appeal. The stadium has a capacity of about 5,000.

In addition to football games, the ground hosts rallies and concerts.
