= Chisom Orji =

Nigerian footballer

Personal information
- Full name: Chisom Martins Orji
- Date of birth: 5 April 2001 (age 25)
- Position: Forward

Team information
- Current team: Sporting Lagos FC
- Number: 12

Youth career
- Collins Edwin

Senior career*
| Years | Team | Apps | (Gls) |
| 2019-2023 | Collins Edwin | | |
| 2021-2022 | Famlicao U23 (loan) | | |
| 2023- | Sporting Lagos FC | | |

International career^{‡}
| 2019– | Nigeria | 1 | (0) |
- * Club domestic league appearances and goals as of 01:14, 10 April 2020 (UTC) ‡ National team caps and goals as of 01:14, 10 April 2020 (UTC)

Chisom Martins Orji (born 5 April 2001) is a Nigerian international footballer who currently plays as a forward for the Nigeria national team.

== Career statistics ==
=== International ===
As of matches played 10 April 2020.

| National team | Year | Apps | Goals |
|---|---|---|---|
| Nigeria | 2019 | 1 | 0 |
| Total | | 1 | 0 |
