= 2016 African Nations Championship final =

Football match held in Rwanda

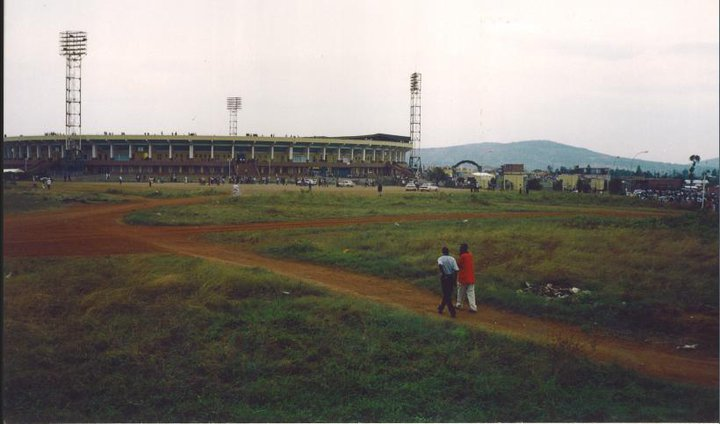
- Event: 2016 African Nations Championship
DR Congo	Mali
(Democratic Republic of the Congo)	(Mali)
3	0
- Date: 7 February 2016
- Venue: Amahoro Stadium, Kigali
- Referee: Daniel Bennett
- Attendance: 25,000+

The 2016 African Nations Championship final was a football match to determine the winners of the CHAN 2016 tournament and took place on 7 February 2016. The match contested by DR Congo and Mali at the Amahoro Stadium in Kigali. DR Congo won the match 3–0, winning the title for the second time. DR Congo became the first nation to win the trophy twice, having won the inaugural CHAN tournament.

== Background ==
DR Congo appeared in their 3rd tournament, and their 2nd final. There previous best performance in the tournament was reaching the finals in 2009 and won that tournament. Mail was also making its 3rd appears in the tournament and their best performance in the tournament was in 2014 reaching the quarter-finals. DR Congo beat the host nation Rwanda 1–2 (a.e.t.) in the quarter-finals and beat Guinea 5–4 on Penalties after a 1–1 in regulation time in the semi-finals. Mail beat Tunisia 2–1 in the quarter-finals and beat Ivory Coast 1–0 in the Semi-finals.

== Route to the final ==
DR Congo
Round
Mali
Opponents
Result
Group stage
Opponents
Result
Ethiopia
3–0
Match 1
Uganda
2–2
Angola
4–2
Match 2
Zimbabwe
1–0
Cameroon
1–3
Match 3
Zambia
0–0
Group B winner

Pos	Team	Pld	Pts
1	Cameroon	3	7
2	DR Congo	3	6
3	Angola	3	3
4	Ethiopia	3	1

Source: CAF
Final standings
Group D Runner-up

Pos	Team	Pld	Pts
1	Zambia	3	7
2	Mali	3	5
3	Uganda	3	2
4	Zimbabwe	3	1

Source: CAF
Opponents
Result
Knockout stage
Opponents
Result
Rwanda
1–2 (a.e.t.)
Quarter-finals
Tunisia
2–1
Guinea
1–1 (aet) (5–4 Pen)
Semi-finals
Ivory Coast
1–0

== Match ==
=== Details ===
7 February 2016
18:30

DR Congo	3–0	Mali
Meschak 29', 61'; Bolingi 73'	Report

Amahoro Stadium, Kigali
Referee: Daniel Bennett (South Africa)

== See also ==
- 2016 African Nations Championship
