= Justin Shonga =

Zambian footballer (1996–2024)

Personal information
- Date of birth: 5 November 1996
- Place of birth: Chipata, Zambia
- Date of death: 30 June 2024 (aged 27)
- Place of death: Lusaka, Zambia
- Height: 1.79 m (5 ft 10 in)
- Position: Forward

Senior career*
Years	Team	Apps	(Gls)
2016–2017	Nkwazi		
2017–2020	Orlando Pirates	56	(10)
2020	Tshakhuma Tsha Madzivhandila	6	(1)
2021	Cape Town City	12	(0)
2021	Ismaily SC	4	(0)
2022	Sekhukhune United	10	(2)
2023	Nkwazi		
2023–2024	Gagra	16	(2)
2024	Najran		

International career
2017–2021	Zambia	33	(16)
Medal record
Orlando Pirates
Runner-up	Premier Soccer League	2017–18
Zambia
Runner-up	COSAFA Cup	2017
- * Club domestic league appearances and goals

Justin Shonga (5 November 1996 – 30 June 2024) was a Zambian professional footballer who played as a forward.

== Club career ==
Shonga signed with South African side Orlando Pirates in late 2017 from Nkwazi of his native Zambia.

On 2 February 2024, Shonga joined Najran.

== Death ==
Shonga died in Lusaka on 30 June 2024, at the age of 27 reportedly of an illness.

== Career statistics ==
=== Club ===
Appearances and goals by club, season and competition
Club	Season	League			National cup		League cup		Continental		Other		Total	
Club	Season	Division	Apps	Goals	Apps	Goals	Apps	Goals	Apps	Goals	Apps	Goals	Apps	Goals
Orlando Pirates	2017–18	ABSA Premiership	19	4	2 (Note: Appearances in the Nedbank Cup)	0	2 (Note: Appearance in the Telkom Knockout)	0	–		0	0	23	4
Career total			19	4	2	0	2	0	0	0	0	0	23	4

=== International ===
Appearances and goals by national team and year
National team	Year	Apps	Goals
Zambia	2017	12	6
Zambia	2018	7	5
Zambia	2019	8	2
Zambia	2020	2	0
Zambia	2021	4	3
Total		33	16

Scores and results list Zambia's goal tally first, score column indicates score after each Shonga goal.

List of international goals scored by Justin Shonga
No.	Date	Venue	Opponent	Score	Result	Competition
1	5 July 2017	Moruleng Stadium, Saulspoort, South Africa	Tanzania	2–1	4–2	2017 COSAFA Cup
2	5 July 2017	Moruleng Stadium, Saulspoort, South Africa	Tanzania	4–1	4–2	2017 COSAFA Cup
3	22 July 2017	National Heroes Stadium, Lusaka, Zambia	Swaziland	1–0	3–0	2018 African Nations Championship qualification
4	12 August 2017	Buffalo City Stadium, East London, South Africa	South Africa	2–2	2–2	2018 African Nations Championship qualification
5	19 August 2017	Levy Mwanawasa Stadium, Ndola, Zambia	South Africa	1–0	2–0	2018 African Nations Championship qualification
6	19 August 2017	Levy Mwanawasa Stadium, Ndola, Zambia	South Africa	2–0	2–0	2018 African Nations Championship qualification
7	21 March 2018	Levy Mwanawasa Stadium, Ndola, Zambia	South Africa	1–1	2–2 (4–5 p)	2018 Four Nations Tournament
8	8 September 2018	Sam Nujoma Stadium, Windhoek, Namibia	Namibia	1–1	3–1	2019 Africa Cup of Nations qualification
9	11 September 2018	Stade d'Angondjé, Libreville, Gabon	Gabon	1–0	1–0	Friendly
10	10 October 2018	Levy Mwanawasa Stadium, Ndola, Zambia	Guinea-Bissau	2–0	2–1	2019 Africa Cup of Nations qualification
11	14 October 2018	Estádio 24 de Setembro, Bissau, Guinea-Bissau	Guinea-Bissau	1–0	1–2	2019 Africa Cup of Nations qualification
12	13 October 2019	Stade Charles de Gaulle, Porto-Novo, Benin	Benin	1–0	2–2	Friendly
13	13 October 2019	Stade Charles de Gaulle, Porto-Novo, Benin	Benin	2–1	2–2	Friendly
14	8 July 2021	Wolfson Stadium, Port Elizabeth, South Africa	Lesotho	1–0	1–2	2021 COSAFA Cup
15	13 July 2021	Wolfson Stadium, Port Elizabeth, South Africa	Botswana	1–0	2–1	2021 COSAFA Cup
16	13 July 2021	Wolfson Stadium, Port Elizabeth, South Africa	Botswana	2–1	2–1	2021 COSAFA Cup
