= Wend-Panga Bambara =

Burkinabé footballer

Personal information
- Full name: Wend-Panga Arnauld Bambara
- Date of birth: 12 September 1996 (age 30)
- Position: Midfielder

Team information
- Current team: US des Forces Armées

Senior career*
Years	Team	Apps	(Gls)
2017–	US des Forces Armées		

International career^{‡}
2018–	Burkina Faso	2	(0)
- * Club domestic league appearances and goals as of 14:02, 27 September 2018 (UTC) ‡ National team caps and goals as of 14:02, 27 September 2018 (UTC)

Wend-Panga Arnauld Bambara (born 12 September 1996) is a Burkinabé international footballer who plays for US des Forces Armées, as a midfielder.

== Career ==
He has played club football for US des Forces Armées.

He made his international debut for Burkina Faso in 2018.
