= Anas Zniti =

Moroccan footballer

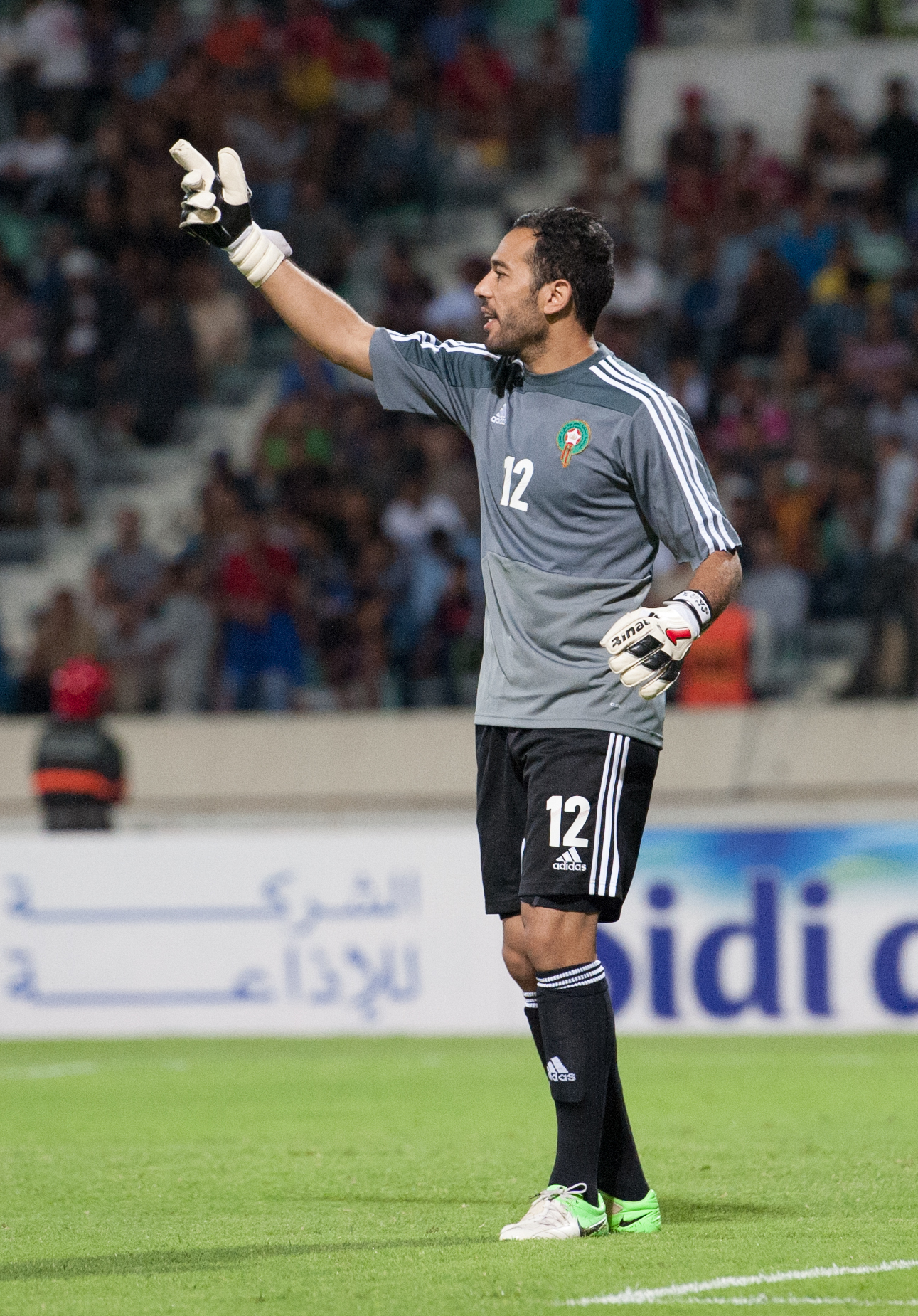
- Anas Zniti with Morocco in 2014

Personal information
- Full name: Anas Zniti
- Date of birth: 28 August 1988 (age 38)
- Place of birth: Fez, Morocco
- Height: 1.82 m (6 ft 0 in)
- Position: Goalkeeper

Youth career
- 2000–2006: Maghreb Fez

Senior career*
Years	Team	Apps	(Gls)
2006–2013	Maghreb Fez	107	(0)
2013–2015	AS FAR	58	(0)
2015–2025	Raja CA	376	(0)
2025	Al Wasl	0	(0)
2026	RS Berkane	17	(0)

International career^{‡}
2004–2006	Morocco U-20	4	(0)
2006–2010	Morocco U-23	11	(0)
2013–2022	Morocco	18	(0)
2018–2021	Morocco A'	5	(0)
Medal record
Men's football
Representing Morocco
African Nations Championship
Winner	2018 Morocco
Winner	2020 Cameroon
- * Club domestic league appearances and goals as of 15 January 2025 ‡ National team caps and goals as of 8 June 2024

Anas Zniti (Arabic: أنس الزنيتي; born 28 October 1988) is a Moroccan professional footballer who plays as a goalkeeper for the Morocco national team. He previously played for Maghreb Fez and AS FAR.

In March 2006, Zniti was called up for a training camp of the Morocco Olympic squad, remaining in the squad the following year for further Olympic qualifying games.

== Early life ==
Anas Zniti was born on 28 October 1988, the son of the Maghreb Fez School, who has been promoted to the first team since 2008. Anas family has always supported him and encouraged him to play sports, and this is not strange because he belongs to a family that cares much about football, his mother was a goalkeeper and his father used to play rugby in the ranks of the Fez Sports Federation

== Club career ==
=== Maghreb fez ===
Zniti started his professional career playing for Fez. He spent a total of 8 seasons playing for Maghreb Fez. He achieved the Throne Cup title in 2011 in addition to the 2011 African Confederation Cup in the same year in a final match against Tunisian Sfaxien, in which he started and saved two penalty kicks and managed to score the last kick that gifted the title to Al-fas. He also led the club to achieving the 2012 African Super Cup, eventually His contract ended with Maghreb Fez in June 2013.

=== FAR Rabat ===
After the end of his contract with Maghreb Fez, he received two offers from two European teams, but the understanding between them and his manager did not happen, and therefore there was no need to discuss the offers, which he received, especially since he had the desire to take a new experience in his football path. He then signed with Royal Army team. He spent a total of 3 seasons with the team but having no success with them achieving absolutely nothing.

=== Raja CA ===
On 26 May 2015, Zniti signed a contract with Raja CA. He had a huge success with the team winning over 7 titles. He won his first title with Raja after a draw with Libyan football team Al-Hilal SC (Benghazi) to win the 2015 UNAF Club Cup. on 2017 he won his second title after defeating Difaâ Hassani El Jadidi to achieve the 2017 Moroccan Throne Cup. In 2018 starts Raja glory in Africa. He won the 2018 CAF Confederation Cup with the team after defeating AS Vita Club in the finals which guaranteed them a spot in the 2019 CAF Super Cup, eventually Him and his team won the title after a 2–1 victory over Espérance Sportive de Tunis take took place in Thani bin Jassim Stadium in Qatar.

In 2020, He won the league for the first time. and won the 2020 Arab Champions League after defeating Al-Ittihad 4–3 in penalties after saving Fahad Al-Muwallad penalty. In 2021, he achieved the 2021 CAF Confederation Cup after defeating JS Kabylie 2–1 in the final. Raja lost the 2021 CAF Super Cup against Al Ahly SC in penalties.

== International career ==
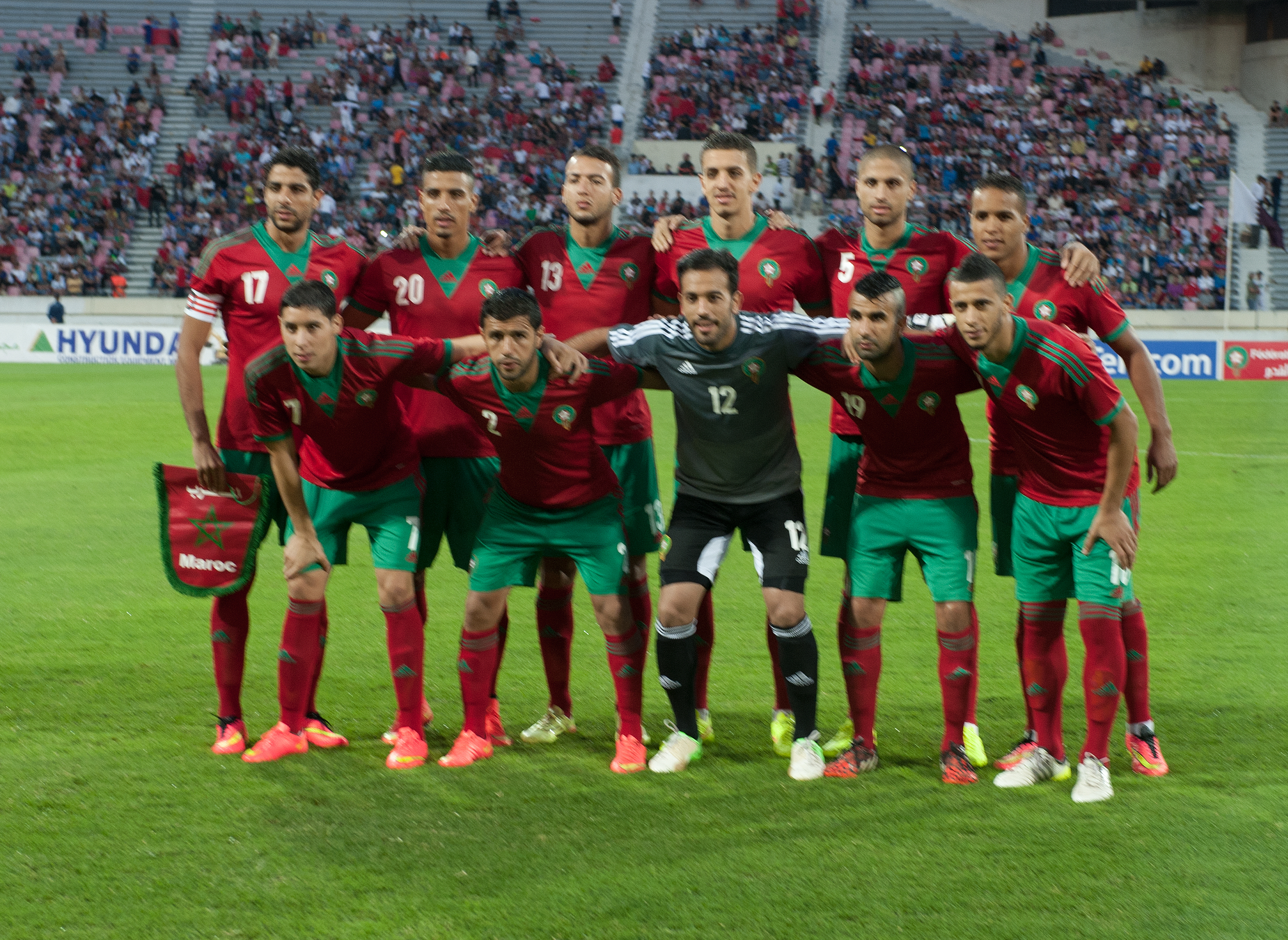
Zniti lining up for the Moroccan national team in 2014

At national level, Zniti plays for the Moroccan A' team. He is considered the second goalkeeper and the successor to Nadir Lamyaghri in the first team. On 12 December 2012, he played his first match with the Moroccan national team for local players in a friendly against Niger. He also played his first match with the first team against Zambia in a warm-up. For the 2013 Africa Cup of Nations on 8 January 2013.

Anas Zniti represented Morocco in the 2018 African Nations Championship, helping them to achieve their first CHAN title.

He also played in the 2020 African Nations Championship. Morocco won again and becoming the first and only side so far to win the CHAN back to back.

On 30 December 2021, Zniti broke his hand after being invited to participate in the 2021 Africa Cup of Nations.

== Honours ==
Mas Fès

- Moroccan Throne Cup: 2011
- CAF Confederation Cup: 2011
- CAF Super Cup: 2012

Raja CA

- Botola Pro: 2019–20, 2023–24
- Moroccan Throne Cup: 2017, 2023
- UNAF Club Cup: 2015
- Arab Club Champions Cup: 2019–20
- CAF Confederation Cup: 2018, 2020–21
- CAF Super Cup: 2019

Morocco A'

- African Nations Championship: 2018, 2020

Individual

- Mas Fès Player of the Season: 2010–11, 2011–12
- Botola Pro Best Goalkeeper: 2011, 2017, 2020, 2021, 2022, 2024
- Botola Pro Team of the Season: 2020–21, 2023–24
- African Nations Championship Best Goalkeeper: 2020
- African Nations Championship Team of the Tournament: 2018
- CAF Champions League Best Goalkeeper: 2020
- Raja CA Player of the Season: 2020–21
