= African Nations Championship =

Football tournament

- Organiser(s): CAF
- Founded: 2009
- Abolished: 2025; 1 year ago
- Region: Africa
- Teams: 19
- Last champions: Morocco (3rd title)
- Most championships: Morocco (3 titles)
- Broadcasters: SuperSport; StarTimes
- Website: Tickets

The African Nations Championship, commonly abbreviated as CHAN, (Note: French: Championnat d'Afrique des Nations; Arabic: بطولة أمم إفريقيا للمحليين, lit. Championship of African Nations) was a biennial African association football tournament organised by the Confederation of African Football (CAF). It was first announced in September 2007 and held from 2009. The participating teams consisted of players who were playing in their national league competitions. The tournament was held biennially and alternated with the Africa Cup of Nations, and was commonly referred to as the Africa Cup of Nations for locally based players.

Morocco was the most successful team in this tournament with three titles, followed by DR Congo with two titles, and Tunisia, Libya and Senegal with one title each. The tournament began life in 2009 with 8 teams, which was doubled for the second edition up until the sixth and was contested by 18 teams since the 2022 edition.

From the 2014 edition onward, matches from qualification to the final were computed to determine the FIFA World Rankings after each tournament, a move CAF described at the time as an important step in the competition's development.

On 20 December 2025, CAF president Patrice Motsepe announced the abolition of the African Nations Championship in a press conference, with the African Nations League introduced as its replacement.

== History ==
=== Development ===
The conception of this tournament came on 11 September 2007 during a CAF Executive Committee in Johannesburg, South Africa, with the aim being to give homegrown players opportunities to represent their nations and promote their home leagues globally. The tournament was approved and confirmed in January 2008 before that year's Africa Cup of Nations in Ghana. Following its conclusion of that tournament in February, CAF voted unanimously for Ivory Coast against firm-favourite countries like Sudan and Egypt to host the inaugural edition, after which the tournament dates and schedules were confirmed.

=== Inauguration and commencement ===
Qualification for the inaugural edition began on 29 March and concluded on 14 December 2008, which ended with seven teams joining Ivory Coast at the inaugural edition. The inaugural tournament match kicked off between Zambia and Ivory Coast on 22 February 2009 at the Felix Houphouet Boigny Stadium in Abidjan with Zambian Given Singuluma scoring the tournament's first goal. In Group A, Zambia and Senegal qualified at the expense of Tanzania and Ivory Coast. In Group B, Ghana and DR Congo qualified for the knockout stages with Zimbabwe and Libya eliminated.

In the semi-finals, Ghana defeated Senegal on penalties whereas DR Congo beat Zambia to advance to the final. Zambia nonetheless finished their inaugural CHAN campaign on a high after defeating Senegal in the third-place match. DR Congo defeated Ghana 2–0 in the final at the same stadium that opened the tournament to became the inaugural champions, thus in the process ending a 35-year wait for an international trophy win of any sort.

=== Tournament expansion ===
The rapid interest of African countries in the tournament led to an increase in team participation from 8 to 16 in its second edition hosted by Sudan amid a struggle for the independence for the southern part of the country in 2011. It was hosted in four cities; Omdurman, Khartoum, Wad Madani and Port Sudan. Qualification for that edition began on 11 January and concluded on 6 June 2010, with 11 teams making their tournament debuts and 5 teams, including Ghana and Libya, returned for the second edition.

The 2011 edition was seen by the media as "very irregular", as there was a dominant team in each group but all the second teams were decided in the third and final group stage round. Cameroon and South Africa won all their group stage matches, but ended up losing to Angola and Algeria respectively in the quarter-finals. Meanwhile, Sudan beat Niger on penalties and Tunisia beat then-defending champions DR Congo.

In the semi-finals on 22 February 2011, Tunisia v Algeria and Sudan v Angola finished 1–1 after the regulation 120 minutes, with Tunisia beating Algeria 3–5 on penalties and Angola winning 4–2 against Sudan also on penalties. The second tournament editions hosts Sudan thus finished their campaign off on a high with third place and bronze medals after beating Algeria 1–0. Tunisia and Angola got a rematch in the final after a group stage 1–1 drawn match, with the former claiming the title on its debut with a 3–0 win over Angola.

=== FIFA recognition ===
Cape Town Stadium, one of the 2010 FIFA World Cup stadiums, home of the 2014 final.

CAF changed the frequency of the Africa Cup of Nations following the 2010 edition to odd-numbered years so as not to clash with the FIFA World Cup, which had a consequential knock-on effect on CHAN, which was from then on held biennially in even-numbered years. CAF also named Libya as hosts of the 2013 AFCON and the 2014 CHAN, but had both hosting rights stripped at the onset of the first Libyan civil war. Several countries offered themselves as replacement hosts, including Egypt and South Africa, with the latter chosen as the hosts, citing the credential of its impressive infrastructural hosting of the 2010 FIFA World Cup.

The third edition ran from 11 January to 1 February 2014 and was labelled by the media as "fantastic", as they claimed the host nation's stadiums which hosted World Cup matches 4 years earlier "gave a different touch to the tournament". Like the second edition, the quarter-finalists were decided in the third and final round, with decisive goals in added-on time in each group and the knockout stages except the final were decided by the odd goal or on penalties. In the match for third place, Nigeria, who had several players on their team who won the final of the previous year's AFCON and were preparing for the 2014 FIFA World Cup, won the bronze medal, after beating Zimbabwe 1–0.

The final was held in Cape Town between Ghana and then-surprise package Libya. The match, like that entire edition, was very tight and ended 0–0 and the champions were determined by penalties. After 6 penalties per side, Libya won their inaugural CHAN title and their first continental title in its history, which at the time was more than impressive given than they won a single match in the group stage against Ethiopia and went undefeated through consecutive draws and penalty shoot-out wins.

=== Moroccan and Congolese domination ===
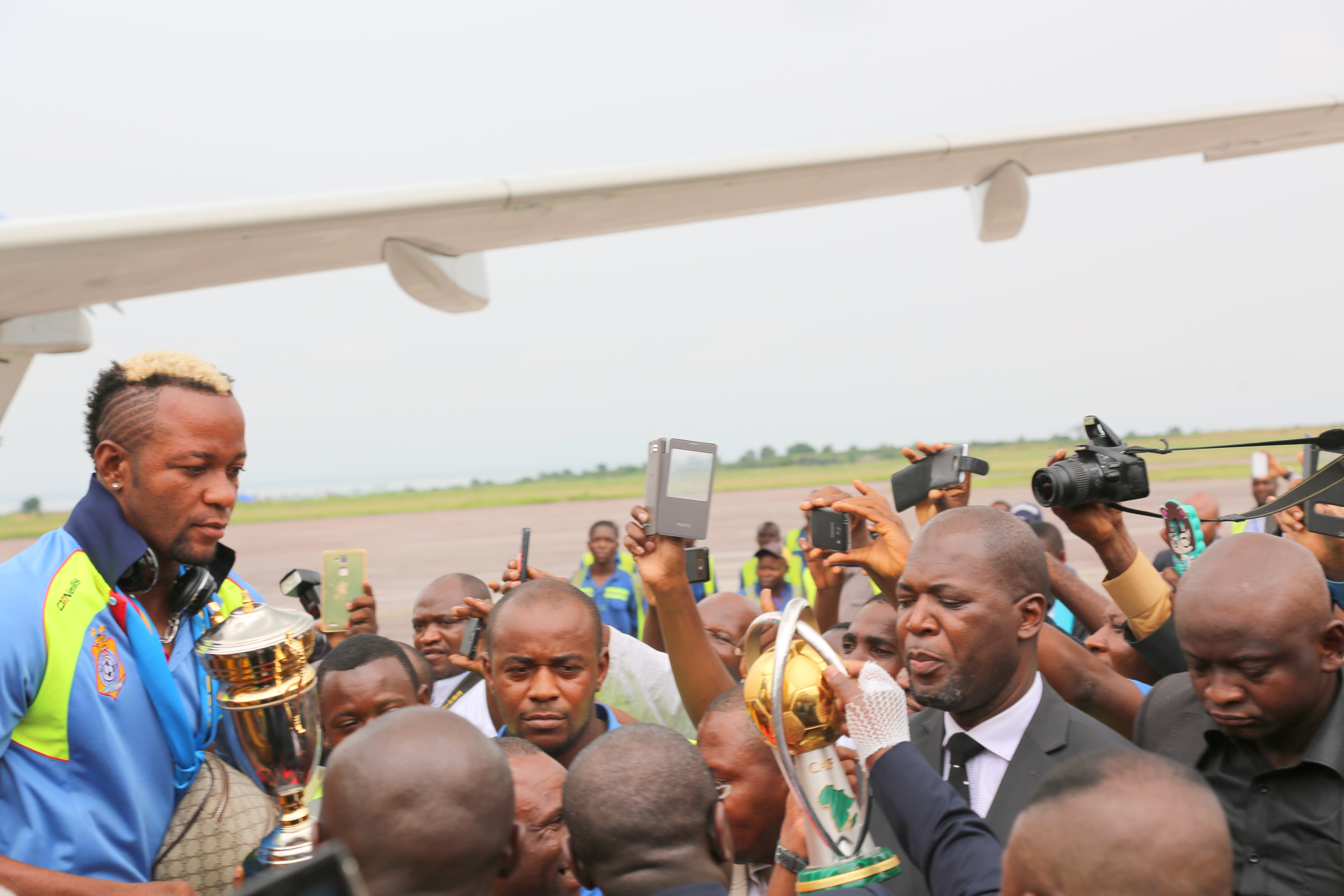
The Leopards welcomed at N'djili Airport after winning the 2016 edition.

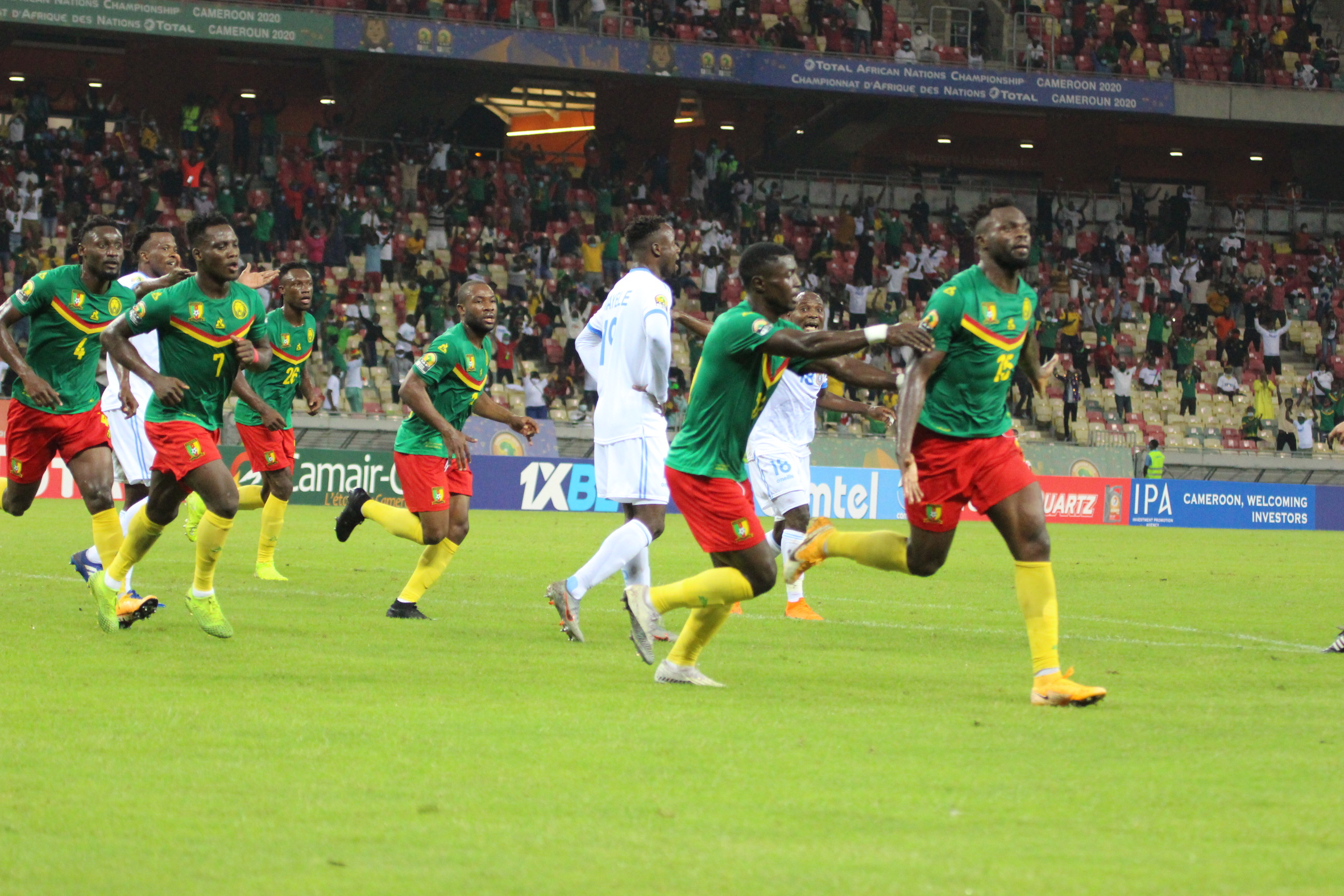
Cameroon vs DR Congo at the quarter-finals of the 2020 edition.

The 4th edition of the tournament was held from 16 January to 7 February 2016 in Rwanda and DR Congo claimed their second title defeating Mali, in the final for the first time and thus representing their best tournament performance, 3–0 in the final.

The 5th edition in 2018 was originally scheduled to be hosted in Kenya, but due to several delays in preparation and organisation, CAF stripped the country of the hosting rights and opened a new election process. On 14 October 2017, CAF announced Morocco as the new host of the 2018 edition, which was played between 13 January to 4 February. One of the main reasons why Morocco applied to be an organiser is because it was looking to host the 2026 FIFA World Cup, so the tournament represented one of the country's last chances to show itself as a strong candidate. The final pitted hosts Morocco and Nigeria; both teams were undefeated throughout that edition of the tournament and only had a draw to their credit in their respective group stages. Morocco won the match 4–0, winning the title for the first time and becoming the first host nation to win the tournament.

Morocco successfully defended their title in the 2020 edition, postponed to 2021 due to the COVID-19 pandemic in Africa and its impact, by defeating Mali 2–0 in the final on 7 February 2021, thus becoming the first and so far only nation to win back-to-back titles. On 4 February 2023, Senegal defeated Algeria in the penalty shootout to become the first West African nation to win the title, which followed on from their win in the 2021 Africa Cup of Nations.

The seventh edition was played in Algeria from 13 January to 4 February 2023. Eighteen teams were supposed to be contesting in this edition, which would have been an increase of 2 teams from the previous edition in 2020; but defending champions Morocco were unable to defend their title due to political tensions with Algerian authorities which began with Algeria's unilaterally decision in 2021 to close its airspace to Moroccan flights, including and especially its official carrier Royal Air Maroc. Senegal won their first title after defeating Algeria in the final 5–4 on penalties after the match ended 0–0. Senegal became the first team to win the Africa Cup of Nations and the African Nations Championship back-to-back.

Morocco won their record third title in the 2024 edition, held in Kenya, Uganda, and Tanzania, defeating Madagascar 3–2 in the final.

On 20 December 2025, CAF President Dr Motsepe announced the cancellation of the African Nations Championship during a press conference, with the African Nations League introduced as its replacement.

== Sponsorship ==
On 21 July 2016, French energy and petroleum giant TotalEnergies secured an 8-year sponsorship package from CAF to sponsor its competitions.

== Format ==
=== Qualification ===
For the inaugural edition of the tournament in 2009, teams for the group stage were allocated as follows:

- One each for North, West A, West B, Central, and Central East
- Two for the southern region
- One for the host country of the final tournament

From the second edition in 2011 until the 6th edition in 2021 (originally 2020), the expansion of national team participation to 16 teams led to the change in zonal team allocations, including the host country, were as follows:

- Northern Region: Two teams, out of 5, qualified through a single elimination round.
- Western Region A: Two teams, out of 6, qualified through two playoffs.
- Western Region B: Three teams, out of 7, qualified through two playoffs.
- Central Region: Three teams, out of 5, qualified through two playoffs.
- Central Eastern Region: Three teams, out of 8, qualified through two playoffs.
- Southern Region: Two teams, out of 9, qualified through three playoffs.

=== Group phase ===
Until 2021, the group stage consisting of 16 teams were divided into four groups of four teams each. Within each group they face each other once, through the system of all against all. Depending on the result of each match, three points are awarded to the winner, one point to each team in case of a tie, and none to the loser.

The two best-ranked teams from each group advance to the next round. If at the conclusion of the group matches, two teams finish level on points, the following tie-breaking criteria apply:

1. The highest number of points obtained taking into account all the group matches.
2. The highest goal difference considering all group matches.
3. The highest number of goals scored in favour taking into account all group matches.

If two or more teams are tied based on the above guidelines, their positions will be determined by the following criteria, in order of preference:

1. The highest number of points obtained in the matches between the teams in question.
2. The goal difference taking into account the matches between the teams in question.
3. The highest number of goals scored by each team in the matches played between the teams in question.

If after applying the above criteria two teams are still tied, the above three criteria are reapplied to the match played between the two teams in question to determine their final standings. If this procedure does not lead to a tiebreaker, the following tiebreaker criteria apply:

- Goal difference in all group matches.
- Greater number of goals scored in all group matches.
- Draw of the organising committee of the championship.

The second round includes all phases from the round of 16 to the final. The two semi-finalists qualify through the direct elimination system. The losing teams of the semifinals play a match for third and fourth place, while the winners play the final match, where the winner gets the title.

If a game is tied after 90 minutes of play, extra time is played in two halves of 15 minutes each, even to the extent of a penalty shoot-out if the result is still tied after this extra time.

== Results ==
Keys

- a.e.t.: after extra time
- p: penalty shoot-out
- awd: awarded result.
- TBD: to be determined.

Ed.	Year	Host	First place game			Third place game			Teams
Ed.	Year	Host	(gold) Champion	Score	(silver) Runner-up	(bronze) Third place	Score	Fourth place	Teams
1	2009	Ivory Coast	DR Congo	2–0	Ghana	Zambia	2–1	Senegal	8
2	2011	Sudan	Tunisia	3–0	Angola	Sudan	1–0	Algeria	16
3	2014	South Africa	Libya	0–0 (4–3 p)	Ghana	Nigeria	1–0	Zimbabwe	16
4	2016	Rwanda	DR Congo	3–0	Mali	Ivory Coast	2–1	Guinea	16
5	2018	Morocco	Morocco	4–0	Nigeria	Sudan	1–1 (4–2 p)	Libya	16
6	2020	Cameroon	Morocco	2–0	Mali	Guinea	2–0	Cameroon	16
7	2022	Algeria	Senegal	0–0 (5–4 p)	Algeria	Madagascar	1–0	Niger	17
8	2024	Kenya; Tanzania; Uganda	Morocco	3–2	Madagascar	Senegal	1–1 (4–2 p)	Sudan	19

== Teams reaching the top four ==
Years shown in bold indicate that the country also hosted an edition of the tournament.

Team	Champions	Runners-up	Third place	Fourth place	Total
Morocco	3 (**2018**, 2020, 2024)	–	–	–	3
DR Congo	2 (2009, 2016)	–	–	–	2
Senegal	1 (2022)	–	1 (2024)	1 (2009)	3
Libya	1 (2014)	–	–	1 (2018)	2
Tunisia	1 (2011)	–	–	–	1
Ghana	–	2 (2009, 2014)	–	–	2
Mali	–	2 (2016, 2020)	–	–	2
Nigeria	–	1 (2018)	1 (2014)	–	2
Madagascar	–	1 (2024)	1 (2022)	–	2
Algeria	-	1 (**2022**)	–	1 (2011)	2
Angola	–	1 (2011)	–	–	1
Sudan	–	–	2 (**2011**, 2018)	1 (2024)	3
Guinea	–	–	1 (2020)	1 (2016)	2
Zambia	–	–	1 (2009)	–	1
Ivory Coast	–	–	1 (2016)	–	1
Zimbabwe	–	–	–	1 (2014)	1
Cameroon	–	–	–	1 (**2020**)	1
Niger	–	–	–	1 (2022)	1

== Comprehensive team results by tournament ==
Countries coloured according to their highest ever tournament achievement. Champion Runner-up Third place Fourth place Quarter-finals Group stage

Team	(Ivory Coast) 2009	(Sudan) 2011	(South Africa) 2014	(Rwanda) 2016	(Morocco) 2018	(Cameroon) 2020	(Algeria) 2022	(Kenya) (Tanzania) (Uganda) 2024	Years
Algeria	•	4th	×	×	•	•	2nd	QF	3
Angola	•	2nd		GS	QF		GS	GS	5
Burkina Faso	•	•	GS		GS	GS	•	GS	4
Burundi	•	•	GS				•	•	1
Cameroon	•	QF	•	QF	GS	4th	GS	•	5
Congo	•	×	GS		QF	QF	GS	GS	5
Central African Republic	•	×	×	×	×	•	•	GS	1
DR Congo	1st	QF	QF	1st	•	QF	GS	GS	7
Equatorial Guinea	×	×			GS		•	••	2
Ethiopia	×	×	GS	GS			GS	•	3
Gabon	•	GS	QF	GS			×	×	3
Ghana	2nd	GS	2nd				QF	•	4
Guinea	•	•		4th	GS	3rd	•	GS	4
Ivory Coast	GS	GS		3rd	GS		QF	•	5
Kenya	•	•	•	•	×	•	×	QF	1
Libya	GS	•	1st	•	4th	GS	GS	×	5
Madagascar							3rd	2nd	2
Mali	•	GS	QF	2nd		2nd	GS	•	5
Mauritania	•	×	GS		GS		QF	GS	4
Morocco	•	•	QF	GS	1st	1st	×	1st	5
Mozambique	•	•	GS				QF	•	2
Namibia	•	•			QF	GS	×	•	2
Niger	•	QF		GS		GS	4th	GS	5
Nigeria	•	•	3rd	GS	2nd	•	•	GS	4
Rwanda	•	GS		QF	GS	QF	•	•	4
Senegal	4th	GS					1st	3rd	4
South Africa	•	QF	GS				•	GS	2
Sudan	•	3rd			3rd		GS	4th	4
Tanzania	GS	•				GS	•	QF	3
Togo	•	•				GS	•	•	1
Tunisia	•	1st	•	QF	×	••	×	••	3
Uganda	•	GS	GS	GS	GS	GS	GS	QF	7
Zambia	3rd	•	•	QF	QF	QF	•	GS	5
Zimbabwe	GS	GS	4th	GS	•	GS	×	•	5
Total	8	16	16	16	16	16	17	19	

Legend

- 1st – Champions
- 2nd – Runners-up
- 3rd – Third place
- 4th – Fourth place
- QF – Quarter-finals
- GS – Group stage
- Q – Qualified for upcoming tournament
- •• — Qualified but withdrew / Disqualified after qualification
- • — Did not qualify
- × — Did not enter / Withdrew / Disqualified
- — Hosts
- — Not affiliated to CAF

== General statistics by tournament ==
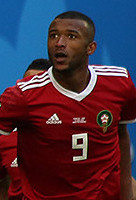
Ayoub El Kaabi has the record for the highest goalscorer in a single edition of the tournament.

Year	Hosts	Champions (titles)	Winning coach	Top scorer(s) (goals)	Most valuable player
2009	Ivory Coast	DR Congo (1)	(Democratic Republic of the Congo) Mutumbile Santos	(Zambia) Given Singuluma (5)	(Democratic Republic of the Congo) Trésor Mputu
2011	Sudan	Tunisia (1)	(Tunisia) Sami Trabelsi	(Algeria) El Arbi Hillel Soudani (3); (South Africa) Myron Shongwe (3); (Sudan) Mudather Karika (3); (Tunisia) Zouheir Dhaouadi (3); (Tunisia) Salema Gasdaoui (3)	(Tunisia) Zouheir Dhaouadi
2014	South Africa	Libya (1)	(Spain) Javier Clemente	(South Africa) Bernard Parker (4)	(Nigeria) Ejike Uzoenyi
2016	Rwanda	DR Congo (2)	(Democratic Republic of the Congo) Florent Ibengé	(Democratic Republic of the Congo) Meschak Elia (4); (Nigeria) Chisom Chikatara (4); (Tunisia) Ahmed Akaïchi (4)	(Democratic Republic of the Congo) Meschak Elia
2018	Morocco	Morocco (1)	(Morocco) Jamal Sellami	(Morocco) Ayoub El Kaabi (9)	(Morocco) Ayoub El Kaabi
2020	Cameroon	Morocco (2)	(Morocco) Hussein Ammouta	(Morocco) Soufiane Rahimi (5)	(Morocco) Soufiane Rahimi
2022	Algeria	Senegal (1)	(Senegal) Pape Thiaw	(Algeria) Aymen Mahious (5)	(Algeria) Houssem Eddine Mrezigue
2024	Kenya; Tanzania; Uganda	Morocco (3)	(Morocco) Tarik Sektioui	(Morocco) Oussama Lamlioui (6)	(Morocco) Mohamed Rabie Hrimat

== Top goalscorers ==
The following players finished with five or more goals in a single edition of the tournament.

Goals	Player(s)	Nation(s)	Year
9	Ayoub El Kaabi	Morocco	2018
6	Oussama Lamlioui	Morocco	2024
5	Aymen Mahious	Algeria	2022
5	Soufiane Rahimi	Morocco	2020
5	Given Singuluma	Zambia	2009

== Hat-tricks ==
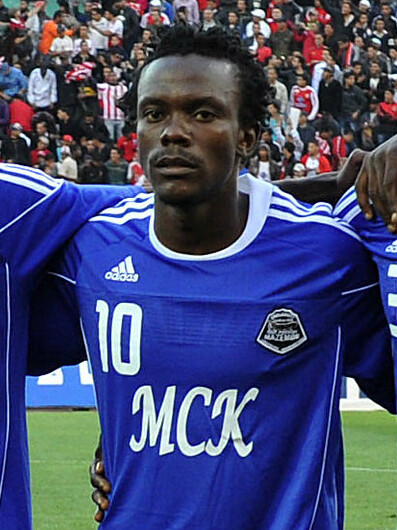
Given Singuluma, the inaugural tournament hat-trick scorer.

A hat-trick is achieved when the same player scores three goals in a match. Listed in chronological order.

Sequence	Player	No. of goals	Time of goals	Representing	Final score	Opponent	Tournament	Round	Date
1.	Given Singuluma	3	36', 49', 50'	Zambia	3–0	Ivory Coast	2009	Group stage	22 February 2009
2.	Chisom Chikatara	3	75', 81', 90'	Nigeria	4–1	Niger	2016	Group stage	18 January 2016
3.	Ayoub El Kaabi	3	27', 65', 68'	Morocco	3–1	Guinea	2018	Group stage	17 January 2018

== See also ==
- List of association football competitions
- Africa Cup of Nations
