= Jérémie Mumbere =

Congolese footballer

Personal information
- Full name: Jérémie Mumbere Mbusa
- Date of birth: 10 June 1991 (age 35)
- Position: Midfielder

Team information
- Current team: AS Vita Club

Senior career*
Years	Team	Apps	(Gls)
–2014	CARA Brazzaville		
2015	Étoile du Congo		
2015–	FC Saint-Éloi Lupopo		
2017–2018	AS Maniema Union		
2018–	AS Vita Club		

International career^{‡}
2019–	DR Congo	4	(0)
- * Club domestic league appearances and goals ‡ National team caps and goals as of 23:17, 26 March 2021 (UTC)

Jérémie Mumbere Mbusa (born 10 June 1991) is a Congolese footballer who plays as a midfielder for AS Vita Club.
