= 2009 African Nations Championship =

Inaugural edition of CHAN

Championnat d'Afrique des nations de football 2009 African Nations Championship; Côte d'Ivoire 2009

Tournament details
- Host country: Ivory Coast
- Dates: 22 February – 8 March
- Teams: 8 (from 1 confederation)
- Venues: 2 (in 2 host cities)

Final positions
- Champions: DR Congo (1st title)
- Runners-up: Ghana
- Third place: Zambia
- Fourth place: Senegal

Tournament statistics
- Matches played: 16
- Goals scored: 30 (1.88 per match)
- Top scorer: (Zambia) Given Singuluma (5 goals)
- Best player: (Democratic Republic of the Congo) Tresor Mputu

The 2009 African Nations Championship, also known as CHAN 2009 for short, was the inaugural edition of the biennial association football tournament organized by CAF featuring national teams consisting of players playing in their respective local leagues. It was held in Ivory Coast from 22 February to 8 March 2009.

== Qualification ==
Thirty countries attempted to qualify for the tournament, with a total of 8 teams qualifying for this inaugural edition, including hosts Ivory Coast.

== Squads ==
Each squad consisted of a total of 28 players.

== Qualified teams ==
Ivory Coast	Host country
Libya	CAF Zone 1 – Northern Zone
Senegal	CAF Zone 2 – Western Zone A
Ghana	CAF Zone 3 – Western Zone B
DR Congo	CAF Zone 4 – Central Zone
Tanzania	CAF Zone 5 – Central Eastern Zone
Zambia	CAF Zone 6 – Southern Zone
Zimbabwe	CAF Zone 6 – Southern Zone

== Draw ==
The draw for the group stage was held in Abidjan on Friday 26 December 2008.

== Venues ==
Abidjan	2009 African Nations Championship is located in Ivory Coast	Bouaké
Stade Félix Houphouët-Boigny	2009 African Nations Championship is located in Ivory Coast	Stade Bouaké
Capacity: 40,000	2009 African Nations Championship is located in Ivory Coast	Capacity: 35,000

== Group stage ==
=== Tie-breaking criteria ===
Where two or more teams end the group stage with the same number of points, their ranking is determined by the following criteria:

1. points earned in the matches between the teams concerned;
2. goal difference in the matches between the teams concerned;
3. number of goals scored in the group matches between the teams concerned;
4. number of away goals scored in the matches between the teams concerned;
5. goal difference in all group matches;
6. number of goals scored in all group matches;
7. Yellow and red cards
8. drawing of lots by the organizing committee.

All times given as local time (UTC+00:00)

Key to colors in group tables
Teams that advanced to the semi-finals

=== Group A ===
Team	Pld	W	D	L	GF	GA	GD	Pts
Zambia	3	1	2	0	4	1	+3	5
Senegal	3	1	2	0	1	0	+1	5
Tanzania	3	1	1	1	2	2	0	4
Ivory Coast	3	0	1	2	0	4	−4	1

22 February 2009
16:00

Ivory Coast	0–3	Zambia
	Report (Archived)	Singuluma 36', 49', 50'

Stade Félix Houphouët-Boigny, Abidjan
Attendance: 35,000
Referee: (Mauritius) Rajindraparsad Seechurn

22 February 2009
19:00

Senegal	1–0	Tanzania
M.B. Traoré 29'	Report (Archived)

Stade Félix Houphouët-Boigny, Abidjan
Referee: (Seychelles) Jean-Claude Lebrosse

25 February 2009
16:00

Zambia	0–0	Senegal
	Report (Archived)

Stade Félix Houphouët-Boigny, Abidjan
Referee: (Morocco) Abdella El Achiri

25 February 2009
19:00

Tanzania	1–0	Ivory Coast
Ngassa 36'	Report (Archived)

Stade Félix Houphouët-Boigny, Abidjan
Referee: (Tunisia) Chokri Saadallah

28 February 2009
16:00

Ivory Coast	0–0	Senegal
	Report (Archived)

Stade Félix Houphouët-Boigny, Abidjan
Attendance: 2,000
Referee: (Malawi) Verson Lwanja

28 February 2009
16:00

Zambia	1–1	Tanzania
Banda 90+4'	Report (Archived)	Nsajigwa 88' (pen.)

Stade Bouaké, Bouaké
Referee: (Niger) Ibrahim Chaibou

=== Group B ===
Team	Pld	W	D	L	GF	GA	GD	Pts
Ghana	3	1	2	0	6	3	+3	5
DR Congo	3	1	1	1	3	4	−1	4
Zimbabwe	3	0	3	0	3	3	0	3
Libya	3	0	2	1	1	3	−2	2

23 February 2009
15:00

Ghana	2–2	Zimbabwe
A. Ayew 44', 67'	Report (Archived)	Karuru 5'; Philip Marufu 36'

Stade Bouaké, Bouaké
Referee: (Malawi) Verson Lwanja

23 February 2009
18:00

DR Congo	2–0	Libya
Kaluyituka 58'; Lofo 67' (pen.)	Report (Archived)

Stade Bouaké, Bouaké
Referee: (Ivory Coast) Desiré Noumandiez Doué

26 February 2009
15:00

Zimbabwe	1–1	DR Congo
Philip Marufu 28'	Report (Archived)	Mputu 21'

Stade Bouaké, Bouaké
Referee: (Niger) Ibrahim Chaibou

26 February 2009
18:00

Libya	1–1	Ghana
Saad 26'	Report (Archived)	Owusu-Ansah 76'

Stade Bouaké, Bouaké
Referee: (Senegal) Cheick Ahmed Tidiane Seck

NB: Ghana coach Milovan Rajevac was sent to the stands in the 82nd minute for unsporting behaviour.

1 March 2009
16:00

Ghana	3–0	DR Congo
Taylor 45+4'; Antwi 68'; Ansah 79'	Report (Archived)

Stade Bouaké, Bouaké
Referee: (Mauritius) Rajindraparsad Seechurn

1 March 2009
16:00

Zimbabwe	0–0	Libya
	Report

Stade Félix Houphouët-Boigny, Abidjan
Referee: (Togo) Kokou Djaoupe

== Knockout phase ==
Semi-finals
4 March – Bouaké
Ghana (pen.)	1 (7)
Senegal	1 (6)
4 March – Abidjan
Zambia	1
DR Congo	2

Final
8 March – Abidjan
Ghana	0
DR Congo	2
Third place
7 March – Abidjan
Senegal	1
Zambia	2

=== Semi-finals ===
4 March 2009
15:00

Ghana	1–1 (a.e.t.)	Senegal
Antwi 31'	Report (Archived)	Sow 35'
Penalties
D. Yeboah (penalty scored); S. Yeboah (penalty scored); Mohamed (penalty scored); Appiah (penalty scored); MacCarthy (penalty scored); Bonsu (penalty scored); Poku (penalty scored)	7–6	(penalty scored) M. Fall; (penalty scored) Diamanka; (penalty scored) Ndiour; (penalty scored) Mame Diallo; (penalty scored) Diouf; (penalty scored) Sidy N'Diaye; (penalty missed) Badiane

Stade Bouaké, Bouaké
Attendance: 25,000
Referee: (Seychelles) Jean-Claude Lebrosse
4 March 2009
19:00

Zambia	1–2	DR Congo
Singuluma 85'	Report (Archived)	Lofo 3'; Kaluyituka 16'

Stade Félix Houphouët-Boigny, Abidjan
Referee: (Morocco) Abdallah El Achiri

=== Third-place play-off ===
7 March 2009
16:00

Senegal	1–2	Zambia
Sow 24'	Report	Bwalya 49'; Singuluma 75'

Stade Félix Houphouët-Boigny, Abidjan
Referee: (Mauritius) Rajindraparsad Seechurn

=== Final ===
8 March 2009
16:00

Ghana	0–2	DR Congo
	Report (Archived)	Kaluyituka 46'; Bedi 74'

Stade Félix Houphouët-Boigny, Abidjan
Attendance: 35,000
Referee: (Ivory Coast) Desiré Noumandiez Doué

2009 African Nations Championship
champions

DR Congo
First title
