= Nigeria national football team results (2010–2019) =

- Win Draw Loss

This is a list of international football games played by the Nigeria national football team from 2010 to 2019.

During the decade, Nigeria played in several international tournaments and friendly matches. In the FIFA World Cup, they placed bottom in Group B in 2010, reached the Round of 16 in 2014, and placed third in Group D in 2018. The team entered the Africa Cup of Nations in 2010 (third place), 2013 (winners) and 2019 (third place). Nigeria also finished in third place at the African Nations Championship in 2014 and as runners-up in 2018.

== 2010 ==
12 January 2010 2010 Africa Cup of Nations	Egypt	3–1	Nigeria	Benguela, Angola
17:00 UTC+1	Moteab 34'; Hassan 54'; Geddo 87'	Report	Obasi 12'	Stadium: Complexo da Sr. da Graça; Attendance: 18,000; Referee: Rajindraparsad Seechurn (Mauritius)

16 January 2010 2010 Africa Cup of Nations	Nigeria	1–0	Benin	Benguela, Angola
17:00 UTC+1	Yakubu 42' (pen.)	Report		Stadium: Complexo da Sr. da Graça; Attendance: 8,000; Referee: Hélder Martins de Carvalho (Angola)

20 January 2010 2010 Africa Cup of Nations	Nigeria	3–0	Mozambique	Lubango, Angola
17:00 UTC+1	Odemwingie 45', 47'; Martins 86'	Report		Stadium: Estádio Alto da Chela; Attendance: 10,000; Referee: Koman Coulibaly (Mali)

25 January 2010 2010 Africa Cup of Nations	Zambia	0–0 (a.e.t.) (4–5 p)	Nigeria	Lubango, Angola
20:30 UTC+1		Report		Stadium: Estádio Alto da Chela; Attendance: 10,000; Referee: Essam Abdel-Fatah (Egypt)
	Penalties
	Chivuta (penalty scored); C. Katongo (penalty scored); Mayuka (penalty scored); Nyrienda (penalty missed); Mweene (penalty scored)		(penalty scored) Mikel; (penalty scored) Martins; (penalty scored) Obinna; (penalty scored) Odemwingie; (penalty scored) Enyeama

28 January 2010 2010 Africa Cup of Nations	Ghana	1–0	Nigeria	Luanda, Angola
16:00 UTC+1	Gyan 21'	Report		Stadium: Estádio 11 de Novembro; Attendance: 7,500; Referee: Daniel Bennett (South Africa)

30 January 2010 2010 Africa Cup of Nations	Nigeria	1–0	Algeria	Benguela, Angola
17:00 UTC+1	Obinna 56'	Report		Stadium: Complexo da Sr. da Graça; Attendance: 12,000; Referee: Badara Diatta (Senegal)

3 March 2010 Friendly	Nigeria	5–2	DR Congo	Abuja, Nigeria
17:30 UTC+1	Utaka 11'; Idehen 28', 65'; Ezimora 31'; Obinna 52'	Report	Bedi 47', 71'	Stadium: Abuja Stadium; Attendance: 5,000

25 May 2010 Friendly	Nigeria	0–0	Saudi Arabia	Wattens, Austria
		Report		Stadium: Alpenstadion

30 May 2010 Friendly	Nigeria	1–1	Colombia	Stadium:mk, Milton Keynes, England
	Lukman 70'	Report	Valdés 22'	Attendance: 0

6 June 2010 Friendly	Nigeria	3–1	North Korea	Tembisa, South Africa
16:00 SAST	Yakubu 17'; Nsofor 62'; Martins 90'	Report; Report	Jong Tae-Se 64'	Stadium: Makhulong Stadium; Attendance: 8,000

12 June 2010 2010 FIFA World Cup	Argentina	1–0	Nigeria	Johannesburg, South Africa
16:00 UTC+2	Heinze 6'	Report		Stadium: Ellis Park Stadium; Attendance: 55,686; Referee: Wolfgang Stark, Germany

17 June 2010 2010 FIFA World Cup	Greece	2–1	Nigeria	Bloemfontein, South Africa
16:00 UTC+2	Salpingidis 44'; Torosidis 71'	Report	Uche 16'	Stadium: Free State Stadium; Attendance: 31,593; Referee: Óscar Ruiz, Colombia

22 June 2010 2010 FIFA World Cup	Nigeria	2–2	South Korea	Moses Mabhida Stadium, Durban
20:30 UTC+2	Uche 12'; Yakubu 69' (pen.)	Report	Lee Jung-Soo 38'; Park Chu-Young 49'	Attendance: 61,874; Referee: Olegario Benquerenca (Portugal)

11 August 2010 Friendly	South Korea	2–1	Nigeria	Suwon World Cup Stadium, Suwon
	Yoon 17'; Choi 41'		Odemwingie 27'

5 September 2010 2012 ACN Qualifying	Nigeria	2–0	Madagascar	Calabar, Nigeria
17:00 CET	Martins 19'; Michael Eneramo 45+1'			Stadium: U.J. Esuene Stadium

10 October 2010 2012 ACN Qualifying	Guinea	1–0	Nigeria	Conakry, Guinea
18:00 UTC+0	Constant 8'			Stadium: Stade du 28 Septembre

== 2011 ==
9 February 2011 Friendly	Nigeria	2–1	Sierra Leone	Teslim Balogun Stadium, Lagos, Nigeria
19:15 WAT	Taiwo 15' (pen.); Ehiosun 45+'	Report	Kabia 89'	Referee: Aguidissou Prestin Benin

27 March 2011 2012 ACN Qualifying	Nigeria	4–0	Ethiopia	Abuja Stadium, Abuja
19:00 WAT	P. Utaka 1', 53'; I. Uche 77', 90'	Report		Referee: Slim Jedidi Tunisia

29 March 2011 Friendly	Nigeria	3–0	Kenya	Abuja Stadium, Abuja
18:30 WAT	Musa 3'; Anichebe 48'; I. Uche 90+'	Report		Referee: Benin

1 June 2011 Friendly	Nigeria	4–1	Argentina	Abuja Stadium, Abuja
20:30 WAT	I. Uche 10', 39'; Obinna 27' (pen.); Emenike 52'	Report	Boselli 90+9' (pen.)	Attendance: 30,000; Referee: Ibrahim Chaibou (Niger)

5 June 2011 2012 ACN Qualifying	Ethiopia	2–2	Nigeria	Addis Ababa Stadium, Addis Ababa
UTC+3	Said 41', 50'	Report	I. Uche 27'; Yobo 86'

4 September 2011 2012 ACN Qualifying	Madagascar	0–2	Nigeria	Mahamasina Stadium, Antananarivo
14:30 UTC+3		Report	Yobo 68'; Obinna 75'

6 September 2011 Friendly	Argentina	3–1	Nigeria	Bangabandhu National Stadium, Dhaka
19:00 UTC+6	Higuaín 24'; Di María 26'; Elderson 66' (o.g.)	Report	Obasi 47'	Attendance: 20,000; Referee: Akbar Bakhshizadeh (Iran)

8 October 2011 2012 ACN Qualifying	Nigeria	2–2	Guinea	Abuja Stadium, Abuja
	Obinna 64'; I. Uche 71'	Report	Bangoura 54'; Diallo 90+'

11 October 2011 Friendly	Ghana	0–0	Nigeria	Vicarage Road, Watford
20:00		Report		Referee: Mark Clattenburg (England)

12 November 2011 Friendly	Nigeria	0–0	Botswana	Samuel Ogbemudia Stadium, Benin City
		Report

15 November 2011 Friendly	Nigeria	2–0	Zambia	Ahmadu Bello Stadium, Kaduna
16:00	K. Uche 9'; I. Uche 90+'	Report

== 2012 ==
11 January 2012 Friendly	Nigeria	0–0	Angola	Abuja Stadium, Abuja, Nigeria
				Referee: Aguidissou Crespin (Benin)

15 February 2012 Friendly	Liberia	0–2	Nigeria	Antoinette Tubman Stadium, Monrovia, Liberia
			Mba 9', 30'	Attendance: 18,000; Referee: Ebenezer Konah (Liberia)

29 February 2012 2013 ACNQ	Rwanda	0–0	Nigeria	Stade Regional de Kigali, Kigali, Rwanda
15:30 CAT		Report		Attendance: 16,000; Referee: Daniel Bennett (South Africa)

12 April 2012 Friendly	Egypt	3–2	Nigeria	Al-Maktoum Stadium, Dubai
20:00 UTC+4	Temsah 25'; Aboutrika 33'; Mekki 90+'	Report	S. Mba 13'; Kalu 42'

23 May 2012 Friendly	Peru	1–0	Nigeria	Estadio Nacional, Lima, Peru
20:00	Guerrero 37'	Report		Referee: Jose Luis Espinel (Ecuador)

3 June 2012 2014 WCQ	Nigeria	1–0	Namibia	U. J. Esuene Stadium, Calabar
	I. Uche 80'	Report		Referee: Khalid Abdel Rahman (Sudan)

9 June 2012 2014 WCQ	Malawi	1–1	Nigeria	Kamazu Stadium, Blantyre
	Banda 90+3'	Report	Egwuekwe 89'	Referee: Rajindraparsad Seechurn (Mauritius)

16 June 2012 2013 ACNQ	Nigeria	2–0	Rwanda	U. J. Esuene Stadium, Calabar
16:00	I. Uche 9'; Musa 56'	Report		Referee: Noumandiez Doué (Ivory Coast)

15 August 2012 Friendly	Niger	0–0	Nigeria	Stade Général Seyni Kountché, Niamey
16:30

8 September 2012 2013 ACNQ	Liberia	2–2	Nigeria	Antoinette Tubman Stadium, Monrovia, Liberia
	Roberts 8'; Oliseh 66'	Report	Igiebor 14'; I. Uche 16'	Attendance: 30,000; Referee: Koman Coulibaly (Mali)

13 October 2012 2013 ACNQ	Nigeria	6–1	Liberia	U. J. Esuene Stadium, Calabar
	Ambrose 1'; Musa 38'; Moses 48', 88'; Mikel 50' (pen.); I. Uche 72'	Report	Gebro (yellow card) 49' (red card) 70'; Wleh 80'	Referee: Daniel Bennett (South Africa)

14 November 2012 Friendly	Venezuela	1–3	Nigeria	Marlins Park, Miami
08:00 EST	Feltscher 69'	Report	Ideye 49'; Igiebor 53'; Onazi 90+'	Attendance: 13,372; Referee: Terry Vaughn (United States)

== 2013 ==
2 January 2013 Catalonia International Trophy	Catalonia	1–1	Nigeria	Estadi Cornellà-El Prat, Barcelona
	Sergio 3' (pen.)	Report	Dike 55'	Attendance: 27,234; Referee: Xavier Estrada Fernández (Spain)

9 January 2013 Friendly	Nigeria	0–0	Cape Verde	Estádio Algarve, Faro, Portugal
20:00		Report		Referee: Hugo Filipe Ferreira (Portugal)

21 January 2013 2013 Africa Cup of Nations	Nigeria	1–1	Burkina Faso	Mbombela Stadium, Nelspruit
20:00	Emenike 23'	Report	Al. Traoré 90+4'	Attendance: 8,500; Referee: Mohamed Benouza (Algeria)

25 January 2013 2013 Africa Cup of Nations	Zambia	1–1	Nigeria	Mbombela Stadium, Nelspruit
17:00	Mweene 85' (pen.)	Report	Emenike 57'	Attendance: 25,000; Referee: Gehad Grisha (Egypt)

29 January 2013 2013 Africa Cup of Nations	Ethiopia	0–2	Nigeria	Royal Bafokeng Stadium, Rustenburg
19:00		Report	Moses 80' (pen.), 90' (pen.)	Attendance: 15,000; Referee: Bouchaïb El Ahrach (Morocco)

3 February 2013 2013 Africa Cup of Nations	Ivory Coast	1–2	Nigeria	Royal Bafokeng Stadium, Rustenburg
17:00	Tioté 50'	Report	Emenike 43'; Mba 78'	Attendance: 25,000; Referee: Djamel Haimoudi (Algeria)

6 February 2013 2013 Africa Cup of Nations	Mali	1–4	Nigeria	Moses Mabhida Stadium, Durban
17:00	C. Diarra 75'	Report	Echiéjilé 25'; Ideye 30'; Emenike 44'; Musa 60'	Attendance: 54,000; Referee: Bakary Gassama (Gambia)

10 February 2013 2013 Africa Cup of Nations	Nigeria	1–0	Burkina Faso	FNB Stadium, Johannesburg
20:30	Mba 40'	Report		Attendance: 85,000; Referee: Djamel Haimoudi (Algeria)

23 March 2013 WCQ	Nigeria	1–1	Kenya	U.J. Esuene Stadium, Calabar
	Oduamadi 90+4'	Report	Kahata 35'	Referee: Joshua Bondo (Botswana)

31 May 2013 Friendly	Mexico	2–2	Nigeria	Reliant Stadium, Houston, United States
	Hernández 21', 70'	Report	Ideye 27' (pen.); Ugochukwu 40'	Attendance: 62,000; Referee: Baldomero Toledo (United States)

5 June 2013 WCQ	Kenya	0–1	Nigeria	Moi International Sports Centre, Nairobi
16:00 UTC+3		Report	Musa 80'	Attendance: 30,000; Referee: Noumandiez Doué (Ivory Coast)

12 June 2013 WCQ	Namibia	1–1	Nigeria	Sam Nujoma Stadium, Windhoek
20:00 UTC+1	Kavendji 77'	Report	Oboabona 82'	Attendance: 9,000; Referee: Mensur Maeruf (Eritrea)

17 June 2013 Confederations Cup	Tahiti	1–6	Nigeria	Estádio Mineirão, Belo Horizonte
16:00	J. Tehau 54'	Report	Vallar 5' (o.g.); Oduamadi 10', 26', 76'; J. Tehau 69' (o.g.); Echiéjilé 80'	Attendance: 20,187; Referee: Joel Aguilar (El Salvador)

20 June 2013 Confederations Cup	Nigeria	1–2	Uruguay	Arena Fonte Nova, Salvador
19:00	Mikel 37'	Report	Lugano 19'; Forlán 51'	Attendance: 26,769; Referee: Björn Kuipers (Netherlands)

23 June 2013 Confederations Cup	Nigeria	0–3	Spain	Estádio Castelão, Fortaleza
16:00		Report	Jordi Alba 3', 88'; Fernando Torres 62'	Attendance: 51,263; Referee: Joel Aguilar (El Salvador)

14 August 2013 Nelson Mandela Challenge	South Africa	0–2	Nigeria	Moses Mabhida Stadium, Durban, South Africa
		Report	Nwofor 49', 68'	Referee: Ruzive Ruzive (Zimbabwe)

7 September 2013 WCQ	Nigeria	2–0	Malawi	U.J. Esuene Stadium, Calabar
16:00 WAT	Emenike 45+1'; Moses 50' (pen.)	Report		Referee: Hamada Nampiandraza (Madagascar)

10 September 2013 Friendly	Nigeria	4–1	Burkina Faso	Ahmadu Bello Stadium, Kaduna
17:00 WAT	Ideye 13', 43'; Ameobi 53'; Emenike 63'	Report	Simpore 78'

13 October 2013 WCQ	Ethiopia	1–2	Nigeria	Addis Ababa Stadium, Addis Ababa
	Assefa 57'	Report	Emenike 67', 90' (pen.)	Attendance: 22,000; Referee: Néant Alioum (Cameroon)

28 October 2013 Friendly	Jordan	1–0	Nigeria	Amman International Stadium, Amman
	Aqel 42' (pen.)	Report

16 November 2013 WCQ	Nigeria	2–0	Ethiopia	U. J. Esuene Stadium, Calabar
	Moses 20' (pen.); Obinna 81'	Report		Referee: Bakary Gassama (Gambia)

18 November 2013 Friendly	Italy	2–2	Nigeria	Craven Cottage, London
19:45 BST	Rossi 12'; Giaccherini 46'	Report	Dike 36'; Ameobi 39'	Attendance: 15,267; Referee: Martin Atkinson (England)

== 2014 ==
4 January 2014 Friendly	Nigeria	2–1	Ethiopia	Abuja, Nigeria
16:00 UTC+1	Edeh 3'; Uzochukwu 30'	Report	Agbim 5' (o.g.)	Stadium: Abuja National Stadium; Attendance: 2,000; Referee: Yakhouba Keita (Guinea)

11 January 2014 2014 African Nations Championship	Mali	2–1	Nigeria	Cape Town, South Africa
21:00 UTC+2	Sissoko 18'; Traoré 50'	Report	Salami 54'	Stadium: Cape Town Stadium; Attendance: 14,000; Referee: Bernard Camille (Seychelles)

15 January 2014 2014 African Nations Championship	Nigeria	4–2	Mozambique	Cape Town, South Africa
20:00 UTC+2	Ede 11'; Ali 13', 54' (pen.); Imenger 88'	Report	Khan 10'; Diogo 20'	Stadium: Cape Town Stadium; Attendance: 18,407; Referee: Aboubacar Mario Bangoura (Guinea)

19 January 2014 2014 African Nations Championship	South Africa	1–3	Nigeria	Cape Town, South Africa
19:00 UTC+2	Parker 81' (pen.)	Report	Uzoenyi 22', 64'; Edeh 32' (pen.)	Stadium: Cape Town Stadium; Attendance: 35,000; Referee: Mohamed Benouza (Algeria)

25 January 2014 2014 African Nations Championship	Morocco	3–4 (a.e.t.)	Nigeria	Cape Town, South Africa
17:00 UTC+2	Moutouali 33', 40'; Iajour 37'	Report	Uzochukwu 49'; Ali 56'; Uzoenyi 90'; Ibrahim 111'	Stadium: Cape Town Stadium; Attendance: 8,000; Referee: Bernard Camille (Seychelles)

29 January 2014 2014 African Nations Championship	Ghana	0–0 (a.e.t.) (4–1 p)	Nigeria	Bloemfontein, South Africa
20:30 UTC+2		Report		Stadium: Free State Stadium; Attendance: 7,000; Referee: Janny Sikazwe (Zambia)
	Penalties
	Akuffu (penalty scored); Annorbaah (penalty scored); Ainooson (penalty scored); Attobrah (penalty scored)		(penalty scored) Uzoenyi; (penalty missed) Kwambe; (penalty missed) Uzochukwu

1 February 2014 2014 African Nations Championship	Zimbabwe	0–1	Nigeria	Cape Town, South Africa
17:00 UTC+2		Report	Obiozor 85'	Stadium: Cape Town Stadium; Attendance: 10,000; Referee: Victor Miguel Gomes (South Africa)

5 March 2014 Friendly	Mexico	0–0	Nigeria	Atlanta, United States
20:30 UTC−4		Report		Stadium: Georgia Dome; Attendance: 68,212; Referee: Wálter Quesada (Costa Rica)

28 May 2014 Friendly	Scotland	2–2	Nigeria	London, England
20:00 UTC±0	Mulgrew 10'; Egwuekwe 52' (o.g.)	Report	Uchebo 41'; Nwofor 90+'	Stadium: Craven Cottage; Attendance: 24,000; Referee: Lee Probert (England)

3 June 2014 Friendly	Nigeria	0–0	Greece	Chester, United States
17:00 UTC−5		Report		Stadium: PPL Park; Attendance: 10,135; Referee: Élmer Bonilla (El Salvador)

7 June 2014 Friendly	United States	2–1	Nigeria	Jacksonville, United States
18:00 UTC−4	Altidore 31', 68'	Report	Moses 86' (pen.)	Stadium: EverBank Field; Attendance: 52,033; Referee: Mark Clattenburg (England)

16 June 2014 2014 FIFA World Cup	Iran	0–0	Nigeria	Curitiba, Brazil
16:00 UTC−3; 20:00 UTC+1		Report		Stadium: Arena da Baixada; Attendance: 39,081; Referee: Carlos Vera (Ecuador)

21 June 2014 2014 FIFA World Cup	Nigeria	1–0	Bosnia and Herzegovina	Cuiabá, Brazil
18:00 UTC−4; 23:00 UTC+1	Odemwingie 29'	Report		Stadium: Arena Pantanal; Attendance: 40,499; Referee: Peter O'Leary (New Zealand)

25 June 2014 2014 FIFA World Cup	Nigeria	2–3	Argentina	Porto Alegre, Brazil
13:00 UTC−3; 17:00 UTC+1	Musa 4', 47'	Report	Messi 3', 45+1'; Rojo 50'	Stadium: Estádio Beira-Rio; Attendance: 43,285; Referee: Nicola Rizzoli (Italy)

30 June 2014 2014 FIFA World Cup	France	2–0	Nigeria	Brasília, Brazil
13:00 UTC−3; 17:00 UTC+1	Pogba 79'; Yobo 90+1' (o.g.)	Report		Stadium: Estádio Nacional Mané Garrincha; Attendance: 67,882; Referee: Mark Geiger (United States)

6 September 2014 2015 ACN qualification	Nigeria	2–3	Congo	Calabar, Nigeria
17:00 UTC+1	Ambrose 13'; Salami 89'	Report (CAF); Report	Oniangue 16'; Bifouma 40', 53' (pen.)	Stadium: U. J. Esuene Stadium; Referee: Joseph Lamptey (Ghana)

10 September 2014 2015 ACN qualification	South Africa	0–0	Nigeria	Cape Town, South Africa
20:05 UTC+2		Report (CAF); Report		Stadium: Cape Town Stadium; Referee: Joshua Bondo (Botswana)

11 October 2014 2015 ACN qualification	Sudan	1–0	Nigeria	Khartoum, Sudan
20:00 UTC+3	Almadina 41'	Report		Stadium: Khartoum Stadium; Referee: Janny Sikazwe (Zambia)

15 October 2014 2015 ACN qualification	Nigeria	3–1	Sudan	Abuja, Nigeria
17:00 UTC+1	Musa 48', 89'; Olanare 65'	Report	Ibrahim 55'	Stadium: Abuja Stadium; Referee: Néant Alioum (Cameroon)

15 November 2014 2015 ACN qualification	Congo	0–2	Nigeria	Pointe-Noire, Republic of the Congo
15:30 UTC+1		Report	Uche 59' (pen.); Olanare 90'	Stadium: Stade Municipal; Referee: Gehad Grisha (Egypt)

19 November 2014 2015 ACN qualification	Nigeria	2–2	South Africa	Uyo, Nigeria
18:00 UTC+1	Aluko 68', 90+4'	Report	Rantie 42', 48'	Stadium: Akwa Ibom Stadium; Referee: Rajindraparsad Seechurn (Mauritius)

== 2015 ==
11 January 2015 Friendly	Nigeria	0–1	Ivory Coast	Abu Dhabi, United Arab Emirates
17:30 GMT		Report	Kalou 84'	Stadium: Zayed Sports City Stadium; Attendance: 75

17 January 2015 Friendly	Nigeria	2–0	Yemen	Dubai, United Arab Emirates
	Udoh 25'; Egwuekwe 64'	Report		Stadium: The Sevens Stadium

25 March 2015 Friendly	Nigeria	0–1	Uganda	Uyo, Nigeria
18:00 UTC+1		Report	Miya 81'	Stadium: Akwa Ibom Stadium; Referee: William Agbovi (Ghana)

29 March 2015 Friendly	South Africa	1–1	Nigeria	Nelspruit, South Africa
15:30 GMT	Zungu 90+3'	Report	Musa 85'	Stadium: Mbombela Stadium; Referee: Janny Sikazwe (Zambia)

13 June 2015 2017 Africa Cup of Nations qualification	Nigeria	2–0; Annulled	Chad	Kaduna, Nigeria
16:00 UTC+1	Salami 62'; Ighalo 79'	Report		Stadium: Ahmadu Bello Stadium; Referee: Ibrahim Mamane (Niger)

5 September 2015 2017 Africa Cup of Nations qualification	Tanzania	0–0	Nigeria	Dar es Salaam, Tanzania
16:30 UTC+3		Report		Stadium: National Stadium, Dar es Salaam; Referee: Louis Hakizimana (Rwanda)

8 September 2015 Friendly	Nigeria	2–0	Niger	Port Harcourt, Nigeria
15:00 UTC+3	Musa 10' (pen.); Simon 85'	Report		Stadium: Adokiye Amiesimaka Stadium; Attendance: 15,000; Referee: D. Laryea

11 October 2015 Friendly	Nigeria	3–0	Cameroon	Brussels (Bruxelles), Belgium
20:00 UTC+3	Ambrose 39'; Simon 61'; Ighalo 88'	Report		Stadium: Edmond Machtens-Stadion; Attendance: 2,000; Referee: J. Lardot

13 November 2015 2018 FIFA World Cup qualification	Swaziland	0–0	Nigeria	Lobamba, Swaziland
17:00 GMT		Report		Stadium: Somhlolo National Stadium; Referee: Akintoye Germain Koole

17 November 2015 2018 FIFA World Cup qualification	Nigeria	2–0	Swaziland	Port Harcourt, Nigeria
15:00 GMT	Simon 51'; Ambrose 87'	Report		Stadium: Adokiye Amiesimaka Stadium; Referee: Akintoye Germain Koole

== 2016 ==
25 March 2016 2017 Africa Cup of Nations qualification	Nigeria	1–1	Egypt	Kaduna, Nigeria
17:00 UTC+1	Oghenekaro 60'	Report	Salah 90'	Stadium: Ahmadu Bello Stadium; Referee: Janny Sikazwe (Zambia)

29 March 2016 2017 Africa Cup of Nations qualification	Egypt	1–0	Nigeria	Alexandria, Egypt
19:00 UTC+2	Sobhi 66'	Report		Stadium: Borg El Arab Stadium; Referee: Daniel Bennett (South Africa)

27 May 2016 Friendly	Nigeria	1–0	Mali	Rouen, France
18:00 GMT	Iheanacho 77'	Report		Stadium: Stade Robert Diochon; Attendance: 500; Referee: R. Buquet (France)

31 May 2016 Friendly	Luxembourg	1–3	Nigeria	Luxembourg City, Luxembourg
18:00 GMT	Thill 90'	Report	Ideye 36'; Iheanacho 69'; Ighalo 90+3'	Stadium: Stade Josy Barthel; Attendance: 1866; Referee: M. Atkinson

3 September 2016 2017 Africa Cup of Nations qualification	Nigeria	1–0	Tanzania	Uyo, Nigeria
17:00 GMT	Iheanacho 78'	Report		Stadium: Godswill Akpabio Stadium; Referee: Mehdi Abid Charef (Algeria)

9 October 2016 2018 FIFA World Cup qualification	Zambia	1–2	Nigeria	Ndola, Zambia
14:30 UTC+2	Mbesuma 71'	Report (FIFA); Report (CAF)	Iwobi 32'; Iheanacho 42'	Stadium: Levy Mwanawasa Stadium; Referee: Gehad Grisha (Egypt)

12 November 2016 2018 FIFA World Cup qualification	Nigeria	3–1	Algeria	Uyo, Nigeria
17:00 UTC+1	Moses 25', 90+2'; Mikel 42'	Report (FIFA); Report (CAF)	Bentaleb 67'	Stadium: Godswill Akpabio Stadium; Referee: Bakary "Papa" Gassama (Gambia)

== 2017 ==
1 September 2017 2018 World Cup qualification	Nigeria	4–0	Cameroon	Uyo, Nigeria
17:00 WAT	Ighalo 29'; Mikel 42'; Moses 55'; Iheanacho 76'	Report		Stadium: Godswill Akpabio Stadium; Attendance: 27,000; Referee: Gehad Grisha (Egypt)

4 September 2017 2018 World Cup qualification	Cameroon	1–1	Nigeria	Yaoundé, Cameroon
18:00 WAT	Aboubakar 75' (pen.)	Report	Simon 30'	Stadium: Stade Ahmadou Ahidjo; Attendance: 38,136; Referee: Bakary Gassama (Gambia)

7 October 2017 2018 World Cup qualification	Nigeria	1–0	Zambia	Uyo, Nigeria
17:00 WAT	Iwobi 73'	Report		Stadium: Godswill Akpabio Stadium; Attendance: 80,000; Referee: Joshua Bondo (Botswana)

10 November 2017 2018 World Cup qualification	Algeria	3–0; Awarded	Nigeria	Constantine, Algeria
20:30 WAT	Brahimi 88' (pen.)	Report	Ogu 63'	Stadium: Mohamed Hamlaoui Stadium; Attendance: 30,000; Referee: Eric Otogo-Castane (Gabon)

14 November 2017 Friendly	Argentina	2–4	Nigeria	Krasnodar, Russia
16:30 (GMT, UTC±0)	Banega 27'; Agüero 36'	Report; Report	Iheanacho 44'; Iwobi 52', 73'; Idowu 54'	Stadium: Krasnodar Stadium; Attendance: 22,739; Referee: Vladislav Bezborodov (Russia)

== 2018 ==
23 March 2018 Friendly	Poland	0–1	Nigeria	Wrocław, Poland
20:45 (CET, UTC+1)		Report	Moses 61' (pen.)	Stadium: Stadion Miejski; Attendance: 41,208; Referee: Michael Oliver (England)

27 March 2018 Friendly	Nigeria	0–2	Serbia	London, England
22:00 (GMT, UTC±0)		Report	Mitrović 68', 81'	Stadium: The Hive Stadium; Attendance: 3,500; Referee: Craig Pawson (England)

28 May 2018 Friendly	Nigeria	1–1	DR Congo	Port Harcourt, Nigeria
17:10 (WAT, UTC+1)	Troost-Ekong 14'	Report	Malango 78' (pen.)	Stadium: Adokiye Amiesimaka Stadium; Attendance: 40,000; Referee: Issaka Afful (Ghana)

2 June 2018 Friendly	England	2–1	Nigeria	London, England
17:15 (BST, UTC+1)	Cahill 7'; Kane 39'	Report	Iwobi 47'	Stadium: Wembley Stadium; Attendance: 70,025; Referee: Marco Guida (Italy)

6 June 2018 Friendly	Nigeria	0–1	Czech Republic	Schwechat, Austria
15:00 (CEST, UTC+2)		Report	Kalas 25'	Stadium: Rudolf-Tonn-Stadion; Attendance: 5,000; Referee: Julian Weinberger (Austria)

16 June 2018 2018 FIFA World Cup	Croatia	2–0	Nigeria	Kaliningrad, Russia
21:00 KALT (UTC+2)	Etebo 32' (o.g.); Modrić 71' (pen.)	Report		Stadium: Kaliningrad Stadium; Attendance: 31,136; Referee: Sandro Ricci (Brazil)

22 June 2018 2018 FIFA World Cup	Nigeria	2–0	Iceland	Volgograd, Russia
18:00 MSK (UTC+3)	Musa 49', 75'	Report		Stadium: Volgograd Arena; Attendance: 40,904; Referee: Matthew Conger (New Zealand)

26 June 2018 2018 FIFA World Cup	Nigeria	1–2	Argentina	Saint Petersburg, Russia
21:00 MSK (UTC+3)	Moses 51' (pen.)	Report	Messi 14'; Rojo 86'	Stadium: Krestovsky Stadium; Attendance: 64,468; Referee: Cüneyt Çakır (Turkey)

8 September 2018 2019 AFCONQ	Seychelles	0–3	Nigeria	Victoria, Seychelles
16:30 SCT (UTC+4)		Report	Musa 15'; Awaziem 34'; Ighalo 57' (pen.)	Stadium: Stade Linité; Referee: Davies Omweno (Kenya)

11 September 2018 Friendly	Liberia	1–2	Nigeria	Paynesville, Liberia
20:00 UTC+0	Sherman 89' (pen.)	Report	Onyekuru 11'; Nwankwo 33'	Stadium: SKD Stadium; Referee: Isaac Montgomery (Liberia)

13 October 2018 2019 AFCONQ	Nigeria	4–0	Libya	Uyo, Nigeria
16:00 WAT (UTC+1)	Ighalo 4' (pen.), 57', 68'; Kalu 89'	Report		Stadium: Godswill Akpabio Stadium; Referee: Jean-Jacques Ndala Ngambo (DR Congo)

16 October 2018 2019 AFCONQ	Libya	2–3	Nigeria	Sfax, Tunisia
19:00 CET (UTC+1)	Zubya 35'; Benali 74'	Report	Ighalo 14', 81'; Musa 17'	Stadium: Stade Taïeb Mhiri; Referee: Joshua Bondo (Botswana)

17 November 2018 2019 AFCONQ	South Africa	1–1	Nigeria	Johannesburg, South Africa
15:00 SAST (UTC+2)	Mothiba 26'	Report	Mkhwanazi 9' (o.g.)	Stadium: FNB Stadium; Referee: Bakary Gassama (Gambia)

20 November 2018 Friendly	Nigeria	0–0	Uganda	Asaba, Nigeria
16:45 WAT (UTC+1)		Report		Stadium: Stephen Keshi Stadium; Referee: Djindo Louis Houngnandande (Benin)

== 2019 ==
22 March 2019 2019 AFCONQ	Nigeria	3–1	Seychelles	Asaba, Nigeria
16:00 WAT (UTC+1)	Ighalo 35' (pen.); Onyekuru 50'; Simon 90+1'	Report	Melanie 41'	Stadium: Stephen Keshi Stadium; Referee: Fabricio Duarte (Cape Verde)

26 March 2019 Friendly	Nigeria	1–0	Egypt	Asaba, Nigeria
18:00 WAT (UTC+1)	Onuachu 1'	Report		Stadium: Stephen Keshi Stadium; Referee: Charles Bulu (Ghana)

8 June 2019 Friendly	Nigeria	0–0	Zimbabwe	Asaba, Nigeria
18:00 WAT (UTC+1)		Report		Stadium: Stephen Keshi Stadium; Attendance: 15,650; Referee: Adissa Abdul Raphiou Ligali (Benin)

16 June 2019 Friendly	Senegal	1–0	Nigeria	Dakar, Senegal
16:45 GMT (UTC±0)	Gueye 18'	Report		Stadium: Stade Léopold Sédar Senghor; Referee: Mahmoud Ashour (Egypt)

22 June 2019 2019 AFCON GS	Nigeria	1–0	Burundi	Alexandria, Egypt
19:00 CAT (UTC+2)	Ighalo 77'	Report		Stadium: Alexandria Stadium; Attendance: 3,192; Referee: Bernard Camille (Seychelles)

26 June 2019 2019 AFCON GS	Nigeria	1–0	Guinea	Alexandria, Egypt
16:30 CAT (UTC+2)	Omeruo 73'	Report		Stadium: Alexandria Stadium; Attendance: 10,388; Referee: Helder Martins de Carvalho (Angola)

30 June 2019 2019 AFCON GS	Madagascar	2–0	Nigeria	Alexandria, Egypt
18:00 CAT (UTC+2)	Nomenjanahary 13'; Andriamatsinoro 53'	Report		Stadium: Alexandria Stadium; Referee: Bakary Gassama (Gambia)

6 July 2019 2019 AFCON R16	Nigeria	3–2	Cameroon	Alexandria, Egypt
18:00 CAT (UTC+2)	Ighalo 19', 63'; Iwobi 66'	Report	Bahoken 41'; N'Jie 44'	Stadium: Alexandria Stadium; Attendance: 10,000; Referee: Joshua Bondo (Botswana)

10 July 2019 2019 AFCON QF	Nigeria	2–1	South Africa	Cairo, Egypt
21:00 CAT (UTC+2)	Chukwueze 27'; Troost-Ekong 89'	Report	Zungu 71'	Stadium: Cairo International Stadium; Attendance: 48,343; Referee: Rédouane Jiyed (Morocco)

14 July 2019 2019 AFCON SF	Algeria	2–1	Nigeria	Cairo, Egypt
21:00 CAT (UTC+2)	Troost-Ekong 40' (o.g.); Mahrez 90+5'	Report	Ighalo 72' (pen.)	Stadium: Cairo International Stadium; Attendance: 49,775; Referee: Bakary Gassama (Gambia)

17 July 2019 2019 AFCON 3rd	Tunisia	0–1	Nigeria	Cairo, Egypt
21:00 CAT (UTC+2)		Report	Ighalo 3'	Stadium: Al Salam Stadium; Referee: Gehad Grisha (Egypt)

10 September 2019 Friendly	Ukraine	2–2	Nigeria	Dnipro, Ukraine
20:30	Zinchenko 78'; Yaremchuk 79'	Report	Aribo 4'; Osimhen 34' (pen.)	Stadium: Dnipro-Arena; Referee: Paolo Valeri (Italy)

13 October 2019 Friendly	Brazil	1–1	Nigeria	Kallang, Singapore
20:00 (UTC+8)	Casemiro 48'	Report	Aribo 35'	Stadium: Singapore National Stadium; Referee: Jansen Foo (Singapore)

13 November 2019 2021 AFCONQ	Nigeria	3–1	Benin	Uyo, Nigeria
17:00 WAT (UTC+1)	Osimhen 45+1' (pen.); Kalu 62'	Report	Sessègnon 3'	Stadium: Godswill Akpabio International Stadium; Referee: Issa Sy (Senegal)

17 November 2019 2021 AFCONQ	Lesotho	2–4	Nigeria	Maseru, Lesotho
18:00 CAT (UTC+2)	Nkoto 11'; Awaziem 90' (o.g.)	Report	Iwobi 26'; Chukwueze 38'; Osimhen 75', 85'	Stadium: Setsoto Stadium; Referee: Joshua Bondo (Botswana)
