= 2016 African Nations Championship qualification =

Tournament details
- Dates: 15 June – 31 October 2015
- Teams: 42 (from 1 confederation)

Tournament statistics
- Matches played: 56
- Goals scored: 131 (2.34 per match)
- Top scorer: (Mozambique) Luís (4 goals)

The 2016 African Nations Championship qualification was a men's football competition which decided the participating teams of the 2016 African Nations Championship. Only national team players who were playing in their country's own domestic league were eligible to compete in the tournament.

A total of sixteen teams qualified to play in the final tournament, including Rwanda who qualified automatically as hosts.

== Teams ==
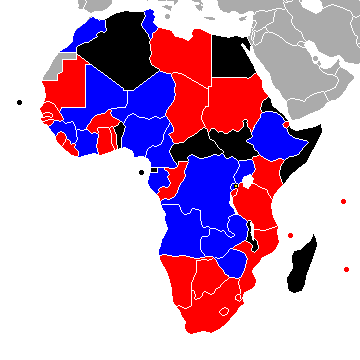
2016 CHAN Qualification Team qualified Team failed to qualify Team did not enter

A total of 42 CAF member national teams entered the qualifying rounds, split into zones according to their regional affiliations.

Zone	Spots	Teams entering qualification	Did not enter
Northern Zone	2 spots	Libya; Morocco; Tunisia	Algeria (disqualified); Egypt
Zone West A	2 spots	Gambia; Guinea; Guinea-Bissau; Liberia; Mali; Mauritania; Senegal; Sierra Leone	Cape Verde
Zone West B	3 spots	Burkina Faso; Ghana; Ivory Coast; Niger; Nigeria; Togo	Benin
Central Zone	3 spots	Cameroon; Central African Republic; Chad; Congo; DR Congo; Gabon	Equatorial Guinea; São Tomé and Príncipe
Central-East Zone	2 spots + Rwanda (hosts)	Burundi; Djibouti; Ethiopia; Kenya; Sudan; Tanzania; Uganda	Eritrea; Somalia; South Sudan
Southern Zone	3 spots	Angola; Botswana; Comoros; Lesotho; Mauritius; Mozambique; Namibia; Seychelles; South Africa; Swaziland; Zambia; Zimbabwe	Madagascar; Malawi
Total	15 spots + hosts	42 teams	

Notes

- Algeria were excluded by the CAF from participating because of their withdrawal against Libya in the 2014 African Nations Championship qualification.

== Format ==
In the Northern Zone, teams played each other on a double round-robin basis. The teams were ranked according to points (3 points for a win, 1 point for a draw, 0 points for a loss). If tied on points, tiebreakers would be applied in the following order:

1. Number of points obtained in games between the teams concerned;
2. Goal difference in games between the teams concerned;
3. Goals scored in games between the teams concerned;
4. Away goals scored in games between the teams concerned;
5. If, after applying criteria 1 to 4 to several teams, two teams still have an equal ranking, criteria 1 to 4 are reapplied exclusively to the matches between the two teams in question to determine their final rankings. If this procedure does not lead to a decision, criteria 6 to 9 apply;
6. Goal difference in all games;
7. Goals scored in all games;
8. Away goals scored in all games;
9. Drawing of lots.

In all other zones, qualification ties were played on a home-and-away two-legged basis. If the aggregate score was tied after the second leg, the away goals rule would be applied, and if still level, the penalty shoot-out would be used to determine the winner (no extra time would be played).

The top two teams in the Northern Zone and the 13 winners of the first round in all other zones qualified for the final tournament.

== Schedule ==
The draw was held on 5 April 2015, 16:00 UTC+2, at the CAF Headquarters in Cairo, Egypt.

The schedule of the qualifying rounds was as follows.

Northern Zone
Matchday	Date
Matchdays 1–3 (Host: Morocco)	15–21 June 2015
Matchdays 4–6 (Host: Tunisia)	19–25 October 2015

All other zones
Round	Matchday	Date
Preliminary round	First leg	19–21 June 2015
Preliminary round	Second leg	3–5 July 2015
First round	First leg	16–18 October 2015
First round	Second leg	23–25 October 2015

== Northern Zone ==
Pos	Team	Pld	W	D	L	GF	GA	GD	Pts	Qualification
1	Morocco	4	3	1	0	11	3	+8	10	2016 African Nations Championship
2	Tunisia	4	1	1	2	4	5	−1	4	2016 African Nations Championship
3	Libya	4	1	0	3	1	8	−7	3	

Source: CAF
Rules for classification: Qualification tiebreakers

Note: Libya played their home matches in Morocco and Tunisia due to security concerns.

15 June 2015
20:00 UTC±0

Morocco	1–1	Tunisia
Hafidi 68'	Report	Aouadhi 39'

Stade Mohamed V, Casablanca
Referee: Ousmane Karembe (Mali)

18 June 2015
22:00 UTC±0

Libya	1–0	Tunisia
Al Khritli 75'	Report

Stade Mohamed V, Casablanca
Referee: Brian Miiro (Uganda)

21 June 2015
22:00 UTC±0

Morocco	3–0	Libya
Iajour 16'; Hafidi 40'; Saâdane 73'	Report

Stade Mohamed V, Casablanca
Referee: El Fatih Wadeed Khaleel (Sudan)

19 October 2015
18:00 UTC+1

Tunisia	1–0	Libya
Bguir 75'	Report

Stade Olympique de Radès, Radès
Referee: Redouane Necib (Algeria)

22 October 2015
18:00 UTC+1

Libya	0–4	Morocco
	Report	Benjelloun 26'; Lembarki 39'; Housni 84'; Ounajem 90+4'

Stade Olympique de Radès, Radès
Referee: Daouda Gueye (Senegal)

25 October 2015
18:00 UTC+1

Tunisia	2–3	Morocco
Machani 28'; Bguir 80'	Report	Khadrouf 20'; Achchakir 70' (pen.); Ounajem 84'

Stade Olympique de Radès, Radès
Referee: Ibrahim Nour El Din (Egypt)

== Zone West A ==
Seeded teams

- Guinea
- Mali
- Mauritania
- Senegal

Unseeded teams

- Gambia
- Guinea-Bissau
- Liberia
- Sierra Leone

=== Preliminary round ===
Team 1	Agg.	Team 2	1st leg	2nd leg
Guinea-Bissau	2–4	Mali	1–1	1–3
Mauritania	4–1	Sierra Leone	2–1	2–0
Guinea	4–2	Liberia	3–1	1–1
Senegal	4–1	Gambia	3–1	1–0

Note: Guinea and Sierra Leone played their home matches in Mali and Mauritania respectively due to the Ebola outbreak (Sierra Leone home match brought forward by a week).

20 June 2015
16:20 UTC±0

Guinea-Bissau	1–1	Mali
Obetchi 5'		Sissoko 19'

Estádio 24 de Setembro, Bissau
5 July 2015
17:00 UTC±0

Mali	3–1	Guinea-Bissau
B. Diarra 33'; Koné 76'; Sissoko 85'		Fati 29'

Stade Modibo Kéïta, Bamako
Referee: Ahmed Sekou Toure (Guinea)

Mali won 4–2 on aggregate.

21 June 2015
22:00 UTC±0

Mauritania	2–1	Sierra Leone
Abeid 5'; Denna 45+1' (pen.)		Tarawallie 85'

Stade Olympique, Nouakchott
Referee: Boubou Traoré (Mali)
27 June 2015
22:00 UTC±0

Sierra Leone	0–2	Mauritania
		Dellahi 34'; Beyguili 36'

Stade Olympique, Nouakchott
Referee: Jerry Yekeh (Liberia)

Mauritania won 4–1 on aggregate.

22 June 2015
17:00 UTC±0

Guinea	3–1	Liberia
S. Camara 8', 38'; Sankhon 62'		Dweh 56'

Stade Modibo Kéïta, Bamako
Referee: Eric Fagla (Togo)
5 July 2015
16:00 UTC±0

Liberia	1–1	Guinea
Vitalis 38'		A. Camara 57'

Antoinette Tubman Stadium, Monrovia
Referee: Raymond Coker (Sierra Leone)

Guinea won 4–2 on aggregate.

20 June 2015
17:00 UTC±0

Senegal	3–1	Gambia
Niang 9', 90+3'; Ba 45'		Krubally 11'

Stade Demba Diop, Dakar
Referee: Juste Zio (Burkina Faso)
4 July 2015
16:30 UTC±0

Gambia	0–1	Senegal
		Ndoye 7'

Independence Stadium, Bakau
Referee: (Tunisia)

Senegal won 4–1 on aggregate.

=== First round ===
Winners qualified for 2016 African Nations Championship.

Team 1	Agg.	Team 2	1st leg	2nd leg
Mali	3–2	Mauritania	2–1	1–1
Guinea	3–3 (a)	Senegal	2–0	1–3

Note: Guinea played their home match in Mali due to the Ebola outbreak.

18 October 2015
16:30 UTC±0

Mali	2–1	Mauritania
Abeid 67' (o.g.); A. Diarra 90+2'		Denna 8' (pen.)

Stade du 26 Mars, Bamako
Referee: Mohamed Benouza (Algeria)
24 October 2015
17:00 UTC±0

Mauritania	1–1	Mali
Niass 45'		Bakayoko 5'

Stade Olympique, Nouakchott
Referee: Manuel Timas Mendes (Cape Verde)

Mali won 3–2 on aggregate.

17 October 2015
17:00 UTC±0

Guinea	2–0	Senegal
A. M. Sylla 6'; A. I. Sylla 24'

Stade du 26 Mars, Bamako
Referee: Denis Dembélé (Ivory Coast)
24 October 2015
17:00 UTC±0

Senegal	3–1	Guinea
Badji 13'; Keita 83', 89'		Bangoura 3'

Stade Demba Diop, Dakar
Referee: Hicham Tiazi (Morocco)

3–3 on aggregate. Guinea won on away goals.

== Zone West B ==
Seeded teams

- Ghana
- Niger
- Nigeria

Unseeded teams

- Burkina Faso
- Ivory Coast
- Togo

=== First round ===
Winners qualified for 2016 African Nations Championship.

Team 1	Agg.	Team 2	1st leg	2nd leg
Ghana	2–2 (a)	Ivory Coast	2–1	0–1
Nigeria	2–0	Burkina Faso	2–0	0–0
Niger	3–1	Togo	2–0	1–1

Note: Second leg of Ivory Coast v Ghana delayed by a week due to presidential elections.

18 October 2015
15:00 UTC±0

Ghana	2–1	Ivory Coast
Fameyeh 45+3', 89'		Sangaré 33'

Baba Yara Stadium, Kumasi
Referee: Juste Zio (Burkina Faso)
30 October 2015
15:30 UTC±0

Ivory Coast	1–0	Ghana
Boua 35'

Stade Robert Champroux, Abidjan
Referee: Abderahamane Kelly (Mauritania)

2–2 on aggregate. Ivory Coast won on away goals.

17 October 2015
16:00 UTC+1

Nigeria	2–0	Burkina Faso
Bature 25'; Salami 76' (pen.)

Adokiye Amiesimaka Stadium, Port Harcourt
Referee: Boubou Traoré (Mali)
25 October 2015
16:00 UTC±0

Burkina Faso	0–0	Nigeria

Stade du 4 Août, Ouagadougou
Referee: Omar Mohamed Ragab (Libya)

Nigeria won 2–0 on aggregate.

17 October 2015
16:00 UTC+1

Niger	2–0	Togo
Garba 11'; Kowa 14'

Stade Général Seyni Kountché, Niamey
25 October 2015
15:30 UTC±0

Togo	1–1	Niger
Akaté 20'		Kowa 18'

Stade de Kégué, Lomé
Referee: Fidel Gomes (Guinea-Bissau)

Niger won 3–1 on aggregate.

== Central Zone ==
Seeded teams

- Cameroon
- DR Congo
- Gabon

Unseeded teams

- Central African Republic
- Chad
- Congo

=== First round ===
Winners qualified for 2016 African Nations Championship.

Team 1	Agg.	Team 2	1st leg	2nd leg
DR Congo	w/o	Central African Republic	—	—
Cameroon	1–0	Congo	0–0	1–0
Chad	1–2	Gabon	0–2	1–0

Note: Central African Republic withdrew. Second leg of Congo v Cameroon postponed to 31 October due to civil unrest.

18 October 2015

DR Congo	Cancelled	Central African Republic

Stade Tata Raphaël, Kinshasa
23 October 2015

Central African Republic	Cancelled	DR Congo

DR Congo won on walkover.

18 October 2015
15:00 UTC+1

Cameroon	0–0	Congo

Stade Ahmadou Ahidjo, Yaoundé
Referee: Denis Batte (Uganda)
31 October 2015
15:30 UTC+1

Congo	0–1	Cameroon
		Wandja 76'

Stade Alphonse Massemba-Débat, Brazzaville
Referee: Yves Roponat Mbourou (Gabon)

Cameroon won 1–0 on aggregate.

18 October 2015
15:30 UTC+1

Chad	0–2	Gabon
		Mba 15'; Mandraut 84'

Stade Omnisports Idriss Mahamat Ouya, N'Djamena
Referee: Lazard Tsiba (Congo)
24 October 2015
15:30 UTC+1

Gabon	0–1	Chad
		Ndiguem 69'

Stade Augustin Monédan de Sibang, Libreville
Referee: Belay Tadesse (Ethiopia)

Gabon won 2–1 on aggregate.

== Central-East Zone ==
- Rwanda qualified automatically for the final tournament as hosts.
- Sudan received a bye to the first round.

Seeded teams

- Burundi
- Ethiopia
- Uganda

Unseeded teams

- Djibouti
- Kenya
- Tanzania

=== Preliminary round ===
Team 1	Agg.	Team 2	1st leg	2nd leg
Tanzania	1–4	Uganda	0–3	1–1
Djibouti	1–4	Burundi	1–2	0–2
Ethiopia	2–0	Kenya	2–0	0–0

20 June 2015
20:00 UTC+3

Tanzania	0–3	Uganda
		Ssekisambu 40', 66'; Miya 90' (pen.)

Amaan Stadium, Zanzibar City
Referee: Hudu Munyemana (Rwanda)
4 July 2015
16:00 UTC+3

Uganda	1–1	Tanzania
Keziron 83'		Bocco 59' (pen.)

Nakivubo Stadium, Kampala
Referee: Djamal Aden Abdi (Djibouti)

Uganda won 4–1 on aggregate.

21 June 2015
21:30 UTC+3

Djibouti	1–2	Burundi
Aboubaker 54'		Bizimana 51'; Nahimana 65'

Stade du Ville, Djibouti
Referee: Hassan Mohamed Hagi (Somalia)
4 July 2015
15:00 UTC+2

Burundi	2–0	Djibouti
Nshimirimana 12', 79'

Prince Louis Rwagasore Stadium, Bujumbura
Referee: (Eritrea)

Burundi won 4–1 on aggregate.

21 June 2015
16:00 UTC+3

Ethiopia	2–0	Kenya
Girma 23'; Panom 77' (pen.)

Bahir Dar Stadium, Bahir Dar
Referee: Mohammed Omar Ragab (Libya)
4 July 2015
16:00 UTC+3

Kenya	0–0	Ethiopia

Nyayo National Stadium, Nairobi
Referee: Adélaïde Ali Mohamed (Comoros)

Ethiopia won 2–0 on aggregate.

=== First round ===
Winners qualified for 2016 African Nations Championship.

Team 1	Agg.	Team 2	1st leg	2nd leg
Uganda	4–0	Sudan	2–0	2–0
Burundi	2–3	Ethiopia	2–0	0–3

17 October 2015
16:00 UTC+3

Uganda	2–0	Sudan
Kalanda 19'; Miya 36'

Nakivubo Stadium, Kampala
Referee: Luelseghed Ghebremichael (Eritrea)
25 October 2015
20:00 UTC+3

Sudan	0–2	Uganda
		Okhuti 43'; Miya 45'

Khartoum Stadium, Khartoum
Referee: Sylvester Kirwa (Kenya)

Uganda won 4–0 on aggregate.

17 October 2015
15:30 UTC+2

Burundi	2–0	Ethiopia
Mavugo 1', 90+2'

Prince Louis Rwagasore Stadium, Bujumbura
Referee: Ali Mohamed Adelaid (Comoros)
25 October 2015
16:00 UTC+3

Ethiopia	3–0	Burundi
Tesfaye 37'; Panom 73', 79' (pen.)

Addis Ababa Stadium, Addis Ababa
Referee: Mahmoud El-Banna (Egypt)

Ethiopia won 3–2 on aggregate.

== Southern Zone ==
Seeded teams

- Angola
- Botswana
- Mozambique
- South Africa
- Zambia
- Zimbabwe

Unseeded teams

- Comoros
- Lesotho
- Mauritius
- Namibia
- Seychelles
- Swaziland

=== Preliminary round ===
Team 1	Agg.	Team 2	1st leg	2nd leg
Zimbabwe	2–0	Comoros	2–0	0–0
Lesotho	1–1 (a)	Botswana	0–0	1–1
Namibia	3–3 (5–6 p)	Zambia	2–1	1–2
Mozambique	9–1	Seychelles	5–1	4–0
South Africa	5–0	Mauritius	3–0	2–0
Swaziland	2–4	Angola	2–2	0–2

21 June 2015
15:00 UTC+2

Zimbabwe	2–0	Comoros
Rusike 10'; Mudehwe 90'

Rufaro Stadium, Harare
Referee: Mbongiseni Fakudze (Swaziland)
4 July 2015
15:00 UTC+3

Comoros	0–0	Zimbabwe

Stade de Beaumer, Moroni
Referee: Samuel Chirindza (Mozambique)

Zimbabwe won 2–0 on aggregate.

21 June 2015
14:50 UTC+2

Lesotho	0–0	Botswana

Setsoto Stadium, Maseru
4 July 2015
15:00 UTC+2

Botswana	1–1	Lesotho
Kgaswane 88'		Brown 81'

Botswana National Stadium, Gaborone
Referee: Jackson Pavaza (Namibia)

1–1 on aggregate. Lesotho won on away goals.

21 June 2015
14:30 UTC+1

Namibia	2–1	Zambia
Stephanus 52'; Nenkavu 63'		Kalengo 15'

Independence Stadium, Windhoek
Referee: Joaquin Esono Ela Eyang (Equatorial Guinea)
4 July 2015
15:00 UTC+2

Zambia	2–1	Namibia
Mbewe 29'; Kalengo 72'		Nenkavu 43'
Penalties
Mtonga (penalty scored); Zimba (penalty missed); Chirwa (penalty scored); Phiri (penalty scored); Mfune (penalty scored); Chepeshi (penalty scored); Kalengo (penalty scored)	6–5	(penalty missed) Isaacks; (penalty scored) Tjetjinda; (penalty scored) Kamatuka; (penalty scored) Keimuine; (penalty scored) Gebhardt; (penalty scored) Iimbondi; (penalty missed) Hoaseb

Nkoloma Stadium, Lusaka
Referee: Osiase Koto (Lesotho)

3–3 on aggregate. Zambia won on penalties.

20 June 2015
15:00 UTC+2

Mozambique	5–1	Seychelles
Luís 32', 42', 49'; Reinildo 35'; Diogo 73'		Waye-Hive 70'

Estádio do Ferroviário, Beira
Referee: Khulasande Qongqo (South Africa)
4 July 2015
16:30 UTC+4

Seychelles	0–4	Mozambique
		Luís 14'; Isac 20'; Gildo 37'; Reinildo 44'

Stade Linité, Victoria
Referee: Andofetra Rakotojaona (Madagascar)

Mozambique won 9–1 on aggregate.

20 June 2015
15:00 UTC+2

South Africa	3–0	Mauritius
Gabuza 26'; Ntshangase 28', 44'

Dobsonville Stadium, Johannesburg
5 July 2015
15:00 UTC+4

Mauritius	0–2	South Africa
		Masango 69'; Letlabika 84'

Stade Anjalay, Belle Vue Maurel
Referee: Wisdom Chewe (Zambia)

South Africa won 5–0 on aggregate.

21 June 2015
15:00 UTC+2

Swaziland	2–2	Angola
Tsabedze 65'; Ndzinisa 83'		Dário 30'; Ary Papel 54'

Somhlolo National Stadium, Lobamba
Referee: Emile Fred (Seychelles)
4 July 2015
15:30 UTC+1

Angola	2–0	Swaziland
Gelson 31', 86'

Estádio 11 de Novembro, Luanda
Referee: Lekgotla Leonard Johannes (Botswana)

Angola won 4–2 on aggregate.

=== First round ===
Winners qualified for 2016 African Nations Championship.

Team 1	Agg.	Team 2	1st leg	2nd leg
Zimbabwe	4–2	Lesotho	3–1	1–1
Zambia	4–1	Mozambique	3–0	1–1
South Africa	2–3	Angola	0–2	2–1

18 October 2015
15:00 UTC+2

Zimbabwe	3–1	Lesotho
Mutuma 48' (pen.), 56'; Phiri 81'		Seturumane 63'

Barbourfields Stadium, Bulawayo
Referee: Sheha Waziri (Tanzania)
25 October 2015
15:00 UTC+2

Lesotho	1–1	Zimbabwe
Mokhahlane 79' (pen.)		Mutuma 35'

Setsoto Stadium, Maseru
Referee: Kalasande Qongo (South Africa)

Zimbabwe won 4–2 on aggregate.

17 October 2015
15:00 UTC+2

Zambia	3–0	Mozambique
Kalengo 77'; Luchanga 80'; Sautu 89'

Levy Mwanawasa Stadium, Ndola
Referee: Hamada Nampiandraza (Madagascar)
25 October 2015
15:00 UTC+2

Mozambique	1–1	Zambia
Hagi 83' (pen.)		Mbewe 26'

Estádio da Machava, Matola
Referee: Norman Matemera (Zimbabwe)

Zambia won 4–1 on aggregate.

17 October 2015
15:00 UTC+2

South Africa	0–2	Angola
		Mateus 54'; Ary Papel 90+2'

Rand Stadium, Johannesburg
Referee: Thierry Nkurunziza (Burundi)
24 October 2015
15:00 UTC+1

Angola	1–2	South Africa
Gelson 43'		Fabrício 29' (o.g.); Lakay 90'

Estádio 11 de Novembro, Luanda
Referee: Mbongisseni Fakudze (Swaziland)

Angola won 3–2 on aggregate.

== Qualified teams ==
The following 16 teams qualified for the final tournament.

Team	Zone	Qualified on	Previous appearances in tournament^{1}
Morocco	Northern Zone	22 October 2015	1 (2014)
Tunisia	Northern Zone	22 October 2015	1 (**2011**)
Mali	Zone West A	24 October 2015	2 (2011, 2014)
Guinea	Zone West A	24 October 2015	0 (debut)
Ivory Coast	Zone West B	30 October 2015	2 (2009, 2011)
Nigeria	Zone West B	25 October 2015	1 (2014)
Niger	Zone West B	25 October 2015	1 (2011)
DR Congo	Central Zone	13 October 2015	3 (**2009**, 2011, 2014)
Cameroon	Central Zone	31 October 2015	1 (2011)
Gabon	Central Zone	24 October 2015	2 (2011, 2014)
Rwanda (hosts)	Central-East Zone	29 January 2011	1 (2011)
Uganda	Central-East Zone	25 October 2015	2 (2011, 2014)
Ethiopia	Central-East Zone	25 October 2015	1 (2014)
Zimbabwe	Southern Zone	25 October 2015	3 (2009, 2011, 2014)
Zambia	Southern Zone	25 October 2015	1 (2009)
Angola	Southern Zone	24 October 2015	1 (2011)

^{1} Bold indicates champion for that year. Italic indicates host for that year.

== Goalscorers ==
4 goals

- (Mozambique) Luís

3 goals

- (Angola) Gelson
- (Ethiopia) Gatoch Panom
- (Uganda) Farouk Miya
- (Zambia) Winston Kalengo
- (Zimbabwe) Rodreck Mutuma

2 goals

- (Angola) Ary Papel
- (Burundi) Laudit Mavugo
- (Burundi) Abbas Nshimirimana
- (Ghana) Joel Fameyeh
- (Guinea) Sékou Amadou Camara
- (Mali) Abdoulaye Sissoko
- (Mauritania) Taghiyoulla Denna
- (Morocco) Abdelilah Hafidi
- (Morocco) Mohamed Ounajem
- (Mozambique) Reinildo
- (Namibia) Benyamin Nenkavu
- (Niger) Koffi Dan Kowa
- (Senegal) Ibrahima Keita
- (Senegal) Mamadou Niang
- (South Africa) Siphelele Ntshangase
- (Tunisia) Saad Bguir
- (Uganda) Erisa Ssekisambu
- (Zambia) Festus Mbewe

1 goal

- (Angola) Dário
- (Angola) Mateus
- (Botswana) Mpho Kgaswane
- (Burundi) Hassan Bizimana
- (Burundi) Shasir Nahimana
- (Cameroon) Ronald Ngah Wandja
- (Chad) Nassar Ndiguem
- (Ethiopia) Aschalew Girma
- (Ethiopia) Seyoum Tesfaye
- (Gabon) Rick Martel Allogho Mba
- (Gabon) Richy Mandraut
- (The Gambia) Salif Krubally
- (Guinea) Alsény Camara Agogo
- (Guinea) Kilé Bangoura
- (Guinea) Ibrahima Sory Sankhon
- (Guinea) Aboubacar Iyanga Sylla
- (Guinea) Aboubacar Mouctar Sylla
- (Guinea-Bissau) Malam Fati
- (Guinea-Bissau) Obetchi
- (Ivory Coast) Koffi Boua
- (Ivory Coast) Ibrahima Sangaré
- (Lesotho) Thabiso Brown
- (Lesotho) Ralekoti Mokhahlane
- (Lesotho) Tsepo Seturumane
- (Liberia) Allison Dweh
- (Liberia) Gobeom Sie Vitalis
- (Libya) Moayed Al Khritli
- (Mali) Moussa Bakayoko
- (Mali) Abdoulaye Diarra
- (Mali) Boubacar Diarra
- (Mali) Ismaël Koné
- (Mauritania) Aly Abeid
- (Mauritania) Boubacar Beyguili
- (Mauritania) Mohamed Yali Dellahi
- (Mauritania) Mamadou Niass
- (Morocco) Abderrahim Achchakir
- (Morocco) Abdessalam Benjelloun
- (Morocco) Rachid Housni
- (Morocco) Mouhcine Iajour
- (Morocco) Abdeladim Khadrouf
- (Morocco) Abdessamad Lembarki
- (Morocco) Marwane Saâdane
- (Mozambique) Diogo
- (Mozambique) Gildo
- (Mozambique) Momed Hagi
- (Mozambique) Isac
- (Namibia) Willy Stephanus
- (Niger) Idrissa Halidou Garba
- (Nigeria) Yaro Bature
- (Nigeria) Gbolahan Salami
- (Senegal) Abdoulaye Ba
- (Senegal) Sylvain Badji
- (Senegal) Mouhamad Waliou Ndoye
- (Seychelles) Gervais Waye-Hive
- (Sierra Leone) Sallieu Tarawallie
- (South Africa) Thamsanqa Gabuza
- (South Africa) Fagrie Lakay
- (South Africa) Wandisile Letlabika
- (South Africa) Mandla Masango
- (Eswatini) Sabelo Ndzinisa
- (Eswatini) Tony Tsabedze
- (Tanzania) Raphael Bocco
- (Togo) Gnama Akaté
- (Tunisia) Karim Aouadhi
- (Tunisia) Ali Machani
- (Uganda) Frank Kalanda
- (Uganda) Kizito Keziron
- (Uganda) Caesar Okhuti
- (Zambia) Conlyde Luchanga
- (Zambia) Spencer Sautu
- (Zimbabwe) Marshall Mudehwe
- (Zimbabwe) Danny Phiri
- (Zimbabwe) Evans Rusike

Own goal

- (Angola) Fabrício (playing against South Africa)
- (Mauritania) Aly Abeid (playing against Mali)
