= 2014 African Nations Championship =

Association football tournament

Orange African Nations Championship; 2014 CHAN

Tournament details
- Host country: South Africa
- Dates: 11 January – 1 February
- Teams: 16 (from 1 confederation)
- Venues: 4 (in 3 host cities)

Final positions
- Champions: Libya (1st title)
- Runners-up: Ghana
- Third place: Nigeria
- Fourth place: Zimbabwe

Tournament statistics
- Matches played: 32
- Goals scored: 73 (2.28 per match)
- Attendance: 296,440 (9,264 per match)
- Top scorer: (South Africa) Bernard Parker (4 goals)
- Best player: (Nigeria) Ejike Uzoenyi

The 2014 African Nations Championship, known as the 2014 CHAN for short and as the Orange African Nations Championship for sponsorship purposes, was the 3rd edition of the biennial association football tournament organized by CAF, featuring national teams consisting players playing in their respective national leagues. Originally supposed to be hosted in Libya, it was held in South Africa from 11 January to 1 February 2014.

Since this edition, all results of the compositions of this competition was computed to calculate the forthcoming FIFA World Rankings.

Hosts South Africa were knocked out of the group stages owing to their national league not pausing during the tournament, as most of their clubs would not release their players. This caused CAF to alter the rules for future editions of the tournament.

== Qualified nations ==
Team	Qualification
North Zone
Libya	Automatic
Morocco	Defeated Tunisia
Zone West A
Mauritania	Defeated Senegal
Mali	Defeated Guinea
Zone West B
Ghana	Automatic
Nigeria	Defeated Ivory Coast
Burkina Faso	Defeated Niger
Central Zone
Congo	Defeated DR Congo
Gabon	Defeated Cameroon
DR Congo	Defeated Cameroon
Central-East Zone
Burundi	Defeated Sudan
Ethiopia	Defeated Rwanda
Uganda	Defeated Tanzania
Southern Zone
South Africa	Hosts
Zimbabwe	Defeated Zambia
Mozambique	Defeated Angola

== Draw ==
The official draw was conducted at the CAF Headquarters on 18 September 2013 in Egypt.

== Venues ==
The host cities were announced on 4 May 2012. Polokwane, Bloemfontein, and Cape Town hosted the tournament. As the CEO of the LOC said: "We are not going to let the success of Orange AFCON 2013 get into our heads and we are not taking anything for granted. We are applying the same formula we used during AFCON as well as the lessons learnt to make sure that Orange CHAN 2014 delivers in accordance with our objectives as well as CAF expectations. We are still going to return to the host cities for another round of visits as the LOC, at the end of August and again in November, together with CAF again. This is how serious we take this competition. We also share the same sentiments expressed by the CAF Vice President and Deputy Secretary General of CAF and we are pleased with what we have seen so far."

Cape Town	2014 African Nations Championship is located in South Africa	Polokwane
Cape Town Stadium	2014 African Nations Championship is located in South Africa	Peter Mokaba Stadium
Capacity: 64,100	2014 African Nations Championship is located in South Africa	Capacity: 41,733
Mangaung (Bloemfontein)	2014 African Nations Championship is located in South Africa	Cape Town
Free State Stadium	2014 African Nations Championship is located in South Africa	Athlone Stadium
Capacity: 40,911	2014 African Nations Championship is located in South Africa	Capacity: 34,000

== Group stage ==
All times are local (UTC+02:00).

Tiebreakers

The teams are ranked according to points (3 points for a win, 1 point for a tie, 0 points for a loss). If tied on points, tiebreakers are applied in the following order:

1. Greater number of points obtained in the matches between the concerned teams;
2. Best Goal difference resulting from the matches between the concerned teams;
3. Goal difference in all group matches;
4. Greatest number of goals scored in all group matches;
5. Fair Play point system in which the number of yellow and red cards are evaluated;
6. Drawing of lots by CAF Organising Committee.

=== Group A ===
Team	Pld	W	D	L	GF	GA	GD	Pts	Status
Mali	3	2	1	0	5	3	+2	7	Advanced to the quarter-finals
Nigeria	3	2	0	1	8	5	+3	6	Advanced to the quarter-finals
South Africa	3	1	1	1	5	5	0	4	Eliminated
Mozambique	3	0	0	3	4	9	−5	0	Eliminated

11 January 2014
18:00

South Africa	3–1	Mozambique
Parker 30' (pen.), 82'; Kekana 58'	Report	Diogo 11'

Cape Town Stadium, Cape Town
Attendance: 26,328
Referee: Gehad Grisha (Egypt)
11 January 2014
21:00

Mali	2–1	Nigeria
Sissoko 18'; Traoré 50'	Report	Salami 54'

Cape Town Stadium, Cape Town
Attendance: 14,000
Referee: Bernard Camille (Seychelles)

15 January 2014
17:00

South Africa	1–1	Mali
Parker 25'	Report	Sidibé 54'

Cape Town Stadium, Cape Town
Attendance: 20,000
Referee: Mal Souley Mohamadou (Cameroon)
15 January 2014
20:00

Nigeria	4–2	Mozambique
Edeh 11'; Ali 13', 54' (pen.); Imenger 88'	Report	Khan 10'; Diogo 20'

Cape Town Stadium, Cape Town
Attendance: 18,407
Referee: Aboubacar Mario Bangoura (Guinea)

19 January 2014
19:00

Nigeria	3–1	South Africa
Uzoenyi 22', 64'; Edeh 32' (pen.)	Report	Parker 81' (pen.)

Cape Town Stadium, Cape Town
Attendance: 35,000
Referee: Mohamed Benouza (Algeria)
19 January 2014
19:00

Mozambique	1–2	Mali
Josemar 38'	Report	Sidibé 48'; Traoré 90+3' (pen.)

Athlone Stadium, Cape Town
Attendance: 1,000
Referee: Mutaz Abdelbasit Khairalla (Sudan)

=== Group B ===
Team	Pld	W	D	L	GF	GA	GD	Pts	Status
Morocco	3	1	2	0	4	2	+2	5	Advanced to the quarter-finals
Zimbabwe	3	1	2	0	1	0	+1	5	Advanced to the quarter-finals
Uganda	3	1	1	1	3	4	−1	4	Eliminated
Burkina Faso	3	0	1	2	2	4	−2	1	Eliminated

12 January 2014
17:00

Zimbabwe	0–0	Morocco
	Report

Athlone Stadium, Cape Town
Attendance: 4,000
Referee: Bamlak Tessema Weyesa (Ethiopia)
12 January 2014
20:00

Uganda	2–1	Burkina Faso
Sentamu 15', 73'	Report	Bayala 87'

Athlone Stadium, Cape Town
Attendance: 2,000
Referee: Ali Lemghaifry (Mauritania)

16 January 2014
17:00

Zimbabwe	0–0	Uganda
	Report

Athlone Stadium, Cape Town
Attendance: 5,000
Referee: Malang Diedhiou (Sénégal)
16 January 2014
20:00

Burkina Faso	1–1	Morocco
Ouédraogo 88'	Report	El Bahri 1'

Athlone Stadium, Cape Town
Attendance: 3,000
Referee: Mahamadou Keita (Mali)

20 January 2014
19:00

Burkina Faso	0–1	Zimbabwe
	Report	Mambare 56'

Athlone Stadium, Cape Town
Attendance: 7,200
Referee: Mohamed Said Kordi (Tunisia)
20 January 2014
19:00

Morocco	3–1	Uganda
Rafik 29'; Iajour 77'; El Ouadi 90+3'	Report	Sentamu 59'

Cape Town Stadium, Cape Town
Attendance: 2,500
Referee: Janny Sikazwe (Zambia)

=== Group C ===
Team	Pld	W	D	L	GF	GA	GD	Pts	Status
Ghana	3	2	1	0	3	1	+2	7	Advanced to the quarter-finals
Libya	3	1	2	0	5	3	+2	5	Advanced to the quarter-finals
Congo	3	1	1	1	3	3	0	4	Eliminated
Ethiopia	3	0	0	3	0	4	−4	0	Eliminated

13 January 2014
17:00

Ghana	1–0	Congo
Annorbaah 34'	Report

Free State Stadium, Mangaung
Attendance: 3,500
Referee: Sylvester Kirwa (Kenya)
13 January 2014
20:00

Libya	2–0	Ethiopia
Abushnaf 4'; Omar 83'	Report

Free State Stadium, Mangaung
Attendance: 16,000
Referee: Janny Sikazwe (Zambia)

17 January 2014
17:00

Ghana	1–1	Libya
Yahaya 6'	Report	Al Badri 73' (pen.)

Free State Stadium, Mangaung
Attendance: 7,000
Referee: Redouane Jiyed (Morocco) replaced by Victor Gomes (South Africa) - 62'
17 January 2014
20:00

Ethiopia	0–1	Congo
	Report	Ndey 78'

Free State Stadium, Mangaung
Attendance: 10,000
Referee: Juste Zio (Burkina Faso)

21 January 2014
19:00

Ethiopia	0–1	Ghana
	Report	Adusei 76' (pen.)

Free State Stadium, Mangaung
Attendance: 6,500
Referee: Gehad Grisha (Egypt)
21 January 2014
19:00

Congo	2–2	Libya
Nkounkou 36'; Binguila 54'	Report	Omar 75'; Omami 90+3'

Peter Mokaba Stadium, Polokwane
Attendance: 5,000
Referee: Mahamadou Keita (Mali)

=== Group D ===
Team	Pld	W	D	L	GF	GA	GD	Pts	Status
Gabon	3	2	1	0	5	2	+3	7	Advanced to the quarter-finals
DR Congo	3	2	0	1	3	2	+1	6	Advanced to the quarter-finals
Burundi	3	1	1	1	4	4	0	4	Eliminated
Mauritania	3	0	0	3	4	8	−4	0	Eliminated

14 January 2014
17:00

DR Congo	1–0	Mauritania
Ngoyi 51'	Report

Peter Mokaba Stadium, Polokwane
Attendance: 6,000
Referee: Mohamed Benouza (Algeria)
14 January 2014
20:00

Gabon	0–0	Burundi
	Report

Peter Mokaba Stadium, Polokwane
Attendance: 5,000
Referee: Victor Gomes (South Africa)

18 January 2014
17:00

DR Congo	0–1	Gabon
	Report	N'Guema 2'

Peter Mokaba Stadium, Polokwane
Attendance: 2,000
Referee: Joseph Lamptey (Ghana)
18 January 2014
20:00

Burundi	3–2	Mauritania
Fiston 11'; Nduwarugira 61'; Ndikumana 90+3'	Report	El Voulany 2'; Denna 70'

Peter Mokaba Stadium, Polokwane
Attendance: 3,000
Referee: Wiish Hagi Yabarow (Somalia)

22 January 2014
19:00

Burundi	1–2	DR Congo
Ndikumana 14'	Report	Mundele 24', 37'

Peter Mokaba Stadium, Polokwane
Attendance: 3,500
Referee: Bamlak Tessema Weyesa (Ethiopia)
22 January 2014
19:00

Mauritania	2–4	Gabon
Bessam 4', 65'	Report	N'Zembi 7'; Appindangoyé 85'; Sokambi 90+2', 90+4'

Free State Stadium, Mangaung
Attendance: 7,000
Referee: Bernard Camille (Seychelles)

== Knockout stage ==
In the knockout stage, if a match was level at the end of normal playing time, extra time was played (two periods of fifteen minutes each) and followed, if necessary, by a penalty shoot-out to determine the winner, except for the third place match, where no extra time was played.

Quarter-finals
Mali	1
Zimbabwe	2
Gabon	1 (2)
Libya (p)	1 (4)
Ghana	1
DR Congo	0
Morocco	3
Nigeria (a.e.t)	4

Semi-finals
Zimbabwe	0 (4)
Libya (p)	0 (5)
Ghana (p)	0 (4)
Nigeria	0 (1)

Final
Libya (p)	0 (4)
Ghana	0 (3)
Third place
Zimbabwe	0
Nigeria	1

=== Quarter-finals ===
25 January 2014
17:00

Morocco	3–4 (a.e.t.)	Nigeria
Moutouali 33', 40'; Iajour 37'	Report	Uzochukwu 49'; Ali 56'; Uzoenyi 90'; Pyagbara 111'

Cape Town Stadium, Cape Town
Attendance: 8,000
Referee: Bernard Camille (Seychelles)

25 January 2014
20:30

Mali	1–2	Zimbabwe
Sinayoko 89'	Report	Sithole 11'; Mahachi 56'

Cape Town Stadium, Cape Town
Attendance: 13,000
Referee: Aboubacar Mario Bangoura (Guinea)

26 January 2014
17:00

Gabon	1–1 (a.e.t.)	Libya
Cousin 73' (pen.)	Report	Omar 50'
Penalties
Engozo'o Avebe (penalty scored); Djissikadié (penalty missed); Cousin (penalty scored); Sokambi (penalty missed)	2–4	(penalty scored) Saleh; (penalty scored) Ghanodi; (penalty scored) Abushnaf; (penalty scored) Fadel

Peter Mokaba Stadium, Polokwane
Attendance: 6,000
Referee: Juste Zio (Burkina Faso)

26 January 2014
20:30

Ghana	1–0	DR Congo
Adusei 68' (pen.)	Report

Free State Stadium, Mangaung
Attendance: 12,000
Referee: Ali Lemghaifry (Mauritania)

=== Semi-finals ===
29 January 2014
17:00

Zimbabwe	0–0 (a.e.t.)	Libya
	Report
Penalties
Chipeta (penalty scored); Phiri (penalty scored); Sithole (penalty missed); Moyo (penalty missed); Zvirekwi (penalty scored); Ncube (penalty missed); Jaure (penalty scored); Ali (penalty missed)	4–5	(penalty scored) Abushnaf; (penalty scored) Al Ghanodi; (penalty missed) Mahfud; (penalty scored) Omami; (penalty missed) Salama; (penalty missed) Sabbou; (penalty scored) Elgadi; (penalty scored) Nashnoush

Free State Stadium, Mangaung
Attendance: 5,000
Referee: Bamlak Tessema Weyesa (Ethiopia)

29 January 2014
20:30

Ghana	0–0 (a.e.t.)	Nigeria
	Report
Penalties
Akuffu (penalty scored); Annorbaah (penalty scored); Ainooson (penalty scored); Attobrah (penalty scored)	4–1	(penalty scored) Uzoenyi; (penalty missed) Kwambe; (penalty missed) Uzochukwu

Free State Stadium, Mangaung
Attendance: 13,000
Referee: Janny Sikazwe (Zambia)

=== Third place match ===
1 February 2014
17:00

Zimbabwe	0–1	Nigeria
	Report	Obiozor 85'

Cape Town Stadium, Cape Town
Attendance: 10,000
Referee: Victor Gomes (South Africa)

=== Final ===
1 February 2014
20:00

Libya	0–0 (a.e.t.)	Ghana
	Report
Penalties
Al Badri (penalty scored); Al Mehdi (penalty scored); Al Maghasi (penalty scored); Al-Gadi (penalty missed); Omar (penalty missed); El Trbi (penalty scored)	4–3	(penalty missed) Akuffu; (penalty missed) Ainooson; (penalty scored) Attobrah; (penalty scored) Saka; (penalty scored) Owusu; (penalty missed) Joshua

Cape Town Stadium, Cape Town
Attendance: 16,505
Referee: Mohamed Benouza (Algeria)

== Awards ==
Golden Boot

- (South Africa) Bernard Parker (4 goals)

Player of the Tournament

- (Nigeria) Ejike Uzoenyi

== Goalscorers ==
4 goals

- (South Africa) Bernard Parker

3 goals

- (Libya) Abdelsalam Omar
- (Nigeria) Rabiu Ali
- (Nigeria) Ejike Uzoenyi
- (Uganda) Yunus Sentamu

2 goals

- (Mauritania) Bessam
- (Burundi) Selemani Ndikumana
- (Democratic Republic of the Congo) Jean-Marc Makusu Mundele
- (Gabon) Bonaventure Sokambi
- (Ghana) Kwabena Adusei
- (Mali) Ibourahima Sidibé
- (Morocco) Mouhcine Iajour
- (Morocco) Mouhcine Moutouali
- (Mozambique) Diogo António Alberto
- (Nigeria) Ifeanyi Edeh
- (Ghana) Theophilus Annorbaah

1 goal

- (Burkina Faso) Cyrille Bayala
- (Burkina Faso) Bassirou Ouédraogo
- (Burundi) Fiston Abdul Razak
- (Burundi) Christophe Nduwarugira
- (Republic of the Congo) Hardy Binguila
- (Republic of the Congo) Rudy Ndey
- (Republic of the Congo) Moise Nkounkou
- (Democratic Republic of the Congo) Emomo Eddy Ngoyi
- (Gabon) Aaron Appindangoyé
- (Gabon) Erwin N'Guema
- (Gabon) Duval N'Zembi
- (Gabon) Daniel Cousin
- (Ghana) Mustapha Yahaya
- (Libya) Elmutasem Abushnaf
- (Libya) Faisal Al Badri
- (Libya) Abdelrahman Ramadan Fetori
- (Mali) Abdoulaye Sissoko
- (Mali) Adama Traore
- (Mali) Idrissa Traoré
- (Mali) Hamidou Sinayoko
- (Mauritania) Taghiyoulla Denna
- (Mauritania) Ely Samba Voulany
- (Morocco) Brahim El Bahri
- (Morocco) Abdessamad Rafik
- (Morocco) Abdelkabir El Ouadi
- (Mozambique) Dario Khan
- (Mozambique) Josemar Tiago Machaisse
- (Nigeria) Christian Pyagbara
- (Nigeria) Barnabas Imenger Jr.
- (Nigeria) Chinonso Christian Obiozor
- (Nigeria) Gbolahan Salami
- (Nigeria) Uzochukwu Ugonna
- (South Africa) Hlompho Kekana
- (Zimbabwe) Masimba Mambare
- (Zimbabwe) Simba Sithole
- (Zimbabwe) Kudakwashe Mahachi

== Prize money ==
The winner of this edition of the tournament pocketed US$ 750,000 while the runner-up got US$ 400,000. The CAF revealed the prize money ahead of the knock-out phase of the competition.

A total of 16 national shared $3.2 million, the rest of the prizes are as follows.

Description	USD	Total
Winner	750,000	750,000
Runner-up	400,000	400,000
Losing semi-finalists	250,000	500,000
Losing quarter-finalists	175,000	700,000
3rd in group	125,000	500,000
4th in group	100,000	400,000
Total		3,250,000
