= Siphelele =

Siphelele is a South African given name. Notable people with the name include:

- Siphelele Gasa (born 1984), South African cricket umpire
- Siphelele Luthuli (born 1995), South African soccer player
- Siphelele Mthembu (born 1987), South African football striker
- Siphelele Ntshangase (born 1993), South African football player
