= Bassirou Ouédraogo =

Burkinabe footballer (born 1992)

Personal information
- Date of birth: 31 December 1992 (age 33)
- Place of birth: Bobo-Dioulasso, Burkina Faso
- Position: Forward

Senior career*
| Years | Team | Apps | (Gls) |
| 2012–2013 | ASFA Yennenga | | |
| 2013–2016 | CF Mounana | | |
| 2016–2020 | Horoya AC | | |

International career
| 2012–2014 | Burkina Faso | 6 | (1) |
- * Club domestic league appearances and goals

Bassirou Ouédraogo (born 31 December 1992) is a Burkinabe former professional footballer who played as a forward. He made six appearances scoring one goal for the Burkina Faso national team.

== International career ==
In January 2014, coach Brama Traore, invited him to be a part of the Burkina Faso squad for the 2014 African Nations Championship. The team was eliminated in the group stages after losing to Uganda and Zimbabwe and then drawing with Morocco.

== Career statistics ==
Scores and results list Burkina Faso's goal tally first.

| No | Date | Venue | Opponent | Score | Result | Competition |
|---|---|---|---|---|---|---|
| 1. | 16 January 2014 | Athlone Stadium, Cape Town, South Africa | Morocco | 1–1 | 1–1 | 2014 African Nations Championship |
