= Abdelrahman Al-Omami =

Libyan footballer (born 1984)

Abdelrahman Ramadan Fetori
Personal information
- Date of birth: 2 July 1984 (age 42)
- Place of birth: Libya
- Position: Defender

Senior career*
Years	Team	Apps	(Gls)
2013–2014	Al-Ahly SC		
2015	Al-Ahly SC		

International career^{‡}
2011–2016	Libya	18	(2)
Medal record
Men's football
Representing Libya
African Nations Championship
Winner	2014 South Africa
- * Club domestic league appearances and goals as of 17:28, 4 December 2017 (UTC) ‡ National team caps and goals as of 17:28, 4 December 2017 (UTC)

Abdelrahman Ramadan Fetori (born 2 July 1984) is a Libyan footballer.

== Honours ==
Libya

- African Nations Championship: 2014
