= Obetche =

Bissau-Guinean footballer

Personal information
- Full name: Obed Raimundo Lopes Da Costa
- Date of birth: 15 October 1995 (age 31)
- Place of birth: Bissau, Guinea-Bissau
- Height: 1.70 m (5 ft 7 in)
- Position: Defender

Senior career*
Years	Team	Apps	(Gls)
2011–2018	Sport Bissau e Benfica		
2018–	SC de Bissau		

International career^{‡}
2015–	Guinea-Bissau	5	(1)
- * Club domestic league appearances and goals ‡ National team caps and goals as of 8 December 2020

Obed Raimundo Lopes Da Costa (born 15 October 1995), commonly known as Obetche or Obetchi, is a Bissau-Guinean footballer, who plays as a defender for the Guinea-Bissau national football team.

== International career ==
Obetchi made his international debut for Guinea-Bissau on 20 June 2015, scoring in the 1–1 draw against Mali.

== Career statistics ==
=== International ===
As of matches played 16 June 2020.

National team	Year	Apps	Goals
Guinea-Bissau	2015	1	1
Guinea-Bissau	2016	0	0
Guinea-Bissau	2017	2	0
Guinea-Bissau	2018	0	0
Guinea-Bissau	2019	2	0
Total		5	1

=== International goals ===
Scores and results list Guinea-Bissau's goal tally first.

No	Date	Venue	Opponent	Score	Result	Competition
1.	25 June 2015	Estádio 24 de Setembro, Bissau, Guinea-Bissau	Mali	1–0	1–1	2016 African Nations Championship qualification
