= Ibourahima Sidibé =

Malian footballer

Personal information
- Full name: Ibourahima Sidibe
- Date of birth: 27 December 1992 (age 33)
- Place of birth: Mali
- Position: Midfielder

Senior career*
Years	Team	Apps	(Gls)
–2013	Djoliba		
2013–2014	Real Bamako	62	(8)
2014–2017	MAS Fez	42	(3)
2017–2019	FUS Rabat	11	(0)
2018–2019	→ Kawkab Marrakech (loan)	4	(0)
2019–2021	Real Bamako		
2021–2022	Al-Safa		

International career^{‡}
2014–	Mali	13	(2)
- * Club domestic league appearances and goals as of 00:10, 14 July 2019 (UTC) ‡ National team caps and goals as of 14:25, 13 March 2022 (UTC)

Ibourahima Sidibé is a Malian professional footballer who plays as a midfielder.

== International career ==
In January 2014, coach Djibril Dramé, invited him to be a part of the Mali squad for the 2014 African Nations Championship. He helped the team to the quarter finals where they lost to Zimbabwe by two goals to one.
