= Aschalew Girma =

Ethiopian footballer

Personal information
- Full name: Aschalew Girma
- Date of birth: 11 September 1991 (age 35)
- Place of birth: Bale Robe, Ethiopia
- Position: Forward

Team information
- Current team: Dire Dawa City
- Number: 17

International career^{‡}
Years	Team	Apps	(Gls)
2015–2019	Ethiopia	13	(2)
- ‡ National team caps and goals as of 16:29, 15 October 2019 (UTC)

Aschalew Girma (born 11 September 1991) is an Ethiopian professional footballer who plays as a forward for Ethiopian Premier League club Dire Dawa City.

== International career ==
=== International goals ===
Scores and results list Ethiopia's goal tally first.

No.	Date	Venue	Opponent	Score	Result	Competition
1.	21 June 2015	Bahir Dar Stadium, Bahir Dar, Ethiopia	Kenya	1–0	2–0	2016 African Nations Championship qualification
2.	5 November 2017	Addis Ababa Stadium, Addis Ababa, Ethiopia	Rwanda	1–0	2–3	2018 African Nations Championship qualification
