= Abdelsalam Elfaitory =

Libyan footballer (born 1993)

Personal information
- Full name: Abdelsalam Faraj Omar Elfaitory
- Date of birth: 22 July 1993 (age 33)
- Place of birth: Libya
- Height: 1.81 m (5 ft 11 1/2 in)
- Position: Forward

Team information
- Current team: Al-Hilal

Youth career
- Al-Hilal

Senior career*
| Years | Team | Apps | (Gls) |
| 2011– | Al-Hilal | - | |
| 2015–2016 | → Zakho (loan) | - | (3) |

International career
| 2013–2018 | Libya | 22 | (3) |
Medal record
Men's football
Representing Libya
African Nations Championship
| Winner | 2014 South Africa |
- * Club domestic league appearances and goals as of 16 August 2014

Abdelsalam Faraj Omar Elfaitory (born 22 July 1993), also spelled as Abdesalam Farag Omar Elfeitouri, is a Libyan footballer who plays for Al-Hilal as a striker.

== International career ==
Elfaitory played his first international game with the senior national team on 7 June 2013 against DR Congo (0–0), where came in as a substitute for Éamon Zayed in the 62nd minute.

== Career statistics ==
=== International ===
Appearances and goals by national team and year
| National team | Year | Apps | Goals |
|---|---|---|---|
| Libya | 2013 | 8 | 0 |
| Libya | 2014 | 5 | 3 |
| Libya | 2016 | 1 | 0 |
| Libya | 2017 | 2 | 0 |
| Libya | 2018 | 6 | 0 |
| Total | | 22 | 3 |

Scores and results list Libya's goal tally first, score column indicates score after each Elfaitory goal.

List of international goals scored by Abdelsalam Elfaitory
| No. | Date | Venue | Opponent | Score | Result | Competition | Ref. |
|---|---|---|---|---|---|---|---|
| 1 | 13 January 2014 | Free State Stadium, Bloemfontein, South Africa | Ethiopia | 2–0 | 2–0 | 2014 African Nations Championship | |
| 2 | 21 January 2014 | Peter Mokaba Stadium, Polokwane, South Africa | Congo | 1–2 | 2–2 | 2014 African Nations Championship | |
| 3 | 26 January 2014 | Peter Mokaba Stadium, Polokwane, South Africa | Gabon | 1–0 | 1–1 | 2014 African Nations Championship | |

== Honours ==
Libya

- African Nations Championship: 2014
