= Kwabena Adusei =

Ghanaian footballer

Personal information
- Full name: Eric Kwabena Adusei
- Date of birth: 3 June 1987 (age 39)
- Position: Centre-back

Team information
- Current team: Mpumalanga Black Aces

Youth career
- Okwawu United

Senior career*
Years	Team	Apps	(Gls)
2007	Tema Youth		
2008–2010	Kessben		
2010–2012	Medeama		
2012–2014	Asante Kotoko		
2014–	Mpumalanga Black Aces		

International career
2013-2014	Ghana	6	(2)
- * Club domestic league appearances and goals

Kwabena Adusei (born 3 June 1987) is a Ghanaian professional footballer who currently plays for Mpumalanga Black Aces in the Premier Soccer League.

== Career ==
Kwabena Adusei has played for several Ghanaian teams including Asante Kotoko as a defender. On 30 May 2014, it was announced that he joined the South African top-flight side Mpumalanga Black Aces, along with Zimbabwean midfielder Peter Moyo. The centre-back however vehemently denied knowledge of the club in an interview with Footy-Ghana.com hours later. The South African club later had to pull their claim off their official website. Adusei is currently under contract with Ghanaian Champions Asante Kotoko SC. In August 2014 he signed with Mpumalanga Black Aces.

== International career ==
In November 2013, coach Maxwell Konadu invited him to be a part of the Ghana squad for the 2013 WAFU Nations Cup. He helped the team to a first-place finish after Ghana beat Senegal by three goals to one.

== International goals ==
Scores and results list Ghana's goal tally first.

#	Date	Venue	Opponent	Score	Result	Competition
1.	21 January 2014	Free State Stadium, Mangaung, South Africa	Ethiopia	1–0	1–0	2014 African Nations Championship
2.	26 January 2014	Free State Stadium, Mangaung, South Africa	DR Congo	1–0	1–0	2014 African Nations Championship

== Honours ==
=== Club ===
Asante Kotoko

- Ghanaian Premier League: 2012–13
