= Elmutasem Abushnaf =

Libyan footballer (born 1991)

Personal information
- Date of birth: 14 November 1991 (age 34)
- Place of birth: Libya
- Height: 1.94 m (6 ft 4 in)
- Position: Forward

Team information
- Current team: Rapide Oued Zem

Senior career*
Years	Team	Apps	(Gls)
2010–2012	Al-Wahda Tripoli		
2012–2013	ES Zarzis	7	(0)
2013–2014	Al-Wahda Tripoli		
2014–2016	Al-Ittihad Tripoli		
2017–2019	Al-Madina		
2020–	Rapide Oued Zem	6	(0)

International career^{‡}
2014–	Libya	15	(2)
Medal record
Men's football
Representing Libya
African Nations Championship
Winner	2014 South Africa
- * Club domestic league appearances and goals ‡ National team caps and goals as of 20:40, 23 September 2020 (UTC)

Elmutasem Abushnaf also known as Elmotassem Aboshnaf (born 14 November 1991) is a Libyan footballer who plays as a forward for Rapide Oued Zem.

== International career ==
=== International goals ===
Scores and results list Libya's goal tally first.

No	Date	Venue	Opponent	Score	Result	Competition
1.	13 January 2014	Free State Stadium, Bloemfontein, South Africa	Ethiopia	1–0	2–0	2014 African Nations Championship
2.	23 January 2018	Stade Ibn Batouta, Tangier, Morocco	Rwanda	1–0	1–0	2018 African Nations Championship

== Honours ==
Libya

- African Nations Championship: 2014
