= Taghiyoulla Denna =

Mauritanian association football player

Personal information
- Full name: Mohamed Taghiyoullah Abderrahmane Denna
- Date of birth: 15 June 1986 (age 40)
- Place of birth: Nouadhibou, Mauritania
- Height: 1.84 m (6 ft 0 in)
- Positions: Centre back; defensive midfielder

Team information
- Current team: ASC Tevragh-Zeina

Youth career
- 2004–2005: SNIM Nouadhibou

Senior career*
Years	Team	Apps	(Gls)
2005−2009	SNIM Nouadhibou	?	(?)
2010–2011	CF Cansado Nouadhibou	?	(?)
2011–2014	FC Nouadhibou	?	(?)
2014–	ASC Tevragh-Zeina	?	(?)

International career^{‡}
2008–	Mauritania	31	(5)
- * Club domestic league appearances and goals as of 28 October 2015 ‡ National team caps and goals as of 24 Feb 2020

Mohamed Taghiyoullah Abderrahmane Denna (born 15 June 1986), known as Taghiyoulla Denna, is Mauritanian professional footballer who plays as a defensive midfielder and defender for ASC Tevragh-Zeina in the Mauritanean Premier League.

== International career ==
=== International goals ===
Scores and results list Mauritania's goal tally first.

Goal	Date	Venue	Opponent	Score	Result	Competition
1.	20 July 2013	Stade Olympique, Nouakchott, Mauritania	Senegal	2–0	2–0	2014 African Nations Championship qualification
2.	18 January 2014	Peter Mokaba Stadium, Polokwane, South Africa	Burundi	2–2	2–3	2014 African Nations Championship
3.	7 June 2015	Stade Olympique, Nouakchott, Mauritania	Senegal	1–0	1-0	Friendly
4.	21 June 2015	Stade Olympique, Nouakchott, Mauritania	Sierra Leone	2–0	2–1	2016 African Nations Championship qualification
5.	18 October 2015	Stade du 26 Mars, Bamako, Mali	Mali	1–0	1–2	2016 African Nations Championship qualification
