= Allison Dweh =

Liberian footballer

Personal information
- Date of birth: 14 April 1990 (age 36)
- Place of birth: Monrovia, Liberia
- Height: 1.87 m (6 ft 2 in)
- Position: Forward

Team information
- Current team: Watanga FC

Senior career*
Years	Team	Apps	(Gls)
2007–2008	NPA Anchors Monrovia		(26)
2008–2010	FC AK		
2010–2011	Invincible Eleven		
2011–2012	Palmeiras B		
2012	União São João	4	(1)
2012–2013	Rio Claro		
2012	→ Ferroviária (loan)		
2013–2015	Thika United		
2015	Aries FC		
2015–2016	Al Nabi Sheet Club	3	(0)
2016–	Watanga FC		

International career^{‡}
2015–	Liberia	2	(1)
- * Club domestic league appearances and goals as of 12:37, 13 April 2017 (UTC) ‡ National team caps and goals as of 19 April 2016

Allison Dweh (born 14 March 1990), also known as Dweh Allison, is a Liberian footballer who plays for Watanga FC as a forward. He has also played for the Liberia national team.

== Club career ==
Dweh spent his early career in Liberia, playing for local sides in Monrovia.

In 2011, he was signed by Palmeiras to play for their B team, becoming the first Liberian footballer to play in Brazil.

== International career ==
Dweh made his international debut for the Liberia national football team on 22 June 2015, in a 3-1 loss to Guinea, in which he scored his team's goal.

=== International goals ===
Scores and results list Liberia's goal tally first.

No	Date	Venue	Opponent	Score	Result	Competition
1.	22 June 2015	Stade Modibo Kéïta, Bamako, Mali	Guinea	1–2	1–3	2016 African Nations Championship qualification
