= Rodreck Mutuma =

Zimbabwean footballer (born 1988)

Personal information
- Date of birth: 5 April 1988 (age 38)
- Place of birth: Mvuma, Zimbabwe
- Height: 1.90 m (6 ft 3 in)
- Position: Striker

Team information
- Current team: Saint-Éloi Lupopo

Senior career*
Years	Team	Apps	(Gls)
2010–2012	Dynamos		
2013–2014	Bloemfontein Celtic	14	(2)
2014	Dynamos		
2015–2017	CAPS United		
2017	Highlanders		
2017	Yadah Stars		
2018	Chegutu Pirates		
2018	Nichrut		
2019–	Saint-Éloi Lupopo		

International career^{‡}
2012–2016	Zimbabwe	8	(3)
- * Club domestic league appearances and goals as of 15 November 2020 ‡ National team caps and goals as of 15 November 2020

Rodreck Mutuma (born 5 April 1988) is a Zimbabwean footballer currently playing with Saint-Éloi Lupopo in the Linafoot. He also plays for the Zimbabwe national team.

Rodi, born in Mvuma. At Athens mine compound where he grew up. Early education at Njerere primary school and Leopold Takawira high school.

== Club ==
Mutuma started his career with Zimbabwe Premier Soccer League side Dynamos in 2011. He stayed with Dynamos until 2013, when he joined South African Premier Soccer League club Bloemfontein Celtic. He made 14 appearances and scored two goals over two seasons for Bloem Celtic. In April 2014, it was claimed that Mutuma had rejoined former club Dynamos on a one-year contract after Bloem Celtic ended his contract. However, it was revealed in May that the South African club hadn't officially released him and therefore he couldn't be signed as a free agent for Dynamos.

Mutuma had a trial with Moroka Swallows in June but failed to win a contract. He subsequently rejoined Dynamos in Zimbabwe after his situation with Bloem Celtic was cleared by FIFA. He remained with Dynamos until 31 December 2014 when he left following the expiration of his contract. Two months later, Mutuma agreed to join CAPS United on a two-year contract. However, in May 2015 Mutuma was again on the move as he quit CAPS United, citing unpaid wages and bonuses. He then joined Dynamos for the third time in his career on 11 July.

== International ==
Mutuma has received 7 caps for the Zimbabwe national team. His debut came in 2013 in a 2014 FIFA World Cup qualifier against Egypt, and he has gone on to make six more appearances for Zimbabwe. He scored his first and second international goal in a 2016 African Nations Championship qualifier first leg against Lesotho on 18 October 2015. In the second leg, seven days later, Mutuma scored his third international goal.

== Career statistics ==
=== International ===
As of 19 June 2016.

National team	Year	Apps	Goals
Zimbabwe	2013	2	0
Zimbabwe	2014	0	0
Zimbabwe	2015	2	3
Zimbabwe	2016	3	0
Total		7	3

=== International goals ===
As of 19 June 2016. Scores and results list Zimbabwe's goal tally first.

Goal	Date	Venue	Opponent	Score	Result	Competition
1	18 October 2015	Barbourfields Stadium, Bulawayo, Zimbabwe	Lesotho	1–0	3–1	2016 African Nations Championship qualification
2	18 October 2015	Barbourfields Stadium, Bulawayo, Zimbabwe	Lesotho	2–0	3–1	2016 African Nations Championship qualification
3	25 October 2015	Setsoto Stadium, Maseru, Lesotho	Lesotho	1–0	1–1	2016 African Nations Championship qualification

== Honours ==
=== Club ===
Dynamos

- Zimbabwe Premier Soccer League (3): 2011, 2012, 2014,
