= Peter Moyo =

Zimbabwean footballer (born 1988)

Personal information
- Date of birth: 8 July 1988 (age 38)
- Place of birth: Bulawayo, Zimbabwe
- Position: Midfielder

Team information
- Current team: Harare City

Youth career
- 2006: Quelaton

Senior career*
Years	Team	Apps	(Gls)
2012–2014	Highlanders		
2014	Mpumalanga Black Aces	0	(0)
2014–2017	Witbank Spurs	13	(0)
2017–2018	How Mine		
2018–2019	CAPS United		
2019–	Harare City		

International career
2012–2014	Zimbabwe	14	(1)
- * Club domestic league appearances and goals as of 23 June 2016

Peter "Rio" Moyo (born 8 May 1988) is a Zimbabwean professional footballer, who plays as a midfielder for Harare City.

== Career ==
=== Club ===
He started his playing career at the local team Quelaton and earned his first international cap when he played for Highlanders in the Zimbabwe Premier Soccer League. On 30 May 2014, it was announced that he had signed with Premier Soccer League side Mpumalanga Black Aces in South Africa, along with Ghanaian centre-back Kwabena Adusei. However, Moyo left the Black Aces in December 2014 after failing to appear for the club in any competition. After departing the Black Aces, Moyo signed for Witbank Spurs.

=== International ===
In January 2014, coach Ian Gorowa, invited him to be a part of the Zimbabwe squad for the 2014 African Nations Championship. He helped the team to a fourth-place finish after being defeated by Nigeria by a goal to nil. In March 2014, Moyo scored his first international goal in a friendly versus Malawi.

== Career statistics ==
=== Club ===
As of 23 June 2016.

Statistics
Club	Season	League			National Cup (Note: Includes the Nedbank Cup)		League Cup (Note: Includes the Telkom Knockout)		Continental (Note: Includes the CAF Champions League)		Other (Note: Includes the MTN 8)		Total	
Club	Season	Division	Apps	Goals	Apps	Goals	Apps	Goals	Apps	Goals	Apps	Goals	Apps	Goals
Witbank Spurs	2014–15	National First Division	9	0	0	0	0	0	—		0	0	9	0
Witbank Spurs	2015–16	National First Division	4	0	1	0	0	0	—		0	0	5	0
Witbank Spurs	Total		13	0	1	0	0	0	—		0	0	14	0
Career total			13	0	1	0	0	0	—		0	0	14	0

=== International ===
As of 23 June 2016.

National team	Year	Apps	Goals
Zimbabwe	2013	1	0
Zimbabwe	2014	7	1
Zimbabwe	2015	0	0
Zimbabwe	2016	0	0
Total		8	1

=== International goals ===
As of 23 June 2016. Scores and results list Zimbabwe's goal tally first.

Goal	Date	Venue	Opponent	Score	Result	Competition
1	5 March 2014	Kamuzu Stadium, Blantyre, Malawi	Malawi	1–0	4–1	Friendly

== Honours ==
=== Club ===
Highlanders

- Cup of Zimbabwe (1): 2013
