= Conlyde Luchanga =

Zambian footballer (born 1997)

Personal information
- Date of birth: 11 March 1997 (age 29)
- Place of birth: Ndola, Zambia
- Position: Forward

Team information
- Current team: Forest Rangers F.C.

Senior career*
Years	Team	Apps	(Gls)
2015-2017	Power Dynamos		
2016–2017	→ Hapoel Ra'anana (loan)	6	(0)
2017–2019	Lusaka Dynamos		
2019-	Forest Rangers F.C.		

International career^{‡}
2015–	Zambia	15	(1)
- * Club domestic league appearances and goals ‡ National team caps and goals as of 12:55, 10 March 2017 (UTC)

Conlyde Luchanga is a Zambian professional footballer who plays as a forward for Forest Rangers F.C.

== Club career ==
Luchanga played club football for Power Dynamos F.C., and had a brief loan spell with Hapoel Ra'anana. He left Power Dynamos in 2017 and joined rival club Lusaka Dynamos F.C.

== International career ==
=== International goals ===
Scores and results list Zambia's goal tally first.

No	Date	Venue	Opponent	Score	Result	Competition
1.	17 October 2015	Levy Mwanawasa Stadium, Ndola, Zambia	Mozambique	2–0	3–0	2016 African Nations Championship qualification
