= Gobeom Sie Vitalis =

Liberian footballer

Vatali Sie
Personal information
- Full name: Gobeom Sie Vitalis
- Date of birth: October 23, 1990 (age 36)
- Place of birth: Liberia
- Position: Forward

Senior career*
Years	Team	Apps	(Gls)
2006–2008	NPA Anchors		
2008–2011	LISCR	19	(15)
2011–2013	Hapoel Nazareth Illit		

International career
- Liberia
- * Club domestic league appearances and goals as of 14:57, 28 November 2011 (UTC)

Gobeom Sie Vitalis (born October 23, 1990) is a Liberian football defender. He previously played for Hapoel Nazareth Illit.

== Honors ==
- 2010–11: Liberian Golden Boot
