= Elderson Echiéjilé =

Nigerian footballer (born 1988)

Personal information
- Full name: Elderson Uwa Echiéjilé
- Date of birth: 20 January 1988 (age 38)
- Place of birth: Benin City, Nigeria
- Height: 1.85 m (6 ft 1 in)
- Position: Left-back

Youth career
- Pepsi Football Academy
- 2001–2004: Wikki Tourists

Senior career*
Years	Team	Apps	(Gls)
2004–2007	Bendel Insurance	35	(0)
2007–2010	Rennes	19	(0)
2010–2014	Braga	73	(5)
2012	Braga B	1	(0)
2014	Monaco B	1	(0)
2014–2018	Monaco	37	(1)
2016–2017	→ Standard Liège (loan)	6	(0)
2017	→ Sporting Gijón (loan)	3	(1)
2017–2018	→ Sivasspor (loan)	7	(0)
2018	→ Cercle Brugge (loan)	2	(0)
2019	HJK	5	(2)
Total		189	(9)

International career
2007	Nigeria U20	8	(1)
2009–2018	Nigeria	59	(2)
Medal record
Men's football
Representing Nigeria
Africa Cup of Nations
Winner	2013 South Africa
- * Club domestic league appearances and goals

Elderson Uwa Echiéjilé MON (born 20 January 1988) is a Nigerian former professional footballer who played as a left-back.

He began his career at Bendel Insurance and moved to Europe in 2007, joining Rennes where he was mainly a reserve. He spent four seasons in Portugal's Primeira Liga with Braga before returning to the French Ligue 1 in 2014 to join Monaco, being loaned several times until he was release four years later.

A full international for the Nigeria national team from 2009 until 2018, Echiéjilé played in two Africa Cup of Nations tournaments, winning the 2013 edition. He was also part of the squads at two World Cups.

== Club career ==
=== Rennes ===
Born in Benin City, Echiéjilé began his senior career at Bendel Insurance. In August 2007 he was sold to Rennes in France, playing his first Ligue 1 game on 23 December in a 0–0 draw at Toulouse.

During his spell with the club, however, he appeared mostly for the reserve team.

=== Braga ===
On 16 June 2010, Echiéjilé signed for Braga from Portugal for €2.5 million, on a four-year contract. He scored on his official debut for the club, netting from a corner kick in a 3–0 home win against Celtic in the qualifying rounds of the UEFA Champions League (4–2 on aggregate).

Echiéjilé played his first game in the Primeira Liga on 13 August 2010, featuring the full 90 minutes in a 3–1 home victory over Portimonense. He was an unused substitute in the 2011 UEFA Europa League Final, lost 1–0 to compatriots Porto at the Aviva Stadium in Dublin. Additionally, he scored four league goals in 26 matches in his second year, helping the Minho side finish third.

=== Monaco ===
On 17 January 2014, Echiéjilé returned to the French top flight after penning a four-and-a-half-year deal with Monaco. He scored his first goal for the team on 31 October, opening a 1–1 home draw with Reims.

On 31 August 2016, Echiéjilé moved to Belgian club Standard Liège on a season-long loan. Late into the following transfer window, he left for Spain with Sporting de Gijón also in a temporary deal.

Echiejilé continued to serve loans until his departure, representing Sivasspor and Cercle Brugge in the process.

=== HJK ===
In March 2019, Echiejilé signed with HJK Helsinki of the Finnish Veikkausliiga. On 28 June, both parties agreed to terminate the contract by mutual consent.

== International career ==
Echiéjilé was a member of the Nigerian under-20 team at the 2007 FIFA World Cup in Canada, playing five matches and scoring once for the quarter-finalists. Having made his debut for the senior side in 2009, he was picked for the following year's FIFA World Cup in South Africa, appearing twice in an eventual group stage exit.

Echiéjilé was called up to Nigeria's 23-man squad for the 2013 Africa Cup of Nations, scoring the first in a 4–1 semi-final defeat of Mali as the nation went on to win the tournament. Also that year he was selected for the FIFA Confederations Cup in Brazil, scoring in the opener against Tahiti.

Echiéjilé was included in Stephen Keshi's list for the 2014 World Cup, but sustained an injury in a warm-up game against Greece and was replaced by Ejike Uzoenyi. In June 2018, he was named in the 23-man squad for the upcoming edition of the FIFA World Cup in Russia, but was left out of the 2019 Africa Cup of Nations.

== Career statistics ==
=== International ===
Appearances and goals by national team and year
National team	Year	Apps	Goals
Nigeria	2009	4	0
Nigeria	2010	9	0
Nigeria	2011	3	0
Nigeria	2012	3	0
Nigeria	2013	18	2
Nigeria	2014	6	0
Nigeria	2015	4	0
Nigeria	2016	5	0
Nigeria	2017	5	0
Nigeria	2018	2	0
Nigeria	Total	59	2

List of international goals scored by Elderson Echiéjilé
No	Date	Venue	Opponent	Score	Result	Competition
1.	6 February 2013	Moses Mabhida Stadium, Durban, South Africa	Mali	1–0	4–1	2013 Africa Cup of Nations
2.	17 June 2013	Mineirão, Belo Horizonte, Brazil	Tahiti	6–1	6–1	2013 FIFA Confederations Cup

== Honours ==
Braga

- Taça da Liga: 2012–13

Nigeria

- Africa Cup of Nations: 2013

Orders

- Member of the Order of the Niger
