= Yaro Bature =

Nigerian professional football forward (born 1995)

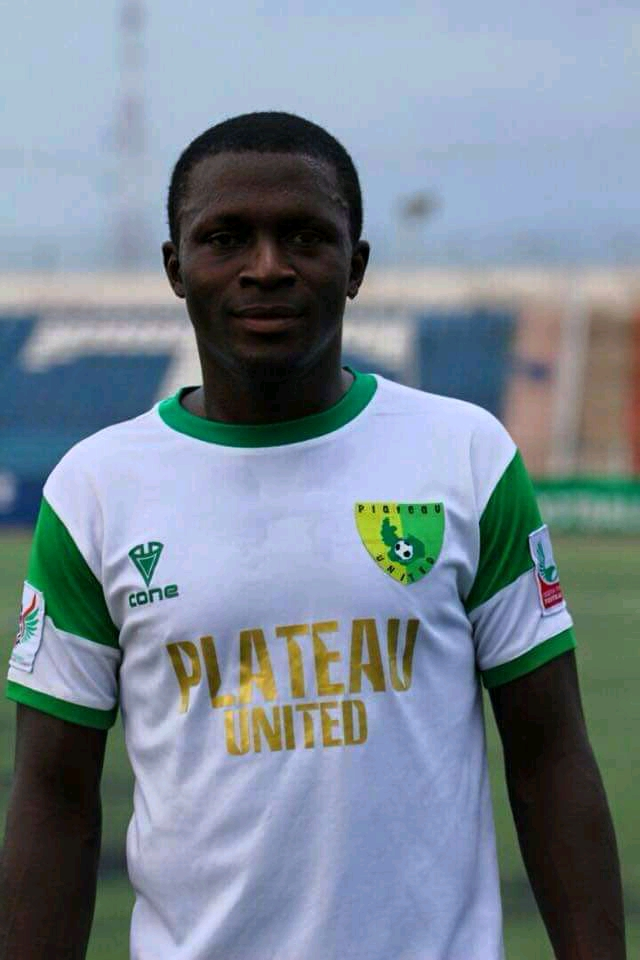

Personal information
- Full name: Yaro Emmanuel Bature
- Date of birth: 15 December 1995 (age 30)
- Place of birth: Jos, Nigeria
- Height: 1.62 m (5 ft 4 in)
- Position: Midfielder

Team information
- Current team: Asaria FC

Youth career
- 2009-2010: COD United
- 2011-2012: AMAC FC

Senior career*
Years	Team	Apps	(Gls)
2013-2014	Nassarawa United	33	(4)
2014-2015	Nassarawa United	31	(5)
2015-2016	Nassarawa United	35	(8)
2016-2017	Wikki Tourist	12	(5)
2016-2017	Plateau United	14	(7)
2017-2018	Kano Pillars	5	(0)
2021	Asaria	18	(2)

International career^{‡}
2015–	Nigeria	8	(2)
2014–	Nigeria U-23	8	(1)
Medal record
2019 FA cup winner with kano pillars
2016-2017 Premier League Champions with Plateau United FC 2013 Winner of the FA Cup Lagos State with C.O.D United 2009 Winner of the FA Cup Abuja with AMAC FC
- Senior club appearances and goals counted for the domestic league only and correct as of 20 September 2021
- * Club domestic league appearances and goals ‡ National team caps and goals as of 14 October 2019

Bature Yaro Kawu (born on 15 December 1995) is a Nigerian professional footballer who plays as a central midfielder for Asaria FC (Libya). He also played for the Nigeria national football team.

== Honors ==
- 2016-2017 Premier League Champions with Plateau United FC
- 2013 Winner of the FA Cup Lagos State with C.O.D United
- 2009Winner of the FA Cup Abuja with AMAC FC

* Senior club appearances and goals counted for the domestic league only and correct as of 20 September 2021
