= Christian Obiozor =

Nigerian footballer (born 1994)

Personal information
- Full name: Chinonso Christian Obiozor
- Date of birth: 31 October 1994 (age 32)
- Place of birth: Nigeria
- Height: 1.92 m (6 ft 4 in)
- Position: Forward

Senior career*
Years	Team	Apps	(Gls)
2012	Ocean Boys		
2015	Kano Pillars F.C.	12	(72)
2015–2017	Enyimba	17	(9)
2018–2019	Enyimba	20	(15)
2019	Stade Gabèsien	40	(20)
2022	Shabab Sahel	9	(6)
2022	Tadamon Sour	15	(5)
2023	Perak FC	9	(1)

International career
2013–2015	Nigeria	3	(1)
- * Club domestic league appearances and goals as of 14:21, 11 February 2023 (UTC)

Chinonso Christian Obiozor (born 31 October 1994) is a Nigerian footballer who plays as a forward.

== International career ==
In January 2014, coach Stephen Keshi, invited him to be a part of the Nigeria 23-man team for the 2014 African Nations Championship. He helped the team defeat Zimbabwe to a third-place finish by a goal to nil.
