= Rabiu Ali =

Nigerian footballer (born 1981)

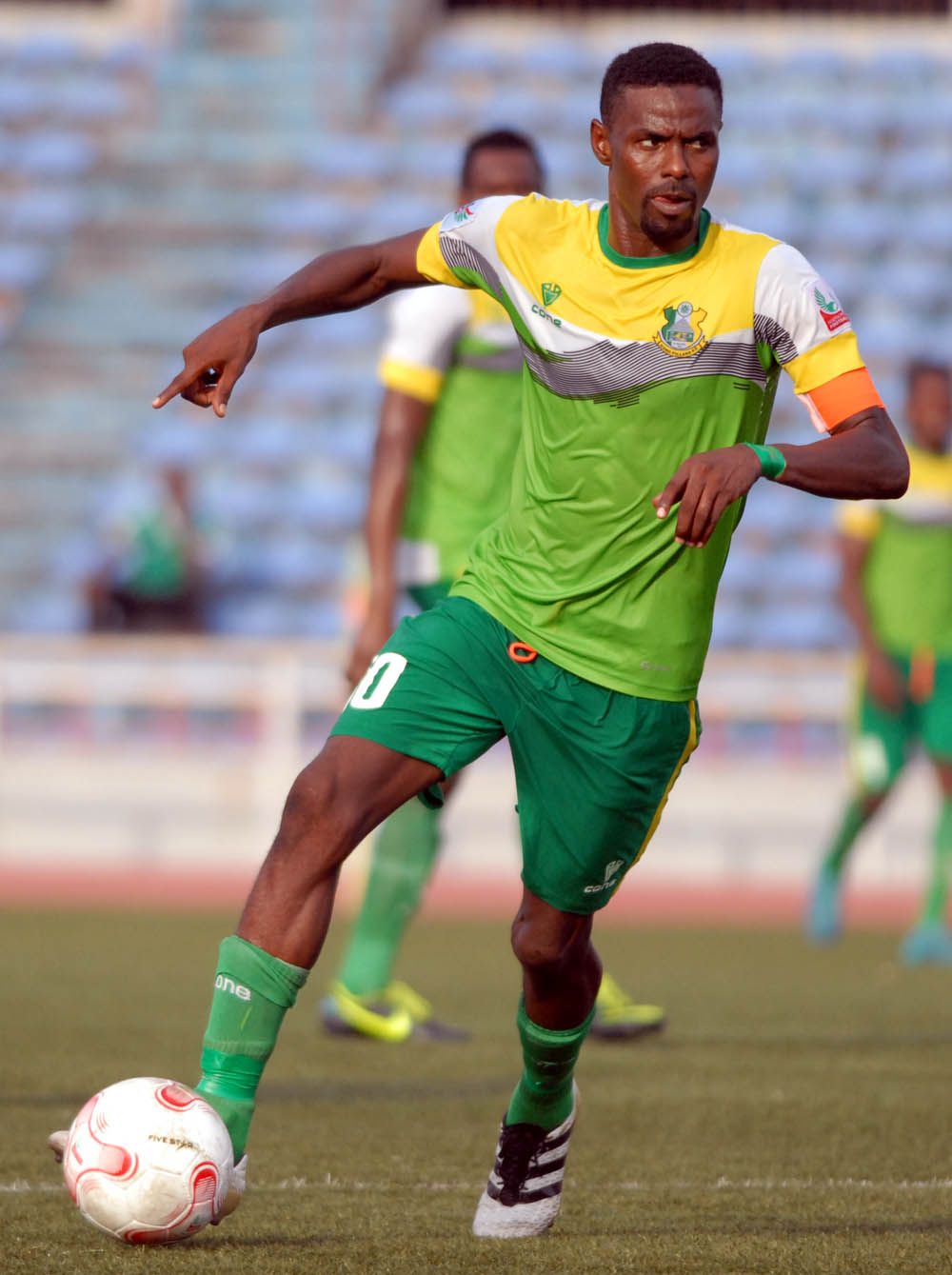

Personal information
- Full name: Rabiu Ali Pele
- Date of birth: 27 September 1980 (age 46)
- Place of birth: Kano, Nigeria
- Height: 1.80 m (5 ft 11 in)
- Position: Midfielder

Team information
- Current team: Kano Pillars F.C.
- Number: 10

Senior career*
Years	Team	Apps	(Gls)
2009-	Kano Pillars F.C.	271	(140)

International career^{‡}
2013–2019	Nigeria	18	(5)
- * Club domestic league appearances and goals as of 7 October 2024 ‡ National team caps and goals as of 7 October 2024

Rabiu Ali (born 27 September 1980) is a Nigerian football midfielder who plays for Kano Pillars F.C. He is the current captain of Kano Pillars F.C. and is regarded as one of the club's greatest ever players and one of the best players in Nigerian Professional Football League.

Prior to joining Kano Pillars in 2009, he played for Nasarawa United.

== International career ==
=== International goals ===
Scores and results list Nigeria's goal tally first.

No	Date	Venue	Opponent	Score	Result	Competition
1.	15 January 2014	Cape Town Stadium, Cape Town, South Africa	Mozambique	2–1	4–2	2014 African Nations Championship
2.	15 January 2014	Cape Town Stadium, Cape Town, South Africa	Mozambique	3–2	4–2	2014 African Nations Championship
3.	25 January 2014	Cape Town Stadium, Cape Town, South Africa	Morocco	3–2	4–3 (a.e.t.)	2014 African Nations Championship
4.	19 August 2017	Sani Abacha Stadium, Kano, Nigeria	Benin	1–0	2–0	2018 African Nations Championship qualification
5.	23 January 2018	Stade Adrar, Agadir, Morocco	Equatorial Guinea	3–1	3–1	2018 African Nations Championship

== Honours ==
Kano Pillars

- Nigeria Premier League: 2011–12, 2012–13, 2013–14
- Nigeria FA Cup: 2019
