= Ugonna Uzochukwu =

Nigerian footballer

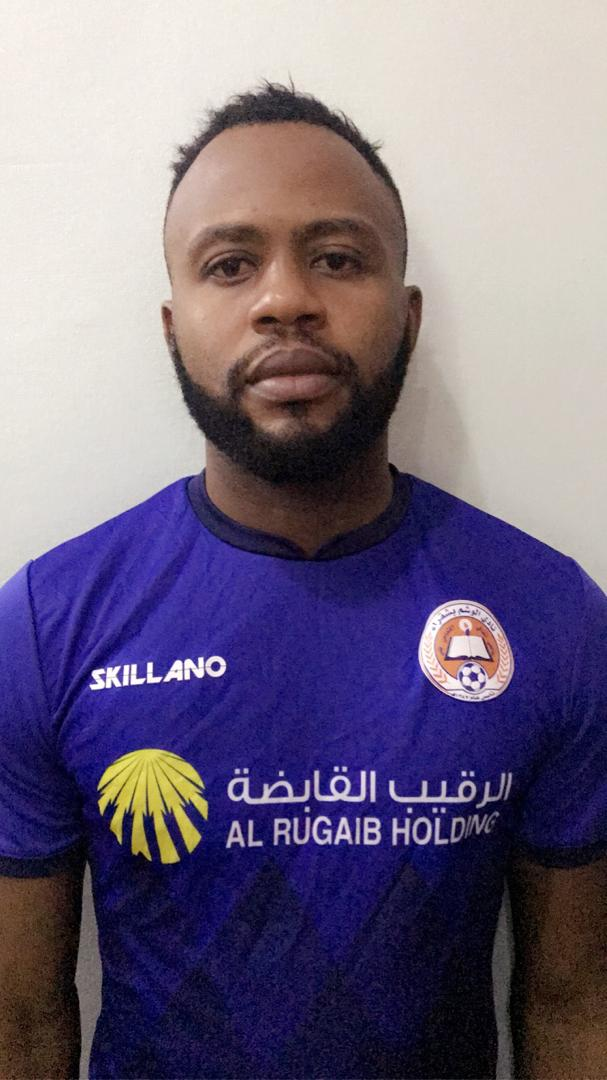

Personal information
- Date of birth: 5 November 1991 (age 34)
- Place of birth: Nigeria
- Position: Midfielder

Youth career
- 2012: Anambra Pillars

Senior career*
Years	Team	Apps	(Gls)
2013–2014	Enugu Rangers	24	(8)
2014–2016	Chippa United	20	(2)
2016–2019	Olympique de Khouribga	15	(3)
2018-2019	Al-Baqa'a	14	(4)
2019–2020	Al-Washm	13	(3)

International career
2014	Nigeria	9	(2)
- * Club domestic league appearances and goals

Ugonna Uzochukwu (born 5 November 1991) is a Nigerian professional footballer, who plays as a midfielder. He is currently a free agent.

He began his professional football career in his homeland Nigeria for Enugu Rangers.

== Club career ==
Born in Lagos, Nigeria, Uzochukwu started his youth football Anambra Pillars F.C. before booming interest from Enugu Rangerswhere he started his professional football career (a premier division club in Nigeria). He featured regularly for the side, also winning the best Midfielder of the Season in 2015.

=== Chippa United ===
Uzochukwu made a move to South African club Chippa United where he made 20 league appearances scoring two goals.

=== Olympique de Khouribga ===
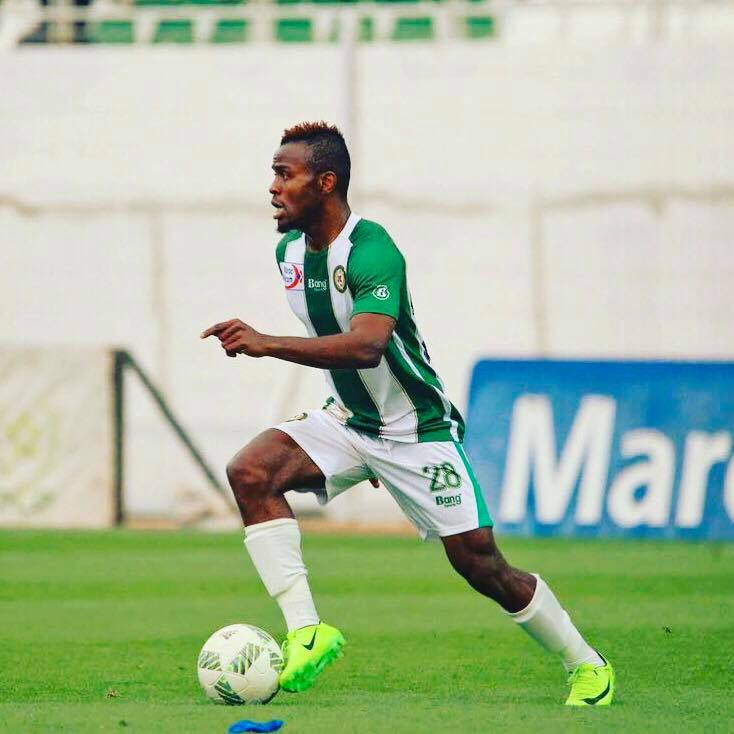
Ugonna in 2018

Uzochukwu signed on a four-year contract with Botola club Olympique de Khouribga in September 2016.

He signed for Saudi Arabia second tier League club Al-Washm in February 2019.

== International career ==
In January 2014, coach Stephen Keshi, invited Uzochukwu to be included in the Nigeria national football team for the 2014 African Nations Championship. He helped the team to a third-place finish after Nigeria beat Zimbabwe by a goal to nil. He has made nine appearances scoring two goals for Nigeria.

== Career statistics ==
As of 6 September 2014

Nigeria
Year	Apps	Goals
2014	9	2
Total	9	2
