= Abdoulaye Sissoko =

Malian footballer

Personal information
- Full name: Abdoulaye Sissoko
- Date of birth: 18 July 1992 (age 34)
- Place of birth: Mali
- Position: Midfielder

Team information
- Current team: Moghreb Tétouan
- Number: 26

Senior career*
Years	Team	Apps	(Gls)
2013–2014	Stade Malien		
2015–2016	ES Tunis	3	(0)
2017–2019	TP Mazembe		
2019–	Moghreb Tétouan	6	(3)

International career^{‡}
2014–	Mali	8	(2)
- * Club domestic league appearances and goals as of 15:59, 28 November 2019 (UTC) ‡ National team caps and goals as of 02:31, 27 May 2016 (UTC)

Abdoulaye Sissoko (born 18 July 1992) is a Malian footballer who plays for Moghreb Tétouan.

== International career ==
=== International goals ===
Scores and results list Mali's goal tally first.

Goal	Date	Venue	Opponent	Score	Result	Competition
1.	11 January 2014	Cape Town Stadium, Cape Town, South Africa	Nigeria	1–0	2–1	2014 African Nations Championship
2.	5 July 2015	Stade Modibo Kéïta, Bamako, Mali	Guinea-Bissau	3–1	3–1	2016 African Nations Championship qualification

== Honours ==
Stade Malien

Winner

- Malian Première Division: 2013–14

TP Mazembe

Winner

- CAF Confederation Cup: 2017
