= Ejike Uzoenyi =

Nigerian footballer (born 1988)

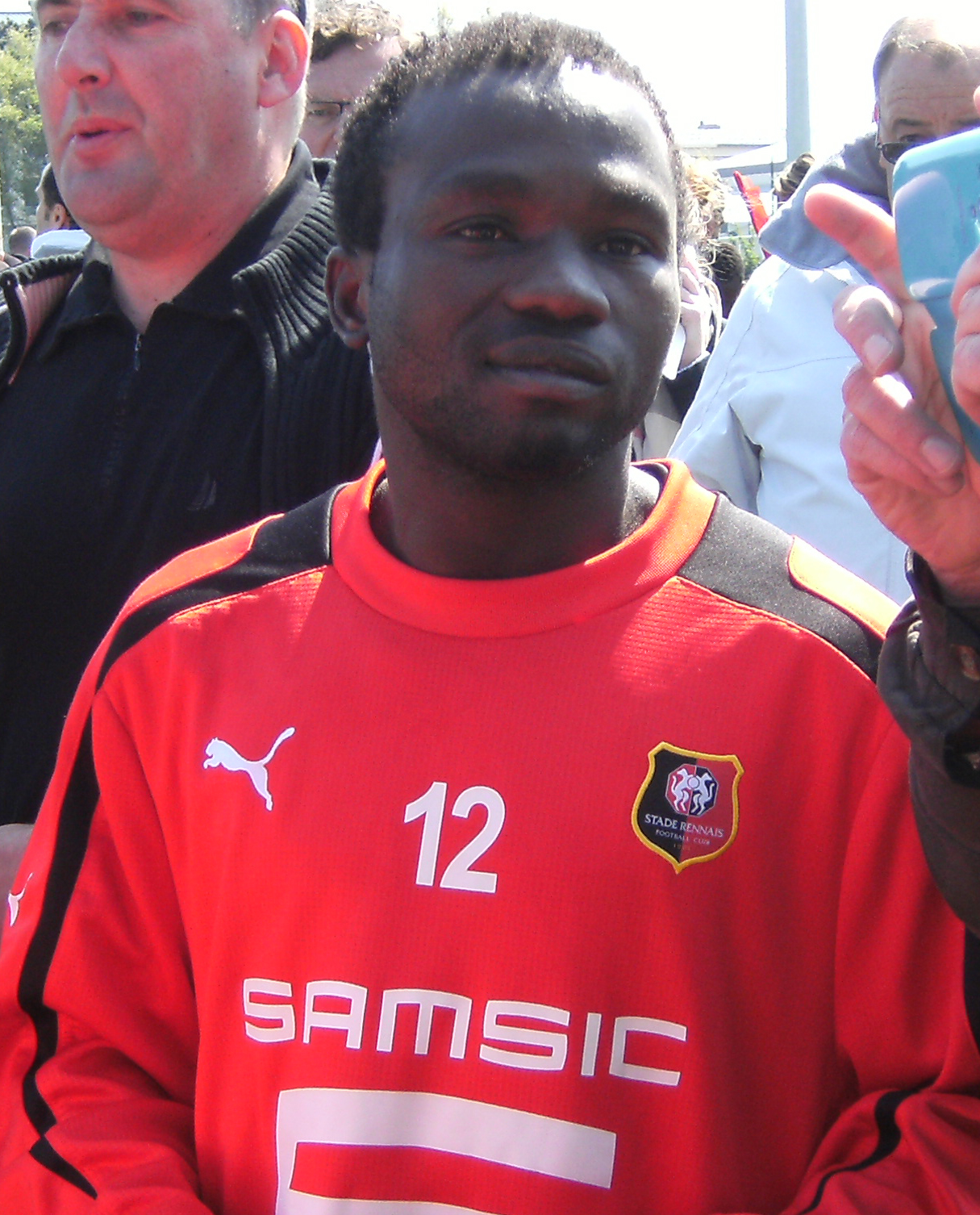
- Uzoenyi with Rennes in 2013

Personal information
- Full name: Christantus Ejike Uzoenyi
- Date of birth: 23 March 1988 (age 38)
- Place of birth: Aba, Nigeria
- Position: Left winger

Senior career*
Years	Team	Apps	(Gls)
2005–2008	Enyimba		
2008–2014	Enugu Rangers		
2013	→ Rennes (loan)	1	(0)
2013	→ Rennes II (loan)	3	(0)
2014–2017	Mamelodi Sundowns	6	(0)
2014	→ Enugu Rangers (loan)		
2017	Bidvest Wits	2	(1)
2017	Ajax Cape Town	4	(0)
2020	Zvijezda 09	11	(0)
2020–2021	Sunshine Stars		
2021–2023	Enugu Rangers	19	(0)

International career^{‡}
2012–2014	Nigeria	21	(3)
Medal record
Men's Football
Representing Nigeria
Africa Cup of Nations
Winner	2013 South Africa
- * Club domestic league appearances and goals as of 19:56, 17 December 2023 (UTC) ‡ National team caps and goals as of 18:54, 28 July 2021 (UTC)

Christantus Ejike Uzoenyi MON (born 23 March 1988) is a Nigerian former professional footballer who played as a left winger.

== Club career ==
Uzoenyi has played club football in Nigeria and France for Enyimba, Rangers International and Rennes. On 20 February 2014, he signed for South African club Mamelodi Sundowns; he will remain with Enugu Rangers on loan before moving to South Africa in June 2014. On 15 February 2017, Uzoenyi signed with South African club Bidvest Wits. He then joined Ajax Cape Town. Uzoenyi parted ways with Ajax Cape Town in December 2017.

On 28 February 2020, Uzoenyi returned to football and signed a contract with, at the time, Bosnian Premier League club Zvijezda 09. He made his official debut for Zvijezda 09 in a 3–0 defeat against Željezničar on 29 February 2020.

In July 2020, Uzoenyi left Zvijedza 09 and shortly after, joined Montenegrin First League club Titograd. However, the deal was never officially confirmed and he played the rest of 2020 at Zvijezda 09.

In the summer 2020, Uzoenyi returned to Nigeria and joined Sunshine Stars. He then played for Enugu Rangers.

== International career ==
Uzoenyi made his international debut for Nigeria in 2012, and has appeared in FIFA World Cup qualifying matches. He was called up to Nigeria's 23-man squad for the 2013 Africa Cup of Nations. He was named to Nigeria's squad for the 2014 African Nations Championship and was selected the most valuable player of the tournament.

Uzoenyi was also named in the provisional squad for the 2014 FIFA World Cup, making the final squad after Uwa Echiejile was excluded by injury.

== Career statistics ==
=== International ===
Appearances and goals by national team and year
National team	Year	Apps	Goals
Nigeria	2012	11	0
Nigeria	2013	2	0
Nigeria	2014	9	3
Total		22	3

Scores and results list Nigeria's goal tally first, score column indicates score after each Uzoenyi goal.

List of international goals scored by Ejike Uzoenyi
No.	Date	Venue	Opponent	Score	Result	Competition	Ref.
1	19 January 2014	Cape Town Stadium, Cape Town, South Africa	South Africa	1–0	3–1	2014 African Nations Championship	
2	19 January 2014	Cape Town Stadium, Cape Town, South Africa	South Africa	3–0	3–1	2014 African Nations Championship	
3	25 January 2014	Cape Town Stadium, Cape Town, South Africa	Morocco	3–3	4–3	2014 African Nations Championship	

== Honours ==
Enyimba

- Nigerian Professional Football League: 2005, 2007
- Federation Cup: 2005

Mamelodi Sundowns

- Premier Soccer League: 2015–16
- Nedbank Cup: 2014–15
- CAF Champions League: 2016

Bidvest Wits

- Premier Soccer League: 2016–17

Nigeria

- Africa Cup of Nations: 2013

Orders

- Member of the Order of the Niger
