= Danisa Phiri =

Zimbabwean footballer (born 1979)

Personal information
- Date of birth: 1 July 1979 (age 47)
- Place of birth: Zimbabwe
- Positions: Defender; midfielder

Senior career*
Years	Team	Apps	(Gls)
2003–2008	Njube Sundowns		
2007	→ Highlanders (loan)		
2008	Dynamos		
2008–2010	Njube Sundowns		
2010	Bantu Rovers		
2015	Tsholotsho		

International career
2008	Zimbabwe	1	(0)
- * Club domestic league appearances and goals

Danisa Phiri (born 1 July 1979) is a Zimbabwean former professional footballer who played as a defender and midfielder.

== Career ==
Phiri played for five clubs during his playing career. He began with Njube Sundowns. In 2007, he joined Highlanders on loan. He then spent a short time with Dynamos in 2008 before returning to Njube, two years later he signed for Bantu Rovers in 2010 before going into coaching with Quelaton. He had a spell with Tsholotsho in 2015 after coming out of retirement alongside Joel Luphahla and Siza Khoza. Phiri won one cap for the Zimbabwe national team.

In 2012, Phiri, along with five other footballers, were given life bans from football due to their part in the Asiagate match fixing scandal with the Zimbabwe national team that took place between 2007 and 2009. However, on 24 May 2015, Phiri was cleared of any wrongdoing in the Asiagate scandal. He proved to the ZIFA that he did not take part in the matches involved.

== Personal life ==
In 2020, Phiri teamed up with six other former footballers, including Ronald Sibanda, to hold a training camp to support young, local players in Bulawayo.
