= Siphelele Ntshangase =

South African soccer player (born 1993)

Personal information
- Full name: Siphelele Leonard Ntshangase
- Date of birth: 11 May 1993 (age 33)
- Place of birth: Pongola, South Africa
- Position: Midfielder

Youth career
- –2013: Brazil Academy

Senior career*
Years	Team	Apps	(Gls)
2013–2017	Black Leopards	77	(15)
2017–2018	Baroka	10	(0)
2018–2021	Kaizer Chiefs	22	(0)

International career^{‡}
2015	South Africa U23	2	(1)
2015–	South Africa	6	(2)
- * Club domestic league appearances and goals as of 14:53, 10 July 2020 (UTC) ‡ National team caps and goals as of 22:38, 12 May 2017 (UTC)

Siphelele Leonard Ntshangase (born 11 May 1993) is a South African professional soccer player who plays as a midfielder and has played for the South African national team.

== Club career ==
=== Early career ===
Born in Pongola, Ntshangase played for the Brazil Academy in KwaNdengezi, Durban as a young player and had spells with Lamontville Golden Arrows, Thanda Royal Zulu and Mamelodi Sundowns, but was turned down by all three clubs. He joined Black Leopards in 2013. He made his debut for the club in the National First Division on 25 January 2014 in a 2–2 draw at home to Baroka and scored his first league goal for the club on 12 February 2014 in a 2–2 at home to Ubuntu Cape Town. In total, he made 15 appearances for the club over the 2013–14 season, scoring 4. Over the next three seasons, he would make a further 62 league appearances, scoring 11 goals.

=== Baroka ===
On 22 August 2017, Ntshangase signed for South African Premier Division side Baroka on a two-year contract. He made his debut for them that day, coming on as a half-time substitute in a 1–1 draw at home to Orlando Pirates, before making another 9 appearances for them prior to the turn of the year, though did not score.

=== Kaizer Chiefs ===
In early January 2018, Ntshangase signed for Johannesburg-based South African Premier Division side Kaizer Chiefs on a two-and-a-half-year deal for an undisclosed fee. Chiefs reportedly wished to sign him from Black Leopards during the previous summer, but pulled out of the deal as Black Leopards wished to Charge Chiefs more for the player than they would for other clubs. He made his debut for the club as a second-half substitute in a 2–1 victory at home to Kaizer Chiefs on 13 January 2018, before going on to make a further 7 league appearances in the 2017–18 season, though Ntshangase was criticised for his lack of defensive contributions.

Across the 2018–19 season, Ntshangase struggled to adapt to the style of play at Kaizer Chiefs as despite praise for his passing ability, with him struggling to hold down a first-team place, making just 14 appearances across the season, whilst he did not appear in the league during the 2019–20 season. Despite criticism for his performances at Chiefs, Ntshangase signed a one-year contract extension in the summer of 2020. In response to his new contract, Ntshangase's agent Jazzman Mahlakgane that it was up to Ntshangase to prove his worth and that "he's very much aware that he has to perform". He was released by Chiefs in March 2021.

== International career ==
Having previously played for South Africa at under-23 level, Ntshangase was called up to the South Africa national football team for the first time in March 2015, and made his debut for South Africa as a substitute in a 3–1 victory against Swaziland on 25 March 2015. He made three further appearances for South Africa in 2015, including scoring two in a 3–0 victory against Mauritius, before appearing twice again for them in 2017.

== Career statistics ==
=== International goals ===
Scores and results list South Africa's goal tally first.

No	Date	Venue	Opponent	Score	Result	Competition
1.	20 June 2015	Dobsonville Stadium, Johannesburg, South Africa	Mauritius	2–0	3–0	2016 African Nations Championship qualification
2.	20 June 2015	Dobsonville Stadium, Johannesburg, South Africa	Mauritius	3–0	3–0	2016 African Nations Championship qualification
