= Solomon Kwambe =

Nigerian footballer

Personal information
- Full name: Solomon Sesugh Kwambe
- Date of birth: 30 September 1993 (age 33)
- Place of birth: Benue State, Nigeria
- Height: 1.87 m (6 ft 2 in)
- Position: Centre back

Team information
- Current team: Lobi Stars
- Number: 31

Youth career
- 2008–2010: Mighty Jets

Senior career*
Years	Team	Apps	(Gls)
2010–2012	Plateau United	43	(5)
2012–2015	Sunshine Stars	61	(8)
2013–2014	→ Warri Wolves (loan)	7	(0)
2016–2020	Lobi Stars	70	(5)
2020–2021	FC Tulsa	15	(0)
2021–	Lobi Stars	49	(0)

International career
2012–2015	Nigeria	15	(0)
- * Club domestic league appearances and goals as of 12:49, 20 July 2025 (UTC)

Solomon Sesugh Kwambe (born 30 September 1993) is a Nigerian professional footballer who plays as a centre back for Lobi Stars.

== International career ==
He made his debut for Nigeria versus Niger in a friendly game on 15 August 2012. He was selected for Nigeria's squad at the 2013 FIFA Confederations Cup. Solomon Kwambe was called up to Nigeria's 23-man squad for the 2014 African Nations Championship.
