= Barnabas Imenger (footballer, born 1991) =

Nigerian footballer

Barnabas Imenger Jr.
Personal information
- Full name: Barnabas Nanen Imenger Junior
- Date of birth: 24 November 1991 (age 34)
- Place of birth: Makurdi, Nigeria
- Height: 1.78 m (5 ft 10 in)
- Position: Forward

Team information
- Current team: Lobi Stars
- Number: 9

Youth career
- Kwara Football Academy

Senior career*
Years	Team	Apps	(Gls)
2009–2012	Kwara United	58	(23)
2012	Trelleborgs	8	(1)
2013–2017	Lobi Stars	56	(19)
2014	→ Kano Pillars (loan)	1	(0)
2017	MC Alger	9	(0)
2018–2020	Akwa United	5	(0)
2019	→ Sunshine Stars (loan)	5	(0)
2020–2021	Nasarawa United	3	(0)
2021–	Lobi Stars	32	(5)

International career
2012–2014	Nigeria	7	(1)
- * Club domestic league appearances and goals as of 20 July 2025

Barnabas Nanen Imenger Junior (born 24 November 1990) is a Nigerian professional footballer who plays as a forward for Lobi Stars. He is the son of former Nigeria International Barnabas Imenger.

== Club career ==
After beginning his career at Kwara United F.C. he signed with Swedish side Trelleborgs FF in August 2012 for a six-month contract.

After his six months were up, he returned to Nigeria to play for Lobi Stars, the team where his father is a board member.

He was loaned to Kano Pillars F.C. at the beginning of the 2015 season but was recalled in July.

== International career ==
He was called up by coach Stephen Keshi for a new batch of Super Eagles in January 2012 and debuted in a 0-0 friendly against Angola. He also played in a 3-2 friendly loss to Egypt.
