= Diogo (Mozambican footballer) =

Mozambican footballer

Personal information
- Full name: Diogo António Alberto
- Date of birth: 1 March 1989 (age 37)
- Place of birth: Tete, Mozambique
- Date of death: 25 July 2023 (aged 34)
- Position: Midfielder

Team information
- Current team: Clube Ferroviário de Maputo

Senior career*
| Years | Team | Apps | (Gls) |
| 2009 | Chingale | | |
| 2010 | Costa do Sol | | |
| 2011 | HCB Songo | | |
| 2012– | Ferroviário Maputo | | |

International career^{‡}
| 2012–2015 | Mozambique | 31 | (5) |
- * Club domestic league appearances and goals as of 12 June 2020 ‡ National team caps and goals as of 12 June 2020

Diogo António Alberto (1 March 1989 – 25 July 2023), known simply as Diogo, was a Mozambican footballer who played as a midfielder for Clube Ferroviário de Maputo. He made 31 appearances for the Mozambique national team.
