= Guinea national football team results (2000–2019) =

This page details the match results and statistics of the Guinea national football team from 2000 to 2019.

== Key ==
- Att.=Match attendance
- (H)=Home ground
- (A)=Away ground
- (N)=Neutral ground

== Results ==
Guinea's score is shown first in each case.

Date	Venue	Opponents	Score	Competition	Guinea scorers	Att.	Ref.
8 April 2000	Nakivubo Stadium, Kampala (A)	Uganda	4–4	2002 FIFA World Cup qualification	Thiam 24', Youla 55', 83', Feindouno 88'	8,609	
23 April 2000	Stade du 28 Septembre, Conakry (H)	Uganda	3–0	2002 FIFA World Cup qualification	T. Camara 47', Feindouno 70', 74'	20,000	
5 May 2000	Estádio Municipal Adérito Sena, Praia (N)	Mali	3–1	2000 Amílcar Cabral Cup	Cisse 62', Bangoura 72', M. Sylla 81'	2,500	
7 May 2000	Estádio Municipal Adérito Sena, Praia (N)	Mauritania	1–1	2000 Amílcar Cabral Cup	M. Sylla 26'	4,000	
9 May 2000	Estádio Municipal Adérito Sena, Praia (N)	Guinea-Bissau	2–1	2000 Amílcar Cabral Cup	A.Sow 41', A.Sylla 82'		
11 May 2000	Estádio Municipal Adérito Sena, Praia (N)	Cape Verde	0–2	2000 Amílcar Cabral Cup			
14 May 2000	Estádio Municipal Adérito Sena, Praia (N)	Mali	2–0	2000 Amílcar Cabral Cup	Siabuno 8', O. Camara 67'		
14 January 2001	Stade du 28 Septembre, Conakry (H)	Togo	0–0	2002 African Cup of nations qualification		20,000	
20 January 2001	Stade Modibo Kéïta, Bamako (A)	Mali	1–0	Friendly	Unknown		
28 January 2001	Stade du 28 Septembre, Conakry (H)	Malawi	1–1	2002 FIFA World Cup qualification	S. Bangoura 24'	15,000	
13 January 2002	Moulay Abdellah Sports Complex, Rabat (A)	Morocco	1–2	Friendly	T. Camara 11'		
1 September 2002	Independence Stadium, Bakau (A)	Gambia	0–1	Friendly			
8 September 2002	Stade du 28 Septembre, Conakry (H)	Liberia	3–0	2004 African Cup of Nations qualification	T. Camara 1', Mansaré 56', Conté 57'	35,000	
13 October 2002	Addis Ababa Stadium, Addis Ababa (A)	Ethiopia	0–1	2004 African Cup of Nations qualification			
12 February 2003	Stade de Bon Rencontre, Toulon (N)	Mali	0–1	Friendly			
30 March 2003	Stade du 28 Septembre, Conakry (H)	Niger	2–0	2004 African Cup of Nations qualification	Mansaré 40' pen., M. Sylla 89'	25,000	
7 June 2003	Stade Général Seyni Kountché, Niamey (A)	Niger	0–1	2004 African Cup of Nations qualification		50,000	
21 June 2003	Accra Sports Stadium, Accra (A)	Liberia	2–1	2004 African Cup of Nations qualification	Youla 11', 50'	1,000	
6 July 2003	Stade du 28 Septembre, Conakry (H)	Ethiopia	3–0	2004 African Cup of Nations qualification	Youla 5', 90', Feindouno 57'	25,000	
20 August 2003	7 November Stadium, Radès (A)	Tunisia	0–0	Friendly		8,000	
12 October 2003	Stade du 28 Septembre, Conakry (H)	Mozambique	1–0	2006 FIFA World Cup qualification	S. Bangoura 70'	13,400	
16 November 2003	Estádio da Machava, Maputo (A)	Mozambique	4–3	2006 FIFA World Cup qualification	Youla 17', S. Bangoura 25', 35', 60'	50,000	
20 January 2004	FRA	Burkina Faso	1–0	Friendly	T. Camara 72'		
25 January 2004	El Menzah Stadium, El Menzah (N)	DR Congo	2–1	2004 African Cup of Nations	T. Camara 68', Feindouno 81'	2,000	
28 January 2004	15 October Stadium, Bizerte (N)	Rwanda	1–1	2004 African Cup of Nations	T. Camara 49'	4,000	
1 February 2004	7 November Stadium, Radès (N)	Tunisia	1–1	2004 African Cup of Nations	T. Camara 84'	18,000	
7 February 2004	El Menzah Stadium, El Menzah (N)	Mali	1–2	2004 African Cup of Nations	Feindouno 15'	1,450	
28 April 2004	FRA	Ivory Coast	2–4	Friendly	Feindouno 12', S.Oularé 39'	2,000	
29 May 2004	Stade Sébastien Charléty, Paris (N)	Senegal	1–1	Friendly	Diawara 24' pen.	2,000	
20 June 2004	GUI	Tunisia	2–1	2006 FIFA World Cup qualification	Diawara 12', 46'	15,300	
3 July 2004	MWL	Malawi	1–1	2006 FIFA World Cup qualification	Diawara 80'	11,383	
5 September 2004	GUI	Botswana	4–0	2006 FIFA World Cup qualification	Feindouno 44', Youla 54', Diawara 60', Mansaré 82'	25,000	
10 October 2004	GUI	Morocco	1–1	2006 FIFA World Cup qualification	Mansaré 50'	25,000	
17 November 2004	KEN	Kenya	1–2	2006 FIFA World Cup qualification	Feindouno 19 pen.	16,000	
9 February 2005	Stade de France, Saint-Denis (N)	Mali	2–2	Friendly	Thiam 6', Feindouno 55'	2,000	
26 March 2005	Stade Moulay Abdellah, Rabat (A)	Morocco	0–1	2006 FIFA World Cup qualification		70,000	
5 June 2005	Stade du 28 Septembre, Conakry (H)	Kenya	1–0	2006 FIFA World Cup qualification	S. Bangoura 68'	21,000	
11 June 2005	Stade 7 November, Radès (A)	Tunisia	0–2	2006 FIFA World Cup qualification		30,000	
16 August 2005	Stade Yves-du-Manoir, Colombes (N)	DR Congo	1–3	Friendly	I. Bangoura 70'	2,000	
4 September 2005	Stade du 28 Septembre, Conakry (H)	Malawi	3–1	2006 FIFA World Cup qualification	Feindouno 12', Diawara 36', S. Bangoura 67'	2,518	
8 October 2005	Botswana National Stadium, Gaborone (A)	Botswana	2–1	2006 FIFA World Cup qualification	O. Bangoura 73', 76'	16,800	
18 November 2005	Stade du 28 Septembre, Conakry (H)	Guinea-Bissau	2–2	2005 Amílcar Cabral Cup	Soumah 7', O. Camara 75'		
22 November 2005	Stade du 28 Septembre, Conakry (H)	Sierra Leone	1–0	2005 Amílcar Cabral Cup	Bachir Kaba 19'		
7 January 2006	Stade Henri Longuet, Viry-Châtillon (N)	Togo	1–0	Friendly	O. Bangoura 65' pen.	2,500	
22 January 2006	Harras El-Hedoud Stadium, Alexandria (N)	South Africa	2–0	2006 Africa Cup of Nations	S. Bangoura 76', O. Bangoura 87'	10,000	
26 January 2006	Harras El-Hedoud Stadium, Alexandria (N)	Zambia	2–1	2006 Africa Cup of Nations	Feindouno 74' pen., 90'	24,000	
30 January 2006	Harras El-Hedoud Stadium, Alexandria (N)	Tunisia	3–0	2006 Africa Cup of Nations	O. Bangoura 16', Feindouno 69', Diawara 90'	18,000	
3 February 2006	Harras El-Hedoud Stadium, Alexandria (N)	Senegal	2–3	2006 Africa Cup of Nations	Diawara 24', Feindouno 90+5'	17,000	
16 August 2006	Stade Robert Diochon, Rouen (N)	Cameroon	1–1	Friendly	Mansaré 70' pen.		
3 September 2006	Stade du 28 Septembre, Conakry (H)	Algeria	0–0	2008 Africa Cup of Nations qualification			
7 October 2006	Estádio da Várzea, Praia (A)	Cape Verde	0–1	2008 Africa Cup of Nations qualification			
6 February 2007	Stade Robert Diochon, Rouen (N)	Ivory Coast	0–1	Friendly			
24 March 2007	Independence Stadium, Bakau (A)	Gambia	2–0	2008 Africa Cup of Nations qualification	Diawara 50', Feindouno 70'		
3 June 2007	Stade du 28 Septembre, Conakry (H)	Gambia	2–2	2008 Africa Cup of Nations qualification	M. Diallo 10', Mansaré 53'		
16 June 2007	Stade 5 Juillet 1962, Algiers (A)	Algeria	2–0	2008 Africa Cup of Nations qualification	Mansaré 43', Feindouno 84'	80,000	
9 September 2007	Stade du 28 Septembre, Conakry (H)	Cape Verde	4–0	2008 Africa Cup of Nations qualification	Feindouno 19', M. Cisse 32', I. Camara 39', I. Bangoura 45'		
14 October 2007	Stade Robert Diochon, Rouen (N)	Senegal	1–3	Friendly	Mansaré 45'		
20 November 2007	Stade Paul Fischer, Melun (N)	Angola	3–0	Friendly	Baldé 41', Correia 66', Cissé 90'		
11 January 2008	Estadio Francisco Pérez, Estepona (N)	Sudan	6–0	Friendly	Youla 24', 37', 68', 82', I. Bangoura 76', Correia 89'		
20 January 2008	Ohene Djan Stadium, Accra (N)	Ghana	1–2	2008 Africa Cup of Nations	Kalabane 65'	35,000	
24 January 2008	Ohene Djan Stadium, Accra (N)	Morocco	3–2	2008 Africa Cup of Nations	Feindouno 11', 63' pen., Bangoura 59'	15,000	
28 January 2008	Sekondi-Takoradi Stadium, Sekondi-Takoradi (N)	Namibia	1–1	2008 Africa Cup of Nations	Youla 62'	1,000	
3 February 2008	Sekondi-Takoradi Stadium, Sekondi-Takoradi (N)	Ivory Coast	0–5	2008 Africa Cup of Nations		28,000	
25 March 2008	Stade Déjérine, Paris (N)	Togo	2–0	Friendly	Doumbouya 80', 90'		
1 June 2008	Stade du 28 Septembre, Conakry (H)	Zimbabwe	0–0	2010 FIFA World Cup qualification		12,000	
7 June 2008	Nyayo National Stadium, Nairobi (A)	Kenya	0–2	2010 FIFA World Cup qualification		35,000	
14 June 2008	Sam Nujoma Stadium, Windhoek (A)	Namibia	2–1	2010 FIFA World Cup qualification	Is. Bangoura 25', Feindouno 45'	5,000	
22 June 2008	Stade du 28 Septembre, Conakry (H)	Namibia	4–0	2010 FIFA World Cup qualification	Feindouno 32', Is. Bangoura 36', 54', 58'	15,000	
7 September 2008	Rufaro Stadium, Harare (A)	Zimbabwe	0–0	2010 FIFA World Cup qualification		23,000	
9 September 2008	Super Stadium, Atteridgeville (A)	South Africa	1–0	Friendly	A. Camara 18'		
12 October 2008	Stade du 28 Septembre, Conakry (H)	Kenya	3–2	2010 FIFA World Cup qualification	Is. Bangoura 31', Bah 51', Zayatte 80'	16,400	
11 February 2009	Stade Robert Bobin, Bondoufle (N)	Cameroon	1–3	Friendly	Feindouno 81'		
28 March 2009	Stade du 4-Août, Ouagadougou (A)	Burkina Faso	2–4	2010 FIFA World Cup qualification	Feindouno 65' pen., Zayatte 86'	30,000	
7 June 2009	Stade du 28 Septembre, Conakry (H)	Ivory Coast	1–2	2010 FIFA World Cup qualification	S. Bangoura 65'	14,000	
14 June 2009	Estádio José Gomes, Amadora (N)	Angola	0–0	Friendly			
21 June 2009	Stade du 28 Septembre, Conakry (H)	Malawi	2–1	2010 FIFA World Cup qualification	Feindouno 25', 43'	14,000	
12 August 2009	International Stadium, Cairo (A)	Egypt	3–3	Friendly	Youla 30', 41', Diawara 47'		
5 September 2009	Kamuzu Stadium, Blantyre (A)	Malawi	1–2	2010 FIFA World Cup qualification	Kalabane 38'	15,000	
11 October 2009	Ohene Djan Stadium, Accra (Note: Due to security concerns arising from the 2009 Guinea protest, the match was moved to Accra, Ghana.) (N)	Burkina Faso	1–2	2010 FIFA World Cup qualification	Bah 82'	5,000	
14 November 2009	Stade Félix Houphouët-Boigny, Abidjan (A)	Ivory Coast	0–3	2010 FIFA World Cup qualification		28,000	
11 August 2010	Stade Antoine de Saint-Exupéry, Marignane (N)	Mali	2–0	Friendly	Constant 34', Zayatte 52'		
5 September 2010	Addis Ababa Stadium, Addis Ababa (A)	Ethiopia	4–1	2012 Africa Cup of Nations qualification	I. Yattara 37', Kalabane 45+1', K. Cissé 61', Zayatte 75'	20,000	
10 October 2010	Stade du 28 Septembre, Conakry (H)	Nigeria	1–0	2012 Africa Cup of Nations qualification	Constant 5'	25,000	
17 November 2010	Stade Aimé Bergeal, Mantes-la-Ville (N)	Burkina Faso	2–1	Friendly	Cissé 10'	1,500	
9 February 2011	(A)	Senegal	0–3	Friendly		5,000	
27 March 2011	Mahamasina Municipal Stadium, Antananarivo (A)	Madagascar	1–1	2012 Africa Cup of Nations qualification	Bah 80'		
5 June 2011	Stade du 28 Septembre, Conakry (H)	Madagascar	4–1	2012 Africa Cup of Nations qualification	Kalabane 6', I. Bangoura 17', S. Diallo 60', Baldé 62'		
10 August 2011	(N)	Gabon	1–1	Friendly	S. Diallo 73'		
4 September 2011	Stade du 28 Septembre, Conakry (H)	Ethiopia	1–0	2012 Africa Cup of Nations qualification	Baldé 32'	35,000	
6 September 2011	Olympic Stadium, Caracas (A)	Venezuela	1–2	Friendly	A. Camara 79' pen.	14,000	
8 October 2011	Moshood Abiola National Stadium, Abuja (A)	Nigeria	2–2	2012 Africa Cup of Nations qualification	I. Bangoura 63', Traoré 90'	25,000	
11 November 2011	FRA	Senegal	1–4	Friendly	Feindouno 89' pen.		
15 November 2011	FRA	Burkina Faso	1–1	Friendly	Conté 90'		
24 January 2012	Stade de Franceville, Franceville (N)	Mali	0–1	2012 Africa Cup of Nations		10,000	
28 January 2012	Stade de Franceville, Franceville (N)	Botswana	6–1	2012 Africa Cup of Nations	S. Diallo 15', 27', A. Camara 42', Traoré 45', Bah 84', N. Soumah 86'	2,000	
1 February 2012	Stade de Franceville, Franceville (N)	Ghana	1–1	2012 Africa Cup of Nations	A. Camara 45+2'	5,500	
29 February 2012	CIV	Ivory Coast	0–0	Friendly			
3 June 2012	National Sports Stadium, Harare (A)	Zimbabwe	1–0	2014 FIFA World Cup qualification	Traoré 27'	30,000	
10 June 2012	Stade du 28 Septembre, Conakry (H)	Egypt	2–3	2014 FIFA World Cup qualification	A. Camara 20' pen., L. Bangoura 88'	14,000	
15 August 2012	MAR	Morocco	2–1	Friendly	M.Mara 12', I.Bangoura 25'	5,000	
9 September 2012	GUI	Niger	1–0	2013 Africa Cup of Nations qualification	M. Yattara 50'	25,000	
14 October 2012	NIG	Niger	0–2	2013 Africa Cup of Nations qualification		35,000	
2 December 2012	GUI	Sierra Leone	0–0	2014 African Nations Championship qualification			
15 December 2012	SLE	Sierra Leone	1–1	2014 African Nations Championship qualification	N.Kéita 48'		
24 March 2013	Estádio do Zimpeto, Maputo (A)	Mozambique	0–0	2014 FIFA World Cup qualification		25,000	
9 June 2013	Stade du 28 Septembre, Conakry (H)	Mozambique	6–1	2014 FIFA World Cup qualification	M. Yattara 15', 90', S. Diallo 33', 45' pen., Traoré 76', Diarra 81'	14,000	
16 June 2013	Stade du 28 Septembre, Conakry (H)	Zimbabwe	1–0	2014 FIFA World Cup qualification	M. Yattara 37'	14,000	
6 July 2013	MLI	Mali	1–3	2014 African Nations Championship qualification	S.Bangoura 7' pen.		
28 July 2013	GUI	Mali	1–0	2014 African Nations Championship qualification	I.Camara 62'		
14 August 2013	Mustapha Tchaker Stadium, Blida (A)	Algeria	2–2	Friendly	Cissé 56', 61'	29,000	
10 September 2013	El Gouna Stadium, El Gouna (A)	Egypt	2–4	2014 FIFA World Cup qualification	El-Abd 4' o.g., S. Soumah 57'	300	
5 March 2014	Azadi Stadium, Tehran (A)	Iran	2–1	Friendly	Constant 34', Traoré 37'	4,000	
25 May 2014	Stade Yves-du-Manoir, Colombes (N)	Mali	2–1	Friendly	Landel 28', M. Yattara 70' pen.	1,500	
5 September 2014	Stade Mohammed V, Casablanca (N) (Note: Guinea played their group stage home matches outside of the country due to the 2014 West Africa Ebola virus outbreak.)	Togo	2–1	2015 Africa Cup of Nations qualification	S. Soumah 11' pen., I. Sylla 44'		
10 September 2014	Mandela National Stadium, Kampala (A)	Uganda	0–2	2015 Africa Cup of Nations qualification			
11 October 2014	Stade Mohammed V, Casablanca (N)	Ghana	1–1	2015 Africa Cup of Nations qualification	Traoré 81'		
15 October 2014	Tamale Stadium, Tamale (A)	Ghana	1–3	2015 Africa Cup of Nations qualification	M. Yattara 34'		
15 November 2014	Stade de Kégué, Lomé (A)	Togo	4–1	2015 Africa Cup of Nations qualification	I. Sylla 17', S. Soumah 39', 60', 66'		
19 November 2014	Stade Mohammed V, Casablanca (N)	Uganda	2–0	2015 Africa Cup of Nations qualification	Traoré 23', S. Soumah 61' pen.		
20 January 2015	Estadio de Malabo, Malabo (N)	Ivory Coast	1–1	2015 Africa Cup of Nations	M. Yattara 36'	14,875	
24 January 2015	Estadio de Malabo, Malabo (N)	Cameroon	1–1	2015 Africa Cup of Nations	Traoré 42'	14,890	
28 January 2015	Estadio de Mongomo, Mongomo (N)	Mali	1–1	2015 Africa Cup of Nations	Constant 10' pen.	13,470	
1 February 2015	Estadio de Malabo, Malabo (N)	Ghana	0–3	2015 Africa Cup of Nations		14,500	
12 June 2015	MAR	Swaziland	1–2	2017 Africa Cup of Nations qualification	Kamano 67'	1,000	
22 June 2015	Stade du 26 Mars, Bamako (N)	Liberia	3–1	2016 African Nations Championship qualification	Se. Camara 8', 38', Sankhon 62'		
5 July 2015	Antoinette Tubman Stadium, Monrovia (A)	Liberia	1–1	2016 African Nations Championship qualification	A. Bangoura 58'		
6 September 2015	Rufaro Stadium, Harare (A)	Zimbabwe	1–1	2017 Africa Cup of Nations qualification	I. Sylla 1'		
9 October 2015	ALG	Algeria	2–1	Friendly	A. Bangoura 16', 39'	30,000	
12 October 2015	MAR	Morocco	1–1	Friendly	M. Yattara 21'	10,000	
17 October 2015	Stade du 26 Mars, Bamako (N)	Senegal	2–0	2016 African Nations Championship qualification	A.M. Sylla 6', A. Sylla 24'		
24 October 2015	Stade Demba Diop, Dakar (A)	Senegal	1–3	2016 African Nations Championship qualification	A. Bangoura 3'		
12 November 2015	NAM	Namibia	1–0	2018 FIFA World Cup qualification	N. Keïta 27'	2,000	
15 November 2015	MAR	Namibia	2–0	2018 FIFA World Cup qualification	I.Sylla 43', N. Keïta 79	1,000	
18 January 2016	Kigali Pelé Stadium, Kigali (N)	Tunisia	2–2	2016 African Nations Championship	A.Camara 40', 83'	7,000	
22 January 2016	Kigali Pelé Stadium, Kigali (N)	Niger	2–2	2016 African Nations Championship	A.Sylla 39', A. Bangoura 79'	4,500	
26 January 2016	Umuganda Stadium, Gisenyi (N)	Nigeria	1–0	2016 African Nations Championship	Sankhon 45'	3,000	
31 January 2016	Umuganda Stadium, Gisenyi (N)	Zambia	0–0 (5–4 p)	2016 African Nations Championship		4,966	
3 February 2016	Amahoro Stadium, Kigali (N)	DR Congo	1–1 (4–5 p)	2016 African Nations Championship	Sankhon 120'	18,000	
7 February 2016	Amahoro Stadium, Kigali (N)	Ivory Coast	1–2	2016 African Nations Championship	A.Camara 86'	22,000	
25 March 2016	GUI	Malawi	0–0	2017 Africa Cup of Nations qualification		20,000	
29 March 2016	MWL	Malawi	2–1	2017 Africa Cup of Nations qualification	M. Yattara 45', I.Sylla 60'	25,000	
5 June 2016	SWZ	Swaziland	0–1	2017 Africa Cup of Nations qualification		4,000	
30 August 2016	Borg El Arab Stadium, Amreya (A)	Egypt	1–1	Friendly	L. Bangoura 68'	5,000	
4 September 2016	GUI	Zimbabwe	1–0	2017 Africa Cup of Nations qualification	Landel 12'	10,000	
9 October 2016	Mustapha Ben Jannet Stadium, Monastir (A)	Tunisia	0–2	2018 FIFA World Cup qualification		6,000	
13 November 2016	Stade du 28 Septembre, Conakry (H)	DR Congo	1–2	2018 FIFA World Cup qualification	S. Soumah 23' pen.	30,000	
24 March 2017	Stade Océane, Le Havre (N)	Gabon	2–2	Friendly	Kamano 33', I. Sylla 87'	3,000	
28 March 2017	Edmond Machtens Stadium, Brussels (N)	Cameroon	2–1	Friendly	D. Camara 21', Kamano 45'	3,500	
6 June 2017	Mustapha Tchaker Stadium, Blida (A)	Algeria	1–2	Friendly	D. Camara 59'	10,000	
10 June 2017	Stade de la Paix, Bouaké (A)	Ivory Coast	3–2	2019 Africa Cup of Nations qualification	S. Diallo 31', Kamano 65', N. Keïta 79	15,000	
15 July 2017	Estádio 24 de Setembro, Bissau (A)	Guinea-Bissau	3–1	2018 African Nations Championship qualification	S.A. Camara 57', M.Camara 75', Sey. Camara 77' pen.	2,110	
22 July 2017	Stade du 28 Septembre, Conakry (H)	Guinea-Bissau	7–0	2018 African Nations Championship qualification	S.A. Camara 37', 66', 77', 87', N'Diaye 43', Sankhon 58', M. Diawara 83'	2,900	
15 August 2017	Stade Al Djigo, Pikine (A)	Senegal	1–3	2018 African Nations Championship qualification	M. Camara 71	2,500	
23 August 2017	Stade du 28 Septembre, Conakry (H)	Senegal	5–0	2018 African Nations Championship qualification	S.A. Camara 9', 57', 72', N'Diaye 31', Sankhon 39'	4,000	
31 August 2017	GUI	Libya	3–2	2018 FIFA World Cup qualification	N. Keïta 7', A.Camara 22', A. Bangoura 90'	13,750	
4 September 2017	TUN	Libya	0–1	2018 FIFA World Cup qualification		1,500	
7 October 2017	GUI	Tunisia	1–4	2018 FIFA World Cup qualification	N. Keïta 35'	12,000	
11 November 2017	COD	DR Congo	1–3	2018 FIFA World Cup qualification	K.Kéita 71'	3,000	
14 January 2018	Stade Mohammed V, Casablanca (N)	Sudan	1–2	2018 African Nations Championship	S.A. Camara 55'	9,000	
17 January 2018	Stade Mohammed V, Casablanca (N)	Morocco	1–3	2018 African Nations Championship	S.B. Camara 29'		
21 January 2018	Stade Mohammed V, Casablanca (N)	Mauritania	1–0	2018 African Nations Championship	Sankhon 15'		
24 March 2018	MTN	Mauritania	0–2	Friendly			
9 September 2018	Stade du 28 Septembre, Conakry (H)	Central African Republic	1–0	2019 Africa Cup of Nations qualification	S. Soumah 71'		
12 October 2018	Stade du 28 Septembre, Conakry (H)	Rwanda	2–0	2019 Africa Cup of Nations qualification	Kamano 37' pen., I. Cissé 69'		
16 October 2018	Kigali Pelé Stadium, Kigali (A)	Rwanda	1–1	2019 Africa Cup of Nations qualification	J. Kanté 32'		
18 November 2018	Stade du 28 Septembre, Conakry (H)	Ivory Coast	1–1	2019 Africa Cup of Nations qualification	M. Yattara 11'		
24 March 2019	Barthélemy Boganda Stadium, Bangui	Central African Republic	0–0	2019 Africa Cup of Nations qualification			
7 June 2019	MAR	Gambia	0–1	Friendly			
11 June 2019	MAR	Benin	0–1	Friendly			
16 June 2019	EGY	Egypt	1–3	Friendly	Kaba 63'	10,000	
22 June 2019	Alexandria Stadium, Alexandria (N)	Madagascar	2–2	2019 Africa Cup of Nations	Kaba 34', Kamano 66' pen.	5,342	
26 June 2019	Alexandria Stadium, Alexandria (N)	Nigeria	0–1	2019 Africa Cup of Nations		10,388	
30 June 2019	Al Salam Stadium, Cairo (N)	Burundi	2–0	2019 Africa Cup of Nations	M. Yattara 25', 52'	5,753	
7 July 2019	30 June Stadium, Cairo (N)	Algeria	0–1	2019 Africa Cup of Nations		8,205	
21 September 2019	Stade Léopold Sédar Senghor, Dakar (A)	Senegal	0–1	2020 African Nations Championship qualification		14,000	
12 October 2019	Stade de Montbauron, Versailles (N)	Comoros	0–1	Friendly		1,200	
15 October 2019	Estadio José Rico Pérez, Alicante (N)	Chile	2–3	Friendly	Conté 39', I. Camara 80'	200	
20 October 2019	Stade du 28 Septembre, Conakry (H)	Senegal	1–0 (3–1 p)	2020 African Nations Championship qualification	M. Bangoura 47'		
14 November 2019	MLI	Mali	2–2	2021 Africa Cup of Nations qualification	N. Keïta 66', S.Condé 75'		
17 November 2019	GUI	Namibia	2–0	2021 Africa Cup of Nations qualification	I.Sylla 41', J. Kanté 70'		
