= Senegal national football team results (2010–2019) =

This article provides details of international football games played by the Senegal national football team from 2010 to 2019.

== Results ==
=== 2010s ===
3 March 2010 Friendly	Greece	0–2	Senegal	Greece

10 May 2010 Friendly	Mexico	1–0	Senegal	United States

27 May 2010 Friendly	Denmark	2–0	Senegal	Denmark

11 August 2010 Friendly	Senegal	1–0	Cape Verde	Senegal

5 September 2010 2012 AFCONQ	DR Congo	2–4	Senegal	Lubumbashi, DR Congo
	Kabangu 42', 71'		Sow 6'; Niang 12', 22', 57' (pen.)	Stadium: Stade Frederic Kibassa Maliba; Attendance: 35,000; Referee: Djamel Hamoudi (Algeria)

9 October 2010 2012 AFCONQ	Senegal	7–0	Mauritius	Dakar, Senegal
				Stadium: Stade Léopold Sédar Senghor; Attendance: 50,000

28 October 2010 Friendly	Yemen	4–1	Senegal	Yemen

17 November 2010 Friendly	Senegal	2–1	Gabon	France

=== 2011 ===
9 February 2011 Friendly	Senegal	3–0	Guinea	Senegal

26 March 2011 2012 AFCONQ	Senegal	1–0	Cameroon	Dakar, Senegal
				Stadium: Stade Léopold Sédar Senghor

4 June 2011 2012 AFCONQ	Cameroon	0–0	Senegal	Yaoundé, Cameroon
				Stadium: Ahmadou Ahidjo Stadium

10 August 2011 Friendly	Senegal	0–2	Morocco	Senegal

3 September 2011 2012 AFCONQ	Senegal	2–0	DR Congo	Dakar, Senegal
				Stadium: Stade Léopold Sédar Senghor

9 October 2011 2012 AFCONQ	Mauritius	0–2	Zambia	Belle Vue Harel, Mauritius
				Stadium: Stade Anjalay

11 November 2011 Friendly	Senegal	4–1	Guinea	France

=== 2012 ===
12 January 2012 Friendly	Senegal	1–0	Sudan	Senegal

21 January 2012 2012 AFCON	Senegal	1–2	Zambia	Bata, Equatorial Guinea
				Stadium: Estadio de Bata

25 January 2012 2012 AFCON	Equatorial Guinea	2–1	Senegal	Bata, Equatorial Guinea
				Stadium: Estadio de Bata

29 January 2012 2012 AFCON	Libya	2–1	Senegal	Bata, Equatorial Guinea
				Stadium: Estadio de Bata

29 February 2012 Friendly	South Africa	0–0	Senegal	South Africa

25 May 2012 Friendly	Morocco	0–1	Senegal	Morocco

2 June 2012 2014 FIFA WCQ	Senegal	3–1	Liberia	Dakar, Senegal
	Baldé 33'; N'Doye 71'; Mané 83'		Doe 15'	Stadium: Stade Léopold Sédar Senghor; Attendance: 15,000; Referee: Noumandiez Doué (Ivory Coast)

9 June 2012 2014 FIFA WCQ	Uganda	1–1	Senegal	Kampala, Uganda
	Walusimbi 87' (pen.)		Cissé 37'	Stadium: Nelson Mandela National Stadium; Attendance: 30,000; Referee: Mohamed Benouza (Algeria)

8 September 2012 2013 AFCONQ	Ivory Coast	4–2	Senegal	Abidjan, Ivory Coast
				Stadium: Stade Félix Houphouët-Boigny

13 October 2012 2013 AFCONQ	Senegal	0–2	Ivory Coast	Dakar, Senegal
				Stadium: Stade Léopold Sédar Senghor

14 November 2012 Friendly	Niger	1–1	Senegal	Niger

=== 2013 ===
5 February 2013 Friendly	Guinea	1–1	Senegal	France

23 March 2013 2014 FIFA WCQ	Senegal	1–1	Angola	Conakry, Guinea
				Stadium: Stade du 28 Septembre

8 June 2013 2014 FIFA WCQ	Angola	1–1	Senegal	Luanda, Angola
				Stadium: Estádio 11 de Novembro

16 June 2013 2014 FIFA WCQ	Liberia	0–2	Senegal	Paynesville, Liberia
				Stadium: Samuel Kanyon Doe Sports Complex

14 August 2013 Friendly	Senegal	1–1	Zambia	France

7 September 2013 2014 FIFA WCQ	Senegal	1–0	Uganda	Marrakesh, Morocco
				Stadium: Marrakesh Stadium

12 October 2013 2014 FIFA WCQ	Ivory Coast	3–1	Senegal	Abidjan, Ivory Coast
				Stadium: Stade Félix Houphouët-Boigny

16 November 2013 2014 FIFA WCQ	Senegal	1–1	Ivory Coast	Casablanca, Morocco
				Stadium: Stade Mohammed V

=== 2014 ===
5 March 2014 Friendly	Senegal	1–1	Mali	Saint-Leu-la-Forêt, France
				Stadium: Stade Municipal

21 May 2014 Friendly	Burkina Faso	1–1	Senegal	Ouagadougou, Burkina Faso
				Stadium: Stade du 4 Août

31 May 2014 Friendly	Colombia	2–2	Senegal	Buenos Aires, Argentina
				Stadium: Estadio Pedro Bidegain

6 September 2014 2015 AFCONQ	Senegal	2–0	Egypt	Dakar, Senegal
				Stadium: Stade Léopold Sédar Senghor

10 September 2014 2015 AFCONQ	Botswana	0–2	Senegal	Gaborone, Botswana
				Stadium: Botswana National Stadium

10 October 2014 2015 AFCONQ	Senegal	0–0	Tunisia	Dakar, Senegal
				Stadium: Stade Léopold Sédar Senghor

15 October 2014 2015 AFCONQ	Tunisia	1–0	Senegal	Monastir, Tunisia
				Stadium: Stade Mustapha Ben Jannet

15 November 2014 2015 AFCONQ	Egypt	0–1	Senegal	Cairo, Egypt
				Stadium: Cairo International Stadium

19 November 2014 2015 AFCONQ	Senegal	3–0	Botswana	Dakar, Senegal
				Stadium: Stade Léopold Sédar Senghor

=== 2015 ===
9 January 2015 Friendly	Senegal	1–0	Gabon	Casablanca, Morocco
				Stadium: Stade Mohamed V

13 January 2015 Friendly	Senegal	5–2	Guinea	Casablanca, Morocco
				Stadium: Stade Larbi Benbarek

19 January 2015 2015 AFCON	Ghana	1–2	Senegal	Mongomo, Equatorial Guinea
				Stadium: Estadio de Mongomo

23 January 2015 2015 AFCON	South Africa	1–1	Senegal	Mongomo, Equatorial Guinea
				Stadium: Estadio de Mongomo

27 January 2015 2015 AFCON	Senegal	0–2	Algeria	Malabo, Equatorial Guinea
				Stadium: Estadio de Malabo

28 March 2015 Friendly	Ghana	1–2	Senegal	Le Havre, France
20:45	Boakye 84'		Konaté 66', 76'	Stadium: Stade Océane

13 June 2015 2017 AFCONQ	Senegal	3–1	Burundi	Dakar, Senegal
	Konaté 14' (pen.); Diouf 62'; Mané 90'		Abdul Razak 58'	Stadium: Stade Léopold Sédar Senghor; Referee: Mahamadou Keita (Mali)

20 June 2015 2016 CHANQ	Senegal	3–1	Gambia	Dakar, Senegal
				Stadium: Stade Demba Diop

4 July 2015 2016 CHANQ	Gambia	0–1	Senegal	Bakau, Gambia
				Stadium: Independence Stadium

5 September 2015 2017 AFCONQ	Namibia	0–2	Senegal	Windhoek, Namibia
			Kouyaté 35'; Mané 56'	Stadium: Sam Nujoma Stadium; Referee: Wellington Kaoma (Zambia)

13 October 2015 Friendly	Algeria	1–0	Senegal	Algeria

17 October 2015 2016 CHANQ	Guinea	2–0	Senegal	Bamako, Mali
				Stadium: Stade du 26 Mars

24 October 2015 2016 CHANQ	Senegal	3–1	Guinea	Dakar, Senegal
				Stadium: Stade Demba Diop

13 November 2015 2018 FIFA WCQ	Madagascar	2–2	Senegal	Antananarivo, Madagascar
		Report		Stadium: Mahamasina Municipal Stadium

17 November 2015 2018 FIFA WCQ	Senegal	3–0	Madagascar	Dakar, Senegal
		Report		Stadium: Stade Léopold Sédar Senghor

=== 2016 ===
26 March 2016 2017 AFCONQ	Senegal	2–0	Niger	Dakar, Senegal
	Diamé 16'; Niasse 68'			Stadium: Stade Léopold Sédar Senghor; Referee: Mohamed Ragab Omar (Libya)

29 March 2016 2017 AFCONQ	Niger	1–2	Senegal	Niamey, Niger
	Adebayor 67' (pen.)		Konaté 22' (pen.); Souaré 43'	Stadium: Stade Général Seyni Kountché; Referee: Mohamed Benouza (Algeria)

28 May 2016 Friendly	Rwanda	0–2	Senegal	Rwanda

4 June 2016 2017 AFCONQ	Burundi	0–2	Senegal	Bujumbura, Burundi
			Mané 16'; Diouf 42'	Stadium: Prince Louis Rwagasore Stadium; Referee: Bernard Camille (Seychelles)

3 September 2016 2017 AFCONQ	Senegal	2–0	Namibia	Dakar, Senegal
	Keita 32'; Diedhiou 90' (pen.)			Stadium: Stade Léopold Sédar Senghor; Referee: Bienvenu Sinko (Ivory Coast)

8 October 2016 2018 FIFA WCQ	Senegal	2–0	Cape Verde	Dakar, Senegal
		Report		Stadium: Stade Léopold Sédar Senghor

12 November 2016 2018 FIFA WCQ	South Africa	2–1; Annulled (Note: On 6 September 2017, the Bureau for the FIFA World Cup Qualifiers annulled the result of the South Africa v Senegal match on 12 November 2016 and ordered that it be replayed within the November 2017 international window. This decision was confirmed by the Organising Committee for FIFA Competitions on 14 September 2017. Originally South Africa had defeated Senegal 2–1. Match referee Joseph Lamptey was banned for life by the FIFA Disciplinary Committee on 20 March 2017 for "unlawfully influencing" the match after issuing a penalty for handball against Senegal. The decision was upheld by the FIFA Appeal Committee, and later the Court of Arbitration for Sport on 6 September 2017.)	Senegal	Polokwane, South Africa
15:00 UTC+2	Hlatshwayo 42' (pen.); Serero 45'	Report	N'Doye 75'	Stadium: Peter Mokaba Stadium; Attendance: 26,179; Referee: Joseph Lamptey (Ghana)

=== 2017 ===
8 January 2017 Friendly	Senegal	2–1	Libya	Congo

11 January 2017 Friendly	Congo	0–2	Senegal	Congo

15 January 2017 2017 AFCON	Tunisia	0–2	Senegal	Franceville, Gabon
				Stadium: Stade de Franceville

19 January 2017 2017 AFCON	Senegal	2–0	Zimbabwe	Franceville, Gabon
				Stadium: Stade de Franceville

23 January 2017 2017 AFCON	Senegal	2–2	Algeria	Franceville, Gabon
				Stadium: Stade de Franceville

28 January 2017 2017 AFCON	Senegal	0–0	Cameroon	Franceville, Gabon
				Stadium: Stade de Franceville

23 March 2017 Friendly	Nigeria	1–1	Senegal	England

27 March 2017 Friendly	Ivory Coast	1–1	Senegal	France

5 June 2017 Friendly	Senegal	0–0	Uganda	Senegal

10 June 2017 2019 AFCONQ	Senegal	3–0	Equatorial Guinea	Dakar, Senegal
21:00 UTC+0	Sow 1', 72'; Gueye 90'			Stadium: Stade Léopold Sédar Senghor; Referee: Rédouane Jiyed (Morocco)

15 July 2017 2018 CHANQ	Sierra Leone	1–1	Senegal	Freetown, Sierra Leone
	Fofanah 63'		Diop 85' (pen.)	Stadium: National Stadium; Referee: Manuel Timas (Cape Verde)

22 July 2017 2018 CHANQ	Senegal	3–1	Sierra Leone	Dakar, Senegal
	A. D. N'Diaye 4'; Ndao 51'; Diémé 65'		Fullah 5'	Stadium: Stade Al Djigo; Referee: Gilberto dos Santos (Guinea-Bissau)

15 August 2017 2018 CHANQ	Senegal	3–1	Guinea	Dakar, Senegal
	A. D. N'Diaye 14', 70'; Mbodj 83'		M. S. Camara 67'	Stadium: Stade Al Djigo; Referee: Ferdinand Udoh (Nigeria)

23 August 2017 2018 CHANQ	Guinea	5–0	Senegal	Conakry, Guinea
	S. A. Camara 9', 57', 77'; M. N'Diaye 31'; Sankhon 45'			Stadium: Stade du 28 Septembre; Referee: Mahamadou Keita (Mali)

2 September 2017 2018 FIFA WCQ	Senegal	0–0	Burkina Faso	Dakar, Senegal
		Report		Stadium: Stade Léopold Sédar Senghor

5 September 2017 2018 FIFA WCQ	Burkina Faso	2–2	Senegal	Ouagadougou, Burkina Faso
		Report		Stadium: Stade du 4 Août

7 October 2017 2018 FIFA WCQ	Cape Verde	0–2	Senegal	Praia, Cape Verde
		Report		Stadium: Estádio Nacional de Cabo Verde

10 November 2017 2018 FIFA WCQ	South Africa	0–2	Senegal	Polokwane, South Africa
		Report	Mané 38'; Mkhize (o.g.)	Stadium: Peter Mokaba Stadium

14 November 2017 2018 FIFA WCQ	Senegal	2–1	South Africa	Dakar, Senegal
		Report		Stadium: Stade Léopold Sédar Senghor

=== 2018 ===
23 March 2018 Friendly	Senegal	1–1	Uzbekistan	Casablanca, Morocco
				Stadium: Stade Mohamed V

27 March 2018 Friendly	Senegal	0–0	Bosnia and Herzegovina	Le Havre, France
				Stadium: Stade Océane

31 May 2018 Friendly	Luxembourg	0–0	Senegal	Luxembourg City, Luxembourg
				Stadium: Stade Josy Barthel

8 June 2018 Friendly	Croatia	2–1	Senegal	Osijek, Croatia

11 June 2018 Friendly	Senegal	2–0	South Korea	Grödig, Austria

19 June 2018	Poland	1–2	Senegal	Moscow, Russia
18:00 UTC+3	Krychowiak 86'	Report	Cionek 37' (o.g.); Niang 60'	Stadium: Otkritie Arena; Attendance: 44,190; Referee: Nawaf Shukralla (Bahrain)

24 June 2018	Japan	2–2	Senegal	Yekaterinburg, Russia
20:00 UTC+5	Inui 34'; Honda 78'	Report	Mané 11'; Wagué 71'	Stadium: Central Stadium; Attendance: 32,572; Referee: Gianluca Rocchi (Italy)

28 June 2018	Senegal	0–1	Colombia	Samara, Russia
18:00 UTC+4		Report	Mina 74'	Stadium: Cosmos Arena; Attendance: 41,970; Referee: Milorad Mažić (Serbia)

9 September 2018 2019 AFCONQ	Madagascar	2–2	Senegal	Antananarivo, Madagascar
14:30 UTC+3	Voavy 43'; Koulibaly 67' (o.g.)		Konaté 26'; Keita 62'	Stadium: Mahamasina Municipal Stadium; Referee: Joshua Bondo (Botswana)

13 October 2018 2019 AFCONQ	Senegal	3–0	Sudan	Dakar, Senegal
19:00 UTC+0	Cissé 17'; Gueye 18'; Niang 50'			Stadium: Stade Léopold Sédar Senghor; Referee: Bamlak Tessema Weyesa (Ethiopia)

16 October 2018 2019 AFCONQ	Sudan	0–1	Senegal	Khartoum, Sudan
19:30 UTC+2			S. Sarr 86'	Stadium: Khartoum Stadium; Referee: Mustapha Ghorbal (Algeria)

17 November 2018 2019 AFCONQ	Equatorial Guinea	0–1	Senegal	Bata, Equatorial Guinea
16:00 UTC+1			Meseguer 52' (o.g.)	Stadium: Estadio de Bata; Referee: Mahmoud El Banna (Egypt)

=== 2019 ===
23 March 2019 2019 AFCONQ	Senegal	2–0	Madagascar	Thiès, Senegal
19:00 UTC+0	Niang 27', 56'			Stadium: Stade Lat-Dior; Referee: Youssef Essrayri (Tunisia)

26 March 2019 Friendly	Senegal	2–1	Mali	Dakar, Senegal

10 June 2019 Friendly	Brazil	1–1	Senegal	Kallang, Singapore
				Stadium: National Stadium

23 June 2019 2019 AFCON	Senegal	2–0	Tanzania	Cairo, Egypt
19:00	Keita 28'; Diatta 64'			Stadium: 30 June Stadium; Attendance: 7,249; Referee: Sadok Selmi (Tunisia)

27 June 2019 2019 AFCON	Senegal	0–1	Algeria	Cairo, Egypt
19:00			Belaïli 49'	Stadium: 30 June Stadium; Attendance: 25,765; Referee: Janny Sikazwe (Zambia)

1 July 2019 2019 AFCON	Kenya	0–3	Senegal	Cairo, Egypt
21:00			Sarr 63'; Mané 71', 78' (pen.)	Stadium: 30 June Stadium; Attendance: 13,224; Referee: Gehad Grisha (Egypt)

5 July 2019 2019 AFCON	Uganda	0–1	Senegal	Cairo, Egypt
				Stadium: Cairo International Stadium

10 July 2019 2019 AFCON	Senegal	1–0	Benin	Cairo, Egypt
				Stadium: 30 June Stadium

14 July 2019 2019 AFCON	Senegal	1–0	Tunisia	Cairo, Egypt
				Stadium: 30 June Stadium

19 July 2019 2019 AFCON	Senegal	0–1	Algeria	Cairo, Egypt
				Stadium: Cairo International Stadium

28 July 2019	Liberia	1–0	Senegal	Monrovia, Liberia
				Stadium: Antoinette Tubman Stadium

3 August 2019	Senegal	3–0	Liberia	Dakar, Senegal
				Stadium: Stade Léopold Sédar Senghor

21 September 2019	Senegal	1–0	Guinea	Dakar, Senegal
				Stadium: Stade Léopold Sédar Senghor

20 October 2019	Guinea	1–0 (3–1 p)	Senegal	Conakry, Guinea
				Stadium: Stade du 28 Septembre

13 November 2019 2021 AFCONQ	Senegal	2–0	Congo	Senegal

17 November 2019 2021 AFCONQ	Eswatini	1–4	Senegal	Eswatini
