= 2018 African Nations Championship qualification =

Tournament details
- Dates: 22 April – 12 November 2017
- Teams: 48 (from 1 confederation)

Tournament statistics
- Matches played: 65
- Goals scored: 152 (2.34 per match)
- Top scorer(s): (Guinea) Sékou Amadou Camara (8 goals)

The 2018 African Nations Championship qualification was a men's football competition which decided the participating teams of the 2018 African Nations Championship. Only national team players who were playing in their country's own domestic league were eligible to compete in the tournament.

A total of sixteen teams qualified to play in the final tournament.

== Teams ==
A total of 48 (out of 54) CAF member national teams entered the qualifying rounds, split into zones according to their regional affiliations.

Zone	Spots	Teams entering qualification	Did not enter
North Zone (UNAF)	2 spots	Algeria; Egypt; **Libya**; **Morocco** (hosts)	Tunisia
West A Zone (WAFU-UFOA A)	2 spots	Gambia; **Guinea**; Guinea-Bissau; Liberia; Mali; **Mauritania**; Senegal; Sierra Leone	Cape Verde
West B Zone (WAFU-UFOA B)	3 spots	Benin; **Burkina Faso**; Ghana; **Ivory Coast**; Niger; **Nigeria**; Togo	
Central Zone (UNIFFAC)	3 spots	**Cameroon**; **Congo**; DR Congo; **Equatorial Guinea**; Gabon; São Tomé and Príncipe	Chad (disqualified); Central African Republic (disqualified)
Central-East Zone (CECAFA)	3 spots	Burundi; Djibouti; Ethiopia; **Rwanda**; Somalia; South Sudan; **Sudan**; Tanzania; **Uganda**	Eritrea; Kenya (original hosts)
South Zone (COSAFA)	3 spots	**Angola**; Botswana; Comoros; Lesotho; Madagascar; Malawi; Mauritius; Mozambique; **Namibia**; Seychelles; South Africa; Swaziland; **Zambia**; Zimbabwe	
Total	16 spots	48 teams	

Notes

- Teams in **bold** qualified for the final tournament.
- Central African Republic were excluded by the CAF from participating because of their withdrawal against DR Congo in the 2016 African Nations Championship qualification.
- Chad withdrew on 27 March 2016, but however, on 24 May 2016, Chad announced that they would not be able to qualify for CHAN 2018, and São Tomé and Príncipe officially entered the qualification, along with Equatorial Guinea.
- Egypt were expected to withdraw from the CHAN 2018, but however, on 4 June 2016, it was announced that Egypt would participate in the CHAN 2018 qualification.
- On 12 March 2017, the Football Association of Malawi announced their senior national football team would withdraw from the competition due to the lack of funding. However, they later announced its reversal of this decision and would continue to compete.
- Kenya were the original hosts and would have qualified automatically. However, on 23 September 2017, the CAF decided to withdraw their hosting rights due to a lack of progress with preparations.
- Morocco were named as the new hosts on 14 October 2017. Since they had already qualified in the North Zone, their spot in the final tournament was re-allocated to Egypt, which lost to Morocco in the North Zone final qualifying round. However, Egypt declined to participate citing a "congested domestic calendar". As a result, the spot was reverted to Central-East Zone (as originally three teams would participate including Kenya as original hosts), and would go to the winner of a play-off between Ethiopia and Rwanda, the two teams which lost in the Central-East Zone final qualifying round.

== Schedule ==
The draw was held on 3 February 2017 at Libreville, Gabon.

The schedule of the qualifying rounds was as follows.

Zone / Round			Matchday	Date
North Zone Central Zone	West A Zone West B Zone	Central-East Zone South Zone	Matchday	Date
—	—	First round	First leg	20–22 April 2017
—	—	First round	Second leg	28–30 April 2017
—	First round	Second round	First leg	14–16 July 2017
—	First round	Second round	Second leg	21–23 July 2017
First round	Second round	Third round	First leg	11–13 August 2017
First round	Second round	Third round	Second leg	18–20 August 2017

== Format ==
Qualification ties were played on a home-and-away two-legged basis. If the aggregate score was tied after the second leg, the away goals rule would be applied, and if still level, the penalty shoot-out would be used to determine the winner (no extra time would be played).

== North Zone ==
- All four teams (Algeria, Egypt, Libya, Morocco) entered the first round.

=== First round ===
Winners qualify for 2018 African Nations Championship.

Team 1	Agg.	Team 2	1st leg	2nd leg
Egypt	2–4	Morocco	1–1	1–3
Algeria	2–3	Libya	1–2	1–1

13 August 2017
19:00 UTC+2

Egypt	1–1	Morocco
El-Sheikh 4' (pen.)	Report	Banoun 52'

Alexandria Stadium, Alexandria
Referee: Mohamed Ragab Omar (Libya)
18 August 2017
20:00 UTC+1

Morocco	3–1	Egypt
El Yamiq 51'; Makran 54'; Boulahroud 70' (pen.)	Report	Semmoumy 86' (o.g.)

Prince Moulay Abdellah Stadium, Rabat
Referee: Sadok Selmi (Tunisia)

Morocco won 4–2 on aggregate.

12 August 2017
20:45 UTC+1

Algeria	1–2	Libya
Darfalou 1'	Report	Rahmani 6' (o.g.); Ellafi 48'

Mohamed Hamlaoui Stadium, Constantine
Attendance: 13,000
Referee: Samir Guezzaz (Morocco)
18 August 2017
19:00 UTC+1

Libya	1–1	Algeria
Ellafi 45'	Report	Bendebka 23'

Stade Taïeb Mhiri, Sfax (Tunisia) (Note: Libya played their home leg in Tunisia due to the Libyan Civil War.)
Referee: Amin Mohamed Omar (Egypt)

Libya won 3–2 on aggregate.

== West A Zone ==
- All eight teams (Gambia, Guinea, Guinea-Bissau, Liberia, Mali, Mauritania, Senegal, Sierra Leone) entered the first round.

=== First round ===
Team 1	Agg.	Team 2	1st leg	2nd leg
Sierra Leone	2–4	Senegal	1–1	1–3
Guinea-Bissau	1–10	Guinea	1–3	0–7
Liberia	1–2	Mauritania	0–2	1–0
Gambia	0–4	Mali	0–0	0–4

15 July 2017
16:30 UTC+0

Sierra Leone	1–1	Senegal
Fofanah 63'	Report	Diop 85' (pen.)

National Stadium, Freetown
Referee: Manuel Timas (Cape Verde)
22 July 2017
17:00 UTC+0

Senegal	3–1	Sierra Leone
A. D. N'Diaye 4'; Ndao 51'; Diémé 65'	Report	Fullah 5'

Stade Al Djigo, Dakar
Referee: Gilberto dos Santos (Guinea-Bissau)

Senegal won 4–2 on aggregate.

15 July 2017
16:00 UTC+0

Guinea-Bissau	1–3	Guinea
Juca 68'	Report	S. B. Camara 57'; M. S. Camara 75'; S. A. Camara 77' (pen.)

Estádio 24 de Setembro, Bissau
Referee: Maudo Jallow (Gambia)
22 July 2017
16:30 UTC+0

Guinea	7–0	Guinea-Bissau
S. A. Camara 37', 67', 79', 90'; M. N'Diaye 40'; Sankhon 58'; Diawara 83'	Report

Stade du 28 Septembre, Conakry
Referee: George Rogers (Liberia)

Guinea won 10–1 on aggregate.

16 July 2017
16:00 UTC+0

Liberia	0–2	Mauritania
	Report	Dellahi 35'; Bagili 61'

Samuel Kanyon Doe Sports Complex, Monrovia
Referee: Baba Leno (Guinea)
23 July 2017
17:00 UTC+0

Mauritania	0–1	Liberia
	Report	Jackson 45'

Stade Municipal Zouérate, Zouérat
Referee: Boubou Traoré (Mali)

Mauritania won 2–1 on aggregate.

15 July 2017
16:30 UTC+0

Gambia	0–0	Mali
	Report

Independence Stadium, Bakau
Referee: Babacar Sarr (Mauritania)
22 July 2017
17:00 UTC+0

Mali	4–0	Gambia
Koné 64', 67', 81'; Niangadou 90'	Report

Stade Modibo Kéïta, Bamako
Referee: Nabil Boukhalfa (Algeria)

Mali won 4–0 on aggregate.

=== Second round ===
Winners qualify for 2018 African Nations Championship.

Team 1	Agg.	Team 2	1st leg	2nd leg
Senegal	3–6	Guinea	3–1	0–5
Mauritania	3–2	Mali	2–2	1–0

15 August 2017 (Note: The first leg between Senegal and Guinea was postponed to mid-week to avoid a clash with general assembly elections. The second leg was also postponed to mid-week as a result. It was originally to be played on 22 August, but was postponed to the next day due to heavy rain.)
17:00 UTC+0

Senegal	3–1	Guinea
A. D. N'Diaye 14', 70'; Mbodj 83'	Report	M. S. Camara 67'

Stade Al Djigo, Dakar
Referee: Ferdinand Udoh (Nigeria)
23 August 2017
16:00 UTC+0

Guinea	5–0	Senegal
S. A. Camara 9', 57', 77'; M. N'Diaye 31'; Sankhon 45'	Report

Stade du 28 Septembre, Conakry
Referee: Mahamadou Keita (Mali)

Guinea won 6–3 on aggregate.

12 August 2017
17:00 UTC+0

Mauritania	2–2	Mali
Gaye 11' (pen.); Samba 18'	Report	Konté 1'; Diarra 22'

Stade Olympique, Nouakchott
Referee: Sékou Ahmed Touré (Guinea)
19 August 2017
16:30 UTC+0

Mali	0–1	Mauritania
	Report	Moussa 28'

Stade Modibo Kéïta, Bamako
Referee: Ibrahim Nour El Din (Egypt)

Mauritania won 3–2 on aggregate.

== West B Zone ==
- Two teams (Benin, Togo) entered the first round.
- Five teams (Burkina Faso, Ghana, Ivory Coast, Niger, Nigeria) entered the second round.

=== First round ===
Team 1	Agg.	Team 2	1st leg	2nd leg
Togo	2–2 (7–8 p)	Benin	1–1	1–1

16 July 2017
15:00 UTC+0

Togo	1–1	Benin
Sewonou 47'	Report	Koukpo 43'

Stade de Kégué, Lomé
Referee: Abdoulaye Rhissa Almoustapha (Niger)
23 July 2017
16:00 UTC+1

Benin	1–1	Togo
Aboki 52'	Report	Sewonou 73'
Penalties
Houngbédji (penalty missed); Bouraima (penalty missed); Koukpo (penalty scored); Ogoulola (penalty missed); Adjanakou (penalty scored)	8–7	(penalty missed) Novon; (penalty missed) Ouro-Sama; (penalty missed) Bourahana; (penalty missed) Bassa-Djéri

Stade de l'Amitié, Cotonou
Referee: William Agbovi (Ghana)

2–2 on aggregate. Benin won 8–7 on penalties.

=== Second round ===
Winners qualify for 2018 African Nations Championship.

Team 1	Agg.	Team 2	1st leg	2nd leg
Benin	1–2	Nigeria	1–0	0–2
Niger	2–2 (a)	Ivory Coast	2–1	0–1
Burkina Faso	4–3	Ghana	2–2	2–1

13 August 2017
16:00 UTC+1

Benin	1–0	Nigeria
Seibou 89' (pen.)	Report

Stade de l'Amitié, Cotonou
Referee: Mustapha Ghorbal (Algeria)
19 August 2017
16:00 UTC+1

Nigeria	2–0	Benin
Ali 22'; Eduwo 47'	Report

Sani Abacha Stadium, Kano
Referee: Joaquin Esono (Equatorial Guinea)

Nigeria won 2–1 on aggregate.

13 August 2017
17:00 UTC+1

Niger	2–1	Ivory Coast
Seyni 44'; Garba 85' (pen.)	Report	Dosso 45+2'

Stade Général-Seyni-Kountché, Niamey
Referee: Juste Ephrem Zio (Burkina Faso)
19 August 2017
16:00 UTC+0

Ivory Coast	1–0	Niger
Sylla 90+7'	Report

Stade Robert Champroux, Abidjan
Referee: Hélder Martins de Carvalho (Angola)

2–2 on aggregate. Ivory Coast won on away goals.

12 August 2017
16:00 UTC+0

Burkina Faso	2–2	Ghana
Sylla 58'; Sawadogo 85'	Report	Adams 17' (pen.); Waja 65'

Stade du 4 Août, Ouagadougou
Referee: Issa Sy (Senegal)
20 August 2017
15:30 UTC+0

Ghana	1–2	Burkina Faso
Addo 61'	Report	Sylla 8'; Nikiema 28'

Baba Yara Stadium, Kumasi
Referee: Bienvenu Sinko (Ivory Coast)

Burkina Faso won 4–3 on aggregate.

== Central Zone ==
- All six teams (Cameroon, Congo, DR Congo, Equatorial Guinea, Gabon, São Tomé and Príncipe) entered the first round.

=== First round ===
Winners qualify for 2018 African Nations Championship.

Team 1	Agg.	Team 2	1st leg	2nd leg
Equatorial Guinea	w/o	Gabon	—	—
Congo	1–1 (a)	DR Congo	0–0	1–1
São Tomé and Príncipe	0–4	Cameroon	0–2	0–2

12 August 2017
17:00 UTC+1

Equatorial Guinea	Cancelled	Gabon
	Report

Estadio de Malabo, Malabo
Referee: Alhadi Mahamat (Chad)
19 August 2017
17:00 UTC+1

Gabon	Cancelled	Equatorial Guinea
	Report

Stade de l'Amitié Sino-Gabonaise, Libreville
Referee: Lazard Tsiba (DR Congo)

Equatorial Guinea won on walkover after Gabon withdrew prior to the first leg.

11 August 2017
15:30 UTC+1

Congo	0–0	DR Congo
	Report

Stade Municipal de Kintélé, Brazzaville
Referee: Jean Marc Ganamandji (Central African Republic)
19 August 2017
15:30 UTC+1

DR Congo	1–1	Congo
Mundele 35'	Report	Ngombe 39'

Stade des Martyrs, Kinshasa
Referee: Antoine Effa (Cameroon)

1–1 on aggregate. Congo won on away goals.

12 August 2017
15:00 UTC+0

São Tomé and Príncipe	0–2	Cameroon
	Report	Pangop 42'; Fosso 75' (pen.)

Estádio Nacional 12 de Julho, São Tomé
Referee: Kabanga Yannick Malala (DR Congo)
19 August 2017
14:00 UTC+1

Cameroon	2–0	São Tomé and Príncipe
Ngondji 53'; Bouli 60'	Report

Limbe Stadium, Limbe
Referee: Kokou Ognankotan Ntale (Togo)

Cameroon won 4–0 on aggregate.

== Central-East Zone ==
- Two teams (Somalia, South Sudan) entered the first round.
- Seven teams (Burundi, Djibouti, Ethiopia, Rwanda, Sudan, Tanzania, Uganda) entered the second round.

=== First round ===
Team 1	Agg.	Team 2	1st leg	2nd leg
Somalia	1–4	South Sudan	1–2	0–2

22 April 2017
16:00 UTC+3

Somalia	1–2	South Sudan
Amin 49'	Report	Moga 6'; Khamis 52'

El Hadj Hassan Gouled Aptidon Stadium, Djibouti City (Djibouti) (Note: Somalia played their home leg in Djibouti due to the Somali Civil War.)
Referee: Mfaume Ali Nassoro (Tanzania)
30 April 2017
16:30 UTC+3

South Sudan	2–0	Somalia
Wurube 53'; Moga 69'	Report

Juba Stadium, Juba
Referee: Brian Miiro (Uganda)

South Sudan won 4–1 on aggregate.

=== Second round ===
Team 1	Agg.	Team 2	1st leg	2nd leg
South Sudan	1–5	Uganda	0–0	1–5
Tanzania	1–1 (a)	Rwanda	1–1	0–0
Djibouti	w/o	Ethiopia	1–5	—
Burundi	0–1	Sudan	0–0	0–1

14 July 2017
16:30 UTC+3

South Sudan	0–0	Uganda
	Report

Juba Stadium, Juba
Referee: Idris Mehammed Osman (Eritrea)
22 July 2017
16:00 UTC+3

Uganda	5–1	South Sudan
Nsibambi 33'; Mucureezi 43', 49', 53', 57'	Report	Khamis 90'

Phillip Omondi Stadium, Kampala
Referee: Elly Ally Sasii (Tanzania)

Uganda won 5–1 on aggregate.

15 July 2017
16:00 UTC+3

Tanzania	1–1	Rwanda
Mao 42'	Report	Nshuti 20'

CCM Kirumba Stadium, Mwanza
Referee: Alier Michael James (South Sudan)
22 July 2017
15:30 UTC+2

Rwanda	0–0	Tanzania
	Report

Stade Régional Nyamirambo, Kigali
Referee: Brian Miiro (Uganda)

1–1 on aggregate. Rwanda won on away goals.

15 July 2017
15:00 UTC+3

Djibouti	1–5	Ethiopia
? 74'	Report	Getaneh 20', 50', 72', 90+1'; Mulualem 55'

El Hadj Hassan Gouled Aptidon Stadium, Djibouti City
Referee: Hassan Mohamed Hagi (Somalia)
23 July 2017
19:00 UTC+3

Ethiopia	Cancelled	Djibouti
	Report

Hawassa International Stadium, Awasa
Referee: Hafiz Abdelghani Alamen (Sudan)

Ethiopia won on walkover after Djibouti withdrew prior to the second leg.

23 July 2017 (Note: The first leg between Burundi and Sudan was postponed by a week to allow Sudan to travel to Burundi following the lifting of the suspension of the Sudan Football Association on 13 July. The second leg was also postponed by a week as a result.)
15:00 UTC+2

Burundi	0–0	Sudan
	Report

Prince Louis Rwagasore Stadium, Bujumbura
Referee: Zekarias Girma Fega (Ethiopia)
29 July 2017
20:00 UTC+3

Sudan	1–0	Burundi
Teiri 50'	Report

Al-Ubayyid Stadium, Al-Ubayyid
Referee: Samuel Uwikunda (Rwanda)

Sudan won 1–0 on aggregate.

=== Third round ===
Winners qualify for 2018 African Nations Championship.

Team 1	Agg.	Team 2	1st leg	2nd leg
Uganda	3–2	Rwanda	3–0	0–2
Ethiopia	1–2	Sudan	1–1	0–1

12 August 2017
16:00 UTC+3

Uganda	3–0	Rwanda
Mutyaba 14' (pen.), 25'; Nsibambi 51'	Report

St Mary's Stadium, Kampala
Referee: Pacifique Ndabihawenimana (Burundi)
19 August 2017
15:30 UTC+2

Rwanda	2–0	Uganda
Mukunzi 8'; Manzi 15'	Report

Stade Régional Nyamirambo, Kigali
Referee: Hafiz Abdelghani Alamen (Sudan)

Uganda won 3–2 on aggregate.

13 August 2017
16:00 UTC+3

Ethiopia	1–1	Sudan
Abdurahman 83'	Report	Teiri 76'

Hawassa International Stadium, Awasa
Referee: Alex Muhabi (Uganda)
19 August 2017
20:00 UTC+3

Sudan	1–0	Ethiopia
Saadeldin 48'	Report

Al-Ubayyid Stadium, Al-Ubayyid
Referee: Andrew Otieno (Kenya)

Sudan won 2–1 on aggregate.

=== Play-off ===
Winner qualifies for 2018 African Nations Championship (replacing the original hosts Kenya which would have qualified automatically).

Team 1	Agg.	Team 2	1st leg	2nd leg
Ethiopia	2–3	Rwanda	2–3	0–0

5 November 2017
16:00 UTC+3

Ethiopia	2–3	Rwanda
Aschalew 18'; Abubakher 65'	Report	Rutanga 55'; Hakizimana 78'; Biramahire 80'

Addis Ababa Stadium, Addis Ababa
Referee: Souleiman Ahmed Djama (Djibouti)
12 November 2017
15:30 UTC+2

Rwanda	0–0	Ethiopia
	Report

Stade Régional Nyamirambo, Kigali
Referee: Hassan Mohamed Hagi (Somalia)

Rwanda won 3–2 on aggregate.

== South Zone ==
- Four teams (Madagascar, Malawi, Mauritius, Seychelles) entered the first round.
- Ten teams (Angola, Botswana, Comoros, Lesotho, Mozambique, Namibia, South Africa, Swaziland, Zambia, Zimbabwe) entered the second round.

=== First round ===
Team 1	Agg.	Team 2	1st leg	2nd leg
Madagascar	2–0	Malawi	1–0	1–0
Mauritius	3–2	Seychelles	2–1	1–1

22 April 2017
14:30 UTC+3

Madagascar	1–0	Malawi
Raveloarisona 87'	Report

Stade Municipal de Mahamasina, Antananarivo
Referee: Andrew Otieno (Kenya)
29 April 2017
15:00 UTC+2

Malawi	0–1	Madagascar
	Report	Rakotoharimalala 46'

Bingu National Stadium, Lilongwe
Referee: Wisdom Chewe (Zambia)

Madagascar won 2–0 on aggregate.

22 April 2017
16:00 UTC+4

Mauritius	2–1	Seychelles
Jean 6'; Rasolofonirina 50'	Report	Manoo 77'

Stade Anjalay, Belle Vue Maurel
Referee: Andofetra Rakotojaona (Madagascar)
29 April 2017
16:30 UTC+4

Seychelles	1–1	Mauritius
Corallie 50'	Report	Dorza 15'

Stade Linité, Victoria
Referee: Victor Gomes (South Africa)

Mauritius won 3–2 on aggregate.

=== Second round ===
Team 1	Agg.	Team 2	1st leg	2nd leg
Madagascar	4–2	Mozambique	2–2	2–0
Mauritius	2–4	Angola	0–1	2–3
Comoros	2–1	Lesotho	2–0	0–1
Namibia	1–1 (5–4 p)	Zimbabwe	1–0	0–1
Botswana	0–3	South Africa	0–2	0–1
Swaziland	0–7	Zambia	0–4	0–3

16 July 2017
14:30 UTC+3

Madagascar	2–2	Mozambique
Rakotoharimalala 45', 51'	Report	Salomão 5'; Maninho 57'

Mahamasina Municipal Stadium, Antananarivo
Referee: Ali Adelaïd (Comoros)
23 July 2017
15:00 UTC+2

Mozambique	0–2	Madagascar
	Report	Bela 61'; Rakotoharimalala 90'

Estádio do Zimpeto, Maputo
Referee: Tirelo Mositwane (Botswana)

Madagascar won 4–2 on aggregate.

16 July 2017
15:30 UTC+4

Mauritius	0–1	Angola
	Report	Job 27' (pen.)

Stade Anjalay, Belle Vue Maurel
Referee: Thando Ndzandzeka (South Africa)
23 July 2017
16:30 UTC+1

Angola	3–2	Mauritius
Job 2'; Geraldo 44'; Vá 71'	Report	Pericots 12'; Édouard 45+1'

Estádio 11 de Novembro, Luanda
Referee: Nomore Murambiwa Musundire (Zimbabwe)

Angola won 4–2 on aggregate.

15 July 2017
15:00 UTC+3

Comoros	2–0	Lesotho
I. Youssouf 47'; Bacar 78'	Report

Stade de Moroni, Moroni
Referee: Ganesh Chutooree (Mauritius)
23 July 2017
15:00 UTC+2

Lesotho	1–0	Comoros
Koloti 10'	Report

Setsoto Stadium, Maseru
Referee: Andofetra Rakotojaona (Madagascar)

Comoros win 2–1 on aggregate.

16 July 2017
15:00 UTC+1

Namibia	1–0	Zimbabwe
Somaeb 47'	Report

Sam Nujoma Stadium, Windhoek
Referee: Dennis Nguluwe (Malawi)
23 July 2017
15:00 UTC+2

Zimbabwe	1–0	Namibia
Dube 39'	Report
Penalties
Chafa (penalty scored); Ncube (penalty scored); Tonha (penalty scored); Rusawo (penalty missed); Dauda (penalty scored)	4–5	(penalty scored) Shitembi; (penalty scored) Somaeb; (penalty scored) Hanamub; (penalty scored) Fredericks; (penalty scored) Heita

National Sports Stadium, Harare
Referee: Thulani Sibandze (Swaziland)

1–1 on aggregate. Namibia won 5–4 on penalties.

15 July 2017
15:30 UTC+2

Botswana	0–2	South Africa
	Report	Moon 31'; Motupa 86'

Francistown Stadium, Francistown
Referee: Wellington Kaoma (Zambia)
22 July 2017
15:00 UTC+2

South Africa	1–0	Botswana
Moon 13'	Report

Moruleng Stadium, Moruleng
Referee: Osiase Koto (Lesotho)

South Africa won 3–0 on aggregate.

16 July 2017
15:00 UTC+2

Swaziland	0–4	Zambia
	Report	Chama 17', 47' (pen.); Mwila 35'; Kapumbu 80'

Somhlolo National Stadium, Lobamba
Referee: Nelson Fred (Seychelles)
22 July 2017
15:00 UTC+2

Zambia	3–0	Swaziland
Shonga 3'; Mwila 35'; Silwimba 40'	Report

National Heroes Stadium, Lusaka
Referee: João Goma (Angola)

Zambia won 7–0 on aggregate.

=== Third round ===
Winners qualify for 2018 African Nations Championship.

Team 1	Agg.	Team 2	1st leg	2nd leg
Madagascar	0–1	Angola	0–0	0–1
Comoros	2–3	Namibia	2–1	0–2
South Africa	2–4	Zambia	2–2	0–2

13 August 2017
14:30 UTC+3

Madagascar	0–0	Angola
	Report

Stade Municipal de Mahamasina, Antananarivo
Referee: Ahmad Imtehaz Heeralall (Mauritius)
19 August 2017
16:30 UTC+1

Angola	1–0	Madagascar
Massunguna 68'	Report

Estádio 11 de Novembro, Luanda
Referee: Bamlak Tessema Weyesa (Ethiopia)

Angola won 1–0 on aggregate.

13 August 2017
15:00 UTC+3

Comoros	2–1	Namibia
Mradabi 41'; M. Youssouf 45+1'	Report	Somaeb 69' (pen.)

Stade de Moroni, Moroni
Referee: Christopher Harrison (South Africa)
20 August 2017
15:00 UTC+1

Namibia	2–0	Comoros
Katupose 55', 90+4'	Report

Sam Nujoma Stadium, Windhoek
Referee: Wisdom Chewe (Zambia)

Namibia won 3–2 on aggregate.

12 August 2017
15:00 UTC+2

South Africa	2–2	Zambia
Motupa 32'; Booysen 52'	Report	Phiri 59'; Shonga 90+4'

Buffalo City Stadium, East London
Referee: Jackson Pavaza (Namibia)
19 August 2017
15:00 UTC+2

Zambia	2–0	South Africa
Shonga 80', 83'	Report

Levy Mwanawasa Stadium, Ndola
Referee: Norman Matemera (Zimbabwe)

Zambia won 4–2 on aggregate.

== Qualified teams ==
The following 16 teams qualified for the final tournament.

Team	Qualifying zone	Qualified on	Previous appearances in African Nations Championship^{1}
Morocco (hosts)	North Zone	18 August 2017	2 (2014, 2016)
Libya	North Zone	18 August 2017	2 (2009, **2014**)
Guinea	West A Zone	23 August 2017	1 (2016)
Mauritania	West A Zone	19 August 2017	1 (2014)
Nigeria	West B Zone	19 August 2017	2 (2014, 2016)
Ivory Coast	West B Zone	19 August 2017	3 (2009, 2011, 2016)
Burkina Faso	West B Zone	20 August 2017	1 (2014)
Equatorial Guinea	Central Zone	9 August 2017	0 (debut)
Congo	Central Zone	19 August 2017	1 (2014)
Cameroon	Central Zone	19 August 2017	2 (2011, 2016)
Uganda	Central-East Zone	19 August 2017	3 (2011, 2014, 2016)
Sudan	Central-East Zone	19 August 2017	1 (2011)
Rwanda	Central-East Zone	12 November 2017	2 (2011, 2016)
Angola	South Zone	19 August 2017	2 (2011, 2016)
Namibia	South Zone	20 August 2017	0 (debut)
Zambia	South Zone	19 August 2017	2 (2009, 2016)

^{1} Bold indicates champions for that year. Italic indicates hosts for that year.

== Goalscorers ==
8 goals

- (Guinea) Sékou Amadou Camara

4 goals

- (Madagascar) Njiva Rakotoharimalala
- (Ethiopia) Getaneh Kebede
- (Uganda) Paul Mucureezi
- (Zambia) Justin Shonga

3 goals

- (Mali) Ibrahima Koné
- (Senegal) Amadou Dia N'Diaye

2 goals

- (Angola) Job
- (Burkina Faso) Mohamed Sydney Sylla
- (Guinea) Mohamed Sorel Camara
- (Guinea) Mohamed N'Diaye
- (Guinea) Ibrahima Sory Sankhon
- (Libya) Muaid Ellafi
- (Namibia) Muna Katupose
- (Namibia) Hendrik Somaeb
- (South Africa) Ryan Moon
- (South Africa) Gift Motupa
- (South Sudan) Leon Uso Khamis
- (South Sudan) James Moga
- (Sudan) Seif Teiri
- (Togo) Koidjo Sewonou
- (Uganda) Muzamiru Mutyaba
- (Uganda) Derrick Nsibambi
- (Zambia) Clatous Chama
- (Zambia) Brian Mwila

1 goal

- (Algeria) Sofiane Bendebka
- (Algeria) Oussama Darfalou
- (Angola) Geraldo
- (Angola) Dani Massunguna
- (Angola) Vá
- (Benin) Waris Aboki
- (Benin) Marcelin Koukpo
- (Benin) Mama Seibou
- (Burkina Faso) Herman Nikiema
- (Burkina Faso) Ilasse Sawadogo
- (Cameroon) Raphaël Messi Bouli
- (Cameroon) Raymond Fosso
- (Cameroon) Armel Lionel Ngondji
- (Cameroon) Franck Pangop
- (Comoros) Raidou Boina Bacar
- (Comoros) Chadhuli Mradabi
- (Comoros) Ibroihim Youssouf
- (Comoros) Mohamed Youssouf
- (Republic of the Congo) Jaures Ngombe
- (Djibouti) ?
- (Democratic Republic of the Congo) Jean-Marc Makusu Mundele
- (Egypt) Ahmed El Sheikh
- (Ethiopia) Aschalew Girma
- (Ethiopia) Mulualem Mesfin
- (Ethiopia) Abdurahman Mubarak
- (Ethiopia) Abubakher Sanni
- (Ghana) Sadick Adams
- (Ghana) Felix Addo
- (Ghana) Gideon Waja
- (Guinea) Seydouba Bissiri Camara
- (Guinea) Mamady Diawara
- (Guinea-Bissau) Juca
- (Ivory Coast) Fabius Dosso
- (Ivory Coast) Banfa Sylla
- (Lesotho) Raboama Koloti
- (Liberia) Christopher Jackson
- (Madagascar) Bela
- (Madagascar) Morelin Raveloarisona
- (Mali) Aboubacar Diarra
- (Mali) Mandala Konté
- (Mali) Gouné Niangadou
- (Mauritania) Boubacar Bagili
- (Mauritania) Mohamed Yaly Dellahi
- (Mauritania) Abdoulaye Sileye Gaye
- (Mauritania) Karamogho Moussa
- (Mauritania) Moussa Samba
- (Mauritius) Marco Dorza
- (Mauritius) Jonathan Édouard
- (Mauritius) Emmanuel Vincent Jean
- (Mauritius) Kevin Perticots
- (Mauritius) Francis Rasolofonirina
- (Morocco) Badr Banoun
- (Morocco) Badr Boulahroud
- (Morocco) Jawad El Yamiq
- (Morocco) Abderrahim Makran
- (Mozambique) Maninho
- (Mozambique) Salomão
- (Niger) Idrissa Halidou Garba
- (Niger) Imrana Seyni
- (Nigeria) Rabiu Ali
- (Nigeria) Kingsley Eduwo
- (Rwanda) Abeddy Biramahire
- (Rwanda) Muhadjiri Hakizimana
- (Rwanda) Thierry Manzi
- (Rwanda) Yannick Mukunzi
- (Rwanda) Dominique Savio Nshuti
- (Rwanda) Eric Rutanga
- (Senegal) Sidy Bara Diop
- (Senegal) Daouda Guèye Diémé
- (Senegal) Assane Mbodj
- (Senegal) Alassane Ndao
- (Seychelles) Leeroy Corallie
- (Seychelles) Yannick Manoo
- (Sierra Leone) Kemson Fofanah
- (Sierra Leone) Nathaniel Fullah
- (Somalia) Abas Amin Mohamed
- (Sudan) Elsamani Saadeldin
- (South Africa) Mario Booysen
- (South Sudan) Duku Wurube
- (Tanzania) Himid Mao
- (Zambia) Fackson Kapumbu
- (Zambia) Martin Phiri
- (Zambia) Simon Silwimba
- (Zimbabwe) Prince Dube

Own goals

- (Algeria) Chamseddine Rahmani (against Libya)
- (Morocco) Hamza Semmoumy (against Egypt)
