= Bangoura =

Bangoura (French spelling in Guinea) or "Bangura" (English spelling in Sierra Leone) is a typical surname of the Sosso people. According to oral tradition they are believed to be descendants of Fakoly Doumbia. The cousin of Soumaoro Kanté and the legendary general of the Mali Empire. While the surname heritage is primarily associated with the horon ruling class, numerous lineages among the Bangoura families famously belong to the djeli (Griot) caste.

Notable people with the surname include:

- Aboubacar Bangoura (disambiguation), several people
- Alhassane Bangoura (born 1992), Guinean football player
- Amara Bangoura, Guinean football player
- Boubacar Bangoura (born 1990), Malian football player
- Facinet Bangoura (born 1972), Guinean swimmer
- Fodé Bangoura, Guinean politician
- Ibrahima Bangoura (born 1982), Guinean football player
- Ismaël Bangoura (born 1985), Guinean football player
- Karim Bangoura (c. 1926–1972), Guinean diplomat
- Mahawa Bangoura (born 1927), Guinean politician, first woman foreign minister
- Momar Bangoura (born 1994), French football player
- Ousmane Bangoura (born 1979), Guinean football player
- Pathé Bangoura (born 1984), Guinean football player
- Sambégou Bangoura (born 1982), Guinean football player
- Sekou Tidiany Bangoura (born 2002), Guinean footballer
- Seydouba Bangoura, Guinean football player
