= Kames =

Kames may refer to:

People

- Henry Home, Lord Kames, Scottish philosopher
- Abdesalam Kames, Libyan footballer
- Bob Kames, American organist
- Kambūjia, otherwise Cambyses of Persia
- Kamose, last Egyptian pharaoh of the Seventeenth dynasty of Egypt

Places

- Kames, Argyll, Scotland

Other

- plural of kame, a glacial feature
