= Aboubacar Bangoura =

Aboubacar Bangoura is the name of:

- Aboubacar Bangoura (footballer) (born 1982), Guinean football player (goalkeeper)
- Aboubacar Bangoura (referee) (born 1977), Guinean football referee

== See also ==
- Bangoura (disambiguation), for other people with the name of Bangoura
