= Houngbédji =

Houngbédji is a surname. Notable people with the surname include:

- Adrien Houngbédji (born 1942), Beninese politician
- Gaston Houngbédji (born 1998), Beninese footballer
- Gatien Houngbédji (born 1949), Beninese politician
