= Maninho =

Mozambican international footballer (born 1991)

Personal information
- Full name: Manuel Fernandes
- Date of birth: 30 March 1991 (age 35)
- Position: Forward

Team information
- Current team: Ferroviário Beira

Senior career*
Years	Team	Apps	(Gls)
2008–2010	Liga Muçulmana		
2011–	Ferroviário Beira		

International career^{‡}
2009–	Mozambique	20	(3)
- * Club domestic league appearances and goals ‡ National team caps and goals as of 19 July 2017

Maninho (born 30 March 1991) is a Mozambican international footballer.

== International career ==
=== International goals ===
Scores and results list Mozambique's goal tally first.

No	Date	Venue	Opponent	Score	Result	Competition
1.	8 October 2011	Estádio da Machava, Maputo, Mozambique	Comoros	1–0	3–0	2012 Africa Cup of Nations qualification
2.	8 September 2013	Rufaro Stadium, Harare, Zimbabwe	Zimbabwe	1–1	1–1	2014 FIFA World Cup qualification
3.	16 July 2017	Mahamasina Municipal Stadium, Antananarivo, Madagascar	Madagascar	2–2	2–2	2018 African Nations Championship qualification
4.	4 August 2019	Estádio do Zimpeto, Maputo, Mozambique	Madagascar	2–0	3–2	2020 African Nations Championship qualification
