= Simon Silwimba =

Zambian footballer (born 1991)

Personal information
- Date of birth: 25 December 1991 (age 34)
- Place of birth: Lusaka, Zambia
- Height: 1.65 m (5 ft 5 in)
- Position: Right-back

Team information
- Current team: ZESCO United
- Number: 6

Senior career*
Years	Team	Apps	(Gls)
2010–2012	Zanaco F.C.		
2012–	ZESCO United		

International career^{‡}
2010–	Zambia	20	(1)
- * Club domestic league appearances and goals ‡ National team caps and goals as of 2 April 2021

Simon Silwimba (born 25 December 1991) is a Zambian footballer who plays as a defender for ZESCO United F.C. and the Zambia national football team.

== Career ==
=== International ===
Silwimba made his senior international debut on 31 December 2010 in a 4-0 friendly defeat to Kuwait. He scored his first international goal in 2017, finding the net in a 3–0 victory over Eswatini during African Nations Championship qualifying.

== Career statistics ==
=== International ===
As of matches played 19 October 2019.

National team	Year	Apps	Goals
Zambia	2010	1	0
Zambia	2016	3	0
Zambia	2017	7	1
Zambia	2018	4	0
Zambia	2019	5	0
Total		20	1

==== International Goals ====
Scores and results list Zambia's goal tally first.

Goal	Date	Venue	Opponent	Score	Result	Competition
1.	22 July 2017	National Heroes Stadium, Lusaka, Zambia	Eswatini	3–0	3–0	2018 CHAN qualification
