= Amadou Dia N'Diaye =

Senegalese footballer (born 2000)

Personal information
- Full name: Amadou Dia N'Diaye
- Date of birth: 2 January 2000 (age 26)
- Place of birth: Bambey, Senegal
- Height: 1.86 m (6 ft 1 in)
- Position: Forward

Team information
- Current team: Stade Tunisien
- Number: 80

Youth career
- Génération Foot

Senior career*
Years	Team	Apps	(Gls)
2017–2018	Génération Foot		
2018–2023	Metz	4	(1)
2019–2022	Metz B	12	(9)
2020	→ Sochaux (loan)	5	(0)
2020–2021	→ Seraing (loan)	19	(4)
2021–2022	→ Le Mans (loan)	14	(3)
2021–2022	→ Le Mans B (loan)	4	(3)
2023–2024	Xamax	15	(1)
2024–2025	Union de Touarga	28	(4)
2025-	Stade Tunisien	22	(7)

International career^{‡}
2019–2020	Senegal U20	9	(3)
2017	Senegal	5	(3)
- * Club domestic league appearances and goals as of 30 September 2024 ‡ National team caps and goals as of 30 September 2024

Amadou Dia N'Diaye (born 2 January 2000) is a Senegalese professional footballer who plays as a forward for Stade Tunisien. He has been capped for the Senegal national team.

== Club career ==
On 1 February 2023, N'Diaye signed with Xamax in Switzerland. On 22 January 2024, his contract with Xamax was terminated by mutual consent.

== Career statistics ==
=== International goals ===
Scores and results list Senegal's goal tally first, score column indicates score after each Dia N'Diaye goal.

List of international goals scored by Amadou Dia N'Diaye
No.	Date	Venue	Opponent	Score	Result	Competition
1	22 July 2017	Stade Al Djigo, Dakar, Senegal	Sierra Leone	1–0	3–1	2018 African Nations Championship qualification
2	15 August 2017	Stade Al Djigo, Dakar, Senegal	Guinea	1–0	3–1	2018 African Nations Championship
3	15 August 2017	Stade Al Djigo, Dakar, Senegal	Guinea	2–1	3–1	2018 African Nations Championship

== Honours ==
Senegal U20

- Africa U-20 Cup of Nations runner-up: 2019
