= Abderrahim Makran =

Moroccan footballer

Personal information
- Date of birth: 20 August 1994 (age 32)
- Place of birth: Nador, Morocco
- Height: 1.84 m (6 ft 0 in)
- Position: Forward

Senior career*
Years	Team	Apps	(Gls)
2015–2018	Chabab Rif Al Hoceima	58	(18)
2015–2016	→ AS Salé (loan)		
2018	→ Ittihad Kalba (loan)		
2018–2020	FUS		
2020-2021	Maghreb de Fès	3	(0)
2021	Hassania Agadir		
2021–2022	Al-Nasr Benghazi		
2022–2023	Al-Ittihad Salalah		
2023–2024	FC Nouadhibou		
2024–2025	Al-Salam		

International career^{‡}
2017–	Morocco	2	(1)
- * Club domestic league appearances and goals as of 1 July 2013 ‡ National team caps and goals as of 14 August 2019

Abderrahim Makran (Arabic: عبد الرحيم مقران, romanized: ‘Abd ar-Raḥmān Maqran) (born 11 June 1995 in Nador) is a Moroccan professional footballer who plays as a forward.

== Career statistics ==
Scores and results list Morocco's goal tally first.

No.	Date	Venue	Opponent	Score	Result	Competition
1.	18 August 2017	Prince Moulay Abdellah Stadium, Rabat, Morocco	Egypt	2–0	3–1	2018 African Nations Championship qualification
