= Herman Nikièma =

Burkinabé footballer (born 1988)

Personal information
- Date of birth: 30 November 1988 (age 37)
- Place of birth: Ouagadougou, Burkina Faso
- Position: Left-back

Team information
- Current team: Rail Club du Kadiogo

Senior career*
Years	Team	Apps	(Gls)
2013–2018	US Ouagadougou		
2018–2022	Salitas		
2022–2023	Douanes	4	(0)
2023–2024	Majestic	23	(0)
2024–2025	Étoile Filante	24	(0)
2025–	Rail Club du Kadiogo	19	(0)

International career^{‡}
2017–2021	Burkina Faso	7	(1)
- * Club domestic league appearances and goals as of 2 June 2026 ‡ National team caps and goals as of 2 June 2026

Herman Nikièma (born 30 November 1988) is a Burkinabé professional footballer who plays as a left-back for Rail Club du Kadiogo. He has also been capped for the Burkina Faso national team.

== Career ==
Born in Ouagadougou, he has played club football for US Ouagadougou.

He made his debut with the Burkina Faso national team in a 2–1 2018 African Nations Championship qualification win over Ghana on 20 August 2017.

== Career statistics ==
Scores and results list Burkina Faso's goal tally first.

No.	Date	Venue	Opponent	Score	Result	Competition
1.	12 August 2017	Baba Yara Stadium, Kumasi, Ghana	Ghana	2–0	2–1	2018 African Nations Championship qualification
