= Jaures Ngombe =

Congolese footballer

Personal information
- Full name: Jaures Maudsly Ngombe
- Date of birth: 22 May 1998 (age 28)
- Place of birth: Republic of the Congo
- Position: Forward

Team information
- Current team: AS Otohô

Senior career*
| Years | Team | Apps | (Gls) |
| 2016–2017 | Étoile du Congo | | |
| 2017–2018 | AS Otohô | | |
| 2018–2019 | CS Sfaxien | 0 | (0) |
| 2019– | AS Otohô | | |

International career
| 2017– | Congo | 6 | (1) |
- * Club domestic league appearances and goals

Jaures Maudsly Ngombe (born 22 May 1998) is a Congolese footballer currently playing for Congolese club AS Otohô in the Congo Premier League.

== International career ==
Ngombe made his international debut for Congo on August 11, 2017 during a 2018 African Nations Championship qualification match against DR Congo.

== Career statistics ==
=== International ===
As of matches played 4 January 2018.

| National team | Year | Apps | Goals |
|---|---|---|---|
| Congo | 2017 | 2 | 1 |
| Total | | 2 | 1 |

=== International goals ===
Scores and results list Congo's goal tally first.

| No | Date | Venue | Opponent | Score | Result | Competition |
|---|---|---|---|---|---|---|
| 1. | 19 August 2017 | Stade des Martyrs, Kinshasa, Congo DR | DR Congo | 1–1 | 1–1 | 2018 CHANQ |
