= Gouné Niangadou =

Malian association football player

Personal information
- Full name: Gouné Niangadou
- Date of birth: 28 January 1997 (age 29)
- Place of birth: Bamako, Mali
- Height: 1.82 m (6 ft 0 in)
- Position: Midfielder

Team information
- Current team: Antwerp
- Number: 11

Youth career
- Stade Malien

Senior career*
Years	Team	Apps	(Gls)
2016–2018	Stade Malien	?	(?)
2018–2020	Antwerp	10	(0)

International career^{‡}
2017	Mali	4	(1)
- * Club domestic league appearances and goals as of 29 July 2020 ‡ National team caps and goals as of 25 November 2018

Gouné Niangadou (born 28 December 1997) is a Malian footballer who plays as a midfielder for Antwerp.

== Professional career ==
On 19 January 2018, Niangadou joined Royal Antwerp F.C. Niangadou made his professional debut with Antwerp in a 3-3 Belgian First Division A tie with K.V. Oostende on 2 April 2018.

== International career ==
Niangadou represented the local Mali national football team for the 2018 African Nations Championship qualification, scoring 1 goal in 4 games.
