= Ryan Moon =

South African soccer player

Personal information
- Date of birth: 15 September 1996 (age 30)
- Place of birth: Pietermaritzburg, KwaZulu-Natal, South Africa
- Height: 1.80 m (5 ft 11 in)
- Position: Forward

Team information
- Current team: AmaZulu
- Number: 9

Youth career
- Woodlands FC
- Pirates FC
- –2016: Maritzburg United

Senior career*
Years	Team	Apps	(Gls)
2016	Maritzburg United	2	(0)
2016–2019	Kaizer Chiefs	32	(5)
2019–2021	Stellenbosch	35	(5)
2021	Varberg	25	(7)
2022–2025	Golden Arrows	54	(12)
2025–	AmaZulu	2	(0)

International career^{‡}
2017–2018	South Africa	8	(1)
- * Club domestic league appearances and goals as of 4 January 2026 ‡ National team caps and goals as of 14:10 20 November 2018 (UTC)

Ryan Moon (born 15 September 1996) is a South African soccer player who plays as a forward who plays for AmaZulu.

Moon has previously played for Maritzburg United and Kaizer Chiefs, and has represented South Africa internationally.

Moon was released by Kaizer Chiefs in 2019, when they declined an option on his contract. In June 2019 he trained with Scottish Premiership club Hibernian.

After spending the spring of 2022 as a free agent, Moon signed for Golden Arrows in June 2022.

== Career statistics ==
=== Club ===
As of 20 November 2018.

Club	Season	League			Cup		Continental		Other		Total	
Club	Season	Division	Apps	Goals	Apps	Goals	Apps	Goals	Apps	Goals	Apps	Goals
Maritzburg United	2015–16	ABSA Premiership	2	0	1 (Note: Appearances in the Nedbank Cup)	0	0	0	–		3	0
Kaizer Chiefs	2016–17	ABSA Premiership	6	1	0	0	0	0	–		6	1
Kaizer Chiefs	2017–18	ABSA Premiership	13	4	5 (Note: One appearance in the Telkom Knockout, four appearances and one goal in the Nedbank Cup)	1	0	0	–		14	4
Kaizer Chiefs	2018–19	ABSA Premiership	6	0	3 (Note: One appearance in the Telkom Knockout, two appearances in the MTN 8)	0	0	0	–		9	0
Kaizer Chiefs	Total		25	5	8	0	0	0	0	0	33	5
Career total			27	5	9	0	0	0	0	0	36	5

=== International ===
As of matches played 20 November 2018.

National team	Year	Apps	Goals
South Africa	2017	3	1
South Africa	2018	5	0
Total		8	1

=== International goals ===
Scores and results list South Africa's goal tally first.

No	Date	Venue	Opponent	Score	Result	Competition
1.	15 July 2017	Francistown Stadium, Francistown, Botswana	Botswana	1–0	2–0	2018 African Nations Championship qualification
