= Aboubacar Bangoura (footballer) =

Guinean former international footballer

Personal information
- Date of birth: 1 January 1982 (age 44)
- Place of birth: Guinea
- Position: Goalkeeper

Senior career*
Years	Team	Apps	(Gls)
2005–2006	AS Châteauneuf-Neuvic		
2009–2011	Royan Vaux AFC		

International career
2000–2006	Guinea	1	(0)
- * Club domestic league appearances and goals

Aboubacar Bangoura (born 1 January 1982) is a Guinean former international footballer who played as a goalkeeper. Bangoura represented Guinea at the 2006 Africa Cup of Nations. His first, and to date only, game for the Guinea national team was a 2:3 loss against Senegal at the African Nations Cup in 2006.
