= Amara Karba Bangoura =

Guinean footballer

Karba Bangoura
Personal information
- Full name: Amara Karba Bangoura
- Date of birth: 10 March 1986 (age 40)
- Place of birth: Kamsar, Guinea
- Height: 1.69 m (5 ft 7 in)
- Position: Midfielder

Youth career
- Hafia

Senior career*
Years	Team	Apps	(Gls)
2004–2006	Hafia	?	(?)
2006–2008	OC Khouribga	4	(0)
2008–2011	Valenciennes	21	(1)
2011–2012	Vannes	16	(0)

International career
2008–2009	Guinea	8	(0)
- * Club domestic league appearances and goals as of 31 July 2012

Amara Karba Bangoura (born 10 March 1986 in Kamsar) is a Guinean footballer. He currently plays for Vannes OC in France. Bangoura also represents Guinea internationally.
