= Immanuel Heita =

Namibian footballer

Personal information
- Full name: Immanuel Shidute Heita
- Date of birth: 20 April 1992 (age 34)
- Place of birth: Windhoek, Namibia
- Height: 1.70 m (5 ft 7 in)
- Position: Midfielder

Team information
- Current team: Black Africa

Senior career*
Years	Team	Apps	(Gls)
2012–2014	Ramblers		
2014–	Black Africa		

International career^{‡}
2015–	Namibia	12	(0)
- * Club domestic league appearances and goals as of 21:31, 9 October 2020 (UTC) ‡ National team caps and goals as of 21:31, 9 October 2020 (UTC)

Immanuel Shidute Heita (born 20 April 1992) is a Namibian footballer who plays as a midfielder for Black Africa and the Namibia national football team.
