= Hamza Semmoumy =

Moroccan footballer

Personal information
- Date of birth: 13 November 1992 (age 33)
- Place of birth: Safi, Morocco
- Height: 1.74 m (5 ft 8 1/2 in)
- Position: Defender

Team information
- Current team: Al-Suqoor Club

Youth career
- Olympique Safi

Senior career*
Years	Team	Apps	(Gls)
2013–2017	Olympique Safi	116	(0)
2017–2020	FUS	47	(0)
2020–2022	MC Oujda	45	(1)
2022–2024	RS Berkane	27	(0)
2024–	Al-Suqoor Club		

International career^{‡}
2017–2018	Morocco	3	(0)
- * Club domestic league appearances and goals as of 00:00, 13 July 2012 (UTC) ‡ National team caps and goals as of 21 January 2018

Hamza Semmoumy (born 13 November 1992) is a Moroccan footballer who plays for Al-Suqoor Club. He usually plays as defender.
