= Victor Correia =

Guinean footballer

Personal information
- Date of birth: 12 January 1985 (age 41)
- Place of birth: Bissau, Guinea-Bissau
- Height: 1.81 m (5 ft 11 in)
- Position: Second striker

Senior career*
Years	Team	Apps	(Gls)
2004	Fello Star		
2005	Satellite FC		
2006	Lokeren	7	(0)
2006–2007	Lausanne-Sport	13	(1)
2007–2008	AS Cherbourg Football	11	(1)
2008–2010	Strasbourg B	7	(0)
2008–2010	Strasbourg	2	(0)
2011–2012	UJA Alfortville	9	(0)
2012–2013	UJA Maccabi Paris	5	(2)
2013–2014	Al-Shamal SC	14	(5)
2014	East Riffa Club	6	(3)
2016–2017	Dibba Al-Hisn	7	(1)

International career
2005–2008	Guinea	4	(1)
- * Club domestic league appearances and goals

Victor Correia (born 12 January 1985) is a Guinean former professional footballer who played as a secondary striker. He made four appearances scoring once for the Guinea national team between 2005 and 2008.

== Career ==
Correia was born in Bissau, Guinea-Bissau.

Correia was signed by Lausanne-Sport in summer 2006, but released in mid-season.

He was selected for the Guinea national team at the 2008 African Cup of Nations.

== Career statistics ==
=== International goals ===
Scores and results list Guinea's goal tally first, score column indicates score after each Correia goal.

List of international goals scored by Victor Correia
No.	Date	Venue	Opponent	Score	Result	Competition
1	20 November 2007	Stade Paul Fischer, Melun, France	Angola		3–0	Friendly
2	11 January 2008	Estadio Francisco Pérez, Estepona, Spain	Sudan		6–0	Friendly
