= Muna Katupose =

Namibian footballer (born 1988)

Muna Katupose (born 22 February 1988 in Opuwo) is a Namibian football forward with Black Africa S.C. and the Namibia national football team. He has 10 caps for Namibia and was on the squad which appeared at the 2008 Africa Cup of Nations, where he appeared in 2 of the 3 matches. He scored the go-ahead goal with Namibia in the clinching qualifying match for the 2008 Africa Cup of Nations against Ethiopia. He is the older brother of fellow footballer Tara Katupose.
