= 2006 Africa Cup of Nations =

25th edition of the Africa Cup of Nations

كأس الأمم الإفريقية 2006
- Africa Cup of Nations 2006 official logo

Tournament details
- Host country: Egypt
- Dates: 20 January – 10 February
- Teams: 16
- Venue: 6 (in 4 host cities)

Final positions
- Champions: Egypt (5th title)
- Runners-up: Ivory Coast
- Third place: Nigeria
- Fourth place: Senegal

Tournament statistics
- Matches played: 32
- Goals scored: 73 (2.28 per match)
- Attendance: 714,054 (22,314 per match)
- Top scorer: (Cameroon) Samuel Eto'o (5 goals)
- Best player: (Egypt) Ahmed Hassan

The 2006 Africa Cup of Nations was the 25th edition of the Africa Cup of Nations, the association football championship of Africa. It was hosted by Egypt, from 20 January to 10 February. Just like in 2004, the field of sixteen teams was split into four groups of four. Egypt won its fifth championship, beating Ivory Coast in the final 4–2 in a penalty shootout after the regulation time had ended in a goalless draw.

== Host selection ==
Bids:

- Algeria
- Egypt (selected as hosts)
- Ivory Coast
- Libya

The organization of the 2006 Africa Cup of Nations was awarded to Egypt on 24 October 2002 by the CAF Executive Committee meeting in Cairo, Egypt. Voters had a choice among four countries : Algeria, Egypt, Ivory Coast and Libya.

This marks the fourth time that Egypt has hosted the African Cup after 1959, 1974 and 1986.

It also coincides with the celebration of the 50th anniversary of the foundation of CAF.

Results
Nation	Votes
Egypt	7
Libya	2
Algeria	1
Ivory Coast	1
Total votes	11

== Qualification ==
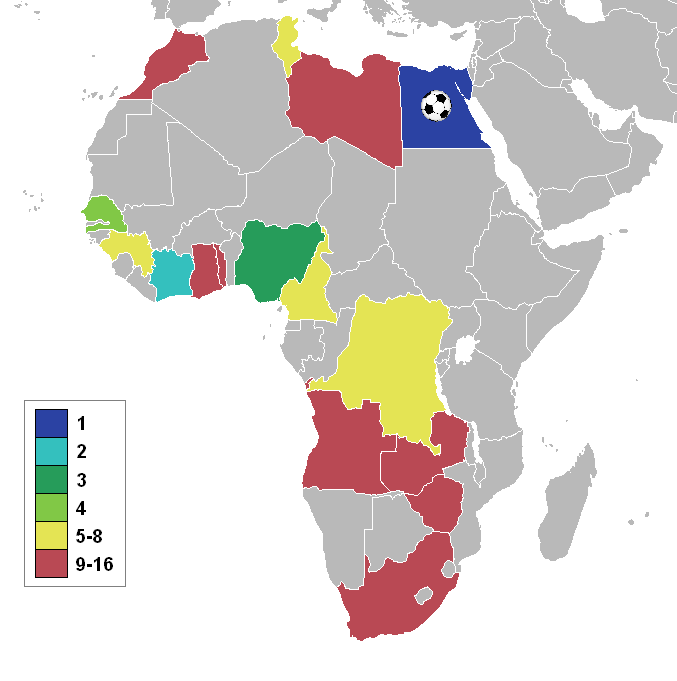
A map of Africa showing the qualified nations, highlighted by stage reached.

For the 2006 Africa Cup of Nations, qualification was done through the CAF's qualification process for the 2006 FIFA World Cup. Whereas only the winner of each group qualified for the World Cup, the top 3 finishers in each of the five qualification groups gained entry into the Africa Cup of Nations. The exception was qualification group 3, which contained hosts Egypt. Since Egypt qualified for the Africa Cup of Nations automatically as the hosts, the final berth was instead awarded to the fourth-place finishers, Libya.

2006 also marked the first time that the defending champion did not automatically qualify for the finals, although title holders Tunisia did manage to qualify.

=== Participating teams ===
- Angola
- Cameroon
- DR Congo
- Ivory Coast
- Egypt (qualified as hosts)
- Ghana
- Guinea
- Libya
- Morocco
- Nigeria
- Senegal
- South Africa
- Togo
- Tunisia (holders)
- Zambia
- Zimbabwe

== Venues ==
2006 Africa Cup of Nations is located in Egypt	Cairo		Port Said
2006 Africa Cup of Nations is located in Egypt	Cairo International Stadium	Cairo Military Academy Stadium	Port Said Stadium
2006 Africa Cup of Nations is located in Egypt	Capacity: 74,100	Capacity: 25,500	Capacity: 24,060
2006 Africa Cup of Nations is located in Egypt	Alexandria		Ismailia
2006 Africa Cup of Nations is located in Egypt	Haras El Hodoud Stadium	Alexandria Stadium	Ismailia Stadium
2006 Africa Cup of Nations is located in Egypt	Capacity: 21,650	Capacity: 19,676	Capacity: 16,606

== Draw ==
Croconile, the championship's official mascot

The draw for the final tournament took place on 20 October 2005 in Cairo. The 16 teams were split into four pots, with Pot 1 containing the top four seeded nations. Egypt, as hosts, were automatically seeded as the top team in Group A. Tunisia, the defending champions, were seeded as the top team in Group C. The remaining 14 teams were ranked based on their records in the three last editions of the competition.

Pot 1	Pot 2	Pot 3	Pot 4
Egypt (hosts); Tunisia (title holders); Cameroon; Nigeria	Morocco; South Africa; Senegal; DR Congo	Ghana; Ivory Coast; Guinea; Togo	Zambia; Angola; Zimbabwe; Libya

== Group stage ==
The top two teams of each group (highlighted in green) progress to the quarter-finals.

All times local: EET (UTC+2)

=== Group A ===
Pos	Team	Pld	W	D	L	GF	GA	GD	Pts	Qualification
1	Egypt (H)	3	2	1	0	6	1	+5	7	Advance to knockout stage
2	Ivory Coast	3	2	0	1	4	4	0	6	Advance to knockout stage
3	Morocco	3	0	2	1	0	1	−1	2	
4	Libya	3	0	1	2	1	5	−4	1	

Source: CAF
(H) Hosts
20 January 2006
19:00

Egypt	3–0	Libya
Mido 18'; Aboutrika 22'; A. Hassan 78'

Cairo International Stadium, Cairo
Attendance: 65,000
Referee: Lassina Paré (Burkina Faso)
21 January 2006
14:00

Morocco	0–1	Ivory Coast
		Drogba 39' (pen.)

Cairo International Stadium, Cairo
Attendance: 8,000
Referee: Jérôme Damon (South Africa)

24 January 2006
17:15

Libya	1–2	Ivory Coast
Kames 42'		Drogba 10'; Y. Touré 74'

Cairo International Stadium, Cairo
Attendance: 42,000
Referee: Shamsul Maidin (Singapore)
24 January 2006
20:00

Egypt	0–0	Morocco

Cairo International Stadium, Cairo
Attendance: 67,000
Referee: Coffi Codjia (Benin)

28 January 2006
19:00

Egypt	3–1	Ivory Coast
Moteab 8', 69'; Aboutrika 61'		A. Koné 43'

Cairo International Stadium, Cairo
Attendance: 74,000
Referee: Eddy Maillet (Seychelles)
28 January 2006
19:00

Libya	0–0	Morocco

Cairo Military Academy Stadium, Cairo
Attendance: 5,000
Referee: Mourad Daami (Tunisia)

=== Group B ===
Pos	Team	Pld	W	D	L	GF	GA	GD	Pts	Qualification
1	Cameroon	3	3	0	0	7	1	+6	9	Advance to knockout stage
2	DR Congo	3	1	1	1	2	2	0	4	Advance to knockout stage
3	Angola	3	1	1	1	4	5	−1	4	
4	Togo	3	0	0	3	2	7	−5	0	

Source: CAF
21 January 2006
17:15

Cameroon	3–1	Angola
Eto'o 20', 39', 78'		Flávio 31' (pen.)

Cairo Military Academy Stadium, Cairo
Attendance: 8,000
Referee: Mohamed Guezzaz (Morocco)
21 January 2006
20:00

Togo	0–2	DR Congo
		Mputu 45'; LuaLua 64'

Cairo Military Academy Stadium, Cairo
Attendance: 6,000
Referee: Mourad Daami (Tunisia)

25 January 2006
17:15

Angola	0–0	DR Congo

Cairo Military Academy Stadium, Cairo
Attendance: 2,000
Referee: Badara Diatta (Senegal)
25 January 2006
20:00

Cameroon	2–0	Togo
Eto'o 68'; Meyong 85'

Cairo Military Academy Stadium, Cairo
Attendance: 3,000
Referee: Modou Sowe (Gambia)

29 January 2006
19:00

Angola	3–2	Togo
Flávio 9', 38'; Maurito 86'		Kader 24'; Mamam 67'

Cairo International Stadium, Cairo
Attendance: 4,000
Referee: Abderrahim Al-Arjoune (Morocco)
29 January 2006
19:00

Cameroon	2–0	DR Congo
Geremi 31'; Eto'o 33'

Cairo Military Academy Stadium, Cairo
Attendance: 5,000
Referee: Koman Coulibaly (Mali)

=== Group C ===
Pos	Team	Pld	W	D	L	GF	GA	GD	Pts	Qualification
1	Guinea	3	3	0	0	7	1	+6	9	Advance to knockout stage
2	Tunisia	3	2	0	1	6	4	+2	6	Advance to knockout stage
3	Zambia	3	1	0	2	3	6	−3	3	
4	South Africa	3	0	0	3	0	5	−5	0	

Source: CAF
22 January 2006
17:15

Tunisia	4–1	Zambia
Santos 35', 82', 90+3'; Bouazizi 53'		Chamanga 9'

Haras El Hodoud Stadium, Alexandria
Attendance: 16,000
Referee: Eddy Maillet (Seychelles)
22 January 2006
20:00

South Africa	0–2	Guinea
		S. Bangoura 78'; O. Bangoura 88'

Haras El Hodoud Stadium, Alexandria
Attendance: 10,000
Referee: Mohamed Benouza (Algeria)

26 January 2006
17:15

Zambia	1–2	Guinea
Tana 33'		Feindouno 73' (pen.), 90+1'

Haras El Hodoud Stadium, Alexandria
Attendance: 24,000
Referee: Emmanuel Imiere (Nigeria)
26 January 2006
20:00

Tunisia	2–0	South Africa
Santos 32'; Benachour 58'

Haras El Hodoud Stadium, Alexandria
Attendance: 10,000
Referee: Evehe Divine (Cameroon)

30 January 2006
19:00

Tunisia	0–3	Guinea
		O. Bangoura 16'; Feindouno 70'; Diawara 90+1'

Haras El Hodoud Stadium, Alexandria
Attendance: 18,000
Referee: Shamsul Maidin (Singapore)
30 January 2006
19:00

Zambia	1–0	South Africa
C. Katongo 75'

Alexandria Stadium, Alexandria
Attendance: 4,000
Referee: Essam Abd El Fatah (Egypt)

=== Group D ===
Pos	Team	Pld	W	D	L	GF	GA	GD	Pts	Qualification
1	Nigeria	3	3	0	0	5	1	+4	9	Advance to knockout stage
2	Senegal	3	1	0	2	3	3	0	3	Advance to knockout stage
3	Ghana	3	1	0	2	2	3	−1	3	
4	Zimbabwe	3	1	0	2	2	5	−3	3	

Source: CAF
23 January 2006
17:15

Nigeria	1–0	Ghana
Taiwo 85'

Port Said Stadium, Port Said
Attendance: 18,000
Referee: Essam Abd El Fatah (Egypt)
23 January 2006
20:00

Zimbabwe	0–2	Senegal
		H. Camara 59'; Ba 80'

Port Said Stadium, Port Said
Attendance: 15,000
Referee: Khalid Abdel Rahman (Sudan)

27 January 2006
17:15

Ghana	1–0	Senegal
Amoah 13'

Port Said Stadium, Port Said
Attendance: 18,000
Referee: Abderrahim Al-Arjoune (Morocco)
27 January 2006
20:00

Nigeria	2–0	Zimbabwe
Obodo 57'; Mikel 60'

Port Said Stadium, Port Said
Attendance: 10,000
Referee: Koman Coulibaly (Mali)

31 January 2006
19:00

Nigeria	2–1	Senegal
Martins 79', 88'		S. Camara 58'

Port Said Stadium, Port Said
Attendance: 17,000
Referee: Jérôme Damon (South Africa)
31 January 2006
19:00

Ghana	1–2	Zimbabwe
Adamu 90+2'		Issah 60' (o.g.); Benjani 68'

Ismailia Stadium, Ismailia
Attendance: 18,500
Referee: René Louzaya (Congo)

== Knockout stage ==
Quarter-finals
3 February – Cairo
Egypt	4
DR Congo	1
3 February – Alexandria
Guinea	2
Senegal	3
4 February – Cairo
Cameroon	1 (11)
Ivory Coast (p)	1 (12)
4 February – Port Said
Nigeria (p)	1 (6)
Tunisia	1 (5)

Semi-finals
7 February – Cairo
Egypt	2
Senegal	1
7 February – Alexandria
Ivory Coast	1
Nigeria	0

Final
10 February – Cairo
Egypt (p)	0 (4)
Ivory Coast	0 (2)
Third place
9 February – Cairo
Senegal	0
Nigeria	1

=== Quarter-finals ===
3 February 2006
15:00

Guinea	2–3	Senegal
Diawara 24'; Feindouno 90+5'		Bouba Diop 61'; Niang 83'; H. Camara 90+3'

Haras El Hodoud Stadium, Alexandria
Attendance: 17,000
Referee: Coffi Codjia (Benin)

3 February 2006
19:00

Egypt	4–1	DR Congo
A. Hassan 33' (pen.), 89'; H. Hassan 39'; Moteab 58'		El-Saqqa 45+2' (o.g.)

Cairo International Stadium, Cairo
Attendance: 74,000
Referee: Modou Sowe (Gambia)

4 February 2006
15:00

Nigeria	1–1 (a.e.t.)	Tunisia
Obinna 6'		Haggui 49'
Penalties
Yobo (penalty missed); Taiwo (penalty scored); Ayila (penalty missed); Obinna (penalty scored); Martins (penalty scored); Mikel (penalty scored); Enyeama (penalty scored); Kanu (penalty scored)	6–5	(penalty scored) Namouchi; (penalty scored) Guemamdia; (penalty missed) Chedli; (penalty missed) Benachour; (penalty scored) Clayton; (penalty scored) Boumnijel; (penalty scored) Massaoud; (penalty missed) Bouazizi

Port Said Stadium, Port Said
Attendance: 10,000
Referee: Eddy Maillet (Seychelles)

4 February 2006
19:00

Cameroon	1–1 (a.e.t.)	Ivory Coast
Meyong 95'		B. Koné 92'
Penalties
Eto'o (penalty scored); Geremi (penalty scored); Atouba (penalty scored); Kome (penalty scored); Meyong (penalty scored); Makoun (penalty scored); Song (penalty scored); Saidou (penalty scored); Douala (penalty scored); Bikey (penalty scored); Hamidou (penalty scored); Eto'o (penalty missed)	11–12	(penalty scored) Drogba; (penalty scored) K. Touré; (penalty scored) B. Koné; (penalty scored) Faé; (penalty scored) A. Koné; (penalty scored) Kouassi; (penalty scored) Romaric; (penalty scored) Boka; (penalty scored) Zokora; (penalty scored) Zoro; (penalty scored) Tizié; (penalty scored) Drogba

Cairo Military Academy Stadium, Cairo
Attendance: 4,000
Referee: Mohamed Guezzaz (Morocco)

=== Semi-finals ===
7 February 2006
19:00

Egypt	2–1	Senegal
A. Hassan 37' (pen.); Zaki 81'		Niang 52'

Cairo International Stadium, Cairo
Attendance: 74,100
Referee: Evehe Divine (Cameroon)

7 February 2006
15:00

Nigeria	0–1	Ivory Coast
		Drogba 47'

Haras El Hodoud Stadium, Alexandria
Attendance: 20,000
Referee: Jérôme Damon (South Africa)

=== Third place match ===
9 February 2006
18:00

Senegal	0–1	Nigeria
		Lawal 79'

Cairo Military Academy Stadium, Cairo
Attendance: 11,354
Referee: Koman Coulibaly (Mali)

=== Final ===
10 February 2006
18:00

Egypt	0–0 (a.e.t.)	Ivory Coast
Penalties
A. Hassan (penalty scored); Abdelwahab (penalty scored); A.H. Ali (penalty missed); Zaki (penalty scored); Aboutrika (penalty scored)	4–2	(penalty missed) Drogba; (penalty scored) K. Touré; (penalty missed) B. Koné; (penalty scored) Eboué

Cairo International Stadium, Cairo
Attendance: 74,100
Referee: Mourad Daami (Tunisia)

== Goalscorers ==
There were 73 goals scored in 32 matches, for an average of 2.28 goals per match.

5 goals

- (Cameroon) Samuel Eto'o

4 goals

- (Egypt) Ahmed Hassan
- (Guinea) Pascal Feindouno
- (Tunisia) Francileudo Santos

3 goals

- (Egypt) Emad Moteab
- (Angola) Flávio
- (Ivory Coast) Didier Drogba

2 goals

- (Egypt) Mohamed Aboutrika
- (Cameroon) Albert Meyong
- (Guinea) Ousmane Bangoura
- (Guinea) Kaba Diawara
- (Nigeria) Obafemi Martins
- (Senegal) Henri Camara
- (Senegal) Mamadou Niang

1 goal

- (Angola) Norberto Maurito
- (Cameroon) Geremi
- (Democratic Republic of the Congo) Lomana LuaLua
- (Democratic Republic of the Congo) Tresor Mputu
- (Egypt) Hossam Hassan
- (Egypt) Mido
- (Egypt) Amr Zaki
- (Ghana) Baba Adamu
- (Ghana) Matthew Amoah
- (Guinea) Sambégou Bangoura
- (Ivory Coast) Arouna Koné
- (Ivory Coast) Bakari Koné
- (Ivory Coast) Yaya Touré
- (Libya) Abdusalam Khames
- (Nigeria) Garba Lawal
- (Nigeria) Mikel John Obi
- (Nigeria) Victor Obinna
- (Nigeria) Christian Obodo
- (Nigeria) Taye Taiwo
- (Senegal) Issa Ba
- (Senegal) Souleymane Camara
- (Senegal) Papa Bouba Diop
- (Togo) Mohamed Kader
- (Togo) Chérif Touré Mamam
- (Tunisia) Selim Benachour
- (Tunisia) Riadh Bouazizi
- (Tunisia) Karim Haggui
- (Zambia) James Chamanga
- (Zambia) Christopher Katongo
- (Zambia) Elijah Tana
- (Zimbabwe) Benjani Mwaruwari

1 own goal

- (Egypt) Abdel-Zaher El-Saqqa (against Congo DR)
- (Ghana) Issah Ahmed (against Zimbabwe)

== CAF Team of the Tournament ==
Goalkeeper

- (Egypt) Essam El Hadary

Defenders

- (Cameroon) Rigobert Song
- (Egypt) Wael Gomaa
- (Ivory Coast) Emmanuel Eboué
- (Nigeria) Taye Taiwo

Midfielders

- (Ghana) Stephen Appiah
- (Egypt) Mohamed Aboutrika
- (Egypt) Ahmed Hassan
- (Guinea) Pascal Feindouno

Forwards

- (Ivory Coast) Didier Drogba
- (Cameroon) Samuel Eto'o

== Tournament rankings ==
Ranking criteria
For teams eliminated in the same knockout round, the following criteria are applied, in the order given, to determine the final rankings:
1. Goal difference in round eliminated;
2. Goals scored in round eliminated;
3. If teams eliminated in the semi-finals or quarter-finals are tied, the above criteria are reapplied for the previous knockout round, with this process repeated once more should two semi-finalists remain tied;
4. Points in group stage;
5. Goal difference in group stage;
6. Goals scored in group stage;
7. Disciplinary points.

For teams eliminated in the group stage, the following criteria are applied, in the order given, to determine the final rankings:

1. Position in group;
2. Points;
3. Goal difference;
4. Goals scored;
5. Disciplinary points.

Pos.	Team	G	Pld	W	D	L	Pts	GF	GA	GD
1	Egypt	A	6	4	2	0	14	12	3	+9
2	Ivory Coast	A	6	3	2	1	11	6	5	+1
3	Nigeria	D	6	4	1	1	13	7	3	+4
4	Senegal	D	6	2	0	4	6	7	8	−1
Eliminated in the quarter-finals
5	Cameroon	B	4	3	1	0	10	8	2	+6
6	Guinea	C	4	3	0	1	9	9	4	+5
7	Tunisia	C	4	2	1	1	7	7	5	+2
8	DR Congo	B	4	1	1	2	4	3	6	−3
Eliminated in the group stage
9	Angola	B	3	1	1	1	4	4	5	−1
10	Zambia	C	3	1	0	2	3	3	6	−3
11	Ghana	D	3	1	0	2	3	2	3	−1
12	Zimbabwe	D	3	1	0	2	3	2	5	−3
13	Morocco	A	3	0	2	1	2	0	1	−1
14	Libya	A	3	0	1	2	1	1	5	−4
15	Togo	B	3	0	0	3	0	2	7	−5
16	South Africa	C	3	0	0	3	0	0	5	−5

== See also ==
- Football in Egypt
