= Daouda Diémé =

Senegalese footballer (born 1989)

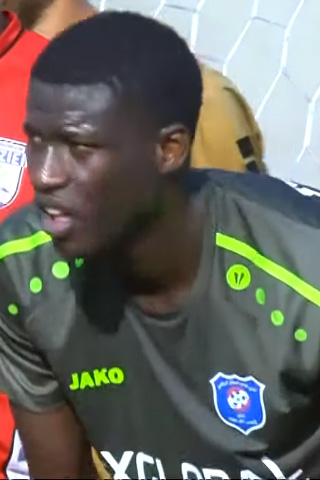
- Diémé with Shabab Sahel in 2019

Personal information
- Full name: Daouda Guèye Diémé
- Date of birth: 23 September 1989 (age 37)
- Place of birth: Ziguinchor, Senegal
- Height: 1.78 m (5 ft 10 in)
- Position: Striker

Team information
- Current team: Naft Maysan SC
- Number: 10

Senior career*
Years	Team	Apps	(Gls)
2010–2012	Zig Inter		
2013–2014	Port Autonome		
2014–2018	Jaraaf		
2018–2019	Bekaa	22	(4)
2019–2020	Shabab Sahel	3	(1)
2020	Ahed	0	(0)
2021–2022	Al-Qasim		(12)
2022–24	Al-Kahrabaa	8	(1)
2024-	Naft Maysan SC	10	(1)

International career
2017	Senegal	4	(1)
- * Club domestic league appearances and goals as of 28/12/24 @ 13:25(AEST)

Daouda Guèye Diémé (born 23 October 1989) is a Senegalese professional footballer who plays as a striker for Iraqi club Al-Kahrabaa. He has also played for the Senegal national team.

== Club career ==
Diémé began his career at the Ziguinchor-based club Zig Inter; he then played for Port Autonome and Jaraaf, whom he captained in the Senegal Premier League. He was one of five nominees for best local player in 2018.

Following a season at Bekaa in the Lebanese Premier League, Diémé joined Shabab Sahel on 22 May 2019. He moved to Ahed on 27 January 2020, to compete in the 2020 AFC Cup. On 19 January 2021, Diémé transferred to Al-Qasim in the Iraqi Premier League.

== International career ==
Diémé represented Senegal internationally at the 2018 African Nations Championship qualification, scoring a goal in a 3–1 win over Sierra Leone on 22 July 2017.

== Career statistics ==
=== International ===
As of match played 23 August 2017

Appearances and goals by national team and year
National team	Year	Apps	Goals
Senegal	2017	4	1
Total		4	1

Scores and results list Senegal's goal tally first, score column indicates score after each Diémé goal.

List of international goals scored by Daouda Diémé
No.	Date	Venue	Opponent	Score	Result	Competition	Ref.
1	22 July 2017	Stade Demba Diop, Dakar, Senegal	Sierra Leone	3–1	3–1	2018 African Nations Championship qualification	

== Honours ==
Shabab Sahel

- Lebanese Elite Cup: 2019
