= Abdesalam Kames =

Libyan footballer

Abdesalam Kames is a Libyan football attacker. As of the 2006/2007 season he played for Al Olympic Zaouia.

== Career ==
Kames was a member of the Libyan 2006 African Nations Cup team, which finished bottom of its group in the first round of competition, thus failing to secure qualification for the quarter-finals. He was the squad's only goalscorer in the competition.

== Clubs ==
- (Libya) Al Olympic Zaouia
