= Martin Phiri =

Zambian footballer (born 1991)

Personal information
- Date of birth: 2 May 1991 (age 35)
- Place of birth: Lusaka, Zambia
- Position: Striker

Team information
- Current team: Green Buffaloes

Senior career*
Years	Team	Apps	(Gls)
2012–2013	Green Eagles		
2013–2018	Power Dynamos		
2014	→ NAPSA Stars (loan)		
2018–2019	Zanaco		
2020–	Green Buffaloes		

International career^{‡}
2017–	Zambia	6	(1)
- * Club domestic league appearances and goals ‡ National team caps and goals as of 18 February 2019

Martin Phiri (born 2 May 1991) is a Zambian footballer who plays as a forward for Green Buffaloes and the Zambia national football team.
