= Praise Tonha =

Zimbabwean footballer (born 1995)

Personal information
- Date of birth: 29 March 1995 (age 31)
- Place of birth: Zimbabwe
- Position: Midfielder

Team information
- Current team: Kansanshi Dynamos

Senior career*
Years	Team	Apps	(Gls)
2013–2014	Monomotapa United		
2014–2016	Triangle United		
2016–2018	How Mine		
2018	CAPS United		
2018–2020	Triangle United		
2020–2021	Buildcon		
2021–	Kansanshi Dynamos		

International career^{‡}
2014–2018	Zimbabwe	4	(0)
- * Club domestic league appearances and goals as of 21 August 2022 ‡ National team caps and goals as of 20 March 2019

Praise Tonha (born 29 March 1995) is a Zimbabwean footballer who plays as a defender for Kansanshi Dynamos F.C.

== Career ==
=== Kansanshi Dynamos ===
Following a season at Buildcon, Tonha joined Zambian club Kansanshi Dynamos in August 2021. He signed a two-year contract with the club.

=== International ===
Tonha was capped at the U23 level with Zimbabwe, before graduating to the senior international roster in 2014. He made his debut in September, making a substitute appearance in a friendly match against Botswana. In November 2017, he was included in Zimbabwe's provisional squad for the 2017 CECAFA Cup prior to the teams' withdrawal.

== Career statistics ==
=== International ===
As of matches played 18 April 2018

National team	Year	Apps	Goals
Zimbabwe	2014	1	0
Zimbabwe	2017	1	0
Zimbabwe	2018	2	0
Total		4	0
