= Mohamed Sorel Camara =

Guinean footballer (born 1997)

Personal information
- Date of birth: 27 May 1997 (age 29)
- Place of birth: Kindia, Guinea
- Position: Midfielder

Senior career*
| Years | Team | Apps | (Gls) |
| 2014–2017 | Fello Star | | |
| 2017–2018 | Hafia | | |
| 2018–2019 | Kaloum Star | | |
| 2019–2020 | Tours | 3 | (0) |
| 2020–2022 | FCO Tourangeau | 7 | (0) |
| 2022 | Tours FC | | |

International career^{‡}
| 2017 | Guinea | 3 | (2) |
- * Club domestic league appearances and goals as of 20:34, 16 April 2026 (UTC) ‡ National team caps and goals as of 23 December 2021

Mohamed Sorel Camara (born 27 May 1997) is a Guinean footballer who currently plays as a midfielder for French side Chambray.

== Career statistics ==
=== Club ===
As of 23 December 2021.

Appearances and goals by club, season and competition
| Club | Season | League | | | Cup | | Other | | Total | |
| Club | Season | Division | Apps | Goals | Apps | Goals | Apps | Goals | Apps | Goals |
|---|---|---|---|---|---|---|---|---|---|---|
| Tours | 2019–20 | Championnat National 3 | 3 | 0 | 1 (Note: Appearances in the Coupe de France) | 0 | 0 | 0 | 4 | 0 |
| FCO Tourangeau | 2020–21 | Championnat National 3 | 5 | 0 | 0 | 0 | 0 | 0 | 5 | 0 |
| FCO Tourangeau | 2021–22 | Championnat National 3 | 2 | 0 | 0 | 0 | 0 | 0 | 2 | 0 |
| FCO Tourangeau | Total | | 7 | 0 | 0 | 0 | 0 | 0 | 7 | 0 |
| Career total | | | 10 | 0 | 1 | 0 | 0 | 0 | 11 | 0 |

=== International ===
As of matches played 23 December 2021.

Appearances and goals by national team and year
| National team | Year | Apps | Goals |
|---|---|---|---|
| Guinea | 2017 | 3 | 2 |
| Total | | 3 | 2 |

=== International goals ===
Scores and results list Guinea's goal tally first, score column indicates score after each Guinea goal.

List of international goals scored by Camara
| No. | Date | Venue | Opponent | Score | Result | Competition |
|---|---|---|---|---|---|---|
| 1 | 15 July 2017 | Estádio 24 de Setembro, Bissau, Guinea-Bissau | Guinea-Bissau | 2–1 | 3–1 | 2018 African Nations Championship qualification |
| 2 | 15 August 2017 | Stade Al Djigo, Pikine, Senegal | Senegal | 1–1 | 1–3 | 2018 African Nations Championship qualification |
