= Kemson Fofanah =

Sierra Leonean footballer (born 1994)

Personal information
- Date of birth: 23 May 1994 (age 32)
- Place of birth: Freetown, Sierra Leone
- Height: 1.58 m (5 ft 2 in)
- Position: Right-back

Team information
- Current team: East End Lions

Senior career*
Years	Team	Apps	(Gls)
2011–2013	Diamond Stars		
2014–2018	East End Lions		
2018–2020	B 1893	17	(0)
2020–	East End Lions		

International career^{‡}
2017–	Sierra Leone	4	(1)
- * Club domestic league appearances and goals as of 13 June 2021 ‡ National team caps and goals as of 13 June 2021

Kemson Fofanah (born 23 May 1994) is a Sierra Leonean footballer who plays as a right-back for East End Lions.
