= Sékou Amadou Camara =

Guinean association football player

Personal information
- Full name: Sékou Amadou Camara
- Date of birth: 23 September 1997 (age 29)
- Place of birth: Port Kamsar, Guinea
- Height: 1.84 m (6 ft 1/2 in)
- Position: Striker

Team information
- Current team: Difaâ El Jadidi
- Number: 10

Senior career*
Years	Team	Apps	(Gls)
2013–2014	Satellite		
2014–2016	Horoya AC		
2016	Union SG	0	(0)
2016–2017	Eendracht Aalst	1	(0)
2017–2019	Horoya AC		
2019–2020	Difaâ El Jadidi	10	(2)
2020	FC Wil 1900		

International career^{‡}
2015–	Guinea	10	(11)
- * Club domestic league appearances and goals ‡ National team caps and goals as of 17 January 2018

Sékou Amadou Camara (born 23 September 1997) is a Guinean footballer who plays as a striker for Difaâ El Jadidi in the Botola.

== International career ==
=== International goals ===
Scores and results list Guinea's goal tally first.

No.	Date	Venue	Opponent	Score	Result	Competition
1.	22 June 2015	Stade Modibo Kéïta, Bamako, Mali	Liberia	1–0	3–1	2016 African Nations Championship qualification
2.	22 June 2015	Stade Modibo Kéïta, Bamako, Mali	Liberia	2–0	3–1	2016 African Nations Championship qualification
3.	15 July 2017	Estádio 24 de Setembro, Bissau, Guinea-Bissau	Guinea-Bissau	3–1	3–1	2018 African Nations Championship qualification
4.	22 July 2017	Stade du 28 Septembre, Conakry, Guinea	Guinea-Bissau	1–0	7–0	2018 African Nations Championship qualification
5.	22 July 2017	Stade du 28 Septembre, Conakry, Guinea	Guinea-Bissau	4–0	7–0	2018 African Nations Championship qualification
6.	22 July 2017	Stade du 28 Septembre, Conakry, Guinea	Guinea-Bissau	5–0	7–0	2018 African Nations Championship qualification
7.	22 July 2017	Stade du 28 Septembre, Conakry, Guinea	Guinea-Bissau	6–0	7–0	2018 African Nations Championship qualification
8.	23 August 2017	Stade du 28 Septembre, Conakry, Guinea	Senegal	1–0	5–0	2018 African Nations Championship qualification
9.	23 August 2017	Stade du 28 Septembre, Conakry, Guinea	Senegal	4–0	5–0	2018 African Nations Championship qualification
10.	23 August 2017	Stade du 28 Septembre, Conakry, Guinea	Senegal	5–0	5–0	2018 African Nations Championship qualification
11.	14 January 2018	Stade Mohamed V, Casablanca, Morocco	Sudan	1–1	1–2	2018 African Nations Championship
