= Gaston Houngbédji =

Beninese footballer

Personal information
- Full name: Komassouni Gaston Houngbedji
- Date of birth: 5 February 1998 (age 28)
- Place of birth: N'Dali, Benin
- Height: 1.81 m (5 ft 11 in)
- Position: Defender

Senior career*
Years	Team	Apps	(Gls)
2015–2020	ASPAC FC		
2020-2021	AS Dragons		
2021-2024	Loto FC		
2024-2025	Al-Merrikh SC		

International career^{‡}
2017–	Benin	12	(0)
- * Club domestic league appearances and goals as of 13 January 2025 ‡ National team caps and goals as of 1 September 2019

Gaston Houngbédji (born 5 February 1998) is a Beninese football defender for ASPAC FC .
