= Ibrahima Sory Sankhon =

Guinean footballer

Personal information
- Date of birth: 1 January 1996 (age 30)
- Place of birth: Forécariah, Guinea
- Height: 1.77 m (5 ft 10 in)
- Position: Midfielder

Youth career
- Santoba

Senior career*
Years	Team	Apps	(Gls)
2013–2015	Santoba		
2015–2018	Horoya AC		
2018–2021	Sint-Truidense	61	(0)
2021–2023	RWD Molenbeek	26	(0)
2023–2024	Dender EH	3	(0)

International career^{‡}
2015–	Guinea	27	(6)
- * Club domestic league appearances and goals as of 13 April 2024 ‡ National team caps and goals as of 15 June 2023

Ibrahima Sory Sankhon (born 1 January 1996) is a Guinean footballer who plays as a midfielder.

== Club career ==
On 4 July 2023, Sankhon signed a one-season contract with an optional second year with Dender EH in Belgium.

== International career ==
=== International goals ===
Scores and results list Guinea's goal tally first.

No	Date	Venue	Opponent	Score	Result	Competition
1.	22 June 2015	Stade Modibo Kéïta, Bamako, Mali	Liberia	3–1	3–1	2016 African Nations Championship qualification
2.	26 January 2016	Umuganda Stadium, Gisenyi, Rwanda	Nigeria	1–0	1–0	2016 African Nations Championship
3.	3 February 2016	Amahoro Stadium, Kigali, Rwanda	DR Congo	1–1	1–1 (4–5 p)	2016 African Nations Championship
4.	22 July 2017	Stade du 28 Septembre, Conakry, Guinea	Guinea-Bissau	3–0	7–0	2018 African Nations Championship qualification
5.	23 August 2017	Stade du 28 Septembre, Conakry, Guinea	Senegal	3–0	5–0	2018 African Nations Championship qualification
6.	20 January 2018	Stade de Marrakech, Marrakesh, Morocco	Mauritania	1–0	1–0	2018 African Nations Championship
