= Ousmane Bangoura =

Guinean footballer (born 1979)

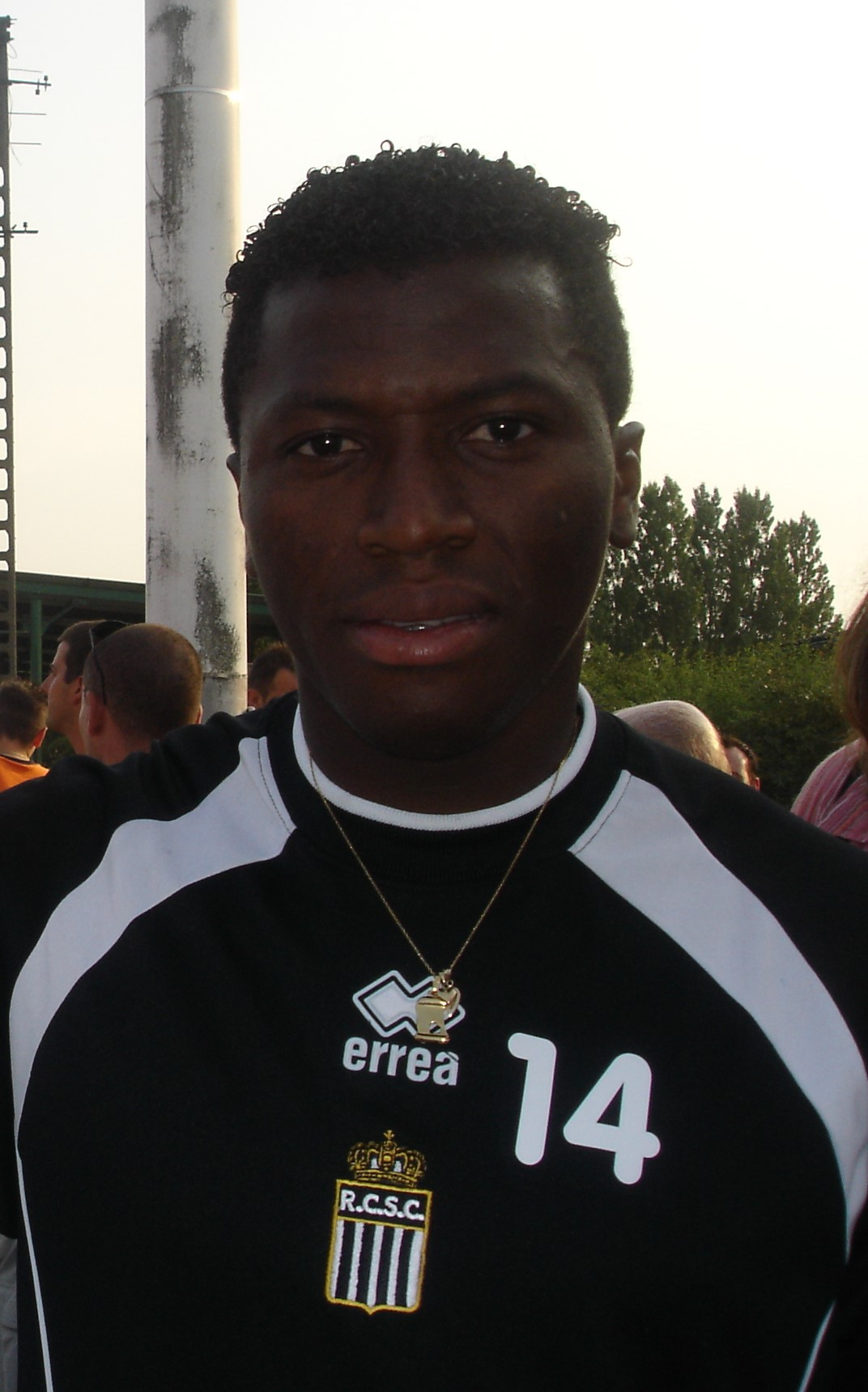

Personal information
- Date of birth: 1 December 1979 (age 46)
- Place of birth: Conakry, Guinea
- Height: 1.70 m (5 ft 7 in)
- Position: Striker

Youth career
- 1996–1997: Étoile de Guinée

Senior career*
Years	Team	Apps	(Gls)
1997–2004	Niort	181	(20)
2004–2006	Charleroi	27	(2)
2006	Ginde	7	(0)

International career^{‡}
1995	Guinea U-17	3	(1)
2004–2006	Guinea	7	(5)
- * Club domestic league appearances and goals as of 24 June 2009 ‡ National team caps and goals as of 3 February 2006

Ousmane Bangoura (born 1 December 1979) is a retired Guinean football striker. He last played for Shenyang Ginde in 2006.

== Injury ==
While playing a league match on 7 July 2006, the 26-year-old Ginde striker suffered a ruptured eyeball after being caught in the face by Qingdao's Lyu Gang (Chinese:呂剛). It happened while he was trying to head the ball and his opponent tried to kick it away. This resulted in the opponent's studs catching Bangoura in the eye. Lu Gang was only punished with a yellow card.

On 10 August 2006 it was reported that Bangoura's eye was saved, but he was blinded in that eye. At the moment he can only sense light but it is thought that the situation may improve over the coming months. A compensation package has been agreed that will see him receive his wages in full and an insurance payout of US$12,550, he will also receive US$100,000 of donations collected from Chinese league managers and players.

Bangoura was then released by Ginde thus retired from professional football. He once sued Ginde for a concealment over his injury condition and conflict of compensation to FIFA but without response. He is now a youth coach of French club Niort.

== Personal life ==
Bangoura acquired French nationality by naturalization on 21 December 2001.
