= Mohamed N'Diaye =

Guinean footballer

Personal information
- Date of birth: 29 December 1997 (age 28)
- Position: Midfielder

Team information
- Current team: SOAR

Senior career*
Years	Team	Apps	(Gls)
2016–2017	FC Séquence de Dixinn		
2017–2018	Horoya AC		
2018–	CO Coyah/SOAR		

International career^{‡}
2017–2018	Guinea	6	(2)
- * Club domestic league appearances and goals as of 4 October 2021 ‡ National team caps and goals as of 4 October 2021

Mohamed N'Diaye (born 29 December 1997) is a Guinean football midfielder who plays for SOAR.
