= Stade Al Djigo =

Sports venue in Pikine, Senegal

- Interactive map of Stade Al Djigo
- Full name: Stade Alassane Djigo
- Location: Pikine, Senegal
- Coordinates: 14.7549°N 17.3929°W
- Capacity: 10,000

Tenants
- AS Pikine; AS Douanes

Stade Alassane Djigo is a multi-use stadium in Pikine, Senegal. It is currently used mostly for football matches and serves as a home ground of AS Pikine. The stadium holds 10,000 spectators.

Sometimes AS Douanes play its matches at the stadium.

== History ==
The only continental competition took place in the stadium for Pikine was in the 2015 season where two matches took place.
