= 2012 MTN 8 =

Tournament details
- Country: South Africa
- Teams: 8

Final positions
- Champions: Moroka Swallows (3rd title)
- Runners-up: SuperSport United

Tournament statistics
- Matches played: 9
- Goals scored: 28 (3.11 per match)
- Top goal scorer: L. Chabangu (Moroka Swallows) 3 goals

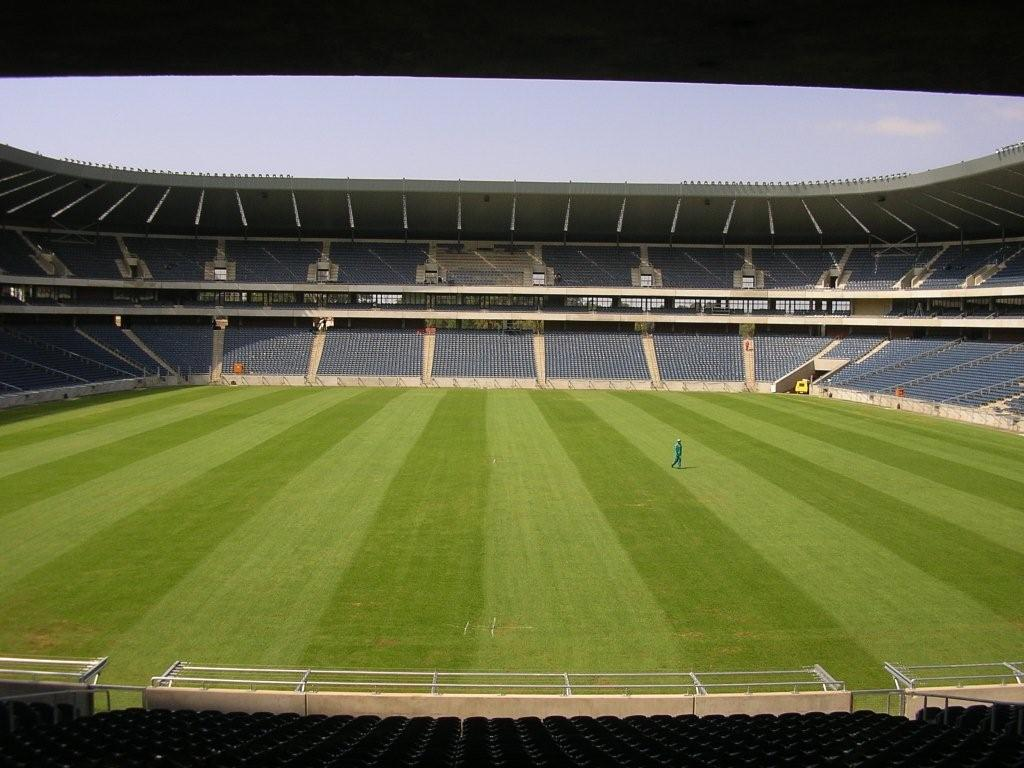
The Orlando Stadium, venue of the final

The 2012 MTN 8 was the 38th time that this annual tournament took place. It was contested by the eight top teams of the Premier Soccer League table at the end of the 2011–12 season. The tournament began on 3 August 2012, and was won by Moroka Swallows, their first Top 8 title since 1979.

== Teams ==
The eight teams that competed in the MTN 8 knockout competition are: (listed according to their finishing position in the 2011-12 Premier Soccer League season.

1. Orlando Pirates
2. Moroka Swallows
3. SuperSport United
4. Mamelodi Sundowns
5. Kaizer Chiefs
6. Free State Stars
7. AmaZulu
8. Bloemfontein Celtic

== Fixtures & Results ==
=== Rules for MTN8 ===
On 28 July 2011 The PSL Executive Committee held a meeting to discuss the issue of home and away fixtures. There has been an amendment to the MTN8 rules pertaining to the issue of home and away fixtures.

The approved rule reads as follows: In the first round of the competition (last 8 or quarter-finals) the clubs finishing in the top four positions of the Premier Division in the previous season will be the home clubs.

=== Quarter-finals ===
3 August 2012
20:00

Orlando Pirates	1–0	Bloemfontein Celtic
A. Jali 82'	Report

Orlando Stadium, Soweto
Attendance: 14,000

4 August 2012
15:00

SuperSport United	2–1	Free State Stars
N. Paulse 27'; F. Cale 55'	Report	63' M. Mashaba

Peter Mokaba Stadium, Polokwane
Attendance: 5,000

5 August 2012
15:00

Mamelodi Sundowns	4–1	Kaizer Chiefs
T. Sangweni 7'; T. Langerman 12'; T. Langerman 24'; E. Mangele 37'	Report	76' R. Letsholonyane

Loftus Versfeld Stadium, Pretoria
Attendance: 40,000

5 August 2012
15:00

Moroka Swallows	2–0	AmaZulu
L. Chabangu 33'; S. Nomvethe 63'	Report

Dobsonville Stadium, Dobsonville
Attendance: 2,000

=== Teams through to the Semi-finals ===
- 1 Orlando Pirates
- 2 SuperSport United
- 3 Mamelodi Sundowns
- 4 Moroka Swallows

=== Semi-finals ===
Team 1	Agg.	Team 2	1st leg	2nd leg
SuperSport United (South Africa)	3 - 0	(South Africa) Orlando Pirates	0 - 0	3 - 0
Mamelodi Sundowns (South Africa)	5 - 6	(South Africa) Moroka Swallows	3 - 3	2 - 3

==== 1st leg ====
18 August 2012
20:15

Mamelodi Sundowns	3–3	Moroka Swallows
T. Modise 16' (pen.); H. Kekana 63'; E. Mangele 84'	Report	6' F Obada; 8' A Hendricks; 74' B Chenene

Peter Mokaba Stadium, Polokwane
Attendance: 9,500
19 August 2012
15:00

SuperSport United	0–0	Orlando Pirates
E. Gyimah (red card) 44'	Report	(red card) 90' R. Mahamutsa

Lucas Moripe Stadium, Pretoria
Attendance: 20,000

==== 2nd leg ====
25 August 2012
20:15

Orlando Pirates	0–3	SuperSport United
B McCarthy (red card) 45'		63' A Hartog; 79' C Mulenga; 88' M Khenyeza

Orlando Stadium, Soweto
Attendance: 18,000
26 August 2012
15:00

Moroka Swallows	3–2	Mamelodi Sundowns
L. Chabangu 10'; L. Chabangu 14'; B. Chenene 19'		22' T. Modise; 90+2' N Mushekwi

Dobsonville Stadium, Dobsonville
Attendance: 10,000

== Final ==
22 September 2012
20:15

SuperSport United	1–2	Moroka Swallows
F. Cale 3'	Report	17' G. Nergadze; 85' B. Chenene

Orlando Stadium, Soweto
Attendance: 8000

Supersport United	Moroka Swallows

GK	1	(South Africa) Rowen Fernandez
RB	25	(South Africa) Roscoe Pietersen
CB	6	(Zambia) Davis Nkausu
CB	29	(Senegal) Mor Diouf
LB	4	(South Africa) Bevan Fransman
DM	15	(South Africa) Mark Haskins		(substituted off) 62'
DM	24	(South Africa) Franklin Cale		(substituted off) 89'
RW	16	(Ghana) Edwin Gyimah
AM	10	(South Africa) Sameehg Doutie
LW	11	(South Africa) Sibusiso Zuma	Booked	(substituted off) 58'
CF	21	(South Africa) Mabhuti Khenyeza	Booked
Substitutes:
GK	31	(South Africa) Boalefa Pule
DF	26	(South Africa) Thabo September
MF	22	(South Africa) Jabulani Maluleke
MF	19	(Zambia) Clifford Mulenga		(substituted on) 87'
FW	27	(South Africa) Nathan Paulse
FW	8	(South Africa) George Maluleka		(substituted on) 61'
FW	7	(South Africa) Kermit Erasmus		(substituted on) 57'
Manager:
(South Africa) Gavin Hunt

GK	34	(Nigeria) Greg Etafia
RB	2	(South Africa) Rudi Isaacs
CB	19	(South Africa) Luvhengo Mungomeni
CB	6	(South Africa) Ashraf Hendricks	Booked
LB	31	(South Africa) Shere Lekgothoane
DM	5	(Georgia (country)) Giorgi Nergadze
CM	21	(South Africa) Katlego Mashego
RW	12	(South Africa) Lefa Tsutsulupa
AM	14	(South Africa) Lerato Chabangu		(substituted off) 87'
LW	18	(South Africa) Bennett Chenene	Booked	(substituted off) 90'
CF	24	(Nigeria) Felix Obada		(substituted off) 67'
Substitutes:
GK	33	(South Africa) Aubrey Mathibe
DF	13	(Zimbabwe) Gilbert Mapemba
MF	4	(South Africa) Sibusiso Khumalo
MF	9	(South Africa) David Mathebula		(substituted on) 87'
MF	40	(South Africa) MacBeth Sibaya		(substituted on) 90'
FW	20	(South Africa) Mpho Maleka
FW	10	(South Africa) Siyabonga Nomvethe		(substituted on) 67'
Manager:
(Portugal) Zeca Marques

Match rules

- 90 minutes.
- 30 minutes of extra time if necessary.
- Penalty shoot-out if scores still level.
- Seven named substitutes.
- Maximum of three substitutions.

== Statistics ==
=== Top Goal Scorer ===
Rank	Player	Club	Goals
1	(South Africa) Lerato Chabangu	Moroka Swallows	3
2	(South Africa) Tebogo Langerman	Mamelodi Sundowns	2
2	(South Africa) Edward Manqele	Mamelodi Sundowns	2
2	(South Africa) Teko Modise	Mamelodi Sundowns	2
2	(South Africa) Bennett Chenene	Moroka Swallows	2
3	(South Africa) Andile Jali	Orlando Pirates	1
3	(South Africa) Nathan Paulse	SuperSport United	1
3	(South Africa) Franklin Cale	SuperSport United	1
3	(South Africa) Ashley Hartog	SuperSport United	1
3	(South Africa) Clifford Mulenga	SuperSport United	1
3	(South Africa) Mabhuti Khenyeza	SuperSport United	1
3	(South Africa) Mzikayise Mashaba	Free State Stars	1
3	(South Africa) Thamsanqa Sangweni	Mamelodi Sundowns	1
3	(South Africa) Nyasha Mushekwi	Mamelodi Sundowns	1
3	(South Africa) Hlompho Kekana	Mamelodi Sundowns	1
3	(South Africa) Reneilwe Letsholonyane	Kaizer Chiefs	1
3	(South Africa) Siyabonga Nomvethe	Moroka Swallows	1
3	(South Africa) Felix Obada	Moroka Swallows	1
3	(South Africa) Ashraf Hendricks	Moroka Swallows	1
