= 2011 African Nations Championship squads =

Below is a list of squads used in the 2011 African Nations Championship.

== Group A ==
=== Sudan ===
Coach: Mazda

No.	Pos.	Player	Date of birth (age)	Caps	Goals	Club
1	GK	Bahaeddine Rihan	January 1, 1978 (aged 33)	15	0	(Sudan Football Association) Jazeerat Al-Feel
2	DF	Omer Mohamed Bakhit	November 24, 1984 (aged 26)	30	1	(Sudan Football Association) Al-Hilal
3	DF	Amir Rabia	January 1, 1982 (aged 29)	3	0	(Sudan Football Association) Al-Ahli Khartoum
4	DF	Mohammed Ali El Khider	January 1, 1985 (aged 26)	37	2	(Sudan Football Association) Al-Merreikh
5	MF	Ala'a Eldin Yousif	January 3, 1982 (aged 29)	40	4	(Sudan Football Association) Al-Hilal
6	MF	Mosaab Omer	June 4, 1986 (aged 24)	20	1	(Sudan Football Association) Al-Merreikh
7	MF	Raji Abdel-Aati	January 1, 1990 (aged 21)	20	0	(Sudan Football Association) Al-Merreikh
8	MF	Haitham Mustafa	August 30, 1977 (aged 33)	60	6	(Sudan Football Association) Al-Hilal
9	MF	Saif Eldin Ali Masawi	January 1, 1981 (aged 30)	41	3	(Sudan Football Association) Al-Hilal
10	MF	Haytham Tambal	November 28, 1978 (aged 32)	45	20	(Sudan Football Association) Al-Merreikh
11	FW	Bakri Al-Madina	January 1, 1988 (aged 23)	10	2	(Sudan Football Association) Al-Hilal
12	MF	Bader Eldin Abdalla Galag	April 10, 1981 (aged 29)	45	7	(Sudan Football Association) Al-Merreikh
13	FW	Muhannad El Tahir	December 3, 1984 (aged 26)	22	4	(Sudan Football Association) Al-Hilal
14	DF	Balla Jabir	September 12, 1985 (aged 25)			(Sudan Football Association) Al-Merreikh
15	DF	Khalefa Ahmed Mohamed	January 1, 1986 (aged 25)	10	0	(Sudan Football Association) Al-Hilal
16	GK	Hafez Ahmed	January 17, 1977 (aged 34)	3	0	(Sudan Football Association) Almahdia
17	FW	Mudather Karika	December 18, 1986 (aged 24)	21	5	(Sudan Football Association) Al-Hilal
18	DF	Ahmed El-Basha	January 2, 1982 (aged 29)	23	0	(Sudan Football Association) Al-Merreikh
19	MF	Mohamed Ahmed Bashir	July 22, 1983 (aged 27)	15	1	(Sudan Football Association) Al-Hilal
20	MF	Majdi Abdelmajeed	January 1, 1983 (aged 28)	3	0	(Sudan Football Association) Alamal Atbara
21	GK	Mohammed Kamal	January 1, 1979 (aged 32)	0	0	(Sudan Football Association) Al-Merreikh
22	FW	Nasreldin Jojo	April 5, 1989 (aged 21)	1	0	(Sudan Football Association) Al-Ahli Khartoum
23	DF	Najm Eldin Abdallah Abdelgabar	April 7, 1985 (aged 25)	10	0	(Sudan Football Association) Al-Merreikh

Source: Sudan Team

=== Gabon ===
Coach: (Gabon) Pierre Aubameyang

No.	Pos.	Player	Date of birth (age)	Caps	Goals	Club
1	GK	Yves Bitséki Moto	April 23, 1983 (aged 27)			(Gabonese Football Federation) US Bitam
2	DF	Edmond Mouele	October 13, 1988 (aged 22)			(Gabonese Football Federation) AS Mangasport
3	MF	Ngame Essono	August 29, 1988 (aged 22)			(Gabonese Football Federation) Missile FC
4	DF	Henri Junior Ndong	August 23, 1992 (aged 18)			(Gabonese Football Federation) Sapins FC
5	DF	Rémy Ebanega	November 17, 1989 (aged 21)			(Gabonese Football Federation) US Bitam
6	MF	Tchen Djesnot Kabi	April 27, 1986 (aged 24)			(Gabonese Football Federation) CMS Libreville
7	MF	Claude Mvé Mintsa	January 30, 1985 (aged 26)			(Gabonese Football Federation) Missile FC
8	FW	Malick Evouna	November 28, 1992 (aged 18)			(Gabonese Football Federation) CMS Libreville
9	FW	Johann Lengoualama	September 29, 1992 (aged 18)			(Gabonese Football Federation) AS Mangasport
10	MF	Alain Djissikadié	December 26, 1982 (aged 28)			(Gabonese Football Federation) US Bitam
11	MF	Beni Kiendé	March 10, 1986 (aged 24)			(Gabonese Football Federation) Missile FC
12	DF	Jean II Nkéleko	March 13, 1988 (aged 22)			(Gabonese Football Federation) US Oyem
13	DF	Farel Mounguengui	May 5, 1988 (aged 22)			(Gabonese Football Federation) US Bitam
14	FW	Aliday Poaty	November 2, 1983 (aged 27)			(Gabonese Football Federation) Missile FC
15	DF	Roger Isakunia	December 30, 1984 (aged 26)			(Gabonese Football Federation) AS Mangasport
16	GK	Willy Mikiela	March 6, 1990 (aged 20)			(Gabonese Football Federation) AS Pelican
17	MF	André Biyogo Poko	January 1, 1993 (aged 18)			(Gabonese Football Federation) US Bitam
18	FW	Ulrich Bembangoye	October 27, 1988 (aged 22)			(Gabonese Football Federation) US Bitam
19	FW	Pitty Djoué	July 16, 1981 (aged 29)			(Gabonese Football Federation) CF Mounana
20	DF	Charly Moussono	November 15, 1984 (aged 26)			(Gabonese Football Federation) Missile FC
21	MF	Cédric Boussoughou	July 20, 1991 (aged 19)			(Gabonese Football Federation) AS Mangasport
22	GK	Nick Moundounga	February 25, 1992 (aged 18)			(Gabonese Football Federation) Sogéa FC
23	MF	Romuald Ntsitsigui	April 8, 1991 (aged 19)			(Gabonese Football Federation) AS Mangasport

Source: Gabon Team

=== Uganda ===
Coach: (Scotland) Bobby Williamson

No.	Pos.	Player	Date of birth (age)	Caps	Goals	Club
1	GK	Yasin Mugabi	January 31, 1988 (aged 23)			(Federation of Uganda Football Associations) Proline FC
2	DF	Jimmy Mukubya	December 17, 1984 (aged 26)			(Federation of Uganda Football Associations) Uganda Revenue Authority SC
3	DF	Habib Kavuma	September 4, 1991 (aged 19)			(Federation of Uganda Football Associations) Bunamwaya SC
4	DF	Edward Ssali	June 14, 1985 (aged 25)			(Federation of Uganda Football Associations) Bunamwaya SC
5	DF	Derrick Walulya	February 3, 1987 (aged 24)			(Federation of Uganda Football Associations) Uganda Revenue Authority SC
6	MF	Simon Sserunkuma	September 19, 1991 (aged 19)			(Federation of Uganda Football Associations) SC Villa
7	MF	Mike Mutyaba	December 22, 1994 (aged 16)			(Federation of Uganda Football Associations) Bunamwaya SC
8	FW	Tony Odur	December 7, 1984 (aged 26)			(Federation of Uganda Football Associations) Bunamwaya SC
9	FW	Caesar Okhuti	October 7, 1990 (aged 20)			(Federation of Uganda Football Associations) Bunamwaya SC
10	MF	Stephen Bengo	December 24, 1988 (aged 22)			(Federation of Uganda Football Associations) Uganda Revenue Authority SC
11	MF	Noah Ssemakula	November 20, 1984 (aged 26)			(Federation of Uganda Football Associations) Express FC
12	DF	Ayubu Kisalita	December 25, 1992 (aged 18)			(Federation of Uganda Football Associations) Bunamwaya SC
13	DF	Ivan Bukenya	November 1, 1991 (aged 19)			(Federation of Uganda Football Associations) Proline FC
14	MF	Mamco Kaweesa	August 11, 1988 (aged 22)			(Federation of Uganda Football Associations) Uganda Revenue Authority SC
15	MF	Ibrahim Juma	October 1, 1993 (aged 17)			(Federation of Uganda Football Associations) Bunamwaya SC
16	GK	Hamza Muwonge	November 6, 1982 (aged 28)			(Federation of Uganda Football Associations) Bunamwaya SC
17	DF	Simeon Masaba	March 23, 1984 (aged 26)			(Federation of Uganda Football Associations) Uganda Revenue Authority SC
18	MF	Owen Kasule	March 3, 1989 (aged 21)			(Federation of Uganda Football Associations) Bunamwaya SC
19	FW	Bruno Olobo	October 6, 1987 (aged 23)			(Federation of Uganda Football Associations) Kampala City Council FC
20	FW	Judah Mugalu	December 26, 1988 (aged 22)			(Federation of Uganda Football Associations) Victors FC
21	FW	Patrick Edema	August 27, 1992 (aged 18)			(Federation of Uganda Football Associations) Proline FC
22	MF	Dennis Guma	October 10, 1992 (aged 18)			(Federation of Uganda Football Associations) SC Villa
23	GK	Godfrey Wakabu	May 15, 1988 (aged 22)			(Federation of Uganda Football Associations) Kampala City Council FC

Source: Uganda Team

=== Algeria ===
Coach: Abdelhak Benchikha

No.	Pos.	Player	Date of birth (age)	Caps	Goals	Club
1	GK	Mohamed Lamine Zemmamouche	March 19, 1985 (aged 25)	3	0	(Algerian Football Federation) MC Alger
2	FW	El Arbi Hillel Soudani	November 25, 1987 (aged 23)	5	0	(Algerian Football Federation) ASO Chlef
3	DF	Samir Zazou	March 24, 1980 (aged 30)	2	0	(Algerian Football Federation) ASO Chlef
4	DF	Abdelkader Laïfaoui (c)	July 29, 1981 (aged 29)	4	0	(Algerian Football Federation) ES Sétif
5	DF	Adel Maïza	March 18, 1983 (aged 27)	5	1	(Algerian Football Federation) JSM Béjaïa
6	DF	Mohamed Yekhlef	January 12, 1981 (aged 30)	4	0	(Algerian Football Federation) ES Sétif
7	DF	Nacerdine Khoualed	April 10, 1986 (aged 24)	4	0	(Algerian Football Federation) USM Alger
8	MF	Khaled Lemmouchia	December 6, 1981 (aged 29)	3	0	(Algerian Football Federation) ES Sétif
9	MF	Bouazza Feham	April 11, 1986 (aged 24)	3	0	(Algerian Football Federation) ES Sétif
10	MF	Lazhar Hadj Aïssa	March 23, 1984 (aged 26)	4	1	(Algerian Football Federation) ES Sétif
11	FW	Moustapha Djallit	September 21, 1983 (aged 27)	7	1	(Algerian Football Federation) ES Sétif
12	FW	Youcef Ghazali	January 24, 1988 (aged 23)	5	4	(Algerian Football Federation) ES Sétif
13	DF	Abderahmane Hachoud	July 2, 1988 (aged 22)	4	0	(Algerian Football Federation) ES Sétif
14	MF	Mohamed Messaoud	November 19, 1981 (aged 29)	6	0	(Algerian Football Federation) ASO Chlef
15	DF	Essaïd Belkalem	January 1, 1989 (aged 22)	1	2	(Algerian Football Federation) JS Kabylie
16	GK	Cédric Si Mohamed	January 9, 1985 (aged 26)	5	0	(Algerian Football Federation) JSM Béjaïa
17	MF	Mourad Delhoum	November 10, 1987 (aged 23)	2	0	(Algerian Football Federation) ES Sétif
18	FW	Sid Ali Yahia-Chérif	January 4, 1985 (aged 26)	4	1	(Algerian Football Federation) JS Kabylie
19	MF	Abdelmoumene Djabou	January 31, 1987 (aged 24)	5	1	(Algerian Football Federation) ES Sétif
20	DF	Mohamed Rabie Meftah	May 5, 1985 (aged 25)	7	0	(Algerian Football Federation) JSM Béjaïa
21	FW	Ahmed Gasmi	November 22, 1984 (aged 26)	4	0	(Algerian Football Federation) JSM Béjaïa
22	GK	Azzedine Doukha	August 5, 1986 (aged 24)	1	0	(Algerian Football Federation) USM El Harrach
23	MF	Hocine Metref	January 1, 1984 (aged 27)	8	2	(Algerian Football Federation) ES Sétif

Source: Algeria Team

== Group B ==
=== Ghana ===
Coach: Herbert Addo

No.	Pos.	Player	Date of birth (age)	Caps	Goals	Club
1	GK	Sammy Adjei	September 1, 1980 (aged 30)			(Ghana Football Association) Accra Hearts of Oak SC
2	DF	Godfred Saka	November 2, 1988 (aged 22)			(Ghana Football Association) Aduana Stars
3	FW	Fuseini Nuhu	June 4, 1989 (aged 21)			(Ghana Football Association) New Edubiase United
4	DF	Alfred Nelson	August 18, 1992 (aged 18)			(Ghana Football Association) Liberty Professionals
5	MF	Abdul Basit	December 10, 1990 (aged 20)			(Ghana Football Association) Berekum Chelsea
6	DF	Sabato Mohammed	December 24, 1989 (aged 21)			(Ghana Football Association) Asante Kotoko F.C.
7	MF	Edwin Gyimah	March 9, 1991 (aged 19)			(Ghana Football Association) Wa All Stars
8	MF	Yaw Alexander Badolo	February 21, 1991 (aged 19)			(Ghana Football Association) Berekum Chelsea
9	FW	Obed Ampong	April 16, 1989 (aged 21)			(Ghana Football Association) Berekum Chelsea
10	FW	Emmanuel Clottey	August 30, 1987 (aged 23)			(Ghana Football Association) Berekum Chelsea
11	MF	Bernard Dong Bortey	September 22, 1982 (aged 28)			(Ghana Football Association) Aduana Stars
12	DF	Emmanuel Ansong	October 22, 1989 (aged 21)			(Ghana Football Association) Aduana Stars
13	FW	John Ashong	November 2, 1990 (aged 20)			(Ghana Football Association) Ashanti Gold SC
14	DF	Awudu Nafiu	December 2, 1988 (aged 22)			(Ghana Football Association) King Faisal Babes
15	FW	Bismark Idan	August 10, 1989 (aged 21)			(Ghana Football Association) Berekum Chelsea
16	GK	Isaac Amoako	August 20, 1985 (aged 25)			(Ghana Football Association) Asante Kotoko F.C.
17	MF	Coomson Daniel Larbi	October 22, 1989 (aged 21)			(Ghana Football Association) Medeama SC
18	FW	Gilbert Fiamenyo	July 6, 1992 (aged 18)			(Ghana Football Association) Heart of Lions
19	DF	Mohammed Awal	May 1, 1988 (aged 22)			(Ghana Football Association) Asante Kotoko F.C.
20	DF	Alfred Arthur	December 25, 1986 (aged 24)			(Ghana Football Association) Berekum Chelsea
21	MF	Hans Kwofie	June 10, 1989 (aged 21)			(Ghana Football Association) Medeama SC
22	GK	Stephen Adams	September 28, 1989 (aged 21)			(Ghana Football Association) Aduana Stars
23	FW	Stephen Manu	January 21, 1985 (aged 26)			(Ghana Football Association) New Edubiase United

Source: Ghana Team

=== South Africa ===
Coach: Simon Ngomane

No.	Pos.	Player	Date of birth (age)	Caps	Goals	Club
1	GK	Richard de Villiers	December 15, 1987 (aged 23)			(South African Football Association) Witbank Spurs F.C.
2	MF	Sandile Kunene	September 14, 1987 (aged 23)			(South African Football Association) Real Classic
3	MF	Katlego Mashego	November 26, 1986 (aged 24)			(South African Football Association) Baroka FC
4	MF	Humphrey Khoza	March 31, 1987 (aged 23)			(South African Football Association) Witbank Spurs F.C.
5	MF	Sandile Leping	October 21, 1987 (aged 23)			(South African Football Association) Trabzon FC
6	DF	Sphiwe Mabena	July 30, 1982 (aged 28)			(South African Football Association) African All Stars
7	DF	Ntshirane Rantho	July 9, 1986 (aged 24)			(South African Football Association) Alexandra United
8	DF	Nhlakanipho Mkhwanazi	February 27, 1989 (aged 21)			(South African Football Association) Ireland FC
9	FW	Bheki Shabangu	September 21, 1985 (aged 25)			(South African Football Association) African All Stars
10	DF	Jabulani Shongwe	February 28, 1990 (aged 20)			(South African Football Association) Mamelodi Sundowns F.C.
11	DF	Bright Mlalandle	January 14, 1993 (aged 18)			(South African Football Association) Sivutsa
12	MF	Minenhle Mthimkhulu	March 29, 1987 (aged 23)			(South African Football Association) Alexandra United
13	DF	Samuel Mabunda	April 17, 1988 (aged 22)			(South African Football Association) Black Leopards F.C.
14	DF	Sakhile Kubheka	September 14, 1989 (aged 21)			(South African Football Association) Gqikazi All Stars
15	MF	Nkosana Nkosi	July 15, 1981 (aged 29)			(South African Football Association) Alexandra United
16	GK	Jacob Mokhasi	September 29, 1982 (aged 28)			(South African Football Association) SuperSport United
17	MF	Mlungisi Nkosi	May 3, 1988 (aged 22)			(South African Football Association) Barberton Stars
18	FW	Fisimpilo Ntombela	April 29, 1989 (aged 21)			(South African Football Association) Citizen FC
19	FW	Edward Mnqele	June 16, 1987 (aged 23)			(South African Football Association) Trabzon FC
20	FW	Muzikayifani Ngidi	January 3, 1989 (aged 22)			(South African Football Association) Maluti FC
21	FW	Collen Zimba	December 20, 1983 (aged 27)			(South African Football Association) Vardos FC
22	GK	Matimba Shimange	April 10, 1985 (aged 25)			(South African Football Association) Giyani Stars
23	FW	Myron Shongwe	May 6, 1981 (aged 29)			(South African Football Association) AmaZulu F.C.

South Africa chose a "Developmental" squad which mostly consisted of players from the third tier in South African football.

Source: South Africa Team

=== Zimbabwe ===
Coach: Madinda Ndlovu

No.	Pos.	Player	Date of birth (age)	Caps	Goals	Club
1	GK	Ariel Thulani Sibanda	January 26, 1989 (aged 22)			(Zimbabwe Football Association) Highlanders
2	DF	Daniel Vheremu	March 18, 1985 (aged 25)			(Zimbabwe Football Association) Gunners
3	DF	Qadr Amini	January 26, 1990 (aged 21)			(Zimbabwe Football Association) Gunners
4	MF	Denver Mukamba	December 21, 1992 (aged 18)			(Zimbabwe Football Association) Dynamos
5	DF	David Boriwondo	October 3, 1983 (aged 27)			(Zimbabwe Football Association) Wankie
6	DF	Gilbert Mapemba	July 26, 1985 (aged 25)			(Zimbabwe Football Association) CAPS United
7	MF	Elvis Meleka	April 19, 1986 (aged 24)			(Zimbabwe Football Association) Gunners
8	FW	Charles Matambo Chiutsa	September 3, 1982 (aged 28)			(Zimbabwe Football Association) Dynamos
9	FW	Clive Kawinga	August 17, 1986 (aged 24)			(Zimbabwe Football Association) CAPS United
10	FW	Norman Maroto	July 11, 1983 (aged 27)			(Zimbabwe Football Association) Platinum
11	MF	Eric Mudzingwa	February 3, 1986 (aged 25)			(Zimbabwe Football Association) Highlanders
12	DF	Simba Nhivi	January 10, 1991 (aged 20)			(Zimbabwe Football Association) Shooting Stars
13	DF	Ben Nyahunzwi	November 30, 1987 (aged 23)			(Zimbabwe Football Association) Black Mambas
14	MF	Bhekimpilo Ncube	September 29, 1983 (aged 27)			(Zimbabwe Football Association) Platinum
15	DF	Zephania Ngodzo	January 25, 1985 (aged 26)			(Zimbabwe Football Association) Highlanders
16	GK	Tafadzwa Dube	December 19, 1984 (aged 26)			(Zimbabwe Football Association) Platinum
17	FW	Charles Sibanda	March 30, 1985 (aged 25)			(Zimbabwe Football Association) Platinum
18	MF	Joel Ngodzo	December 1, 1989 (aged 21)			(Zimbabwe Football Association) Highlanders
19	MF	Archford Gutu	August 5, 1993 (aged 17)			(Zimbabwe Football Association) Dynamos
20	MF	Brian Mapfumo	January 9, 1988 (aged 23)			(Zimbabwe Football Association) Monomotapa United
21	DF	Nyasha Mukumbi	November 30, 1987 (aged 23)			(Zimbabwe Football Association) CAPS United
22	DF	Guthrie Zhokinyi	September 3, 1983 (aged 27)			(Zimbabwe Football Association) Dynamos
23	GK	Washington Arubi	August 29, 1985 (aged 25)			(Zimbabwe Football Association) Dynamos

Sources: Zimbabwe Team Communiqué match No.12: Ghana-Zimbabwe

=== Niger ===
Coach: Harouna Doula Gabde

No.	Pos.	Player	Date of birth (age)	Caps	Goals	Club
1	GK	Moussa Alzouma	September 30, 1982 (aged 28)			(Nigerien Football Federation) Sahel SC
2	DF	Jimmy Bulus	October 22, 1986 (aged 24)			(Nigerien Football Federation) ASFAN
3	DF	Hassane Modi Baraze	March 23, 1976 (aged 34)			(Nigerien Football Federation) AS GNN
4	DF	Wyrou Abdoulaye Moussa	October 20, 1986 (aged 24)			(Nigerien Football Federation) AS GNN
5	MF	Idi Sabiou	August 15, 1990 (aged 20)			(Nigerien Football Federation) Akokana FC
6	MF	Idrissa Laouali	November 9, 1983 (aged 27)			(Nigerien Football Federation) ASFAN
7	MF	Abdoulnasser Nomaou	June 21, 1992 (aged 18)			(Nigerien Football Federation) AS Douanes
8	MF	Abdoul Aziz Abdou	April 7, 1980 (aged 30)			(Nigerien Football Federation) Sahel SC
9	FW	Issa Modibo Sidibé	December 5, 1985 (aged 25)			(Nigerien Football Federation) Akokana FC
10	FW	Abdelkader Adamou Tiemou	June 21, 1988 (aged 22)			(Nigerien Football Federation) Sahel SC
11	FW	Tukur Gambo	August 29, 1980 (aged 30)			(Nigerien Football Federation) ASFAN
12	MF	Abdoul Aziz Hamadou	January 1, 1988 (aged 23)			(Nigerien Football Federation) ASFAN
13	DF	Mohamed Chikoto	August 1, 1989 (aged 21)			(Nigerien Football Federation) Sahel SC
14	MF	Parfait Kouassi	May 24, 1987 (aged 23)			(Nigerien Football Federation) Sahel SC
15	DF	Djibril Moussa Souna	May 7, 1992 (aged 18)			(Nigerien Football Federation) ASFAN
16	GK	Pesse Essouhouna	April 21, 1986 (aged 24)			(Nigerien Football Federation) AS GNN
17	DF	Mohammed Surajo Yusuf	August 11, 1989 (aged 21)			(Nigerien Football Federation) Akokana FC
18	MF	Aminou Abdou	May 4, 1990 (aged 20)			(Nigerien Football Federation) Dan Kassawa FC
19	MF	Hinsa Issoufou	September 14, 1991 (aged 19)			(Nigerien Football Federation) ASFAN
20	DF	Abdoul Karim Moussa	May 23, 1989 (aged 21)			(Nigerien Football Federation) Sahel SC
21	MF	Hamadou Aboubacar Sadou	April 6, 1992 (aged 18)			(Nigerien Football Federation) AS Police
22	GK	Rabo Saminou	August 23, 1981 (aged 29)			(Nigerien Football Federation) Sahel SC
23	MF	Moctar Chaïbou	June 2, 1992 (aged 18)			(Nigerien Football Federation) ASFAN

Source: Niger Team

== Group C ==
=== Congo DR ===
Coach: Jean-Santos Muntubila

No.	Pos.	Player	Date of birth (age)	Caps	Goals	Club
1	GK	Robert Kidiaba	February 1, 1976 (aged 35)	25	0	(Congolese Association Football Federation) TP Mazembe
2	DF	Issama Mpeko	April 30, 1987 (aged 23)	1	0	(Congolese Association Football Federation) AS V.Club
3	DF	Patou Ebunga-Simbi	August 26, 1983 (aged 27)			(Congolese Association Football Federation) AS V.Club
4	DF	Bawaka Mabele	June 9, 1988 (aged 22)			(Congolese Association Football Federation) TP Mazembe
5	MF	Nkanu Niemba	April 23, 1986 (aged 24)			(Congolese Association Football Federation) AS V.Club
6	MF	Mihayo Kazembe	September 17, 1976 (aged 34)			(Congolese Association Football Federation) TP Mazembe
7	MF	Ngandu Kasongo	December 6, 1981 (aged 29)	12		(Congolese Association Football Federation) TP Mazembe
8	MF	Nkanu Mbiyavanga	August 15, 1988 (aged 22)			(Congolese Association Football Federation) Daring Club Motema Pembe
9	FW	Ndaya Mbangi	June 17, 1988 (aged 22)			(Congolese Association Football Federation) AS V.Club
10	FW	Trésor Salakiaku	January 26, 1987 (aged 24)			(Congolese Association Football Federation) Daring Club Motema Pembe
11	FW	Mulota Kabangu	December 31, 1985 (aged 25)			(Congolese Association Football Federation) TP Mazembe
12	DF	Mukinayi Tshiani	September 4, 1978 (aged 32)			(Congolese Association Football Federation) TP Mazembe
13	MF	Mbenza Bedi	September 11, 1984 (aged 26)	4	2	(Congolese Association Football Federation) TP Mazembe
14	MF	Emmanuel Ngudikama	September 7, 1987 (aged 23)			(Congolese Association Football Federation) AS V.Club
15	DF	Joël Kimwaki	October 14, 1986 (aged 24)			(Congolese Association Football Federation) TP Mazembe
16	GK	Ley Matampi	April 18, 1989 (aged 21)		0	(Congolese Association Football Federation) Daring Club Motema Pembe
17	MF	Bazola Tusilu	March 3, 1989 (aged 21)			(Congolese Association Football Federation) Daring Club Motema Pembe
18	DF	Gladys Bokese	September 10, 1983 (aged 27)	9	1	(Congolese Association Football Federation) Daring Club Motema Pembe
19	FW	Dioko Kaluyituka	January 2, 1987 (aged 24)	10	3	(Congolese Association Football Federation) TP Mazembe
20	DF	Jean Kasusula	August 5, 1982 (aged 28)			(Congolese Association Football Federation) TP Mazembe
21	FW	Déo Kanda	August 11, 1989 (aged 21)			(Congolese Association Football Federation) TP Mazembe
22	GK	Ndala Monga	November 11, 1988 (aged 22)		0	(Congolese Association Football Federation) FC Saint Eloi Lupopo
23	DF	Thierry Kasereka	April 26, 1994 (aged 16)			(Congolese Association Football Federation) AS V.Club

Source: Congo DR Team

=== Cameroon ===
Coach: Emmanuel N'Doumbé Bosso

No.	Pos.	Player	Date of birth (age)	Caps	Goals	Club
1	GK	Hugo Nyamé	April 16, 1986 (aged 24)			(Cameroonian Football Federation) Les Astres FC
2	MF	Joseph Momasso	December 9, 1985 (aged 25)			(Cameroonian Football Federation) Les Astres FC
3	DF	Geremi Sagong	July 20, 1986 (aged 24)			(Cameroonian Football Federation) Les Astres FC
4	DF	Gustave Moundi	February 16, 1985 (aged 25)			(Cameroonian Football Federation) Union Sportive Douala
5	DF	Jacques Bertin Nguemaleu	September 2, 1989 (aged 21)			(Cameroonian Football Federation) Union Sportive Douala
6	MF	André Ndame Ndame	November 30, 1987 (aged 23)			(Cameroonian Football Federation) Cotonsport FC de Garoua
7	FW	Clévis Ashu	January 1, 1985 (aged 26)			(Cameroonian Football Federation) Cotonsport FC de Garoua
8	MF	Akwo Tarh Ayuk Taku	December 7, 1992 (aged 18)			(Cameroonian Football Federation) Les Astres FC
9	FW	Joël Moïse Babanda	January 12, 1984 (aged 27)			(Cameroonian Football Federation) Cotonsport FC de Garoua
10	FW	Valentine Atem	August 26, 1979 (aged 31)			(Cameroonian Football Federation) Tiko United
11	FW	Ousmaïla Baba	September 26, 1986 (aged 24)			(Cameroonian Football Federation) Cotonsport FC de Garoua
12	DF	Paul Rolland Bebey Kingué	November 9, 1986 (aged 24)			(Cameroonian Football Federation) Les Astres FC
13	MF	Arnaud Monkam	February 22, 1986 (aged 24)			(Cameroonian Football Federation) Cotonsport FC de Garoua
14	DF	Jean-Patrick Abouna	September 27, 1990 (aged 20)			(Cameroonian Football Federation) Les Astres FC
15	DF	Duplex Gnagore	December 30, 1989 (aged 21)			(Cameroonian Football Federation) AS Matelots
16	GK	Lawrence Ngomé	February 23, 1979 (aged 31)			(Cameroonian Football Federation) Les Astres FC
17	DF	Jean Paul Ekane Ngah	August 28, 1989 (aged 21)			(Cameroonian Football Federation) Université FC de Ngaoundéré
18	FW	Otele Mouangue	February 5, 1989 (aged 21)			(Cameroonian Football Federation) Canon Sportif de Yaoundé
19	MF	Gislain Fopoussi	April 16, 1986 (aged 24)			(Cameroonian Football Federation) Unisport Bafang
20	MF	Franck Kom	September 18, 1991 (aged 19)			(Cameroonian Football Federation) Panthère du Ndé
21	MF	Patrick Balokog Nack	September 10, 1986 (aged 24)			(Cameroonian Football Federation) Cotonsport FC de Garoua
22	GK	Ngarwa Madouwaye	June 27, 1991 (aged 19)			(Cameroonian Football Federation) Renaissance FC de Ngoumou
23	DF	Tewidikum Tah	February 9, 1988 (aged 22)			(Cameroonian Football Federation) Yong Sports Academy

Source: Cameroon Team

=== Ivory Coast ===
Coach: Georges Kouadio

No.	Pos.	Player	Date of birth (age)	Caps	Goals	Club
1	GK	Badra Ali Sangaré	May 30, 1986 (aged 24)			(Ivorian Football Federation) Séwé Sports de San Pedro
2	MF	Marcelin Koffi	April 6, 1985 (aged 25)			(Ivorian Football Federation) Séwé Sports de San Pedro
3	MF	Georges Éric Bile	May 18, 1989 (aged 21)			(Ivorian Football Federation) Stade d'Abidjan
4	DF	Marc Goua	November 2, 1989 (aged 21)			(Ivorian Football Federation) Séwé Sports de San Pedro
5	DF	Mady Gbokoua	July 25, 1987 (aged 23)			(Ivorian Football Federation) Academie de Foot Amadou Diallo
6		Youssouf Bamba	January 20, 1987 (aged 24)			(Ivorian Football Federation) Séwé Sports de San Pedro
7		Djémory Coulibaly	December 16, 1987 (aged 23)			(Ivorian Football Federation) JCA T
8	MF	Konan Kouamé	March 17, 1982 (aged 28)			(Ivorian Football Federation) Africa Sports National
9	DF	Hervé Diomandé	June 17, 1988 (aged 22)			(Ivorian Football Federation) ASEC Mimosas
10	MF	Marc Dion Sédé	September 20, 1987 (aged 23)			(Ivorian Football Federation) Séwé Sports de San Pedro
11	FW	Adama Bakayoko	January 1, 1986 (aged 25)			(Ivorian Football Federation) ASEC Mimosas
12	MF	Jean-Paul Késsé Mangoua	December 15, 1984 (aged 26)			(Ivorian Football Federation) ASEC Mimosas
13	MF	Zoumana Koné	October 27, 1991 (aged 19)			(Ivorian Football Federation) Denguelé Sports d'Odienné
14	FW	Kévin Zougoula	April 20, 1988 (aged 22)			(Ivorian Football Federation) ASC Ouragahio
15	DF	Tiécoura Coulibaly	May 4, 1988 (aged 22)			(Ivorian Football Federation) Stella Club d'Adjamé
16	GK	Daniel Yeboah	November 13, 1984 (aged 26)			(Ivorian Football Federation) ASEC Mimosas
17	MF	Bolou Kipré	December 16, 1987 (aged 23)			(Ivorian Football Federation) Séwé Sports de San Pedro
18	MF	Patrick Kouakou	March 20, 1988 (aged 22)			(Ivorian Football Federation) ASEC Mimosas
19	MF	Ogou Akichi	April 24, 1990 (aged 20)			(Ivorian Football Federation) Academie de Foot Amadou Diallo
20	DF	Kouassi N'Goran	February 8, 1988 (aged 22)			(Ivorian Football Federation) Africa Sports National
21	MF	Bakary Koné	April 15, 1989 (aged 21)			(Ivorian Football Federation) ASEC Mimosas
22		Rouxell Franck Dérou	October 20, 1988 (aged 22)			(Ivorian Football Federation) Africa Sports National
23	GK	Abdoul Karim Cissé	October 20, 1988 (aged 22)			(Ivorian Football Federation) Africa Sports National

Source: Côte d'Ivoire Team

=== Mali ===
Coach: Amadou Pathé Diallo

No.	Pos.	Player	Date of birth (age)	Caps	Goals	Club
1	GK	Adama Kéita	May 3, 1990 (aged 20)			(Malian Football Federation) Cercle Olympique de Bamako
2	DF	Souleymane Konaté	September 20, 1989 (aged 21)			(Malian Football Federation) Jeanne d'Arc FC
3	DF	Oumar Koné	April 13, 1991 (aged 19)			(Malian Football Federation) Stade Malien
4	DF	Moussa Coulibaly	February 3, 1990 (aged 21)			(Malian Football Federation) Stade Malien
5	DF	Ousmane Diarra	December 20, 1990 (aged 20)			(Malian Football Federation) AS Korofina
6	MF	Mamoudou Simpara	November 8, 1990 (aged 20)			(Malian Football Federation) Stade Malien
7	MF	Diakalia Sangaré	May 28, 1988 (aged 22)			(Malian Football Federation) Jeanne d'Arc FC
8	MF	Mory Makan Koita	December 25, 1990 (aged 20)			(Malian Football Federation) Stade Malien
9		Cheick Tounkara	September 23, 1988 (aged 22)			(Malian Football Federation) Stade Malien
10	MF	Idrissa Traoré	May 6, 1991 (aged 19)			(Malian Football Federation) Djoliba AC
11		Alou Bagayoko	June 15, 1985 (aged 25)			(Malian Football Federation) Djoliba AC
12	MF	Idrissa Traoré	July 17, 1990 (aged 20)			(Malian Football Federation) Djoliba AC
13	FW	Salif Ballo	August 22, 1988 (aged 22)			(Malian Football Federation) AS Real Bamako
14	DF	Mahamadou Traoré	January 1, 1984 (aged 27)			(Malian Football Federation) Cercle Olympique de Bamako
15	MF	Kader Coulibaly	December 20, 1991 (aged 19)			(Malian Football Federation) AS Real Bamako
16	GK	Soumaila Diakité	August 25, 1984 (aged 26)			(Malian Football Federation) Stade Malien
17	DF	Bakary Dembélé	April 21, 1992 (aged 18)			(Malian Football Federation) Stade Malien
18	MF	Demba N'Faly Kéita	April 7, 1992 (aged 18)			(Malian Football Federation) AS Real Bamako
19	DF	Cheick Oumar Ballo	November 10, 1989 (aged 21)			(Malian Football Federation) Cercle Olympique de Bamako
20	GK	Sambou Fofana	December 25, 1993 (aged 17)			(Malian Football Federation) CS Duguwolofila
21		Boubacar Sissoko	March 15, 1989 (aged 21)			(Malian Football Federation) Association Sportive Bakaridjan de Barouéli
22		Sis Mohamed Kéita	November 19, 1990 (aged 20)			(Malian Football Federation) Cercle Olympique de Bamako
23		Seydou Ballo	March 2, 1989 (aged 21)			(Malian Football Federation) CS Duguwolofila

Source: Mali Team

== Group D ==
=== Senegal ===
Coach: Joseph Koto

No.	Pos.	Player	Date of birth (age)	Caps	Goals	Club
1	GK	Issa Ndiaye	April 19, 1991 (aged 19)			(Senegalese Football Federation) AS Douanes
2	DF	Adiouma Gaye	December 5, 1992 (aged 18)			(Senegalese Football Federation) ASC HLM
3	DF	Mame Assane Diagné	August 20, 1985 (aged 25)			(Senegalese Football Federation) CSS
4	MF	Moustapha Kassé	February 21, 1988 (aged 22)			(Senegalese Football Federation) NGB Niary Tally
5	DF	Ass Mandaw Sy	February 10, 1989 (aged 21)			(Senegalese Football Federation) NGB Niary Tally
6	DF	Babacar Dia Mbaye	November 12, 1990 (aged 20)			(Senegalese Football Federation) Touré Kunda
7	MF	Yoro Lamine Ly	August 27, 1988 (aged 22)			(Senegalese Football Federation) NGB Niary Tally
8	DF	Mame Saher Thioune	December 21, 1989 (aged 21)			(Senegalese Football Federation) Casa Sport
9	MF	Issa Sarr	October 9, 1986 (aged 24)			(Senegalese Football Federation) ASC Jaraaf
10	FW	El Hadji Adama Mbaye	December 18, 1984 (aged 26)			(Senegalese Football Federation) AS Pikine
11	FW	Sérigné Diouck	December 3, 1990 (aged 20)			(Senegalese Football Federation) ASC Linguère
12	DF	Ferdinand Gomis	March 31, 1984 (aged 26)			(Senegalese Football Federation) CSS
13	MF	Toumany Diédhiou	October 6, 1989 (aged 21)			(Senegalese Football Federation) NGB Niary Tally
14	MF	Amadou Fall Hanne	September 8, 1985 (aged 25)			(Senegalese Football Federation) CSS
15	MF	Moussa Dembélé	November 28, 1986 (aged 24)			(Senegalese Football Federation) ASC Linguère
16	GK	Khadim N'Diaye	April 5, 1985 (aged 25)			(Senegalese Football Federation) ASC Linguère
17	MF	Stéphane Badji	January 18, 1990 (aged 21)			(Senegalese Football Federation) Casa Sport
18	MF	Karamba Diallo	February 1, 1986 (aged 25)			(Senegalese Football Federation) AS Douanes
19	MF	Dominique Gomis	August 24, 1987 (aged 23)			(Senegalese Football Federation) ASC Jaraaf
20	FW	Mouhamed Niang Diop	November 27, 1987 (aged 23)			(Senegalese Football Federation) NGB Niary Tally
21	DF	Djiby Diaw Tireira	October 16, 1988 (aged 22)			(Senegalese Football Federation) NGB Niary Tally
22	FW	Pape Diop	December 25, 1986 (aged 24)			(Senegalese Football Federation) ASC Jeanne d'Arc
23	GK	Ibrahima Diakhaté	June 6, 1986 (aged 24)			(Senegalese Football Federation) Touré Kunda

Source: Senegal Team

=== Rwanda ===
Coach: (Ghana) Sellas Tetteh

No.	Pos.	Player	Date of birth (age)	Caps	Goals	Club
1	GK	Jean-Claude Ndoli	7 September 1986 (aged 24)			(Rwanda Football Federation) APR
2	FW	Yussuf Ndayishimiye	27 April 1991 (aged 19)			(Rwanda Football Federation) S.C. Kiyovu Sports
3	MF	Albert Ngabo	7 November 1986 (aged 24)			(Rwanda Football Federation) APR
4	MF	Donatien Tuyizere	28 January 1987 (aged 24)			(Rwanda Football Federation) S.C. Kiyovu Sports
5	FW	Peter Kagabo	11 November 1985 (aged 25)			(Rwanda Football Federation) Police FC
6	MF	Abouba Sibomana	24 January 1989 (aged 22)			(Rwanda Football Federation) Rayon Sports
7	MF	Jean-Baptiste Mugiraneza	17 February 1991 (aged 19)			(Rwanda Football Federation) APR
8	MF	Haruna Niyonzima	5 February 1990 (aged 20)			(Rwanda Football Federation) APR
9	FW	Jacques Tuyisenge	22 September 1991 (aged 19)			(Rwanda Football Federation) Police FC
10	FW	Emmanuel Sebanani	25 December 1993 (aged 17)			(Rwanda Football Federation) APR
11	MF	Jean-Claude Iranzi	5 October 1990 (aged 20)			(Rwanda Football Federation) APR
12	FW	Eric Serugaba	26 June 1989 (aged 21)			(Rwanda Football Federation) S.C. Kiyovu Sports
13	DF	Ismaël Nshutiyamagara	10 May 1987 (aged 23)			(Rwanda Football Federation) APR
14	MF	Aphrodis Hategekimana	23 May 1989 (aged 21)			(Rwanda Football Federation) Rayon Sports
15	DF	Didier Kapet	31 December 1986 (aged 24)			(Rwanda Football Federation) APR
16	DF	Eric Gasana	15 May 1986 (aged 24)			(Rwanda Football Federation) APR
17	DF	James Tubane	5 April 1993 (aged 17)			(Rwanda Football Federation) A.S. Kigali
18	GK	Patrick Rutayisire	30 November 1991 (aged 19)			(Rwanda Football Federation) A.S. Kigali
19	MF	Djamar Mwiseneza	21 May 1992 (aged 18)			(Rwanda Football Federation) Rayon Sports
20		Bienfait Kabanda				(Rwanda Football Federation) Etincelles
21	MF	Hussein Sibomana	17 March 1986 (aged 24)			(Rwanda Football Federation) S.C. Kiyovu Sports
22	DF	Clément Mutunzi	28 November 1985 (aged 25)			(Rwanda Football Federation) Police FC
23	GK	Jean-Luc Ndayishimiye	25 May 1991 (aged 19)			(Rwanda Football Federation) APR

Source: Communiqué match No.7: Senegal-Rwanda

=== Angola ===
Coach: Lito Vidigal

No.	Pos.	Player	Date of birth (age)	Caps	Goals	Club
1	GK	Lamá	February 1, 1981 (aged 30)			(Angolan Football Federation) Petro Atlético
2	DF	Mingo Bile	June 15, 1987 (aged 23)			(Angolan Football Federation) Primeiro de Agosto
3	MF	Osório Carvalho	June 24, 1981 (aged 29)			(Angolan Football Federation) Recreativo Caála
4	DF	Dani Massunguna	March 1, 1986 (aged 24)			(Angolan Football Federation) Primeiro de Agosto
5	DF	Kali	October 11, 1978 (aged 32)			(Angolan Football Federation) Primeiro de Agosto
6	DF	Pataca	November 30, 1990 (aged 20)			(Angolan Football Federation) Kabuscorp Club do Palanca
7	MF	Job	October 10, 1981 (aged 29)			(Angolan Football Federation) Petro Atlético
8	MF	Chara	October 10, 1981 (aged 29)			(Angolan Football Federation) Petro Atlético
9	MF	Vado Dias	January 25, 1987 (aged 24)			(Angolan Football Federation) Benfica Luanda
10	FW	Santana Carlos	June 15, 1983 (aged 27)			(Angolan Football Federation) Petro Atlético
11	MF	Avex	February 12, 1984 (aged 26)			(Angolan Football Federation) Petro Atlético
12	GK	Wilson Alegre	July 22, 1984 (aged 26)			(Angolan Football Federation) Primeiro de Agosto
13	MF	Hugo	July 27, 1979 (aged 31)			(Angolan Football Federation) Kabuscorp Club do Palanca
14	DF	Amaro	November 12, 1986 (aged 24)			(Angolan Football Federation) Primeiro de Agosto
15	MF	Miguel Quiame	September 17, 1991 (aged 19)			(Angolan Football Federation) Petro Atlético
16	MF	Adawá	October 3, 1985 (aged 25)			(Angolan Football Federation) Benfica Luanda
17	FW	Zé Kalanga	October 12, 1983 (aged 27)			(Angolan Football Federation) Recreativo do Libolo
18	FW	Love	March 14, 1979 (aged 31)			(Angolan Football Federation) Petro Atlético
19	DF	Fabrício Mafuta	November 28, 1987 (aged 23)			(Angolan Football Federation) Inter Clube de Angola
20	MF	Nary	April 30, 1987 (aged 23)			(Angolan Football Federation) Inter Clube de Angola
21	MF	Nuno Neto	November 16, 1983 (aged 27)			(Angolan Football Federation) Petro Atlético
22	GK	Lambito	March 22, 1989 (aged 21)			(Angolan Football Federation) Primeiro de Agosto
23	MF	João Martins	June 20, 1982 (aged 28)			(Angolan Football Federation) Primeiro de Agosto

Source: Angola Team

=== Tunisia ===
Coach: Sami Trabelsi

No.	Pos.	Player	Date of birth (age)	Caps	Goals	Club
1	GK	Farouk Ben Mustapha	July 1, 1989 (aged 21)			(Tunisian Football Federation) CA Bizertin
2	DF	Khaled Souissi	May 20, 1985 (aged 25)			(Tunisian Football Federation) Club Africain
3	DF	Walid Hichri	March 5, 1986 (aged 24)			(Tunisian Football Federation) Espérance
4	DF	Saifallah Hosni	October 11, 1985 (aged 25)			(Tunisian Football Federation) Stade Tunisien
5	DF	Aymen Abdennour	August 6, 1989 (aged 21)			(Tunisian Football Federation) Étoile du Sahel
6	DF	Fateh Gharbi	March 12, 1983 (aged 27)			(Tunisian Football Federation) CS Sfaxien
7	MF	Youssef Msakni	October 28, 1990 (aged 20)			(Tunisian Football Federation) Espérance
8	MF	Khaled Korbi	December 16, 1985 (aged 25)			(Tunisian Football Federation) Espérance
9	FW	Lamjed Chehoudi	May 8, 1986 (aged 24)			(Tunisian Football Federation) Étoile du Sahel
10	MF	Oussama Darragi	April 3, 1987 (aged 23)			(Tunisian Football Federation) Espérance
11	FW	Slama Gasdaoui	November 25, 1984 (aged 26)			(Tunisian Football Federation) JS Kairouanaise
12	MF	Adel Chedli	September 16, 1976 (aged 34)			(Tunisian Football Federation) Étoile du Sahel
13	MF	Wissem Ben Yahia	September 9, 1984 (aged 26)			(Tunisian Football Federation) Club Africain
14	MF	Mejdi Traoui	December 13, 1983 (aged 27)			(Tunisian Football Federation) Espérance
15	FW	Zouhaier Dhaouiadi	January 1, 1988 (aged 23)			(Tunisian Football Federation) Club Africain
16	GK	Aymen Mathlouthi	September 14, 1984 (aged 26)			(Tunisian Football Federation) Étoile du Sahel
17	DF	Iheb Mbarki	February 14, 1992 (aged 18)			(Tunisian Football Federation) CA Bizertin
18	MF	Chadi Hammami	June 14, 1986 (aged 24)			(Tunisian Football Federation) CS Sfaxien
19	FW	Hamza Younes	April 16, 1986 (aged 24)			(Tunisian Football Federation) CS Sfaxien
20	DF	Hatem Bejaoui	May 10, 1986 (aged 24)			(Tunisian Football Federation) Étoile du Sahel
21	FW	Ahmed Akaïchi	February 23, 1989 (aged 21)			(Tunisian Football Federation) Étoile du Sahel
22	GK	Rami Jeridi	September 15, 1984 (aged 26)			(Tunisian Football Federation) Stade Tunisien
23	MF	Maher Haddad	October 15, 1988 (aged 22)			(Tunisian Football Federation) CS Sfaxien

Source: Tunisia Team
