= Angola national football team =

Angola men's national football team

Angola
- Nickname(s): Sable Antelopes (Note: Portuguese: Palancas Negras, lit. 'Black Palancas'); Red Devils (Note: Portuguese: Diabos Vermelhos)
- Association: Federação Angolana de Futebol (FAF)
- Confederation: CAF (Africa)
- Sub-confederation: COSAFA (Southern Africa)
- Head coach: Aliou Cissé
- Captain: vacant
- Most caps: Flávio (91)
- Top scorer: Akwá (38)
- Home stadium: Estádio 11 de Novembro
- FIFA code: ANG
| First colours | Second colours | Third colours |

FIFA ranking
- Current: 83 (18 November 2026)
- Highest: 45 (July 2000)
- Lowest: 147 (March 2017)

First international
- Congo 3–2 Angola (Brazzaville, Congo; 8 February 1976)

Biggest win
- Angola 7–1 Swaziland (Luanda, Angola; 23 April 2000)

Biggest defeat
- Portugal 6–0 Angola (Lisbon, Portugal; 23 March 1989)

World Cup
- Appearances: 1 (first in 2006)
- Best result: Group stage (2006)

Africa Cup of Nations
- Appearances: 10 (first in 1996)
- Best result: Quarter-finals (2008, 2010, 2023)

African Nations Championship
- Appearances: 3 (first in 2011)
- Best result: Runners-up (2011)

COSAFA Cup
- Appearances: 18 (first in 1998)
- Best result: Champions (1999, 2001, 2004, 2024, 2025)
Medal record
African Nations Championship
| Silver medal – second place | 2011 Sudan | Team |
COSAFA Cup
| Gold medal – first place | 1999 Southern Africa | Team |
| Gold medal – first place | 2001 Southern Africa | Team |
| Gold medal – first place | 2004 Southern Africa | Team |
| Gold medal – first place | 2024 South Africa | Team |
| Gold medal – first place | 2025 South Africa | Team |
| Silver medal – second place | 2006 Southern Africa | Team |
| Bronze medal – third place | 1998 Southern Africa | Team |
| Bronze medal – third place | 2000 Southern Africa | Team |
| Bronze medal – third place | 2005 Mauritius, Namibia, South Africa and Zambia | Team |
- Website: faf.co.ao

The Angola national football team (Portuguese: Seleção nacional de futebol de Angola, Umbundu: Ocimunga colombola viombanjele yo Ngola) represents Angola in men's international football and is controlled by the Angolan Football Federation and nicknamed as both Palancas Negras (Black Sable antelopes) and Diabos Vermelhos (Red Devils), the team is a member of both FIFA and the Confederation of African Football (CAF).

Angola reached its highest FIFA ranking of 45th in July 2000. Their greatest accomplishment was qualifying for the 2006 World Cup, their only World Cup to date.

== History ==
Angola played their first game against Congo on 8 February 1976, losing 3–2 with goals from Giovetty and Nelson. On 26 June 1977, Cuba became Angola's first non-African opponent when the two countries met in Angola, with Angola winning 1–0. Angola entered World Cup qualifying for the first time in the 1986 qualifying competition. Angola defeated Senegal on penalties in the first round before narrowly losing to Algeria 3–2 on aggregate in the second round. That generation included great players of the nation's history like Jesus, Ndunguidi, Joseph Maluka, Alves, Vata and others.

Angola qualified for their first Africa Cup of Nations in 1996. They were drawn in Group A with South Africa, Egypt and Cameroon. They lost their first two games to Egypt and South Africa, but managed a 3–3 draw against Cameroon. They finished bottom of the group and did not reach the second round. Angola then qualified for their second successive African Cup of Nations in 1998, but again failed to reach the second round, drawing 0–0 with South Africa and 3–3 with Namibia, and losing 5–2 to Ivory Coast. Also in this generation, there were great players: Paulão, Quinzinho (who scored the first goal in the AFCON and played in FC Porto) and Joni. This national team was coached by Carlos Alhinho, who gave opportunities to young players, thus forming Angola's golden generation.

After missing the last 3 tournaments to the AFCON of 2000, 2002 and 2004, they qualified for the 2006 African Nations Cup. They recorded their first African Cup of Nations 3–2 win against Togo, two goals coming from Flávio and the other coming from Maurito. They also drew 0–0 against Congo DR and lost 3–1 against Cameroon. Angola's best performance then came in the 2008 African Nations Cup. They were drawn in Group D with Tunisia, South Africa and Senegal. They drew 1–1 and 0–0 with South Africa and Tunisia, then defeated Senegal 3–1, two goals coming from Manucho. In the quarter-finals they were beaten by event champions Egypt 2–1; Manucho scored again, finishing with four tournament goals in total.

Angola also won the COSAFA Cup in 1999, 2001 and 2004.

=== 2006 FIFA World Cup ===
The Angola national team's journey to the World Cup began in CAF preliminary rounds in an unsuccessful duel with Chad. Angola was in FIFA rankings 70 places higher but lost 3–1 to Chad, following a hat-trick by Francis Oumar (the only goals he ever scored for the national team). However, in the second leg at the Cidadela stadium Angola won 2–0, advancing on the away goals rule (3–3 on aggregate) the team played the first match under Ismael Kurtz but he was dismissed and replaced by Oliveira Gonçalves. The FAF's goal was not the World Cup but rather the AFCON, as the qualification process were for both the same. Angola was placed in group with Nigeria, Algeria, Gabon, Rwanda and Zimbabwe. The qualifiers began on June 5, 2004, with a 0–0 draw away to Algeria. In the second match, Akwá scored in the 84th minute to secure a victory over Nigeria. In the third round, Angola drew 2–2 in Libreville against Gabon, but back at the Cidadela, they defeated Rwanda with a goal from Freddy. In October of that same year, Angola beat Zimbabwe with a goal by Flávio; their first defeat came shortly after, losing 2–0 in Harare. Back at the Cidadela, Angola defeated Algeria 2–1 with goals from the duo Flávio and Akwá. The next match took place in Kano, Nigeria; Angola was losing, but Paulo Figueiredo (born in Angola to Portuguese parents) equalized. This draw left Angola and Nigeria tied at the top of group but Angola held the advantage through the head-to-head record. With two games remaining, Angola beat Gabon 3–0 at home, even though Nigeria defeated Algeria 5–2. In the final match round, on 8 October 2005, Angola faced Rwanda in Kigali. While Nigeria was beating Zimbabwe 5–1, the "hero fo kigali" appeared in the 79th minute following a cross from Zé Kalanga, Akwá headed the ball in, qualifying Angola for its first World Cup appearance. In total, Angola scored 12 goals and conceded 6, with Akwá finishing as the top scorer with 5 goals.

When picking the squad, Gonçalves sought advice from José Mourinho because his Angolan wife would have insight into players like Akwá, João Ricardo, Paulo Figueiredo, Flávio Amado, and Jamba. Angola played six warm-up games against South Korea, Mauritius, Lesotho, Argentina, Turkey and USA.

Angola played their first World Cup finals game against the Portuguese side (Ronaldo's first world cup match), who won the match 1–0, the only goal coming from Pauleta. There was a very friendly environment in and around the stadium during this match because of the links and friendship between the countries of Angola and Portugal. Angola drew 0–0 in their second game with Mexico with a great performance from João Ricardo (goalkeeper, also of Portuguese descent, and curiously conceded Cristiano Ronaldo's first career goal) he was named man of the match. Although he was the only unemployed player in the tournament, he was helping Angola as still had a chance of qualifying, but the match finished 1–1 after goals by Flávio and Sohrab Bakhtiarizadeh. Angola were eliminated from the tournament only losing one game and 11 cards in 3 Matches.

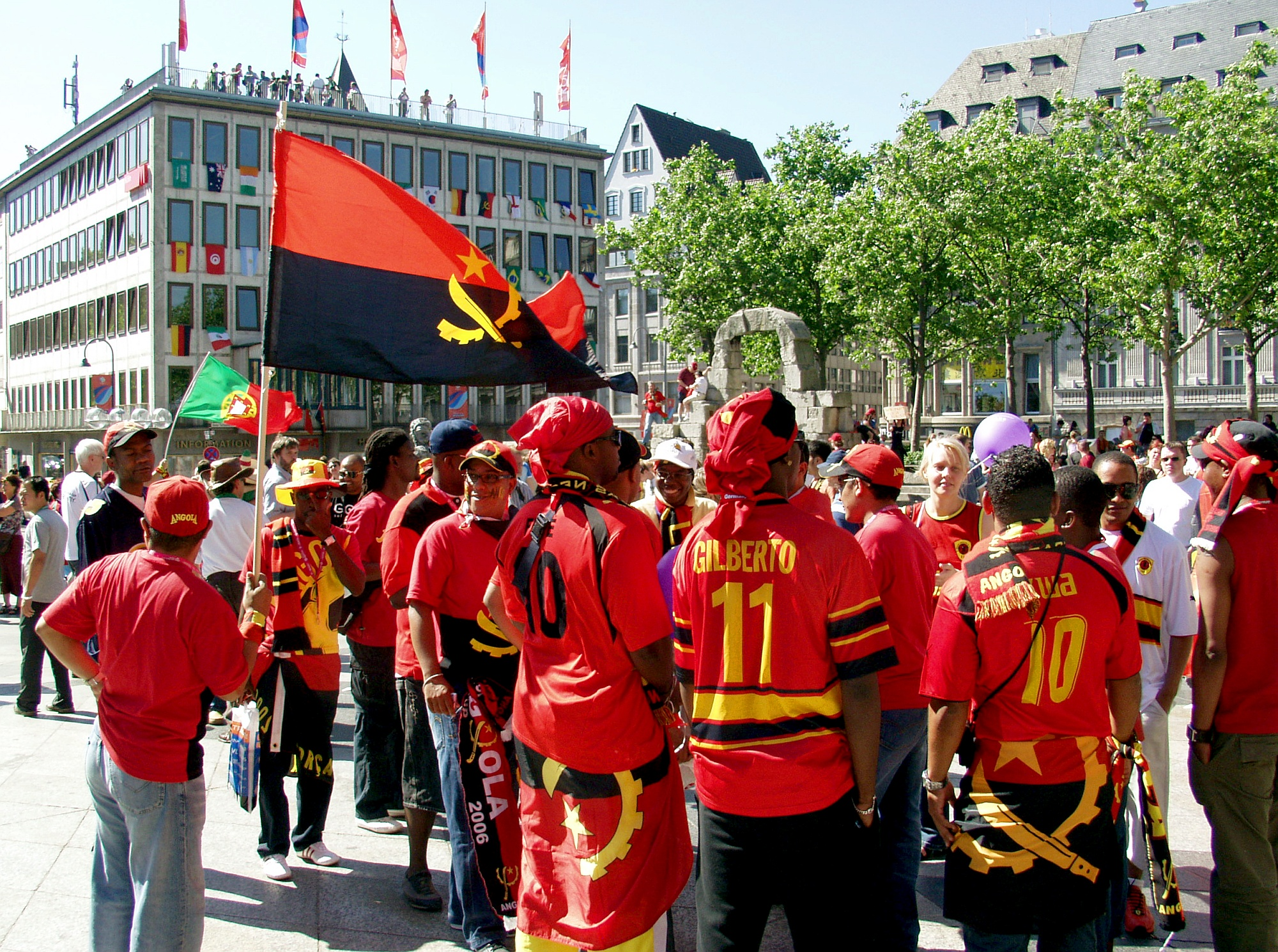
Fans of the Angola national football team in Cologne, Germany.

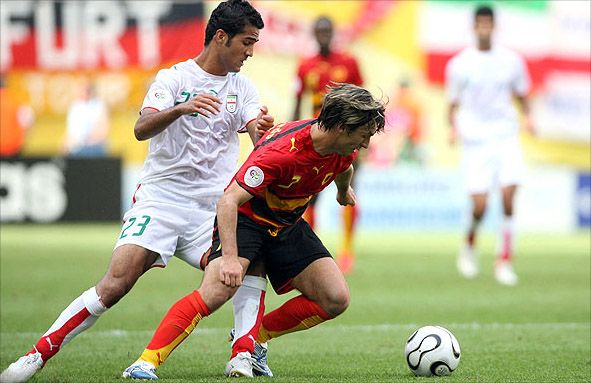
Iran versus Angola during the 2006 FIFA World Cup.

=== 2010 World Cup failure ===
After the 2006 World Cup, many of Angola's most experienced players such as Akwá and João Ricardo retired from the international game, but the expectation remained high for the team to qualify for the 2010 World Cup in South Africa. The team had a bye through the first round of qualification and in the second round they were drawn in Group 3 along with Benin, Uganda and Niger. Despite winning their first two matches, Angola failed to proceed to the third round, missing out by two points.

=== 2010 Africa Cup of Nations ===
As hosts of the 2010 Africa Cup of Nations, Angola were seeded in Group A along with Mali, Algeria, and Malawi. Coached by Manuel José, in their first game they drew 4–4 with Mali, after letting a 4–0 lead slip in the last 11 minutes (including three goals in stoppage time) and so, it became known and nicknamed "selection of almost" in Angola. They recovered from this by beating Malawi 2–0 in the second match, and topped the group by drawing 0–0 with Algeria. Were knocked out in the quarter final after a 1–0, defeat by eventual finalists Ghana.

=== Failure in AFCON 2012 and 2013 ===
After 2010, Angola came from a brilliant debut in the 2011 African Nations Championship with a silver medal and was the third team to qualify after the hosts (Equatorial Guinea and Gabon). With the core of the 2006 team and new coach Lito Vidigal, Angola featured Flávio, Kali, Gilberto, Love and Mateus, and the new generation included Djalma, Amaro, Dani Massunguna and Manucho, the latter having gone to Manchester United and playing for Valladolid at the time, having already played in the 2008 and 2010 Africa Cup of Nations. Angola was in Group-B with Burkina Faso, Sudan and Ivory Coast. In first round, with goals from Mateus and Manucho, Angola won the 2–1 against Burkina Faso. In the second game, Manucho scored 2, but Mohamed Ahmed Bashir also scored 2. The last game against pre-qualified Ivory Coast, Angola lost 2–0, but even though they were tied on points, they lost difference, with Sudan, and were eliminated. After this tournament, players like Flávio, Kali and André Macanga.

Angola returned to the Africa Cup of Nations in 2013 in South Africa (which would now be held in odd-numbered years) and played in Group-A with the host nation, Morocco and Cape Verde. Although it was not their golden generation, good players remained like goalkeeper Lamá, Manucho and Mateus Galiano. Further strength came from selections of the next generation: Neblú (a 19-year-old goalkeeper) Bastos. The first game ended in a 0–0 draw with Morocco. The second game ended in a 2–0 victory against South Africa, In the final round, Cape Verde opened the scoring with a goal by Nando, but Fernando Varela equalized. Héldon in the 91st minute to qualify Cape Verde for the next phase. Angola was eliminated from the next phase when Morocco finished with 3 points and the Blue Sharks with 5.

=== Decline and return ===
During the next two years, Angola failed to qualify for the 2014 World Cup, was eliminated by Lesotho (3–5 on penalties) in the COSAFA Cup, failed to qualify for the 2014 CHAN, and failed to qualify for the 2015 Africa Cup of Nations, ending their run in five consecutive Africa Cups. On May 13, 2015, Gelson Dala, a young player from Primeiro de Agosto, made his debut for the national team, scoring twice in Tundavala against the Central African Republic in a qualifying match for the 2017 Africa Cup of Nations. The game ended 4-0 and Angola failed to qualify.

Angola experienced a hiatus from a continental tournament until 2015 when Angola qualified for the 2016 CHAN in Rwanda against South Africa. Gelson Dala and Ary Papel (both from Primeiro de Agosto) stood out, although Angola was eliminated from the 2018 World Cup by South Africa. In the CHAN tournament, Angola performed poorly, finishing 3rd in their group with 1 win (against Ethiopia, 2–1, with a brace from Ary Papel) and 2 losses (4–2 against DRC and 1–0 against Cameroon), failing to advance to the next phase. The good news is that there was the 2018 CHAN tournament, which Angola managed to qualify for, with Dany Massunguna scoring his first and only goal for the national team against Madagascar. Returning to the COSAFA Cup, Angola fell in the group stage with only one goal scored, despite finishing 2nd in their group. There was also the qualification for the 2019 Africa Cup of Nations, where Angola debuted with a defeat (3–1) away to Burkina Faso. Qualification for the 2019 Africa Cup of Nations was paused for a year and a few months due to the 2018 World Cup.

In the 2018 CHAN tournament in Morocco, Angola drew 0–0 with Burkina Faso in their opening match but won 1–0 against Cameroon with a penalty goal by Job in the 30th minute. In the final round, Angola drew with Congo, who topped the group with 7 points, and with only one goal scored, Angola advanced from the group stage in second place. In the quarter-finals, Angola faced Nigeria, and the Palancas Negras opened the scoring with a goal from Félix Vá, but the nickname "the almost team" emerged. In the 90+2 minute, Okpotu equalized, taking the game to extra time, and in the 109th minute, Okechukwu scored, eliminating Angola from the CHAN.

After the disastrous defeat in the CHAN, Angola was eliminated in the group stage of the 2018 COSAFA Cup, again finishing 2nd in the group with 4 points. On September 9, 2018, Angola returned to qualifying for the 2019 Africa Cup of Nations, with a 1–0 victory at home against Botswana, led by Gelson Dala. A month later (at the 11 de Novembro Stadium), Angola thrashed Mauritania 4–1, with Mateus Galiano (the only player from the 2006 generation to score a brace as captain (scoring 2 years after his last goal), Djalma and Gelson scored the remaining goals in a game in Angola. Angola started losing, including the next game that Angola lost to Mauritania (1–0). In the 5th and penultimate round, in a direct confrontation against Burkina Faso (where if Angola lost, they would be out of the African Cup), at the 11 de Novembro stadium, the Angolans filled the stadium. Three minutes in, Burkina Faso hit the post, but at 45+1 Gelson Dala gave a back pass and Mateus Galiano scored, and in the second half, as in the first, Gelson passed and Mateus scored his second goal, Burkina Faso even reduced the deficit through Dayo in the 68th minute, but that's how it ended. In the last game in Botswana, Angola only needed a win to qualify for the Africa Cup of Nations on March 22, 2018. A player born in Portugal but of Angolan descent, Wilson Eduardo, made his debut for the Angolan national team, and in the 21st minute, Herenilson passed type as Iniesta, Fredy put the ball in the middle, and Igor Vetokele error but on missed, Wilson Eduardo was there to score on the rebound. Several shots from Botswana didn't go in because of Tony Cabaça, and the referee blew the whistle, and Angola was in the Africa Cup of Nations 6 years later. The players hugged, cried, etc. Angola finished first with the same 12 points as Mauritania, who were making their debut.

Angola was in Group-E at the 2019 Africa Cup of Nations with Mali, Tunísia and Mauritania. The preparation for the African Cup of Nations was very complicated because at one point the national team ran out of money, but then some players appeared, saying they were injured but they returned. After all that, Angola played a friendly against Guinea-Bissau and won 2-0 (with goals from Mabululu and Brandão). In the African Cup of Nations, Angola made its debut against Tunisia where, in the 33rd minute, a Tunisian defender entered the area and feigned a shot, causing Paizo to fall and thus resulting in a penalty for Tunisia, which Youssef Msakni converted But in the 74th minute, Mateus Galiano shot, the goalkeeper saved, and Djalma Campos scored on the rebound, doing something his father didn't do: go to the Africa Cup of Nations and score a goal. The game ended like that, and this draw gave hope to many Angolans, having tied with one of the best teams on the continent. in the second game against the same Mauritania from the qualifying phase Angola played their second game where Gelson Dala created several plays but his teammates couldn't capitalize, ending the game (0-0). In 2017, CAF decided that this edition would have 24 teams for the first time, and there was a rule for the 4 best third-placed teams. Angola was in third place and only needed a draw to advance to the next phase (since in another group, their direct opponent, South Africa, had 3 points and a goal difference of -1, but Angola had a goal difference of 0).

== Kit history ==
=== Kit manufacturer ===
| Kit providers | Period |
|---|---|
| (Germany) Adidas | 1976–1992 |
| (Denmark) Hummel | 1993–1995 |
| (Belgium) Olympic | 1996 |
| (Germany) Adidas | 1997–1999 |
| (Belgium) Olympic | 2000–2006 |
| (Germany) Puma | 2006–2012 |
| (Germany) Adidas | 2012–2018 |
| (Germany) Puma | 2018–2019 |
| (Portugal) Lacatoni | 2019–2026 |

== Results and fixtures ==
The following is a list of match results in the last 12 months, as well as any future matches that have been scheduled.

Win Draw Loss Fixture

=== 2025 ===
| 17 December FIFA Friendly | Angola | 4–1 | Mozambique | Almancil, Portugal |
| 16:00 UTC+0 | Gelson Dala 25'; Luvumbo 81'; Carmo 90'; Modesto 120' | Report | Witi 104' (pen.) | Stadium: Parque das Cidades Training Center; Attendance: Behind closed doors |
Note: The match consisted of two 45-minute halves plus a single, extra period of 30 minutes.

| 22 December 2025 AFCON RR | South Africa | 2–1 | Angola | Marrakesh, Morocco |
| 16:00 UTC+1 | Appollis 21'; Foster 79' | Report | Show 35' | Stadium: Marrakesh Stadium, Referee: Mahmood Ismail (Sudan) |

| 26 December 2025 AFCON RR | Angola | 1–1 | Zimbabwe | Marrakesh, Morocco |
| 13:30 UTC+1 | Dala 24' | Report | Musona 45+6' | Stadium: Marrakesh Stadium; Referee: Peter Waweru (Kenya) |

| 29 December 2025 AFCON RR | Angola | 0–0 | Egypt | Agadir, Morocco |
| 17:00 UTC+1 | | Report | | Stadium: Adrar Stadium; Attendance: 16,090; Referee: Clement Franklin Kpan (Ivory Coast) |

=== 2026 ===
| 5 June Friendly | Angola | Cancelled | Botswana | TBD |
| 14:00 |

| 5 June Friendly | Angola | 1–1 | Mauritania | Casablanca, Morocco |
| 20:00 | Keliano 85' | Report | Thiam 90+1' | Stadium: Larbi Zaouli Stadium; Referee: Hicham Temsamani (Morocco) |

| 9 June Friendly | Angola | 3–0 | Central African Republic | Casablanca, Morocco |
| 18:00 | Depú 7'; Mabululu 26'; Ary Papel 79' | Report | | Stadium: Larbi Zaouli Stadium |

| 25 September 2027 AFCON qualification | Egypt | 0–0 | Angola | Cairo, Egypt |
| 22:00 UTC+3 | | | | Stadium: Cairo International Stadium |

| 6 October 2026 2027 AFCON qualification | Angola | 3–1 | Malawi | Luanda, Angola |
| 20:00 UTC+1 | Milson 3'; Mabululu 38'; Miró 45+2' | Report | Gaspar 45+1' (o.g.) | Stadium: 11 November Stadium; Referee: Gerson Adolfo Micó Esono Angono (Equatorial Guinea) |

| 14 November 2027 AFCON qualification | Angola | 2–0 | South Sudan | Luanda, Angola |
| 20:00 UTC+1 | Banza 90+2'; Miro 90+8' | Report | | Stadium: 11 November Stadium; Referee: Yannick Malala (Congo DR) |

| 17 November 2027 AFCON qualification | South Sudan | 0–1 | Angola | Juba, South Sudan |
| 14:00 UTC+2 | | Report | Miro 45+1' | Stadium: Juba Stadium; Referee: Boubou Traoré (Mali) |

=== 2027 ===
| 24 March 2027 AFCON qualification | Angola | v | Egypt | TBD, Angola |
| TBD | | | | Stadium: TBD |

| 28 March 2027 AFCON qualification | Malawi | v | Angola | TBD, Malawi |
| TBD | | | | Stadium: TBD |

== Coaching staff ==
| Head coach | (Senegal) Aliou Cissé |
| Assistant coaches | unknown |
| Goalkeeping coach | unknown |
| Fitness coach | unknown |
| Match analyst | unknown |
| Doctors | unknown |
| Physiotherapists | unknown |
| Team coordinator | unknown |
| Technical director | unknown |

=== Coaching history ===
- (Hungary) József Szabó (1965 – 1966)
- (Socialist Federal Republic of Yugoslavia) Zlatko Škorić (? – ?)
- (Angola) Rubén García (? –1988)
- (Angola) Carlos Queirós (1988–?)
- (Portugal) Jesualdo Ferreira (1989)
- (Socialist Federal Republic of Yugoslavia) Dušan Kondić (? –1993)
- (Angola) Branco Arlindo (1993–?)
- (Portugal) Carlos Alhinho (1994–1995)
- (Portugal) Professor Neca (1996–1998)
- (Angola) Carlos de Abreu (1998)
- (Serbia and Montenegro) Veselin Jelušić (1998)
- (Brazil) Djalma Cavalcante (1999)
- (Portugal) Carlos Alhinho (2000)
- (Angola) Mário Calado (2000–2001)
- (Brazil) Ismael Kurtz (2002–2003)
- (Angola) Luís Oliveira Gonçalves (2003–2008)
- (Angola) Mabi de Almeida (2008–2009)
- (Portugal) Manuel José (2009–2010)
- (France) Hervé Renard (2010)
- (Angola) Zeca Amaral (2010)
- (Angola) Lito Vidigal (2011–2012)
- (Angola) Romeu Filemón (2012)
- (Uruguay) Gustavo Ferrín (2012–2013)
- (Angola) Romeu Filemón (2014–2015)
- (Angola) José Kilamba (2016–2017)
- (Brazil) Beto Bianchi (2017–2018)
- (Serbia) Srđan Vasiljević (2018–2019)
- (Portugal) Pedro Gonçalves (2019–2025)
- (France) Patrice Beaumelle (2025–2026)
- (Senegal) Aliou Cissé (2026–present)

== Players ==
=== Current squad ===
The following players were selected for the 2027 Africa Cup of Nations qualification matches in November 2026.

Caps and goals as of 17 November 2026, after the second match against South Sudan.

| No. | Pos. | Player | Date of birth (age) | Caps | Goals | Club |
|---|---|---|---|---|---|---|
| | GK | Neblú | 16 December 1993 (age 32) | 53 | 0 | (Angolan Football Federation) Petro de Luanda |
| | GK | Hugo Marques | 15 January 1986 (age 40) | 32 | 0 | (Angolan Football Federation) Petro de Luanda |
| | GK | Rui Honésimo | 1 May 1996 (age 30) | 0 | 0 | (Angolan Football Federation) Interclube |
| | DF | Jonathan Buatu | 27 September 1993 (age 33) | 67 | 2 | (Portuguese Football Federation) Gil Vicente |
| | DF | Kialonda Gaspar | 27 September 1997 (age 29) | 53 | 1 | (Italian Football Federation) Lecce |
| | DF | Tó Carneiro | 5 November 1995 (age 31) | 50 | 1 | (Royal Moroccan Football Federation) AS FAR |
| | DF | Eddie Afonso | 7 March 1994 (age 32) | 32 | 0 | (Angolan Football Federation) Petro de Luanda |
| | DF | Pedro Bondo | 16 November 2004 (age 22) | 20 | 1 | (Portuguese Football Federation) Famalicão |
| | DF | Kinito | 13 March 1998 (age 28) | 16 | 0 | (Angolan Football Federation) Petro de Luanda |
| | DF | Marsoni Sambu | 3 June 1996 (age 30) | 7 | 0 | (Royal Belgian Football Association) Dender |
| | DF | Khaly | 27 November 2003 (age 22) | 3 | 0 | (Portuguese Football Federation) Casa Pia |
| | DF | Ruben Aderito | 17 April 2003 (age 23) | 0 | 0 | (Angolan Football Federation) Petro de Luanda |
| | DF | Sandro Cruz | 12 May 2001 (age 25) | 2 | 0 | (Slovak Football Association) Slovan Bratislava |
| | DF | Jeovanni Dianganga | 15 October 1999 (age 27) | 0 | 0 | (French Football Federation) Guingamp |
| | MF | Maestro | 4 August 2003 (age 23) | 31 | 1 | (Turkish Football Federation) Alanyaspor |
| | MF | Manuel Keliano | 6 January 2003 (age 23) | 28 | 4 | (Russian Football Union) Akhmat Grozny |
| | MF | Mário Balbúrdia | 19 August 1997 (age 29) | 21 | 0 | (Angolan Football Federation) Petro de Luanda |
| | MF | Beni Mukendi | 21 May 2002 (age 24) | 9 | 0 | (Portuguese Football Federation) Vitória de Guimarães |
| | MF | Miro | 22 April 2003 (age 23) | 8 | 4 | (Russian Football Union) Dynamo Makhachkala |
| | MF | Fernandinho | 7 July 2005 (age 21) | 6 | 0 | (Angolan Football Federation) 1° de Agosto |
| | MF | Domingos Andrade | 7 May 2003 (age 23) | 4 | 0 | (Brazilian Football Confederation) Botafogo |
| | MF | Egas Cacintura | 29 October 1997 (age 29) | 0 | 0 | (Russian Football Union) Akhmat Grozny |
| | FW | Mabululu | 1 June 1992 (age 34) | 53 | 16 | (Angolan Football Federation) Wiliete de Benguela |
| | FW | Felício Milson | 12 October 1999 (age 27) | 37 | 6 | (United Arab Emirates Football Association) Al Jazira |
| | FW | Zito Luvumbo | 9 March 2002 (age 24) | 36 | 2 | (Royal Spanish Football Federation) Mallorca |
| | FW | Chico Banza | 17 December 1998 (age 27) | 26 | 1 | (Egyptian Football Association) Zamalek |
| | FW | Gilberto | 10 March 2001 (age 25) | 24 | 3 | (Angolan Football Federation) Wiliete de Benguela |
| | FW | Depú | 8 January 2000 (age 26) | 21 | 16 | (Angolan Football Federation) Petro de Luanda |

=== Recent call-ups ===
The following players have also been called up to the Angola squad within the last 12 months and are still available for selection.

| Pos. | Player | Date of birth (age) | Caps | Goals | Club | Latest call-up |
|---|---|---|---|---|---|---|
| GK | Ekumby | 2 June 2005 (age 21) | 0 | 0 | (Spain) Cádiz | v. Malawi, 6 October 2026 |
| GK | Antonio Dominique | 25 July 1994 (age 32) | 20 | 0 | Unattached | v. Central African Republic, 9 June 2026 |
| GK | Agostinho Calunga | 10 July 1998 (age 28) | 0 | 0 | (Angola) Petro de Luanda | 2025 Africa Cup of Nations |
| DF | David Carmo | 19 July 1999 (age 27) | 20 | 1 | (Greece) Olympiacos | v. South Sudan, 11 November 2026 ^{PRE} |
| DF | Núrio Fortuna | 24 March 1995 (age 31) | 26 | 0 | (Angola) Petro de Luanda | v. Malawi, 6 October 2026 |
| DF | Alexandre Abel Fernando | 25 May 1998 (age 28) | 3 | 0 | (Portugal) Portimonense | v. Malawi, 6 October 2026 |
| DF | Antonio Hossi | 12 June 2001 (age 25) | 26 | 0 | (Angola) Petro de Luanda | v. Central African Republic, 9 June 2026 |
| DF | Clinton Mata | 7 November 1992 (age 34) | 18 | 0 | (France) Lyon | 2025 Africa Cup of Nations |
| DF | Rui Modesto | 7 October 1999 (age 27) | 8 | 1 | (Canada) Vancouver Whitecaps | 2025 Africa Cup of Nations |
| MF | Show | 6 March 1999 (age 27) | 66 | 2 | (Turkey) Kocaelispor | v. South Sudan, 11 November 2026 ^{PRE} |
| MF | Randy Nteka | 6 December 1997 (age 28) | 15 | 2 | (Spain) Rayo Vallecano | v. Malawi, 6 October 2026 |
| FW | Zini | 3 July 2002 (age 24) | 35 | 9 | (Greece) AEK Athens | v. South Sudan, 11 November 2026 ^{PRE} |
| FW | Ary Papel | 3 March 1994 (age 32) | 59 | 10 | (Libya) Al Akhdar | v. Central African Republic, 9 June 2026 |
| FW | Mabilson | 7 December 2002 (age 23) | 1 | 0 | (Angola) 1° de Agosto | v. Central African Republic, 9 June 2026 |
| FW | Amorzinho | 1 January 2000 (age 26) | 0 | 0 | (Angola) Luanda City | v. Central African Republic, 9 June 2026 |
| FW | Gelson Dala | 13 July 1996 (age 30) | 57 | 22 | (Qatar) Al-Wakrah | 2025 Africa Cup of Nations |
| FW | M'Bala Nzola | 18 August 1996 (age 30) | 15 | 3 | (Italy) Cagliari | 2025 Africa Cup of Nations |
| FW | Manuel Benson | 28 March 1997 (age 29) | 9 | 0 | (Israel) Maccabi Haifa | 2025 Africa Cup of Nations |
^{DEC} Player refused to join the team after the call-up.^{INJ} Player withdrew from the squad due to an injury.^{PRE} Preliminary squad.^{RET} Player has retired from international football.^{SUS} Suspended from the national team.

== Records ==
As of 9 June 2026
Players in bold are still active with Angola.

=== Most appearances ===
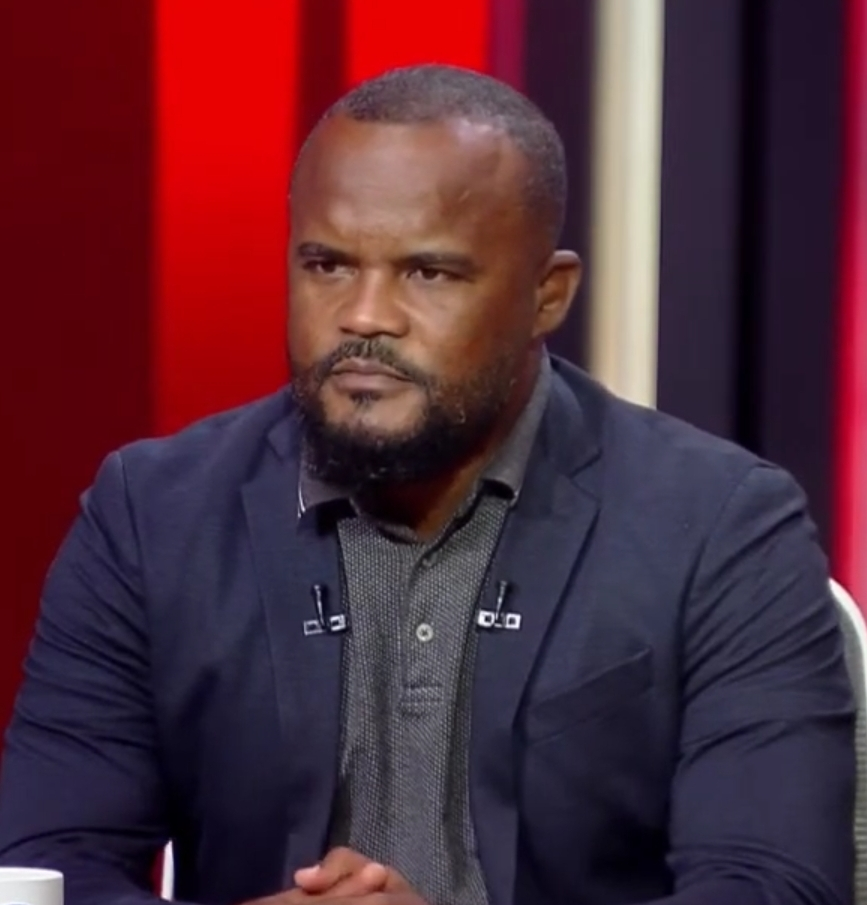
Flávio is Angola's most capped player with 91 appearances.

| Rank | Player | Caps | Goals | Career |
|---|---|---|---|---|
| 1 | Flávio | 91 | 34 | 2000–2012 |
| 2 | Gilberto | 88 | 10 | 1999–2015 |
| 3 | Love Cabungula | 85 | 16 | 2001–2017 |
| 4 | Kali | 81 | 1 | 2001–2012 |
| 5 | Akwá | 78 | 38 | 1995–2006 |
| 6 | Yamba Asha | 77 | 1 | 2000–2009 |
| 7 | André Macanga | 72 | 2 | 1999–2012 |
| 7 | Mateus | 72 | 14 | 2006–2021 |
| 9 | Fredy | 69 | 4 | 2014–2025 |
| 10 | **Show** | 65 | 2 | 2017–present |
| 10 | Vata | 65 | 20 | 1985–1993 |

=== Top goalscorers ===
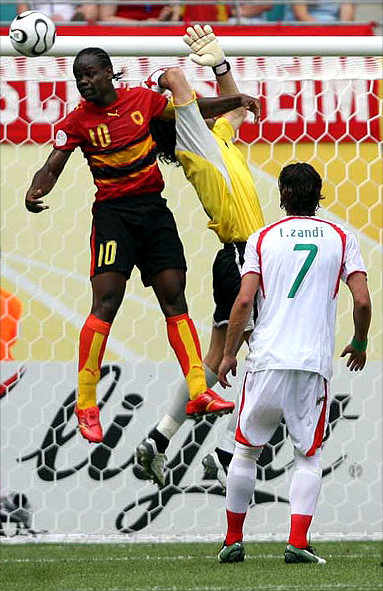
Akwá (left) is Angola's top scorer with 38 goals.

| Rank | Player | Goals | Caps | Ratio | Career |
|---|---|---|---|---|---|
| 1 | Akwá | 38 | 78 | 0.49 | 1995–2006 |
| 2 | Flávio | 34 | 91 | 0.37 | 2000–2012 |
| 3 | Manucho Gonçalves | 23 | 53 | 0.43 | 2006–2017 |
| 3 | **Gelson Dala** | 23 | 57 | 0.4 | 2015–present |
| 5 | Vata | 20 | 65 | 0.31 | 1985–1993 |
| 6 | Paulão | 19 | 52 | 0.37 | 1993–2001 |
| 7 | Jesus | 18 | 48 | 0.38 | 1979–1990 |
| 8 | **Depú** | 16 | 21 | 0.76 | 2021–present |
| 8 | Love Cabungula | 16 | 85 | 0.19 | 2001–2017 |
| 10 | **Mabululu** | 15 | 50 | 0.3 | 2013–present |

== Competitive record ==
=== FIFA World Cup ===
As of 2026, Angola has qualified once for a FIFA World Cup. Its first participation in the World Cup qualifiers was in 1986, where they won in the first round, beating Senegal 4−3 on penalty kicks. They later lost in the second round of the 1986 World Cup qualifiers to Algeria. Algeria went to the third round and qualified for the 1986 World Cup in Mexico.

Angola's first participation in the World Cup was in the 2006 World Cup, in Germany.

| FIFA World Cup record | | | | | | | | | | FIFA World Cup qualification record | | | | | |
| Year | Round | Position | Pld | W | D* | L | GF | GA | Squad | Pld | W | D | L | GF | GA |
|---|---|---|---|---|---|---|---|---|---|---|---|---|---|---|---|
| (Uruguay) 1930 | Part of Portugal | | | | | | | | | Part of Portugal | | | | | |
| (Italy) 1934 | Part of Portugal | | | | | | | | | Part of Portugal | | | | | |
| (France) 1938 | Part of Portugal | | | | | | | | | Part of Portugal | | | | | |
| (Brazil) 1950 | Part of Portugal | | | | | | | | | Part of Portugal | | | | | |
| (Switzerland) 1954 | Part of Portugal | | | | | | | | | Part of Portugal | | | | | |
| (Sweden) 1958 | Part of Portugal | | | | | | | | | Part of Portugal | | | | | |
| (Chile) 1962 | Part of Portugal | | | | | | | | | Part of Portugal | | | | | |
| (England) 1966 | Part of Portugal | | | | | | | | | Part of Portugal | | | | | |
| (Mexico) 1970 | Part of Portugal | | | | | | | | | Part of Portugal | | | | | |
| (West Germany) 1974 | Part of Portugal | | | | | | | | | Part of Portugal | | | | | |
| (Argentina) 1978 | Not a FIFA member | | | | | | | | | Not a FIFA member | | | | | |
| (Spain) 1982 | Did not enter | | | | | | | | | Declined participation | | | | | |
| (Mexico) 1986 | Did not qualify | | | | | | | | | 4 | 1 | 1 | 2 | 3 | 4 |
| (Italy) 1990 | Did not qualify | | | | | | | | | 8 | 2 | 3 | 3 | 8 | 8 |
| (United States) 1994 | Did not qualify | | | | | | | | | 5 | 1 | 2 | 2 | 3 | 4 |
| (France) 1998 | Did not qualify | | | | | | | | | 8 | 4 | 4 | 0 | 12 | 5 |
| (South Korea) (Japan) 2002 | Did not qualify | | | | | | | | | 10 | 5 | 4 | 1 | 19 | 10 |
| (Germany) 2006 | Group stage | 23rd | 3 | 0 | 2 | 1 | 1 | 2 | Squad | 12 | 7 | 3 | 2 | 15 | 9 |
| (South Africa) 2010 | Did not qualify | | | | | | | | | 6 | 3 | 1 | 2 | 11 | 8 |
| (Brazil) 2014 | Did not qualify | | | | | | | | | 6 | 1 | 4 | 1 | 7 | 5 |
| (Russia) 2018 | Did not qualify | | | | | | | | | 2 | 0 | 0 | 2 | 1 | 4 |
| (Qatar) 2022 | Did not qualify | | | | | | | | | 8 | 3 | 2 | 3 | 9 | 9 |
| (Canada) (Mexico) (United States) 2026 | Did not qualify | | | | | | | | | 10 | 2 | 6 | 2 | 9 | 8 |
| (Morocco) (Portugal) (Spain) 2030 | To be determined | | | | | | | | | To be determined | | | | | |
| (Saudi Arabia) 2034 | To be determined | | | | | | | | | To be determined | | | | | |
| Total | Group stage | 1/12 | 3 | 0 | 2 | 1 | 1 | 2 | — | 79 | 29 | 30 | 20 | 97 | 74 |

=== Africa Cup of Nations ===
| Africa Cup of Nations record | | | | | | | | | | Africa Cup of Nations qualification | | | | | |
| Year | Round | Position | Pld | W | D* | L | GF | GA | Squad | Pld | W | D | L | GF | GA |
|---|---|---|---|---|---|---|---|---|---|---|---|---|---|---|---|
| (Sudan) 1957 | Part of Portugal | | | | | | | | | Part of Portugal | | | | | |
| (United Arab Republic) 1959 | Part of Portugal | | | | | | | | | Part of Portugal | | | | | |
| (Ethiopia) 1962 | Part of Portugal | | | | | | | | | Part of Portugal | | | | | |
| (Ghana) 1963 | Part of Portugal | | | | | | | | | Part of Portugal | | | | | |
| (Tunisia) 1965 | Part of Portugal | | | | | | | | | Part of Portugal | | | | | |
| (Ethiopia) 1968 | Part of Portugal | | | | | | | | | Part of Portugal | | | | | |
| (Sudan) 1970 | Part of Portugal | | | | | | | | | Part of Portugal | | | | | |
| (Cameroon) 1972 | Part of Portugal | | | | | | | | | Part of Portugal | | | | | |
| (Egypt) 1974 | Part of Portugal | | | | | | | | | Part of Portugal | | | | | |
| (Ethiopia) 1976 | Not affiliated to CAF | | | | | | | | | Not affiliated to CAF | | | | | |
| (Ghana) 1978 | Not affiliated to CAF | | | | | | | | | Not affiliated to CAF | | | | | |
| (Nigeria) 1980 | Not affiliated to CAF | | | | | | | | | Not affiliated to CAF | | | | | |
| (Libya) 1982 | Did not qualify | | | | | | | | | 2 | 0 | 2 | 0 | 1 | 1 |
| (Ivory Coast) 1984 | Did not qualify | | | | | | | | | 4 | 2 | 1 | 1 | 7 | 4 |
| (Egypt) 1986 | Did not enter | | | | | | | | | Did not enter | | | | | |
| (Morocco) 1988 | Did not qualify | | | | | | | | | 4 | 2 | 0 | 2 | 2 | 4 |
| (Algeria) 1990 | Did not qualify | | | | | | | | | 4 | 1 | 1 | 2 | 5 | 7 |
| (Senegal) 1992 | Did not qualify | | | | | | | | | 6 | 0 | 3 | 3 | 3 | 6 |
| (Tunisia) 1994 | Did not enter | | | | | | | | | Did not enter | | | | | |
| (South Africa) 1996 | Group stage | 13th | 3 | 0 | 1 | 2 | 4 | 6 | Squad | 10 | 6 | 2 | 2 | 17 | 8 |
| (Burkina Faso) 1998 | Group stage | 13th | 3 | 0 | 2 | 1 | 5 | 8 | Squad | 4 | 2 | 0 | 2 | 4 | 4 |
| (Ghana) (Nigeria) 2000 | Did not qualify | | | | | | | | | 8 | 2 | 2 | 4 | 10 | 12 |
| (Mali) 2002 | Did not qualify | | | | | | | | | 8 | 4 | 2 | 2 | 12 | 8 |
| (Tunisia) 2004 | Did not qualify | | | | | | | | | 4 | 1 | 2 | 1 | 7 | 4 |
| (Egypt) 2006 | Group stage | 9th | 3 | 1 | 1 | 1 | 4 | 5 | Squad | 12 | 7 | 3 | 2 | 15 | 9 |
| (Ghana) 2008 | Quarter-finals | 6th | 4 | 1 | 2 | 1 | 5 | 4 | Squad | 6 | 4 | 1 | 1 | 16 | 5 |
| (Angola) 2010 | Quarter-finals | 5th | 4 | 1 | 2 | 1 | 6 | 5 | Squad | 6 | 3 | 1 | 2 | 11 | 8 |
| (Equatorial Guinea) (Gabon) 2012 | Group stage | 11th | 3 | 1 | 1 | 1 | 4 | 5 | Squad | 6 | 4 | 0 | 2 | 7 | 5 |
| (South Africa) 2013 | Group stage | 14th | 3 | 0 | 1 | 2 | 1 | 4 | Squad | 2 | 1 | 0 | 1 | 3 | 3 |
| (Equatorial Guinea) 2015 | Did not qualify | | | | | | | | | 6 | 1 | 3 | 2 | 5 | 5 |
| (Gabon) 2017 | Did not qualify | | | | | | | | | 6 | 1 | 2 | 3 | 7 | 8 |
| (Egypt) 2019 | Group stage | 18th | 3 | 0 | 2 | 1 | 1 | 2 | Squad | 6 | 4 | 0 | 2 | 9 | 6 |
| (Cameroon) 2021 | Did not qualify | | | | | | | | | 6 | 1 | 1 | 4 | 4 | 7 |
| (Ivory Coast) 2023 | Quarter-finals | 6th | 5 | 3 | 1 | 1 | 9 | 4 | Squad | 6 | 2 | 3 | 1 | 6 | 5 |
| (Morocco) 2025 | Group stage | 17th | 3 | 0 | 2 | 1 | 2 | 3 | Squad | 6 | 4 | 2 | 0 | 7 | 2 |
| (Kenya) (Tanzania) (Uganda) 2027 | To be determined | | | | | | | | | To be determined | | | | | |
| 2029 | To be determined | | | | | | | | | To be determined | | | | | |
| Total | Quarter-finals | 10/35 | 34 | 7 | 15 | 12 | 41 | 46 | — | 112 | 54 | 31 | 39 | 158 | 121 |

=== African Nations Championship ===
African Nations Championship record
| Year | Round | Position | Pld | W | D* | L | GF | GA | Squad |
|---|---|---|---|---|---|---|---|---|---|
| (Ivory Coast) 2009 | Did not qualify | | | | | | | | |
| (Sudan) 2011 | Runners-up | 2nd | 6 | 1 | 4 | 1 | 4 | 6 | Squad |
| (South Africa) 2014 | Did not qualify | | | | | | | | |
| (Rwanda) 2016 | Group stage | 11th | 3 | 1 | 0 | 2 | 4 | 5 | Squad |
| (Morocco) 2018 | Quarter-final | 8th | 4 | 1 | 2 | 1 | 2 | 2 | Squad |
| (Cameroon) 2020 | Did not qualify | | | | | | | | |
| (Algeria) 2022 | Group stage | 12th | 2 | 0 | 2 | 0 | 3 | 3 | Squad |
| Total | Champions | 4/7 | 15 | 3 | 8 | 4 | 13 | 16 | — |

=== COSAFA Cup ===
| Year | COSAFA Cup record | | | | | | |
| Year | Result | Pld | W | D | L | GF | GA |
|---|---|---|---|---|---|---|---|
| 1997 | Did not enter | | | | | | |
| 1998 | Third place | 5 | 1 | 4 | 0 | 6 | 4 |
| 1999 | Winners | 5 | 4 | 0 | 1 | 6 | 2 |
| 2000 | Semi-final | 2 | 0 | 1 | 1 | 1 | 2 |
| 2001 | Winners | 4 | 2 | 2 | 0 | 3 | 1 |
| 2002 | Quarter-final | 1 | 0 | 0 | 1 | 1 | 2 |
| 2003 | First round | 1 | 0 | 0 | 1 | 0 | 1 |
| 2004 | Winners | 4 | 2 | 2 | 0 | 4 | 2 |
| 2005 | Semi-final | 1 | 0 | 0 | 1 | 1 | 2 |
| 2006 | Runners-up | 4 | 3 | 0 | 1 | 10 | 5 |
| 2007 | Quarter-final | 2 | 1 | 1 | 0 | 2 | 0 |
| (South Africa) 2008 | See Angola national under-20 football team. | | | | | | |
| (Zimbabwe) 2009 | Quarter-final | 1 | 0 | 0 | 1 | 0 | 2 |
| (Zambia) 2013 | Plate final | 3 | 1 | 1 | 1 | 4 | 4 |
| (South Africa) 2015 | Did not enter | | | | | | |
| (Namibia) 2016 | Group stage | 3 | 0 | 0 | 3 | 0 | 7 |
| (South Africa) 2017 | Group stage | 3 | 1 | 2 | 0 | 1 | 0 |
| (South Africa) 2018 | Group stage | 3 | 1 | 1 | 1 | 2 | 2 |
| (South Africa) 2019 | Withdrew | | | | | | |
| (South Africa) ~~2020~~ | Cancelled | | | | | | |
| (South Africa) 2021 | Did not enter | | | | | | |
| (South Africa) 2022 | Group stage | 3 | 2 | 0 | 1 | 6 | 2 |
| (South Africa) 2024 | Winners | 5 | 4 | 1 | 0 | 11 | 4 |
| (South Africa) 2025 | Winners | 5 | 4 | 1 | 0 | 13 | 2 |
| Total | 18/23 | 47 | 24 | 16 | 12 | 65 | 42 |

=== Torneio dos cinco ===
| Year | Torneio dos cinco record | | | | | | |
| Year | result | Pld | W | D | L | GF | GA |
|---|---|---|---|---|---|---|---|
| (Cape Verde) 1985 | third place | 3 | 2 | 0 | 1 | 8 | 6 |

== Honours ==
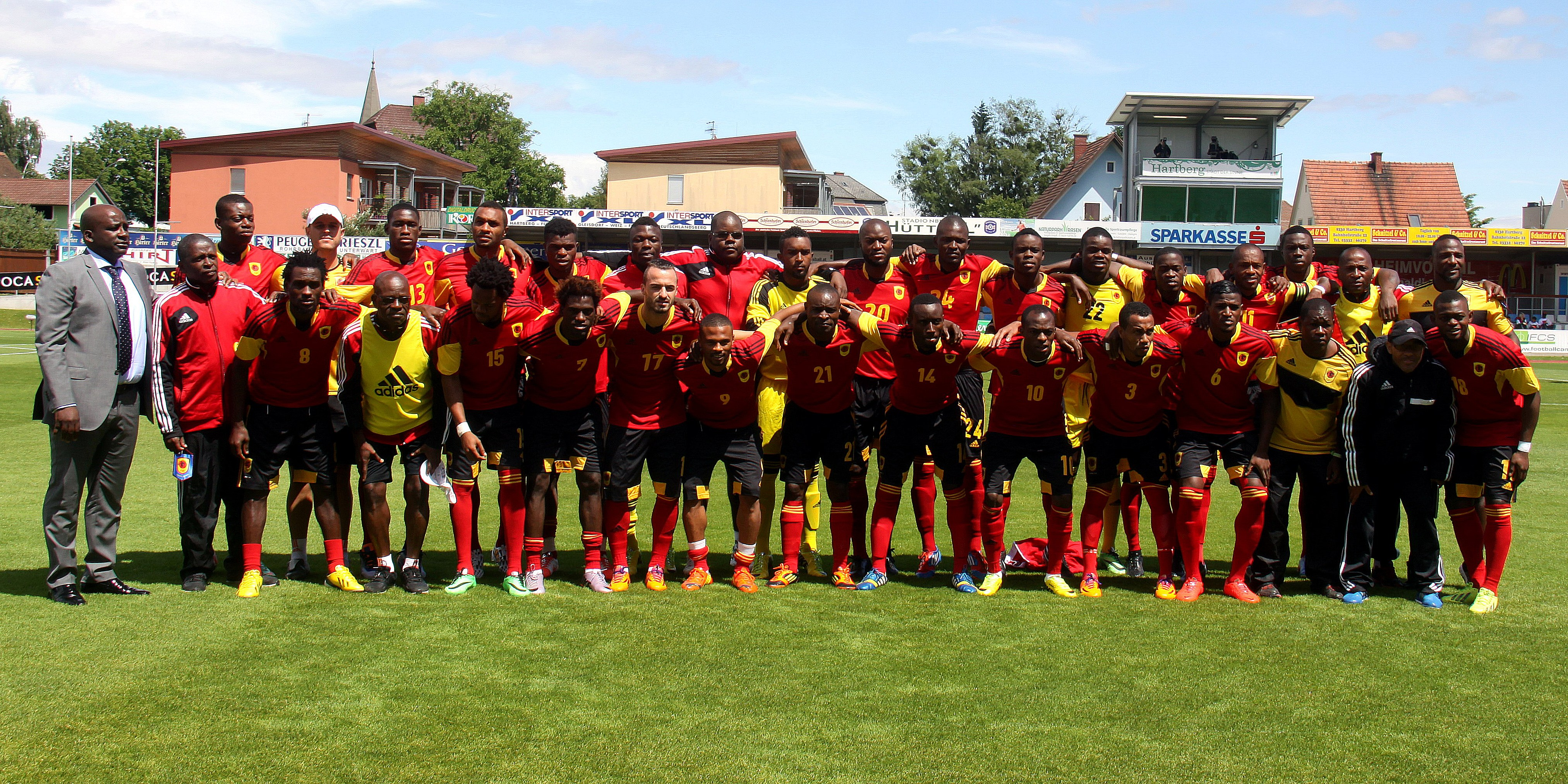
The national football team of Angola in 2014

=== Continental ===
- African Nations Championship
  - Runners-up (1): 2011

=== Regional ===
- COSAFA Cup
  - (gold) Champions (5): 1999, 2001, 2004, 2024, 2025
  - (silver) Runners-up (1): 2006
  - (bronze) Third place (3): 1998, 2000, 2005
- Central African Games
  - (silver) Silver medal (1): 1987

== Friendly Tournaments ==
- Torneio da Amizade
  - (gold) Champions:(1) 1985
- Torneio dos 5
  - (bronze) Third place: (1) 1985

=== Summary ===
| Competition | 1st place, gold medalist(s) | 2nd place, silver medalist(s) | 3rd place, bronze medalist(s) | Total |
|---|---|---|---|---|
| CAF African Nations Championship | 0 | 1 | 0 | 1 |
| Total | 0 | 1 | 0 | 1 |

== See also ==
- Angola women's national football team
- Angola national under-20 football team
- Angola national under-17 football team
- Angolan Football Federation
