= Sede =

Sede may refer to:

== People ==
- Gérard de Sède
- Marc Dion Sédé (born 1987), Ivorian football player

== Places ==
- Sede, Ethiopia
- Sede, district of Santa Maria, Brazil

== Other ==
- SEDE, the Subcommittee on Security and Defence of the European Parliament

== See also ==
- Sde (disambiguation)
- SDE (disambiguation)
