= Mouangue =

Mouangue is a Cameroonian surname. Notable people with the surname include:

- Dany Priso Mouangue (born 1994), French rugby union player
- Otele Mouangue (born 1989), Cameroonian footballer
- Serge Mouangue, Cameroonian-born artist and designer
