= SDE =

SDE may refer to:

== Science and technology ==
- Software Development Environment
- Software Development Engineer，AKAProgrammer
- Screen-door effect, a visual artifact of displays
- Sebacoyl dinalbuphine ester, an analgesic
- Semantic dictionary encoding
- Spectral density estimation
- Stochastic differential equation
- Sub-divisional error, a read head error mechanism in a linear encoder

== Transportation ==
- Vicecomodoro Ángel de la Paz Aragonés Airport, Argentina, IATA code SDE
- Senai–Desaru Expressway, in Johor, Malaysia
- Shadwell railway station, England, station code SDE

== Other uses ==
- S.D.E., a 2000 album by Cam'ron
- SDE Hockey, a Swedish women's ice hockey club
- SDE Energy, developers of SDE Sea Wave renewable energy power plant technology
- Self defined ethnicity, an ethnic classification code used by the British government and police
- Social Democratic Party (Estonia) {Sotsiaaldemokraatlik Erakond, SDE)
- Vori language, ISO 639 language code sde
