= Ismael Kurtz =

Brazilian football manager

Personal information
- Place of birth: Brazil

Managerial career
- Years: Team
- 1996: Ghana
- 2002–2003: Angola

Ismael Kurtz is a Brazilian football manager active primarily in Africa.

== Career ==
Kurtz managed the Ghana national team at the 1996 African Cup of Nations, before being appointed manager of Angola in March 2002.
