= Bennett Chenene =

South African footballer

Personal information
- Full name: Bennett Jerry Chenene
- Date of birth: 2 February 1984 (age 42)
- Place of birth: Sebokeng, South Africa
- Height: 1.64 m (5 ft 5 in)
- Position: Left winger

Team information
- Current team: Williamsville AC

Youth career
- Sasolburg Juventus

Senior career*
| Years | Team | Apps | (Gls) |
| 2004–2006 | Winners Park | 37 | (5) |
| 2006 | AmaZulu | 12 | (2) |
| 2007–2010 | Orlando Pirates | 71 | (13) |
| 2010–2011 | Bloemfontein Celtic | 23 | (1) |
| 2011–2013 | Moroka Swallows | 51 | (14) |
| 2013–2015 | SuperSport United | 30 | (6) |
| 2015 | → Pretoria (loan) | 5 | (0) |
| 2019– | Williamsville AC | | |

International career
| 2007–2008 | South Africa | 3 | (0) |
- * Club domestic league appearances and goals as of 23:00, 29 December 2019 (UTC)

Bennett Chenene (born 2 February 1984) is a South African former soccer player.

== Career ==
Chenene won the 2012 MTN 8 while playing with Moroka Swallows and the 2014 Telkom Knockout Cup with Supersport United. He earned three caps for the South Africa national soccer team.

After having been without a club for four years, Chenene was invited in December 2018 to play for Williamsville Athletic Club in the Ivory Coast, where he ended his career.

== Personal life ==
Chenene's sister, Nomvula Chenene, was murdered in 2022. Chenene believed it may have been a hate crime due to her sexuality.
