= Shere Lekgothoane =

South African soccer player

Personal information
- Full name: Peter Shere Lekgothoane
- Date of birth: 10 October 1979 (age 47)
- Place of birth: Polokwane, South Africa
- Height: 1.70 m (5 ft 7 in)
- Position: Left back

Youth career
- AC Milan (South Africa)

Senior career*
Years	Team	Apps	(Gls)
–2002	Ria Stars		
2002–2007	Jomo Cosmos		
2007–2009	Mamelodi Sundowns		
2009–2010	Mpumalanga Black Aces	21	(0)
2010–2015	Moroka Swallows	77	(0)
- * Club domestic league appearances and goals as of 11 November 2022

Peter Shere Lekgothoane (born 10 October 1979) is a South African professional soccer player who last played as a left back for Moroka Swallows. He was born in Polokwane.

== Career ==
Lekgothoane formerly played for AC Milan, Ria Stars, Jomo Cosmos, Mamelodi Sundowns and Mpumalanga Black Aces.
