= Hugo Nyamé =

Cameroonian footballer

Personal information
- Full name: Hugo Claude Patrick Nyamé
- Date of birth: 16 April 1986 (age 40)
- Place of birth: Douala, Cameroon
- Height: 1.83 m (6 ft 0 in)
- Position: Goalkeeper

Team information
- Current team: Royal AM
- Number: 16

Senior career*
Years	Team	Apps	(Gls)
2007–2014	Les Astres		
2015	Botafogo		
2016–2017	Progresso do Sambizanga	26	(0)
2018–2019	Royal Eagles	42	(0)
2019–2020	Real Kings	21	(05)
2020–2023	Royal AM	68	(0)

International career^{‡}
2013–2016	Cameroon	10	(0)
- * Club domestic league appearances and goals as of 8 July 2023 ‡ National team caps and goals as of 8 July 2023

Hugo Nyamé (born 13 April 1986) is a Cameroonian footballer who plays as a goalkeeper for Royal AM in the Premier Soccer League.

As a young player, he had a stint in Russia, but went home to Douala and played several seasons for Les Astres.

He made his international debut at the unofficial CEMAC tournament in 2010. Between 2013 and 2016 he was capped 10 times, including at the 2016 African Nations Championship. Nyamé received criticism for the match where Cameroon was eliminated by the Ivory Coast, with comparisons being drawn to Charles Itandje who had conceded nine goals at the 2014 World Cup.
