= Ashley Hartog =

South African soccer player

Personal information
- Full name: Ashley Jerome Hartog
- Date of birth: 1 September 1982 (age 44)
- Place of birth: Cape Town, South Africa
- Height: 1.80 m (5 ft 11 in)
- Positions: Striker; midfielder

Team information
- Current team: Engen Santos

Senior career*
Years	Team	Apps	(Gls)
2000–2008	Western Province United		
2007–2008	→ Sint-Truidense (loan)	5	(1)
2008–2011	FC Cape Town		
2011	→ SuperSport United (loan)	12	(3)
2011–2013	SuperSport United	43	(8)
2013–2016	Maritzburg United	43	(1)
2016	Ajax Cape Town	4	(0)
2016–	Engen Santos	0	(0)
- * Club domestic league appearances and goals as of 9 August 2016

Ashley Hartog (born 1 September 1982, in Cape Town, Western Cape) is a South African football striker who last played for Engen Santos.

== Club career ==
=== FC Fortune ===
Hartog began his career with FC Fortune, later known as Western Province United.

==== Loan to Sint-Truidense ====
In 2007, he was loaned to Jupiler League club Sint-Truidense, where he played five games, scoring one goal.

=== FC Cape Town ===
After one year in Belgium he returned to South Africa, where he played for FC Cape Town.

=== SuperSport United ===
In early 2011 Hartog joined SuperSport United on loan. The move was later made permanent.

=== Maritzburg United ===
In 2013 Hartog joined Maritzburg United on a two-year deal. On 29 January 2016 he was released by Maritzburg United, following a falling out with manager Ernst Middendorp on disciplinary grounds together with team-mate John Paintsil.

=== Ajax Cape Town ===
On 18 February 2016, Hartog signed a short-term contract with Ajax Cape Town. 3 months later he was released by Ajax Cape Town.
