= Roscoe Pietersen =

South African soccer player

Personal information
- Full name: Roscoe Heinrich Pietersen
- Date of birth: 27 January 1989 (age 37)
- Place of birth: Cape Town, South Africa
- Height: 1.83 m (6 ft 0 in)
- Position: Central defender

Team information
- Current team: Chippa United
- Number: 5

Senior career*
Years	Team	Apps	(Gls)
2012	Chippa United	0	(0)
2012–2015	SuperSport United	14	(0)
2015	AmaZulu	6	(0)
2015–2016	Vasco da Gama	22	(0)
2016–2018	Ajax Cape Town	43	(0)
2018–2021	Cape Umoya United	82	(11)
2021–2024	Chippa United	74	(1)

International career^{‡}
2017	South Africa	1	(0)
- * Club domestic league appearances and goals as of 3 October 2024 ‡ National team caps and goals as of 3 October 2024

Roscoe Pietersen (born 27 January 1989) is a South African soccer player who most recently played as a defender for Chippa United in the Premier Soccer League. He has been capped once for South Africa.

He moved from Ajax Cape Town to Cape Umoya United in 2018.

He was released by Chippa United in 2024.
