= Mohammed Kamal =

Sudanese footballer

Mohamed Kamal Eldin
Personal information
- Full name: Mohamed Kamal Eldin Fadl El-moula
- Date of birth: November 30, 1979 (age 46)
- Place of birth: Sennar, Sinnar State, Sudan
- Height: 1.97 m (6 ft 5 1/2 in)
- Position: Goalkeeper

Senior career*
Years	Team	Apps	(Gls)
1998-2002	Al-Rabita SC (Omdurman)		
2003-2005	Hilal Alsahil SC		
2006-2011	Al-Merrikh SC		
2013	Al Neel SC (Al-Hasahisa)		
2015-2016	Al-Nil SC (Shendi)		

International career
2011	Sudan	0	(0)
Medal record
Men's football
Representing Sudan
African Nations Championship
Third place	2011 Sudan
- * Club domestic league appearances and goals

Mohamed Kamal Eldin Fadl El-moula (born 30 November 1979 in Sinnar) is a Sudanese footballer who played for El-Merreikh in the Sudan Premier League.

== Career ==
Fadlulmola joined 2008 to El-Merreikh, previously played for Al-Hilal (Port Sudan). The goalkeeper played the 2009 CAF Confederations Cup and the 2010 CAF Champions League for Al-Merreikh SC.

== Honours ==
Sudan

- African Nations Championship: 3rd place, 2011
