= Joël Moïse Babanda =

Cameroonian footballer

Joël Babanda
Personal information
- Full name: Joël Moïse Babanda
- Date of birth: 12 January 1984 (age 42)
- Place of birth: Garoua, Cameroon
- Height: 1.83 m (6 ft 0 in)
- Position: Striker

Team information
- Current team: Olympique Khouribga

Senior career*
Years	Team	Apps	(Gls)
2001–2004	Racing FC Bafoussam	61	(29)
2005–2008	Cotonsport Garoua	49	(21)
2008–2010	ASO Chlef	27	(11)
2010–2011	Cotonsport Garoua	16	(6)
2012–2013	Union Sportive de Douala	16	(25)
2013–	Olympique Khouribga	6	(0)

International career
2008	Cameroon A'	19	(4)
- * Club domestic league appearances and goals as of 23 May 2013

Joël Moïse Babanda (born 12 January 1984 in Garoua) is a Cameroonian footballer who is currently playing for Olympique Khouribga.

== Career ==
Babanda began his career by Racing FC Bafoussam before moving to Cotonsport Garoua in 2005. He moved from Cotonsport Garoua to Algerian club ASO Chlef in January 2008.
