= Ashraf Hendricks =

South African soccer player

Personal information
- Full name: Ashraf Hendricks
- Date of birth: 28 July 1984 (age 42)
- Place of birth: Cape Town, South Africa
- Height: 1.87 m (6 ft 2 in)
- Position: Central defender

Senior career*
| Years | Team | Apps | (Gls) |
| 2001–2004 | Hellenic | 3 | (0) |
| 2004–2006 | Vasco da Gama | 21 | (1) |
| 2006–2009 | Bidvest Wits | 85 | (8) |
| 2009–2015 | Moroka Swallows | 104 | (4) |
| 2015–2016 | Mpumalanga Black Aces | 13 | (0) |

International career^{‡}
| 2007 | South Africa | 3 | (0) |
- * Club domestic league appearances and goals as of 17 June 2012 ‡ National team caps and goals as of 17 June 2012

Ashraf Hendricks (born 28 July 1984) is a South African former soccer player who played as a defender. He was capped for South Africa.
