= Aubrey Mathibe =

South African footballer

Personal information
- Full name: Aubrey Tlali Mathibe
- Date of birth: 16 July 1980 (age 46)
- Place of birth: Kroonstad, South Africa
- Height: 1.85 m (6 ft 1 in)
- Position: Goalkeeper

Youth career
- Kroonstad Swallows
- Unisaints FC

Senior career*
Years	Team	Apps	(Gls)
2001–2009	Kaizer Chiefs	1	(0)
2009–2013	Moroka Swallows	14	(0)
–	→ Thanda Royal Zulu (loan)		
2013–2015	AmaZulu	15	(0)
2015–2016	Moroka Swallows	25	(0)
2016–2017	Black Leopards	11	(0)
- * Club domestic league appearances and goals as of 1 January 2019

Aubrey Tlali Mathibe (born 16 July 1980 in Kroonstad, Free State) is a South African football (soccer) goalkeeper. He played for the Premier Soccer League club AmaZulu.

== Career ==
His previous clubs are Kaizer Chiefs, Moroka Swallows and Thanda Royal Zulu. Mathibe was a reserve goalkeeper for Kaizer Chiefs, making just one competitive appearance in eight years with the club.
