= Lerato Chabangu =

South African soccer player

Personal information
- Full name: Mpho Lerato Chabangu
- Date of birth: 15 August 1985 (age 41)
- Place of birth: Tembisa, South Africa
- Height: 1.78 m (5 ft 10 in)
- Position: Right winger

Youth career
- Supersport United

Senior career*
Years	Team	Apps	(Gls)
2003–2005	Pretoria University	32	(12)
2005–2009	Mamelodi Sundowns	81	(14)
2009	Supersport United	9	(0)
2009–2010	Mamelodi Sundowns	2	(0)
2011–2015	Moroka Swallows	112	(16)
2015–2016	Chippa United	7	(1)
2017–2018	Mikhado FC		
2018	Pretoria Callies		
2018–2019	Baberwa FC		

International career
–2005	South Africa U-20	6	(0)
2005–2014	South Africa	31	(2)
- * Club domestic league appearances and goals as of 17:44, 21 March 2021 (UTC)

Mpho Lerato Chabangu (born 15 August 1985) is a South African former professional association football player who played as a right winger for Baberwa FC. He previously played for the South Africa national football team.

== International ==
He made his debut in a COSAFA Cup match against the Seychelles on 26 February 2005 and was part of Bafana Bafana's 2008 African Nations Cup squad and the 2012 Afcon.

=== International goals ===
#	Date	Venue	Opponent	Score	Result	Competition
1	26 February 2005	Curepipe, Mauritius	Seychelles	3-0	3-0	COSAFA Cup
2	13 January 2008	Durban, South Africa	Mozambique	2-0	2-0	Friendly match

== Personal life ==
Following his retirement, Chabangu fell into substance abuse. In February 2025, he was admitted to a rehabilitation centre outside Polokwane.
