= Felix Obada =

Nigerian footballer (born 1989)

Personal information
- Full name: Oghenemine Felix Obada
- Date of birth: 3 November 1989 (age 37)
- Place of birth: Warri, Nigeria
- Height: 1.86 m (6 ft 1 in)
- Position: Forward

Team information
- Current team: Free Agents Football Club
- Number: 24

Youth career
- 2000–2005: Invincible Leopard
- 2005–2007: Kwara United

Senior career*
Years	Team	Apps	(Gls)
2006–2007	Kwara United	29	(18)
2007–2009	Thanda Royal Zulu	25	(15)
2009–2012	Maritzburg United	81	(7)
2012–2015	Moroka Swallows	65	(8)
2015–2016	Free State Stars	3	(0)
2016–2017	Moroka Swallows	10	(1)
2017–2018	Baf Ülkü Yurdu	33	(26)
2019–2021	Gönyeli	31	(13)
2021–2024	Küçük Kaymaklı Türk	66	(26)
2024	Yeni Boğaziçi	15	(5)
2024	Attack Energy Herat	1	(0)
2024–2025	FC Sorkh Poshan	10	(7)
2024-2025	Free Agents Football Club	28	(6)
- * Club domestic league appearances and goals

Felix Obada (born 3 November 1989) is a Nigerian professional footballer who is currently playing for Free Agents Football Club as a Forward in the Gauteng ABC Mostepe league in south Africa Third tier🇿🇦

== Career ==
Obada began his career in the youth side with Invincible Leopard. In 2005 he was transferred to Kwara United. After two years with Kwara United he was transferred to Thanda Royal Zulu.

In 2008 the Nigerian winger was eyed by Malmö FF. The Swedish top club offered trials for Obada and his companion Bernard Parker. The trial took place for two weeks and both impressed according to Bengt Madsen. This season so far at TRZ has participated in 4 games for the club, scoring 1 "thunderous" goal and signed on 18 July 2009 for Maritzburg United.
