= Mzikayise Mashaba =

South African soccer player

Personal information
- Full name: Mzikayise Mashaba
- Date of birth: 13 January 1989 (age 37)
- Place of birth: Johannesburg, South Africa
- Height: 1.75 m (5 ft 9 in)
- Positions: Left back; right midfielder; left midfielder

Team information
- Current team: Chippa United
- Number: 10

Youth career
- Jomo Cosmos
- Kempton Park
- Highlands Park
- Platinum Stars

Senior career*
| Years | Team | Apps | (Gls) |
| 2009–2011 | Platinum Stars | 1 | (0) |
| 2011–2012 | Free State Stars | 27 | (1) |
| 2012–2013 | Bidvest Wits | 20 | (0) |
| 2013–2017 | Mamelodi Sundowns | 61 | (4) |
| 2019– | Chippa United | 5 | (0) |

International career^{‡}
| 2012– | South Africa | 6 | (1) |
- * Club domestic league appearances and goals as of 23:02, 28 November 2019 (UTC) ‡ National team caps and goals as of 25 December 2013

Mzikayise Mashaba (born 13 January 1989) is a South African international footballer who most plays for Chippa United as a midfielder.

== Career ==
Born in Johannesburg, Mashaba previously played club football for Platinum Stars, Free State Stars and Bidvest Wits.

He made his international debut for South Africa in 2012.
