= Idrissa Traoré (footballer, born 1991) =

Malian footballer

Personal information
- Full name: Idrissa Traoré Essien
- Date of birth: 6 May 1991 (age 35)
- Place of birth: Bamako, Mali
- Position: Midfielder

Senior career*
Years	Team	Apps	(Gls)
2009–2010	Requins de l'Atlantique		
2010–2011	Real Bamako		
2011–2014	Djoliba		
2014	Stade Gabèsien	0	(0)
2014–2015	Stade Malien		
2015–2017	Vita Club		
2018–2019	Darnes		
2019	Shabaab al Jabal		
2019–2020	Sohar		
2020–2022	Zakho		
2022–2023	Al-Nahda		

International career^{‡}
2015–	Mali	6	(0)
- * Club domestic league appearances and goals as of 13:37, 28 March 2019 (UTC) ‡ National team caps and goals as of 13:37, 9 October 2020 (UTC)

Idrissa Traoré Essien (born 6 May 1991) is a Malian international footballer who plays, as a midfielder.

== Club career ==
Born in Bamako, Traoré has played for Requins de l'Atlantique, Real Bamako, Djoliba, Stade Gabèsien, Stade Malien, Vita Club, Darnes and Shabaab al Jabal.

On 14 August 2019 Omani club Sohar SC confirmed, that they had signed Traoré.

== International career ==
He made his international debut for Mali in 2015.
