= SDE Sea Wave =

Wave power concept developed 1996–2014

SDE Sea Wave is a type of renewable energy power plant technology utilizing sea wave energy for the production of electricity.

The SDE Sea Wave technology was developed by Israeli company SDE Energy from 1996 to 2014. The technology was invented by Shmuel Ovadia, but he initially struggled to secure investment to commercialise the technology.

== Technology ==
The system consists of horizontal buoys, with one end attached to a breakwater or another sea-based structure. These buoys move vertically in response to sea waves, creating mechanical motion that presses on a hydraulic liquid. The hydraulic system then converts this energy into circular motion, driving an electricity generator to produce power. The innovation lies in the system's self-correcting mechanism, which allows the buoys to flip over in large waves and wait for calmer conditions to reset, enhancing durability. Only 10% of the system's components are submerged, reducing exposure to corrosive sea water.

== Development and Projects ==
SDE Energy built and tested twelve different models of its wave energy system. A notable full-scale model was deployed in 2010 at Jaffa Port near Tel Aviv, producing 40 kWh of electricity over a period of two years.

In March 2010, SDE Energy announced plans to build a 250 kW model in the port of Jaffa and to develop a 100 MW power plant in locations such as the islands of Kosrae, Micronesia, and Zanzibar.

By 2012, the company was building the second of three projects in China, a 150 kW device in Dongping, Ruyuan County, with the third expected to be rated at 500 kW. Cooperation agreements were also in place to develop 100 MW of wave power in India. Plans were also announced to build SDE power plants in Ecuador and the Galápagos Islands. There is no record of any of these plans being constructed.

== Acquisition ==
By 2014, the technology rights, patents and projects had been acquired by the Chinese Blackbird International Corporation subsidiary Wave Electricity Renewable Power Ocean (WERPO).

However, in 2016 WERPO sold the technology rights to the Israeli renewable energy developer Shahar Energy.
