= Alfred Arthur =

Ghanaian footballer (born 1986)

Personal information
- Full name: Alfred Arthur
- Date of birth: 25 December 1986 (age 39)
- Place of birth: Accra, Ghana
- Height: 1.78 m (5 ft 10 in)
- Position: Left back

Youth career
- 1999–2002: Rainbow Stars
- 2002: Goldfields Soccer Academy

Senior career*
Years	Team	Apps	(Gls)
2003	Godfields Obuasi		
2004–2007	Ashanti Gold	56	(0)
2008	Wacker Innsbruck	0	(0)
2008–2009	Jagodina	7	(0)
2009–2010	Ashanti Gold		
2010–2013	Berekum Chelsea		
2013–2016	Great Olympics		

International career^{‡}
2007	Ghana	1	(0)
- * Club domestic league appearances and goals as of 10 December 2008 ‡ National team caps and goals as of 3 October 2018

Alfred Arthur (born 25 December 1986) is a Ghanaian international football defender.

== Career ==
Started with Michael Essien and Ofosu Amoah in a club called Rainbow Stars (Paa Badu Babies) in the Central Region, Ghana and later joined the Goldfields Soccer Academy from where he graduated to join the senior team Ashanti Gold SC where he will play between 2004 and 2007.

In August 2007 was on trial at German 2. Bundesliga club Greuther Fürth, in January 2008 Alfred Arthur joined with Ghana 2007 goalkeeper Emmanuel Clottey the Austrian Bundesliga team FC Wacker Innsbruck. In August 2008 he joined Serbian SuperLiga club FK Jagodina on a free transfer In Jagodina he played along with another Ghanaian footballer, Kennedy Boateng, but after one year in Serbia he turned back to Ghana.

In summer 2009 he signed with Ghana Premier League club Ashanti Gold SC. After one season, he moved, in summer 2010, to another Ghanaian top league club Berekum Chelsea.

== National team ==
He made his debut for the Black Stars in a friendly against Brazil on 27 March 2007, by coming on for the last ten minutes as a substitute. He was part of the Ghana squad at the 2011 African Nations Championship having played the last group match against Niger in the 0–1 defeat and consequent elimination.

== Honours ==
Berekum Chelsea

- Ghana Premier League: 2010–11
