= 2020 COSAFA Cup =

Tournament details
- Host country: South Africa
- City: Durban
- Dates: Cancelled

The 2020 COSAFA Cup was supposed to be the 20th edition of an annual international association football competition organized by COSAFA.

COSAFA announced at its annual general meeting on 25 January 2020 that edition would take place in Durban, South Africa between 13 and 27 June, but cancelled it on 2 October that year due to the COVID-19 pandemic in South Africa.
