= Bhekimpilo Ncube =

Zimbabwean footballer (born 1983)

Personal information
- Date of birth: 29 September 1983 (age 43)
- Place of birth: Bulawayo, Zimbabwe
- Height: 1.75 m (5 ft 9 in)
- Position: Midfielder

Senior career*
Years	Team	Apps	(Gls)
2004–2005	Wankie/Hwange		
2006	Zimbabwe Saints		
2007–2008	Dynamos		
2009–2010	Motor Action		
2011	Platinum		
2012–2013	Highlanders		
2014–2015	Chicken Inn		
2017	Bulawayo City		

International career^{‡}
2010	Zimbabwe	1	(0)
- * Club domestic league appearances and goals as of 13 November 2020 ‡ National team caps and goals as of 13 November 2020

Bhekimpilo Ncube (born 29 September 1983) is a retired Zimbabwean football midfielder.
