= Luvhengo Mungomeni =

South African soccer player

Personal information
- Full name: Luvhengo Innocent Mungomeni
- Date of birth: 18 February 1985 (age 41)
- Place of birth: Siloam, South Africa
- Height: 1.75 m (5 ft 9 in)
- Positions: Centre-back; right-back

Senior career*
Years	Team	Apps	(Gls)
2005–2006	Bush Bucks		
2006–2008	Black Leopards	33	(0)
2008–2011	Mamelodi Sundowns	41	(3)
2011–2016	Moroka Swallows	80	(3)
Total		154	(6)

International career
2012	South Africa	1	(0)
- * Club domestic league appearances and goals

Luvhengo Mungomeni (born 18 February 1985) is a South African former soccer player who played as a defender. He played club football for Bush Bucks, Black Leopards, Mamelodi Sundowns and Moroka Swallows and international football for South Africa.
