= Stephen Adams (footballer) =

Ghanaian footballer (born 1989)

Personal information
- Full name: Stephen Adams
- Date of birth: 28 September 1989 (age 37)
- Place of birth: Kumasi, Ashanti, Ghana
- Height: 1.86 m (6 ft 1 in)
- Position: Goalkeeper

Youth career
- Hearts of Oak

Senior career*
Years	Team	Apps	(Gls)
2005–2009	Real Sportive	0	(0)
2009–2017	Aduana Stars	54	(0)
2018–2019	Nkana	0	(0)
2019–2020	Accra Great Olympics	0	(0)
2021	Karela United	0	(0)

International career^{‡}
2014–2015	Ghana	10	(0)
- * Club domestic league appearances and goals as of 10 December 2022 ‡ National team caps and goals as of 10 December 2022

Stephen Adams (born 28 September 1989) is a Ghanaian former footballer who played as a goalkeeper.

== Club career ==
In 2010, Adams' club Aduana Stars won the Ghana Premier League. He was named Ghana's best domestically based goalkeeper in the same year.

== International career ==
Adams earned his first call-up for Ghana on 13 May 2010 for the 2010 FIFA World Cup.

On 13 January 2014, he made his debut for the Black Stars against Congo at the 2014 African Nations Championship. He was the team's first choice goalkeeper at the tournament, conceding only one goal in six matches as Ghana finished as runner-up to Libya.

On 2 June 2014, Adams was named in Ghana's squad for the 2014 FIFA World Cup.
