= Edward Manqele =

South African soccer player

Personal information
- Full name: Jabulani Edward Manqele
- Date of birth: 16 June 1987 (age 39)
- Place of birth: Randfontein, South Africa
- Height: 1.73 m (5 ft 8 in)
- Position: Forward

Team information
- Current team: sunrise fc

Youth career
- Liverpool FC (South Africa)
- Trabzon FC (South Africa)

Senior career*
Years	Team	Apps	(Gls)
2009–2011	Trabzon FC	?	(?)
2011–2012	Free State Stars	28	(11)
2012–2013	Mamelodi Sundowns	19	(2)
2013–2014	→ Moroka Swallows (loan)	18	(5)
2015	Chippa United	8	(2)
2015–2017	Kaizer Chiefs	18	(1)
2017–2018	Free State Stars	9	(3)
2018	Chippa United	5	(1)
2018–2019	TTM FC	26	(4)
2019	Royal Eagles	0	(0)
2019–2021	Royal AM		
2021	Pretoria Callies	4	(0)

International career
2012–2014	South Africa	4	(0)
- * Club domestic league appearances and goals as of 20:54, 12 November 2019 (UTC)

Edward Manqele (born 16 June 1987) is a South African football (soccer) striker.

== Personal ==
He hails from Mohlakeng near Randfontein. His name is also sometimes spelled (incorrectly) as "Mnqele" owing to an error on his passport. He has explained: "My name is Jabulani Edward Manqele, but Home Affairs made a mistake when I got my ID … they omitted the ‘A’ in my surname. As a result, in my passport my surname is ‘Mnqele’, which is wrong."

== Club career ==
Manqele was signed by Free State Stars from Vodacom League side Trabzon FC in 2011. He scored 11 league goals in his first season with Stars and became the transfer target of several of the top PSL sides, among them Kaizer Chiefs and Orlando Pirates.

On 22 June 2012, Manqele joined Mamelodi Sundowns on a five-year deal.

Manqele joined Moroka Swallows on a one-year loan, in August 2013.

== International career ==
As a result of his performances in the league, he won his first international cap for Bafana Bafana team in a friendly match against Senegal on 29 February 2012.
