= Gilbert Mapemba =

Zimbabwean footballer (born 1985)

Personal information
- Date of birth: 26 July 1985 (age 41)
- Height: 1.75 m (5 ft 9 in)
- Position: Defender

Senior career*
Years	Team	Apps	(Gls)
2003–2004	Circle Cement FC		
2005–2007	Buymore FC		
2008–2011	CAPS United F.C.		
2012–2014	Moroka Swallows		

International career
2009–2013	Zimbabwe	13	(0)
- * Club domestic league appearances and goals

Gilbert Mapemba (born 26 July 1985) is a Zimbabwean defender, generally playing at right back.

== Career ==
Mapemba started his career at Circle Cement FC (Zimbabwe), playing there from 2003 to 2004. He then played for Buymore FC between 2005 and 2007. He then joined CAPS United F.C. from 2008 to 2011. He then went on to join the Moroka Swallows of South Africa, where he signed a three-year deal. He was part of the Moroka Swallows team which finished second in the local Premiership for the 2011–12 season, and which won The MTN8 in 2012.

Mapemba's contract with Moroka Swallows was not renewed because of the "5 foreign player policy" in the South African Premier Soccer League, as the team wanted to add foreign strikers. He currently is a free agent.
