= Edwin Gyimah =

Ghanaian footballer

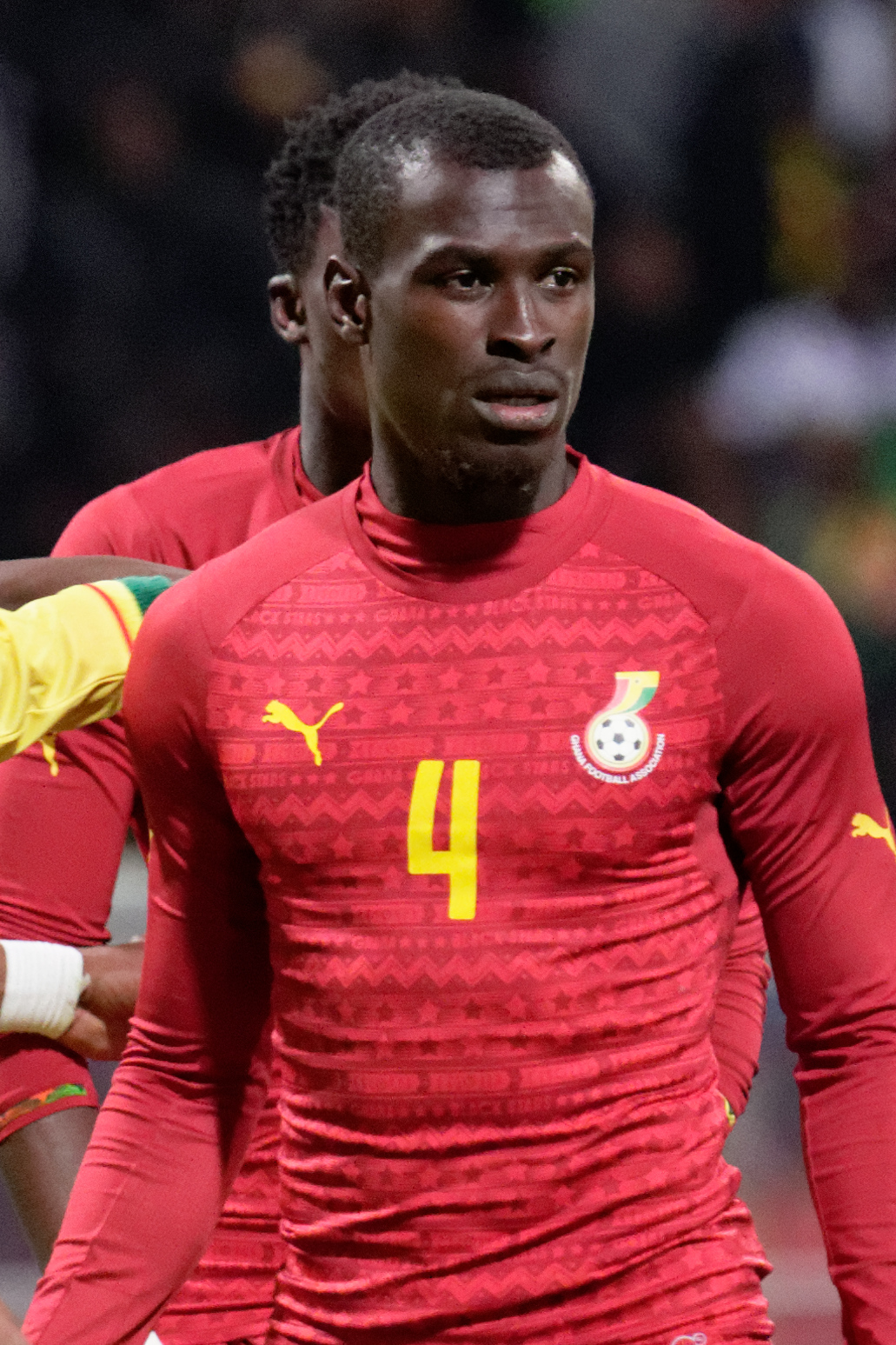

Personal information
- Date of birth: 9 March 1991 (age 35)
- Place of birth: Sekondi-Takoradi, Ghana
- Height: 1.85 m (6 ft 1 in)
- Position: Defensive midfielder

Senior career*
Years	Team	Apps	(Gls)
2008–2010	Sekondi Hasaacas		
2010–2011	All Stars		
2011–2015	SuperSport United	53	(1)
2014–2015	→ Mpumalanga Black Aces (loan)	23	(1)
2015–2017	Orlando Pirates	30	(0)
2017	Helsingborg	24	(2)
2018–2019	Bidvest Wits	19	(0)
2019–2021	Black Leopards	48	(0)
2021–2024	Sekhukhune United	60	(4)

International career^{‡}
2012–2016	Ghana	9	(0)
- * Club domestic league appearances and goals as of 12 October 2024 ‡ National team caps and goals as of 30 October 2022

Edwin Gyimah (born 9 March 1991) is a Ghanaian professional footballer who plays as a defender and midfielder. He was capped for the Ghana national football team.

== Career ==
=== Club ===
Gyimah was born in Sekondi-Takoradi. Before joining SuperSport United in 2011, Gyimah played for All Stars and Sekondi Hasaacas in his home country. Gyimah left SuperSport in 2015 after 1 goal in 53 games, a spell that also included a loan to Mpumalanga Black Aces. After leaving SuperSport, he joined Orlando Pirates. Two years and 30 appearances followed before Gyimah left the club by mutual consent on 16 February 2017. He went on to play one season with Helsingborg in Superettan, the Swedish second tier, before returning to South Africa and Bidvest Wits in early 2018.

He was released by Sekhukhune United in the summer of 2024.

=== International ===
He made his international debut for Ghana in 2012.

== Career statistics ==
=== Club ===
As of 18 February 2017.

Club statistics
Club	Season	League			Cup (Note: Includes the Nedbank Cup.)		League Cup (Note: Includes the Telkom Knockout.)		Continental (Note: Includes the CAF Confederation Cup.)		Other (Note: Includes the MTN 8.)		Total	
Club	Season	Division	Apps	Goals	Apps	Goals	Apps	Goals	Apps	Goals	Apps	Goals	Apps	Goals
Orlando Pirates	2015–16	South African Premier Division	20	0	4	0	0	0	0	0	0	0	24	0
Orlando Pirates	2016–17	South African Premier Division	10	0	0	0	3	0	—		1 (Note: One appearance in the 2016 MTN 8)	0	14	0
Orlando Pirates	Total		30	0	4	0	3	0	—		1	0	38	0
Career total			30	0	4	0	3	0	—		1	0	38	0

=== International ===
As of 18 February 2017.

National team	Year	Apps	Goals
Ghana
Ghana	2012	1	0
Ghana	2013	0	0
Ghana	2014	4	0
Ghana	2015	1	0
Ghana	2016	2	0
Ghana	2017	0	0
Total		8	0

== Honours ==
SuperSport United

- Nedbank Cup: 2011–12
- Telkom Knockout: 2014
