= Otele Mouangue =

Cameroonian footballer (born 1989)

Personal information
- Full name: Landry Giresse Mouangue Otele
- Date of birth: 5 February 1989 (age 37)
- Place of birth: Cameroon
- Height: 1.78 m (5 ft 10 in)
- Position: Forward

Senior career*
Years	Team	Apps	(Gls)
2010–2011	Union Douala		
2011–2014	FC Wil	25	(10)
2013	→ Luzern (loan)	10	(1)
2013–2014	→ Aarau (loan)	5	(0)
- * Club domestic league appearances and goals

Landry Giresse Mouangue Otele, known as Otele Mouangue (born 5 February 1989) is a Cameroonian former footballer.
