= Marc Dion Sédé =

Ivorian footballer

Marc Sédé
Personal information
- Full name: Marc Dion Sédé
- Date of birth: 10 September 1987 (age 39)
- Place of birth: Yopougon, Côte d'Ivoire
- Height: 1.70 m (5 ft 7 in)
- Position: Midfielder

Youth career
- Académie de Sol Beni

Senior career*
Years	Team	Apps	(Gls)
2005–2010	ASEC Mimosas		
2011–2016	Sabé Sports	1	(0)
2016–2017	Sidi Bouzid	8	(0)
2017–2018	Ozanköy	1	(0)
2018	Islah Bourj Shimaly	7	(1)
2018–2019	Tripoli	21	(0)
- * Club domestic league appearances and goals as of 20 April 2019

Marc Dion Sédé (born 10 September 1987) is an Ivorian professional footballer who last played as a midfielder for Lebanese Premier League club Tripoli. Sédé can play as central midfielder or a central forward.

Sédé began his youth career at Académie de Sol Beni, before joining the senior team of ASEC Mimosas in 2005.
