= Tunisia at the African Nations Championship =

Participation of Tunisia in a competition

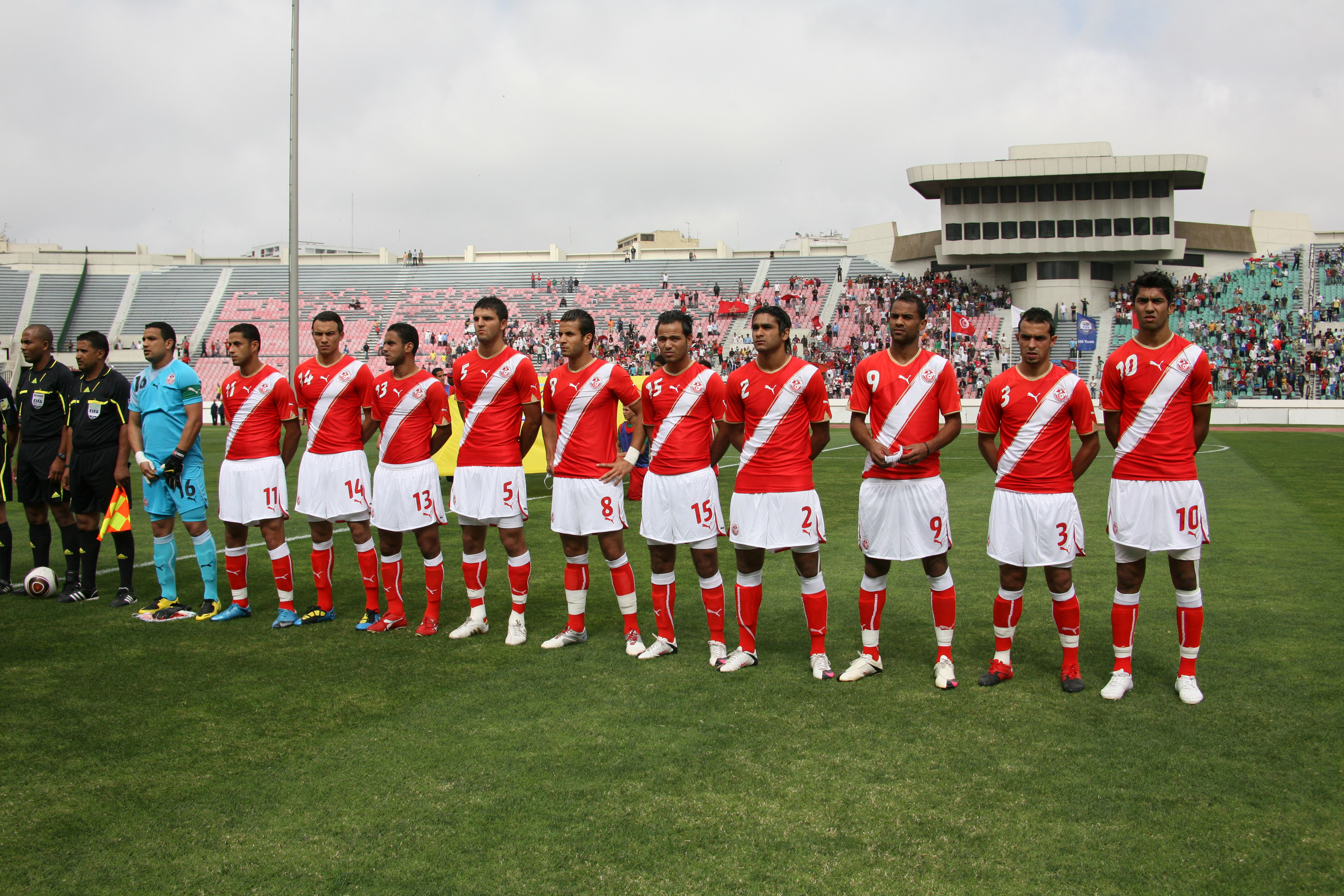
Tunisia squad for the 2011 African Nations Championship qualification against Morocco.

Tunisia has participated in two editions of the African Nations Championship. In the 2009 African Nations Championship qualification, Tunisia represented by the U-23 team, under the management of Mondher Kebaier, where Tunisiaeliminated there in the qualification phase. In 2011, under the leadership of Sami Trabelsi, Tunisia qualified for the finals and won the championship by beating Angola in the final. In 2014, placed under the direction of Nabil Maâloul, she was eliminated in the qualification phase.

In the 2016 African Nations Championship qualification, under the leadership of Henryk Kasperczak, Tunisia qualified for the finals, but Hatem Missaoui led the team in Rwanda. Tunisia was eliminated in the quarterfinals by Mali. In the next edition, the Tunisian Football Federation announced that Tunisia will not participate in the 2018 African Nations Championship due to the participation of the first team in the 2018 FIFA World Cup. In 2020 African Nations Championship qualification, Tunisia faced Libya two home and away games, winning the first match 1–0 at Stade Olympique de Radès and the second 2–1 at Stade Boubker Ammar; Anice Badri scores the goals for Tunisia in both cases. The national team qualified for the final phase but, on 20 December 2019, the qualification was withdrawn by the Tunisian Football Federation due to the intensity of the matches. The team didn't enter to the 2022 African Nations Championship qualification.

On 9 October 2024, during the draw for the 2024 African Nations Championship qualification, CAF has allocated three places for the North African region, however Algeria and Egypt have declined to participate, it was decided that Libya, Morocco and Tunisia would automatically qualify for the final tournament. However, on 9 November Tunisia withdrew again from participation after meeting with representatives of Tunisian league clubs due to the pressure of the calendar.

== Overall record ==
African Nations Championship record										African Nations Championship qualification record						
Year	Round	Position	Pld	W	D*	L	GF	GA	Squad	Pld	W	D	L	GF	GA	Ref.
(Ivory Coast) 2009	Did not qualify									2	0	2	0	2	2	
(Sudan) 2011	Champions	1st	6	4	2	0	11	3	Squad	2	0	2	0	3	3	
(South Africa) 2014	Did not qualify									2	0	1	1	0	1	
(Rwanda) 2016	Quarter-finals	8th	4	1	2	1	9	5	Squad	4	1	1	2	4	5	
(Morocco) 2018	Did not enter									Did not enter						
(Cameroon) 2020	Withdrew after qualifying (Note: Tunisia qualified against Libya after winning two matches in the qualifiers, back 1–0 and 1–2, and due to the delay in the start of the session from January to April, the candidacy was withdrawn from the Tunisian Football Federation on 20 December 2019 due to the pressure of the calendar after consulting with the Tunisian Ligue Professionnelle 1 clubs.)									2	2	0	0	3	1	
(Algeria) 2022	Did not enter									Did not enter						
(Kenya) (Tanzania) (Uganda) 2024	Withdrew after qualifying (Note: After the team was automatically qualified by the Confederation of African Football on 9 October 2024, the Tunisian Football Federation withdrew from the finals on 28 November due to the pressure of the calendar after consulting with the Tunisian Ligue Professionnelle 1 clubs.)									Qualified automatically (Note: The Confederation of African Football has allocated three places for the North African region, however Algeria and Egypt have declined to participate. On 9 October 2024, during the draw for the 2024 African Nations Championship qualification, it was decided that Libya, Morocco and Tunisia would automatically qualify for the final tournament.)						
Total	Champions	2/8	10	5	4	1	20	8	—	12	3	6	3	12	12	—

== Matches ==
Win Draw Loss

Part	Year	No.	Stage	Date	Opponent	Result	Tunisia scorers	Ref
1	(Sudan) 2011	1	Group stage	7 February 2011	Angola	1–1	Msakni 7'	
1	(Sudan) 2011	2	Group stage	11 February 2011	Rwanda	3–1	Darragi 21' Kasdaoui 32' Dhaouadi 44'	
1	(Sudan) 2011	3	Group stage	15 February 2011	Senegal	2–0	Kasdaoui 45' Korbi 88'	
1	(Sudan) 2011	4	Quarter-final	19 February 2011	DR Congo	1–0	Dhaouadi 50'	
1	(Sudan) 2011	5	Semi-final	22 February 2011	Algeria	1–1 (5–3 p)	Kasdaoui 18'	
1	(Sudan) 2011	6	Final	25 February 2011	Angola	3–0	Traoui 47' Dhaouadi 74' Darragi 80'	
2	(Rwanda) 2016	7	Group stage	18 January 2016	Guinea	2–2	Akaïchi 33', 50'	
2	(Rwanda) 2016	8	Group stage	22 January 2016	Nigeria	1–1	Akaïchi 69'	
2	(Rwanda) 2016	9	Group stage	26 January 2016	Niger	5–0	Bguir 5', 39' Akaïchi 78' Ben Amor 80' Essifi 90+1'	
2	(Rwanda) 2016	10	Quarter-final	31 January 2016	Mali	1–2	Moncer 14'	

== Tournaments ==
=== 2011 African Nations Championship ===
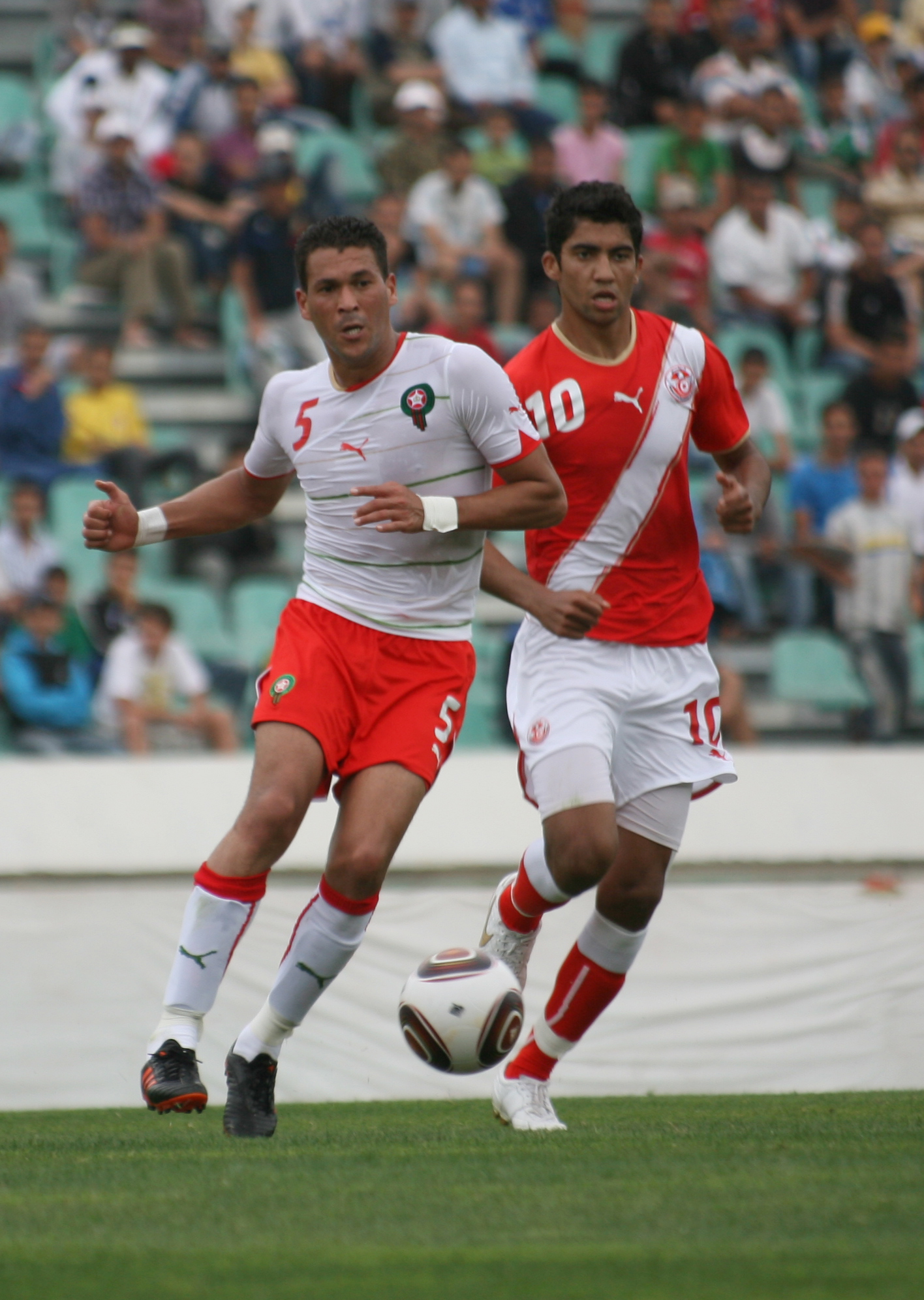
Tunisia against Morocco for the 2011 African Nations Championship qualification against at the Stade Mohammed V in Casablanca.

In 2010, under new coach Sami Trabelsi, Tunisia entered the 2011 African Nations Championship qualification, facing Morocco home and away. The first leg was played on 23 May at the Stade Olympique de Sousse in Sousse and ended in a 1–1 draw with Ammar Jemal scoring for Tunisia from a penalty kick in the 62nd minute. The second leg was played on 5 June at Stade Mohammed V in Casablanca and ended in a 2–2 draw. After trailing 0–1, Saber Khalifa scored in the 75th minute and Mehdi Meriah scored from a penalty kick in the 83rd minute. Morocco leveled the score with a goal from Rachid Soulaimani in the 85th minute. The match ended in a 2–2 draw, and Tunisia qualified for the African Nations Championship for the first time in its history thanks to away goals rule. The draw for the finals was held on 27 November in Khartoum, with Tunisia placed in Group D alongside Angola, Rwanda and Senegal.

In early 2011, Tunisia experienced a revolution and the ignition of the Arab Spring, without preparation, the team has little chance of flying to Sudan. On 7 February, Tunisia played their first match at the Port Sudan Stadium against Angola, which ended in a 1–1 draw, with Youssef Msakni scoring Tunisia's first goal in the finals. Four days later, the team achieved its first chan victory against Rwanda 3–1 with goals from Oussama Darragi, Salema Kasdaoui and Zouheir Dhaouadi. The team achieved another victory against Senegal, with a score of 2–0, with goals from Kasdaoui and Khaled Korbi, to qualify for the quarter-finals. In the quarter-finals, Tunisia faced the DR Congo, the previous edition's champions. The team managed to win, with a goal by Dhawadi's in the 50th minute. In the semi-final witnessed a strong confrontation during the Maghreb derby between Tunisia and Algeria. Kasdaoui scored Tunisia's first goal after a cross from Dhaouadi in the 18th minute, during his celebration of the goal, he took out a paper and addressed it to the camera, on which was written in arabic "Tunisia is free". While Abdelmoumene Djabou scored the equaliser for Algeria with a shot from outside the area that Aymen Mathlouthi was unable to stop. The regular and extra time ended in a 1–1 draw, with Tunisia winning on penalties 5–3, with Rami Jridi stopping Hocine Metref's kick with his fist. Tunisia qualified for the final match to face Angola.

In the final, Angola started off well, piling feverish pressure on the Eagles of Carthage through the right flank but lacked of polish with their finishing. Tunisia nearly scored in the 13th minutes but the Palancas Negras man between the woodworks Lamá made a point blank save. Three minutes after, Dhaouadi came close to scoring, but the Angolan goalkeeper anticipated well to block it from his post. Mejdi Traoui's powerful drive in the 20th minutes was punched aside by Lama who was well positioned to deny the Eagles their first goal. Adel Chedli sent the Carthage fans on their foot at the Al-Merrikh Stadium in the 37th minutes, but he missed the post by an inch. Their one-two-one-two upfront kept mesmerizing the Angolan guardsmen but their finishing were poorly executed. The north Africans returned from the interval determined. Two minutes into the second half Traoui in the ball from waist level with a right foot from Dhaouadi's cross from the left flank. Tunisia’s onslaughts began paying off from the 74th minute when Zouhaier doubled their lead with a left foot roll of the ball that went past Lamá straight into the woodwork. As the game wore on substitute Darragi put the final nail on the coffin in the 80th minutes to give the north Africans the ultimate. Dhaouadi and Kasdaoui finished the tournament as top scorers with 3 goals, and Dhaouadi was chosen as the best player. Tunisia became the first Arab country to win the African Nations Championship title, adding the title to the African Cup of Nations.

==== Group stage ====
Pos	Team	Pld	W	D	L	GF	GA	GD	Pts	Qualification
1	Tunisia	3	2	1	0	6	2	+4	7	Advance to knockout stage
2	Angola	3	1	2	0	3	2	+1	5	Advance to knockout stage
3	Senegal	3	1	1	1	2	2	0	4	
4	Rwanda	3	0	0	3	2	7	−5	0	

7 February 2011
20:00

Angola	1–1	Tunisia
Kali 90+2'	Report	Msakni 7'

Stade Port Sudan, Port Sudan
Referee: Désiré Noumandiez Doué (Ivory Coast)

11 February 2011
17:30

Tunisia	3–1	Rwanda
Darragi 21'; Kasdaoui 32'; Dhaouadi 44'	Report	Tuyisenge 23'

Stade Port Sudan, Port Sudan
Referee: Bakary Gassama (Gambia)

15 February 2011
20:00

Senegal	0–2	Tunisia
	Report	Kasdaoui 45'; Korbi 88'

Stade Port Sudan, Port Sudan
Referee: Khalid Abdel Rahman (Sudan)

==== Quarter-finals ====
19 February 2011
20:30

Tunisia	1–0	DR Congo
Dhaouadi 50'	Report

Khartoum Stadium, Khartoum
Referee: Koman Coulibaly (Mali)

==== Semi-finals ====
22 February 2011
17:00

Algeria	1–1 (a.e.t.)	Tunisia
Djabou 62'	Report	Kasdaoui 18'
Penalties
Feham (penalty scored); Lemmouchia (penalty scored); Meftah (penalty scored); Metref (penalty missed)	3–5	(penalty scored) Darragi; (penalty scored) Souissi; (penalty scored) Gharbi; (penalty scored) Hicheri; (penalty scored) Korbi

Khartoum Stadium, Khartoum
Referee: Rajindraparsad Seechurn (Mauritius)

==== Final ====
25 February 2011
20:30

Tunisia	3–0	Angola
Traoui 47'; Dhaouadi 74'; Darragi 80'	Report

Al Merreikh Stadium, Omdurman
Attendance: 40000
Referee: Daniel Bennett (South Africa)

Tunisia	Angola

Tunisia:
GK	16	Aymen Mathlouthi
DF	2	Khaled Souissi
DF	3	Walid Hichri
DF	5	Aymen Abdennour
DF	6	Fateh Gharbi	(yellow card) 60'
MF	7	Youssef Msakni		(substituted off) 85'
MF	8	Khaled Korbi	(yellow card) 45'
MF	12	Adel Chedli	(yellow card) 31'	(substituted off) 77'
MF	14	Mejdi Traoui
FW	11	Salema Kasdaoui
FW	15	Zouheir Dhaouadi	(yellow card) 36'	(substituted off) 89'
Substitutes:
MF	10	Oussama Darragi		(substituted in) 77'
MF	13	Wissem Ben Yahia		(substituted in) 85'
FW	9	Lamjed Chehoudi		(substituted in) 89'
Manager:
Sami Trabelsi

Angola:
GK	1	Lamá
DF	3	Osório Carvalho
DF	5	Kali
DF	14	Amaro
DF	19	Fabrício Mafuta
MF	8	Chara
MF	13	Hugo	(substituted off) 57'
MF	15	Miguel Quiame	(substituted off) 76'
MF	20	Nary	(substituted off) 83'
FW	10	Santana Carlos
FW	23	João Martins
Substitutes:
MF	7	Job	(substituted in) 83'
FW	17	Zé Kalanga	(substituted in) 57'
FW	18	Love	(substituted in) 76'
Manager:
Lito Vidigal

Assistant referees:
Jason Damoo (Seychelles)
Angesom Ogbamariam (Eritrea)
Fourth official:
Mohamed Ragab (Libya)

=== 2016 African Nations Championship ===
During the finals in Rwanda, Hatem Missaoui led the team. Tunisia was drawn in Group C alongside Guinea, Nigeria and Niger. Tunisia played the opening match on 18 January 2016 against Guinea. The match ended in a 2–2 draw. Ahmed Akaïchi scored two goals in the 33rd and 50th minutes, while Alsény Camara also scored two goals in the 40th and 87th minutes. Tunisia also drew 1–1 against Nigeria in the second match. The opponents took the lead in the 52nd minute with a goal by Chisom Chikatara, while Tunisia equalized with a goal by Akaïchi in the 69th minute. In the third match against Niger, Tunisia achieved a big victory with a score of 5–0. Saad Bguir scored two goals in the 5th and 39th minutes, Akaïchi added the third goal in the 78th, Mohamed Amine Ben Amor scored the fourth goal in the 80th, and Hichem Essifi concluded the five goals in the 90+1 minute, to qualify for the quarter-finals in the top of the group with two draws and a win. In the quarter-finals, Tunisia faced Mali.The team took the lead through Mohamed Ali Moncer in the 14th minute, however Mali turned the game around with goals from Aliou Dieng from the penalty spot in the 70th minute and Abdoulaye Diarra adding the second ten minutes later to eliminate Tunisia from the competition after the 1–2 defeat.

==== Group stage ====
Pos	Team	Pld	W	D	L	GF	GA	GD	Pts	Qualification
1	Tunisia	3	1	2	0	8	3	+5	5	Advance to knockout stage
2	Guinea	3	1	2	0	5	4	+1	5	Advance to knockout stage
3	Nigeria	3	1	1	1	5	3	+2	4	
4	Niger	3	0	1	2	3	11	−8	1	

18 January 2016
15:00

Tunisia	2–2	Guinea
Akaïchi 33', 50'	Report	Al. Camara 40', 87'

Stade Régional Nyamirambo, Kigali
Referee: Daniel Bennett (South Africa)

22 January 2016
15:00

Tunisia	1–1	Nigeria
Akaïchi 69'	Report	Chikatara 52'

Stade Régional Nyamirambo, Kigali
Referee: Joshua Bondo (Botswana)

26 January 2016
16:00

Niger	0–5	Tunisia
	Report	Bguir 5', 39'; Akaïchi 78'; Ben Amor 80'; Essifi 90+1'

Stade Régional Nyamirambo, Kigali
Referee: Bamlak Tessema Weyasa (Ethiopia)

==== Quarter-finals ====
31 January 2016
15:00

Tunisia	1–2	Mali
Moncer 14'	Report	Dieng 70' (pen.); Diarra 80'

Stade Régional Nyamirambo, Kigali
Referee: Hamada Nampiandraza (Madagascar)

== Statistics ==
=== Head to head ===
- – Positive balance
- – Neutral balance
- – Negative balance

Versus	Pld	W	D	L	GF	GA	Def	First match date	Last match date
Algeria	1	0	1	0	1	1	0	22 February 2011	22 February 2011
Angola	2	1	1	0	4	1	+3	7 February 2011	25 February 2011
DR Congo	1	1	0	0	1	0	+1	19 February 2011	19 February 2011
Guinea	1	0	1	0	2	2	0	18 January 2016	18 January 2016
Mali	1	0	0	1	1	2	–1	31 January 2016	31 January 2016
Niger	1	1	0	0	5	0	+5	26 January 2016	26 January 2016
Nigeria	1	0	1	0	1	1	0	22 January 2016	22 January 2016
Rwanda	1	1	0	0	3	1	+2	11 February 2011	11 February 2011
Senegal	1	1	0	0	2	0	+2	15 February 2011	15 February 2011
Total	10	5	4	1	20	8	+16	7 February 2011	31 January 2016

=== Goalscorers ===
Rank	Player	2011	2016	Goals
1	Ahmed Akaïchi		4	4
2	Salema Gasdaoui	3		3
2	Zouheir Dhaouadi	3		3
3	Oussama Darragi	2		2
3	Saad Bguir		2	2
4	Khaled Korbi	1		1
4	Youssef Msakni	1		1
4	Mejdi Traoui	1		1
4	Mohamed Ben Amor		1	1
4	Hichem Essifi		1	1
4	Mohamed Ali Moncer		1	1
Total		11	9	20

– Best goalscorer(s) of the tournament
– Best goalscorer(s) of the team

== Awards ==
Top scorer

- 2011: Zouheir Dhaouadi (3 goals)
- 2011: Salema Gasdaoui (3 goals)
- 2016: Ahmed Akaïchi (4 goals)

Best player

- 2011: Zouheir Dhaouadi

Team of the Tournament

- 2016: Ahmed Akaïchi

== Kits ==
2011 African Nations Championship		2016 African Nations Championship	
Home	Away	Home	Away

== See also ==
- Tunisia at the FIFA World Cup
- Tunisia at the FIFA Confederations Cup
- Tunisia at the Africa Cup of Nations
- Tunisia at the FIFA Arab Cup
