= Tunisia A' national football team =

National team for in-Tunisia players

Tunisia A'
- Nickname(s): نسور قرطاج (Eagles of Carthage)
- Association: Tunisian Football Federation
- Confederation: CAF (Africa)
- Sub-confederation: UNAF (North Africa)
- Captain: Ghailene Chaalali
- Top scorer: Ahmed Akaichi; Saad Bguir (4)
- Home stadium: Hammadi Agrebi Stadium
- FIFA code: TUN
First colours	Second colours	Third colours

First international
- Tunisia 1–1 Libya (Tripoli, Libya; 30 March 2008)

Biggest win
- Niger 0–5 Tunisia (Kigali, Rwanda; 26 January 2016)

Biggest defeat
- Egypt 3–0 Tunisia (Ismailia, Egypt; 9 September 2025)

African Nations Championship
- Appearances: 2 (first in 2011)
- Best result: Champions (2011)
Medal record
Men's Football
African Nations Championship
Gold medal – first place	2011 Sudan	Team

The Tunisia A' national football team has represented Tunisia in men's international association football for local players. The team is administered by the Tunisian Football Federation (TFF), which governs football in Tunisia. On a continental level, the team competes under the Confederation of African Football (CAF), which governs associate football in Africa, and is also affiliated with FIFA for global competitions. Additionally, the team is a member of the Union of North African Football (UNAF) and the Union of Arab Football Associations (UAFA). The team is colloquially known as Eagles of Carthage by fans and the media, with the bald eagle serving as its symbol. Their home kit is primarily white and their away kit is red, which is a reference to the national flag of the country.

Tunisia played its first match on 30 March 2008 against Libya in Tripoli during the 2009 African Nations Championship qualification which ended in a 1–1 draw in the first leg. The team failed to qualify for the inaugural edition in 2009 after being eliminated by Libya on penalties in the second leg. In 2010, the team played against Morocco at the 2011 African Nations Championship qualification. The team qualified for the African Nations Championship for the first time after a 1–1 draw in the first leg and a 2–2 draw in the second leg. In the finals in Sudan, Tunisia won the title in their first participation after presenting strong performances throughout the tournament and defeating Angola 3–0 in the final.

As the title holder, the team failed to qualify for the 2014 edition after losing to Morocco 0–1 on aggregate in the two qualifying matches. In 2015, Tunisia enter the 2016 African Nations Championship qualification. The qualifying system came through a group of three teams, in addition to Libya and Morocco. The team qualified for the finals by finishing second in the group after one win, one draw and two losses. In the finals, after topping the group with two draws and a resounding 5–0 victory over Niger, the team was eliminated in the quarter-finals after a surprising 2–1 defeat to Mali. Tunisia did not enter the 2018 African Nations Championship qualification due to the senior team's preparations and participation in the 2018 FIFA World Cup.

The team qualified for the 2020 edition after defeating Libya 1–0 and 2–1 in the two-legged qualifiers. However, they withdrew from the tournament due to scheduling constraints and the COVID-19 pandemic. This withdrawal resulted in the Tunisian Football Federation being fined $50,000 by CAF and banned from participating in the 2022 edition. On 9 October 2024, during the draw for the 2024 African Nations Championship qualification, CAF has allocated three places for the North African region, however Algeria and Egypt have declined to participate, it was decided that Libya, Morocco and Tunisia would automatically qualify for the final tournament. However, on 9 November Tunisia withdrew again from participation after meeting with representatives of Tunisian league clubs due to the pressure of the calendar.

== History ==
=== 2008: Beginnings ===
In March 2008, Tunisia entered the 2009 African Nations Championship qualification, competing with an under-23 team. The team played a home-and-away match against Libya. On 30 March, Tunisia played its first match in Tripoli, which ended in a 1–1 draw with Youssef Mouihbi scoring the opening goal in the 48nd minute. The second leg was played on 13 April in Tunis and ended in a 1–1 draw, with Houcine Jaber scoring Tunisia's goal in the 62nd minute. However, Libya qualified for the next round after winning on penalties 5–6.

=== 2010–2011: First CHAN appearance, African Champions ===
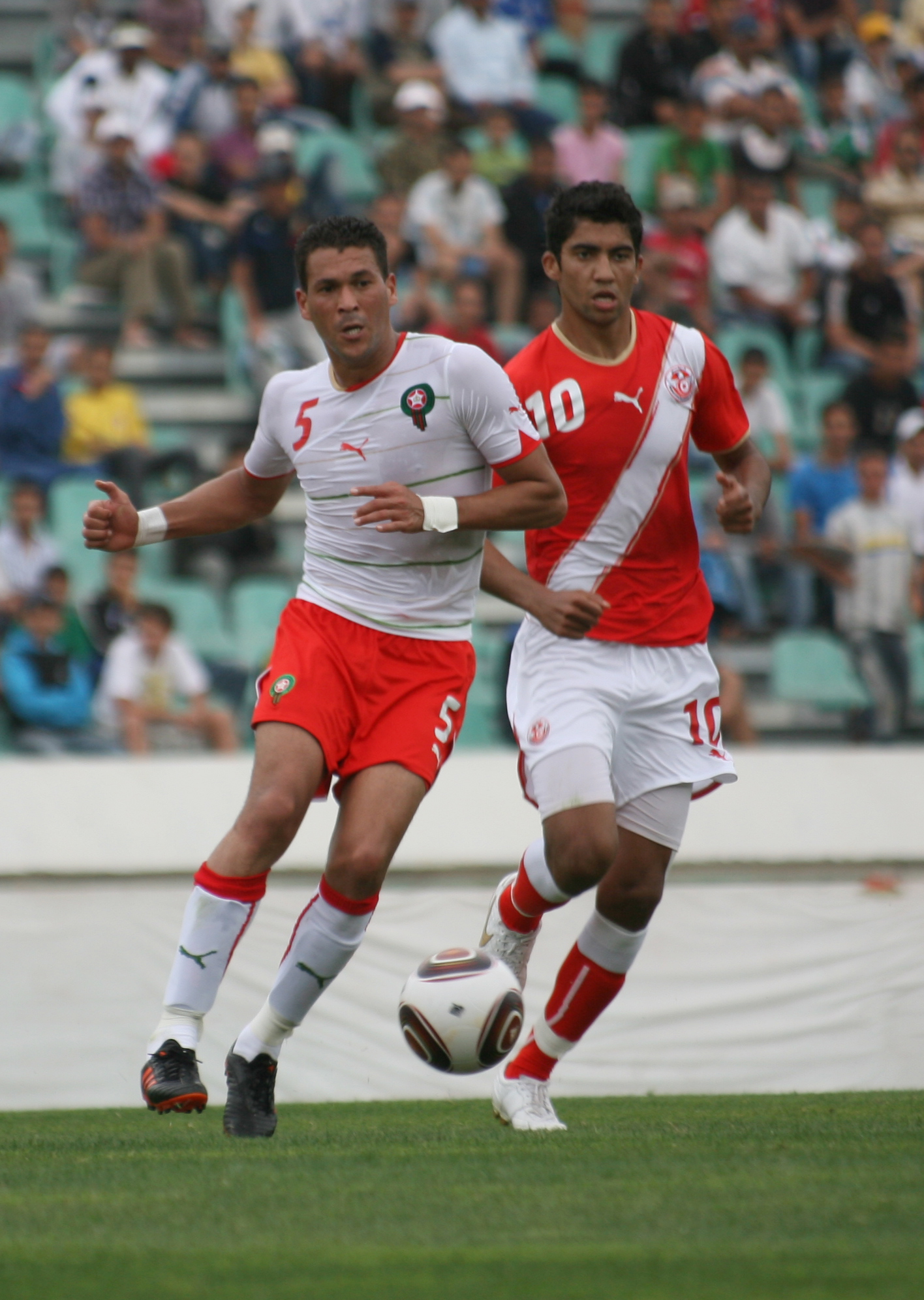
Tunisia against Morocco for the 2011 African Nations Championship qualification against at the Stade Mohammed V in Casablanca.

In 2010, under new coach Sami Trabelsi, Tunisia entered the 2011 African Nations Championship qualification, facing Morocco home and away. The first leg was played on 23 May at the Stade Olympique de Sousse in Sousse and ended in a 1–1 draw with Ammar Jemal scoring for Tunisia from a penalty kick in the 62nd minute. The second leg was played on 5 June at Stade Mohammed V in Casablanca and ended in a 2–2 draw. After trailing 0–1, Saber Khalifa scored in the 75th minute and Mehdi Meriah scored from a penalty kick in the 83rd minute. Morocco leveled the score with a goal from Rachid Soulaimani in the 85th minute. The match ended in a 2–2 draw, and Tunisia qualified for the African Nations Championship for the first time in its history thanks to away goals rule. The draw for the finals was held on 27 November in Khartoum, with Tunisia placed in Group D alongside Angola, Rwanda and Senegal.

In early 2011, Tunisia experienced a revolution and the ignition of the Arab Spring, without preparation, the team has little chance of flying to Sudan. On 7 February, Tunisia played their first match at the Port Sudan Stadium against Angola, which ended in a 1–1 draw, with Youssef Msakni scoring Tunisia's first goal in the finals. Four days later, the team achieved its first chan victory against Rwanda 3–1 with goals from Oussama Darragi, Salema Kasdaoui and Zouheir Dhaouadi. The team achieved another victory against Senegal, with a score of 2–0, with goals from Kasdaoui and Khaled Korbi, to qualify for the quarter-finals. In the quarter-finals, Tunisia faced the DR Congo, the previous edition's champions. The team managed to win, with a goal by Dhawadi's in the 50th minute. In the semi-final witnessed a strong confrontation during the Maghreb derby between Tunisia and Algeria. Kasdaoui scored Tunisia's first goal after a cross from Dhaouadi in the 18th minute, during his celebration of the goal, he took out a paper and addressed it to the camera, on which was written in arabic "Tunisia is free". While Abdelmoumene Djabou scored the equaliser for Algeria with a shot from outside the area that Aymen Mathlouthi was unable to stop. The regular and extra time ended in a 1–1 draw, with Tunisia winning on penalties 5–3, with Rami Jridi stopping Hocine Metref's kick with his fist. Tunisia qualified for the final match to face Angola.

In the final, Angola started off well, piling feverish pressure on the Eagles of Carthage through the right flank but lacked of polish with their finishing. Tunisia nearly scored in the 13th minutes but the Palancas Negras man between the woodworks Lamá made a point blank save. Three minutes after, Dhaouadi came close to scoring, but the Angolan goalkeeper anticipated well to block it from his post. Mejdi Traoui's powerful drive in the 20th minutes was punched aside by Lama who was well positioned to deny the Eagles their first goal. Adel Chedli sent the Carthage fans on their foot at the Al-Merrikh Stadium in the 37th minutes, but he missed the post by an inch. Their one-two-one-two upfront kept mesmerizing the Angolan guardsmen but their finishing were poorly executed. The north Africans returned from the interval determined. Two minutes into the second half Traoui in the ball from waist level with a right foot from Dhaouadi's cross from the left flank. Tunisia’s onslaughts began paying off from the 74th minute when Zouhaier doubled their lead with a left foot roll of the ball that went past Lamá straight into the woodwork. As the game wore on substitute Darragi put the final nail on the coffin in the 80th minutes to give the north Africans the ultimate. Dhaouadi and Kasdaoui finished the tournament as top scorers with 3 goals, and Dhaouadi was chosen as the best player. Tunisia became the first Arab country to win the African Nations Championship title, adding the title to the African Cup of Nations.

=== 2013–2016: Second CHAN appearance ===
In July 2013, placed under the direction of Nabil Maâloul, the team entered the 2014 African Nations Championship qualification, facing Morocco home and away. Tunisia were defeated 1–0 in Sousse and drew 0–0 in Tangier, failing to qualify for the finals. In 2015, the team entered the 2016 African Nations Championship qualification, through the North Zone group alongside Libya and Morocco under the direction of Henryk Kasperczak. The first and second days were played in June in Casablanca. Tunisia tied with Morocco 1–1, while it lost against Libya 0–1. The third and fourth days were played in October in Radès. The team won against Libya 1–0 and lost against Morocco 2–3. Tunisia qualified for the finals with a poor performance, finishing second in the group with a win, a draw and two defeats.

During the finals in Rwanda, Hatem Missaoui led the team. Tunisia was drawn in Group C alongside Guinea, Nigeria and Niger. Tunisia played the opening match on 18 January 2016 against Guinea. The match ended in a 2–2 draw. Ahmed Akaïchi scored two goals in the 33rd and 50th minutes, while Alsény Camara also scored two goals in the 40th and 87th minutes. Tunisia also drew 1–1 against Nigeria in the second match. The opponents took the lead in the 52nd minute with a goal by Chisom Chikatara, while Tunisia equalized with a goal by Akaïchi in the 69th minute. In the third match against Niger, Tunisia achieved a big victory with a score of 5–0. Saad Bguir scored two goals in the 5th and 39th minutes, Akaïchi added the third goal in the 78th, Mohamed Amine Ben Amor scored the fourth goal in the 80th, and Hichem Essifi concluded the five goals in the 90+1 minute, to qualify for the quarter-finals in the top of the group with two draws and a win. In the quarter-finals, Tunisia faced Mali.The team took the lead through Mohamed Ali Moncer in the 14th minute, however Mali turned the game around with goals from Aliou Dieng from the penalty spot in the 70th minute and Abdoulaye Diarra adding the second ten minutes later to eliminate Tunisia from the competition after the 1–2 defeat.

=== 2016–present: Withdrawals and total absence ===
On 22 September 2016, the Tunisian Football Federation announced that it would not enter the 2018 African Nations Championship qualification due to the 2018 FIFA World Cup qualification. In September 2019, underyhe lead of Mondher Kebaier, the team entered the 2020 African Nations Championship qualification, where they won home and away against Libya 1–0 in Radès and 2–1 in Salé due to the Libyan Civil War. However, on 20 December 2019, the Tunisian Football Federation withdrew from the tournament due to the intensity of the matches after the teams agreed. This led to the imposition of sanctions by the Confederation of African Football, fining the Tunisian Federation $50,000, in addition to banning the national team from participating in the next edition in Algeria. The team didn't enter to the 2022 African Nations Championship qualification.

On 9 October 2024, during the draw for the 2024 African Nations Championship qualification, the Confederation of African Football announced that three teams from Northern Zone would automatically qualify including Tunisia, after Egypt and previous hosts Algeria withdrawing. But the Tunisian Football Federation withdrew from the finals on 28 November due to the pressure of the calendar after consulting with the Tunisian League clubs. In September 2025, the team returned to action after six years through two friendly matches against Egypt in Ismailia, preparing the players who will participate in the 2025 FIFA Arab Cup. The team squad was announced on 30 August by the senior team coach Sami Trabelsi. However, coach Abdelhay Ben Soltane supervised the team, which lost both matches 0–1 and 0–3 after poor performance.

== Coaching history ==
- (Tunisia) Mondher Kebaier (2008)
- (Tunisia) Sami Trabelsi (2010–2013)
- (Tunisia) Nabil Maâloul (2013)
- (Poland) Henryk Kasperczak (2015)
- (Tunisia) Hatem Missaoui (2016)
- (Tunisia) Mondher Kebaier (2019) (2)
- (Tunisia) Abdelhay Ben Soltane (2025)

== Players ==
=== Current squad ===
The following players were called up for the friendly matches against Egypt on 6 and 9 September 2025 respectively.
Caps and goals correct as of 9 September 2025, after the match against Egypt.

No.	Pos.	Player	Date of birth (age)	Caps	Goals	Club
1	GK	Anas Khardani	2 January 2006 (age 20)	1	0	(Qatar Football Association) Muaither
16	GK	Sabri Ben Hassen	13 June 1996 (age 30)	1	0	(Tunisian Football Federation) Étoile du Sahel
22	GK	Abdessalem Hallaoui	28 March 1989 (age 37)	1	0	(Tunisian Football Federation) US Monastir
2	DF	Mohamed Nasraoui	18 August 2002 (age 24)	2	0	(Croatian Football Federation) NK Istra 1961
3	DF	Raed Chikhaoui	9 June 2004 (age 22)	1	0	(Tunisian Football Federation) US Monastir
5	DF	Adem Arous	17 July 2004 (age 22)	0	0	(Turkish Football Federation) Kasımpaşa
6	DF	Anis Doubal	29 October 2006 (age 19)	1	0	(French Football Federation) Marseille
12	DF	Hamza Ben Abda	14 March 1995 (age 31)	1	0	(Tunisian Football Federation) Club Africain
17	DF	Ghaith Zaalouni	6 May 2002 (age 24)	2	0	(Tunisian Football Federation) Club Africain
20	DF	Mohamed Dräger	25 June 1996 (age 30)	40	3	(German Football Association) Eintracht Braunschweig
21	DF	Amin Cherni	7 July 2001 (age 25)	4	0	(Turkish Football Federation) Göztepe
8	MF	Chiheb Jebali	26 May 1996 (age 30)	2	0	(Tunisian Football Federation) Espérance de Tunis
11	MF	Moataz Zemzemi	7 August 1999 (age 27)	3	0	(Tunisian Football Federation) Club Africain
15	MF	Moez Haj Ali	9 August 1999 (age 27)	3	0	(Tunisian Football Federation) US Monastir
23	MF	Ahmed Ouled Behi	19 August 2000 (age 26)	0	0	(Tunisian Football Federation) ES Métlaoui
25	MF	Ghailene Chaalali (captain)	28 February 1994 (age 32)	34	1	(Libyan Football Federation) Al Ahli Tripoli
7	FW	Khalil Ayari	2 February 2005 (age 21)	2	0	(French Football Federation) Paris Saint-Germain
9	FW	Achref Jabri	16 December 2001 (age 24)	2	0	(Tunisian Football Federation) Espérance de Tunis
10	MF	Aymen Harzi	1 March 1995 (age 31)	2	0	(Tunisian Football Federation) US Monastir
13	MF	Zayon Chtaï-Telamio	14 October 2006 (age 20)	2	0	(French Football Federation) Paris Saint-Germain
23	FW	Farès Bousnina	13 February 2006 (age 20)	1	0	(French Football Federation) Nice
18	FW	Nacim Dendani	30 April 2006 (age 20)	1	0	(French Football Federation) Monaco
19	FW	Anas Haj Mohamed	26 March 2005 (age 21)	4	0	(Italian Football Federation) Parma

== Competition records ==
=== African Nations Championship ===
African Nations Championship record										African Nations Championship qualification record						
Year	Round	Position	Pld	W	D*	L	GF	GA	Squad	Pld	W	D	L	GF	GA	Ref.
(Ivory Coast) 2009	Did not qualify									2	0	2	0	2	2	
(Sudan) 2011	Champions	1st	6	4	2	0	11	3	Squad	2	0	2	0	3	3	
(South Africa) 2014	Did not qualify									2	0	1	1	0	1	
(Rwanda) 2016	Quarter-finals	8th	4	1	2	1	9	5	Squad	4	1	1	2	4	5	
(Morocco) 2018	Did not enter									Did not enter						
(Cameroon) 2020	Withdrew after qualifying (Note: Tunisia qualified against Libya after winning two matches in the qualifiers, back 1–0 and 1–2, and due to the delay in the start of the session from January to April, the candidacy was withdrawn from the Tunisian Football Federation on 20 December 2019 due to the pressure of the calendar after consulting with the Tunisian Ligue Professionnelle 1 clubs.)									2	2	0	0	3	1	
(Algeria) 2022	Did not enter									Did not enter						
(Kenya) (Tanzania) (Uganda) 2024	Withdrew after qualifying (Note: After the team was automatically qualified by the Confederation of African Football on 9 October 2024, the Tunisian Football Federation withdrew from the finals on 28 November due to the pressure of the calendar after consulting with the Tunisian Ligue Professionnelle 1 clubs.)									Qualified automatically (Note: The Confederation of African Football has allocated three places for the North African region, however Algeria and Egypt have declined to participate. On 9 October 2024, during the draw for the 2024 African Nations Championship qualification, it was decided that Libya, Morocco and Tunisia would automatically qualify for the final tournament.)						
Total	Champions	2/8	10	5	4	1	20	8	—	12	3	6	3	12	12	—

== Head-to-head record ==
The list shown below shows the Tunisia national football team all−time international record against opposing nations.

Key

Positive balance (more wins than losses)
Neutral balance (as many wins as losses)
Negative balance (more losses than wins)

Tunisia national football team head-to-head records
Against	Pld	W	D	L	GF	GA	GD	Confederation
Algeria	1	0	1	0	1	1	0	CAF
Angola	2	1	1	0	4	1	+3	CAF
DR Congo	1	1	0	0	1	0	+1	CAF
Egypt	1	0	0	2	0	4	–4	CAF
Guinea	1	0	1	0	2	2	0	CAF
Libya	6	3	2	1	6	4	+2	CAF
Mali	1	0	0	1	1	2	–1	CAF
Morocco	6	0	4	2	6	8	–2	CAF
Niger	1	1	0	0	5	0	+5	CAF
Nigeria	1	0	1	0	1	1	0	CAF
Rwanda	1	1	0	0	3	1	+2	CAF
Senegal	1	1	0	0	2	0	+2	CAF
Total	24	8	10	6	32	24	+8	—
Last match updated was against Egypt on 9 September 2025.

== Honours ==
- African Nations Championship
  - Champions (1): 2011

== See also ==
- Tunisia national football team
- Tunisia national under-23 football team
- Tunisia national under-20 football team
- Tunisia national under-18 football team
- Tunisia national under-17 football team
- Tunisia national under-15 football team
