= 2011 African Nations Championship final =

- Event: 2011 African Nations Championship
Tunisia	Angola
(Tunisia)	(Angola)
3	0
- Date: 25 February 2011
- Venue: Al-Merrikh Stadium, Omdurman
- Referee: Daniel Bennett
- Attendance: + 43,000

The 2011 African Nations Championship final was a football match to determine the champions of the CHAN 2011 tournament and took place on 25 February 2011 the match was contested by Tunisia and Angola. Tunisia defeated Angola by 3–0, Tunisia winning their first title. Before this match the two teams met in the group stages and it finished 1–1.

== Background ==
Angola defeated hosts and Sudan on penalties after a stormy 1–1 draw and secured a place in the final against Tunisia. Tunisia also needed a shootout after a 1–1 deadlock following extra time before eliminating neighbours Algeria and reaching final. Angola won 4–2 on penalties and Tunisia 5–3 to set up a repeat of a Group D clash in Port Sudan which was drawn when the southern Africa nation scored deep in stoppage time.

== Route to the final ==
Tunisia
Round
Angola
Opponents
Result
Group stage
Opponents
Result
Angola
1–1
Match 1
Tunisia
1–1
Rwanda
3–1
Match 2
Senegal
0–0
Senegal
0–2
Match 3
Rwanda
1–2
Group D winner

Pos	Team	Pld	Pts
1	Tunisia	3	7
2	Angola	3	5
3	Senegal	3	4
4	Rwanda	3	0

Source: CAF
Final standings
Group D Runner-up

Pos	Team	Pld	Pts
1	Tunisia	3	7
2	Angola	3	5
3	Senegal	3	4
4	Rwanda	3	0

Source: CAF
Opponents
Result
Knockout stage
Opponents
Result
DR Congo
1–0
Quarter-finals
Cameroon
0–0 (a.e.t.) (7–8 p)
Algeria
1–1 (a.e.t.) (3–5 p)
Semi-finals
Sudan
1–1 (a.e.t.) (2–4 p)

== Match details ==
=== Summary ===
Angola started off well piling feverish pressure on the Eagles of Carthage through the right flank but lacked a lot of polish with their finishing. Both teams raised the adrenalin levels of their fans with Tunisia coming close to scoring in the 13th minutes but the Palancas Negras man between the woodworks Lamá made a point blank save. Three minutes after, Zouheir Dhaouadi came close to scoring but the Angolan goalkeeper anticipated well to block it from his post.

Mejdi Traoui's powerful drive in the 20th minutes was punched aside by Lama who was well positioned to deny the Eagles their first goal. Adel Chedli sent the Carthage fans on their foot at the Al-Merrikh Stadium in the 37th minutes but he missed the post by an inch. Their one-two-one-two upfront kept mesmerizing the Angolan guardsmen but their finishing were poorly executed.

The dingdong battle continued into the interval. The north Africans returned from the interval much determined. They set the stadium alive two minutes into the second half when Traoui Mejdi Traoui in the ball from waist level with a perfect right foot from Dhaouadi's cross from the left flank.

Tunisia's onslaughts began paying off from the 74th minute when Zouhaier doubled their lead with a fine left foot roll of the ball that went past Lamá straight into the woodwork. As the game wears on substitute Oussama Darragi put the final nail on the coffin in the 80th minutes to gift the north Africans the ultimate.

=== Details ===
25 February 2011
20:30

Tunisia	3–0	Angola
Traoui 47'; Dhaouadi 74'; Darragi 80'	Report

Al-Merrikh Stadium, Omdurman
Attendance: 40 000
Referee: Daniel Bennett (South Africa)

Tunisia	Angola

Tunisia:
GK	16	Aymen Mathlouthi
DF	2	Khaled Souissi
DF	3	Walid Hichri
DF	5	Aymen Abdennour
DF	6	Fateh Gharbi	(yellow card) 60'
MF	7	Youssef Msakni		(substituted off) 85'
MF	8	Khaled Korbi	(yellow card) 45'
MF	12	Adel Chedli	(yellow card) 31'	(substituted off) 77'
MF	14	Mejdi Traoui
FW	11	Salema Kasdaoui
FW	15	Zouheir Dhaouadi	(yellow card) 36'	(substituted off) 89'
Substitutes:
MF	10	Oussama Darragi		(substituted in) 77'
MF	13	Wissem Ben Yahia		(substituted in) 85'
FW	9	Lamjed Chehoudi		(substituted in) 89'
Manager:
Sami Trabelsi

Angola:
GK	1	Lamá
DF	3	Osório Carvalho
DF	5	Kali
DF	14	Amaro
DF	19	Fabrício Mafuta
MF	8	Chara
MF	13	Hugo	(substituted off) 57'
MF	15	Miguel Quiame	(substituted off) 76'
MF	20	Nary	(substituted off) 83'
FW	10	Santana Carlos
FW	23	João Martins
Substitutes:
MF	7	Job	(substituted in) 83'
FW	17	Zé Kalanga	(substituted in) 57'
FW	18	Love	(substituted in) 76'
Manager:
Lito Vidigal

Assistant referees:
Jason Damoo (Seychelles)
Angesom Ogbamariam (Eritrea)
Fourth official:
Mohamed Ragab (Libya)
