= Algeria A' national football team =

National team for in-Algeria players

Algeria A'
- Nickname(s): الأفنــاك (Fennec foxes)
- Association: Algerian Football Federation
- Confederation: CAF (Africa)
- Head coach: Vacant
- Captain: Ayoub Ghezala
- Most caps: Zakaria Draoui (25)
- Top scorer: Aymen Mahious (9)
- Home stadium: Nelson Mandela Stadium; Miloud Hadefi Stadium
- FIFA code: ALG
First colours	Second colours

First international
- Algeria 1–1 Morocco (Koléa, Algeria; 3 May 2008)

Biggest win
- Algeria 5–0 Niger (Oran, Algeria; 31 January 2023)

Biggest defeat
- Morocco 3–0 Algeria (Berkane, Morocco; 19 October 2019)

African Nations Championship
- Appearances: 3 (first in 2011)
- Best result: 2nd (2022)

The Algeria A' national football team (Arabic: منتخب الجزائر لكرة القدم للمحليين) is the local national football team of Algeria and is open only to domestic league players. The team represents Algeria at the African Nations Championship and is controlled by the Algerian Football Federation.

The primary men's Algeria national football team contains expatriate players and represents Algeria at the Africa Cup of Nations.

== African Nations Championship record ==
African Nations Championship record
Year	Round	Position	Pld	W	D	L	GF	GA
(Ivory Coast) 2009	did not qualify							
(Sudan) 2011	Fourth place	4th	6	2	3	1	7	4
(South Africa) 2014	did not enter							
(Rwanda) 2016	Disqualified ^{1}							
(Morocco) 2018	did not qualify							
(Cameroon) 2020	did not qualify							
(Algeria) 2022	Runners-up	2nd	6	5	1	0	9	0
(Kenya) (Tanzania) (Uganda) 2024	Quarter-final	7th	5	1	4	0	6	3
Total	Runners-up	3/7	17	8	8	1	22	7

^1 The CAF disqualified Algeria from the CHAN 2016 because the team abandoned the qualifiers of the previous edition, the CHAN 2014.

== Coaching staff ==
=== Managerial history ===
Year	Name	Record (W–D–L)
2008	(Algeria) Mustapha Heddane	0–2–0
2009–2011	(Algeria) Abdelhak Benchikha	6–3–1
2010	(Algeria) Mohamed Chaïb*	1–1–0
2011–2012	(Algeria) Ali Fergani	2-0-1
2017	(Spain) Lucas Alcaraz	0–1–1
2017–2018	(Algeria) Rabah Madjer	1–0–1
2019	(France) Ludovic Batelli	0–1–1
2020–2025	(Algeria) Madjid Bougherra	26–15–2

- Chaib was in charge of a pair of friendlies against Mali since Benchikha was on duty with the A national team

== Players ==
=== Current squad ===
- The following players were called up for the CHAN qualifiers match against Gambia.
- Match dates: May 3, 2025 and May 9, 2025
- Opposition: (The Gambia) Gambia
- Caps and goals correct as of: 3 May 2025

No.	Pos.	Player	Date of birth (age)	Caps	Goals	Club
16	GK	Oussama Benbot	11 October 1994 (age 31)	6	0	(Algerian Football Federation) USM Alger
23	GK	Zakaria Bouhalfaya	11 August 1997 (age 29)	0	0	(Algerian Football Federation) CS Constantine
	GK	Abderrahmane Medjadel	1 July 1998 (age 28)	2	0	(Algerian Football Federation) ASO Chlef
	GK	Tarek Bousseder	28 November 2000 (age 25)	0	0	(Algerian Football Federation) ES Sétif
2	DF	Chouaib Keddad	25 July 1994 (age 32)	19	1	(Algerian Football Federation) CR Belouizdad
12	DF	Réda Halaïmia	28 August 1996 (age 30)	1	0	(Algerian Football Federation) MC Alger
13	DF	Bilal Boukerchaoui	15 February 2003 (age 23)	1	0	(Algerian Football Federation) CR Belouizdad
15	DF	Ilyes Chetti	22 January 1995 (age 31)	1	0	(Algerian Football Federation) USM Alger
19	DF	Ayoub Ghezala	6 December 1995 (age 30)	10	0	(Algerian Football Federation) MC Alger
20	DF	Mohamed Amine Madani (captain)	20 March 1993 (age 33)	3	0	(Algerian Football Federation) JS Kabylie
24	DF	Naoufel Khacef	27 October 1997 (age 28)	1	0	(Algerian Football Federation) CR Belouizdad
	DF	Imadeddine Azzi	21 June 1998 (age 28)	0	0	(Algerian Football Federation) USM Alger
	DF	Houari Baouche	24 December 1995 (age 30)	5	0	(Algerian Football Federation) CS Constantine
5	MF	Messala Merbah	22 July 1994 (age 32)	1	0	(Algerian Football Federation) CS Constantine
8	MF	Zakaria Draoui	20 February 1994 (age 32)	18	0	(Algerian Football Federation) MC Alger
17	MF	Akram Bouras	23 February 2002 (age 24)	1	0	(Algerian Football Federation) MC Alger
21	MF	Larbi Tabti	23 April 1993 (age 33)	0	0	(Algerian Football Federation) MC Alger
	MF	Mohamed Benkhemassa	28 June 1993 (age 33)	0	0	(Algerian Football Federation) MC Alger
	MF	Brahim Dib	6 July 1993 (age 33)	0	0	(Algerian Football Federation) CS Constantine
	MF	Mehdi Boudjemaa	7 April 1998 (age 28)	0	0	(Algerian Football Federation) JS Kabylie
7	FW	Adil Boulbina	2 May 2003 (age 23)	4	0	(Algerian Football Federation) Paradou AC
18	FW	Aymen Mahious	15 September 1997 (age 29)	16	9	(Algerian Football Federation) CR Belouizdad
25	FW	Abdennour Belhocini	18 August 1996 (age 30)	1	0	(Algerian Football Federation) CS Constantine
	FW	Lahlou Akhrib	24 April 2005 (age 21)	0	0	(Algerian Football Federation) JS Kabylie
	FW	Redouane Berkane	7 July 2003 (age 23)	1	0	(Algerian Football Federation) JS Kabylie
	FW	Abderrahmane Meziane	7 March 1994 (age 32)	16	4	(Algerian Football Federation) CR Belouizdad

=== Recent call-ups ===
The following players have been called up to the Algeria squad at least once within the last 12 months.

Pos.	Player	Date of birth (age)	Caps	Goals	Club	Latest call-up
GK	Oussama Benbot	11 October 1994 (age 31)	0	0	(Algeria) USM Alger	v. Senegal, 17 December 2022
GK	Abderrahmane Medjadel	1 July 1998 (age 28)	1	0	(Algeria) Paradou AC	v. Togo, 10 April 2022
GK	Zakaria Saidi	5 August 1996 (age 30)	0	0	(Algeria) JS Saoura	v. Togo, 10 April 2022
DF	Mouad Hadded	22 February 1997 (age 29)	1	0	(Algeria) MC Alger	v. Togo, 10 April 2022
DF	Aimen Bouguerra	10 January 1997 (age 29)	1	0	(Algeria) Paradou AC	v. Togo, 10 April 2022
DF	Djamel Benlamri	25 December 1989 (age 36)	0	0	(Algeria) MC Alger	v. Togo, 10 April 2022
DF	Abdelmoumen Chikhi	29 February 1996 (age 30)	0	0	(Algeria) JS Kabylie	v. Togo, 10 April 2022
DF	Chemseddine Nessakh	4 January 1988 (age 38)	0	0	(Algeria) CR Belouizdad	v. Togo, 10 April 2022
DF	Merwane Khelif	8 February 2000 (age 26)	0	0	(Algeria) JS Saoura	v. Togo, 10 April 2022
MF	Djaber Kaassis	3 May 1999 (age 27)	0	0	(Algeria) Paradou AC	v. Togo, 10 April 2022
MF	Yacine Titraoui	26 July 2003 (age 23)	0	0	(Algeria) Paradou AC	v. Togo, 10 April 2022
MF	Khalid Dahamni	25 November 1999 (age 26)	0	0	(Algeria) ASO Chlef	v. Togo, 10 April 2022
FW	Adil Boulbina	2 May 2003 (age 23)	0	0	(Algeria) Paradou AC	v. Senegal, 17 December 2022
FW	Abderrahim Deghmoum	2 December 1998 (age 27)	1	0	(Algeria) ES Sétif	v. Togo, 10 April 2022
FW	Kheireddine Merzougui	16 August 1992 (age 34)	0	0	(Algeria) CR Belouizdad	v. Togo, 10 April 2022
FW	Samy Frioui	7 September 1991 (age 35)	0	0	(Algeria) MC Alger	v. Togo, 10 April 2022
FW	Rédha Bensayah	22 August 1994 (age 32)	0	0	(Algeria) JS Kabylie	v. Togo, 10 April 2022
FW	Nadhir Benbouali	17 April 2000 (age 26)	0	0	(Algeria) Paradou AC	v. Togo, 10 April 2022

== Results and fixtures ==
=== 2023 ===
7 January Friendly	Algeria A'	0–0	Ghana A'	Baraki, Algeria
17:00 UTC+1		Report	N'Sobila (yellow card) 79'	Stadium: Nelson Mandela Stadium; Referee: Nabil Boukhalfa (Algeria)
Note: Lineup for Algeria - Guendouz, Belkhither, Belaïd (Cap), Dehiri (Abdellaoui 64'), Laouafi, Chita (Merizeg 64'), Kendouci, Draoui (Djahnit 73'), Meziane, Lahmeri (Fath-Allah 73'), Bayazid (Aribi 46').

13 January 2023 2022 CHAN - group A	Algeria A'	1–0	Libya A'	Baraki, Algeria
				Stadium: Nelson Mandela Stadium

17 January 2023 2022 CHAN - group A	Algeria A'	1–0	Ethiopia A'	Baraki, Algeria
				Stadium: Nelson Mandela Stadium

21 January 2023 2022 CHAN - group A	Mozambique A'	0–1	Algeria A'	Baraki, Algeria
				Stadium: Nelson Mandela Stadium

27 January 2023 2022 CHAN - QF	Algeria A'	1–0	Ivory Coast A'	Baraki, Algeria
				Stadium: Nelson Mandela Stadium

31 January 2023 2022 CHAN - SF	Algeria A'	5–0	Niger A'	Bir El Djir, Algeria
17:00	Abdellaoui 15'; Mahious 24', 34'; Katakoré 45' (o.g.); Bayazid 83'			Stadium: Miloud Hadefi Stadium; Attendance: 39,000; Referee: Tom Abongile (South Africa)

4 February 2023 2022 CHAN - Final	Algeria A'	0–0 (4–5 p)	Senegal A'	Baraki, Algeria
20:30				Stadium: Nelson Mandela Stadium; Attendance: 39,120; Referee: Pierre Ghislain Atcho (Gabon)
	Penalties
	Djahnit (penalty scored); Draoui (penalty scored); Bayazid (penalty scored); Laouafi (penalty scored); Mahious (penalty missed); Kendouci (penalty missed)		(penalty scored) Baldé; (penalty scored) M. N'Diaye; (penalty scored) M. Kanté; (penalty missed) C. Ndiaye; (penalty scored) L. Camara; (penalty scored) O. Diouf

=== 2025 ===
3 May 2025 2024 CHANQ - 2nd stage (1st leg)	Gambia A'	0–0	Algeria A'	Bakau, Gambia
15:00 UTC+0		Report		Stadium: Independence Stadium; Referee: Mohamed Athoumani (Comoros)

9 May 2025 2024 CHANQ - 2nd stage (2nd leg)	Algeria A'	3–0	Gambia A'	Annaba, Algeria
20:30 UTC+1	Meziane 46'; Boulbina 71', 90+1'	Report		Stadium: 19 May 1956 Stadium; Referee: Ibrahim Traoré (Ivory Coast)
Note: Algeria won 3–0 on aggregate.

4 August 2025 2024 CHAN - group C	Uganda A'	0–3	Algeria A'	Kampala, Uganda
20:00		Report	Ghezala 36'; Meziane 76'; Bayazid 79'	Stadium: Mandela National Stadium; Referee: Adalbert Diouf (Senegal)

8 August 2025 2024 CHAN - group C	Algeria A'	1–1	South Africa A'	Kampala, Uganda
17:00	Belhocini 29'	Report	Kutumela 45'	Stadium: Mandela National Stadium; Referee: Clement Franklin Kpan (Ivory Coast)

15 August 2025 2024 CHAN - group C	Guinea A'	1–1	Algeria A'	Kampala, Uganda
17:00	Camara 62'	Report	Bayazid 88'	Stadium: Mandela National Stadium; Referee: Abdou Abdel Mefire (Cameroon)

18 August 2025 2024 CHAN - group C	Algeria A'	0–0	Niger A'	Nairobi, Kenya
20:00		Report		Stadium: Nyayo National Stadium; Referee: Ahmed Arajiga (Tanzania)

23 August 2025 2024 CHAN - QF	Sudan A'	1–1 (a.e.t.) (4–2 p)	Algeria A'	Zanzibar City, Tanzania
20:00	Ghezala 48' (o.g.)	Report	Bayazid 73'	Stadium: Amaan Stadium; Referee: Clement Franklin Kpan (Ivory Coast)
	Penalties
	Khidir (penalty scored); Ering (penalty scored); Yousif (penalty scored); Boshara (penalty missed); Asad (penalty scored)		Mahious (penalty scored); Bayazid (penalty scored); Merghem (penalty missed); Draoui (penalty missed)
Note: Sudan A' won on penalty free kick 4–2

9 October 2025 Friendly	Algeria A'	3–0	Palestine	Annaba, Algeria
20:30 UTC+1				Stadium: 19 May 1956 Stadium

13 October 2025 Friendly	Algeria A'	0–1	Palestine	Annaba, Algeria
18:00 UTC+1				Stadium: 19 May 1956 Stadium

14 November 2025 Friendly	Egypt A'	3–2	Algeria A'	Cairo, Egypt
16:00 UTC+3		Report		Stadium: Al Salam Stadium

17 November 2025 Friendly	Egypt A'	0–0	Algeria A'	Cairo, Egypt
18:00 UTC+3		Report		Stadium: Al Salam Stadium

== All-time record ==
Date	Location	Home team	Score	Away team	Occasion
May 3, 2008	Koléa	Algeria A'	1–1	Morocco A'	2009 African Championship of Nations qualification
May 17, 2008	Fes	Morocco A'	1–1 (3–1 p)	Algeria A'	2009 African Championship of Nations qualification
March 3, 2010	Koléa	Algeria A'	4–0	Liechtenstein	Friendly match
March 13, 2010	Koléa	Algeria A'	1–0	Libya A'	2011 African Nations Championship qualification
April 17, 2010	Tripoli	Libya A'	2–1	Algeria A'	2011 African Nations Championship qualification
October 8, 2010	Rouiba	Algeria A'	1–1	Mali A'	Friendly match
October 11, 2010	Rouiba	Algeria A'	1–0	Mali A'	Friendly match
December 28, 2010	Algiers	Algeria A'	3–1	Chad	Friendly match
January 22, 2011	Algiers	Algeria A'	4–1	Niger	Friendly match
February 5, 2011	Khartoum	Uganda A'	0–2	Algeria A'	2011 African Nations Championship
February 8, 2011	Khartoum	Gabon A'	2–2	Algeria A'	2011 African Nations Championship
February 12, 2011	Khartoum	Sudan A'	0–0	Algeria A'	2011 African Nations Championship
February 18, 2011	Khartoum	South Africa A'	0–2	Algeria A'	2011 African Nations Championship
February 22, 2011	Khartoum, Sudan	Algeria A'	1–1 (3–5 p)	Tunisia A'	2011 African Nations Championship
February 25, 2011	Omdurman, Sudan	Sudan A'	1–0	Algeria A'	2011 African Nations Championship
May 25, 2013	Blida, Algeria	Algeria A'	1–0	Mauritania	Friendly match
August 12, 2017	Constantine, Algeria	Algeria A'	1–2	Libya A'	2018 African Nations Championship qualification
August 18, 2017	Sfax, Tunisia	Libya A'	1–1	Algeria A'	2018 African Nations Championship qualification
January 10, 2018	Radès, Tunisia	Algeria A'	4–1	Liberia A'	Friendly match
May 9, 2018	Cadix, Spain	Saudi Arabia	2–0	Algeria A'	Friendly match
September 21, 2019	Blida, Algeria	Algeria A'	0–0	Morocco A'	2020 African Nations Championship qualification
October 19, 2019	Berkane, Morocco	Morocco A'	3–0	Algeria A'	2020 African Nations Championship qualification
June 17, 2021	Bir El Djir, Algeria	Algeria A'	5–1	Liberia	Friendly match
