= Shabangu =

Shabangu is a surname. Notable people with this surname include:

- Absalom Shabangu (born 1952), Swazi weightlifter
- Bheki Shabangu (born 1985), South African football player
- Brian Shabangu (born 2013), South African rugby union player
- Fisani Shabangu, South African politician
- Ka Shabangu (born 1954/55), South African politician and activist
- Mncedisi Shabangu (1969–2022), South African actor
- Paul Shabangu (born c. 1943), Swazi politician
- Susan Shabangu (born 1956), South African politician
- Victor Shabangu (1970–2018), Swazi long jumper
