= Papa Alioune Diouf =

Senegalese footballer

Papa Diouf
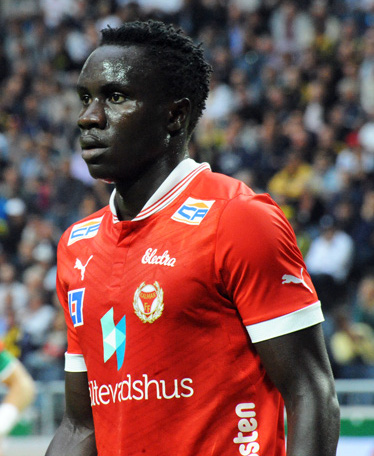
- Diouf in 2013

Personal information
- Full name: Papa Alioune Diouf
- Date of birth: 22 June 1989 (age 37)
- Place of birth: Dakar, Senegal
- Height: 1.81 m (5 ft 11 in)
- Positions: Forward; winger

Team information
- Current team: Oskarshamn
- Number: 77

Senior career*
| Years | Team | Apps | (Gls) |
| 2007–2008 | Touré Kunda | | |
| 2009–2011 | Dakar UC | | |
| 2011 | → Litex Lovech (loan) | 14 | (2) |
| 2012–2019 | Kalmar | 164 | (23) |
| 2019–2021 | İstanbulspor | 44 | (10) |
| 2021 | Boluspor | 13 | (0) |
| 2021–2022 | Ermis Aradippou | | |
| 2022 | Kalmar | 8 | (1) |
| 2022–2023 | Brindisi | 10 | (1) |
| 2023– | Oskarshamn | 15 | (7) |

International career^{‡}
| 2010–2012 | Senegal | 2 | (0) |
- * Club domestic league appearances and goals as of 13:50, 30 November 2023 (UTC) ‡ National team caps and goals as of 10 July 2019

Papa Alioune Diouf (born 22 June 1989) is a Senegalese professional footballer who plays as a forward or winger for Swedish club Oskarshamn. He made two appearances for the Senegal national team between 2010 and 2012.

== Club career ==
=== Early career ===
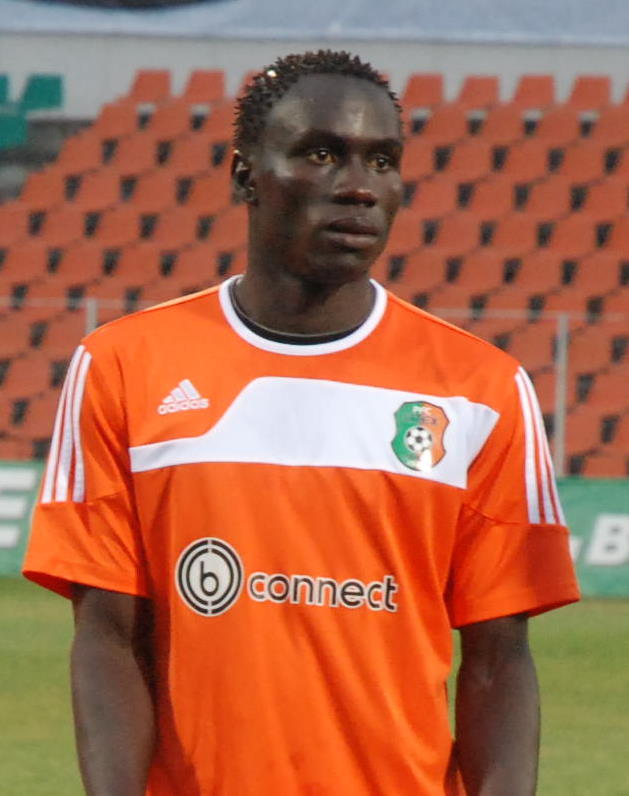
Diouf during his time with Litex Lovech.

Born in Dakar, Senegal, Papa Diouf started his career at Touré Kunda, before moved to Dakar Université Club in 2009.

On 20 February 2011, the Bulgarian Litex Lovech confirmed Diouf has joined on loan until the end of the season. He made his A PFG debut on 27 February, coming on as a 52nd-minute substitute for Dejan Djermanović in the 3–0 victory over Minyor Pernik; he then scored his first goal for the club 38 minutes later.

=== Kalmar FF ===
On 20 September 2011, Swedish club Kalmar FF confirmed that they had reached a deal with Dakar UC regarding Diouf, as of 1 January 2012 he would go on a six-month loan to Kalmar, together with Archford Gutu from Dynamos Harare, Zimbabwe. On 14 March Kalmar FF announced that they had decided to sign both Gutu and Diouf before Allsvenskan had started.

=== Return to Kalmar FF ===
On 21 June 2022, Diouf returned to Kalmar FF until the end of the 2022 season. After that, he played half a year for Serie D club SSD Brindisi FC before returning to Sweden and Kalmar's smaller neighboring club Oskarshamns AIK.

== International career ==
Diouf earned his first cap with the Senegal national team as a substitute in a friendly against the Mexico on 10 May 2010.

== Honours ==
Litex Lovech

- Bulgarian A PFG: 2010–11
