= Myron Shongwe =

South African soccer player

Personal information
- Date of birth: 6 May 1981 (age 45)
- Place of birth: Soweto, South Africa
- Position: Striker

Senior career*
Years	Team	Apps	(Gls)
- City Pillars
–2008	Black Leopards		
2008–2010	Amazulu		
2010–2011	Mpumalanga Black Aces	9	(0)
- Jomo Cosmos

International career
- South Africa Development XI
- * Club domestic league appearances and goals

Myron Shongwe (born 6 May 1981 in Soweto, Gauteng) is a South African football player who played as a striker, among others for MP Black Aces in the National First Division. He has represented the South Africa Development XI, playing for them at the 2011 African Championship of Nations.

Previous clubs include AmaZulu, Black Leopards, City Pillars
