= Archford Gutu =

Zimbabwean footballer (born 1993)

Personal information
- Full name: Archford Gutu
- Date of birth: 5 August 1993 (age 33)
- Place of birth: Harare, Zimbabwe
- Height: 1.78 m (5 ft 10 in)
- Position: Midfielder

Youth career
- Sprouting Academy
- 2007–2008: Caps FC

Senior career*
Years	Team	Apps	(Gls)
2009	Shooting Stars		
2009–2010	Ajax Cape Town	0	(0)
2010–2011	Dynamos Harare	21	(8)
2012–2015	Kalmar FF	27	(1)
2014–2015	→ IFK Värnamo (loan)	37	(2)
2016–2017	CAPS United	13	(1)
2017–2018	IFK Värnamo	17	(0)
2019–	Dynamos	15	(1)

International career^{‡}
	Zimbabwe U17	10	(7)
	Zimbabwe U20	9	(4)
	Zimbabwe U23	7	(2)
2009–2013	Zimbabwe	23	(2)
- * Club domestic league appearances and goals as of 31 December 2021 ‡ National team caps and goals as of 1 November 2020

Archford Gutu (born August 5, 1993) is a former Zimbabwean professional footballer who played as a midfielder for Dynamos F.C , Kalmar FF in Sweden and Zimbabwe National Team.

== Club career ==
=== Early career ===
Gutu joined South Africa's Ajax Cape Town in 2009 on a three-year deal, but failed to make a single appearance in the Premier Soccer League due to registration rules, because he was still a minor then. On September 1, 2010, he decided to terminate his contract with Ajax Cape Town FC .

=== Dynamos Harare ===
On September 25, 2010, Gutu returned to Zimbabwe and signed with Dynamos Harare. He made his first appearance for Dynamos on November 4, 2010, coming on as a substitute in a 1–0 win against Monomotapa United. Gutu scored his first goal for Dynamos FC on the 12th of December 2010, derby match against rivals Caps United in a BancABC Super8 Cup Final win and he was named man of the match. On February 28, 2011, he scored two goals in Dynamos' 3–2 victory over CAPS United in the Bob 87 Super Cup Final. On the 9th of June 2011 Dynamos comfortably defeated Black Mambas 4-1, Archford Gutu scored two early goals identical free kicks for Dynamos in the 6th and 25th minutes. Dynamos went on to win double: The 2011 League title and The Inaugural Mbada Diamonds Cup. During his stay at Dynamos, Gutu was one of the club's top players before signing for Kalmar FF in Sweden.

=== Kalmar FF ===
On September 20, 2011, Swedish club Kalmar FF confirmed that they had reached a deal with Dynamos Harare regarding Gutu, as of January 1, 2012, he would go on a six-month loan to Kalmar with Pape Diouf from Dakar UC, Senegal. On March 14, 2012, Kalmar FF announced that they had decided to purchase both Gutu and Diouf before Allsvenskan had started, on a four-year deal Archford Gutu is the first Zimbabwean professional footballer to play in Sweden. Archie made his first Europa League appearance on the 12th July 2012 against Cliftonville FC from Northern Ireland. Gutu's first Europa League goal came on the 19th of July 2012 against NK Osijek in Croatia, Kalmar ff won the 1st leg 3-1.

== International career ==
=== Youth teams ===
Gutu was capped by Zimbabwe at under-17, under-20, and under-23 levels. He was part of the team that won the 2007 COSAFA Under-20 Cup in South Africa, following which he flew to Namibia to join and captained the Zimbabwe Under-17 team that won the 2007 COSAFA Under-17 Cup. In 2007, Gutu was among the Young Sportsmen of the Year nominees which he came 3rd.

=== Senior team ===
Archford Gutu is currently the youngest Zimbabwe National Team player to ever make their debut, he made his debut at the age of 16. Gutu won the COSAFA Cup with the Zimbabwe National Team as hosts in the 2009 tournament. Gutu was part of the Zimbabwe National Team squad that played 2011 African Nations Championship in Sudan. He scored in the second game of the group stages to help Zimbabwe beat Ghana, 1–0. Gutu scored his 2nd International goal a header against Angola in African Cup Of Nations Qualifies game on 1st of September 2012 in Rufaro Stadium Harare.

=== International goals ===
#	Date	Venue	Opponent	Score	Result	Competition
1	9 February 2011	Wad Madani Stadium	Ghana	1–0	Win	2011 African Nations Championship
1	9 September 2012	National Sports Stadium (Zimbabwe)	Angola	3–1	Win	2013 Africa Cup of Nations qualification
