= João Martins (footballer, born 1982) =

Angolan/Portuguese footballer

Personal information
- Full name: João Pedro Pinto Martins
- Date of birth: 20 June 1982 (age 44)
- Place of birth: Lisbon, Portugal
- Height: 1.82 m (6 ft 0 in)
- Position: Forward

Youth career
- 1991–1992: Zambujalense
- 1994–1995: Zambujalense
- 1995–1996: Alverca
- 1997–1998: Vialonga
- 1998–2001: Alverca

Senior career*
Years	Team	Apps	(Gls)
2001–2004	Lourinhanense		
2004–2005	Alverca	10	(0)
2005–2006	Chaves	9	(0)
2006	Fátima	6	(3)
2006–2007	Tourizense	10	(1)
2007–2009	Sibir	54	(7)
2009	Ventspils	4	(3)
2010–2012	1º Agosto		
2013	Libolo	?	(1)
2014	Bravos Maquis	9	(1)
2016–2017	Hamm Benfica	11	(3)
2017–2018	Blo-Wäiss Medernach		
2018–2020	Mondorf-les-Bains	17	(6)
2021–2023	Hamm Benfica	34	(3)
Total		164+	(28)

International career
2011	Angola	2	(1)
Medal record
Men's football
Representing Angola
African Nations Championship
Runner-up	2011 Sudan
- * Club domestic league appearances and goals

João Pedro Pinto Martins (born 20 June 1982) is a former professional footballer who played as a forward.

Born in Portugal, he represented Angola at international level.

== Club career ==
Martins was born in Lisbon. During his career in Portugal, spent in no higher than the second division and with little impact, he represented S.C. Lourinhanense, F.C. Alverca, G.D. Chaves, C.D. Fátima and G.D. Tourizense. He first moved abroad in 2007, signing with Russia's FC Sibir Novosibirsk also at that level.

Martins then moved to nearby Latvia and joined FK Ventspils. However, after a few months, he was released from his contract and signed with C.D. Primeiro de Agosto; he continued playing in the land of his ancestors the following years, appearing for C.R.D. Libolo and F.C. Bravos do Maquis.

== Honours ==
Angola

- African Nations Championship runner-up: 2011
