= Bheki Shabangu =

South African soccer player

Personal information
- Full name: Bheki Leonard Shabangu
- Date of birth: 21 September 1985 (age 41)
- Place of birth: KwaThema, South Africa
- Position: Striker

Youth career
- African All Stars

Senior career*
Years	Team	Apps	(Gls)
2011–2012	Engen Santos	15	(2)
- * Club domestic league appearances and goals

Bheki Shabangu (born 21 September 1985) is a South African soccer player who played as a striker.

He has represented the South Africa Development XI, playing for them at the 2011 African Championship of Nations.
