= 2011 African Nations Championship qualification =

The qualification phase for the 2011 African Championship of Nations began in March 2010. These games did not count towards the FIFA rankings.

The inaugural edition of the competition featured eight teams, while this edition featured sixteen.

== Qualification Zones ==
Qualification was divided into the CAF Zoning system. Each Zone had either two or three teams that qualified for the final tournament.

Zone	Number of participating teams	Number of qualifying teams	Number of teams not entered
North Zone	4	2	1 (Egypt)
Zone West A	5	2	4 (Cape Verde, Gambia, Guinea-Bissau, Liberia)
Zone West B	6	3	1 (Benin)
Central Zone	5	3	3 (Central African, Chad, São Tomé & Príncipe)
Central-East Zone	10 (including host Sudan)	3 (including host Sudan)	0
Southern Zone	11	3	3 (Comoros, Lesotho, Mauritius)
Total	41	16	12

== North Zone ==
=== First round ===
Team 1	Agg.	Team 2	1st leg	2nd leg
Algeria	(a) 2–2	Libya	1–0	1–2
Tunisia	(a) 3–3	Morocco	1–1	2–2

13 March 2010

Algeria	1–0	Libya
Ghazali 48'	Report

Koléa
Attendance: 10,000
Referee: Bouchaib El Ahrach (Morocco)
18 April 2010

Libya	2–1	Algeria
Al Shibani 26' (pen.); Zuway 62'	Report	Hanitser 90'

June 11 Stadium, Tripoli

23 May 2010
17:00 UTC+1

Tunisia	1–1	Morocco
	Report

Stade Olympique de Sousse, Sousse
Referee: Mohamed Bichari (Algeria)
5 June 2010
17:00 UTC+1

Morocco	2–2	Tunisia
Erbati 32' (pen.); Soulaimani 85'	Report	Khalifa 75'; Meriah 83' (pen.)

Stade Mohamed V, Casablanca
Referee: Tamuni Salah Wahid (Libya)

Tunisia and Algeria qualify for the final tournament.

== Zone West A ==
=== Preliminary round ===
Team 1	Agg.	Team 2	1st leg	2nd leg
Mauritania	w/o	Sierra Leone		

Mauritania withdrew.

=== First round ===
Team 1	Agg.	Team 2	1st leg	2nd leg
Guinea	1–3	Mali	1–1	0–2
Senegal	1–1 (4–3p)	Sierra Leone	1–0	0–1

14 March 2010

Guinea	1–1	Mali

28 March 2010

Mali	2–0	Guinea

14 March 2010

Senegal	1–0	Sierra Leone

28 March 2010

Sierra Leone	1–0	Senegal
Penalties
	3–4

Mali and Senegal qualify for the final tournament.

== Zone West B ==
Team 1	Agg.	Team 2	1st leg	2nd leg
Togo	1–6	Ivory Coast	1–2	0–4
Burkina Faso	0–1	Ghana	0–0	0–1
Niger	2–0	Nigeria	2–0	0–0

28 March 2010

Togo	1–2	Ivory Coast

11 April 2010

Ivory Coast	4–0	Togo

13 March 2010

Burkina Faso	0–0	Ghana

28 March 2010

Ghana	1–0	Burkina Faso

13 March 2010

Niger	2–0	Nigeria

28 March 2010

Nigeria	0–0	Niger

Ivory Coast, Ghana and Niger qualify for the final tournament.

== Central Zone ==
=== Preliminary round ===
Team 1	Agg.	Team 2	1st leg	2nd leg
Congo (Republic of the Congo)	w/o	Equatorial Guinea		

Equatorial Guinea withdrew.

=== First round ===
Team 1	Agg.	Team 2	1st leg	2nd leg
Congo (Republic of the Congo)	1–4	Cameroon	1–1	0–3
Gabon	2–3	(Democratic Republic of the Congo) DR Congo	1–2	1–1

14 March 2010

Congo	1–1	Cameroon

27 March 2010

Cameroon	3–0	Congo

12 March 2010

Gabon	1–2	DR Congo

28 March 2010

DR Congo	1–1	Gabon

Cameroon and DR Congo qualify for the final tournament.

=== Second round ===
Team 1	Agg.	Team 2	1st leg	2nd leg
Gabon	3–0	(Republic of the Congo) Congo	3–0 *	w/o

23 May 2010

Gabon	3–0 *	Congo

5 June 2010

Congo	Cancelled	Gabon

- Congo withdrew. Match was awarded 3–0 to Gabon.

Gabon qualify for the final tournament.

== Central-East Zone ==
=== Preliminary round ===
Team 1	Agg.	Team 2	1st leg	2nd leg
Djibouti	0–1	Somalia	N/P	0–1

Somalia	Not Played	Djibouti

8 January 2010

Djibouti	0–1	Somalia
	Report	Yusuf Osman 73'

There was only one leg played due to Somalia being unable to host international fixtures.

=== First round ===
Team 1	Agg.	Team 2	1st leg	2nd leg
Burundi	1–5	Uganda	1–1	0–4
Ethiopia	w/o	Kenya	w/o	0–3 *
Eritrea	w/o	Rwanda	w/o	0–3 *
Somalia	0–6	Tanzania	N/P	0–6

14 March 2010

Burundi	1–1	Uganda

28 March 2010

Uganda	4–0	Burundi

14 March 2010

Ethiopia	Cancelled	Kenya

28 March 2010

Kenya	3–0 *	Ethiopia

- Ethiopia withdrew. Match was awarded 3–0 to Kenya.

14 March 2010

Eritrea	Cancelled	Rwanda

28 March 2010

Rwanda	3–0 *	Eritrea

- Eritrea withdrew. Match was awarded 3–0 to Rwanda.

14 March 2010

Somalia	Not Played	Tanzania

27 March 2010

Tanzania	6–0	Somalia

There was only one leg played due to Somalia being unable to host international fixtures.

=== Second round ===
The Tanzania vs Rwanda match was pushed forward to May 1 due to Rwanda’s hosting of the CECAFA Kagame Cup from 15–29 May.

Team 1	Agg.	Team 2	1st leg	2nd leg
Uganda	(a) 2–2	Kenya	1–0	1–2
Tanzania	1–2	Rwanda	1–1	0–1

22 May 2010

Uganda	1–0	Kenya

6 June 2010

Kenya	2–1	Uganda

1 May 2010

Tanzania	1–1	Rwanda

6 June 2010

Rwanda	1–0	Tanzania

Uganda and Rwanda qualify for the final tournament, along with host Sudan.

== Southern Zone ==
=== First round ===
Team 1	Agg.	Team 2	1st leg	2nd leg
Botswana	1–2	South Africa	0–0	1–2
Seychelles	2–1	Namibia	1–0	1–1
Madagascar	0–2	Angola	0–0	0–2
Swaziland (Eswatini)	1–5	Zimbabwe	1–2	0–3
Malawi	3–1	Mozambique	3–0	0–1

Zambia receive bye to Second Round.

13 March 2010

Botswana	0–0	South Africa

27 March 2010

South Africa	2–1	Botswana

13 March 2010

Seychelles	1–0	Namibia

28 March 2010

Namibia	1–1	Seychelles

14 March 2010

Madagascar	0–0	Angola

27 March 2010

Angola	2–0	Madagascar

14 March 2010

Swaziland	1–2	Zimbabwe

28 March 2010

Zimbabwe	3–0	Swaziland

13 March 2010

Malawi	3–0	Mozambique

27 March 2010

Mozambique	1–0	Malawi

=== Second round ===
Team 1	Agg.	Team 2	1st leg	2nd leg
South Africa	2–1	Zambia	1–0	1–1
Seychelles	2–6	Zimbabwe	2–4	0–2
Angola	3–1	Malawi	1–1	2–0

23 May 2010

South Africa	1–0	Zambia

5 June 2010

Zambia	1–1	South Africa

22 May 2010

Seychelles	2–4	Zimbabwe

6 June 2010

Zimbabwe	2–0	Seychelles

22 May 2010

Angola	1–1	Malawi
Santana 90'

Referee: Jean-Michel Moukoko
5 June 2010

Malawi	0–2	Angola

Angola, South Africa and Zimbabwe qualify for the final tournament.

== Qualified ==
- Sudan - Host (Central-East Zone)
- Algeria - North Zone
- Tunisia - North Zone
- Mali - Zone West A
- Senegal - Zone West A
- Ivory Coast - Zone West B
- Ghana - Zone West B
- Niger - Zone West B
- Cameroon - Central Zone
- DR Congo - Central Zone
- Gabon - Central Zone
- Uganda - Central-East Zone
- Rwanda - Central-East Zone
- Angola - Southern Zone
- South Africa - Southern Zone
- Zimbabwe - Southern Zone
