= Abdelhay Ben Soltane =

Tunisian football manager (born 1966)

Personal information
- Date of birth: 12 December 1966 (age 59)
- Place of birth: Tunisia

Team information
- Current team: Jordan (technical director)

Managerial career
- Years: Team
- 2013–2014: Tunisia U17
- 2014: AS Djerba
- 2021: CS Hammam-Lif
- 2021: Maghreb of Fez (assistant)
- 2021–2022: Maghreb of Fez
- 2024: Maghreb of Fez
- 2024: COD Meknès
- 2025: Tunisia U20

Abdelhay Ben Soltane (Arabic: عبد الحي بن سلطان; born 12 December 1966) is a Tunisian football manager who is currently the technical director of the Jordan national football team.

== Career ==
Ben Soltane obtained a UEFA Pro License and has been regarded to prefer the 4-2-3-1 formation. During the summer of 2013, he was appointed manager of the Tunisia national under-17 football team and managed the team at the 2013 FIFA U-17 World Cup, where he helped them reach the round of 16. The next year, he was appointed manager of Tunisian side AS Djerba.

In 2021, he was appointed manager of Tunisian side CS Hammam-Lif. The same year, he was appointed as assistant manager of Moroccan side Maghreb of Fez, before being appointed as the club's head coach. While managing them, he helped them achieve a fourth-place finish in the league during the 2021–22 season. Three years later, he was appointed manager of Moroccan side COD Meknès. On 16 April 2025, he was appointed as the coach of Tunisia national under-20 football team to oversee them during the 2025 U-20 Africa Cup of Nations.

On 31 December 2025, the Jordan Football Association announced that Ben Soltane was appointed as the technical director of the association, being responsible for all their national teams.
