= Hatem Missaoui =

Tunisian football manager

Personal information
- Date of birth: 15 November 1970 (age 55)

Managerial career
- Years: Team
- 2010: LPS Tozeur
- 2013–2014: Tunisia U23 (assistant)
- 2014–2017: Tunisia (assistant)
- Tunisia A'
- 2018: AS Gabès
- 2018–2019: ES Métlaoui
- 2019: CS Hammam-Lif
- 2023: Al-Entesar
- 2024: Al Sadaqa
- 2024: USM Khenchela
- 2025–2026: ES Mostaganem

Hatem Missaoui (born 15 November 1970) is a Tunisian football manager.
