= Hichem Essifi =

Tunisian footballer

Personal information
- Full name: Hichem Essifi
- Date of birth: 27 February 1987 (age 39)
- Place of birth: Sousse, Tunisia
- Height: 1.96 m (6 ft 5 in)
- Position: Center forward

Team information
- Current team: Stade Tunisien

Senior career*
Years	Team	Apps	(Gls)
2007–2010	Monastir	55	(10)
2010–2011	Club Africain	7	(0)
2011–2012	Olympique Béja	11	(2)
2012–2013	Bordj Bou Arréridj	20	(11)
2013–2014	Zarzis		
2014	Hilalien		
2015	Kairouan	28	(6)
2015–2017	Stade Gabèsien	50	(12)
2017–2018	Monastir	16	(5)
2018	→ Ohod (loan)	8	(5)
2018	Al-Ain	20	(8)
2019	Al-Faisaly	10	(11)
2019	Ohod	18	(2)
2020	Al-Wehdat		
2021	Al-Diriyah	9	(1)
2021	Al-Faisaly		
2021-	Stade Tunisien		

International career^{‡}
2008–	Tunisia	8	(3)
- * Club domestic league appearances and goals as of 27 April 2018 ‡ National team caps and goals as of 30 May 2018

Hichem Essifi (born 27 February 1987) is a professional Tunisian footballer who plays as a forward for Al-Diriyah. He has earned eight caps for his country, scoring three goals.

== International career ==
Essifi has been capped by Tunisia and scored 2 goals against Seychelles.

=== International goals ===
Scores and results list Tunisia's goal tally first.

No	Date	Venue	Opponent	Score	Result	Competition
1.	11 October 2008	Stade Olympique de Radès, Radès, Tunisia	Seychelles	1–0	5–0	2010 FIFA World Cup qualification
2.	11 October 2008	Stade Olympique de Radès, Radès, Tunisia	Seychelles	5–0	5–0	2010 FIFA World Cup qualification
3.	26 January 2016	Stade Régional Nyamirambo, Kigali, Rwanda	Niger	5–0	5–0	2016 African Nations Championship
