= Adel Chedli =

Tunisian footballer (born 1976)

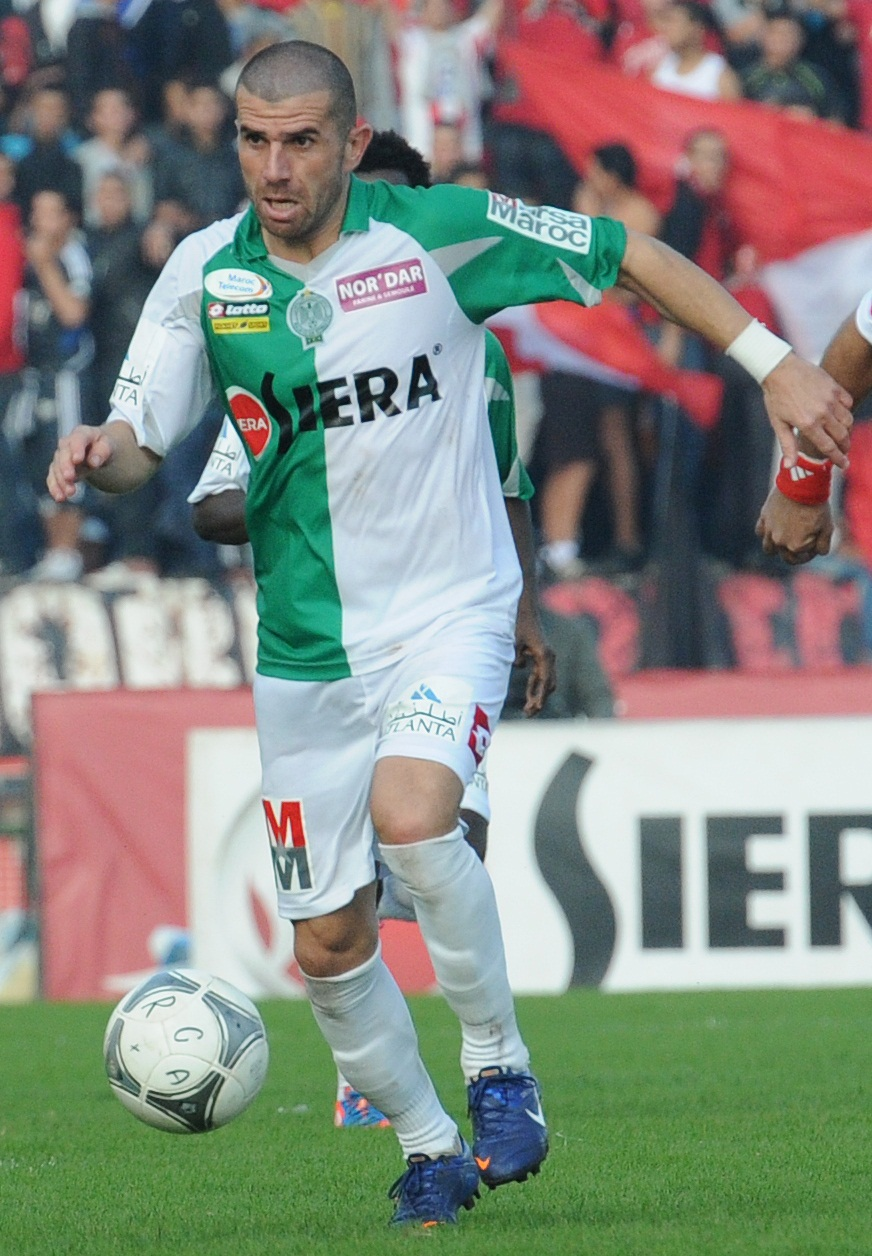
- Chedli with Raja Casablanca in 2012

Personal information
- Full name: Adel Ben-Bechir Chedli
- Date of birth: 16 September 1976 (age 50)
- Place of birth: La Ricamarie, France
- Height: 1.76 m (5 ft 9 in)
- Position: Midfielder

Senior career*
| Years | Team | Apps | (Gls) |
| 1994–1997 | Saint-Étienne | 33 | (0) |
| 1997–2004 | Sochaux | 153 | (3) |
| 2004–2005 | Istres | 24 | (0) |
| 2005–2006 | 1. FC Nürnberg | 8 | (0) |
| 2006–2007 | Sion | 27 | (1) |
| 2007–2008 | Al-Shaab CSC | 5 | (0) |
| 2008–2010 | Istres | 36 | (1) |
| 2010–2012 | Étoile Sportive du Sahel | 48 | (7) |
| 2012–2013 | Raja Casablanca | 2 | (0) |
| Total | | 336 | (12) |

International career
| 1996–2012 | Tunisia | 45 | (4) |

Managerial career
- 2016–2017: Pays d'Aix
- 2017–2018: Olympique Rovenain
- 2018–2019: Arles
Medal record
Men's football
Representing Tunisia
Africa Cup of Nations
| Winner | 2004 Tunisia |
African Nations Championship
| Winner | 2011 Sudan |
- * Club domestic league appearances and goals

Adel Ben-Bechir Chedli (Arabic: عَادِل بْن بَشِير الشَّاذِلِيّ, born 16 September 1976) is a former professional footballer who played as a midfielder. Born in France, he represented Tunisia at international level.

== Club career ==
Born in La Ricamarie, Loire, France, Chedli joined AS Saint-Étienne and broke into the first team in 1996. In 1997, he was transferred to FC Sochaux for whom he played several years in the Ligue 1. It was during that time that also earned his first cap for the Tunisian national team. Before his move to Germany Chedli played for FC Istres. He left the club on a free transfer after they had been relegated to Ligue 2 after playing in 88 games.

At Nürnberg, Chedli had a rough first year and a hard time breaking into the first squad, at the end of the season he had played in only six Bundesliga matches and was at times demoted to the club's Bayernliga reserve team. His situation did not improve when Chedli was sent off twice in a short span, once with the reserves and once in friendly against the Kansas City Wizards. After the latter incident in which Chedli had kicked a Wizards player in the shins, he left the field cursing at Nürnberg first team coach Hans Meyer, an event that the Nürnberg press interpreted as insubordination and predicted an early release of the left midfielder whose contract with Nürnberg would have run until 2007. That prediction became true in July 2006, when player and team agreed on a termination of the contract.

== International career ==
A French youth international, he made his debut for his native Tunisian side on 26 May 1996, a friendly match against Senegal. Due to nationality transfer was not allowed until the 2000s, he's entered the team again and been a regular with the Tunisian national team since 2003 and won the 2004 African Nations' Cup with the "Carthage Eagles". He was also a member of the Tunisian Confederations Cup team in 2005 and was a member of the squad at the 2006 World Cup.

== Honours ==
Tunisia

- Africa Cup of Nations: 2004
