= Sami Trabelsi =

Tunisian association football player

Personal information
- Date of birth: 4 February 1968 (age 58)
- Place of birth: Sfax, Tunisia
- Height: 1.86 m (6 ft 1 in)
- Position: Center back

Team information
- Current team: (manager)

Senior career*
Years	Team	Apps	(Gls)
1986–1993	Sfax RS	187	(6)
1993–2000	CS Sfaxien	191	(8)
2000–2001	Al-Rayyan	22	(1)
2001–2002	CS Sfaxien	28	(0)
Total		428	(15)

International career
1991–2001	Tunisia	81	(3)

Managerial career
- 2011–2013: Tunisia
- 2013–2023: Al Sailiya
- 2025–2026: Tunisia
- 2026: Al-Shorta
- * Club domestic league appearances and goals

Sami Trabelsi (Arabic: سَامِي الطَّرَابُلْسِيّ; born 4 February 1968) is a Tunisian football coach and a former player. He played for a few clubs, most notably CS Sfaxien.

== Playing career ==
=== Club ===
Trabelsi marked his debut in the club Sfax Railways Sports before joining CS Sfaxien. In 1998 FIFA World Cup, he became the leader of the Tunisian national team and he formed an undefeated defense line with Khaled Badra.

=== International ===
Trabelsi had 52 caps for the Tunisia national football team and was a participant at the 1998 FIFA World Cup. After retirement as a player, he became an assistant coach for the Tunisia and coached national side for one match against France as a caretaker coach.

== Managerial career ==
On 11 March 2011, Trabelsi was officially appointed as the manager of the Tunisian national team. But following the failure of the national team to get past the first round at the 2013 Africa Cup of Nations, Tunisia accepted Trabelsi's resignation, and he was replaced by the Tunisian coach Nabil Maâloul.

On 8 June 2013, Trabelsi was named head coach of the Qatari side Al Sailiya. He managed the club for ten years, achieving two Qatari Stars Cups and one Qatar FA Cup.

On 10 February 2025, Trabelsi was reappointed as head coach of Tunisia. On 4 January 2026, he was sacked after a round of 16 elimination to Mali on penalties at the 2025 Africa Cup of Nations.

== Managerial statistics ==
As of 3 January 2026

Team	From	To					
Team	From	To	G	W	D	L	Win %
Tunisia	11 March 2011	8 February 2013	32	13	9	10	40.63
(Qatar) Al Sailiya	8 June 2013	20 March 2023	239	87	51	101	36.40
Tunisia	10 February 2025	4 January 2026	19	11	5	3	57.89
Total			290	111	66	113	38.28

== Honours ==
=== As manager ===
Tunisia

- African Nations Championship: 2011

Al-Sailiya SC

- Qatari Stars Cup: 2020–21, 2021–22
- Qatar FA Cup: 2021

== Decorations ==
- Commander of the National Order of Merit (2012)
