= Mohamed Amine Ben Amor =

Tunisian footballer (born 1992)

Personal information
- Date of birth: 3 May 1992 (age 34)
- Place of birth: Sousse, Tunisia
- Height: 1.80 m (5 ft 11 in)
- Positions: Defensive midfielder; centre midfielder

Senior career*
Years	Team	Apps	(Gls)
2014–2026	Étoile du Sahel	119	(3)
2018	→ Al-Ahli (loan)	5	(0)

International career^{‡}
2015–2019	Tunisia	34	(3)
- * Club domestic league appearances and goals as of 12:02, 17 July 2019 (UTC) ‡ National team caps and goals as of 12:03, 17 July 2019 (UTC)

Mohamed Amine Ben Amor (Arabic: محمد أمين بن عمر; born 3 May 1992) is a Tunisian professional who plays as a midfielder.

== Club career ==
Ben Amor was born in Sousse, Tunisia, and started his career at Étoile Sportive du Sahel in 2014 under Faouzi Benzarti. During his spell there, he was a fan favourite despite being one of the youngest players in the team. He scored 2 goals with his team in 60 appearances. He was decisive in deciding many titles for his team like 2015 CAF Confederation Cup, Tunisian League, and Tunisian Cup.

== International career ==
His success with his team led him to the Tunisian national team for the first time by coach Georges Leekens on 15 June 2015 against Morocco in 2016 African Nations Championship qualification. He scored his first goal against Niger in the group stage of this competition so that Tunisia reached the quarter-finals.

Had been injured just before the 2017 Africa Cup of Nations held in Gabon, which prevented him from participating in the first game against Senegal, where Tunisia was defeated (0-2). He returned in the match Algeria and contributed significantly to the qualification of his team for the quarter-finals of the competition and was selected as one of the best players of the tournament with the testimony of many football analysts.

He made a big contribution to making his team closer to qualifying for the 2018 FIFA World Cup in Russia after striking a ball which hit the Congolese player Wilfred Moke and entered the net in Kinshasa before scoring a goal against Guinea in Conakry. In June 2018 he was named in Tunisia’s 23-man squad for the 2018 FIFA World Cup in Russia.

== Career statistics ==
=== International ===
As of 28 June 2018

Tunisia
Year	Apps	Goals
2015	2	0
2016	11	1
2017	10	1
2018	6	0
2019	1	0
Total	30	2

=== International goals ===
Scores and results list Tunisia's goal tally first.

No	Date	Venue	Opponent	Score	Result	Competition
1.	26 January 2016	Stade Régional Nyamirambo, Kigali, Rwanda	Niger	4–0	5–0	2016 African Nations Championship
2.	7 October 2017	Stade du 28 Septembre, Conakry, Guinea	Guinea	3–1	4–1	2018 FIFA World Cup qualification

== Honours ==
ES Sahel

- Tunisian Ligue Professionnelle 1: 2016
- Tunisian Cup: 2014, 2015
- CAF Confederation Cup: 2015
