= 2011 African Nations Championship =

بطولة أمم أفريقيا للمحليين 2011 2011 CHAN

Tournament details
- Host country: Sudan
- Dates: 4–25 February
- Teams: 16 (from 1 confederation)
- Venues: 5 (in 4 host cities)

Final positions
- Champions: Tunisia (1st title)
- Runners-up: Angola
- Third place: Sudan
- Fourth place: Algeria

Tournament statistics
- Matches played: 32
- Goals scored: 59 (1.84 per match)
- Top scorer(s): (Algeria) El Arbi Hillel Soudani (South Africa) Myron Shongwe (Sudan) Mudather Karika (Tunisia) Zouheir Dhaouadi (Tunisia) Salema Gasdaoui (3 goals)
- Best player: (Tunisia) Zouheir Dhaouadi

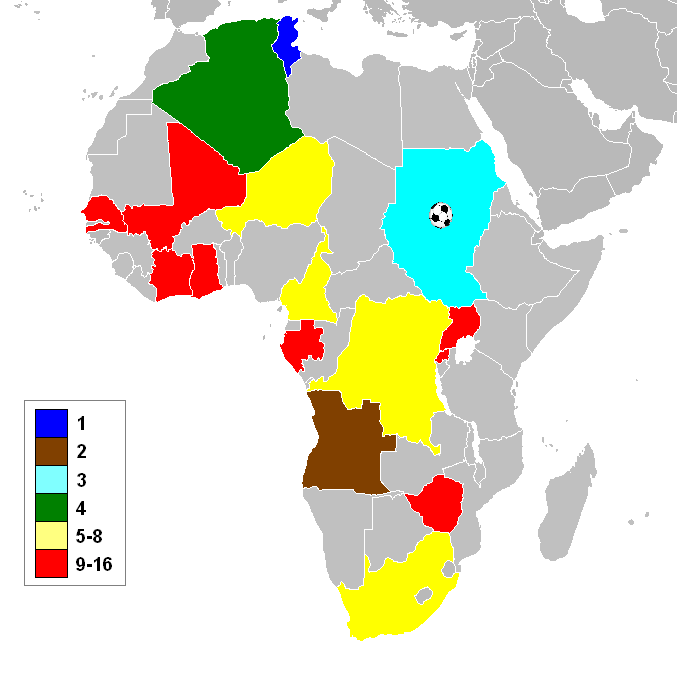
Participating nations

The 2011 African Nations Championship was the second edition of the African Nations Championship tournament. Each participating nation was represented mostly by players who play in their respective local divisions. The competition was hosted in Sudan from February 4 to 25, 2011. Tunisia won their first title by defeating Angola in the final 3–0.

== Qualified nations ==
Team	Qualification
Central Eastern Zone
Sudan	Hosts
Northern Zone
Algeria	Winner Play-off
Tunisia	Winner Play-off
Western Zone A
Mali	Winner 1st Round
Senegal	Winner 1st Round
Western Zone B
Ivory Coast	Winner Play-off
Ghana	Winner Play-off
Niger	Winner Play-off
Central Zone
Cameroon	Winner 1st Round
DR Congo (holders)	Winner 1st Round
Gabon	Winner Play-off
Central Eastern Zone
Rwanda	Winner 2nd Round
Uganda	Winner 2nd Round
Southern Zone
Angola	Winner 2nd Round
South Africa	Winner 2nd Round
Zimbabwe	Winner 2nd Round

== Venues ==
Omdurman	Port Sudan	Khartoum
Al Merreikh Stadium	Port Sudan Stadium	Khartoum Stadium
15.39°N 32.29°E	19.37°N 37.13°E	15.38°N 32.32°E
Capacity: 42,000	Capacity: 13,000	Capacity: 23,000
Omdurman	2011 African Nations Championship is located in Sudan (2005-2011)	Wad Madani
AlHilal Stadium	2011 African Nations Championship is located in Sudan (2005-2011)	Wad Madani Stadium
15.39°N 32.29°E	2011 African Nations Championship is located in Sudan (2005-2011)	14.24°N 33.31°E
Capacity: 15,000	2011 African Nations Championship is located in Sudan (2005-2011)	Capacity: 15,000

== Draw ==
- The Final draw for the Groups was held on Saturday November 27, 2010 in Khartoum. The 16 teams were split into four pots, with Pot 1 containing the top four seeded nations. Sudan are seeded as hosts and Congo DR as reigning holders. Ghana and Senegal have the two strongest records and so they complete the top seeded for Pot 1. A draw will then be done to determine which of these two countries shall be awarded the letter B1 and which one will have the letter D1 .

The remaining twelve countries was categorized into three hats according to the following criteria in order of priority:

- Results in the 1st Edition CHAN 2009
- Zonal Separation as determined by CAF statutes

Pot 1	Pot 2	Pot 3	Pot 4
Sudan (Assigned to A1); DR Congo (Assigned to C1); Ghana; Senegal	Algeria; Ivory Coast; Tunisia; Zimbabwe	Angola; Cameroon; Gabon; South Africa	Mali; Niger; Rwanda; Uganda

== Group stage ==
=== Tie-breaking criteria ===
Where two or more teams end the group stage with the same number of points, their ranking is determined by the following criteria:

1. points earned in the matches between the teams concerned;
2. goal difference in the matches between the teams concerned;
3. number of goals scored in the group matches between the teams concerned;
4. number of away goals scored in the matches between the teams concerned;
5. goal difference in all group matches;
6. number of goals scored in all group matches;
7. Yellow and red cards
8. drawing of lots by the organizing committee.

Key to colors in group tables
Teams that advanced to the quarter-finals

All times are in local, East Africa Time (UTC+03:00).

=== Group A ===
Team	Pld	W	D	L	GF	GA	GD	Pts
Sudan	3	2	1	0	2	0	+2	7
Algeria	3	1	2	0	4	2	+2	5
Gabon	3	1	1	1	4	4	0	4
Uganda	3	0	0	3	1	5	−4	0

4 February 2011
20:30

Sudan	1–0	Gabon
Mudather Karika 19'	Report

Khartoum Stadium, Khartoum
Referee: Rajindraparsad Seechurn (Mauritius)

5 February 2011
15:30

Uganda	0–2	Algeria
	Report	Djabou 18'; Soudani 62'

Khartoum Stadium, Khartoum
Referee: Koman Coulibaly (Mali)

8 February 2011
17:30

Gabon	2–2	Algeria
Lengoualama 51'; Bembangoye 90+2'	Report	Soudani 70' 89'

Khartoum Stadium, Khartoum
Referee: Ali Lemghaifry (Mauritania)

8 February 2011
20:00

Sudan	1–0	Uganda
Mudather Karika 9'	Report

Khartoum Stadium, Khartoum
Referee: Ousmane Fall (Senegal)

12 February 2011
20:00

Sudan	0–0	Algeria
	Report

Khartoum Stadium, Khartoum
Referee: Eddy Maillet (Seychelles)

12 February 2011
20:00

Gabon	2–1	Uganda
Pitty Djoué 65' 69'	Report	Sadam 88'

AlHilal Stadium, Omdurman
Referee: Désiré Noumandiez Doué (Ivory Coast)

=== Group B ===
Team	Pld	W	D	L	GF	GA	GD	Pts
South Africa	3	3	0	0	6	2	+4	9
Niger	3	2	0	1	2	2	0	6
Zimbabwe	3	1	0	2	2	3	−1	3
Ghana	3	0	0	3	1	4	−3	0

5 February 2011
17:30

Ghana	1–2	South Africa
Larbi 19'	Report	Shongwe 57'; Shabangu 88'

Stade Wad Medani, Wad Madani
Referee: Khalid Abdel Rahman (Sudan)

5 February 2011
20:00

Zimbabwe	0–1	Niger
	Report	Abdelkader 76'

Stade Wad Medani, Wad Madani
Referee: Mal Mohamadou (Cameroon)

9 February 2011
17:30

South Africa	2–0	Niger
Shongwe 56' 87'	Report

Stade Wad Medani, Wad Madani
Referee: Wellington Kaoma (Zambia)

9 February 2011
20:00

Ghana	0–1	Zimbabwe
	Report	Gutu 70'

Stade Wad Medani, Wad Madani
Referee: Hélder Martins de Carvalho (Angola)

13 February 2011
20:00

Ghana	0–1	Niger
	Report	Tukur 89'

Stade Wad Medani, Wad Madani
Referee: Slim Jedidi (Tunisia)

13 February 2011
20:00

South Africa	2–1	Zimbabwe
Shabangu 33'; Mkhwanazi 62'	Report	Maroto 2'

AlHilal Stadium, Omdurman
Referee: Djamel Haimoudi (Algeria)

=== Group C ===
Team	Pld	W	D	L	GF	GA	GD	Pts
Cameroon	3	3	0	0	5	0	+5	9
DR Congo	3	1	1	1	3	4	−1	4
Ivory Coast	3	1	0	2	2	4	−2	3
Mali	3	0	1	2	1	3	−2	1

6 February 2011
17:30

DR Congo	0–2	Cameroon
	Report	Momasso 42'; Baba 80'

Al Merreikh Stadium, Omdurman
Referee: Daniel Bennett (South Africa)

6 February 2011
20:00

Ivory Coast	1–0	Mali
Koné 23'	Report

Al Merreikh Stadium, Omdurman
Referee: Eddy Maillet (Seychelles)

10 February 2011
17:30

Cameroon	1–0	Mali
Sagong 68'	Report

Al Merreikh Stadium, Omdurman
Referee: Slim Jedidi (Tunisia)

10 February 2011
20:00

DR Congo	2–1	Ivory Coast
Salakiaku 18'; Kaluyituka 31'	Report	Mangoua 8'

Al Merreikh Stadium, Omdurman
Referee: Jose Rachide (Mozambique)

14 February 2011
20:00

Cameroon	2–0	Ivory Coast
Monkam 54'; Ekane 90'	Report

Khartoum Stadium, Khartoum
Referee: Rajindraparsad Seechurn (Mauritius)

14 February 2011
20:00

DR Congo	1–1	Mali
Kabangu 82'	Report	Bagayoko 80'

Al Merreikh Stadium, Omdurman
Referee: Mohamed Ragab Omar (Libya)

=== Group D ===
Team	Pld	W	D	L	GF	GA	GD	Pts
Tunisia	3	2	1	0	6	2	+4	7
Angola	3	1	2	0	3	2	+1	5
Senegal	3	1	1	1	2	2	0	4
Rwanda	3	0	0	3	2	7	-5	0

7 February 2011
17:30

Senegal	2–0	Rwanda
M. Kasse 89'; M.N. Diop 90+3'	Report

Stade Port Sudan, Port Sudan
Referee: Djamel Haimoudi (Algeria)

7 February 2011
20:00

Angola	1–1	Tunisia
Kali 90+2'	Report	M'sakni 7'

Stade Port Sudan, Port Sudan
Referee: Désiré Noumandiez Doué (Ivory Coast)

11 February 2011
17:30

Tunisia	3–1	Rwanda
Darragi 21'; Gasdaoui 32'; Dhaouadi 44'	Report	Tuyisenge 23'

Stade Port Sudan, Port Sudan
Referee: Bakary Gassama (Gambia)

11 February 2011
20:00

Senegal	0–0	Angola
	Report

Stade Port Sudan, Port Sudan
Referee: Mohamed Ragab Omar (Libya)

15 February 2011
20:00

Senegal	0–2	Tunisia
	Report	Gasdaoui 45'; Korbi 88'

Stade Port Sudan, Port Sudan
Referee: Khalid Abdel Rahman (Sudan)

15 February 2011
20:00

Rwanda	1–2	Angola
Mugiraneza 18'	Report	Love 31'; Osório 57'

AlHilal Stadium, Omdurman
Referee: Mal Mohamadou (Cameroon)

== Knockout phase ==
All times are in local, East Africa Time (UTC+03:00).

Quarter-finals
18 February 2011 – Khartoum
South Africa	0
Algeria	2
19 February 2011 – Khartoum
Tunisia	1
DR Congo	0
18 February 2011 – Omdurman
Sudan (pen.)	1 (4)
Niger	1 (3)
19 February 2011 – Omdurman
Cameroon	0 (7)
Angola (pen.)	0 (8)

Semi-finals
22 February 2011 – Khartoum
Algeria	1 (3)
Tunisia (pen.)	1 (5)
22 February 2011 – Omdurman
Sudan	1 (2)
Angola (pen.)	1 (4)

Final
25 February 2011 – Omdurman
Tunisia	3
Angola	0
Third Place
25 February 2011 – Omdurman
Algeria	0
Sudan	1

=== Quarter-finals ===
18 February 2011
17:00

South Africa	0–2	Algeria
	Report	Maïza 44' (pen.); Metref 90+2'

Khartoum Stadium, Khartoum
Referee: Ousmane Fall (Senegal)

18 February 2011
20:30

Sudan	1–1 (a.e.t.)	Niger
Bakri 17'	Report	Modibo 65'
Penalties
Muhannad El Tahir (penalty scored); Saif Eldin (penalty missed); Mosaab (penalty scored); Mohamed Ali Safari (penalty scored); Hitham (penalty scored)	4–3	(penalty scored) Idrissa; (penalty missed) Modibo; (penalty scored) Abdoul Karim; (penalty missed) Sabiou; (penalty scored) Moctar

AlHilal Stadium, Omdurman
Referee: Daniel Bennett (South Africa)

19 February 2011
17:00

Cameroon	0–0 (a.e.t.)	Angola
	Report
Penalties
Bebey (penalty scored); Balokog (penalty scored); Nguemaleu (penalty scored); Ashu (penalty scored); Sagong (penalty missed); Ndame (penalty scored); Moundi (penalty scored); Monkam (penalty scored); Ekane (penalty missed)	7–8	(penalty scored) Job; (penalty missed) Osório; (penalty scored) Miguel; (penalty scored) Kali; (penalty scored) Love; (penalty scored) Santana; (penalty scored) D.Masunguna; (penalty scored) Zé Kalanga; (penalty scored) Fabricio

Al Merreikh Stadium, Omdurman
Referee: Eddy Maillet (Seychelles)

19 February 2011
20:30

Tunisia	1–0	DR Congo
Dhaouadi 50'	Report

Khartoum Stadium, Khartoum
Referee: Koman Coulibaly (Mali)

=== Semi-finals ===
22 February 2011
17:00

Algeria	1–1 (a.e.t.)	Tunisia
Djabou 62'	Report	Gasdaoui 18'
Penalties
Feham (penalty scored); Lemmouchia (penalty scored); Meftah (penalty scored); Metref (penalty missed)	3–5	(penalty scored) Darragi; (penalty scored) Souissi; (penalty scored) Gharbi; (penalty scored) Hicheri; (penalty scored) Korbi

Khartoum Stadium, Khartoum
Referee: Rajindraparsad Seechurn (Mauritius)

22 February 2011
20:30

Sudan	1–1 (a.e.t.)	Angola
Saif Eldin Ali 45'	Report	Love 71'
Penalties
	2–4

Al Merreikh Stadium, Omdurman
Referee: Désiré Noumandiez Doué (Ivory Coast)

=== Third Place Playoff ===
25 February 2011
15:30

Algeria	0–1	Sudan
	Report	Mudather Karika 37'

Al Merreikh Stadium, Omdurman
Referee: Eddy Maillet (Seychelles)

=== Final ===
25 February 2011
20:30

Tunisia	3–0	Angola
Traoui 47'; Dhaouadi 74'; Darragi 80'	Report

Al Merreikh Stadium, Omdurman
Referee: Daniel Bennett (South Africa)

2011 African Nations Championship
champions

Tunisia
First title

== Scorers ==
3 goals

- (Algeria) El Arbi Hillel Soudani
- (South Africa) Myron Shongwe
- (Sudan) Mudather Karika
- (Tunisia) Zouheir Dhaouadi
- (Tunisia) Salema Gasdaoui

2 goals

- (Algeria) Abdelmoumene Djabou
- (Angola) Love
- (Gabon) Jerry Nelson Pitty Djoué
- (South Africa) Bheki Leonard Shabangu
- (Tunisia) Oussama Darragi

1 goal

- (Algeria) Adel Maïza
- (Algeria) Hocine Metref
- (Angola) Kali
- (Angola) Osório Carvalho
- (Cameroon) Ousmaïla Baba
- (Cameroon) Jean Paul Ekane Ngah
- (Cameroon) Joseph Julien Momasso
- (Cameroon) Arnaud Monkam Guekam
- (Cameroon) Geremi Sagong
- (Democratic Republic of the Congo) Mulota Kabangu
- (Democratic Republic of the Congo) Dioko Kaluyituka
- (Democratic Republic of the Congo) Matondo Salakiaku
- (Ivory Coast) Zoumana Koné
- (Ivory Coast) Kesse Jean-Paul Mangoua
- (Gabon) Jean Ulrich Bembangoye
- (Gabon) Johan Diderot Lengoualama
- (Ghana) Coomson Daniel Larbi
- (Mali) Alou Bagayoko
- (Niger) Abdelkader Adamou Tiemou
- (Niger) Tukur Gambo
- (Niger) Sidibe Issa Modibo
- (Rwanda) Jean Baptiste Mugiraneza
- (Rwanda) Jacques Tuyisenge
- (Senegal) Mohamed Niang Diop
- (Senegal) Moustapha Kassé
- (South Africa) Nhlakanipho Already Mkhwanazi
- (Sudan) Bakri Al-Madina
- (Sudan) Saif Eldin Ali Idris Farah
- (Tunisia) Khaled Korbi
- (Tunisia) Youssef Msakni
- (Tunisia) Mejdi Traoui
- (Uganda) Juma Sadam Ibrahim
- (Zimbabwe) Archford Gutu
- (Zimbabwe) Norman Maroto
