= Abdoulaye Diarra (footballer, born 1994) =

Malian footballer

Personal information
- Date of birth: 28 December 1994 (age 31)
- Place of birth: Mali
- Height: 1.83 m (6 ft 0 in)
- Position: Striker

Team information
- Current team: Maghreb de Fès
- Number: 20

Senior career*
Years	Team	Apps	(Gls)
2011–2016	CO de Bamako		
2016–2017	IR Tanger	11	(0)
2017–2020	Rapide Oued Zem	74	(14)
2020-	Maghreb de Fès	28	(2)

International career^{‡}
2015–2016	Mali	8	(2)
- * Club domestic league appearances and goals as of 18 November 2021 ‡ National team caps and goals as of 18 November 2021

Abdoulaye Diarra (French pronunciation: [abdulaj djaʁa]; born 28 December 1994) is a Malian international footballer who plays for Maghreb de Fès.

== International career ==
=== International goals ===
Scores and results list Mali's goal tally first.

Goal	Date	Venue	Opponent	Score	Result	Competition
1.	18 October 2015	Stade du 26 Mars, Bamako, Mali	Mauritania	2–1	2–1	2016 African Nations Championship qualification
2.	31 January 2016	Stade Régional Nyamirambo, Kigali, Rwanda	Tunisia	2–1	2–1	2016 African Nations Championship
