= Aymen Mathlouthi =

Tunisian footballer (born 1984)

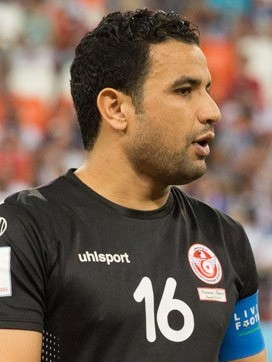
- Mathlouthi with Tunisia at the 2018 FIFA World Cup

Personal information
- Full name: Aymen Mathlouthi
- Date of birth: 14 September 1984 (age 42)
- Place of birth: Tunis, Tunisia
- Height: 1.82 m (6 ft 0 in)
- Position: Goalkeeper

Youth career
- 1995–2001: Club Africain

Senior career*
Years	Team	Apps	(Gls)
2001–2003	Club Africain	0	(0)
2003–2018	Étoile du Sahel	302	(0)
2018	Al-Batin	7	(0)
2018–2019	Club Africain	5	(0)
2019	Al-Adalah	10	(0)
2020–2023	Étoile du Sahel	38	(0)

International career^{‡}
2007–2022	Tunisia	73	(0)

Managerial career
- 2025: Tunisia U20 (Assistant)
- * Club domestic league appearances and goals as of 23:55, 25 November 2022 (UTC) ‡ National team caps and goals as of 23:50, 25 November 2022 (UTC)

Aymen Mathlouthi (Arabic: أَيْمَن الْمَثْلُوثِيّ; born 14 September 1984), also known as Balbouli, is a Tunisian former professional footballer who played as a goalkeeper.

Regarded by pundits as the best Tunisian goalkeepers and one of the best African goalkeepers of all time, some of his highlighted traits apart from goalkeeping, is his smooth ball control, and dribbling inside the penalty area. Mathlouthi won the 2011 African Nations Championship held in Sudan. The Confederation of African Football (CAF) chose Mathlouthi as the best goalkeeper in the 2015 Africa Cup of Nations held in Equatorial Guinea, being also included in the CAF Team of the Tournament. He was Tunisia's starting goalkeeper vs Panama at the last group stage match of the 2018 World Cup, which also marked his World Cup debut. Called-up for the 2022 World Cup, it was his second representing his country.

== Club career ==
From his earliest years, Mathlouthi joined the team's training center in his hometown (Djebel Lahmar in El Omrane), at JS El Omrane, where he trained as a goalkeeper.

In 1995, he decided to join Club Africain. Later, he joined Étoile du Sahel based in Sousse in 1998 and achieved all possible national and continental glory at the club. He also participated at the 2007 FIFA Club World Cup in Japan and finished in fourth place after defeating Mexican team CF Pachuca in the quarter-finals 1–0.

On 27 January 2018, he joined Saudi club Al-Batin on a free transfer. On 23 July 2018, he returned to Club Africain, where he started his professional career, in a two-year deal. He later returned to Saudi Arabia, this time to Al-Adalah and then came back to Étoile du Sahel.

== International career ==
Mathlouthi received his first call-up with the Tunisia national team for the first time to replace Adel Nefzi in a 2008 Africa Cup of Nations qualification match against the Seychelles on 23 March 2007. Since then, he has played constantly. He participated in all editions of Africa Cup of Nations since 2010 and 2011 African Nations Championship.

In June 2018, he was named in Tunisia’s 23-man squad for the 2018 FIFA World Cup in Russia. After sitting on the bench of two matches, he was finally given the chance to make his historic World Cup debut in the final game against Panama due to injuries of Mouez Hassen and Farouk Ben Mustapha.

== Personal life ==
Mathlouthi married on 13 May 2016. He celebrated his wedding in Sousse surrounded by his family and friends from Étoile du Sahel and the Tunisian team.

== Career statistics ==
=== International ===
As of 17 July 2019

Appearances and goals by national team and year
National team	Year	Apps	Goals
Tunisia	2007	1	0
Tunisia	2008	7	0
Tunisia	2009	3	0
Tunisia	2010	7	0
Tunisia	2011	6	0
Tunisia	2012	11	0
Tunisia	2013	1	0
Tunisia	2014	4	0
Tunisia	2015	9	0
Tunisia	2016	5	0
Tunisia	2017	10	0
Tunisia	2018	2	0
Tunisia	2019	1	0
Total		67	0

== Honours ==
ES Sahel

- Tunisian Ligue Professionnelle 1: 2007, 2016
- Tunisian Cup: 2012, 2014, 2015
- CAF Champions League: 2007
- CAF Confederation Cup: 2006, 2015
- CAF Super Cup: 2008
- African Cup Winners' Cup: 2003

Tunisia

- African Nations Championship: 2011

Individual

- Mathlouthi was named in the substitutes of the 2016 CAF Team of The Year, but was the First-Choice Goalkeeper in 2017.
