= Port Sudan Stadium =

Sports venue in Port Sudan, Sudan

Coordinates: 19°37′04″N 37°12′43″E

- Interactive map of Port Sudan Stadium
- Full name: Port Sudan International Stadium
- Location: Port Sudan, Sudan
- Capacity: 20,000

Tenants
- Hay Al-Arab SC; Hilal Alsahil SC

Port Sudan International Stadium (Arabic: استاد بورتسودان الدولي) is a multi-use stadium in Port Sudan, Sudan. It is currently used mostly for football matches and is the home stadium of Hay Al-Arab SC and Hilal Alsahil SC. The stadium has a capacity of 20,000. It hosted the 2011 African Nations Championship which was held in Sudan.
