= Alsény Camara (footballer, born 1995) =

Guinean footballer

Personal information
- Full name: Alsény Camara Agogo
- Date of birth: 4 January 1995 (age 31)
- Place of birth: Kamsar, Guinea
- Position: Forward

Senior career*
Years	Team	Apps	(Gls)
2013–2016	AS Kaloum Star		
2016–2017	Hassania Agadir	5	(0)
2016–2020	Horoya AC		
2020–2021	AS Kaloum Star		
2020–2021	ASEC Ndiambour		
2021–2022	AS Dakar Sacré-Cœur		
2022–2023	Guédiawaye FC		
2023–	Rayon Sports F.C.		

International career
2015–2016	Guinea	9	(2)
- * Club domestic league appearances and goals

Alsény Camara Agogo (born 4 January 1995) is a Guinean footballer who plays for Rayon Sports F.C. He made 9 appearances for Guinea. He plays centre forward.

== International career ==
=== International goals ===
Scores and results list Guinea's goal tally first.

No	Date	Venue	Opponent	Score	Result	Competition
1.	18 January 2018	Stade Régional Nyamirambo, Kigali, Rwanda	Tunisia	1–1	2–2	2016 African Nations Championship
2.	18 January 2018	Stade Régional Nyamirambo, Kigali, Rwanda	Tunisia	2–2	2–2	2016 African Nations Championship
