= Khaled Souissi =

Tunisian footballer

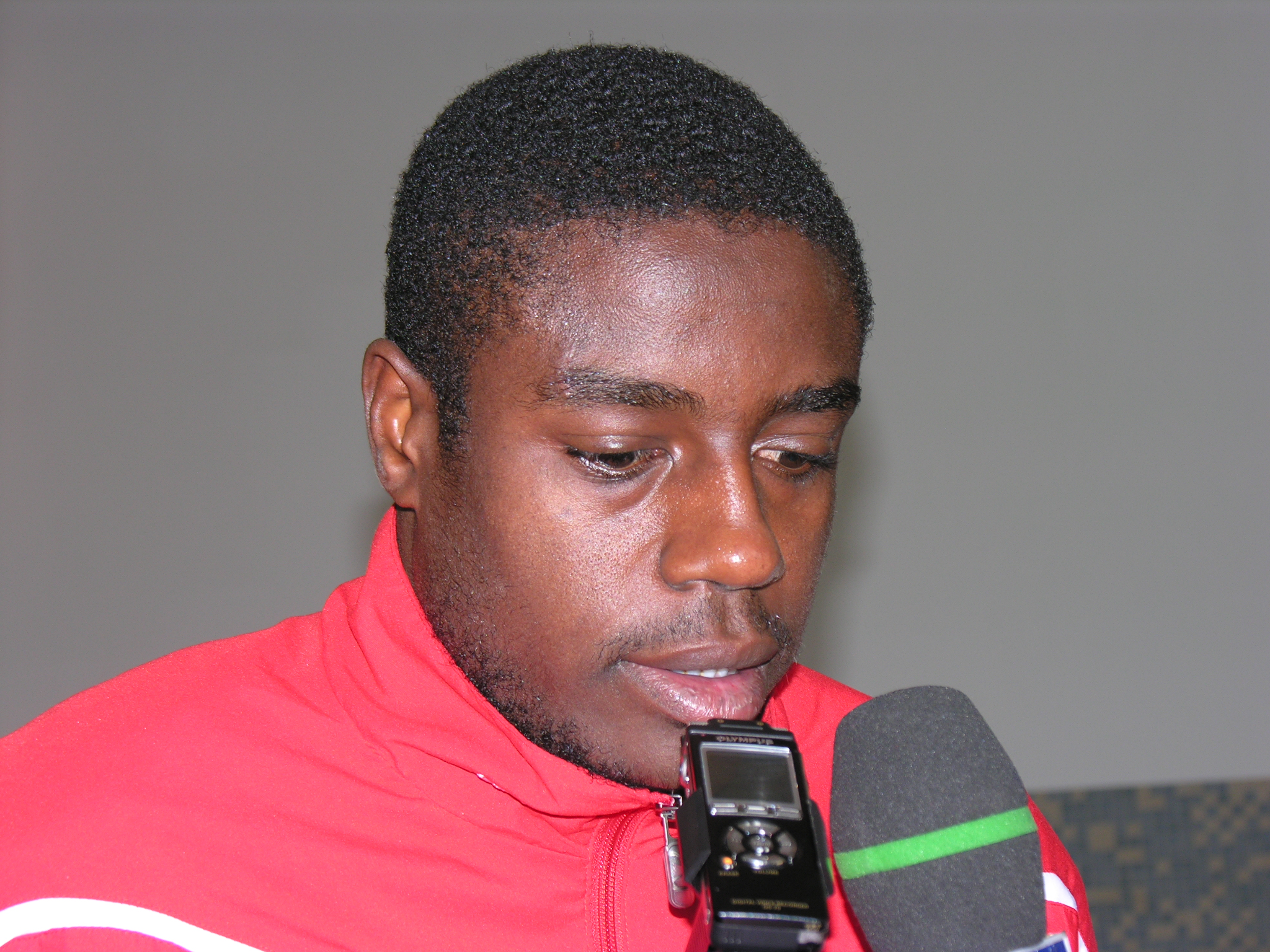

Personal information
- Full name: Khaled Souissi
- Date of birth: May 20, 1985 (age 41)
- Place of birth: Tunis, Tunisia
- Height: 1.80 m (5 ft 11 in)
- Position: Center back

Senior career*
| Years | Team | Apps | (Gls) |
| 2004–2011 | Club Africain | 150 | (1) |
| 2011–2012 | Arles-Avignon | 9 | (0) |
| 2012–2013 | Club Africain | 20 | (0) |
| 2013–2014 | EGS Gafsa | 19 | (0) |

International career^{‡}
| 2006–2013 | Tunisia | 18 | (0) |
- * Club domestic league appearances and goals as of 1 August 2018 ‡ National team caps and goals as of 1 August 2018

Khaled Soussi (born 20 May 1985 in Tunis) is a Tunisian former professional footballer who last played for EGS Gafsa as a defender. He has won 18 caps for the Tunisia national football team.
