= Mehdi Meriah =

Tunisian footballer

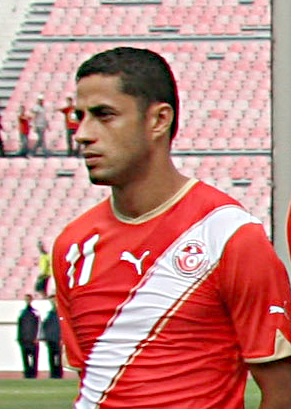

Personal information
- Date of birth: 5 June 1979 (age 47)
- Place of birth: Ariana, Tunisia
- Height: 1.81 m (5 ft 11 1/2 in)
- Position: Left back

Senior career*
Years	Team	Apps	(Gls)
1999	Club Africain		
1999–2000	AS Ariana		
2000–2002	AS Djerba		
2002–2003	EGS Gafsa		
2003–2006	US Monastir		
2006–2009	Étoile du Sahel		
2009–2012	Club Africain	32	(0)

International career^{‡}
2006–2010	Tunisia	7	(0)
- * Club domestic league appearances and goals as of 6 April 2013 ‡ National team caps and goals as of 6 April 2013

Mehdi Meriah (born 5 June 1979) is a retired Tunisian football (soccer) player who played as a left back or a midfielder.

He was called up to the Tunisian national team to participate in the 2006 World Cup but after he sustained an injury in the week leading up to the tournament was replaced by Haykel Guemamdia.
