= 2009 African Nations Championship qualification =

The qualification phase for the 2009 African Championship of Nations began in March 2008. These games did not count towards the FIFA rankings.

The inaugural edition of the competition featured eight teams.

== North zone (1 seat) ==
=== Preliminary Round ===
Team 1	Agg.	Team 2	1st leg	2nd leg
Libya	2:2 (6:5)	Tunisia	1:1	1:1

=== First Round ===
Team 1	Agg.	Team 2	1st leg	2nd leg
Algeria	2:2 (1:3)	Morocco	1:1	1:1
Libya	w/o	Egypt	w/o	

=== Second Round ===
Team 1	Agg.	Team 2	1st leg	2nd leg
Morocco	3:4	Libya	3:1	0:3

- Libya qualified to CHAN - Côte d'Ivoire 2009.

== Zone West A (1 seat) ==
=== Preliminary Round ===
Team 1	Agg.	Team 2	1st leg	2nd leg
Gambia (The Gambia)	1:1	Mauritania	1:1	0:0

=== First Round ===
Team 1	Agg.	Team 2	1st leg	2nd leg
Senegal	0:0 (5:4)	Mali	0:0	0:0
Mauritania	3:3	Guinea	2:2	1:1

=== Second Round ===
Team 1	Agg.	Team 2	1st leg	2nd leg
Guinea	1:1 (1:3)	Senegal	1:0	0:1

- Senegal qualified to the CHAN - Côte d'Ivoire 2009.

== Zone West B (1 seat) ==
=== Preliminary Round ===
Team 1	Agg.	Team 2	1st leg	2nd leg
Ghana	4:1	Niger	2:0	2:1
Togo	w/o	Benin	w/o	

=== First Round ===
Team 1	Agg.	Team 2	1st leg	2nd leg
Ghana	4:2	Togo	2:0	2:2
Nigeria	4:1	Burkina Faso	2:0	2:1

=== Second Round ===
Team 1	Agg.	Team 2	1st leg	2nd leg
Ghana	3:2	Nigeria	3:2	0:0

- Ghana qualified to CHAN - Côte d'Ivoire 2009.

== Central Zone (1 seat) ==
=== Preliminary Round ===
Team 1	Agg.	Team 2	1st leg	2nd leg
Central African Republic	0:2	Gabon	0:2	w/o
Congo (Republic of the Congo)	w/o	Chad	Abd	

- The Chadian Football Federation was suspended by CAF following a similar suspension by the FIFA due to the country's violation of the article guaranteeing the independence of FIFA member associations. Thus, the Chad national team was disqualified.

=== First Round ===
Team 1	Agg.	Team 2	1st leg	2nd leg
Cameroon	3:2	Gabon	1:2	2:0
Congo DR (Democratic Republic of the Congo)	4:2	(Republic of the Congo) Congo	3:0	1:2

=== Second Round ===
Team 1	Agg.	Team 2	1st leg	2nd leg
Cameroon	0:3	(Democratic Republic of the Congo) Congo DR	0:2	0:1

- DR Congo qualified to CHAN - Côte d'Ivoire 2009.

== Southern Zone (2 seats) ==
=== Preliminary Round ===
Team 1	Agg.	Team 2	1st leg	2nd leg
Malawi	2:2	Mozambique	2:1	0:1
Swaziland (Eswatini)	1:4	Zambia	1:1	0:3

=== First Round ===
Team 1	Agg.	Team 2	1st leg	2nd leg
Mozambique	1:2	Angola	1:1	0:1
Botswana	1:3	Zambia	1:0	0:3
Zimbabwe	1:0	Namibia	0:0	1:0
South Africa	w/o	Mauritius	w/o	

=== Second Round ===
Sun, 30 Nov 2008 R2 1L	Angola	0–1	Zambia	Estádio da Cidadela, Luanda
15:35 WAT (UTC+1)			26' Singuluma	Referee: Arvo Mufeti (Namibia)

Sat, 13 Dec 2008 R2 2L	Zambia	2–1	Angola	Konkola Stadium, Chililabombwe
15:00 WAT (UTC+1)	Singuluma 30'; Njovu 87'		42' (pen.) Love

Sun, 30 Nov 2008 R2 1L	South Africa	0–1	Zimbabwe
WAT (UTC+1)

Fri, 12 Dec 2008 R2 2L	Zimbabwe	2–1	South Africa
WAT (UTC+1)

- Zambia and Zimbabwe qualified to CHAN - Côte d'Ivoire 2009.

== Central East Zone (1 seat) ==
=== Preliminary Round ===
Team 1	Agg.	Team 2	1st leg	2nd leg
Rwanda	1:0	Burundi	1:0	0:0
Kenya	1:2	Tanzania	1:0	0:2
Eritrea	2:5	Uganda	2:2	0:3

=== First Round ===
Team 1	Agg.	Team 2	1st leg	2nd leg
Sudan	5:1	Rwanda	4:0	1:1
Tanzania	3:1	Uganda	2:0	1:1

=== Second Round ===
Team 1	Agg.	Team 2	1st leg	2nd leg
Tanzania	5:2	Sudan	3:1	2:1

- Tanzania qualified to CHAN - Côte d'Ivoire 2009.
