= Zouheir Dhaouadi =

Tunisian footballer

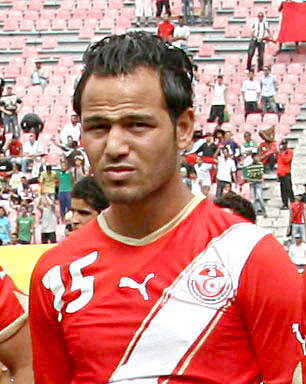
- Dhaouadi with Tunisia in 2010

Personal information
- Date of birth: 1 January 1988 (age 38)
- Place of birth: Kairouan, Tunisia
- Height: 1.80 m (5 ft 11 in)
- Position: Left winger

Senior career*
Years	Team	Apps	(Gls)
2006–2012	Club Africain	108	(21)
2012	Évian Thonon Gaillard	8	(1)
2013–2015	Club Africain	59	(13)
2015–2016	Al-Wehda	12	(2)
2016–2017	ES Sahel	18	(2)
2017–2024	Club Africain	96	(9)

International career
2006–2014	Tunisia	34	(5)
- * Club domestic league appearances and goals

Zouheir Dhaouadi (born 1 January 1988) is a Tunisian former professional footballer who played as a winger.

== Career ==
Dhaouadi was born in Kairouan. He transferred in July 2006 from JS Kairouan to Club Africain, where he played until 2012. On 10 July 2012, Dhaouadi signed a three-year deal with Ligue 1 outfit Évian.

Dhaouadi has played for the Tunisia national team on 34 occasions, including four games in the 2010 Africa Cup of Nations. He has scored four goals for the national side.

== Career statistics ==
As of 27 May 2014
Scores and results list Tunisia's goal tally first, score column indicates score after each Dhaouadi goal.

List of international goals scored by Zouheir Dhaouadi
No.	Date	Venue	Opponent	Score	Result	Competition
1	13 January 2010	Tundavala National Stadium, Lubango, Angola	Zambia	1–1	1–1	2010 Africa Cup of Nations
2	9 January 2012	Sheikh Zayed Cricket Stadium, Abu Dhabi, United Arab Emirates	Sudan	2–0	3–0	Friendly
3	16 October 2012	Sheikh Zayed Cricket Stadium, Abu Dhabi, United Arab Emirates	Egypt	1–0	1–0	Friendly
4	14 November 2012	Stade Olympique de Sousse, Sousse, Tunisia	Switzerland	1–1	1–2	Friendly
5	28 May 2014	Seoul World Cup Stadium, Seoul, South-Korea	South Korea	1–0	1–1	Friendly
