= Mejdi Traoui =

Tunisian footballer (born 1983)

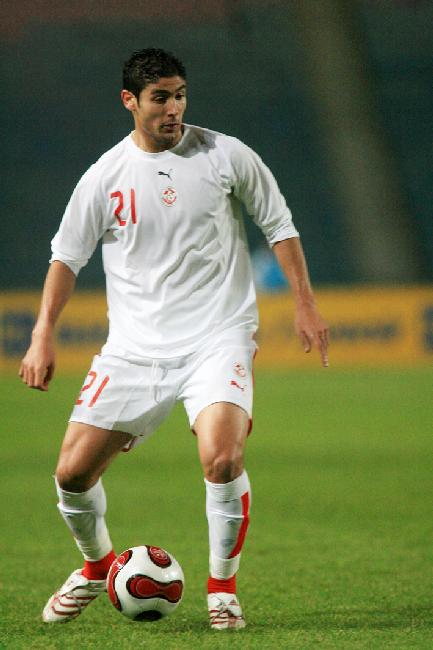
- Traoui with Tunisia in 2008

Personal information
- Full name: Mejdi Traoui
- Date of birth: December 13, 1983 (age 42)
- Place of birth: Sousse, Tunisia
- Height: 1.84 m (6 ft 0 in)
- Position: Midfielder

Senior career*
| Years | Team | Apps | (Gls) |
| 2002–2008 | Étoile du Sahel | 149 | (28) |
| 2008–2010 | Red Bull Salzburg | 2 | (0) |
| 2009 | → Al-Wehda Club (loan) | 6 | (0) |
| 2010–2014 | Espérance de Tunis | 99 | (5) |

International career
| 2004–2014 | Tunisia | 41 | (1) |
- * Club domestic league appearances and goals

Mejdi Traoui (born December 13, 1983, in Sousse) is a Tunisian footballer.

== Career ==
On May 1, 2008, Traoui signed a contract at Red Bull Salzburg until summer 2011. He made two substitute appearances in the Austrian Bundesliga for Red Bull Salzburg during 2008. In January 2009 he was loaned to Al-Wehda for the remainder of the season.

== International career ==
Traoui was part of the Tunisia 2004 Olympic football team, which exited in the first round, finishing third in group C, behind group and gold medal winners Argentina and runners-up Australia.

Traoui was picked by Tunisia for the 2008 Africa Cup of Nations. He scored a late equaliser, during Tunisia's 2–2 draw with Senegal during the first round of games in Tunisia's group D, on January 23.
