= Salema Kasdaoui =

Tunisian footballer

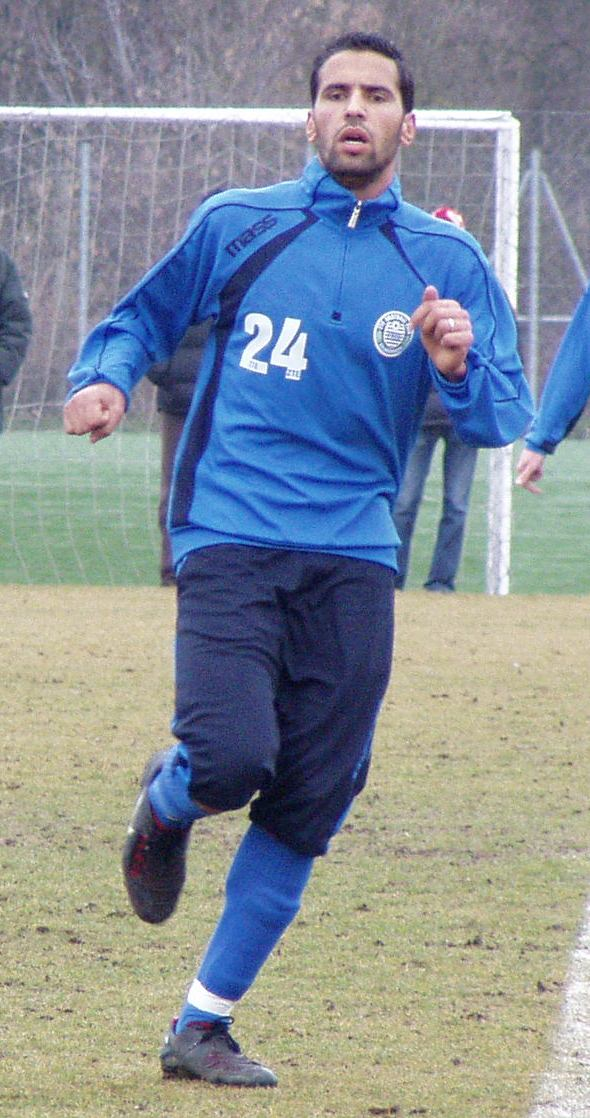

Personal information
- Date of birth: 25 November 1984 (age 41)
- Place of birth: Dahmani, Tunisia
- Height: 1.86 m (6 ft 1 in)
- Position: Forward

Team information
- Current team: Club Africain
- Number: 30

Senior career*
Years	Team	Apps	(Gls)
2003–2004	Jendouba Sport		
2004–2008	Esperance Tunis		
2008–2009	APEP FC	12	(1)
2009–2010	Stade Tunisien	5	(1)
2010–2011	JS Kairouan	21	(7)
2011–2012	CS Sfaxien	19	(2)
2012–2014	Club Africain	30	(3)
2014–2015	CS Hammam-Lif	19	(4)
2015–2016	AS Kasserine	3	(0)
2016	That Ras Club		
2016–2017	Stade Tunisien		
2017–2018	CS Hammam-Lif		
2018–2021	FC Nouadhibou		

International career
2006–2013	Tunisia	5	(0)
- * Club domestic league appearances and goals

Salema Kasdaoui (born 25 November 1984) is a Tunisian professional footballer who plays as a forward.
