= Khaled Korbi =

Tunisian footballer

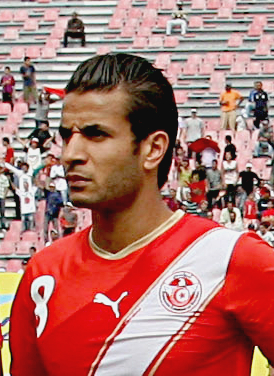
- Korbi with Tunisia in 2010

Personal information
- Full name: Khaled Korbi
- Date of birth: 16 December 1985 (age 40)
- Place of birth: La Manouba, Tunisia
- Height: 1.83 m (6 ft 0 in)
- Position: Midfielder

Youth career
- MS Manouba
- 2004–2006: Stade Tunisien

Senior career*
Years	Team	Apps	(Gls)
2006–2009	Stade Tunisien	70	(4)
2009–2012	Espérance	62	(6)
2012–2012	Al-Sailiya	11	(0)
2013–2013	Al-Wakrah	4	(0)
2013–2014	Club Africain	10	(0)
2015	Raja CA		
2015–2016	Stade Tunisien	10	(0)

International career^{‡}
2007–2014	Tunisia	24	(2)
- * Club domestic league appearances and goals as of 00:00, 7 June 2012 (UTC) ‡ National team caps and goals as of 00:00, 7 June 2012 (UTC)

Khaled Korbi (born 16 December 1985) is a retired Tunisian professional footballer who played as a central midfielder in his club career and for the Tunisia national team.

== Club career ==
On 6 June 2012, Korbi joined Qatar Stars League club Al-Sailiya, signing a two-year contract with the club. On 22 December, he reached a mutual agreement with the club to terminate his contract.
