= DR Congo national football team results (2010–2019) =

This article provides details of international football games played by the DR Congo national football team from 2010 to 2019.

== Results ==
Key
Win
Draw
Defeat

=== 2010 ===
3 March 2010 Friendly	Nigeria	5–2	DR Congo	Abuja, Nigeria
17:30 UTC+1	Utaka 11'; Idehen 28', 65'; Ezimora 31'; Obinna 52'	Report	Bedi 47', 71'	Stadium: Abuja Stadium; Attendance: 5,000

12 March 2010 2011 CHAN qualification	Gabon	1–2	DR Congo	Libreville, Gabon
19:30 UTC+1	Lengoualama 86'	Report	Kaluyituka 24', 42'	Stadium: Stade Omar Bongo

28 March 2010 2011 CHAN qualification	DR Congo	1–1 (3–2 agg.)	Gabon	Kinshasa, Democratic Republic of Congo
20:30 UTC+1	Kaluyituka 7'	Report	Ngamé Essono 11'	Stadium: Stade des Martyrs

21 May 2010 Friendly	DR Congo	0–2	Saudi Arabia	Wattens, Austria
17:00 (UTC+2)		Report	Al-Fraidi 33'; Al-Nemri 74'	Stadium: Alpenstadion

11 August 2010 Friendly	Egypt	6–3	DR Congo	Cairo, Egypt
20:30 CAST (UTC+3)	Ali 2', 34'; Fathy 41'; Abou Trika 44'; A. Hassan I 49'; Gedo 66'	Report	Ilunga 16'; Matumona 54', 69'	Stadium: Cairo International Stadium

5 September 2010 2012 AFCONQ	DR Congo	2–4	Senegal	Lubumbashi, DR Congo
19:30 UTC+1	Kabangu 42', 71'	Report	Sow 6'; Niang 12', 22', 57' (pen.)	Stadium: Stade Frederic Kibassa Maliba; Attendance: 35,000; Referee: Djamel Hamoudi (Algeria)

9 October 2010 Friendly	Cameroon	1–1	DR Congo	Garoua, Cameroon
15:30 UTC+1	Nkulukutu 54' (o.g.)	Report	Diba Ilunga 37'	Stadium: Roumdé Adjia Stadium; Attendance: 22,000

3 March 2010 Friendly	Mali	3–1	DR Congo	Évreux, France
17:30 UTC+1	Maïga 49'; Traoré 54'; N'Diaye 74'	Report	Diba Ilunga 16'	Stadium: Stade Roger Rochard

=== 2011 ===
8 January 2011 2011 Nile Basin Tournament Group B	DR Congo	1–0	Kenya	Cairo, Egypt
14:45 (UTC+02:00)	Lofo Bongeli 27' (pen.)	Report		Stadium: Police Academy Stadium, Cairo; Referee: Denis Batte (Uganda)

11 January 2011 2011 Nile Basin Tournament Group B	Sudan	1–2	DR Congo	Cairo, Egypt
16:45 (UTC+02:00)	Muhannad Tahir 71'	Report	Matondo Salakiaku 36'; Lofo Bongeli 90' (pen.)	Stadium: Osman Ahmed Osman Stadium; Referee: Orden Mbaga (Tanzania)

14 January 2011 2011 Nile Basin Tournament Semi-final	DR Congo	0–1	Uganda	Cairo, Egypt
16:00 (UTC+02:00)		Report	Habeb Kofoma 23'	Stadium: Petro Sport Stadium; Referee: Mahmoud Ashour (Egypt)

17 January 2011 2011 Nile Basin Tournament 3rd Place Playoff	DR Congo	1–0	Kenya	Cairo, Egypt
16:45 (UTC+02:00)	Kasongo 31'	Report		Stadium: Osman Ahmed Osman Stadium; Referee: Mohamed Hussein El Fadil (Sudan)

11 January 2011 2011 CHAN Group C	DR Congo	0–2	Cameroon	Al Merreikh Stadium, Omdurman
16:45 (UTC+02:00)		Report	Momasso 42'; Baba 80'	Referee: Daniel Bennett (South Africa)

10 February 2011 2011 CHAN Group C	DR Congo	2–1	Ivory Coast	Al Merreikh Stadium, Omdurman
20:00 (UTC+02:00)	Salakiaku 18'; Kaluyituka 31'	Report	Mangoua 8'	Referee: Jose Rachide (Mozambique)

14 February 2011 2011 CHAN Group C	DR Congo	1–1	Mali	Al Merreikh Stadium, Omdurman
20:00 (UTC+02:00)	Kabangu 82'	Report	Bagayoko 80'	Referee: Mohamed Ragab Omar (Libya)

19 February 2011 2011 CHAN Quarter-finals	Tunisia	1–0	DR Congo	Khartoum Stadium, Khartoum
20:30 (UTC+02:00)	Dhaouadi 50'	Report		Referee: Koman Coulibaly (Mali)

27 March 2011 2012 AFCON Qualification	DR Congo	3–0	Mauritius	Kinshasa
15:30 UTC+1	LuaLua 28' (pen.); Matumona 48'; Diba Ilunga 61' (pen.)	Report		Stadium: Stade des Martyrs; Referee: Wokoma Solomon (Nigeria)

5 June 2011 2012 AFCON Qualification	Mauritius	1–2	DR Congo	Anjalay Stadium, Belle Vue
15:00 UTC+4	Bru 11' (pen.)	Report	Diba Ilunga 20'; Kabangu 45+1'	Attendance: 6,000; Referee: Ngosi Kalyoto (Malawi)

10 August 2011 Friendly	Gambia	3–0	DR Congo	Bakau, The Gambia
	Jaiteh 19'; Savage 24'; Ceesay 75' (pen.)	Report		Stadium: Independence Stadium (Bakau)

27 August 2011 Friendly	Angola	1–2	DR Congo	Dondo, Angola
15:00 UTC+4	Martins 13'	Report	Bakongolia 41'; Niemba 62'	Stadium: Estádio Quintalão

3 September 2011 2012 AFCON Qualification	Senegal	2–0	DR Congo	Dakar, Senegal
19:00 UTC±00:00	Sow 34', 50'	Report		Stadium: Stade Léopold Sédar Senghor, Dakar; Referee: Noumandiez Doué (Ivory Coast)

7 October 2011 2012 AFCON Qualification	DR Congo	2–3	Cameroon	Kinshasa
15:30 UTC+1	Kaluyituka 11'; Kanda 40'	Report	Eto'o 18'; Mbuta 75'; Choupo-Moting 79'	Stadium: Stade des Martyrs, Kinshasa

27 August 2011 Friendly	Lesotho	0–3	DR Congo	Pretoria, South Africa
		Report	Mputu 30'; Kanda 40'; Mihayo 82'	Stadium: High Performance Centre; Attendance: 250

11 November 2011 2014 FIFA World Cup qualification	Swaziland	1–3	DR Congo	Somhlolo National Stadium, Lobamba
16:00 UTC+2	Shongwe 63'	Report	Kaluyituka 18'; Mputu 22'; Bokese 72'	Attendance: 785; Referee: Janny Sikazwe (Zambia)

15 November 2011 2014 FIFA World Cup qualification	DR Congo	5–1	Swaziland	Stade des Martyrs, Kinshasa
15:00 UTC+4	Mputu 8', 49'; Kaluyituka 46', 61'; Diba Ilunga 66'	Report	Shongwe 63'	Attendance: 24,000; Referee: Jean Michel Moukoko (Congo)

=== 2012 ===
15 January 2012 Friendly	Oman	2–2	DR Congo	Sultan Qaboos Sports Complex, Muscat
	Al-Owaisi 8'; Al Ghilani 57'	Report	Emomo 47'; Kayiba 78' (pen.)	Attendance: 2,500

22 February 2012 Friendly	Tanzania	0–0	DR Congo	Benjamin Mkapa National Stadium, Dar es Salaam
		Report

29 February 2012 2013 Africa Cup of Nations qualification	Seychelles	0–4	DR Congo	Stade Linité, Victoria
17:30 UTC+4		Report	Kaluyituka 11', 47'; Mputu 28'; Basilua 90'	Attendance: 1,750; Referee: Aboubacar Bangoura (Guinea)

29 February 2012 Friendly	Egypt	0–0	DR Congo	Thani bin Jassim Stadium, Doha
		Report		Attendance: 1,500

2 June 2012 2014 FIFA World Cup qualification – CAF second round	Cameroon	1–0	DR Congo	Ahmadou Ahidjo Stadium, Yaoundé
15:30 UTC+1	Choupo-Moting 54' (pen.)	Report		Attendance: 10,000; Referee: Daniel Bennett (South Africa)

10 June 2012 2014 FIFA World Cup qualification – CAF second round	DR Congo	2–0	Togo	Stade des Martyrs, Kinshasa
15:30 UTC+1	Mputu 23'; Mbokani 81' (pen.)	Report		Attendance: 50,000; Referee: Mohamed Farouk Mahmoud (Egypt)

17 June 2012 2013 Africa Cup of Nations qualification	DR Congo	3–0 (7–0 agg.)	Seychelles	Stade des Martyrs, Kinshasa
15:30 UTC+1	Mbokani 38'; Issama 45'; Kanda 84'	Report		Referee: Fredrick Kayindi-Ngobi (Uganda)

9 September 2012 2013 Africa Cup of Nations qualification 2nd Round	DR Congo	4–0	Equatorial Guinea	Stade des Martyrs, Kinshasa
15:30 UTC+1	Mbokani 56', 80'; Kanda 61'; Ronan 73' (o.g.)	Report		Attendance: 20,000; Referee: Rajindraparsad Seechurn (Mauritius)

14 October 2012 2013 Africa Cup of Nations qualification 2nd Round	Equatorial Guinea	2–1 (2–5 agg.)	DR Congo	Estadio de Malabo, Malabo
18:00 UTC+1	Judson 23'; Ricardinho 35'	Report	Mulumbu 43'	Referee: Ousmane Fall (Senegal)

14 November 2012 Friendly	Burkina Faso	1–0	DR Congo	Stade El Abdi, El Jadida, Morocco
	Bancé 25' (pen.)	Report

=== 2013 ===
20 January 2013 2013 Africa Cup of Nations Group B	Ghana	2–2	DR Congo	Nelson Mandela Bay Stadium, Port Elizabeth
17:00	Agyemang-Badu 40'; Asamoah 49'	Report	Mputu 53'; Mbokani 69' (pen.)	Attendance: attendance = 7,000; Referee: Daniel Bennett (South Africa)

24 January 2013 2013 Africa Cup of Nations Group B	Niger	0–0	DR Congo	Nelson Mandela Bay Stadium, Port Elizabeth
20:00		Report		Attendance: 12,000; Referee: Bouchaïb El Ahrach (Morocco)

28 January 2013 2013 Africa Cup of Nations Group B	DR Congo	1–1	Mali	Moses Mabhida Stadium, Durban
19:00	Mbokani 3' (pen.)	Report	Mah. Samassa 15'	Attendance: 8,000; Referee: Djamel Haimoudi (Algeria)

24 March 2013 2014 FIFA World Cup qualification – CAF second round	DR Congo	0–0	Libya	Stade des Martyrs, Kinshasa
15:30 UTC+1		Report		Attendance: 53,500; Referee: William Agbovi (Ghana)

7 June 2013 2014 FIFA World Cup qualification – CAF second round	Libya	0–0	DR Congo	June 11 Stadium, Tripoli
17:30 UTC+2		Report		Attendance: 35,000; Referee: Joshua Bondo (Botswana)

16 June 2013 2014 FIFA World Cup qualification – CAF second round	DR Congo	0–0	Cameroon	Stade des Martyrs, Kinshasa
		Report		Attendance: 80,000; Referee: Badara Diatta (Senegal)

7 July 2013 2014 African Nations Championship qualification	DR Congo	2–1	Congo	Stade des Martyrs, Kinshasa
15:00	Mkundji 7'; Bokanga 72'	Report	Moubhio 28'

28 July 2013 2014 African Nations Championship qualification	Congo	1–0 (2–2 agg.)	DR Congo	Stade Denis Sassou Nguesso, Brazzaville
15:00	Kasereka 87' (o.g.)	Report

26 August 2013 2014 African Nations Championship qualification	Cameroon	0–1	DR Congo	Stade Roumdé Adjia, Garoua
		Report	Mubele 65'	Referee: Khalid Abdel Rahman (Sudan)

30 August 2013 2014 African Nations Championship qualification	DR Congo	1–1 (2–1 agg.)	Cameroon	Stade TP Mazembe, Lubumbashi
	Ebunga-Simbi 31'	Report	Ebah 60'	Referee: Youssef Essrayri (Tunisia)

8 September 2013 2014 FIFA World Cup qualification – CAF second round	Togo	2–1	DR Congo	Stade de Kégué, Lomé
15:30 UTC±0	Atakora 35'; Aloenouvo 90+3'	Report	Simbi 81'	Referee: Bouchaïb El Ahrach (Morocco)

=== 2014 ===
14 January 2014 2014 African Nations Championship Group D	DR Congo	1–0	Mauritania	Peter Mokaba Stadium, Polokwane
17:00 UTC±0	Ngoyi 51'	Report		Attendance: 6,000; Referee: Mohamed Benouza (Algeria)

18 January 2014 2014 African Nations Championship Group D	DR Congo	0–1	Gabon	Peter Mokaba Stadium, Polokwane
17:00 UTC±0		Report	N'Guema 2'	Attendance: 2,000; Referee: Joseph Lamptey (Ghana)

22 January 2014 2014 African Nations Championship Group D	Burundi	1–2	DR Congo	Peter Mokaba Stadium, Polokwane
19:00 UTC±0	Ndikumana 14'	Report	Mundele 24', 37'	Attendance: 3,500; Referee: Bamlak Tessema Weyesa (Ethiopia)

26 January 2014 2014 2014 African Nations Championship Quarter-finals	Ghana	1–0	DR Congo	Free State Stadium, Mangaung
20:30 UTC±0	Adusei 68' (pen.)	Report	Simbi 81'	Attendance: 12,000; Referee: Ali Lemghaifry (Mauritania)

6 September 2014 2015 Africa Cup of Nations qualification Group D	DR Congo	0–2	Cameroon	Stade TP Mazembe, Lubumbashi
14:00 UTC+2		Report	N'Jie 44'; Aboubakar 81'	Referee: Eric Otogo-Castane (Gabon)

10 September 2014 2015 Africa Cup of Nations qualification Group D	Sierra Leone	0–2	DR Congo	Stade TP Mazembe, Lubumbashi(DR Congo) (Note: Sierra Leone played their group stage home matches outside of the country due to the 2014 West Africa Ebola virus outbreak.)
14:00 UTC+2		Report	Mubele 51'; Bokila 88'	Referee: Youssef Essrayri (Tunisia)

11 October 2014 2015 Africa Cup of Nations qualification Group D	DR Congo	1–2	Ivory Coast	Stade Tata Raphaël, Kinshasa
15:30 UTC+1	Mongongu 68' (pen.)	Report	Bony 24'; Gradel 83'	Referee: Mehdi Abid Charef (Algeria)

15 October 2014 2015 Africa Cup of Nations qualification Group D	Ivory Coast	3–4	DR Congo	Stade Félix Houphouët-Boigny, Abidjan
17:00 UTC±0	Y. Touré 24'; Kalou 68', 72'	Report	Kebano 20'; Kabananga 34'; Bokila 36', 88'	Referee: Bakary Gassama (Gambia)

15 November 2014 2015 Africa Cup of Nations qualification Group D	Cameroon	1–0	DR Congo	Ahmadou Ahidjo Stadium, Yaoundé
15:00 UTC+1	Aboubakar 71'	Report		Referee: Joshua Bondo (Botswana)

19 November 2014 2015 Africa Cup of Nations qualification Group D	DR Congo	3–1	Sierra Leone	Stade Tata Raphaël, Kinshasa
15:00 UTC+1	Bolasie 44', 90'; Mongongu 61' (pen.)	Report	M. Kamara 27'	Referee: Hagi Wiish (Somalia)

=== 2015 ===
7 January 2015 Friendly	Cameroon	1–1	DR Congo	Ahmadou Ahidjo Stadium, Yaoundé
	Etoundi 37'	Report	Bolasie 90+3'	Attendance: 30,000

18 January 2015 2015 Africa Cup of Nations Group B	Zambia	1–1	DR Congo	Estadio de Ebibeyin, Ebibeyin
	Singuluma 2'	Report	Bolasie 66'	Attendance: 7,319; Referee: Gehad Grisha (Egypt)

22 January 2015 2015 Africa Cup of Nations Group B	Cape Verde	0–0	DR Congo	Estadio de Ebibeyin, Ebibeyin
		Report		Attendance: 7,680; Referee: Malang Diedhiou (Senegal)

22 January 2015 2015 Africa Cup of Nations Group B	DR Congo	1–1	Tunisia	Estadio de Bata, Bata
	Bokila 66'	Report	Akaïchi 31'	Attendance: 11,463; Referee: Bakary Gassama (Gambia)

31 January 2015 2015 Africa Cup of Nations Quarter-finals	Congo	2–4	DR Congo	Estadio de Bata, Bata
17:00	Doré 55'; Bifouma 62'	Report	Mbokani 65', 90+1'; Bokila 75'; Kimwaki 81'	Attendance: 31,670; Referee: Bernard Camille (Seychelles)

4 February 2015 2015 Africa Cup of Nations Semi-finals	DR Congo	1–3	Ivory Coast	Estadio de Bata, Bata
20:00	Mbokani 24' (pen.)	Report	Y. Touré 20'; Gervinho 41'; Kanon 68'	Attendance: 30,000; Referee: Néant Alioum (Cameroon)

9 June 2015 2015 Africa Cup of Nations Third place play-off	DR Congo	0–0 (4–2 p)	Equatorial Guinea	Estadio de Malabo, Malabo
19:30		Report		Attendance: 10,033; Referee: Gehad Grisha (Egypt)
	Penalties
	Mabwati (penalty scored); Mabidi (penalty scored); Mbemba (penalty scored); Mongongu (penalty scored)		(penalty missed) Balboa; (penalty missed) Fabiani; (penalty scored) Juvenal; (penalty scored) Ellong

28 March 2015 Friendly	Iraq	2–1	DR Congo	The Sevens Stadium
	Ibrahim 5'; Tariq 72'	Report	M'Poku 21' (pen.)

31 March 2015 Friendly	Iraq	1–0	DR Congo	The Sevens Stadium
	Kasim 59'	Report

31 March 2015 Friendly	DR Congo	1–1	Cameroon	Stade Charles Tondreau
	Botaka 12'	Report	Bedimo 39'	Attendance: 5,000

8 October 2015 Friendly	DR Congo	2–0	Nigeria	Stade de la Cité de l'Oie
	Mbokani 7'; Nkololo 31'	Report		Attendance: 700

12 October 2015 Friendly	DR Congo	2–1	Gabon	Stade Charles Tondreau
20:00	Botaka 3'; Mbemba 88'	Report	Madinda 51'	Attendance: 1,850

6 November 2015 Friendly	Zambia	0–3	DR Congo	Estádio 11 de Novembro, Luanda
15:00		Report	Bompunga 32' Basisila 34' Makusu 63'	Attendance: 5,000

=== 2016 ===
10 January 2016 Friendly	Rwanda	1–0	DR Congo	Umuganda Stadium, Gisenyi
18:00	Tuyisenge 49'	Report		Attendance: 5,000

17 January 2016 2016 African Nations Championship Group B	DR Congo	3–0	Ethiopia	Stade Huye, Butare
15:00	Lusadisu 44'; Luvumbu 46'; Meschak 57'	Report		Referee: Malang Diedhiou (Senegal)

21 January 2016 2016 African Nations Championship Group B	DR Congo	4–2	Angola	Stade Huye, Butare
15:00	Munganga 8'; Meschak 18'; Bolingi 38'; Bokadi 82'	Report	Gelson 75'; Kimwaki 84' (o.g.)	Referee: Ali Lemghaifry (Mauritania)

25 January 2016 2016 African Nations Championship Group B	Cameroon	3–1	DR Congo	Stade Huye, Butare
16:00	Atouba 40'; Ngamaleu 51'; Nlend 63'	Report	Mundele 47'	Attendance: 5,000; Referee: Hamada Nampiandra (Madagascar)

30 January 2016 2016 African Nations Championship Quarter-finals	Rwanda	1–2 (a.e.t.)	DR Congo	Amahoro Stadium, Kigali
15:00	Sugira 57'	Report	Gikanji 11'; Bompunga 114'	Referee: Daniel Bennett (South Africa)

3 February 2016 2016 African Nations Championship Semi-finals	DR Congo	1–1 (a.e.t.) (5–4 p)	Guinea	Amahoro Stadium, Kigali
16:00	Bolingi 102'	Report	Sankhon 120+1'	Referee: Davies Ogenche Omweno (Kenya)
	Penalties
	Kimwaki (penalty scored); Tulengi (penalty missed); Miche (penalty scored); Bolingi (penalty scored); Lomalisa (penalty missed); Gikanji (penalty scored) Meschak (penalty scored)		(penalty missed) I.S. Bangoura; (penalty scored) Sankhon; (penalty scored) Ab. Camara; (penalty missed) Thiam; (penalty scored) K. Bangoura; (penalty scored) D. Camara; (penalty missed) Youla

7 February 2016 2016 African Nations Championship final	DR Congo	3–0	Mali	Amahoro Stadium, Kigali
18:30	Meschak 29', 61'; Bolingi 73'	Report		Attendance: 25,000; Referee: Daniel Bennett (South Africa)

26 March 2016 2017 Africa Cup of Nations qualification Group B	DR Congo	2–1	Angola	Stade des Martyrs, Kinshasa
15:30 UTC+1	Bakambu 23' (pen.); Meschak 78'		Fredy 90+5' (pen.)	Referee: Joseph Lamptey (Ghana)

29 March 2016	Angola	0–2	DR Congo	Estádio 11 de Novembro, Luanda
17:00 UTC+1		Report	Kimwaki 44'; Bolingi 89'	Referee: El Fadil Mohamed (Sudan)

25 May 2016 Friendly	Romania	1–1	DR Congo	Stadio Giuseppe Sinigaglia, Como
20:00	Stanciu 27'	Report	Bokila 87'	Attendance: 1,500

5 June 2016 2017 Africa Cup of Nations qualification Group B	Madagascar	1–6	DR Congo	Rabemananjara Stadium, Mahajanga
14:30 UTC+3	Rakotondraibe 86'	Report	Bakambu 2', 81'; M'Poku 21', 65'; Bolasie 41'; Botaka 90+1'	Referee: Davies Omweno (Kenya)

19 June 2016 2016 COSAFA Cup Quarter-finals	DR Congo	1–0	Mozambique	Sam Nujoma Stadium, Windhoek
17:30	Omba 37'	Report		Referee: Victor Gomes (South Africa)

22 June 2016 2016 COSAFA Cup Semi-finals	Botswana	0–0 (5–4 p)	DR Congo	Sam Nujoma Stadium, Windhoek
15:00		Report		Referee: Helder de Carvalho (Angola)
	Penalties
	Mafoko (penalty scored); Gaolaolwe (penalty scored); Kebue (penalty scored); Sosome (penalty scored); Mogorosi (penalty scored)		(penalty scored) Mabidi; (penalty scored) Botuli; (penalty missed) Basisila; (penalty scored) Ngulubi; (penalty scored) Baometo

25 June 2016 2016 COSAFA Cup Third place play-off	Eswatini	1–0	DR Congo	Sam Nujoma Stadium, Windhoek
15:00	Ndzinisa 41'	Report		Referee: Joshua Bondo (Botswana)

4 September 2016 2017 Africa Cup of Nations qualification Group B	DR Congo	4–1	Central African Republic	Stade des Martyrs, Kinshasa
18:30 UTC+1	Kebano 29'; Mubele 46'; Bolingi 73'; Botaka 90+1'		Kéthévoama 63'	Referee: Bakary Gassama (Gambia)

4 October 2016 Friendly	DR Congo	0–1	Kenya	Stade des Martyrs, Kinshasa
18:30		Report	Olunga 66'

8 October 2016 2018 FIFA World Cup qualification – CAF third round	DR Congo	4–0	Libya	Stade des Martyrs, Kinshasa
18:30 UTC+1	Mbokani 6', 57'; Bolingi 45+2'; Mubele 68'	Report		Attendance: 71,000; Referee: Mahamadou Keita (Mali)

13 November 2016 2018 FIFA World Cup qualification – CAF third round	Guinea	1–2	DR Congo	Stade du 28 Septembre, Conakry
17:30 UTC±0	Soumah 23' (pen.)	Report	Kebano 54'; Bolasie 57'	Attendance: 30,000; Referee: Sidi Alioum (Cameroon)

=== 2017 ===
5 January 2017 Friendly	Cameroon	2–0	DR Congo
15:00	Oyongo 54' Bassogog 66'

16 January 2017 2017 Africa Cup of Nations Group C	DR Congo	1–0	Morocco	Stade d'Oyem, Oyem
20:00	Kabananga 55'	Report		Attendance: 30,000; Referee: Hamada Nampiandraza (Madagascar)

20 January 2017 2017 Africa Cup of Nations Group C	Ivory Coast	2–2	DR Congo	Stade d'Oyem, Oyem
17:00	Bony 25'; Dié 67'	Report	Kebano 10'; Kabananga 28'	Referee: Janny Sikazwe (Zambia)

24 January 2017 2017 Africa Cup of Nations Group C	Togo	1–3	DR Congo	Stade de Port-Gentil, Port-Gentil
20:00	Laba 69'	Report	Kabananga 29'; Mubele 54'; M'Poku 80'	Referee: Malang Diedhiou (Senegal)

29 January 2017 2017 Africa Cup of Nations Quarter-finals	DR Congo	1–2	Ghana	Stade d'Oyem, Oyem
17:00	M'Poku 68'	Report	J. Ayew 63' A. Ayew 78'

17 March 2017 Friendly	Kenya	2–1	DR Congo	Kenyatta Stadium, Machakos
15:00	Olunga 23' (pen.), 71'	Report	Kakuta 60'	Attendance: 5,000

10 June 2017 2019 Africa Cup of Nations qualification Group G	DR Congo	3–1	Congo	Stade des Martyrs, Kinshasa
18:30 UTC+1	Bakambu 19', 54'; Mbemba 90'	Report	Bifouma 45+1'	Attendance: 50,000; Referee: Hamada Nampiandraza (Madagascar)

11 August 2017 2018 African Nations Championship qualification – Central Zone	Congo	0–0	DR Congo	Stade Municipal de Kintélé, Brazzaville
15:30 UTC+1		Report		Referee: Jean Marc Ganamandji (Central African Republic)

19 August 2017 2018 African Nations Championship qualification – Central Zone	DR Congo	1–1 (1–1 (a) agg.)	Congo	Stade des Martyrs, Kinshasa
15:30 UTC+1	Mundele 35'	Report	Ngombe 39'	Referee: Antoine Effa (Cameroon)

1 September 2017 2018 FIFA World Cup qualification – CAF third round	Tunisia	2–1	DR Congo	Stade Olympique de Radès, Tunis
21:00 UTC+1	Meriah 18' (pen.); Chaalali 47'	Report	Bakambu 43'	Attendance: 30,000; Referee: Eric Otogo-Castane (Gabon)

5 September 2017 2018 FIFA World Cup qualification – CAF third round	DR Congo	2–2	Tunisia	Stade des Martyrs, Kinshasa
18:30 UTC+1	Mbemba 10'; M'Poku 47'	Report	Moke 77' (o.g.); Badri 78'	Attendance: 80,000; Referee: Daniel Bennett (South Africa)

7 October 2017 2018 FIFA World Cup qualification – CAF third round	Libya	1–2	DR Congo	Stade Mustapha Ben Jannet, Monastir (Tunisia)
18:00 UTC+1	Elmusrati 68'	Report	Bakambu 50'; Mubele 74'	Attendance: 750; Referee: Malang Diedhiou (Senegal)

11 November 2017 2018 FIFA World Cup qualification – CAF third round	DR Congo	3–1	Guinea	Stade des Martyrs, Kinshasa
18:30 UTC+1	Sidibé 61' (o.g.); Bolingi 90+2' (pen.); Kebano 90+3'	Report	Keita Junior 71'	Attendance: 3,000; Referee: Sidi Alioum (Cameroon)

=== 2018 ===
27 March 2018 Friendly	Tanzania	2–0	DR Congo	Benjamin Mkapa Stadium, Dar es Salaam
16:00	Samatta 75'; Kichuya 86'	Report		Attendance: 22,000

28 May 2017 Friendly	Nigeria	1–1	DR Congo	Adokiye Amiesimaka Stadium, Port Harcourt
18:30 UTC+1	Troost-Ekong 14'	Report	Malango 78' (pen.)	Attendance: 40,000

9 September 2018 2019 Africa Cup of Nations qualification Group G	Liberia	1–1	DR Congo	Samuel Kanyon Doe Sports Complex, Monrovia
16:00 UTC+0	Jebor 62'	Report	Elia 82'	Referee: Boubou Traoré (Mali)

13 October 2018 2018 FIFA World Cup qualification – CAF third round	DR Congo	1–2	Zimbabwe	Stade des Martyrs, Kinshasa
18:30 UTC+1	Bolasie 90+2'	Report	Pfumbidzai 21'; Musona 68'	Referee: Rédouane Jiyed (Morocco)

16 October 2018 2018 FIFA World Cup qualification – CAF third round	Zimbabwe	1–1	DR Congo	National Sports Stadium, Harare
19:00 UTC+2	Billiat 2'	Report	Hadebe 24' (o.g.)	Referee: Gehad Grisha (Egypt)

18 November 2018 2018 FIFA World Cup qualification – CAF third round	Congo	1–1	DR Congo	Stade Alphonse Massemba-Débat, Brazzaville
15:30 UTC+1	Bifouma 38'	Report	Kasongo 25'	Referee: Sidi Alioum (Cameroon)

=== 2019 ===
24 March 2019 2019 Africa Cup of Nations qualification Group G	DR Congo	1–0	Liberia	Stade des Martyrs, Kinshasa
14:00 UTC+1	Bakambu 52'	Report		Referee: Maguette N'Diaye (Senegal)

9 June 2019 Friendly	DR Congo	0–0	Burkina Faso	Estadio Municipal de Marbella, Marbella
17:30		Report

15 June 2019 Friendly	DR Congo	1–1	Kenya	Centro Deportivo Santa Ana, Madrid
15:30 UTC+1	Masuaku 87'	Report	Olunga 25'

22 June 2019 2019 Africa Cup of Nations Group A	DR Congo	0–2	Uganda	Cairo International Stadium, Cairo
16:30		Report	Kaddu 14'; Okwi 48'	Attendance: 1,083; Referee: Rédouane Jiyed (Morocco)

26 June 2019 2019 Africa Cup of Nations Group A	Egypt	2–0	DR Congo	Cairo International Stadium, Cairo
22:00	A. Elmohamady 25'; Salah 43'	Report		Attendance: 74,219; Referee: Victor Gomes (South Africa)

30 June 2019 2018 FIFA World Cup qualification – CAF third round	Zimbabwe	0–4	DR Congo	30 June Stadium, Cairo
15:30 UTC+1		Report	Bolingi 4'; Bakambu 34', 65' (pen.); Assombalonga 78'	Attendance: 4,364; Referee: Mustapha Ghorbal (Algeria)

7 July 2019 2019 Africa Cup of Nations Round of 16	Madagascar	2–2 (a.e.t.) (4–2 p)	DR Congo	Alexandria Stadium, Alexandria
18:00	Amada 9'; Andriatsima 77'	Report	Bakambu 21'; Mbemba 90'	Attendance: 5,890; Referee: Noureddine El Jaafari (Morocco)
	Penalties
	Amada (penalty scored); Métanire (penalty scored); Fontaine (penalty scored); Mombris (penalty scored)		(penalty missed) Tisserand; (penalty scored) Bakambu; (penalty scored) M'Poku; (penalty missed) Bolasie

18 September 2019 Friendly	DR Congo	2–3	Rwanda	Stade des Martyrs, Kinshasa
18:30	Ava Dongo 43'; Beya 87'	Report	Manzi 45+1'; Sugira 60'; Nsabimana 67'

18 November 2018 2018 FIFA World Cup qualification – CAF third round	Congo	1–1	DR Congo	Stade Alphonse Massemba-Débat, Brazzaville
15:30 UTC+1	Bifouma 38'	Report	Kasongo 25'	Referee: Sidi Alioum (Cameroon)

22 September 2019 2020 African Nations Championship qualification	Central African Republic	0–2	DR Congo	Barthélemy Boganda Stadium, Bangui
16:00 UTC+1		Report	Beya 26'; Muleka 85'	Referee: Diosdado Nzibi Nze Angono (Equatorial Guinea)

10 October 2019 Friendly	Algeria	1–1	DR Congo	Mustapha Tchaker Stadium, Blida
20:45	Slimani 6'	Report	Bakambu 26'

13 October 2019 Friendly	Ivory Coast	3–1	DR Congo	Stade de la Licorne, Amiens
19:00	Kanon 22'; Pépé 44'; Zaha 90+6'	Report	Akolo 64'

20 October 2019 2020 African Nations Championship qualification	DR Congo	4–1 (6–1 agg.)	Central African Republic	Stade des Martyrs, Kinshasa
15:30 UTC+1	Beya 13', 42'; Kikasa 28'; Muleka 60'	Report	Dimokoyen 70'	Referee: Antoine Effa Essouma (Cameroon)

14 November 2019 2021 Africa Cup of Nations qualification Group D	DR Congo	0–0	Gabon	Stade des Martyrs, Kinshasa
20:00		Report

18 November 2019 2021 Africa Cup of Nations qualification Group D	Gambia	2–2	DR Congo	Independence Stadium, Bakau
16:00 UTC+0	Jagne 52'; Jobe 90+2'	Report	Bakambu 45+3'; Muleka 75'	Referee: Norman Matemera (Zimbabwe)
