= 2016 African Nations Championship =

4th edition of CHAN

2016 Orange African Nations Championship; Championnat d'Afrique des nations de football 2016; 2016 CHAN / CHAN 2016

Tournament details
- Host country: Rwanda
- Dates: 16 January – 7 February
- Teams: 16 (from 1 confederation)
- Venues: 4 (in 3 host cities)

Final positions
- Champions: DR Congo (2nd title)
- Runners-up: Mali
- Third place: Ivory Coast
- Fourth place: Guinea

Tournament statistics
- Matches played: 32
- Goals scored: 80 (2.5 per match)
- Top scorers: (Democratic Republic of the Congo) Elia Meschak; (Nigeria) Chisom Chikatara; (Tunisia) Ahmed Akaïchi; (4 goals each)
- Best player: (Democratic Republic of the Congo) Elia Meschak
- Best goalkeeper: (Democratic Republic of the Congo) Ley Matampi
- Fair play award: DR Congo

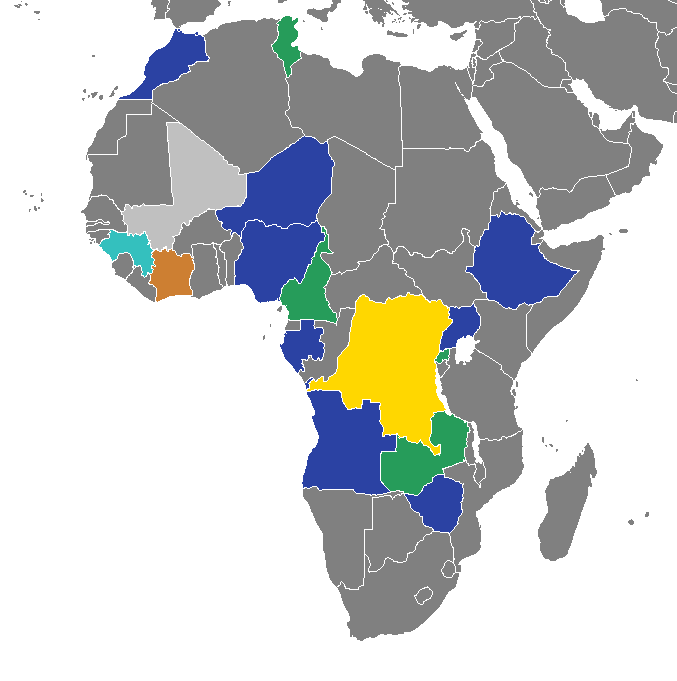
Champion Runner-up Third place Fourth place Quarter-finals Group stage

The 2016 African Nations Championship, also known for short as the 2016 CHAN and for sponsorship purposes as the Orange African Nations Championship, was the 4th edition of the biennial African association football tournament organized by CAF featuring national teams consisting of players playing in their respective national leagues. It was held in Rwanda from 16 January to 7 February 2016.

The defending champions Libya failed to qualify for this edition. It was the first edition which featured the semi-final stage consisting of the runners-up from all 4 groups and the last to be sponsored by Orange as French energy and petroleum giant Total was set to take over from the following edition onward.

== Qualification ==
Rwanda qualified automatically as hosts with the remaining spots being determined by the qualifying rounds which took place between June and October 2015.

=== Qualified teams ===
Team	Zone	Appearance	Previous best performance
Morocco	Northern Zone	2nd	Quarter-finals (2014)
Tunisia	Northern Zone	2nd	Champions (2011)
Guinea	Zone West A	1st	Debut
Mali	Zone West A	3rd	Quarter-finals (2014)
Ivory Coast	Zone West B	3rd	Group stage (2009, 2011)
Niger	Zone West B	2nd	Quarter-finals (2011)
Nigeria	Zone West B	2nd	Third place (2014)
Cameroon	Central Zone	2nd	Quarter-finals (2011)
DR Congo	Central Zone	4th	Champions (2009)
Gabon	Central Zone	3rd	Quarter-finals (2014)
Ethiopia	Central-East Zone	2nd	Group stage (2014)
Rwanda (hosts)	Central-East Zone	2nd	Group stage (2011)
Uganda	Central-East Zone	3rd	Group stage (2011, 2014)
Angola	Southern Zone	2nd	Runners-up (2011)
Zambia	Southern Zone	2nd	Third place (2009)
Zimbabwe	Southern Zone	4th	Fourth place (2014)

== Venues ==
CAF approved 4 stadiums provided by the Rwanda Football Federation.

Kigali	2016 African Nations Championship is located in Rwanda	Kigali
Amahoro Stadium	2016 African Nations Championship is located in Rwanda	Stade Régional Nyamirambo
Capacity: 30,000	2016 African Nations Championship is located in Rwanda	Capacity: 22,000
Butare	2016 African Nations Championship is located in Rwanda	Gisenyi
Stade Huye	2016 African Nations Championship is located in Rwanda	Umuganda Stadium
Capacity: 20,000	2016 African Nations Championship is located in Rwanda	Capacity: 5,000

== Squads ==
All teams consisted of a maximum of 23 players.

== Draw ==
The draw for this edition of the tournament took place on 15 November 2015, 72 hours earlier than planned, at 18:30 CAT (UTC+2), in Kigali. The 16 teams were drawn into four groups of four.

The teams were seeded based on their results in the previous 3 editions: 2009 (multiplied by 1), 2011 (multiplied by 2) and 2014 (multiplied by 3):

- 7 points for winner
- 5 points for runner-up
- 3 points for semi-finalists
- 2 points for quarter-finalists
- 1 point for group stage

Based on the formula above, the four pots were allocated as follows:

Pot 1	Pot 2	Pot 3	Pot 4
Rwanda (hosts; position A1); DR Congo; Tunisia; Zimbabwe	Angola; Nigeria; Gabon; Mali	Morocco; Uganda; Cameroon; Niger	Ethiopia; Ivory Coast; Zambia; Guinea

== Group stage ==
The top two teams of each group advanced to the knockout stage.

Tiebreakers

The teams were ranked according to points (3 points for a win, 1 point for a draw, 0 points for a loss). If tied on points, tiebreakers would be applied in the following order:

1. Number of points obtained in games between the teams concerned;
2. Goal difference in games between the teams concerned;
3. Goals scored in games between the teams concerned;
4. If, after applying criteria 1 to 3 to several teams, two teams still have an equal ranking, criteria 1 to 3 are reapplied exclusively to the matches between the two teams in question to determine their final rankings. If this procedure does not lead to a decision, criteria 5 to 7 apply;
5. Goal difference in all games;
6. Goals scored in all games;
7. Drawing of lots.

All times were local; CAT (UTC+2).

=== Group A ===
Pos	Team	Pld	W	D	L	GF	GA	GD	Pts	Qualification
1	Rwanda (H)	3	2	0	1	4	5	−1	6	Knockout stage
2	Ivory Coast	3	2	0	1	5	2	+3	6	Knockout stage
3	Morocco	3	1	1	1	4	2	+2	4	
4	Gabon	3	0	1	2	2	6	−4	1	

Source: CAFOnline.com (Archived)
Rules for classification: Group stage tiebreakers
(H) Hosts
16 January 2016
15:00

Rwanda	1–0	Ivory Coast
Bayisenge 15'	Report (Archived)

Amahoro Stadium, Kigali
Referee: Hamada Nampiandraza (Madagascar)
16 January 2016
18:00

Gabon	0–0	Morocco
	Report (Archived)

Amahoro Stadium, Kigali
Referee: Joseph Lamptey (Ghana)

20 January 2016
15:00

Rwanda	2–1	Gabon
Sugira 42', 47'	Report (Archived)	Boupendza 54'

Amahoro Stadium, Kigali
Referee: Janny Sikazwe (Zambia)
20 January 2016
18:00

Morocco	0–1	Ivory Coast
	Report (Archived)	Zakri 45' (pen.)

Amahoro Stadium, Kigali
Referee: Bamlak Tessema Weyesa (Ethiopia)

24 January 2016
16:00

Morocco	4–1	Rwanda
Mouaoui 15', 43'; Aziz 23'; Khadrouf 38'	Report (Archived)	Ngomirakiza 27'

Amahoro Stadium, Kigali
Referee: Mahamadou Keita (Mali)
24 January 2016
16:00

Ivory Coast	4–1	Gabon
Aka 18'; Djédjé 65'; Boua 76'; Blé 83'	Report (Archived)	Obambou 50'

Stade Huye, Butare
Referee: Ali Lemghaifry (Mauritania)

=== Group B ===
Pos	Team	Pld	W	D	L	GF	GA	GD	Pts	Qualification
1	Cameroon	3	2	1	0	4	1	+3	7	Knockout stage
2	DR Congo	3	2	0	1	8	5	+3	6	Knockout stage
3	Angola	3	1	0	2	4	6	−2	3	
4	Ethiopia	3	0	1	2	1	5	−4	1	

Source: CAFOnline.com (Archived)
Rules for classification: Group stage tiebreakers
17 January 2016
15:00

DR Congo	3–0	Ethiopia
Lusadisu 44'; Luvumbu 46'; Meschak 57'	Report (Archived)

Stade Huye, Butare
Referee: Malang Diedhiou (Senegal)
17 January 2016
18:00

Angola	0–1	Cameroon
	Report (Archived)	Atouba 23'

Stade Huye, Butare
Referee: Mahamadou Keita (Mali)

21 January 2016
15:00

DR Congo	4–2	Angola
Munganga 8'; Meschak 18'; Bolingi 38'; Bokadi 82'	Report (Archived)	Gelson 75'; Kimwaki 84' (o.g.)

Stade Huye, Butare
Referee: Ali Lemghaifry (Mauritania)
21 January 2016
18:00

Cameroon	0–0	Ethiopia
	Report (Archived)

Stade Huye, Butare
Referee: Denis Dembele (Ivory Coast)

25 January 2016
16:00

Cameroon	3–1	DR Congo
Atouba 40'; Ngamaleu 51'; Nlend 63'	Report (Archived)	Mundele 47'

Stade Huye, Butare
Referee: Hamada Nampiandra (Madagascar)
25 January 2016
16:00

Ethiopia	1–2	Angola
Tesfaye 74'	Report (Archived)	Papel 54', 72'

Amahoro Stadium, Kigali
Referee: Joseph Lamptey (Ghana)

=== Group C ===
Pos	Team	Pld	W	D	L	GF	GA	GD	Pts	Qualification
1	Tunisia	3	1	2	0	8	3	+5	5	Knockout stage
2	Guinea	3	1	2	0	5	4	+1	5	Knockout stage
3	Nigeria	3	1	1	1	5	3	+2	4	
4	Niger	3	0	1	2	3	11	−8	1	

Source: CAFOnline.com (archived)
Rules for classification: Group stage tiebreakers
18 January 2016
15:00

Tunisia	2–2	Guinea
Akaïchi 33', 50'	Report (Archived)	Al. Camara 40', 87'

Stade Régional Nyamirambo, Kigali
Referee: Daniel Bennett (South Africa)
18 January 2016
18:00

Nigeria	4–1	Niger
Okoro 46'; Chikatara 75', 81', 90'	Report (Archived)	Adebayor 80'

Stade Régional Nyamirambo, Kigali
Referee: Ibrahim Nour El Din (Egypt)

22 January 2016
15:00

Tunisia	1–1	Nigeria
Akaïchi 69'	Report (Archived)	Chikatara 52'

Stade Régional Nyamirambo, Kigali
Referee: Joshua Bondo (Botswana)
22 January 2016
18:00

Niger	2–2	Guinea
M. Moussa 37'; A. Moussa 49'	Report (Archived)	Sylla 38'; K. Bangoura 78'

Stade Régional Nyamirambo, Kigali
Referee: Thierry Nkurunziza (Burundi)

26 January 2016
16:00

Niger	0–5	Tunisia
	Report	Bguir 5', 39'; Akaïchi 78'; Ben Amor 80'; Essifi 90+1'

Stade Régional Nyamirambo, Kigali
Referee: Bamlak Tessema Weyasa (Ethiopia)
26 January 2016
16:00

Guinea	1–0	Nigeria
Sankhon 45'	Report

Umuganda Stadium, Gisenyi
Referee: Noureddine El Jaafari (Morocco)

=== Group D ===
Pos	Team	Pld	W	D	L	GF	GA	GD	Pts	Qualification
1	Zambia	3	2	1	0	2	0	+2	7	Knockout stage
2	Mali	3	1	2	0	3	2	+1	5	Knockout stage
3	Uganda	3	0	2	1	3	4	−1	2	
4	Zimbabwe	3	0	1	2	1	3	−2	1	

Source: CAFOnline.com (Archived)
Rules for classification: Group stage tiebreakers
19 January 2016
15:00

Zimbabwe	0–1	Zambia
	Report (Archived)	Chansa 57'

Umuganda Stadium, Gisenyi
Referee: Hudu Munyemana (Rwanda)
19 January 2016
18:00

Mali	2–2	Uganda
Koïta 23'; Sinayoko 60'	Report (Archived)	Ochaya 11'; Miya 40' (pen.)

Umuganda Stadium, Gisenyi
Referee: Mehdi Abid Charef (Algeria)

23 January 2016
15:00

Zimbabwe	0–1	Mali
	Report	Moussa Sissoko 82'

Umuganda Stadium, Gisenyi
Referee: Davies Ogenche Omweno (Kenya)
23 January 2016
18:00

Uganda	0–1	Zambia
	Report	Katongo 41'

Umuganda Stadium, Gisenyi
Referee: Juste Ephrem Zio (Burkina Faso)

27 January 2016
16:00

Uganda	1–1	Zimbabwe
Sserunkuma 90+3'	Report	Manondo 49'

Umuganda Stadium, Gisenyi
Referee: Malang Diedhiou (Senegal)
27 January 2016
16:00

Zambia	0–0	Mali
	Report

Stade Régional Nyamirambo, Kigali
Referee: Ibrahim Nour El Din (Egypt)

== Knockout stage ==
In the knockout stage, if a match was level at the end of normal playing time, extra time would be played (two periods of 15 minutes each) and followed, if necessary, by kicks from the penalty mark to determine the winner, except for the third place match where no extra time would be played.

=== Bracket ===
Quarter-finals
30 January – Kigali
Rwanda	1
DR Congo (a.e.t.)	2
31 January – Gisenyi
Zambia	0 (4)
Guinea (p)	0 (5)
31 January – Kigali
Tunisia	1
Mali	2
30 January – Butare
Cameroon	0
Ivory Coast (a.e.t.)	3

Semi-finals
3 February – Kigali
DR Congo (p)	1 (5)
Guinea	1 (4)
4 February – Kigali
Mali	1
Ivory Coast	0

Final
7 February – Kigali
DR Congo	3
Mali	0
Third place
7 February – Kigali
Guinea	1
Ivory Coast	2

=== Quarter-finals ===
30 January 2016
15:00

Rwanda	1–2 (a.e.t.)	DR Congo
Sugira 57'	Report	Gikanji 11'; Bompunga 114'

Amahoro Stadium, Kigali
Referee: Daniel Bennett (South Africa)

30 January 2016
18:00

Cameroon	0–3 (a.e.t.)	Ivory Coast
	Report	Boua 95'; Atcho 102'; N'Guessan 112'

Stade Huye, Butare
Referee: Joshua Bondo (Botswana)

31 January 2016
15:00

Tunisia	1–2	Mali
Moncer 14'	Report	Dieng 70' (pen.); Diarra 80'

Stade Régional Nyamirambo, Kigali
Referee: Hamada Nampiandraza (Madagascar)

31 January 2016
18:00

Zambia	0–0 (a.e.t.)	Guinea
	Report (Archived)
Penalties
Katongo (penalty missed); Mfune (penalty scored); Sautu (penalty scored); Kabamba (penalty missed); C. Chama (penalty scored); A. Chama (penalty scored); Musekwa (penalty missed)	4–5	(penalty scored) I.S. Bangoura; (penalty missed) Sankhon; (penalty scored) Thiam; (penalty missed) Youla; (penalty scored) I. Camara; (penalty scored) Soumah; (penalty scored) Keita

Umuganda Stadium, Gisenyi
Referee: Bamlak Tessema Weyesa (Ethiopia)

=== Semi-finals ===
3 February 2016
16:00

DR Congo	1–1 (a.e.t.)	Guinea
Bolingi 102'	Report	Sankhon 120+1'
Penalties
Kimwaki (penalty scored); Tulengi (penalty missed); Miche (penalty scored); Bolingi (penalty scored); Lomalisa (penalty missed); Gikanji (penalty scored) Meschak (penalty scored)	5–4	(penalty missed) I.S. Bangoura; (penalty scored) Sankhon; (penalty scored) Ab. Camara; (penalty missed) Thiam; (penalty scored) K. Bangoura; (penalty scored) D. Camara; (penalty missed) Youla

Amahoro Stadium, Kigali
Referee: Davies Ogenche Omweno (Kenya)

4 February 2016
16:00

Mali	1–0	Ivory Coast
Bissouma 88'	Report

Stade Régional Nyamirambo, Kigali
Referee: Ibrahim Nour El Din (Egypt)

=== Third place play-off ===
7 February 2016
15:00

Guinea	1–2	Ivory Coast
Ab. Camara 85'	Report	Youla 31' (o.g.); Badie 35'

Amahoro Stadium, Kigali
Referee: Hudu Munyemana (Rwanda)

=== Final ===
7 February 2016
18:30

DR Congo	3–0	Mali
Meschak 29', 61'; Bolingi 73'	Report (Archived)

Amahoro Stadium, Kigali
Referee: Daniel Bennett (South Africa)

== Goalscorers ==
Below is the list of goalscorers.

4 goals

- (Democratic Republic of the Congo) Elia Meschak
- (Nigeria) Chisom Chikatara
- (Tunisia) Ahmed Akaïchi

3 goals

- (Democratic Republic of the Congo) Jonathan Bolingi
- (Rwanda) Ernest Sugira

2 goals

- (Angola) Ary Papel
- (Cameroon) Yazid Atouba
- (Guinea) Alsény Camara Agogo
- (Guinea) Ibrahima Sory Sankhon
- (Ivory Coast) Koffi Boua
- (Morocco) Abdelghani Mouaoui
- (Tunisia) Saad Bguir

1 goal

- (Angola) Gelson Dala
- (Cameroon) Moumi Ngamaleu
- (Cameroon) Samuel Nlend
- (Democratic Republic of the Congo) Merveille Bokadi
- (Democratic Republic of the Congo) Botuli Bompunga
- (Democratic Republic of the Congo) Doxa Gikanji
- (Democratic Republic of the Congo) Guy Lusadisu
- (Democratic Republic of the Congo) Héritier Luvumbu
- (Democratic Republic of the Congo) Jean-Marc Makusu Mundele
- (Democratic Republic of the Congo) Nelson Munganga
- (Ethiopia) Seyoum Tesfaye
- (Gabon) Aaron Boupendza
- (Gabon) Franck Obambou
- (Guinea) Kilé Bangoura
- (Guinea) Aboubacar Leo Camara
- (Guinea) Aboubacar Iyanga Sylla
- (Ivory Coast) Essis Aka
- (Ivory Coast) Djobo Atcho
- (Ivory Coast) Gbagnon Badie
- (Ivory Coast) Treika Blé
- (Ivory Coast) Guiza Djédjé
- (Ivory Coast) Serge N'Guessan
- (Ivory Coast) Yannick Zakri
- (Mali) Yves Bissouma
- (Mali) Abdoulaye Diarra
- (Mali) Aliou Dieng
- (Mali) Sékou Koïta
- (Mali) Hamidou Sinayoko
- (Mali) Moussa Sissoko
- (Morocco) Mohamed Aziz
- (Morocco) Abdeladim Khadrouf
- (Niger) Victorien Adebayor
- (Niger) Adamou Moussa
- (Niger) Mossi Issa Moussa
- (Nigeria) Osas Okoro
- (Rwanda) Emery Bayisenge
- (Rwanda) Hegman Ngomirakiza
- (Tunisia) Mohamed Ben Amor
- (Tunisia) Hichem Essifi
- (Tunisia) Mohamed Ali Moncer
- (Uganda) Farouk Miya
- (Uganda) Joseph Ochaya
- (Uganda) Geofrey Serunkuma
- (Zambia) Isaac Chansa
- (Zambia) Christopher Katongo
- (Zimbabwe) William Manondo

1 own goal

- (Democratic Republic of the Congo) Joël Kimwaki (against Angola)
- (Guinea) Mohamed Youla (against Ivory Coast)

== Awards ==
Below is the list of awards.

- Best Player: Elia Meschak (DR Congo)
- Top scorer: Elia Meschak (DR Congo): 4 goals and two assist
- Goal of the Tournament: Serge N'Guessan (Côte d’Ivoire) against Cameroon
- Fair Play Trophy: DR Congo
- Best XI
  - Goalkeeper: Ley Matampi (DR Congo)
  - Defenders: Abdoul Karim Danté (Mali), Joël Kimwaki (DR Congo), Cheick Ibrahim Comara (Côte d’Ivoire), Mohamed Youla (Guinea)
  - Midfielders: Ibrahima Sory Sankhon (Guinea), Mechack Elia (DR Congo), N’Guessan Serge (Côte d’Ivoire), Hamidou Sinayoko (Mali)
  - Forwards: Jonathan Bolingi (DR Congo), Sekou Koïta (Mali)
  - Substitutes: Badra Ali Sangaré (Côte d’Ivoire), Djigui Diarra (Mali), Lomalisa Mutambala (DR Congo), Heritier Luvumbu (DR Congo), Daouda Camara (Guinea), Aka Essis (Côte d’Ivoire), Ernest Sugira (Rwanda), Ahmed Akaïchi (Tunisia), Elvis Chisom Chikataba (Nigeria), Christopher Katongo (Zambia)

== Final ranking ==
Below is the final ranking.

1. DR Congo
2. Mali
3. Ivory Coast
4. Guinea
5. Zambia
6. Cameroon
7. Rwanda
8. Tunisia
9. Nigeria
10. Morocco
11. Angola
12. Uganda
13. Zimbabwe
14. Gabon
15. Ethiopia
16. Niger
