= Koffi Boua =

Ivorian footballer

Personal information
- Full name: Koffi Davy Mahinde Boua
- Date of birth: 20 September 1986 (age 40)
- Place of birth: Bouaké, Ivory Coast
- Height: 1.83 m (6 ft 0 in)
- Position: Forward

Senior career*
Years	Team	Apps	(Gls)
2010–2014	ASEC Mimosas		
2014–2016	AS Tanda		
2016–2018	MAS Fez		
2018–2020	Olympic Safi	45	(17)
2020–2021	Al-Rawdhah		

International career
2013–2016	Ivory Coast	9	(3)
- * Club domestic league appearances and goals

Koffi Davy Mahinde Boua (born 20 September 1986) is an Ivorian former professional footballer who played as a forward.

== Career ==
Boua played for ASEC Mimosas, where he won his first trophy in his first season in Ligue 1 in 2010. He was then twice a runner up in Ligue 1 in 2012–13 and 2014–15. He left during the 2015–16 season and signed for MAS Fez, playing alongside Guiza Djédjé, who also left from the Ligue 1 in Ivory Coast.

== Career statistics ==
Scores and results list Ivory Coast's goal tally first, score column indicates score after each Boua goal.

List of international goals scored by Koffi Boua
No.	Date	Venue	Opponent	Score	Result	Competition
1	30 October 2015	Stade Robert Champroux, Abidjan, Ivory Coast	Ghana	1–0	1–0	2016 African Nations Championship qualification
2	24 January 2016	Stade Huye, Butare, Rwanda	Gabon	3–1	4–1	2016 African Nations Championship
3	30 January 2016	Stade Huye, Butare, Rwanda	Cameroon	1–0	3–0 (a.e.t.)	2016 African Nations Championship

== Honours ==
ASEC

- Ligue 1: 2010; runner-up 2012–13, 2014–15
