= Serge N'Guessan =

Ivorian footballer

Personal information
- Full name: Serge Yao N'Guessan
- Date of birth: 17 December 1994 (age 31)
- Place of birth: Abidjan, Ivory Coast
- Height: 1.65 m (5 ft 5 in)
- Position: Midfielder

Team information
- Current team: Beauvais
- Number: 6

Senior career*
Years	Team	Apps	(Gls)
–2016	AFAD Djékanou		
2016–2021	Nancy	52	(0)
2016–2019	Nancy II	14	(0)
2022–	Beauvais	57	(0)

International career
2015–2017	Ivory Coast	14	(2)
- * Club domestic league appearances and goals as of 6 December 2024

Serge Yao N'Guessan (born 31 July 1994 or 17 December 1994) is an Ivorian professional footballer who plays as a midfielder for French Championnat National 1 club Beauvais.

== Career statistics ==
=== International ===
Appearances and goals by national team and year
National team	Year	Apps	Goals
Ivory Coast	2015	2	0
Ivory Coast	2016	11	1
Ivory Coast	2017	1	1
Total		14	2

Scores and results list Ivory Coast's goal tally first, score column indicates score after each N'Guessan goal.

List of international goals scored by Serge N'Guessan
No.	Date	Venue	Opponent	Score	Result	Competition
1	30 January 2016	Stade Huye, Butare, Rwanda	Cameroon	3–0	3–0 (a.e.t)	2016 African Nations Championship
2	8 January 2017	Zayed Sports City Stadium, Abu Dhabi, United Arab Emirates	Sweden	1–1	2–1	Friendly
