= Djobo Atcho =

Ivorian footballer

Personal information
- Full name: Djobo Atcho
- Date of birth: 30 January 1988 (age 38)
- Place of birth: Côte d'Ivoire
- Height: 1.63 m (5 ft 4 in)
- Position: Forward

International career^{‡}
Years	Team	Apps	(Gls)
2015–	Ivory Coast	6	(1)
- ‡ National team caps and goals as of 15:14, 11 February 2016 (UTC)

Djobo Atcho (born 30 January 1988) is an Ivorian footballer who plays as a forward.

== International career ==
=== International goals ===
Scores and results list Ivory Coast's goal tally first.

No	Date	Venue	Opponent	Score	Result	Competition
1.	30 January 2016	Stade Huye, Butare, Rwanda	Cameroon	2–0	3–0 (a.e.t.)	2016 African Nations Championship
