= Treika Blé =

Ivorian footballer

Personal information
- Full name: Nilmar Treika Mondesir Blé
- Date of birth: 26 February 1992 (age 34)
- Place of birth: Côte d'Ivoire
- Position: Midfielder

International career^{‡}
Years	Team	Apps	(Gls)
2016–	Ivory Coast	6	(1)
- ‡ National team caps and goals as of 26 December 2016

Treika Blé (born 26 February 1992) is an Ivorian footballer who plays as a midfielder.

== International career ==
=== International goals ===
Scores and results list Ivory Coast's goal tally first.

No	Date	Venue	Opponent	Score	Result	Competition
1.	24 January 2016	Stade Huye, Butare, Rwanda	Gabon	4–1	4–1	2016 African Nations Championship
