= Ernest Sugira =

Rwandan football player (born 1991)

Personal information
- Date of birth: 27 March 1991 (age 35)
- Place of birth: Kigali, Rwanda
- Height: 1.98 m (6 ft 6 in)
- Position: Forward

Team information
- Current team: Al-Wahda SC
- Number: 16

Senior career*
Years	Team	Apps	(Gls)
2012–2013	AS Muhanga	29	(17)
2013–2014	A.P.R.	6	(2)
2014–2016	AS Kigali	64	(29)
2016	AS Vita Club	19	(12)
2017–2019	A.P.R.	16	(7)
2020–2021	Rayon Sports	26	(13)
2021–2022	AS Kigali	20	(11)
2022–2023	Al-Wahda SC	24	(15)
2024-	Kiyovu Sports		

International career^{‡}
2013–	Rwanda	72	(14)
- * Club domestic league appearances and goals as of 12 February 2016 ‡ National team caps and goals as of 19 October 2019

Ernest Sugira (born March 27, 1991) is a Rwandan professional footballer who plays as a forward for Al-Wahda SC and the Rwanda national team.

== Career ==
He began his youth career as a midfielder at AS Muhanga at an early age and led to a Rwandan cup final with the club. In June 2013 he joined Armée Patriotique Rwandaise F.C. In March 2014, he scored a goal in a rout of Amavubi Stars 4-0 in the 2013–14 Rwanda National Football League Also, in the Rwandan Cup also known as Peace cup, he missed a penalty in a penalty shootout against his former club AS Muhanga but despite that, his team won 10-9 to advance to the next round. With Armée Patriotique Rwandaise F.C., he won a double in the season 2013-2014 Rwandan Football season. In September 2014, Sugira signed to AS Kigali among with two other APR FC players to join the club. In the Rwamagana pre season tournament, he scored a goal in a semifinal against Mukura Victory Sports FC and ultimately won the trophy in the final against the host Sunrise FC. Then in December 2014, he won yet another trophy in the Ombudsman cup final against Police FC.

In May 2016, Ernest Sugira signed with AS Vita Club, a Democratic Republic of Congo's club, and joined the club for a two years contract.

== International career ==
Ernest Sugira made his debut for Rwanda at the age of 22 against Benin in September 2013 for the 2014 FIFA World Cup qualification match. He scored his first international goal against the Mozambique national football team in 2017 Africa Cup of Nations qualifier in Maputo. In January 2016, he played the 2016 African Nations Championship in Rwanda and scored 3 goals in 4 matches. He led Rwanda to the knock-out stages of a major competition for the first time in their history by scoring a brace against the Gabon national football team. He was eventually named the Man of the match. Although he found the back of the net again as Rwanda national football team played its quarter final match against the DR Congo national football team, it did not suffice as the host went on to lose 2-1 in extra time. However, Ernest Sugira was included in the team of the tournament. On 26 January 2021 in CAMEROON, LIMBE stadium; SUGIRA scored a brace in 3-2 win against TOGO in the last match of group stage of 2021 African Nations championship and for another time SUGIRA qualified his native country to the quarter-final of the tournament.

=== International goals ===
Scores and results list Rwanda's goal tally first.

No.	Date	Venue	Opponent	Score	Result	Competition
1.	14 June 2015	Estádio do Zimpeto, Maputo, Mozambique	Mozambique	1–0	1–0	2017 Africa Cup of Nations qualification
2.	28 August 2015	Amahoro Stadium, Kigali, Rwanda	Ethiopia	1–0	3–1	Friendly
3.	20 January 2016	Amahoro Stadium, Kigali, Rwanda	Gabon	2–0	2–1	2016 African Nations Championship
4.	30 January 2016	Amahoro Stadium, Kigali, Rwanda	DR Congo	1–1	1–2	2016 African Nations Championship
5.	29 March 2016	Amahoro Stadium, Kigali, Rwanda	Mauritius	2–0	5–0	2017 Africa Cup of Nations qualification
8.	11 June 2017	Barthélemy Boganda Stadium, Bangui, Central African Republic	Central African Republic	1–1	1–2	2019 Africa Cup of Nations qualification
9.	18 September 2019	Stade des Martyrs, Kinshasa, DR Congo	DR Congo	1	3–2	Friendly
10.	22 September 2019	Tigray Stadium, Mekelle, Ethiopia	Ethiopia	1–0	1–0	2020 African Nations Championship qualification
11.	19 October 2019	Stade Régional Nyamirambo, Kigali, Rwanda	Ethiopia	1–1	1–1	2020 African Nations Championship qualification
12.	12 November 2020	Stade de la Réunification, Douala, Cameroon	Togo	1–0	1–0	2021 Africa Cup of Nations qualification
