= Essis Aka =

Ivorian footballer

Personal information
- Full name: Essis Baudelaire Fulgence Aka
- Date of birth: 10 January 1990 (age 36)
- Place of birth: Dabou, Ivory Coast
- Height: 1.68 m (5 ft 6 in)
- Position: Midfielder

Team information
- Current team: ASEC Mimosas
- Number: 19

International career^{‡}
Years	Team	Apps	(Gls)
2016–	Ivory Coast	13	(1)
- ‡ National team caps and goals as of 22 January 2018

Essis Baudelaire Fulgence Aka (born 10 January 1990) is an Ivorian professional footballer who plays as a midfielder for ASEC Mimosas.

== International career ==
=== International goals ===
Scores and results list Ivory Coast's goal tally first.

No	Date	Venue	Opponent	Score	Result	Competition
1.	24 January 2016	Stade Huye, Butare, Rwanda	Gabon	1–0	4–1	2016 African Nations Championship
