= Gbagnon Badie =

Ivorian footballer

Personal information
- Full name: Gbagnon Anicet Badie
- Date of birth: 5 October 1992 (age 34)
- Place of birth: Côte d'Ivoire
- Height: 1.73 m (5 ft 8 in)
- Position: Midfielder

Team information
- Current team: ASEC Mimosas
- Number: 8

Senior career*
Years	Team	Apps	(Gls)
2008–2017	AFAD Djékanou		
2017	Mouloudia		
2018–	ASEC Mimosas		

International career^{‡}
2016–	Ivory Coast	4	(1)
- * Club domestic league appearances and goals ‡ National team caps and goals as of 07:17, 26 December 2016 (UTC)

Gbagnon Badie (born 5 October 1992) is an Ivorian footballer who plays as a midfielder.

== International career ==
=== International goals ===
Scores and results list the Ivory Coast's goal tally first.

No	Date	Venue	Opponent	Score	Result	Competition
1.	7 February 2016	Amahoro Stadium, Kigali, Rwanda	Guinea	2–0	2–1	2016 African Nations Championship
