= Aboubacar Leo Camara =

Guinean international footballer

Personal information
- Date of birth: 1 January 1993 (age 33)
- Place of birth: Conakry, Guinea
- Height: 1.85 m (6 ft 1 in)
- Position: Defender

Senior career*
Years	Team	Apps	(Gls)
2013–2014	Satellite FC		
2014–2015	Hafia FC		
2015–2017	AS Kaloum		
2017	PS TNI	3	(0)
2017–2020	Ansar	10	(0)
2020–2021	Kahrabaa		
2021–2022	Karbala		
2022–2023	Al-Talaba		
2023–2024	Al-Ittihad Aleppo		
2024	Al-Dahab		

International career^{‡}
2016–	Guinea	5	(1)
- * Club domestic league appearances and goals as of 29 April 2017 ‡ National team caps and goals as of 18 July 2016

Aboubacar Leo Camara (born 1 January 1993) is a Guinean international footballer who last played as a defender.

== International career ==
His last international match for Guinea national football team occurred on 7 February 2016 in which he scored one goal against Ivory Coast national football team.

== Career statistics ==
=== International goals ===
Scores and results list Guinea's goal tally first.

No	Date	Venue	Opponent	Score	Result	Competition
1.	31 January 2016	Amahoro Stadium, Kigali, Rwanda	Ivory Coast	1–2	1–2	2016 African Nations Championship

== Honours ==
=== Club ===
Ansar

- Lebanese Premier League runner up: 2018–19
- Lebanese FA Cup runner-up: 2018–19
- Lebanese Super Cup runner-up: 2017
