= Youla =

Youla is a surname. Notable people with the surname include:

- Benjamin Youla (born 1975), Republic of the Congo sprinter
- Dante C. Youla (1925–2021), American engineer
- Mamady Youla (born 1961), Guinean businessman
- Mohamed Youla (born 1996), Guinean footballer
- Souleymane Youla (born 1981), Guinean footballer

Fictional characters with this name include:

- Eula (Chinese: 优菈, Pinyin: Yōulā), a Genshin Impact character
