= Aboubacar Sylla (footballer, born 1993) =

Guinean footballer

Personal information
- Full name: Aboubacar Sylla
- Date of birth: 1 May 1993 (age 33)
- Place of birth: Guinea
- Height: 1.69 m (5 ft 7 in)
- Position: Midfielder

Senior career*
Years	Team	Apps	(Gls)
2014–2017	AS Kaloum		
2017	PS TNI	3	(0)

International career^{‡}
2015–	Guinea	8	(2)
- * Club domestic league appearances and goals as of 29 April 2017 ‡ National team caps and goals as of 30 May 2018

Aboubacar "Iyanga" Sylla (born 1 May 1993) is a Guinean international football midfielder.

He took his nickname from Equatoguinean footballer Iban Iyanga, who scored a goal against Senegal (Guinea's classic rival) at the 2012 Africa Cup of Nations.

== International career ==
=== International goals ===
Scores and results list Guinea's goal tally first.

No	Date	Venue	Opponent	Score	Result	Competition
1.	17 October 2015	Stade du 26 Mars, Bamako, Mali	Senegal	2–0	2–0	2016 African Nations Championship qualification
2.	22 January 2016	Stade Régional Nyamirambo, Kigali, Rwanda	Niger	1–1	2–2	2016 African Nations Championship
