= Adamou Moussa =

Nigerien footballer

Personal information
- Full name: Adamou Moussa Issa
- Date of birth: 1 January 1995 (age 31)
- Place of birth: Niger
- Height: 1.81 m (5 ft 11 in)
- Position: Forward

Team information
- Current team: Saint-Josse

Senior career*
Years	Team	Apps	(Gls)
2013–2015	Olympic FC Niamey		
2015–2017	AS FAN		
2017–2018	US Musulmane d'Oujda		
2018	AS Douanes		
2018–2019	Flamurtari		
2019–2020	AS FAN		
2020–2021	AS SONIDEP		
2021–2022	Al-Taqadom		
2022–2023	Al-Sadd		
2023–	Saint-Josse		

International career^{‡}
2016–	Niger	4	(1)
- * Club domestic league appearances and goals ‡ National team caps and goals as of 16:29, 24 January 2016 (UTC)

Adamou Moussa (born 1 January 1995) is a Nigerien international footballer plays for Saint-Josse.

== International career ==
=== International goals ===
Scores and results list Niger's goal tally first.

No	Date	Venue	Opponent	Score	Result	Competition
1.	22 January 2016	Stade Régional Nyamirambo, Kigali, Rwanda	Guinea	2–1	2–2	2016 African Nations Championship
