= Kilé Bangoura =

Guinean footballer

Personal information
- Full name: Aboubacar Kilé Bangoura
- Date of birth: 7 July 1994 (age 32)
- Place of birth: Guinea
- Height: 1.75 m (5 ft 9 in)
- Position: Forward

Senior career*
Years	Team	Apps	(Gls)
2013–2014	CI Kamsar		
2014–2015	Soumba		(13)
2015–2017	Horoya		(11+)
2017–2019	Gangan		
2019–2020	Kaloum Star		
2020–2021	Hafia		
2021–2022	Ted Afrique Ratoma		(17)
2022–2023	Sangarédi		

International career^{‡}
2015–2017	Guinea	9	(3)
- * Club domestic league appearances and goals ‡ National team caps and goals as of 16:37, 5 March 2017 (UTC)

Kilé Bangoura (born 7 July 1994) is a Guinean former footballer.

== International career ==
=== International goals ===
Scores and results list Guinea's goal tally first.

No	Date	Venue	Opponent	Score	Result	Competition
1.	5 July 2015	Antoinette Tubman Stadium, Monrovia, Liberia	Liberia	1–1	1–1	2016 African Nations Championship qualification
2.	24 October 2015	Stade Demba Diop, Dakar, Senegal	Senegal	1–0	1–3	2016 African Nations Championship qualification
3.	22 January 2016	Stade Régional Nyamirambo, Kigali, Rwanda	Niger	1–1	2–2	2016 African Nations Championship
