= Osas Okoro =

Nigerian footballer

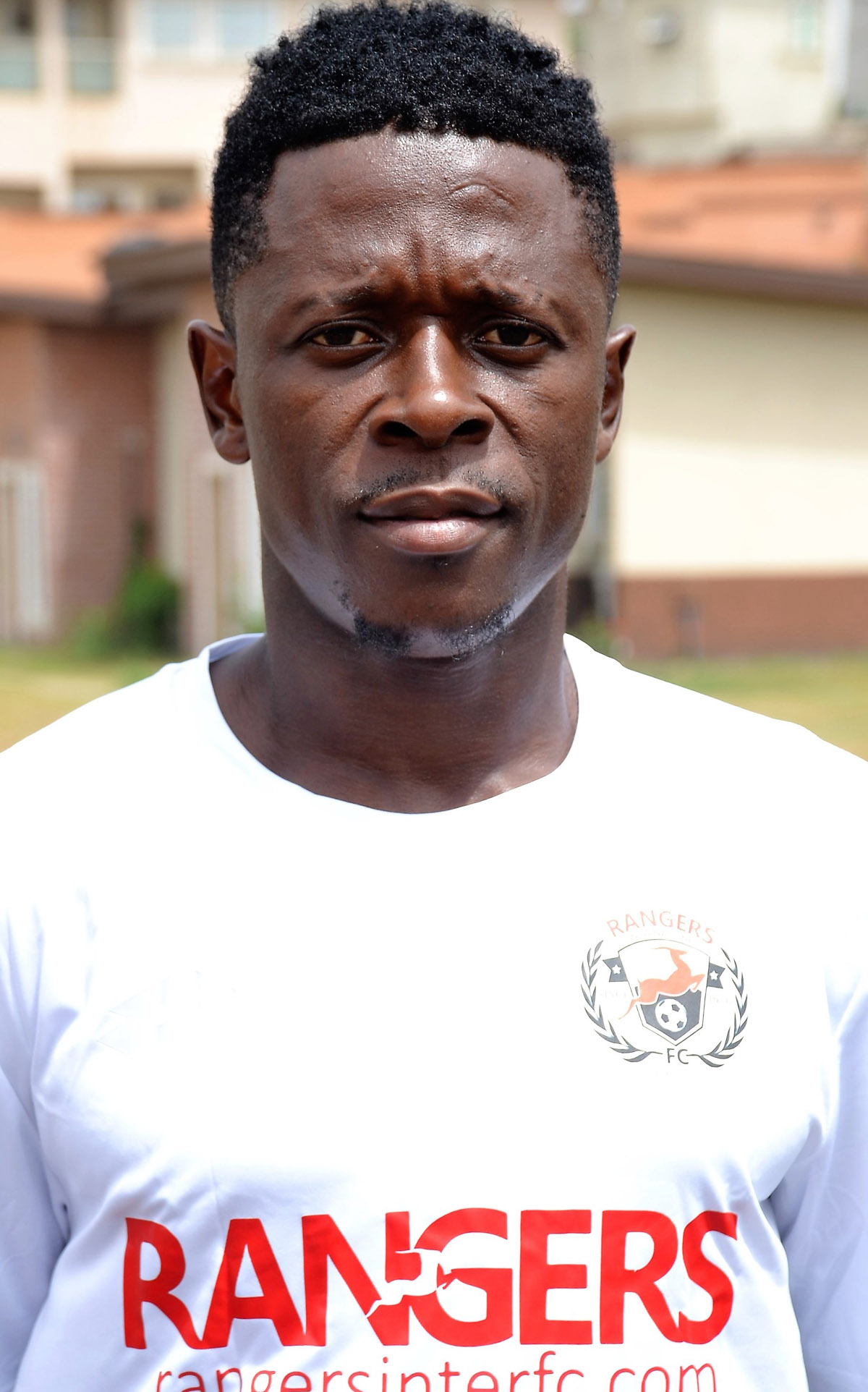

Personal information
- Full name: Osadebamwen Moses Okoro
- Date of birth: 7 September 1990 (age 36)
- Position: Midfielder

Team information
- Current team: Enugu Rangers

Senior career*
Years	Team	Apps	(Gls)
2008–2010	Bayelsa United		
2010–2015	Heartland		
2015–2018	Enugu Rangers		
2018–2019	Buildcon		
2019–	Enugu Rangers		

International career^{‡}
2011–	Nigeria	14	(1)
- * Club domestic league appearances and goals as of 19:52, 10 April 2016 (UTC) ‡ National team caps and goals as of 19:52, 29 May 2018 (UTC)

Osadebamwen Moses Okoro (born 7 September 1990) is a Nigerian international footballer who plays for Enugu Rangers, as a midfielder.

== Personal life ==
Okoro's brothers, Stanley and Charles, are also footballers.

== Club career ==
Okoro has played club football in Nigeria for Bayelsa United, Heartland and Enugu Rangers.

In December 2016, he was crowned the Edo Footballer of the Year by the Edo FA

== International career ==
He made his international debut for Nigeria in 2011. He was named in the Nigerian team for the 2011 CAF U-23 Championship and 2016 African Nations Championship.

=== International goals ===
Scores and results list Nigeria's goal tally first.

No	Date	Venue	Opponent	Score	Result	Competition
1.	18 January 2016	Stade Régional Nyamirambo, Kigali, Rwanda	Niger	1–0	4–1	2016 African Nations Championship
