= Daniel Bakongolia =

Congolese footballer (born 1987)

Personal information
- Full name: Daniel Bakongolia Bosenge Zibangwana
- Date of birth: 3 March 1987 (age 39)
- Place of birth: Kinshasa, Zaire
- Height: 1.81 m (5 ft 11 in)
- Position: Forward

Senior career*
Years	Team	Apps	(Gls)
2003	TS Malekesa		
2004	AS Vita Club		
2005	SM Sanga Balende		
2006	TP Mazembe		
2007	Debreceni VSC II		
2008	FC Zlaté Moravce	7	(0)
2009	Marila Příbram	1	(0)
2009–2011	FC Zlaté Moravce		
2011–2012	TS Malekesa		
2013	Recreativo Caála		
2014	DC Motema Pembe		

International career
2011	Democratic Republic of the Congo	2	(1)
- * Club domestic league appearances and goals

Daniel Bakongolia (born 3 March 1987) is a Congolese former footballer who played as a striker.
