= Stade Lumumba =

Coordinates: 0.52121600°N 25.18657600°E

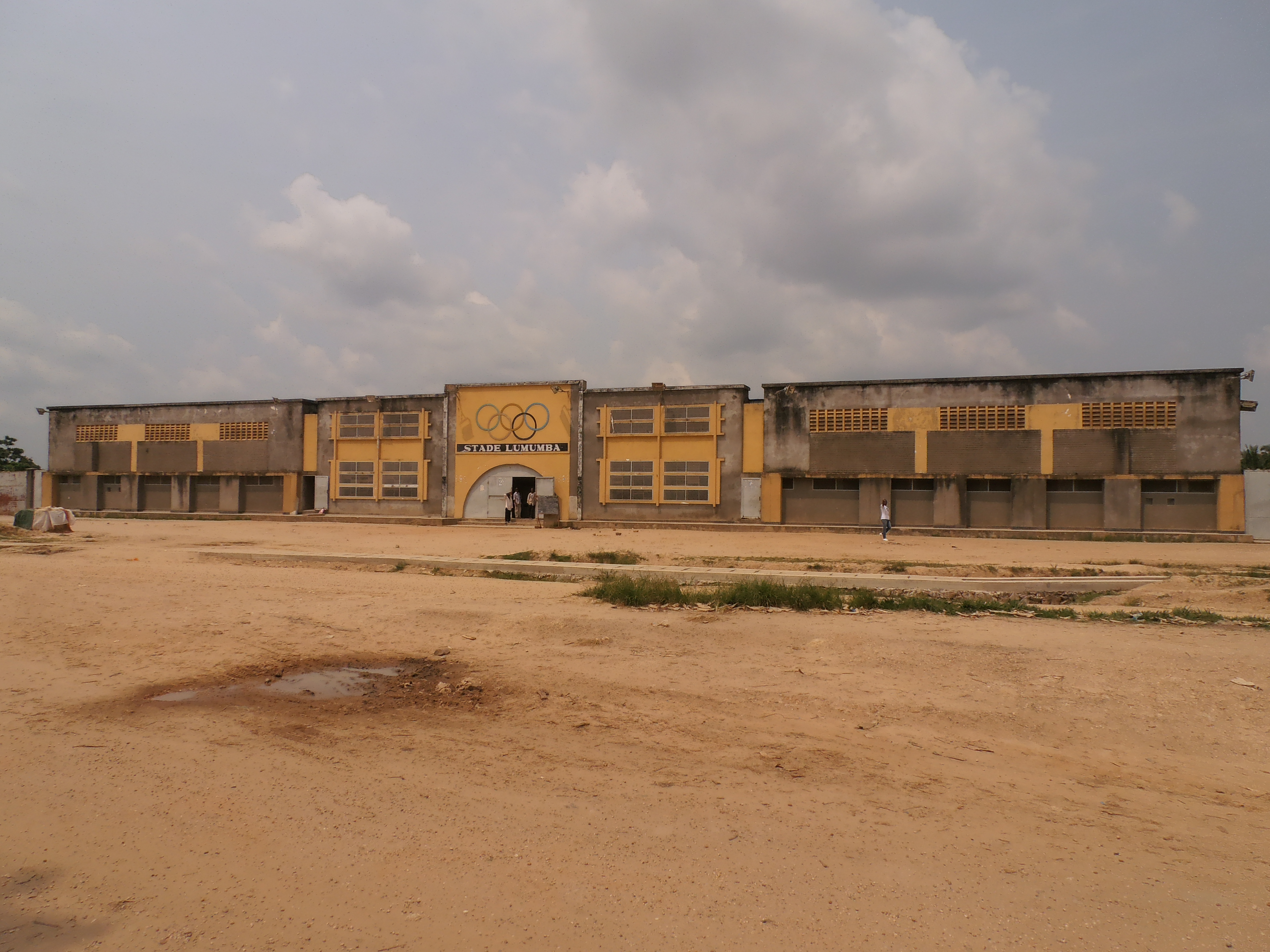
- Interactive map of Stade Lumumba
- Location: (Democratic Republic of the Congo) Kisangani, Congo DR
- Capacity: 10,000

Tenants
- AS Nika, TS Malekesa and AS Makiso

Stade Lumumba is a stadium located in Kisangani, Democratic Republic of the Congo. It has a capacity of 10,000 spectators for football matches. It serves as the home of AS Nika, TS Malekesa and AS Makiso of the Linafoot.
