= Doxa Gikanji =

Congolese footballer

Personal information
- Full name: Doxa Gikanji
- Date of birth: 21 August 1990 (age 36)
- Place of birth: Zaire
- Height: 1.74 m (5 ft 9 in)
- Position: Midfielder

International career^{‡}
Years	Team	Apps	(Gls)
2015–	DR Congo	13	(1)
- ‡ National team caps and goals as of 30 May 2018

Doxa Gikanji (born 21 August 1990) is a Congolese professional footballer who plays as a midfielder.

== International career ==
=== International goals ===
Scores and results list DR Congo's goal tally first.

No	Date	Venue	Opponent	Score	Result	Competition
1.	30 January 2016	Amahoro Stadium, Kigali, Rwanda	Rwanda	1–0	2–1 (a.e.t.)	2016 African Nations Championship
