= Guiza Djédjé =

Ivorian footballer

Personal information
- Full name: Franck Guiza Djédjé
- Date of birth: 2 November 1995 (age 31)
- Place of birth: Gagnoa, Ivory Coast
- Height: 1.75 m (5 ft 9 in)
- Position: Forward

Team information
- Current team: MAS Fez
- Number: 11

Senior career*
Years	Team	Apps	(Gls)
2012–2016	Séwé Sport		
2016–	MAS Fez	120	(71)

International career^{‡}
2016	Ivory Coast	6	(1)
- * Club domestic league appearances and goals as of 07:38, 9 February 2016 (UTC) ‡ National team caps and goals as of 07:38, 9 February 2016 (UTC)

Guiza Djédjé (born 2 November 1995) is an Ivorian footballer who plays as a forward for MAS Fez in Morocco.

== International career ==
=== International goals ===
Scores and results list Ivory Coast's goal tally first.

No	Date	Venue	Opponent	Score	Result	Competition
1.	24 January 2016	Stade Huye, Butare, Rwanda	Gabon	2–1	4–1	2016 African Nations Championship

== Honours ==
Séwé Sport

Winner

- Ligue 1 (2): 2012–13, 2013–14

Runner-up

- CAF Confederation Cup: 2014

MAS Fez Winner

- Coupe du Trône: 2016
