= Botuli Bompunga =

Congolese professional footballer

Personal information
- Full name: Botuli Padou Bompunga
- Date of birth: 30 January 1992 (age 34)
- Place of birth: Zaire
- Position: Defender

Senior career*
Years	Team	Apps	(Gls)
2014	CARA Brazzaville		
2014–2019	AS Vita Club		
2019–2020	MC Oujda	20	(0)
2021	Saham		
2021	Al-Hussein		
2022–2025	AS Simba		
2025	Al-Sareeh	3	(0)

International career^{‡}
2019–2020	DR Congo	20	(2)
- * Club domestic league appearances and goals ‡ National team caps and goals as of 30 May 2018

Botuli Bompunga is a Congolese professional footballer who plays as a defender.

== International career ==
=== International goals ===
Scores and results list DR Congo's goal tally first.

No	Date	Venue	Opponent	Score	Result	Competition
1.	6 November 2015	Estádio 11 de Novembro, Luanda, Angola	Zambia	1–0	3–0	Friendly
2.	30 January 2016	Amahoro Stadium, Kigali, Rwanda	Rwanda	2–1	2–1 (a.e.t.)	2016 African Nations Championship
