= William Manondo =

Zimbabwean footballer (born 1991)

Personal information
- Full name: William Manondo
- Date of birth: 2 April 1991 (age 35)
- Place of birth: Zimbabwe
- Position: Forward

Team information
- Current team: CAPS United

Senior career*
Years	Team	Apps	(Gls)
2011	Kiglon Bird		
2011–2013	Platinum		
2012	→ Gunners (loan)		
2013–2021	Harare City		
2022–	CAPS United	1	(1)

International career^{‡}
2016	Zimbabwe	2	(1)
- * Club domestic league appearances and goals ‡ National team caps and goals as of 14 November 2020

William Manondo (born 2 April 1991) is a Zimbabwean footballer who plays as a forward for CAPS United and the Zimbabwe national team.

== Playing career ==
=== Club ===
Manondo started his career with Zimbabwe Premier Soccer League side Platinum, during his time with Platinum he was sent out on loan to Gunners in 2012 before being recalled in July of the same year. He spent one more year with Platinum after returning from his loan spell until he departed in 2013 to join Harare City.

Nicknamed Mr. Chibuku, he joined CAPS United in January 2022 after his contract with Harare City expired.

=== International ===
In 2016, Madondo made his debut for the Zimbabwe national team against Mali in a 2016 African Nations Championship match, one that ended in defeat for Zimbabwe. He played in Zimbabwe's final group fixture against Uganda and scored his first international goal in a 1–1 draw.

== Career statistics ==
=== International ===
As of 19 June 2016.

National team	Year	Apps	Goals
Zimbabwe	2016	2	1
Total		2	1

=== International goals ===
As of 19 June 2016. Scores and results list Zimbabwe's goal tally first.

Goal	Date	Venue	Opponent	Score	Result	Competition
1	27 January 2016	Umuganda Stadium, Gisenyi, Rwanda	Uganda	1–0	1–1	2016 African Nations Championship

== Honours ==
=== Club ===
Platinum

- Zimbabwean Independence Trophy (1): 2012
