= Guy Lusadisu =

Congolese footballer (born 1982)

Personal information
- Full name: Guy Lusadisu Basisila
- Date of birth: 28 December 1982 (age 43)
- Place of birth: Kinshasa, Zaïre
- Height: 1.75 m (5 ft 9 in)
- Position: Midfielder

Senior career*
Years	Team	Apps	(Gls)
–2005	SC Cilu		
2006–2007	TP Mazembe		
2007–2008	CS Sfaxien		
2008	TP Mazembe		
2008–2009	APR FC		
2009–2012	TP Mazembe		
2012–2014	AS Mangasport		
2014–2017	AS Vita Club		

International career^{‡}
2007–2016	DR Congo	16	(2)

Managerial career
- 2019–: AS Maniema Union
- * Club domestic league appearances and goals as of 2017 ‡ National team caps and goals as of 2017

Guy Lusadisu (born 28 December 1982) is a Congolese professional footballer. He last played as a midfielder for AS Vita Club.

In February 2019 he was named as manager of AS Maniema Union.

== International career ==
=== International goals ===
Scores and results list DR Congo's goal tally first.

No	Date	Venue	Opponent	Score	Result	Competition
1.	6 November 2015	Estádio 11 de Novembro, Luanda, Angola	Zambia	2–0	3–0	Friendly
2.	17 January 2016	Stade Huye, Butare, Rwanda	Ethiopia	1–0	3–0	2016 African Nations Championship

== Honours ==
AS Vita Club

- Linafoot: 2014–15
- CAF Champions League runner-up: 2014

TP Mazembe

- Linafoot: 2011, 2012
- CAF Champions League: 2009, 2010
- CAF Super Cup: 2010, 2011
- FIFA Club World Cup runner-up: 2010
