= Stade de Mugunga =

Stadium in Goma, North Kivu

Coordinates: 1.6227°S 29.1388°E

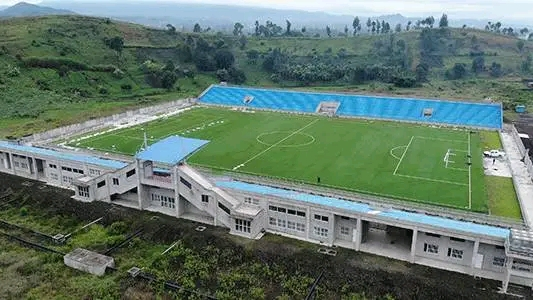
- Stade de Mugunga in 2023
- Interactive map of Stade de Mugunga
- Location: Lac Vert, Goma, North Kivu, Democratic Republic of the Congo
- Owner: City of Goma
- Capacity: 10,000
- Surface: Artificial turf
- Scoreboard: No

Construction
- Built: 2017–2023
- Opened: 17 August 2023; 3 years ago
- Cost: US$10 million
- Builder: SISC/Sinohydro 2
- Project manager: Agence Congolaise des Grands Travaux (ACGT)
- Main contractor: SISC/Sinohydro 2

Stade de Mugunga is a football stadium in the Lac Vert quarter of the Goma commune of Goma, North Kivu, Democratic Republic of the Congo. Construction began in 2017 as part of an infrastructure project financed by Sino-Congolaise des Mines (SICOMINES S.A.) under the Sino-Congolese cooperation framework. The Congolese Agency for Major Works (Agence Congolaise des Grands Travaux; ACGT) served as the project's delegated owner and supervised the construction, while SISC/Sinohydro 2 was the contractor. It has a seating capacity of 10,000 and is approximately 13–15 kilometers from central Goma.

== History ==
Construction began in 2017 as part of an infrastructure project financed by Sino-Congolaise des Mines (SICOMINES S.A.) under the Sino-Congolese cooperation framework. The first phase had a reported cost of approximately US$10 million. SISC/Sinohydro 2 was responsible for construction, while the Congolese Agency for Major Works (Agence Congolaise des Grands Travaux; ACGT) served as the project owner and was responsible for supervising the works and their quality. The Agence de Pilotage, de Coordination et de Suivi des Conventions (APCSC) was responsible for general coordination of the project. In 2021, ACGT personnel said the first phase focused on the main infrastructure, while a later phase was planned for external facilities and related works. Reported outstanding works included parking, floodlighting, an access road, and seating.

In March 2023, North Kivu authorities inspected and formally accepted the stadium's first phase. Outstanding works included changing rooms, sanitation and plumbing, toilets, nets, and rust protection. ACGT deputy project-management director Raphaël Bukumba said a second phase would address remaining works, including electricity, external parking, and a perimeter fence.

The stadium was handed over to North Kivu's provincial authorities on 17 August 2023. ACGT Deputy Director General Jean-Claude Mido Mbuete presented the keys to Lieutenant General Constant Ndima Kongba, then military governor of North Kivu. A 40-minute exhibition football match was held during the ceremony, although contemporary reports differed over the teams involved. Elle FM reported a match between FC Nyiragongo and FC Nouvelle Étoile, while an Agence Congolaise de Presse report described a match between Académie Hirondelle and Académie Nyiragongo. After the handover, ACGT engineers reportedly began preparations for the project's second phase.

== Facilities and criticism ==
The planned second phase included electrical installation, parking facilities, a perimeter wall or fence, an access road, and other improvements. Reports differ on the scope and completion of these works. In July 2026, Mutetezi Global criticized the stadium's design and cited the absence of features such as extensive commercial areas, landscaping, covered spectator areas, VIP boxes, and digital equipment.

The stadium's reported US$10 million cost was criticized in an August 2023 article published on Afriqueactualite241.net by journalist Judex Manfoumbi, who questioned whether the facility had been adequately completed and cited missing or incomplete amenities, including water, electricity, roofing, a scoreboard, and changing-room furnishings. Manfoumbi also called for possible involvement by the General Inspectorate of Finance (IGF). A March 2023 Beto.cd report similarly documented several components that remained incomplete as the project moved toward its second phase.
