= Alsény Bangoura =

Guinean footballer

Personal information
- Date of birth: 10 March 1993 (age 33)
- Place of birth: Conakry, Guinea
- Height: 1.72 m (5 ft 8 in)
- Position: Right back

Senior career*
Years	Team	Apps	(Gls)
2010–2013	CO de Bamako		
2013–2014	AS Kaloum Star		
2014–2018	Horoya AC		
2018–2019	Al-Khaleej		
2019–2023	AS Kaloum Star		

International career
2015–2018	Guinea	24	(0)
- * Club domestic league appearances and goals

Alsény Bangoura (born 10 March 1993) is a Guinean former footballer who played as a right back.

== Career ==
He has played club football for CO de Bamako, AS Kaloum Star, Horoya AC and Al-Khaleej.

He made his international debut for Guinea in 2015.
