= Samuel Nlend =

Central African footballer (born 1995)

Personal information
- Date of birth: 15 March 1995 (age 31)
- Place of birth: Douala, Cameroon
- Height: 1.86 m (6 ft 1 in)
- Position: Forward

Team information
- Current team: Los Leones Tunari

Senior career*
Years	Team	Apps	(Gls)
2015–2020	Union Douala		
2021–2023	Futuro Kings		
2023	Bisha		
2024–	Los Leones Tunari		

International career^{‡}
2015–2016	Cameroon	6	(1)
2022–	Central African Republic	8	(1)
- * Club domestic league appearances and goals ‡ National team caps and goals as of 19 March 2025

Samuel Nlend (born 15 March 1995) is a footballer who plays as a forward for Bolivian club Los Leones Tunari. Born in Cameroon, and a former Cameroon international, he represents the Central African Republic national team.

== Club career ==
In August 2016, Nlend signed for Al Ittihad Alexandria Club but was released four days later after testing positive for HIV.

On 1 January 2023, Nlend joined Saudi Arabian club Bisha.

== International career ==
Nlend represented the Cameroon national team in 6 friendlies from December 2015 to January 2016. In 2022, he switched to represent the Central African Republic national team, having gained citizenship.

=== International goals ===
Scores and results list Cameroon's goal tally first.

No	Date	Venue	Opponent	Score	Result	Competition
1.	25 January 2016	Stade Huye, Butare, Rwanda	DR Congo	3–1	3–1	2016 African Nations Championship
