= Nelson Munganga =

Congolese footballer

Nelson Omba Munganga (born 27 March 1993 in Kinshasa, Zaire) is a Congolese professional footballer who plays as a defensive midfielder for Maghreb de Fès.

== International career ==
Munganga was called up to the DR Congo national football team for the 2015 Africa Cup of Nations, and came on as a substitute in the Group B match against Cape Verde.

== Career statistics ==
=== International ===
Appearances and goals by national team and year
National team	Year	Apps	Goals
DR Congo	2014	2	0
DR Congo	2015	6	0
DR Congo	2016	8	2
DR Congo	2017	1	0
DR Congo	2018	2	0
Total		19	2

Scores and results list DR Congo's goal tally first, score column indicates score after each Munganga goal.

List of international goals scored by Nelson Munganga
No.	Date	Venue	Opponent	Score	Result	Competition
1	21 January 2016	Stade Huye, Butare, Rwanda	Angola	1–0	4–2	2016 African Nations Championship
2	19 June 2016	Independence Stadium, Windhoek, Namibia	Mozambique	1–0	1–0	2016 COSAFA Cup

== Honours ==
DR Congo

- Africa Cup of Nations bronze: 2015
