= Héritier Luvumbu =

Congolese footballer

Personal information
- Full name: Héritier Luvumbu Nzinga nshimiye
- Date of birth: 23 July 1992 (age 34)
- Place of birth: Kinshasa, Zaire
- Height: 1.75 m (5 ft 9 in)
- Position: Winger

Team information
- Current team: AS Vita Club
- Number: 8

Senior career*
Years	Team	Apps	(Gls)
2014–2017	AS Vita Club		
2017–2018	Union SG	15	(0)
2018–2019	AS FAR	27	(5)
2019–2020	Youssoufia Berrechid	8	(0)
2020–2021	Rayon Sports		
2021–2022	Primeiro de Agosto		
2022–2023	Rayon Sports		
2024–	AS Vita Club		

International career
2013	DR Congo U-21	0	(0)
2012–2016	DR Congo	14	(1)
- * Club domestic league appearances and goals as of 21:30, 17 February 2020 (UTC)

Héritier Luvumbu (born 23 July 1992) is a Congolese professional footballer who plays as a midfielder for AS Vita Club in the Illico Cash Ligue 1.

== International career ==
=== International goals ===
Scores and results list DR Congo's goal tally first.

No	Date	Venue	Opponent	Score	Result	Competition
1.	17 January 2016	Stade Huye, Butare, Rwandan	Ethiopia	2–0	3–0	2016 African Nations Championship

== Honours ==
AS Vita Club

- Linafoot runner-up: 2013
- CAF Champions League runner-up: 2014
