= Stephen Kabamba =

Zambian footballer (born 1990)

Personal information
- Full name: Stephen Kabamba
- Date of birth: 25 December 1990 (age 35)
- Place of birth: Chipata, Zambia
- Height: 1.68 m (5 ft 6 in)
- Position: Defender

Team information
- Current team: Green Buffaloes

International career^{‡}
Years	Team	Apps	(Gls)
2010–	Zambia	16	(0)
- ‡ National team caps and goals as of 15:50, 11 February 2016 (UTC)

Stephen Kabamba (born 25 December 1990) is a Zambian footballer.
