= Ibrahima Sory Soumah =

Guinean footballer

Personal information
- Full name: Ibrahima Sory Soumah
- Date of birth: February 22, 1995 (age 31)
- Place of birth: Guinea
- Position: Midfielder

Team information
- Current team: AS Kaloum Star
- Number: 8

Senior career*
Years	Team	Apps	(Gls)
2008–2011	ASC Dahra		
2011–2013	US Ouakam		
2013–2014	ASC Diaraf		
2014–	AS Kaloum Star		
2019	→ Mash'al (loan)	20	(15)

International career^{‡}
2016–	Guinea	7	(0)
- * Club domestic league appearances and goals as of 13:35, 9 February 2016 (UTC) ‡ National team caps and goals as of 13:35, 9 February 2016 (UTC)

Ibrahima Sory Soumah (born 22 February 1995) is a Guinean footballer who plays for AS Kaloum Star.

== Moldova ==
After moving to Moldovan football, Soumah initially played for Zimbru Chișinău before joining the country's prominent club, Sheriff Tiraspol. During his three-year tenure in Moldova, he established himself as a key player for Sheriff, making over 68 appearances across all competitions. He also gained European club competition experience, featuring in four UEFA Europa League matches and contributing one assist.

== Maccabi Petah Tikva ==
On 26 June 2026, Soumah signed a two-year contract with Israeli Premier League club Maccabi Petah Tikva, with an optional third year. He chose the newly promoted Israeli side despite receiving several offers from other European clubs.

== Honours ==
AS Kaloum Star

Runner-up

- Guinée Championnat National: 2014–15
