= Yves Diba Ilunga =

Congolese footballer (born 1987)

Personal information
- Date of birth: 12 August 1987 (age 39)
- Place of birth: Lubumbashi, Zaire
- Height: 1.81 m (5 ft 11 in)
- Position: Forward

Senior career*
Years	Team	Apps	(Gls)
2004–2005	SCOM Mikishi		
2006–2008	Saint-Éloi Lupopo		
2009	Vita Club		
2009–2011	Najran	31	(15)
2011–2013	Al-Raed	38	(13)
2013–2015	Al-Sailiya SC	18	(10)
2014	→ Al Kharaitiyat (loan)	11	(3)
2015–2016	Ajman Club	1	(0)
2016–2017	Al-Shoalah		(12)
2018	Vita Club		

International career
2006–2015	DR Congo	20	(5)
- * Club domestic league appearances and goals

Yves Diba Ilunga (born 12 August 1987) is a Congolese former professional footballer who played as a forward for DR Congo national team.

== Career statistics ==
Scores and results list DR Congo's goal tally first, score column indicates score after each Ilunga goal.

List of international goals scored by Yves Diba Ilunga
No.	Date	Venue	Opponent	Score	Result	Competition
1	11 August 2010	Cairo International Stadium, Cairo, Egypt	Egypt	1–1	3–6	Friendly
2	9 October 2010	Roumdé Adjia Stadium, Garoua, Cameroon	Cameroon	1–0	1–1	2012 Africa Cup of Nations qualification
3	17 November 2010	Stade Roger Rochard, Évreux, France	Mali	1–0	1–3	Friendly
4	27 March 2011	Stade des Martyrs, Kinshasa, DR Congo	Mauritius	3–0	3–0	2012 Africa Cup of Nations qualification
5	5 June 2011	Stade Anjalay, Belle Vue Maurel, Mauritius	Mauritius	1–1	2–1	2012 Africa Cup of Nations qualification
6	15 November 2011	Stade des Martyrs, Kinshasa, DR Congo	Swaziland	1–0	2–0	2014 FIFA World Cup qualification
