= Daut Musekwa =

Zambian footballer (born 1988)

Personal information
- Full name: Daut Musekwa
- Date of birth: 1 April 1988 (age 38)
- Place of birth: Zambia
- Position: Defender

Team information
- Current team: ZESCO United F.C.
- Number: 21

Senior career*
Years	Team	Apps	(Gls)
2013–	ZESCO United F.C.		

International career^{‡}
2015–	Zambia	4	(0)
- * Club domestic league appearances and goals as of 15:43, 11 February 2016 (UTC) ‡ National team caps and goals as of 15:43, 11 February 2016 (UTC)

Daut Musekwa (born 1 April 1988) is a Zambian footballer who plays for ZESCO United F.C.

== Honours ==
ZESCO United

Winner

- Zambian Premier League (2): 2014, 2015

Runner-up

- Zambian Premier League: 2013
