= TS Malekesa =

- Full name: Tout Solide Malekesa
- Founded: 1958
- Ground: Stade Lumumba; Kisangani, DR Congo
- Capacity: 10,000
- League: Linafoot Ligue 2

Tout Solide Malekesa is a football club in Kisangani, Democratic Republic of Congo. They formerly played in the Linafoot Ligue 2, the second level of professional football in DR Congo, and the Stade Lumumba with a capacity of 10,000.

TS Malekesa was founded in 1958. The club plays the Kisangani derby against local rivals CS Makiso.

== Honours ==
Ligue de Football de Province Orientale (LIFPO)

- Winners (4): 2003, 2007, 2008, 2010
