= Buchizya Mfune =

Zambian footballer (born 1979)

Personal information
- Full name: Buchizya Mfune
- Date of birth: 11 October 1979 (age 47)
- Place of birth: Zambia
- Height: 1.76 m (5 ft 9 in)
- Position: Defender

Team information
- Current team: Green Buffaloes

International career^{‡}
Years	Team	Apps	(Gls)
2015–	Zambia	18	(0)
- ‡ National team caps and goals as of 30 May 2018

Buchizya Mfune (born 11 October 1979) is a Zambian footballer for Green Buffaloes.
