= Joël Kimwaki =

Congolese footballer (born 1986)

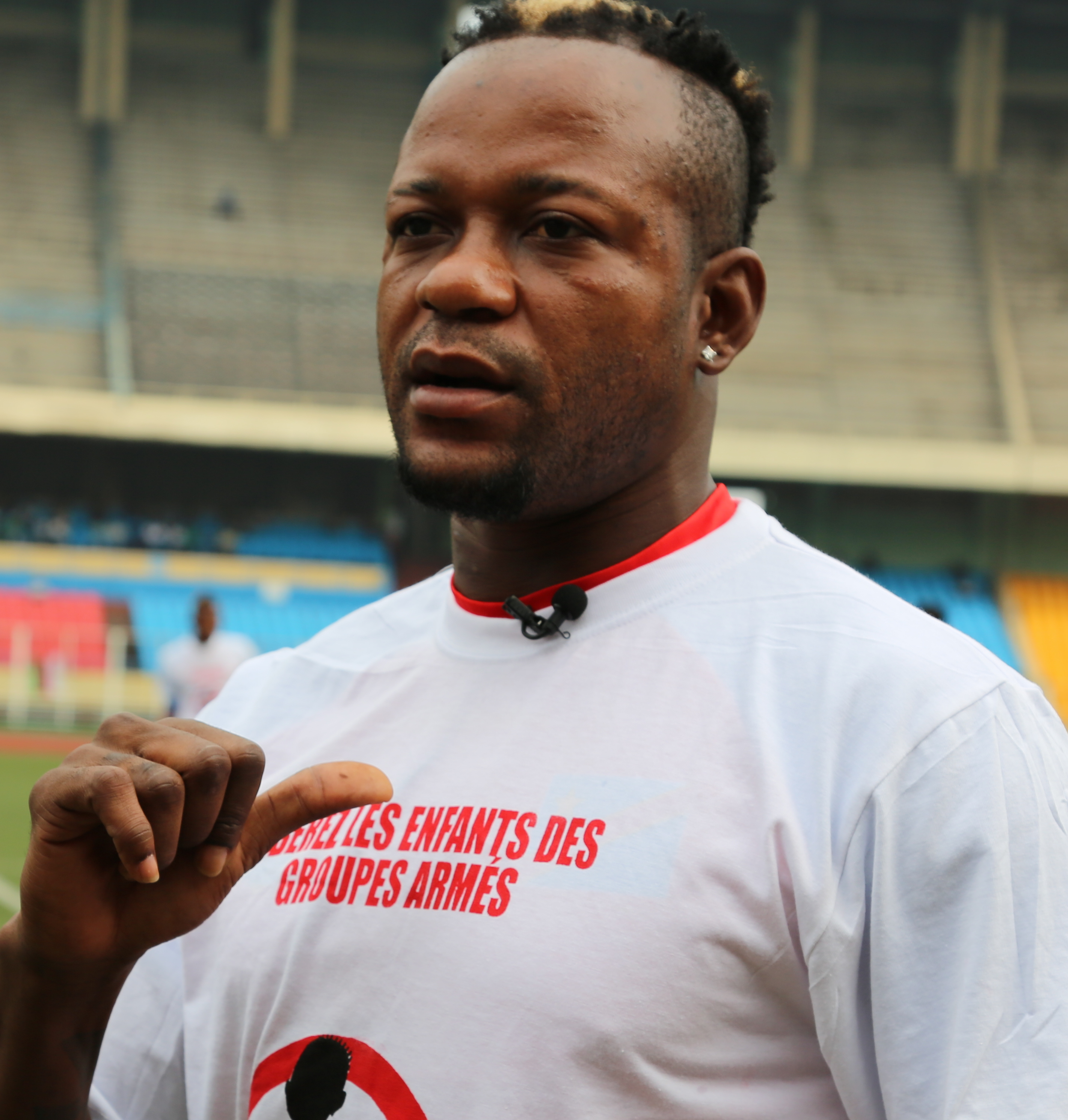
- Kimwaki in 2016

Personal information
- Full name: Joël Kimwaki Mpela
- Date of birth: 14 October 1986 (age 40)
- Place of birth: Kinshasa, DR Congo
- Height: 1.90 m (6 ft 3 in)
- Position: Centre-back

Team information
- Current team: FC Renaissance

Senior career*
Years	Team	Apps	(Gls)
2006–2009	DC Motema Pembe		
2010–2019	TP Mazembe		
2020–2022	FC Renaissance		

International career
2009–2016	DR Congo	52	(3)
- * Club domestic league appearances and goals

Joël Kimwaki Mpela (born 14 October 1986) is a Congolese professional footballer who plays as a centre-back for FC Renaissance du Congo. He made 52 appearances for the DR Congo national team scoring 3 goals.

== Club career ==
Kimwaki played for TP Mazembe in the 2010 FIFA Club World Cup, where they reached the final losing 3–0 to Inter Milan.

In November 2019, FC Renaissance du Congo announced the signing of Kimwaki from TP Mazembe on a one-season contract.

== International career ==
In 2015 he was selected for the DR Congo national team's 2015 Africa Cup of Nations squad.

== Career statistics ==
Scores and results list DR Congo's goal tally first, score column indicates score after each Kimwaki goal.

List of international goals scored by Joël Kimwaki
No.	Date	Venue	Opponent	Score	Result	Competition
1	31 January 2015	Estadio de Bata, Bata, Equatorial Guinea	Congo	3–2	4–2	2015 Africa Cup of Nations
2	14 June 2015	Stade Tata Raphaël, Kinshasa, DR Congo	Madagascar	2–0	2–1	2017 Africa Cup of Nations qualification
3	29 March 2016	Estádio 11 de Novembro, Luanda, Angola	Angola	1–0	2–0	2017 Africa Cup of Nations qualification

== Honors ==
DR Congo

- Africa Cup of Nations third place: 2015
