= Mohamed Youla =

Guinean footballer

Personal information
- Full name: Mohamed Youla
- Date of birth: 9 July 1996 (age 30)
- Place of birth: Guinea
- Position: Midfielder

Senior career*
Years	Team	Apps	(Gls)
–2016	Kaloum Star		
2016–2020	Saumur		
2020–2023	Avoine OCC	24	(1)

International career
2016	Guinea	6	(0)
- * Club domestic league appearances and goals as of 20:00, 10 October 2023 (UTC)

Mohamed Youla (born 9 July 1996) is a Guinean professional footballer who plays as a midfielder.
