= AS Kaloum Star =

Guinean football club

AS Kaloum
- Full name: Association Sportive Kaloum
- Nickname: A.S.K.
- Founded: 1963
- Ground: Stade de la Mission; Conakry, Guinea
- Capacity: 1,000
- Chairman: Aboubacar Sampil
- Manager: Ivan Minnaert
- League: Ligue 1 Pro
- 2025–26: 4th place
Home colours	Away colours

Association Sportive Kaloum, also known as A.S.K., is a football club based in Conakry, Guinea. In the 1960s A.S.K. was known as Conakry I, and won three titles under that name.

Due to the problems in sponsoring in 2008, the club was relegated to Ligue 2.

== Achievements ==
=== National ===
- Guinée Championnat National: 13
  - Champion: 1965, 1969, 1970, 1980, 1981, 1984, 1987, 1993, 1995, 1996, 1998, 2007, 2014
- Guinée Coupe Nationale: 7
  - Winner:: 1985, 1997, 1998, 2001, 2005, 2007, 2015
- Guinée Super Coupe: 1
  - Winner: 2015
- Tournoi Ruski Alumini: 2
  - 2003, 2007

=== International ===
- CAF Cup: 0
  - Runner-up: 1995
- UFOA Cup: 0
  - Runner-up: 1977

== Performance in CAF competitions ==
Kaloum Star's results in CAF competition
Season	Competition	Qualification method	Round	Opposition	Home	Away	Aggregate
1966	African Cup of Champions Clubs	Guinean champions	Preliminary Round	(Senegal) US Gorée	canc.	canc	w/o^{1}
1966	African Cup of Champions Clubs	Guinean champions	First round	(Mali) AS Real Bamako	2–3	2–1	3–5
1970	African Cup of Champions Clubs	Guinean champions	Second Round	(Senegal) ASC Jeanne d'Arc	3–1	2–1	4–3
1970	African Cup of Champions Clubs	Guinean champions	Quarter-finals	(Ivory Coast) Stade d'Abidjan	4–3	1–1	5–4
1970	African Cup of Champions Clubs	Guinean champions	Semi-finals	(First Congolese Republic) TP Englebert	1–2	3–1	5–2
1971	African Cup of Champions Clubs	Guinean champions	First round	(Nigeria) Enugu Rangers	3–3	2–1	5–4
1976	CAF Cup Winners' Cup		First round	(Republic of Upper Volta) RC Kadiogo	7–0	1–0	7–1
1976	CAF Cup Winners' Cup		Second round	(Cameroon) Tonnerre Yaoundé	1–2	0–0	1–2
1977	CAF Cup Winners' Cup		First round	(Republic of Upper Volta) Kadiogo FC	1–1	2–1	2–3
1981	African Cup of Champions Clubs	Guinean champions	First round	(The Gambia) Starlight Banjul	2–1	0–1	3–1
1981	African Cup of Champions Clubs	Guinean champions	Second round	(Ghana) Asante Kotoko	4–1	1–0	2–4
1981	African Cup of Champions Clubs	Guinean champions	Quarter-finals	(Ivory Coast) ASEC Mimosas	2–1	1–2	3–3 (a)
1981	African Cup of Champions Clubs	Guinean champions	Semi-finals	(Zaire) AS Vita Club	0–0	1–0	0–1
1982	African Cup of Champions Clubs	Guinean champions	Preliminary Round	(Sierra Leone) Real Republicans	3–0	1–0	4–0
1982	African Cup of Champions Clubs	Guinean champions	First round	(Nigeria) Enugu Rangers	0–0	1–0	0–1
1985	African Cup of Champions Clubs	Guinean champions	First Round	(Sierra Leone) Real Republicans	1–0	2–2	3–2
1985	African Cup of Champions Clubs	Guinean champions	Second round	(Nigeria) Enugu Rangers	2–0	3–1	3–3 (a)
1985	African Cup of Champions Clubs	Guinean champions	Quarter-finals	(Morocco) FAR Rabat	3–0	3–0	3–3 (1–3 p)
1986	CAF Cup Winners' Cup	Guinean cup winners	First round	(Morocco) Difaa El Jadida	1–0	2–0	1–2
1988	African Cup of Champions Clubs	Guinean champions	First round	(Ivory Coast) Africa Sports	0–2	3–1	1–5
1990	African Cup of Champions Clubs		Preliminary Round	(Guinea-Bissau) Benfica Bissau	2–0	1–0	2–1
1990	African Cup of Champions Clubs		First round	(Morocco) FAR Rabat	1–1	4–0	1–5
1992	CAF Cup		First round	(Gabon) ASMO Libreville	3–1	5–1	4–6
1994	African Cup of Champions Clubs	Guinean champions	First round	(Central African Republic) AS Tempête Mocaf	1–0	3–0	1–3
1995	CAF Cup		First round	(Ivory Coast) Africa Sports	0–1	3–4	4–4 (a)
1995	CAF Cup		Second round	(Angola) 1º de Maio	0–1	0–1	1–1 (4–2 p)
1995	CAF Cup		Quarter-finals	(Ghana) Asante Kotoko	0–0	2–3	2–2 (a)
1995	CAF Cup		Semi-finals	(Republic of the Congo) Inter Club Brazzaville	1–0	1–0	1–1 (a)
1995	CAF Cup		Finals	(Tunisia) ES Sahel	0–0	2–0	0–2
1996	African Cup of Champions Clubs	Guinean champions	First round	(Senegal) ASC Diaraf	1–1	0–0	1–1 (a)
1997	CAF Champions League	Guinean champions	First round	(Nigeria) Udoji United	1–1	3–1	2–4
1998	CAF Cup Winners' Cup	Guinean cup winners	First round	(Gabon) Mbilinga FC	2–1	1–0	2–2 (a)
1999	CAF Champions League	Guinean champions	Preliminary Round	(The Gambia) Real de Bajul	1–1	0–2	3–1
1999	CAF Champions League	Guinean champions	First round	(Nigeria) Shooting Stars	3–0	6–0	3–6
2002	CAF Cup Winners' Cup	Guinean cup winners	First round	(Gabon) AS Mangasport	1–1	1–1	1–1 (4–3 pen)
2003	CAF Cup		First round	(Senegal) SONACOS Diourbel	0–0	0–0	0–0 (2–4 p)
2006	CAF Confederation Cup	Guinean Cup winners	First round	(Egypt) Haras El Hodood	0–1	6–0	0–7
2008	CAF Champions League	Guinean champions	Preliminary Round	(Liberia) Invincible Eleven	canc.	canc.	w/o^{2}
2008	CAF Champions League	Guinean champions	First round	(Ivory Coast) ASEC Mimosas	1–1	0–0	1–1 (a)
2015	CAF Champions League	Guinean champions	Preliminary Round	(Ivory Coast) Séwé Sports	1–0	1–2	3–1
2015	CAF Champions League	Guinean champions	First round	(Zambia) ZESCO United	1–1	1–1	1–1 (5–4 p)
2015	CAF Champions League	Guinean champions	Second round	(Algeria) USM Alger	1–1	2–1	2–3
2015	CAF Confederation Cup	Guinean championship runner-up	First round	(South Africa) Orlando Pirates	0–2	4–1	1–6
2016	CAF Confederation Cup	Guinean Cup winners	First round	(Tunisia) Stade Gabésien	0–0	2–1	1–2
2017	CAF Confederation Cup	Guinean Cup runner-up–	First round	(Morocco) IR Tanger	1–0	3–0	1–3

^{1} US Gorée withdrew
^{2} Invincible Eleven withdrew

== Statistics ==
- Best position: Semifinalist (continental)
- Best position at cup competitions: Quarterfinals
- Appearances at the CAF championship competitions: 14
- Appearances at the CAF cup competitions: 10
- Best position at the CAF Cup: Finalist
- Appearances at the CAF Cup: 3
- Total goals scored at the CAF championship competitions: 64
  - Total matches played at the CAF Cup: 12
    - Total home matches played at the CAF Cup: 6
    - Total away matches played at the CAF Cup: 6

== Current squad ==
As of March 2015.

Note: Flags indicate national team as defined under FIFA eligibility rules; some limited exceptions apply. Players may hold more than one non-FIFA nationality.

No.	Pos.	Nation	Player
1	FW	GUI	Aboubacar Iyanga Sylla
2	GK	GUI	M'Bemba Camara
3	DF	GUI	Abdoul Aziz Keita
4	DF	GUI	Babacar Camara
5	MF	MLI	Mandala Konté
6	DF	SEN	Souleymane Badji
7	MF	MLI	Cheick Oumar Ballo
8	MF	GUI	Ibrahima Sory Soumah
9	DF	GUI	Alseny Camara Cantona
10	FW	GUI	Rachid Toure
11	FW	SEN	Moussa Diawara
12	FW	GUI	Alsény Camara Agogo
13	DF	GUI	Alseny Bangoura

No.	Pos.	Nation	Player
14	MF	CIV	Kevin Zougoula
16	DF	BFA	Issa Gouo
17	FW	CIV	Alain Jaques Tano
18	GK	GUI	Youssouf Toure
19	DF	CIV	Ben Adama Banh
20	MF	GUI	Mohamed Thiam
21	MF	GUI	Thomas Bangoura
22	DF	GUI	M'bemba Sylla
23	FW	BFA	Saidou Sow
24	FW	GUI	Malick Soumah
25	MF	MLI	Mamadou Kouyate

== Chairmen ==
- Bouba Sampil Camara
- Aboubacar Sampil

== Managers ==
- (France) Pascal Janin (in 2014)
- (Ivory Coast) François Zaoui
