= Mohamed Thiam =

Guinean footballer

Personal information
- Full name: Mohamed Thiam
- Date of birth: June 22, 1996 (age 30)
- Place of birth: Guinea
- Position: Midfielder

Team information
- Current team: Bédée Pleumeleuc (Bretagne 35)

International career^{‡}
Years	Team	Apps	(Gls)
2015–	Guinea	9	(0)
- ‡ National team caps and goals as of 30 May 2018

Mohamed Thiam (born 22 June 1996) is a Guinean footballer.
