= Kigali Pelé Stadium =

Football stadium in Kigali, Rwanda

- Nyamirambo Regional Stadium
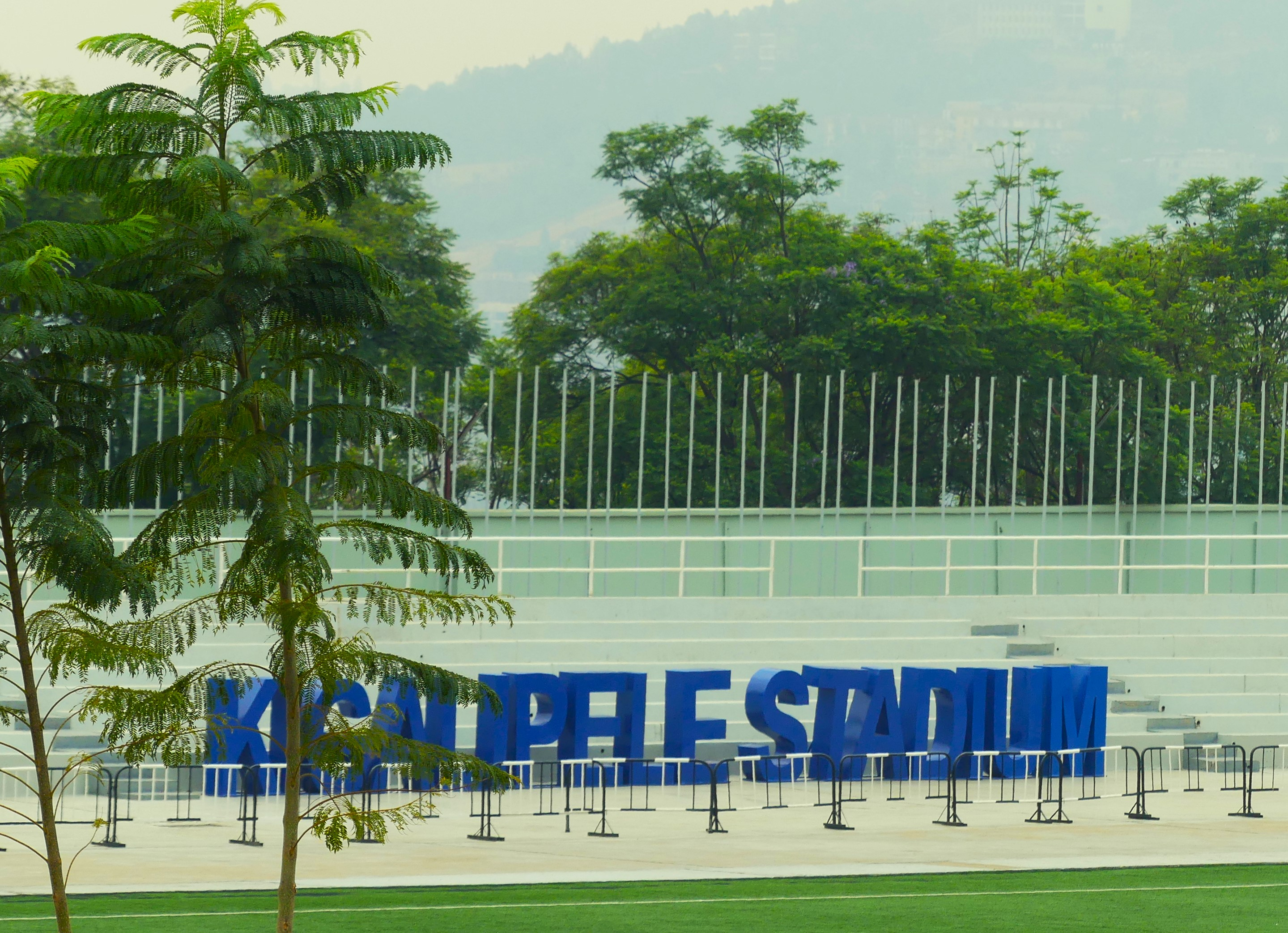
- Interactive map of Kigali Pelé Stadium
- Coordinates: 1.9781°S 30.0441°E
- Capacity: 7,000
- Surface: Artificial turf

Tenants
- APR F.C. Rayon Sports F.C. Rwanda national football team (selected matches)

Kigali Pelé Stadium, nicknamed Nyamirambo Regional Stadium, is a multi-purpose stadium in the Nyamirambo neighbourhood of Kigali, Rwanda. It is used mostly for football.

It has an artificial turf surface and seats 22,000 spectators. The stadium was deemed unfit to host international matches in 2021 by the Confederation of African Football and underwent a renovation that began in January 2023 ahead of the 73rd FIFA Congress, hosted by Kigali. It reopened on March 15, 2023, and was renamed in honor of the late Brazilian footballer Pelé by Rwanda president Paul Kagame and FIFA president Gianni Infantino.

In 1998, the stadium was used for the public executions of four individuals convicted of involvement in the Rwandan genocide, including Froduald Karamira.
