= Amahoro Stadium =

Stadium in Kigali, Rwanda

Coordinates: 1°57′18.1″S 30°6′51.2″E

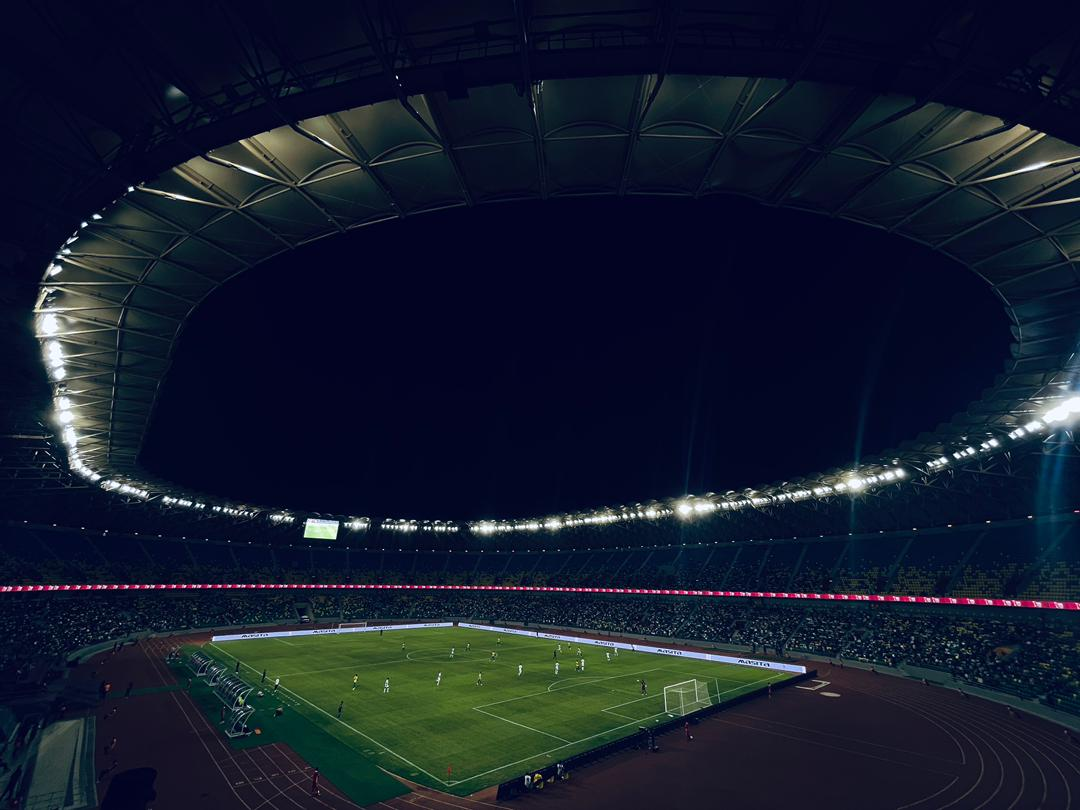
- CAF
- Interactive map of Amahoro Stadium
- Full name: Amahoro National Stadium
- Location: Kigali
- Owner: Government of Rwanda
- Capacity: 45,508
- Surface: GrassMaster

Construction
- Opened: 1986
- Renovated: 2011–2016, 2022–2024
- Expanded: 2022–2024
- Cost: $165 million
- Main contractor: China Civil Engineering Construction Corporation

Tenant
- Rwanda national football team (1986–present)

The Amahoro Stadium (Kinyarwanda: Stade Amahoro; French: Stade Amahoro; Kinyarwanda for "Peace Stadium"), officially known as Amahoro National Stadium, is a multi-purpose stadium in the Gasabo district of Kigali, Rwanda. With a capacity of 45,508, it is the largest stadium in Rwanda and hosts football matches, concerts, and public events. Amahoro stadium was given that name (home of the Amavubi Stars) due to it being the home of Rwanda's national team.

During the Rwandan genocide in 1994, it was temporarily a "UN Protected Site" hosting to up to 12,000 mainly Tutsi refugees. Amahoro stadium has witnessed various renovations, In August 2022, SUMMA, a Turkiye-based construction company, secured a deal worth $165 million to renovate Amahoro stadium with Petit stade indoor sports, the upgrade increased the capacity to 45,508 seats.

== History ==
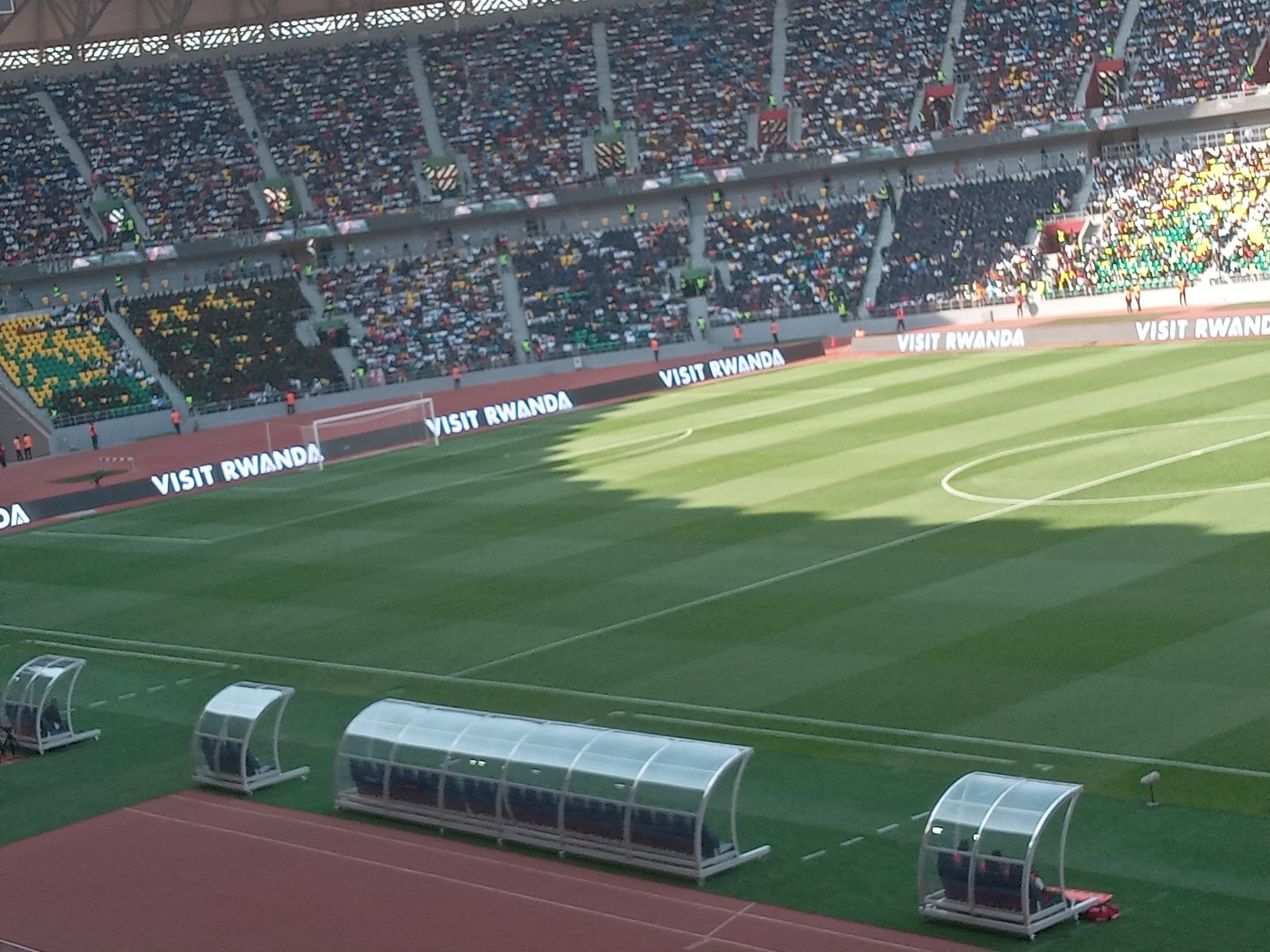
At the Rwanda Premier League’s derby APR F.C. vs Rayon Sports F.C.

The stadium was constructed by the China Civil Engineering Construction Corporation, at a cost of US$ 21 million. Construction began in March 1984, and was completed in January 1989.

In 1990, the Rwandan Civil War broke out between the Rwandan Patriotic Front (RPF), a Tutsi rebel group, and President Juvenal Habyarimana's government forces. The war ended in 1993 with a cease-fire and the signing of the Arusha Accords, which gave the RPF positions in a Broad-Based Transitional Government (BBTG) and the national army, and also provided for a United Nations peacekeeping force. This force was known as the United Nations Assistance Mission for Rwanda (UNAMIR), and was headed by Canadian general Roméo Dallaire. UNAMIR's initial headquarters was in the Hotel des Mille Collines, but the upmarket hotel did not welcome the presence of soldiers, and Dallaire quickly sought an alternative location; after some days of searching, UNAMIR chose the Amahoro Stadium, which was large enough to host an entire battalion of soldiers. The headquarters was opened on 17 November 1993, with an official ceremony attended by Dallaire and President Habyarimana.

The cease-fire ended abruptly on 6 April 1994 when Habyarimana's plane was shot down and he was killed; the assassination served as the catalyst for the Rwandan Genocide, which began within a few hours. The interim government began killing Tutsi and politically moderate Hutu, in well-planned attacks across the country. Tutsi civilians began seeking refuge in United Nations premises, and thousands of refugees gathered inside the Amahoro Stadium.
