= Huye Stadium =

Sports venue in Butare, Rwanda

Coordinates: 2°35′46″S 29°44′31″E

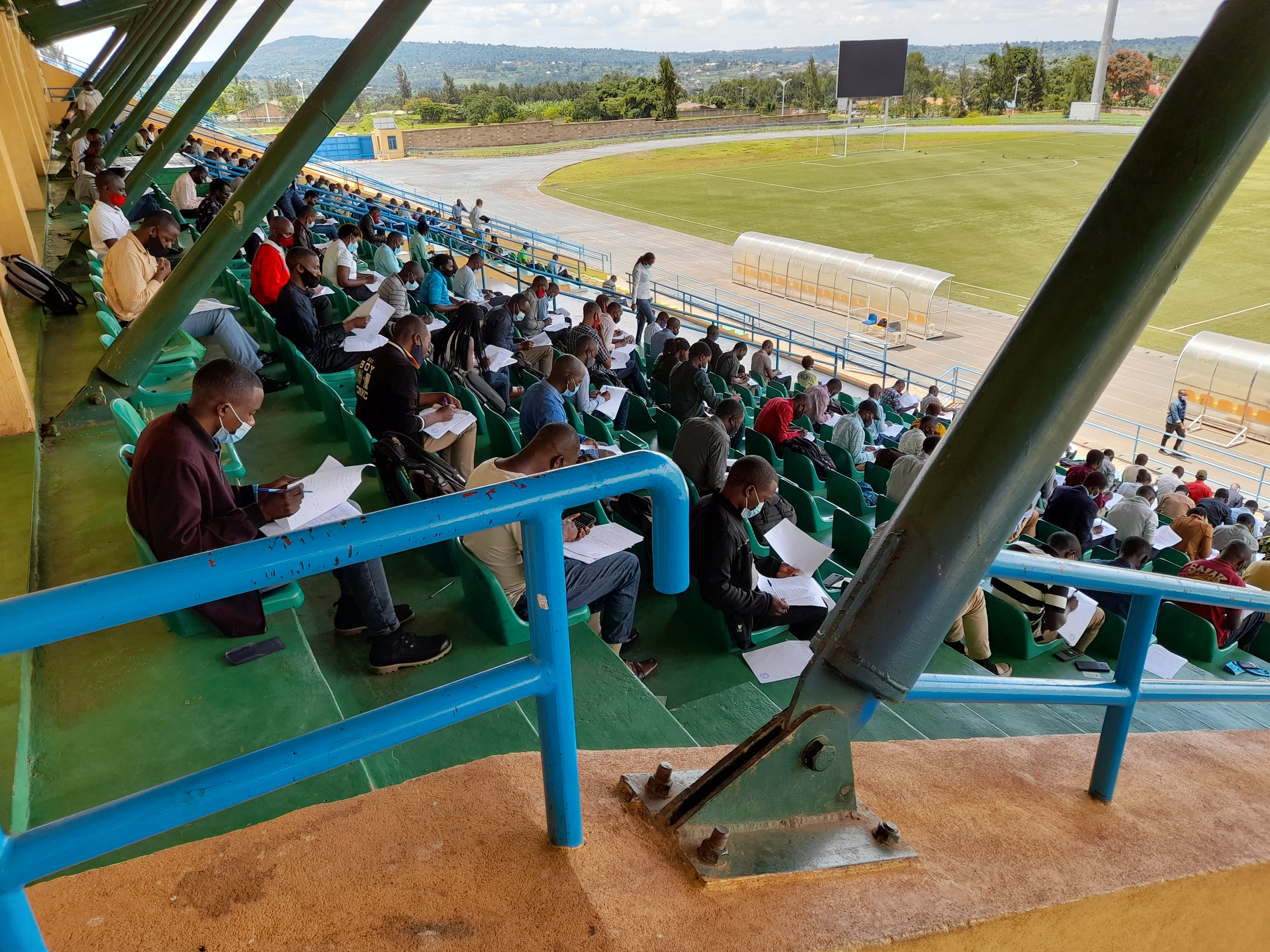
Huye Stadium in April 2021

The Huye Stadium is a multi-use stadium in Butare, Rwanda. It is currently used mostly for football matches and is the home ground of Mukura Victory Sports FC. The stadium holds 10,000 people.
