= 2014 African Nations Championship squads =

The following is a list of squads for each nation competing at the 2014 African Nations Championship in South Africa.

== Group A ==
=== South Africa ===
No.	Pos.	Player	Date of birth (age)	Caps	Goals	Club
1	GK	Moeneeb Josephs	19 May 1980 (aged 33)	23	0	(South African Football Association) Bidvest Wits
2	DF	Tshepo Gumede	21 April 1991 (aged 22)	5	0	(South African Football Association) Platinum Stars
3	DF	Tsepo Masilela	5 May 1985 (aged 28)	51	0	(South African Football Association) Kaizer Chiefs
4	DF	Thabo Nthethe	3 October 1984 (aged 29)	17	1	(South African Football Association) Bloemfontein Celtic
5	DF	Tebogo Langerman	6 May 1986 (aged 27)	2	0	(South African Football Association) Mamelodi Sundowns
6	MF	Lerato Chabangu	15 August 1985 (aged 28)	29	2	(South African Football Association) Moroka Swallows
7	DF	Bryce Moon	6 April 1986 (aged 27)	19	2	(South African Football Association) Mamelodi Sundowns
8	MF	Siphiwe Tshabalala	25 September 1984 (aged 29)	88	12	(South African Football Association) Kaizer Chiefs
9	FW	Katlego Mashego	18 May 1982 (aged 31)	22	2	(South African Football Association) Mamelodi Sundowns
10	MF	Sibusiso Vilakazi	29 December 1989 (aged 24)	3	0	(South African Football Association) Bidvest Wits
11	DF	Vuyo Mere	5 March 1984 (aged 29)	10	0	(South African Football Association) Platinum Stars
12	MF	Asavela Mbekile	1 November 1986 (aged 27)	0	0	(South African Football Association) Moroka Swallows
13	MF	Lindokuhle Mbatha	25 June 1985 (aged 28)	0	0	(South African Football Association) Platinum Stars
14	MF	Hlompho Kekana	23 May 1985 (aged 28)	10	3	(South African Football Association) Mamelodi Sundowns
15	MF	Jabulani Shongwe	28 February 1990 (aged 23)	0	0	(South African Football Association) Mamelodi Sundowns
16	GK	Itumeleng Khune	20 June 1987 (aged 26)	63	0	(South African Football Association) Kaizer Chiefs
17	FW	Bernard Parker	16 March 1986 (aged 27)	65	21	(South African Football Association) Kaizer Chiefs
18	DF	Kwanda Mngonyama	25 September 1993 (aged 20)	0	0	(South African Football Association) Bidvest Wits
19	MF	Buhle Mkhwanazi	1 February 1990 (aged 23)	0	0	(South African Football Association) University of Pretoria
20	FW	Ryan Chapman	14 April 1987 (aged 26)	1	0	(South African Football Association) Bidvest Wits
21	DF	Tefu Mashamaite	27 September 1984 (aged 29)	2	0	(South African Football Association) Kaizer Chiefs
22	GK	Siyabonga Mpontshane	17 April 1986 (aged 27)	0	0	(South African Football Association) Platinum Stars
23	FW	Edward Manqele	16 June 1987 (aged 26)	3	0	(South African Football Association) Moroka Swallows

=== Mali ===
Coach: Djibril Dramé

No.	Pos.	Player	Date of birth (age)	Caps	Goals	Club
1	GK	Cheick Bathily	10 October 1982 (aged 31)	0	0	(Malian Football Federation) Djoliba AC
2	DF	Souleymane Konaté	20 September 1989 (aged 24)	0	0	(Malian Football Federation) Stade Malien
3	MF	Ibourahima Sidibé	27 December 1992 (aged 21)	0	0	(Malian Football Federation) AS Real Bamako
4	DF	Ousmane Keita	9 May 1994 (aged 19)	0	0	(Malian Football Federation) Djoliba AC
5	DF	Bourama Coulibaly	21 August 1990 (aged 23)	0	0	(Malian Football Federation) Stade Malien
6	DF	Mahamadou Traoré	31 December 1994 (aged 19)	0	0	(Malian Football Federation) Djoliba AC
7	FW	Abdoulaye Sissoko	18 July 1992 (aged 21)	0	0	(Malian Football Federation) Stade Malien
8	MF	Cheick Chérif Doumbia	19 August 1991 (aged 22)	0	0	(Malian Football Federation) Stade Malien
9	FW	Lassana Diarra	29 December 1989 (aged 24)	0	0	(Malian Football Federation) AS Bakaridjan
10	MF	Hamidou Traoré	7 October 1996 (aged 17)	0	0	(Malian Football Federation) Cercle Olympique
11	MF	Adama Traoré	5 June 1995 (aged 18)	0	0	(Malian Football Federation) Cercle Olympique
12	DF	Idrissa Traoré	17 July 1990 (aged 23)	0	0	(Malian Football Federation) Djoliba AC
13	DF	Issaka Samaké	20 October 1994 (aged 19)	0	0	(Malian Football Federation) Stade Malien
14	MF	Lamine Diawara	18 May 1986 (aged 27)	0	0	(Malian Football Federation) Stade Malien
15	FW	Lassina Diarra	1 April 1988 (aged 25)	0	0	(Malian Football Federation) Djoliba AC
16	GK	Soumbeïla Diakité	25 August 1984 (aged 29)	0	0	(Malian Football Federation) Stade Malien
17	DF	Idrissa Sangaré	18 April 1987 (aged 26)	0	0	(Malian Football Federation) Cercle Olympique
18	MF	Yaya Samaké	19 September 1987 (aged 26)	0	0	(Malian Football Federation) AS Nianan
19	FW	Hamidou Sinayoko	11 March 1986 (aged 27)	0	0	(Malian Football Federation) Djoliba AC
20	MF	Mamadou Sidibé	28 December 1992 (aged 21)	0	0	(Malian Football Federation) AS Police
21	MF	Morimakan Koïta	25 December 1990 (aged 23)	0	0	(Malian Football Federation) Stade Malien
22	GK	Germain Berthé	24 October 1993 (aged 20)	0	0	(Malian Football Federation) Onze Créateurs
23	DF	Oumar Koné	13 April 1991 (aged 22)	0	0	(Malian Football Federation) Stade Malien

=== Mozambique ===
Coach: João Chissano

No.	Pos.	Player	Date of birth (age)	Caps	Goals	Club
1	GK	Nelson Pinto	20 February 1987 (aged 26)	4	0	(Mozambican Football Federation) Ferroviário Maputo
2	DF	João Mazive	12 April 1990 (aged 23)			(Mozambican Football Federation) Costa do Sol
3	DF	Gabito	4 February 1981 (aged 32)	12	0	(Mozambican Football Federation) Maxaquene
4	MF	Kito	23 May 1984 (aged 29)	12	0	(Mozambican Football Federation) Maxaquene
5	DF	Chico Mioche	10 July 1985 (aged 28)			(Mozambican Football Federation) Liga Muçulmana
6	DF	Monis	23 May 1988 (aged 25)			(Mozambican Football Federation) Ferroviário da Beira
7	FW	Belito	11 March 1991 (aged 22)	5	0	(Mozambican Football Federation) Liga Muçulmana
8	FW	Manuelito	29 April 1989 (aged 24)	3	0	(Mozambican Football Federation) Costa do Sol
9	FW	Maninho	30 March 1991 (aged 22)	7	1	(Mozambican Football Federation) Ferroviário Beira
10	FW	Sonito	10 August 1985 (aged 28)	7	0	(Mozambican Football Federation) Liga Muçulmana
11	FW	Mário Sinamunda	27 September 1990 (aged 23)			(Mozambican Football Federation) Ferroviário Beira
12	GK	Soarito	9 February 1984 (aged 29)	5	0	(Mozambican Football Federation) HCB Songo
13	DF	Chico Muchanga	5 November 1991 (aged 22)	13	0	(Mozambican Football Federation) Ferroviário Maputo
14	MF	Diogo	1 March 1989 (aged 24)	13	0	(Mozambican Football Federation) Ferroviário Maputo
15	MF	Nelito	11 February 1988 (aged 25)			(Mozambican Football Federation) Ferroviário Beira
16	DF	Miró	30 April 1982 (aged 31)			(Mozambican Football Federation) Liga Muçulmana
17	MF	Imo Pilale	23 January 1989 (aged 24)			(Mozambican Football Federation) Liga Muçulmana
18	DF	Dario Khan	24 January 1984 (aged 29)	35	1	(Mozambican Football Federation) Costa do Sol
19	MF	Lanito	25 May 1986 (aged 27)			(Mozambican Football Federation) Desportivo Maputo
20	MF	Josemar	7 August 1987 (aged 26)	28	3	(Mozambican Football Federation) Liga Muçulmana
21	DF	Dito	2 April 1986 (aged 27)			(Mozambican Football Federation) Costa do Sol
22	GK	Víctor Timana	5 February 1978 (aged 35)	2	0	(Mozambican Football Federation) Desportivo Maputo
23	MF	Alvarito Manhique	6 September 1982 (aged 31)	15	0	(Mozambican Football Federation) Costa do Sol

=== Nigeria ===
Coach: Stephen Keshi

No.	Pos.	Player	Date of birth (age)	Caps	Goals	Club
1	GK	Chigozie Agbim	28 November 1984 (aged 29)			(Nigeria Football Federation) Enugu Rangers
16	GK	Daniel Akpeyi	3 August 1986 (aged 27)			(Nigeria Football Federation) Heartland
21	GK	Dele Alampasu	24 December 1996 (aged 17)			(Nigeria Football Federation) Abuja Football Academy
6	DF	Azubuike Egwuekwe	16 July 1989 (aged 24)			(Nigeria Football Federation) Warri Wolves
2	DF	Solomon Kwambe	30 September 1993 (aged 20)			(Nigeria Football Federation) Sunshine Stars
3	DF	Francis Benjamin	2 January 1993 (aged 21)			(Nigeria Football Federation) Heartland
15	DF	Umar Zango	23 February 1994 (aged 19)			(Nigeria Football Federation) Kano Pillars
5	DF	Kunle Odunlami	5 March 1990 (aged 23)			(Nigeria Football Federation) Sunshine Stars
18	DF	Bright Esieme	4 October 1992 (aged 21)			(Nigeria Football Federation) Enyimba
14	DF	Ikechukwu Gabriel	20 October 1989 (aged 24)			(Nigeria Football Federation) Bayelsa United
23	DF	Erhun Obanor	5 September 1995 (aged 18)			(Nigeria Football Federation) Bendel Insurance
13	DF	Ikenna Hilary	17 April 1991 (aged 22)			(Nigeria Football Federation) Sunshine Stars
19	MF	Shehu Abdullahi	12 March 1993 (aged 20)			(Nigeria Football Federation) Kano Pillars
7	MF	Ejike Uzoenyi	23 March 1988 (aged 25)			(Nigeria Football Federation) Enugu Rangers
4	MF	Ugonna Uzochukwu	3 November 1992 (aged 21)			(Nigeria Football Federation) Enugu Rangers
8	MF	Rabiu Ali	27 September 1990 (aged 23)			(Nigeria Football Federation) Kano Pillars
22	MF	Joshua Obaje	1 April 1990 (aged 23)			(Nigeria Football Federation) Warri Wolves
11	FW	Barnabas Imenger Jr.	24 November 1991 (aged 22)			(Nigeria Football Federation) Lobi Stars
20	FW	Ifeanyi Edeh	25 October 1990 (aged 23)			(Nigeria Football Federation) Enyimba
10	FW	Christian Pyagbara	13 March 1996 (aged 17)			(Nigeria Football Federation) Sharks
17	FW	Christian Obiozor	31 October 1994 (aged 19)			(Nigeria Football Federation) Enugu Rangers
9	FW	Gbolahan Salami	15 April 1991 (aged 22)			(Nigeria Football Federation) 3SC
12	FW	Aliyu Ibrahim	18 November 1994 (aged 19)			(Nigeria Football Federation) Nasarawa United

== Group B ==
=== Zimbabwe ===
Coach: Ian Gorowa

No.	Pos.	Player	Date of birth (age)	Caps	Goals	Club
23	GK	Tafadzwa Dube	19 December 1984 (aged 29)	8	0	(Zimbabwe Football Association) CAPS United
1	GK	George Chigova	4 March 1991 (aged 22)	6	0	(Zimbabwe Football Association) Dynamos
16	GK	Munyaradzi Diya	9 July 1985 (aged 28)	0	0	(Zimbabwe Football Association) Highlanders
2	DF	Erick Chipeta	28 June 1990 (aged 23)	10	0	(Zimbabwe Football Association) Hwange Colliery
5	DF	Hardlife Zvirekwi	5 May 1987 (aged 26)	10	0	(Zimbabwe Football Association) CAPS United
18	DF	Felix Chindungwe	9 September 1982 (aged 31)	9	0	(Zimbabwe Football Association) Chicken Inn
15	DF	Partson Jaure	8 July 1990 (aged 23)	9	0	(Zimbabwe Football Association) Dynamos
6	DF	Augustine Mbara	30 December 1991 (aged 22)	2	0	(Zimbabwe Football Association) Dynamos
21	DF	Themba Ndlovu	10 January 1984 (aged 30)	1	0	(Zimbabwe Football Association) Dynamos
14	MF	Masimba Mambare	9 May 1986 (aged 27)	11	3	(Zimbabwe Football Association) Dynamos
8	MF	Oscar Machapa	1 June 1987 (aged 26)	7	0	(Zimbabwe Football Association) Dynamos
13	MF	Peter Moyo	8 May 1988 (aged 25)	6	0	(Zimbabwe Football Association) Highlanders
4	MF	Tawanda Muparati	10 September 1983 (aged 30)	5	0	(Zimbabwe Football Association) Dynamos
12	MF	Ali Sadiki	10 December 1987 (aged 26)	4	0	(Zimbabwe Football Association) FC Platinum
3	MF	Danny Phiri	25 July 1989 (aged 24)	3	0	(Zimbabwe Football Association) Chicken Inn
10	MF	Kudakwashe Mahachi	29 September 1993 (aged 20)	2	0	(Zimbabwe Football Association) Chicken Inn
20	MF	Pascal Manhanga	23 March 1991 (aged 22)	0	0	(Zimbabwe Football Association) Triangle United
17	FW	Charles Sibanda	30 March 1985 (aged 28)	17	2	(Zimbabwe Football Association) FC Platinum
7	FW	Nelson Mazivisa	7 September 1985 (aged 28)	8	4	(Zimbabwe Football Association) FC Platinum
11	FW	Donald Ngoma	4 February 1989 (aged 24)	6	2	(Zimbabwe Football Association) FC Platinum
22	FW	Milton Ncube	4 July 1987 (aged 26)	4	0	(Zimbabwe Football Association) Highlanders
9	FW	Simba Nhivi	10 January 1991 (aged 23)	4	1	(Zimbabwe Football Association) Dynamos
19	FW	Simba Sithole	5 May 1989 (aged 24)	0	0	(Zimbabwe Football Association) How Mine FC

=== Morocco ===
Coach: Hassan Benabicha

No.	Pos.	Player	Date of birth (age)	Caps	Goals	Club
1	GK	Nadir Lamyarghri	13 February 1976 (aged 37)	1	0	(Royal Moroccan Football Federation) Wydad Casablanca
12	GK	Khalid Askri	20 March 1981 (aged 32)	1	0	(Royal Moroccan Football Federation) Raja Casablanca
2	DF	Abderrahim Achchakir	15 December 1986 (aged 27)	1	0	(Royal Moroccan Football Federation) FAR Rabat
3	DF	Zakaria El Hachimi	4 August 1987 (aged 26)	1	0	(Royal Moroccan Football Federation) Raja Casablanca
4	DF	Mohamed Saidi	14 October 1994 (aged 19)	1	0	(Royal Moroccan Football Federation) Wydad Casablanca
5	DF	Ahmed Chagou	27 November 1987 (aged 26)	1	0	(Royal Moroccan Football Federation) DHJ
6	DF	Mohamed Abarhoun	3 May 1989 (aged 24)	1	0	(Royal Moroccan Football Federation) Moghreb Tétouan
16	DF	Mohamed Oulhaj	6 January 1988 (aged 25)	1	0	(Royal Moroccan Football Federation) Raja Casablanca
17	DF	Issam Erraki	5 January 1981 (aged 32)	1	0	(Royal Moroccan Football Federation) Raja Casablanca
19	DF	Abdelkbir El Ouadi	20 February 1993 (aged 20)	1	0	(Royal Moroccan Football Federation) Widad Fez
21	DF	Adil Karrouchi	23 November 1982 (aged 31)	1	0	(Royal Moroccan Football Federation) Raja Casablanca
22	GK	Mohamed El Yousfi	18 January 1991 (aged 22)	1	0	(Royal Moroccan Football Federation) Moghreb Tétouan
23	DF	Adil Sassa	1 December 1981 (aged 32)	1	0	(Royal Moroccan Football Federation) DHJ
7	MF	Brahim El Bahri	9 February 1984 (aged 29)	1	0	(Royal Moroccan Football Federation) FUS de Rabat
8	MF	Fatah Said	15 January 1986 (aged 27)	1	0	(Royal Moroccan Football Federation) Wydad Casablanca
9	MF	Iajour Mouhssine	14 June 1985 (aged 28)	1	0	(Royal Moroccan Football Federation) Raja Casablanca
10	MF	Mohsine Moutaouali	3 March 1986 (aged 27)	1	0	(Royal Moroccan Football Federation) Raja Casablanca
13	MF	Abdessamad Rafik	8 April 1982 (aged 31)	1	0	(Royal Moroccan Football Federation) OC Safi
14	MF	Anas Al Asbahi	15 October 1993 (aged 20)	1	0	(Royal Moroccan Football Federation) Wydad Casablanca
15	MF	Abdessamad El Mobarky	1 January 1981 (aged 32)	1	0	(Royal Moroccan Football Federation) Chabab Rif Al Hoceima
18	MF	Walid El Karti	23 July 1994 (aged 19)	1	0	(Royal Moroccan Football Federation) Wydad Casablanca
20	MF	Zaid Krouch	27 January 1991 (aged 22)	1	0	(Royal Moroccan Football Federation) Moghreb Tétouan
20	FW	Zakaria Hadraf	12 March 1990 (aged 23)	1	0	(Royal Moroccan Football Federation) DHJ

=== Uganda ===
Coach: (Serbia) Milutin Sredojević

No.	Pos.	Player	Date of birth (age)	Caps	Goals	Club
18	GK	Benjamin Ochan	18 September 1989 (aged 24)	6	0	(Federation of Uganda Football Associations) Victoria University SC
1	GK	Ali Kimera	4 July 1991 (aged 22)	0	0	(Federation of Uganda Football Associations) Victoria University SC
19	GK	Ismail Watenga	15 May 1995 (aged 18)	0	0	(Federation of Uganda Football Associations) Vipers SC
12	DF	Denis Iguma	10 October 1992 (aged 21)	0	0	(Federation of Uganda Football Associations) Victoria University SC
5	DF	Richard Kasagga	4 July 1993 (aged 20)	10	0	(Federation of Uganda Football Associations) Kiira Young
13	DF	Savio Kabugo	20 January 1995 (aged 18)	8	0	(Federation of Uganda Football Associations) Victoria University SC
20	DF	Isaac Muleme	10 October 1992 (aged 21)	3	0	(Federation of Uganda Football Associations) Victoria University SC
6	DF	Martin Mpuga	20 November 1992 (aged 21)	2	1	(Federation of Uganda Football Associations) Victoria University SC
2	DF	Nicholas Wadada	27 July 1994 (aged 19)	10	0	(Federation of Uganda Football Associations) Vipers SC
16	DF	Hassan Wasswa	14 February 1988 (aged 25)	32	0	(Federation of Uganda Football Associations) KCC FC
15	DF	Ronnie Kisekka	6 December 1991 (aged 22)	0	0	(Federation of Uganda Football Associations) KCC FC
17	MF	Julius Ntambi	3 June 1992 (aged 21)	1	0	(Federation of Uganda Football Associations) Kiira Young
22	MF	Vincent Kayizi	6 March 1984 (aged 29)	36	1	(Federation of Uganda Football Associations) Vipers S.C.
4	MF	Ivan Ntege	8 September 1994 (aged 19)	2	0	(Federation of Uganda Football Associations) KCC FC
11	MF	Brian Majwega	7 November 1992 (aged 21)	16	1	(Federation of Uganda Football Associations) KCC FC
8	MF	Saidi Kyeyune	30 November 1993 (aged 20)	14	1	(Federation of Uganda Football Associations) URA FC
10	MF	Joseph Mpande	12 March 1993 (aged 20)	11	0	(Federation of Uganda Football Associations) Vipers SC
21	MF	Allan Kyambadde	15 January 1996 (aged 17)	0	0	(Federation of Uganda Football Associations) Express F.C.
3	MF	Yasser Mugerwa	1 May 1994 (aged 19)	0	0	(Federation of Uganda Football Associations) Victoria University SC
14	FW	Simon Okwi	24 August 1994 (aged 19)	2	0	(Federation of Uganda Football Associations) Victoria University SC
23	FW	Crespo Asiku	30 June 1986 (aged 27)			(Federation of Uganda Football Associations) Bul FC
7	FW	Francis Olaki	11 June 1995 (aged 18)			(Federation of Uganda Football Associations) Soana FC
9	FW	Yunus Sentamu	13 August 1994 (aged 19)	2	2	(Federation of Uganda Football Associations) Vipers S.C.

=== Burkina Faso ===
Coach: Brama Traoré

No.	Pos.	Player	Date of birth (age)	Caps	Goals	Club
1	GK	Mohamed Kaboré	31 December 1980 (aged 33)	23	0	(Burkinabé Football Federation) ASFA Yennenga
16	GK	Laré Diarra	19 March 1990 (aged 23)	1	0	(Burkinabé Football Federation) Kadiogo
23	GK	Abdoul Kader Kobré	23 August 1996 (aged 17)	0	0	(Burkinabé Football Federation) Majestic
2	DF	Yaya Coulibaly	17 May 1992 (aged 21)	2	0	(Burkinabé Football Federation) ASFA Yennenga
3	DF	Allassane Sango	7 January 1993 (aged 21)	5	0	(Burkinabé Football Federation) ASFA Yennenga
4	DF	Ousséni Yéyé	8 January 1987 (aged 27)	1	0	(Burkinabé Football Federation) USFA Ouagadougou
5	DF	Issa Gouo	9 September 1989 (aged 24)	8	0	(Burkinabé Football Federation) Santos
6	DF	Issoufou Dayo	6 August 1991 (aged 22)	7	0	(Burkinabé Football Federation) Étoile Filante
20	DF	Mbah Koné	12 December 1990 (aged 23)	4	0	(Burkinabé Football Federation) Bobo Sport
21	DF	Saïdou Simporé	31 December 1992 (aged 21)	2	1	(Burkinabé Football Federation) Kadiogo
7	MF	Aboubacar Traoré	10 December 1992 (aged 21)	7	0	(Burkinabé Football Federation) Santos
8	MF	Aliassou Sanou	24 May 1988 (aged 25)	2	0	(Burkinabé Football Federation) Sonabel
9	MF	Valentin Zoungrana	30 October 1992 (aged 21)	4	0	(Burkinabé Football Federation) Sonabel
10	MF	Issouf Kaboré	20 December 1993 (aged 20)	4	1	(Burkinabé Football Federation) Étoile Filante
12	MF	Oumarou Nébié	25 September 1990 (aged 23)	6	0	(Burkinabé Football Federation) ASFA Yennenga
13	MF	Cyrille Bayala	24 May 1996 (aged 17)	3	1	(Burkinabé Football Federation) ASFA Yennenga
15	MF	Eric Traoré	21 May 1990 (aged 23)	2	0	(Burkinabé Football Federation) US Ouagadougou
17	MF	Aboubacar Barro	10 January 1991 (aged 23)	4	0	(Burkinabé Football Federation) Étoile Filante
22	MF	Elizée Demankel To	14 June 1989 (aged 24)	3	0	(Burkinabé Football Federation) ASFA Yennenga
11	FW	Bassirou Ouédraogo	31 December 1992 (aged 21)	5	1	(Burkinabé Football Federation) ASFA Yennenga
14	FW	Boubacar Nimi	20 February 1988 (aged 25)	0	0	(Burkinabé Football Federation) Étoile Filante
18	FW	Ilias Tiendrébéogo	31 December 1992 (aged 21)	5	0	(Burkinabé Football Federation) ASFA Yennenga
19	FW	Francis Kaboré	3 June 1994 (aged 19)	1	0	(Burkinabé Football Federation) Santos

== Group C ==
=== Ghana ===
Coach Maxwell Konadu

No.	Pos.	Player	Date of birth (age)	Caps	Goals	Club
1	GK	Isaac Amoako	12 August 1983 (aged 30)	0	0	(Ghana Football Association) Asante Kotoko
2	DF	Godfred Saka	2 November 1988 (aged 25)	3	0	(Ghana Football Association) Aduana Stars
3	DF	Kwabena Adusei	3 June 1987 (aged 26)	5	2	(Ghana Football Association) Asante Kotoko
4	MF	Jackson Owusu	15 October 1988 (aged 25)	3	0	(Ghana Football Association) Berekum Chelsea
5	DF	Abeiku Ainooson	24 September 1990 (aged 23)	3	0	(Ghana Football Association) Asante Kotoko
6	MF	Michael Akuffu	18 December 1985 (aged 28)	6	0	(Ghana Football Association) Asante Kotoko
7	MF	Richard Mpong	4 July 1990 (aged 23)	5	1	(Ghana Football Association) Asante Kotoko
8	MF	Jordan Opoku (captain)	8 October 1987 (aged 26)	6	0	(Ghana Football Association) Asante Kotoko
9	FW	Seidu Bancey	15 May 1990 (aged 23)	4	0	(Ghana Football Association) Asante Kotoko
10	MF	Asiedu Attobrah	15 March 1995 (aged 18)	3	0	(Ghana Football Association) New Edubiase United
11	MF	Theophilus Annorbaah	17 September 1987 (aged 26)	5	1	(Ghana Football Association) Medeama
12	FW	Samuel Afful	29 September 1991 (aged 22)	1	0	(Ghana Football Association) Sekondi Hasaacas
13	FW	Sulley Mohammed	7 December 1995 (aged 18)	4	0	(Ghana Football Association) King Faisal Babes
14	DF	Tijani Joshua	22 October 1988 (aged 25)	6	0	(Ghana Football Association) Ashanti Gold
15	DF	Nuru Sulley	11 June 1992 (aged 21)	6	0	(Ghana Football Association) Hearts of Oak
16	GK	Adade Foli	12 May 1991 (aged 22)	0	0	(Ghana Football Association) Medeama
17	MF	Latif Mohammed	22 January 1993 (aged 20)	5	0	(Ghana Football Association) Ashanti Gold
18	FW	Paul de Vries	3 March 1996 (aged 17)	2	0	(Ghana Football Association) Wa All Stars
19	FW	Kennedy Boateng	30 November 1989 (aged 24)	2	0	(Ghana Football Association) Medeama
20	DF	Francis Morton	5 November 1992 (aged 21)	1	0	(Ghana Football Association) Ebusua Dwarfs
21	MF	Yahaya Mohamed	17 February 1988 (aged 25)	5	1	(Ghana Football Association) Asante Kotoko
22	GK	Steven Adams	28 September 1989 (aged 24)	6	0	(Ghana Football Association) Aduana Stars
23	DF	Alfred Nelson	18 August 1992 (aged 21)	1	0	(Ghana Football Association) Liberty Professionals

=== Congo ===
No.	Pos.	Player	Date of birth (age)	Caps	Goals	Club
1	GK	Chancel Massa	24 January 1987 (aged 26)	1	0	(Congolese Football Federation) AC Léopards
16	GK	Gildas Kiwoko Mouyabi	29 October 1986 (aged 27)	1	0	(Congolese Football Federation) AC Léopards
22	GK	Pavelh Ndzila	12 January 1995 (aged 18)	1	0	(Congolese Football Federation) Etoile du Congo
3	DF	Garcia Nkouka	1 January 1994 (aged 19)	1	0	(Congolese Football Federation) CARA Brazzaville
5	DF	Boris Moubhibo Ngonga	25 November 1988 (aged 25)	1	0	(Congolese Football Federation) AC Léopards
6	DF	Dimitri Magnoléké Bissiki	17 March 1991 (aged 22)	1	0	(Congolese Football Federation) AC Léopards
13	DF	Hermann Nkodia	7 July 1988 (aged 25)	1	0	(Congolese Football Federation) AC Léopards
15	DF	Childran Djodjo Miangounina	17 February 1989 (aged 24)	1	0	(Congolese Football Federation) AC Léopards
17	DF	Kevine Andzouana	15 November 1982 (aged 31)	1	0	(Congolese Football Federation) Diables Noirs
23	DF	Chris Fagih Tchibota	22 April 1995 (aged 18)	1	0	(Congolese Football Federation) CS La Mancha
2	MF	Tsiba Moukassa	18 April 1992 (aged 21)	1	0	(Congolese Football Federation) AC Léopards
8	MF	Hardy Binguila	17 July 1997 (aged 16)	1	0	(Congolese Football Federation) Diables Noirs
10	MF	Moise Nkounkou	2 August 1996 (aged 17)	1	0	(Congolese Football Federation) Etoile du Congo
11	MF	Glen Kinfounia	28 July 1996 (aged 17)	1	0	(Congolese Football Federation) Diables Noirs
12	MF	Henrino Makaya	17 February 1993 (aged 20)	1	0	(Congolese Football Federation) AS Cheminots
14	MF	Kader Bidimbou	20 February 1996 (aged 17)	1	0	(Congolese Football Federation) AC Léopards
18	MF	Prestone Lakolo	13 April 1989 (aged 24)	1	0	(Congolese Football Federation) AC Léopards
19	MF	Stanislas Dua Ankira	4 December 1994 (aged 19)	1	0	(Congolese Football Federation) Diables Noirs
21	MF	Charlevy Mabiala	31 March 1996 (aged 17)	1	0	(Congolese Football Federation) ACNFF
4	FW	Lorry Nkolo	22 June 1993 (aged 20)	1	0	(Congolese Football Federation) Diables Noirs
7	FW	Rudy Ndey	9 March 1990 (aged 23)	1	0	(Congolese Football Federation) AC Léopards
9	FW	Bersyl Obassi	29 March 1996 (aged 17)	1	0	(Congolese Football Federation) Diables Noirs
20	FW	Gedson Baleckita	9 February 1984 (aged 29)	1	0	(Congolese Football Federation) CARA Brazzaville

=== Libya ===
Coach: (Spain) Javier Clemente

No.	Pos.	Player	Date of birth (age)	Caps	Goals	Club
1	GK	Muhammad Nashnoush	14 June 1988 (aged 25)	21	0	(Libyan Football Federation) Al-Ahly Tripoli
2	DF	Ahmad Al Maghasi	10 February 1993 (aged 20)	5	0	(Libyan Football Federation) Al-Ittihad
3	DF	Elmehdi Elhouni	19 June 1992 (aged 21)	6	0	(Libyan Football Federation) Al-Ahly Tripoli
4	MF	Ahmed Al Alwani	19 August 1981 (aged 32)	9	0	(Libyan Football Federation) Al-Ahly
5	DF	Osama Chtiba	27 September 1988 (aged 25)	6	0	(Libyan Football Federation) Al-Ittihad
6	DF	Mohamed Al Gabsi	14 January 1991 (aged 22)	0	0	(Libyan Football Federation) Al-Hilal
7	MF	Moataz Al-Mehdi	9 August 1990 (aged 23)	6	0	(Libyan Football Federation) Al-Ahly
8	MF	Mohamed Al-Gadi	22 June 1990 (aged 23)	6	0	(Libyan Football Federation) Al-Ahly Tripoli
9	FW	Mohamed Al Ghanodi	22 November 1992 (aged 21)	17	2	(Libyan Football Federation) Al-Ahly Tripoli
10	FW	Moayed Al Khritli	28 July 1993 (aged 20)	3	0	(Libyan Football Federation) Al-Wahda
11	MF	Mohamed Mahfud	10 July 1991 (aged 22)	1	0	(Libyan Football Federation) Al-Ittihad
12	GK	Ali Eshnayna	10 May 1991 (aged 22)	0	0	(Libyan Football Federation) Al-Swihli
13	MF	Motasem Sabbou	20 August 1993 (aged 20)	8	0	(Libyan Football Federation) Al-Ittihad
14	DF	Ali Salama (captain)	18 September 1987 (aged 26)	24	0	(Libyan Football Federation) Al-Ahly Tripoli
15	DF	Ahmed Al Trbi	6 June 1992 (aged 21)	13	0	(Libyan Football Federation) Al-Hilal
16	MF	Al Musrati	6 April 1996 (aged 17)	5	0	(Libyan Football Federation) Al-Ittihad
17	DF	Abdelrahman Al-Omami	2 July 1984 (aged 29)	8	1	(Libyan Football Federation) Al-Ahly
18	MF	Faisal Al Badri	4 June 1990 (aged 23)	18	5	(Libyan Football Federation) Al-Hilal
19	FW	Elmutasem Abushnaf	14 November 1991 (aged 22)	6	1	(Libyan Football Federation) Al-Wahda
20	FW	Mohamed Anis Saltou	1 April 1992 (aged 21)	2	0	(Libyan Football Federation) Al-Madina
21	FW	Abdelsalam Elfaitory	22 July 1993 (aged 20)	7	3	(Libyan Football Federation) Al-Hilal
22	GK	Khaled Elwerfelli	5 October 1985 (aged 28)	0	0	(Libyan Football Federation) Al-Madina
23	MF	Ali Taher Elhadi	12 March 1991 (aged 22)	2	0	(Libyan Football Federation) Al-Olympic

=== Ethiopia ===
Coach: Sewnet Bishaw

No.	Pos.	Player	Date of birth (age)	Caps	Goals	Club
1	GK	Jemal Tasew	27 April 1989 (aged 24)			(Ethiopian Football Federation) Ethiopian Coffee FC
2	DF	Degu Debebe	19 March 1984 (aged 29)			(Ethiopian Football Federation) Saint George F.C.
3	MF	Fasika Asfaw	27 April 1986 (aged 27)			(Ethiopian Football Federation) Ethiopian Coffee FC
4	DF	Abebaw Butako	19 January 1992 (aged 21)			(Ethiopian Football Federation) Saint George F.C.
5	DF	Aynalem Hailu	12 October 1986 (aged 27)			(Ethiopian Football Federation) Dashen Beer
6	DF	Alula Girma	15 July 1993 (aged 20)			(Ethiopian Football Federation) Saint George F.C.
7	FW	Manaye Fantu	24 September 1990 (aged 23)			(Ethiopian Football Federation) Defence F.C.
8	MF	Asrat Megersa	20 June 1987 (aged 26)			(Ethiopian Football Federation) Dashen Beer
9	FW	Ephrem Ashamo	11 September 1994 (aged 19)			(Ethiopian Football Federation) Ethiopian Coffee FC
10	DF	Birhanu Bogale	27 February 1986 (aged 27)			(Ethiopian Football Federation) Dedebit F.C.
11	FW	Omod Okwury	5 October 1990 (aged 23)			(Ethiopian Football Federation) Saint George F.C.
12	DF	Biyadiglign Elyas	24 May 1988 (aged 25)			(Ethiopian Football Federation) Saint George F.C.
13	MF	Salahadin Bargicho	31 May 1994 (aged 19)			(Ethiopian Football Federation) Saint George F.C.
14	MF	Minyahile Teshome	13 November 1985 (aged 28)			(Ethiopian Football Federation) Saint George F.C.
15	MF	Mentesenot Adane	28 May 1993 (aged 20)			(Ethiopian Football Federation) Saint George F.C.
16	FW	Dawit Fekadu	29 April 1986 (aged 27)			(Ethiopian Football Federation) Dedebit F.C.
17	DF	Seyoum Tesfaye	19 December 1989 (aged 24)			(Ethiopian Football Federation) Dedebit F.C.
18	GK	Dereje Alemu	30 April 1990 (aged 23)			(Ethiopian Football Federation) Dashen Beer
19	FW	Adane Girma	25 January 1985 (aged 28)			(Ethiopian Football Federation) Saint George F.C.
20	MF	Behailu Assefa	10 August 1988 (aged 25)			(Ethiopian Football Federation) Saint George F.C.
21	MF	Taddele Mengesha	1 April 1987 (aged 26)			(Ethiopian Football Federation) Dedebit F.C.
22	DF	Thok James	2 July 1994 (aged 19)			(Ethiopian Football Federation) Ethiopian Coffee FC
23	GK	Tariku Getnet	3 December 1994 (aged 19)			(Ethiopian Football Federation) Dedebit F.C.

== Group D ==
=== DR Congo ===
Coach: Santos Muntubile

No.	Pos.	Player	Date of birth (age)	Caps	Goals	Club
1	GK	Robert Kidiaba	1 February 1976 (aged 37)			(Congolese Association Football Federation) TP Mazembe
2	DF	Joël Kimwaki	14 October 1986 (aged 27)			(Congolese Association Football Federation) TP Mazembe
3	DF	Kiritsho Kasusula	6 August 1982 (aged 31)			(Congolese Association Football Federation) TP Mazembe
4	DF	Eric Nkulukuta	6 September 1982 (aged 31)			(Congolese Association Football Federation) TP Mazembe
5	MF	Lema Mabidi	11 June 1993 (aged 20)			(Congolese Association Football Federation) AS Vita Club
6	DF	Yannick Bangala	12 April 1994 (aged 19)			(Congolese Association Football Federation) DC Motema Pembe
7	MF	Ndombe Mubele	17 April 1994 (aged 19)			(Congolese Association Football Federation) AS Vita Club
8	FW	Riguene Pembele	3 February 1994 (aged 19)			(Congolese Association Football Federation) CS Don Bosco
9	FW	Jean-Marc Makusu Mundele	27 March 1993 (aged 20)			(Congolese Association Football Federation) Bel'Or
10	MF	Héritier Luvumbu	23 July 1992 (aged 21)			(Congolese Association Football Federation) AS Vita Club
11	MF	Cédrick Mbidi Mavuanga	1 June 1994 (aged 19)			(Congolese Association Football Federation) DC Motema Pembe
12	MF	Bobo Muselenge	19 November 1989 (aged 24)			(Congolese Association Football Federation) DC Motema Pembe
13	MF	Hervé Ndonga	2 May 1992 (aged 21)			(Congolese Association Football Federation) TP Mazembe
14	MF	Ilongo Ngasanya	8 August 1984 (aged 29)			(Congolese Association Football Federation) TP Mazembe
15	MF	Mukoko Mayayi	18 March 1988 (aged 25)			(Congolese Association Football Federation) DC Motema Pembe
16	GK	Hervé Lomboto	27 October 1989 (aged 24)			(Congolese Association Football Federation) AS Vita Club
17	MF	Guy Lusadisu	28 December 1982 (aged 31)			(Congolese Association Football Federation) AS Vita Club
18	DF	Patou Simbi Ebunga	26 August 1983 (aged 30)			(Congolese Association Football Federation) AS Vita Club
19	FW	Eddy Ngoy Emomo	13 October 1993 (aged 20)			(Congolese Association Football Federation) Sharks XI
20	MF	Thierry Kasereka	26 April 1994 (aged 19)			(Congolese Association Football Federation) AS Vita Club
21	MF	Eric Ngoie	23 July 1984 (aged 29)			(Congolese Association Football Federation) CS Don Bosco
22	FW	Philippe Mavuba	27 December 1995 (aged 18)			(Congolese Association Football Federation) AS Dragons
23	GK	Freddy Kayinda Tshini	19 December 1985 (aged 28)			(Congolese Association Football Federation) AS Dragons

=== Mauritania ===
Coach: (France) Patrice Neveu

No.	Pos.	Player	Date of birth (age)	Caps	Goals	Club
1	GK	Souleymane Diallo	2 December 1987 (aged 26)			(Football Federation of the Islamic Republic of Mauritania) ASC Tevragh-Zeina
2	DF	Pape Moussa Sakho	26 November 1982 (aged 31)			(Football Federation of the Islamic Republic of Mauritania) ASAC Concorde
3	DF	Mamadou Idrissa Wade	9 June 1985 (aged 28)			(Football Federation of the Islamic Republic of Mauritania) FC Nouadhibou
4	DF	Ibrahima Sy	3 May 1987 (aged 26)			(Football Federation of the Islamic Republic of Mauritania) ASC Tevragh-Zeina
5	DF	Cheikhna Varajou	6 February 1985 (aged 28)			(Football Federation of the Islamic Republic of Mauritania) ASC Tidjikja
6	DF	Bocar Coulibaly	3 August 1980 (aged 33)			(Football Federation of the Islamic Republic of Mauritania) ASC Tevragh-Zeina
7	MF	Mamadou Niass	4 June 1994 (aged 19)			(Football Federation of the Islamic Republic of Mauritania) ASAC Concorde
8	MF	Moussa Sidi Bagayoko	31 December 1983 (aged 30)			(Football Federation of the Islamic Republic of Mauritania) ASAC Concorde
9	FW	Ely Cheikh Voulany	25 June 1988 (aged 25)			(Football Federation of the Islamic Republic of Mauritania) ASC Tevragh-Zeina
10	MF	Mohamed Yacoub Bâ	1 December 1984 (aged 29)			(Football Federation of the Islamic Republic of Mauritania) ASC Tevragh-Zeina
11	FW	Moulaye Ahmed	5 December 1987 (aged 26)			(Football Federation of the Islamic Republic of Mauritania) ACS Ksar
12	FW	Al-Mamy Traoré	31 December 1987 (aged 26)			(Football Federation of the Islamic Republic of Mauritania) FC Nouadhibou
13	DF	Abdoulaye Niass	31 December 1993 (aged 20)			(Football Federation of the Islamic Republic of Mauritania) ASAC Concorde
14	MF	Amar Djiby Samb	31 December 1984 (aged 29)			(Football Federation of the Islamic Republic of Mauritania) FC Nouadhibou
15	DF	Yacoub Fall	12 December 1980 (aged 33)			(Football Federation of the Islamic Republic of Mauritania) FC Nouadhibou
16	MF	Cheikh Lekhneiver	31 December 1980 (aged 33)			(Football Federation of the Islamic Republic of Mauritania) FC Nouadhibou
17	MF	Taghiyoulla Denna	15 June 1986 (aged 27)			(Football Federation of the Islamic Republic of Mauritania) FC Nouadhibou
18	MF	Hacen Moctar El Ide	11 December 1997 (aged 16)			(Football Federation of the Islamic Republic of Mauritania) ASAC Concorde
19	MF	Mohamed El-Kory	21 September 1996 (aged 17)			(Football Federation of the Islamic Republic of Mauritania) ASAC Concorde
20	DF	Abdel Aziz Lô	27 December 1989 (aged 24)			(Football Federation of the Islamic Republic of Mauritania) ACS Ksar
21	MF	Moussa Samba	31 December 1988 (aged 25)			(Football Federation of the Islamic Republic of Mauritania) ASC Tevragh-Zeina
22	GK	Babacar Touré	18 January 1988 (aged 25)			(Football Federation of the Islamic Republic of Mauritania) ASAC Concorde
23	MF	Abdoulaye Gaye	13 September 1991 (aged 22)			(Football Federation of the Islamic Republic of Mauritania) ACS Ksar

=== Gabon ===
Coach: Stéphane Bounguendza

No.	Pos.	Player	Date of birth (age)	Caps	Goals	Club
1	GK	Paulin Nzambi	5 May 1981 (aged 32)			(Gabonese Football Federation) Missile
2	DF	Aaron Appindangoyé	20 September 1992 (aged 21)			(Gabonese Football Federation) Mounana
3	DF	Edmond Mouele	13 October 1988 (aged 25)			(Gabonese Football Federation) Mangasport
4	DF	Erwin N'Guema Obame	7 March 1989 (aged 24)			(Gabonese Football Federation) US Bitam
5	MF	Farel Mounguengui	5 May 1988 (aged 25)			(Gabonese Football Federation) Sapins FC
6	MF	Tchen Djesnot Kabi	27 April 1986 (aged 27)			(Gabonese Football Federation) Missile
7	MF	Dieudonné Nkoume	10 April 1991 (aged 22)			(Gabonese Football Federation) Mounana
8	FW	Romuald Ntsitsigui	8 April 1991 (aged 22)			(Gabonese Football Federation) Mangasport
9	MF	Davy Mayoungou	27 October 1993 (aged 20)			(Gabonese Football Federation) Mounana
10	FW	Daniel Cousin	7 February 1977 (aged 36)			(Gabonese Football Federation) Sapins FC
11	MF	Étienne Alain Djissikadié	10 December 1978 (aged 35)			(Gabonese Football Federation) Mounana
12	MF	Samson Mbingui	9 February 1992 (aged 21)			(Gabonese Football Federation) Mangasport
13	MF	Duval N'Zembi	12 October 1988 (aged 25)			(Gabonese Football Federation) Missile
14	MF	Cyrille Avebe	3 February 1977 (aged 36)			(Gabonese Football Federation) Missile
15	DF	Martin Ndong	28 June 1988 (aged 25)			(Gabonese Football Federation) Mangasport
16	GK	Yves Bitséki Moto	26 April 1983 (aged 30)			(Gabonese Football Federation) US Bitam
17	MF	Emmanuel Ndong	4 May 1992 (aged 21)			(Gabonese Football Federation) US Bitam
18	DF	Franck Engonga	26 July 1993 (aged 20)			(Gabonese Football Federation) Mounana
19	MF	Knox Younga	27 April 1994 (aged 19)			(Gabonese Football Federation) Mounana
20	MF	Lionel Yacouva	12 July 1990 (aged 23)			(Gabonese Football Federation) US Bitam
21	FW	Bonaventure Sokambi	29 January 1991 (aged 22)			(Gabonese Football Federation) Mounana
22	DF	Jean-René Nze Mba	1 October 1994 (aged 19)			(Gabonese Football Federation) Sapins FC
23	GK	William Loussoueké	12 August 1987 (aged 26)			(Gabonese Football Federation) Cercle Mbéri Sportif

=== Burundi ===
Coach: (Egypt) Lofty Naseem

No.	Pos.	Player	Date of birth (age)	Caps	Goals	Club
1	GK	Arakaza MacArthur	27 July 1995 (aged 18)	9	0	(Football Federation of Burundi) Flambeau de l’Est
18	GK	Yvan Rugumandiye	4 July 1992 (aged 21)	0	0	(Football Federation of Burundi) Athlético Olympic FC
23	GK	Saidi Tama Nduwimana	6 June 1989 (aged 24)	0	0	(Football Federation of Burundi) AS Inter Star
3	DF	Rashid Léon Harerimana	14 March 1994 (aged 19)	5	0	(Football Federation of Burundi) LLB Académic FC
8	DF	Léopold Nkurikiye	25 September 1991 (aged 22)	2	0	(Football Federation of Burundi) Vital'O F.C.
12	DF	Célestin Habonimana	5 November 1988 (aged 25)	6	0	(Football Federation of Burundi) Flambeau de l’Est
13	DF	Frédéric Nsabiyumva	26 April 1995 (aged 18)	5	0	(Football Federation of Burundi) Athlético Olympic FC
14	DF	Yussuf Ndikumana	1 July 1993 (aged 20)	9	1	(Football Federation of Burundi) LLB Académic FC
15	DF	Issa Hakizimana	28 August 1994 (aged 19)	8	0	(Football Federation of Burundi) LLB Académic FC
17	DF	Hassan Hakizimana	15 October 1990 (aged 23)	7	0	(Football Federation of Burundi) Athlético Olympic FC
19	DF	Stéphane Rugonumugabo	12 December 1990 (aged 23)	0	0	(Football Federation of Burundi) LLB Académic FC
2	MF	Gaël Duhayindavyi	3 October 1990 (aged 23)	14	0	(Football Federation of Burundi) LLB Académic FC
6	MF	Christophe Nduwarugira	22 June 1994 (aged 19)	9	3	(Football Federation of Burundi) LLB Académic FC
9	MF	Hussein Shabani	26 September 1990 (aged 23)	3	0	(Football Federation of Burundi) Flambeau de l’Est
10	MF	Shasir Nahimana	5 August 1993 (aged 20)	2	0	(Football Federation of Burundi) AS Inter Star
11	MF	Pascal Hakizimana	25 April 1993 (aged 20)	1	0	(Football Federation of Burundi) Flambeau de l’Est
16	MF	Mossi Moussa	15 September 1992 (aged 21)	3	0	(Football Federation of Burundi) Le Messager FC
4	FW	Jean-Claude Ndarusanze	20 June 1988 (aged 25)	5	0	(Football Federation of Burundi) LLB Académic FC
5	FW	Jean Gentil Nduwimana	13 January 1986 (aged 27)	3	0	(Football Federation of Burundi) Olympic Star
7	FW	Fiston Abdul Razak	1 March 1993 (aged 20)	11	1	(Football Federation of Burundi) LLB Académic FC
20	FW	Selemani Ndikumana	26 November 1988 (aged 25)	?	13	(Football Federation of Burundi) Vital'O F.C.
21	FW	Aimé Nzohabonayo	7 September 1989 (aged 24)	5	1	(Football Federation of Burundi) AS Inter Star
22	FW	Gilbert Tuyihimbaze	1 July 1993 (aged 20)	0	0	(Football Federation of Burundi) Guêpiers du Lac
