= 2019–20 Nedbank Cup =

ke yona (the one)

Tournament details
- Country: South Africa
- Teams: 32

Final positions
- Champions: Mamelodi Sundowns (5th title)

Tournament statistics
- Matches played: 39
- Goals scored: 122 (3.13 per match)
- Attendance: 106,890 (2,741 per match)
- Top goal scorer(s): 4 (goals); Terrence Dzvukamanja

The 2019–20 Nedbank Cup was the 2019–20 edition of South Africa's premier knockout club football (soccer) competition, the Nedbank Cup.

The 16 Premier Soccer League (PSL) clubs, eight National First Division (NFD) teams, as well as eight teams from the amateur ranks entered the main draw of 32 teams. The PSL teams entered the main draw automatically, while the NFD clubs needed to play a single qualifier against other NFD clubs. The amateur teams go through a series of qualifiers to enter the main draw.

From the round of 32 onwards, teams were not seeded, and the first sides drawn received home-ground advantage. There were no replays, and games which ended in a draw after 90 minutes were subject to 30 minutes extra time followed by penalties if necessary.

The Nedbank Cup winners Mamelodi Sundowns already qualified for Champions League through the ABSA Premiership, therefore the spot was given to the runner up Bloemfontein Celtic.

== First round ==
29 November 2019	Real Kings	3–1	Steenberg United	Chatsworth, Durban
15:00	Chirambandare 21'; Manqele 77'; Mashiane 84'	Report	Van Reenen (red card) 57'; Lakay 65'	Stadium: Chatsworth Stadium

29 November 2019	Moroka Swallows	1–1 (0–3 p)	Royal Eagles	Johannesburg
15:00	Mokoena 26'	Report	Khumalo 43'	Stadium: Dobsonville Stadium

30 November 2019	Free State Stars	1–2	TS Sporting	Bloemfontein
15:00	Hambira 1' (o.g.)	Report	Magubane 25'; Malekana 59'	Stadium: Goble Park

30 November 2019	Richards Bay	1–2	Ajax Cape Town	Richards Bay
15:00	Sekese 56'	Report	Mkhize 8'; Mosiatlhaga 46'	Stadium: Umhlathuze Sports Complex

30 November 2019	Jomo Cosmos	2–1	University of Pretoria	Potchefstroom
15:00	Debouto 20'; Ndlovu 83'		Mbesuma 77' (pen.)	Stadium: Olën Park

30 November 2019	Mbombela United	1–0	JDR Stars	Mbombela
15:00	Badenhorst 12'; Ndlela (red card) 78'	Report		Stadium: KaNyamazane Stadium

1 December 2019	TS Galaxy	1–0	Cape Umoya United	Kameelrivier
15:00	Nduli 47'; Shozi 81'	Report		Stadium: Kameelrivier Stadium

1 December 2019	Tshakhuma Tsha Madzivhandila	3–4 (a.e.t.)	Uthongathi	Thohoyandou
15:00	Mbandlwa 80'; Nyandombo 85'; Nevhulamba 97'	Report	Liphoko 68'; Dube 71'; Ngcobo 102'; Shange (red card) 120'; Mmodi 120'	Stadium: Thohoyandou Stadium

== Last 32 ==
8 February 2020	Amavarara	2–1	Super Eagles	East London
15:00	S.Maso 34'; K.Velaphi 42'		T.Mokoena 51'	Stadium: Sisa Dukashe Stadium

11 February 2020	Zizwe United	0–1	Happy Wanderers	Cape Town
15:00			M.Mazibuko 25'	Stadium: Athlone Stadium

6 February 2020	Ajax Cape Town	2–2 (3–4 p)	TS Sporting	Cape Town
19:30	S.Mfecane 89'; S.Mkhize 115'		M.Wagaba 17'; K.Mojela 101'	Stadium: Athlone Stadium

9 February 2020	Jomo Cosmos	0–1	Hungry Lions	Profert Olën Park
15:00			R.Ramatlhapeng 52'

8 February 2020	Passion	2–3 (a.e.t.)	Real Kings	Kameelrivier Stadium
15:00	N.Masina 58' (pen.); T.Mbonani 72'		P.Cele 61' (pen.); L.Mashiane 67'; V.Bakah 101'

8 February 2020	Highlands Park	2–0	Uthongathi	Johannesburg
20:15	P.Shalulile 32' 67'			Stadium: Makhulong Stadium

8 February 2020	Kaizer Chiefs	1–0	Royal Eagles	Johannesburg
18:00	L.Manyama 70'			Stadium: FNB Stadium

9 February 2020	Black Leopards	4–0	North West University	Thohoyandou
15:00	M.Ngele 7'; T.Mngcwango 59' 81'; T.Khutlang 90+2'			Stadium: Thohoyandou Stadium

5 February 2020	Chippa United	3–0	TS Galaxy	Port Elizabeth
19:30	R.Gamildien 63'; A.Chidi Kwem 74' 89'			Stadium: Nelson Mandela Bay Stadium

11 February 2020	Polokwane City	0–1	Baroka	Polokwane
19:30			M.Nxumalo 74'	Stadium: Peter Mokaba Stadium

9 February 2020	Mbombela United	1–0	Cape Town City	Mbombela
15:00 SAST	J.Figuaredo 36'			Stadium: KaNyamazane Stadium

8 February 2020	Mamelodi Sundowns	1–0	SuperSport United	Pretoria
20:15	S.Vilakazi 24'			Stadium: Loftus Versfeld Stadium

8 February 2020	Bloemfontein Celtic	4–1	AmaZulu	Bloemfontein
15:00	M.Morton 45+3' (o.g.); N.Letlabika 66'; T.Njoti 84'; N.Maema 89' (pen.)		T.Chawapiwa 34'	Stadium: Dr.Petrus Molemela Stadium

8 February 2020	Vaal University	2–2 (6–5 p)	Lamontville Golden Arrows	Dobsonville Stadium
15:30	Mawelewele 4'; Hlongwane 88'	Report	Makondo 11' (o.g.); Gumede 86'
	Penalties
	Sibisi (penalty scored); Chesane (penalty scored); Hlongwane (penalty scored); Lekalaka (penalty scored); Mawelewele (penalty scored); Naane (penalty scored)		Shitolo (penalty scored); Conco (penalty scored); Gumede (penalty scored); Parusnath (penalty scored); Lunga (penalty scored); Mtshali (penalty missed)

9 February 2020	Orlando Pirates	3–3 (a.e.t.) (2–3 p)	Bidvest Wits	Johannesburg
15:00	T.Lorch 69'; H.Jele 74'; Z.Lepasa 105+4' (pen.)	32-match-report-maritzbur	Evanga 28' (pen.); D.Hotto 45'; G.Motupa 120+1'	Stadium: Orlando Stadium
	Penalties
	H.Jele (penalty scored); L.Memela (penalty missed); T.Lorch (penalty scored); K.Dlamini (penalty missed)		G.Motupa (penalty scored); T.Monare (penalty missed); T.Hlatshwayo (penalty missed); P.Nange (penalty scored); L.Gordinho (penalty scored)

7 February 2020	Stellenbosch	2–2 (4–5 p)	Maritzburg United	Cape Town
20:00	M Matsi 9'; L.Skelem 27'		T.Kutumela 22' (pen.) 45'	Stadium: Athlone Stadium
	Penalties
	I.Rayners (penalty scored); R.Johannes (penalty scored); N.Sinkala (penalty missed); G.Scott (penalty scored); B. De Jong (penalty scored); N.Mobbie (penalty missed)		S.Xulu (penalty scored); Y.Jappie (penalty scored); C.Augusto (penalty scored); D.Claasen (penalty scored); M.Timm (penalty missed); K.Mngonyama (penalty scored)

== Last 16 ==
22 February 2020	Happy Wanderers	3–4 (a.e.t.)	TS Sporting	Princess Magogo Stadium
15:00	M.Mazibuko 82' 112' (pen.); S.Mkhwanazi 88'		H.Moyo 5'; M.Wagaba 10' (pen.); K.Sithole 101' 120+1'

23 February 2020	Baroka	2–2 (4–2 p)	Hungry Lions	Peter Mokaba Stadium, Polokwane
15:00	E.Makgopa 48'; Kambala 102'		S.Ngubane 35' (o.g.); E.Sampson 95' (o.g.)
	Penalties
	G.Phiri (penalty scored); B.Makume (penalty scored); K.Selemela (penalty scored); I.Mahangwahaya (penalty scored)		(penalty scored) M.Tau; (penalty missed) R.Ramatlhapeng; (penalty missed) J.Arendse; (penalty scored) T.Chimuku

9 February 2020	Mbombela United	1–2	Real Kings	KaNyamazane Stadium; Mbombela
15:00	P.Sekome 33'		L.Stoffels 16'; D.Brown 90+3'

22 February 2020	Highlands Park	1–1 (5–4 p)	Kaizer Chiefs	Makhulong Stadium, Jo'burg
15:00	P.Shalulile 57'		S.Motsepe 63' (o.g.)
	Penalties
	L.Mzava (penalty scored); L.Mbatha (penalty scored); R.Ramagalela (penalty missed); P.Shalulile (penalty scored); B.Fransman (penalty scored); M.Nyatama (penalty scored)		D.Cardoso (penalty scored); E.Mathoho (penalty scored); L.Manyama (penalty scored); G.Maluleka (penalty missed); W.Katsande (penalty scored); Khama Billiat (penalty missed)

21 February 2020	Black Leopards	2–0	Amavarara	Thohoyandou Stadium, Thohoyandou
20:00	L.Kapinga 9'; T.Ndlovu 26'

24 February 2020	Bidvest Wits	2–0	Chippa United
19:30	T.Hlatshwayo 27'; P.Nange 29'

23 February 2020	Mamelodi Sundowns	2–0	Vaal University	Pretoria
15:00	W.Arendse 53'; P.Mahlambi 70'			Stadium: Lucas Masterpieces Moripe Stadium

22 February 2020	Bloemfontein Celtic	3–2	Maritzburg United	Bloemfontein
20:15 C.A.T	T.Njoti 24'; M.Ramasimong 62'; H.Tchilimbou 90+4'		T.Kutumela 17'; K.Mngonyama 90'	Stadium: Dr.Petrus Molemela Stadium

== Quarter-finals ==
14 March 2020
15:00

TS Sporting	1–1 (a.e.t.)	Bloemfontein Celtic
Chico 79'		S.Letsoalo 55'
Penalties
R.Versuur (penalty missed); H.Moyo (penalty missed); P.Nkabinde (penalty scored); K.Sithole (penalty scored); O.Masuluke (penalty missed)	2–3	(penalty missed) T.Khasipe; (penalty scored) N.Maema; (penalty scored) S Letsoalo; (penalty scored) N Mabena

KaNyamazane Stadium
Mbombela
MP
14 March 2020
20:00

Real Kings	0–4	Bidvest Wits
		43'Evanga; 51'L.Gordinho; 51', 68' T.Dzvukamanja

Sugar Ray Xulu Stadium,
Durban, KZN
14 March 2020

Highlands Park	0–1 (a.e.t.)	Mamelodi Sundowns
		126'K.Makgalwa

Makhulong Stadium, Johannesburg
4 March 2020
15:00

Baroka	1–0	Black Leopards
J.Douhadji 80' (o.g.)

Peter Mokaba Stadium, Polokwane

== Semi-final ==
8 August 2020
14:00 SAST

Baroka	0–3	Bloemfontein Celtic
Gebhardt (red card) 32'	Kick Off; Soccerway	Mabena 45+5'; Letsoalo 83' (pen.), 90+4'

Orlando Stadium, Johannesburg
Attendance: 0
Referee: Victor Hlungwani
8 August 2020
19:15 SAST

Mamelodi Sundowns	3–2	Bidvest Wits
Nascimento 37' (pen.); Makgalwa 81'; Lakay 90+5'	Soccerway	Dzvukamanja 76', 86'

Orlando Stadium, Johannesburg
Attendance: 0
Referee: Luxulo Badi

== Final ==
12 September 2020
20:00 SAST

Bloemfontein Celtic	0–1	Mamelodi Sundowns
	Report	Sirino 80'

Orlando Stadium, Johannesburg
Attendance: 0
Referee: Jelly Chavani

== Statistics ==
=== Top scorer ===
No#	Name	Clubs	Goals
1	(South Africa) Terrence Dzvukamanja	Bidvest Wits	4
2	(South Africa) Thabiso Kutumela	Maritzburg United	3
2	(Namibia) Peter Shalulile	Highlands Park	3
2	(South Africa) Mxolisi Mazibuko		3
