= Barro =

Barro (Spanish and Portuguese for mud or clay) may refer to:

== Arts, entertainment, and media ==
- Barro Humano, a 1929 Brazilian film
- El Dios de barro, a 1970 Mexican telenovela
- Entre el barro, a 1939 Argentine musical film
- Barro, a 1951 Honduran novel by Paca Navas

== People ==
- Aboubacar Barro (born 1991), Burkinabé professional footballer
- Adama Barro (born 1996), Burkinabé international footballer
- Analyn Barro (born 1996), Filipina actress and model
- Andrés do Barro (1947–1989), Spanish singer-songwriter
- Joaquín Barro (born 2001), Argentinian professional football player
- Josh Barro (born 1984), American journalist
- Juan Barro (born 1956), Spanish former swimmer
- Oumar Barro (born 1974), Burkinabé former professional football player
- Ousmane Barro (born 1984), Senegalese professional basketball player
- Robert Barro (born 1944), American classical liberal macroeconomist

== Places ==
=== Europe ===
- Barro, Charente, France, a commune
- Barrô (Águeda), Aveiro, Portugal, a civil parish
- Barro (Llanes), Asturias, Spain, a civil parish
- Barro, Galicia, Spain, a municipality
- Gejuelo del Barro, Castile and León, Spain, a village and municipality

=== North America ===
- Barro, Utah, United States, a ghost town
- Barro Blanco Dam, a gravity dam on the Tabasara River in Chiriqui, Panama
- Barro Colorado Island, Panama, an island in the Panama Canal

=== South America ===
- Barro, Ceará, Brazil, a municipality
- Barro Alto, Bahia, Brazil, a municipality
- Barro Alto, Goiás, Brazil, a municipality
- Barro Negro (volcano), a scoria cone in Jujuy, Argentina
- Barro Preto, Bahia, Brazil, a municipality

== Other uses ==
- Barro negro pottery, a type of black pottery from Mexico

== See also ==
- Barros
- Barrow (disambiguation)
