= Makaya =

Makaya is a given name and surname. Notable people with the name include:

== Given name ==
- Makaya McCraven (born 1983), American jazz drummer and bandleader
- Makaya Nsilulu (born 1977), DR Congo footballer
- Makaya Ntshoko (born 1939), South African drummer

== Surname ==
- Francis Makaya (born 1975), Congolese footballer
- Françoise Makaya, Gabonese politician
- Henrino Makaya, Congolese footballer
- Julienne Mavoungou Makaya, Congolese politician
- Paulin Makaya (born 1966), Congolese politician

== Other ==
- Monte Makaya, a steel, looping roller coaster at Terra Encantada in Rio de Janeiro, Brazil
