= Mbah =

Mbah is both a given name and a surname. Notable people with the name include:

- Mbah Gotho (died 2017), known for unvalidated extreme claim of longevity
- Mbah Koné (born 1990), Burkina Faso footballer
- Mbah Maridjan (1927?–2010), spiritual guardian of the Indonesian volcano Mount Merapi
- Mbah Surip (1949–2009), Indonesian singer
- Chigozie Mbah (born 1997), Nigerian footballer
- Chimezie Mbah (born 1992), Nigerian footballer
- David Mbah, Nigerian engineer
- Grace Oluchi Mbah (born 1994), Nigerian activist
- Ivo Mbah (died 2018), Ambazonian general
- Peter Mbah born 1972), Nigerian lawyer
- Sam Mbah (1963–2014), Nigerian author
- Luc Mbah a Moute (born 1986), Cameroonian basketball player
- Joseph Mbah Ndam, Cameroonian politician
