= Sanou =

Sanou is a surname of Burkinabé origin. People with this surname include:

- Aliassou Sanou (born 1988), Burkinabé footballer
- Bernadette Sanou Dao (born 1952), Burkinabé author and politician
- Dieudonné Sanou, Burkinabé footballer
- Firmin Sanou (born 1973), Burkinabé footballer
- Germain Sanou (born 1992), Burkinabé footballer
- Gervais Sanou (born 1985), Burkinabé footballer
- Idrissa Sanou (born 1977), Burkinabé athlete
- Issouf Sanou (born 1979), Burkinabé footballer
- Lazare Sanou, Burkinabé footballer
- Mathurin Sanou, Burkinabé footballer
- Ousmane Sanou (born 1978), Burkinabé footballer
- Roland Sanou (born 1983), Burkinabé footballer
- Salif Sanou (born 1967), Burkinabé footballer
- Sibiri Sanou (born 1998), Burkinabé footballer
- Valéry Sanou (born 1989), Burkinabé footballer
- Wilfried Sanou (born 1984), Burkinabé footballer
- Worokia Sanou (born 1989), Burkinabé athlete
- Yaya Sanou (born 1993), Burkinabé footballer
- Youssouf Sanou (born 1987), Burkinabé footballer
