= Samaké =

Samaké is a Malian surname that may refer to

- Abdoulaye Samaké (born 1987), Malian football goalkeeper
- Issaka Samaké (born 1994), Malian football defender
- Lassana Samaké (born 1992), Malian football midfielder
- Soumaila Samake (born 1978), Malian basketball player
- Yaya Samaké (born 1987), Malian football midfielder
- Yeah Samake (born 1969), Malian entrepreneur and politician
