= Getnet =

Getnet or Getent is both an Ethiopian masculine given name and surname. Notable people with the name include:

== Given name ==
- Getnet Wale (born 2000), Ethiopian steeplechase

== Surname ==
- Meron Getnet, Ethiopian actress, journalist and activist
- Tariku Getnet (born 1994), Ethiopian footballer
- Tigest Getent (born 1997), Ethiopian-born Bahraini steeplechase runner
