= Ikechukwu (name) =

- Gender: Male
- Language: Igbo

Origin
- Origin: Igbo
- Meaning: God's power
- Region of origin: Igboland

Other names
- Variant forms: Ikechi, Ikeolisa
- Short form: Ike

Ikechukwu audio is a given name and surname of Igbo origin in Nigeria which means "God's power". In Igbo, “Ike” means power and “chukwu” means God. There is also the name Ikechi and Ikeolisa, with the same meaning.

== Notable people with the name include ==
- Ikechukwu, Nigerian singer, rapper, and actor
- Ikechukwu Amaechi (born 1967), Nigerian journalist and columnist
- Ikechukwu Dozie (born 1966), Nigerian microbiologist and university teacher
- Ikechukwu Emetu (born 1985), Nigerian engineer and politician
- Ikechukwu Ezeh (born 1987), Nigerian footballer
- Ikechukwu Ezenwa (born 1988), Nigerian footballer
- Ikechukwu Gabriel, Nigerian professional footballer
- Ikechukwu Kalu (born 1984), Nigerian footballer
- Ikechukwu Nwamu (born 1993), American basketball player
- Ikechukwu Obichukwu, Nigerian Paralympic powerlifter
- Ikechukwu Obiorah (born 1961), Nigerian politician
- Ikechukwu Ofoegbu (born 1984), American basketball player
- Ikechukwu Okorie (born 1993), Nigerian footballer
- Ikechukwu Francis Okoronkwo (born 1970), Nigerian visual artist
- Ikechukwu Onyeka, Nigerian film director
- Ikechukwu Uche (born 1984), Nigerian footballer
- Ikechukwu Ufomadu, American comedian, actor, and writer

== Surname ==
- Francis Ikechukwu (born 1989), Nigerian footballer
- Kenneth Ikechukwu (born 1993), Nigerian footballer
- Obie Etie Ikechukwu (born 1987), Nigerian footballer
