= Tiendrébéogo =

Tiendrébéogo is a Burkinabé surname. Notable people with the surname include:

- Irène Tiendrébéogo (born 1977), Burkinabé-Monegasque high jumper
- Ilias Tiendrébéogo (born 1992), Burkinabé footballer
- Josué Tiendrébéogo (born 2004), Burkinabé footballer
