= Kisekka =

Kisekka is a Ugandan surname. Notable people with the surname include:

- Frank Kisekka (born 1926), Ugandan boxer
- Ronnie Kisekka (born 1993), Ugandan footballer
- Samson Kisekka (1912–1999), Ugandan politician
