= Issouf =

Issouf is a West African masculine given name and surname, a Francized form of Yusuf, the Arabic form of Joseph. Notable people with the given name include:

== Given name ==
- Issouf Ag Maha (born 1962), Nigerien writer
- Issouf Compaoré (born 1988), Burkinabé footballer
- Issouf Kaboré (born 1985), Burkinabé footballer
- Issouf Macalou (born 1998), Ivorian footballer
- Issouf Ouattara (born 1988), Burkinabé footballer
- Issouf Paro (born 1994), Burkinabé footballer
- Issouf Sissokho (born 2002), Malian footballer
- Issouf Sanou (born 1979), Burkinabé footballer
- Issouf Sosso (born 1996), Burkinabé footballer

== Surname ==
- Jeanine Assani Issouf (born 1992), French athlete

== See also ==
- Issoufou, a cognate
