= Ntege =

Ntege is a surname. Notable people with the surname include:

- Ivan Ntege (born 1994), Ugandan footballer
- Monica Azuba Ntege (c.1954–2026), Ugandan politician and engineer
