= Barro Negro =

Barro Negro may refer to:

- Barro negro pottery
- Barro Negro Tunebo language
- Barro Negro (volcano)
