= Issoufou =

Issoufou is a surname and given name. Notable people with the surname include:

== Given name ==
- Issoufou Assoumane, Nigerien politician and ministers of council
- Issoufou Boubacar Garba (born 1990), Nigerien footballer
- Issoufou Dayo (born 1991), Burkina Faso footballer
- Issoufou Habou (born 1945), Nigerien light-middleweight boxer
- Issoufou Saidou-Djermakoye (1920– 2000), Nigerien politician
- Issoufou Sidibé, Nigerien labour leader and politician
- Ousmane Issoufou Oubandawaki (born 1948), Nigerien politician

== Surname ==
- Abdoul Razak Issoufou (born 1994), Nigerien taekwondo practitioner
- Alhassane Issoufou (born 1981), Nigerien footballer
- Aissata Issoufou Mahamadou, Nigerien chemist, chemical engineer, mining specialist, healthcare advocate and First Lady of Niger
- Boubacar Idrissa Issoufou (born 197), Nigerien footballer
- Lalla Malika Issoufou (born 1975), Nigerien medical doctor, patron of many charities and First Lady of Niger
- Mahamadou Issoufou (born 1952), Nigerien politician, President of Niger
- Yanis Issoufou (born 2006), French footballer

== See also ==
- Issouf, a cognate
