= Fantu =

Fantu is an Ethiopian given name and surname. Notable people with the name include:

- Fantu Magiso (born 1992), Ethiopian middle-distance runner
- Fantu Worku (born 1999), Ethiopian middle-distance runner
- Manaye Fantu (born 1990), Ethiopian football forward
