= Okwi =

Okwi is a surname. Notable people with the surname include:

- Emmanuel Okwi (born 1992), Ugandan footballer
- Simon Okwi (born 1993), Ugandan footballer
