= Dereje Alemu =

Ethiopian professional footballer

Personal information
- Date of birth: 30 April 1990 (age 36)
- Place of birth: Ethiopia
- Position: Goalkeeper

International career^{‡}
Years	Team	Apps	(Gls)
2013	Ethiopia	3	(0)
- ‡ National team caps and goals as of 21 May 2017

Dereje Alemu is an Ethiopian professional footballer, who plays as a goalkeeper for Muger Cement.

== International career ==
In January 2014, coach Sewnet Bishaw, invited him to be a part of the Ethiopia squad for the 2014 African Nations Championship. The team was eliminated in the group stages after losing to Congo, Libya and Ghana.
