= Léopold Nkurikiye =

Burundian footballer

Personal information
- Date of birth: 5 December 1989 (age 36)
- Position: Defender

Team information
- Current team: Vital'O F.C.

Léopold Nkurikiye is a Burundian professional footballer who plays as a defender for Vital'O F.C. in the Burundi Football League.

== International career ==
He was invited by Lofty Naseem, the national team coach, to represent Burundi in the 2014 African Nations Championship held in South Africa.
