= Mentesenot Adane =

Ethiopian footballer

Personal information
- Date of birth: 28 May 1993 (age 33)
- Place of birth: Addis Ababa, Ethiopia
- Position: Midfielder

Team information
- Current team: Saint George

Senior career*
| Years | Team | Apps | (Gls) |
- Saint George

International career^{‡}
| 2013– | Ethiopia | 15 | (0) |
- * Club domestic league appearances and goals ‡ National team caps and goals as of 2 December 2020

Mentesenot Adane (born 28 May 1993) is an Ethiopian footballer who plays as a midfielder for Saint George S.C.

== International career ==
In January 2014, coach Sewnet Bishaw, invited him to be a part of the Ethiopia squad for the 2014 African Nations Championship. The team was eliminated in the group stages after losing to Congo, Libya and Ghana.
