= Abdoul Kader Kobré =

Burkinabe footballer (born 1996)

Abdoul Kobré
Personal information
- Full name: Abdoul Kader Kobré
- Date of birth: 23 August 1996 (age 30)
- Place of birth: Burkina Faso
- Position: Goalkeeper

Team information
- Current team: Majestic FC

Abdoul Kader Kobré (born 23 August 1996) is a Burkinabe professional footballer, who plays as a goalkeeper for Majestic FC and the Burkina Faso national team.

== International career ==
In January 2014, coach Brama Traore, invited him to be a part of the Burkina Faso squad for the 2014 African Nations Championship. The team was eliminated in the group stages after losing to Uganda and Zimbabwe and then drawing with Morocco.
