= Taddele Mengesha =

Ethiopian footballer

Tadele Mengesha
Personal information
- Date of birth: 11 September 1992 (age 34)
- Place of birth: Arba Minch, Ethiopia
- Position: Midfielder

Team information
- Current team: Arba Minch FC.

International career
Years	Team	Apps	(Gls)
2014–	Ethiopia		

Tadele Mengesha is an Ethiopian professional footballer, who plays as a midfielder for Sebeta City.

== International career ==
In January 2014, coach Sewnet Bishaw, invited him to be a part of the Ethiopia squad for the 2014 African Nations Championship. The team was eliminated in the group stages after losing to Congo, Libya and Ghana.
