= Biyadiglign Elyas =

Ethiopian footballer

Personal information
- Date of birth: 24 May 1988 (age 38)
- Place of birth: Ethiopia
- Position: Defender

Team information
- Current team: Saint George F.C.

Senior career*
| Years | Team | Apps | (Gls) |
| 2013– | Saint George F.C. | | |

International career
| 2011– | Ethiopia | | |
- * Club domestic league appearances and goals

Biyadiglign Elyas is an Ethiopian professional footballer who plays as a defender for Saint George F.C.

== International career ==
In January 2014, coach Sewnet Bishaw, invited him to be a part of the Ethiopia squad for the 2014 African Nations Championship. The team was eliminated in the group stages after losing to Congo, Libya and Ghana.
