= Stéphane Rugonumugabo =

Burundian footballer

Personal information
- Date of birth: 12 December 1990 (age 35)
- Position: Defender

Team information
- Current team: LLB Académic FC

Stéphane Rugonumugabo is a Burundian professional footballer who plays as a defender for LLB Académic FC in the Burundi Football League.

== International career ==
He was invited by Lofty Naseem, the national team coach, to represent Burundi in the 2014 African Nations Championship held in South Africa.
