= Elizée Demankel =

Burkinabé footballer

Personal information
- Full name: Elizée Demankel To
- Date of birth: 14 June 1989 (age 37)
- Place of birth: Burkina Faso
- Position: Midfielder

Team information
- Current team: ASFA Yennenga

Elizée Demankel (born 14 June 1989) is a Burkina Faso professional footballer, who plays as a midfielder for ASFA Yennenga and the Burkina Faso national football team.

== International career ==
In January 2014, coach Brama Traore, invited him to be a part of the Burkina Faso squad for the 2014 African Nations Championship. The team was eliminated in the group stages after losing to Uganda and Zimbabwe and then drawing with Morocco.
