= Valentin Zoungrana =

Burkina Faso footballer

Personal information
- Date of birth: 30 October 1992 (age 33)
- Place of birth: Brazzaville, Republic of the Congo
- Position: Midfielder

Team information
- Current team: AS SONABEL

Valentin Zoungrana is a Burkinabe professional footballer who plays as a midfielder for AS SONABEL and the Burkina Faso national football team.

== International career ==
In January 2014, coach Brama Traore, invited him to be a part of the Burkina Faso squad for the 2014 African Nations Championship. The team was eliminated in the group stages after losing to Uganda and Zimbabwe and then drawing with Morocco.
