= Saidi Tama Nduwimana =

Burundian footballer

Personal information
- Date of birth: 6 June 1989 (age 37)
- Position: Goalkeeper

Team information
- Current team: AS Inter Star

Senior career*
Years	Team	Apps	(Gls)
200x–2013	Atlético Olympic Bujumbura		
2013–	AS Inter Star		

International career
2011–	Burundi	3	(0)
- * Club domestic league appearances and goals

Saidi Tama Nduwimana (born 6 June 1989) is a Burundian professional footballer, who plays as a goalkeeper for AS Inter Star in the Burundi Football League.

== International career ==
He made his international debut for Burundi in 2011. He was invited by Lofty Naseem, the national team coach, to represent Burundi in the 2014 African Nations Championship held in South Africa.
