= Rashid Léon Harerimana =

Burundian footballer

Rashid Harerimana
Personal information
- Full name: Rashid Léon Harerimana
- Date of birth: 14 March 1994 (age 32)
- Place of birth: Bujumbura, Burundi
- Height: 1.68 m (5 ft 6 in)
- Position: Defender

Team information
- Current team: A.S. Kigali

Senior career*
Years	Team	Apps	(Gls)
2012–2018	LLB Académic		
2018–	A.S. Kigali		

International career^{‡}
2013–	Burundi	31	(0)
- * Club domestic league appearances and goals as of 07:35, 8 June 2020 (UTC) ‡ National team caps and goals as of 07:35, 8 June 2020 (UTC)

Rashid Harerimana is a Burundian professional footballer, who plays as a defender for A.S. Kigali and for the Burundi national football team.

== International career ==
He was invited by Lofty Naseem, the national team coach, to represent Burundi in the 2014 African Nations Championship held in South Africa.
