= Ousséni Yéyé =

Burkina Faso footballer

Personal information
- Date of birth: 8 January 1987 (age 39)
- Place of birth: Burkina Faso
- Position: Defender

Senior career*
| Years | Team | Apps | (Gls) |
| 2009–2016 | Union Sportive des Forces Armées | | |

International career
| 2012 | Burkina Faso | 3 | (0) |
- * Club domestic league appearances and goals

Ousséni Yéyé (born 8 January 1987) is a Burkina Faso former professional footballer who played as a defender for Union Sportive des Forces Armées and the Burkina Faso national football team.

== International career ==
In January 2014, coach Brama Traore, invited him to be a part of the Burkina Faso squad for the 2014 African Nations Championship. The team was eliminated in the group stages after losing to Uganda and Zimbabwe and then drawing with Morocco.
