= Jean Gentil Nduwimana =

Burundian footballer

Jean Nduwimana
Personal information
- Full name: Jean Gentil Nduwimana
- Date of birth: 13 January 1986 (age 40)
- Position: Forward

Team information
- Current team: Olympic Star

Jean Gentil Nduwimana is a Burundian professional footballer who plays as a forward for Olympic Star in the Burundi Football League.

== International career ==
He was invited by Lofty Naseem, the national team coach, to represent Burundi in the 2014 African Nations Championship held in South Africa.
