= Jean-Claude Ndarusanze =

Burundian footballer

Personal information
- Full name: Jean-Claude Meyong
- Date of birth: 20 June 1988 (age 38)
- Position: Forward

Team information
- Current team: LLB Académic FC

International career^{‡}
Years	Team	Apps	(Gls)
2013–	Burundi	15	(2)
- ‡ National team caps and goals as of 16 March 2017

Jean-Claude Ndarusanze is a Burundian professional footballer who plays as a forward for LLB Académic FC in the Burundi Football League. He was topscorer in the 2017–18 Rwanda Premier League with 15 goals, when played for APR F.C.

== International career ==
He was invited by Lofty Naseem, the national team coach, to represent Burundi in the 2014 African Nations Championship held in South Africa.

=== International goals ===
Scores and results list Burundi's goal tally first.

No	Date	Venue	Opponent	Score	Result	Competition
1.	11 March 2017	Prince Louis Rwagasore Stadium, Bujumbura, Burundi	Djibouti	2–0	7–0	Friendly
2.	11 March 2017	Prince Louis Rwagasore Stadium, Bujumbura, Burundi	Djibouti	4–0	7–0	Friendly
