= Laré Mohamed Diarra =

Burkinabe footballer (born 1990)

Laré Diarra
Personal information
- Full name: Laré Mohamed Diarra
- Date of birth: 19 March 1990 (age 36)
- Place of birth: Burkina Faso
- Position: Goalkeeper

Team information
- Current team: Royal FC Bobo-Dioulasso

Senior career*
Years	Team	Apps	(Gls)
2011–2012	Rail Club du Kadiogo		
2013	ASFA Yennenga		
2013–2014	AS SONABEL		
2014–2017	Rail Club du Kadiogo		
2018–2020	Royal FC Bobo-Dioulasso		
2020–2021	Kiko FC		
2021–	Royal FC Bobo-Dioulasso	64	(0)

International career
2009–2013	Burkina Faso	4	(0)
- * Club domestic league appearances and goals as of 1 July 2024

Laré Mohamed Diarra (born 19 March 1990) is a Burkinabe professional footballer, who plays as a goalkeeper for Royal FC Bobo-Dioulasso. He made four appearances for the Burkina Faso national team.

== International career ==
In January 2014, coach Brama Traore, invited him to be a part of the Burkina Faso squad for the 2014 African Nations Championship. The team was eliminated in the group stages after losing to Uganda and Zimbabwe and then drawing with Morocco.
