= Boubacar Nimi =

Burkinabe footballer (born 1982)

Personal information
- Date of birth: 20 February 1988 (age 38)
- Place of birth: Ouagadougou, Burkina Faso
- Position: Forward

Senior career*
Years	Team	Apps	(Gls)
- EF Ouagadougou
- * Club domestic league appearances and goals

Boubacar Nimi (born 20 February 1988) is a Burkinabe former professional footballer who played as a forward for EF Ouagadougou.

== International career ==
In January 2014, coach Brama Traore invited him to be a part of the Burkina Faso squad for the 2014 African Nations Championship. The team was eliminated in the group stages after losing to Uganda and Zimbabwe and drawing with Morocco.
