= Thok James =

Ethiopian footballer

Personal information
- Full name: Thok James Galwak
- Date of birth: 2 July 1994 (age 32)
- Place of birth: Gambela, Ethiopia
- Position: Defender

Team information
- Current team: CBE SA
- Number: 6

Senior career*
Years	Team	Apps	(Gls)
2012–2015	Ethiopian Coffee		
2016–2017	CBE SA		
2017–2018	Mekelle 70 Enderta		

International career
2013–2014	Ethiopia	8	(0)
- * Club domestic league appearances and goals

Thok James (born 2 July 1994) is an Ethiopian footballer, who plays as a defender for CBE SA.

== International career ==
In January 2014, coach Sewnet Bishaw, invited him to be a part of the Ethiopian squad for the 2014 African Nations Championship. The team was eliminated in the group stages after losing to Congo, Libya and Ghana.
