= Yussuf Ndikumana =

Burundian footballer

Personal information
- Full name: Yussuf Lule Ndikumana
- Date of birth: 1 July 1993 (age 33)
- Place of birth: Burundi
- Position: Defender

Team information
- Current team: LLB Académic FC

Senior career*
| Years | Team | Apps | (Gls) |
| 2013– | LLB Académic FC | | |

International career
| 2014 | Burundi | 3 | (0) |
- * Club domestic league appearances and goals

Yussuf Lule Ndikumana (born 1 July 1993) is a Burundian professional footballer who plays as a defender for LLB Académic FC in the Burundi Football League.

== International career ==
He was invited by Lofty Naseem, the national team coach, to represent Burundi in the 2014 African Nations Championship held in South Africa.
