= Umar Zango =

Nigerian footballer

Personal information
- Date of birth: 23 February 1994 (age 32)
- Place of birth: Kaduna, Nigeria
- Position: Defender

Team information
- Current team: Nigeria Kano Pillars

Umar Zango is a Nigerian professional footballer who plays as a defender for Kano Pillars.

== International career ==
In January 2014, coach Stephen Keshi, invited him to be included in the Nigeria 23-man team for the 2014 African Nations Championship. He helped the team defeat Zimbabwe for a third-place finish by a goal to nil.
