= Seth Parusnath =

South African soccer player

Personal information
- Full name: Brandon Seth Parusnath
- Date of birth: 30 August 1994 (age 32)
- Place of birth: Durban, South Africa
- Height: 1.72 m (5 ft 7 1/2 in)
- Position: Midfielder

Senior career*
Years	Team	Apps	(Gls)
2014–2021	Lamontville Golden Arrows	62	(4)
2021–2023	Sekhukhune United	16	(1)
- * Club domestic league appearances and goals as of 14 October 2024

Seth Parusnath (born 30 August 1994) is a South African soccer player who played as a midfielder for Lamontville Golden Arrows and Sekhukhune United.

In 2021 he was set on leaving Lamontville Golden Arrows. He trained with SuperSport United during the summer, before Kaizer Chiefs signalled their interest. According to Parusnath, his agent "took the decision" that it "was in my best interest" to decline the offer to go on trial with Kaizer Chiefs. Parusnath remained clubless until September 2021 when he joined Sekhukhune United. The stay at Sekhukhune United was not very successful, and in 2023 he was a free agent again. A move back to Golden Arrows was talked about.

He has a twin brother, Kaleb Parusnath, who played once for Golden Arrows.
