= Gabito =

Mozambican footballer

Personal information
- Full name: Gabriel Macuvele
- Date of birth: 4 February 1981 (age 45)
- Place of birth: Maputo, Mozambique
- Height: 1.87 m (6 ft 2 in)
- Position: Defender

Team information
- Current team: Maxaquene
- Number: 3

Senior career*
Years	Team	Apps	(Gls)
2000–2003	Costa do Sol		
2003–2005	Al-Hilal Club		
2005–2009	Atlético Muçulmano		
2009–2010	Liga Muçulmana		
2010–	Maxaquene		

International career^{‡}
2004–	Mozambique	9	(0)
- * Club domestic league appearances and goals ‡ National team caps and goals as of 15 December 2012

Gabriel Macuvele, commonly known as Gabito (born 4 February 1981), is a Mozambican footballer who plays for Moçambola side C.D. Maxaquene and the Mozambican national football team as a defender.

Gabito started his career in 2000 at the age of 19. He has played for several clubs in Mozambique which include Costa do Sol, Atlético Muçulmano and Liga Muçulmana. Macuvele had a stint abroad in Sudan from 2003 to 2005 playing for Al-Hilal Club.
