= Françoise Makaya =

Gabonese politician

Françoise Makaya is a Gabonese politician. She is a member of the Gabonese Democratic Party (Parti démocratique gabonais, PDG) and a Deputy in the National Assembly of Gabon.

Following the death of President Omar Bongo in June 2009, Makaya said in reference to the succession of Senate President Rose Francine Rogombe: "We saw the [swearing in] ceremony with some satisfaction because she's a woman but there was also plenty of emotion and tears because of the president's death".
