= Juan Barro =

Spanish swimmer

Personal information
- Born: November 21, 1956 (age 69)

Sport
- Sport: Swimming

Juan Barro (born 21 November 1956) is a Spanish former freestyle swimmer who competed in the 1980 Summer Olympics.
