= Aboubacar Barro =

Burkinabe footballer

Personal information
- Date of birth: 10 January 1991 (age 35)
- Place of birth: Ouagadougou, Burkina Faso
- Position: Midfielder

Team information
- Current team: Étoile Filante de Ouagadougou

Aboubacar Barro is a Burkina Faso professional footballer, who plays as a midfielder for Étoile Filante de Ouagadougou and the Burkina Faso national football team.

== International career ==
In January 2014, coach Brama Traore, invited him to be a part of the Burkina Faso squad for the 2014 African Nations Championship. The team was eliminated in the group stages after losing to Uganda and Zimbabwe and then drawing with Morocco.
