= Yasser Mugerwa =

Ugandan footballer (born 1994)

Yassar Mugerwa
Personal information
- Date of birth: 1 May 1994 (age 32)
- Place of birth: Uganda
- Position: Midfielder

Team information
- Current team: EXPRESS FC

Youth career
- Supercubs Soccer Academy

Senior career*
Years	Team	Apps	(Gls)
2013–2015	URA	7	(2)
2015–2016	Orlando Pirates	6	(0)
2016–2017	Saint George		(8)
2017–	Fasil Kenema		(6)
2020–2020	Sidama Buna		
2024-	Express		

International career^{‡}
2013–	Uganda	7	(0)
- * Club domestic league appearances and goals ‡ National team caps and goals as of 7 February 2018

Yassar Mugerwa is a Ugandan professional footballer who plays as a midfielder for EXPRESS FC.

== International career ==
In January 2014, coach Milutin Sedrojevic, invited him to be included in the Uganda national football team for the 2014 African Nations Championship. The team placed third in the group stage of the competition after beating Burkina Faso, drawing with Zimbabwe and losing to Morocco.
