= Ilias Tiendrébéogo =

Burkinabe footballer (born 1992)

Personal information
- Date of birth: 8 April 1992 (age 34)
- Place of birth: Bobo-Dioulasso, Burkina Faso
- Height: 1.75 m (5 ft 9 in)
- Position: Forward

Team information
- Current team: AS SONABEL

Senior career*
Years	Team	Apps	(Gls)
2011–2012	AS SONABEL		
2012–2014	ASFA Yennenga		
2014–2015	Africa Sports d'Abidjan		
2015–	AS SONABEL		

International career
2012–2021	Burkina Faso	9	(0)
- * Club domestic league appearances and goals

Ilias Tiendrébéogo (born 8 April 1992) is a Burkinabe professional footballer, who plays as a forward for AS SONABEL and the Burkina Faso national football team.

== International career ==
In January 2014, coach Brama Traore, invited him to be a part of the Burkina Faso squad for the 2014 African Nations Championship. The team was eliminated in the group stages after losing to Uganda and Zimbabwe and then drawing with Morocco.
