= Paulin Makaya =

Congolese politician (born 1966)

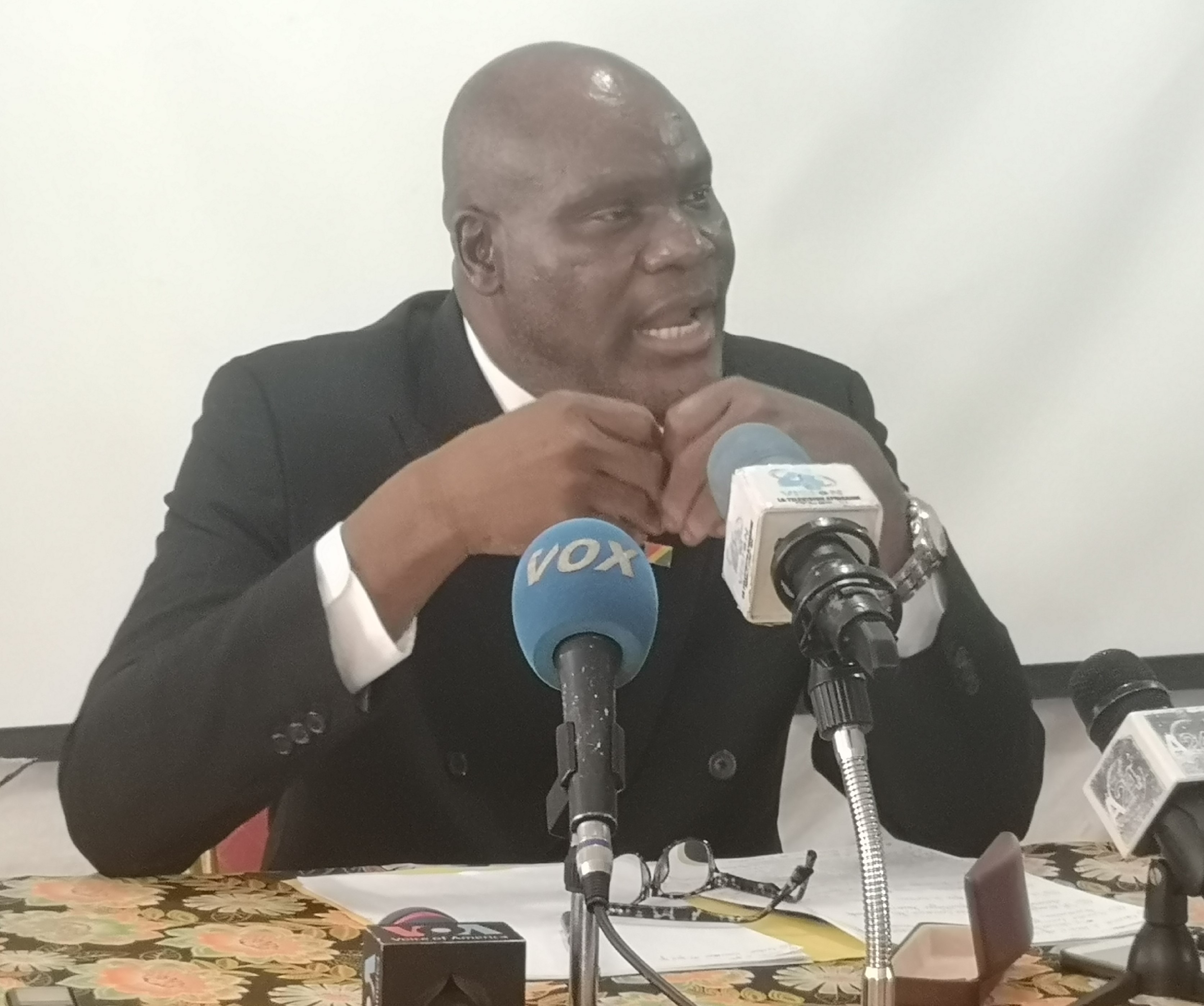
- Makaya in 2021
- Born: 1966 (age 59–60); Brazzaville, Republic of the Congo
- Education: Université de Brazzaville; University of Westminster
- Occupation: Politician

Paulin Makaya (born 1966) is a Congolese politician. A former collaborator of Bernard Kolélas, he was the founding president of “United for the Congo” (Unis pour le Congo: UPC), an opposition party.

Makaya left the country for exile after the civil war of 1997, and returned to Congo in 2014. Opposed to the constitutional referendum of 2015, he was arrested for having organized an undeclared demonstration, and was sentenced to 2 years in prison in 2016 for "incitement to disturbance of public order". Suspected later of "complicity in escape", his imprisonment was extended by several months. Amnesty International denounced the imprisonment of Paulin Makaya, considering him as a "prisoner of conscience". He was finally released in September 2018, after 3 years of imprisonment.

== Youth and early years in politics ==
Paulin Makaya was born in Brazzaville in 1966. He graduated from the University of Brazzaville (political sociology) and from the University of Westminster (communication and management).

In 1991 Makaya became a close collaborator of the opposition figure Bernard Kolélas, president of the Congolese Movement for Democracy and Integral Development (MCDDI). He joined the MCDDI's executive office as national secretary in charge of culture, peace and national unity. He participated in pacifying the country during the unrest following the 1992 presidential election in which Bernard Kolélas, a candidate who reached the second round, lost to Pascal Lissouba.

== Exile ==
Makaya followed Bernard Kolélas into exile after the civil war of 1997. He first went to Kinshasa (Democratic Republic of the Congo), then to Gabon, Benin, Mali and Ivory Coast before settling in the United Kingdom in 2002. In London he managed several societies and tried to gather members of the Congolese diaspora (individuals, associations and companies) around his person for political purposes.

In 2007 Makaya distanced himself from Bernard Kolélas when the latter, returning to the Congo by presidential amnesty, approached President Denis Sassou Nguesso and his party, the Congolese Party of Labour (Parti congolais du travail, PCT). In 2011, he created his own political party, “United for the Congo” (Unis pour le Congo, UPC), made up of executives and intellectuals from the Congolese diaspora. A militant base developed inside the Congo, but the party leadership was dispersed between several countries including the United Kingdom, France, Benelux, West Africa and Canada.

== Return to the Congo and imprisonment ==
Makaya returned to Congo on 30 July 2014 after 17 years of exile with the aim of participating in the 2016 presidential election. He wanted to "stand up peacefully to the Brazzaville regime and take power by legal means", according to his spokesperson. In October 2015, opposed to the constitutional referendum initiated by the government (which would allow Denis Sassou-Nguesso to run for a third consecutive term), he organized an undeclared peaceful demonstration, which turned into a confrontation with the police. On 23 November 2015, he was charged with “inciting public disorder”, “complicity in arson” and “illegal possession of weapons and ammunition of war”, in connection with this demonstration.

In December, the International Federation for Human Rights (Fédération internationale des ligues des droits de l'homme, FIDH) denounced this arrest and expressed its “serious concerns” at the serial arrests of other referendum opponents. In February 2016, Amnesty International called for Paulin Makaya to be released and all charges to be dropped, since he was only exercising his right to freedom of expression. However, he remained imprisoned for 6 months without trial, before appearing on 30 May 2016 before an investigating judge, who referred him to the criminal court, but only retained the charge of "incitement to disturbance" of public order ”. On 25 July 2016, he was sentenced to 2 years in prison and a fine of 2.5 million CFA francs (approximately €3,000). His lawyer, Me Ibouanga, denounced the conviction as illegal and appealed it. On March 21, 2017, the Court of Appeal confirmed the original judgment of 2 years in prison.

Having served his sentence, Paulin Makaya was released from December 2017, but was kept in detention for 9 more months because he was indicted in January 2017 for "complicity in escape" following a shooting that took place in December 2016 at the Brazzaville remand center. Amnesty International denounced the unfounded accusations and called for his release, considering that “Paulin Makaya is a prisoner of conscience who is still charged by the Congolese authorities with political commitment and the exercise of the right to freedom of expression. On 13 September 2018 he was sentenced to one year in prison for these acts, but was finally released 4 days later, on 17 September 2018, his sentence having been considered to have been served after 3 years of imprisonment.

== Opposition ==
In January 2019, during Makaya's first public speech on the occasion of the greetings to the press, he called on the government to organize a national conference including the opposition, the party in power and the diaspora, in order to get the Congo out of the crisis, and demanded the release of other imprisoned opponents, such as Jean-Marie Mokoko and André Okombi Salissa. He also expressed his ambitions for the 2021 presidential election, considering either running or supporting a candidate unanimously chosen by the opposition. In October 2020, his UPC party was excluded from the official list of parties approved by the government because it was not represented throughout the country, a decision that Paulin Makaya contested.

== Sources ==
- "Amnesty International demande la libération de Paulin Makaya", rfi.fr (in French), 3 February 2016
- "Au Congo, l'opposant Paulin Makaya libéré", lemonde.fr (in French), 13 September 2018
- "Congo-Brazzaville: l'UPC de Paulin Makaya exclu de la liste des partis agréés", rfi.fr (in French), 29 October 2020
- "Congo-Brazzaville: peine de prison confirmée pour l'opposant Paulin Makaya", rfi.fr (in French), 21 March 2017
- "Congo : libération de l'opposant Paulin Makaya après trois ans de prison", jeuneafrique.com (in French), 18 September 2018
- Koubemba, Jean Jacques (26 January 2019), "Vie des partis : Paulin Makaya appelle à la tenue d'un dialogue inclusif", adiac-congo.com (in French)
- Lachkar, Michel (17 September 2018), "L'opposant politique Paulin Makaya attend toujours sa libération", francetvinfo.fr
- "Le prisonnier d'opinion Paulin Makaya doit être libéré", amnesty.org (in French), 13 September 2018
- "L'opposant Paulin Makaya condamné à deux ans de prison", rfi.fr (in French), 25 July 2016
- Massengo-Tiassé, Maurice (September 2016), "Sassou-Nguesso devant la Cour pénale internationale ?" (PDF), Afrique Education (in French) (444): 25
- Massengo-Tiassé, Maurice (September 2016b), "A RFI Me Massengo-Tiassé dénonce le durcissement du pouvoir illégitime de Sassou Nguesso et les massacres dans le Pool", AfriqueEducation (EXTRAIT DU RAPPORT présenté aux Nations Unies et à la CPI publié par AfriqueEducation N°444 de septembre 2016), no. 444, archived from the original on December 26, 2016
- Miangouayila, Jean-Claude (19 January 2016), "Qui est monsieur Paulin Makaya ?", opinion-internationale.com (in French), archived from the original on 17 July 2021
- "Paulin Makaya, la présidentielle de 2021 en ligne de mire", rfi.fr (in French), 27 January 2019
- "Paulin Makaya renvoyé devant le tribunal correctionnel", rfi.fr (in French), 30 May 2016
- "Vague de répression contre les opposants au projet de nouvelle constitution", fidh.org (in French), 15 December 2015
