= Clive Augusto =

Zimbabwean footballer (born 1994)

Personal information
- Full name: Clive Farai Augusto
- Date of birth: 26 July 1994 (age 32)
- Place of birth: Harare, Zimbabwe
- Height: 1.85 m (6 ft 1 in)
- Position: Centre-forward

Team information
- Current team: [Dinare Fc Botswana

Senior career*
Years	Team	Apps	(Gls)
2012	DT Africa United		
2013	Twalumba		
2014	Darwin United		
2015–2018	Ngezi Platinum		(6)
2019	Chicken Inn	17	(14)
2019–2020	Maritzburg United	11	(0)
2020	Uthongathi	9	(0)
2021–	CAPS United		

International career^{‡}
2018–	Zimbabwe	5	(0)
- * Club domestic league appearances and goals as of 5 October 2019 ‡ National team caps and goals as of 5 October 2019

Clive Farai Augusto (born 26 July 1994) is a Zimbabwean footballer who plays as a forward for CAPS United and the Zimbabwe national football team.

== Club career ==
Born in Harare suburb Tafara, he started his career at DT Africa United before spells at second level sides Twalumba and Darwin. In 2015 he moved to Ngezi Platinum with whom he clinched promotion to the Zimbabwe Premier Soccer League.

He then scored 14 goals in 17 matches for Chicken Inn, but left them after only 8 months in August 2019 for Maritzburg United after becoming unsettled at the club.

Augusto returned to Zimbabwe in August 2021, signing for CAPS United after an unsuccessful period in South Africa with Maritzburg United and then Uthongathi.2024Black Leopards FC South Africa 2025 Dinare FC Botswana
