= Mbah Koné =

Burkinabe footballer (born 1990)

Personal information
- Date of birth: 12 December 1990 (age 35)
- Place of birth: Bobo Dioulasso, Burkina Faso
- Position: Defender

Senior career*
Years	Team	Apps	(Gls)
2013–2017	RC Bobo Dioulasso		
2017–2018	Bobo Sport		

International career
2013–2014	Burkina Faso	4	(0)
- * Club domestic league appearances and goals

Mbah Koné (born 12 December 1990) is a Burkinabe former professional footballer who played as a defender for RC Bobo Dioulasso and Bobo Sport. He made four appearances for the Burkina Faso national team.

== International career ==
In January 2014, coach Brama Traore, invited him to be a part of the Burkina Faso squad for the 2014 African Nations Championship. The team was eliminated in the group stages after losing to Uganda and Zimbabwe and then drawing with Morocco.
