= Manaye Fantu =

Ethiopian footballer

Personal information
- Date of birth: 24 September 1990 (age 36)
- Place of birth: Ethiopia
- Position: Forward

Team information
- Current team: Defence F.C.

Manaye Fantu is an Ethiopian professional footballer, who plays as a forward for Defence F.C.

== International career ==
In January 2014, the coach Sewnet Bishaw invited him to be a part of the Ethiopia squad for the 2014 African Nations Championship. The team was eliminated in the group stages after losing to Congo, Libya and Ghana.
