= Adil Sassa =

Moroccan footballer

Personal information
- Date of birth: 1 December 1981 (age 44)
- Place of birth: Tétouan, Morocco
- Position: Defender

Team information
- Current team: DHJ

Adil Sassa is a Moroccan professional footballer who plays as a defender for DHJ.

== International career ==
In January 2014, coach Hassan Benabicha, invited him to be a part of the Moroccan squad for the 2014 African Nations Championship. He helped the team to top group B after drawing with Burkina Faso and Zimbabwe and defeating Uganda. The team was eliminated from the competition at the quarter-final zone after losing to Nigeria.
