= Augustine Mbara =

Zimbabwean footballer (born 1991)

Personal information
- Date of birth: 30 December 1991 (age 34)
- Place of birth: Bulawayo, Zimbabwe
- Position: Defender

Team information
- Current team: Dynamos F.C.

International career
Years	Team	Apps	(Gls)
- Zimbabwe

Augustine Mbara (born 30 December 1991) is a Zimbabwean professional footballer, who plays as a defender for Dynamos F.C.

== International career ==
In January 2014, coach Ian Gorowa, invited him to be a part of the Zimbabwe squad for the 2014 African Nations Championship. He helped the team to a fourth-place finish after being defeated by Nigeria by a goal to nil.
