= Issoufou Assoumane =

Nigerien politician

Issoufou Assoumane is a Nigerien politician who has been President of the Union of Nigerien Democrats and Socialists (Union des démocrates et socialistes nigériens, UDSN-Talaka) since 2001. He served in the government of Niger as Minister of Mines and Energy from 1995 to 1996 and as Minister of the Environment from 2000 to 2001.

== Political career ==
Assoumane was Secretary-General of the Democratic Union of Progressive Forces (UDFP-Sawaba) during the 1990s. Along with Mamadou Tandja, the President of the National Movement for the Development of Society (MNSD-Nassara), and André Salifou, the President of the Union of Democratic and Progressive Patriots (UPDP-Chamoua), Assoumane was arrested on 17 April 1994 following a protest against the government. In the January 1995 parliamentary election, the opposition coalition won a majority of seats, and Assoumane served in the government as Minister of Mines and Energy from 25 February 1995 until the government was ousted in a military coup on 27 January 1996.

After the 1996 coup, Assoumane was an opposition leader under President Ibrahim Bare Mainassara. When Mainassara dismissed the government in November 1997, expressing hope for greater political cooperation, Assoumane rejected the gesture. He said that nothing less than the dissolution of the National Assembly and the holding of a new election would be sufficient, and he said that the opposition would not participate in the next government. According to Assoumane, Mainassara's decision was "aimed at pulling wool over the international community's eyes" and intended to "portray the opposition as refusing to participate in his government". He noted that even if the opposition participated in the government, its ministers could be dismissed on a pretext at any time.

Assoumane was arrested in early January 1998, along with Hama Amadou and Mohamed Bazoum, for alleged involvement in a plot to assassinate Mainassara. He was never charged and was released a week after his arrest.

Later, following Bare's 1999 assassination, Assoumane supported the candidacy of Mamadou Tandja in the second round of the 1999 presidential election. Tandja won the election, and Assoumane was appointed to the government as Minister of the Environment and the Fight Against Desertification on 5 January 2000. He served in that position until 17 September 2001, when he left the government. He founded the UDSN-Talaka, a political party, in October 2001.

Although the UDSN-Talaka was part of the presidential majority coalition supporting President Tandja, Assoumane expressed opposition to Tandja's efforts to call a referendum on a new constitution that would allow him to run for re-election in 2009. Later, after the success of the referendum, he was present for an opposition rally in Niamey on 13 December 2009. On that occasion, he said that it was the will of the people that Tandja leave office on 22 December, the date his term was originally scheduled to end.

=== Since 2010 ===
Assoumane supported the candidacy of Mahamadou Issoufou in the January–March 2011 presidential election; he campaigned alongside Issoufou during the first round as well as the second. After Issoufou won the election and took office as President, he appointed Assoumane as Special Adviser to the President, with the rank of Minister, on 20 April 2011.
