= Moussa Sidi Bagayoko =

Mauritanian footballer

Personal information
- Full name: Moussa Sidi Bagayoko
- Date of birth: 31 December 1983 (age 42)
- Place of birth: Nouakchott, Mauritania
- Position: Midfielder

Team information
- Current team: Concorde

Senior career*
Years	Team	Apps	(Gls)
2006–	Concorde		

International career^{‡}
2006–	Mauritania	27	(0)
- * Club domestic league appearances and goals ‡ National team caps and goals as of 13 January 2018

Moussa Sidi Bagayoko (born 31 December 1983) is a Mauritanian footballer who plays as a midfielder for Concorde and the Mauritania national team.

== International career ==
Bagayoko made his debut for Mauritania on 3 September 2006 against Botswana.

== Career statistics ==
=== International ===
Statistics accurate as of match played 13 January 2018

Mauritania national team
Year	Apps	Goals
2006	2	0
2012	1	0
2013	1	0
2014	10	0
2015	6	0
2017	6	0
2018	1	0
Total	27	0

== Honours ==
- Ligue 1 Mauritania: winner (2016–17)
