= David Mbah =

- Citizenship: Nigeria
- Occupations: Academic; Engineer

David Mbah is a professor of Mechanical engineering at the University of Lagos. He is a fellow of the Nigerian Academy of Science who was elected into the Academy’s Fellowship at its Annual General Meeting held in January, 2015. In 2010, he won the Ludwig Mond Award for outstanding contributions to the field of Engineering.
