= Drissa Sangaré =

Malian footballer

Personal information
- Full name: Idrissa Sangaré
- Date of birth: 18 April 1987 (age 39)
- Place of birth: Mopti, Mali
- Position: Defender

Team information
- Current team: CO de Bamako

Senior career*
Years	Team	Apps	(Gls)
2010–	CO de Bamako		

International career^{‡}
2013	Mali A'	1	(0)
- * Club domestic league appearances and goals as of 13:07, 17 September 2018 (UTC) ‡ National team caps and goals as of 13:07, 17 September 2018 (UTC)

Idrissa Sangaré (born 18 April 1987) is a Malian footballer who plays as a defender for CO de Bamako in the Malian Première Division.

== Club career ==
Born in Mopti, a city in central Mali on the Niger and Bani rivers, Sangaré joined CO de Bamako ahead of the 2010–11 season. The Bamako-based club, founded in 1960, competes in the Malian Première Division and plays its home matches at the Stade du 26 Mars. Sangaré has remained with the club for over a decade, making him one of its longest-serving players.

== International career ==
Sangaré earned his sole cap for the Mali A' national team, the squad composed of players active in the domestic league, on 27 August 2013. He appeared in a friendly match against Libya at the Terrain El Mouradi in Hammam Bourguiba, Tunisia, which Libya won 1–0. The match was played between the two countries' locally based squads in preparation for the 2014 African Nations Championship in South Africa, for which both Mali and Libya had qualified.
