= Siboniso Conco =

South African soccer player

Personal information
- Date of birth: 2 March 1996 (age 30)
- Place of birth: Empangeni, South Africa
- Height: 1.60 m (5 ft 3 in)
- Position: Midfielder

Team information
- Current team: Richards Bay F.C.
- Number: 17

Senior career*
Years	Team	Apps	(Gls)
2017–2022	Golden Arrows	58	(5)
2022–2023	Maritzburg United	13	(0)
2024-	Richards Bay F.C.	8	(0)

International career^{‡}
2019	South Africa	1	(0)
- * Club domestic league appearances and goals as of 8/6/25 @ 14:59(AEST) ‡ National team caps and goals as of 10 November 2022

Siboniso Conco (born 2 March 1996) is a South African professional soccer player who plays for Maritzburg United. He made his international debut for South Africa in 2019.
