= Aliassou Sanou =

Burkinabe footballer (born 1988)

Personal information
- Date of birth: 24 May 1988 (age 38)
- Place of birth: Ouagadougou, Burkina Faso
- Height: 1.90 m (6 ft 3 in)
- Position: Midfielder

Senior career*
Years	Team	Apps	(Gls)
2013–2016	AS SONABEL		
2016	Sunshine Stars		
2017	Rivers United	19	(0)
2018	Lobi Stars	5	(0)
2018–2020	Salitas FC	13	(0)
2020–2021	USFA	2	(0)

International career
2014–2015	Burkina Faso	3	(0)
- * Club domestic league appearances and goals

Aliassou Sanou (born 24 May 1988) is a Burkinabe former professional footballer who played as a midfielder.

== International career ==
In January 2014, coach Brama Traore, invited him to be a part of the Burkina Faso squad for the 2014 African Nations Championship. The team was eliminated in the group stages after losing to Uganda and Zimbabwe and then drawing with Morocco.
