= Julius Ntambi =

Ugandan footballer (born 1992)

Personal information
- Date of birth: 3 June 1992 (age 34)
- Place of birth: Uganda
- Position: Midfielder

Team information
- Current team: Kiira Young

Julius Ntambi is a Ugandan professional footballer who plays as a midfielder for Kiira Young.

== International career ==
In January 2014, coach Milutin Sedrojevic, invited him to be included in the Uganda national football team for the 2014 African Nations Championship. The team placed third in the group stage of the competition after beating Burkina Faso, drawing with Zimbabwe and losing to Morocco.
