= Khayelihle Shozi =

South African soccer player

Personal information
- Full name: Khyelihle Shozi
- Date of birth: 28 December 1994 (age 31)
- Place of birth: South Africa
- Height: 1.69 m (5 ft 6 1/2 in)
- Position: Midfielder

Team information
- Current team: TS Galaxy
- Number: 13

Youth career
- Chloorkop
- Mamelodi Sundowns

Senior career*
Years	Team	Apps	(Gls)
2015–2019	Mamelodi Sundowns	0	(0)
2016	→ SuperSport United (loan)	0	(0)
2016–2017	→ Black Leopards (loan)	25	(2)
2017	→ Richards Bay (loan)	16	(0)
2019–	TS Galaxy	17	(4)
- * Club domestic league appearances and goals as of 23:31, 5 February 2020 (UTC)

Khayelihle Shozi is a South African footballer who plays as a midfielder or attacking midfielder for TS Galaxy.

== Career ==
Shozi has graduated through the academy at Sundowns and began training with the first team under the direction of Pitso Mosimane and his technical team during the 2015/16 season.

The player was brought to Sundowns by Mabhuti Khenyeza, in 2010. Khenyeza was playing for the Chloorkop outfit at the time. The experienced Golden Arrows striker had Shozi playing for his own club, Rockers FC, before taking him to Sundowns. The attacking midfielder is a talented player that has an eye for goal. He has been part of the SA U23 team under Owen da Gama.
