= Martin Mpuga =

Ugandan footballer (born 1992)

Personal information
- Date of birth: 20 November 1992 (age 33)
- Place of birth: Kampala, Uganda
- Position: Defender

Team information
- Current team: Maroons FC

Senior career*
Years	Team	Apps	(Gls)
2010–2011	Luwero United		
2011–2012	Maroons FC		
2012–2015	SC Victoria University		
2015–2016	Kampala CCA		
2017–2018	Police FC		
2018–	Maroons FC	19	(0)

International career^{‡}
2013–2014	Uganda	3	(1)
- * Club domestic league appearances and goals as of 13 July 2020 ‡ National team caps and goals as of 13 June 2021

Martin Mpuga (born 20 November 1992) is a Ugandan footballer, who played as a defender for Maroons FC.

== International career ==
In January 2014, coach Milutin Sedrojevic, invited him to be included in the Uganda national football team for the 2014 African Nations Championship. The team placed third in the group stage of the competition after beating Burkina Faso, drawing with Zimbabwe and losing to Morocco.
