= Chris Fagih Tchibota =

Congolese footballer

Chris Tchibota
Personal information
- Full name: Chris Fagih Tchibota
- Date of birth: 22 April 1995 (age 31)
- Place of birth: Congo
- Position: Defender

Team information
- Current team: CS La Mancha

Chris Fagih Tchibota is a Congolese professional footballer who plays as a defender for CS La Mancha.

== International career ==
In January 2014, coach Claude Leroy, invited him to be a part of the Congo squad for the 2014 African Nations Championship. The team was eliminated in the group stages after losing to Ghana, drawing with Libya and defeating Ethiopia.
