= El Dios de barro =

Mexican telenovela

- Genre: Telenovela
- Country of origin: Mexico
- Original language: Spanish

Original release
- Network: Telesistema Mexicano
- Release: 1970

El Dios de barro (English title:The God of Clay) is a Mexican telenovela produced by Televisa and transmitted by Telesistema Mexicano in 1970.

== Cast ==
- Rosario Granados
- Raúl Ramírez
- Adriana Roel
- Héctor Andremar
- Carlos Ancira
