= Francis Morton =

Ghanaian footballer

Personal information
- Full name: Francis Morton
- Date of birth: 5 November 1992 (age 33)
- Place of birth: Ghana
- Height: 1.88 m (6 ft 2 in)
- Position: Left-back

Team information
- Current team: Ebusua Dwarfs
- Number: 23

Youth career
- –2012: Liberty Professionals

Senior career*
Years	Team	Apps	(Gls)
2012	Liberty Professionals	0	(0)
2012–	Ebusua Dwarfs	36	(5)

International career
2013–	Ghana	11	(2)
Medal record
Football
Representing Ghana
Winner	WAFU Nations Cup	2013
Runner-up	African Nations Championship	2014
- * Club domestic league appearances and goals

Francis Morton (born 5 November 1992) is a Ghanaian professional footballer who currently plays as a left-back for Ebusua Dwarfs in the Ghana Football Leagues.

== Club career ==
Francis Morton began his youth career with Ghana Premier League club Liberty Professionals, prior to joining Ebusua Dwarfs on 1 July 2012 for the beginning of the 2012–2013 Ghanaian Premier League season and Morton debuted in the Ebusua Dwarfs for the 2012–2013 Ghanaian Premier League season on 7 October 2012 in a 1–1 draw against Berekum Arsenal for the Robert Mensah Sports Stadium.

== International career ==
In November 2013, coach Maxwell Konadu invited Morton to be included in the Ghana 30-man team for the 2013 WAFU Nations Cup. Morton helped Ghana defeat Senegal, 3–1. Morton was included in the Ghana national football team for the 2014 African Nations Championship that finished runner-up.

== Honours ==
=== National team ===
Ghana

- WAFU Nations Cup Winner: 2013
- African Nations Championship Runner-up: 2014
