= Lassana Samaké =

Malian footballer

Lassana Samaké (born 8 December 1992) is a Malian footballer who plays for Onze Créateurs de Niaréla and Mali National team as Left Back or Left Midfielder.

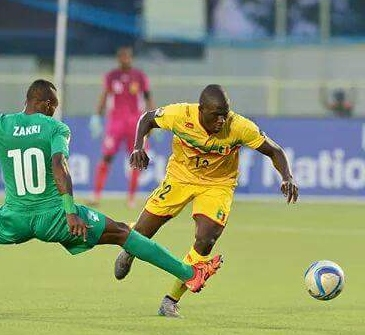
Lassana Samaké, against Côte d'Ivoire, CHAN 2016 Semi Finals, 2 February 2016

== Club career ==
Samaké plays for Onze Créateurs de Niaréla, since 2010, in Malian Division 1.

He won the Mali Cup in 2014.

== International career ==
Lassana Samaké counts 8 selections in Mali national team. He played all the games of 2016 African Nations Championship, reached the final and made 3 assists. He was the revelation of this 2016 African Nations Championship.

National Team	Selections	Goals	Assists
Mali	8	0	4
