= Tariku Getnet =

Ethiopian footballer (born 1994)

Personal information
- Date of birth: 3 December 1994 (age 31)
- Place of birth: Debre Zeyit, Ethiopia
- Position: Goalkeeper

Team information
- Current team: Dedebit F.C.

Tariku Getnet (born 3 December 1994) is an Ethiopian professional footballer who plays as a goalkeeper for Hadiya Hossana FC.

== International career ==
In January 2014, coach Sewnet Bishaw invited him to be a part of the Ethiopia squad for the 2014 African Nations Championship. The team was eliminated in the group stages after losing to Congo, Libya and Ghana.
