= Kwanda Mngonyama =

South African soccer player

Personal information
- Full name: Kwandakwensizwa Ishmael Mngonyama
- Date of birth: 25 September 1993 (age 33)
- Place of birth: Durban, South Africa
- Height: 1.90 m (6 ft 3 in)
- Position: Centre back

Team information
- Current team: AmaZulu
- Number: 45

Senior career*
Years	Team	Apps	(Gls)
2012–2017	Mamelodi Sundowns	0	(0)
2013–2014	→ Bidvest Wits (loan)	22	(0)
2014–2017	→ Maritzburg United (loan)	72	(4)
2018–2019	Cape Town City	21	(0)
2019–2021	Maritzburg United	25	(2)
2021–2022	Orlando Pirates	6	(0)
2022–2024	Moroka Swallows	36	(0)
2024–	AmaZulu	24	(4)

International career^{‡}
2016	South Africa Olympic	1	(0)
	South Africa U23	12	(2)
	South Africa	14	(3)
- * Club domestic league appearances and goals as of 28 January 2025 ‡ National team caps and goals as of 11 July 2021

Kwandakwensizwa Ishmael Mngonyama (born 25 September 1993) is a South African professional soccer player who plays as a defender for AmaZulu.

In 2021 he switched from Maritzburg United to the Orlando Pirates.

He has the ability to play across the back four although most often plays as a centre-back at club level and right-back at international level.

He made his international debut for South Africa in May 2015, and also played in the 2015 COSAFA Cup, bringing his cap tally to 6. He was then a squad member for the 2016 Olympic Games.

== Honours ==
Bidvest Wits F.C.

Runners-up

- Nedbank Cup: 2013–14

Champions

- MTN 8: 2018

Cape Town City
