= Ikechukwu Gabriel =

Nigerian footballer

Personal information
- Place of birth: Warri, Nigeria
- Position: Defender

Team information
- Current team: Bayelsa United

Ikechukwu Gabriel is a Nigerian professional footballer who plays as a defender for Bayelsa United.

== International career ==
In January 2014, coach Stephen Keshi, invited him to be included in the Nigeria 23-man team for the 2014 African Nations Championship. He helped the team defeat Zimbabwe to a third-place finish by a goal to nil.
