= Lindokuhle Mbatha =

South African soccer player

Personal information
- Full name: Lindokuhle John Mbatha
- Date of birth: 25 June 1985 (age 41)
- Place of birth: Osizweni, South Africa
- Height: 1.65 m (5 ft 5 in)
- Position: Right winger

Team information
- Current team: TS Galaxy
- Number: 35

Senior career*
Years	Team	Apps	(Gls)
2006–2007	SA City Pillars	9	(0)
2007–2011	Mpumalanga Black Aces	65	(8)
2011–2014	Platinum Stars	59	(2)
2014–2015	Mamelodi Sundowns	7	(0)
2015–2016	Mpumalanga Black Aces	9	(0)
2016–2020	Highlands Park	90	(12)
2020–	TS Galaxy	74	(6)

International career^{‡}
2014	South Africa	3	(0)
- * Club domestic league appearances and goals as of 1 August 2023 ‡ National team caps and goals as of 11 October 2021

Lindokuhle John Mbatha (born 25 June 1985) is a South African international footballer who plays for TS Galaxy, as a right winger.

== Career ==
Mbatha has played club football for SA City Pillars, Mpumalanga Black Aces, Platinum Stars, Mamelodi Sundowns and TS Galaxy.

He made his international debut for South Africa in 2014.
