= Yaya Samaké =

Malian footballer

Personal information
- Date of birth: 3 May 1999 (age 27)
- Place of birth: Mali
- Position: Midfielder

Team information
- Current team: AS Nianan

Yaya Samaké is a Malian professional footballer, who plays as a midfielder for AS Nianan.

== International career ==
In January 2014, coach Djibril Dramé, invited him to be a part of the Mali squad for the 2014 African Nations Championship. He helped the team to the quarter-finals where they lost to Zimbabwe by two goals to one.
