= Henrino Makaya =

Congolese footballer

Personal information
- Full name: Henrino Prince Beranger Makaya
- Date of birth: 17 February 1993 (age 33)
- Place of birth: Congo
- Position: Midfielder

Senior career*
Years	Team	Apps	(Gls)
2013	Diables Noirs		
2014–2016	AS Cheminots		

International career
2013	Congo	1	(0)
- * Club domestic league appearances and goals

Henrino Makaya is a Congolese professional footballer who last played as a midfielder for AS Cheminots.

== International career ==
In January 2014, coach Claude Leroy, invited him to be a part of the Congo squad for the 2014 African Nations Championship. The team was eliminated in the group stages after losing to Ghana, drawing with Libya and defeating Ethiopia.
