= Ivan Ntege =

Ugandan footballer (born 1994)

Personal information
- Full name: Ivan Ntege
- Date of birth: 8 September 1994 (age 32)
- Place of birth: Uganda
- Position: Defensive midfielder

Team information
- Current team: Kampala Capital City Authority
- Number: 4

Senior career*
Years	Team	Apps	(Gls)
2012–2014	Kampala Capital City Authority		
2014–17	KF Tirana	0	(0)
2014	→ KF Elbasani(loan)	0	(0)
2018–	Kampala Capital City Authority		

International career
2013–	Uganda	8	(0)
- * Club domestic league appearances and goals

Ivan Ntege (born 8 September 1994) is a Ugandan professional footballer who plays for KF Tirana in Albania and the Ugandan national team.

== International career ==
In January 2014, coach Milutin Sredojević, invited him to be included in the Uganda national football team for the 2014 African Nations Championship. The team placed third in the group stage of the competition after beating Burkina Faso, drawing with Zimbabwe and losing to Morocco.
