= Themba Ndlovu =

Zimbabwean footballer (born 1984)

Personal information
- Date of birth: 10 January 1984 (age 42)
- Place of birth: Bulawayo, Zimbabwe
- Position: Defender

Team information
- Current team: Dynamos F.C.

Themba Ndlovu is a Zimbabwean professional footballer, who plays as a defender for Dynamos F.C.

== International career ==
In January 2014, coach Ian Gorowa, invited him to be a part of the Zimbabwe squad for the 2014 African Nations Championship. He helped the team to a fourth-place finish after being defeated by Nigeria by a goal to nil.
