= Ronnie Kiseka =

Ugandan footballer (born 1991)

Ronnie Kisekka
Personal information
- Date of birth: 5 December 1991 (age 34)
- Place of birth: Uganda
- Position: Defender

Senior career*
Years	Team	Apps	(Gls)
2009–2010	Nalubaale		
2010–2012	Proline FC		
2012–2015	Kampala Capital City Authority FC		
2015–2016	Bright Stars FC		
2016–2017	Proline FC		
2017–2018	Express FC		
2018–2019	Mbarara City FC		

International career
2014	Uganda	1	(0)
- * Club domestic league appearances and goals

Ronnie Kisekka (born 5 December 1991) is a Ugandan footballer, who plays as a defender.

== International career ==
In January 2014, coach Milutin Sedrojevic, invited him to be included in the Uganda national football team for the 2014 African Nations Championship. The team placed third in the group stage of the competition after beating Burkina Faso, drawing with Zimbabwe and losing to Morocco.
