= Barro Negro (volcano) =

Volcanic cone in the northern Puna of Argentina

Barro Negro is a scoria cone in the northern Puna of Argentina. About 50 kilometres (31 mi) way from Abra Pampa, it is 50 metres (160 ft) high and is no older than the underlying 6.6 mya Las Termas ignimbrite from Coranzulí caldera. It has generated two lava flows, one 4.2 kilometres (2.6 mi) long extending southsoutheastward. The other northeastward is heavily eroded and only isolated lava plateaus are left.

The lavas erupted from the cone are porphyric trachyandesite-basalt of shoshonitic composition. They contain pyroxene and olivine phenocrysts with subordinate microphenocrysts of plagioclase and phlogopite and inclusions of gray minerals. The magmas generating this volcanism are primitive and may be oceanic crust-derived melts with some crustal contamination.
