= Issouf Sanou =

Burkinabé footballer

Personal information
- Full name: Yssouf Sanou
- Date of birth: January 18, 1979 (age 47)
- Place of birth: Ouagadougou, Upper Volta
- Height: 1.82 m (5 ft 11 1/2 in)
- Position: Striker

Team information
- Current team: Etoile Filante
- Number: 18

Youth career
- 1999–2001: ASFA Yennega

Senior career*
Years	Team	Apps	(Gls)
2001–2004	ASFA Yennega	45	(17)
2004–2006	Raja Casablanca	46	(4)
2006–	Etoile Filante		

International career
2004–2006	Burkina Faso	2	(0)
- * Club domestic league appearances and goals as of 16:33, 20 May 2008 (UTC)

Issouf Sanou (born January 18, 1979, in Ouagadougou) is a footballer from Burkina Faso, who plays for Etoile Filante Ouagadougou.

== Career ==
Sanou began his career with ASFA Yennega and joined 2004 to Raja Casablanca. After just two years in Morocco turned back to Burkina Faso and signed with Etoile Filante Ouagadougou in summer 2006.
