= Simon Okwi =

Ugandan footballer (born 1994)

Personal information
- Date of birth: 24 August 1994 (age 32)
- Place of birth: Luzira, Uganda
- Height: 1.70 m (5 ft 7 in)
- Position: Forward

Team information
- Current team: Bukedea Town Council

Senior career*
| Years | Team | Apps | (Gls) |
| 2011-2012 | Kiyovu Sport | | |
| 2012-2013 | Kampala CCA | | |
| 2013-2015 | Victoria University SC | | (7) |
| 2015-2016 | BUL Jinja | | |
| 2015-2016 | Soana Wakiso | | |
| 2016 | Sofapaka Nairobi | 10 | (2) |
| 2016-2017 | Jimma Aba Bunna | | |
| 2017-2018 | URA Kampala | | |
| 2017-2018 | Soana Wakiso | | |
| 2018-2019 | Tooro United F.C. | 7 | (0) |
| 2019- | Bukedea Town Council | | |

International career
| 2013-2014 | Uganda | 4 | (0) |
- * Club domestic league appearances and goals

Simon Okwi is a Ugandan professional footballer who plays as a forward for Bukedea Town Council.

== International career ==
In January 2014, coach Milutin Sedrojevic, invited him to be included in the Uganda national football team for the 2014 African Nations Championship. The team placed third in the group stage of the competition after beating Burkina Faso, drawing with Zimbabwe and losing to Morocco.
