= Sewnet Bishaw =

Ethiopian football manager (born 1952)

Personal information
- Full name: Sewnet Bishaw
- Date of birth: 1 January 1952 (age 74)
- Place of birth: Bure, West Gojjam Zone

Managerial career
- Years: Team
- 2004–2006: Ethiopia
- 2011–2014: Ethiopia

Sewnet Bishaw (Amharic: ሰውነት ቢሻው; born 1 January 1952) is an Ethiopian football manager.

He achieved regional success with the Ethiopia national football team in 2005 when he won the CECAFA Cup during his first spell as manager.

In October 2011, Sewnet was re-appointed to the position after the resignation of Belgian coach, Tom Saintfiet. A year later, he helped Ethiopia qualify for their tenth Africa Cup of Nations tournament since 1982. He was sacked in August 2014, following poor results in the 2014 World Cup qualifiers final game as Ethiopia lost to Nigeria.
