= Lofty Naseem =

Egyptian professional football manager

Lotfy Naseem
Personal information
- Full name: Lotfy Naseem Mohamed
- Place of birth: Egypt

Managerial career
- Years: Team
- 2012–2014: Burundi

Lofty Naseem Mohamed is an Egyptian professional football manager.

== Career ==
Since April 2012 until April 2014 he took charge of the Burundi national football team after the resignation of Adel Amrouche.
