= Brama Traoré =

Burkinabé football manager (born 1962)

Personal information
- Date of birth: 22 March 1962 (age 64)
- Place of birth: Bobo-Dioulasso, Burkina Faso
- Position: Midfielder

Youth career
- JC de Bobo Dioulasso

Senior career*
Years	Team	Apps	(Gls)
1980–1982	JC de Bobo Dioulasso		
1982–1993	RC Bobo Dioulasso		

International career
1986–1993	Burkina Faso	29	(2)

Managerial career
- 1995–2000: RC Bobo Dioulasso
- 199?–2020: Burkina Faso U20
- 1999–2024: Burkina Faso U23
- 2005–2008: RC Bobo Dioulasso
- 2012–2015: Burkina Faso A'
- 2019–2022: RC Bobo Dioulasso
- 2024–2026: Burkina Faso
- * Club domestic league appearances and goals

Brama "Chercheur" Traoré (born 22 March 1962) is a Burkinabé football manager and former player. He most recently served as the manager of the Burkina Faso national team.

== Club career ==
Nicknamed "Chercheur", Brama Traoré played domestically within Burkina Faso.

He began at JC de Bobo Dioulasso, and played for the senior team between 1980 and 1982. He spent the rest of his career with RC Bobo Dioulasso between 1982 and 1993.

He won the 1984 and 1987 editions of the Coupe du Faso and the 1992–93 Leader's Cup while playing for RC Bobo Dioulasso.

== International career ==
He represented Burkina Faso between 1986 and 1993. He earned twenty-nine caps and scored two goals Burkina Faso.

== Managerial career ==
He has managed RC Bobo Dioulasso over three spells between 1995 and 2022, and he won the 2007 Coupe du Faso with the club.

He then managed the Burkina Faso U20, U23 and A' teams between 1999 and 2024, where his team finished runners-up at the 2023 Jeux de la Francophonie.

Traoré was the assistant manager of the Burkina Faso national team during the 2015 Africa Cup of Nations, and he became the Burkina Faso manager on 11 March 2023. His first game in charge was a 2–1 friendly loss against Libya on 22 March 2024. On 14 January 2026, he was relieved of his duties after his team was eliminated in the round of 16 at the 2025 Africa Cup of Nations.

== Honours ==
=== As a player ===
RC Bobo Dioulasso

- Burkinabé Premier League: third place 1984–85, 1987–88
- Coupe du Faso: 1984, 1987; runner-up 1985
- Leader's Cup: 1992–93

=== As a manager ===
RC Bobo Dioulasso

- Coupe du Faso: 2007; runner-up 2006

Burkina Faso U23

- Alexandria International Tournament: runner-up 2002, 2003
- UFOA-B Tournament: third place 2008, 2022
- CEN-SAD Niamey Games: 2008
- UNAF International Junior Tournament: 2009
- Rézé International Junior Cup: 2010
- International Espoir Tournament: 2010
- Ibiza International Junior Tournament: 2010
- Burkina Faso 50th Anniversary Tournament: 2010
- Jeux de la Francophonie: 2023
