= South Sudan national football team results =

This page details the match results and statistics of the South Sudan national football team.

== Key ==
Key to matches

- Att.=Match attendance
- (H)=Home ground
- (A)=Away ground
- (N)=Neutral ground

Key to record by opponent

- Pld=Games played
- W=Games won
- D=Games drawn
- L=Games lost
- GF=Goals for
- GA=Goals against

Color key
| Win |
| Draw |
| Defeat |

== Results ==
South Sudan's score is shown first in each case.

| No. | Date | Venue | Opponents | Score | Competition | South Sudan scorers | Att. | Ref. |
|---|---|---|---|---|---|---|---|---|
| 1 | 10 July 2012 | Juba Stadium, Juba (H) | Uganda | 2–2 | Friendly | Lado, Moga | 22,000 | |
| 2 | 24 November 2012 | Namboole Stadium, Kampala (N) | Ethiopia | 0–1 | 2012 CECAFA Cup | | — | |
| 3 | 27 November 2012 | Namboole Stadium, Kampala (N) | Kenya | 0–2 | 2012 CECAFA Cup | | — | |
| 4 | 30 November 2012 | Namboole Stadium, Kampala (N) | Uganda | 0–4 | 2012 CECAFA Cup | | — | |
| 5 | 27 November 2013 | Nyayo National Stadium, Nairobi (N) | Zanzibar | 1–2 | 2013 CECAFA Cup | Lako | — | |
| 6 | 30 November 2013 | Nyayo National Stadium, Nairobi (N) | Kenya | 1–3 | 2013 CECAFA Cup | Lado | — | |
| 7 | 3 December 2013 | Kenyatta Stadium, Machakos (N) | Ethiopia | 0–2 | 2013 CECAFA Cup | | — | |
| 8 | 5 March 2014 | Botswana National Stadium, Gaborone (A) | Botswana | 0–3 | Friendly | | — | |
| 9 | 18 May 2014 | Estádio do Zimpeto, Maputo (A) | Mozambique | 0–5 | 2015 Africa Cup of Nations qualification | | — | |
| 10 | 30 May 2014 | Khartoum Stadium, Khartoum (H) | Mozambique | 0–0 | 2015 Africa Cup of Nations qualification | | — | |
| 11 | 7 June 2015 | Amahoro Stadium, Kigali (N) | Kenya | 0–2 | Friendly | | — | |
| 12 | 13 June 2015 | Stade du 26 Mars, Bamako (A) | Mali | 0–2 | 2017 Africa Cup of Nations qualification | | — | |
| 13 | 5 September 2015 | Juba Stadium, Juba (H) | Equatorial Guinea | 1–0 | 2017 Africa Cup of Nations qualification | Bentiu | — | |
| 14 | 7 October 2015 | Juba Stadium, Juba (H) | Mauritania | 1–1 | 2018 FIFA World Cup qualification | Abui Pretino | 10,000 | |
| 15 | 13 October 2015 | Stade Olympique, Nouakchott (A) | Mauritania | 0–4 | 2018 FIFA World Cup qualification | | 9,000 | |
| 16 | 23 November 2015 | Bahir Dar Stadium, Bahir Dar (N) | Djibouti | 2–0 | 2015 CECAFA Cup | Bruno, Abui Pretino | — | |
| 17 | 25 November 2015 | Bahir Dar Stadium, Bahir Dar (N) | Sudan | 0–0 | 2015 CECAFA Cup | | — | |
| 18 | 27 November 2015 | Bahir Dar Stadium, Bahir Dar (N) | Malawi | 2–0 | 2015 CECAFA Cup | Moga, Bruno | — | |
| 19 | 1 December 2015 | Addis Ababa Stadium, Addis Ababa (N) | Sudan | 0–0 (3–5p) | 2015 CECAFA Cup | | — | |
| 20 | 23 March 2016 | Juba Stadium, Juba (H) | Benin | 1–2 | 2017 Africa Cup of Nations qualification | Bruno | — | |
| 21 | 27 March 2016 | Stade de l'Amitié, Cotonou (A) | Benin | 1–4 | 2017 Africa Cup of Nations qualification | Lual | — | |
| 22 | 4 June 2016 | Juba Stadium, Juba (H) | Mali | 0–3 | 2017 Africa Cup of Nations qualification | | — | |
| 23 | 4 September 2016 | Estadio de Malabo, Malabo (A) | Equatorial Guinea | 0–4 | 2017 Africa Cup of Nations qualification | | — | |
| 24 | 22 March 2017 | El Hadj Hassan Gouled Aptidon Stadium, Djibouti (A) | Djibouti | 0–2 | 2019 Africa Cup of Nations qualification | | — | |
| 25 | 28 March 2017 | Juba Stadium, Juba (H) | Djibouti | 6–0 | 2019 Africa Cup of Nations qualification | Wurube, Moga (2), Pretino, Athir, Khamis | — | |
| 26 | 10 June 2017 | Prince Louis Rwagasore Stadium, Bujumbura (A) | Burundi | 0–3 | 2019 Africa Cup of Nations qualification | | — | |
| 27 | 5 December 2017 | Bukhungu Stadium, Kakamega (N) | Ethiopia | 0–3 | 2017 CECAFA Cup | | — | |
| 28 | 8 December 2017 | Bukhungu Stadium, Kakamega (N) | Uganda | 1–5 | 2017 CECAFA Cup | Lual | — | |
| 29 | 11 December 2017 | Bukhungu Stadium, Kakamega (N) | Burundi | 0–0 | 2017 CECAFA Cup | | — | |
| 30 | 9 September 2018 | Juba Stadium, Juba (H) | Mali | 0–3 | 2019 Africa Cup of Nations qualification | | — | |
| 31 | 12 October 2018 | Stade d'Angondjé, Libreville (A) | Gabon | 0–3 | 2019 Africa Cup of Nations qualification | | — | |
| 32 | 16 October 2018 | Juba Stadium, Juba (H) | Gabon | 0–1 | 2019 Africa Cup of Nations qualification | | — | |
| 33 | 16 November 2018 | Juba Stadium, Juba (H) | Burundi | 2–5 | 2019 Africa Cup of Nations qualification | Lual, Aboi | — | |
| 34 | 23 March 2019 | Stade du 26 Mars, Bamako (A) | Mali | 0–3 | 2019 Africa Cup of Nations qualification | | — | |
| 35 | 4 September 2019 | Al-Hilal Stadium, Omdurman (H) | Equatorial Guinea | 1–1 | 2022 FIFA World Cup qualification | Kata (o.g.) | 2,000 | |
| 36 | 8 September 2019 | Estadio de Malabo, Malabo (A) | Equatorial Guinea | 0–1 | 2022 FIFA World Cup qualification | | 6,700 | |
| 37 | 9 October 2019 | Al-Merrikh Stadium, Omdurman (H) | Seychelles | 2–1 | 2021 Africa Cup of Nations qualification | Thok, Kuch | — | |
| 38 | 13 October 2019 | Stade Linité, Victoria (A) | Seychelles | 1–0 | 2021 Africa Cup of Nations qualification | Kuch | — | |
| 39 | 13 November 2019 | Kamuzu Stadium, Blantyre (A) | Malawi | 0–1 | 2021 Africa Cup of Nations qualification | | — | |
| 40 | 17 November 2019 | Khartoum Stadium, Khartoum (H) | Burkina Faso | 1–2 | 2021 Africa Cup of Nations qualification | Pawar | — | |
| 41 | 12 November 2020 | St. Mary's Stadium-Kitende, Entebbe (A) | Uganda | 0–1 | 2021 Africa Cup of Nations qualification | | — | |
| 42 | 16 November 2020 | Nyayo National Stadium, Nairobi (H) | Uganda | 1–0 | 2021 Africa Cup of Nations qualification | Okello | — | |
| 43 | 13 March 2021 | Nyayo National Stadium, Nairobi (A) | Kenya | 0–1 | Friendly | | — | |
| 44 | 24 March 2021 | Al-Hilal Stadium, Omdurman (H) | Malawi | 0–1 | 2021 Africa Cup of Nations qualification | | — | |
| 45 | 29 March 2021 | Stade du 4 Août, Ouagadougou (A) | Burkina Faso | 0–1 | 2021 Africa Cup of Nations qualification | | — | |
| 46 | 21 June 2021 | Khalifa International Stadium, Doha (N) | Jordan | 0–3 w/o | 2021 FIFA Arab Cup qualification | | — | |
| 47 | 6 October 2021 | Stade El Abdi, El Jadida (N) | Sierra Leone | 1–1 | Friendly | Emmanuel | — | |
| 48 | 12 October 2021 | Stade El Abdi, El Jadida (N) | Gambia | 1–2 | Friendly | Lual | — | |
| 49 | 27 January 2022 | The Sevens Stadium, Dubai (N) | Uzbekistan | 0–3 | Friendly | | — | |
| 50 | 31 January 2022 | The Sevens Stadium, Dubai (N) | Jordan | 1–2 | Friendly | Yuel | — | |
| 51 | 23 March 2022 | Borg El Arab Stadium, Borg El Arab (A) | Djibouti | 4–2 | 2023 Africa Cup of Nations qualification | Okello (2), Toha, Gama | — | |
| 52 | 27 March 2022 | St. Mary's Stadium-Kitende, Entebbe (H) | Djibouti | 1–0 | 2023 Africa Cup of Nations qualification | Chol | — | |
| 53 | 4 June 2022 | Stade Lat-Dior, Thiès (A) | Gambia | 0–1 | 2023 Africa Cup of Nations qualification | | — | |
| 54 | 9 June 2022 | St. Mary's Stadium-Kitende, Entebbe (H) | Mali | 1–3 | 2023 Africa Cup of Nations qualification | Kouyaté (o.g.) | — | |
| 55 | 23 March 2023 | Stade Alphonse Massemba-Débat, Brazzaville (A) | Congo | 2–1 | 2023 Africa Cup of Nations qualification | Daniel, Okello | — | |
| 56 | 27 March 2023 | National Stadium, Dar es Salaam (H) | Congo | 0–1 | 2023 Africa Cup of Nations qualification | | — | |
| 57 | 14 June 2023 | Suez Canal Stadium, Ismailia (H) | Gambia | 2–3 | 2023 Africa Cup of Nations qualification | Yuel, P. Chol | — | |
| 58 | 18 June 2023 | Cairo International Stadium, Cairo (A) | Egypt | 0–3 | Friendly | | — | |
| 59 | 8 September 2023 | Stade du 26 Mars, Bamako (A) | Mali | 0–4 | 2023 Africa Cup of Nations qualification | | — | |
| 60 | 12 September 2023 | Moi International Sports Centre, Nairobi (A) | Kenya | 1–0 | Friendly | Okello | — | |
| 61 | 18 November 2023 | Diamniadio Olympic Stadium, Diamniadio (A) | Senegal | 0–4 | 2026 FIFA World Cup qualification | | — | |
| 62 | 21 November 2023 | Diamniadio Olympic Stadium, Diamniadio (H) | Mauritania | 0–0 | 2026 FIFA World Cup qualification | | — | |
| 63 | 22 March 2024 | Berkane Municipal Stadium, Berkane | São Tomé and Príncipe | 1–1 | 2025 Africa Cup of Nations qualification | J. Dhata | — | |
| 64 | 26 March 2024 | Berkane Municipal Stadium, Berkane | São Tomé and Príncipe | 0–0 | 2025 Africa Cup of Nations qualification | | — | |
| 65 | 5 June 2024 | Stade de Kegué, Lomé (A) | Togo | 1—1 | 2026 World Cup qualification | Aholou (o.g.) | – | |
| 66 | 11 June 2024 | (H) | Sudan | – | 2026 FIFA World Cup qualification | | | |
| | 16 March 2025 | (A) | DR Congo | – | 2026 FIFA World Cup qualification | | | |
| | 23 March 2025 | (A) | Sudan | – | 2026 FIFA World Cup qualification | | | |
| | 31 August 2025 | (H) | DR Congo | – | 2026 FIFA World Cup qualification | | | |
| | 7 September 2025 | (A) | Mauritania | – | 2026 FIFA World Cup qualification | | | |
| | 5 October 2025 | (H) | Senegal | – | 2026 FIFA World Cup qualification | | | |
| | 12 October 2025 | (H) | Togo | – | 2026 FIFA World Cup qualification | | | |

Notes

1. A: South Sudan played their home match in qualifying for the 2015 Africa Cup of Nations in Khartoum, Sudan due to security concerns stemming from the South Sudanese Civil War.
2. B: South Sudan's home match against Mauritania during qualifying for the 2018 FIFA World Cup was suspended after 10 minutes due to torrential rain, with the score at 1–1. The match was resumed the following morning.
3. C: South Sudan played their home match during qualifying for the 2022 FIFA World Cup in Omdurman, Sudan while their usual home stadium – Juba Stadium, Juba – was being renovated.
4. D: South Sudan played their home matches during qualifying for the 2021 Africa Cup of Nations in Omdurman and Khartoum, Sudan and Nairobi, Kenya while their usual home stadium – Juba Stadium, Juba – was being renovated.
5. E: Jordan were awarded a technical 3–0 win against South Sudan in qualifying for the 2021 FIFA Arab Cup after South Sudan were forced to forfeit their due to the high number of COVID-19 cases among the South Sudan delegation.
6. F: Djibouti played their home match against South Sudan during qualifying for the 2023 Africa Cup of Nations in Borg El Arab, Egypt.
7. G: South Sudan played their home matches during qualifying for the 2023 Africa Cup of Nations in Entebbe, Uganda; Dar es Salam, Tanzania and Ismaila, Egypt.
8. H: South Sudan are playing their home matches during qualifying for the 2026 FIFA World Cup in Diamniadio, Senegal.

== Record by opponent ==
| Team | Pld | W | D | L | GF | GA | GD | WPCT |
|---|---|---|---|---|---|---|---|---|
| Benin | 2 | 0 | 0 | 2 | 2 | 6 | −4 | 0.00 |
| Botswana | 1 | 0 | 0 | 1 | 0 | 3 | −3 | 0.00 |
| Burkina Faso | 2 | 0 | 0 | 2 | 1 | 3 | −2 | 0.00 |
| Burundi | 3 | 0 | 1 | 2 | 2 | 8 | −6 | 0.00 |
| Congo | 4 | 2 | 0 | 2 | 5 | 5 | 0 | 50.00 |
| Djibouti | 7 | 5 | 0 | 2 | 17 | 5 | +12 | 71.43 |
| DR Congo | 2 | 0 | 0 | 2 | 1 | 5 | −4 | 0.00 |
| Egypt | 2 | 0 | 0 | 2 | 0 | 8 | −8 | 0.00 |
| Equatorial Guinea | 4 | 1 | 1 | 2 | 2 | 6 | −4 | 25.00 |
| Ethiopia | 3 | 0 | 0 | 3 | 0 | 6 | −6 | 0.00 |
| Gabon | 2 | 0 | 0 | 2 | 0 | 4 | −4 | 0.00 |
| Gambia | 3 | 0 | 0 | 3 | 3 | 6 | −3 | 0.00 |
| Jordan | 2 | 0 | 0 | 2 | 1 | 5 | −4 | 0.00 |
| Kenya | 5 | 1 | 0 | 4 | 2 | 8 | −6 | 20.00 |
| Mali | 6 | 0 | 0 | 6 | 1 | 18 | −17 | 0.00 |
| Malawi | 4 | 1 | 0 | 3 | 3 | 4 | −1 | 25.00 |
| Mauritania | 4 | 0 | 3 | 1 | 1 | 5 | −4 | 0.00 |
| Mozambique | 2 | 0 | 1 | 1 | 0 | 5 | −5 | 0.00 |
| Senegal | 2 | 0 | 0 | 2 | 0 | 9 | −9 | 0.00 |
| Seychelles | 2 | 2 | 0 | 0 | 3 | 1 | +2 | 100.00 |
| Sierra Leone | 1 | 0 | 1 | 0 | 1 | 1 | 0 | 0.00 |
| South Africa | 2 | 0 | 0 | 2 | 2 | 6 | −4 | 0.00 |
| Sudan | 3 | 0 | 3 | 0 | 1 | 1 | 0 | 0.00 |
| Syria | 1 | 0 | 0 | 1 | 0 | 2 | −2 | 0.00 |
| Togo | 1 | 0 | 1 | 0 | 0 | 0 | 0 | 0.00 |
| Uganda | 8 | 1 | 1 | 6 | 6 | 20 | −14 | 12.50 |
| Uzbekistan | 1 | 0 | 0 | 1 | 0 | 3 | −3 | 0.00 |
| Zanzibar | 1 | 0 | 0 | 1 | 1 | 2 | −1 | 0.00 |
| Total | 80 | 13 | 12 | 55 | 55 | 155 | −100 | 16.25 |

Source: Results
