= Sport in South Sudan =

Sports in South Sudan are still not widely recognized internationally.

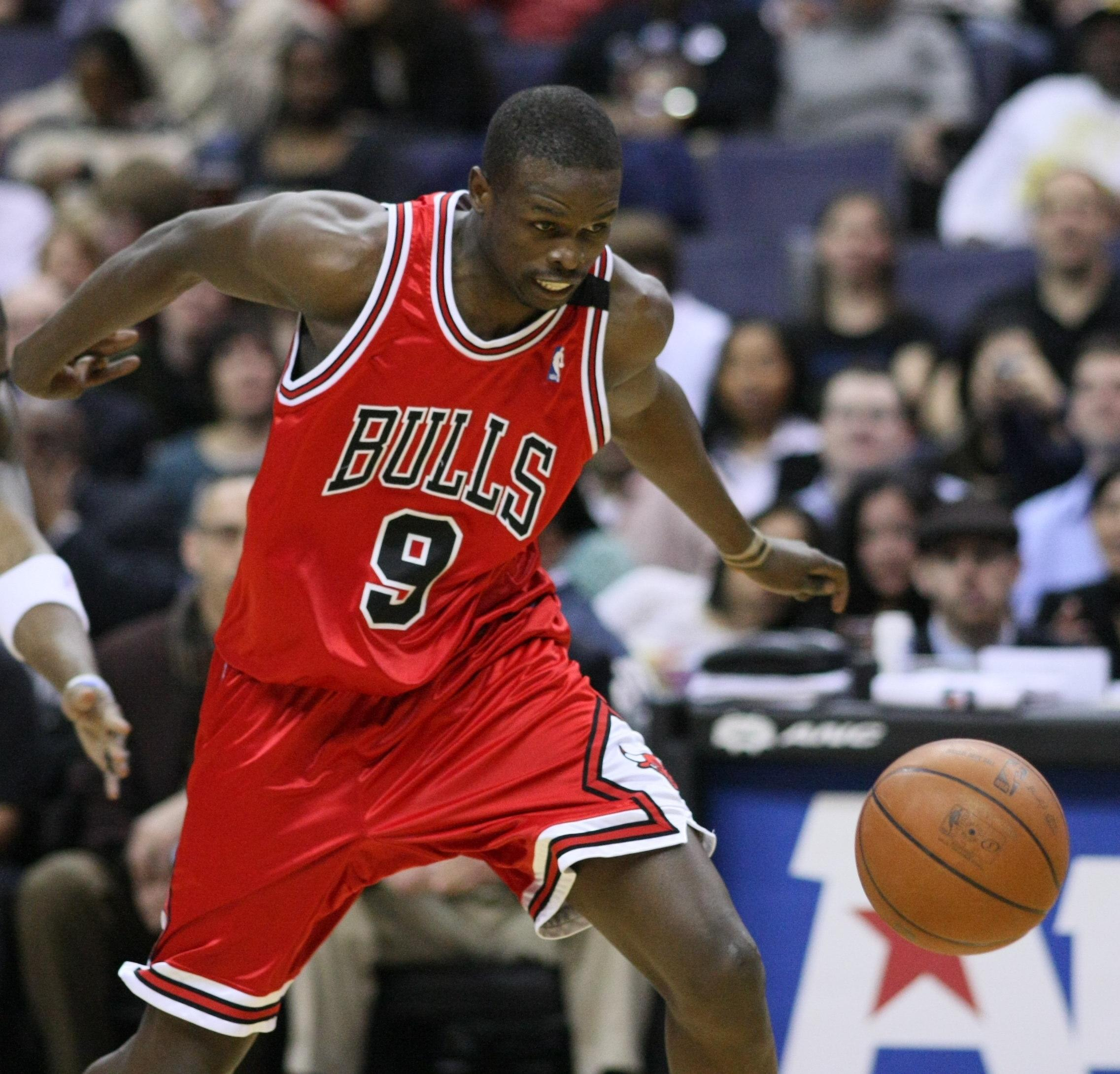
South Sudan-born basketball player Luol Deng.

Many traditional and modern games and sports are popular in South Sudan, particularly wrestling and mock battles. The traditional sports were mainly played after the harvest seasons to celebrate the harvests and finish the farming seasons. During the matches, they smeared themselves with ochre – perhaps to enhance the grip or heighten their perception. The matches attracted large numbers of spectators who sang, played drums and danced in support of their favourite wrestlers. Though these were perceived as competition, they were primarily for entertainment.

== Basketball ==
Luol Deng was a two-time All-Star in the National Basketball Association. At the international level, he represented Great Britain. Other leading international basketball players from South Sudan include Thon Maker, Nuni Omot, Deng Adel and Deng Gai. Manute Bol, who died in 2010, was also from what is now South Sudan.

The South Sudan national basketball team played its first match against the Uganda national basketball team on 10 July 2011 in Juba. At the 2024 Paris Olympics included former NBA players Wenyen Gabriel and Marial Shayok.

== Football ==
Association football is also becoming popular in South Sudan, and there are many initiatives by the Government of South Sudan and other partners to promote the sport and improve the level of play. One of these initiatives is South Sudan Youth Sports Association (SSYSA). SSYSA is already holding football clinics in Konyokonyo and Muniki areas of Juba in which young boys are coached. In recognition of these efforts with youth football, the country recently hosted the CECAFA youth football competitions. Barely a month earlier, it had also hosted the larger East African Schools Sports tournaments.

The South Sudan national association football team joined the Confederation of African Football in February 2012 and became a full FIFA member in May 2012. The team played its first match against Tusker FC of the Kenyan Premier League on 10 July 2011 in Juba as part of independence celebrations, scoring early but losing 1–3 to the more experienced team. Famous South Sudanese footballers are James Moga, Richard Justin, Athir Thomas, Goma Genaro Awad, Khamis Leyano, Khamis Martin and Roy Gulwak.

== International recognition ==
The following governing bodies internationally recognized:

Organisation	Status
South Sudan Football Association	On 25 May 2012, South Sudan became the 209th member of FIFA.
South Sudan Basketball Federation	In December 2013, South Sudan became the 54th African member of FIBA.
South Sudan Athletics Federation	On 19 November 2014 provisional IAAF membership was granted to the South Sudan Athletics Federation with full rights and obligations.

== Olympic Games ==
=== 2012 Olympics ===
Guor Marial competed in the men's marathon at the 2012 Summer Olympics. Because South Sudan does not yet have a recognized national Olympic committee (NOC), Marial competed under the Olympic Flag at the 2012 Olympics, rather than the South Sudanese flag. He is one of four athletes competed in the 2012 Summer Olympics under the Olympic flag rather than that of an individual country.
