= Joseph Malish Manese =

South Sudanese footballer

Joseph Malish Manese (born 27 July 2002) is a South Sudanese footballer who plays as a midfielder for Kator FC and the South Sudan national team.

He played for South Sudan in the Afcon qualifier, including the return game with Mali, replacing Mokoi who only lasted for 36 minutes.

He was formerly playing for Kator FC of Juba South Sudan, and left for trials in Italy. Following his return, he joined Al-Merrik football club of Omdurman Sudan, in which he is currently playing.
