= 2023 Africa Cup of Nations qualification Group G =

Association football tournament group

Group G of the 2023 Africa Cup of Nations qualification tournament was one of the twelve groups that decided the teams which qualified for the 2023 Africa Cup of Nations finals tournament. The group consisted of four teams: Mali, Congo, Gambia and South Sudan (the latter two both winners of the preliminary round).

The teams played against each other in a home-and-away round-robin format, between 4 June 2022 and 10 September 2023.

Mali and Gambia, the group winners and runners-up respectively, qualified for the 2023 Africa Cup of Nations.

== Standings ==
Pos	Team	Pld	W	D	L	GF	GA	GD	Pts	Qualification	Mali	Gambia	Republic of the Congo	South Sudan
1	Mali	6	5	0	1	15	2	+13	15	Final tournament	—	2–0	4–0	4–0
2	Gambia	6	3	1	2	7	7	0	10	Final tournament	1–0	—	2–2	1–0
3	Congo	6	2	1	3	5	10	−5	7		0–2	1–0	—	1–2
4	South Sudan	6	1	0	5	5	13	−8	3		1–3	2–3	0–1	—

Source: CAF
Rules for classification: Tiebreakers

== Matches ==
4 June 2022
16:00 UTC+0

Gambia	1–0	South Sudan
A. Jallow 45+4'	Report

Stade Lat-Dior, Thiès (Senegal)
Referee: Jean Ouattara (Burkina Faso)
4 June 2022
19:00 UTC+0

Mali	4–0	Congo
Camara 1'; E. Touré 11', 40'; Coulibaly 44'	Report

Stade du 26 Mars, Bamako
Referee: Abdel Aziz Mohamed Bouh (Mauritania)

8 June 2022
17:00 UTC+1

Congo	1–0	Gambia
Makoumbou 74'	Report

Stade Alphonse Massemba-Débat, Brazzaville
Referee: André Kolissala (Central African Republic)
9 June 2022
16:00 UTC+3

South Sudan	1–3	Mali
Kouyaté 29' (o.g.)	Report	Camara 59'; Koïta 90+3'; Dieng 90+5'

St. Mary's Stadium-Kitende, Entebbe (Uganda)
Referee: Mashood Ssali (Uganda)

23 March 2023
17:00 UTC+1

Congo	1–2	South Sudan
Bifouma 90' (pen.)	Report	Daniel 66'; Okello 90+6'

Stade Alphonse Massemba-Débat, Brazzaville
Referee: Celso Armindo Alvação (Mozambique)
24 March 2023
19:00 UTC+0

Mali	2–0	Gambia
K. Doumbia 3'; A. Traoré 90+5'	Report

Stade du 26 Mars, Bamako
Referee: Jean Ouattara (Burkina Faso)

27 March 2023
16:00 UTC+3

South Sudan	0–1	Congo
	Report	Charpentier 90'

National Stadium, Dar es Salaam (Tanzania)
Referee: Joseph Odey Ogabor (Nigeria)
28 March 2023
16:00 UTC+0

Gambia	1–0	Mali
O. Colley 79'	Report

Stade Mohammed V, Casablanca (Morocco)
Referee: Kouassi Attisso Attiogbe (Togo)

14 June 2023
15:00 UTC+2

South Sudan	2–3	Gambia
Yuel 21'; P. Chol 90+1'	Report	Angier 4' (o.g.); A. Jallow 62'; Barry 90+6'

Suez Canal Stadium, Ismailia (Egypt)
Referee: Dahane Beida (Mauritania)
18 June 2023
17:00 UTC+1

Congo	0–2	Mali
	Report	Koné 62'; Nene 73'

Stade Alphonse Massemba-Débat, Brazzaville
Referee: Samir Guezzaz (Morocco)

8 September 2023
19:00 UTC+0

Mali	4–0	South Sudan
Koné 10'; K. Doumbia 29', 57'; Nene 82'	Report

Stade du 26 Mars, Bamako
Referee: Mehrez Melki (Tunisia)
10 September 2023
20:00 UTC+1

Gambia	2–2	Congo
Minteh 79'; Badamosi 90'	Report	Makouta 30'; Ganvoula 45+1' (pen.)

Stade de Marrakech, Marrakesh (Morocco)
Referee: Mohamed Maarouf Eid Mansour (Egypt)

== Goalscorers ==
There were 32 goals scored in 12 matches, for an average of 2.67 goals per match.

3 goals

- (Mali) Kamory Doumbia

2 goals

- (The Gambia) Ablie Jallow
- (Mali) Mohamed Camara
- (Mali) Dorgeles Nene
- (Mali) Ibrahima Koné
- (Mali) El Bilal Touré

1 goal

- (Republic of the Congo) Thievy Bifouma
- (Republic of the Congo) Gabriel Charpentier
- (Republic of the Congo) Silvère Ganvoula
- (Republic of the Congo) Antoine Makoumbou
- (Republic of the Congo) Gaius Makouta
- (The Gambia) Muhammed Badamosi
- (The Gambia) Hamza Barry
- (The Gambia) Omar Colley
- (The Gambia) Yankuba Minteh
- (Mali) Kalifa Coulibaly
- (Mali) Aliou Dieng
- (Mali) Sékou Koïta
- (Mali) Adama Malouda Traoré
- (South Sudan) Peter Chol
- (South Sudan) Chol Daniel
- (South Sudan) Tito Okello
- (South Sudan) Valentino Yuel

1 own goal

- (Mali) Boubakar Kouyaté (against South Sudan)
- (South Sudan) Rehan Angier (against Gambia)
