= Moussa Djenepo =

Malian footballer (born 1998)

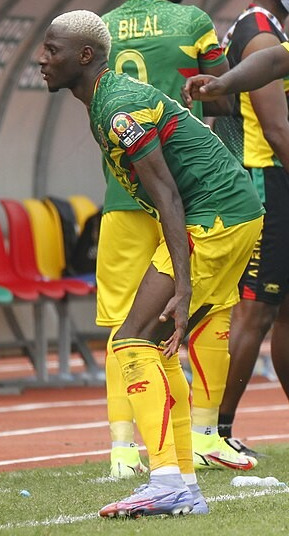

Personal information
- Full name: Moussa Djenepo
- Date of birth: 15 June 1998 (age 28)
- Place of birth: Mopti, Mali
- Height: 1.77 m (5 ft 10 in)
- Positions: Winger; left-back

Team information
- Current team: Panetolikos
- Number: 12

Youth career
- 2016–2017: Yeelen Olympique
- 2017: → Standard Liège (loan)

Senior career*
| Years | Team | Apps | (Gls) |
| 2017–2019 | Standard Liège | 49 | (9) |
| 2019–2023 | Southampton | 73 | (3) |
| 2023–2025 | Standard Liège | 26 | (1) |
| 2024–2025 | → Antalyaspor (loan) | 23 | (2) |
| 2025–2026 | Esteghlal | 9 | (0) |
| 2026– | Panetolikos | 9 | (0) |

International career^{‡}
| 2017 | Mali U20 | 3 | (0) |
| 2017– | Mali | 36 | (3) |
- * Club domestic league appearances and goals as of 17:20, 13 November 2026 (UTC) ‡ National team caps and goals as of 11 October 2024

Moussa Djenepo (born 15 June 1998) is a Malian professional footballer who plays as a winger or left-back for Greek Super League club Panetolikos and the Mali national team.

Djenepo began his professional career at Standard Liège. In June 2019, he moved to Southampton. Djenepo scored on his debut for the club, which was voted as Premier League Goal of the Month for September 2019. After four years with Southampton, he rejoined Standard Liège in September 2023. He had a loan spell with Antalyaspor during the 2024–25 season. Djenepo has since joined Esteghal in 2025 and Panetolikos in 2026. He made his senior international debut in 2017.

== Club career ==
=== Early career ===
Djenepo began his career at Yeelen Olympique in Mali.

=== Standard Liège ===
On 31 January 2017, Djenepo joined Standard Liège on loan, with an option to buy. The club activated his buyout clause on 30 May 2017, hence making the transfer move permanent. He made his professional debut with Standard Liège in a 4–0 loss in the Belgian First Division A to Club Brugge on 27 August 2017. Djenepo netted his first goal on 11 March 2018, in a 3–2 away victory against Oostende at Versluys Arena.

On 17 March 2018, Djenepo played when he came on as a substitute for Mehdi Carcela, as Standard Liège beat Genk 1–0 after extra time to win the 2018 Belgian Cup final and qualify for the UEFA Europa League.

=== Southampton ===
On 13 June 2019, Djenepo signed a four-year contract with Premier League club Southampton for a reported fee of £14 million. He scored his first goal for the Saints on 24 August 2019, in a 2–0 win over Brighton & Hove Albion. Djenepo scored his second goal for the club in a 1–0 victory against Sheffield United, which was voted as goal of the month in September 2019. On 7 March 2020, Djenepo was given a red card against Newcastle after Graham Scott checked the pitchside monitor. Djenepo would not make another appearance that season.

On 12 September 2020, Djenepo made his first appearance of the season in a 1–0 defeat to Crystal Palace, replacing Will Smallbone in the 77th minute. Djenepo scored his first goal of the 2020–21 season on 4 October 2020 in a 2–0 win over West Bromwich Albion. On 4 January 2021, Djenepo sustained a muscle injury and was forced to come off in the first half during a 1–0 victory against Liverpool. On 20 March 2021, Djenepo would score his second goal of the season in a 0–3 victory against Bournemouth in the FA Cup.

Djenepo made his first appearance of the 2021–22 season on 14 August 2021 in a 3–1 defeat to Everton. Djenepo only made 16 appearances during the campaign and scored no goals for the club.

On 6 August 2022, Djenepo made his first appearance of the season in a 4–1 defeat to Tottenham Hotspur. On 14 September 2022, Southampton announced Djenepo had signed a new three-year contract until 2025. On 11 January 2023, Djenepo scored in a 2–0 victory against Manchester City in the EFL Cup.

=== Return to Standard Liège ===
On 5 September 2023, Djenepo rejoined Standard Liège on a three-year contract for an undisclosed fee, reported to be around £3 million.

On 12 July 2024, Djenepo joined Antalyaspor on a season-long loan with an option to buy.

=== Esteghlal ===
On 22 August 2025, Djenepo signed a three-year contract with Esteghlal.

=== Panetolikos ===
On 7 August 2026, Djenepo joined Panetolikos on a two-year contract.

== International career ==
Djenepo is a youth international for the Mali under-20 team, appearing in the 2017 Africa U-20 Cup of Nations.

Djenepo received his first call-up to the senior team on 3 October 2017. He made his debut on 6 October, in a goalless 2018 FIFA World Cup qualification match with Ivory Coast. On 23 March 2019, Djenepo scored against South Sudan in a 2019 Africa Cup of Nations qualification home fixture, which ended in a 3–0 victory.

== Career statistics ==
=== Club ===
As of match played 1 November 2026

Appearances and goals by club, season and competition
| Club | Season | League | | | National cup (Note: Includes Belgian Cup, FA Cup) | | League cup (Note: Includes EFL Cup) | | Europe | | Other | | Total | |
| Club | Season | Division | Apps | Goals | Apps | Goals | Apps | Goals | Apps | Goals | Apps | Goals | Apps | Goals |
|---|---|---|---|---|---|---|---|---|---|---|---|---|---|---|
| Standard Liège | 2017–18 | Belgian Pro League | 17 | 1 | 5 | 0 | — | | — | | — | | 22 | 1 |
| Standard Liège | 2018–19 | Belgian Pro League | 32 | 8 | 0 | 0 | — | | 6 (Note: One appearance in UEFA Champions League, five appearances and three goals in UEFA Europa League) | 3 | 1 (Note: Appearance in Belgian Super Cup) | 0 | 39 | 11 |
| Standard Liège | Total | | 49 | 9 | 5 | 0 | — | | 6 | 3 | 1 | 0 | 61 | 12 |
| Southampton | 2019–20 | Premier League | 18 | 2 | 1 | 0 | 1 | 0 | — | | — | | 20 | 2 |
| Southampton | 2020–21 | Premier League | 27 | 1 | 3 | 1 | 1 | 0 | — | | — | | 31 | 2 |
| Southampton | 2021–22 | Premier League | 12 | 0 | 2 | 0 | 2 | 0 | — | | — | | 16 | 0 |
| Southampton | 2022–23 | Premier League | 16 | 0 | 2 | 0 | 5 | 1 | — | | — | | 23 | 1 |
| Southampton | 2023–24 | Championship | 0 | 0 | 0 | 0 | 1 | 0 | — | | — | | 1 | 0 |
| Southampton | Total | | 73 | 3 | 8 | 0 | 10 | 1 | — | | — | | 91 | 5 |
| Standard Liège | 2023–24 | Belgian Pro League | 25 | 1 | 2 | 0 | — | | — | | — | | 27 | 1 |
| Antalyaspor (loan) | 2024–25 | Süper Lig | 23 | 2 | 4 | 0 | — | | — | | — | | 27 | 2 |
| Esteghlal | 2025–26 | Persian Gulf League | 9 | 0 | 0 | 0 | — | | — | | 4 | 0 | 13 | 0 |
| Panetolikos | 2026–27 | Greek Super League | 9 | 0 | 0 | 0 | — | | — | | — | | 9 | 0 |
| Career total | | | 188 | 15 | 19 | 1 | 10 | 1 | 6 | 3 | 5 | 0 | 228 | 20 |

=== International ===
As of match played 11 October 2024

Appearances and goals by national team and year
| National team | Year | Apps | Goals |
|---|---|---|---|
| Mali | 2017 | 2 | 0 |
| Mali | 2018 | 5 | 0 |
| Mali | 2019 | 8 | 2 |
| Mali | 2020 | 1 | 0 |
| Mali | 2021 | 6 | 1 |
| Mali | 2022 | 9 | 0 |
| Mali | 2023 | 2 | 0 |
| Mali | 2024 | 3 | 0 |
| Total | | 36 | 3 |

As of match played 11 November 2021. Mali score listed first, score column indicates score after each Djenepo goal.

List of international goals scored by Moussa Djenepo
| No. | Date | Venue | Cap | Opponent | Score | Result | Competition |
|---|---|---|---|---|---|---|---|
| 1 | 23 March 2019 | Stade du 26 Mars, Bamako, Mali | 8 | South Sudan | 2–0 | 3–0 | 2019 Africa Cup of Nations qualification |
| 2 | 17 November 2019 | Stade Omnisports, N'Djamena, Chad | 15 | Chad | 1–0 | 2–0 | 2021 Africa Cup of Nations qualification |
| 3 | 11 November 2021 | Nyamirambo Regional Stadium, Kigali, Rwanda | 22 | Rwanda | 1–0 | 3–0 | 2022 FIFA World Cup qualification |

== Honours ==
Standard Liège

- Belgian Cup: 2017–18
- Belgian Super Cup runner-up: 2018

Individual

- Premier League Goal of the Month: September 2019
