= Kalifa Coulibaly =

Malian footballer (born 1991)

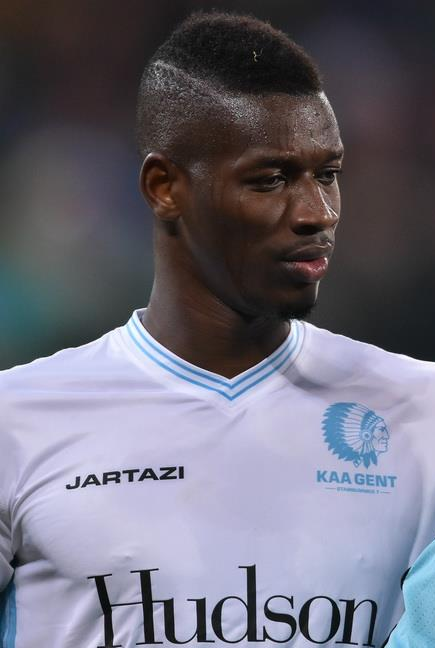
- Coulibaly with Gent in 2016

Personal information
- Date of birth: 21 August 1991 (age 35)
- Place of birth: Bamako, Mali
- Height: 1.97 m (6 ft 6 in)
- Position: Forward

Senior career*
Years	Team	Apps	(Gls)
2009–2011	Real Bamako		
2011–2014	Paris Saint-Germain B	86	(30)
2014–2015	Charleroi	29	(7)
2015–2017	Gent	60	(12)
2017–2022	Nantes	99	(21)
2022–2023	Red Star Belgrade	4	(1)
2023–2024	Quevilly-Rouen	30	(12)
2024–2025	Caen	18	(2)

International career^{‡}
2013–	Mali	31	(6)
- * Club domestic league appearances and goals as of 13 May 2025 ‡ National team caps and goals as of 23:44, 16 November 2022 (UTC)

Kalifa Coulibaly (born 21 August 1991) is a Malian professional footballer who plays as a forward for the Mali national team.

== Club career ==
Born in Bamako, Coulibaly played club football for Real Bamako, Paris Saint-Germain B and Sporting Charleroi before signing a four-year deal with Gent in June 2015.

On 18 August 2017, FC Nantes announced the signing of Coulibaly on a five-year deal.

On 29 August 2022, Coulibaly signed with Red Star Belgrade in Serbia until the end of the season, with an option to extend.

== International career ==
Coulibaly made his international debut for the Mali national team in 2013. He was a member of the squad at the 2017 Africa Cup of Nations.

== Career statistics ==
=== Club ===
As of match played 22 February 2025

Appearances and goals by club, season and competition
Club	Season	League			National cup		League cup		Europe		Other		Total	
Club	Season	Division	Apps	Goals	Apps	Goals	Apps	Goals	Apps	Goals	Apps	Goals	Apps	Goals
Paris Saint-Germain	2011–12	Ligue 1	0	0	0	0	0	0	0	0	0	0	0	0
Charleroi	2014–15	Belgian Pro League	30	7	2	0	—		—		—		32	7
Gent	2015–16	Belgian Pro League	24	4	3	0	—		6 (Note: Appearances in UEFA Champions League)	2	0	0	33	6
Gent	2016–17	Belgian Pro League	33	9	0	0	—		10 (Note: Appearances in UEFA Europa League)	4	0	0	43	13
Gent	2017–18	Belgian Pro League	3	0	0	0	—		2	0	0	0	5	0
Gent	Total		60	13	3	0	—		18	6	0	0	81	19
Nantes	2017–18	Ligue 1	8	1	—		—		—		—		8	1
Nantes	2018–19	Ligue 1	32	8	5	3	2	1	—		—		39	12
Nantes	2019–20	Ligue 1	21	4	1	1	1	0	—		—		23	5
Nantes	2020–21	Ligue 1	17	3	0	0	—		—		2 (Note: Appearances in Ligue 1 relegation/promotion play-offs)	0	19	3
Nantes	2021–22	Ligue 1	21	5	0	0	—		—		—		21	5
Nantes	Total		99	21	6	4	3	1	—		2	0	110	26
Red Star Belgrade	2022–23	Serbian SuperLiga	4	1	1	0	—		1	0	—		6	0
Quevilly-Rouen	2023–24	Ligue 2	30	12	2	0	—		—		—		32	12
Caen	2024–25	Ligue 2	11	0	1	0	—		—		—		12	0
Career total			217	51	15	4	3	1	19	6	2	0	256	61

=== International ===
As of match played 16 November 2022

Appearances and goals by national team and year
National team	Year	Apps	Goals
Mali	2013	1	0
Mali	2014	3	0
Mali	2015	0	0
Mali	2016	2	0
Mali	2017	5	1
Mali	2018	1	0
Mali	2019	7	1
Mali	2020	2	0
Mali	2021	4	3
Mali	2022	5	1
Total		31	6

Scores and results list Mali's goal tally first, score column indicates score after each Coulibaly goal.

List of international goals scored by Kalifa Coulibaly
No.	Date	Venue	Opponent	Score	Result	Competition
1	10 June 2017	Stade du 26 Mars, Bamako, Mali	Gabon	1–1	2–1	2019 Africa Cup of Nations qualification
2	23 March 2019	Stade du 26 Mars, Bamako, Mali	South Sudan	1–0	3–0	2019 Africa Cup of Nations qualification
3	11 June 2021	Stade El Menzah, Tunis, Tunisia	DR Congo	1–0	1–1	Friendly
4	11 November 2021	Nyamirambo Regional Stadium, Kigali, Rwanda	Rwanda	3–0	3–0	2022 FIFA World Cup qualification
5	14 November 2021	Stade Adrar, Agadir, Morocco	Uganda	1–0	1–0	2022 FIFA World Cup qualification
6	4 June 2022	Stade du 26 Mars, Bamako, Mali	Congo	4–0	4–0	2023 Africa Cup of Nations qualification

== Honours ==
Real Bamako

- Malian Cup: 2010

Nantes

- Coupe de France: 2021–22
