= Ibrahim Buwembo Mukalazi =

Ugandan footballer

Personal information
- Full name: Ibrahim Buwembo Mukalazi
- Date of birth: 24 May 1967
- Place of birth: Uganda
- Date of death: 29 December 2023 (aged 56)
- Place of death: Mengo Hospital, Kampala, Uganda
- Position: Winger

Senior career*
Years	Team	Apps	(Gls)
1981–1985	State House FC		
1986–1987	Express FC		
1988–1992	Coffee FC		
1993–1995	Al-Buraimi FC		
1995–1997	Clubs in Vietnam		
1998–2000	Simba FC		
2001–2003	Express FC		
2005–2006	Super Cubs FC		

International career
1992–2001	Uganda		

Managerial career
- 1997: Express FC
- 2003: Express FC (assistant coach)
- 2007: Express FC
- * Club domestic league appearances and goals

Ibrahim Buwembo Mukalazi also known as Ibrahim Buwembo (24 May 1967 – 29 December 2023) was a Ugandan football player, coach and players' agent.

== Playing career ==
Buwembo began his senior football career with State House FC, where he played from 1981 to 1985, before joining Express FC in 1986, remaining with the club until 1987. In 1988, he transferred to Coffee FC, where he played until 1992. From there, Buwembo moved abroad to join Al-Buraimi FC in Oman, where he played from 1993 to 1995.

In 1995, Buwembo moved to Vietnam, where he played until 1997. He returned to Uganda in 1998 and joined Simba FC, remaining with the club until 2000, before rejoining Express FC in 2001, where he played until 2003. In 2005, he joined Super Cubs FC, where he remained until 2006.

At international level, Buwembo represented Uganda from 1992 to 2001. He made his debut on 9 October 1992 in a friendly match against Ethiopia and was part of the Uganda team that won the 1992 CECAFA Senior Challenge Cup in Tanzania.

== Coaching career ==
After retiring as a player, Buwembo began his coaching career. He served as head coach of Express FC in 1997 and again in 2007, and was assistant coach to Leo Adraa at Express FC in 2003 before becoming a football agent and analyst.

== Achievements ==
Buwembo won

- the 1992 CECAFA Senior Challenge Cup with Uganda Cranes
- the Uganda Cup with Express FC in 2001

== Death ==
Ibrahim Buwembo Mukalazi died on 29 December 2023 at Mengo Hospital in Kampala after an illness and was buried on 30 December 2023.

== See also ==
- Moses Basena
- Fred Kajoba
