= Ivan Wani =

South Sudanese footballer (born 1998)

Personal information
- Full name: Ivan Wani Adebo Levi
- Date of birth: 12 December 1998 (age 27)
- Place of birth: Kalangala, Uganda
- Position: Midfielder

Team information
- Current team: Jamus

Youth career
- Jinja SS

Senior career*
Years	Team	Apps	(Gls)
2017–2019	Maroons		
2019–2021	Busoga United		
2021–2023	BUL Jinja FC		
2023–2024	Kator		
2024	→ Al Merreikh (loan)		
2024-	Jamus		

International career^{‡}
2020–	South Sudan	24	(0)
- * Club domestic league appearances and goals as of 18 April 2025 ‡ National team caps and goals as of 18 April 2025

Ivan Wani Adebo Levi (born 12 December 1998), known as Ivan Wani, is a footballer who plays as a midfielder for South Sudan Premier League club Jamus. Born in Uganda, he plays for the South Sudan national team.

== International career ==
Wani has already played for the South Sudan national football team.
