= 2019 Africa Cup of Nations qualification preliminary round =

The preliminary round of the 2019 Africa Cup of Nations qualification tournament decided three teams which advanced to the group stage of the qualification tournament. The preliminary round consisted of the six lowest-ranked teams among the 51 entrants: Madagascar, São Tomé and Príncipe, South Sudan, Comoros, Djibouti, and Mauritius.

The six teams were drawn into three ties, played in home-and-away two-legged format between 22 and 28 March 2017.

The three winners advanced to the group stage to join the 45 teams which entered directly.

== Matches ==
If the aggregate score was tied after the second leg, the away goals rule was applied, and if still tied, extra time was not played, and a penalty shoot-out was used to determine the winner (Regulations Article 15).

| Team 1 | Agg. | Team 2 | 1st leg | 2nd leg |
|---|---|---|---|---|
| São Tomé and Príncipe | 2–4 | Madagascar | 0–1 | 2–3 |
| Comoros | 3–1 | Mauritius | 2–0 | 1–1 |
| Djibouti | 2–6 | South Sudan | 2–0 | 0–6 |

22 March 2017
15:30 UTC+0

| São Tomé and Príncipe | 0–1 | Madagascar |
|---|---|---|
| | Report | Diogo 68' (o.g.) |

Estádio Nacional 12 de Julho, São Tomé
Referee: Gauthier Marc Mihindou Mbina (Gabon)
26 March 2017
14:30 UTC+3

| Madagascar | 3–2 | São Tomé and Príncipe |
|---|---|---|
| Voavy 1', 17'; Andriamatsinoro 81' | Report | Harramiz 28'; Zé 84' |

Stade Municipal de Mahamasina, Antananarivo
Referee: Ahmad Imtehaz Heeralall (Mauritius)

Madagascar won 4–2 on aggregate and advanced to qualification Group A.

24 March 2017
15:00 UTC+3

| Comoros | 2–0 | Mauritius |
|---|---|---|
| Youssouf 53'; Alhadhur 75' | Report |

Stade Said Mohamed Cheikh, Mitsamiouli
Referee: Martin Elifhas Saanya (Tanzania)
28 March 2017
16:00 UTC+4

| Mauritius | 1–1 | Comoros |
|---|---|---|
| St. Martin 45' | Report | Ben Nabouhane 15' |

Stade Anjalay, Belle Vue Maurel
Referee: Nelson Fred (Seychelles)

Comoros won 3–1 on aggregate and advanced to qualification Group B.

22 March 2017
19:00 UTC+3

| Djibouti | 2–0 | South Sudan |
|---|---|---|
| Hamza 56'; Breik 65' | Report |

El Hadj Hassan Gouled Aptidon Stadium, Djibouti City
Referee: Zekarias Girma Fega (Ethiopia)
28 March 2017
16:30 UTC+3

| South Sudan | 6–0 | Djibouti |
|---|---|---|
| Wurube 11' (pen.); Moga 20', 27'; Pretino 44'; Athir 62'; Khamis 78' | Report |

Juba Stadium, Juba
Referee: Jean Claude Ishimwe (Rwanda)

South Sudan won 6–2 on aggregate and advanced to qualification Group C.

== Goalscorers ==
There were 18 goals scored in 6 matches, for an average of 3 goals per match.

2 goals

- (Madagascar) Paulin Voavy
- (South Sudan) James Moga

1 goal

- (Comoros) Chaker Alhadhur
- (Comoros) Ben Nabouhane
- (Comoros) Benjaloud Youssouf
- (Djibouti) Mohamed Salem Breik
- (Djibouti) Abdi Idleh Hamza
- (Madagascar) Carolus Andriamatsinoro
- (Mauritius) Walter Duprey St. Martin
- (São Tomé and Príncipe) Harramiz
- (São Tomé and Príncipe) Zé
- (South Sudan) Leon Uso Khamis
- (South Sudan) Dominic Abui Pretino
- (South Sudan) Athir Thomas
- (South Sudan) Duku Wurube

1 own goal

- (São Tomé and Príncipe) Jordão Diogo (against Madagascar)
