= Moussa Marega =

Malian footballer (born 1991)

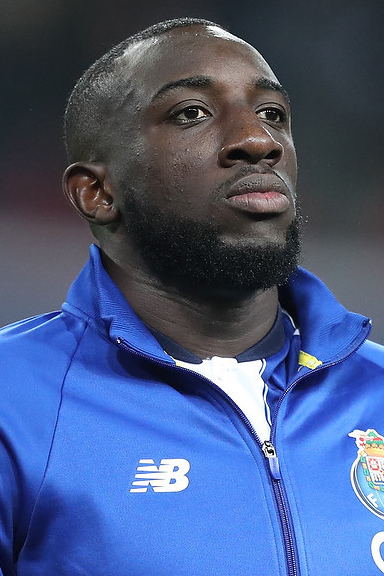
- Marega with Porto in 2018

Personal information
- Full name: Moussa Marega
- Date of birth: 14 April 1991 (age 35)
- Place of birth: Les Ulis, France
- Height: 1.84 m (6 ft 0 in)
- Position: Second striker

Team information
- Current team: Palm City FC
- Number: 7

Youth career
- 2006–2010: Évry

Senior career*
Years	Team	Apps	(Gls)
2010–2011	Évry	4	(0)
2011–2012	FC Issy	0	(0)
2012–2013	Le Poiré-sur-Vie	31	(5)
2013	Le Poiré-sur-Vie II	2	(0)
2013–2014	Amiens	33	(9)
2014	Espérance de Tunis	0	(0)
2015–2016	Marítimo	29	(12)
2016–2021	Porto	126	(52)
2016–2017	→ Vitória de Guimarães (loan)	25	(13)
2021–2023	Al Hilal	49	(18)
2023–2024	Sharjah	21	(7)
2024–2026	Al-Diriyah	32	(19)
2026	Palm City FC	5	(3)

International career^{‡}
2015–2019	Mali	25	(3)
- * Club domestic league appearances and goals as of 30 October 2026 ‡ National team caps and goals as of 15 July 2019

Moussa Marega (born 14 April 1991) is a professional footballer who plays as a second striker. Born in France, he played for the Mali national team.

He began his career in France, playing no higher than the Championnat National. After one year with Espérance in Tunisia, he moved to Marítimo of the Primeira Liga in 2015. Shortly afterwards, he signed for Porto. After spending 2016–17 on loan at Vitória de Guimarães, he became a regular in the Porto side and won two league titles in four years. In 2021, he signed with Saudi Arabian club Al Hilal, where he won the AFC Champions League in his first year.

Marega made his international debut for Mali in 2015, and was part of their squad at the Africa Cup of Nations in 2017 and 2019.

== Club career ==
=== Early career ===
Born in Les Ulis, Essonne, to Malian parents, Marega began his career at Évry FC, before moving to Vendée Poiré-sur-Vie Football of the Championnat National in 2012, and fellow league team Amiens a year later. He spent the second half of 2014 in ES Tunis, but could not make a single appearance due to bureaucratic problems.

He subsequently moved to Marítimo in Portugal's Primeira Liga in January 2015. In November 2015, he was sent off in a 1–0 loss at Amarante with two yellow cards and then gestured at the bench; he was suspended from training with the club as a result.

=== Porto ===
Both Marega and Marítimo goalkeeper José Sá were on the cusp of a move to Sporting CP in January 2016, but FC Porto signed the pair on contracts lasting to 2020; Marega's buyout clause was set at €40 million. He made 13 appearances in his first campaign at the Estádio do Dragão – mostly as a substitute – and scored once in a 2–0 home win over Gil Vicente in the Taça da Liga on 2 March. His early poor performances drew vocal criticism from some Porto fans, and he took training from a friend on how to become mentally resilient.

On 20 July 2016, Marega was loaned to Vitória de Guimarães for the upcoming season. He made his debut a month later in a 2–0 win against his former team, Marítimo, scoring the second goal, and on 30 October, he scored all three goals in a 3–0 win against Rio Ave to reach 10 goals from 8 games. On 4 November, he received a straight red card in the first half-hour of a 2–1 home win over Nacional for striking Nuno Sequeira, receiving a three-match ban.

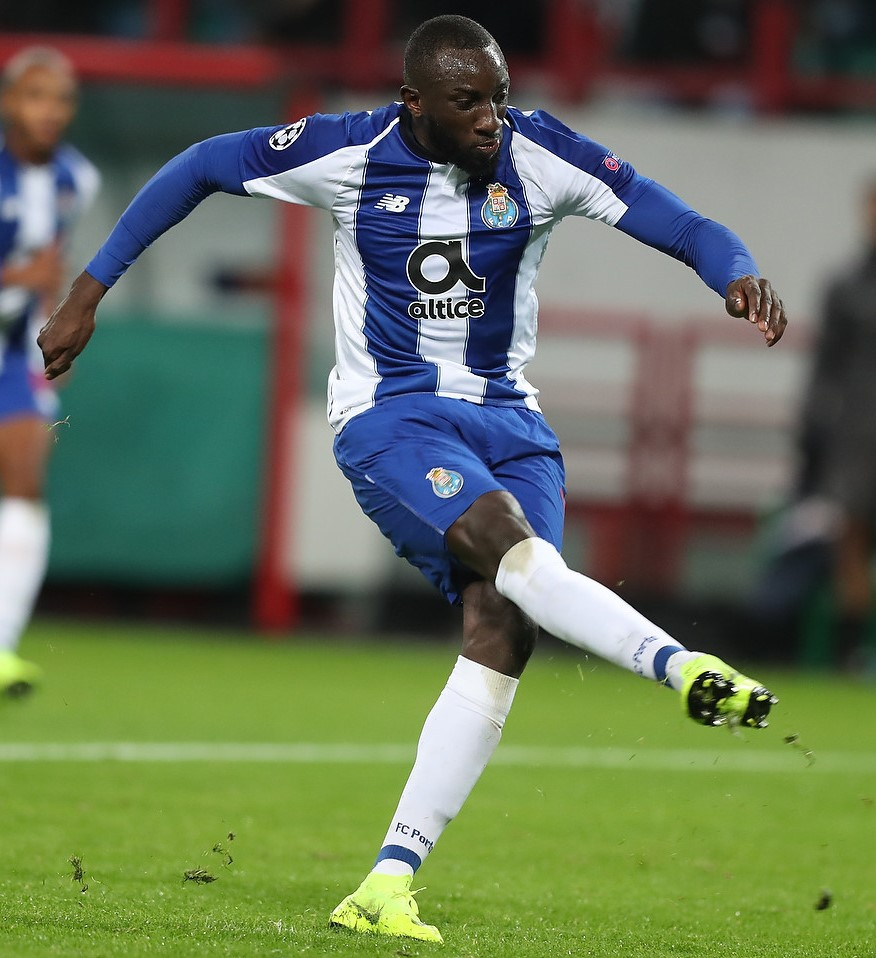
Marega against Lokomotiv Moscow in October 2018

On his return to Porto, Marega scored twice in the opening game of the 2017–18 season, a 4–0 home win over Estoril, as a first-half substitute for Tiquinho. He was part of a three-pronged attack made of African players, alongside the Cameroonian Vincent Aboubakar and the Algerian Yacine Brahimi. He scored 14 league goals in 14 starts, and reportedly began to attract the interest of Premier League sides Manchester United and Chelsea in January 2018. Porto won the league for the first time in five years and Marega was their top scorer (third overall behind Jonas and Bas Dost) with 22 goals.

In November 2018, Marega was awarded the Dragão de Ouro (Golden Dragon) as Porto's best player of the calendar year. Having not previously scored in a European match, Marega scored a goal in six consecutive appearances in the 2018–19 UEFA Champions League, starting with a goal in 1–0 win over Galatasaray, and ending with one in a 3–1 win over Roma, that put Porto in the quarter-finals for the first time in four years.

On 16 February 2020, after scoring the winning goal on his return to Vitória, Marega gave the middle finger to the home fans who had been racially abusing him. The insults continued after this incident and in response, he walked out of the game, and was subsequently substituted. His reaction to the abuse was praised by the Portuguese press, with A Bola newspaper giving Marega a perfect 10 rating in its player ratings. He scored in a 2–0 home win over Sporting on 15 July that year, as his team won the title with two games left to play. On 17 February 2021, he scored a goal in a 2–1 win over Juventus in the 2020–21 UEFA Champions League round of 16.

=== Al-Hilal ===
On 10 May 2021, Saudi Arabian club Al-Hilal announced the signing of Marega on a three-year contract as a free transfer, with a salary of €5 million per year. He won the AFC Champions League in his first year, with a goal in the semi-final 2–1 win at compatriots Al Nassr, followed by one in the 2–0 final victory over South Korea's Pohang Steelers.

At the 2022 FIFA Club World Cup, held the following February in Morocco, Marega scored in the final, a 5–3 loss to Real Madrid.

=== Sharjah ===
On 8 September 2023, Marega joined UAE Pro League club Sharjah.

=== Al-Diriyah ===
On 5 August 2024, Marega joined Saudi Second Division League club Al-Diriyah.

== International career ==
Marega made his debut for the Mali national team on 25 March 2015, in a friendly against Gabon in Beauvais, France; he started in the 4–3 defeat. On 4 September 2016, he scored his first international goal in a 2017 Africa Cup of Nations qualification game against Benin, helping towards a 5–2 win at the Stade du 26 Mars.

In January 2017, he was called up for Mali's squad at the final tournament in Gabon. In the Eagles' opening game against Egypt in Port-Gentil, he was named man of the match in a goalless draw. He also started the other two games of the group stage elimination.

Marega was also called up for the 2019 Africa Cup of Nations in Egypt. He scored in their opening game, a 4–1 win over Mauritania, as they made the last 16. Having not played since the 2019 edition, Marega was not called up for the 2021 Africa Cup of Nations in Cameroon.

== Personal life ==
Marega is a practising Muslim and moved to Saudi Arabia for reasons of faith. He became father to a son in 2017. His older brother Houssein Marega, played active football in France for FC Versailles 78 , SO Romorantin, Sainte-Geneviève Sports , as well as Scottish club Queen of the South.

== Career statistics ==
=== Club ===
As of match played 8 April 2026

Appearances and goals by club, season and competition
Club	Season	League			National cup (Note: Includes Coupe de France, Taça de Portugal, King Cup)		League cup (Note: Includes Taça da Liga)		Continental		Other		Total	
Club	Season	Division	Apps	Goals	Apps	Goals	Apps	Goals	Apps	Goals	Apps	Goals	Apps	Goals
Le Poiré-sur-Vie B	2012–13	CFA 2	2	0	—		—		—		—		2	0
Le Poiré-sur-Vie	2012–13	Championnat National	31	5	1	0	—		—		—		32	5
Amiens	2013–14	Championnat National	33	9	3	0	—		—		—		36	9
Espérance de Tunis	2014–15	Tunisian Ligue Professionnelle 1	0	0	0	0	0	0	—		—		0	0
Marítimo	2014–15	Primeira Liga	14	7	2	1	0	0	—		—		16	8
Marítimo	2015–16	Primeira Liga	15	5	2	1	1	1	—		—		18	7
Marítimo	Total		29	12	4	2	1	1	—		—		34	15
Porto	2015–16	Primeira Liga	9	0	2	1	0	0	2 (Note: Appearances in UEFA Europa League)	0	—		13	1
Porto	2017–18	Primeira Liga	29	22	2	0	3	1	6 (Note: Appearances in UEFA Champions League)	0	—		40	23
Porto	2018–19	Primeira Liga	29	11	5	2	4	2	9	6	—		47	21
Porto	2019–20	Primeira Liga	29	12	4	1	3	1	9 (Note: Two appearances in UEFA Champions League, seven appearances and one goal in UEFA Europa League)	1	—		45	15
Porto	2020–21	Primeira Liga	30	7	4	2	1	1	9	2	1 (Note: Appearance in Supertaça Cândido de Oliveira)	0	45	12
Porto	Total		126	52	17	6	11	5	35	9	1	0	190	72
Vitória de Guimarães (loan)	2016–17	Primeira Liga	25	13	4	1	2	0	—		—		31	14
Al Hilal	2021–22	Saudi Pro League	27	13	4	0	—		4 (Note: Appearances in AFC Champions League)	2	4 (Note: One appearance in Saudi Super Cup, three appearances and one goal in FIFA Club World Cup)	1	39	16
Al Hilal	2022–23	Saudi Pro League	22	5	2	0	—		8	3	4	1	36	9
Al Hilal	Total		49	18	6	0	—		12	5	8	2	75	25
Sharjah	2023–24	UAE Pro League	21	7	2	1	2	0	5	2	1	1	31	11
Diriyah Club	2025-26	Saudi First Division League	24	18	0	0	0	0	0	0	0	0	24	18
Career total			340	134	37	10	16	6	52	16	10	3	455	169

=== International ===
As of 15 July 2019

Appearances and goals by national team and year
National team	Year	Apps	Goals
Mali	2015	5	0
Mali	2016	4	1
Mali	2017	6	0
Mali	2018	4	1
Mali	2019	6	1
Total		25	3

Scores and results list Mali's goal tally first, score column indicates score after each Marega goal.

List of international goals scored by Moussa Marega
No.	Date	Venue	Opponent	Score	Result	Competition
1	4 September 2016	Stade du 26 Mars, Bamako, Mali	Benin	3–0	5–2	2017 Africa Cup of Nations qualification
2	9 September 2018	Juba Stadium, Juba, South Sudan	South Sudan	1–0	3–0	2019 Africa Cup of Nations qualification
3	24 June 2019	Suez Stadium, Suez, Egypt	Mauritania	2–0	4–1	2019 Africa Cup of Nations

== Honours ==
Porto

- Primeira Liga: 2017–18, 2019–20
- Taça de Portugal: 2019–20
- Supertaça Cândido de Oliveira: 2020

Al Hilal

- Saudi Pro League: 2021–22
- King Cup: 2022–23
- Saudi Super Cup: 2021
- AFC Champions League: 2021
- FIFA Club World Cup runner-up: 2022

Individual

- Primeira Liga Team of the Year: 2017–18
- Dragão de Ouro: 2018
