= Majak Mawith =

South Sudanese footballer

Personal information
- Full name: Majak Mawith
- Date of birth: 19 September 1999 (age 27)
- Place of birth: Kakuma, Kenya
- Height: 1.94 m (6 ft 4 in)
- Position: Goalkeeper

Team information
- Current team: Jamus

Youth career
- Dandenong City

Senior career*
Years	Team	Apps	(Gls)
2015	Dandenong City	1	(0)
2016–2018	Melbourne Victory NPL	44	(0)
2019	Melbourne City NPL	15	(0)
2019–2022	Port Melbourne	8	(0)
2023	Dandenong Thunder	20	(0)
2024-	Jamus		

International career^{‡}
2019–	South Sudan	23	(0)
- * Club domestic league appearances and goals as of 18 April 2025 ‡ National team caps and goals as of 18 April 2025

Majak Mawith (born 19 September 1999) is a professional footballer who plays as a goalkeeper for South Sudan Premier League club Jamus. Born in Kenya and raised in Australia, he plays for the South Sudan national team.
