= Peter Lazarus =

South Sudanese footballer

Personal information
- Full name: Lazarus Peter George Laku
- Date of birth: 29 May 2008 (age 18)
- Place of birth: Juba, South Sudan
- Position: Forward

Team information
- Current team: IFK Göteborg

Youth career
- 2022–2026: Future Stars Academy
- 2026–: IFK Göteborg

Senior career*
Years	Team	Apps	(Gls)
2026–	IFK Göteborg	0	(0)

International career^{‡}
2024	South Sudan U17	4	(3)
2025–	South Sudan	1	(0)
- * Club domestic league appearances and goals as of 16:52, 25 July 2026 (UTC) ‡ National team caps and goals as of 13:27, 17 June 2025 (UTC)

Lazarus Peter George Laku (born 29 May 2008), commonly known as Peter Lazarus, is a South Sudanese footballer who plays as a forward for Allsvenskan club IFK Göteborg and the South Sudan national team.

== Club career ==
As a youth, Lazarus played for Future Stars Academy. In June 2025, after more than a year of unsuccessful attempts to secure a visa, Lazarus joined Swedish side IFK Göteborg in the Allsvenskan. Initially joining on a pre-contract, he would be eligible for a professional contract at age eighteen. Other clubs abroad who were reportedly interested in the player at the time included Sporting CP. On 25 July 2026, Lazarus signed a five-year contract with IFK Göteborg.

== International career ==
As a youth, Lazarus represented South Sudan in the 2023 CECAFA U-15 Championship. He went on to be the tournament's top goal scorer as South Sudan finished fourth. The following year, he was part of the South Sudan under-17 team that competed in 2025 U-17 Africa Cup of Nations qualification. He scored against Somalia and Sudan in the group stage. He scored against Somalia again in the play-off round but South Sudan ultimately fell on penalties and failed to qualify for the final tournament. Lazarus served as team captain during the competition.

In June 2024, Lazarus was called up to the senior national team for 2026 FIFA World Cup qualification matches against Togo and Sudan. He made his senior debut on 21 March 2025 in a qualifier against the DR Congo at age sixteen.

=== International career statistics ===
As of match played 21 March 2025

National team	Year	Apps	Goals
South Sudan	2025	1	0
Total		1	0
