= 2019 Africa Cup of Nations qualification Group C =

Group C of the 2019 Africa Cup of Nations qualification tournament was one of the twelve groups to decide the teams which qualified for the 2019 Africa Cup of Nations finals tournament. The group consisted of four teams: Mali, Gabon, Burundi, and South Sudan (winners of the preliminary round).

The teams played against each other in home-and-away round-robin format between June 2017 and March 2019.

Mali and Burundi, the group winners and runners-up respectively, qualified for the 2019 Africa Cup of Nations.

== Standings ==
| Pos | Team | Pld | W | D | L | GF | GA | GD | Pts | Qualification | Mali national football team | Burundi national football team | Gabon national football team | South Sudan national football team |
|---|---|---|---|---|---|---|---|---|---|---|---|---|---|---|
| 1 | Mali | 6 | 4 | 2 | 0 | 10 | 2 | +8 | 14 | Final tournament | — | 0–0 | 2–1 | 3–0 |
| 2 | Burundi | 6 | 2 | 4 | 0 | 11 | 5 | +6 | 10 | Final tournament | 1–1 | — | 1–1 | 3–0 |
| 3 | Gabon | 6 | 2 | 2 | 2 | 7 | 5 | +2 | 8 | | 0–1 | 1–1 | — | 3–0 |
| 4 | South Sudan | 6 | 0 | 0 | 6 | 2 | 18 | −16 | 0 | | 0–3 | 2–5 | 0–1 | — |

Source: CAF
Rules for classification: Qualification tiebreakers

== Matches ==
10 June 2017
15:00 UTC+2

| Burundi | 3–0 | South Sudan |
|---|---|---|
| Amissi 12'; Duhayindavyi 16'; Abdul Razak 30' | Report |

Prince Louis Rwagasore Stadium, Bujumbura
Referee: Kokou Fagla (Togo)
10 June 2017
19:00 UTC+0

| Mali | 2–1 | Gabon |
|---|---|---|
| K. Coulibaly 54'; Bissouma 57' | Report | Bouanga 3' |

Stade du 26 Mars, Bamako
Referee: Daniel Bennett (South Africa)

8 September 2018
16:00 UTC+1

| Gabon | 1–1 | Burundi |
|---|---|---|
| Aubameyang 75' | Report | Berahino 38' |

Stade d'Angondjé, Libreville
Referee: Bernard Camille (Seychelles)
9 September 2018
16:00 UTC+3

| South Sudan | 0–3 | Mali |
|---|---|---|
| | Report | Marega 45'; S. Coulibaly 71'; Traoré 87' |

Juba Stadium, Juba
Referee: Rédouane Jiyed (Morocco)

12 October 2018
16:00 UTC+1

| Gabon | 3–0 | South Sudan |
|---|---|---|
| Bouanga 27'; Appindangoyé 58'; James 87' (o.g.) | Report |

Stade d'Angondjé, Libreville
Referee: Alhadi Mahamat (Chad)
12 October 2018
19:00 UTC+0

| Mali | 0–0 | Burundi |
|---|---|---|
| | Report |

Stade du 26 Mars, Bamako
Referee: Maguette N'Diaye (Senegal)

16 October 2018
15:00 UTC+2

| Burundi | 1–1 | Mali |
|---|---|---|
| Abdul Razak 9' | Report | Fofana 48' |

Prince Louis Rwagasore Stadium, Bujumbura
Referee: Celso Alvação (Mozambique)
16 October 2018
16:00 UTC+3

| South Sudan | 0–1 | Gabon |
|---|---|---|
| | Report | Poko 59' |

Juba Stadium, Juba
Referee: Mohamed Ali Moussa (Niger)

16 November 2018
16:00 UTC+3

| South Sudan | 2–5 | Burundi |
|---|---|---|
| Lual 11'; Aboi 63' | Report | Abdul Razak 12', 73', 89', 90+1'; Amissi 39' |

Juba Stadium, Juba
Referee: Souleiman Ahmed Djama (Djibouti)
17 November 2018
16:00 UTC+1

| Gabon | 0–1 | Mali |
|---|---|---|
| | Report | Doumbia 11' |

Stade d'Angondjé, Libreville
Referee: El Fadil Mohamed (Sudan)

23 March 2019
15:00 UTC+2

| Burundi | 1–1 | Gabon |
|---|---|---|
| Amissi 76' | Report | Ngando 82' (o.g.) |

Prince Louis Rwagasore Stadium, Bujumbura
Referee: Gehad Grisha (Egypt)
23 March 2019
19:00 UTC+0

| Mali | 3–0 | South Sudan |
|---|---|---|
| K. Coulibaly 18'; Djenepo 28'; Traoré 90' | Report |

Stade du 26 Mars, Bamako
Referee: Alex Muhabi (Uganda)

== Goalscorers ==
There were 30 goals scored in 12 matches, for an average of 2.5 goals per match.

6 goals

- (Burundi) Fiston Abdul Razak

3 goals

- (Burundi) Cédric Amissi

2 goals

- (Gabon) Denis Bouanga
- (Mali) Kalifa Coulibaly
- (Mali) Adama Traoré

1 goal

- (Burundi) Saido Berahino
- (Burundi) Gaël Duhayindavyi
- (Gabon) Aaron Appindangoyé
- (Gabon) Pierre-Emerick Aubameyang
- (Gabon) André Biyogo Poko
- (Mali) Yves Bissouma
- (Mali) Salif Coulibaly
- (Mali) Moussa Djenepo
- (Mali) Moussa Doumbia
- (Mali) Mamadou Fofana
- (Mali) Moussa Marega
- (South Sudan) Dominic Aboi
- (South Sudan) Atak Lual

1 own goal

- (Burundi) Omar Ngando (against Gabon)
- (South Sudan) Hassan James (against Gabon)
