= Leon Uso Khamis =

South Sudanese footballer (born 1987)

Personal information
- Date of birth: 1 January 1987 (age 39)
- Place of birth: Wau, Sudan (now South Sudan)
- Position: Striker

Senior career*
| Years | Team | Apps | (Gls) |
| 2011– | Wau Salaam | ? | (1) |

International career^{‡}
| 2012– | South Sudan | 29 | (3) |
- * Club domestic league appearances and goals as of 29 November 2012 ‡ National team caps and goals as of 29 November 2021

Leon Uso Khamis is a South Sudanese footballer who currently plays as a striker. He is the vice-captain of the national team. He captained the team in the 2012 CECAFA Cup in the absence of Richard Justin and James Moga.

== International career ==
He has made at least two senior appearances for South Sudan against Ethiopia and Kenya in the 2012 CECAFA Cup.

=== International goals ===
Scores and results list South Sudan's goal tally first.

| No | Date | Venue | Opponent | Score | Result | Competition |
|---|---|---|---|---|---|---|
| 1. | 28 March 2017 | Juba Stadium, Juba, South Sudan | Djibouti | 6–0 | 6–0 | 2019 Africa Cup of Nations qualification |
| 2. | 22 April 2017 | El Hadj Hassan Gouled Aptidon Stadium, Djibouti City, Djibouti | Somalia | 2–1 | 2–1 | 2018 African Nations Championship qualification |
| 3. | 22 July 2017 | Phillip Omondi Stadium, Kampala, Uganda | Uganda | 1–5 | 1–5 | 2018 African Nations Championship qualification |

== Club career ==
Wau Salaam FC became the first ever South Sudanese football club in the 2012 Kagame Interclub Cup. Although the team was humiliated and faced some heavy defeats, Khamis managed to reserve some pride by becoming the only Wau Salaam and South Sudanese scorer in the 2012 Kagame InterClub Cup, showing his talents amongst a 7-1 thrashing.
