= Sebit Bruno =

South Sudanese footballer

Personal information
- Full name: Sebit Bruno Martinez
- Date of birth: March 16, 1994 (age 32)
- Place of birth: Juba, Sudan (now South Sudan)
- Height: 5 ft 9 in (1.75 m)
- Position: Midfielder

Team information
- Current team: Kator FC
- Number: 10

Senior career*
Years	Team	Apps	(Gls)
2014	Kator FC	30	(23)

International career^{‡}
2015	South Sudan	10	(3)
- * Club domestic league appearances and goals ‡ National team caps and goals as of 23:59, 27 March 2017 (UTC)

Sebit Bruno (born 16 March 1994) is a South Sudanese footballer who plays as a midfielder. He is the top scorer of the national team with 3 goals, as of 27 March 2016.

== International career ==
=== International goals ===
Scores and results list South Sudan's goal tally first.

No	Date	Venue	Opponent	Score	Result	Competition
1.	23 November 2015	Bahir Dar Stadium, Bahir Dar, Ethiopia	Djibouti	1–0	2–0	2015 CECAFA Cup
2.	27 November 2017	Bahir Dar Stadium, Bahir Dar, Ethiopia	Malawi	2–0	2–0	2015 CECAFA Cup
3.	23 March 2016	Juba Stadium, Juba, South Sudan	Benin	1–2	1–2	2017 Africa Cup of Nations qualification
