= Loki Emmanuel =

South Sudanese footballer

Personal information
- Full name: Loki Emmanuel Peter Loki
- Date of birth: 14 November 2001 (age 24)
- Position: Forward

Team information
- Current team: Bright Stars

Senior career*
Years	Team	Apps	(Gls)
2021–	Bright Stars		

International career^{‡}
2019	South Sudan U20	2	(0)
2020–	South Sudan	2	(1)
- * Club domestic league appearances and goals as of 19:32, 1 February 2022 (UTC) ‡ National team caps and goals as of 19:32, 1 February 2022 (UTC)

Loki Emmanuel (born 14 November 2001) is a South Sudanese professional footballer who plays as a forward for Uganda Premier League club Bright Stars and the South Sudan national team.

== Club career ==
In October 2020 Emmanuel signed for Bright Stars of the Uganda Premier League on a 3-year contract.

== International career ==
Emmanuel made two appearances for South Sudan in the 2019 CECAFA U-20 Championship. He made his senior international debut on 6 October 2021 in a friendly against Sierra Leone. He scored his first international goal in the match, an eventual 1–1 draw.

=== International goals ===
Scores and results list South Sudan's goal tally first.

No	Date	Venue	Opponent	Score	Result	Competition
1.	6 October 2021	Stade El Abdi, El Jadida, Morocco	Sierra Leone	1–1	1–1	Friendly
Last updated 1 February 2022

=== International career statistics ===
As of match played 12 october 2021

National team	Year	Apps	Goals
South Sudan	2021	2	1
South Sudan	2022	0	0
Total		2	1
