= Salyi Lolaku Samuel =

South Sudanese football manager

Lolaku Samuel
Personal information
- Full name: Salyi Lolaku Samuel
- Place of birth: South Sudan

Managerial career
- Years: Team
- 2014: South Sudan

Salyi Lolaku Samuel is a South Sudanese professional football manager. He was named as caretaker manager of the South Sudan national football team for the friendly game versus Botswana in March 2014.
