= Cyprian Besong Ashu =

Cameroonian footballer (born 1969)

Ashu Cyprian Besongo
Personal information
- Full name: Ashu Cyprian Besongo
- Date of birth: 21 October 1969 (age 57)
- Place of birth: Germany

Senior career*
Years	Team	Apps	(Gls)
1984–1985	PWD Bamenda		
1985–1987	Aigle Nkongsamba		
1987–1989	Colombe de Sangmélima		
1989–1991	Unisport FC de Bafang		
1992–1994	Fortuna Düsseldorf II	52	(11)
1994–1997	Borussia Mönchengladbach II	38	(6)
1997–1999	1. FC Viersen	56	(9)

Managerial career
- 1999–2002: Viktoria Rheyt FC
- 2012: AS Inter Star
- 2014: Mirbat SC
- 2016: Cameroon U20
- 2019–2021: South Sudan
- 2026: South Sudan (interim)
- * Club domestic league appearances and goals

Ashu Cyprian Besongo (born 21 October 1969) is a Cameroonian football manager and former player.

== Career ==
Besong was born in Germany.

In 2005, he was a coach at Welwyn Garden City. He was a U21 assistant coach at Leicester City.

In July 2019, he was appointed manager of the South Sudan national team.
