= 2017 Africa Cup of Nations qualification Group C =

Football tournament qualification stage

Group C of the 2017 Africa Cup of Nations qualification tournament was one of the thirteen groups to decide the teams which qualified for the 2017 Africa Cup of Nations finals tournament. The group consisted of four teams: Mali, Equatorial Guinea, Benin, and South Sudan.

The teams played against each other home-and-away in a round-robin format, between June 2015 and September 2016.

Mali, the group winners, qualified for the 2017 Africa Cup of Nations.

== Standings ==
Pos	Team	Pld	W	D	L	GF	GA	GD	Pts	Qualification	Mali	Benin	Equatorial Guinea	South Sudan
1	Mali	6	5	1	0	13	3	+10	16	Final tournament	—	5–2	1–0	2–0
2	Benin	6	3	2	1	12	10	+2	11		1–1	—	2–1	4–1
3	Equatorial Guinea	6	1	1	4	6	6	0	4		0–1	1–1	—	4–0
4	South Sudan	6	1	0	5	3	15	−12	3		0–3	1–2	1–0	—

Source: CAF
Rules for classification: Qualification tiebreakers

== Matches ==
13 June 2015
19:00 UTC±0

Mali	2–0	South Sudan
Maïga 17'; S. Coulibaly 28'	Report

Stade du 26 Mars, Bamako
Referee: Joshua Amao (Nigeria)
14 June 2015
16:00 UTC+1

Equatorial Guinea	1–1	Benin
Nsue 49'	Report	Sessègnon 42'

Estadio de Bata, Bata
Referee: Victor Gomes (South Africa)

5 September 2015
16:30 UTC+3

South Sudan	1–0	Equatorial Guinea
Bentiu 51'	Report

Juba Stadium, Juba
Referee: Israel Mujuni (Tanzania)
6 September 2015
16:00 UTC+1

Benin	1–1	Mali
Sessègnon 33'	Report	Diaby 19'

Stade de l'Amitié, Cotonou
Referee: Eric Otogo-Castane (Gabon)

23 March 2016
16:30 UTC+3

South Sudan	1–2	Benin
Bruno 88'	Report	Gounongbe 11'; Mounié 73'

Juba Stadium, Juba
Referee: Thierry Nkurunziza (Burundi)
25 March 2016
19:00 UTC±0

Mali	1–0	Equatorial Guinea
Wagué 81'	Report

Stade du 26 Mars, Bamako
Referee: Denis Dembélé (Ivory Coast)

27 March 2016
16:00 UTC+1

Benin	4–1	South Sudan
Sessègnon 23', 89'; Poté 37'; Dossou 71'	Report	Lual 83'

Stade de l'Amitié, Cotonou
Referee: Ali Lemghaifry (Mauritania)
28 March 2016
17:00 UTC+1

Equatorial Guinea	0–1	Mali
	Report	M. Yatabaré 90'

Estadio de Malabo, Malabo
Referee: Bernard Camille (Seychelles)

4 June 2016
16:30 UTC+3

South Sudan	0–3	Mali
	Report	Diaby 35'; Maïga 47'; Doumbia 58'

Juba Stadium, Juba
Referee: Djamal Aden (Djibouti)
12 June 2016 (Note: The Benin v Equatorial Guinea match was postponed from the original date of 5 June 2016 to 12 June 2016, due to the suspension of the Benin Football Federation by FIFA. The match would be cancelled and the CAF would rule on the case if the condition for lifting the suspension was not met by 11 June 2016. A new president was elected on 10 June 2016, and as a result, the suspension was lifted and the match would take place accordingly.)
16:00 UTC+1

Benin	2–1	Equatorial Guinea
Adénon 25'; Djigla 60'	Report	Zarandona 59'

Stade de l'Amitié, Cotonou
Referee: Bakary Gassama (Gambia)

4 September 2016
17:00 UTC+1

Equatorial Guinea	4–0	South Sudan
Miranda 54'; Randy 59'; Nsue 67'; Akapo 90'	Report

Estadio de Malabo, Malabo
Referee: Hélder Martins de Carvalho (Angola)
4 September 2016
17:30 UTC±0

Mali	5–2	Benin
S. Yatabaré 19'; Diaby 36'; Marega 39'; Traoré 65'; Doumbia 80'	Report	Gounongbe 40'; Sessègnon 90'

Stade du 26 Mars, Bamako
Referee: Gehad Grisha (Egypt)

== Goalscorers ==
5 goals

- (Benin) Stéphane Sessègnon

3 goals

- (Mali) Abdoulay Diaby

2 goals

- (Benin) Frédéric Gounongbe
- (Equatorial Guinea) Emilio Nsue
- (Mali) Moussa Doumbia
- (Mali) Modibo Maïga

1 goal

- (Benin) Khaled Adénon
- (Benin) David Djigla
- (Benin) Jodel Dossou
- (Benin) Steve Mounié
- (Benin) Mickaël Poté
- (Equatorial Guinea) Carlos Akapo
- (Equatorial Guinea) Josete Miranda
- (Equatorial Guinea) Randy
- (Equatorial Guinea) Iván Zarandona
- (Mali) Salif Coulibaly
- (Mali) Moussa Marega
- (Mali) Adama Traoré
- (Mali) Molla Wagué
- (Mali) Mustapha Yatabaré
- (Mali) Sambou Yatabaré
- (South Sudan) Chol Peter Bentiu
- (South Sudan) Sebit Bruno
- (South Sudan) Atak Lual
