= Chaker Alhadhur =

Footballer (born 1991)

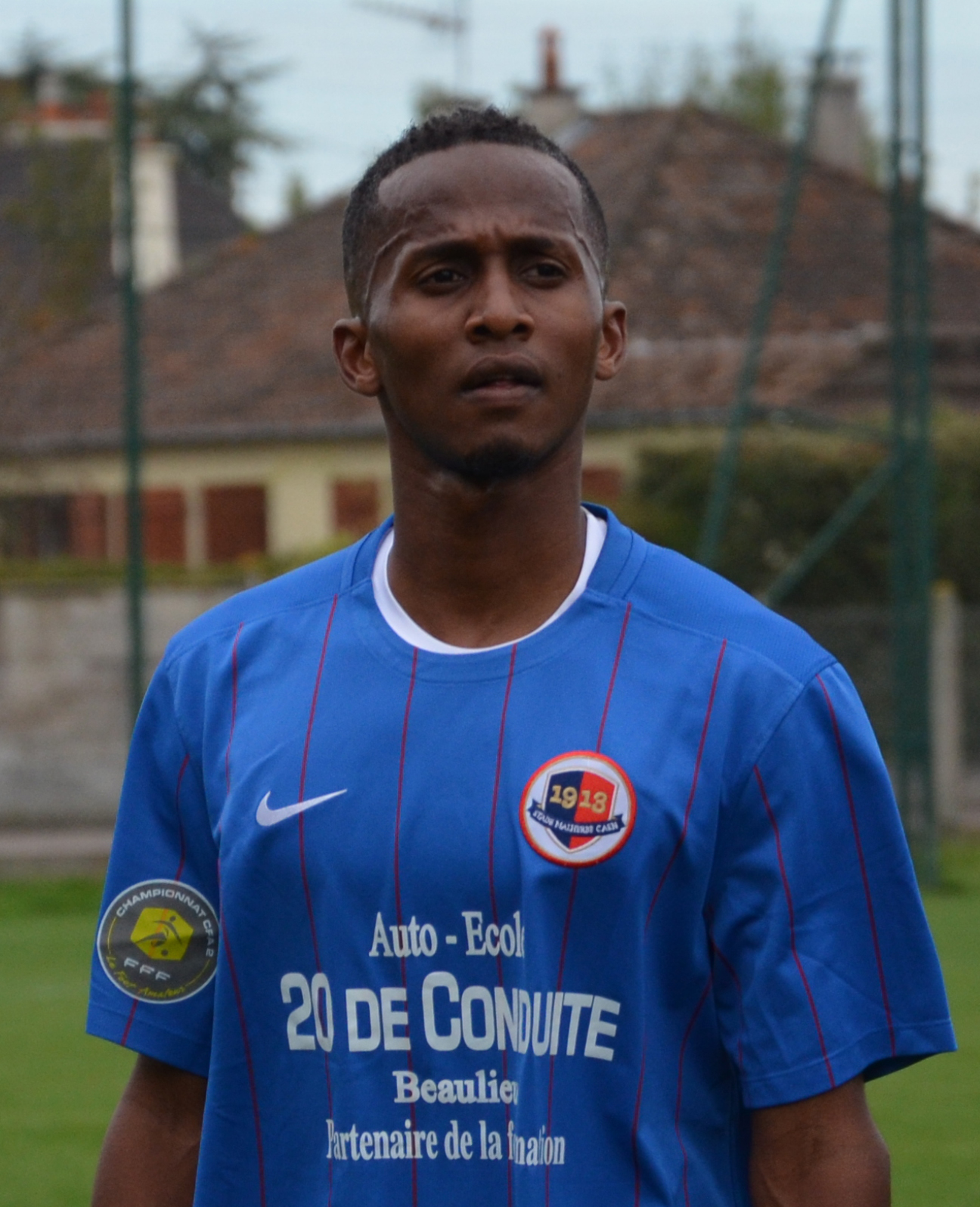
- Alhadhur with Caen in 2015

Personal information
- Date of birth: 4 December 1991 (age 34)
- Place of birth: Nantes, France
- Height: 1.72 m (5 ft 8 in)
- Positions: Left-back; left midfielder

Senior career*
Years	Team	Apps	(Gls)
2010–2015	Nantes	38	(0)
2011–2012	→ Bayonne (loan)	1	(0)
2012–2015	Nantes B	16	(3)
2015–2018	Caen	10	(0)
2015–2017	Caen B	2	(0)
2017–2018	→ Châteauroux (loan)	32	(2)
2019–2021	Châteauroux	48	(2)
2021–2023	Ajaccio	1	(0)
2021–2023	Ajaccio B	10	(1)

International career
2014–2022	Comoros	33	(1)
- * Club domestic league appearances and goals

Chaker Alhadhur (born 4 December 1991) is a professional footballer who plays as a left-back or left midfielder. Born in France, he played for the Comoros national team.

== Club career ==
Alhadhur made his professional debut for his hometown club Nantes during the 2010–11 season. On 2 December 2011, he signed on loan with Championnat National side Aviron Bayonnais until the end of the season, after a proposed loan to Épinal fell through for financial reasons.

In December 2018, Alhadhur left Caen to sign a contract with Châteauroux in January 2019. On 12 October 2021, he signed for Ajaccio.

== International career ==
Alhadhur debuted with the Comoros national team on 5 March 2014.

In 2022, he was in the Comoros squad which reached the knockout stages of the delayed 2021 Africa Cup of Nations. He played as a goalkeeper in a Round of 16 match against hosts Cameroon after the Comoros were left with no fit goalkeepers due to a combination of injuries and positive COVID-19 tests.

== Career statistics ==
=== International ===
Scores and results list Comoros goal tally first, score column indicates score after each Alhadhur goal.

List of international goals scored by Chaker Alhadhur
No.	Date	Venue	Opponent	Score	Result	Competition
1	24 March 2017	Stade Said Mohamed Cheikh, Mitsamiouli, Comoros	Mauritius	2–0	2–0	2019 Africa Cup of Nations qualification
