= Peter Chol =

South Sudanese footballer

Chuol Peter Bentiu Danhier
Personal information
- Full name: Chuol Peter Bentiu Danhier
- Date of birth: 23 October 1994 (age 32)
- Place of birth: Malakal, Sudan
- Height: 1.70 m (5 ft 7 in)
- Position: Midfielder

Team information
- Current team: El Merriekh Bentiu

Senior career*
Years	Team	Apps	(Gls)
2015–2023	Kator		
2017–2018	→ Adama City (loan)		
2022–2023	→ Al-Nasr Omdurman (loan)		
2023–	El Merriekh Bentiu		

International career^{‡}
2015–	South Sudan	47	(4)
- * Club domestic league appearances and goals ‡ National team caps and goals as of 24 March 2026

Chuol Peter Bentiu Danhier (born 23 October 1994) is a footballer who plays as a midfielder for South Sudan Premier League (SSPL) club El Merriekh Bentiu and the South Sudan national team. He is South Sudan's most capped player at an international level, with 46 caps for the senior national team.

== International career ==
Chol capped for South Sudan at senior level during the 2019 Africa Cup of Nations qualification Group C.

== Career statistics ==
=== International ===
As of match played 13 October 2025.

Appearances and goals by national team and year
National team	Year	Apps	Goals
South Sudan	2015	1	1
South Sudan	2016	4	0
South Sudan	2017	8	0
South Sudan	2018	4	0
South Sudan	2019	4	0
South Sudan	2020	0	0
South Sudan	2021	0	0
South Sudan	2022	8	1
South Sudan	2023	8	2
South Sudan	2024	10	0
South Sudan	2025	4	0
Total		47	4

As of match played 13 October 2025
Scores and results list South Sudan's goal tally first, score column indicates score after each Chol goal

List of international goals scored by Peter Chol
No.	Date	Venue	Cap	Opponent	Score	Result	Competition
1	5 September 2015	Juba Stadium, Juba, South Sudan	1	Equatorial Guinea	1–0	1–0	2017 Africa Cup of Nations qualification
2	27 March 2022	St. Mary's Stadium-Kitende, Entebbe, Uganda	24	Djibouti	1–0	1–0	2023 Africa Cup of Nations qualification
3	23 March 2023	Stade Alphonse Massemba-Débat, Brazzaville, Republic of the Congo	30	Congo	2–0	2–1	2023 Africa Cup of Nations qualification
4	14 June 2023	Suez Canal Stadium, Ismailia, Egypt	36	Gambia	2–2	2–3	2023 Africa Cup of Nations qualification
