= Walter Duprey St. Martin =

Mauritian footballer

Personal information
- Full name: Walter Duprey St. Martin
- Date of birth: 7 July 1984 (age 42)
- Place of birth: Port Mathurin, Rodrigues, Mauritius
- Height: 1.79 m (5 ft 10 in)
- Positions: Defender; midfielder

Team information
- Current team: Pamplemousses

Senior career*
Years	Team	Apps	(Gls)
2010	Vacoas-Phoenix		
2011–2014	Cercle de Joachim		
2014–2015	Curepipe Starlight		
2015–	Pamplemousses		

International career
2014–2023	Mauritius	25	(1)
- * Club domestic league appearances and goals

Walter Duprey St. Martin (born 7 July 1984) is a Mauritian professional footballer who plays as a defender and midfielder for Mauritian Premier League club Pamplemousses.

== Career statistics ==
=== International ===
Appearances and goals by national team and year
National team	Year	Apps	Goals
Mauritius	2014	1	0
Mauritius	2015	1	0
Mauritius	2016	–	
Mauritius	2017	6	1
Mauritius	2018	4	0
Mauritius	2019	10	0
Mauritius	2020	–	
Mauritius	2021	–	
Mauritius	2022	1	0
Mauritius	2023	2	0
Total		25	1

Scores and results list Mauritius' goal tally first, score column indicates score after each St. Martin goal.

List of international goals scored by Walter Duprey St. Martin
No.	Date	Venue	Opponent	Score	Result	Competition
1	28 March 2017	Anjalay Stadium, Belle Vue Harel, Mauritius	Comoros	1–1	1–1	2019 Africa Cup of Nations qualification
