= Khamis Martin =

South Sudanese footballer

Personal information
- Full name: Khamis Martin Wani
- Date of birth: 5 October 1986 (age 40)
- Position: Midfielder

Team information
- Current team: Al-Mourada Omdurman

Senior career*
Years	Team	Apps	(Gls)
2009	Al-Merreikh Omdurman		
2010–	Al-Mourada Omdurman		

International career
2010	Sudan	1	(0)
2012–	South Sudan	1	(0)
- * Club domestic league appearances and goals as of 29 November 2012

Khamis Martin (born October 5, 1986) is a South Sudanese footballer who currently plays as a midfielder.

== International career ==
He has made at least one senior appearances for South Sudan against Kenya in the 2012 CECAFA Cup. Previously, he played one international for Sudan in 2010.
