= Atak Lual =

South Sudanese footballer (born 1983)

Personal information
- Full name: Atak Lual Wol Tong
- Date of birth: 11 September 1983 (age 43)
- Place of birth: Aweil, Sudan (now South Sudan)
- Position: Striker

Team information
- Current team: Simba FC (Juba)
- Number: 9

Senior career*
Years	Team	Apps	(Gls)
2009–2012	Al Mirghani ESC	50	(20)
2012–2014	Al Rabita Kosti	36	(30)
2014-2017	Al-Ahly Shendi	60	(35)
2018	Hay Al Wadi SC		
2018-2019	Al Ahli SC (Khartoum)		
2019-2020	El-Hilal SC El-Obeid		
2020-2021	Al Ahli SC (Khartoum)		
2021-2022	Tuti SC		
2022-	Simba FC (Juba)		

International career^{‡}
2014–	South Sudan	13	(3)
- * Club domestic league appearances and goals ‡ National team caps and goals as of 8 December 2017

Atak Lual Wol Tong (born 11 September 1983 in Aweil, Sudan) is a South Sudanese footballer, who plays as a forward for Sudanese club Simba FC (Juba).

== International career ==
He has made two senior appearances for South Sudan against Mozambique in the 2015 Africa Cup of Nations qualification. On 5 September 2015, Lual scored the winning goal in the first competitive victory in South Sudanese history.

=== International goals ===
Scores and results list South Sudan's goal tally first.

No	Date	Venue	Opponent	Score	Result	Competition
1.	27 March 2016	Stade de l'Amitié, Cotonou, Benin	Benin	1–3	1–4	2017 Africa Cup of Nations qualification
2.	7 December 2017	Bukhungu Stadium, Kakamega, Kenya	Uganda	1–2	1–5	2017 CECAFA Cup
3.	16 November 2018	Juba Stadium, Juba, South Sudan	Burundi	1–0	2–5	2019 Africa Cup of Nations qualification

== Honours ==
With Al-Ahly Shendi

Champion = 1 • Sudan Cup
