= Leo Adraa =

Ugandan footballer and coach

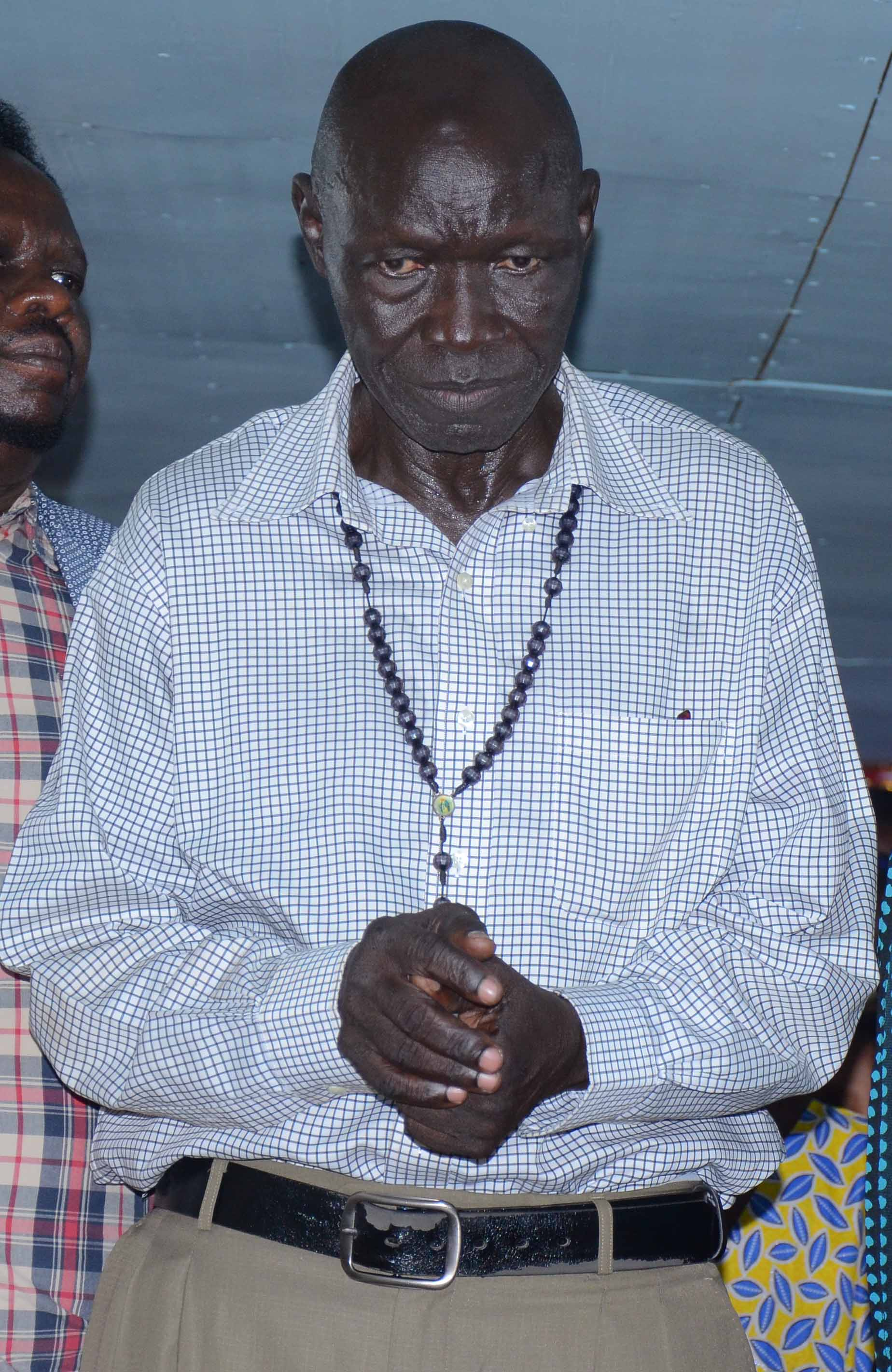
- Leo Adraa

Personal information
- Place of birth: Uganda

International career
Years	Team	Apps	(Gls)
- Uganda

Managerial career
- 1999: Uganda U23
- 2003–2004: Uganda
- Atlabara FC
- 2016: South Sudan
- 2016–20xx: Onduparaka FC

Leo Adraa is a football coach and former football player from Uganda.

== South Sudan ==
Winning the South Sudan domestic league with Atlabara FC, Adraa would lead the club to the 2014 CAF Champions League, the first time a South Sudanese club would compete in the competition.

Appointed caretaker coach of the South Sudan national team in 2016, the Ugandan was to lead the squad for the two remaining 2017 Africa Cup of Nations qualifiers; however, he resigned from the position after one match that year because of the football associations's negligence towards his salary, citing unpaid wages. Adraa has stated he would never return to South Sudan again.
