= Valentino Yuel =

South Sudanese and Australian footballer

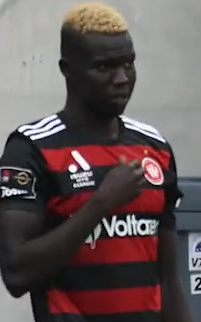
- Yuel playing for Western Sydney Wanderers in 2023

Personal information
- Full name: Valentino Kuach Yuel
- Date of birth: 12 October 1994 (age 32)
- Place of birth: Kakuma, Kenya
- Height: 1.82 m (6 ft 0 in)
- Positions: Forward; winger

Youth career
- 2009–2011: Adelaide Comets

Senior career*
Years	Team	Apps	(Gls)
2011–2012	Adelaide Comets	2	(0)
2013–2014	Cumberland United	40	(13)
2015–2016	Campbelltown City		(3)
2017	Adelaide Comets	22	(5)
2018	Adelaide City	22	(4)
2019	Bentleigh Greens	12	(8)
2019–2020	Western United	9	(0)
2020–2022	Newcastle Jets	45	(10)
2022–2023	Aluminium Arak	12	(0)
2023	→ Umm Salal (loan)	7	(1)
2023–2024	Western Sydney Wanderers	7	(2)
2024	Nasaf	6	(0)
2025	Al-Murooj	8	(3)
2025–2026	Eastern District	17	(4)

International career^{‡}
2022–	South Sudan	25	(3)
- * Club domestic league appearances and goals as of 16 May 2026 ‡ National team caps and goals as of 13 October 2025

Valentino Kuach Yuel (born 12 October 1994) is a professional footballer who plays as a winger. Born in Kenya and raised in Australia, he plays for the South Sudan national team.

== Early life ==
Valentino Kuach Yuel was born on 12 October 1994 in Kakuma, Kenya, the son of South Sudanese refugees. His early years were spent in refugee camps, before his parents were able to migrate to Australia, where they settled in Adelaide, South Australia, along with his six siblings. Yuel was 10 years old upon arrival in Adelaide, and was unable to speak English at first, but started attending school in Adelaide and soon became fluent.

He first played for a local community club, the Plympton Bulldogs, in the southern Adelaide suburb of Plympton Park.

== Club career ==
Yuel had his senior debut at the Adelaide Comets aged 16, and then played for a number of teams in NPL South Australia.

=== Western United ===
Yuel was signed by new club Western United ahead of the 2019–20 A-League. He left the club at the end of the 2019–20 season.

=== Newcastle Jets ===
Following 2.5 months without a club, including a trial period, Yuel joined Newcastle Jets on a two-year contract.

After not scoring for Western United in 9 appearances for the club, Yuel looked to prove himself in the A-League with Newcastle Jets. Yuel started strong, scoring 3 goals in 3 matches, however Yuel was kept to 1 goal in 8 matches as the Newcastle Jets set a club record, equalling 6 consecutive losses.

=== Aluminium Arak ===
On 7 August 2022, Yuel announced on his Instagram page that he had signed for Aluminium Arak, who play in the Persian Gulf League. During his time there, he became caught up in the Mahsa Amini protests for women's rights.

=== Umm Salal ===
He then had a few months with Umm Salal in Qatar, but the coach was sacked a few weeks after his arrival, and the foreign players gradually left.

=== Western Sydney Wanderers ===
Returning to Australia, Yuel joined A-League team Western Sydney Wanderers, where he played for a season in 2022–23.

=== FC Nasaf ===
In 2024 he played for Uzbekistan Champions League team FC Nasaf.

=== Al Murooj ===
Yuel then moved to Libya, where he joined Al Murooj.

=== Eastern District ===
On 25 October 2025, Yuel joined Hong Kong Premier League club Eastern District.

== International career ==
On 8 June 2021, it was announced that Yuel had accepted a call-up to the South Sudan national team. He made his debut on 31 January 2022, scoring the only goal in a 2–1 loss to Jordan.

== Career statistics ==
=== International goals ===
Scores and results list South Sudan's goal tally first.

No.	Date	Venue	Opponent	Score	Result	Competition
1.	31 January 2022	The Sevens Stadium, Dubai, United Arab Emirates	Jordan	1–1	1–2	Friendly
2.	14 June 2023	Suez Canal Stadium, Ismailia, Egypt	Gambia	1–1	2–3	2023 Africa Cup of Nations qualification
3.	10 September 2024	Juba Stadium, Juba, South Sudan	South Africa	2–2	2–3	2025 Africa Cup of Nations qualification

== Personal life ==
Yuel is planning to marry his fiancée, Jacki, who lives in Melbourne, in 2026.
