= Dominic Abui Pretino =

South Sudanese footballer

Personal information
- Full name: Dominic Abui Pretino
- Date of birth: 17 March 1990 (age 36)
- Place of birth: Nyala, Sudan
- Position: Forward

Team information
- Current team: Al-Merrikh SC (Bantio)
- Number: 10

Senior career*
Years	Team	Apps	(Gls)
2010–2014	Al-Nesoor SC		
2014–2020	Al Khartoum SC	90	(60)
2020–2023	Al Ahli SC (Khartoum)		
2023-	Al-Merrikh SC (Bantio)		

International career^{‡}
2013–	South Sudan	30	(4)
- * Club domestic league appearances and goals as of October 2015 ‡ National team caps and goals as of 12 October 2021

Dominic Abui Pretino (born 17 March 1990) is a South Sudanese footballer who plays as a forward.

== International career ==
=== International goals ===
Scores and results list South Sudan's goal tally first.

No	Date	Venue	Opponent	Score	Result	Competition
1.	8 October 2015	Juba Stadium, Juba, South Sudan	Mauritania	1–1	1–1	2018 FIFA World Cup qualification
2.	23 November 2015	Bahir Dar Stadium, Bahir Dar, Ethiopia	Djibouti	2–0	2–0	2015 CECAFA Cup
3.	28 March 2017	Juba Stadium, Juba, South Sudan	Djibouti	4–0	6–0	2019 Africa Cup of Nations qualification
