= Joseph Kuch =

South Sudanese footballer (born 2000)

Joseph Kuch Nyuar
Personal information
- Full name: Joseph Kuch Nyuar Atak
- Date of birth: 24 September 2000 (age 26)
- Place of birth: Akon, South Sudan
- Position: Forward

Senior career*
Years	Team	Apps	(Gls)
2014–2015	Real Black FC	26	(15)
2016–	Amarat United FC		

International career^{‡}
2021–	South Sudan	8	(4)
- * Club domestic league appearances and goals as of 21:26, 7 April 2021 (UTC) ‡ National team caps and goals as of 21:26, 7 April 2021 (UTC)

Joseph Kuch (born 24 September 2000) is a South Sudanese footballer who plays as a forward for Amarat United and the South Sudan national team.

== Club career ==
Kuch signed with Real Black FC of the South Sudan Football Championship in 2014. In his first and only season with the club he made 26 league appearances, scoring 15 goals. His performances attracted interest from Amarat United, also of the South Sudan Football Championship, and he joined the club the following season. In December 2020 Kuch was linked with a move to the Israeli Premier League. In July 2020, he was in talks to join Gor Mahia F.C. of the Kenyan Premier League but the deal did not materialize. Later that month he was also offered contracts from several clubs in Slovakia but air travel and visa restrictions caused by the COVID-19 pandemic made the move impossible. He departed Amarat United at the end of December 2020. At that time it was expected that he would sign for a club in East Asia. Kuch scored 48 combined league goals for the 2019 and 2020 seasons with the club.

== International career ==
Kuch represented South Sudan during 2019 Africa U-23 Cup of Nations qualification before the team was eliminated by Tunisia in the second round. He made his senior international debut on 22 April 2017 in a 2018 African Nations Championship qualification match against Somalia.

=== International goals ===
Scores and results list South Sudan's goal tally first.

No	Date	Venue	Opponent	Score	Result	Competition
1.	4 August 2019	Phillip Omondi Stadium, Kampala, Uganda	Burundi	1–0	1–2	2018 African Nations Championship qualification
2.	9 October 2019	Al-Merrikh Stadium, Omdurman, Sudan	Seychelles	2–1	2–1	2021 Africa Cup of Nations qualification
3.	13 October 2019	Stade Linité, Victoria, Seychelles	Seychelles	1–0	1–0	2021 Africa Cup of Nations qualification
4.	17 November 2019	Khartoum Stadium, Khartoum, Sudan	Burkina Faso	1–2	1–2	2021 Africa Cup of Nations qualification
Last updated 7 April 2021

=== International statistics ===
As of match played 17 November 2019

National team	Year	Apps	Goals
South Sudan	2017	1	0
South Sudan	2018	0	0
South Sudan	2019	7	4
South Sudan	2020	0	0
South Sudan	2021	1	0
Total		8	4
