= Al-Fallah Club =

Sudanese football club

Al-Falah SC
- Founded: 1948; 77 years ago
- Ground: Atbara Stadium
- Capacity: 15,000
- Owner: Hassan Abdelelah
- Chairman: Majdi Mansoor
- Manager: Muhamed Abdelnabi Mao
- League: Sudan Premier League
- Website: www.alfallahclubatbara.com

Al-Falah Cultural, Social and Sports Club (Arabic: الفلاح عطبرة) is a football club from Atbara (River Nile State), Sudan.

In the 2019–20 season, the club participated in the 2019–20 Sudan Premier League.
