= Roy Gulwak =

South Sudanese footballer

Personal information
- Date of birth: July 5, 1985 (age 41)
- Place of birth: Juba, Sudan (now South Sudan)
- Position: Goalkeeper

Team information
- Current team: FC Kator

Senior career*
Years	Team	Apps	(Gls)
2008	Al-Hilal Club (Omdurman)	?	(?)
2009–2011	Khartoum 3	?	(?)
2012–	FC Kator	?	(?)

International career
2009	Sudan	2	(0)
2012–	South Sudan	0	(0)
- * Club domestic league appearances and goals

Roy Gulwak is a goalkeeper for FC Kator. He is a member of the South Sudan national team. Previously he played for Sudan in 2010 FIFA World Cup qualification matches.
