= Athir Thomas =

South Sudanese footballer

Personal information
- Full name: Athir Thomas Magor Abdo Gaber
- Date of birth: 14 February 1987 (age 39)
- Place of birth: Juba, Sudan (now South Sudan)
- Position: Defender

Team information
- Current team: Al-Merrikh SC (Bantio)
- Number: 6

Senior career*
Years	Team	Apps	(Gls)
2008–2010	Al-Mourada SC	52	(3)
2011	Al-Hilal Club (Omdurman)	23	(3)
2012–2013	Al-Ahli Khartoum	60	(5)
2013–2016	Al-Hilal Club (Omdurman)	0	(0)
2017	Al Fahaheel	4	(0)
2017–2018	Al-Nahda		
2018–2020	Hay Al Wadi SC		
2020–2023	Al-Falah SC		
2023-	Al-Merrikh SC (Bantio)		

International career^{‡}
2010	Sudan	4	(0)
2012–	South Sudan	21	(1)
- * Club domestic league appearances and goals ‡ National team caps and goals as of 29 March 2017

Athir Thomas Magor Abdo Gaber (born 14 February 1987) is a South Sudanese footballer who plays as a defender.

== Career ==
He started his professional career 2008 with Al-Mourada SC. The defender joined in January 2011 to Al-Hilal Club (Omdurman) for Physical Education Omdurman. After one year with Al Hilal Omdurman, Ateir Tomes signed in May 2012 for Al-Ahli Khartoum.

== International career ==
He mas made at least one senior appearances for South Sudan against Kenya in the 2012 CECAFA Cup.

=== International goals ===
Scores and results list South Sudan's goal tally first.

No	Date	Venue	Opponent	Score	Result	Competition
1.	28 March 2017	Juba Stadium, Juba, South Sudan	Djibouti	5–0	6–0	2019 Africa Cup of Nations qualification
