= Juma Genaro =

South Sudanese footballer (born 1982)

Jumaa Jenaro
Personal information
- Full name: Juma Jenaro Awad
- Date of birth: 28 February 1982 (age 44)
- Place of birth: Omdurman, Khartoum State, Sudan
- Height: 1.78 m (5 ft 10 in)
- Position: Goalkeeper

Team information
- Current team: Al-Merrikh SC (Bentiu)
- Number: 1

Senior career*
Years	Team	Apps	(Gls)
2004–2007	Al-Nijoom SC (Ombada)	0	(0)
2007–2009	Al-Alamein SC (Khartoum)	0	(0)
2010	Al-Ahly Shendi	25	(0)
2010–2014	Al-Hilal Club	23	(0)
2015–2017	Kober SC (Bahri)	0	(0)
2015–2017	→ Al-Hilal Club (loan)	48	(0)
2018–2019	Al-Hilal Club	0	(0)
2019–2023	Hay Al-Wadi SC		
2023–	Al-Merrikh SC (Bentiu)	21	(0)

International career^{‡}
2012–	South Sudan	38	(0)
- * Club domestic league appearances and goals ‡ National team caps and goals as of 5 June 2024

Jumaa Jenaro Awad (born 28 February 1986) is a South Sudanese footballer who plays as a goalkeeper.

When South Sudan gained independence from Sudan, his club, Hay Al Wadi SC, had difficulty extending Genaro's contract as he was now considered a foreign player. As a result, he signed a contract with Al-Kober, and was seconded to Al-Hilal.

He made his debut for South Sudan against Uganda on 10 July 2012.

== Honours ==
=== Clubs ===
- Al-Hilal Club
- Sudan Premier League

Champions: (5) 2010, 2012, 2014, 2016, 2017

- Sudan Cup

Winners: (2) 2011, 2016
