= Tito Okello (footballer) =

South Sudanese footballer (born 1996)

Personal information
- Full name: Tito Odong Okello Lazarus
- Date of birth: 7 January 1996 (age 30)
- Place of birth: Gulu, Uganda
- Height: 1.81 m (5 ft 11 in)
- Position: Forward

Senior career*
Years	Team	Apps	(Gls)
2012–2013	SC Villa	4	(3)
2013–2014	BUL Jinja FC	12	(3)
2014–2017	African Lyon	10	(7)
2017–2018	KCCA FC	13	(5)
2018	Benfica de Macau	11	(9)
2018–2020	Vipers	32	(10)
2020–2022	Gor Mahia	47	(18)
2022–2023	Paykan	18	(1)
2023–2024	Kenya Police		
2024	PSM Makassar	10	(2)
2025	Abi al Ashar	8	(2)
2025–2026	Libyan Stadium SC	6	(4)

International career^{‡}
2020–	South Sudan	26	(6)
- * Club domestic league appearances and goals as of 11 January 2026 ‡ National team caps and goals as of 25 March 2025

Tito Odong Okello Lazarus (born 7 January 1996) is a footballer who plays as a forward. Born in Uganda, he plays for the South Sudan national team.

== International career ==
Okello made his debut for the South Sudan national football team on 10 October 2020 against Cameroon B.

== International goals ==
Scores and results list South Sudan's goal tally first.

No.	Date	Venue	Opponent	Score	Result	Competition
1.	16 November 2020	Nyayo National Stadium, Nairobi, Kenya	Uganda	1–0	1–0	2021 Africa Cup of Nations qualification
2.	23 March 2022	Borg El Arab Stadium, Borg El Arab, Egypt	Djibouti	1–0	4–2	2023 Africa Cup of Nations qualification
3.	23 March 2022	Borg El Arab Stadium, Borg El Arab, Egypt	Djibouti	3–1	4–2	2023 Africa Cup of Nations qualification
4.	23 March 2023	Stade Alphonse Massemba-Débat, Brazzaville, Congo	Congo	2–1	2–1	2023 Africa Cup of Nations qualification
5.	12 September 2023	Moi International Sports Centre, Nairobi, Kenya	Kenya	1–0	1–0	Friendly
6.	10 September 2024	Juba Stadium, Juba, South Sudan	South Africa	1–0	2–3	2025 Africa Cup of Nations qualification
