= James Moga =

South Sudanese footballer (born 1983)

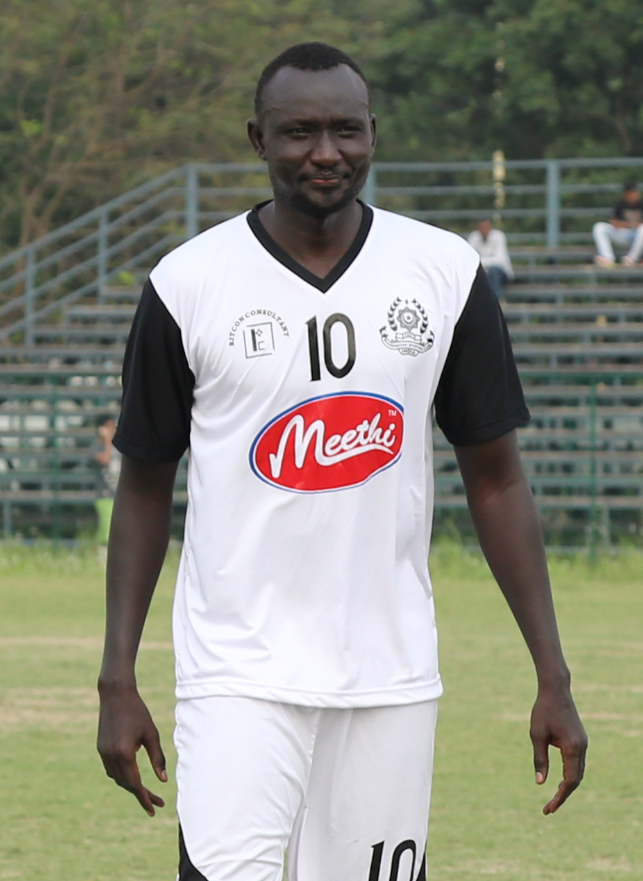
- Moga with Mohammedan in 2016

Personal information
- Full name: James Joseph Saeed Moga
- Date of birth: 14 June 1983 (age 43)
- Place of birth: Nimule, South Sudan
- Height: 1.91 m (6 ft 3 in)
- Position: Striker

Senior career*
Years	Team	Apps	(Gls)
1998–1999	Beit El Mal		
2000	Al-Hilal	10	(2)
2000–2002	Baniyas	46	(20)
2002	Al-Hilal	5	(0)
2002–2004	Baniyas	42	(17)
2004–2006	Al Rams	57	(33)
2006–2007	Al-Merrikh	30	(14)
2009–2010	Muscat	27	(24)
2010–2011	Muktijoddha Sangsad	22	(19)
2011	Sporting Clube de Goa	19	(16)
2012–2013	Pune	24	(16)
2013–2014	East Bengal	196	(17)
2015	Kator	3	(2)
2016	Mohammedan	8	(8)
2016–2017	Rangdajied United	12	(14)
2019	Brothers Union	11	(6)
Total		240	(133)

International career^{‡}
2000–2005	Sudan	26	(6)
2012–2017	South Sudan	18	(6)
- * Club domestic league appearances and goals as of 09:26, 18 July 2019 (UTC) ‡ National team caps and goals as of 22 July 2017

James Joseph Saeed Moga (born 14 June 1983) is a South Sudanese former professional footballer who played as a striker, who represented both Sudan and South Sudan internationally. He is South Sudan's all-time top goalscorer, with six goals in 18 appearances.

== Early life ==
James Joseph Saeed Moga was born on 14 June 1983 in the town of Nimule, South Sudan (then Sudan) immediately north of the South Sudan-Uganda border.

== Club career ==
=== Sporting Goa ===
He signed for Sporting Clube de Goa in the 2011–12 season of the I-League, he is one of the top scorers for Sporting Clube de Goa. Many other Indian clubs, including Pune FC, sought to sign him next season because of his scoring ability in almost every match. Later in August 2012, he left the club and was replaced by Cameroonian Bong Bertrand.

=== Pune ===
On 23 June 2012 it was officially confirmed that Moga had signed for Pune F.C. of the I-League on a one-year deal. On 15 December 2012, he struck twice to drub defending champions Dempo S.C. 5–1 at Nehru Stadium. On 22 December, he again struck a brace to beat Prayag United 2–1. He also scored one of league's fastest goal for the club, when he scored against United Sikkim in Gangtok in 14 seconds.

=== East Bengal ===
In June 2013, signed for Kolkata Giant East Bengal for one year. On 24 September 2013, Moga scored an important goal for East Bengal in 2013 AFC Cup Quarter final against Semen Padang FC in Indonesia, through which East Bengal qualified for semi final for the first time in their history.

=== Kator FC ===
In 2015, Moga signed for Kator FC which currently plays in the South Sudan Football Championship.

=== Mohammedan SC ===
In January 2016, Moga signed for Mohammedan which currently plays in the I-League 2nd Division.

=== Rangdajied United ===
In 2016, he moved to another I-League club Rangdajied United. He appeared with the club in Shillong Premier League.

=== Brothers Union ===
In May 2019 Moga joined Brothers Union of Bangladesh Premier League as a mid term transfer window signing.

== International career ==
He scored South Sudan's first goal against Tusker from Kenya in the match celebrating South Sudan's independence from Sudan, whose national team he had represented in the past, appearing in 2002 and 2006 World Cup qualifying matches. He scored his first international goal in the 2–2 draw with Uganda, South Sudan's first ever official international match.

== Career statistics ==
=== International goals for Sudan ===
Scores and results list Sudan's goal tally first.

No.	Date	Venue	Opponent	Score	Result	Competition
1.	18 June 2000	Stade de Omdurman, Omdurman, Sudan	Liberia	1–0	2–0	2002 FIFA World Cup qualification
2.	2 July 2000	Khartoum Stadium, Khartoum, Sudan	Eritrea	2–1	6–1	2002 Africa Cup of Nations qualification
3.	25 February 2001	Al-Merrikh Stadium, Omdurman, Sudan	Ghana	1–0	1–0	2002 FIFA World Cup qualification
4.	10 March 2001	National Stadium, Freetown, Sierra Leone	Sierra Leone	1–0	2–0	2002 FIFA World Cup qualification
5.	3 June 2001	Alexandria Stadium, Alexandria, Egypt	Egypt	1–3	2–3	2002 Africa Cup of Nations qualification

=== International goals for South Sudan ===
Scores and results list South Sudan's goal tally first.

No.	Date	Venue	Opponent	Score	Result	Competition
1.	10 July 2012	Juba Stadium, Juba, South Sudan	Uganda	2–2	2–2	Friendly
2.	27 November 2015	Bahir Dar Stadium, Bahir Dar, Ethiopia	Malawi	1–0	2–0	2015 CECAFA Cup
3.	28 March 2017	Juba Stadium, Juba, South Sudan	Djibouti	2–0	6–0	2019 Africa Cup of Nations qualification
4.	28 March 2017	Juba Stadium, Juba, South Sudan	Djibouti	3–0	6–0	2019 Africa Cup of Nations qualification
5.	22 April 2017	El Hadj Hassan Gouled Aptidon Stadium, Djibouti City, Djibouti	Somalia	1–0	2–1	2018 African Nations Championship qualification
6.	30 April 2017	Juba Stadium, Juba, South Sudan	Somalia	2–0	2–0	2018 African Nations Championship qualification

== Honours ==
Al-Merrikh

- Sudan Cup: 2006

Sporting Clube dé Goa

- I-League 2nd Division runner-up: 2010–11

Pune

- I-League runner-up: 2012–13

Mohammedan Sporting

- Sikkim Gold Cup: 2016
