= Richard Justin Lado =

South Sudanese footballer

Richard Gastin
Personal information
- Full name: Richard Justin Lado Samson
- Date of birth: 5 October 1979 (age 47)
- Place of birth: Khartoum, Sudan
- Height: 1.84 m (6 ft 1/2 in)
- Positions: Defensive midfielder; center back

Team information
- Current team: mangar

Senior career*
Years	Team	Apps	(Gls)
1996–1997	Al Sahafa SC (Khartoum)		
1998–2000	Al Khartoum SC		
2001–2004	Al-Hilal (Omdurman)	33	(11)
2004	Ismaily SC	12	(2)
2005–2008	Al-Hilal (Omdurman)	45	(15)
2009	Muscat Club		
2009	Al-Merrikh SC		
2010	Jazeerat Al-Feel SC		
2010–2013	Al Khartoum SC		
2013–2016	Al-Malakia FC		

International career^{‡}
1999–2008	Sudan	76	(7)
2011–2015	South Sudan	7	(2)
Medal record
Men's football
Representing Sudan
CECAFA Cup
Winner	2006 Ethiopia
- * Club domestic league appearances and goals as of 23 March 2007 ‡ National team caps and goals as of 24 June 2024

Richard Justin Lado (Arabic: ريشارد جاستن لادو, born 5 October 1979) is a former South Sudanese football defensive midfielder who last played for Al-Malakia FC. He was a member of the Sudan national football team. He scored the very first goal for South Sudan in an official international game.

== Honours ==
Sudan

- CECAFA Cup: 2006
