= Kator FC =

- Full name: Kator Football Club
- Nickname: The Green Knights/Loberas
- Founded: 1967; 59 years ago
- Ground: Juba Stadium, South Sudan
- Capacity: 7,000
- Chairman: Makiir Gai
- League: South Sudan Premier League
- 2025–26: 6th
Home colours	Away colours

Kator Football Club is a South Sudanese football club located in Juba, South Sudan which currently plays in the new established South Sudan Premier League.

The club is regarded as one of the most successful clubs in the South Sudan National League, alongside its rivals: Atlabara FC and Malakia FC. Kator FC were runners up to Al-Salam FC in the 2017 season. Kator FC lost to Al-Salam FC in 2011 South Sudan National Cup.

== Ownership ==
On 4 December 2016, Mr. Makiir Gai Thiep was appointed chairman in a bid to develop the club.

== Stadium ==
Currently, the team plays at the 12,000-capacity Juba Stadium.

== Current squad ==
Dida Santalino Juma Farouk Nimir kenyi Ndi Joseph Jule Emmanuel Philip Delfino Arike Patrick Thiep Jones Gai Kiir Gai Joseph Kalisto Jimmy Natali Kaka Ismail Koffi Guaya Emma
