= South Sudan national football team =

Men's association football team

South Sudan
- Nickname: Bright Stars
- Association: South Sudan Football Association (SSFA)
- Confederation: CAF (Africa)
- Sub-confederation: CECAFA (East & Central Africa)
- Head coach: Christian Nsengi-Biembe
- Captain: Juma Genaro
- Most caps: Peter Chol (46)
- Top scorer: James Moga; Tito Okello (6)
- Home stadium: Juba National Stadium
- FIFA code: SSD
First colours	Second colours

FIFA ranking
- Current: 170 (18 November 2026)
- Highest: 134 (November 2015)
- Lowest: 205 (September 2013)

First international
- South Sudan 2–2 Uganda (Juba, South Sudan; 10 July 2012)

Biggest win
- South Sudan 6–0 Djibouti (Juba, South Sudan; 28 March 2017)

Biggest defeat
- Mozambique 5–0 South Sudan (Maputo, Mozambique; 18 May 2014); South Sudan 0–5 Senegal (Juba, South Sudan; 10 October 2025) South Sudan 0–5 Egypt (Juba, South Sudan; 29 September 2026)

CECAFA Cup
- Appearances: 4 (first in 2012)
- Best result: Quarter-finals (2015)

The South Sudan national football team represents South Sudan in international football and is controlled by the South Sudan Football Association, the governing body for football in South Sudan.

== History ==
Zoran Đorđević was appointed on 25 May 2011 to oversee the national team. For their inaugural year the team was featured in a Storyville episode called Soccer Coach Zoran and his African Tigers. The national team's first international fixture was due to be against the Kenya national team on 10 July 2011 as part of the country's independence celebrations. However, in the event the opposition was provided by Tusker of the Kenyan Premier League, alongside the first international fixture of the national basketball team. The match was played at the Juba Stadium. South Sudan scored within ten minutes, but they later conceded three goals in a 3–1 defeat. South Sudan was officially admitted as a CAF member on 10 February 2012, at the 34th CAF Ordinary General Assembly hosted in Libreville, Gabon. South Sudan was admitted as a FIFA member on 25 May 2012 at the second session of the 62nd FIFA Congress hosted in Budapest, Hungary.

On 10 July 2012, South Sudan competed in its first full international match, a friendly against Uganda in Juba. The match ended in a 2–2 draw, with James Moga and Richard Justin Lado scoring for South Sudan. This match resulted in South Sudan entering the FIFA rankings at the start of August in 199th place.

The South Sudanese took part in their first ever international football tournament when they took part in the 2012 CECAFA Cup in Uganda. They were drawn in Group A alongside Ethiopia, Kenya, and hosts Uganda. The national team played their first match against Ethiopia, losing 1–0 through a Yonathan Kebede goal. In their next match, they lost 2–0 against Kenya. Their final match saw them suffer a 4–0 loss to Uganda.

South Sudan entered its first major international tournament in 2014, taking part in the 2015 Africa Cup of Nations qualification. As one of the four lowest ranked national teams in Africa, it entered in the preliminary stage and was scheduled to play against Eritrea, who withdrew, thus qualifying South Sudan for the first qualifying round. There, they played Mozambique over two legs, losing 5–0 at the Estádio do Zimpeto in Maputo, but hosting a goalless draw in the second leg which was held at the Khartoum Stadium in Sudan due to the South Sudanese Civil War.

On 5 September 2015, South Sudan achieved their first official victory, a 1–0 home win against Equatorial Guinea in 2017 Africa Cup of Nations qualification. One month later South Sudan played their first ever match in FIFA World Cup Qualification, a 1–1 draw at home to Mauritania. South Sudan would lose both return matches 4–0.

During 2019 AFCON qualifying the Bright Stars achieved their record win, defeating Djibouti 6–0 in Juba, however they lost all seven of their other matches meaning they remained among the lowest ranked teams in Africa.

In October 2019, in the 2021 AFCON preliminary round, South Sudan won an away game for the first time, beating Seychelles 1–0 in Victoria to secure a 3–1 aggregate victory. This sees the Bright Stars advance to the qualifying group stage for the third consecutive edition.

South Sudan is invited by FIFA to take part in FIFA Arab Cup qualification.

== Results and fixtures ==
The following is a list of match results in the last 12 months, as well as any future matches that have been scheduled.

Win Draw Loss Fixture

=== 2025 ===
25 November 2025 FIFA Arab Cup qualification	Syria	2–0	South Sudan	Doha, Qatar
19:00 UTC+3	Al-Hallaq 52'; Al Mawas 59'	Report		Stadium: Grand Hamad Stadium; Attendance: 7,294; Referee: Amin Omar (Egypt)

=== 2026 ===
26 March 2027 AFCON Qualifier	Djibouti	0–4	South Sudan	Juba, South Sudan
15:00 UTC+2		Report	Kuol 31'; Bangasi 49'; Maker 66'; Majak 81'	Stadium: Juba Stadium; Attendance: 0 (Behind closed doors); Referee: Tewodros Mitiku (Ethiopia)

29 March 2027 AFCON Qualifier	South Sudan	0–1	Djibouti	Juba, South Sudan
16:00 UTC+3		Report	Akinbinu 77'	Stadium: Juba Stadium; Attendance: 0 (Behind closed doors); Referee: Retṧelisitsoe Molise (Lesotho)

25 September 2027 AFCON qualification	Malawi	2–1	South Sudan	Lilongwe, Malawi
18:00 UTC+2	Adepoju 20'; Njaliwa 64'	Report	Dhata 48'	Stadium: Bingu National Stadium; Referee: Vincent Kaboré (Burkina Faso)

29 September 2027 AFCON qualification	South Sudan	0–5	Egypt	Juba, South Sudan
15:00 UTC+2		Report	Ziko 36'; Marmoush 49', 83'; Adel 75'; Abdelkarim 90+2'	Stadium: Juba Stadium; Referee: Ahmad Imtehaz Heeralall (Mauritius)

14 November 2027 AFCON qualification	Angola	2–0	South Sudan	Talatona, Angola
20:00 UTC+1	Banza 90+2'; Miro 90+8'	Report		Stadium: 11 November Stadium; Referee: Yannick Malala (Congo DR)

17 November 2027 AFCON qualification	South Sudan	0–1	Angola	Juba, South Sudan
14:00 UTC+2		Report	Miro 45+1'	Stadium: Juba Stadium; Referee: Boubou Traoré (Mali)

=== 2027 ===
24 March 2027 AFCON qualification	South Sudan	v	Malawi	TBD, South Sudan
TBD				Stadium: TBD

28 March 2027 AFCON qualification	Egypt	v	South Sudan	TBD, Egypt
TBD				Stadium: TBD

== Coaches ==
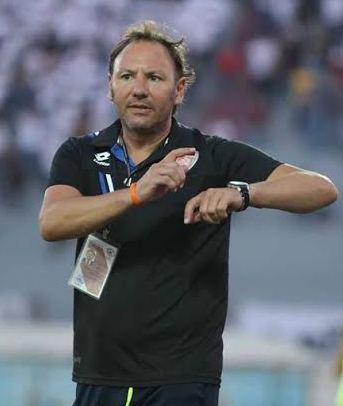
Stefano Cusin became the manager of the South Sudan national football team in 2011

Caretaker managers are listed in italics.

- (England) Stephen Constantine (2009–2011)
- (South Sudan) Malesh Soro (2011–2012)
- (South Sudan) Ismail Balanga (2012)
- (Serbia) Zoran Đorđević (2012–2013)
- (South Sudan) Ismail Balanga (2013–2014)
- (South Sudan) Salyi Lolaku Samuel (2014)
- (South Korea) Lee Sung-jea (2014–2015)
- (Uganda) Leo Adraa (2015–2016)
- (South Sudan) Joseph Malesh (2016)
- (South Sudan) Elya Wako (2017)
- (South Sudan) Bilal Felix Komoyangi (2017–2018)
- (Algeria) Ahcene Aït-Abdelmalek (2018)
- (South Sudan) Ramsey Sebit (2018)
- (Cameroon) Cyprian Besong Ashu (2019–2021)
- (Canada) Stefano Cusin (2021–2023)
- (South Sudan) Deng Aleer (2023)
- (France) Nicolas Dupuis (2023–2026)
- (Cameroon) Cyprian Besong Ashu (2026-)

== Players ==
=== Current squad ===
The following players were called up for the 2026 FIFA World Cup qualification – CAF Group B matches against DR Congo and Sudan on 21 and 25 March 2025.

Caps and goals correct as of 25 March 2025, after the match against Sudan.

No.	Pos.	Player	Date of birth (age)	Caps	Goals	Club
	GK	Majak Mawith	18 September 1999 (age 27)	23	0	(South Sudan Football Association) Jamus
	GK	Godwill Yugusuk	28 November 1999 (age 26)	0	0	(South Sudan Football Association) Kator
	DF	Rashid Toha	9 October 1997 (age 29)	22	1	(Football Kenya Federation) Kenya Police
	DF	Athir Thomas	14 February 1987 (age 39)	17	1	(South Sudan Football Association) Al Merreikh
	DF	Samuel Taban	29 October 2002 (age 24)	14	0	(South Sudan Football Association) Jamus
	DF	David Omot Sebit	28 October 1998 (age 28)	12	1	(South Sudan Football Association) Kator
	DF	Paul Puk Pal	12 February 2000 (age 26)	8	0	(South Sudan Football Association) Al Merreikh
	DF	Rashid Okocha	10 December 1993 (age 32)	4	0	(Federation of Uganda Football Associations) NEC
	DF	Bichiok	25 August 2007 (age 19)	0	0	(Football Kenya Federation) Nairobi United
	MF	Ivan Wani	12 December 1998 (age 27)	24	0	(South Sudan Football Association) Jamus
	MF	Joseph Malish Manase	27 July 2002 (age 24)	17	0	(South Sudan Football Association) Jamus
	MF	William Gama	14 December 2002 (age 23)	15	1	(South Sudan Football Association) Al-Malakia
	MF	Peter Chan	28 November 2002 (age 23)	2	0	(South Sudan Football Association) Olympic
	MF	Pap Chol	30 November 2002 (age 23)	2	0	(South Sudan Football Association) Kator
	MF	Mario Albano	23 April 2006 (age 20)	1	0	(South Sudan Football Association) Jamus
	MF	Nelson Victor Elia	30 September 2002 (age 24)	1	0	(South Sudan Football Association) Al Merreikh
	MF	Nhiak Agany	{{{age}}}	0	0	(South Sudan Football Association) Holy Family
	MF	Simon Kuoto'o	29 March 2000 (age 26)	0	0	(South Sudan Football Association) Jamus
	FW	Tito Okello	7 January 1996 (age 30)	24	6	(Libyan Football Federation) Abi al Ashar
	FW	Paul Jawa	15 July 2004 (age 22)	11	0	(French Football Federation) Fleury 91
	FW	Yohanna Paulino	6 October 1999 (age 27)	6	1	(South Sudan Football Association) Jamus
	FW	Lazarus Laku	29 May 2008 (age 18)	1	0	(Swedish Football Association) IFK Göteborg
	FW	Angufi Mudasiri	28 November 2007 (age 18)	1	0	(South Sudan Football Association) Koryom

=== Recent call-ups ===
Pos.	Player	Date of birth (age)	Caps	Goals	Club	Latest call-up

== Player records ==
As of 10 October 2025
Players in bold are still active with South Sudan.

=== Most appearances ===
Rank	Player	Caps	Goals	Career
1	**Peter Chol**	46	4	2015–present
2	**Juma Genaro**	38	0	2012–present
3	**Peter Maker**	33	0	2018–present
4	Dominic Abui Pretino	30	4	2013–2021
4	**Athir Thomas** (Note: Athir Thomas also appeared in 4 matches for Sudan)	30	1	2012–present
4	**Ivan Wani**	30	0	2020–present
7	Leon Uso Khamis	29	3	2012–2022
7	**Tito Okello**	29	6	2020–present
9	**Majak Mawith**	25	0	2019–present
9	**Rashid Toha**	25	1	2021–present

=== Top goalscorers ===
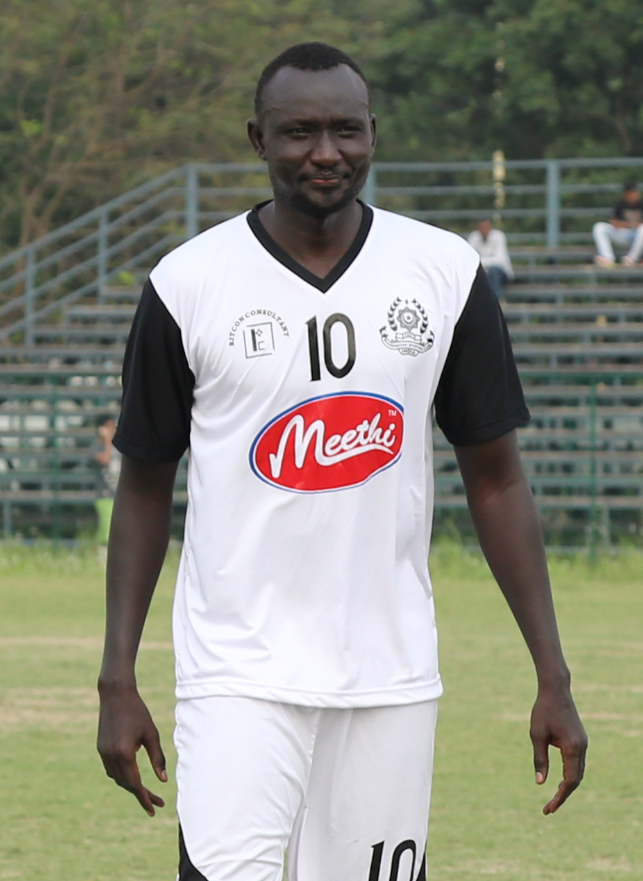
James Moga is South Sudan's joint top scorer with 6 goals.

Rank	Player	Goals	Caps	Ratio	Career
1	James Moga (Note: James Moga also appeared in 26 matches for Sudan, scoring 6 goals)	6	18	0.33	2012–2017
1	**Tito Okello**	6	29	0.21	2020–present
3	**Ebon Ezibon**	5	6	0.83	2024–present
4	Joseph Kuch Nyuar	4	8	0.5	2017–2019
4	Dominic Abui Pretino	4	30	0.13	2013–2021
4	**Peter Chol**	4	46	0.09	2015–present
7	Sebit Bruno	3	10	0.3	2015–2016
7	Atak Lual	3	13	0.23	2014–2018
7	**Valentino Yuel**	3	24	0.13	2022–present
7	Leon Uso Khamis	3	29	0.1	2012–2022

== Competitive record ==
=== FIFA World Cup ===
FIFA World Cup record									Qualification record					
Year	Round	Position	Pld	W	D*	L	GF	GA	Pld	W	D	L	GF	GA
1930 to 1938	Part of United Kingdom								Part of United Kingdom					
1950 to 2010	Part of Sudan								Part of Sudan					
(Brazil) 2014	Not a FIFA member								Not a FIFA member					
(Russia) 2018	Did not qualify								2	0	1	1	1	5
(Qatar) 2022	Did not qualify								2	0	1	1	1	2
(Canada) (Mexico) (United States) 2026	Did not qualify								10	0	5	5	3	19
(Morocco) (Portugal) (Spain) 2030	To be determined								To be determined					
(Saudi Arabia) 2034	To be determined								To be determined					
Total		0/2							14	0	7	7	5	26

=== Africa Cup of Nations ===
Africa Cup of Nations record									Qualification record					
Year	Round	Position	Pld	W	D	L	GF	GA	Pld	W	D	L	GF	GA
(Sudan) 1957	Part of Sudan								Part of Sudan					
(United Arab Republic) 1959	Part of Sudan								Part of Sudan					
(Ethiopia) 1962	Part of Sudan								Part of Sudan					
(Ghana) 1963	Part of Sudan								Part of Sudan					
(Tunisia) 1965	Part of Sudan								Part of Sudan					
(Ethiopia) 1968	Part of Sudan								Part of Sudan					
(Sudan) 1970	Part of Sudan								Part of Sudan					
(Egypt) 1974	Part of Sudan								Part of Sudan					
(Ethiopia) 1976	Part of Sudan								Part of Sudan					
(Ghana) 1978	Part of Sudan								Part of Sudan					
(Nigeria) 1980	Part of Sudan								Part of Sudan					
(Libya) 1982	Part of Sudan								Part of Sudan					
(Ivory Coast) 1984	Part of Sudan								Part of Sudan					
(Egypt) 1986	Part of Sudan								Part of Sudan					
(Morocco) 1988	Part of Sudan								Part of Sudan					
(Algeria) 1990	Part of Sudan								Part of Sudan					
(Senegal) 1992	Part of Sudan								Part of Sudan					
(Tunisia) 1994	Part of Sudan								Part of Sudan					
(South Africa) 1996	Part of Sudan								Part of Sudan					
(Burkina Faso) 1998	Part of Sudan								Part of Sudan					
(Ghana) (Nigeria) 2000	Part of Sudan								Part of Sudan					
(Mali) 2002	Part of Sudan								Part of Sudan					
(Tunisia) 2004	Part of Sudan								Part of Sudan					
(Egypt) 2006	Part of Sudan								Part of Sudan					
(Ghana) 2008	Part of Sudan								Part of Sudan					
(Angola) 2010	Part of Sudan								Part of Sudan					
(Equatorial Guinea) (Gabon) 2012	Did not enter								Did not enter					
(South Africa) 2013	Did not enter								Did not enter					
(Equatorial Guinea) 2015	Did not qualify								2	0	1	1	0	5
(Gabon) 2017	Did not qualify								6	1	0	5	3	15
(Egypt) 2019	Did not qualify								8	1	0	7	8	20
(Cameroon) 2021	Did not qualify								8	3	0	5	5	7
(Ivory Coast) 2023	Did not qualify								8	3	0	5	10	15
(Morocco) 2025	Did not qualify								8	1	2	5	7	13
(Kenya) (Tanzania) (Uganda) 2027	To be determined								To be determined					
2029	To be determined								To be determined					
Total		0/35	0	0	0	0	0	0	40	9	3	28	33	75

=== African Nations Championship ===
African Nations Championship record
Appearances: 0
Year	Round	Position	Pld	W	D	L	GF	GA
(Ivory Coast) 2009	Part of Sudan							
(Sudan) 2011	Part of Sudan							
(South Africa) 2014	Did not qualify							
(Rwanda) 2016	Did not qualify							
(Morocco) 2018	Did not qualify							
(Cameroon) 2020	Did not qualify							
(Algeria) 2022	Did not qualify							
(Kenya) (Tanzania) (Uganda) 2024	Did not qualify							
Total	–	0/8	–	–	–	–	–	–

=== CECAFA Cup ===
CECAFA Cup record
Appearances: 4
Year	Round	Position	Pld	W	D	L	GF	GA
(Uganda) 1973 to (Tanzania) 2010	Part of Sudan							
(Tanzania) 2011	Did not enter							
(Uganda) 2012	Group stage	11th	3	0	0	3	0	7
(Kenya) 2013	Group stage	10th	3	0	0	3	2	7
(Ethiopia) 2015	Quarter-finals	6th	4	2	2	0	4	0
(Kenya) 2017	Group stage	9th	3	0	1	2	1	8
(Uganda) 2019	Did not enter							
Total	Quarter-finals	4/40	13	2	3	8	7	22

=== FIFA Arab Cup ===
FIFA Arab Cup record									Qualification record					
Year	Round	Position	Pld	W	D	L	GF	GA	Pld	W	D	L	GF	GA
(Lebanon) 1963 to 2009^{1}	Part of Sudan								Part of Sudan					
(Saudi Arabia) 2012	Not invited								Not invited					
(Qatar) 2021	Did not qualify								0 (Note: The qualification match against Jordan was awarded to her due to a forfeit from South Sudan as multiple players and staff had positive COVID-19 test results upon their arrival in the qualifications hosts Qatar.)	0	0	1	0	3
(Qatar) 2025	Did not qualify								1	0	0	1	0	2
Total		0/3	0	0	0	0	0	0	1	0	0	2	0	5

^1 The 2009 edition was cancelled during qualification.

== Head-to-head record ==
Team	Pld	W	D	L	GF	GA	GD	WPCT
Benin	2	0	0	2	2	6	−4	0.00
Botswana	1	0	0	1	0	3	−3	0.00
Burkina Faso	2	0	0	2	1	3	−2	0.00
Burundi	3	0	1	2	2	8	−6	0.00
Congo	4	2	0	2	5	5	0	50.00
Djibouti	7	5	0	2	17	5	+12	71.43
DR Congo	2	0	0	2	1	5	−4	0.00
Egypt	2	0	0	2	0	8	−8	0.00
Equatorial Guinea	4	1	1	2	2	6	−4	25.00
Ethiopia	3	0	0	3	0	6	−6	0.00
Gabon	2	0	0	2	0	4	−4	0.00
Gambia	3	0	0	3	3	6	−3	0.00
Jordan	2	0	0	2	1	5	−4	0.00
Kenya	5	1	0	4	2	8	−6	20.00
Mali	6	0	0	6	1	18	−17	0.00
Malawi	4	1	0	3	3	4	−1	25.00
Mauritania	4	0	3	1	1	5	−4	0.00
Mozambique	2	0	1	1	0	5	−5	0.00
Senegal	2	0	0	2	0	9	−9	0.00
Seychelles	2	2	0	0	3	1	+2	100.00
Sierra Leone	1	0	1	0	1	1	0	0.00
South Africa	2	0	0	2	2	6	−4	0.00
Sudan	3	0	3	0	1	1	0	0.00
Syria	1	0	0	1	0	2	−2	0.00
Togo	1	0	1	0	0	0	0	0.00
Uganda	8	1	1	6	6	20	−14	12.50
Uzbekistan	1	0	0	1	0	3	−3	0.00
Zanzibar	1	0	0	1	1	2	−1	0.00
Total	80	13	12	55	55	155	−100	16.25

Source: Results

== Dual-internationals ==
The following South Sudanese international footballers have also played for Sudan national football team before the country's independence:

- James Moga – forward for Sudan. Played for them in 2002 FIFA World Cup qualification and 2006 FIFA World Cup qualification. Played 14 matches and scored six goals.
- Richard Justin Lado – Experienced defender in club football for Khartoum 3 and played for Sudan between 2008 and 2012.
- Athir Thomas – defender in Sudan before the country's partition.
- Roy Gulwak – Goalkeeper who represented Sudan in two 2010 FIFA World Cup qualification matches in 2009, conceding two goals.
- Khamis Martin – Played one international game for Sudan in 2010.
