= 2019 Africa Cup of Nations qualification =

Tournament details
- Dates: 22 March 2017 – 24 March 2019
- Teams: 51 (from 1 confederation)

Tournament statistics
- Matches played: 146
- Goals scored: 348 (2.38 per match)
- Top scorer(s): (Nigeria) Odion Ighalo (7 goals)

The 2019 Africa Cup of Nations qualification matches were organized by the Confederation of African Football (CAF) to decide the participating teams of the 2019 Africa Cup of Nations, the 32nd edition of the international men's football championship of Africa.

As per the decision of the CAF Executive Committee on 20 July 2017, a total of 24 teams qualified to play in the final tournament.

== Draw ==
A total of 51 teams entered the tournament, including Cameroon which would have qualified automatically for the final tournament as the hosts before their hosting rights were stripped. The draw for the qualifications stage took place on 12 January 2017, 19:30 UTC+1, in Libreville, Gabon.

=== Seeding ===
The teams were ranked using CAF's own system which calculated seeding based on each team's performance in the three most recent editions of the Africa Cup of Nations final tournaments, the three most recent editions of the Africa Cup of Nations qualifying campaigns, and the 2014 FIFA World Cup final tournament and qualifying campaign.

The teams ranked 1–45 (Pots 1–4) directly entered the group stage, while the teams ranked 46–51 (Pot 5) entered the preliminary round.

Pot	Rank	Team	Tournaments and weighting factor								Total
Pot	Rank	Team	2017 AFCON Q	2015 AFCON	2015 AFCON Q	2013 AFCON	2013 AFCON Q	2012 AFCON	2014 FWC	2014 FWC Q	Total
Pot	Rank	Team	× 2	× 3	× 1	× 2	× 0.5	× 1	× 2	× 1	Total
Pot 1	1	Ivory Coast	8	24	3	6	1.5	6	8	7	63.5
Pot 1	2	Ghana	8	18	4	8	1.5	4	6	7	56.5
Pot 1	3	Nigeria	6		2	16	1.5		12	7	44.5
Pot 1	4	Algeria	8	9	4	2	1.5		12	7	43.5
Pot 1	5	Tunisia	8	9	4	4	1.5	3		5	34.5
Pot 1	6	Mali	8	6	3	8	1.5	4		3	33.5
Pot 1	7	Burkina Faso	8	3	3	12	1.5	1		5	33.5
Pot 1	8	DR Congo	8	12	2	4	1.5			2	29.5
Pot 1	9	Cameroon	8	3	4		1		6	7	29
Pot 1	10	Zambia	4	3	3	4	1.5	8		3	26.5
Pot 1	11	Cape Verde	6	6	4	6	1.5			3	26.5
Pot 1	12	Senegal	8	6	3o		1	1		5	24
Pot 2	13	Gabon	6	6	4		1	3		2	22
Pot 2	14	Guinea	4	9	3		1	2		3	22
Pot 2	15	Congo	6	9	3		0.5			3	21.5
Pot 2	16	Equatorial Guinea	4	12			1	3		1	21
Pot 2	17	South Africa	4	3	4	6				3	20
Pot 2	18	Morocco	8			4	1.5	2		3	18.5
Pot 2	19	Egypt	8		2		0.5			5	15.5
Pot 2	20	Ethiopia	6		1	2	1.5			5	15.5
Pot 2	21	Togo	6		1	6	1.5			1	15.5
Pot 2	22	Angola	4		2	2	1.5	2		2	13.5
Pot 2	23	Uganda	6		2		1			3	12
Pot 2	24	Mozambique	6		2		1			2	11
Pot 3	25	Zimbabwe	8				1			1	10
Pot 3	26	Libya	4				1	2		3	10
Pot 3	27	Botswana	4		1		1	1		2	9
Pot 3	28	Niger	2		1	2	1.5	1		1	8.5
Pot 3	29	Benin	6				0.5			2	8.5
Pot 3	30	Guinea-Bissau	8				0.5				8.5
Pot 3	31	Malawi	2		2		1			3	8
Pot 3	32	Sudan	2		1		1	3		1	8
Pot 3	33	Sierra Leone (Note: Sierra Leone went into the qualifying period, but were disqualified due to a suspension by CAF.)	4		1		1			2	8
Pot 3	34	Central African Republic	6				1			1	8
Pot 3	35	Tanzania	4				0.5			2	6.5
Pot 3	36	Burundi	6				0.5				6.5
Pot 4	37	Mauritania	6								6
Pot 4	38	Eswatini	6								6
Pot 4	39	Liberia	4				1			1	6
Pot 4	40	Namibia	4				0.5			1	5.5
Pot 4	41	Rwanda	4				0.5			1	5.5
Pot 4	42	Lesotho	2		1					2	5
Pot 4	43	Kenya	2				0.5			2	4.5
Pot 4	44	Seychelles	4				0.5				4.5
Pot 4	45	Gambia	2				0.5			1	3.5
Pot 5	46	Madagascar	2				0.5				2.5
Pot 5	47	São Tomé and Príncipe	2				0.5				2.5
Pot 5	48	South Sudan	2								2
Pot 5	49	Comoros	2								2
Pot 5	50	Djibouti	2								2
Pot 5	51	Mauritius	2								2
No Pot	52	Chad (Note: Chad were banned from entering by CAF due to their withdrawal from the 2017 Africa Cup of Nations qualification tournament.)					0.5				0.5
No Pot	53	Eritrea (Note: Eritrea and Somalia did not enter.)									0
No Pot	54	Somalia									0

=== Procedure ===
The nine teams from Pot 4 were drawn in Groups D to L, while the twelve teams from each of the Pots 3, 2 and 1 were drawn in Groups A to L. Then, the six teams from Pot 5 were drawn into three pairings, which would play in the preliminary round. The three winners would advance to Groups A, B and C of the group stage.

== Schedule ==
The schedule of the qualifying tournament was as follows.

Round	Matchday	Dates		Matches
Round	Matchday	Original dates	Revised dates	Matches
Preliminary round	First leg	20–28 March 2017		Team 1 vs. Team 2
Preliminary round	Second leg	20–28 March 2017		Team 2 vs. Team 1
Group stage	Matchday 1	5–13 June 2017		Team 1 vs. Team 2; Team 3 vs. Team 4
Group stage	Matchday 2	19–27 March 2018	3–11 September 2018	Team 2 vs. Team 3; Team 4 vs. Team 1
Group stage	Matchday 3	3–11 September 2018	8–16 October 2018	Team 1 vs. Team 3; Team 2 vs. Team 4
Group stage	Matchday 4	3–11 September 2018	8–16 October 2018	Team 3 vs. Team 1; Team 4 vs. Team 2
Group stage	Matchday 5	8–16 October 2018	12–20 November 2018	Team 2 vs. Team 1; Team 4 vs. Team 3
Group stage	Matchday 6	5–13 November 2018	18–26 March 2019	Team 3 vs. Team 2; Team 1 vs. Team 4

Matchday 2 was postponed at the request of the 2018 FIFA World Cup qualified teams so that they could play friendly matches in March 2018 to prepare for the World Cup.

== Preliminary round ==
The six teams were drawn into three ties, played in home-and-away two-legged format. The three winners advanced to the group stage to join the 45 teams which entered directly.

Team 1	Agg.	Team 2	1st leg	2nd leg
São Tomé and Príncipe	2–4	Madagascar	0–1	2–3
Comoros	3–1	Mauritius	2–0	1–1
Djibouti	2–6	South Sudan	2–0	0–6

== Group stage ==
The 48 teams were drawn into 12 groups of four teams (from Group A to Group L). They consisted of the 45 teams which entered directly, plus the three winners of the preliminary round whose identity was not known at the time of the draw.

The original host Cameroon was drawn into Group B. With the team guaranteed a spot in the finals regardless of its ranking in the group, its matches would have counted in determining the qualification of the other teams.

All group winners plus three best runners-up would have qualified for the finals. From Group B, if Cameroon had finished first or second, the other team placed in the top 2 would have qualified too and no other team would have been eligible to qualify, while if Cameroon had finished third or fourth, the group winner would have qualified and the runner-up would have been eligible to qualify as one of the three best runners-up.

On 20 July 2017, when the first round of the qualifying group stage had already been played, the final tournament was expanded from 16 to 24 teams. Under the new format, the best-placed team other than Cameroon would have qualified from Group B, while the group winners and runners-up would have qualified from all other groups.

On 30 November 2018 Cameroon was stripped of the hosting rights. The team lost its automatic spot for the finals but still could qualify through the qualification process, which it eventually did. On 8 January 2019 Egypt was named as the replacement host. As at that point Egypt had already been assured of a top 2 finish in Group J, the winners and runners-up from all qualification groups would now qualify for the final tournament.

Tiebreakers

The teams were ranked according to points (3 points for a win, 1 point for a draw, 0 points for a loss). If tied on points, tiebreakers were applied in the following order (Regulations Article 14):

1. Points in head-to-head matches among tied teams;
2. Goal difference in head-to-head matches among tied teams;
3. Goals scored in head-to-head matches among tied teams;
4. Away goals scored in head-to-head matches among tied teams;
5. If more than two teams were tied, and after applying all head-to-head criteria above, a subset of teams were still tied, all head-to-head criteria above were reapplied exclusively to this subset of teams;
6. Goal difference in all group matches;
7. Goals scored in all group matches;
8. Away goals scored in all group matches;
9. Drawing of lots.
The 12 group winners and runners-up qualified for the final tournament.

=== Group A ===
Pos	Team	Pld	W	D	L	GF	GA	GD	Pts	Qualification	Senegal national football team	Madagascar national football team	Equatorial Guinea national football team	Sudan national football team
1	Senegal	6	5	1	0	12	2	+10	16	Final tournament	—	2–0	3–0	3–0
2	Madagascar	6	3	1	2	8	8	0	10	Final tournament	2–2	—	1–0	1–3
3	Equatorial Guinea	6	2	0	4	5	7	−2	6		0–1	0–1	—	1–0
4	Sudan	6	1	0	5	5	13	−8	3		0–1	1–3	1–4	—

Source: CAF

=== Group B ===
Pos	Team	Pld	W	D	L	GF	GA	GD	Pts	Qualification	Morocco national football team	Cameroon national football team	Malawi national football team	Comoros national football team
1	Morocco	6	3	2	1	8	3	+5	11 (Note: Head-to-head goal difference: Morocco 1, Cameroon –1.)	Final tournament	—	2–0	3–0	1–0
2	Cameroon	6	3	2	1	6	3	+3	11	Final tournament	1–0	—	1–0	3–0
3	Malawi	6	1	2	3	2	6	−4	5 (Note: Head-to-head away goals scored: Malawi 1, Comoros 0.)		0–0	0–0	—	1–0
4	Comoros	6	1	2	3	5	9	−4	5		2–2	1–1	2–1	—

Source: CAF

=== Group C ===
Pos	Team	Pld	W	D	L	GF	GA	GD	Pts	Qualification	Mali national football team	Burundi national football team	Gabon national football team	South Sudan national football team
1	Mali	6	4	2	0	10	2	+8	14	Final tournament	—	0–0	2–1	3–0
2	Burundi	6	2	4	0	11	5	+6	10	Final tournament	1–1	—	1–1	3–0
3	Gabon	6	2	2	2	7	5	+2	8		0–1	1–1	—	3–0
4	South Sudan	6	0	0	6	2	18	−16	0		0–3	2–5	0–1	—

Source: CAF

=== Group D ===
Pos	Team	Pld	W	D	L	GF	GA	GD	Pts	Qualification	Algeria national football team	Benin national football team	Gambia national football team	Togo national football team
1	Algeria	6	3	2	1	9	4	+5	11	Final tournament	—	2–0	1–1	1–0
2	Benin	6	3	1	2	5	6	−1	10	Final tournament	1–0	—	1–0	2–1
3	Gambia	6	1	3	2	6	6	0	6		1–1	3–1	—	0–1
4	Togo	6	1	2	3	4	8	−4	5		1–4	0–0	1–1	—

Source: CAF

=== Group E ===
Pos	Team	Pld	W	D	L	GF	GA	GD	Pts	Qualification	Nigeria national football team	South Africa national soccer team	Libya national football team	Seychelles national football team
1	Nigeria	6	4	1	1	14	6	+8	13	Final tournament	—	0–2	4–0	3–1
2	South Africa	6	3	3	0	11	2	+9	12	Final tournament	1–1	—	0–0	6–0
3	Libya	6	2	1	3	16	11	+5	7		2–3	1–2	—	5–1
4	Seychelles	6	0	1	5	3	25	−22	1		0–3	0–0	1–8	—

Source: CAF

=== Group F ===
Pos	Team	Pld	W	D	L	GF	GA	GD	Pts	Qualification	Ghana national football team	Kenya national football team	Ethiopia national football team	Sierra Leone national football team
1	Ghana	4	3	0	1	8	1	+7	9	Final tournament	—	1–0	5–0	Canc.
2	Kenya	4	2	1	1	4	1	+3	7	Final tournament	1–0	—	3–0	Canc.
3	Ethiopia	4	0	1	3	0	10	−10	1		0–2	0–0	—	~~1–0~~
4	Sierra Leone	0	0	0	0	0	0	0	0	Disqualified (Note: On 30 November 2018, the CAF decided to disqualify Sierra Leone from the qualifiers, and all their matches were annulled, due to FIFA's suspension of the Sierra Leone Football Association on 5 October 2018.)	Canc.	~~2–1~~	Canc.	—

Source: CAF

=== Group G ===
Pos	Team	Pld	W	D	L	GF	GA	GD	Pts	Qualification	Zimbabwe national football team	DR Congo national football team	Liberia national football team	Congo national football team
1	Zimbabwe	6	3	2	1	9	4	+5	11	Final tournament	—	1–1	3–0	2–0
2	DR Congo	6	2	3	1	8	6	+2	9	Final tournament	1–2	—	1–0	3–1
3	Liberia	6	2	1	3	5	9	−4	7		1–0	1–1	—	2–1
4	Congo	6	1	2	3	7	10	−3	5		1–1	1–1	3–1	—

Source: CAF

=== Group H ===
Pos	Team	Pld	W	D	L	GF	GA	GD	Pts	Qualification	Guinea national football team	Ivory Coast national football team	Central African Republic national football team	Rwanda national football team
1	Guinea	6	3	3	0	8	4	+4	12	Final tournament	—	1–1	1–0	2–0
2	Ivory Coast	6	3	2	1	12	5	+7	11	Final tournament	2–3	—	4–0	3–0
3	Central African Republic	6	1	3	2	4	8	−4	6		0–0	0–0	—	2–1
4	Rwanda	6	0	2	4	5	12	−7	2		1–1	1–2	2–2	—

Source: CAF

=== Group I ===
Pos	Team	Pld	W	D	L	GF	GA	GD	Pts	Qualification	Angola national football team	Mauritania national football team	Burkina Faso national football team	Botswana national football team
1	Angola	6	4	0	2	9	6	+3	12 (Note: Head-to-head goal difference: Angola 2, Mauritania –2.)	Final tournament	—	4–1	2–1	1–0
2	Mauritania	6	4	0	2	7	6	+1	12	Final tournament	1–0	—	2–0	2–1
3	Burkina Faso	6	3	1	2	8	5	+3	10		3–1	1–0	—	3–0
4	Botswana	6	0	1	5	1	8	−7	1		0–1	0–1	0–0	—

Source: CAF'

=== Group J ===
Pos	Team	Pld	W	D	L	GF	GA	GD	Pts	Qualification	Tunisia national football team	Egypt national football team	Niger national football team	Eswatini national football team
1	Tunisia	6	5	0	1	12	4	+8	15	Final tournament	—	1–0	1–0	4–0
2	Egypt (Note: Egypt were named as hosts of the final tournament replacing Cameroon on 8 January 2019. At that time, they had already clinched a top two place in Group J and assured of qualification to the final tournament.)	6	4	1	1	16	5	+11	13	Final tournament	3–2	—	6–0	4–1
3	Niger	6	1	2	3	4	11	−7	5		1–2	1–1	—	0–0
4	Eswatini (Note: The official name of Swaziland was changed to Eswatini in 2018 after they had played their first qualifying match, and since then both FIFA and CAF have used the name Eswatini for official use.)	6	0	1	5	2	14	−12	1		0–2	0–2	1–2	—

Source: CAF

=== Group K ===
Pos	Team	Pld	W	D	L	GF	GA	GD	Pts	Qualification	Guinea-Bissau national football team	Namibia national football team	Mozambique national football team	Zambia national football team
1	Guinea-Bissau	6	2	3	1	8	7	+1	9	Final tournament	—	1–0	2–2	2–1
2	Namibia	6	2	2	2	5	7	−2	8 (Note: Head-to-head points: Namibia 6, Mozambique 0.)	Final tournament	0–0	—	1–0	1–1
3	Mozambique	6	2	2	2	7	7	0	8		2–2	1–2	—	1–0
4	Zambia	6	2	1	3	8	7	+1	7		2–1	4–1	0–1	—

Source: CAF

=== Group L ===
Pos	Team	Pld	W	D	L	GF	GA	GD	Pts	Qualification	Uganda national football team	Tanzania national football team	Lesotho national football team	Cape Verde national football team
1	Uganda	6	4	1	1	7	3	+4	13	Final tournament	—	0–0	3–0	1–0
2	Tanzania	6	2	2	2	6	5	+1	8	Final tournament	3–0	—	1–1	2–0
3	Lesotho	6	1	3	2	3	7	−4	6		0–2	1–0	—	1–1
4	Cape Verde	6	1	2	3	4	5	−1	5		0–1	3–0	0–0	—

Source: CAF

== Qualified teams ==
Qualified Failed to qualify Withdrew, disqualified or did not enter Not part of CAF

The following 24 teams qualified for the final tournament.

Team	Qualified as	Qualified on	Previous appearances in Africa Cup of Nations^{1}
Senegal	Group A winners	16 October 2018	14 (1965, 1968, 1986, 1990, 1992, 1994, 2000, 2002, 2004, 2006, 2008, 2012, 2015, 2017)
Madagascar	Group A runners-up	16 October 2018	debut
Morocco	Group B winners	17 November 2018	16 (1972, **1976**, 1978, 1980, 1986, 1988, 1992, 1998, 2000, 2002, 2004, 2006, 2008, 2012, 2013, 2017)
Cameroon	Group B runners-up	23 March 2019	18 (1970, 1972, 1982, **1984**, 1986, **1988**, 1990, 1992, 1996, 1998, **2000**, **2002**, 2004, 2006, 2008, 2010, 2015, **2017**)
Mali	Group C winners	17 November 2018	10 (1972, 1994, 2002, 2004, 2008, 2010, 2012, 2013, 2015, 2017)
Burundi	Group C runners-up	23 March 2019	debut
Algeria	Group D winners	18 November 2018	17 (1968, 1980, 1982, 1984, 1986, 1988, **1990**, 1992, 1996, 1998, 2000, 2002, 2004, 2010, 2013, 2015, 2017)
Benin	Group D runners-up	24 March 2019	3 (2004, 2008, 2010)
Nigeria	Group E winners	17 November 2018	17 (1963, 1976, 1978, **1980**, 1982, 1984, 1988, 1990, 1992, **1994**, 2000, 2002, 2004, 2006, 2008, 2010, **2013**)
South Africa	Group E runners-up	24 March 2019	9 (**1996**, 1998, 2000, 2002, 2004, 2006, 2008, 2013, 2015)
Ghana	Group F winners	30 November 2018	21 (**1963**, **1965**, 1968, 1970, **1978**, 1980, **1982**, 1984, 1992, 1994, 1996, 1998, 2000, 2002, 2006, 2008, 2010, 2012, 2013, 2015, 2017)
Kenya	Group F runners-up	30 November 2018	5 (1972, 1988, 1990, 1992, 2004)
Zimbabwe	Group G winners	24 March 2019	3 (2004, 2006, 2017)
DR Congo	Group G runners-up	24 March 2019	18 (1965, **1968**, 1970, 1972, **1974**, 1976, 1988, 1992, 1994, 1996, 1998, 2000, 2002, 2004, 2006, 2013, 2015, 2017)
Guinea	Group H winners	18 November 2018	11 (1970, 1974, 1976, 1980, 1994, 1998, 2004, 2006, 2008, 2012, 2015)
Ivory Coast	Group H runners-up	18 November 2018	22 (1965, 1968, 1970, 1974, 1980, 1984, 1986, 1988, 1990, **1992**, 1994, 1996, 1998, 2000, 2002, 2006, 2008, 2010, 2012, 2013, **2015**, 2017)
Angola	Group I winners	22 March 2019	7 (1996, 1998, 2006, 2008, 2010, 2012, 2013)
Mauritania	Group I runners-up	18 November 2018	debut
Tunisia	Group J winners	16 October 2018	18 (1962, 1963, 1965, 1978, 1982, 1994, 1996, 1998, 2000, 2002, **2004**, 2006, 2008, 2010, 2012, 2013, 2015, 2017)
Egypt	Group J runners-up / Hosts	16 October 2018	23 (**1957**, **1959**, 1962, 1963, 1970, 1974, 1976, 1980, 1984, **1986**, 1988, 1990, 1992, 1994, 1996, **1998**, 2000, 2002, 2004, **2006**, **2008**, **2010**, 2017)
Guinea-Bissau	Group K winners	23 March 2019	1 (2017)
Namibia	Group K runners-up	23 March 2019	2 (1998, 2008)
Uganda	Group L winners	17 November 2018	6 (1962, 1968, 1974, 1976, 1978, 2017)
Tanzania	Group L runners-up	24 March 2019	1 (1980)

^{1} Bold indicates champion for that year. Italic indicates host for that year.

== Goalscorers ==
There were 348 goals scored in 146 matches, for an average of 2.38 goals per match.

7 goals

- (Nigeria) Odion Ighalo

6 goals

- (Burundi) Fiston Abdul Razak

5 goals

- (Comoros) El Fardou Ben Nabouhane
- (Zimbabwe) Knowledge Musona

4 goals

- (Angola) Mateus Galiano
- (Egypt) Mohamed Salah
- (Libya) Anis Saltou
- (South Africa) Percy Tau
- (Tunisia) Naim Sliti

3 goals

- (Algeria) Baghdad Bounedjah
- (Angola) Gelson
- (Burundi) Cédric Amissi
- (Republic of the Congo) Thievy Bifouma
- (Democratic Republic of the Congo) Cédric Bakambu
- (Egypt) Trézéguet
- (Equatorial Guinea) Emilio Nsue
- (Guinea-Bissau) Frédéric Mendy
- (Liberia) William Jebor
- (Libya) Ahmad Benali
- (Madagascar) Carolus Andriamatsinoro
- (Madagascar) Faneva Imà Andriatsima
- (Madagascar) Paulin Voavy
- (Mauritania) Ismaël Diakité
- (Morocco) Hakim Ziyech
- (Rwanda) Jacques Tuyisenge
- (Senegal) M'Baye Niang
- (Uganda) Farouk Miya
- (Zambia) Justin Shonga
- (Zimbabwe) Khama Billiat

2 goals

- (Algeria) Riyad Mahrez
- (Benin) Steve Mounié
- (Burkina Faso) Aristide Bancé
- (Burkina Faso) Bertrand Traoré
- (Cameroon) Eric Maxim Choupo-Moting
- (Cape Verde) Ricardo Gomes
- (Republic of the Congo) Prince Ibara
- (Egypt) Marwan Mohsen
- (Gabon) Denis Bouanga
- (The Gambia) Assan Ceesay
- (Ghana) Jordan Ayew
- (Ghana) Raphael Dwamena
- (Guinea) François Kamano
- (Guinea-Bissau) Piqueti
- (Ivory Coast) Eric Bailly
- (Ivory Coast) Maxwel Cornet
- (Ivory Coast) Seydou Doumbia
- (Ivory Coast) Jonathan Kodjia
- (Kenya) Michael Olunga
- (Libya) Hamdou Elhouni
- (Libya) Mohamed Zubya
- (Mali) Kalifa Coulibaly
- (Mali) Adama Traoré
- (Morocco) Youssef En-Nesyri
- (Mozambique) Stanley Ratifo
- (Mozambique) Reginaldo
- (Namibia) Peter Shalulile
- (Niger) Victorien Adebayor
- (Nigeria) Ahmed Musa
- (Senegal) Idrissa Gueye
- (Senegal) Moussa Sow
- (South Africa) Lebo Mothiba
- (South Sudan) James Moga
- (Tanzania) Simon Msuva
- (Tanzania) Mbwana Samatta
- (Tunisia) Firas Chaouat
- (Tunisia) Taha Yassine Khenissi
- (Tunisia) Yassine Meriah
- (Uganda) Emmanuel Okwi
- (Zambia) Augustine Mulenga

1 goal

- (Algeria) Mehdi Abeid
- (Algeria) Youcef Attal
- (Algeria) Ramy Bensebaini
- (Algeria) Sofiane Hanni
- (Angola) Djalma
- (Angola) Wilson Eduardo
- (Benin) Sessi D'Almeida
- (Benin) David Djigla
- (Benin) Stéphane Sessègnon
- (Botswana) Keeagile Kobe
- (Burkina Faso) Issoufou Dayo
- (Burkina Faso) Banou Diawara
- (Burkina Faso) Jonathan Pitroipa
- (Burkina Faso) Abdou Razack Traoré
- (Burundi) Saido Berahino
- (Burundi) Gaël Duhayindavyi
- (Cameroon) Vincent Aboubakar
- (Cameroon) Stéphane Bahoken
- (Cameroon) Christian Bassogog
- (Cameroon) Clinton N'Jie
- (Cape Verde) Djaniny
- (Cape Verde) Stopira
- (Central African Republic) Junior Gourrier
- (Central African Republic) Habib Habibou
- (Central African Republic) Salif Kéïta
- (Central African Republic) Geoffrey Kondogbia
- (Comoros) Chaker Alhadhur
- (Comoros) Nasser Chamed
- (Comoros) Benjaloud Youssouf
- (Republic of the Congo) Merveil Ndockyt
- (Republic of the Congo) Prince Oniangué
- (Djibouti) Mohamed Salem Breik
- (Djibouti) Abdi Idleh Hamza
- (Democratic Republic of the Congo) Yannick Bolasie
- (Democratic Republic of the Congo) Kabongo Kasongo
- (Democratic Republic of the Congo) Chancel Mbemba
- (Democratic Republic of the Congo) Elia Meschak
- (Egypt) Ayman Ashraf
- (Egypt) Ahmed Elmohamady
- (Egypt) Baher El Mohamady
- (Egypt) Mohamed Elneny
- (Egypt) Ahmed Hegazi
- (Egypt) Salah Mohsen
- (Egypt) Amr Warda
- (Equatorial Guinea) Pablo Ganet
- (Equatorial Guinea) Pedro Obiang
- (Eswatini) Sibonginkosi Gamedze
- (Eswatini) Sifiso Nkambule
- (Ethiopia) Getaneh Kebede
- (Gabon) Aaron Appindangoyé
- (Gabon) Pierre-Emerick Aubameyang
- (Gabon) André Biyogo Poko
- (The Gambia) Mamadou Danso
- (The Gambia) Ablie Jallow
- (The Gambia) Lamin Jallow
- (The Gambia) Bubacarr Jobe
- (Ghana) John Boye
- (Ghana) Asamoah Gyan
- (Ghana) Ebenezer Ofori
- (Ghana) Jeffrey Schlupp
- (Guinea) Ibrahima Cissé
- (Guinea) Sadio Diallo
- (Guinea) José Kanté
- (Guinea) Naby Keïta
- (Guinea) Seydouba Soumah
- (Guinea) Mohamed Yattara
- (Guinea-Bissau) Carlos Embaló
- (Guinea-Bissau) Edigeison Gomes
- (Guinea-Bissau) Toni Silva
- (Ivory Coast) Cheick Doukouré
- (Ivory Coast) Max Gradel
- (Ivory Coast) Nicolas Pépé
- (Ivory Coast) Jean Michaël Seri
- (Kenya) Eric Johana Omondi
- (Kenya) Victor Wanyama
- (Lesotho) Nkau Lerotholi
- (Lesotho) Sera Motebang
- (Lesotho) Thapelo Tale
- (Liberia) Teah Dennis Jr.
- (Liberia) Sam Johnson
- (Libya) Rabi Al-Shadi
- (Libya) Muaid Ellafi
- (Libya) Salem Roma
- (Libya) Khaled Majdi
- (Libya) Motasem Sabbou
- (Madagascar) Njiva Rakotoharimalala
- (Malawi) Gerald Phiri Jr.
- (Malawi) Patrick Phiri
- (Mali) Yves Bissouma
- (Mali) Salif Coulibaly
- (Mali) Moussa Djenepo
- (Mali) Moussa Doumbia
- (Mali) Mamadou Fofana
- (Mali) Moussa Marega
- (Mauritania) Adama Ba
- (Mauritania) Khassa Camara
- (Mauritania) Moctar Sidi El Hacen
- (Mauritania) Mohamed Soudani
- (Mauritius) Kévin Bru
- (Morocco) Nordin Amrabat
- (Morocco) Khalid Boutaïb
- (Morocco) Fayçal Fajr
- (Mozambique) Nelson Divrassone
- (Mozambique) Mexer
- (Mozambique) Zainadine
- (Namibia) Deon Hotto
- (Namibia) Benson Shilongo
- (Namibia) Petrus Shitembi
- (Niger) Amadou Moutari
- (Niger) Youssouf Oumarou
- (Nigeria) Chidozie Awaziem
- (Nigeria) Samuel Kalu
- (Nigeria) Henry Onyekuru
- (Nigeria) Moses Simon
- (Rwanda) Meddie Kagere
- (Rwanda) Ernest Sugira
- (São Tomé and Príncipe) Harramiz
- (São Tomé and Príncipe) Zé
- (Senegal) Keita Baldé
- (Senegal) Pape Abou Cissé
- (Senegal) Moussa Konaté
- (Senegal) Sidy Sarr
- (Seychelles) Leroy Coralie
- (Seychelles) Rody Melanie
- (Seychelles) Perry Monnaie
- (Sierra Leone) Umaru Bangura
- (Sierra Leone) Julius Wobay
- (South Africa) Thulani Hlatshwayo
- (South Africa) Teboho Mokoena
- (South Africa) Lebo Mothiba
- (South Africa) Dino Ndlovu
- (South Africa) Tokelo Rantie
- (South Sudan) Dominic Aboi
- (South Sudan) Leon Uso Khamis
- (South Sudan) Atak Lual
- (South Sudan) Dominic Abui Pretino
- (South Sudan) Athir Thomas
- (South Sudan) Duku Wurube
- (Sudan) Abuaagla Abdalla
- (Sudan) Seif Teiri
- (Sudan) Athar El Tahir
- (Sudan) Mohamed Musa Idris
- (Sudan) Yasir Muzamil
- (Tanzania) Aggrey Morris
- (Tanzania) Erasto Nyoni
- (Togo) Emmanuel Adebayor
- (Togo) Floyd Ayité
- (Togo) Kévin Denkey
- (Togo) Kodjo Fo-Doh Laba
- (Tunisia) Anice Badri
- (Tunisia) Syam Ben Youssef
- (Uganda) Patrick Kaddu
- (Uganda) Geoffrey Sserunkuma
- (Zambia) Lazarous Kambole
- (Zambia) Donashano Malama
- (Zambia) Stoppila Sunzu
- (Zimbabwe) Ronald Pfumbidzai

1 own goal

- (Burundi) Omar Ngando (against Gabon)
- (Equatorial Guinea) Luis Meseguer (against Senegal)
- (Ghana) Nicholas Opoku (against Kenya)
- (São Tomé and Príncipe) Jordão Diogo (against Madagascar)
- (Senegal) Kalidou Koulibaly (against Madagascar)
- (Seychelles) Nigel Hoareau (against South Africa)
- (South Africa) Buhle Mkhwanazi (against Nigeria)
- (South Sudan) Hassan James (against Gabon)
- (Zimbabwe) Teenage Hadebe (against DR Congo)
