= Mauritania national football team results (1961–2019) =

These are the Mauritania national football team all time results:

== 1985 ==
8 March 1985 1986 CANQ	Algeria	4–0	Mauritania	Algiers, Algeria
	Belloumi 6' (pen.); Bouiche 27'; Cissé 58' (o.g.); Menad 68'	Report		Stadium: 5 July Stadium; Attendance: 4,000; Referee: Habib Mimouni (Tunisia)

22 March 1985 1986 CANQ	Mauritania	1–1	Algeria	Nouakchott, Mauritania
	Dieng 19'	Report	Bouiche 43'	Stadium: Stade Olympique; Attendance: 12,000; Referee: Cheikh D'Jibril M'Baye (Senegal)

== 1987 ==
13 December 1987 1988 Arab Q	Tunisia	2–1	Mauritania	Algiers, Algeria
	Maâloul 37' (pen.); Mahjoubi 84'		Sikki 16'	Stadium: 5 July Stadium

15 December 1987 1988 Arab Q	Algeria	3–0	Mauritania	Algiers, Algeria
	Boukar 44'; Djahmoune 52'; Dahmani 85'			Stadium: 5 July Stadium; Attendance: 3,000

== 1995 ==
3 November 1995 Friendly	Algeria	4–0	Mauritania	Tunis, Tunisia
	Zekri 24'; Dahleb 42'; Meftah 53'; Belatoui 74' (pen.)	Report		Attendance: 10,000; Referee: Zubeir Nuira (Tunisia)

== 2012 ==
15 April 2012	Mauritania	0–3	Egypt	Abu Dhabi, UAE

18 April 2012	Mauritania	0–2	Iran	Tehran, Iran
16:00				Attendance: 100

15 May 2012	Mauritania	1–3	Kurdistan Region	Hebron, Palestine
16:00

17 May 2012	Mauritania	0–2	Indonesia	Nablus, Palestine
16:00				Attendance: 90

== 2013 ==
8 September 2013 Friendly	Canada	0–0	Mauritania	Oliva, Spain
17:30		Report		Stadium: Oliva Nova Beach & Golf Resort Campo 1 Attendance: 300; Referee: Carlos del Cerro Grande (Spain)

10 September 2013 Friendly	Canada	0–1	Mauritania	Oliva, Spain
17:30		Report	Ba 53'	Stadium: Oliva Nova Beach & Golf Resort Campo 1 Attendance: 200; Referee: Antonio Mateu Lahoz (Spain)

9 October 2013 Friendly	Oman	0–0	Mauritania	Muscat, Oman
18:30 UTC+4		Report		Stadium: Sultan Qaboos Sports Complex

== 2014 ==
5 March 2014 Friendly	Mauritania	1–1	Niger	Nouakchott, Mauritania
17:00	Boureima 3' (o.g.)	Report	Daouda 86'	Stadium: Stade Olympique; Referee: Daouda Guèye (Senegal)

12 April 2014 2015 ACN Q	Mauritania	1–0	Mauritius	Nouakchott, Mauritania
17:00	Ba 23'	Report		Stadium: Stade Olympique; Referee: Maguette N'Diaye (Senegal)

20 April 2014 2015 ACN Q	Mauritius	0–2	Mauritania	Curepipe, Mauritius
		Report	Sow 38'; Bessam 90+2'	Stadium: Stade George V Referee: Samuel Chirindza (Mozambique)

19 July 2014 2015 ACN Q	Uganda	2–0	Mauritania	Kampala, Uganda
17:00	Majwega 48'; Massa 70'	Report		Stadium: Mandela National Stadium; Referee: Hudu Munyemana (Rwanda)

3 August 2014 2015 ACN Q	Mauritania	0–1	Uganda	Nouakchott, Mauritania
17:00		Report	Ssentongo 90+2'	Stadium: Stade Olympique; Referee: Mehdi Abid Charef (Algeria)

== 2015 ==
14 June 2015 2017 ACN Q	Cameroon	1–0	Mauritania	Yaoundé, Cameroon
15:00 UTC+1	Aboubakar 89'	Report (CAF)		Stadium: Stade Ahmadou Ahidjo; Referee: Yakhouba Keita (Guinea)

5 September 2015 2017 ACN Q	Mauritania	3–1	South Africa	Nouakchott, Mauritania
17:00 UTC±0	Abeid 5'; Bagili 77'; Moulaye Ahmed 85'	Report (CAF)	Gabuza 68'	Stadium: Stade Olympique; Referee: Daouda Guèye (Senegal)

7 October 2015 2018 World Cup Q first round	South Sudan	1–1	Mauritania	Juba, South Sudan
16:30 UTC+3	Abui Pretino 5'	Report (FIFA); Report (CAF)	Bagili 3'	Stadium: Juba Stadium; Attendance: 10,000; Referee: Rajab Bakasambe (Uganda)

13 October 2015 2018 World Cup Q first round	Mauritania	4–0	South Sudan	Nouakchott, Mauritania
17:00 UTC±0	Moulaye Ahmed 3'; Bagili 61'; M. Samba 84'; Diakité 90+2'	Report (FIFA); Report (CAF)		Stadium: Stade Olympique; Attendance: 9,000; Referee: Fidel Gomes (Guinea-Bissau)

13 November 2015 2018 World Cup Q second round	Mauritania	1–2	Tunisia	Nouakchott, Mauritania
17:00 UTC±0	N'Diaye 22'	Report (FIFA); Report (CAF)	Khazri 62'; Chikhaoui 68'	Stadium: Stade Olympique; Attendance: 9,000; Referee: Eric Otogo-Castane (Gabon)

17 November 2015 2018 World Cup Q second round	Tunisia	2–1	Mauritania	Radès, Tunisia
18:00 UTC+1	Ben Youssef 51'; Bguir 84'	Report (FIFA); Report (CAF)	Moulaye Ahmed 71'	Stadium: Stade Olympique de Radès; Attendance: 3,000; Referee: Denis Batte (Uganda)

== 2017 ==
7 January 2017 Friendly	Algeria	3–1	Mauritania	Blida, Algeria
	Hanni 53'; Bounedjah 73'; Bentaleb 90+2'	Report	Hacen 19' (pen.)	Stadium: Stade Mustapha Tchaker; Referee: Boubou Traore (Mali)

24 March 2017 Friendly	Mauritania	1–0	Benin	Nouakchott, Mauritania
	Ahmed 89' (pen.)	Report		Stadium: Stade Olympique; Referee: Sékou Touré (Guinea)

27 March 2017 Friendly	Mauritania	2–1	Congo	Nouakchott, Mauritania
	Hacen 39'; Soudani 60'	Report	Diarra 32' (o.g.)	Stadium: Stade Olympique; Referee: Maudo Jallaow (Gambia)

12 May 2017 Friendly	Senegal	2–0	Mauritania	Dakar, Senegal
	Papa Waigo 11' (pen.); Guèye 20' (pen.)	Report		Stadium: Stade Demba Diop

4 June 2017 Friendly	Lesotho	1–0	Mauritania	Maseru, Lesotho
	Kalake 43'	Report		Stadium: Setsoto Stadium; Referee: Tinyiko Hlungwani (South Africa)

9 June 2017 2019 AFCONQ	Botswana	0–1	Mauritania	Francistown, Botswana
15:30 UTC+2		Report	Soudani 78'	Stadium: Francistown Stadium; Referee: Davies Omweno (Kenya)

8 July 2017 Friendly	Mauritania	2–1	Senegal	Nouakchott, Mauritania
				Stadium: Stade Cheikha Ould Boïdiya

16 July 2017 2018 CHANQ	Liberia	0–2	Mauritania	Monrovia, Liberia
16:00 GMT		Report	Dellahi 35'; Bagili 61'	Stadium: Samuel Kanyon Doe Sports Complex; Referee: Baba Leno (Guinea)

23 July 2017 2018 CHANQ	Mauritania	0–1 (2–1 agg.)	Liberia	Zouérat, Mauritania
17:00 GMT		Report	Jackson 45'	Stadium: Stade Municipal Zouérate; Referee: Boubou Traoré (Mali)

12 August 2017 2018 CHANQ	Mauritania	2–2	Mali	Nouakchott, Mauritania
17:00 GMT	Gaye 11'; Samba 18'	Report	Konté 1'; Diarra 22'	Stadium: Stade Olympique; Referee: Sékou Ahmed Touré (Guinea)

19 August 2017 2018 CHANQ	Mali	0–1 (2–3 agg.)	Mauritania	Bamako, Mali
16:30 GMT		Report	Gaye 28'	Stadium: Stade Modibo Kéïta; Referee: Ibrahim Nour El Din (Egypt)

5 September 2017 Friendly	Niger	2–0	Mauritania	Agadir, Morocco
17:00 WEST		Report		Stadium: Stade Adrar

11 September 2017 2017 WAFU Nations Cup 1st round	Mali	3–1	Mauritania	Cape Coast, Ghana
15:00 GMT	Konte 30'; Kone 88', 91'	Report	Cheikh 36'	Stadium: Cape Coast Sports Stadium; Referee: Daouda Gueye (Senegal)

6 October 2017 Friendly	Mauritania	0–1	Comoros	Tunis, Tunisia
19:00 UTC+1			M'Changama 84'	Stadium: Stade El Menzah

== 2018 ==
24 March 2018 Friendly	Mauritania	2–0	Guinea	Nouakchott, Mauritania
17:00 GMT	Hacen 52'; Voulany 70'	Report		Stadium: Stade Olympique

8 September 2018 2019 AFCONQ	Mauritania	2–0	Burkina Faso	Nouakchott, Mauritania
17:00 GMT	Diakité 36'; Camara 40'	Report		Stadium: Stade Olympique; Referee: Louis Hakizimana (Rwanda)

12 October 2018 2019 AFCONQ	Angola	4–1	Mauritania	Luanda, Angola
16:00 WAT	Mateus 13' (pen.), 16'; Djalma 52'; Gelson 80'	Report	Hacen 3'	Stadium: Estádio 11 de Novembro; Referee: Thierry Nkurunziza (Burundi)

16 October 2018 2019 AFCONQ	Mauritania	1–0	Angola	Nouakchott, Mauritania
17:00 GMT	Ba 18'	Report		Stadium: Stade Olympique; Referee: Sadok Selmi (Tunisia)

18 November 2018 2019 AFCONQ	Mauritania	2–1	Botswana	Nouakchott, Mauritania
17:00 GMT	Hacen 20'; Diakité 84'	Report	Kobe 4'	Stadium: Stade Cheikha Ould Boïdiya; Referee: Hassan Mohamed Hagi (Somalia)

== 2019 ==
22 March 2019 2019 AFCONQ	Burkina Faso	1–0	Mauritania	Ouagadougou, Burkina Faso
17:00 GMT	Traoré 19'	Report		Stadium: Stade du 4 Août; Referee: Jean-Jacques Ndala Ngambo (DR Congo)

14 June 2019 Friendly	Mauritania	3–1	Madagascar	Marrakesh, Morocco
16:30 GMT		Report		Stadium: Marrakesh Stadium

18 June 2019 Friendly	Benin	3–1	Mauritania	Marrakesh, Morocco
16:30 GMT	Mounié 42', 61', 81'	Report	Hacen 47' (pen.)	Stadium: Marrakesh Stadium

24 June 2019 2019 AFCON	Mali	4–1	Mauritania	Suez, Egypt
22:00 CAT	Diaby 37'; Marega 45' (pen.); A. Traoré 55'; A. Traoré 74'	Report	Hacen 72' (pen.)	Stadium: Suez Stadium; Attendance: 6,202; Referee: Jean Jacques Ngambo (DR Congo)

29 June 2019 2019 AFCON	Mauritania	0–0	Angola	Suez, Egypt
16:30 CAT		Report		Stadium: Suez Stadium; Attendance: 10,120; Referee: Ibrahim Nour El Din (Egypt)

2 July 2019 2019 AFCON	Mauritania	0–0	Tunisia	Suez, Egypt
21:00 CAT		Report		Stadium: Suez Stadium; Referee: Louis Hakizimana (Rwanda)

27 July 2019 2020 CHAN Q	Cape Verde	0–0	Mauritania	Praia, Cape Verde
16:30		Report		Stadium: Estádio Nacional de Cabo Verde; Referee: Bonifacio Julio da Silva (Guinea-Bissau)

3 August 2019 2020 CHAN Q	Mauritania	2–1 (2–1 agg.)	Cape Verde	Nouakchott, Mauritania
17:00	Touda 2', 68'	Report	Papalélé 90'	Stadium: Stade Olympique; Referee: Adissa Abdul Raphiou Ligali (Benin)

6 September 2019 Friendly	Tunisia	1–0	Mauritania	Radès, Tunisia
18:15	Layouni 78'	Report		Stadium: Stade Olympique de Radès; Attendance: 12,000; Referee: Ibrahim Nour El Din (Egypt)

21 September 2019 2020 CHAN Q	Mauritania	0–0	Mali	Nouakchott, Mauritania
17:00		Report		Stadium: Stade Olympique; Referee: Slim Belkhaouas (Tunisia)

28 September 2019 2019 WAFU	Burkina Faso	1–1 (4–3 p)	Mauritania	Thiès, Senegal
20:00	Pognongo 85' (pen.)		Denne 73'	Stadium: Stade Lat-Dior; Referee: Bangaly Konate (Guinea)

4 October 2019 2019 WAFU	Mauritania	0–0 (2–4 p)	Gambia	Thiès, Senegal
20:00				Stadium: Stade Lat-Dior; Referee: Salisu Basheer (Nigeria)

15 October 2019 Friendly	Mauritania	0–0	Libya	Nouakchott, Mauritania
18:00		Report		Stadium: Stade Cheikha Ould Boïdiya; Referee: Boubou Traoré (Mali)

20 October 2019 2020 CHAN Q	Mali	2–0	Mauritania	Bamako, Mali
16:00	Coulibaly 42'; Sissoko 84'	Report		Stadium: Stade Modibo Kéïta

15 November 2019 2021 AFCONQ	Morocco	0–0	Mauritania	Rabat, Morocco
20:00		Report		Stadium: Prince Moulay Abdellah Stadium; Referee: Louis Hakizimana (Rwanda)

19 November 2019 2021 AFCONQ	Mauritania	2–0	Central African Republic	Nouakchott, Mauritania
16:00	Hacen 27'; Guidileye 90+1'	Report		Stadium: Stade Cheikha Ould Boïdiya; Referee: Sadok Selmi (Tunisia)
