= 2019 Africa Cup of Nations qualification Group A =

Group A of the 2019 Africa Cup of Nations qualification tournament was one of the twelve groups to decide the teams which qualified for the 2019 Africa Cup of Nations finals tournament. The group consisted of four teams: Senegal, Equatorial Guinea, Sudan, and Madagascar (winners of the preliminary round).

The teams played against each other in home-and-away round-robin format between June 2017 and March 2019.

Senegal and Madagascar, the group winners and runners-up respectively, qualified for the 2019 Africa Cup of Nations.

== Standings ==
Pos	Team	Pld	W	D	L	GF	GA	GD	Pts	Qualification	Senegal national football team	Madagascar national football team	Equatorial Guinea national football team	Sudan national football team
1	Senegal	6	5	1	0	12	2	+10	16	Final tournament	—	2–0	3–0	3–0
2	Madagascar	6	3	1	2	8	8	0	10	Final tournament	2–2	—	1–0	1–3
3	Equatorial Guinea	6	2	0	4	5	7	−2	6		0–1	0–1	—	1–0
4	Sudan	6	1	0	5	5	13	−8	3		0–1	1–3	1–4	—

Source: CAF
Rules for classification: Qualification tiebreakers

== Matches ==
9 June 2017
22:00 UTC+3

Sudan	1–3	Madagascar
El Tahir 72'	Report	Andriatsima 15', 83'; Andriamatsinoro 62' (pen.)

El-Obeid Stadium, El-Obeid
Referee: Sadok Selmi (Tunisia)
10 June 2017
21:00 UTC+0

Senegal	3–0	Equatorial Guinea
Sow 1', 72'; Gueye 90'	Report

Stade Léopold Sédar Senghor, Dakar
Referee: Rédouane Jiyed (Morocco)

8 September 2018
16:00 UTC+1

Equatorial Guinea	1–0	Sudan
Nsue 30'	Report

Estadio de Bata, Bata
Referee: Hélder Martins de Carvalho (Angola)
9 September 2018
14:30 UTC+3

Madagascar	2–2	Senegal
Voavy 43'; Koulibaly 67' (o.g.)	Report	Konaté 26'; Keita 62'

Mahamasina Municipal Stadium, Antananarivo
Referee: Joshua Bondo (Botswana)

13 October 2018
16:00 UTC+1

Equatorial Guinea	0–1	Madagascar
	Report	Andriatsima 19'

Estadio de Bata, Bata
Referee: Mehdi Abid Charef (Algeria)
13 October 2018
19:00 UTC+0

Senegal	3–0	Sudan
Cissé 17'; Gueye 18'; Niang 50'	Report

Stade Léopold Sédar Senghor, Dakar
Referee: Bamlak Tessema Weyesa (Ethiopia)

16 October 2018
14:30 UTC+3

Madagascar	1–0	Equatorial Guinea
Rakotoharimalala 42'	Report

Vontovorona Stadium, Antananarivo (Note: The final two home matches of Madagascar were switched from Mahamasina Municipal Stadium, Antananarivo to Vontovorona Stadium, Antananarivo after the CAF banned the stadium from being used following a deadly stampede during their home match against Senegal on 9 September 2018.)
Referee: Mahamadou Keita (Mali)
16 October 2018
19:30 UTC+2

Sudan	0–1	Senegal
	Report	S. Sarr 86'

Khartoum Stadium, Khartoum
Referee: Mustapha Ghorbal (Algeria)

17 November 2018
16:00 UTC+1

Equatorial Guinea	0–1	Senegal
	Report	Meseguer 52' (o.g.)

Estadio de Bata, Bata
Referee: Mahmoud El Banna (Egypt)
18 November 2018
14:30 UTC+3

Madagascar	1–3	Sudan
Andriamatsinoro 77'	Report	Musa 2'; Abuaagla 61'; Yasir 85'

Vontovorona Stadium, Antananarivo
Referee: Bamlak Tessema Weyesa (Ethiopia)

22 March 2019
16:00 UTC+2

Sudan	1–4	Equatorial Guinea
Teiri 15'	Report	Nsue 19' (pen.), 36' (pen.); Ganet 49'; Obiang 85'

Al-Hilal Stadium, Omdurman
Referee: Sékou Ahmed Touré (Guinea)
23 March 2019
19:00 UTC+0

Senegal	2–0	Madagascar
Niang 27', 56'	Report

Stade Lat-Dior, Thiès
Referee: Youssef Essrayri (Tunisia)

== Goalscorers ==
There were 30 goals scored in 12 matches, for an average of 2.5 goals per match.

3 goals

- (Equatorial Guinea) Emilio Nsue
- (Madagascar) Faneva Imà Andriatsima
- (Senegal) M'Baye Niang

2 goals

- (Madagascar) Carolus Andriamatsinoro
- (Senegal) Idrissa Gueye
- (Senegal) Moussa Sow

1 goal

- (Equatorial Guinea) Pablo Ganet
- (Equatorial Guinea) Pedro Obiang
- (Madagascar) Njiva Rakotoharimalala
- (Madagascar) Paulin Voavy
- (Senegal) Keita Baldé
- (Senegal) Pape Abou Cissé
- (Senegal) Moussa Konaté
- (Senegal) Sidy Sarr
- (Sudan) Abuaagla Abdalla
- (Sudan) Seif Teiri
- (Sudan) Athar El Tahir
- (Sudan) Mohamed Musa Idris
- (Sudan) Yasir Muzamil

1 own goal

- (Equatorial Guinea) Luis Meseguer (against Senegal)
- (Senegal) Kalidou Koulibaly (against Madagascar)
