= 2019 Africa Cup of Nations qualification Group I =

Group I of the 2019 Africa Cup of Nations qualification tournament was one of the twelve groups to decide the teams which qualified for the 2019 Africa Cup of Nations finals tournament. The group consisted of four teams: Burkina Faso, Angola, Botswana, and Mauritania.

The teams played against each other in home-and-away round-robin format between June 2017 and March 2019.

Angola and Mauritania, the group winners and runners-up respectively, qualified for the 2019 Africa Cup of Nations.

== Standings ==
Pos	Team	Pld	W	D	L	GF	GA	GD	Pts	Qualification	Angola national football team	Mauritania national football team	Burkina Faso national football team	Botswana national football team
1	Angola	6	4	0	2	9	6	+3	12 (Note: Head-to-head goal difference: Angola 2, Mauritania –2.)	Final tournament	—	4–1	2–1	1–0
2	Mauritania	6	4	0	2	7	6	+1	12	Final tournament	1–0	—	2–0	2–1
3	Burkina Faso	6	3	1	2	8	5	+3	10		3–1	1–0	—	3–0
4	Botswana	6	0	1	5	1	8	−7	1		0–1	0–1	0–0	—

Source: CAF'
Rules for classification: Qualification tiebreakers

== Matches ==
10 June 2017
15:30 UTC+2

Botswana	0–1	Mauritania
	Report	Soudani 77'

Francistown Stadium, Francistown
Referee: Davies Omweno (Kenya)
10 June 2017
18:00 UTC+0

Burkina Faso	3–1	Angola
Bancé 21', 42' (pen.); B. Traoré 79'	Report	Gelson 23'

Stade du 4 Août, Ouagadougou
Referee: Mahmoud El Banna (Egypt)

8 September 2018
17:00 UTC+0

Mauritania	2–0	Burkina Faso
Diakité 37'; Camara 39'	Report

Stade Cheikha Ould Boïdiya, Nouakchott
Referee: Louis Hakizimana (Rwanda)
9 September 2018
16:00 UTC+1

Angola	1–0	Botswana
Gelson 30'	Report

Estádio 11 de Novembro, Luanda
Referee: Bakary Gassama (Gambia)

12 October 2018
16:00 UTC+1

Angola	4–1	Mauritania
Mateus 12' (pen.), 16'; Djalma 52'; Gelson 80'	Report	El Hacen 2'

Estádio 11 de Novembro, Luanda
Referee: Thierry Nkurunziza (Burundi)
13 October 2018
18:00 UTC+0

Burkina Faso	3–0	Botswana
Pitroipa 4'; Diawara 48'; A. Traoré 61'	Report

Stade du 4 Août, Ouagadougou
Referee: Bienvenu Sinko (Ivory Coast)

16 October 2018
19:00 UTC+2

Botswana	0–0	Burkina Faso
	Report

Francistown Stadium, Francistown
Referee: Peter Waweru (Kenya)
16 October 2018
17:00 UTC+0

Mauritania	1–0	Angola
Ba 17'	Report

Stade Cheikha Ould Boïdiya, Nouakchott
Referee: Sadok Selmi (Tunisia)

18 November 2018
16:00 UTC+1

Angola	2–1	Burkina Faso
Mateus 45+1', 57'	Report	Dayo 69'

Estádio 11 de Novembro, Luanda
Referee: Jean-Jacques Ndala (DR Congo)
18 November 2018
17:00 UTC+0

Mauritania	2–1	Botswana
Diakité 20', 84'	Report	Kobe 4'

Stade Cheikha Ould Boïdiya, Nouakchott
Referee: Hassan Mohamed Hagi (Somalia)

22 March 2019
19:00 UTC+2

Botswana	0–1	Angola
	Report	Eduardo 21'

Francistown Stadium, Francistown
Referee: Amin Mohamed Omar (Egypt)
22 March 2019
17:00 UTC+0

Burkina Faso	1–0	Mauritania
B. Traoré 19'	Report

Stade du 4 Août, Ouagadougou
Referee: Jean-Jacques Ndala (DR Congo)

== Goalscorers ==
There were 25 goals scored in 12 matches, for an average of 2.08 goals per match.

4 goals

- (Angola) Mateus

3 goals

- (Angola) Gelson
- (Mauritania) Ismaël Diakité

2 goals

- (Burkina Faso) Aristide Bancé
- (Burkina Faso) Bertrand Traoré

1 goal

- (Angola) Djalma
- (Angola) Wilson Eduardo
- (Botswana) Keeagile Kobe
- (Burkina Faso) Issoufou Dayo
- (Burkina Faso) Banou Diawara
- (Burkina Faso) Jonathan Pitroipa
- (Burkina Faso) Abdou Razack Traoré
- (Mauritania) Adama Ba
- (Mauritania) Khassa Camara
- (Mauritania) Moctar Sidi El Hacen
- (Mauritania) Mohamed Soudani
