= 2019 Africa Cup of Nations qualification Group B =

Group B of the 2019 Africa Cup of Nations qualification tournament was one of the twelve groups to decide the teams which qualified for the 2019 Africa Cup of Nations finals tournament. The group consisted of four teams: Cameroon, Morocco, Malawi, and Comoros (winners of the preliminary round).

The teams played against each other in home-and-away round-robin format between June 2017 and March 2019.

On 12 March 2017, the Football Association of Malawi announced their senior national football team would withdraw from the competition due to the lack of funding. However, they later announced its reversal of this decision and would continue to compete.

Morocco and Cameroon, the group winners and runners-up respectively, qualified for the 2019 Africa Cup of Nations.

Cameroon were the original hosts of the final tournament and would have been guaranteed of qualification regardless of their ranking; the matches of the team would have counted in determining the qualification of the other teams, and only the top team apart from Cameroon would have qualified for the final tournament. However, on 30 November 2018, Cameroon were stripped of hosting the 2019 Africa Cup of Nations. due to the Boko Haram insurgency and the Anglophone Crisis.

== Standings ==
Pos	Team	Pld	W	D	L	GF	GA	GD	Pts	Qualification	Morocco national football team	Cameroon national football team	Malawi national football team	Comoros national football team
1	Morocco	6	3	2	1	8	3	+5	11 (Note: Head-to-head goal difference: Morocco 1, Cameroon –1.)	Final tournament	—	2–0	3–0	1–0
2	Cameroon	6	3	2	1	6	3	+3	11	Final tournament	1–0	—	1–0	3–0
3	Malawi	6	1	2	3	2	6	−4	5 (Note: Head-to-head away goals scored: Malawi 1, Comoros 0.)		0–0	0–0	—	1–0
4	Comoros	6	1	2	3	5	9	−4	5		2–2	1–1	2–1	—

Source: CAF
Rules for classification: Qualification tiebreakers

== Matches ==
10 June 2017
14:30 UTC+2

Malawi	1–0	Comoros
G. Phiri 32'	Report

Kamuzu Stadium, Blantyre
Referee: Denis Dembélé (Ivory Coast)
10 June 2017
15:00 UTC+1

Cameroon	1–0	Morocco
Aboubakar 28'	Report

Stade Ahmadou Ahidjo, Yaoundé
Referee: Bamlak Tessema Weyesa (Ethiopia)

8 September 2018
15:00 UTC+3

Comoros	1–1	Cameroon
Ben Nabouhane 15'	Report	Bahoken 80'

Stade Said Mohamed Cheikh, Mitsamiouli
Referee: Gehad Grisha (Egypt)
8 September 2018
21:00 UTC+1

Morocco	3–0	Malawi
Ziyech 3'; En-Nesyri 42', 78'	Report

Stade Mohammed V, Casablanca
Referee: Jean-Jacques Ndala (DR Congo)

12 October 2018
15:30 UTC+1

Cameroon	1–0	Malawi
Choupo-Moting 63'	Report

Stade Ahmadou Ahidjo, Yaoundé
Referee: Youssef Essrayri (Tunisia)
13 October 2018
19:00 UTC+1

Morocco	1–0	Comoros
Fajr 90+7' (pen.)	Report

Stade Mohammed V, Casablanca
Referee: Ali Lemghaifry (Mauritania)

16 October 2018
15:00 UTC+3

Comoros	2–2	Morocco
Ben Nabouhane 8', 89'	Report	Boutaïb 53'; Amrabat 61'

Stade Said Mohamed Cheikh, Mitsamiouli
Referee: Davies Omweno (Kenya)
16 October 2018
14:30 UTC+2

Malawi	0–0	Cameroon
	Report

Kamuzu Stadium, Blantyre
Referee: Victor Gomes (South Africa)

16 November 2018
20:00 UTC+1

Morocco	2–0	Cameroon
Ziyech 54' (pen.), 66'	Report

Stade Mohammed V, Casablanca
Referee: Eric Otogo-Castane (Gabon)
17 November 2018
15:00 UTC+3

Comoros	2–1	Malawi
Ben Nabouhane 2'; Chamed 67'	Report	P. Phiri 65'

Stade de Moroni, Moroni
Referee: Louis Hakizimana (Rwanda)

22 March 2019
15:00 UTC+2

Malawi	0–0	Morocco
	Report

Bingu National Stadium, Lilongwe
Referee: Hélder Martins de Carvalho (Angola)
23 March 2019
16:00 UTC+1

Cameroon	3–0	Comoros
Choupo-Moting 37'; Bassogog 53'; N'Jie 89'	Report

Stade Ahmadou Ahidjo, Yaoundé
Referee: Bakary Gassama (Gambia)

== Goalscorers ==
There were 21 goals scored in 12 matches, for an average of 1.75 goals per match.

4 goals

- (Comoros) El Fardou Ben Nabouhane

3 goals

- (Morocco) Hakim Ziyech

2 goals

- (Cameroon) Eric Maxim Choupo-Moting
- (Morocco) Youssef En-Nesyri

1 goal

- (Cameroon) Vincent Aboubakar
- (Cameroon) Stéphane Bahoken
- (Cameroon) Christian Bassogog
- (Cameroon) Clinton N'Jie
- (Comoros) Nasser Chamed
- (Malawi) Gerald Phiri Jr.
- (Malawi) Patrick Phiri
- (Morocco) Noureddine Amrabat
- (Morocco) Khalid Boutaïb
- (Morocco) Fayçal Fajr
