= Patrick Kaddu =

Ugandan footballer (born 1995)

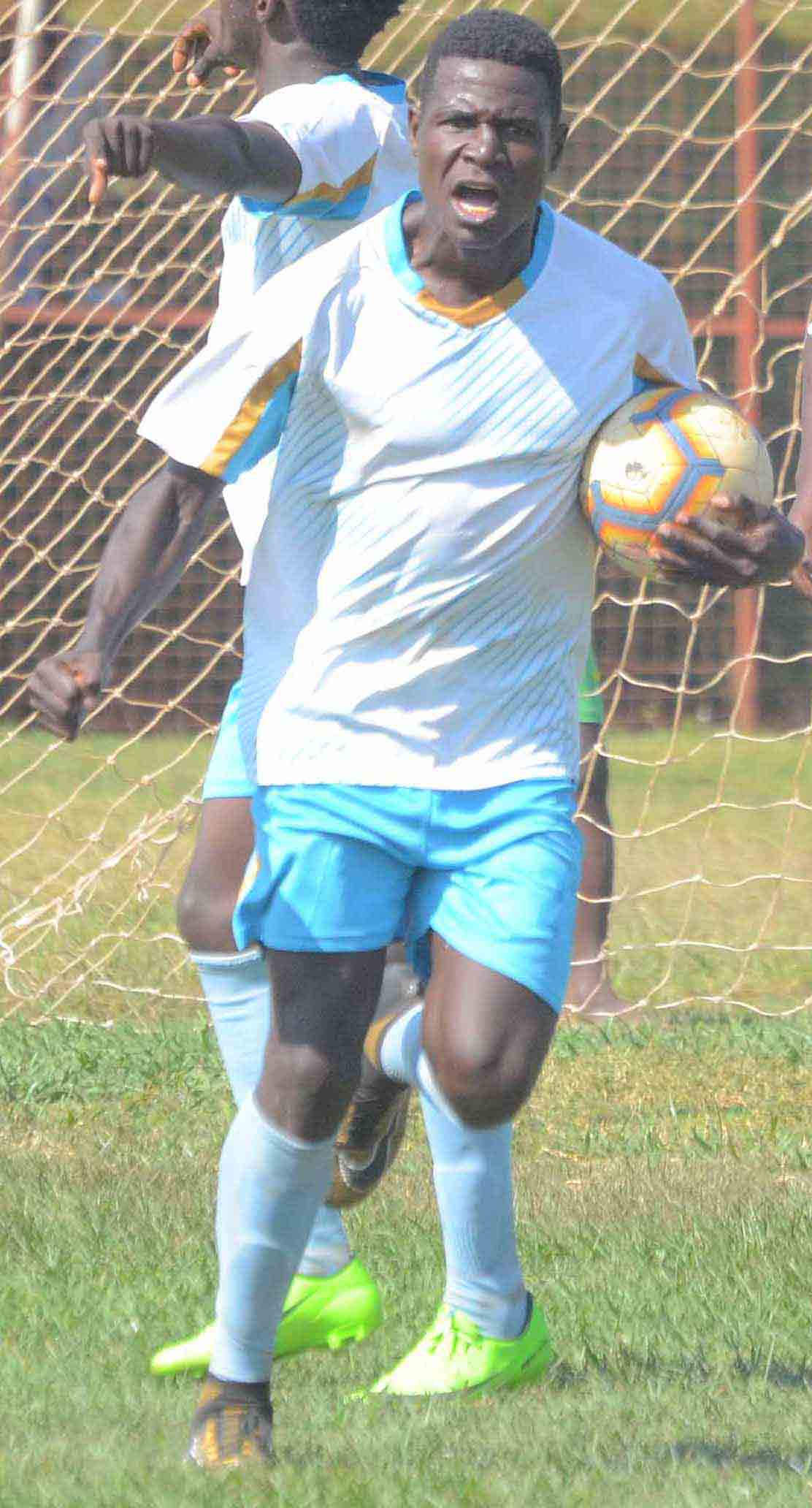

Personal information
- Full name: Patrick Henry Kaddu
- Date of birth: 9 October 1995 (age 31)
- Place of birth: Uganda
- Height: 1.77 m (5 ft 10 in)
- Position: Striker

Team information
- Current team: Kitara

Youth career
- Destiny Soccer Academy
- Butabika Soccer Academy
- Luzira United
- Kyebando FC

Senior career*
Years	Team	Apps	(Gls)
2011–2014	Maroons		
2014–2015	Kiira Young		(7)
2015–2017	Maroons		(26)
2017–2019	KCCA	64	(32)
2019–2020	RS Berkane	7	(0)
2020	→ Ismaily SC (loan)	1	(1)
2020–2021	Youssoufia Berrechid	15	(2)
2021–	KCCA		

International career^{‡}
2018–	Uganda	21	(9)
- * Club domestic league appearances and goals ‡ National team caps and goals as of 10 October 2022

Patrick Henry Kaddu (born 9 October 1995) is a Ugandan professional footballer who plays as a striker for Uganda Premier League club Kitara and the Uganda national team.

== Early life ==
Patrick Henry Kaddu was born in a family of six to Efusa Nsubuga and Hadija Nakitende. Kaddu is the fourth born and grew up in Bbiina in the heart of Luzira, a Kampala suburb. Like all his siblings, Kaddu had a troubled education, often skipping from Mukama Kyakuwa nursery school and St James primary school for fees defaulting. But after so much persistence, in 2005, Kaddu completed his Primary Leaving Examinations, although he could not get his results because he had not cleared his fees. However, that was least of the problems as right about that time, his father sold off their home, and disappeared, leaving the rest of the family homeless.

His mother left Luzira to look for more income, but Kaddu remained in Luzira, and lived on his own, keeping up with his village football team Destiny Soccer Academy.

== Club career ==
Kaddu first joined Maroons in 2011, but was not able to play immediately because of more established senior players like George Abege, Ibrahim Kongo and Pate Wanok. He left them in 2014, following their relegation, to join Kiira Young in the top flight for the 2014–15 season. He scored 6 goals in the league before Kiira were relegated.

He then returned to Maroons for the 2015–16 season and was the club's top-scorer with eight goals, although the club was relegated. In the FUFA Big League during the 2016–2017 season, Kaddu inspired them back into the UPL. He was the FBL's top-scorer with 18 goals in 22 games.

In 2017, Kaddu joined KCCA, but was not able to get much game time initially from coach Mike Mutebi. In June 2018, he led KCCA's line against Vipers in the Uganda cup final in Bukedea, and played a big hand in his team's winning goal and also finished the tournament with its top scorer with 7 goals. During his 2-year stint at KCCA, Kaddu scored 32 goals in 64 games for the Lugogo-based club.

=== RS Berkane ===
In August 2019, Kaddu joined RS Berkane on a 4-year deal.

==== Loan to Ismaily SC ====
In February 2020, Kaddu joined Ismaily SC on a six-month loan deal until June 30, 2020 with an option to buy for about $100k. On March 9, 2020 he scored his first goal for Ismaily SC against El Gouna FC which held to a 1–1 draw. However, the Egyptian club decided not to trigger the buying option.

=== Youssoufia Berrechid ===
On 5 December 2020, Kaddu moved to Botola club Youssoufia Berrechid on a deal for the rest of the season.

== International career ==
On 17 November 2018, Kaddu scored his first ever international goal in a 1–0 win against Cape Verde in 2019 Africa Cup of Nations qualification, sealing Uganda's qualification in the 2019 Africa Cup of Nations.

On 12 June 2019, Kaddu was named in Uganda's 23-man squad for the 2019 Africa Cup of Nations in Egypt. On 22 June 2019, he scored in his sides 2–0 opening match win against DR Congo.

== Career statistics ==
=== International ===
As of 10 October 2022

National team	Year	Apps	Goals
Uganda	2018	5	1
Uganda	2019	10	5
Uganda	2021	2	0
Uganda	2022	4	3
Total		21	9

=== International goals ===
Scores and results list Uganda's goal tally first.

No.	Date	Venue	Opponent	Score	Result	Competition
1.	17 November 2018	Mandela National Stadium, Kampala, Uganda	Cape Verde	1–0	1–0	2019 Africa Cup of Nations qualification
2.	22 June 2019	Cairo International Stadium, Cairo, Egypt	DR Congo	1–0	2–0	2019 Africa Cup of Nations
3.	27 July 2019	El Hadj Hassan Gouled Aptidon Stadium, Djibouti City, Djibouti	Somalia	1–0	3–1	2020 African Nations Championship qualification
4.	3 August 2019	Philip Omondi Stadium, Kampala, Uganda	Somalia	1–0	4–1	2020 African Nations Championship qualification
5.	3 August 2019	Philip Omondi Stadium, Kampala, Uganda	Somalia	3–0	4–1	2020 African Nations Championship qualification
6.	3 August 2019	Philip Omondi Stadium, Kampala, Uganda	Somalia	4–0	4–1	2020 African Nations Championship qualification
7.	12 January 2022	Titanic Deluxe Belek Football Center, Antalya, Turkey	Iceland	1–1	1–1	Friendly
8.	18 January 2022	Titanic Sports Center - Field 1, Belek, Turkey	Moldova	1–2	3–2	Friendly
9.	18 January 2022	Titanic Sports Center - Field 1, Belek, Turkey	Moldova	2–2	3–2	Friendly

== Honours ==
=== Club ===
KCCA

- Uganda Premier League: 2018-19
- Uganda Cup: 2018

=== Individual ===
- Uganda Cup Top Goalscorer: 2018
