= 2019 Africa Cup of Nations qualification Group G =

Group G of the 2019 Africa Cup of Nations qualification tournament was one of the twelve groups to decide the teams which qualified for the 2019 Africa Cup of Nations finals tournament. The group consisted of four teams: DR Congo, Congo, Zimbabwe, and Liberia.

The teams played against each other in home-and-away round-robin format between June 2017 and March 2019.

Zimbabwe and DR Congo, the group winners and runners-up respectively, qualified for the 2019 Africa Cup of Nations.

== Standings ==
Pos	Team	Pld	W	D	L	GF	GA	GD	Pts	Qualification	Zimbabwe national football team	DR Congo national football team	Liberia national football team	Congo national football team
1	Zimbabwe	6	3	2	1	9	4	+5	11	Final tournament	—	1–1	3–0	2–0
2	DR Congo	6	2	3	1	8	6	+2	9	Final tournament	1–2	—	1–0	3–1
3	Liberia	6	2	1	3	5	9	−4	7		1–0	1–1	—	2–1
4	Congo	6	1	2	3	7	10	−3	5		1–1	1–1	3–1	—

Source: CAF
Rules for classification: Qualification tiebreakers

== Matches ==
10 June 2017
18:30 UTC+1

DR Congo	3–1	Congo
Bakambu 19', 54'; Mbemba 90'	Report	Bifouma 45+1'

Stade des Martyrs, Kinshasa
Referee: Hamada Nampiandraza (Madagascar)
11 June 2017
15:00 UTC+2

Zimbabwe	3–0	Liberia
Musona 23', 49', 62'	Report

National Sports Stadium, Harare
Referee: Alex Muhabi (Uganda)

9 September 2018
15:30 UTC+1

Congo	1–1	Zimbabwe
Bifouma 50'	Report	Billiat 21'

Stade Alphonse Massemba-Débat, Brazzaville
Referee: Victor Gomes (South Africa)
9 September 2018
16:00 UTC+0

Liberia	1–1	DR Congo
Jebor 62'	Report	Elia 82'

Samuel Kanyon Doe Sports Complex, Monrovia
Referee: Boubou Traoré (Mali)

11 October 2018
15:30 UTC+1

Congo	3–1	Liberia
Ndockyt 15'; Ibara 61'; Oniangué 89'	Report	Johnson 47'

Stade Alphonse Massemba-Débat, Brazzaville
Referee: Abdullahi Shuaibu (Nigeria)
13 October 2018
18:30 UTC+1

DR Congo	1–2	Zimbabwe
Bolasie 90+2'	Report	Pfumbidzai 21'; Musona 68'

Stade des Martyrs, Kinshasa
Referee: Rédouane Jiyed (Morocco)

16 October 2018
19:00 UTC+2

Zimbabwe	1–1	DR Congo
Billiat 2'	Report	Hadebe 24' (o.g.)

National Sports Stadium, Harare
Referee: Gehad Grisha (Egypt)
16 October 2018
18:00 UTC+0

Liberia	2–1	Congo
Dennis Jr. 7'; Jebor 11'	Report	Ibara 12'

Samuel Kanyon Doe Sports Complex, Monrovia
Referee: Blaise Yuven Ngwa (Cameroon)

18 November 2018
15:30 UTC+1

Congo	1–1	DR Congo
Bifouma 38'	Report	Kasongo 25'

Stade Alphonse Massemba-Débat, Brazzaville
Referee: Sidi Alioum (Cameroon)
18 November 2018
16:00 UTC+0

Liberia	1–0	Zimbabwe
Jebor 72'	Report

Samuel Kanyon Doe Sports Complex, Monrovia
Referee: Maguette N'Diaye (Senegal)

24 March 2019
15:00 UTC+2

Zimbabwe	2–0	Congo
Billiat 20'; Musona 36'	Report

National Sports Stadium, Harare
Referee: El Fadil Mohamed (Sudan)
24 March 2019
14:00 UTC+1

DR Congo	1–0	Liberia
Bakambu 52'	Report

Stade des Martyrs, Kinshasa
Referee: Maguette N'Diaye (Senegal)

== Goalscorers ==
There were 29 goals scored in 12 matches, for an average of 2.42 goals per match.

5 goals

- (Zimbabwe) Knowledge Musona

3 goals

- (Republic of the Congo) Thievy Bifouma
- (Democratic Republic of the Congo) Cédric Bakambu
- (Liberia) William Jebor
- (Zimbabwe) Khama Billiat

2 goals

- (Republic of the Congo) Prince Ibara

1 goal

- (Republic of the Congo) Merveil Ndockyt
- (Republic of the Congo) Prince Oniangué
- (Democratic Republic of the Congo) Yannick Bolasie
- (Democratic Republic of the Congo) Kabongo Kasongo
- (Democratic Republic of the Congo) Chancel Mbemba
- (Democratic Republic of the Congo) Elia Meschak
- (Liberia) Teah Dennis Jr.
- (Liberia) Sam Johnson
- (Zimbabwe) Ronald Pfumbidzai

1 own goal

- (Zimbabwe) Teenage Hadebe (against DR Congo)
