= 2019 Africa Cup of Nations qualification Group F =

Qualification tournament

Group F of the 2019 Africa Cup of Nations qualification tournament was one of the twelve groups to decide the teams which qualified for the 2019 Africa Cup of Nations finals tournament. The group consisted of four teams: Ghana, Ethiopia, Sierra Leone, and Kenya, before Sierra Leone's disqualification.

The teams played against each other in home-and-away round-robin format between June 2017 and March 2019.

Ghana and Kenya, the group winners and runners-up respectively, qualified for the 2019 Africa Cup of Nations.

== Standings ==
Pos	Team	Pld	W	D	L	GF	GA	GD	Pts	Qualification	Ghana national football team	Kenya national football team	Ethiopia national football team	Sierra Leone national football team
1	Ghana	4	3	0	1	8	1	+7	9	Final tournament	—	1–0	5–0	Canc.
2	Kenya	4	2	1	1	4	1	+3	7	Final tournament	1–0	—	3–0	Canc.
3	Ethiopia	4	0	1	3	0	10	−10	1		0–2	0–0	—	~~1–0~~
4	Sierra Leone	0	0	0	0	0	0	0	0	Disqualified (Note: On 30 November 2018, the CAF decided to disqualify Sierra Leone from the qualifiers, and all their matches were annulled, due to FIFA's suspension of the Sierra Leone Football Association on 5 October 2018.)	Canc.	~~2–1~~	Canc.	—

Source: CAF
Rules for classification: Qualification tiebreakers

== Matches ==
10 June 2017
16:30 UTC+0

Sierra Leone	Annulled (originally 2–1)	Kenya
Wobay 22'; Bangura 69' (pen.)	Report	Olunga 75'

National Stadium, Freetown
Referee: Ferdinand Udoh (Nigeria)
11 June 2017
15:30 UTC+0

Ghana	5–0	Ethiopia
Gyan 10'; Boye 15'; Ofori 35'; Dwamena 48', 70'	Report

Baba Yara Stadium, Kumasi
Referee: Maguette N'Diaye (Senegal)

8 September 2018
16:00 UTC+3

Kenya	1–0	Ghana
Opoku 40' (o.g.)	Report

Moi International Sports Centre, Kasarani
Referee: Janny Sikazwe (Zambia)
9 September 2018
16:00 UTC+3

Ethiopia	Annulled (originally 1–0)	Sierra Leone
Kebede 36' (pen.)	Report

Hawassa International Stadium, Awasa
Referee: Sadok Selmi (Tunisia)

10 October 2018
16:00 UTC+3

Ethiopia	0–0	Kenya
	Report

Bahir Dar Stadium, Bahir Dar
Referee: Bakary Gassama (Gambia)
Not played (Note: The two qualifying matches between Ghana and Sierra Leone, originally scheduled for 11 October 2018 (16:00 UTC+0 at the Baba Yara Stadium, Kumasi in Ghana) and 14 October 2018 (16:30 UTC+0 at the National Stadium, Freetown in Sierra Leone), were cancelled by the CAF on 9 October 2018 due to FIFA's suspension of the Sierra Leone Football Association on 5 October 2018.)

Ghana	Cancelled	Sierra Leone
	Report

14 October 2018
16:00 UTC+3

Kenya	3–0	Ethiopia
Olunga 23'; Johana 27'; Wanyama 67' (pen.)	Report

Moi International Sports Centre, Kasarani
Referee: Ahmad Imtehaz Heeralall (Mauritius)
Not played

Sierra Leone	Cancelled	Ghana
	Report

18 November 2018
16:00 UTC+3

Ethiopia	0–2	Ghana
	Report	J. Ayew 3', 24' (pen.)

Addis Ababa Stadium, Addis Ababa
Referee: Mustapha Ghorbal (Algeria)
Not played (Note: The qualifying match between Kenya and Sierra Leone, originally scheduled for 18 November 2018 (16:00 UTC+3 at the Moi International Sports Centre, Kasarani in Kenya), was cancelled by the CAF on 12 November 2018 due to FIFA's suspension of the Sierra Leone Football Association on 5 October 2018.)

Kenya	Cancelled	Sierra Leone
	Report

23 March 2019
18:00 UTC+0

Ghana	1–0	Kenya
Ekuban 82'	Report

Accra Sports Stadium, Accra
Referee: Joshua Bondo (Botswana)
Not played (Note: The qualifying match between Sierra Leone and Ethiopia, originally scheduled for March 2019, was cancelled by the CAF due to the disqualification of Sierra Leone on 30 November 2018.)

Sierra Leone	Cancelled	Ethiopia
	Report

== Goalscorers ==
Note: Goals scored in annulled matches counted. There were 16 goals scored in 8 matches, for an average of 2 goals per match.

2 goals

- (Ghana) Jordan Ayew
- (Ghana) Raphael Dwamena
- (Kenya) Michael Olunga

1 goal

- (Ethiopia) Getaneh Kebede
- (Ghana) John Boye
- (Ghana) Caleb Ekuban
- (Ghana) Asamoah Gyan
- (Ghana) Ebenezer Ofori
- (Kenya) Eric Johana Omondi
- (Kenya) Victor Wanyama
- (Sierra Leone) Umaru Bangura
- (Sierra Leone) Julius Wobay

1 own goal

- (Ghana) Nicholas Opoku (against Kenya)
