= 2019 Africa Cup of Nations qualification Group L =

Group L of the 2019 Africa Cup of Nations qualification tournament was one of the twelve groups to decide the teams which qualified for the 2019 Africa Cup of Nations finals tournament. The group consisted of four teams: Cape Verde, Uganda, Tanzania, and Lesotho.

The teams played against each other in home-and-away round-robin format between June 2017 and March 2019.

Uganda and Tanzania, the group winners and runners-up respectively, qualified for the 2019 Africa Cup of Nations.

== Standings ==
Pos	Team	Pld	W	D	L	GF	GA	GD	Pts	Qualification	Uganda national football team	Tanzania national football team	Lesotho national football team	Cape Verde national football team
1	Uganda	6	4	1	1	7	3	+4	13	Final tournament	—	0–0	3–0	1–0
2	Tanzania	6	2	2	2	6	5	+1	8	Final tournament	3–0	—	1–1	2–0
3	Lesotho	6	1	3	2	3	7	−4	6		0–2	1–0	—	1–1
4	Cape Verde	6	1	2	3	4	5	−1	5		0–1	3–0	0–0	—

Source: CAF
Rules for classification: Qualification tiebreakers

== Matches ==
10 June 2017
20:00 UTC+3

Tanzania	1–1	Lesotho
Samatta 28'	Report	Tale 35'

National Stadium, Dar es Salaam
Referee: Djamal Aden (Djibouti)
11 June 2017 (Note: The Cape Verde v Uganda match was originally scheduled on 10 June 2017, 16:30 local time, but was postponed to the following day due to delays in arrivals for some of the Uganda players.)
16:30 UTC−1

Cape Verde	0–1	Uganda
	Report	Sserunkuma 83'

Estádio Nacional de Cabo Verde, Praia
Referee: Ali Lemghaifry (Mauritania)

8 September 2018
16:00 UTC+3

Uganda	0–0	Tanzania
	Report

Mandela National Stadium, Kira
Referee: Eric Otogo-Castane (Gabon)
9 September 2018
15:00 UTC+2

Lesotho	1–1	Cape Verde
Motebang 70'	Report	Djaniny 75'

Setsoto Stadium, Maseru
Referee: Mehdi Abid Charef (Algeria)

12 October 2018
16:00 UTC−1

Cape Verde	3–0	Tanzania
Gomes 16', 23'; Stopira 84'	Report

Estádio Nacional de Cabo Verde, Praia
Referee: Boubou Traoré (Mali)
13 October 2018
16:00 UTC+3

Uganda	3–0	Lesotho
Okwi 11', 64'; Miya 37' (pen.)	Report

Mandela National Stadium, Kira
Referee: Amin Mohamed Omar (Egypt)

16 October 2018
17:00 UTC+3

Tanzania	2–0	Cape Verde
Msuva 29'; Samatta 57'	Report

National Stadium, Dar es Salaam
Referee: Souleiman Ahmed Djama (Djibouti)
16 October 2018
18:00 UTC+2

Lesotho	0–2	Uganda
	Report	Miya 5', 35'

Setsoto Stadium, Maseru
Referee: Ali Adelaïd (Comoros)

17 November 2018
16:00 UTC+3

Uganda	1–0	Cape Verde
Kaddu 77'	Report

Mandela National Stadium, Kira
Referee: Youssef Essrayri (Tunisia)
18 November 2018
16:00 UTC+2

Lesotho	1–0	Tanzania
Lerotholi 76'	Report

Setsoto Stadium, Maseru
Referee: Thierry Nkurunziza (Burundi)

24 March 2019
18:00 UTC+3

Tanzania	3–0	Uganda
Msuva 21'; Nyoni 51' (pen.); Morris 57'	Report

National Stadium, Dar es Salaam
Referee: Eric Otogo-Castane (Gabon)
24 March 2019
14:00 UTC−1

Cape Verde	0–0	Lesotho
	Report

Estádio Nacional de Cabo Verde, Praia
Referee: Mahamadou Keita (Mali)

== Goalscorers ==
There were 20 goals scored in 12 matches, for an average of 1.67 goals per match.

3 goals

- (Uganda) Farouk Miya

2 goals

- (Cape Verde) Ricardo Gomes
- (Tanzania) Simon Msuva
- (Tanzania) Mbwana Samatta
- (Uganda) Emmanuel Okwi

1 goal

- (Cape Verde) Djaniny
- (Cape Verde) Stopira
- (Lesotho) Nkau Lerotholi
- (Lesotho) Sera Motebang
- (Lesotho) Thapelo Tale
- (Tanzania) Aggrey Morris
- (Tanzania) Erasto Nyoni
- (Uganda) Patrick Kaddu
- (Uganda) Geoffrey Sserunkuma
