= Teah Dennis Jr. =

Liberian association football player

Teah Baysah Dennis
Personal information
- Full name: Teah Baysah Dennis
- Date of birth: 5 July 1992 (age 34)
- Place of birth: Monrovia, Liberia
- Height: 6 ft 2 in (1.88 m)
- Position: Defender

Youth career
- 2005–2007: LPRC Oilers

Senior career*
Years	Team	Apps	(Gls)
2011–2017	BYC FC	83	(5)
2014–2016	→ Al-Ahli (loan)	60	(0)
2016–17	→ Sarawak (loan)	7	(0)
2017–18	Al-Ahli	6	(0)
2017–2019	Al-Hussein		
2019–2020	Punjab F.C.	10	(0)

International career^{‡}
2006–2007	Liberia U19	3	(0)
2007–2009	Liberia U23	11	(0)
2009–2019	Liberia	37	(1)
- * Club domestic league appearances and goals as of 14 January 2017 ‡ National team caps and goals as of 17:50, 9 September 2019 (UTC)

Teah Baysah Dennis (born 5 July 1992) is a Liberian former professional footballer who played as a defender.

== Background ==
Teah Dennis Jr., born in Liberia, began his playing career with LPRC Oilers FC in Monrovia. He was then transferred to one of the country's biggest clubs, Barrack Young Controllers Football Club, where he established himself as a key player.

After several seasons with Barrack Young Controllers, Dennis moved to Jordanian club Al-Ahli in 2014 on a two-year loan deal. On 1 July 2016, he again went on a loan deal, this time to Malaysian outfit Sarawak. After permanently moving back to Al-Ahli in 2017, he transferred to rival Jordanian club Al-Hussein the following year before eventually landing at Indian club Minerva Punjab FC at the beginning of the 2019 season. He also played for Calcutta Football League side Southern Samity.

== Honors ==
Barrack Young Controllers

- Liberian Premier League: 2013, 2014
- Liberian Cup: 2013

Al-Ahli

- Jordan FA Cup: 2015–16

Liberia

- WAFU Nations Cup: 3rd place 2011

== Career statistics ==
=== International goals ===
Scores and results list Liberia's goal tally first.

No.	Date	Venue	Opponent	Score	Result	Competition
1.	16 October 2018	Samuel Kanyon Doe Sports Complex, Monrovia, Liberia	Congo	1–0	2–1	2019 Africa Cup of Nations qualification
