= Gerald Phiri Jr. =

Malawian professional footballer (born 1993)

Personal information
- Full name: Gerald Keith Phiri Junior
- Date of birth: 8 June 1993 (age 33)
- Place of birth: Blantyre, Malawi
- Height: 1.83 m (6 ft 0 in)
- Position: Attacking midfielder

Senior career*
Years	Team	Apps	(Gls)
2011–2013	Mighty Wanderers		
2013–2015	CAPS United		
2015–2018	Bidvest Wits	6	(1)
2015	→ Township Rollers (loan)		
2016–2017	→ Platinum Stars (loan)	16	(2)
2018	→ Platinum Stars (loan)	10	(2)
2019	Ajax Cape Town	8	(0)
2019–2021	Baroka	46	(4)
2021–2023	Al-Hilal Club		

International career^{‡}
2015–	Malawi	51	(11)
- * Club domestic league appearances and goals as of 15 December 2024 ‡ National team caps and goals as of 15 December 2024

Gerald Keith Phiri Jr. is a Malawian professional footballer who last played as a midfielder for Sudan Premier League club Al-Hilal Club and the Malawi national team. He is the son of Malawian football manager Gerald Phiri Sr.

He signed for South African clubs Bidvest Wits F.C. in 2015 from Zimbabwean teams CAPS United.

He was named in the Malawi national team for the 2015 COSAFA Cup in South Africa, making his debut against Mozambique national team at the quarter-final stage.

== International goals ==
Scores and results list Malawi's goal tally first.

No	Date	Venue	Opponent	Score	Result	Competition
1.	22 May 2015	Mogwase Stadium, Rustenburg, South Africa	South Africa	1–2	1–2	Friendly
2.	6 September 2015	Somhlolo National Stadium, Lobamba, Swaziland	Swaziland	1–0	2–2	2017 Africa Cup of Nations qualification
3.	25 November 2015	Bahir Dar Stadium, Bahir Dar, Ethiopia	Djibouti	1–0	3–0	2015 CECAFA Cup
4.	4 September 2016	Kamuzu Stadium, Blantyre, Malawi	Swaziland	1–0	1–0	2017 Africa Cup of Nations qualification
5.	10 June 2017	Bingu National Stadium, Lilongwe, Malawi	Comoros	1–0	1–0	2019 Africa Cup of Nations qualification
6.	26 May 2019	King Zwelithini Stadium, Umlazi, South Africa	Seychelles	3–0	3–0	2019 COSAFA Cup
7.	28 May 2019	King Zwelithini Stadium, Umlazi, South Africa	Namibia	2–1	2–1	2019 COSAFA Cup
8.	2 June 2019	Princess Magogo Stadium, KwaMashu, South Africa	Zambia	2–0	2–2 (2–4 p)	2019 COSAFA Cup
9.	10 September 2019	Kamuzu Stadium, Blantyre, Malawi	Botswana	1–0	1–0	2022 FIFA World Cup qualification
10.	12 November 2020	Stade du 4 Août, Ouagadougou, Burkina Faso	Burkina Faso	1–2	1–3	2021 Africa Cup of Nations qualification
11.	24 March 2021	Al-Hilal Stadium, Omdurman, Sudan	South Sudan	1–0	1–0	2021 Africa Cup of Nations qualification
