= Njiva Rakotoharimalala =

Malagasy footballer (born 1992)

Personal information
- Full name: Njiva Tsilavina Martin Rakotoharimalala
- Date of birth: 6 August 1992 (age 34)
- Place of birth: Antananarivo, Madagascar
- Height: 1.80 m (5 ft 11 in)
- Positions: Winger; forward

Team information
- Current team: Ratchaburi
- Number: 89

Senior career*
Years	Team	Apps	(Gls)
2011–2017	CNaPS Sport	76	(44)
2018	Ratchaburi	3	(1)
2018	→ Sukhothai (loan)	28	(11)
2019	Samut Sakhon City	11	(8)
2019	Fleury	5	(2)
2020	Nongbua Pitchaya	12	(8)
2022–2023	Al-Jandal	24	(12)
2023–	Ratchaburi	42	(26)

International career^{‡}
2014–	Madagascar	57	(14)
- * Club domestic league appearances and goals as of 24 December 2025 ‡ National team caps and goals as of 12 October 2025

Njiva Tsilavina Martin Rakotoharimalala (born 6 August 1992) is a Malagasy footballer who plays as a winger or a forward for Thai club Ratchaburi and the Madagascar national football team.

== Career statistics ==
=== International ===
As of match played 20 November 2023

Madagascar
Year	Apps	Goals
2014	1	0
2015	13	4
2016	2	0
2017	7	4
2018	6	1
2019	9	0
2021	6	2
2022	2	1
2023	4	2
Total	50	14

==== International goals ====
Scores and results list Madagascar's goal tally first.

No.	Date	Venue	Opponent	Score	Result	Competition
1.	20 May 2015	Royal Bafokeng Stadium, Phokeng, South Africa	Tanzania	1–0	2–0	2015 COSAFA Cup
2.	4 August 2015	Stade Michel Volnay, Saint-Pierre, Réunion	Maldives	3–0	4–0	2015 Indian Ocean Island Games
3.	10 October 2015	Mahamasina Municipal Stadium, Antananarivo, Madagascar	Central African Republic	2–0	3–0	2018 FIFA World Cup qualification
4.	13 November 2015	Mahamasina Municipal Stadium, Antananarivo, Madagascar	Senegal	2–0	2–2	2018 FIFA World Cup qualification
5.	29 April 2017	Bingu National Stadium, Lilongwe, Malawi	Malawi	1–0	1–0	2018 African Nations Championship qualification
6.	16 July 2017	Mahamasina Municipal Stadium, Antananarivo, Madagascar	Mozambique	1–1	2–2	2018 African Nations Championship qualification
7.	16 July 2017	Mahamasina Municipal Stadium, Antananarivo, Madagascar	Mozambique	2–1	2–2	2018 African Nations Championship qualification
8.	23 July 2017	Estádio do Zimpeto, Maputo, Mozambique	Mozambique	2–0	2–0	2018 African Nations Championship qualification
9.	16 October 2018	Vontovorona Stadium, Antananarivo, Madagascar	Equatorial Guinea	1–0	1–0	2019 Africa Cup of Nations qualification
10.	7 September 2021	National Stadium, Dar es Salaam, Tanzania	Tanzania	1–2	2–3	2022 FIFA World Cup qualification
11.	10 October 2021	Mahamasina Municipal Stadium, Antananarivo, Madagascar	DR Congo	1–0	1–0	2022 FIFA World Cup qualification
12.	5 June 2022	Mahamasina Municipal Stadium, Antananarivo, Madagascar	Angola	1–0	1–1	2023 Africa Cup of Nations qualification
13.	20 November 2023	Stade Municipal d'Oujda, Oujda, Morocco	Chad	1–0	3–0	2026 FIFA World Cup qualification
14.	20 November 2023	Stade Municipal d'Oujda, Oujda, Morocco	Chad	2–0	3–0	2026 FIFA World Cup qualification

== Honours ==
CNaPS Sport

- THB Champions League: 2013, 2014, 2015, 2016, 2017
- Coupe de Madagascar: 2011, 2015, 2016
- Coupe des clubs champions de l'océan Indien: 2012, 2014, 2015

Madagascar

- COSAFA CUP 2015 third place: 2015

Individual

- THB Champions League Best Player: 2014
- THB Champions League top scorer: 2014
- Best squad France Football week international: 2018

Award

- Knight Order of Madagascar: 2019
