= Raphael Dwamena =

Ghanaian footballer (1995–2023)

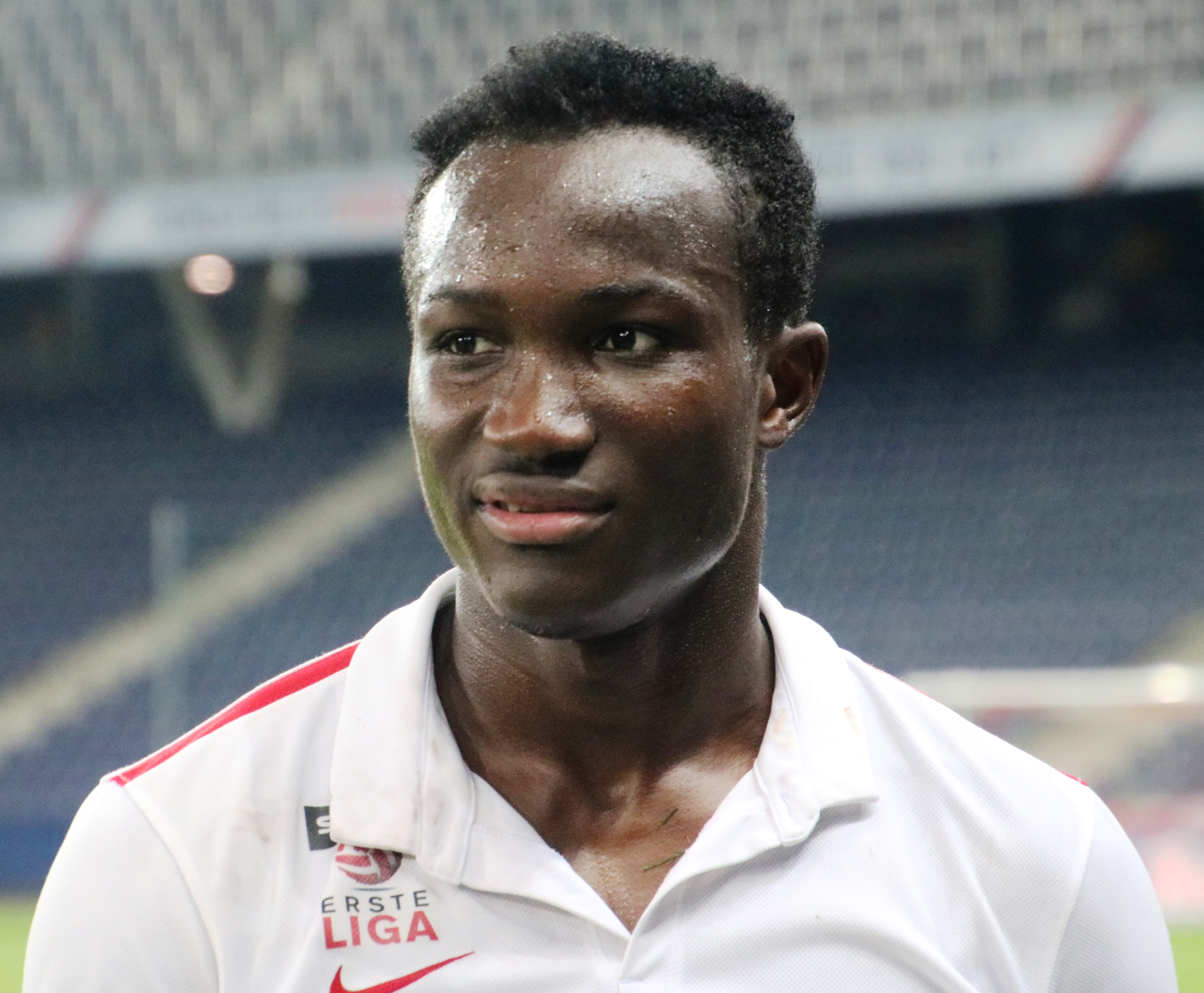
- Dwamena in 2016

Personal information
- Date of birth: 12 September 1995
- Place of birth: Nkawkaw, Ghana
- Date of death: 11 November 2023 (aged 28)
- Place of death: Kavajë, Albania
- Height: 1.84 m (6 ft 0 in)
- Position: Forward

Youth career
- 2011–2014: Red Bull Ghana
- 2014: Red Bull Salzburg

Senior career*
Years	Team	Apps	(Gls)
2014–2016	Red Bull Salzburg	0	(0)
2014–2016	→ Liefering (loan)	27	(6)
2016–2017	Austria Lustenau	20	(18)
2017–2018	Zürich	51	(21)
2018–2020	Levante	12	(0)
2019–2020	→ Zaragoza (loan)	9	(2)
2020	Vejle BK	5	(2)
2021–2022	Blau-Weiß Linz	3	(0)
2022	Old Boys	11	(8)
2023	Egnatia	29	(20)
Total		167	(77)

International career
2017–2018	Ghana	9	(2)
- * Club domestic league appearances and goals

Raphael Dwamena (12 September 1995 – 11 November 2023) was a Ghanaian professional footballer who played as a forward for Albanian club Egnatia in the Kategoria Superiore and the Ghana national team.

== Club career ==
=== Early years ===
Born in Nkawkaw, Dwamena played and trained with the Red Bull Ghana developmental program. He helped the RB Ghana U17 team to a silver medal at the 2013 International Tournament in Croix, France, and was named the player of the tournament. Before returning to Ghana, Dwamena and his teammate, David Atanga, first travelled to Austria for a one-week trial with Red Bull Salzburg.

Dwamena joined the Salzburg youth team in January 2014, and immediately made an impact on the U18 squad. In one tournament in June, he racked up seven goals in four games. Although Salzburg finished in third, he won the Golden Shoe.

=== FC Liefering ===
In July 2014, Dwamena was promoted to FC Liefering, the Salzburg farm team playing in the Austrian Football First League. He made his professional debut on 18 July, where in the 82nd minute of a 3–0 win over Hartberg he was substituted in for Nikola Dovedan. He was one of six Liefering players making their professional debuts that day. He played in one more game that season.

During the 2015–16 season, Dwamena made his first start for Liefering on 21 August against Wiener Neustadt. He played the 90 minutes in place of Smail Prevljak. On 18 September, in his fifth straight start, he scored his first professional goal. He scored in a 4–1 win over Austria Klagenfurt.

=== Austria Lustenau ===
Dwamena enjoyed a successful half-season with Austria Lustenau, scoring 18 goals in 20 games, before his transfer to FC Zürich.

=== FC Zürich ===
Raphael Dwamena completed a transfer to FC Zürich on 27 January 2017. He made an immediate impact at his new club by scoring 12 goals in 18 matches, helping Zürich to win the 2016–17 Swiss Challenge League and gain promotion to the Swiss Super League.

On his Swiss Super League debut, Dwamena scored two goals against Grasshoppers.

On 21 August 2017, Zürich agreed a fee with Premier League club Brighton & Hove Albion for the transfer of Dwamena. He was set to join Brighton subject to passing a medical, obtaining a work permit and international clearance, The deal fell through after Dwamena failed his medical due to a heart condition. He instead, remained an FC Zürich player.

=== Levante and loan to Zaragoza ===
On 7 August 2018, Dwamena signed a four-year contract with La Liga side Levante UD. The following 16 July, he was loaned out to Segunda División club Real Zaragoza for one year.

In October 2019, after new examinations were carried out on his heart condition, the doctors recommended his immediate withdrawal and retirement from football. He returned with an implantable cardioverter-defibrillator in January 2020.

=== Vejle ===
On 20 August 2020, Dwamena moved to Vejle Boldklub in the Danish Superliga. He scored in his debut in the Superliga, as Vejle lost 4–2 to rivals AGF. He was withdrawn from team activities after complications of his heart condition were detected before a Superliga match against AaB. At that point, he had made five league appearances for the newly promoted Superliga club and scored twice.

Due to his heart condition and some worrying measurements, Vejle confirmed on 26 October 2020, that Dwamena could not play for a period. In November 2020, the club's sporting director stated that he had played his last game for the club.

=== Return to Austria ===
On 25 June 2021, Dwamena returned to Austria and signed a two-year contract with Blau-Weiß Linz. On 28 October 2021, he collapsed on the field during an Austrian Cup game against TSV Hartberg as the game was abandoned. He recovered in the hospital, and his career in Austria was over.

=== BSC Old Boys ===
During September 2022, Dwamena returned to football signing with Swiss fifth-tier side BSC Old Boys. On 3 September 2022, he scored on his debut in a 2–1 win over FC Regensdorf.

=== Egnatia ===
In December 2022, Dwamena joined Albanian side Egnatia as a free agent. He signed a year and half contract which was later extended to two years. On 13 July 2023, Dwamena scored his first two goals in European competitions, scoring a brace for Egnatia in a 4–4 draw with FC Ararat-Armenia in a UEFA Conference League match.

== International career ==
Dwamena did not play for the youth national teams of his country Ghana. He was called into the senior team as part of the 30-man squad for the 2017 African Cup of Nations but was dropped from the 23-man squad.

Dwamena made his international debut on 11 June 2017 in an African Cup of Nations qualifier against Ethiopia, where he scored a brace to mark the new era of youngsters being introduced into the national team.

== Personal life ==
Dwamena was diagnosed with a ventricular arrhythmia in 2017. In January 2020, while at Levante UD he had an implantable cardioverter-defibrillator (ICD) implanted through surgery, which enabled his club to monitor his heart during matches. In October 2020, the ICD showed values which were considered too high, and his club at the time, Vejle Boldklub, withdrew him from team activities as a result.

In October 2021, in Austrian Cup match during the first half of Blau-Weiss Linz's game against Hartberg, Dwamena collapsed on pitch, was shocked by the ICD and stabilized quickly.

=== Death ===
On 11 November 2023, Dwamena collapsed into sudden cardiac arrest on the field in the 23rd minute of the first half of the round 13 match between Egnatia and Partizani in the Kategoria Superiore, and died on the way to Kavajë Hospital, aged 28. Afterward, all sports events in Albania were postponed or suspended. His cardiologist later disclosed that he had elected to remove his ICD a year prior. He was laid to rest on 16 February 2024 on a football pitch in Accra, Ghana.

== Career statistics ==
=== Club ===
Appearances and goals by club, season and competition
Club	Season	League			National cup (Note: Includes Austrian Cup, Swiss Cup, Copa del Rey, Albanian Cup)		Continental		Total	
Club	Season	Division	Apps	Goals	Apps	Goals	Apps	Goals	Apps	Goals
Liefering	2014–15	Austrian First League	2	0	0	0	–		2	0
Liefering	2015–16	Austrian First League	25	6	0	0	–		25	6
Liefering	Total		27	6	0	0	–		27	6
Austria Lustenau	2016–17	Austrian First League	20	18	2	3	–		22	21
Zürich	2016–17	Swiss Challenge League	18	12	1	0	–		19	12
Zürich	2017–18	Swiss Super League	32	9	4	4	–		36	13
Zürich	2018–19	Swiss Super League	1	0	0	0	–		1	0
Zürich	Total		51	21	5	4	–		56	25
Levante	2018–19	La Liga	12	0	3	1	–		15	1
Zaragoza	2019–20	Segunda División	9	2	0	0	–		9	2
Vejle	2020–21	Danish Superliga	5	2	0	0	–		5	2
Blau-Weiß Linz	2021–22	Austrian Second League	3	0	0	0	–		3	0
BSC Old Boys	2022–23	2. Liga Interregional	11	8	0	0	–		11	8
Egnatia	2022–23	Kategoria Superiore	18	11	6	1	–		24	12
Egnatia	2023–24	Kategoria Superiore	11	9	0	0	2 (Note: Appearances in UEFA Europa Conference League)	3	13	12
Egnatia	Total		29	20	6	1	2	3	37	24
Career total			167	77	16	9	2	3	185	89

=== International ===
Appearances and goals by national team and year
National team	Year	Apps	Goals
Ghana	2017	3	2
Total		3	2

Scores and results list Ghana's goal tally first, score column indicates score after each Dwamena goal.

List of international goals scored by Raphael Dwamena
No.	Date	Venue	Opponent	Score	Result	Competition
1	11 June 2017	Baba Yara Stadium, Kumasi, Ghana	Ethiopia	4–0	5–0	2019 Africa Cup of Nations qualification
2	11 June 2017	Baba Yara Stadium, Kumasi, Ghana	Ethiopia	5–0	5–0	2019 Africa Cup of Nations qualification

== Honours ==
FC Zurich

- Swiss Cup: 2017–18
- Swiss Challenge League: 2016–17

KF Egnatia

- Kategoria Superiore: 2023–24
- Albanian Cup: 2022–23
