= Seif Teiri =

Sudanese footballer

Personal information
- Full name: Seifeldin Malek Bakhit Makki
- Date of birth: 1 January 1994 (age 32)
- Height: 1.84 m (6 ft 0 in)
- Position: Striker

Senior career*
Years	Team	Apps	(Gls)
2015	Al-Hilal		
2016–2018	Khartoum		
2018–2021	Al-Merrikh		
2021–2025	Pharco	51	(6)
2025–2026	Al-Nasr SC (Benghazi)	5	(1)

International career^{‡}
2017–	Sudan	44	(10)
Medal record
Men's football
Representing Sudan
African Nations Championship
Third place	2018 Morocco
- * Club domestic league appearances and goals ‡ National team caps and goals as of 14 October 2025

Seif Teiri (born 1 January 1994) is a Sudanese footballer that currently plays for the Sudan national team.

== Club career ==
In 2019 Teiri joined Al-Merrikh of the Sudan Premier League. In September 2021 it was announced that he had signed a three-year contract with Pharco FC of the Egyptian Premier League.

== International career ==
Teiri made his senior international debut on 9 June 2017 in a 2019 Africa Cup of Nations qualification match against Madagascar.

=== International goals ===
Scores and results list Sudan's goal tally first.

No	Date	Venue	Opponent	Score	Result	Competition
1.	29 July 2017	Al-Ubayyid Stadium, El-Obeid, Sudan	Burundi	1–0	1–0	2018 African Nations Championship qualification
2.	7 August 2017	Nyamirambo Regional Stadium, Kigali, Rwanda	Rwanda	1–1	1–2	Friendly
3.	13 August 2017	Hawassa Kenema Stadium, Hawassa, Ethiopia	Ethiopia	1–0	1–1	2018 African Nations Championship qualification
4.	14 January 2018	Stade Mohammed V, Casablanca, Morocco	Guinea	2–1	2–1	2018 African Nations Championship
5.	27 January 2018	Marrakesh Stadium, Marrakesh, Morocco	Zambia	1–0	1–0	2018 African Nations Championship
6.	22 March 2019	Al-Hilal Stadium, Omdurman, Sudan	Equatorial Guinea	1–0	1–4	2019 Africa Cup of Nations qualification
7.	24 March 2021	Estádio Nacional 12 de Julho, São Tomé, São Tomé and Príncipe	São Tomé and Príncipe	1–0	2–0	2021 Africa Cup of Nations qualification
8.	28 March 2021	Al-Hilal Stadium, Omdurman, Sudan	South Africa	1–0	2–0	2021 Africa Cup of Nations qualification
9.	6 October 2021	Marrakesh Stadium, Marrakesh, Morocco	Guinea	1–1	1–1	2022 FIFA World Cup qualification
10.	6 June 2024	Stade Cheikha Ould Boïdiya, Nouakchott, Mauritania	Mauritania	1–0	2–0	2026 FIFA World Cup qualification
Last updated 6 June 2024

=== International career statistics ===
As of match played 6 June 2024

Sudan national team
Year	Apps	Goals
2017	6	3
2018	9	2
2019	1	1
2020	3	0
2021	7	3
2023	5	0
2024	1	1
Total	32	10

== Honours ==
Sudan

- African Nations Championship: 3rd place, 2018
