= Kabongo Kasongo =

DR Congolese footballer (born 1994)

Personal information
- Date of birth: 18 July 1994 (age 32)
- Place of birth: Kinshasa, Zaire
- Height: 1.85 m (6 ft 1 in)
- Position: Forward

Youth career
- 2013-2014: FC Sion

Senior career*
Years	Team	Apps	(Gls)
2014–2016	AS Kaloum	30	(12)
2016–2017	Al Ittihad	23	(12)
2017–2021	Zamalek	42	(13)
2019	→ Al Wehda (loan)	10	(4)
2019	→ Wydad Casablanca (loan)	0	(0)
2021–2022	Boluspor	39	(17)
2022–2024	Sakaryaspor	56	(27)
2024–2025	Çorum	11	(0)

International career^{‡}
2018	DR Congo	2	(1)
- * Club domestic league appearances and goals as of 26 August 2025 ‡ National team caps and goals as of 14 March 2026

Kabongo Kasongo (born 18 July 1994) is a DR Congolese professional footballer.

== Club career ==
On 13 June 2017, Kasongo moved from Al Ittihad to Zamalek for a fee of $830,000.

In July 2016, he had a short trial at Saint-Étienne, but they did not give him a contract and his Visa in France expired, forcing him to join Al Ittihad one month later.

== International career ==
Kasongo made his debut for DR Congo national team on 18 November 2018 in an African Cup of Nations qualifier against Congo and scored a goal on his debut in a 1–1 draw.

== Career statistics ==
Scores and results list DR Congo's goal tally first.

No.	Date	Venue	Opponent	Score	Result	Competition
1.	18 November 2018	Stade Alphonse Massemba-Débat, Brazzaville, Congo	Congo	1–0	1–1	2019 Africa Cup of Nations qualification

== Honours ==
Zamalek

- Egypt Cup: 2017–18
- Egyptian Super Cup: 2019–20
- Saudi-Egyptian Super Cup: 2018
- CAF Confederation Cup: 2018–19
- CAF Super Cup: 2020
