= Pape Abou Cissé =

Senegalese footballer (born 1995)

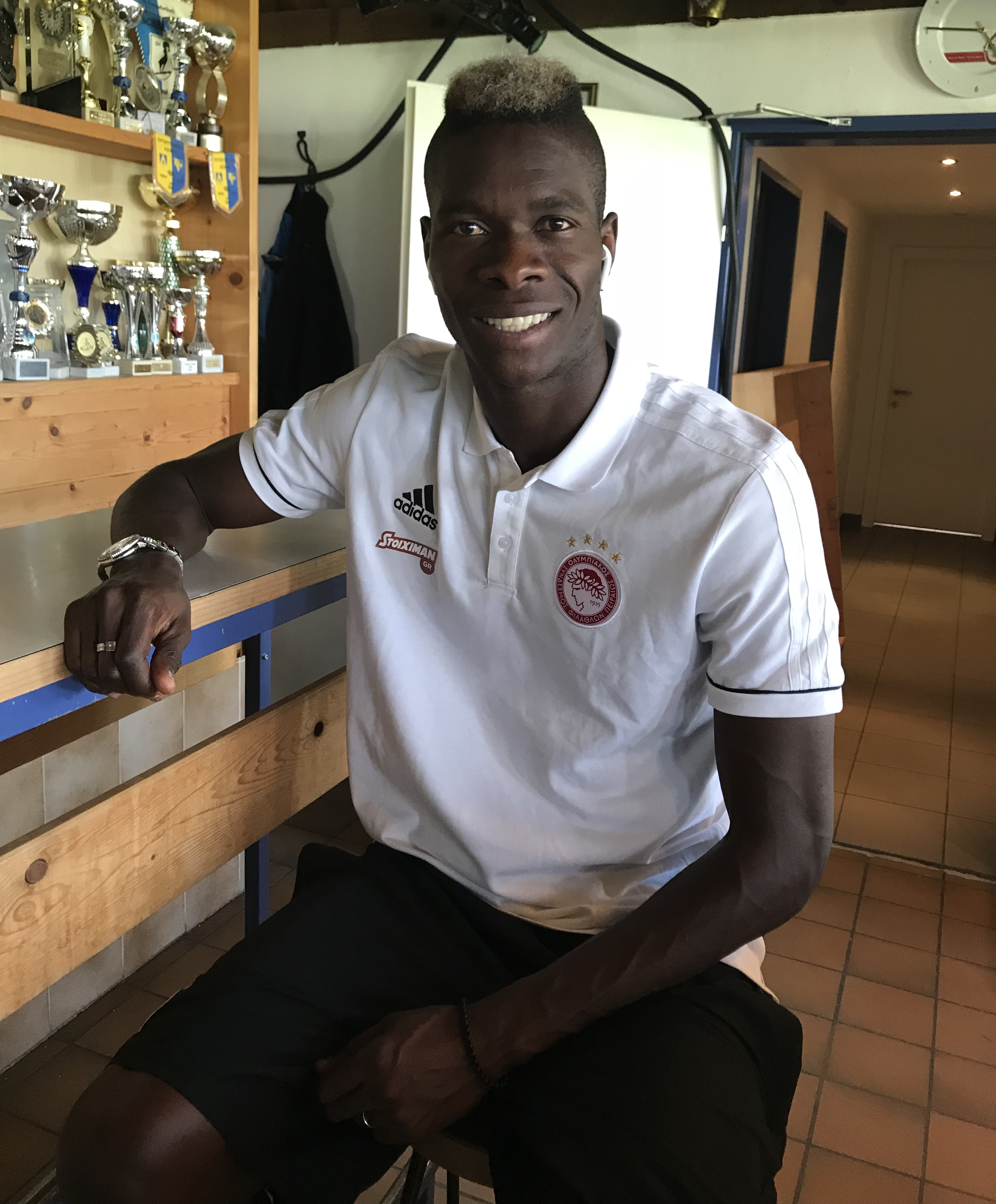
- Cissé with Olympiacos in 2018

Personal information
- Full name: Pape Abou Cissé
- Date of birth: 14 September 1995 (age 31)
- Place of birth: Pikine, Senegal
- Height: 1.97 m (6 ft 6 in)
- Position: Center-back

Youth career
- 2012–2014: AS Pikine

Senior career*
Years	Team	Apps	(Gls)
2013–2014	AS Pikine	4	(0)
2014–2017	Ajaccio	71	(1)
2017–2023	Olympiacos	92	(10)
2021	→ Saint-Étienne (loan)	14	(0)
2023–2024	Adana Demirspor	13	(0)
2024–2025	Al Shamal	3	(0)
2026	Vestri	0	(0)

International career
2015	Senegal U20	2	(0)
2018–2022	Senegal	16	(1)
Medal record
Men's football
Representing Senegal
Africa Cup of Nations
Winner	2021 Cameroon
Runner-up	2019 Egypt
African U-20 Championship
Runner-up	2015 Senegal
- * Club domestic league appearances and goals as of 28 November 2025

Pape Abou Cissé (born 14 September 1995) is a Senegalese professional footballer who plays as a center-back.

== Club career ==
=== Early career ===
A youth international for Senegal, he is a youth product of AS Pikine. After a trial, Cissé joined Ajaccio in early 2015 as a trainee professional. He made his professional debut in a Ligue 2 draw against Valenciennes in April 2015, playing the entire game. He went on to make 71 appearances in the French second tier.

=== Olympiacos ===
In 2017, he joined Olympiacos as a pre-contract signing. On 14 October 2017, he scored his first goal with Olympiacos, after an assist from Kostas Fortounis in a 4–3 away win against Panionios. Benfica were reportedly interested in signing the player in the January 2018 transfer window.

Cissé scored an injury-time equaliser for Olympiacos against Panathiniakos in the first derby of the 2018–19 Super League Greece season. He was included in UEFA's Europa League Breakthrough Team for 2018: the citation described him as having a "towering presence in the Olympiacos back line, allied to deceptive pace and a great awareness [and] also a threat from set pieces."

On 12 February 2020, Cissé scored a quick-fire double to quash Lamia's stubborn challenge and secure Olympiacos' qualification to the Greek Cup semi-finals, in a thrilling 3–2 home win game. Later that month, on 27 February, he scored with a stooping header from a corner-kick, when French international Mathieu Valbuena curling over a dangerous delivery into the heart of the Arsenal's penalty area in a glorious 2–1 away win in London for the Europa League round of 32, 2nd leg. He has been included in the Europa League Team of the Week.

==== Loan to Saint-Étienne ====
On 30 January 2021, Senegalese international defender Cissé was loaned out to Saint-Étienne with an option to buy. The former player of AS Pikine has the opportunity to bounce back in a historic French club which can keep him against €13 million.

==== Return to Olympiacos ====
On 19 August 2021, Cissé scored a goal against Slovan Bratislava, sealing a 3–0 home win in the Europa League playoffs, 1st leg. On 4 December 2021, with two goals by Cissé, Olympiacos defeated OFI at the Theodoros Vardinogiannis Stadium, sealing a vital away win in his club's effort to win the championship. On 12 December 2021, he was the only scorer after Rony Lopes's assist in a 1–0 home win game against Aris.

=== Adana Demirspor ===
On 15 September 2023, Cissé joined Turkish Süper Lig club Adana Demirspor.

== International career ==
Cissé represented the Senegal U20s at the 2015 African U-20 Championship in 2015.

On 24 August 2018, he received his first senior call-up, for the 2019 Africa Cup of Nations qualifier match against Madagascar on 9 September 2018. He made his senior debut on 13 October 2018, in another qualifier at home to Sudan, and scored the only goal of the match. Cissé's performances in the 2021 Africa Cup of Nations, after replacing Napoli star Kalidou Koulibaly who had tested positive for coronavirus, in the Lions of Teranga's first two Afcon matches against Zimbabwe and Guinea attracted the interest of many European clubs.

He was appointed a Grand Officer of the National Order of the Lion by President of Senegal Macky Sall following the nation's victory at the 2021 Africa Cup of Nations.

== Career statistics ==
=== Club ===
As of match played 5 April 2023

Appearances and goals by club, season and competition
Club	Season	League			National Cup		League Cup		Continental		Total	
Club	Season	Division	Apps	Goals	Apps	Goals	Apps	Goals	Apps	Goals	Apps	Goals
Ajaccio	2014–15	Ligue 2	9	0	0	0	0	0	—		9	0
Ajaccio	2015–16	Ligue 2	32	0	1	0	2	0	—		35	0
Ajaccio	2016–17	Ligue 2	30	1	0	0	1	0	—		31	1
Ajaccio	Total		71	1	1	0	3	0	—		75	1
Olympiacos	2017–18	Super League Greece	17	4	4	0	—		0	0	21	4
Olympiacos	2018–19	Super League Greece	19	1	2	0	—		8 (Note: Appearances in UEFA Europa League)	1	29	2
Olympiacos	2019–20	Super League Greece	13	0	6	2	—		4	1	23	3
Olympiacos	2020–21	Super League Greece	12	0	1	1	—		6	0	19	1
Olympiacos	2021–22	Super League Greece	25	5	2	0	—		13	1	40	6
Olympiacos	2022–23	Super League Greece	6	0	3	1	—		10	0	19	1
Olympiacos	Total		92	10	18	4	—		41	3	151	17
Saint-Étienne (Ioan)	2020–21	Ligue 1	14	0	1	0	0	0	—		15	0
Career total			177	11	20	4	3	0	41	3	241	18

=== International ===
As of matches played on 2 February 2022

Appearances and goals by national team and year
National team	Year	Apps	Goals
Senegal	2018	2	1
Senegal	2019	1	0
Senegal	2020	1	0
Senegal	2021	2	0
Senegal	2022	3	0
Total		9	1

Scores and results list Senegal's goal tally first, score column indicates score after each Cissé goal.

List of international goals scored by Pape Abou Cissé
No.	Date	Venue	Opponent	Score	Result	Competition
1	13 October 2018	Stade Léopold Sédar Senghor, Dakar, Senegal	Sudan	1–0	3–0	2019 Africa Cup of Nations qualification

== Honours ==
Olympiacos

- Super League Greece: 2019–20, 2021–22
- Greek Cup: 2019–20

Senegal

- Africa Cup of Nations: 2021; runner-up: 2019

Senegal U20

- Africa U-20 Championship runner-up: 2015

Individual

- UEFA Europa League Breakthrough XI: 2018
- Super League Greece Player of the Month: December 2021
- Super League Greece Team of the Season: 2021–22

Orders

- Grand Officer of the National Order of the Lion: 2022
