= William Jebor =

Liberian footballer (born 1991)

Personal information
- Date of birth: 10 November 1991 (age 34)
- Place of birth: Monrovia, Liberia
- Height: 1.83 m (6 ft 0 in)
- Position: Striker

Team information
- Current team: Al-Ramadi

Youth career
- LISCR

Senior career*
Years	Team	Apps	(Gls)
2008–2009	LPRC Oilers	10	(14)
2009–2010	Taliya	15	(14)
2010–2011	Tersana	10	(8)
2011–2012	Eastern Company	14	(14)
2012–2014	Tala'ea El Gaish	14	(10)
2014	→ Al-Ahli Tripoli (loan)	8	(7)
2014–2017	Rio Ave	14	(1)
2015–2016	→ Ponferradina (loan)	17	(2)
2016–2017	→ Wydad Casablanca (loan)	34	(23)
2017–2018	Al Nassr FC	8	(3)
2018–2019	Wydad Casablanca	15	(3)
2019–2020	Al-Fujairah	12	(0)
2022–2023	Nõmme Kalju	10	(1)
2023	Valletta	9	(0)
2024	Al-Minaa	14	(7)
2024	Karbalaa		
2024–2025	Al-Quwa Al-Jawiya	11	(1)
2025–2026	Al-Hedod	36	(26)
2026–	Al-Ramadi		

International career^{‡}
2011–2026	Liberia	28	(13)
- * Club domestic league appearances and goals as of 19:42, 9 August 2026 (UTC) ‡ National team caps and goals as of 23:26, 31 March 2026 (UTC)

William Jebor (born 10 November 1991) is a Liberian professional footballer who plays as a striker for Iraqi Premier Division League club Al-Ramadi.

He is the second Liberian to be an Africa Footballer of the Year nominee, after George Weah, who won the prestigious award three times.

== Club career ==
Born in Monrovia, Jebor made his senior debut with LPRC Oilers in 2008, aged 17, after previously representing LISCR FC as a youth. In the summer of 2009, he moved abroad for the first time in his career, signing for Syrian Premier League side Taliya SC.

In 2010, Jebor switched teams and countries again, joining Egyptian Second Division club Tersana SC. After a short spell at Eastern Company, he moved to Tala'ea El Gaish in the Egyptian Premier League.

Jebor made his debut for the club on 3 February 2013, starting in a 1–0 away loss against Ismaily SC, and scored his first goal for the club on 12 March, netting the first in a 2–1 home win against El Mokawloon SC. He finished the campaign with ten goals, being tournament's topscorer; highlights included a hat-trick in a 3–2 home success over Ittihad El Shorta on 7 May.

In January 2014, Jebor switched clubs and countries again, after agreeing to a six-month loan deal with Al-Ahli Tripoli SC. On 5 August he signed a four-year contract with Portuguese side Rio Ave FC.

Jebor made his Primeira Liga debut on 13 September 2014, coming on as a second-half substitute for Renan Bressan in a 1–1 draw at Moreirense FC. He scored his first goal for the club on 30 April of the following year, netting his team's only in a 1–1 Taça de Portugal home draw against SC Braga.

On 28 July 2015, Jebor was loaned to SD Ponferradina in Spanish Segunda División, in a season-long deal.

In January 2023 Jebor signed a contract until the end of the season with Maltese Premier League side Valletta.

Jebor moved to Iraq Stars League club Al-Minaa in April 2024.

== International career ==
Jebor made his debut for Liberia on 26 March 2011, starting in a 4–2 loss against Cape Verde. His first international goal came on 14 June 2015, in a 2–1 defeat at Togo.

On 13 October 2015, Jebor scored a hat-trick in a 3–1 win at Guinea-Bissau, after scoring another one in the first leg. And he also scored another hat-trick against Djibouti in the African Cup of Nations Qualifier. On 29 March 2016, he scored another hat-trick in a CAF 2017 qualification match in Monrovia, Liberia, between Djibouti and Liberia, becoming the only Liberian senior national football team player to score a hat-trick more than once in an international tournament.

== Career statistics ==
=== International ===
As of matches played on 31 March 2026

Appearances and goals by national team and year
National team	Year	Apps	Goals
Liberia	2011	1	0
Liberia	2012	0	0
Liberia	2013	0	0
Liberia	2014	0	0
Liberia	2015	6	5
Liberia	2016	3	4
Liberia	2017	0	0
Liberia	2018	5	3
Liberia	2019	3	0
Liberia	2022	2	0
Liberia	2023	7	1
Liberia	2026	1	0
Total		28	13

As of 28 March 2023
Scores and results list Liberia's goal tally first, score column indicates score after each Jebor goal.

List of international goals scored by William Jebor
No.	Date	Venue	Opponent	Score	Result	Competition
1	14 June 2015	Stade de Kégué, Lomé, Togo	Togo	1–0	1–2	2017 Africa Cup of Nations qualification
2	8 October 2015	Antoinette Tubman Stadium, Monrovia, Liberia	Guinea-Bissau	1–0	1–1	2018 FIFA World Cup qualification
3	13 October 2015	Estadio 24 de Setembro, Bissau, Guinea-Bissau	Guinea-Bissau	1–0	3–1	2018 FIFA World Cup qualification
4	13 October 2015	Estadio 24 de Setembro, Bissau, Guinea-Bissau	Guinea-Bissau	2–0	3–1	2018 FIFA World Cup qualification
5	13 October 2015	Estadio 24 de Setembro, Bissau, Guinea-Bissau	Guinea-Bissau	3–1	3–1	2018 FIFA World Cup qualification
6	29 March 2016	Antoinette Tubman Stadium, Monrovia, Liberia	Djibouti	3–0	5–0	2017 Africa Cup of Nations qualification
7	29 March 2016	Antoinette Tubman Stadium, Monrovia, Liberia	Djibouti	4–0	5–0	2017 Africa Cup of Nations qualification
8	29 March 2016	Antoinette Tubman Stadium, Monrovia, Liberia	Djibouti	5–0	5–0	2017 Africa Cup of Nations qualification
9	5 June 2016	Antoinette Tubman Stadium, Monrovia, Liberia	Togo	2–0	2–2	2017 Africa Cup of Nations qualification
10	9 September 2018	Samuel Kanyon Doe Sports Complex, Monrovia, Liberia	DR Congo	1–0	1–1	2019 Africa Cup of Nations qualification
11	16 October 2018	Samuel Kanyon Doe Sports Complex, Monrovia, Liberia	Congo	2–0	2–1	2019 Africa Cup of Nations qualification
12	18 November 2018	Samuel Kanyon Doe Sports Complex, Monrovia, Liberia	Zimbabwe	1–0	1–0	2019 Africa Cup of Nations qualification
13	28 March 2023	Samuel Kanyon Doe Sports Complex, Monrovia, Liberia	South Africa	1–1	1–2	2023 Africa Cup of Nations qualification

== Honors ==
Wydad Casablanca

- Botola: 2016–17, 2018–19
- CAF Champions League: 2017, runner-up: 2018–19

Rio Ave

- Supertaça de Portugal runner-up:2014

Individual

- Botola top scorer: 2016–2017 (19 goals)
