= Nasser Chamed =

Comorian professional footballer (born 1993)

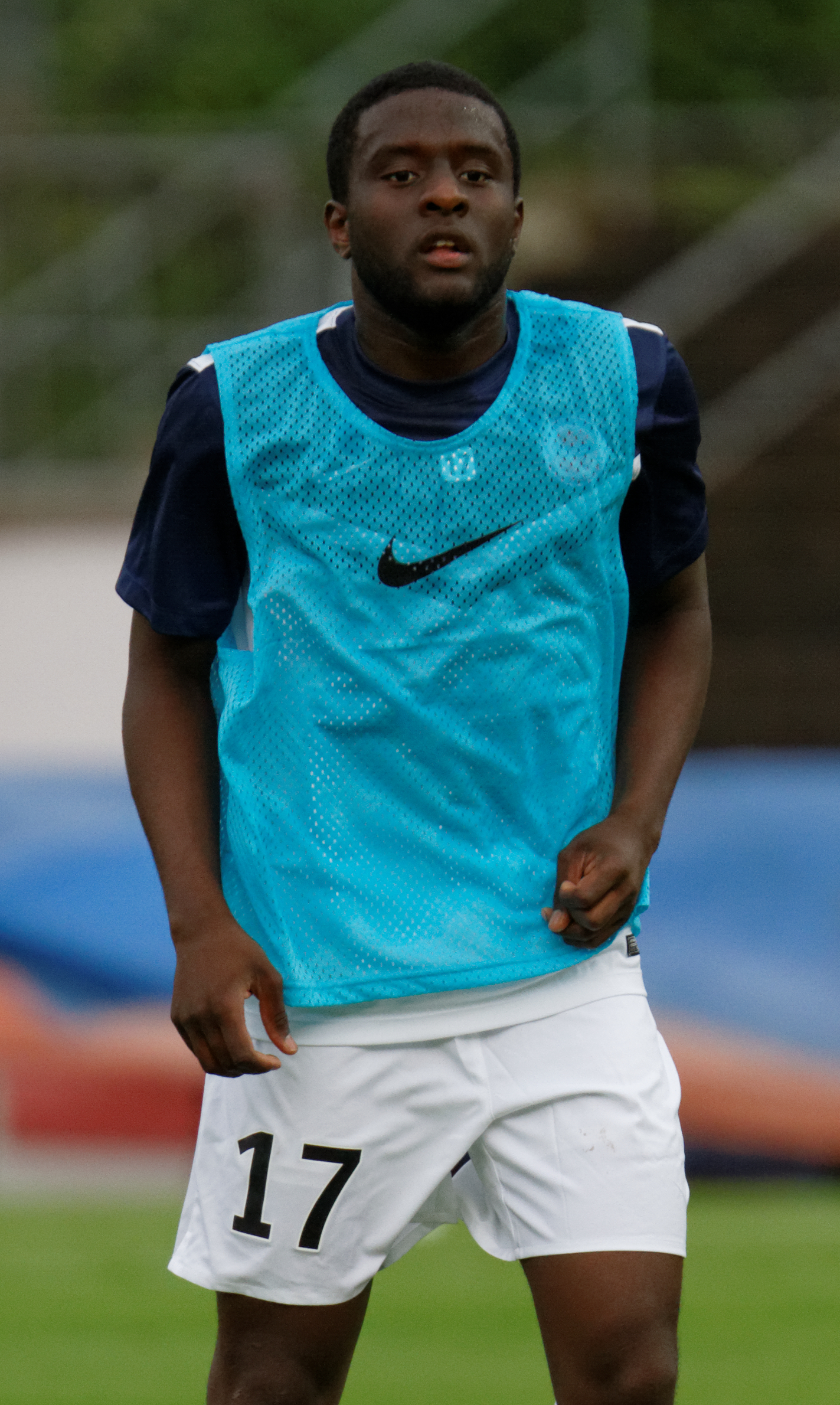
- Chamed with Châteauroux in 2014

Personal information
- Date of birth: 4 October 1993 (age 33)
- Place of birth: Lyon, France
- Height: 1.74 m (5 ft 9 in)
- Position: Winger

Youth career
- –2006: Lyon
- 2006–2008: CASCOL Oullins
- 2008–2012: Châteauroux

Senior career*
Years	Team	Apps	(Gls)
2010–2015	Châteauroux B	29	(6)
2012–2015	Châteauroux	61	(8)
2015–2017	Nîmes B	19	(3)
2015–2017	Nîmes	16	(0)
2017–2022	Gaz Metan Mediaș	142	(11)
2022–2024	Chindia Târgoviște	27	(3)
Total		294	(31)

International career
2015–2022	Comoros	25	(1)
- * Club domestic league appearances and goals

Nasser Chamed (born 4 October 1993) is a former professional footballer who played as a winger. Born in France, he played for the Comoros national team.

== International career ==
Chamed was called to represent Comoros in May 2014.

== Career statistics ==
=== International ===
Appearances and goals by national team and year
National team	Year	Apps	Goals
Comoros	2015	4	0
Comoros	2016	3	0
Comoros	2017	4	0
Comoros	2018	4	1
Comoros	2019	4	0
Comoros	2020	1	0
Comoros	2021	3	0
Comoros	2022	2	0
Total		25	1

Scores and results list Comoros' goal tally first, score column indicates score after each Chamed goal.

No.	Date	Venue	Opponent	Score	Result	Competition
1.	17 November 2018	Stade de Beaumer, Moroni, Comoros	Malawi	2–1	2–1	2019 Africa Cup of Nations qualification
