= Ismail Diakhité =

Mauritanian footballer

Personal information
- Full name: Ismail Diakhité
- Date of birth: 13 December 1991 (age 34)
- Place of birth: Nouakchott, Mauritania
- Height: 1.74 m (5 ft 9 in)
- Position: Forward

Team information
- Current team: Al-Qaisumah
- Number: 11

Senior career*
Years	Team	Apps	(Gls)
2007–2013	ASAC Concorde		
2013–2015	Hammam-Lif	54	(11)
2015–2016	Al-Fayha		(2)
2016	→ Al-Nahda (loan)		(2)
2016–2017	AS Marsa	14	(1)
2017	Al-Khaleej	6	(1)
2017	IR Tanger	7	(0)
2018	ASAC Concorde		
2018–2020	US Tataouine	51	(12)
2020–2021	Al-Shamal	2	
2021–2023	CS Sfaxien	41	(5)
2023–2024	Al-Naft		
2024–	Al-Qaisumah		

International career^{‡}
2008–	Mauritania	63	(9)
- * Club domestic league appearances and goals as of 13 April 2022 ‡ National team caps and goals as of 13 April 2022

Ismail Diakhité (born 18 December 1991) is a Mauritanian professional footballer who plays as a forward for Al-Qaisumah and the Mauritania national team.

== Career ==
On 28 September 2024, Diakité joined Saudi Second Division League club Al-Qaisumah.

On 18 November 2018, Diakité scored the goal that qualified the Mauritania national team to the 2019 Africa Cup of Nations for the first time ever, against Botswana in a 2–1 win.

== Career statistics ==
As of match played 14 June 2019
Scores and results list Mauritania's goal tally first, score column indicates score after each Diakhité goal.

List of international goals scored by Ismail Diakhité
No.	Date	Venue	Opponent	Score	Result	Competition	Ref.
1	27 February 2013	Independence Stadium, Bakau, Gambia	Gambia	2–0	2–0	Friendly	
2	17 May 2014	Stade Olympique, Nouakchott, Mauritania	Equatorial Guinea	1–0	1–0	2015 Africa Cup of Nations qualification	
3	13 October 2015	Stade Olympique, Nouakchott, Mauritania	South Sudan	4–0	4–0	2018 FIFA World Cup qualification	
4	28 May 2016	Campo Nuevo Municipal de Cornella, Cornellà de Llobregat, Spain	Gabon	1–0	2–0	Friendly	
5	8 September 2018	Stade Cheikha Ould Boïdiya, Nouakchott, Mauritania	Burkina Faso	1–0	2–0	2019 Africa Cup of Nations qualification	
6	18 November 2018	Stade Olympique, Nouakchott, Mauritania	Botswana	1–1	2–1	2019 Africa Cup of Nations qualification	
7	18 November 2018	Stade Olympique, Nouakchott, Mauritania	Botswana	2–1	2–1	2019 Africa Cup of Nations qualification	
8	14 June 2019	Stade de Marrakech, Marrakesh, Morocco	Madagascar	3–1	3–1	Friendly	
