= Adama Ba =

Mauritanian footballer

Personal information
- Full name: Adama Ba
- Date of birth: 27 August 1993 (age 33)
- Place of birth: Gouraye, Mauritania
- Height: 1.70 m (5 ft 7 in)
- Position: Winger

Senior career*
Years	Team	Apps	(Gls)
2011–2013	Brest	16	(0)
2013–2015	Bastia	12	(3)
2014–2015	→ Niort (loan)	27	(3)
2015–2017	Auxerre	53	(6)
2017–2018	Gazişehir Gaziantep	14	(2)
2018–2019	Giresunspor	18	(0)
2019–	RS Berkane	6	(1)
2021	→ Lamia (loan)	8	(0)

International career^{‡}
2013–2022	Mauritania	42	(6)
- * Club domestic league appearances and goals as of 21:03, 28 February 2021 (UTC) ‡ National team caps and goals as of 16 November 2021

Adama Ba (Arabic: آدما با; born 27 August 1993) is a Mauritanian professional footballer who plays as a winger.

== Club career ==
In August 2015, Ba joined AJ Auxerre, shortly after being released by SC Bastia.

== International career ==
He was left out of the national team set-up in August 2019.

=== International goals ===
Scores and results list Mauritania's goal tally first.

No	Date	Venue	Opponent	Score	Result	Competition
1.	10 September 2013	Oliva Nova Resort, Oliva, Spain	Canada	1–0	1–0	Friendly
2.	12 April 2014	Stade Olympique, Nouakchott, Mauritania	Mauritius	1–0	1–0	2015 Africa Cup of Nations qualification
3.	31 March 2015	Stade Olympique, Nouakchott, Mauritania	Niger	1–0	2–0	Friendly
4.	16 October 2018	Stade Cheikha Ould Boïdiya, Nouakchott, Mauritania	Angola	1–0	1–0	2019 Africa Cup of Nations qualification
5.	26 March 2019	Accra Sports Stadium, Accra, Ghana	Ghana	1–1	1–3	Friendly
6.	14 June 2019	Stade de Marrakech, Marrakesh, Morocco	Madagascar	1–1	3–1	Friendly
