= Khassa Camara =

Mauritanian footballer (born 1992)

Personal information
- Full name: Khassa Camara
- Date of birth: 22 October 1992 (age 34)
- Place of birth: Châtenay-Malabry, France
- Height: 1.75 m (5 ft 9 in)
- Position: Defensive midfielder

Team information
- Current team: Panegialios

Senior career*
Years	Team	Apps	(Gls)
2010–2014	Troyes B	49	(7)
2012–2015	Troyes	11	(0)
2014–2015	→ Boulogne (loan)	9	(0)
2015–2016	Ergotelis	7	(0)
2016–2020	Xanthi	79	(0)
2020–2022	NorthEast United	28	(1)
2022	Hyderabad	7	(0)
2022–2023	Chania	19	(0)
2023–2024	Agios Nikolaos	26	(0)
2024–2025	GS Marko	28	(2)
2025–2026	A.O. Nea Ionia		
2026–	Panegialios		

International career^{‡}
2013–	Mauritania	40	(1)
- * Club domestic league appearances and goals as of 13:00, 15 February 2026 (UTC) ‡ National team caps and goals as of 15:00, 4 December 2021 (UTC)

Khassa Camara (born 22 October 1992) is a professional footballer who plays as a defensive midfielder for Greek Gamma Ethniki club Panegialios and for the Mauritania national team. Born in France, Camara represents Mauritania at international level.

== Club career ==
Born in Châtenay-Malabry, France, Camara has played for Troyes and Boulogne. On 9 September 2015, he signed a two-year contract with Greek club Ergotelis. After legally filing for his contract with Ergotelis to be terminated due to unpaid wages, he signed a six-month contract with top-level club Xanthi in January 2016.

On 24 September 2020, it was confirmed that Camara has joined Indian Super League outfit NorthEast United FC on a one-year deal. In August 2021, Northeast United FC extended Camara's contract for one year, with an option to extend for another year. He scored his first goal for NorthEast on 4 December against FC Goa in their 2–1 win.

He signed for Hyderabad FC in February 2022, and was part of club's trophy winning squad in the final on 20 March.

In 2026 he signed for Panegialios.

== International career ==
He made his international debut for Mauritania on 8 September 2013 in a 0–0 draw against Canada. He scored his first goal on 8 September 2018 against Burkina Faso in a 2–0 win.

=== International goals ===
Scores and results list Mauritania's goal tally first.

No	Date	Venue	Opponent	Score	Result	Competition
1.	8 September 2018	Stade Cheikha Ould Boïdiya, Nouakchott, Mauritania	Burkina Faso	2–0	2–0	2019 Africa Cup of Nations qualification

== Honours ==
Hyderabad

- Indian Super League: 2021–22
