= Luis Meseguer =

Equatoguinean footballer (born 1999)

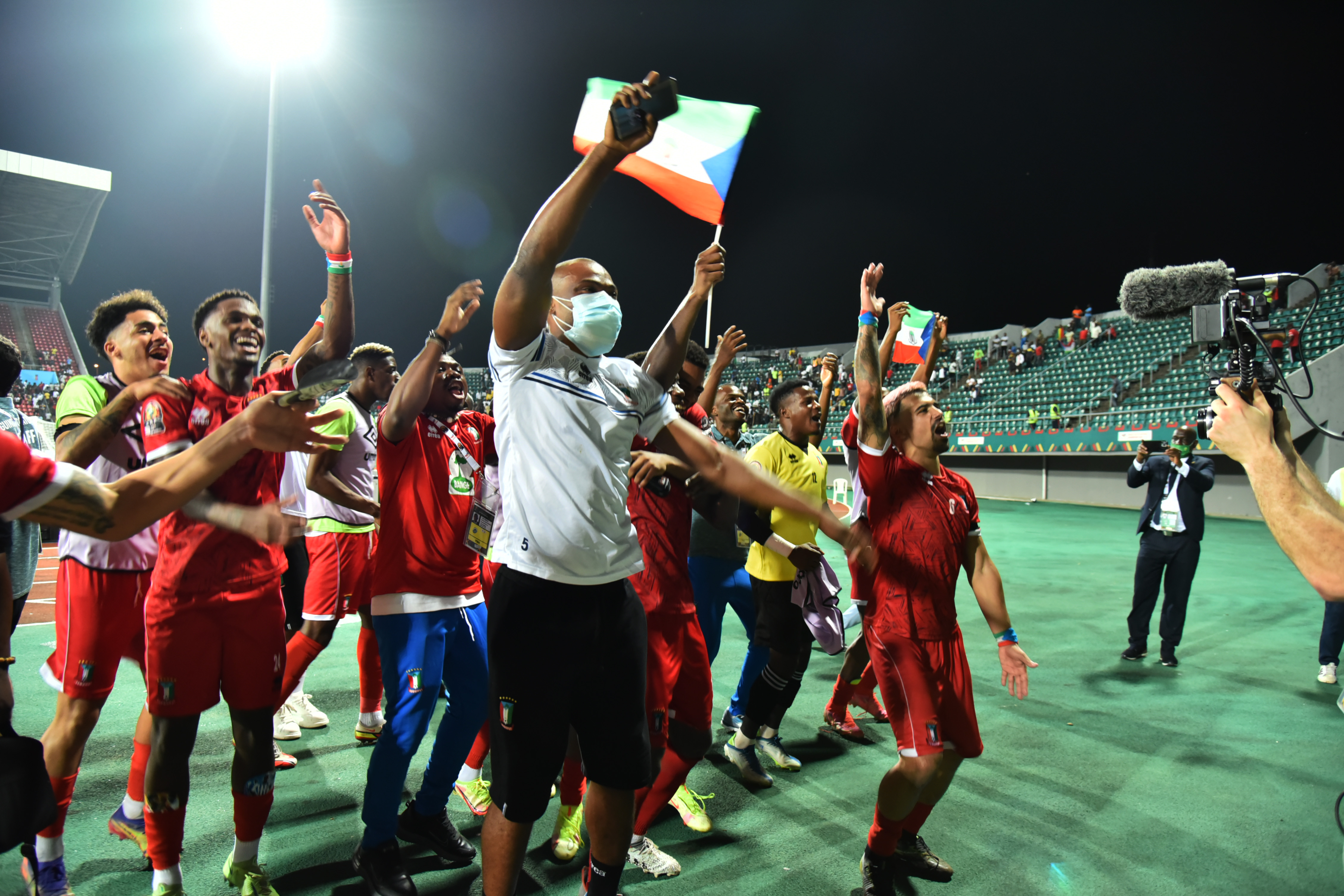
- Meseguer with Equatorial Guinea in 2022

Personal information
- Full name: Luis Alberto Meseguer Villanueva
- Date of birth: 7 September 1999 (age 27)
- Place of birth: Madrid, Spain
- Height: 1.80 m (5 ft 11 in)
- Position: Left-back

Team information
- Current team: Las Rozas

Youth career
- 2008–2015: Atlético Madrid (Note: Including Atlético Madrileño)
- 2015–2016: Unión Adarve
- 2016–2018: Rayo Vallecano

Senior career*
| Years | Team | Apps | (Gls) |
| 2018–2020 | Rayo Vallecano B | 50 | (2) |
| 2020–2021 | Zamora | 11 | (0) |
| 2021–2022 | Navalcarnero | 13 | (3) |
| 2022–2024 | Unión Adarve | 48 | (3) |
| 2024– | Las Rozas | 0 | (0) |

International career^{‡}
| 2018– | Equatorial Guinea | 15 | (1) |
- * Club domestic league appearances and goals as of 5 May 2024. ‡ National team caps and goals as of 25 March 2024

Luis Alberto Meseguer Villanueva (born 7 September 1999), sometimes known as Mese, is a professional footballer who plays as a defender for Tercera Federación club Las Rozas. Born in Spain, he represents Equatorial Guinea at international level. A left-back, he can also operate as a centre-back and a right-back.

== Club career ==
Meseguer spent most of his youth career in Atlético Madrid. After a year with Unión Adarve, he joined Rayo Vallecano. He made his senior debut with Rayo Vallecano B in 2018. He was an unused substitution for Rayo Vallecano against Leganés at Copa del Rey.

== International career ==
Madrid-born Meseguer qualifies to play for Equatorial Guinea through his father. He made his international debut on 17 November 2018, in a 0–1 loss against Senegal during the 2019 Africa Cup of Nations qualifiers, being he who scored the own goal of the match.

=== International goals ===
Scores and results list Equatorial Guinea's goal tally first.

| No. | Date | Venue | Opponent | Score | Result | Competition |
|---|---|---|---|---|---|---|
| 1. | 4 September 2019 | Al-Hilal Stadium, Omdurman, Sudan | South Sudan | 1–0 | 1–1 | 2022 FIFA World Cup qualification |
