= Mohamed Soudani =

Mauritanian footballer

Personal information
- Full name: Mohamed Abdellahi Soudani Dicko
- Date of birth: 17 September 1995 (age 31)
- Place of birth: Nouadhibou, Mauritania
- Position: Striker

Senior career*
Years	Team	Apps	(Gls)
2013–2015	FC Nouadhibou		
2015–2016	Stade Tunisien	12	(1)
2016–2017	US Tataouine	21	(7)
2017–2018	Al-Watani		
2018	AS Gabès	7	(0)
2019	DRB Tadjenanet	2	(0)
2019–2021	FC Nouadhibou		
2021–2022	Al-Lewaa		

International career^{‡}
2015–	Mauritania	7	(1)
- * Club domestic league appearances and goals as of 23:27, 29 February 2020 (UTC) ‡ National team caps and goals as of 15:21, 23 January 2019 (UTC)

Mohamed Abdellahi Soudani Dicko (born 17 September 1995) is a Mauritanian international footballer who plays as a striker.

== Club career ==
Born in Nouadhibou, he has played club football for FC Nouadhibou, Stade Tunisien, US Tataouine, Al-Watani, AS Gabès, DRB Tadjenanet and Al-Lewaa.

On 8 October 2021, Al-Lewaa has signed Soudani for one seasons from FC Nouadhibou.

== International career ==
He made his international debut for Mauritania in 2015.
