= 2018–19 CAF Confederation Cup qualifying rounds =

- Dates: 27 November 2018 – 20 January 2019

The 2018–19 CAF Confederation Cup qualifying rounds were played from 27 November 2018 to 20 January 2019. A total of 70 teams competed in the international football qualifying rounds to decide the 16 places in the group stage of the 2018–19 CAF Confederation Cup.

== Draw ==
The draw for the preliminary round and first round was held on 3 November 2018 in Rabat, Morocco, and was officially announced by the CAF on 9 November due to a special situation with the transitional calendar.

The entry round of the 55 teams entered into the draw was determined by their performances in the CAF competitions for the previous five seasons (CAF 5-year ranking points shown in parentheses).

Entry round	First round (9 teams)	Preliminary round (46 teams)
Teams	(Tunisia) Étoile du Sahel (50.5 pts); (Egypt) Zamalek (30 pts); (Morocco) Raja Casablanca (Note: At the time of the qualifying round draw, the 2018 CAF Confederation Cup Final had not been completed, and thus the identity of the third team from the association of the Confederation Cup winners which were given a bye to the first round was not known.) (25 pts); (Egypt) Al-Masry (15 pts); (Uganda) KCCA (14 pts); (Libya) Al-Ahli Tripoli (13.5 pts); (Tunisia) CS Sfaxien (13 pts); (Morocco) RS Berkane (Note: At the time of the qualifying round draw, the identity of the second team from Morocco which were given a bye to the first round was not known.) (10 pts); (Sudan) El-Hilal El-Obeid (8 pts)	(Mali) Djoliba (2.5 pts); (Democratic Republic of the Congo) DC Motema Pembe; (Democratic Republic of the Congo) AS Nyuki; (Morocco) Hassania Agadir; (Algeria) NA Hussein Dey; (Algeria) USM Bel Abbès; (South Africa) Kaizer Chiefs; (South Africa) Free State Stars; (Sudan) Al-Ahly Shendi; (Zambia) Green Buffaloes; (Zambia) Green Eagles; (Libya) Al-Ittihad; (Cameroon) New Star; (Cameroon) Eding Sport (Note: At the time of the qualifying round draw, the identity of the second team from Cameroon was not known.); (Ivory Coast) FC San Pédro; (Ivory Coast) Stade d'Abidjan; (Ethiopia) Defence Force; (Nigeria) Enugu Rangers; (Republic of the Congo) Diables Noirs; (Angola) Petro de Luanda; (Guinea) Wakriya; (Eswatini) Young Buffaloes; (Ghana) Asante Kotoko; (Gabon) Cercle Mbéri Sportif; (Tanzania) Mtibwa Sugar; (Botswana) Orapa United; (Burkina Faso) Salitas; (Burundi) Vital'O; (Central African Republic) Anges de Fatima; (Chad) AS CotonTchad; (Comoros) Miracle Club; (Djibouti) Arta/Solar7; (Equatorial Guinea) Deportivo Unidad; (The Gambia) Armed Forces; (Kenya) Kariobangi Sharks; (Liberia) LISCR; (Madagascar) ASSM Elgeco Plus; (Malawi) Silver Strikers; (Mauritania) Nouakchott King's; (Niger) AS GNN; (Rwanda) Mukura Victory Sports; (Senegal) Génération Foot; (Seychelles) Northern Dynamo; (South Sudan) Al-Merreikh Juba; (Togo) Gomido; (Zanzibar) Zimamoto

== Format ==
In the qualifying rounds, each tie was played on a home-and-away two-legged basis. If the aggregate score was tied after the second leg, the away goals rule would be applied, and if still tied, extra time would not be played, and the penalty shoot-out would be used to determine the winner (Regulations III. 13 & 14).

== Schedule ==
The schedule of each round was as follows (matches scheduled in midweek in italics).

Round	First leg	Second leg
Preliminary round	27–28 November 2018	4–5 December 2018
First round	14–16 December 2018	21–23 December 2018
Play-off round	11–14 January 2019	18–20 January 2019

== Bracket ==
The bracket of the draw was announced by the CAF on 9 November 2018. As there were 16 winners of the Confederation Cup first round, but only 15 losers of the Champions League first round for this season, the winners of the first round with the best CAF 5-year ranking (in bold italics) advanced directly to the group stage. The remaining 15 winners of the first round advanced to the play-off round, where they were joined by the 15 losers of the Champions League first round.

Preliminary round
1	(Tunisia) **Étoile du Sahel**	Bye
4
3	(Mauritania) Nouakchott King's	1	1	2
2	(Ivory Coast) **Stade d'Abidjan**	2	0	2 (a)

First round
(Tunisia) **Étoile du Sahel**	3	0	3
(Ivory Coast) Stade d'Abidjan	0	1	1

Preliminary round
1	(Sudan) Al-Ahly Shendi	1	0	1 (1 p)
4	(Democratic Republic of the Congo) **AS Nyuki**	0	1	1 (3 p)
3	(Angola) **Petro de Luanda**	4	2	6
2	(Botswana) Orapa United	0	0	0

First round
(Democratic Republic of the Congo) AS Nyuki	0	0	0
(Angola) **Petro de Luanda**	1	1	2

Preliminary round
1	(Egypt) **Zamalek**	Bye
4
3	(Chad) **AS CotonTchad**	2	1	3
2	(Togo) Gomido	0	1	1

First round
(Egypt) **Zamalek**	7	0	7
(Chad) AS CotonTchad	0	2	2

Preliminary round
1	(Morocco) **Hassania Agadir**	4	0	4
4	(Niger) AS GNN	0	0	0
3	(Senegal) **Génération Foot**	0	1	1
2	(Mali) Djoliba	0	0	0

First round
(Morocco) **Hassania Agadir**	2	0	2
(Senegal) Génération Foot	0	1	1

Preliminary round
1	(Algeria) **USM Bel Abbès**	4	0	4
4	(Liberia) LISCR	0	1	1
3	(Nigeria) **Enugu Rangers**	2	3	5
2	(Ethiopia) Defence Force	0	1	1

First round
(Algeria) USM Bel Abbès	0	0	0
(Nigeria) **Enugu Rangers**	0	2	2

Preliminary round
1	(Egypt) **Al-Masry**	Bye
4
3	(Burkina Faso) **Salitas**	2	1	3 (a)
2	(Guinea) Wakriya	0	3	3

First round
(Egypt) Al-Masry	0	0	0
(Burkina Faso) **Salitas**	2	0	2

Preliminary round
1	(Uganda) **KCCA**	Bye
4
3	(Tanzania) **Mtibwa Sugar**	4	1	5
2	(Seychelles) Northern Dynamo	0	0	0

First round
(Uganda) KCCA	3	2	5
(Tanzania) Mtibwa Sugar	0	1	1

Preliminary round
1	(Democratic Republic of the Congo) **DC Motema Pembe**	4	1	5
4	(Central African Republic) Anges de Fatima	1	1	2
3	(Ivory Coast) **FC San Pédro**	1	1	2
2	(The Gambia) Armed Forces	1	0	1

First round
(Democratic Republic of the Congo) DC Motema Pembe	1	0	1
(Ivory Coast) **FC San Pédro**	1	2	3

Preliminary round
1	(Morocco) **Raja Casablanca**	Bye
4
3	(Gabon) **Cercle Mbéri Sportif**	1	0	1 (4 p)
2	(Malawi) Silver Strikers	0	1	1 (3 p)

First round
(Morocco) **Raja Casablanca**	5	0	5
(Gabon) Cercle Mbéri Sportif	0	1	1

Preliminary round
1	(South Africa) **Kaizer Chiefs**	4	1	5
4	(Zanzibar) Zimamoto	0	2	2
3	(Madagascar) **ASSM Elgeco Plus**	3	1	4
2	(Equatorial Guinea) Deportivo Unidad	1	2	3

First round
(South Africa) **Kaizer Chiefs**	3	3	6
(Madagascar) ASSM Elgeco Plus	0	0	0

Preliminary round
1	(Morocco) **RS Berkane**	Bye
4
3	(Comoros) Miracle Club	0	—
2	(Libya) **Al-Ittihad**	8	—	w/o

First round
(Morocco) **RS Berkane**	3	1	4
(Libya) Al-Ittihad	0	0	0

Preliminary round
1	(Libya) **Al-Ahli Tripoli**	Bye
4
3	(Cameroon) **New Star**	0	4	4
2	(Burundi) Vital'O	0	1	1

First round
(Libya) Al-Ahli Tripoli	1	0	1
(Cameroon) New Star	1	0	1 (a)

Preliminary round
1	(Kenya) **Kariobangi Sharks**	6	3	9
4	(Djibouti) Arta/Solar7	1	0	1
3	(Ghana) **Asante Kotoko**	—	—	w/o
2	(Cameroon) Eding Sport	—	—

First round
(Kenya) Kariobangi Sharks	0	1	1
(Ghana) **Asante Kotoko**	0	2	2

Preliminary round
1	(Sudan) **El-Hilal El-Obeid**	Bye
4
3	(South Africa) Free State Stars	0	0	0
2	(Rwanda) **Mukura Victory Sports**	0	1	1

First round
(Sudan) El-Hilal El-Obeid	0	0	0 (4 p)
(Rwanda) **Mukura Victory Sports**	0	0	0 (5 p)

Preliminary round
1	(Zambia) **Green Eagles**	2	3	5
4	(Eswatini) Young Buffaloes	0	2	2
3	(Algeria) **NA Hussein Dey**	2	1	3
2	(Republic of the Congo) Diables Noirs	0	1	1

First round
(Zambia) Green Eagles	0	1	1
(Algeria) **NA Hussein Dey**	0	2	2

Preliminary round
1	(Tunisia) **CS Sfaxien**	Bye
4
3	(Zambia) **Green Buffaloes**	2	0	2
2	(South Sudan) Al-Merreikh Juba	0	0	0

First round
(Tunisia) **CS Sfaxien**	4	0	4
(Zambia) Green Buffaloes	1	1	2

== Preliminary round ==
The preliminary round included the 46 teams that did not receive byes to the first round.

Team 1	Agg.	Team 2	1st leg	2nd leg
Nouakchott King's (Mauritania)	2–2 (a)	(Ivory Coast) Stade d'Abidjan	1–2	1–0
Al-Ahly Shendi (Sudan)	1–1 (1–3 p)	(Democratic Republic of the Congo) AS Nyuki	1–0	0–1
Petro de Luanda (Angola)	6–0	(Botswana) Orapa United	4–0	2–0
AS CotonTchad (Chad)	3–1	(Togo) Gomido	2–0	1–1
Hassania Agadir (Morocco)	4–0	(Niger) AS GNN	4–0	0–0
Génération Foot (Senegal)	1–0	(Mali) Djoliba	0–0	1–0
USM Bel Abbès (Algeria)	4–1	(Liberia) LISCR	4–0	0–1
Enugu Rangers (Nigeria)	5–1	(Ethiopia) Defence Force	2–0	3–1
Salitas (Burkina Faso)	3–3 (a)	(Guinea) Wakriya	2–0	1–3
Mtibwa Sugar (Tanzania)	5–0	(Seychelles) Northern Dynamo	4–0	1–0
DC Motema Pembe (Democratic Republic of the Congo)	5–2	(Central African Republic) Anges de Fatima	4–1	1–1
FC San Pédro (Ivory Coast)	2–1	(The Gambia) Armed Forces	1–1	1–0
Cercle Mbéri Sportif (Gabon)	1–1 (4–3 p)	(Malawi) Silver Strikers	1–0	0–1
Kaizer Chiefs (South Africa)	5–2	(Zanzibar) Zimamoto	4–0	1–2
ASSM Elgeco Plus (Madagascar)	4–3	(Equatorial Guinea) Deportivo Unidad	3–1	1–2
Miracle Club (Comoros)	w/o (Note: Al-Ittihad won on walkover after Miracle Club withdrew prior to the second leg.)	(Libya) Al-Ittihad	0–8	—
New Star (Cameroon)	4–1	(Burundi) Vital'O	0–0	4–1
Kariobangi Sharks (Kenya)	9–1	(Djibouti) Arta/Solar7	6–1	3–0
Asante Kotoko (Ghana)	w/o (Note: Asante Kotoko won on walkover after FECAFOOT was not able to confirm the engagement of their second representative by the CAF deadline.)	(Cameroon) Eding Sport	—	—
Free State Stars (South Africa)	0–1	(Rwanda) Mukura Victory Sports	0–0	0–1
Green Eagles (Zambia)	5–2	(Eswatini) Young Buffaloes	2–0	3–2
NA Hussein Dey (Algeria)	3–1	(Republic of the Congo) Diables Noirs	2–0	1–1
Green Buffaloes (Zambia)	2–0	(South Sudan) Al-Merreikh Juba	2–0	0–0

Notes:

27 November 2018
17:00 UTC+0

Nouakchott King's (Mauritania)	1–2	(Ivory Coast) Stade d'Abidjan
Samb 51'	Report	Gbané 2'; Kouamé 73'

Stade Cheikha Ould Boïdiya, Nouakchott
Referee: Younoussa Tawel Camara (Guinea)
4 December 2018
16:00 UTC+0

Stade d'Abidjan (Ivory Coast)	0–1	(Mauritania) Nouakchott King's
	Report	Traoré 28'

Stade Robert Champroux, Abidjan
Referee: Gaoussou Kané (Mali)

2–2 on aggregate. Stade d'Abidjan won on away goals.

28 November 2018
19:00 UTC+2

Al-Ahly Shendi (Sudan)	1–0	(Democratic Republic of the Congo) AS Nyuki
Faroug 31'	Report

Shendi Stadium, Shendi
Referee: Mohamed Diraneh Guedi (Djibouti)
5 December 2018
15:30 UTC+1

AS Nyuki (Democratic Republic of the Congo)	1–0	(Sudan) Al-Ahly Shendi
Omajondo 45'	Report
Penalties
Mukombozi (penalty missed)	3–1	(penalty missed) Mutwakil; (penalty missed) Eldin; (penalty missed) Mohamed

Stade des Martyrs, Kinshasa
Referee: Quadri Ololade Adebimpe (Nigeria)

1–1 on aggregate. AS Nyuki won 3–1 on penalties.

27 November 2018
16:00 UTC+1

Petro de Luanda (Angola)	4–0	(Botswana) Orapa United
Job 33'; Vá 69'; Toni 86', 87'	Report

Estádio 11 de Novembro, Luanda
Referee: Ibrahim Ben Tsimanohitsy (Madagascar)
5 December 2018
19:00 UTC+2

Orapa United (Botswana)	0–2	(Angola) Petro de Luanda
	Report	Job 50'; Azulão 53'

Francistown Stadium, Francistown
Referee: Lebalang Martin Mokete (Lesotho)

Petro de Luanda won 6–0 on aggregate.

28 November 2018
15:30 UTC+1

AS CotonTchad (Chad)	2–0	(Togo) Gomido
Yacoub 78'; Mbaihouloum 89'	Report

Stade Omnisports Idriss Mahamat Ouya, N'Djamena
Referee: Jean Marie Koyakobo (Central African Republic)
5 December 2018
15:00 UTC+0

Gomido (Togo)	1–1	(Chad) AS CotonTchad
Adjahli 14'	Report	Abanga 90+2'

Stade Municipal, Lomé
Referee: Maguette N'Diaye (Senegal)

AS CotonTchad won 3–1 on aggregate.

27 November 2018
18:00 UTC+1

Hassania Agadir (Morocco)	4–0	(Niger) AS GNN
Daoudi 19', 70'; El Mallouki 62', 90'	Report

Stade Adrar, Agadir
Referee: Nabil Boukhalfa (Algeria)
4 December 2018
16:30 UTC+1

AS GNN (Niger)	0–0	(Morocco) Hassania Agadir
	Report

Stade Général Seyni Kountché, Niamey
Referee: Youssef Essrayri (Tunisia)

Hassania Agadir won 4–0 on aggregate.

28 November 2018
16:30 UTC+0

Génération Foot (Senegal)	0–0	(Mali) Djoliba
	Report

Stade Ngalandou Diouf, Rufisque
Referee: Maudo Jallow (Gambia)
4 December 2018
16:00 UTC+0

Djoliba (Mali)	0–1	(Senegal) Génération Foot
	Report	Yade 3' (pen.)

Stade Modibo Kéïta, Bamako
Referee: Isaac Montgomery (Liberia)

Génération Foot won 1–0 on aggregate.

27 November 2018
15:30 UTC+1

USM Bel Abbès (Algeria)	4–0	(Liberia) LISCR
Belahouel 23' (pen.); Seguer 76', 87'; Lamara 90'	Report

Stade du 24 Février, Sidi Bel Abbès
Referee: Noureddine El Jaafari (Morocco)
5 December 2018
14:00 UTC+0

LISCR (Liberia)	1–0	(Algeria) USM Bel Abbès
Sheriff 30'	Report

Antoinette Tubman Stadium, Monrovia
Referee: Mathioro Diabel (Mauritania)

USM Bel Abbès won 4–1 on aggregate.

28 November 2018
16:00 UTC+1

Enugu Rangers (Nigeria)	2–0	(Ethiopia) Defence Force
Aguda 55' (pen.), 83' (pen.)	Report

Nnamdi Azikiwe Stadium, Enugu
Referee: Mohamed Ali Moussa (Niger)
5 December 2018
16:00 UTC+3

Defence Force (Ethiopia)	1–3	(Nigeria) Enugu Rangers
Wendmu 3' (pen.)	Report	Silas 35'; Aguda 40'; Itoya 79'

Addis Ababa Stadium, Addis Ababa
Referee: Samuel Uwikunda (Rwanda)

Enugu Rangers won 5–1 on aggregate.

27 November 2018
18:00 UTC+0

Salitas (Burkina Faso)	2–0	(Guinea) Wakriya
A. Traoré 80'; Nikiema 89'	Report

Stade du 4 Août, Ouagadougou
Referee: Eugene Tohouegnon (Benin)
4 December 2018
16:30 UTC+0

Wakriya (Guinea)	3–1	(Burkina Faso) Salitas
Sylla 42'; Kalissa 49'; Ab. Camara 79'	Report	Sawadogo 40'

Stade du 28 Septembre, Conakry
Referee: Alioune Sow Sandigui (Senegal)

3–3 on aggregate. Salitas won on away goals.

27 November 2018
16:00 UTC+3

Mtibwa Sugar (Tanzania)	4–0	(Seychelles) Northern Dynamo
Kibaya 13', 36', 58' (pen.); Msuya 90+1'	Report

Chamazi Stadium, Dar es Salaam
Referee: Pilan Ncube (Zimbabwe)
4 December 2018
17:30 UTC+4

Northern Dynamo (Seychelles)	0–1	(Tanzania) Mtibwa Sugar
	Report	Chanongo 68'

Stade Linité, Victoria
Referee: Eric Manirakiza (Burundi)

Mtibwa Sugar won 5–0 on aggregate.

28 November 2018
15:30 UTC+1

DC Motema Pembe (Democratic Republic of the Congo)	4–1	(Central African Republic) Anges de Fatima
Kolawole 34', 45'; Asante 42'; Tulenge 51' (pen.)	Report	Koulouyeh 90' (pen.)

Stade des Martyrs, Kinshasa
Referee: Justus Mbelle Mbelle (Cameroon)
5 December 2018
15:00 UTC+1

Anges de Fatima (Central African Republic)	1–1	(Democratic Republic of the Congo) DC Motema Pembe
Pelembi 75'	Report	Tulenge 52'

Barthélemy Boganda Stadium, Bangui
Referee: Ahmat Amara Hassane (Chad)

DC Motema Pembe won 5–2 on aggregate.

27 November 2018
16:00 UTC+0

FC San Pédro (Ivory Coast)	1–1	(The Gambia) Armed Forces
Zouzou 89'	Report	Badjie 75'

Stade Robert Champroux, Abidjan
Referee: Djindo Louis Houngnandande (Benin)
4 December 2018
16:00 UTC+0

Armed Forces (The Gambia)	0–1	(Ivory Coast) FC San Pédro
	Report	Manu 45'

Independence Stadium, Bakau
Referee: Delgado Rocha Lenine (Cape Verde)

FC San Pédro won 2–1 on aggregate.

28 November 2018
15:30 UTC+1

Cercle Mbéri Sportif (Gabon)	1–0	(Malawi) Silver Strikers
Nono 19'	Report

Stade Augustin Monédan de Sibang, Libreville
Referee: Numbi Pierre Kibingo (DR Congo)
5 December 2018
14:30 UTC+2

Silver Strikers (Malawi)	1–0	(Gabon) Cercle Mbéri Sportif
Muyaba 70'	Report
Penalties
Muyaba (penalty scored); Sheriff (penalty missed); Limbani (penalty missed)	3–4	Penalty scored

Kamuzu Stadium, Blantyre
Referee: William Oloya (Uganda)

1–1 on aggregate. Cercle Mbéri Sportif won 4–3 on penalties.

28 November 2018
19:30 UTC+2

Kaizer Chiefs (South Africa)	4–0	(Zanzibar) Zimamoto
Billiat 7', 60', 72' (pen.); Mahlasela 68'	Report

Nelson Mandela Bay Stadium, Port Elizabeth
Referee: Nehemia Shifeleni Shoovaleka (Namibia)
4 December 2018
16:00 UTC+3

Zimamoto (Zanzibar)	2–1	(South Africa) Kaizer Chiefs
Mtuba 43' (pen.), 73' (pen.)	Report	Manyama 51'

Amaan Stadium, Zanzibar City
Referee: Dawit Asamenew (Ethiopia)

Kaizer Chiefs won 5–1 on aggregate.

28 November 2018
14:30 UTC+3

ASSM Elgeco Plus (Madagascar)	3–1	(Equatorial Guinea) Deportivo Unidad
E. Ranaivoson 9', 54'; Fanomezana 49'	Report	Etoho 7'

Mahamasina Municipal Stadium, Antananarivo
Referee: João Goma (Angola)
5 December 2018
18:00 UTC+1

Deportivo Unidad (Equatorial Guinea)	2–1	(Madagascar) ASSM Elgeco Plus
Etoho 69', 72'	Report	E. Ranaivoson 18'

Estadio de Malabo, Malabo
Referee: Serge Soumou (Congo)

ASSM Elgeco Plus won 4–3 on aggregate.

28 November 2018
15:00 UTC+3

Miracle Club (Comoros)	0–8	(Libya) Al-Ittihad
	Report	Zubya 47', 53', 78', 80'; Elmslaty 65'; Al-Shadi 68'; Al-Abasi 85'; Sabbou 88'

Stade de Moroni, Moroni
Referee: Elly Ally Sasii (Tanzania)
5 December 2018
18:00 UTC+1

Al-Ittihad (Libya)	Cancelled	(Comoros) Miracle Club
	Report

Stade Olympique de Sousse, Sousse (Tunisia) (Note: Teams from Libya are not allowed to host their home matches in their country due to security concerns.)
Referee: Mahmoud El Banna (Egypt)

Al-Ittihad won on walkover after Miracle Club withdrew prior to the second leg.

28 November 2018
15:00 UTC+1

New Star (Cameroon)	0–0	(Burundi) Vital'O
	Report

Limbe Stadium, Limbe
Referee: Isidore Essono Nze (Gabon)
5 December 2018
15:00 UTC+2

Vital'O (Burundi)	1–4	(Cameroon) New Star
Dusabe 45'	Report	Ngongang 4', 31', 43', 88'

Prince Louis Rwagasore Stadium, Bujumbura
Referee: Anthony Ogwayo (Kenya)

New Star won 4–1 on aggregate.

27 November 2018
16:00 UTC+3

Kariobangi Sharks (Kenya)	6–1	(Djibouti) Arta/Solar7
Abuya 2'; Lokale 11'; Koman 16' (o.g.); Omoto 41'; Abege 75'; Origa 90+2'	Report	Koman 44' (pen.)

Moi International Sports Centre, Kasarani
Referee: Mohamed Nur Muhudin (Somalia)
5 December 2018
16:00 UTC+3

Arta/Solar7 (Djibouti)	0–3	(Kenya) Kariobangi Sharks
	Report	Abege 27'; Wasambo 85'; Abuya 87'

El Hadj Hassan Gouled Aptidon Stadium, Djibouti
Referee: Gait Metodious Oting (South Sudan)

Kariobangi Sharks won 9–1 on aggregate.

27 November 2018

Asante Kotoko (Ghana)	Cancelled	(Cameroon) Eding Sport
	Report

4 December 2018

Eding Sport (Cameroon)	Cancelled	(Ghana) Asante Kotoko
	Report

Asante Kotoko won on walkover after the Cameroonian Football Federation was not able to confirm the engagement of Eding Sport by the CAF deadline.

28 November 2018
15:00 UTC+2

Free State Stars (South Africa)	0–0	(Rwanda) Mukura Victory Sports
	Report

Bidvest Stadium, Johannesburg
Referee: Celso Alvação (Mozambique)
5 December 2018
15:30 UTC+2

Mukura Victory Sports (Rwanda)	1–0	(South Africa) Free State Stars
Nshimirimana 55'	Report

Stade Huye, Butare
Referee: Bienvenu Sinko (Ivory Coast)

Mukura Victory Sports won 1–0 on aggregate.

27 November 2018
15:00 UTC+2

Green Eagles (Zambia)	2–0	(Eswatini) Young Buffaloes
Mwamba 60'; Manongo 90'	Report

Arthur Davies Stadium, Kitwe
Referee: Hafiz Abdelghani Alamen (Sudan)
5 December 2018
15:00 UTC+2

Young Buffaloes (Eswatini)	2–3	(Zambia) Green Eagles
Dlamini 50' (pen.), 82'	Report	Tembo 10', 20'; Sautu 14'

Mavuso Sports Centre, Manzini
Referee: Tshepo Mokani Gobagoba (Botswana)

Green Eagles won 5–2 on aggregate.

27 November 2018
17:45 UTC+1

NA Hussein Dey (Algeria)	2–0	(Republic of the Congo) Diables Noirs
Gasmi 20'; Dadi 53'	Report

Stade du 5 Juillet 1962, Algiers
Referee: Esam Al Jahani (Libya)
4 December 2018
15:30 UTC+1

Diables Noirs (Republic of the Congo)	1–1	(Algeria) NA Hussein Dey
Bidimbou 67'	Report	Ouertani 90'

Stade Alphonse Massemba-Débat, Brazzaville
Referee: Esterline Gonçalves Género (São Tomé and Príncipe)

NA Hussein Dey won 3–1 on aggregate.

28 November 2018
15:00 UTC+2

Green Buffaloes (Zambia)	2–0	(South Sudan) Al-Merreikh Juba
Samu 60'; Chikandiwa 72'	Report

Nkoloma Stadium, Lusaka
Referee: Alfred Mbuto Chilinda (Malawi)
5 December 2018
16:00 UTC+3

Al-Merreikh Juba (South Sudan)	0–0	(Zambia) Green Buffaloes
	Report

Juba Stadium, Juba
Referee: Yemane Asfaha Gebremedhin (Eritrea)

Green Buffaloes won 2–0 on aggregate.

== First round ==
The first round included 32 teams: the 9 teams that received byes to this round, and the 23 winners of the preliminary round.

Team 1	Agg.	Team 2	1st leg	2nd leg
Étoile du Sahel (Tunisia)	3–1	(Ivory Coast) Stade d'Abidjan	3–0	0–1
AS Nyuki (Democratic Republic of the Congo)	0–2	(Angola) Petro de Luanda	0–1	0–1
Zamalek (Egypt)	7–2	(Chad) AS CotonTchad	7–0	0–2
Hassania Agadir (Morocco)	2–1	(Senegal) Génération Foot	2–0	0–1
USM Bel Abbès (Algeria)	0–2	(Nigeria) Enugu Rangers	0–0	0–2
Al-Masry (Egypt)	0–2	(Burkina Faso) Salitas	0–2	0–0
KCCA (Uganda)	5–1	(Tanzania) Mtibwa Sugar	3–0	2–1
DC Motema Pembe (Democratic Republic of the Congo)	1–3	(Ivory Coast) FC San Pédro	1–1	0–2
Raja Casablanca (Morocco)	5–1	(Gabon) Cercle Mbéri Sportif	5–0	0–1
Kaizer Chiefs (South Africa)	6–0	(Madagascar) ASSM Elgeco Plus	3–0	3–0
RS Berkane (Morocco)	4–0	(Libya) Al-Ittihad	3–0	1–0
Al-Ahli Tripoli (Libya)	1–1 (a)	(Cameroon) New Star	1–1	0–0
Kariobangi Sharks (Kenya)	1–2	(Ghana) Asante Kotoko	0–0	1–2
El-Hilal El-Obeid (Sudan)	0–0 (4–5 p)	(Rwanda) Mukura Victory Sports	0–0	0–0
Green Eagles (Zambia)	1–2	(Algeria) NA Hussein Dey	0–0	1–2
CS Sfaxien (Tunisia)	4–2	(Zambia) Green Buffaloes	4–1	0–1

15 December 2018
15:00 UTC+1

Étoile du Sahel (Tunisia)	3–0	(Ivory Coast) Stade d'Abidjan
Aouadhi 27'; Hannachi 30'; Akaïchi 51'	Report

Stade Olympique de Sousse, Sousse
Referee: Jean Claude Ishimwe (Rwanda)
21 December 2018
16:00 UTC+0

Stade d'Abidjan (Ivory Coast)	1–0	(Tunisia) Étoile du Sahel
Bakayoko 51'	Report

Stade Robert Champroux, Abidjan
Referee: Blaise Yuven Ngwa (Cameroon)

Étoile du Sahel won 3–1 on aggregate.

14 December 2018
15:30 UTC+1

AS Nyuki (Democratic Republic of the Congo)	0–1	(Angola) Petro de Luanda
	Report	Vá 28'

Stade des Martyrs, Kinshasa
Referee: Belay Tadesse (Ethiopia)
21 December 2018
16:00 UTC+1

Petro de Luanda (Angola)	1–0	(Democratic Republic of the Congo) AS Nyuki
Azulão 65'	Report

Estádio 11 de Novembro, Luanda
Referee: Celso Alvação (Mozambique)

Petro de Luanda won 2–0 on aggregate.

15 December 2018
19:00 UTC+2

Zamalek (Egypt)	7–0	(Chad) AS CotonTchad
Kahraba 11'; Sassi 16'; Kasongo 22', 41'; Fathi 27', 55'; El Said 81'	Report

Petro Sport Stadium, Cairo
Referee: Brian Miiro (Uganda)
23 December 2018
15:00 UTC+1

AS CotonTchad (Chad)	2–0	(Egypt) Zamalek
Abanga 87'; Adda 90+1'	Report

Stade Omnisports Idriss Mahamat Ouya, N'Djamena
Referee: Bienvenu Sinko (Ivory Coast)

Zamalek won 7–2 on aggregate.

14 December 2018
20:00 UTC+1

Hassania Agadir (Morocco)	2–0	(Senegal) Génération Foot
El Mallouki 2'; Seyam 64'	Report

Stade Adrar, Agadir
Referee: Fabricio Duarte (Cape Verde)
23 December 2018
16:00 UTC+0

Génération Foot (Senegal)	1–0	(Morocco) Hassania Agadir
Sanneh 66'	Report

Stade Al Djigo, Pikine
Referee: Abdulwahid Huraywidah (Libya)

Hassania Agadir won 2–1 on aggregate.

15 December 2018
16:00 UTC+1

USM Bel Abbès (Algeria)	0–0	(Nigeria) Enugu Rangers
	Report

Stade du 24 Février, Sidi Bel Abbès
Referee: Isaac Montgomery (Liberia)
23 December 2018
16:00 UTC+1

Enugu Rangers (Nigeria)	2–0	(Algeria) USM Bel Abbès
Silas 6', 45+1'	Report

Nnamdi Azikiwe Stadium, Enugu
Referee: Issa Sy (Senegal)

Enugu Rangers won 2–0 on aggregate.

15 December 2018
16:30 UTC+2

Al-Masry (Egypt)	0–2	(Burkina Faso) Salitas
	Report	Badolo 31'; Karambiri 71'

Al-Masry Club Stadium, Port Said
Referee: Mohamed Ali Moussa (Niger)
22 December 2018
16:00 UTC+0

Salitas (Burkina Faso)	0–0	(Egypt) Al-Masry
	Report

Stade du 4 Août, Ouagadougou
Referee: Quadri Ololade Adebimpe (Nigeria)

Salitas won 2–0 on aggregate.

15 December 2018
16:00 UTC+3

KCCA (Uganda)	3–0	(Tanzania) Mtibwa Sugar
Kyambadde 48'; Kaddu 73'; Okello 85'	Report

Phillip Omondi Stadium, Kampala
Referee: Ali Adelaïd (Comoros)
22 December 2018
16:00 UTC+3

Mtibwa Sugar (Tanzania)	1–2	(Uganda) KCCA
Kihimbwa 51'	Report	Mutyaba 28'; Okello 86'

Chamazi Stadium, Dar es Salaam
Referee: Nehemia Shifeleni Shoovaleka (Namibia)

KCCA won 5–1 on aggregate.

15 December 2018
15:30 UTC+1

DC Motema Pembe (Democratic Republic of the Congo)	1–1	(Ivory Coast) FC San Pédro
Koné 31'	Report	Gnanzou 17'

Stade des Martyrs, Kinshasa
Referee: Jean Marc Ganamandji (Central African Republic)
22 December 2018
16:00 UTC+0

FC San Pédro (Ivory Coast)	2–0	(Democratic Republic of the Congo) DC Motema Pembe
Anicet 13', 45'	Report

Stade Félix Houphouët-Boigny, Abidjan
Referee: Nabil Boukhalfa (Algeria)

FC San Pédro won 3–1 on aggregate.

16 December 2018
17:00 UTC+1

Raja Casablanca (Morocco)	5–0	(Gabon) Cercle Mbéri Sportif
Banoun 52'; Benhalib 58'; Achchakir 68' (pen.); Soumahoro 84' (o.g.); Shaban 88'	Report

Stade Mohammed V, Casablanca
Referee: Ibrahim Nour El Din (Egypt)
22 December 2018
15:30 UTC+1

Cercle Mbéri Sportif (Gabon)	1–0	(Morocco) Raja Casablanca
Nono 41'	Report

Stade Augustin Monédan de Sibang, Libreville
Referee: Lazard Tsiba (Congo)

Raja Casablanca won 5–1 on aggregate.

15 December 2018
20:15 UTC+2

Kaizer Chiefs (South Africa)	3–0	(Madagascar) ASSM Elgeco Plus
Zulu 32'; Castro 86', 89' (pen.)	Report

Moses Mabhida Stadium, Durban
Referee: Tirelo Mositwane (Botswana)
22 December 2018
14:30 UTC+3

ASSM Elgeco Plus (Madagascar)	0–3	(South Africa) Kaizer Chiefs
	Report	Ekstein 71', 86'; Moon 81'

Mahamasina Municipal Stadium, Antananarivo
Referee: Osiase Koto (Lesotho)

Kaizer Chiefs won 6–0 on aggregate.

15 December 2018
17:00 UTC+1

RS Berkane (Morocco)	3–0	(Libya) Al-Ittihad
Traoré 45'; Laachir 74'; Aziz 80'	Report

Stade Municipal de Berkane, Berkane
Referee: Eric Otogo-Castane (Gabon)
22 December 2018
17:00 UTC+1

Al-Ittihad (Libya)	0–1	(Morocco) RS Berkane
	Report	Namsaoui 78'

Stade Olympique de Sousse, Sousse (Tunisia)
Referee: Jean-Jacques Ndala Ngambo (DR Congo)

RS Berkane won 4–0 on aggregate.

15 December 2018
14:00 UTC+1

Al-Ahli Tripoli (Libya)	1–1	(Cameroon) New Star
Al-Zaletni 20'	Report	Ngongang 61'

Stade El Menzah, Tunis (Tunisia)
Referee: Adil Zourak (Morocco)
23 December 2018
15:00 UTC+1

New Star (Cameroon)	0–0	(Libya) Al-Ahli Tripoli
	Report

Limbe Stadium, Limbe
Referee: Tsegay Mogos Teklu (Eritrea)

1–1 on aggregate. New Star won on away goals.

15 December 2018
15:00 UTC+3

Kariobangi Sharks (Kenya)	0–0	(Ghana) Asante Kotoko
	Report

Moi International Sports Centre, Kasarani
Referee: Pierre Atcho (Gabon)
22 December 2018
15:30 UTC+0

Asante Kotoko (Ghana)	2–1	(Kenya) Kariobangi Sharks
Safiu 17'; Frimpong 40'	Report	Omoto 29'

Baba Yara Stadium, Kumasi
Referee: Mashood Ssali (Uganda)

Asante Kotoko won 2–1 on aggregate.

15 December 2018
18:30 UTC+2

El-Hilal El-Obeid (Sudan)	0–0	(Rwanda) Mukura Victory Sports
	Report

El-Obeid Stadium, El-Obeid
Referee: Ring Nyier Akech Malong (South Sudan)
22 December 2018
15:30 UTC+2

Mukura Victory Sports (Rwanda)	0–0	(Sudan) El-Hilal El-Obeid
	Report
Penalties
Duhayindavyi (penalty scored); Iddy (penalty scored); Ndizeye (penalty scored); Twizerimana (penalty scored); Ndayishimiye (penalty scored)	5–4	(penalty scored) Tahir; (penalty missed) Ibrahim; (penalty scored) Dafalla; (penalty scored) Musa; (penalty scored) Hassan

Stade Huye, Butare
Referee: Thulani Sibandze (Swaziland)

0–0 on aggregate. Mukura Victory Sports won 5–4 on penalties.

15 December 2018
15:00 UTC+2

Green Eagles (Zambia)	0–0	(Algeria) NA Hussein Dey
	Report

Nkoloma Stadium, Lusaka
Referee: Andofetra Rakotojaona (Madagascar)
22 December 2018
17:45 UTC+1

NA Hussein Dey (Algeria)	2–1	(Zambia) Green Eagles
Gasmi 36' (pen.), 90+4'	Report	Mulenga 3'

Stade du 5 Juillet 1962, Algiers
Referee: Mfaume Ali Nassoro (Tanzania)

NA Hussein Dey won 2–1 on aggregate.

15 December 2018
18:00 UTC+1

CS Sfaxien (Tunisia)	4–1	(Zambia) Green Buffaloes
Marzouki 28', 52'; Amamou 79'; Chaouat 90'	Report	Mungule 40'

Stade Taïeb Mhiri, Sfax
Referee: Alhadi Mahamat (Chad)
23 December 2018
15:00 UTC+2

Green Buffaloes (Zambia)	1–0	(Tunisia) CS Sfaxien
Katiba 82'	Report

Nkoloma Stadium, Lusaka
Referee: Ishmael Chizinga (Malawi)

CS Sfaxien won 4–2 on aggregate.

== Play-off round ==
The play-off round included 30 teams: 15 of the 16 winners of the Confederation Cup first round, and the 15 losers of the Champions League first round. The draw for the play-off round was held on 28 December 2018, 18:00 CAT (UTC+2), at the Nile Ritz-Carlton in Cairo, Egypt. The winners of the Confederation Cup first round were drawn against the losers of the Champions League first round, with the teams from the Confederation Cup hosting the second leg.

The teams were seeded by their performances in the CAF competitions for the previous five seasons (CAF 5-year ranking points shown in parentheses):

- Pot A contained the seven seeded losers of the Champions League first round.
- Pot B contained the five seeded winners of the Confederation Cup first round.
- Pot C contained the eight unseeded losers of the Champions League first round.
- Pot D contained the ten unseeded winners of the Confederation Cup first round.

First, a team from Pot A and a team from Pot D were drawn into seven ties. Next, a team from Pot B and a team from Pot C were drawn into five ties. Finally, the remaining teams from Pot C and Pot D were drawn into the last three ties.

Bye to group stage	(Tunisia) Étoile du Sahel (50.5 pts)

Pot	Pot A	Pot B	Pot C	Pot D
Qualified from	Champions League	Confederation Cup	Champions League	Confederation Cup
Teams	(Zambia) ZESCO United (30 pts); (Sudan) Al-Hilal (16.5 pts); (Cameroon) Coton Sport (7 pts); (Kenya) Gor Mahia (5 pts); (Mali) Stade Malien (2 pts); (Libya) Al-Ahly Benghazi (1 pt); (Zambia) Nkana (1 pt)	(Egypt) Zamalek (30 pts); (Morocco) Raja Casablanca (25 pts); (Uganda) KCCA (14 pts); (Tunisia) CS Sfaxien (13 pts); (Morocco) RS Berkane (10 pts)	(Republic of the Congo) AS Otôho; (Ethiopia) Jimma Aba Jifar; (Lesotho) Bantu; (Libya) Al-Nasr; (Morocco) Ittihad Tanger; (Namibia) African Stars; (Senegal) ASC Diaraf; (Uganda) Vipers	(Algeria) NA Hussein Dey; (Angola) Petro de Luanda; (Burkina Faso) Salitas; (Cameroon) New Star; (Ghana) Asante Kotoko; (Ivory Coast) FC San Pédro; (Morocco) Hassania Agadir; (Nigeria) Enugu Rangers; (Rwanda) Mukura Victory Sports; (South Africa) Kaizer Chiefs

The 15 winners of the play-off round advanced to the group stage to join Étoile du Sahel, who advanced directly to the group stage as the winners of the first round with the best CAF 5-year ranking.

Team 1	Agg.	Team 2	1st leg	2nd leg
Gor Mahia (Kenya)	2–1	(Cameroon) New Star	2–1	0–0
Al-Ahly Benghazi (Libya)	2–3	(Algeria) NA Hussein Dey	1–0	1–3
Al-Hilal (Sudan)	3–1	(Rwanda) Mukura Victory Sports	3–0	0–1
Nkana (Zambia)	3–0	(Ivory Coast) FC San Pédro	3–0	0–0
Coton Sport (Cameroon)	3–5	(Ghana) Asante Kotoko	2–3	1–2
ZESCO United (Zambia)	5–2	(South Africa) Kaizer Chiefs	3–1	2–1
Stade Malien (Mali)	2–3	(Angola) Petro de Luanda	1–1	1–2
African Stars (Namibia)	1–2	(Morocco) Raja Casablanca	1–1	0–1
ASC Diaraf (Senegal)	3–5	(Morocco) RS Berkane	2–0	1–5
Vipers (Uganda)	0–3	(Tunisia) CS Sfaxien	0–0	0–3
Ittihad Tanger (Morocco)	1–3	(Egypt) Zamalek	0–0	1–3
AS Otôho (Republic of the Congo)	3–2	(Uganda) KCCA	3–0	0–2
Bantu (Lesotho)	2–4	(Nigeria) Enugu Rangers	1–2	1–2
Al-Nasr (Libya)	2–3	(Burkina Faso) Salitas	1–0	1–3
Jimma Aba Jifar (Ethiopia)	0–5	(Morocco) Hassania Agadir	0–1	0–4

13 January 2019
16:00 UTC+3

Gor Mahia (Kenya)	2–1	(Cameroon) New Star
Juma 41'; Tuyisenge 87'	Report	Bechem 73'

Moi International Sports Centre, Kasarani
Referee: Haythem Guirat (Tunisia)
20 January 2019
15:00 UTC+1

New Star (Cameroon)	0–0	(Kenya) Gor Mahia
	Report

Limbe Stadium, Limbe
Referee: Kokou Ognankotan Ntale (Togo)

Gor Mahia won 2–1 on aggregate.

11 January 2019
15:00 UTC+1

Al-Ahly Benghazi (Libya)	1–0	(Algeria) NA Hussein Dey
Bigermawi 90+2'	Report

Stade Chedly Zouiten, Tunis (Tunisia)
Referee: Peter Waweru (Kenya)
20 January 2019
19:00 UTC+1

NA Hussein Dey (Algeria)	3–1	(Libya) Al-Ahly Benghazi
Chouiter 34'; Gasmi 55' (pen.), 67'	Report	Azzi 47' (o.g.)

Stade du 5 Juillet 1962, Algiers
Referee: Souleiman Ahmed Djama (Djibouti)

NA Hussein Dey won 3–2 on aggregate.

13 January 2019
19:00 UTC+2

Al-Hilal (Sudan)	3–0	(Rwanda) Mukura Victory Sports
Mukhtar 6'; Mbombo 61'; Bashir 81'	Report

Al-Hilal Stadium, Omdurman
Referee: Hassan Mohamed Hagi (Somalia)
19 January 2019
15:30 UTC+2

Mukura Victory Sports (Rwanda)	1–0	(Sudan) Al-Hilal
Iradukunda 29'	Report

Stade Huye, Butare
Referee: Ahmad Imtehaz Heeralall (Mauritius)

Al-Hilal won 3–1 on aggregate.

12 January 2019
15:00 UTC+2

Nkana (Zambia)	3–0	(Ivory Coast) FC San Pédro
R. Kampamba 43'; J. Musonda 50'; Mbewe 86'	Report

Nkana Stadium, Kitwe
Referee: Mahmood Ali Mahmood Ismail (Sudan)
20 January 2019
16:00 UTC+0

FC San Pédro (Ivory Coast)	0–0	(Zambia) Nkana
	Report

Stade Félix Houphouët-Boigny, Abidjan
Referee: Mohamed Ali Moussa (Niger)

Nkana won 3–0 on aggregate.

13 January 2019
15:30 UTC+1

Coton Sport (Cameroon)	2–3	(Ghana) Asante Kotoko
Daouda 40' (pen.); Araina 71'	Report	Gyamfi 10'; Baakoh 30'; Safiu 50'

Stade Militaire, Yaoundé
Referee: Samir Guezzaz (Morocco)
20 January 2019
15:00 UTC+0

Asante Kotoko (Ghana)	2–1	(Cameroon) Coton Sport
Frimpong 45' (pen.); Baakoh 53'	Report	Oumarou 86'

Baba Yara Stadium, Kumasi
Referee: Fabricio Duarte (Cape Verde)

Asante Kotoko won 5–3 on aggregate.

13 January 2019
15:00 UTC+2

ZESCO United (Zambia)	3–1	(South Africa) Kaizer Chiefs
Kambole 25'; Were 31' (pen.), 54'	Report	Billiat 43'

Levy Mwanawasa Stadium, Ndola
Referee: Norman Matemera (Zimbabwe)
19 January 2019
20:00 UTC+2

Kaizer Chiefs (South Africa)	1–2	(Zambia) ZESCO United
Billiat 89'	Report	Akumu 10'; Were 68'

FNB Stadium, Johannesburg
Referee: Belay Tadesse (Ethiopia)

ZESCO United won 5–2 on aggregate.

12 January 2019
16:00 UTC+0

Stade Malien (Mali)	1–1	(Angola) Petro de Luanda
Sylla 23'	Report	Vá 31'

Stade Modibo Kéïta, Bamako
Referee: Ring Nyier Akech Malong (South Sudan)
19 January 2019
16:00 UTC+1

Petro de Luanda (Angola)	2–1	(Mali) Stade Malien
Azulão 37'; Vá 81'	Report	Keïta 90+3'

Estádio 11 de Novembro, Luanda
Referee: Issa Sy (Senegal)

Petro de Luanda won 3–2 on aggregate.

12 January 2019
16:00 UTC+2

African Stars (Namibia)	1–1	(Morocco) Raja Casablanca
Handura 42'	Report	Rahimi 49'

Sam Nujoma Stadium, Windhoek
Referee: Antoine Effa (Cameroon)
20 January 2019
17:00 UTC+1

Raja Casablanca (Morocco)	1–0	(Namibia) African Stars
Banoun 56'	Report

Stade de Marrakech, Marrakesh
Referee: Beida Dahane (Mauritania)

Raja Casablanca won 2–1 on aggregate.

14 January 2019
16:30 UTC+0

ASC Diaraf (Senegal)	2–0	(Morocco) RS Berkane
Mbodj 6'; Kane 42'	Report

Stade Léopold Sédar Senghor, Dakar
Referee: Sidi Alioum (Cameroon)
19 January 2019
19:00 UTC+1

RS Berkane (Morocco)	5–1	(Senegal) ASC Diaraf
Traoré 27'; Laba 29', 47'; Laachir 39'; Dayo 63'	Report	O. Guèye 46'

Stade Municipal de Berkane, Berkane
Referee: Louis Hakizimana (Rwanda)

RS Berkane won 5–3 on aggregate.

12 January 2019
16:00 UTC+3

Vipers (Uganda)	0–0	(Tunisia) CS Sfaxien
	Report

St Mary's Stadium, Wakiso Town
Referee: Salisu Basheer (Nigeria)
20 January 2019
18:00 UTC+1

CS Sfaxien (Tunisia)	3–0	(Uganda) Vipers
Marzouki 9'; Sokari 33'; Manucho 90+3'	Report

Stade Taïeb Mhiri, Sfax
Referee: Daniel Laryea (Ghana)

CS Sfaxien won 3–0 on aggregate.

13 January 2019
16:00 UTC+1

Ittihad Tanger (Morocco)	0–0	(Egypt) Zamalek
	Report

Stade Ibn Batouta, Tangier
Referee: Celso Alvação (Mozambique)
19 January 2019
19:00 UTC+2

Zamalek (Egypt)	3–1	(Morocco) Ittihad Tanger
Hassan 45'; El Said 55'; Obama 85'	Report	Aarab 50'

Borg El Arab Stadium, Alexandria
Referee: Victor Gomes (South Africa)

Zamalek won 3–1 on aggregate.

13 January 2019
15:30 UTC+1

AS Otôho (Republic of the Congo)	3–0	(Uganda) KCCA
Yedan 20' (pen.), 22'; Wamba 75'	Report

Stade Omnisport Marien Ngouabi d'Owando, Owando
Referee: Adissa Abdul Raphiou Ligali (Benin)
20 January 2019
16:00 UTC+3

KCCA (Uganda)	2–0	(Republic of the Congo) AS Otôho
Kaddu 63'; Okello 90' (pen.)	Report

Phillip Omondi Stadium, Kampala
Referee: Pacifique Ndabihawenimana (Burundi)

AS Otôho won 3–2 on aggregate.

13 January 2019
16:00 UTC+2

Bantu (Lesotho)	1–2	(Nigeria) Enugu Rangers
Jokojokwana 90'	Report	Silas 18'; Aguda 84'

Setsoto Stadium, Maseru
Referee: Andofetra Rakotojaona (Madagascar)
20 January 2019
16:00 UTC+1

Enugu Rangers (Nigeria)	2–1	(Lesotho) Bantu
Ibrahim 18'; Aguda 19'	Report	Fothoane 12'

Nnamdi Azikiwe Stadium, Enugu
Referee: Tsegay Mogos Teklu (Eritrea)

Enugu Rangers won 4–2 on aggregate.

13 January 2019
18:00 UTC+2

Al-Nasr (Libya)	1–0	(Burkina Faso) Salitas
Al-Mehdi 65'	Report

Osman Ahmed Osman Stadium, Cairo (Egypt)
Referee: Amin Mohamed Omar (Egypt)
19 January 2019
16:00 UTC+0

Salitas (Burkina Faso)	3–1	(Libya) Al-Nasr
Demankel 30'; Badolo 32'; Sawadogo 47'	Report	Egwuekwe 73'

Stade du 4 Août, Ouagadougou
Referee: Tirelo Mositwane (Botswana)

Salitas won 3–2 on aggregate.

13 January 2019
16:00 UTC+3

Jimma Aba Jifar (Ethiopia)	0–1	(Morocco) Hassania Agadir
	Report	Chaouch 72'

Addis Ababa Stadium, Addis Ababa
Referee: Boubou Traoré (Mali)
19 January 2019
20:00 UTC+1

Hassania Agadir (Morocco)	4–0	(Ethiopia) Jimma Aba Jifar
Rami 18'; Bouftini 52'; Marković 56'; El Khanboubi 76'	Report

Stade Adrar, Agadir
Referee: Nabil Boukhalfa (Algeria)

Hassania Agadir won 5–0 on aggregate.
