= 2018–19 in Libyan football =

Football in Libya
- Season: 2018–19

The 2018–19 season is the 46th season of competitive association football in Libya.

== Promotion and relegation ==
=== Preseason ===
League	Promoted to league	Relegated from league
Libyan Premier League	Al-Sadaqa; Abu Salem	Qurdabia; Al-Andalus; Ascharara; Abi al Ashhar; Al-Tarsana; Annajma

== National teams ==
=== Libya national football team ===
==== 2019 Africa Cup of Nations qualifications ====
===== Group E =====
Pos	Team	Pld	W	D	L	GF	GA	GD	Pts	Qualification	Nigeria national football team	South Africa national soccer team	Libya national football team	Seychelles national football team
1	Nigeria	6	4	1	1	14	6	+8	13	Final tournament	—	0–2	4–0	3–1
2	South Africa	6	3	3	0	11	2	+9	12	Final tournament	1–1	—	0–0	6–0
3	Libya	6	2	1	3	16	11	+5	7		2–3	1–2	—	5–1
4	Seychelles	6	0	1	5	3	25	−22	1		0–3	0–0	1–8	—

Source: CAF

9 June 2017	Libya	5-1	Seychelles	Cairo, Egypt (Note: Libya will play their home matches outside Libya due to security concerns from the ongoing civil war.)
22:00 UTC+2	Saltou 22'; Benali 26' (pen.); Elhouni 45+1'; Zubya 65'; Ellafi 82'	Report	Coralie 90'	Stadium: Petro Sport Stadium; Referee: Baba Leno (Guinea)

8 September 2018	South Africa	0-0	Libya	Durban, South Africa
15:00 UTC+2		Report		Stadium: Moses Mabhida Stadium; Referee: Sidi Alioum (Cameroon)

13 October 2018	Nigeria	4-0	Libya	Uyo, Nigeria
16:00 UTC+1	Ighalo 4' (pen.), 57', 68'; Kalu 89'	Report		Stadium: Godswill Akpabio International Stadium; Referee: Jean-Jacques Ndala Ngambo (DR Congo)

16 October 2018	Libya	2-3	Nigeria	Sfax, Tunisia
19:00 UTC+1	Zubya 34'; Benali 73'	Report	Ighalo 13', 80'; Musa 16'	Stadium: Stade Taïeb Mhiri; Referee: Joshua Bondo (Botswana)

17 November 2018	Seychelles	1-8	Libya	Victoria, Seychelles
16:30 UTC+4	Monnaie 71'	Report	Sabbou 2'; Saltou 20', 31', 62'; Majdi 55'; Elmslaty 58'; Al-Shadi 85'; Elhouni 90+2'	Stadium: Stade Linité; Referee: Ali Adelaïd (Comoros)

24 March 2019	Libya	v	South Africa	Tunisia
TBD				Stadium: TBD

== CAF Competitions ==
=== 2018–19 CAF Champions League ===
==== Qualifying rounds ====
===== Preliminary round =====
Team 1	Agg.	Team 2	1st leg	2nd leg
FC Nouadhibou (Mauritania)	2–3	(Libya) Al-Ahly Benghazi	2–1	0–2
Al-Nasr (Libya)	9–3	(South Sudan) Al-Hilal Wau	5–1	4–2

===== First qualifying round =====
Team 1	Agg.	Team 2	1st leg	2nd leg
Al-Ahly Benghazi (Libya)	0–4	(South Africa) Mamelodi Sundowns	0–0	0–4
Al-Nasr (Libya)	5–6	(Guinea) Horoya	3–0	2–6

=== 2018–19 CAF Confederation Cup ===
==== Qualifying rounds ====
===== Preliminary round =====
Team 1	Agg.	Team 2	1st leg	2nd leg
Miracle Club (Comoros)	w/o (Note: Al-Ittihad won on walkover after Miracle Club withdrew prior to the second leg.)	(Libya) Al-Ittihad	0–8	—

===== First round =====
Team 1	Agg.	Team 2	1st leg	2nd leg
RS Berkane (Morocco)	4–0	(Libya) Al-Ittihad	3–0	1–0
Al-Ahli Tripoli (Libya)	1–1 (a)	(Cameroon) New Star	1–1	0–0

===== Play-off round =====
Team 1	Agg.	Team 2	1st leg	2nd leg
Al-Ahly Benghazi (Libya)	2–3	(Algeria) NA Hussein Dey	1–0	1–3
Al-Nasr (Libya)	2–3	(Burkina Faso) Salitas	1–0	1–3
