= Libya national football team results (2000–2019) =

This is a list of the Libya national football team results from 2000 until 2019.

== 2000 ==
26 January 2000 Friendly	Uganda	3–2	Libya	Kampala, Uganda

9 April 2000 World Cup qualification	Libya	3–0	Mali	Tripoli, Libya
				Stadium: 11 June Stadium

23 April 2000 World Cup qualification	Mali	3–1	Libya	Bamako, Mali
				Stadium: Stade Modibo Kéïta

18 June 2000 World Cup qualification	Libya	0–3	Cameroon	Tripoli, Libya
				Stadium: 11 June Stadium

2 July 2000 2002 African Cup of Nations qualification	Chad	3–1	Libya	N'Djamena, Chad
				Stadium: Stade Omnisports Idriss Mahamat Ouya

14 July 2000 2002 African Cup of Nations qualification	Libya	3–1 (8–7 p)	Chad	Tripoli, Libya
				Stadium: 11 June Stadium

10 September 2000 2002 African Cup of Nations qualification	Libya	1–0	Sudan	Tripoli, Libya
				Stadium: 11 June Stadium

19 November 2000 2002 African Cup of Nations qualification	Ivory Coast	2–1	Libya	Abidjan, Ivory Coast
				Stadium: Stade Félix Houphouët-Boigny

22 November 2000 Friendly	Morocco	0–0	Libya	Casablanca, Morocco

== 2001 ==
14 January 2001 2002 African Cup of Nations qualification	Egypt	4–0	Libya	Cairo, Egypt

28 January 2001 World Cup qualification	Angola	3–1	Libya	Luanda, Angola

23 February 2001 World Cup qualification	Libya	3–3	Togo	Benghazi, Libya

10 March 2001 World Cup qualification	Zambia	2–0	Libya	Lusaka, Zambia

23 March 2001 2002 African Cup of Nations qualification	Libya	2–0	Egypt	Benghazi, Libya

22 April 2001 World Cup qualification	Cameroon	1–0	Libya	Yaoundé, Cameroon

3 June 2001 2002 African Cup of Nations qualification	Libya	0–3	Ivory Coast	Tripoli, Libya
				Stadium: 11 June Stadium

17 June 2001 2002 African Cup of Nations qualification	Sudan	1–0	Libya	Khartoum, Sudan
				Stadium: Khartoum Stadium

29 June 2001 World Cup qualification	Libya	1–1	Angola	Tripoli, Libya
				Stadium: 11 June Stadium

15 July 2001 World Cup qualification	Togo	2–0	Libya	Lomé, Togo
				Stadium: Stade de Kégué

27 July 2001 World Cup qualification	Libya	2–4	Zambia	Tripoli, Libya
				Stadium: June 11 Stadium

== 2002 ==
27 August 2002 Friendly	Egypt	0–1	Libya	Alexandria, Egypt

2 September 2002 Friendly	Togo	0–4	Libya	Lomé, Togo

8 September 2002 2004 African Cup of Nations qualification	Libya	3–2	DR Congo	Misrata, Libya

13 October 2002 2004 African Cup of Nations qualification	Swaziland	2–1	Libya	Mbabane, Swaziland

== 2003 ==
12 February 2003 Friendly	Libya	2–4	Canada	Tripoli, Libya

30 March 2003 2004 African Cup of Nations qualification	Libya	0–0	Botswana	Tripoli, Libya

30 April 2003 Friendly	Libya	1–3	Argentina	Tripoli, Libya

7 June 2003 2004 African Cup of Nations qualification	Botswana	0–1	Libya	Gaborone, Botswana

22 June 2003 2004 African Cup of Nations qualification	DR Congo	2–1	Libya	Kinshasa, DR Congo

5 July 2003 2004 African Cup of Nations qualification	Libya	6–2	Swaziland	Tripoli, Libya

11 October 2003 World Cup qualification	São Tomé and Príncipe	0–1	Libya	São Tomé, São Tomé and Príncipe
				Stadium: Estádio Nacional 12 de Julho

16 November 2003 World Cup qualification	Libya	8–0	São Tomé and Príncipe	Benghazi, Libya
				Stadium: March 28 Stadium

== 2004 ==
16 January 2004 Friendly	Libya	2–0	Kenya	Zawiya, Libya

19 January 2004 Friendly	Libya	2–0	Kenya	Tripoli, Libya

18 February 2004 Friendly	Libya	1–1	Ukraine	Tripoli, Libya
				Stadium: 11 June Stadium

26 March 2004 Friendly	Libya	1–0	Qatar	Rome, Italy

30 April 2004 Friendly	Jordan	0–1	Libya	Lagos, Nigeria

30 May 2004 Friendly	Burkina Faso	3–2	Libya	Ouagadougou, Burkina Faso

6 June 2004 World Cup qualification	Ivory Coast	2–0	Libya	Abidjan, Ivory Coast

18 June 2004 World Cup qualification	Libya	0–0	Cameroon	Misrata, Libya

3 July 2004 World Cup qualification	Sudan	0–1	Libya	Khartoum, Sudan

3 September 2004 World Cup qualification	Libya	1-0	Benin	Tripoli, Libya
				Stadium: 11 June Stadium

8 October 2004 World Cup qualification	Libya	2-1	Egypt	Tripoli, Libya
				Stadium: 11 June Stadium

20 October 2004 Friendly	Libya	2–1	Nigeria	Tripoli, Libya

22 October 2004 Friendly	Libya	1–0	Jordan	Tripoli, Libya

== 2005 ==
27 March 2005 World Cup qualification	Egypt	4–1	Libya	Cairo, Egypt

27 May 2005 Friendly	Libya	1–1	Malawi	Tripoli, Libya

3 June 2005 World Cup qualification	Libya	0–0	Ivory Coast	Tripoli, Libya
				Stadium: 11 June Stadium

19 June 2005 World Cup qualification	Cameroon	1–0	Libya	Yaoundé, Cameroon
				Stadium: Stade Ahmadou Ahidjo

17 August 2005 Friendly	Libya	0–1	Nigeria	Tripoli, Libya

24 August 2005 Friendly	Iran	4–0	Libya	Tehran, Iran
				Stadium: Azadi Stadium

2 September 2005 World Cup qualification	Libya	0–0	Sudan	Tripoli, Libya
				Stadium: 11 June Stadium

9 October 2005 World Cup qualification	Benin	1–0	Libya	Cotonou, Benin
				Stadium: Stade René Pleven d'Akpakpa

16 November 2005 Friendly	Libya	2–1	DR Congo	France

2 December 2005 Friendly	United Arab Emirates	1–1	Libya	Sharjah, United Arab Emirates

== 2006 ==
2 January 2006 Friendly	Qatar	2–0	Libya	Doha, Qatar

14 January 2006 Friendly	Tunisia	1–0	Libya	Radès, Tunisia

20 January 2006 2006 Africa Cup of Nations	Egypt	3–0	Libya	Cairo, Egypt

24 January 2006 2006 Africa Cup of Nations	Libya	1–2	Ivory Coast	Cairo, Egypt

28 January 2006 2006 Africa Cup of Nations	Libya	0–0	Morocco	Cairo, Egypt

30 May 2006 Friendly	Libya	1–2	Uruguay	Radès, Tunisia

2 June 2006 Friendly	Libya	1–1 (3–1 p)	Belarus	Radès, Tunisia

5 June 2006 Friendly	Ukraine	3–0	Libya	Gossau, Switzerland
				Stadium: Sportanlage Buechenwald

5 August 2006 Friendly	Syria	2–1	Libya	Damascus, Syria
				Stadium: Abbasiyyin Stadium

16 August 2006 Friendly	Libya	3–2	Uganda	Tripoli, Libya
				Stadium: Tripoli Stadium

26 August 2006 Friendly	Yemen	0–1	Libya	Sana'a, Yemen
				Stadium: Ali Mohsen Al-Muraisi Stadium

29 August 2006 Friendly	Yemen	1–1	Libya	Sana'a, Yemen
				Stadium: Ali Mohsen Al-Muraisi Stadium

3 September 2006 AFCONQ	Ethiopia	1–0	Libya	Addis Ababa, Ethiopia
				Stadium: Addis Ababa Stadium

1 October 2006 Friendly	Libya	1–0	Sudan	Tripoli, Libya
				Stadium: Tripoli Stadium

8 October 2006 AFCONQ	Libya	1–1	DR Congo	Tripoli, Libya
				Stadium: Tripoli Stadium

15 November 2006 Friendly	Tunisia	2–0	Libya	Radès, Tunisia
				Stadium: Stade 7 November

== 2007 ==
7 February 2007 Friendly	Algeria	2–1	Libya	Algiers, Algeria

20 March 2007 Friendly	Libya	0–0	Mauritania	Tripoli, Libya

25 March 2007 AFCONQ	Libya	2–1	Namibia	Tripoli, Libya

27 May 2007 Friendly	Botswana	0–0	Libya	Gaborone, Botswana

2 June 2007 AFCONQ	Namibia	1–0	Libya	Windhoek, Namibia

17 June 2007 AFCONQ	Libya	3–1	Ethiopia	Tripoli, Libya

22 August 2007 Friendly	Sudan	1–0	Libya	Khartoum, Sudan

8 September 2007 AFCONQ	DR Congo	1–1	Libya	Kinshasa, DR Congo

16 October 2007 Friendly	Bahrain	2–0	Libya	Muharraq, Bahrain

18 November 2007 Football at the 2007 Pan Arab Games	Libya	2–1	Saudi Arabia	Ismailia, Egypt
				Stadium: Ismailia Stadium

21 November 2007 Football at the 2007 Pan Arab Games	Egypt	0–0	Libya	Port Said, Egypt
				Stadium: Port Said Stadium

== 2008 ==
26 March 2008 Friendly	Uganda	1–1	Libya	Kampala, Uganda

22 May 2008 Friendly	Libya	2–2	Zambia	Tripoli, Libya

27 May 2008 Friendly	Libya	4–2	Liberia	Tripoli, Libya

1 June 2008 World Cup qualification	Ghana	3–0	Libya	Kumasi, Ghana

1 June 2008 World Cup qualification	Libya	1–0	Gabon	Tripoli, Libya

15 June 2008 World Cup qualification	Lesotho	0–1	Libya	Bloemfontein, South Africa

20 June 2008 World Cup qualification	Libya	4–0	Lesotho	Tripoli, Libya

20 August 2008 Friendly	Libya	0–0	Senegal	Tripoli, Libya

24 August 2008 Friendly	Libya	3–0	Chad	Tripoli, Libya

28 August 2008 Friendly	Libya	6–2	Niger	Tripoli, Libya

5 September 2008 World Cup qualification	Libya	1–0	Ghana	Tripoli, Libya

11 October 2008 World Cup qualification	Gabon	1–0	Libya	Libreville, Gabon

== 2009 ==
11 February 2009 Friendly	Libya	2–3	Uruguay	Tripoli, Libya

23 February 2009 CHAN	DR Congo	2–0	Libya	Bouaké, Ivory Coast
				Stadium: Stade Bouaké

26 February 2009 CHAN	Libya	1–1	Ghana	Bouaké, Ivory Coast
				Stadium: Stade Bouaké

1 March 2009 CHAN	Zimbabwe	0–0	Libya	Abidjan, Ivory Coast
				Stadium: Stade Félix Houphouët-Boigny

5 October 2009 Friendly	Kuwait	1–1	Libya	Cairo, Egypt

== 2010 ==
6 January 2010 Friendly	Benin	1–0	Libya	Cotonou, Benin

3 March 2010 Friendly	Libya	2–1	Mali	Tripoli, Libya

13 March 2010 2011 African Nations Championship qualification	Algeria	1–0	Libya	Koléa, Algeria

18 April 2010 2011 African Nations Championship qualification	Libya	2–1	Algeria	Tripoli, Libya
				Stadium: Tripoli Stadium

5 September 2010 AFCONQ	Mozambique	0–0	Libya	Maputo, Mozambique

10 October 2010 AFCONQ	Libya	1–0	Zambia	Tripoli, Libya

17 November 2010 Friendly	Libya	1–1 (4–1 p)	Niger	Tripoli, Libya

== 2011 ==
9 February 2011 Friendly	Libya	3–2	Benin	Tripoli, Libya

28 March 2011 AFCONQ	Libya	3–0	Comoros	Bamako, Mali
				Stadium: Stade du 26 Mars

5 June 2011 AFCONQ	Comoros	1–1	Libya	Mitsamiouli, Comoros
				Stadium: Stade Said Mohamed Cheikh

3 September 2011 AFCONQ	Libya	1–0	Mozambique	Cairo, Egypt
				Stadium: Petro Sport Stadium

8 October 2011 AFCONQ	Zambia	0–0	Libya	Lusaka, Zambia

15 November 2011 Friendly	Belarus	1–1	Libya	Dubai, United Arab Emirates

11 December 2011 Football at the 2011 Pan Arab Games	Libya	0–1	Sudan	Al Rayyan, Qatar
				Stadium: Thani bin Jassim Stadium

14 December 2011 Football at the 2011 Pan Arab Games	Libya	1–1	Palestine	Al Rayyan, Qatar
				Stadium: Thani bin Jassim Stadium

17 December 2011 Football at the 2011 Pan Arab Games	Jordan	0–0	Libya	Doha, Qatar
				Stadium: Jassim bin Hamad Stadium

== 2012 ==
16 January 2012 Friendly	Ivory Coast	1–0	Libya	Abu Dhabi, United Arab Emirates

21 January 2012 2012 Africa Cup of Nations	Equatorial Guinea	1–0	Libya	Bata, Equatorial Guinea

25 January 2012 2012 Africa Cup of Nations	Libya	2–2	Zambia	Bata, Equatorial Guinea

29 January 2012 2012 Africa Cup of Nations	Libya	2–1	Senegal	Bata, Equatorial Guinea

23 May 2012 Friendly	Libya	2–0	Rwanda	Tunisia

27 May 2012 Friendly	Libya	1–0	Chad	Tunisia

3 June 2012 World Cup qualification	Togo	1–1	Libya	Lomé, Togo

10 June 2012 World Cup qualification	Libya	2–1	Cameroon	Sfax, Tunisia

23 June 2012 2012 Arab Nations Cup	Libya	3–1	Yemen	Jeddah, Saudi Arabia
				Stadium: Prince Abdullah Al Faisal Stadium

26 June 2012 2012 Arab Nations Cup	Morocco	0–0	Libya	Jeddah, Saudi Arabia
				Stadium: Prince Abdullah Al Faisal Stadium

29 June 2012 2012 Arab Nations Cup	Libya	2–1	Bahrain	Ta'if, Saudi Arabia
				Stadium: King Fahd Stadium

3 July 2012 2012 Arab Nations Cup	Saudi Arabia	0–2	Libya	Jeddah, Saudi Arabia
				Stadium: Prince Abdullah Al Faisal Stadium

6 July 2012 2012 Arab Nations Cup	Libya	1–1 (a.e.t.) (1–3 p)	Morocco	Jeddah, Saudi Arabia
				Stadium: Prince Abdullah Al Faisal Stadium

15 August 2012 Friendly	Libya	2–1	Ethiopia	Libya

9 September 2012 AFCONQ	Libya	0–1	Algeria	Casablanca, Morocco

14 October 2012 AFCONQ	Algeria	2–0	Libya	Blida, Algeria

== 2013 ==
6 February 2013 Friendly	Kenya	3–0	Libya	Sfax, Tunisia

20 March 2013 Friendly	Rwanda	0–1	Libya	Kigali, Rwanda

24 March 2013 World Cup qualification	DR Congo	0–0	Libya	Kinshasa, DR Congo
				Stadium: Stade des Martyrs

13 May 2013 Friendly	Libya	2–0	Mauritania	Tripoli, Libya
				Stadium: Tripoli Stadium

27 May 2013 Friendly	Jordan	1–0	Libya	Amman, Jordan

1 June 2013 Friendly	Libya	3–0	Uganda	Tripoli, Libya
				Stadium: Tripoli Stadium

7 June 2013 World Cup qualification	Libya	0–0	DR Congo	Tripoli, Libya
				Stadium: Tripoli Stadium

14 June 2013 World Cup qualification	Libya	2–0	Togo	Tripoli, Libya
				Stadium: Tripoli Stadium

9 August 2013 Friendly	Jordan	2–1	Libya	Amman, Jordan

14 August 2013 Friendly	Libya	0–0	Central African Republic	Tripoli, Libya
				Stadium: Tripoli Stadium

30 August 2013 Friendly	Libya	1–0	Ghana	Tunisia

4 September 2013 Friendly	Equatorial Guinea	1–1	Libya	Malabo, Equatorial Guinea

8 September 2013 World Cup qualification	Cameroon	1–0	Libya	Yaoundé, Cameroon

15 November 2013 Friendly	Libya	1–1	Niger	Tunisia

18 November 2013 Friendly	Libya	1–0	Benin	Tunisia

14 December 2013 Friendly	Libya	1–0	Mali	Morocco

== 2014 ==
13 January 2014 CHAN	Libya	2–0	Ethiopia	South Africa

17 January 2014 CHAN	Ghana	1–1	Libya	South Africa

21 January 2014 CHAN	Congo	2–2	Libya	South Africa

26 January 2014 CHAN	Gabon	1–1 (a.e.t.) (2–4 p)	Libya	South Africa

29 January 2014 CHAN	Zimbabwe	0–0 (a.e.t.) (4–5 p)	Libya	South Africa

1 February 2014 CHAN	Libya	0–0 (a.e.t.) (4–3 p)	Ghana	South Africa

5 March 2014 Friendly	Congo	0–0	Libya	Tunis, Tunisia

18 May 2014 AFCONQ	Libya	0–0	Rwanda	Radès, Tunisia

31 May 2014 AFCONQ	Rwanda	3–0	Libya	Kigali, Rwanda

7 September 2014 Friendly	Morocco	3–0	Libya	Marrakesh, Morocco
				Stadium: Marrakesh Stadium

== 2015 ==
6 June 2015 Friendly	Mali	2–2	Libya	Morocco

12 June 2015 AFCONQ	Morocco	1–0	Libya	Morocco

18 June 2015 2016 African Nations Championship qualification	Libya	1–0	Tunisia	Morocco

21 June 2015 2016 African Nations Championship qualification	Morocco	3–0	Libya	Morocco

28 August 2015 Friendly	Libya	2–1	Tanzania	Turkey

6 September 2015 AFCONQ	Libya	1–2	Cape Verde	Egypt

19 October 2015 2016 African Nations Championship qualification	Tunisia	1–0	Libya	Tunisia

22 October 2015 2016 African Nations Championship qualification	Libya	0–4	Morocco	Tunisia

13 November 2015 World Cup qualification	Libya	1–0	Rwanda	Tunisia

17 November 2015 World Cup qualification	Rwanda	1–3	Libya	Kigali, Rwanda

== 2016 ==
29 January 2016 Friendly	Egypt	2–0	Libya	Aswan, Egypt

23 March 2016 AFCONQ	São Tomé and Príncipe	2–1	Libya	São Tomé and Príncipe

28 March 2016 AFCONQ	Libya	4–0	São Tomé and Príncipe	Blida, Algeria

3 June 2016 AFCONQ	Libya	1–1	Morocco	Tunisia

3 September 2016 AFCONQ	Cape Verde	0–1	Libya	Cape Verde

8 October 2016 World Cup qualification	DR Congo	4–0	Libya	DR Congo

11 November 2016 World Cup qualification	Libya	0–1	Tunisia	Cairo, Egypt

== 2017 ==
8 January 2017 Friendly	Libya	1–2	Senegal	Congo

24 March 2017 Friendly	Libya	0–0	Togo	Egypt

5 June 2017 Friendly	Egypt	1–0	Libya	Egypt

9 June 2017 AFCONQ	Libya	5–1	Seychelles	Cairo, Egypt
22:00 UTC+2	Saltou 22'; Benali 26' (pen.); Elhouni 45+1'; Zubya 65'; Ellafi 82'		Coralie 90'	Stadium: Petro Sport Stadium; Referee: Baba Leno (Guinea)

12 August 2017 2018 African Nations Championship qualification	Algeria	1–2	Libya	Algeria
20:45 UTC+1	Darfalou 1'		Rahmani 6' (o.g.); Ellafi 48'	Stadium: Mohamed Hamlaoui Stadium, Constantine; Referee: Samir Guezzaz (Morocco)

18 August 2017 2018 African Nations Championship qualification	Libya	1–1	Algeria	Sfax, Tunisia
19:00 UTC+1	Ellafi 45'		Bendebka 23'	Stadium: Stade Taïeb Mhiri; Referee: Amin Mohamed Omar (Egypt)

31 August 2017 World Cup qualification	Guinea	3–2	Libya	Conakry, Guinea
	N. Keïta 8'; D. Camara 23'; Alk. Bangoura 90+2'		Sabbou 87'; Zuway 88'	Stadium: Stade du 28 Septembre; Attendance: 13,750; Referee: Souleiman Ahmed Djama (Djibouti)

4 September 2017 World Cup qualification	Libya	1–0	Guinea	Monastir, Tunisia
	Elhouni 36'			Stadium: Stade Mustapha Ben Jannet; Attendance: 1,500; Referee: Abou Coulibaly (Ivory Coast)

7 October 2017 World Cup qualification	Libya	1–2	DR Congo	Monastir, Tunisia
	Elmusrati 68'		Bakambu 50'; Mubele 74'	Stadium: Stade Mustapha Ben Jannet; Attendance: 750; Referee: Malang Diedhiou (Senegal)

11 November 2017 World Cup qualification	Tunisia	0–0	Libya	Radès, Tunisia
				Stadium: Stade Olympique de Radès; Attendance: 56,000; Referee: Hamada Nampiandraza (Madagascar)

3 December 2017 2017 CECAFA Cup	Libya	0–0	Tanzania	Machakos, Kenya
				Stadium: Kenyatta Stadium

5 December 2017 2017 CECAFA Cup	Kenya	0–0	Libya	Machakos, Kenya
				Stadium: Kenyatta Stadium

7 December 2017 2017 CECAFA Cup	Rwanda	0–0	Libya	Machakos, Kenya
				Stadium: Kenyatta Stadium

11 December 2017 2017 CECAFA Cup	Libya	1–0	Zanzibar	Machakos, Kenya
				Stadium: Kenyatta Stadium

25 December 2017 Friendly	Jordan	1–1	Libya	Amman, Jordan

== 2018 ==
15 January 2018 CHAN	Libya	3–0	Equatorial Guinea	Tangier, Morocco
	Al Taher 11', 16'; Alharaish 86'			Stadium: Stade Ibn Batouta; Referee: Mahamadou Keita (Mali)

19 January 2018 CHAN	Libya	0–1	Nigeria	Tangier, Morocco
			Faleye 79'	Stadium: Stade Ibn Batouta; Referee: Mustapha Ghorbal (Algeria)

23 January 2018 CHAN	Rwanda	0–1	Libya	Tangier, Morocco
			Abushnaf 90+2'	Stadium: Stade Ibn Batouta; Referee: Noureddine El Jaafari (Morocco)

28 January 2018 CHAN	Congo	1–1 (3–5 p)	Libya	Agadir, Morocco
	Makiesse 32'		Al Taher 14'	Stadium: Stade Adrar; Referee: Hamada Nampiandraza (Madagascar)
	Penalties
	Kibamba (penalty scored); Mboungou (penalty scored); Mouko (penalty missed); Rozan (penalty scored)		(penalty scored) Taktak; (penalty scored) Khalleefah; (penalty scored) Alaqoub; (penalty scored) Al-Maghasi; (penalty scored) Masaud

31 January 2018 CHAN	Morocco	3–1 (a.e.t.)	Libya	Casablanca, Morocco
	El Kaabi 73', 97'; El Karti 119' (pen.)		Khalleefah 86'	Stadium: Stade Mohammed V Referee: Janny Sikazwe (Zambia)

3 February 2018 CHAN	Libya	1–1 (2–4 p)	Sudan	Marrakesh, Morocco
	Ablo 84'		Walaa Eldin 6'	Stadium: Marrakesh Stadium; Referee: Mehdi Abid Charef (Algeria)
	Penalties
	Taktak (penalty scored); Elhouni (penalty missed); Alaqoub (penalty scored); Ablo (penalty missed)		(penalty scored) M. El Tahir; (penalty scored) A. El Tahir; (penalty scored) Ahmed; (penalty scored) Maaz

8 September 2018 AFCONQ	South Africa	0–0	Libya	Durban, South Africa
15:00 UTC+2				Stadium: Moses Mabhida Stadium; Referee: Sidi Alioum (Cameroon)

13 October 2018 AFCONQ	Nigeria	4–0	Libya	Uyo, Nigeria
16:00 UTC+1	Ighalo 4' (pen.), 57', 68'; Kalu 89'			Stadium: Godswill Akpabio International Stadium; Referee: Jean-Jacques Ndala Ngambo (DR Congo)

16 October 2018 AFCONQ	Libya	2–3	Nigeria	Sfax, Tunisia
19:00 UTC+1	Zubya 35'; Benali 74'		Ighalo 14', 81'; Musa 17'	Stadium: Stade Taïeb Mhiri; Referee: Joshua Bondo (Botswana)

17 November 2018 AFCONQ	Seychelles	1–8	Libya	Victoria, Seychelles
16:30 SCT (UTC+4)	Monnaie 72'		Sabbou 3'; Saltou 21', 32', 62'; Majdi 56'; Elmslaty 59'; Al-Shadi 85'; Elhouni 90+3'	Stadium: Stade Linité; Referee: Ali Adelaïd (Comoros)

== 2019 ==
24 March 2019 2019 AFCONQ	Libya	1–2	South Africa	Sfax, Tunisia
18:00 CET (UTC+1)	Benali 66' (pen.)	Report	Tau 50', 69'	Stadium: Stade Taïeb Mhiri; Referee: Noureddine El Jaafari (Morocco)

11 October 2019 Friendly	Morocco	1–1	Libya	Oujda, Morocco
19:00 (UTC+1)	El Yamiq 20'	Report	Al Warfali 42'	Stadium: Honneur Stadium; Attendance: 25,000

15 October 2019 Friendly	Mauritania	0–0	Libya	Nouakchott, Mauritania
18:00		Report		Stadium: Stade Cheikha Ould Boïdiya; Referee: Boubou Traoré (Mali)

15 November 2019 2021 AFCONQ	Tunisia	4–1	Libya	Radès, Tunisia
20:00 UTC+1	Khazri 33', 90'; Khaoui 41', 52'		Elhouni 45+1'	Stadium: Stade Olympique de Radès

19 November 2019 2021 AFCONQ	Libya	5-3	Tanzania	Monastir, Tunisia
20:00 UTC+1	Al Warfali 68' (pen.); Saltou 81'		Samatta 18' (pen.)	Stadium: Stade Mustapha Ben Jannet
