= Emmanuel Asante =

Emmanuel Asante may refer to:

- Emmanuel Asante (footballer)
- Emmanuel Asante (theologian)
