= Miracle Club =

Miracle Club may refer to:

- Miracle Club de Bandrani, a football club in the Comoros islands
- The Miracle Club, a 2023 comedy-drama film
