= Alfeus Handura =

Namibian footballer

Personal information
- Date of birth: 1 August 1993 (age 33)
- Place of birth: Okondjatu, Namibia
- Height: 1.89 m (6 ft 2 1/2 in)
- Position: Defensive midfielder

Team information
- Current team: African Stars

Senior career*
Years	Team	Apps	(Gls)
2008–2016	Tura Magic		
2016–	African Stars		

International career
2011–2022	Namibia	15	(0)
- * Club domestic league appearances and goals as of 20:47, 9 October 2020 (UTC)

Alfeus Handura (born 1 August 1993) is a Namibian footballer who plays as a defensive midfielder for African Stars and the Namibia national football team.

== Career statistics ==
=== International ===
Appearances and goals by national team and year
National team	Year	Apps	Goals
Egypt	2011	2	0
Egypt	2012	–	
Egypt	2013	–	
Egypt	2014	–	
Egypt	2015	–	
Egypt	2016	–	
Egypt	2017	–	
Egypt	2018	–	
Egypt	2019	–	
Egypt	2020	2	0
Egypt	2021	10	0
Egypt	2022	1	0
Total		15	0
