= Amos Frimpong =

Ghanaian footballer

Personal information
- Date of birth: 18 November 1991 (age 34)
- Place of birth: Kumasi, Ghana
- Position: Right back

Team information
- Current team: Asante Kotoko

Senior career*
Years	Team	Apps	(Gls)
2010–2011	BA Stars		
2011–	Asante Kotoko		

International career^{‡}
2017–	Ghana	3	(0)
- * Club domestic league appearances and goals ‡ National team caps and goals as of 28 March 2020

Amos Frimpong is an association footballer who plays right back for Asante Kotoko in the Ghana Premier League. He is currently the captain of the team. Amos was bought to fill in for the departing of Yaw Frimpong to TP Mazembe.
