= Mike Katiba =

Zambian footballer (born 1995)

Personal information
- Date of birth: 7 July 1995 (age 31)
- Place of birth: Lusaka
- Position: Midfielder

Team information
- Current team: Green Buffaloes

Senior career*
Years	Team	Apps	(Gls)
–2014	Kalulushi Modern Stars		
2015–2016	Mufulira Wanderers		
2017–	Green Buffaloes		

International career^{‡}
2017–	Zambia	9	(0)
- * Club domestic league appearances and goals ‡ National team caps and goals as of 7 November 2019

Mike Katiba (born 7 July 1995) is a Zambian football midfielder for Green Buffaloes.
