= 2019 Africa Cup of Nations qualification Group E =

Group E of the 2019 Africa Cup of Nations qualification tournament was one of the twelve groups to decide the teams which qualified for the 2019 Africa Cup of Nations finals tournament. The group consisted of four teams: Nigeria, South Africa, Libya, and Seychelles.

The teams played against each other in home-and-away round-robin format between June 2017 and March 2019.

Nigeria and South Africa, the group winners and runners-up respectively, qualified for the 2019 Africa Cup of Nations.

== Standings ==
Pos	Team	Pld	W	D	L	GF	GA	GD	Pts	Qualification	Nigeria national football team	South Africa national soccer team	Libya national football team	Seychelles national football team
1	Nigeria	6	4	1	1	14	6	+8	13	Final tournament	—	0–2	4–0	3–1
2	South Africa	6	3	3	0	11	2	+9	12	Final tournament	1–1	—	0–0	6–0
3	Libya	6	2	1	3	16	11	+5	7		2–3	1–2	—	5–1
4	Seychelles	6	0	1	5	3	25	−22	1		0–3	0–0	1–8	—

Source: CAF
Rules for classification: Qualification tiebreakers

== Matches ==
9 June 2017
22:00 UTC+2

Libya	5–1	Seychelles
Saltou 22'; Benali 26' (pen.); Elhouni 45+1'; Zubya 65'; Ellafi 82'	Report	Coralie 90'

Petro Sport Stadium, Cairo (Egypt) (Note: Libya played their home matches outside Libya due to security concerns from the ongoing civil war.)
Referee: Baba Leno (Guinea)
10 June 2017
17:00 UTC+1

Nigeria	0–2	South Africa
	Report	Rantie 54'; Tau 81'

Godswill Akpabio International Stadium, Uyo
Referee: Youssef Essrayri (Tunisia)

8 September 2018
16:30 UTC+4

Seychelles	0–3	Nigeria
	Report	Musa 14'; Awaziem 33'; Ighalo 57' (pen.)

Stade Linité, Victoria
Referee: Davies Omweno (Kenya)
8 September 2018
15:00 UTC+2

South Africa	0–0	Libya
	Report

Moses Mabhida Stadium, Durban
Referee: Sidi Alioum (Cameroon)

13 October 2018
15:00 UTC+2

South Africa	6–0	Seychelles
Hoareau 22' (o.g.); Hlatshwayo 24'; Mothiba 26'; Tau 73'; Ndlovu 80'; Mokoena 90+2'	Report

FNB Stadium, Johannesburg
Referee: Ring Nyier Akech Malong (South Sudan)
13 October 2018
16:00 UTC+1

Nigeria	4–0	Libya
Ighalo 4' (pen.), 57', 68'; Kalu 89'	Report

Godswill Akpabio International Stadium, Uyo
Referee: Jean-Jacques Ndala (DR Congo)

16 October 2018
17:30 UTC+4

Seychelles	0–0	South Africa
	Report

Stade Linité, Victoria
Referee: Mfaume Ali Nassoro (Tanzania)
16 October 2018
19:00 UTC+1

Libya	2–3	Nigeria
Zubya 34'; Benali 73'	Report	Ighalo 13', 80'; Musa 16'

Stade Taïeb Mhiri, Sfax (Tunisia)
Referee: Joshua Bondo (Botswana)

17 November 2018
16:30 UTC+4

Seychelles	1–8	Libya
Monnaie 71'	Report	Sabbou 2'; Saltou 20', 31', 62'; Majdi 55'; Elmslaty 58'; Al-Shadi 85'; Elhouni 90+2'

Stade Linité, Victoria
Referee: Ali Adelaïd (Comoros)
17 November 2018
15:00 UTC+2

South Africa	1–1	Nigeria
Mothiba 25'	Report	Mkhwanazi 9' (o.g.)

FNB Stadium, Johannesburg
Referee: Bakary Gassama (Gambia)

22 March 2019
16:00 UTC+1

Nigeria	3–1	Seychelles
Ighalo 35' (pen.); Onyekuru 50'; Simon 90+1'	Report	Melanie 41'

Stephen Keshi Stadium, Asaba
Referee: Fabricio Duarte (Cape Verde)
24 March 2019
18:00 UTC+1

Libya	1–2	South Africa
Benali 66' (pen.)	Report	Tau 50', 69'

Stade Taïeb Mhiri, Sfax (Tunisia)
Referee: Noureddine El Jaafari (Morocco)

== Goalscorers ==
There were 44 goals scored in 12 matches, for an average of 3.67 goals per match.

7 goals

- (Nigeria) Odion Ighalo

4 goals

- (Libya) Anis Saltou
- (South Africa) Percy Tau

3 goals

- (Libya) Ahmad Benali

2 goals

- (Libya) Hamdou Elhouni
- (Libya) Mohamed Zubya
- (Nigeria) Ahmed Musa
- (South Africa) Lebo Mothiba

1 goal

- (Libya) Rabi Al-Shadi
- (Libya) Muaid Ellafi
- (Libya) Salem Elmslaty
- (Libya) Khaled Majdi
- (Libya) Motasem Sabbou
- (Nigeria) Chidozie Awaziem
- (Nigeria) Samuel Kalu
- (Nigeria) Henry Onyekuru
- (Nigeria) Moses Simon
- (Seychelles) Leroy Coralie
- (Seychelles) Rody Melanie
- (Seychelles) Perry Monnaie
- (South Africa) Thulani Hlatshwayo
- (South Africa) Teboho Mokoena
- (South Africa) Dino Ndlovu
- (South Africa) Tokelo Rantie

1 own goal

- (Seychelles) Nigel Hoareau (against South Africa)
- (South Africa) Buhle Mkhwanazi (against Nigeria)
