= David Mbaihouloum =

Chadian footballer (born 1989)

Personal information
- Date of birth: 17 February 1989 (age 37)
- Place of birth: Fianga, Chad
- Height: 1.73 m (5 ft 8 in)
- Position: Midfielder

Senior career*
Years	Team	Apps	(Gls)
- AS CotonTchad

International career
2008–2010	Chad	3	(0)
- * Club domestic league appearances and goals

David Mbaihouloum (born 17 February 1989) is a Chadian footballer who plays as a midfielder for AS CotonTchad. He earned three caps for the Chad national football team. and was called up for qualifying matches for 2012 Africa Cup of Nations.
