= Bright Silas =

Nigerian footballer

Personal information
- Full name: Bright Silas
- Date of birth: 19 November 1992 (age 33)
- Place of birth: Akwa Ibom State, Nigeria
- Height: 1.85 m (6 ft 1 in)
- Position: Midfielder

Team information
- Current team: → Kano Pillars

Senior career*
Years	Team	Apps	(Gls)
2016–2017	Plateau United F.C.	2	(1)
2017-2019	Enugu Rangers		
2019-	Kano Pillars		
- * Club domestic league appearances and goals

Bright Silas (born 19 November 1992) is a Nigerian professional footballer for Kano Pillars. He currently plays as an attacking midfielder for the Kano Pillars. He formerly played for Plateau United F.C. in 2016. In April 2017, he signed a deal with Enugu Rangers. On 20 June 2019 El Entag El Harby SC Of Egypt signed Silas from Enugu Rangers. On 1 July 2019 Kano Pillars signed Silas and offered him a deal.

Silas has also played at the CAF Confederation Cup in 2018.
