= Emmanuel Asante (footballer) =

Ghanaian footballer

Personal information
- Full name: Emmanuel Atta Nyamaa Asante
- Date of birth: May 2, 1995 (age 31)
- Place of birth: Tafo, Ghana
- Position: Left back

Team information
- Current team: Bechem United
- Number: 19

Youth career
- 2010–2012: Bechem United

Senior career*
Years	Team	Apps	(Gls)
2013	Bechem United	3+	(0)
2014–2017	Asante Kotoko S.C.	15	(0)
2017	Great Olympics.	9	(0)
2017–2019	DC Motema Pembe		
2019–	Bechem United	23	(0)

International career
2015	Ghana	1	(0)
- * Club domestic league appearances and goals

Emmanuel Atta Nyamaa Asante (born 2 May 1995) is a Ghanaian professional footballer who currently plays as a defender for Bechem United in the Ghana Premier League.

== Career ==
Emmanuel Asante started his career with Bechem United. He has played for several Ghanaian teams including Asante Kotoko S.C. and Accra Great Olympics. He also played for Daring Club Motema Pembe in DR Congo.

== International career ==
In November 2013, coach Maxwell Konadu invited him to be a part of the Ghana squad for the 2013 WAFU Nations Cup. He helped the team to a first-place finish after Ghana beat Senegal by three goals to one.
