= Perry Monnaie =

Seychellois association football player

Personal information
- Full name: Perry Monnaie
- Date of birth: 15 May 1997 (age 29)
- Place of birth: Seychelles
- Position: Striker

Team information
- Current team: La Passe FC

International career^{‡}
Years	Team	Apps	(Gls)
2018–	Seychelles	8	(4)
- ‡ National team caps and goals as of 11 May 2019

Perry Monnaie (born May 15, 1997) is a Seychellois football player. He is a striker playing for La Passe FC and the Seychelles national football team. He has represented Seychelles in the AFCON 2018.

== International career ==
=== International goals ===
Scores and results list Seychelles' goal tally first.

No.	Date	Venue	Opponent	Score	Result	Competition
1.	17 November 2018	Stade Linité, Victoria, Seychelles	Libya	1–5	1–8	2019 Africa Cup of Nations qualification
2.	11 May 2019	Stade Linité, Victoria, Seychelles	Botswana	1–1	1–3	2020 African Nations Championship qualification
3.	18 January 2020	Bangabandhu National Stadium, Dhaka, Bangladesh	Burundi	1–0	1–3	2020 Bangabandhu Cup
4.	20 January 2020	Bangabandhu National Stadium, Dhaka, Bangladesh	Mauritius	2–0	2–2	2020 Bangabandhu Cup
