= Ahmad Benali =

Footballer (born 1992)

Personal information
- Date of birth: 7 February 1992 (age 34)
- Place of birth: Manchester, England
- Height: 1.73 m (5 ft 8 in)
- Positions: Central midfielder; attacking midfielder

Youth career
- 2001–2010: Manchester City

Senior career*
Years	Team	Apps	(Gls)
2010–2012	Manchester City	0	(0)
2011–2012	→ Rochdale (loan)	2	(0)
2012–2015	Brescia	79	(13)
2015–2016	Palermo	0	(0)
2015–2016	→ Pescara (loan)	35	(4)
2016–2018	Pescara	48	(10)
2017–2018	→ Crotone (loan)	10	(1)
2018–2022	Crotone	80	(14)
2022	→ Pisa (loan)	14	(1)
2022–2023	Brescia	13	(0)
2023–2025	Bari	77	(2)
2025–2026	Virtus Entella	10	(0)

International career^{‡}
2008–2009	England U17	5	(0)
2012–2017	Libya	8	(3)
- * Club domestic league appearances and goals as of 31 January 2026 ‡ National team caps and goals as of 16 October 2018

Ahmad Benali (Arabic: أحمد بن علي; born 7 February 1992) is a professional footballer who plays as a central midfielder. Born in England, he represents Libya internationally.

== Club career ==
=== Manchester City ===
Benali started his career in the youth team of Manchester City since joining the club at eight, and signed his first professional contract on his 17th birthday. While at the Manchester City youth team, Benali was given the captaincy.

On 31 August 2011, Benali was loaned out to League One club Rochdale, along with his former teammate David Ball, until 1 January 2012. After being absent from the first team for a month, Benali made his Rochdale debut on 4 October 2011, where he made his first start and played 72 minutes, in a 1–1 draw against Scunthorpe United in the second round of the Football League Trophy and progressed through to the next round after winning 3–1 in the penalty shoot–out. Benali then made his league debut eleven days later on 15 October 2011, where he provided assist for Gary Jones, in a 2–2 draw against Colchester United. After making two appearances for Rochdale, Benali returned to his parent club in late–December when it came to an end.

At the end of the 2011–12 season, Benali was released by Manchester City following the end of his contract. By the time he was released, Benali had made no appearances for the club.

=== Brescia ===
After leaving Manchester City, Benali played abroad for the first time, moving to Italy to join Serie B club Brescia in the summer of 2012.

Benali made his Brescia Calcio debut, where he played 77 minutes, in a 2–1 loss against Cremonese in the second round of Coppa Italia. Benali made his league debut for Brescia debut, where he came on as a substitute in the 88th minute, in a 4–2 loss against Novara Calcio. Benali went on to make nine appearances in his first season at Brescia, with injuries restricted his appearance.

In the 2013–14 season, Benali regained his first-team place at the club and scored his first goal of the season in a 4–1 win over Cittadella on 19 October 2013. Then on 9 November 2014, Benali was sent–off in the 77th minute, in a 2–0 loss against Avellino. This was his return after earning a yellow card for the fourth time against AS Siena on 1 November 2013. Benali then scored his second goal on 26 December 2013, in a 2–1 win over Juve Stabia and his third goal came on 29 March 2014, in a 2–1 loss against Siena. Benali scored his fourth goal in another encounter, in a 4–1 win against Juve Stabia on 25 May 2014. Benali went on to make thirty–six appearances and scoring nine times for the club in the 2013–14 season.

In the 2014–15 season, Benali started well when he remained in the first team and scored his first goal of the season in a 2 –1 win over Pro Vercelli. Benali then scored three goals in three games between 28 October 2014 and 6 November 2014 against Crotone, Trapani and Pescara. Benali went on to score five more goals later in the season against Virtus Entella, Varese, Vicenza, Catania and Bari. Despite being suspended three times, Benali went on to make thirty-six appearances and score nine times for the club in the 2014–15 season.

However, at the end of the 2014–15 season, Benali's contract at Brescia was due to expire, and the club began experiencing financial problems. Benali had attracted interests from Inter Milan, Sampdoria, Sassuolo, Chievo, Celtic and Everton.

=== Palermo ===
In the summer of 2015, after three seasons playing for Brescia, he moved to the Serie A club Palermo on a free transfer, signing a four-year contract.

However, Benali struggled to make a break into Palermo's first team and was expected to be loaned out by Manager Maurizio Zamparini.

=== Pescara ===
Shortly after joining Palermo, Benali was loaned out Pescara immediately until the end of the 2015–16 season on 29 August 2015.

Benali made his Pescara debut in the opening game of the season, making his first start, in a 4–0 loss against Livorno. Benali established himself in the first team at Pescara and scored his first Pescara goal on 17 October 2015, in a 3–0 win over Trapani. Benali's second goal came on 24 January 2016, in a 4–0 win over Perugia. Benali then scored his third goal of the season, in a 5–2 loss against Pro Vercelli on 5 March 2016. However, Benali was sent–off on 2 April 2016, in a 2–1 win over Calcio Como and was banned for four matches as a result. After serving four matches, Benali returned to the first team and scored after two weeks from his return, in a 5–2 win over Modena on 14 May 2016. Benali then played a role for the club when he scored in the first leg of the promotion play-offs, in a 2–0 win over Trapani and the club would go on to be promoted to Serie A after drawing 1–1. Benali went on to finish the 2015–16 season at Pescara, making thirty–time appearance and scoring five times.

Having previously stated he would like to join Pescara on permanently, Benali got his wish to join the club on 9 June 2016, shortly after the club's promotion to Serie A. and was given a number ten shirt ahead of the 2016–17 season. Benali scored his first Serie A goal, in the opening game of the season, in a 2–2 draw against Napoli.

=== Crotone ===
Benali joined Crotone towards the end of the 2017–18 campaign. Across four eventful seasons, he was promoted to Serie A twice but also relegated twice. His departure from the club in January 2022 was precipitated by a rift with coach Francesco Modesto, who attributed blame for the club's poor performance on club captain Benali and another senior player, Salvatore Molina.

==== Loan to Pisa ====
On 26 January 2022, he joined Pisa on loan until the end of the 2021–22 season, with an option and a conditional obligation to buy.

=== Return to Brescia ===
On 26 August 2022, Benali returned to Brescia.

=== Bari ===
On 31 January 2023, Benali signed a 1.5-year contract with Bari.

=== Virtus Entella ===
On 1 August 2025, Benali moved to Virtus Entella in Serie B. On 2 February 2026, his contract was mutually terminated.

== International career ==
Although Benali played for England U17 five times, he declared his allegiance to Libya. He made his debut with Libya on 23 May 2012, in the friendly played against Rwanda. By October 2019 he was national team captain. He has now retired from International Football.

== Style of play ==
In response to his playing style in an interview with Umbro, Benali said: "I'm an attacking midfielder, I like to get forward and support the attack rather than the other side of midfield! Maybe a bit similar to someone like Kaka – I don't have a nickname like his, though! Mine's Ammo."

Italian media based Fanta Magazine said of his playing style, quoting: "Benali prefers to play as a midfielder but if necessary can also be used as a central midfielder or even as a playmaker. In addition, Benali can be used as a technical midfielder, whose athleticism can help make an important contribution in defence despite his lack of height at 173cm. Benali is also a good dribbler, who can take a shot from distance and has very strong offensive skills."

== Personal life ==
Born in Manchester, England, Benali was born to a Libyan father and a British mother and is a Muslim, he also has a younger sister, Layla. Regarding to his nationality, he said he considered himself to be Libyan. Benali has four children: a daughter, and three sons.

== Career statistics ==
=== Club ===
As of 22 August 2023

Appearances and goals by club, season and competition
Club	Season	League			National cup		Continental		Other		Total	
Club	Season	Division	Apps	Goals	Apps	Goals	Apps	Goals	Apps	Goals	Apps	Goals
Manchester City	2011–12	Premier League	0	0	0	0	0	0	0	0	0	0
Rochdale (loan)	2011–12	League One	2	0	1	0	–		–		3	0
Brescia	2012–13	Serie B	9	0	1	0	–		1	0	11	0
Brescia	2013–14	Serie B	34	4	2	0	–		–		36	4
Brescia	2014–15	Serie B	36	9	3	0	–		–		39	9
Brescia	Total		79	13	6	0	–		1	0	86	13
Palermo	2015–16	Serie A	0	0	0	0	–		–		0	0
Pescara	2015–16	Serie B	35	4	0	0	–		4	1	39	5
Pescara	2016–17	Serie A	33	6	1	0	–		–		34	6
Pescara	2017–18	Serie B	15	4	1	1	–		–		16	5
Pescara	Total		83	14	2	1	–		4	1	89	16
Crotone (loan)	2017–18	Serie A	10	1	0	0	–		–		10	1
Crotone	2018–19	Serie B	23	5	2	0	–		–		25	5
Crotone	2019–20	Serie B	28	7	2	0	–		–		30	7
Crotone	2020–21	Serie A	18	0	0	0	–		–		18	0
Crotone	2021–22	Serie B	11	2	1	0	–		–		12	2
Crotone	Total		90	15	5	0	–		–		95	15
Pisa (loan)	2021–22	Serie B	17	2	0	0	–		–		17	2
Brescia	2022–23	Serie B	13	0	0	0	–		–		13	0
Bari	2022–23	Serie B	13	0	0	0	–		–		13	0
Bari	2023–24	Serie B	1	0	1	0	–		–		2	0
Bari	Total		14	0	1	0	–		–		15	0
Career total			298	44	15	1	0	0	5	1	318	48

=== International ===
As of match played 10 November 2019
Scores and results list Libya's goal tally first, score column indicates score after each Benali goal.

List of international goals scored by Ahmad Benali
No.	Date	Venue	Opponent	Score	Result	Competition
1	9 June 2017	Petro Sport Stadium, New Cairo, Egypt	Seychelles	2–0	5–1	2019 Africa Cup of Nations qualification
2	16 October 2018	Stade Taïeb Mhiri, Sfax, Tunisia	Nigeria	2–2	2–3	2019 Africa Cup of Nations qualification
3	24 March 2019	Stade Taïeb Mhiri, Sfax, Tunisia	South Africa	1–1	1–2	2019 Africa Cup of Nations qualification
