= Anis Saltou =

Libyan footballer (born 1992)

Aniss Saltou
Personal information
- Full name: Anis Mohamed Jumaa Saltou
- Date of birth: 1 April 1992 (age 34)
- Place of birth: Libya
- Height: 1.97 m (6 ft 6 in)
- Position: Forward

Senior career*
Years	Team	Apps	(Gls)
2013-2014	Al-Madina SC		
2014-2017	Al Ahli Tripoli		
2017-2020	Etoile du Sahel	18	(6)
2017	→ Al Ahli Tripoli (loan)	11	(5)
2020	Al Ittihad Alexandria Club		
2020–2021	FUS Rabat	2	(2)
2021–2025	Al Ahli Tripoli	27	(16)

International career
2013–2023	Libya	23	(7)
Medal record
Men's football
Representing Libya
African Nations Championship
Winner	2014 South Africa
- * Club domestic league appearances and goals as of 18 April 2025

Anis Mohamed Jumaa Saltou (born 1 April 1992), known as Anis Saltou, is a Libyan professional footballer who plays as a forward.

== Honours ==
Libya

- African Nations Championship: 2014
