= Motasem Sabbou =

Libyan footballer (born 1993)

Personal information
- Full name: Motasem Masaud Sabbou
- Date of birth: 20 August 1993 (age 33)
- Place of birth: Libya
- Height: 1.83 m (6 ft 0 in)
- Position: Defender

Team information
- Current team: Al-Ittihad Tripoli
- Number: 5

Senior career*
| Years | Team | Apps | (Gls) |
| 2013–2020 | Al-Ittihad Tripoli | ? | (?) |
| 2020–2021 | Monastir | 31 | (2) |
| 2021–2023 | Al-Ittihad Tripoli | ? | (?) |
| 2025- | Al-Ittihad Tripoli | 9 | (0) |

International career^{‡}
| 2013– | Libya | 64 | (2) |
Medal record
Men's football
Representing Libya
African Nations Championship
| Winner | 2014 South Africa |
- * Club domestic league appearances and goals ‡ National team caps and goals as of 20 August 2026

Motasem Masaud Sabbou (born 20 August 1993) is a Libyan football player who plays for the Libyan national football team.

== Career statistics ==
=== International ===
As of match played 25 March 2025

Appearances and goals by national team and year
| National team | Year | Apps | Goals |
|---|---|---|---|
| Libya | 2013 | 3 | 0 |
| Libya | 2014 | 7 | 0 |
| Libya | 2015 | 6 | 0 |
| Libya | 2016 | 4 | 0 |
| Libya | 2017 | 14 | 1 |
| Libya | 2018 | 7 | 1 |
| Libya | 2019 | 6 | 0 |
| Libya | 2020 | 2 | 0 |
| Libya | 2021 | 10 | 0 |
| Libya | 2022 | 4 | 0 |
| Libya | 2023 | – | |
| Libya | 2024 | – | |
| Libya | 2025 | 1 | 0 |
| Total | | 64 | 2 |

Scores and results list Libya's goal tally first, score column indicates score after each Sabbou goal.

List of international goals scored by Motasem Sabbou
| No. | Date | Venue | Opponent | Score | Result | Competition |
|---|---|---|---|---|---|---|
| 1 | 31 August 2017 | Stade du 28 Septembre, Conakry, Guinea | Guinea | 1–2 | 2–3 | 2018 FIFA World Cup qualification |
| 2 | 17 November 2018 | Stade Linité, Victoria, Seychelles | Seychelles | 1–0 | 8–1 | 2019 Africa Cup of Nations qualification |

== Honours ==
Libya

- African Nations Championship: 2014
