= Salem Elmslaty =

Libyan footballer (born 1992)

Personal information
- Full name: Salem Fathi Elmslaty
- Date of birth: 31 October 1992 (age 34)
- Place of birth: Libya
- Height: 1.83 m (6 ft 0 in)
- Position: Forward

Team information
- Current team: Al-Nasr
- Number: 30

Senior career*
Years	Team	Apps	(Gls)
2012–2014	Al-Nasr		
2014	→ Al-Ramtha (loan)		
2014–2015	Al-Baqa'a		
2015	Mansheyat Bani Hasan		
2015–2016	Zakho		
2016–2018	Al-Nasr	12	(8)
2018–2022	Al Ittihad		
2022–2023	Al Akhdar	14	(1)
2023–2024	Al Ahly	22	(3)
2024–2025	Al Ta'awon	6	(1)
2025	Asswehly	2	(0)
2025–2026	Al Sadaqa Shahat	7	(0)
2026–	Al Afriqi Derna	1	(0)

International career^{‡}
2017–	Libya	7	(1)
- * Club domestic league appearances and goals as of 24 November 2016 ‡ National team caps and goals as of 14 March 2026

Salem Fathi Elmslaty (born 31 October 1992), also spelled as Salem Al-Musallati and known widely as Salem Roma, is a Libyan footballer who plays for Libyan Premier League club Al Afriqi Derna as a striker.

== International career ==
=== International goals ===
Scores and results list Libya's goal tally first.

No.	Date	Venue	Opponent	Score	Result	Competition
1.	17 November 2018	Stade Linité, Victoria, Seychelles	Seychelles	5–0	8–1	2019 Africa Cup of Nations qualification

== Personal awards ==
Al-Nasr

- 2016 Libyan Premier League top goalscorer with 8 goals.
