= Miracle Club de Bandrani =

Comorian football club

Miracle Club de Bandrani is a football club from the Comoros based in Bandrani.

== Achievements ==
- Comoros Cup: 1

2018

== Performance in CAF competitions ==
- CAF Confederation Cup: 1 appearance

2018–19 –
