= Mohamed Zubya =

Libyan footballer (born 1989)

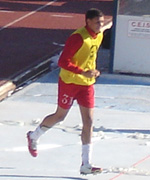
- Zubya in 2007

Personal information
- Full name: Mohamed Noureddine Abdusalam Zubya
- Date of birth: March 20, 1989 (age 37)
- Place of birth: Tripoli, Libya
- Height: 1.87 m (6 ft 2 in)
- Position: Forward

Senior career*
Years	Team	Apps	(Gls)
2005–2006	Aschat		
2006–2011	Al-Ittihad Tripoli	73	(29)
2011–2012	Al-Arabi Kuwait		
2012–2013	Partizan	4	(1)
2013–2014	JS Kabylie	11	(3)
2014–2016	MC Oran	32	(17)
2016–2017	Espérance Tunis	14	(0)
2017–2023	Al-Ittihad Tripoli		

International career
2008–2021	Libya	23	(5)
- * Club domestic league appearances and goals

Mohamed Noureddine Abdusalam Zubya (Arabic: محمد نور الدين عبد السلام زعبية; born March 20, 1989) is a Libyan retired footballer who played as a forward.

== Club career ==
Born in Tripoli, he was playing with Aschat SC when he moved in 2006 to Al-Ittihad where he stayed until 2011 and where he won 4 successive Libyan Premier League championships.

In 2007 Zubya was handed a one-year ban by CAF for trying to assault the assistant referee in his side's CAF Champions League match against FAR Rabat of Morocco. He returned after a six-month suspension and scored two goals. in the Libyan SuperCup final against Al Akhdar.

In August 2011, Zubya sign for Al Arabi Kuwait.

In June 2012, Zubya signed a four-year contract with Serbian club Partizan. He made his debut for Partizan in club's first official match of the season, on July 17, 2012, in a 2012–13 UEFA Champions League second qualifying round first-leg match, away, against Valletta. Zubya was released from his Partizan contract in January 2013.

In November 2013, Zubya sign for JS Kabylie.

He then played with Esperance Sportive de Tunis in the Tunisian Ligue Professionnelle 1.

In April 2023, Zubya was kidnapped by an armed group, says the human rights committee in Libya.

== International career ==
Zubya played for the Libyan national team in the 2010 FIFA World Cup qualifiers.

=== International goals ===
Scores and results list Libya's goal tally first.

No	Date	Venue	Opponent	Score	Result	Competition
–	30 December 2008	Thani bin Jassim Stadium, Al Rayyan, Qatar	Qatar	1–1	2–5	Unofficial friendly
1.	28 March 2016	Petro Sport Stadium, New Cairo, Egypt	São Tomé and Príncipe	1–0	4–0	2017 Africa Cup of Nations qualification
2.	28 March 2016	Petro Sport Stadium, New Cairo, Egypt	São Tomé and Príncipe	2–0	4–0	2017 Africa Cup of Nations qualification
3.	28 March 2016	Petro Sport Stadium, New Cairo, Egypt	São Tomé and Príncipe	4–0	4–0	2017 Africa Cup of Nations qualification
4.	9 June 2017	Petro Sport Stadium, New Cairo, Egypt	Seychelles	4–0	5–1	2019 Africa Cup of Nations qualification
5.	16 October 2018	Stade Taïeb Mhiri, Sfax, Tunisia	Nigeria	1–3	2–3	2019 Africa Cup of Nations qualification

== Honours ==
Al Ittihad Tripoli

- Libyan Premier League: 2007, 2008, 2009, 2010, 2021
- Libyan Cup: 2007, 2009, 2018
- Libyan SuperCup: 2007, 2008, 2009, 2010

Al Arabi Kuwait

- Kuwait Crown Cup: 2011–12

Partizan

- Serbian SuperLiga: 2012–13

Riffa SC

- Bahraini Premier League: 2014

Esperance Tunis

- Tunisian Ligue Professionnelle 1: 2016–17

Individual

- Algerian Ligue Professionnelle 1 top scorer: 2015–16 (13 goals)
