= 2015 CECAFA Cup =

CECAFA Senior Challenge Cup

Tournament details
- Host country: Ethiopia
- Dates: 21 November – 5 December
- Teams: 12 (from 2 sub-confederations)
- Venues: 3 (in 3 host cities)

Final positions
- Champions: Uganda (14th title)
- Runners-up: Rwanda
- Third place: Ethiopia
- Fourth place: Sudan

Tournament statistics
- Matches played: 26
- Goals scored: 52 (2 per match)
- Top scorer(s): (Sudan) Athar El Tahir (5 goals)

The 2015 CECAFA Cup is the 38th edition of the annual CECAFA Cup, an international football competition consisting of the national teams of member nations of the Council for East and Central Africa Football Associations (CECAFA). It took place in Ethiopia from 21 November to 5 December 2015.

The tournament was initially scheduled to be hosted in Rwanda. However, in June 2015, it was announced that Ethiopia replaced Rwanda as host due to Rwanda's preparation to host the 2016 African Nations Championship.

== Participants ==
The following teams were confirmed to be participating in the tournament:

National Team	FIFA Ranking (November 2015)
Burundi	107
Djibouti	207
Ethiopia	114
Kenya	125
Malawi	97
Rwanda	96
Somalia	203
South Sudan	134
Sudan	128
Tanzania	135
Uganda	68
Zanzibar	N/A

Notes

- Eritrea national football team refused to participate due to the country's political tensions with hosts Ethiopia.
- A draw containing Zambia was released to the press on 9 November 2015 but appeared to be inaccurate due to Malawi's inclusion.

== Venues ==
Addis Ababa	2015 CECAFA Cup is located in Ethiopia
Yidnekachew Tessema Stadium	2015 CECAFA Cup is located in Ethiopia
Capacity: 35,000	2015 CECAFA Cup is located in Ethiopia
Bahir Dar	2015 CECAFA Cup is located in Ethiopia
Bahir Dar Stadium	2015 CECAFA Cup is located in Ethiopia
Capacity: 60,000	2015 CECAFA Cup is located in Ethiopia
Hawassa	2015 CECAFA Cup is located in Ethiopia
Hawassa International Stadium	2015 CECAFA Cup is located in Ethiopia
Capacity: 60,000	2015 CECAFA Cup is located in Ethiopia

== Match officials ==
Referees

Assistant referees

== Group stage ==
The draw result was announced by CECAFA on 11 November 2015.

If two or more teams were equal on points on completion of the group matches, the following criteria were applied to determine the rankings (in descending order):

1. Number of points obtained in games between the teams involved;
2. Goal difference in games between the teams involved;
3. Goals scored in games between the teams involved;
4. Away goals scored in games between the teams involved;
5. Goal difference in all games;
6. Goals scored in all games;
7. Drawing of lots.

=== Group A ===
Pos	Team	Pld	W	D	L	GF	GA	GD	Pts	Qualification
1	Tanzania (A)	3	2	1	0	7	2	+5	7	Advance to knockout stage
2	Rwanda (A)	3	2	0	1	5	2	+3	6	Advance to knockout stage
3	Ethiopia (H, A)	3	1	1	1	3	2	+1	4	Advance to knockout stage
4	Somalia (E)	3	0	0	3	0	9	−9	0	

Updated to match(es) played on 28 November 2015. Source: Standings table
(A) Advance to a further round; (E) Eliminated; (H) Hosts

21 November 2015
Ethiopia	0–1	Rwanda	Addis Ababa Stadium, Addis Ababa, Ethiopia
22 November 2015
Somalia	0–4	Tanzania	Addis Ababa Stadium, Addis Ababa, Ethiopia
24 November 2015
Rwanda	1–2	Tanzania	Awassa, Ethiopia
25 November 2015
Somalia	0–2	Ethiopia	Awassa, Ethiopia
27 November 2015
Rwanda	3–0	Somalia	Awassa, Ethiopia
28 November 2015
Tanzania	1–1	Ethiopia	Awassa, Ethiopia

=== Group B ===
Pos	Team	Pld	W	D	L	GF	GA	GD	Pts	Qualification
1	Uganda (A)	3	2	0	1	5	2	+3	6	Advance to knockout stage
2	Kenya (A)	3	1	1	1	4	4	0	4	Advance to knockout stage
3	Burundi (E)	3	1	1	1	2	2	0	4	
4	Zanzibar (E)	3	1	0	2	3	6	−3	3	

Updated to match(es) played on 28 November 2015. Source: Standings table
(A) Advance to a further round; (E) Eliminated

21 November 2015
Burundi	1–0	Zanzibar	Addis Ababa Stadium, Addis Ababa, Ethiopia
22 November 2015
Kenya	2–0	Uganda	Addis Ababa Stadium, Addis Ababa, Ethiopia
24 November 2015
Zanzibar	0–4	Uganda	Awassa, Ethiopia
25 November 2015
Kenya	1–1	Burundi	Awassa, Ethiopia
27 November 2015
Zanzibar	3–1	Kenya	Awassa, Ethiopia
28 November 2015
Uganda	1–0	Burundi	Awassa, Ethiopia

=== Group C ===
Pos	Team	Pld	W	D	L	GF	GA	GD	Pts	Qualification
1	South Sudan (A)	3	2	1	0	4	0	+4	7	Advance to knockout stage
2	Malawi (G, A)	3	2	0	1	5	3	+2	6	Advance to knockout stage
3	Sudan (A)	3	1	1	1	5	2	+3	4	Advance to knockout stage
4	Djibouti (E)	3	0	0	3	0	9	−9	0	

Updated to match(es) played on 27 November 2015. Source:
(A) Advance to a further round; (E) Eliminated; (G) Guests

23 November 2015
South Sudan	2–0	Djibouti	Bahir Dar Stadium, Bahir Dar, Ethiopia
Sudan	1–2	Malawi	Bahir Dar Stadium, Bahir Dar, Ethiopia
25 November 2015
Malawi	3–0	Djibouti	Bahir Dar Stadium, Bahir Dar, Ethiopia
South Sudan	0–0	Sudan	Bahir Dar Stadium, Bahir Dar, Ethiopia
27 November 2015
South Sudan	2–0	Malawi	Bahir Dar Stadium, Bahir Dar, Ethiopia
Djibouti	0–4	Sudan	Bahir Dar Stadium, Bahir Dar, Ethiopia

=== Ranking of third-placed teams ===
The two best ranked third-placed teams also advance to the quarter-finals.

Pos	Grp	Team	Pld	W	D	L	GF	GA	GD	Pts	Group stage result
1	C	Sudan	3	1	1	1	5	2	+3	4	Advanced to knockout stage
2	A	Ethiopia	3	1	1	1	3	2	+1	4	Advanced to knockout stage
3	B	Burundi	3	1	1	1	2	2	0	4	

== Knockout stage ==
=== Bracket ===
Quarter-finals
30 November – Addis Ababa
Uganda	2
Malawi	0
30 November – Addis Ababa
Tanzania	1 (3)
Ethiopia (pen.)	1 (4)
1 December – Addis Ababa
Rwanda (pen.)	0 (5)
Kenya	0 (3)
1 December – Addis Ababa
South Sudan	0 (3)
Sudan (pen.)	0 (5)

Semi-finals
3 December – Addis Ababa
Uganda (pen.)	0 (5)
Ethiopia	0 (3)
3 December – Addis Ababa
Rwanda (pen.)	1 (4)
Sudan	1 (2)

Final
5 December – Addis Ababa
Uganda	1
Rwanda	0
Third place
5 December – Addis Ababa
Ethiopia (pen.)	1 (5)
Sudan	1 (4)

=== Quarter-finals ===
Team 1	Score	Team 2
Uganda	2–0	Malawi
Tanzania	1–1 (3–4 p)	Ethiopia
South Sudan	0–0 (3–5 p)	Sudan
Rwanda	0–0 (5–3 p)	Kenya

=== Semi-finals ===
Team 1	Score	Team 2
Uganda	0–0 (5–3 p)	Ethiopia
Rwanda	1–1 (4–2 p)	Sudan

=== Third place match ===
Team 1	Score	Team 2
Ethiopia	1–1 (5–4 p)	Sudan

=== Final ===
Team 1	Score	Team 2
Uganda	1–0	Rwanda

== Goalscorers ==
5 goals

- (Sudan) Athar El Tahir

3 goals

- (Rwanda) Jacques Tuyisenge
- (Tanzania) John Bocco
- (Uganda) Farouk Miya

2 goals

- (Kenya) Jacob Keli
- (Kenya) Michael Olunga
- (Malawi) Chiukepo Msowoya
- (South Sudan) Bruno Martinez
- (Tanzania) Elias Maguli
- (Tanzania) Simon Msuva
- (Uganda) Caesar Okhuti
- (Zanzibar) Suleiman Kassim

1 goal

- (Burundi) Amissi Tambwe
- (Burundi) Didier Kavumbagu
- (Ethiopia) Behailu Girma
- (Ethiopia) Mohammed Nasser
- (Ethiopia) Gatoch Panom
- (Malawi) John Banda
- (Malawi) Gerald Phiri, Jr.
- (Malawi) Dalitso Sayilesi
- (Rwanda) Yussufu Habimana
- (Rwanda) Hegman Ngomirakiza
- (South Sudan) Dominic Abuyo
- (South Sudan) James Moga
- (Sudan) Faris Abdalla
- (Sudan) Walaa Eldin Musa
- (Tanzania) Said Juma
- (Uganda) Frank Kalanda
- (Uganda) Erisa Ssekisambu
- (Zanzibar) Khamis Mcha Khamis

Own goal

- (Tanzania) Salim Mbonde (playing against Ethiopia)
