= 2015 CECAFA Cup group stage =

The 2015 CECAFA Cup Group Stage was the opening round of the CECAFA Cup, a competition played between national teams from the Council for East and Central Africa Football Associations.

The Group Stage took place from November 21-28, 2015, and consisted of twelve teams divided into three groups of four, with each team playing every other in the group in a round–robin format. The best two teams from each group automatically advanced to the quarterfinals, and the two best third-placed teams advanced as well.

The biggest wins of the group stages were all 4–0 wins: Tanzania beat Somalia, Uganda beat Zanzibar, and Sudan beat Djibouti. The only other game that contained four goals was a 3–1 win for Zanzibar over Kenya.

No team won all of its games; Tanzania and South Sudan were the most successful teams as they both earned seven of nine possible points (two wins and a draw).

== Group A ==
Pos	Team	Pld	W	D	L	GF	GA	GD	Pts	Qualification
1	Tanzania (A)	3	2	1	0	7	2	+5	7	Advance to knockout stage
2	Rwanda (A)	3	2	0	1	5	2	+3	6	Advance to knockout stage
3	Ethiopia (H, A)	3	1	1	1	3	2	+1	4	Advance to knockout stage
4	Somalia (E)	3	0	0	3	0	9	−9	0	

Updated to match(es) played on 28 November 2015. Source: Standings table
(A) Advance to a further round; (E) Eliminated; (H) Hosts
21 November 2015
16:00
Match 2

Ethiopia	0–1	Rwanda
	Report	54' Tuyisenge

Addis Ababa Stadium, Addis Ababa
22 November 2015
14:00
Match 3

Somalia	0–4	Tanzania
	Report	11' (pen.), 55' Bocco; 17', 53' Maguli

Addis Ababa Stadium, Addis Ababa
24 November 2015
16:00
Match 8

Rwanda	1–2	Tanzania
Tuyisenge 88'	Report	23' Juma; 78' Msuva

Hawassa International Stadium, Awassa
25 November 2015
16:00
Match 10

Somalia	0–2	Ethiopia
	Report	14' Nasser; 82' Girma

Hawassa International Stadium, Awassa
27 November 2015
14:00
Match 13

Rwanda	3–0	Somalia
Habimana 6'; Tuyisenge 52'; Ngomirakiza 58'	Report

Hawassa International Stadium, Awassa
28 November 2015
16:00
Match 18

Tanzania	1–1	Ethiopia
Msuva 51'	Report	90+2' (o.g.) Mbonde

Hawassa International Stadium, Awassa

== Group B ==
Pos	Team	Pld	W	D	L	GF	GA	GD	Pts	Qualification
1	Uganda (A)	3	2	0	1	5	2	+3	6	Advance to knockout stage
2	Kenya (A)	3	1	1	1	4	4	0	4	Advance to knockout stage
3	Burundi (E)	3	1	1	1	2	2	0	4	
4	Zanzibar (E)	3	1	0	2	3	6	−3	3	

Updated to match(es) played on 28 November 2015. Source: Standings table
(A) Advance to a further round; (E) Eliminated
21 November 2015
14:00
Match 1

Burundi	1–0	Zanzibar
Kavumbagu 39'	Report

Addis Ababa Stadium, Addis Ababa
22 November 2015
16:00
Match 4

Kenya	2–0	Uganda
Keli 29'; Olunga 48'	Report

Addis Ababa Stadium, Addis Ababa
24 November 2015
14:00
Match 7

Zanzibar	0–4	Uganda
	Report	10', 17' (pen.) Miya; 48' Ssekisambu; 79' Okhuti

Hawassa International Stadium, Awassa
25 November 2015
14:00
Match 9

Kenya	1–1	Burundi
Olunga 41'	Report	11' Tambwe

Hawassa International Stadium, Awassa
27 November 2015
16:00
Match 14

Zanzibar	3–1	Kenya
Kassim 45+1', 74'; Khamis 57'	Report	90+2' Keli

Hawassa International Stadium, Awassa
28 November 2015
14:00
Match 17

Uganda	1–0	Burundi
Kalanda 67'	Report

Hawassa International Stadium, Awassa

== Group C ==
Pos	Team	Pld	W	D	L	GF	GA	GD	Pts	Qualification
1	South Sudan (A)	3	2	1	0	4	0	+4	7	Advance to knockout stage
2	Malawi (G, A)	3	2	0	1	5	3	+2	6	Advance to knockout stage
3	Sudan (A)	3	1	1	1	5	2	+3	4	Advance to knockout stage
4	Djibouti (E)	3	0	0	3	0	9	−9	0	

Updated to match(es) played on 27 November 2015. Source:
(A) Advance to a further round; (E) Eliminated; (G) Guests
23 November 2015
14:00
Match 5

South Sudan	2–0	Djibouti
Bruno 28'; Pretino 72'	Report

Bahir Dar Stadium, Bahir Dar
23 November 2015
16:00
Match 6

Sudan	1–2	Malawi
A. El Tahir 16'	Report	13' Sayilesi; 29' Msowoya

Bahir Dar Stadium, Bahir Dar
25 November 2015
18:00
Match 11

Malawi	3–0	Djibouti
Phiri 38' (pen.); Banda 40'; Msowoya 76'	Report

Bahir Dar Stadium, Bahir Dar
25 November 2015
20:00
Match 12

South Sudan	0–0	Sudan
	Report

Bahir Dar Stadium, Bahir Dar
27 November 2015
18:00
Match 15

South Sudan	2–0	Malawi
Moga 8'; Bruno 90+2'	Report

Bahir Dar Stadium, Bahir Dar
27 November 2015
20:00
Match 16

Djibouti	0–4	Sudan
	Report	16', 68', 81' A. El Tahir; 25' Faris Abdalla

Bahir Dar Stadium, Bahir Dar
