= 2015 CECAFA Cup knockout stage =

The 2015 CECAFA Cup Knockout Stage was the second stage of the 2015 CECAFA Cup, an African international football competition. This stage took place between November 30 to December 5, 2015 in Addis Ababa, Ethiopia. Eight teams advanced from the Group Stage.

== Bracket ==
Quarter-finals
30 November – Addis Ababa
Uganda	2
Malawi	0
30 November – Addis Ababa
Tanzania	1 (3)
Ethiopia (pen.)	1 (4)
1 December – Addis Ababa
Rwanda (pen.)	0 (5)
Kenya	0 (3)
1 December – Addis Ababa
South Sudan	0 (3)
Sudan (pen.)	0 (5)

Semi-finals
3 December – Addis Ababa
Uganda (pen.)	0 (5)
Ethiopia	0 (3)
3 December – Addis Ababa
Rwanda (pen.)	1 (4)
Sudan	1 (2)

Final
5 December – Addis Ababa
Uganda	1
Rwanda	0
Third place
5 December – Addis Ababa
Ethiopia (pen.)	1 (5)
Sudan	1 (4)

== Results ==
=== Quarter-finals ===
30 November 2015
Match 19

Uganda	2–0	Malawi
Miya 5'; Okhuti 48'

Addis Ababa
30 November 2015
Match 20

Tanzania	1–1	Ethiopia
Bocco 25'	Report	Panom 57' (pen.)
Penalties
	4–3

Addis Ababa
1 December 2015
Match 21

South Sudan	0–0	Sudan
	Report
Penalties
	3–5

Addis Ababa
1 December 2015
Match 22

Rwanda	0–0	Kenya
	Report
Penalties
	5–3

Addis Ababa

=== Semi-finals ===
3 December 2015
Match 23

Uganda	0–0	Ethiopia
	Report
Penalties
	5–3

Addis Ababa
3 December 2015
Match 24

Rwanda	1–1	Sudan
Mugiraneza 110'	Report	Athar El Tahir 97'
Penalties
	4–2

Addis Ababa

=== Third-place playoff ===
5 December 2015
Match 25

Ethiopia	1–1	Sudan
Mamo 57'	Report	Yagoub 82'
Penalties
	5–4

Addis Ababa

=== Final ===
5 December 2015
Match 26

Uganda	1–0	Rwanda
Okhuti 15'	Report

Addis Ababa
