= Hawassa Industrial Park =

Eco-industrial park in Hawassa, Sidama Region, Ethiopia

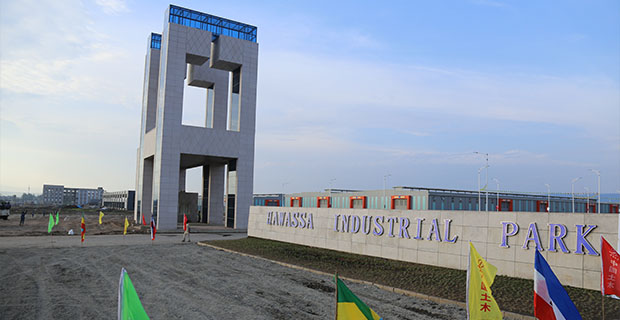
- Hawassa Industrial Park in 2017

- Location within Ethiopia Location within Horn of Africa Location within Africa
- Location: Hawassa, Sidama Region, Ethiopia
- Coordinates: 7.066947°N 38.492878°E
- Opening date: 13 July 2016
- Developer: Ethiopian government
- Construction cost: +300 million dollars
- Manager: Eshetu Shanko
- Owner: Fitsum Ketema (CEO)
- No. of workers: 35,000 workers
- Size: 150 ha (370 acres)

The Hawassa Industrial Park (HIP) is an eco-industrial park located in Hawassa, Sidama Region, Ethiopia. Established on 13 July 2016, the park is a government-supported project focusing on the manufacturing of garments, apparel, and textiles. The initial development of the industrial park encompasses 130 hectares of land, with potential expansion up to 400 hectares. Hawassa Industrial Park faced significant challenges in 2022, including factory closures and job losses, following the United States government's decision to remove Ethiopia from the African Growth and Opportunity Act's duty-free access to US markets. However, in the three months between October 2022 and January 2023, the park generated 32 million USD in revenue, indicating a potential revival of the sector.

== Overview ==
The Hawassa Industrial Park, inaugurated on 13 July 2016, is a government-funded project in Ethiopia, specializing in the textile and garment industry. During the opening ceremony, Prime Minister Hailemariam Desalegn described the industrial park as an important step towards Ethiopia's goal of becoming a leading manufacturing hub in Africa. The eco-industrial park had attracted 22 firms as of 2020.

The first phase of the Hawassa Industrial Park covers approximately 130 hectares of land, with the potential to expand up to 400 hectares. The park features a zero liquid discharge (ZLD) facility, which minimizes environmental impact by treating and recycling wastewater. This enables companies to meet stringent environmental standards required by international markets, allowing them to focus on exports. The park consists of 37 sheds (22 sheds of 11,000 m2, 12 sheds of 5,500 m2, and three specialized sheds). The first phase has the capacity to create employment for approximately 20,000 people, with the potential to accommodate up to 60,000 people when fully completed, according to the Ethiopian Investment Commission.

In the 2017-2018 fiscal year the Hawassa Industrial Park generated 20 million dollars. In comparison the Bole Lemi Industrial Park in Addis Ababa generated 32 million dollars in exports and the Eastern Industrial Park recorded 14 million dollars. As of March 2019, Hawassa had created the largest number of jobs of Ethiopian Industrial Parks, with up to 24,000 people employed. The industrial park aimed to identify, select, grade, and train approximately 30,000 employees within the next two years.

== Impact of the Tigray War ==
In 2022, the Hawassa Industrial Park faced significant challenges due to factory closures and job losses, which resulted from the United States government's decision to remove Ethiopia from the African Growth and Opportunity Act's duty-free access to US markets. The termination of preferential trade benefits was due to "gross violations of internationally recognized human rights by the government of Ethiopia and other parties" in the war in the northern part of the country. At its peak, the Hawassa Industrial Park employed over 35,000 workers. However, the closures led to massive job losses, with some companies retrenching thousands of workers.

Despite these challenges, the Ethiopian Industrial Parks Development Corporation (IPDC) reported that the Hawassa Industrial Park generated 32 million USD in revenue between October 2022 and January 2023, indicating a potential revival of the sector. According to the IPDC, the demand for new investors in industrial parks increased following the Pretoria peace agreement.
