= Hegman Ngomirakiza =

Rwandan footballer

Personal information
- Full name: Hegman Ngomirakiza
- Date of birth: 25 March 1992 (age 34)
- Place of birth: Kalemie, DR Congo
- Height: 1.85 m (6 ft 1 in)
- Position: Midfielder

Team information
- Current team: APR
- Number: 77

Senior career*
Years	Team	Apps	(Gls)
2007–2015	APR	145	(97)

International career^{‡}
2007–2016	Rwanda	9	(3)
- * Club domestic league appearances and goals as of 08:59, 9 February 2016 (UTC) ‡ National team caps and goals as of 08:59, 9 February 2016 (UTC)

Hegman Ngomirakiza (born 25 March 1992) is a Rwandan international footballer who plays for APR.

== International career ==
=== International goals ===
Scores and results list Rwanda's goal tally first.

No	Date	Venue	Opponent	Score	Result	Competition
1.	13 December 2007	National Stadium, Dar es Salaam, Tanzania	Djibouti	7–0	9–0	2007 CECAFA Cup
2.	27 November 2015	Awassa Kenema Stadium, Awasa, Ethiopia	Somalia	3–0	3–0	2015 CECAFA Cup
3.	24 January 2016	Amahoro Stadium, Kigali, Rwanda	Rwanda	1–3	1–4	2016 African Nations Championship

== Honours ==
APR

Winner

- Rwanda National Football League (5): 2009–10, 2010–11, 2011–12, 2013–14, 2014–15
