= Farouk Miya =

Ugandan footballer (born 1997)

Personal information
- Date of birth: 26 November 1997 (age 28)
- Place of birth: Bulo, Uganda
- Height: 1.77 m (5 ft 10 in)
- Position: Attacking midfielder

Team information
- Current team: Vipers

Senior career*
Years	Team	Apps	(Gls)
2013–2016	Vipers	49	(20)
2016–2018	Standard Liège	3	(1)
2017	→ Mouscron (loan)	1	(0)
2018	→ Səbail (loan)	13	(2)
2018–2019	Gorica	33	(6)
2019–2021	Konyaspor	41	(8)
2022	Lviv	0	(0)
2022–2024	Çaykur Rizespor	20	(4)
2025–2026	Ilioupoli	14	(4)
2026–	Vipers	0	(0)

International career^{‡}
2015	Uganda U23	6	(3)
2014–2023	Uganda	79	(23)
- * Club domestic league appearances and goals as of 19:28, 22 July 2026 (UTC) ‡ National team caps and goals as of 20:00, 7 September 2023 (UTC)

Farouk Miya (born 26 November 1997) is a Ugandan professional footballer who plays as an attacking midfielder for Uganda Premier League club Vipers and Uganda national team.

== Club career ==
In January 2016, it was announced that Miya would be joining Belgian top flight club, Standard Liège in what was reported to be an initial loan deal taking him from Ugandan club Vipers. Standard Liège acquired his services for a fee of 400,000 US$.

On 31 January 2017, Miya was loaned to Royal Excel Mouscron until the end of the season.

In February 2018, Miya was loaned to Səbail FK, returning at the end of the 2017–18 season.

On 20 August 2019, Miya signed a three-year contract with Süper Lig side Konyaspor. He made his debut five days later against Galatasaray at Türk Telekom Stadium.

He joined TFF First League club Çaykur Rizespor on a two-year contract in July 2022.

Miya rejoined Uganda Premier League club Vipers in July 2026 for the 2026–27 season after two weeks of training with the club.

== International career ==
Miya made his debut for the Uganda national team on 11 July 2014 against Seychelles.

== Career statistics ==
=== International ===
As of matches played on 7 September 2023

Appearances and goals by national team and year
National team	Year	Apps	Goals
Uganda	2014	9	2
Uganda	2015	16	10
Uganda	2016	13	3
Uganda	2017	13	2
Uganda	2018	6	4
Uganda	2019	9	1
Uganda	2020	2	0
Uganda	2021	2	0
Uganda	2022	4	1
Uganda	2023	5	0
Total		79	23

Scores and results list Uganda's goal tally first, score column indicates score after each Miya goal. This list includes non official goals.

List of international goals scored by Farouk Miya
No.	Date	Venue	Opponent	Score	Result	Competition
1	11 July 2014	Lugogo Stadium, Kampala, Uganda	Seychelles	1–0	1–0	Friendly
2	9 November 2014	Mandela National Stadium, Kampala, Uganda	Ethiopia	3–0	3–0	Friendly
3	25 March 2015	Godswill Akpabio International Stadium, Uyo, Nigeria	Nigeria	1–0	1–0	Friendly
4	20 June 2015	Amaan Stadium, Zanzibar City, Tanzania	Tanzania	3–0	3–0	2016 African Nations Championship qualification
5	17 October 2015	Nakivubo Stadium, Kampala, Uganda	Sudan	2–0	2–0	2016 African Nations Championship qualification
6	25 October 2015	Khartoum Stadium, Khartoum, Sudan	Sudan	2–0	2–0	2016 African Nations Championship qualification
7	12 November 2015	Stade de Kégué, Lomé, Togo	Togo	1–0	1–0	2018 FIFA World Cup qualification
8	15 November 2015	Mandela National Stadium, Kampala, Uganda	Togo	2–0	3–0	2018 FIFA World Cup qualification
9	15 November 2015	Mandela National Stadium, Kampala, Uganda	Togo	3–0	3–0	2018 FIFA World Cup qualification
10	24 November 2015	Awassa Kenema Stadium, Awassa, Ethiopia	Zanzibar	1–0	4–0	2015 CECAFA Cup
11	24 November 2015	Awassa Kenema Stadium, Awassa, Ethiopia	Zanzibar	2–0	4–0	2015 CECAFA Cup
12	30 November 2015	Addis Ababa Stadium, Addis Ababa, Ethiopia	Malawi	1–0	2–0	2015 CECAFA Cup
13	19 January 2016	Umuganda Stadium, Gisenyi, Rwanda	Mali	2–1	2–2	2016 African Nations Championship
14	4 September 2016	Mandela National Stadium, Kampala, Uganda	Comoros	1–0	1–0	2017 Africa Cup of Nations qualification
15	12 November 2016	Mandela National Stadium, Kampala, Uganda	Congo	1–0	1–0	2018 FIFA World Cup qualification
16	8 January 2017	Armed Forces Stadium, Abu Dhabi, United Arab Emirates	Slovakia	2–0	3–1	Friendly
17	25 January 2017	Stade d'Oyem, Oyem, Gabon	Mali	1–0	1–1	2017 Africa Cup of Nations
18	2 June 2018	Stade Général Seyni Kountché, Niamey, Niger	Niger	1–2	1–2	Friendly
19	13 October 2018	Mandela National Stadium, Kampala, Uganda	Lesotho	2–0	3–0	2019 Africa Cup of Nations qualification
20	16 October 2018	Setsoto Stadium, Awassa, Lesotho	Lesotho	1–0	2–0	2019 Africa Cup of Nations qualification
21	16 October 2018	Setsoto Stadium, Awassa, Lesotho	Lesotho	2–0	2–0	2019 Africa Cup of Nations qualification
22	15 June 2019	Zayed Sports City Stadium, Abu Dhabi, United Arab Emirates	Ivory Coast	1–0	1–0	Friendly
23	29 March 2022	Markaziy Stadium, Namangan, Uzbekistan	Uzbekistan	1–2	2–4	2022 Nowruz Cup

== Honours ==
Standard Liège

- Belgian Cup: 2015–16
