= Jacques Tuyisenge =

Rwandan footballer (born 1991)

Personal information
- Full name: Jacques Tuyisenge
- Date of birth: 22 September 1991 (age 35)
- Place of birth: Gisenyi, Rwanda
- Height: 1.80 m (5 ft 11 in)
- Position: Forward

Senior career*
Years	Team	Apps	(Gls)
2009–2011	Kiyovu Sports		
2011–2015	Police	33	(13)
2016–2019	Gor Mahia		(50)
2019–2020	Petro de Luanda		
2020–	APR		

International career^{‡}
2011–	Rwanda	52	(15)
- * Club domestic league appearances and goals as of 18 August 2019 ‡ National team caps and goals as of 30 March 2021

Jacques Tuyisenge (born 22 September 1991) is a Rwandan professional footballer who plays as a forward for APR F.C. and captains the Rwanda national team.

== Club career ==
=== Police ===
Tuyisenge joined local club Police at the age of 16. He was a regular starter and in his first season at the club he scored 11 goals.

=== Gor Mahia ===
Tuyisenge joined Kenyan Premier League club Gor Mahia on a $4,000 deal from Police in Rwanda. He scored his first goal in the 21st minute against Tusker from an overhead kick.

=== Petro de Luanda ===
In August 2019, Tuyisenge signed with Petro de Luanda in the Angolan league, the Girabola.

== International career ==
On 4 June 2016, Tuyisenge scored two goals in a 3–2 home defeat against Mozambique.

=== International goals ===
As of match played 10 September 2019. Rwanda score listed first, score column indicates score after each Tuyisenge goal.

International goals by date, venue, cap, opponent, score, result and competition
No.	Date	Venue	Cap	Opponent	Score	Result	Competition
1	12 December 2014	Stade Régional Nyamirambo, Kigali, Rwanda	12	Gabon	1–0	1–0	Friendly
2	28 August 2015	Amahoro Stadium, Kigali, Rwanda	16	Ethiopia	2–1	3–1	Friendly
3	17 November 2015	Stade Régional Nyamirambo, Kigali, Rwanda	20	Libya	1–1	1–3	2018 FIFA World Cup qualification
4	21 November 2015	Addis Ababa Stadium, Addis Ababa, Ethiopia	21	Ethiopia	1–0	1–0	2015 CECAFA Cup
5	24 November 2015	Awassa Kenema Stadium, Awasa, Ethiopia	22	Tanzania	1–2	1–2	2015 CECAFA Cup
6	27 November 2015	Awassa Kenema Stadium, Awasa, Ethiopia	23	Somalia	2–0	3–0	2015 CECAFA Cup
7	10 January 2016	Umuganda Stadium, Gisenyi, Rwanda	28	DR Congo	1–0	1–0	Friendly
8	4 June 2016	Amahoro Stadium, Kigali, Rwanda	33	Mozambique	1–1	2–3	2017 Africa Cup of Nations qualification
9	4 June 2016	Amahoro Stadium, Kigali, Rwanda	33	Mozambique	2–2	2–3	2017 Africa Cup of Nations qualification
10	16 October 2018	Stade Régional Nyamirambo, Kigali, Rwanda	37	Guinea	1–1	1–1	2019 Africa Cup of Nations qualification
11	18 November 2018	Stade Huye, Butare, Rwanda	38	Central African Republic	1–0	2–2	2019 Africa Cup of Nations qualification
12	18 November 2018	Stade Huye, Butare, Rwanda	38	Central African Republic	2–1	2–2	2019 Africa Cup of Nations qualification
13	10 September 2019	Stade Régional Nyamirambo, Kigali, Rwanda	41	Seychelles	3–0	7–0	2022 FIFA World Cup qualification
14	10 September 2019	Stade Régional Nyamirambo, Kigali, Rwanda	41	Seychelles	4–0	7–0	2022 FIFA World Cup qualification
