= John Banda =

Malawian footballer (born 1993)

Personal information
- Date of birth: 20 August 1983 (age 43)
- Place of birth: Nkhata Bay, Malawi
- Height: 1.60 m (5 ft 3 in)
- Position: Midfielder

Team information
- Current team: UD Songo
- Number: 10

Senior career*
Years	Team	Apps	(Gls)
2011–2015	Blue Eagles		
2016–2018	Ferroviário de Nampula		
2019–	UD Songo		

International career^{‡}
2011–	Malawi	86	(7)
- * Club domestic league appearances and goals ‡ National team caps and goals as of 08:54, 21 November 2023 (UTC)

John Banda (born 20 August 1993) is a Malawian footballer who plays for Moçambola club UD Songo as a midfielder and Malawi national team.

He played for Malawi at the 2021 Africa Cup of Nations.

== International career ==
=== International goals ===
Scores and results list Malawi's goal tally first.

No	Date	Venue	Opponent	Score	Result	Competition
1	9 June 2012	Kamuzu Stadium, Blantyre, Malawi	Nigeria	1–1	1–1	2014 FIFA World Cup qualification
2	16 June 2012	Kamuzu Stadium, Blantyre, Malawi	Chad	1–0	2–0	2013 Africa Cup of Nations qualification
3	2 August 2014	Kamuzu Stadium, Blantyre, Malawi	Benin	1–0	1–0 (4–3 p)	2015 Africa Cup of Nations qualification
4	8 June 2015	Borg El Arab Stadium, Alexandria, Egypt	Egypt	1–2	1–2	Friendly
5	13 June 2015	Kamuzu Stadium, Blantyre, Malawi	Zimbabwe	1–1	1–2	2017 Africa Cup of Nations qualification
6	11 October 2015	Kamuzu Stadium, Blantyre, Malawi	Tanzania	1–0	1–0	2018 FIFA World Cup qualification
7	25 November 2015	Bahir Dar Stadium, Bahir Dar, Ethiopia	Djibouti	2–0	3–0	2015 CECAFA Cup
