= Gatoch Panom =

Ethiopian footballer (born 1994)

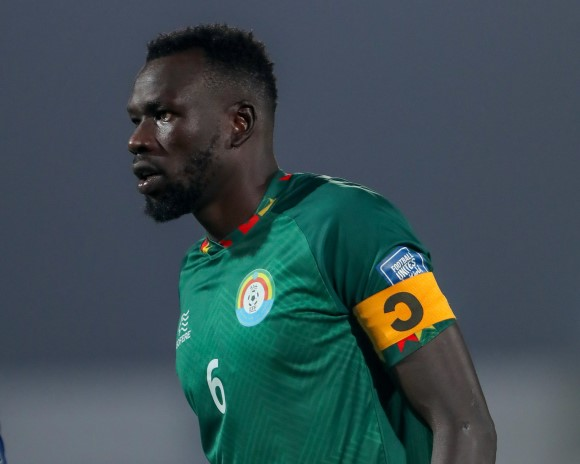

Personal information
- Full name: Gatoch Panom Yiech
- Date of birth: 30 November 1994 (age 31)
- Place of birth: Gambela, Ethiopia
- Height: 1.90 m (6 ft 3 in)
- Position: Defensive midfielder

Team information
- Current team: Al-Arabi
- Number: 21

Senior career*
Years	Team	Apps	(Gls)
2012–2017	Ethiopian Coffee		
2017	Anzhi Makhachkala	0	(0)
2018	Mekelle City	14	(2)
2018–2019	El Gouna	31	(1)
2019–2020	Haras El Hodoud	2	(0)
2020	Al-Anwar		
2021	Wolaitta Dicha	9	(1)
2021–2023	Saint George	50	(3)
2023–2025	Fasil Kenema	16	(1)
2025	Newroz	24	(4)
2025–2026	Al-Najaf	7	(1)
2026–	Al-Arabi	7	(2)

International career^{‡}
2012–	Ethiopia	70	(8)
- * Club domestic league appearances and goals as of 20:00, 15 February 2025 (UTC) ‡ National team caps and goals as of 15:36, 15 October 2024 (UTC)

Gatoch Panom Yiech (Amharic: ጋቶች ፓኖም; born 30 November 1994) is an Ethiopian professional footballer who plays as a defensive midfielder for the Saudi First Division League club Al-Arabi and captains the Ethiopia national team.

== Club career ==
=== Ethiopian Coffee ===
The Addis Ababa-based club Ethiopian Coffee was Panom's first professional club when he made his debut for them in 2012. After making many appearances and becoming a regular starter, his form with the club earned him his first call up to the Ethiopia national team in 2014. In June 2017, Panom become the first Ethiopian player to complete a transfer directly from an Ethiopian club to a Russian club when he made his move to FC Anzhi Makhachkala.

=== Anzhi Makhachkala ===
On 21 June 2017, Panom signed a three-year contract with the Russian club FC Anzhi Makhachkala. Anzhi registered him with the league as a Chad citizen.

Panom made his debut for the main squad of Anzhi Makhachkala on 20 September 2017 in a Russian Cup game against FC Luch-Energiya Vladivostok. On 14 December 2017, Panom's Anzhi contract was dissolved by mutual consent.

=== Mekelle City ===
On 22 February 2018, Panom signed with Ethiopian Premier League debutantes Mekelle City FC on a contract that would keep him at the club until the end of the season. Due to a lingering muscle injury Panom had to sit out the first few games with the club until making his debut on 11 April 2018 against Jimma Aba Jifar.

=== El Gouna ===
In July 2018, El Gouna announced the signing of Panom.

=== Al-Anwar ===
In January 2020, Al-Anwar announced the signing of Panom.

=== Wolaitta Dicha ===
On 9 February 2021, Panom returned to Ethiopia and signed for Wolaitta Dicha.

=== Newroz ===
On 11 January 2025, Newroz confirmed the signing of Panom.

=== Al-Arabi ===
On 2 February 2026, joined Al-Arabi.

== International career ==
In January 2014, coach Sewnet Bishaw, invited him to be a part of the Ethiopia squad for the 2014 African Nations Championship. The team was eliminated in the group stages after losing to Congo, Libya and Ghana.

== Career statistics ==
=== Club ===
As of match played 20 September 2017

Appearances and goals by club, season and competition
Club	Season	League			National Cup		Continental		Other		Total	
Club	Season	Division	Apps	Goals	Apps	Goals	Apps	Goals	Apps	Goals	Apps	Goals
Anzhi Makhachkala	2017–18	Russian Premier League	0	0	1	0	–		–		1	0
Mekelle City	2017–18	Ethiopian Premier League	14	2			–					
El Gouna	2018–19	Egyptian Premier League	2				–					
Career total			16	2	1	0	-	-	-	-	17	0

=== International ===
As of match played 25 February 2023

Appearances and goals by national team and year
National team	Year	Apps	Goals
Ethiopia	2012	4	0
Ethiopia	2013	0	0
Ethiopia	2014	0	0
Ethiopia	2015	18	6
Ethiopia	2016	6	1
Ethiopia	2017	1	0
Ethiopia	2018	4	0
Ethiopia	2019	3	0
Ethiopia	2021	3	0
Ethiopia	2022	7	0
Ethiopia	2023	3	1
Total		45	8

Scores and results list Ethiopia's goal tally first, score column indicates score after each Panom goal.

List of international goals scored by Gatoch Panom
No.	Date	Venue	Opponent	Score	Result	Competition
1	14 June 2015	Bahir Dar Stadium, Bahir Dar, Ethiopia	Lesotho	1–1	2–1	2017 Africa Cup of Nations qualification
2	21 June 2015	Bahir Dar Stadium, Bahir Dar, Ethiopia	Kenya	2–0	2–0	2016 African Nations Championship qualification
3	11 October 2015	Addis Ababa Stadium, Addis Ababa, Ethiopia	São Tomé and Príncipe	2–0	3–0	2018 FIFA World Cup qualification
4	25 October 2015	Addis Ababa Stadium, Addis Ababa, Ethiopia	Burundi	2–0	3–0	2016 African Nations Championship qualification
5	25 October 2015	Addis Ababa Stadium, Addis Ababa, Ethiopia	Burundi	3–0	3–0	2016 African Nations Championship qualification
6	30 November 2015	Addis Ababa Stadium, Addis Ababa, Ethiopia	Tanzania	1–1 (4–3 p)	1–1	2015 CECAFA Cup
7	9 January 2016	Addis Ababa Stadium, Addis Ababa, Ethiopia	Niger	1–1	1–1	Friendly
8	21 January 2023	19 May 1956 Stadium, Annaba, Algeria	Libya	1–0	1–3	2022 African Nations Championship
