= Africa Beza College =

Private university college in Ethiopia

Africa Beza University College
- Type: Private
- Established: 2005
- Location: Nekemte, Shashemene, Addis Ababa, Awassa, Ethiopia; 7.047875°N 38.477917°E
- Campus: Urban
- Nickname: ABUC
- Website: University website

Africa Beza University College (ABUC) is a private university college in Ethiopia, founded on November 20, 2005, in Awassa, the Southern Nations, Nationalities, and Peoples Region state capital. It initially had an enrollment of 450 students. Shortly thereafter, ABUC expanded to Shashemene and also opened Addis Ababa and Nekemte branches in October 1999 and January 2000, respectively.
