= Ediofe Hills FC =

Association football club in Uganda

Ediofe Hills FC is a Ugandan football club in Arua, Uganda. It is one of the many clubs that play in different leagues of Uganda. Currently it competes in lower divisions. They played a single season in the top level of Ugandan professional football, the Ugandan Super League, in 2007–08.

== Club history and performance ==
- Location: The club is based in Arua, Uganda, and played their home games at the Dorcus Inzikuru Stadium.
- League Participation: Ediofe Hills FC achieved promotion to the national Super League as the northern Uganda representative after winning the regional mini-league in 2007. They played one season at the top tier (2007–08) and are currently in the lower divisions of Ugandan football.
- Past Wins:
  - West Nile Football Cup: The team has previously won the West Nile Football Cup.
  - Northern Uganda Football Mini Super League: They won this tournament to gain promotion to the national super league.
- Notable Players: During their time in the top league, a notable player was striker Caesar Okhuti, who was called up to the national team (the Cranes) for international duty.

== See also ==
- Maroons FC
- Masaka Local Council FC
- Mbale Heroes FC
- Mbarara City FC
- Mbarara United FC
- MYDA FC
