= Walaa Eldin Yaqoub =

Sudanese footballer (born 2000)

Walaaeldin Musa
Personal information
- Full name: Walaaeldin Musa Yagoub Muhamed
- Date of birth: 1 January 2000 (age 26)
- Position: Forward

Team information
- Current team: Al-Hilal SC (Al-Managel)
- Number: 9

Senior career*
Years	Team	Apps	(Gls)
2011-2012	Al-Hilal SC (Senar)		
2013	Al-Rabita SC (Senar)		
2014-2015	Al-Ahli SC (Wad Madani)		
2016–2019	Al-Hilal (Omdurman)		
2019–2020	Hay Al-Wadi SC (Nyala)		
2020–2023	Al-Ahly (Shendi)		
2023-2025	Hay Al-Arab SC		
2024	Al-Wefaq SC (Ajdabiya) (loan)		
2025-	Al-Hilal SC (Al-Managel)		

International career^{‡}
2016–2017	Sudan U20	7	(6)
2015–	Sudan U23	5	(2)
2015–	Sudan	10	(3)
Medal record
Men's football
Representing Sudan
African Nations Championship
Third place	2018 Morocco
- * Club domestic league appearances and goals as of 11:44, 26 January 2025 (UTC) ‡ National team caps and goals as of 6:04, 28 April 2024 (UTC)

Walaaeldin Musa Yagoub Muhamed (Arabic: ولاء الدين موسى يعقوب; born 1 January 2000) is a Sudanese footballer who currently plays as a forward for Hay Al-Arab SC.

== International career ==
Yaqoub scored against Mauritania on 17 January 2018, just over two years after scoring his first for his nation against Ethiopia in the 2015 CECAFA Cup.

== Career statistics ==
=== Club ===
As of 20 May 2018.

Club	Season	League			Cup		Continental		Other		Total	
Club	Season	Division	Apps	Goals	Apps	Goals	Apps	Goals	Apps	Goals	Apps	Goals
Al-Hilal	2017	Sudan Premier League	?	2	?	?	1 (Note: Appearances in the CAF Champions League)	0	?	?	1	2
Al-Hilal	2018	Sudan Premier League	?	2	?	?	2	0	?	?	2	2
Al-Hilal	2018–19	Sudan Premier League	?	?	?	?	4	0	?	?	4	0
Al-Hilal	2019–20	Sudan Premier League	?	?	?	?	1	0	?	?	1	0
Career total			?	4	?	?	8	0	?	?	8	4

=== International ===
As of match played 2 January 2019.

National team	Year	Apps	Goals
Sudan	2015	3	1
Sudan	2018	6	2
Sudan	2022	1	0
Total		10	3

=== International goals ===
Scores and results list Sudan's goal tally first.

No	Date	Venue	Opponent	Score	Result	Competition
1.	5 December 2015	Addis Ababa Stadium, Addis Ababa, Ethiopia	Ethiopia	1–1	1–1	2015 CECAFA Cup
2.	17 January 2018	Stade Mohammed V, Casablanca, Morocco	Mauritania	1–0	1–0	2018 African Nations Championship
3.	3 February 2018	Marrakesh Stadium, Marrakesh, Morocco	Libya	1–0	1–1	2018 African Nations Championship

== Honours ==
Sudan

- African Nations Championship: 3rd place, 2018
