= Ather El Tahir =

Sudanese footballer

Personal information
- Full name: Ather El Tahir Babikir Mohamed
- Date of birth: 24 October 1996 (age 30)
- Place of birth: Khartoum, Sudan
- Height: 1.72 m (5 ft 8 in)
- Position: Right-back

Senior career*
Years	Team	Apps	(Gls)
2014–2020	Al-Hilal Omdurman		(14)
2020–2022	Smouha	25	(2)
2022–2024	Al-Hilal Omdurman		
2024–2025	Al-Madina	7	(0)

International career^{‡}
2015–2023	Sudan	47	(8)
Medal record
Men's football
Representing Sudan
African Nations Championship
Third place	2018 Morocco
- * Club domestic league appearances and goals as of 1 September 2024 ‡ National team caps and goals as of 9 January 2022

Ather El Tahir Babikir Mohamed (Arabic: اطهر الطاهر; born 24 October 1996) is a Sudanese professional footballer who plays as a right-back. He has played for the Sudan national team.

== Career statistics ==
=== International ===
As of match played 23 March 2023

Appearances and goals by national team and year
National team	Year	Apps	Goals
Sudan	2015	8	5
Sudan	2016	5	0
Sudan	2017	3	1
Sudan	2018	4	0
Sudan	2019	7	0
Sudan	2020	6	1
Sudan	2021	7	1
Sudan	2023	2	0
Total		46	8

Scores and results list Sudan's goal tally first, score column indicates score after each El Tahir goal.

List of international goals scored by Ather El Tahir
No.	Date	Venue	Opponent	Score	Result	Competition	Ref.
1	23 November 2015	Bahir Dar Stadium, Bahir Dar, Ethiopia	Malawi	1–1	1–2	2015 CECAFA Cup	
2	27 November 2015	Bahir Dar Stadium, Bahir Dar, Ethiopia	Djibouti	1–0	4–0	2015 CECAFA Cup	
3	27 November 2015	Bahir Dar Stadium, Bahir Dar, Ethiopia	Djibouti	3–0	4–0	2015 CECAFA Cup	
4	27 November 2015	Bahir Dar Stadium, Bahir Dar, Ethiopia	Djibouti	4–0	4–0	2015 CECAFA Cup	
5	3 December 2015	Addis Ababa Stadium, Addis Ababa, Ethiopia	Rwanda	1–0	1–1	2015 CECAFA Cup	
6	9 June 2017	Al-Ubayyid Stadium, El-Obeid, Sudan	Madagascar	1–2	1–3	2019 Africa Cup of Nations qualification	
7	6 November 2020	Addis Ababa Stadium, Addis Ababa, Ethiopia	Ethiopia	1–2	2–2	Friendly	
8	11 June 2021	Al-Hilal Stadium, Omdurman, Sudan	Zambia	2–0	3–2	Friendly	

== Honours ==
Sudan

- African Nations Championship: 3rd place, 2018
