= Erisa Ssekisambu =

Ugandan footballer (born 1995)

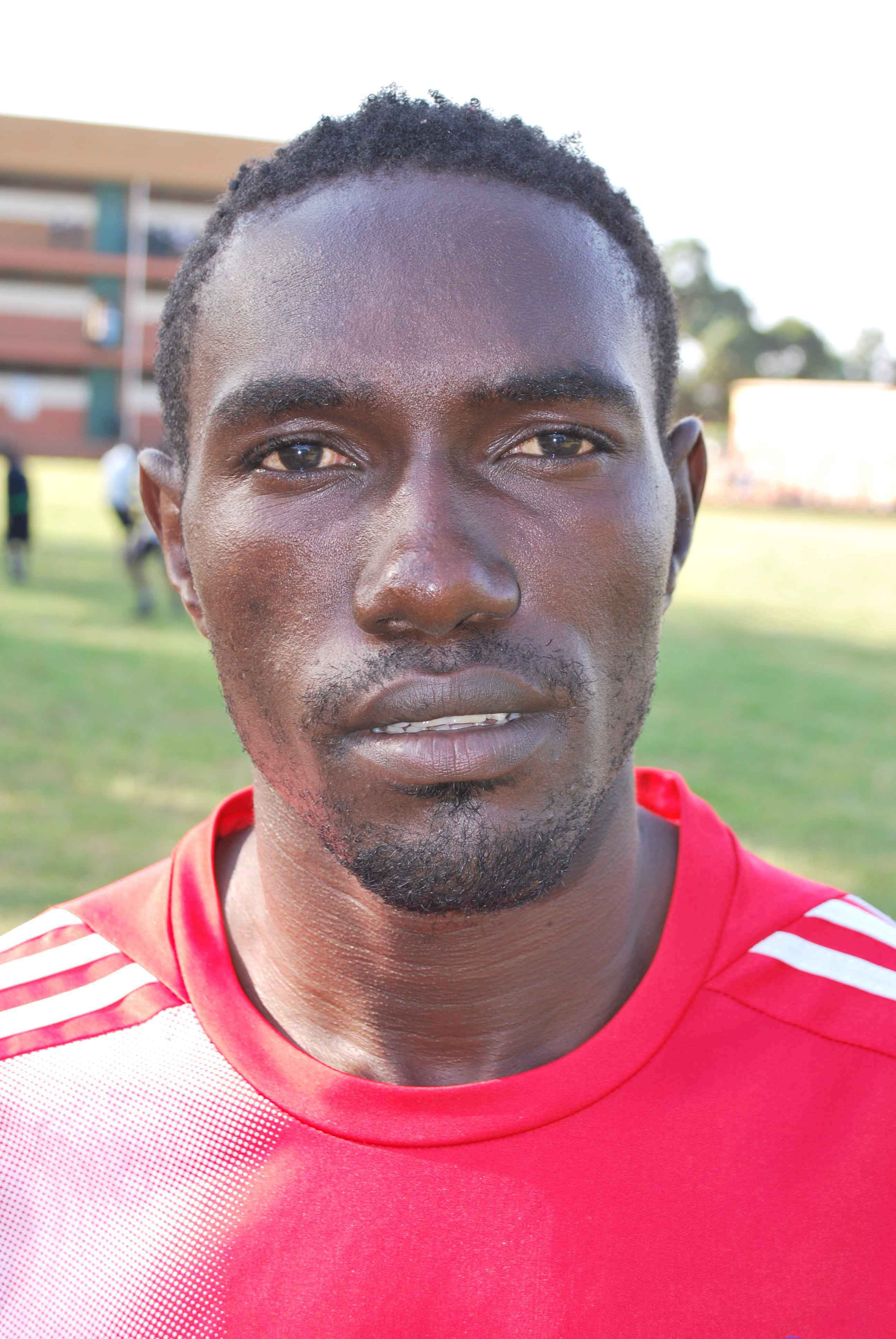
- Erisa Ssekisaambu

Personal information
- Full name: Erisa Ssekisambu
- Date of birth: 28 August 1995 (age 31)
- Place of birth: Wakiso, Uganda
- Height: 1.75 m (5 ft 9 in)
- Position: Forward

Team information
- Current team: Super Studio Malappuram

Senior career*
Years	Team	Apps	(Gls)
2011–2012	SC Villa	10	(2)
2012–2013	Express	13	(6)
2013–2014	URA	14	(7)
2014–2015	SC Villa	31	(14)
2015–2018	Vipers SC	78	(46)
2018–2019	Gor Mahia		
2019–2022	KCCA		
2022-2024	S.C. Kiyovu Sports		
2024-2025	Super Studio Malappuram		

International career^{‡}
2015–	Uganda	17	(4)
- * Club domestic league appearances and goals ‡ National team caps and goals as of 07:26, 18 September 2018 (UTC)

Erisa Ssekisambu (born 28 August 1995) is a Ugandan footballer who plays for Super Studio Malappuram in the All India Sevens Football and the Uganda national team as a midfielder.

== Career ==
Ssekisambu has featured for different clubs in Uganda such as SC Villa, Express, Uganda Revenue Authority SC, Vipers SC and of recent he played for currently in KCCA FC.

=== SC Villa ===
Ssekisambu started his career in 2011. He made his debut on 23 September 2011 against Police FC and he scored his first goal on 18 January 2011 against Gulu United, SC Villa won 4–0. Ssekisambu left SC Villa for Express hoping to get the playing time he had not got at Villa Park since coach Srdjan Zivojnov, had not given him the playing time.

=== Express ===
Ssekisambu joined Express in January 2012. He played his first game on 22 February 2012 against Water FC and the game ended 0–0. He scored his first goal against Masaka Local Council FC on 29 May 2012 and Express won 1–0.

=== Uganda Revenue Authority SC ===
In June 2012 Ssekisambu joined Uganda Revenue Authority SC from Express

=== SC Villa ===
Ssekisambu returned to SC Villa in 2015. He played against Soana FC as his first game on a comeback to SC Villa. He scored his first goal of the season against Express and the match ended in favour of SC Villa 2–1.

=== Vipers SC ===
In July 2015, Ssekisambu moved to Vipers SC in 2015., He played his first game against Bidco FC, Vipers SC won 1–0. He scored his first goal for Vipers SC against Saints FC. Ssekisambu completed the season with a tally of 16 goals even when some pundits argue that he scored 17 during the Uganda Premier League season of 2015–16 Sekisambu scored a historical goal for Vipers SC against Enyimba FC on 12 February 2016 in the preliminary round of CAF Champions League first leg.

=== Gor Mahia ===
On 1 November 2018, it was announced that Ssekisambu had joined Kenyan club Gor Mahia on a two-year contract. On 16 February 2019 he scored his first hattrick for Gor Mahia against Mount Kenya United.

== International career ==
On 20 June 2015, he made his senior debut on the Uganda against Tanzania and scored 2 goals on his debut. He was one of the shining stars at the 2016 CHAN Finals in Rwanda as he netted in the 2–2 draw with Mali.

In the 2014 African Nations Championship, Erisa was top scorer for Uganda.

== Career statistics ==
=== Club ===
As of 22 January 2012

Club	Season	League			Cup			AFC			Total		
Club	Season	Apps	Goals	Assists	Apps	Goals	Assists	Apps	Goals	Assists	Apps	Goals	Assists
Career total		0	0	0	0	0	0	0	0	0	0	0	0

=== International ===
As of match played 4 June 2016

Uganda
Year	Apps	Goals
2015	9	3
2016	7	1
2017	1	0
Total	17	4

== Honours ==
=== Club ===
Express

- Ugandan Premier League: 2011–12

Uganda Revenue Authority SC

- Uganda Cup: 2013–14:

SC Villa

- Ugandan Cup: 2014

Vipers SC

- Ugandan Cup: 2015–16
- Ugandan Premier League: 2017–18

=== Uganda ===
- CECAFA Cup: 2015

=== Individual ===
- Most Valuable Player Ugandan Cup: 2015, 2016
- Most Valuable Player Nominee Uganda Premier League: 2015
