= Zero liquid discharge =

Water treatment process used to remove liquid waste

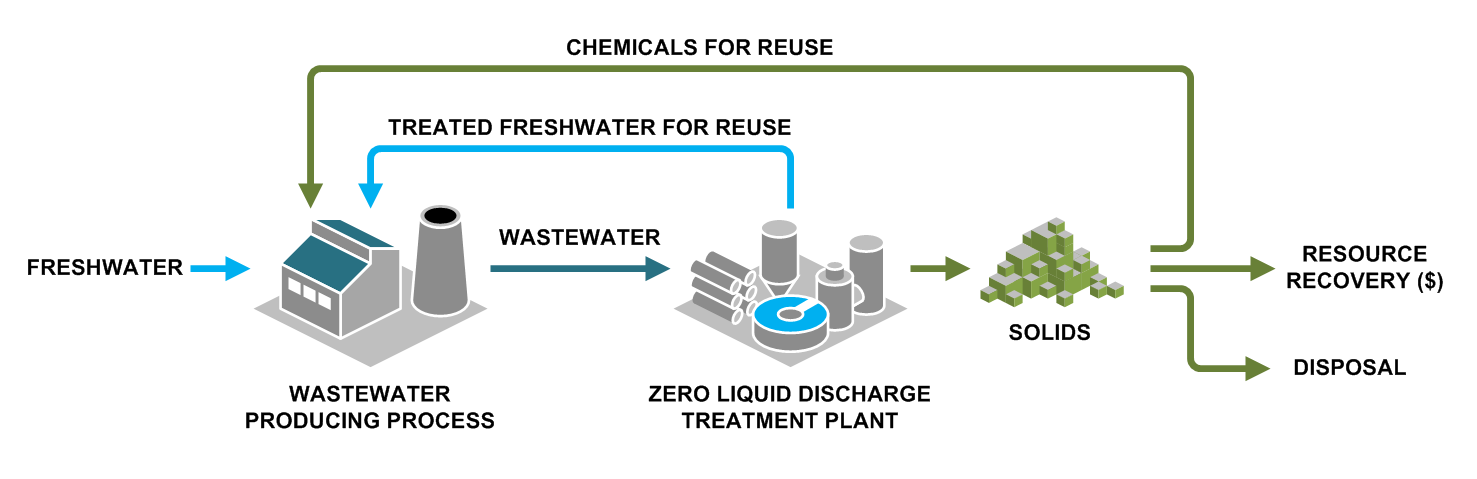
A Zero Liquid Discharge (ZLD) process diagram that highlights how wastewater from an industrial process is converted to solids and treated water for reuse via a ZLD plant.

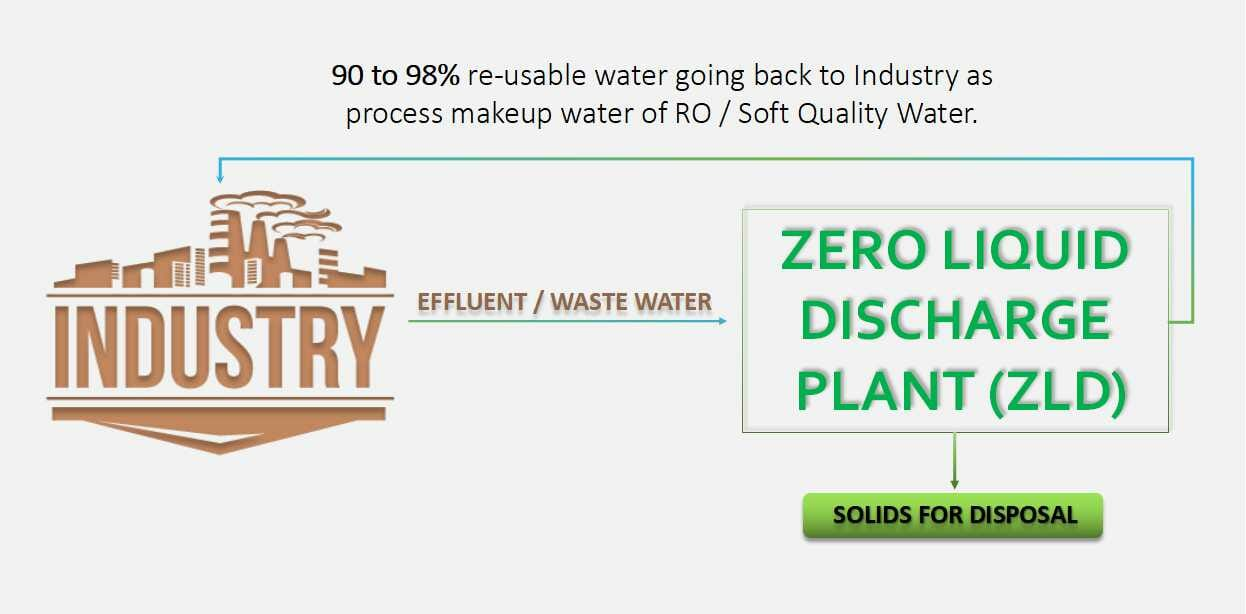
Concept of ZLD

Zero Liquid Discharge (ZLD) is a classification of water treatment processes intended to reduce wastewater efficiently and produce clean water that is suitable for reuse (e.g., irrigation). ZLD systems employ wastewater treatment technologies and desalination to purify and recycle virtually all wastewater received.

ZLD technologies help industrial facilities meet discharge and water reuse requirements, enabling them to meet government discharge regulations, reach higher water recovery (%), and treat and recover valuable materials from the wastewater streams such as potassium sulfate, caustic soda, sodium sulfate, lithium, and gypsum.

Thermal technologies are the conventional means to achieve ZLD, such as evaporators (for instance multi stage flash distillation), multi effect distillation, mechanical vapor compression, crystallization, and condensate recovery. ZLD plants produce solid waste.

== ZLD discharge system overview ==
ZLD processes begin with pre-treatment and evaporation of an industrial effluent until its dissolved solids precipitate. These precipitates are removed and dewatered with a filter press or a centrifuge. The water vapor from evaporation is condensed and returned to the process.

In the last few decades, there has been an effort from the water treatment industry to revolutionize high water recovery and ZLD technologies.

This has led to processes like electrodialysis, forward osmosis, and membrane distillation.

A quick overview and comparison can be seen in the following representative table:

Brine Treatment Technology	Electrical Energy (KWh/m3)	Thermal Energy (kWh/m3)	Total El. Equivalent (kWh/m3)	Typical Size (m3/d)	Investment ($/m3/d)	max TDS (mg/L)
Multistage Flash	3.68	77.5	38.56	<75,000	1,800	250,000
Multi-Effect Distillation	2.22	69.52	33.50	<28,000	1,375	250,000
Mechanical Vapor Compression	14.86	0	14.86	<3,000	1,750	250,000
Electrodialysis	6.73	0	6.73	/	/	150,000
Forward Osmosis	0.475	65.4	29.91	/	/	200,000
Membrane Distillation	2.03	100.85	47.41	/	/	250,000

Table 1, Specific Energy Consumptions (SECs) of Brine Treatment Technologies, Multistage Flash (MSF), Multi-Effect Distillation (MED), Mechanical Vapor Compression (MVC), Electrodialysis (ED/EDR), Forward Osmosis (FO), Membrane Distillation. The energy consumption values are the average of 13 comparative studies on ZLD technologies ranging from 2002 to 2017. Clarifications are needed for ED/EDR, FO and MD.
1. ED/EDR SEC depends on the salinity of the feed as higher salinities require higher SECs
2. FO SEC depends on the Draw Solution and the Regeneration Method. Most papers assume the use of thermolytic salts and their regeneration at a 60°C temperature. 90% of the thermal energy needed can be acquired by waste heat if it's available
3. MD SEC depends on the configuration. Most common MD configuration in the studies is Direct Contact MD (DCMD) due to its simplicity. 90% of the thermal energy needed can be acquired by waste heat if it's available and finally
4. the total electrical equivalent was taken using the following, Total El. Equivalent = El. Energy + 0.45 x Thermal Energy due to modern power plant efficiency (according to relevant paper).

== Configuration ==
Despite the variable sources of a wastewater stream, a ZLD system is generally comprised by two steps:

1. Pre-Concentration: Pre-concentrating a brine is usually achieved with membrane brine concentrators or electrodialysis. These technologies concentrate a stream to a high salinity and are able to recover up to 60–80% of the water.
2. Evaporation/Crystallization: The next step, using thermal processes or evaporation, evaporates all the leftover water, collects it, and sends it to reuse. The waste that is left behind then goes to a crystallizer that boils all the water until all its impurities crystallize and can be filtered out as solids.

== See also ==
- Effluent guidelines (US wastewater regulations)
- Effluent limitation
