= Caesar Okhuti =

Ugandan footballer (born 1990)

Personal information
- Date of birth: 7 October 1990 (age 36)
- Place of birth: Arua, Uganda
- Height: 1.82 m (6 ft 0 in)
- Position: Forward

Team information
- Current team: Arua Hill
- Number: 29

Youth career
- Mvara Junior: Mvara, Ediofe Hills

Senior career*
Years	Team	Apps	(Gls)
2006–2008	Ediofe Hills FC		
2008–2012	Bunamwaya SC		
2011	Vissai Ninh Bình		
2012–2014	Vipers SC		(4)
2014–2015	El Nasir FC		
2015	Onduparaka FC		
2015–2016	Express FC		
2016	KCCA FC		
2017–2019	Onduparaka FC		
2020–2021	Arua Hill SC		

International career
2007–2016	Uganda	31	(8)
- * Club domestic league appearances and goals

Caesar Okhuti (born 7 October 1990) is a Ugandan coach and retired footballer. He captained Arua Hill Sports Club from the FUFA Big League to the Ugandan Premier League in 2021. Okhuti was part of the promoted Onduparaka FC team in 2016. He once played for Express and KCCA FC but was loaned back to Onduparaka FC for the 2016/17 season. He won the league with Bunamwaya SC in 2010 and KCCA FC in 2016. He retired from professional football on 17 August 2021 after winning the StarTimes FUFA Big League Final with Arua Hill SC.

Okhuti won the regional Uganda Secondary School Sports Association with Mvara Secondary School as their head coach and guided them to the national championships.

== Senior career ==
Okhuti started his career in 2007 with a brace for Arua-based Ugandan Super League debutants Ediofe Hills FC against URA FC. He was called up to the Ugandan national team by coach Laszlo Csaba later that year. The following year, Bunamwaya S.C. bought him for a national record 12 million shillings. A back injury in September 2008 laid him off for two months but he returned to end the season as third highest scorer with 18 goals. He was named in the 2009 African Championship of Nations Uganda squad. In 2010, Okhuti helped Bunamwaya win their first USL title.

On 20 May 2011, Okhuti signed a contract with Vissai Ninh Bình in Vietnam's V.League 1 where he scored four goals within three months. He returned in January 2012 to play for Bunamwaya.

In 2014, Okhuti joined South Sudan's El Nasir, but the following season returned home to help Arua-based Onduparaka FC get promotion in the Ugandan Big League.

On Saturday 5 December 2015 at Addis Ababa Stadium in Ethiopia, Okhuti headed in the only goal against Rwanda to win a record-extending 14th CECAFA Senior Challenge Cup for Uganda. It was the fourth time Uganda had defeated Rwanda in the final (2003, 2009, 1011, 2015) and first time Uganda's Serbian Coach Milutin "Micho" Sredojevic had won it, having lost four years behind to Uganda while coaching Rwanda. Caesar scored three goals in the tournament like his captain and St. Mary's Kitende old boy Farouk Miya. Okhuti attributes his comeback to "change of attitude". It was his second CECAFA (Council for East and Central African Football Associations) Cup win.

Okhuti was included in the Ugandan squad for CHAN 2016.

As a free agent, he joined KCCA FC. In September 2016, KCCA loaned him for six months to Onduparaka, the newly promoted side from Arua. FUFA cleared him to play for Onduparaka on 28 September 2016 and three days later he scored once in a 4-3 win over SC Villa. He remained there up to 2019.

Okhuti then signed for Arua Hill SC and made his debut against Blacks Power on 25 March 2021, scoring once in a 3-1 win. After captaining the FUFA Big League Invincibles to the Ugandan Premier League with five goals in nine matches, Okhuti won the BL Final at the FUFA Technical Centre in Njeru on 17 August 2021 and retired from playing professional football.
