= Hawassa =

Capital of Sidama Region, Ethiopia

Hawassa አዋሳ (Amharic) Awassa Awasa
- Capital city
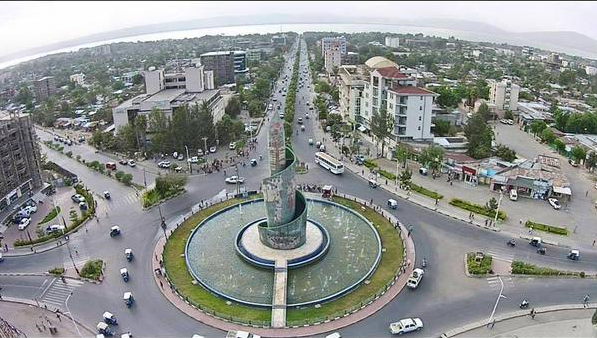
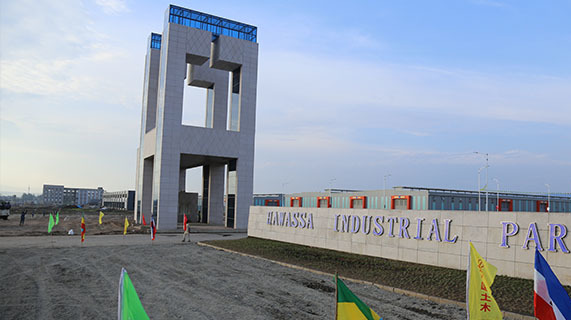
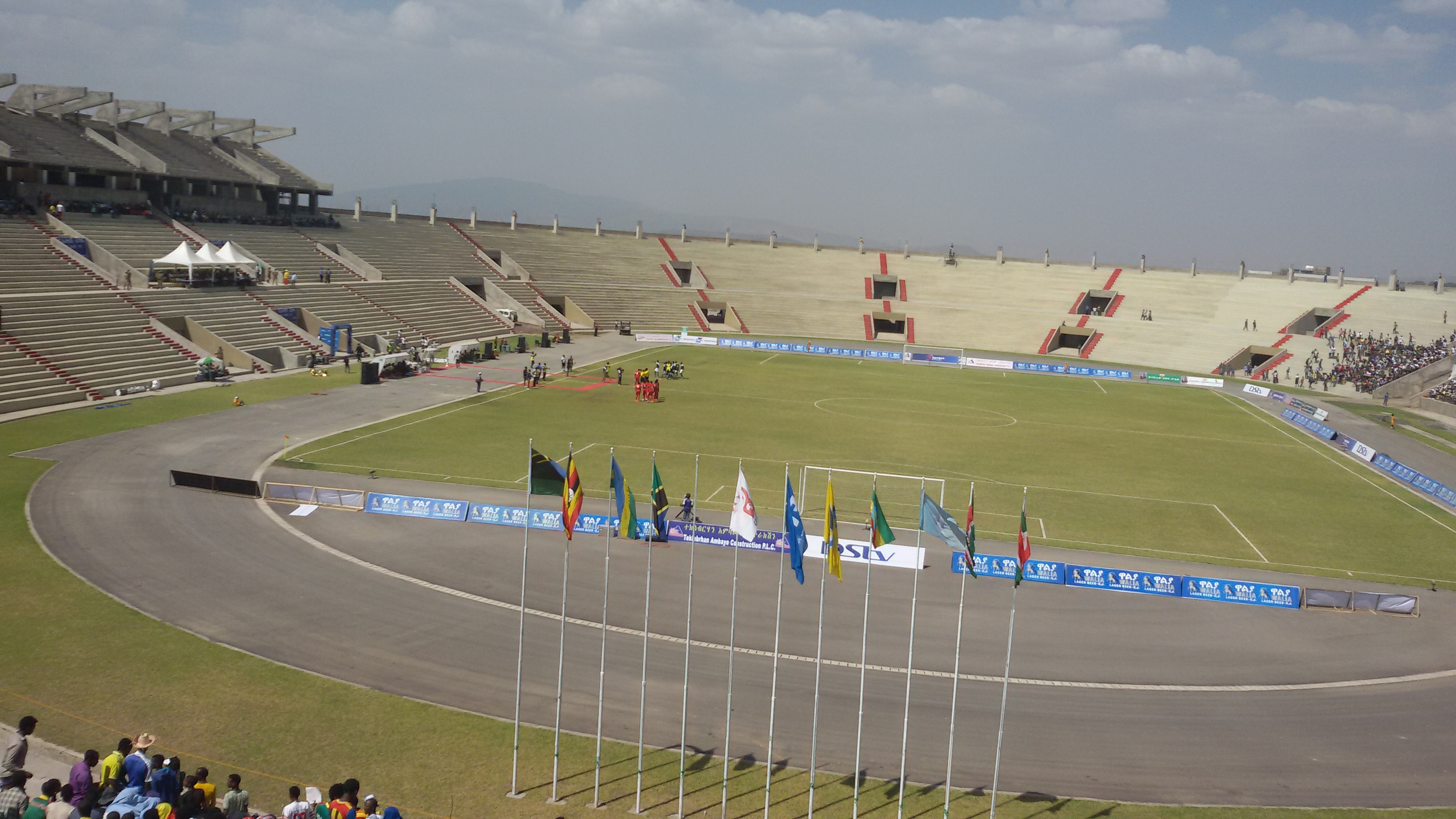
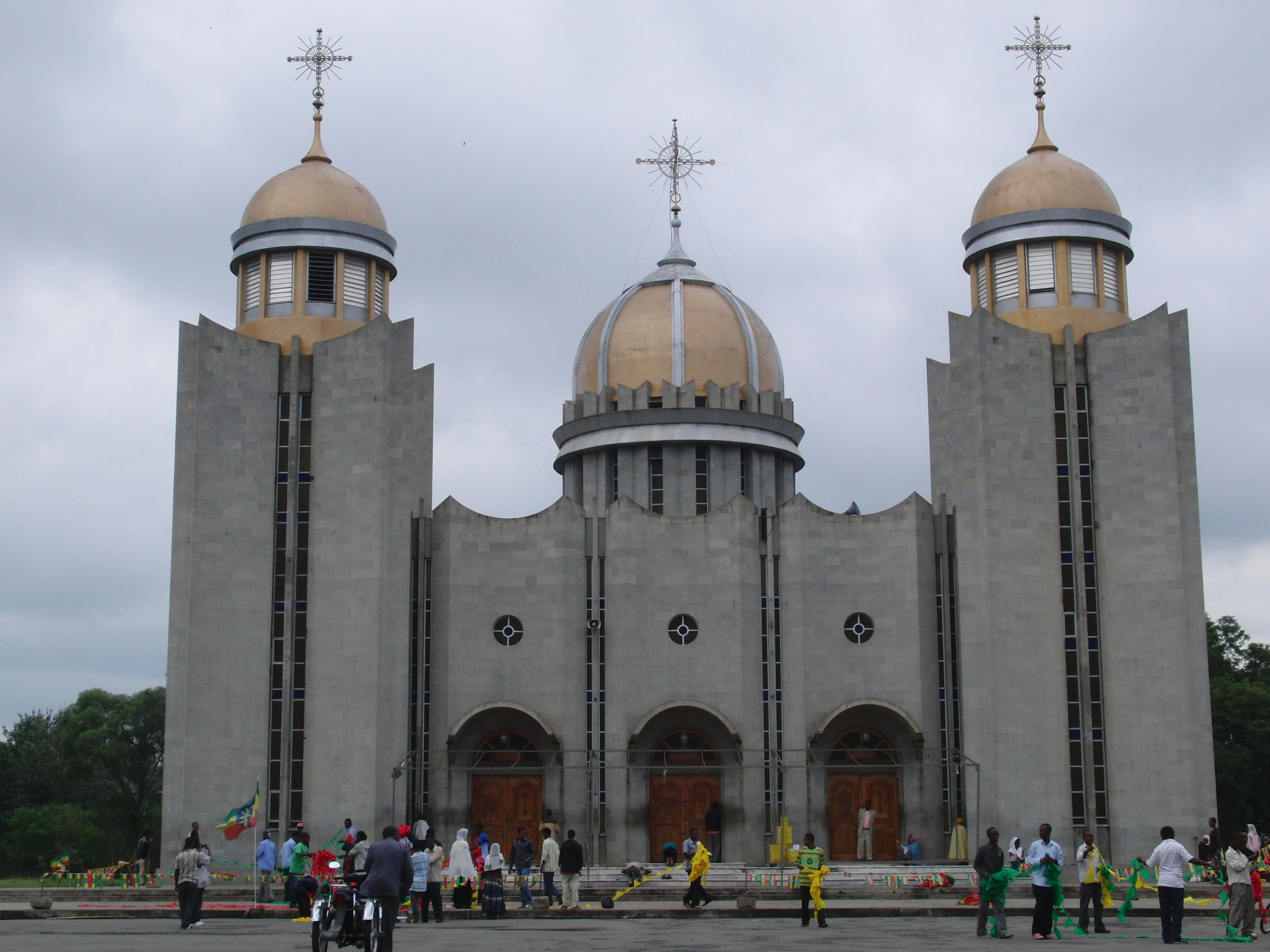
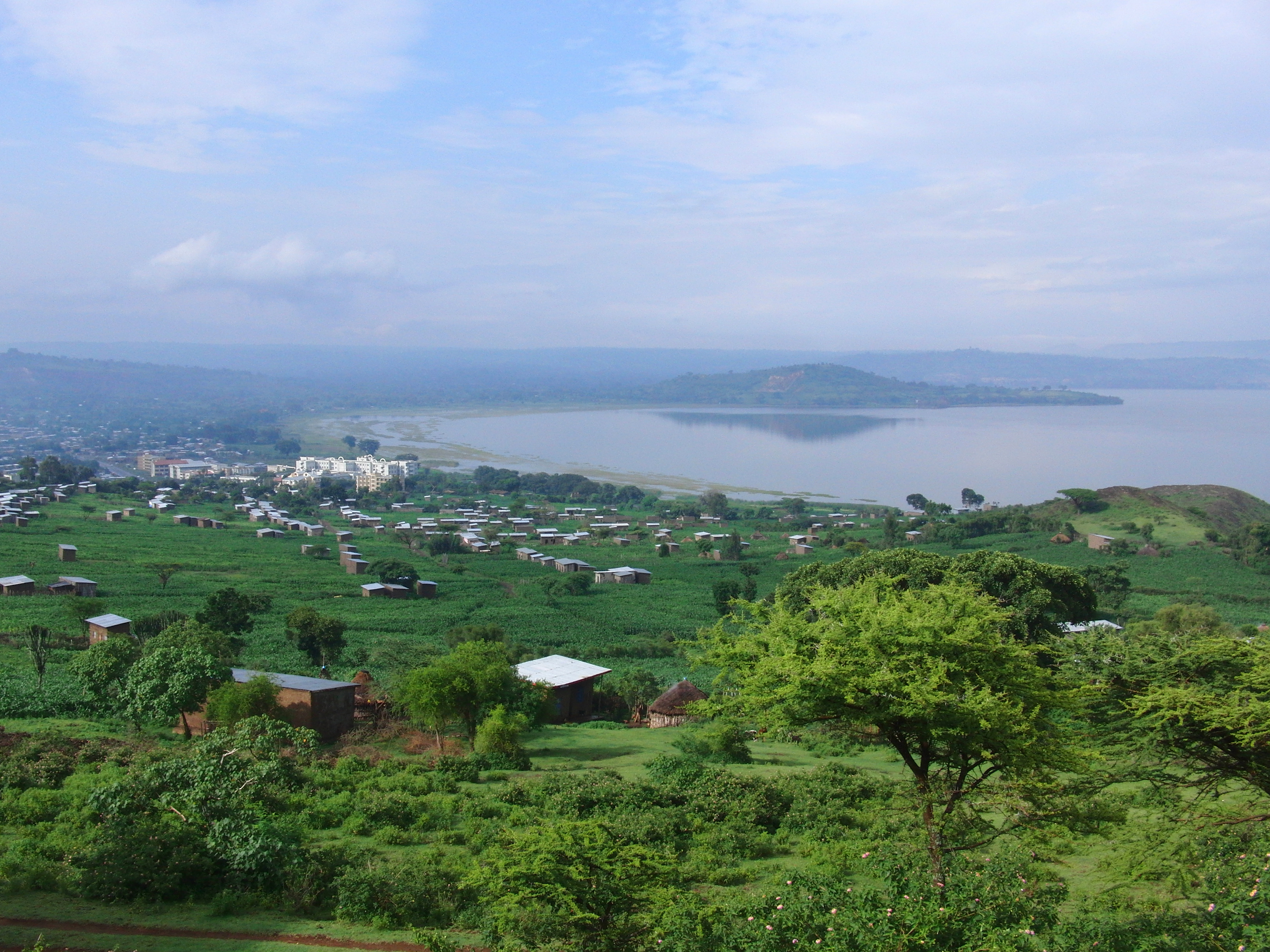
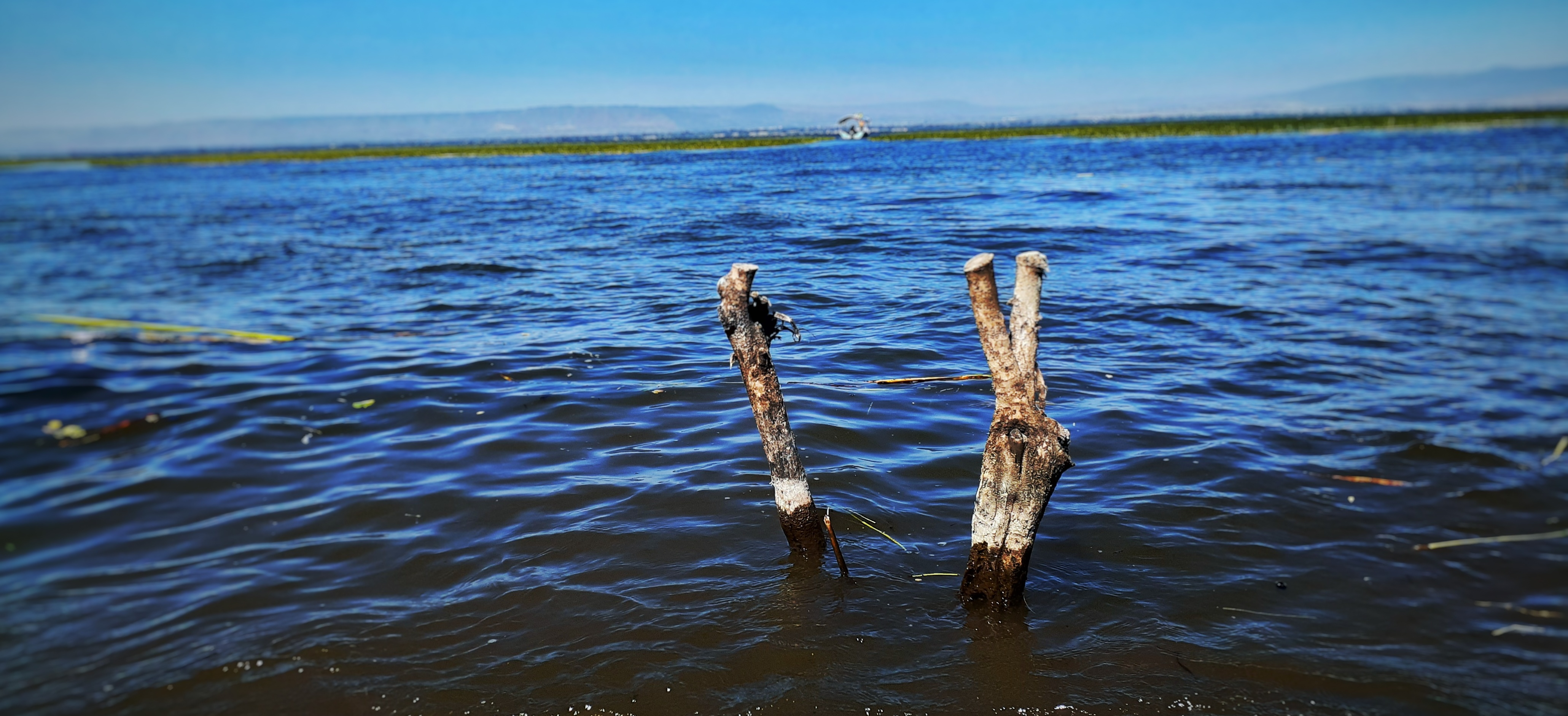
- From top: Sidama Monument, Hawassa Industrial Park, Hawassa Kenema Stadium, St. Gabriel Church; outskirt view, Lake Hawassa

- Location within Ethiopia Location within the Horn of Africa Location within Africa
- Coordinates: 7°3′N 38°28′E
- Country: Ethiopia
- Region: (Sidama Region) Sidama
- Founded: 1958
- Founder: Haile Selassie

Government
  - Mayor: Tiratu Beyene Biltu

Area
  - Total: 50 km^{2} (19 sq mi)
- Elevation: 1,708 m (5,604 ft)

Population (2007)
  - Total: 258,808
  - Estimate (2023): 577,075
  - Density: 5,200/km^{2} (13,000/sq mi)
- Time zone: UTC+3 (EAT)
- Area code: 46
- Climate: Aw

Hawassa (Amharic: አዋሳ; ʾäwasa, also spelled Awassa or Awasa), known historically as Adare, is a city in Ethiopia, on the shores of Lake Hawassa in the Great Rift Valley. It is 273 km (170 mi) south of Addis Ababa via Bishoftu, 130 km (81 mi) east of Sodo, and 75 km (47 mi) north of Dilla. The town serves as the capital of the Sidama Region. It lies on the Trans-African Highway 4 Cairo-Cape Town and has a latitude and longitude of 7°3′N 38°28′E and an elevation of 1,708 meters (5,604 ft) above sea level. Its name comes from a Sidama word meaning "wide body of water".

The city is home to Hawassa University a major university in the country (which includes Wondo Genet College of Forestry and Natural Resources, an Agricultural College, the Main Campus, and a Health Sciences College), Awasa Adventist College, and a major market. The city is served by Awasa Airport (ICAO code HALA, IATA AWA), opened in 1988. Postal service is provided by the main branch; electricity and telephone service are also available. Important local attractions include the St. Gabriel Church and the Awassa Kenema Stadium. Fishing is a major local industry.

Hawassa was capital of the former Sidamo Province from about 1978 until the province was abolished with the adoption of the 1995 Constitution. It then became the capital of the Southern Nations, Nationalities, and Peoples' Region. When the Sidama Region was formed in June 2020, the city became part of that region. Hawassa currently serves as the capital of both the Sidama Region and the Southern Nations, Nationalities, and Peoples' Region. Hawassa will continue to serve as the seat of government of the Southern Nations, Nationalities, and Peoples' Region for two national electoral cycles, after which the regional government will move to a city within the region's boundaries.

== History ==
In 1957, with Ras Mengesha Seyoum at the head of the Sidamo Governorate General, Emperor Haile Selassie became greatly interested in establishing a new town in the area where the city is now located. The area appealed to the emperor on many levels. It was located on the important Addis Abeba– Moyale (Kenya) highway; its flat, expansive topography was conducive to city building; and the nearby tourist attractions of Lake Hawassa and the Dume hill (later named Tabor) provided a dramatic backdrop to the area.

In 1958, upon the order of the emperor, a seasonal palace for him was built along Lake Awasa in an area called Kutuwa. The building of the palace intensified interest in the area among many people, most notably the empress herself proceeded to lay claim to extensive hectares of land in the name of the emperor. As the town grew, more than three thousand people who were living in the area were displaced. Dubale (2010) also notes that a political dispute accompanied the displacement of the Sidama from the Hawassa area. Governor Ras Mengesha Seyoum (r.1955–1960) enthusiastically supported the urbanization of the area, regardless of its impact on the Sidama who had been living there, while succeeding Governor Ras Andargachew Mesay (r. 1960–1965) was much more concerned with the impact of this displacement on the Sidama people. Ras Andargachew Mesay refused to endorse the implementation of a large mechanized farming project in and around the Hawassa area by the Ministry of National Development unless he was guaranteed alternative land for the thousands of Sidama households. Their houses were simply bulldozed without any prior notification and compensation. However, despite his efforts to delay or block the displacement of the Sidama by the emerging city plan and the mechanized farming scheme, the government was not deterred from its intentions and many Sidama were pushed out of the city and its surrounding areas.

Following the displacement, about four hundred heads of families who served in the war against the Italian aggression from 1935 to 1941 were brought from Wukro and Korem (northern Ethiopia), Harar (eastern Ethiopia) and Addis Ababa and awarded land to settle in Hawassa. The places they settled still bear the names of their places of origin.

In 1960 the office of the vice district governorate moved from Hawella Tulla to Hawassa. In 1962 a municipality was founded. The shift of the political center to Hawassa was not an immediate or easy decision, as there was significant opposition from the landlords in Yirgalem who benefited substantially from having the political center in their city. Initially, when Sidamaland was incorporated into the ‘modern Ethiopian empire’, the political center had been at Hagereselam (85 kilometres from Hawassa); during Ras Desta Damtew's reign the center shifted to Yirgalem in 1941. In the brief period of the Italian occupation, the Italians shifted the center to Aposto, a small roadside town located at the entrance of Yirgalem town and along the paved road connecting Addis Abeba and Moyale (Kenya).

Finally, the political center shifted to Hawassa in 1968; until the fall of the imperial regime in 1974, it served as a capital of the Sidamo Governorate General (Sidamo Teklay Gizat), which included Sidama, Wolayta, Gedeo, Jemjem, Borena and Arero. In 1974, the Derg military regime established Hawassa as the capital of its Sidamo district (Kifle Hager). Later on during the transitional government Hawassa became a capital of region 8 and soon after as a capital of Southern Nations, Nationalities, and Peoples' Region and later the Sidama Region.

The city of Hawassa is one of the fast-growing cities in the region and it has a city administration consisting of eight sub-cities and urban as well as rural kebeles. The sub-cities are Addis Ketema, Hayk Dar, Bahil Adarash, Misrak, Menahreya, Tabor, Mehal Ketema and Tula.

== Population ==
=== Demographics ===
Based on the 2007 Census conducted by the Central Statistical Agency of Ethiopia, this zone had a total population of 258,808, of whom 133,123 were male and 125,685 female. While 157,879 or 61% were living in the city of Hawassa, the rest of the population of this zone was living in surrounding rural kebeles. A total of 61,279 households were counted in this zone, which results in an average of 4.22 persons to a household, and 57,469 housing units.

The five largest ethnic groups reported in Awasa were the Sidama (48.68%), the Amhara (15.43%), the Welayta (13.90%), the Oromo (5.21%), and the Gurage (4.33%); all other ethnic groups made up 12.45% of the population. Sidamo is spoken as a first language by 47.97% of the inhabitants, 31.01% speak Amharic, 9.58% speak Welayta, 2.53% Oromiffa,1.98% Gurage, and 1.82% Kambatta; the remaining 5.09% spoke all other primary languages reported. The 1994 census reported this town had a total population of 69,169 of whom 35,029 were male and 34,140 were female.

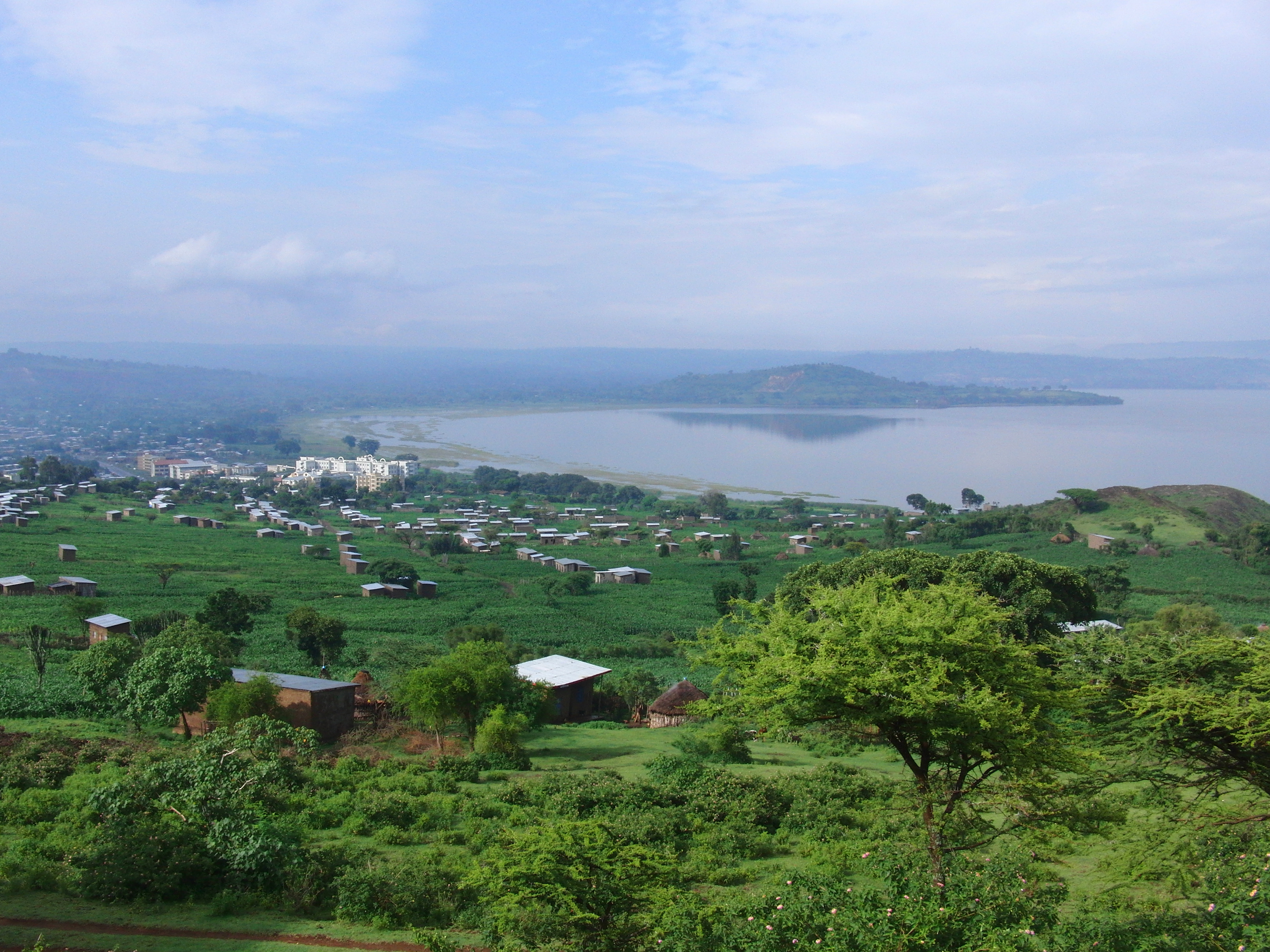
Hawassa outskirts and lakeshore

=== Economy ===
The Hawassa Industrial Park (HIP) is an eco-industrial park situated on the outskirts of the city. It was established on 13 July 2016 and inaugurated by Prime Minister Hailemariam Desalegn. Focusing on apparel and fabric production, the government-backed initiative initially covered 130 hectares, offering the possibility to expand up to a total of 400 hectares. The park features a zero liquid discharge (ZLD) facility, enabling companies to meet stringent environmental standards required by international markets.

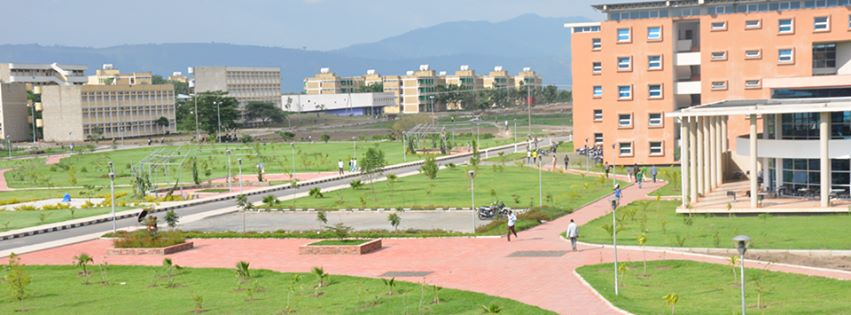
Hawassa University's main campus

At its peak, the Hawassa Industrial Park employed over 35,000 workers. The park faced significant challenges in 2022 due to factory closures and job losses following the United States government's decision to remove Ethiopia from the African Growth and Opportunity Act's duty-free access to US markets. However, between October 2022 and January 2023, the park generated US$32 million in revenue, indicating a potential revival of the sector following the Pretoria peace agreement.

=== Religion ===
52.71% of the population said they were Protestants, 39.99% practiced Ethiopian Orthodox Christianity, 7.30% were Muslim and 3.78% embraced Catholicism. The Latin Catholic minority is pastorally served by the missionary Apostolic Vicariate of Awasa, which has its Cathedral of Kidane-Meheret here.

== Sport ==
Football (soccer) and swimming are the most played games in Hawassa. Hawassa City S.C. (Amharic: ሀዋሳ ከተማ), a football club based in Hawassa—like Debub Police S.C. and Sidama Coffee S.C.—and using the Awassa Kenema Stadium, was the first to win the Ethiopian Premier League from outside of Addis Ababa, the capital. In addition to winning the league twice, the club took part twice in CAF Champions League. Other sports like basketball—represented by Hawassa City BC—and skateboarding are becoming popular among the youth. Biking and running competitions are occasionally held on the main streets of the town.

== Education ==
Hawassa University, established in 1999 through the merger of a number of higher education institutions, is based in the city. Info link College is the first private engineering college found in Hawassa. Africa Beza College campus is also in the city. Hawassa University is the first university in Ethiopia to offer a Hotel Management degree program.

== Climate ==
Hawassa has a tropical savanna climate (Köppen Aw) though it borders on a subtropical highland climate (Köppen Cwb). There are two seasons: a lengthy though not intense wet season from March to October and a short dry season from November to February. The extra cloudiness of the wet season is sufficient to make it substantially cooler than the dry season despite a higher sun angle; however, the coolest morning temperatures, often close to freezing, occur during the dry season.

Climate data for Hawassa
Month	Jan	Feb	Mar	Apr	May	Jun	Jul	Aug	Sep	Oct	Nov	Dec	Year
Record high °C (°F)	32.6 (90.7)	33.0 (91.4)	33.5 (92.3)	33.6 (92.5)	31.4 (88.5)	30.2 (86.4)	28.8 (83.8)	29.2 (84.6)	29.2 (84.6)	30.5 (86.9)	31.6 (88.9)	31.3 (88.3)	33.6 (92.5)
Mean daily maximum °C (°F)	28.4 (83.1)	29.2 (84.6)	29.3 (84.7)	27.9 (82.2)	26.6 (79.9)	25.2 (77.4)	23.6 (74.5)	24.1 (75.4)	25.0 (77.0)	26.2 (79.2)	27.5 (81.5)	27.9 (82.2)	26.7 (80.1)
Mean daily minimum °C (°F)	10.4 (50.7)	11.6 (52.9)	12.5 (54.5)	13.6 (56.5)	13.8 (56.8)	13.9 (57.0)	14.0 (57.2)	13.9 (57.0)	13.1 (55.6)	11.8 (53.2)	9.4 (48.9)	9.2 (48.6)	12.3 (54.1)
Record low °C (°F)	0.8 (33.4)	3.0 (37.4)	5.1 (41.2)	6.5 (43.7)	9.0 (48.2)	8.5 (47.3)	7.7 (45.9)	7.2 (45.0)	7.5 (45.5)	3.5 (38.3)	0.5 (32.9)	−2.8 (27.0)	−2.8 (27.0)
Average rainfall mm (inches)	29 (1.1)	44 (1.7)	100 (3.9)	147 (5.8)	133 (5.2)	99 (3.9)	128 (5.0)	125 (4.9)	140 (5.5)	92 (3.6)	30 (1.2)	24 (0.9)	1,091 (42.7)
Average rainy days (≥ 0.1 mm)	5	8	16	16	16	15	19	20	22	14	5	4	160
Average relative humidity (%) (daily average)	47	45	47	63	68	68	70	71	73	64	54	49	60
Average dew point °C (°F)	10 (50)	10 (50)	11 (52)	14 (57)	15 (59)	15 (59)	14 (57)	15 (59)	15 (59)	14 (57)	12 (54)	10 (50)	13 (55)
Source 1: National Meteorology Agency (average high and low, extremes)
Source 2: World Meteorological Organization (rainfall 1981–2010) Time and Date (dewpoints and humidity, 2005–2015)
