= Bahir Dar Stadium =

Stadium in Bahir Dar, Ethiopia

Coordinates: 11°35′4.3″N 37°22′58.6″E

- ባሕር ዳር ስታዲየም
- Interactive map of Bahir Dar Stadium
- Full name: Bahir Dar National Stadium
- Location: Bahir Dar, Amhara Region, Ethiopia
- Capacity: 52,000
- Surface: Paspalum

Construction
- Built: 2015
- Renovated: 2021–present

Tenants
- Bahir Dar Kenema FC (2015–present); Ethiopia national football team (selected matches)

Bahir Dar Stadium (Amharic: ባሕር ዳር ስታዲየም) is a multi-purpose venue located in Bahir Dar, Amhara Region of Ethiopia. Primarily used for football matches, the stadium also features facilities for athletics. With a capacity of 52,000 spectators, it is among the largest stadiums in Ethiopia. Currently, the stadium is undergoing renovations and reconstruction, which are expected to be completed by the end of 2026.

== History ==
The construction of Bahir Dar Stadium began in 2008 by MIDROC Ethiopia and completed in 2015. In February 2015, the stadium gained recognition from CAF and FIFA hosting its first international matches .

The stadium hosted the first international CAF Confederation Cup match between Dedebit F.C. and Cote d'or of Seychelles in March 2015. On June 14, 2015, Bahir Dar Stadium hosted 2017 Africa Cup of Nations qualification match between Ethiopia and Lesotho. The game was attended by more than 70,000 spectators which was over the capacity of the stadium. Less than a week later, on June 21, 2015, Bahir Dar Stadium hosted the 2016 African Nations Championship qualification match between Ethiopia and Kenya in front of more than 60,000 spectators. In November 2015, the Bahir Dar Stadium was selected as one of the three host venue for the 2015 CECAFA Cup.

Due to the Bahir Dar Stadium's large seating capacity and the significant revenue it produces, the Ethiopian Football Federation registered the Bahir Dar stadium as one of the national team's home venues, along with the Addis Ababa National Stadium in Addis Ababa. The Stadium also hosted large music concerts in Ethiopia such as Teddy Afro's "Wede Fikir Guzo" (translated as 'A Journey for love') on January 21 2018.

In October 2021, CAF suspended the Bahir Dar Stadium from hosting international competitions. Muhammed F. Sidat, CAF's club licensing senior manager, stated that the stadium failed to meet at least seven key requirements set by CAF. These included inadequate medical facilities, as well as insufficient VIP, media, and training centers.

== Reconstruction and Renovation ==
Following the suspension of the Confederation of African Football (CAF) in October 2021, the Amhara regional government, in collaboration with the Federal government of Ethiopia, began renovating and constructing the Bahir Dar Stadium to meet the minimum standards set by CAF and FIFA. The project, which has a budget of 2.2 billion Ethiopian birr, is being carried out by Ethiopian construction company MIDROC and the French firm Gregori. The renovations and construction of the stadium are expected to be fully completed by the end of 2026. Once finished, the Bahir Dar Stadium is anticipated to meet CAF Category 4 standards, making it a premier venue for prestigious African club competitions, national team matches, and events such as the Africa Cup of Nations.
