= Hawassa Kenema Stadium =

Stadium in Hawassa, Ethiopia

Coordinates: 7.0421°N 38.4766°E

Hawassa Stadium
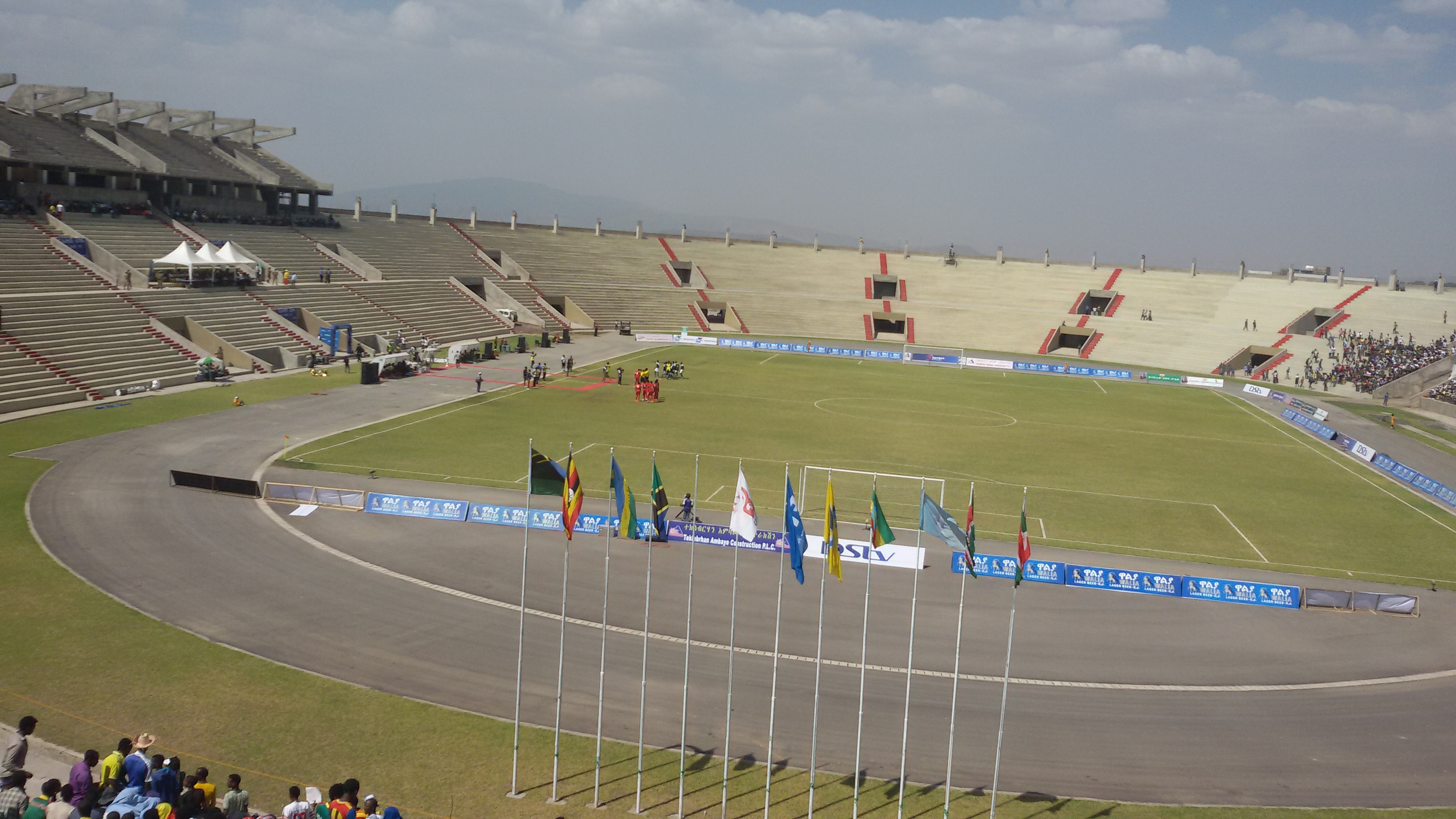
- Hawassa Kenema Stadium in 2015
- Interactive map of Hawassa Stadium
- Full name: Hawassa International Stadium
- Location: Hawassa, Sidama Region, Ethiopia
- Capacity: 40,000
- Surface: Grass

Tenants
- Hawassa City S.C. Ethiopia national football team (selected matches)

Hawassa Kenema Stadium is a multi-purpose stadium in Hawassa, Sidama Region, Ethiopia. It is used mostly for football matches and serves as the home stadium of Hawassa City S.C. The stadium has a capacity of 60,000 people, but still on process.

== History ==
The stadium hosted group matches of the 2015 CECAFA Senior Challenge Cup. The stadium hosted the Ethiopian National team's 2017 AFCON qualifier against Seychelles in September 2016 after being given approval from CAF. The stadium hosted Wolaitta Dicha's victory over Egyptian side Zamalek (2-1) in the first leg of the preliminary round of the 2018 CAF Confederations Cup. In 2018, the stadium hosted a 2019 AFCON qualifier played between Ethiopia and Sierra Leone. In April 2018, the stadium hosted a rally for the Ethiopian Prime Minister Abiy Ahmed in which crowd of 60,000 people attended.
