= 2021 Africa Cup of Nations Group A =

Football tournament group stage

Group A of the 2021 Africa Cup of Nations took place from 9 to 17 January 2022. The group consisted of Burkina Faso, hosts Cameroon, Cape Verde and Ethiopia.

Cameroon and Burkina Faso as the top two teams, along with Cape Verde as one of the four best third-placed teams, advanced to the round of 16.

== Teams ==
Draw position	Team	Zone	Method of qualification	Date of qualification	Finals appearance	Last appearance	Previous best performance	FIFA Rankings	
Draw position	Team	Zone	Method of qualification	Date of qualification	Finals appearance	Last appearance	Previous best performance	May 2021 (Note: The rankings of May 2021 were used for seeding for the final draw.)	December 2021
A1	Cameroon	UNIFFAC	Hosts and Group F winners	8 January 2019	20th	2019	Winners (1984, 1988, 2000, 2002, 2017)	55	50
A2	Burkina Faso	WAFU	Group B winners	24 March 2021	12th	2017	Runners-up (2013)	60	60
A3	Cape Verde	WAFU	Group F runners-up	30 March 2021	3rd	2015	Quarter-finals (2013)	73	73
A4	Ethiopia	CECAFA	Group K runners-up	30 March 2021	11th	2013	Winners (1962)	140	137

== Standings ==
Pos	Team	Pld	W	D	L	GF	GA	GD	Pts	Qualification
1	Cameroon (H)	3	2	1	0	7	3	+4	7	Advance to knockout stage
2	Burkina Faso	3	1	1	1	3	3	0	4 (Note: Head-to-head result: Cape Verde 0–1 Burkina Faso.)	Advance to knockout stage
3	Cape Verde	3	1	1	1	2	2	0	4	Advance to knockout stage
4	Ethiopia	3	0	1	2	2	6	−4	1	

Source: CAF
Rules for classification: Group stage tiebreakers
(H) Hosts

== Matches ==
=== Cameroon vs Burkina Faso ===
9 January 2022
17:00

Cameroon	2–1	Burkina Faso
Aboubakar 40' (pen.), 45+3' (pen.)	Report	Sangaré 24'

Olembe Stadium, Yaoundé
Referee: Mustapha Ghorbal (Algeria)

Cameroon	Burkina Faso

GK	24	André Onana
RB	19	Collins Fai
CB	22	Jérôme Onguéné	(yellow card) 42'
CB	5	Michael Ngadeu-Ngadjui
LB	25	Nouhou Tolo
DM	14	Samuel Gouet
RM	3	Moumi Ngamaleu		(substituted off) 81'
CM	15	Pierre Kunde		(substituted off) 69'
CM	8	André-Frank Zambo Anguissa
LM	12	Karl Toko Ekambi		(substituted off) 69'
CF	10	Vincent Aboubakar (c)		(substituted off) 88'
Substitutions:
FW	13	Eric Maxim Choupo-Moting		(substituted on) 69'
FW	7	Clinton N'Jie		(substituted on) 69'
FW	11	Christian Bassogog		(substituted on) 81'
MF	28	Yvan Neyou		(substituted on) 88'
Manager:
(Portugal) Toni Conceição

GK	16	Hervé Koffi
RB	9	Issa Kaboré
CB	14	Issoufou Dayo
CB	25	Steeve Yago	(yellow card) 1'
LB	5	Patrick Malo	(yellow card) 32'
CM	24	Adama Guira
CM	22	Blati Touré
RW	10	Bertrand Traoré (c)		(substituted off) 86'
AM	20	Gustavo Sangaré
LW	21	Cyrille Bayala		(substituted off) 71'
CF	15	Abdoul Tapsoba		(substituted off) 71'
Substitutions:
FW	11	Mohamed Konaté		(substituted on) 71'
FW	17	Zakaria Sanogo		(substituted on) 71'
FW	19	Hassane Bandé		(substituted on) 86'
Manager:
Kamou Malo

Man of the Match:
Vincent Aboubakar (Cameroon)

Assistant referees:
Abdelhak Etchiali (Algeria)
Mokrane Gourari (Algeria)
Fourth official:
Haythem Guirat (Tunisia)
Video assistant referee:
Adil Zourak (Morocco)
Assistant video assistant referee:
Zakaria Brinsi (Morocco)

=== Ethiopia vs Cape Verde ===
9 January 2022
20:00

Ethiopia	0–1	Cape Verde
	Report	J. Tavares 45+1'

Olembe Stadium, Yaoundé
Referee: Hélder Martins de Carvalho (Angola)

Ethiopia	Cape Verde

GK	22	Teklemariam Shanko
RB	2	Suleman Hamid
CB	15	Aschalew Tamene	(yellow card) 39'
CB	16	Yared Bayeh	(red card) 12'
LB	20	Ramadan Yusef
CM	3	Mesud Mohammed		(substituted off) 15'
CM	8	Amanuel Yohannes
CM	7	Surafel Dagnachew		(substituted off) 82'
RF	11	Amanuel Gebremichael		(substituted off) 62'
CF	9	Getaneh Kebede (c)		(substituted off) 62'
LF	10	Abubeker Nassir		(substituted off) 82'
Substitutions:
DF	4	Mignot Debebe		(substituted on) 15'
MF	14	Fitsum Alemu		(substituted on) 62'
MF	13	Firew Solomon		(substituted on) 62'
FW	26	Mujib Kassim		(substituted on) 82'
MF	17	Bezabeh Meleyo		(substituted on) 82'
Manager:
Wubetu Abate

GK	12	Márcio Rosa
CB	17	Steven Fortès
CB	4	Pico
CB	2	Stopira (c)
RM	22	Jeffry Fortes
CM	5	Nuno Borges
CM	18	Kenny Rocha
LM	16	Dylan Tavares
RF	11	Garry Rodrigues	(yellow card) 25'	(substituted off) 68'
CF	19	Júlio Tavares		(substituted off) 86'
LF	10	Jamiro Monteiro		(substituted off) 76'
Substitutions:
FW	25	Willy Semedo		(substituted on) 68'
MF	7	Patrick Andrade		(substituted on) 76'
FW	21	Vagner Gonçalves		(substituted on) 86'
Manager:
Bubista

Man of the Match:
Kenny Rocha (Cape Verde)

Assistant referees:
Mahmoud Ahmed Abouelregal (Egypt)
Zakaria Brinsi (Morocco)
Fourth official:
Haythem Guirat (Tunisia)
Video assistant referee:
Mahmoud Mohamed Ashour (Egypt)
Assistant video assistant referee:
Khalil Hassani (Tunisia)

=== Cameroon vs Ethiopia ===
13 January 2022
17:00

Cameroon	4–1	Ethiopia
Toko Ekambi 8', 68'; Aboubakar 53', 55'	Report	Hotessa 4'

Olembe Stadium, Yaoundé
Referee: Jean-Jacques Ndala (DR Congo)

Cameroon	Ethiopia

GK	24	André Onana	(yellow card) 88'
RB	19	Collins Fai
CB	21	Jean-Charles Castelletto
CB	5	Michael Ngadeu-Ngadjui
LB	25	Nouhou Tolo		(substituted off) 79'
RM	3	Moumi Ngamaleu		(substituted off) 69'
CM	18	Martin Hongla	(yellow card) 7'
CM	8	André-Frank Zambo Anguissa
LM	12	Karl Toko Ekambi		(substituted off) 70'
CF	13	Eric Maxim Choupo-Moting	(yellow card) 7'	(substituted off) 56'
CF	10	Vincent Aboubakar (c)		(substituted off) 79'
Substitutions:
MF	27	James Léa Siliki		(substituted on) 56'
FW	7	Clinton N'Jie		(substituted on) 69'
FW	20	Ignatius Ganago		(substituted on) 70'
FW	9	Stéphane Bahoken		(substituted on) 79'
DF	6	Ambroise Oyongo		(substituted on) 79'
Manager:
(Portugal) Toni Conceição

GK	22	Teklemariam Shanko
RB	2	Suleman Hamid
CB	15	Aschalew Tamene
CB	4	Mignot Debebe
LB	20	Ramadan Yusef		(substituted off) 73'
CM	7	Surafel Dagnachew	(yellow card) 15'	(substituted off) 46'
CM	8	Amanuel Yohannes
CM	3	Mesud Mohammed (c)		(substituted off) 72'
RF	11	Amanuel Gebremichael		(substituted off) 84'
CF	10	Abubeker Nassir
LF	27	Dawa Hotessa		(substituted off) 73'
Substitutions:
MF	13	Firew Solomon		(substituted on) 46'
MF	17	Bezabeh Meleyo		(substituted on) 72'
DF	25	Ahmed Reshid		(substituted on) 73'
FW	19	Shimeket Gugesa		(substituted on) 73'
FW	9	Getaneh Kebede		(substituted on) 84'
Manager:
Wubetu Abate

Man of the Match:
Karl Toko Ekambi (Cameroon)

Assistant referees:
Olivier Safari (DR Congo)
Gilbert Cheruiyot (Kenya)
Fourth official:
Mehdi Abid Charef (Algeria)
Video assistant referee:
Haythem Guirat (Tunisia)
Assistant video assistant referee:
Peter Waweru (Kenya)

=== Cape Verde vs Burkina Faso ===
13 January 2022
20:00

Cape Verde	0–1	Burkina Faso
	Report	Bandé 39'

Olembe Stadium, Yaoundé
Referee: Amin Omar (Egypt)

Cape Verde	Burkina Faso

GK	1	Vozinha
CB	17	Steven Fortès	(yellow card) 90+2'
CB	4	Pico
CB	2	Stopira (c)
RM	22	Jeffry Fortes		(substituted off) 82'
CM	7	Patrick Andrade		(substituted off) 73'
CM	18	Kenny Rocha
LM	16	Dylan Tavares	(yellow card) 36'	(substituted off) 69'
RF	11	Garry Rodrigues
CF	19	Júlio Tavares
LF	10	Jamiro Monteiro
Substitutions:
FW	25	Willy Semedo		(substituted on) 69'
FW	20	Ryan Mendes		(substituted on) 73'
FW	8	Lisandro Semedo		(substituted on) 82'
Manager:
Bubista

GK	16	Hervé Koffi
RB	9	Issa Kaboré
CB	14	Issoufou Dayo (c)
CB	12	Edmond Tapsoba
LB	25	Steeve Yago
CM	24	Adama Guira
CM	22	Blati Touré	(yellow card) 83'
RW	20	Gustavo Sangaré		(substituted off) 69'
AM	21	Cyrille Bayala		(substituted off) 78'
LW	19	Hassane Bandé		(substituted off) 90+1'
CF	15	Abdoul Tapsoba		(substituted off) 69'
Substitutions:
FW	17	Zakaria Sanogo		(substituted on) 69'
MF	18	Ismahila Ouédraogo		(substituted on) 69'
FW	11	Mohamed Konaté		(substituted on) 78'
MF	8	Dramane Nikièma		(substituted on) 90+1'
Manager:
Kamou Malo

Man of the Match:
Blati Touré (Burkina Faso)

Assistant referees:
Mahmoud Ahmed Abouelregal (Egypt)
Attia Amsaaed (Libya)
Fourth official:
Daniel Nii Laryea (Ghana)
Video assistant referee:
Mahmoud Mohamed Ashour (Egypt)
Assistant video assistant referee:
Mohammed Abdallah Ibrahim (Sudan)

=== Cape Verde vs Cameroon ===
17 January 2022
17:00

Cape Verde	1–1	Cameroon
Rodrigues 53'	Report	Aboubakar 39'

Olembe Stadium, Yaoundé
Referee: Sadok Selmi (Tunisia)

Cape Verde	Cameroon

GK	1	Vozinha
CB	3	Diney	(yellow card) 65'	(substituted off) 82'
CB	4	Pico
CB	2	Stopira (c)
RWB	22	Jeffry Fortes
LWB	16	Dylan Tavares
CM	25	Willy Semedo		(substituted off) 67'
CM	7	Patrick Andrade
CM	18	Kenny Rocha		(substituted off) 78'
CF	8	Lisandro Semedo		(substituted off) 46'
CF	10	Jamiro Monteiro		(substituted off) 78'
Substitutions:
FW	11	Garry Rodrigues		(substituted on) 46'
DF	24	João Paulo		(substituted on) 67'
MF	26	Nenass		(substituted on) 78'
FW	15	Willis Furtado		(substituted on) 78'
DF	17	Steven Fortès		(substituted on) 82'
Manager:
Bubista

GK	24	André Onana
RB	19	Collins Fai	(yellow card) 45+1'	(substituted off) 87'
CB	4	Harold Moukoudi
CB	5	Michael Ngadeu-Ngadjui
LB	25	Nouhou Tolo
DM	14	Samuel Gouet		(substituted off) 87'
RM	3	Moumi Ngamaleu		(substituted off) 70'
CM	15	Pierre Kunde		(substituted off) 62'
CM	8	André-Frank Zambo Anguissa	(yellow card) 81'
LM	12	Karl Toko Ekambi		(substituted off) 70'
CF	10	Vincent Aboubakar (c)
Substitutions:
MF	27	James Léa Siliki		(substituted on) 62'
FW	7	Clinton N'Jie		(substituted on) 70'
FW	13	Eric Maxim Choupo-Moting		(substituted on) 70'
MF	26	Jean Onana		(substituted on) 87'
DF	17	Olivier Mbaizo		(substituted on) 87'
Manager:
(Portugal) Toni Conceição

Man of the Match:
Pico (Cape Verde)

Assistant referees:
Khalil Hassani (Tunisia)
Mohammed Abdallah Ibrahim (Sudan)
Fourth official:
Dahane Beida (Mauritania)
Video assistant referee:
Haythem Guirat (Tunisia)
Assistant video assistant referee:
Ahmed Hossam Taha (Egypt)

=== Burkina Faso vs Ethiopia ===
17 January 2022
17:00

Burkina Faso	1–1	Ethiopia
Bayala 25'	Report	Kebede 52' (pen.)

Kouekong Stadium, Bafoussam
Referee: Ahmad Heeralall (Mauritius)

Burkina Faso	Ethiopia

GK	23	Farid Ouédraogo
RB	9	Issa Kaboré
CB	14	Issoufou Dayo
CB	12	Edmond Tapsoba
LB	25	Steeve Yago
CM	24	Adama Guira
CM	22	Blati Touré
RW	10	Bertrand Traoré (c)
AM	20	Gustavo Sangaré	(substituted off) 63'
LW	21	Cyrille Bayala	(substituted off) 63'
CF	19	Hassane Bandé	(substituted off) 76'
Substitutions:
MF	18	Ismahila Ouédraogo	(substituted on) 63'
FW	28	Dango Ouattara	(substituted on) 63'
FW	17	Zakaria Sanogo	(substituted on) 76'
Manager:
Kamou Malo

GK	22	Teklemariam Shanko
RB	21	Asrat Tunjo
CB	15	Aschalew Tamene
CB	16	Yared Bayeh
LB	20	Ramadan Yusef
CM	8	Amanuel Yohannes
CM	12	Yihun Endashew	(yellow card) 36'	(substituted off) 60'
RW	27	Dawa Hotessa		(substituted off) 60'
AM	7	Surafel Dagnachew		(substituted off) 75'
LW	10	Abubeker Nassir
CF	9	Getaneh Kebede (c)	(yellow card) 82'
Substitutions:
FW	24	Mesfin Tafesse		(substituted on) 60'
MF	17	Bezabeh Meleyo		(substituted on) 60'
FW	11	Amanuel Gebremichael		(substituted on) 75'
Manager:
Wubetu Abate

Man of the Match:
Amanuel Yohannes (Ethiopia)

Assistant referees:
Mostafa Akarkad (Morocco)
Samuel Pwadutakam (Nigeria)
Fourth official:
Bernard Camille (Seychelles)
Video assistant referee:
Mahmoud Mohamed Ashour (Egypt)
Assistant video assistant referee:
Lahlou Benbraham (Algeria)
