= 2016–17 Ethiopian Premier League =

71st season of top-tier Ethiopian football

Ethiopian Premier League
- Season: 2016–17
- Champions: Saint George SC (25th title)
- Relegated: Jimma Aba Buna F.C.; Ethiopia Nigd Bank; Addis Abeba Kenema
- CAF Champions League: Saint George SC
- Confederation Cup: Dedebit
- Top goalscorer: Getaneh Kebede (25)

The 2016–17 Ethiopian Premier League is the 71st season of top-tier football in Ethiopia as well as the 19th season of the Premier League. The season began play on 12 November 2016. Saint George SC are the defending champions, having won their 25th championship.

The top flight has been expanded to 16-teams up from 14, and is expected to be more competitive and exciting with more matches to play. The bottom three finishers will be relegated to the Ethiopian Super League for 2017-18.

== Teams ==
A total of 16 teams will contest the league, including 12 sides from the 2015–16 season and four promoted from the Ethiopian Higher League. The four newcomers are Fasil Kenema F.C.
Jimma Aba Buna F.C., Addis Ababa City F.C. and Woldia City.

Dashen Beer FC and Hadiya Hossana FC were the last two teams of the 2015–16 season and play in the Ethiopian Super League for the 2016-17 season. Saint George SC are the defending champions from the 2015–16 season.

== League table ==
Pos	Team	Pld	W	D	L	GF	GA	GD	Pts	Qualification or relegation
1	Kedus Giorgis (C)	30	18	8	4	49	20	+29	62	2018 CAF Champions League
2	Dedebit	30	13	12	5	36	22	+14	51	2018 CAF Confederation Cup
3	Adama Kenema	30	13	12	5	27	17	+10	51	
4	Sidama Bunna	30	13	10	7	30	22	+8	49	
5	Ethiopia Bunna	30	12	12	6	36	25	+11	48	
6	Fasil Kenema F.C.	30	12	7	11	32	30	+2	43	
7	Woldya Kenema	30	9	10	11	18	20	−2	37	
8	Mekelakeya	30	8	13	9	24	35	−11	37	
9	Welayta Dicha	30	9	9	12	24	30	−6	36	
10	Awassa Kenema	30	9	8	13	35	37	−2	35	
11	Dire Dawa Kenema	30	8	11	11	21	29	−8	35	
12	Arba Minch Kenema	30	6	16	8	25	32	−7	34	
13	Mebrat Hayl (EEPCO)	30	6	15	9	23	24	−1	33	
14	Jimma Aba Buna F.C. (R)	30	7	11	12	18	22	−4	32	Relegation to 2017-18 Ethiopian Higher League
15	Ethiopia Nigd Bank (R)	30	7	10	13	27	38	−11	31	Relegation to 2017-18 Ethiopian Higher League
16	Addis Abeba Kenema (R)	30	4	8	18	17	39	−22	20	Relegation to 2017-18 Ethiopian Higher League

Updated to match(es) played on 24 June 2017. Source:
Rules for classification: 1) points; 2) goal difference; 3) total goals; 4) head-to-head points; 5) head-to-head goal difference
(C) Champions; (R) Relegated
