= 2023–24 Ethiopian Premier League =

78th season of top-tier Ethiopian football

BetKing Ethiopian Premier League
- Season: 2023–24
- Dates: 1 October 2023 – 30 June 2024
- Champions: CBE
- Relegated: Hambericho Durame; Shashemene City; Wolkite City
- Champions League: CBE
- Matches: 240
- Top goalscorer: (Eritrea) Ali Sulieman (20 goals)

The 2023–24 Ethiopian Premier League (known as the BetKing Ethiopian Premier League for sponsorship reasons) was the 25th season of the Ethiopian Premier League, and the 78th season of top-division football in Ethiopia. The season started on 1 October 2023, and ended on 30 June 2024. The league consisted of 16 teams.

CBE were crowned champions for the first time, getting the title in their first attempt after gaining promotion from the 2022–23 Ethiopian Higher League.

== Clubs ==
=== Changes from previous season ===
▲ Promoted from 2022–23 Higher League	▼ Relegated to 2023–24 Higher League
Commercial Bank of Ethiopia; Hambericho Durame; Shashemene City	Arba Minch City; Legetafo Legedadi; Ethio Electric

== Events ==
On June 22, Ethiopia Coffee secured its fifth consecutive win, while the Ethiopian Gunners' seven-game winning streak ended. The Gunners made four lineup changes from their previous 2–0 win, substituting Saeed Hassan, Amir Mudesir, Mohammed Aberra, and Jerome Philippe. Ethiopia Coffee made six changes from their 4–0 victory over Wolkite City, including Willemu Alemayehu, Ramquel James, and Wasawa Jeoffrey. Ethiopia Coffee scored first with Abdulkarim finishing a pass from Asrat Tunjo and Mohammednur Nasser. In the second half, Jared Darza equalized for the Gunners after a defensive mistake. The Browns regained the lead in the 68th minute. Coach Gebremedhn Haile mentioned that his team's psychological preparation and tactical errors were issues.

In the evening, International Referee Haile Jesus kicked off the game amidst a lively atmosphere with fans and a marching band. In the 7th minute, Awesome Hagos's shot was saved by goalkeeper Ecclesiastes. The Mets scored unexpectedly in the 14th minute and added a second goal in the 46th minute from a corner kick. In the 52nd minute, Menyulu's brother struck Bola in the box, but Ecclesiastes saved it. Five minutes later, David Mamo's attempt to score was thwarted. In the 65th minute, Berhanu Bekele scored a brilliant goal from outside the box. Coach Forever Shiferawu noted that first-half control was undone by a penalty and a second-half goal. Coach Gebrechrist Birra adjusted his strategy against Sidama Coffee, playing with five defenders and showing confidence in his team's depth.

On June 20, 2024, Fasil Kenema S.C. wom 2–1 to Shashemene ending their unbeaten streak. In Week 28, Shashemenes made four changes from their previous lineup, substituting Ken Saidi, Gegemeh Desalegn, Enoch Delbi, and Winner Tiruneh in place of Abel Mamo, Mentesnot Kebede, Mulugeta Woldegiorgis, and Abdulkadir Nasser. At 9:00 p.m., the Fasil Kenema S.C first against the Eagles. Habib Mohammed, who received a yellow card, was substituted in the 37th minute to avoid a potential red card. The Eagles did not register a shot on target in the first half. In the 76th minute, the Eagles scored from a free kick to take the lead and secure the win.

On June 14, 2024, Dire Dawa City defeated St. George's 1-0 for the first time. Dire Dawa City scored the lone goal in a match of contrasting halves. Dire Dawa made four changes from their Week 26 lineup, substituting Mohammed Abdullatif, Elijah Ahmed, Temesgen Arrived, and Ame Mohammed. The Cavaliers made five changes from their previous game, bringing in Brooke Tareme, Emmanuel Said, David Tefera, and Frimpong. Dire Dawa City had a chance in the 47th minute when Emmanuel Surfu's shot was saved by goalkeeper Bahiru Negash. In the 48th minute, Shahid Mustafa scored from an Ame Mohammed cross. This marked Mustafa's second goal of the season. Despite late efforts by the Cavaliers, including shots by Emmanuel Erbo and Teshome, Dire Dawa City held on for a 1–0 victory. St. George's coach Dereje Tesfaye noted their improved performance in the second half but admitted they didn't play well overall.

== League table ==
Pos	Team	Pld	W	D	L	GF	GA	GD	Pts	Promotion or relegation
1	CBE SA (C, Q)	30	19	7	4	57	27	+30	64	Qualification for CAF Champions League first qualifying round
2	Defence Force (X)	30	19	6	5	47	27	+20	63	Qualification for Confederation Cup first qualifying round
3	Ethiopian Coffee	30	14	9	7	51	32	+19	51	
4	Bahir Dar Kenema	30	13	11	6	36	26	+10	50	
5	Saint George	30	13	9	8	43	26	+17	48	
6	Fasil City	30	11	11	8	35	30	+5	44	
7	Adama City	30	11	11	8	40	37	+3	44	
8	Hadiya Hossana	30	9	14	7	30	25	+5	41	
9	Hawassa City	30	11	8	11	42	46	−4	41	
10	Ethiopian Insurance	30	10	10	10	37	34	+3	40	
11	Sidama Coffee	30	11	7	12	30	31	−1	40	
12	Dire Dawa City	30	11	7	12	32	38	−6	40	
13	Wolaitta Dicha	30	8	10	12	25	35	−10	34	
14	Wolkite City (R)	30	5	8	17	15	41	−26	23	Relegation to Higher League
15	Shashemene City (R)	30	3	8	19	22	42	−20	17	Relegation to Higher League
16	Hambericho Durame (R)	30	1	6	23	12	57	−45	9	Relegation to Higher League

Updated to match(es) played on 5 July 2024. Source: Supersport
Rules for classification: 1) Points; 2) Head-to-head points; 3) Head-to-head goal difference; 4) Head-to-head goals scored; 5) Goal difference; 6) Goals scored.
(C) Champions; (Q) Qualified for the phase indicated; (R) Relegated; (X) Assured of at least CAF Champions League

== Results ==
Home \ Away	ADC	BDC	CBE	DDC	ETC	ETI	FSC	HAD	HAM	HWC	MEC	STG	SHC	SDC	WLD	WKC
Adama City		2–3	0–0	2–1	2–1	2–2	1–1	0–1	2–2	3–2	0–3	2–1	1–0	2–1	1–1	0–1
Bahir Dar City	1–2		1–2	1–0	3–1	0–0	0–0	0–0	0–0	2–1	2–1	1–1	1–0	0–2	0–0	2–1
Commercial Bank of Ethiopia	4–1	2–2		1–1	2–1	4–1	1–0	1–0	5–1	2–1	0–2	0–3	2–1	1–0	0–1	2–0
Dire Dawa City	1–1	1–2	2–3		0–1	0–5	0–3	1–3	1–0	1–3	1–3	1–0	1–0	0–2	1–1	1–0
Ethiopian Coffee	0–1	2–2	2–2	1–2		3–0	1–1	1–1	6–1	3–2	1–1	1–0	1–1	3–0	2–2	1–0
Ethiopian Insurance	4–1	3–2	0–2	1–2	1–2		0–2	1–0	2–0	2–2	0–1	0–3	1–1	0–1	0–1	0–0
Fasil City	0–0	0–0	2–4	1–2	2–0	1–1		1–2	2–2	2–1	0–1	0–1	2–0	2–2	0–2	1–0
Hadiya Hossana	2–1	1–0	0–0	0–0	2–1	1–1	1–2		2–0	1–2	2–3	0–0	0–0	1–2	1–1	0–0
Hamberico Durame	0–3	0–2	0–2	1–2	0–0	0–2	0–3	0–0		0–1	0–2	1–2	0–3	0–2	0–0	0–2
Hawassa City	0–5	1–1	0–3	0–0	1–2	0–0	3–3	1–1	2–0		2–3	0–3	3–1	1–1	2–0	2–2
Mechal	2–1	0–1	1–1	1–0	0–4	1–2	0–0	2–3	1–0	2–1		0–0	2–2	2–1	1–0	3–1
Saint George	2–2	1–2	1–1	0–3	1–1	0–1	4–0	1–1	3–1	1–2	1–1		3–2	1–0	1–1	4–1
Shashemene City	1–1	0–0	0–2	1–1	1–2	0–2	1–2	1–3	3–1	0–1	0–1	0–2		1–3	0–1	0–1
Sidama Coffee	0–0	2–1	2–1	0–2	0–1	0–0	0–1	0–0	0–2	0–1	1–4	0–1	1–0		2–1	0–0
Wolaitta Dicha	0–1	0–1	0–5	1–1	1–2	2–2	0–0	2–1	1–0	1–2	0–1	1–0	1–2	1–4		2–1
Wolkite City	0–0	0–3	1–2	0–3	0–4	0–3	0–1	0–0	1–0	1–2	0–2	0–2	0–0	1–1	1–0	

Updated to match(es) played on 5 July 2024. Source: SuperSport
Legend: Blue = home team win; Yellow = draw; Red = away team win.

== Attendances ==
#	Football club	Average attendance
1	Ethiopian Coffee	4,036
2	St. George	2,795
3	Dire Dawa City	870
4	Hawassa City	667
5	Sidama Coffee	590
6	Ethiopian Insurance	404
7	Wolaitta Dicha	364
8	Adama City	317
9	Hadiya Hossana	282
10	Fasil City	243
11	Shashemene City	240
12	CBE SA	234
13	Hambericho Durame	229
14	Wolkite City	170
15	Bahir Dar City	140
16	Defence Force	139
