= Abel Mamo =

Ethiopian footballer

Personal information
- Full name: Abel Mamo Gebreyohanes
- Date of birth: 9 June 1994 (age 32)
- Place of birth: Bishoftu, Ethiopia
- Height: 1.83 m (6 ft 0 in)
- Position: Goalkeeper

Team information
- Current team: Shashemene City
- Number: 44

Youth career
- Muger Cement

Senior career*
Years	Team	Apps	(Gls)
2016–2020	Defence Force		
2020–2022	Ethiopian Coffee	30	(0)
2022–2023	Arba Minch City	4	(0)
2023–	Shashemene City	5	(0)

International career^{‡}
2015–	Ethiopia	14	(0)
- * Club domestic league appearances and goals as of 8 March 2024 ‡ National team caps and goals as of 21 May 2017

Abel Mamo Gebreyohanes (Oromo: Abeel Maamoo; Amharic: አቤል ማሞ; born 9 June 1994) is an Ethiopian professional footballer who plays as a goalkeeper for Ethiopian Premier League club Shashemene City.

== International career ==
In January 2016, coach Yohannes Sahle, invited him to be a part of the Ethiopia squad for the 2014 African Nations Championship. The team was eliminated in the group stages after losing to Congo, Libya and Ghana.
