= Isaac Isinde =

Ugandan footballer (born 1991)

Personal information
- Date of birth: 16 April 1991 (age 35)
- Place of birth: Kampala, Uganda
- Height: 1.83 m (6 ft 0 in)
- Position: Centre back

Team information
- Current team: Hadiya Hossana
- Number: 5

Senior career*
Years	Team	Apps	(Gls)
2007–2008	Iganga Town Council		
2008–2009	Simba		
2009–2011	Victors		
2011–2016	Saint George	204	(10)
2017–2018	Buildcon	19	(0)
2018–2019	Busoga United	28	(0)
2019	TRAU	2	(0)
2020–	Hadiya Hossana		

International career^{‡}
2010–	Uganda	60	(2)
- * Club domestic league appearances and goals as of 19:18, 24 January 2021 (UTC) ‡ National team caps and goals as of 29 July 2017

Isaac Isinde (born 16 April 1991) is a Ugandan professional footballer who currently plays for Busoga United FC as a centre-back. He started playing football at Jinja Senior Secondary School, an Eastern Uganda Sports giant; where he was a regular fixture. He has won 4 Ethiopian Premier League titles and 2 Ethiopian FA Cups in his 5 years with Saint George.

== Career history ==
Isaac has played club football for Iganga Town Council, Simba, Victors in Uganda, Saint George in Ethiopia, Buildcon F.C in Zambia, and TRAU FC in India.

== Buildcon F.C ==
Isaac moved to Buildcon F.C after expiry of his contract with St. George of Ethiopia, a couple of days to the finals of Africa Cup of Nations where he was part of the Uganda Cranes, Isaac made his debut for Buildcon F.C against T.P Mazembe at Levy Mwanawasa stadium, Ndola, Isinde featured at right back. He made his debut in the Zambian league on 8 April 2017 against Real Nakonde F.C and the match ended in a draw of 0–0.

== International career ==
Isinde played his first international game with the senior national team on 3 March 2010 in and against Tanzania (2–3), where he played the entire match. He has now been a regular in the national team set up since 2013 and at 25 years of age already has 55 caps to his name.

=== International goals ===
Scores and results list Uganda's tally first.

No	Date	Venue	Opponent	Score	Result	Competition
1.	8 December 2011	National Stadium, Dar es Salaam, Tanzania	Tanzania	3–1	3–1 (a.e.t.)	2011 CECAFA Cup
2.	10 December 2011	National Stadium, Dar es Salaam, Tanzania	Rwanda	1–1	2–2 (3–2 pen.)	2011 CECAFA Cup

== Honours ==
Saint George

- Ethiopian Premier League: 2012, 2014, 2015, 2016

== Uganda ==
- CECAFA Cup: 2011, 2012
