= Surafel Dagnachew =

Ethiopian footballer (born 1997)

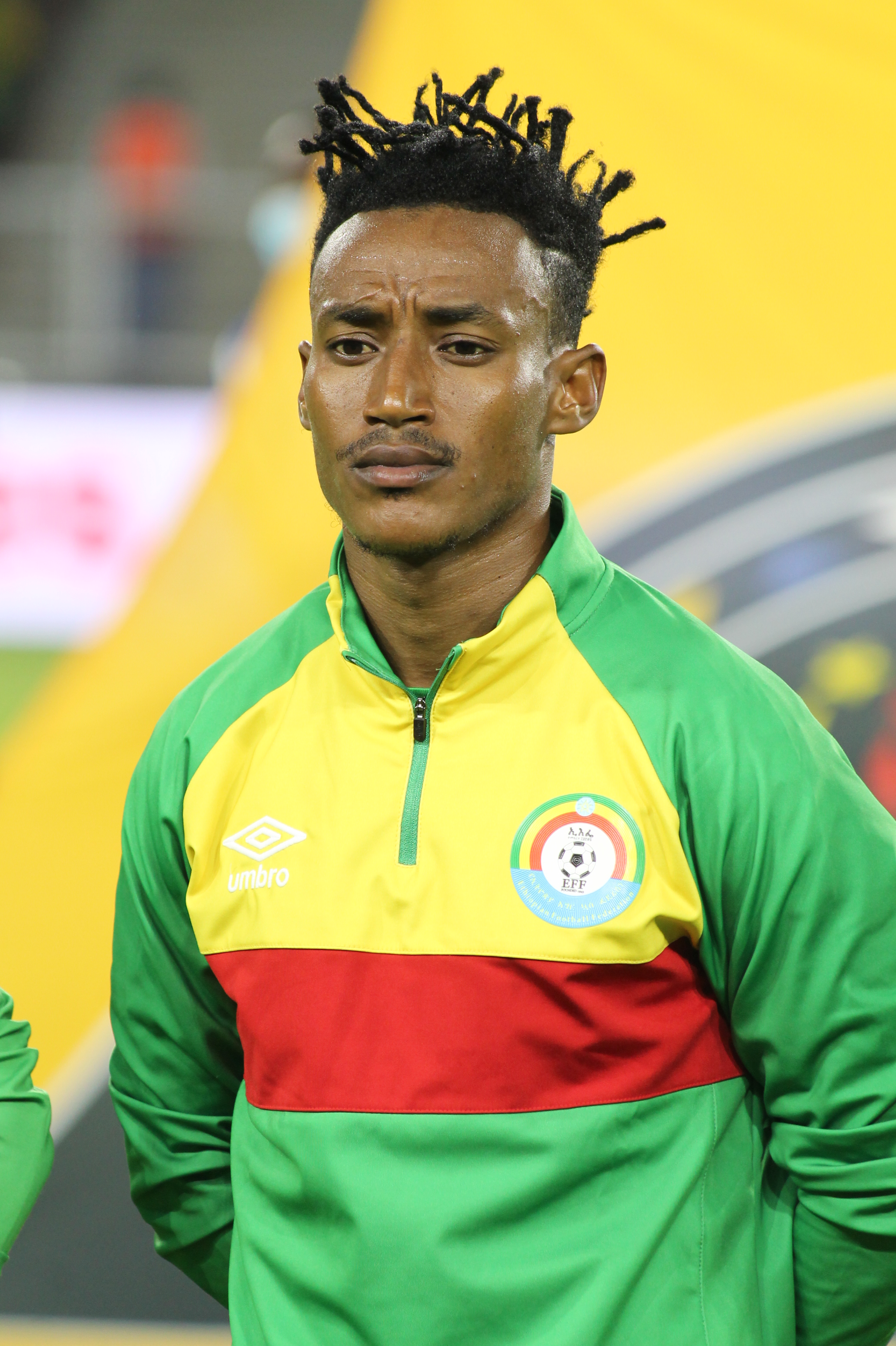
- Surafel with Ethiopia at the 2021 Africa Cup of Nations

Personal information
- Full name: Surafel Dagnachew Mengistu
- Date of birth: 11 September 1997 (age 29)
- Place of birth: Merti, Ethiopia
- Height: 1.72 m (5 ft 8 in)
- Position: Attacking midfielder

Team information
- Current team: Sidama Coffee
- Number: 19

Senior career*
Years	Team	Apps	(Gls)
2016–2018	Adama City		(2)
2018–2024	Fasil Kenema	97	(10)
2024–2025	Loudoun United	0	(0)
2026–	Sidama Coffee	0	(0)

International career^{‡}
2018	Ethiopia U20	1	(0)
2019–	Ethiopia	31	(3)
- * Club domestic league appearances and goals as of 18 February 2024 ‡ National team caps and goals as of 15 October 2024

Surafel Dagnachew Mengistu (Amharic: ሱራፌል ዳኛቸው; born 11 September 1997) is an Ethiopian professional footballer who plays as an attacking midfielder for Ethiopian Premier League club Sidama Coffee.

Debuting for Adama City in 2016, Surafel would join Fasil Kenema two years later. Scoring 10 goals in 97 appearances, he became a key player for the club. During his tenure with The Emperors, Surafel won one league title, one Ethiopian Cup title, and one Super Cup title.

== Club career ==
=== Adama City ===
==== 2016–17: Debut season ====
On 21 January 2017, Surafel scored a double in a 2–1 over Arba Minch City.

=== Fasil Kenema ===
==== 2018–19: Debut season and Player of the Year ====
On 5 August 2018, Surafel joined Fasil Kenema from Adama City.

On 11 February 2019, Surafel scored a brace in a 3–0 win over Shire Endaselassie. Then, on 21 April, Surafel scored in a 4–0 victory against Defence Force. Surafel was awarded the Ethiopian Football Federation Player of the Year award for the 2018–19 season.

==== 2020–21: First league title ====
On 20 January 2021, Surafel missed several scoring opportunities in a 4–0 win over Adama City. Surafel then won the 2020–21 Ethiopian Premier League with the club.

==== 2022–23: Contract extension ====
On 10 March 2023, Surafel was accused of insulting the referee and received a fine of 3 thousand birr.

==== 2023–24: Final season and departure ====
On 22 February 2024, Surafel confirmed on social media that he would be leaving Fasil Kenema at the end of the season.

=== Loudoun United ===
On 5 June 2024, Surafel joined Loudoun United from Fasil Kenema with a two-year contract. On 18 March 2025, Surafel made his debut for the club in the first round of the U.S. Open Cup against West Chester United, where he provided an assist for Riley Bidois in a 3–2 win.

== International career ==
Surafel made his international debut with the Ethiopia national team in a 4–3 2020 African Nations Championship qualification win against Djibouti on 4 August 2019.

On 25 December 2021, Surafel was named to Ethiopia's 25 man squad for the 2021 Africa Cup of Nations in Cameroon.

== Career statistics ==
=== International goals ===
Scores and results list Ethiopia's goal tally first.

No	Date	Venue	Opponent	Score	Result	Competition
1	19 November 2019	Bahir Dar Stadium, Bahir Dar, Ethiopia	Ivory Coast	1–1	2–1	2021 Africa Cup of Nations qualification
2	17 March 2021	Bahir Dar Stadium, Bahir Dar, Ethiopia	Malawi	3–0	4–0	Friendly
3	25 March 2022	Stade Omnisports de Malouzini, Moroni, Comoros	Comoros	2–1	2–1	Friendly

== Honours ==
Fasil Kenema

- Ethiopian Premier League: 2020–21
- Ethiopian Cup: 2019
- Ethiopian Super Cup: 2019

Individual

- Ethiopian Football Federation Player of the Year Award: 2019
