= 2013–14 Ethiopian Premier League =

68th season of top-tier Ethiopian football

Ethiopian Premier League
- Season: 2013–14
- Champions: Saint-George SA
- Relegated: Harar Bira
- Matches: 182
- Goals: 363 (1.99 per match)
- Biggest home win: Saint-George SA 5 - 1 Harar Bira
- Biggest away win: Banks SC 0 – 4 Welayta Dicha
- Highest scoring: Saint-George SA 5 – 1 Harar Bira

The 2013–14 Ethiopian Premier League is the 68th season of the Ethiopian Premier League since its establishment in 1944. A total of 14 teams are contesting the league.

== Clubs ==
- Arba Minch City F.C. (a.k.a. Arba Minch Kenema)
- Awassa City FC (a.k.a. Awassa Kenema)
- Banks SC (a.k.a. Ethiopia Nigd Bank) (Addis Abeba)
- Dashen Beer FC (Gondar)
- Dedebit (Addis Abeba)
- Defence (a.k.a. Mekelakeya) (Addis Abeba)
- EEPCO (a.k.a. Mebrat Hayl) (Addis Abeba)
- Ethiopian Coffee (a.k.a. Ethiopian Bunna) (Addis Abeba)
- Ethiopian Insurance (Addis Abeba)
- Harrar Beer Botling FC (a.k.a. Harar Bira)
- Muger Cement (a.k.a. Muger Cemento) (Oromiya)
- Saint-George SA (a.k.a. Kedus Giorgis) (Addis Abeba)
- Sidama Coffee (a.k.a. Sidama Bunna) (Awassa)
- Welayta Dicha (Sodo)

== League table ==
Pos	Team	Pld	W	D	L	GF	GA	GD	Pts	Qualification or relegation
1	Kedus Giorgis	26	22	2	2	55	14	+41	68	2014 CAF Champions League
2	Ethiopia Bunna	26	14	6	6	35	23	+12	48	2014 CAF Confederation Cup
3	Mekelakeya	26	11	9	6	28	24	+4	42	
4	Ethiopia Nigd Bank (CBA SA)	26	10	9	7	16	23	−7	39	
5	Welayta Dicha	26	8	14	4	23	17	+6	38	
6	Sidama Bunna	26	10	8	8	23	24	−1	38	
7	Arba Minch Ketema	26	8	11	7	19	19	0	35	
8	Awassa Kenema	26	8	8	10	24	28	−4	32	
9	Dedebit	26	8	7	11	37	31	+6	31	
10	Muger Cement	26	8	7	11	23	29	−6	31	
11	Dashen Beer FC	26	6	12	8	11	14	−3	30	
12	Mebrat Hayl (EEPCO)	26	7	4	15	26	42	−16	25	
13	Harar Bira	26	4	7	15	16	38	−22	19	Relegation to Ethiopian Second Division
14	Ethiopian Insurance	26	2	8	16	16	35	−19	14	Relegation to Ethiopian Second Division

Updated to match(es) played on 25 June 2014. Source: Soccerway
Rules for classification: 1) points; 2) goal difference; 3) number of goals scored.
