= Behailu =

Behailu can be both a masculine given name and a surname. Notable people with the name include:

- Behailu Assefa (born 1989), Ethiopian football midfielder
- Behailu Demeke (born 1984), Ethiopian football midfielder
- Behailu Kebede, survivor of the 2017 Grenfell Tower fire in London, UK
- Mikaya Behailu, Ethiopian singer
