= List of Ethiopian Coffee S.C. players =

These are Ethiopian Coffee Sport Club players, a professional football club based in Addis Ababa, Ethiopia.

List of former players

Name	Nationality	Position	Ethiopian Coffee Career
Abikoye Shakiru	(Benin)		
Epherem Ashamo	(Ethiopia)	FW	2012-2015
Gatoch Panom	(Ethiopia)	MF	2012-2017
Jemal Tassew	(Ethiopia)	GK	2012-2013, 2014-2017

- (Kenya) Thomas Biketi
- (Cameroon) William Yabeun
- (Ethiopia) Aschalew Girma
- (Ethiopia) Aseged Tesfaye
- (Ethiopia) Dawit Estifanos
- (Ethiopia) Binyam Assefa
- (Ethiopia) Abdulkerim Mohammed
- (Ethiopia) Million Begashaw
- (Ethiopia) Mengistu Bogale
- (Ethiopia) Mulugeta Woldeyes
- (Ethiopia) Ketema Birru
- (Ethiopia) Ashenafi Begashaw
- (Ethiopia) Asrat Adugna
- (Ethiopia) Teshome Tefera
- (Ethiopia) Tsegaye Fantahun
- (Ethiopia) Tilahun Mengesha
- (Ethiopia) Solomon Yoannes
- (Ethiopia) Nigussie W/Amanuel
- (Ethiopia) Ali Redi
- (Ethiopia) Abduselah (Fetushe)
- (Ethiopia) Paulos Getachew (Mango)
- (Ethiopia) Ashenafi Girma
- (Ethiopia) Yordanos Abay
- (Ethiopia) Sisay Demissie
- (Ethiopia) Tafesse Tesfaye
- (Ethiopia) Mesud Mohammed
- (Ethiopia) Wosenu Maze
- (Ethiopia) Edilu Dereje
- (Ethiopia) Dawit Fekadu
- (Ethiopia) Tesfaye bekele
- (Ethiopia) Aschalew Girma
- (Ethiopia) Touk James (GK)
- (Ethiopia) Fasika Asefaw (GK)
- (Ethiopia) Yordanos Abay
