= 2015–16 Ethiopian Premier League =

70th season of top-tier Ethiopian football

Ethiopian Premier League
- Season: 2015–16
- Champions: Kedus Giorgis
- Relegated: Dashen Beer FC; Hadiya Hossana FC
- CAF Champions League: Kedus Giorgis
- Confederation Cup: Ethiopia Bunna

The 2015-16 Ethiopian Premier League is the 70th season of top-tier football in Ethiopia. The season began on 28 October 2015. Saint George SC were the defending champions, having won their 24th championship.

== Teams ==
A total of 14 teams contested the league, including 12 sides from the 2014–15 season and two promoted from the National League. The two newcomers were Dire Dawa City and Hadiya Hossana FC. The teams finishing in the bottom two places were relegated to the National League for 2015-16.

Muger Cement and Woldia City were the last two teams of the 2014–15 season and play in the National League for the 2015-16 season. Saint George SC are the defending champions from the 2014–15 season.

== League table ==
Pos	Team	Pld	W	D	L	GF	GA	GD	Pts	Qualification or relegation
1	Saint George (C, Q)	26	16	7	3	37	12	+25	55	2017 CAF Champions League
2	Ethiopia Coffee (Q)	26	13	6	7	28	21	+7	45	2017 CAF Confederation Cup
3	Adama City	26	13	5	8	31	21	+10	44	
4	Dedebit	26	11	6	9	37	33	+4	39	
5	Sidama Coffee	26	8	12	6	25	23	+2	36	
6	Ethiopia Nigd Bank	26	7	14	5	19	14	+5	35	
7	Awassa Kenema	26	9	8	9	32	35	−3	35	
8	Welayta Dicha	26	8	11	7	18	21	−3	35	
9	Arba Minch Kenema	26	7	12	7	25	20	+5	33	
10	Mekelakeya	26	7	12	7	22	20	+2	33	
11	Dire Dawa Kenema	26	8	6	12	22	31	−9	30	
12	Mebrat Hayl (EEPCO)	26	8	6	12	23	34	−11	30	
13	Dashen Birra (R)	26	6	10	10	22	28	−6	28	Relegation to 2015-16 National League
14	Hossana Kenema (R)	26	1	5	20	22	50	−28	8	Relegation to 2015-16 National League

Source: RSSSF
Rules for classification: 1) points; 2) goal difference; 3) total goals; 4) head-to-head points; 5) head-to-head goal difference
(C) Champions; (Q) Qualified for the phase indicated; (R) Relegated
