= Ethiopian Super Cup =

Ethiopian football competition

The Ethiopian Super Cup (Amharic: የኢትዮጵያ አሸናፊዎች አሸናፊ ዋንጫ) is a match competition in Ethiopian football, played between the Ethiopian Premier League champions and the Ethiopian Cup winners.

== Finals ==
- 1985 : Brewery (Addis Abeba)
- 1986 : Brewery (Addis Abeba)
- 1987 : Brewery (Addis Abeba)
- 1988 : Bunna Gebeya (Addis Abeba)
- 1989 : no competition
- 1990 : Brewery (Addis Abeba)
- 1991 : no competition
- 1992 : no competition
- 1993 : Mebrat Hail (Addis Abeba)
- 1994 : Saint-George SA (Addis Abeba)
- 1995 : Saint-George SA (Addis Abeba)
- 1996 : Saint-George SA (Addis Abeba)
- 1997 : Ethiopian Bunna (Addis Abeba)
- 1998 : Mebrat Hail (Addis Abeba)
- 1999 : no competition (St. George won double)
- 2000 : Ethiopian Bunna (Addis Abeba) 1-1 2-1 Saint-George SA (Addis Abeba)
- 2001 : Mebrat Hail (Addis Abeba) 4-1 1-2 Saint-George SA (Addis Abeba)
- 2002 : Saint-George SA (Addis Abeba) 2-1 1-0 Medhin (Addis Abeba)
- 2003 : Saint-George SA (Addis Abeba) 1-0 5-0 Ethiopian Bunna (Addis Abeba)
- 2004 : Bankoch (Addis Abeba) 2-1 agg Awassa Kenema (Awassa)
- 2005 : Saint-George SA (Addis Abeba) 2-0 2-0 Awassa Kenema (Awassa)
- 2006 : Saint-George SA (Addis Abeba) 0-0 6-0 Mekelakeya (Addis Abeba)
- 2008 : Ethiopian Bunna (Addis Abeba) 2-1 awd Saint-George SA (Addis Abeba)
- 2009 : Saint-George SA (Addis Abeba) 3-2 Dedebit (Addis Abeba)
- 2010 : Ethiopian Bunna (Addis Abeba) 2-1 0-0 Saint-George SA (Addis Abeba)
- 2011 : unknown
- 2012 : unknown
- 2013 : unknown
- 2014 : unknown
- 2015 : Saint-George SA 1-1 (5-4 pen.) Mekelakeya (Addis Abeba)
- 2016 : unknown
- 2017 : Saint-George SA 2-0 Welayta Dicha (Sodo)
- 2018 : Mekelakeya (Addis Abeba) 1-1 (4-2 pen.) Jimma (Jimma)
- 2019 : Fasil Kenema (Gonder) 1-0 Mekelle 70 Enderta (Mekelle)
