= 2014–15 Ethiopian Premier League =

69th season of top-tier Ethiopian football

Ethiopian Premier League
- Season: 2014–15
- Champions: Kedus Giorgis
- Relegated: Muger Cemento; Woldya Kenema
- CAF Champions League: Kedus Giorgis
- Confederation Cup: Dedebit
- Matches: 182
- Goals: 385 (2.12 per match)
- Biggest home win: Mebrat Hayl (EEPCO) 6-0 Awassa Kenema (27 May 2015)
- Biggest away win: Mebrat Hayl (EEPCO) 0-4 Dedebit (14 May 2015)
- Highest scoring: Dedebit 6-1 Woldya Kenema (26 October 2014); Ethiopia Bunna 5-2 Woldya Kenema (24 January 2015)
- Longest winning run: Kedus Giorgis (6)
- Longest unbeaten run: Kedus Giorgis (11)
- Longest winless run: Woldya Kenema (9)
- Longest losing run: Woldya Kenema (7)

The 2014–15 Ethiopian Premier League is the 69th season of top-tier football in Ethiopia. The season began play on 25 October 2014. Saint George SC are the defending champions, having won their 23rd championship.

The league comprises 14 teams, the bottom two of which will be relegated to the National League for 2015–16.

== Teams ==
A total of 14 teams will contest the league, including 12 sides from the 2013–14 season and two promoted from the National League. The two newcomers are Welayta Dicha and Dashen Beer FC.

Weha Serawoch and Adama City F.C. were the last two teams of the 2013–14 season and play in the National League for the 2014–15 season. Saint George SC are the defending champions from the 2013–14 season.

== League table ==
Pos	Team	Pld	W	D	L	GF	GA	GD	Pts	Qualification or relegation
1	Kedus Giorgis (C, Q)	26	17	6	3	38	14	+24	57	2016 CAF Champions League
2	Dedebit (Q)	26	13	5	8	43	25	+18	44	2016 CAF Confederation Cup
3	Adama Kenema	26	10	12	4	32	24	+8	42	
4	Sidama Bunna	26	11	7	8	28	27	+1	40	
5	Ethiopia Nigd Bank	26	9	12	5	38	30	+8	39	
6	Ethiopia Bunna	26	10	6	10	30	28	+2	36	
7	Arba Minch Kenema	26	9	8	9	18	24	−6	35	
8	Mekelakeya	26	9	7	10	21	21	0	34	
9	Awassa Kenema	26	9	6	11	29	34	−5	33	
10	Welayta Dicha	26	9	6	11	20	24	−4	33	
11	Mebrat Hayl (EEPCO)	26	8	6	12	27	32	−5	30	
12	Dashen Birra	26	8	6	12	23	29	−6	30	
13	Muger Cemento (R)	26	6	9	11	20	26	−6	27	Relegation to 2015-16 National League
14	Woldya Kenema (R)	26	4	4	18	18	47	−29	16	Relegation to 2015-16 National League

Source: RSSSF
Rules for classification: 1) points; 2) goal difference; 3) total goals; 4) head-to-head points; 5) head-to-head goal difference
(C) Champions; (Q) Qualified for the phase indicated; (R) Relegated
