= Ahmed Reshid =

Ethiopian footballer

Personal information
- Full name: Ahmed Reshid Habibu
- Date of birth: 11 December 1998 (age 27)
- Place of birth: Addis Ababa, Ethiopia
- Height: 1.72 m (5 ft 8 in)
- Position: Left-back

Team information
- Current team: Defence Force
- Number: 13

Senior career*
Years	Team	Apps	(Gls)
2015–2017	Ethiopian Coffee		
2017–2018	Dire Dawa City		
2018–2020	Ethiopian Coffee	16	(0)
2020–2022	Bahir Dar Kenema	43	(1)
2022–	Defence Force	13	(0)

International career^{‡}
2016–	Ethiopia	12	(0)
- * Club domestic league appearances and goals as of 18:55, 4 June 2023 (UTC) ‡ National team caps and goals as of 18:55, 3 March 2021 (UTC)

Ahmed Reshid Habibu (born 11 December 1998) is an Ethiopian professional footballer who plays as a left-back for Ethiopian Premier League club Defence Force and the Ethiopia national team.
