= 2018 Ethiopian Cup =

Tournament details
- Country: Ethiopia

Final positions
- Champions: Defence Force

The 2018 Ethiopian Cup is the 59th edition of the Ethiopian Cup, the knockout football competition of Ethiopia.

In the final on 29 September 2018, Defence Force (Mekelakeya) defeated St. George.

== See also ==
- 2017–18 Ethiopian Premier League
