= Firew Solomon =

Ethiopian footballer (born 1992)

Personal information
- Full name: Firew Solomon Ayele
- Date of birth: 18 September 1992 (age 34)
- Place of birth: Hawassa, Ethiopia
- Height: 1.66 m (5 ft 5 in)
- Position: Winger

Team information
- Current team: Sidama Coffee

Senior career*
Years	Team	Apps	(Gls)
2014–2016	Defence Force		
2016–2018	Hawassa City		
2018–2020	Defence Force		
2020–2021	Wolkite City		
2021–	Sidama Coffee		

International career^{‡}
2015–	Ethiopia	10	(0)
- * Club domestic league appearances and goals as of 21:47, 23 December 2021 (UTC) ‡ National team caps and goals as of 09:08, 13 February 2023 (UTC)

Firew Solomon Ayele (Amharic: ፍሬው ሰለሞን; born 18 September 1992) is an Ethiopian professional footballer who plays as a winger for Ethiopian Premier League club Sidama Coffee and the Ethiopia national team.

== Club career ==
Solomon began his career with the Ethiopian club Defence Force, and helped them win the 2015 Ethiopian Cup. On 2 August 2016, he transferred to Hawassa City. In 2018, he returned to Defence Force. He had a maligned stint Wolkite City in the 2020–21 season, where he left after accusations of drinking and harassing teammates. In 2021, he moved to Sidama Coffee.

== International career ==
Solomon made his international debut with the Ethiopia national team in a 1–0 friendly loss to Zambia on 7 June 2015. He was part of the Ethiopia squad at the 2021 Africa Cup of Nations.

== Personal life ==
Solomon is known by the nickname Taquru ("the strong" Amharic: ጣቁሩ) in Ethiopia. He is a Christian.

== Honours ==
Defense Force

- Ethiopian Cup: 2015
