= Bezabeh Meleyo =

Ethiopian footballer

Personal information
- Full name: Bezabeh Meleyo Mekengo
- Date of birth: 26 June 1995 (age 31)
- Place of birth: Hosaena, Ethiopia
- Height: 1.87 m (6 ft 2 in)
- Position: Attacking midfielder

Team information
- Current team: Sidama Coffee
- Number: 9

Senior career*
Years	Team	Apps	(Gls)
2015–2019	Wolaitta Dicha		
2019–2023	Fasil Kenema	69	(12)
2023–	Sidama Coffee	17	(2)

International career^{‡}
2021–	Ethiopia	10	(1)
- * Club domestic league appearances and goals as of 21:47, 17 March 2024 (UTC) ‡ National team caps and goals as of 21:47, 26 September 2022 (UTC)

Bezabeh Meleyo Mekengo (Amharic: በዛብህ መላዮ; born 26 June 1995) is an Ethiopian professional footballer who plays as an attacking midfielder for Ethiopian Premier League club Sidama Coffee and the Ethiopia national team.

== Club career ==
=== Wolaitta Dicha ===
Meleyo began his professional career with Wolaitta Dicha and made his debut in the 2015–16 Ethiopian Premier League season. In 2017, he won the Ethiopian Cup with the club.

=== Fasil Kenema ===
On 1 July 2019, Meleyo signed with Fasil Kenema. He won the 2020–21 Ethiopian Premier League with the club.

== International career ==
Meleyo made his international debut with the Ethiopia national team in a 0–0 friendly tie with Sierra Leone on 26 August 2021.

== Honours ==
Wolaitta Dicha

- Ethiopian Cup: 2017

Fasil Kenema

- Ethiopian Premier League: 2020–21
