= 2017–18 Ethiopian Higher League =

The 2017–18 Ethiopian Higher League is the second-tier football in Ethiopia. The season began play on 18 November 2017.

On September 4, 2018 Debub Police (winner of Group B) beat Bahir Dar Kenema (winner of Group A) 1-0 in the championship match and were crowned champions of the 2017–18 Ethiopian Higher League.

A playoff match was held in Hawassa, Ethiopia between Shire Endaselassie and Jimma Aba Buna to decide the third and final team promoted to the 2018–19 Ethiopian Premier League, a match Shire Endaselassie won by a final score of 2-1.

== League table ==
=== 2017-18 Ethiopian Higher League Group A (2010 ከፍተኛ ሊግ ምድብ ሀ) ===
Pos	Team	Pld	W	D	L	GF	GA	GD	Pts	Promotion or relegation
1	Bahir Dar Kenema	30	19	8	3	53	21	+32	65	2018–19 Ethiopian Premier League
2	Shire Endaselassie	30	15	9	6	35	18	+17	54	Playoff against runner-up in Group B
3	Legetafo Legedadi	30	11	14	5	29	18	+11	47	
4	Sebeta City	30	12	11	7	30	26	+4	47	
5	Addis Ababa City	30	11	12	7	32	26	+6	45	
6	Ecosco	30	11	9	10	28	24	+4	42	
7	Amhara Weha Sera	30	10	12	8	29	28	+1	42	
8	Aksum City	30	9	11	10	27	26	+1	38	
9	Nekemte City	30	9	10	11	26	26	0	37	
10	Burayu City	30	9	10	11	27	29	−2	37	
11	Ethiopia Medin	30	6	16	8	27	32	−5	34	
12	Yeka Sub City	30	8	10	12	20	34	−14	34	
13	Dessie City	30	6	13	11	25	34	−9	31	
14	Wollo Kombolcha	30	7	9	14	19	26	−7	30	Relegation to 2018-19 Ethiopian first League (Third Tier)
15	Federal Police	30	7	8	15	24	38	−14	29	Relegation to 2018-19 Ethiopian first League (Third Tier)
16	Sululta City	30	6	6	18	21	46	−25	24	Relegation to 2018-19 Ethiopian first League (Third Tier)

Updated to match(es) played on 6 August 2018. Source:
Rules for classification: 1) points; 2) goal difference; 3) total goals; 4) head-to-head points; 5) head-to-head goal difference

=== 2017-18 Ethiopian Higher League Group B (2010 ከፍተኛ ሊግ ምድብ ለ) ===
Pos	Team	Pld	W	D	L	GF	GA	GD	Pts	Promotion or relegation
1	Debub Police (P)	30	18	7	5	59	23	+36	61	2018–19 Ethiopian Premier League
2	Jimma Aba Buna (A)	30	17	8	5	56	24	+32	59	Playoff against runner-up in Group A
3	Halaba City	30	16	11	3	39	14	+25	59	
4	Dilla City	29	13	12	4	28	18	+10	51	
5	Sil'te Werabe	29	13	6	10	35	34	+1	45	
6	Kaffa Buna	29	13	6	10	29	30	−1	45	
7	Hamberecho Durame	30	12	7	11	25	25	0	43	
8	Hadiya Hossana	30	11	8	11	27	28	−1	41	
9	Wolkite City	29	10	10	9	41	33	+8	40	
10	Butajira City	29	7	10	12	26	31	−5	31	
11	Bench Maje Bunna	28	9	4	15	25	35	−10	31	
12	National Cement	28	8	7	13	28	48	−20	31	
13	Negele City	29	6	11	12	21	35	−14	29	
14	Dire Dawa Police	29	7	6	16	28	43	−15	27	Relegation to 2018-19 Ethiopian First League (Third Tier)
15	Shashemane City (R)	29	5	10	14	23	43	−20	25	Relegation to 2018-19 Ethiopian First League (Third Tier)
16	Meki City (R)	30	4	7	19	24	50	−26	19	Relegation to 2018-19 Ethiopian First League (Third Tier)

Updated to match(es) played on 6 August 2018. Source:
Rules for classification: 1) points; 2) goal difference; 3) total goals; 4) head-to-head points; 5) head-to-head goal difference
(A) Advance to a further round; (P) Promoted; (R) Relegated
