= Teklemariam Shanko =

Ethiopian footballer

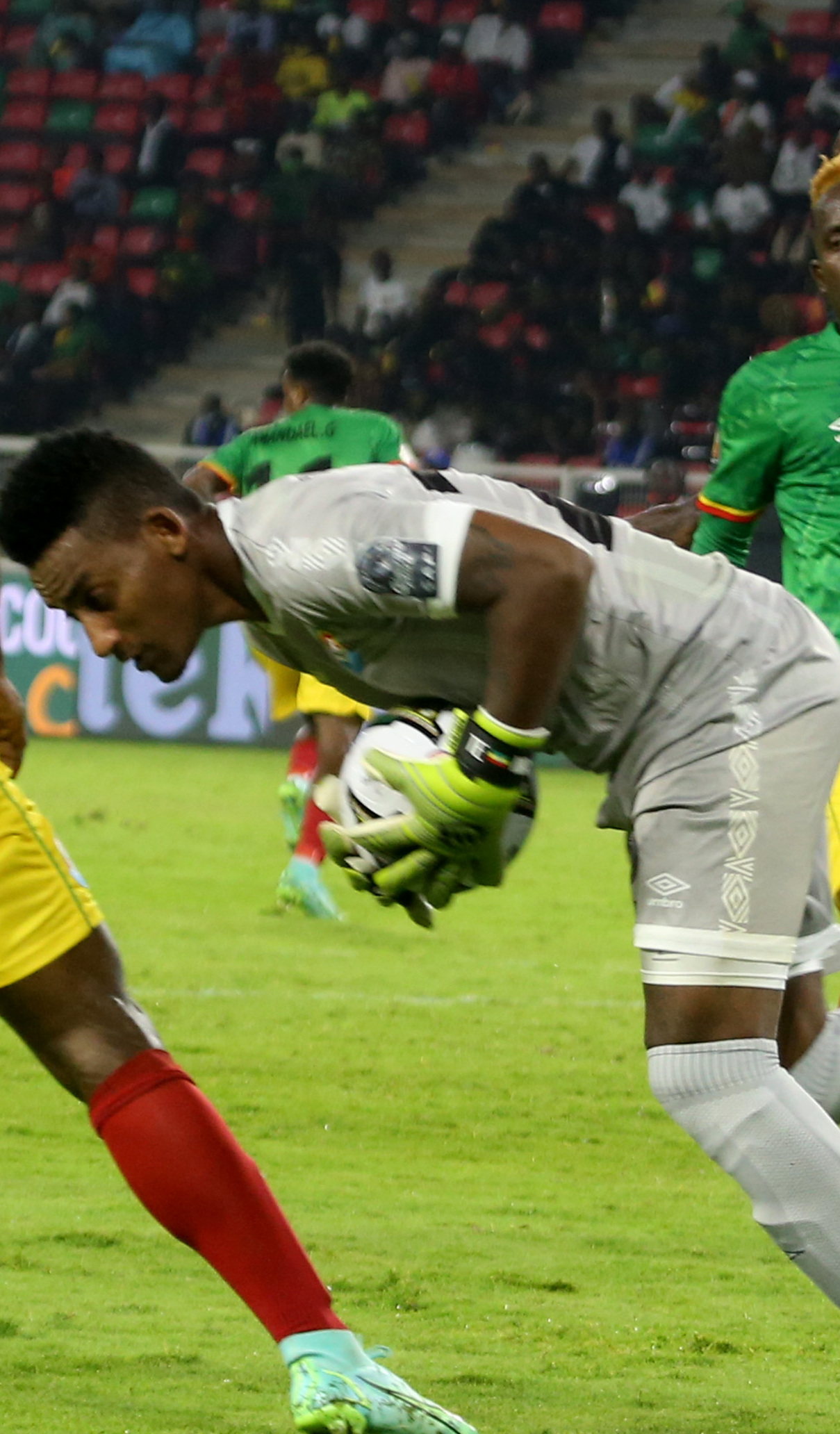
- Shanko with Ethiopia at the 2021 Africa Cup of Nations

Personal information
- Full name: Teklemariam Shanko Balcha
- Date of birth: 2 January 1998 (age 28)
- Place of birth: Batu, Ethiopia
- Height: 1.78 m (5 ft 10 in)
- Position: Goalkeeper

Team information
- Current team: Ethiopian Insurance
- Number: 16

Senior career*
Years	Team	Apps	(Gls)
2015–2017	Addis Ababa City		
2017–2019	Hawassa City		
2019–2021	Ethiopian Coffee	24	(0)
2021–2022	Sidama Coffee	24	(0)
2022–2023	Defence Force	4	(0)
2023–2024	Adama City	3	(0)
2024–	Ethiopian Insurance	2	(0)

International career^{‡}
2016	Ethiopia U20		
2017–	Ethiopia	9	(0)
- * Club domestic league appearances and goals as of 11 May 2023 ‡ National team caps and goals as of 30 March 2021

Teklemariam Shanko Balcha (Amharic: ተክለማርያም ሻንቆ; born 2 January 1998) is an Ethiopian professional footballer who plays as a goalkeeper for Ethiopian Premier League club Ethiopian Insurance and the Ethiopia national team.

== International career ==
In 2016, Shanko played for the Ethiopia national under-20 team during their participation in the 2017 Africa U-20 Cup of Nations qualification. He has been named to the senior national team for 2021 AFCON qualifiers.
