= Daniel Deribe =

Ethiopian footballer

Personal information
- Full name: Daniel Deribe
- Date of birth: 25 March 1983 (age 43)
- Place of birth: Awasa, Ethiopia
- Position: Right-back

Team information
- Current team: Hawassa City
- Number: 10

Senior career*
Years	Team	Apps	(Gls)
2013–	Hawassa City S.C.		
2011–2013	Ethiopian Coffee F.C.		
2009–2011	Dedebit F.C.		

International career
2013–	Ethiopia	5	(0)
- * Club domestic league appearances and goals

Daniel Deribe Gebremichael (Amharic: ዳንኤል ደርቤ), born 25 March 1983, is an Ethiopian professional footballer who plays as a right-back for Ethiopian Premier League club Hawassa City.

== International career ==
He plays for the Ethiopia national football team. He plays either right back or right wing.
