= Ephrem Ashamo =

Ethiopian professional footballer

Personal information
- Full name: Ephrem Ashamo
- Date of birth: 11 September 1991 (age 35)
- Place of birth: Hawassa, Ethiopia
- Height: 1.66 m (5 ft 5 in)
- Position: Forward

Team information
- Current team: Hawassa City
- Number: 21

Senior career*
Years	Team	Apps	(Gls)
2012-2015	Ethiopian Coffee FC		
2015-2018	Dedebit F.C.		
2018-2019	Welwalo Adigrat University FC		
2019—2020	Mekelle 70 Enderta FC		
2020-	Hawassa City		

International career
2014–	Ethiopia		
- * Club domestic league appearances and goals

Ephrem Ashamo (Amharic: ኤፍሬም አሻሞ ) is an Ethiopian professional footballer who plays as a forward for Ethiopian Premier League club Hawassa City. He has served the national team since 2014. He has older brother (Getahun) and a younger brother (Birhanu) who also professional footballers.

== Club career ==
Ashamo started his playing career with Muger Cement and continued his progression as he moved to other clubs like Harar Beer (Harar City) and Nigd Bank.

== International career ==
In January 2014, coach Sewnet Bishaw, invited him to be a part of the Ethiopia squad for the 2014 African Nations Championship. The team was eliminated in the group stages after losing to Congo, Libya and Ghana.
