= Lawrence Lartey =

Ghanaian footballer (born 1994)

Personal information
- Full name: Lawrence Lartey
- Date of birth: 23 March 1994 (age 32)
- Place of birth: Ghana
- Height: 1.82 m (6 ft 0 in)
- Position: Defender

Team information
- Current team: Hawassa Kenema
- Number: 26

Senior career*
Years	Team	Apps	(Gls)
2008–2011	Nania	?	(?)
2011–2015	AshantiGold	?	(?)
2015–2017	Ajax Cape Town	13	(0)
2017	Club Africain	?	(?)
2017–	Hawassa Kenema	?	(?)

International career^{‡}
2013	Ghana U-20		
2015–	Ghana	3	(0)
- * Club domestic league appearances and goals as of 16 May 2016 ‡ National team caps and goals as of 16 May 2016

Lawrence Lartey (born 23 March 1994) is a Ghanaian footballer who plays as a defender for Hawassa Kenema and the Ghana national team.

== Club career ==
=== Nania FC ===
Lartey began his football career with F.C. Nania from Legon, Greater Accra Region. He helped the club to win the reintroduced Ghanaian FA Cup by defeating Asante Kotoko, while also winning the Ghana Super Cup by defeating Berekum Chelsea in 2011. After three seasons he transferred to AshantiGold from Obuasi.

=== AshantiGold ===
He spent four seasons with AshGold, helping the team secure their fourth Ghanaian Premier League title in his final year with the club before relocating to South Africa and signing with Ajax Cape Town.

=== Ajax Cape Town ===
On 16 November 2015 it was announced that Lartey had signed with South African Premier Soccer League side Ajax Cape Town. He made 13 appearances in his first season with the club under manager Roger De Sá.

=== Club Africain ===
Tunisian side Club Africain announced the signing of Lartey on July 11, 2017, with Lartey becoming the 2nd Ghanaian to sign with the club after Seidu Salifu. He signed a 3-year contract as a free agent following the expiration of his contract with Ajax CT.

=== Hawassa City ===
Lartey signed a one-year contract with two time Ethiopian Premier League champions Hawassa City S.C. at the start of the 2017-18 season. In August 2018 the club announced they had come to an agreement with Lartey on a one-year extension.

== International career ==
=== Ghana Youth teams ===
Lartey plays for the Ghana national U20 team. He has captained Ghana at both the 2013 Africa U-20 Cup of Nations, where his team finished as runners-up to Egypt U20, losing the final 5–6 on penalties, as well as the 2013 FIFA U-20 World Cup where he captained Ghana to a third-place finish in Turkey. In 2014, he received his first call-up for the under-23 national team.

=== Ghana Senior team ===
On 1 September 2015, Lartey made his debut for the senior team of Ghana, playing the full 90-minutes in a friendly match against the Congo which ended in a 3–2 away win in Brazzaville.

== Honours ==
Nania

- Ghanaian FA Cup: 2011
- Ghana Super Cup: 2011

AshantiGold

- Ghanaian Premier League (1): 2014–15

Ghana U20

- FIFA U-20 World Cup Third place: 2013
- Africa U-20 Cup of Nations Runners-up: 2013
