= Amanuel Yohannes =

Ethiopian footballer (born 2007)

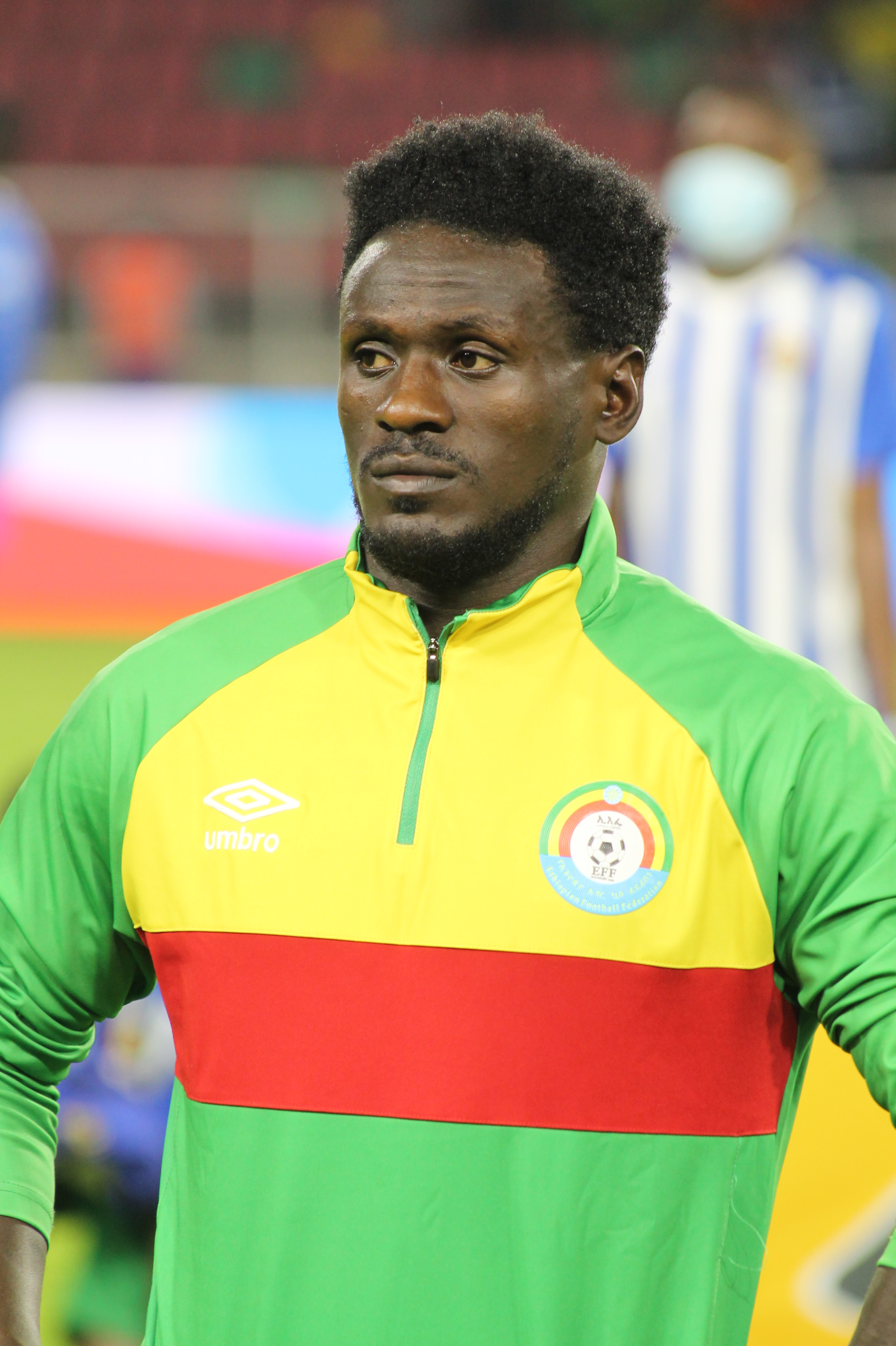
- Yohannes with Ethiopia at the 2021 Africa Cup of Nations

Personal information
- Full name: Amanuel Yohannes Gamo
- Date of birth: 14 March 1999 (age 27)
- Place of birth: Addis Ababa, Ethiopia
- Height: 1.72 m (5 ft 8 in)
- Position: Midfielder

Team information
- Current team: Defence Force
- Number: 8

Senior career*
Years	Team	Apps	(Gls)
2015–2024	Ethiopian Coffee	152	(13)
2024–	Defence Force	18	(0)

International career^{‡}
2018–	Ethiopia	38	(1)
- * Club domestic league appearances and goals as of 21:47, 2 March 2025 (UTC) ‡ National team caps and goals as of 21:47, 19 November 2024 (UTC)

Amanuel Yohannes Gamo (Amharic: አማኑኤል ዮሃንስ ጋሞ; born 14 March 1999) is an Ethiopian professional footballer who plays as a midfielder for Ethiopian Premier League club Defence Force and the Ethiopia national team.

== Club career ==
=== Ethiopian Coffee ===
Yohannes made his debut for Ethiopian Coffee in the 2015–16 Ethiopian Premier League season.

=== Defence Force ===
On 1 September 2024, Yohannes would join arch rivals Defence Force.

== International career ==
=== 2018–2021: Beginnings and first Africa Cup of Nations ===
Yohannes made his international debut with the Ethiopia national team in a 1–1 friendly tie with Burundi on 2 September 2018.

On 25 December 2021, Yohannes was named to Ethiopia's 25 man squad for the 2021 Africa Cup of Nations. He would start in the first match of Group A in a 1–0 loss to Cape Verde. Yohannes was also featured in the 4–1 loss against the host nation Cameroon. Yohannes played in the final group match against Burkina Faso, ending in a 1–1 draw. He also won the man of the match award for his performance.

=== 2024–present: First goal ===
Yohannes scored his first goal for Ethiopia in a 1–2 friendly loss against Lesotho on 21 March 2024.

== Style of play ==
Yohannes is constant threat with his eye for a defense-splitting pass but remains energetic and disciplined with tracking back to help the defenders when the team is under attack.
