= Guna Trading F.C. =

Association football club in Ethiopia

Guna Trading
- Full name: Guna Trading Football Club
- Ground: Tigray Stadium; Tigray, Ethiopia
- Capacity: 10,000
- League: Ethiopian Premier League
Home colours	Away colours

Guna Trading FC is an Ethiopian football club based in Tigray. They are a member of the Ethiopian Football Federation national league. Their home stadium is Tigray Stadium.

== Performance in CAF competitions ==
- CAF Cup Winners' Cup: 1 appearance

2002 – Preliminary Round
