= Behailu Demeke =

Ethiopian footballer (born 1984)

Personal information
- Date of birth: 31 October 1984 (age 42)
- Place of birth: Ethiopia
- Position: Midfielder

Senior career*
Years	Team	Apps	(Gls)
–2005	Awassa City		
2005–2006	St. George		
2006–2007	Hawassa City		
2007–2010	Ethiopian Coffee		
2010–2013	FSG Kirtorf		
2014	SV Müs	20	(4)
2015–2017	FSG Homberg/Ober-Ofleiden	48	(14)
2016–2017	→ FSG Homberg/Ober-Ofleiden II (loan)	4	(9)
2017–2020	FSG Kirtorf	45	(36)
2020–2022	SpVgg Leusel	4	(0)

International career
2005–2010	Ethiopia	12	(3)
- * Club domestic league appearances and goals

Behailu Demeke Teshome (born 31 October 1984) is an Ethiopian former footballer who played as a midfielder.

== Career ==
Demeke started his career with Ethiopian side Awassa City, helping them win their first league title. Before the second half of 2013–14, he signed for SV Müs in the German eighth tier. Before the second half of 2014–15, Demeke signed for German seventh tier club FSG Homberg/Ober-Ofleiden.

In 2017, he returned to FSG Kirtorf in the German tenth tier, helping them earn promotion to the German ninth tier. In 2020, he signed for German eighth tier team Spvgg Leusel.
