= Gebremedhin Haile =

Ethiopian football coach

Personal information
- Full name: Gebremedhin Haile Bitew
- Place of birth: Ethiopia
- Position: Striker

International career
Years	Team	Apps	(Gls)
1983–1993	Ethiopia	8	(2)

Managerial career
- 2011–2016: Defence
- 2016: Ethiopia (interim)
- 2017: Jimma Aba Buna
- 2017–2018: Jimma Aba Jifar
- 2018–2020: Mekelle City
- 2021–2022: Sidama Coffee
- 2022–2023: Ethiopian Insurance
- 2023–2024: Ethiopia

Gebremedhin Haile Bitew (Amharic: ገብረመድህን ኃይሌ) is an Ethiopian football coach who most recently the Ethiopia national football team. Often, he is referred to as 'Gebre'.

== Club career ==
Coaching Defence Force S.C. from the start of the 2011-12 Ethiopian Premier League, he vacated his position upon expiry of his contract in July 2016. Gebremedhin took Defence Force S.C. to three Ethiopian Cup finals, winning two. When managing Defence Force S.C. in 2014, he was banned for five matches for obtrusively yelling at a referee for not giving an opposing defender a red card for what he saw as violent play. The two had to be restrained to prevent the fight to escalate

In January 2017 Haile was hired as the manager of Jimma Aba Buna. In August 2018 Haile was hired to be the manager of Mekelle City FC. In 2021, Haile was hired as the manager of Sidama Coffee S.C.

== Ethiopia National Team ==
Taking over from the sacked Yohannes Sahle in May 2016, it was decided he was to be interim coach for a short term-from May to October 9, 2016.

His first game adverse to Lesotho, he beat them 2-1 before facing Seychelles in his last game at Ethiopia's helm.

Dismissed from national team manager duties in late 2016, he was replaced by Ashenafi Bekele.

=== Managerial record ===
As of match played 15 October 2024

Managerial record by team and tenure
Team	Nat	From	To	Record					Ref.
Team	Nat	From	To	G	W	D	L	Win %	Ref.
Ethiopia		2023	present	11	2	4	5	18.18	
Career Total				11	2	4	5	18.18	—

== Career statistics ==
=== International ===
Scores and results list Ethiopia's goal tally first, score column indicates score after each Gebremedhin goal.

List of international goals scored by Gebremedhin Haile
No.	Date	Venue	Opponent	Score	Result	Competition
1	28 October 1985	Addis Ababa Stadium, Addis Ababa, Ethiopia	Kenya	1–0	3–3	1986 FIFA World Cup qualification
2	9 April 1989	Addis Ababa Stadium, Addis Ababa, Ethiopia	Egypt	1–0	1–0	1990 Africa Cup of Nations qualification
