= 2017–18 Ethiopian Premier League =

72nd season of top-tier Ethiopian football

Ethiopian Premier League
- Season: 2017–18
- Dates: 4 November 2017 – 16 July 2018
- Champions: Jimma Aba Jifar
- Relegated: Mebrat Hayl (EEPCO); Arba Minch City; Woldya Kenema
- CAF Champions League: Jimma Aba Jifar
- Confederation Cup: Kedus Giorgis
- Top goalscorer: Okiki Afolabi(23)
- Biggest home win: Arba Minch City 5-0 Woldya Kenema (28 May 2018); Adama City 6-1 Mebrat Hayl (EEPCO) (5 June 2018); Jimma Aba Jifar 5-0 Adama City (16 July 2018)
- Biggest away win: Hawassa City 0-4 Mekelakeya (22 April 2018)
- Highest scoring: Dedebit 5-2 Sidama Coffee (16 December 2017); Adama City 6-1 Mebrat Hayl (EEPCO) (6 June 2018)
- Longest winning run: Dedebit (6)
- Longest unbeaten run: Jimma Aba Jifar (14)
- Longest winless run: Woldya Kenema (16)
- Longest losing run: Woldya Kenema (8)

The 2017–18 Ethiopian Premier League is the 72nd season of top-tier football in Ethiopia (20th season as the Premier League). The season began play on 4 November 2017 and ended on 16 July 2018.

== League table ==
Pos	Team	Pld	W	D	L	GF	GA	GD	Pts	Qualification or relegation
1	Jimma Aba Jifar (C)	30	15	10	5	39	15	+24	55	2018–19 CAF Champions League
2	Saint George	30	14	13	3	40	19	+21	55	2018–19 CAF Confederation Cup
3	Ethiopian Coffee	30	14	8	8	38	22	+16	50	
4	Mekelle City	30	13	10	7	26	16	+10	49	
5	Adama City	30	11	11	8	32	26	+6	44	
6	Dedebit	30	11	8	11	36	31	+5	41	
7	Fasil City	30	10	11	9	22	28	−6	41	
8	Sidama Coffee	30	9	11	10	30	33	−3	38	
9	Hawassa City	30	8	12	10	27	33	−6	36	
10	Dire Dawa City	30	7	14	9	16	17	−1	35	
11	Wolayta Dicha	30	8	11	11	25	27	−2	35	
12	Mekelakeya	30	9	8	13	23	26	−3	35	
13	Welwalo Adigrat University	30	8	11	11	22	32	−10	35	
14	Mebrat Hayl (R)	30	9	8	13	32	47	−15	35	Relegation to 2018-19 Ethiopian Higher League
15	Arba Minch Ketema (R)	30	8	9	13	25	32	−7	33	Relegation to 2018-19 Ethiopian Higher League
16	Woldia (R)	30	4	9	17	14	43	−29	21	Relegation to 2018-19 Ethiopian Higher League

Rules for classification: 1) points; 2) goal difference; 3) total goals; 4) head-to-head points; 5) head-to-head goal difference
(C) Champions; (R) Relegated

== See also ==
- 2018 Ethiopian Cup
