= Yohannes Sahle =

Ethiopian footballer and manager

Personal information
- Date of birth: 1 January 1966 (age 60)

Team information
- Current team: Ethiopia (manager); Fasil Kenema (manager)

Managerial career
- Years: Team
- Ethiopia U17
- Dedebit
- 2015–2016: Ethiopia
- 2016: Dedebit
- 2017–2018: Mekelle City
- 2018–????: Dire Dawa City
- Fasil Kenema
- 2026–: Ethiopia

Yohannes Sahle (born on 1 January 1966) is an Ethiopian football coach and former player who is the manager of the Ethiopia national team and club team Fasil Kenema.

== Playing career ==
Sahle played Ethiopian club football in the 1980s.

== Coaching career ==
After his playing career he emigrated to the United States, gaining citizenship.

He returned to Ethiopia in 2010, working as technical director of the Ethiopian Football Federation. He later managed the Ethiopian under-17 national team and club side Dedebit.

He was appointed manager of the Ethiopia national team in April 2015. He was replaced by Gebremedhin Haile in May 2016.

After taking charge of the Dedebit in June 2016, he was sacked just 3 matches into the 2016–17 season. Sahle finished with a 1–1–2 record in the brief time he spent at the club.

Sahle coached Mekelle City during the 2017–18 Season, leading the team to a 4th-place finish in their debut season in the first division of Ethiopia Football, the Ethiopian Premier League, with a 13–10–7 record amassing 49 points. Sahle left the club after one year at the helm.

Sahle became the coach of Dire Dawa City on 3 August 2018.

In January 2026 he became manager of Ethiopia, combining his role with that of club team Fasil Kenema.
