= Ramadan Yusef =

Ethiopian footballer (born 2001)

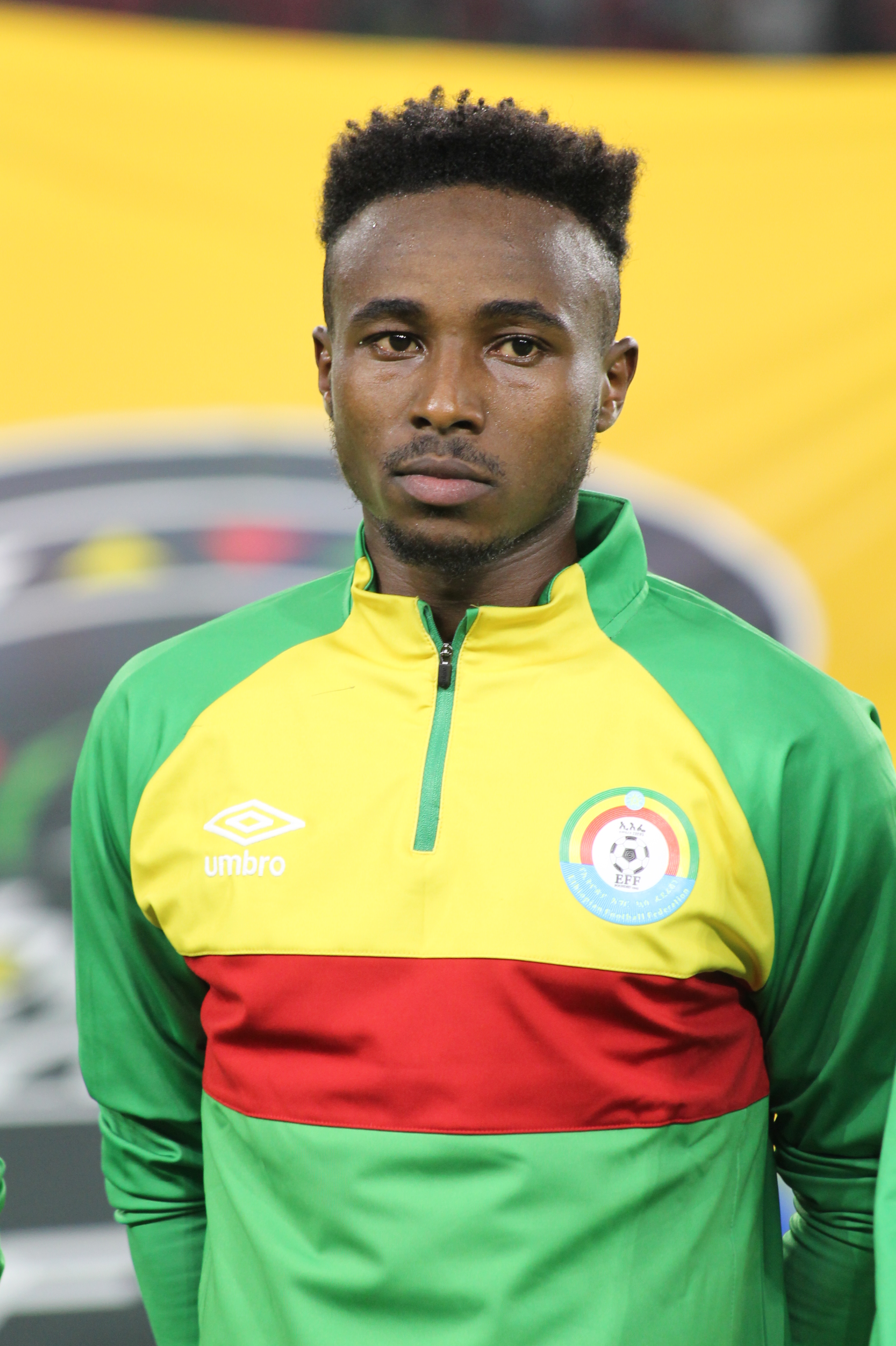
- Yusef with Ethiopia at the 2021 Africa Cup of Nations

Personal information
- Full name: Ramadan Yusef Mohammed
- Date of birth: 12 February 2001 (age 25)
- Place of birth: Asosa, Ethiopia
- Height: 1.70 m (5 ft 7 in)
- Position: Left-back

Team information
- Current team: Ethiopian Insurance
- Number: 33

Senior career*
| Years | Team | Apps | (Gls) |
| 2018–2020 | Shire Endaselassie | 15 | (1) |
| 2020–2022 | Wolkite City | 59 | (3) |
| 2022–2024 | Saint George | 45 | (2) |
| 2024– | Ethiopian Insurance | 4 | (1) |

International career^{‡}
| 2019– | Ethiopia | 43 | (1) |
- * Club domestic league appearances and goals as of 21:47, 2 March 2024 (UTC) ‡ National team caps and goals as of 21:47, 21 March 2024 (UTC)

Ramadan Yusef Mohammed (Amharic: ረመዳን ዩሱፍ መሀመድ; born 12 February 2001) is an Ethiopian professional footballer who plays as a left-back for Ethiopian Premier League club Ethiopian Insurance and the Ethiopia national team.

== Club career ==
=== Shire Endaselassie ===
Yusef began his career with Shire Endaselassie and made his debut in the 2018–19 Ethiopian Premier League season.

=== Wolkite City ===
On 1 October 2020, Yusef signed with Wolkite City.

=== Saint George ===
On 11 July 2022, Yusef signed with Saint George.

== International career ==
Yusef made his international debut with the Ethiopia national team in a 0–0 2022 FIFA World Cup qualification tie with Lesotho on 4 September 2019.

On 23 December 2021, Yusef was included in the Ethiopian squad for the 2021 Africa Cup of Nations.
