= Mohammed Muntari Tagoe =

Ghanaian footballer (born 1992)

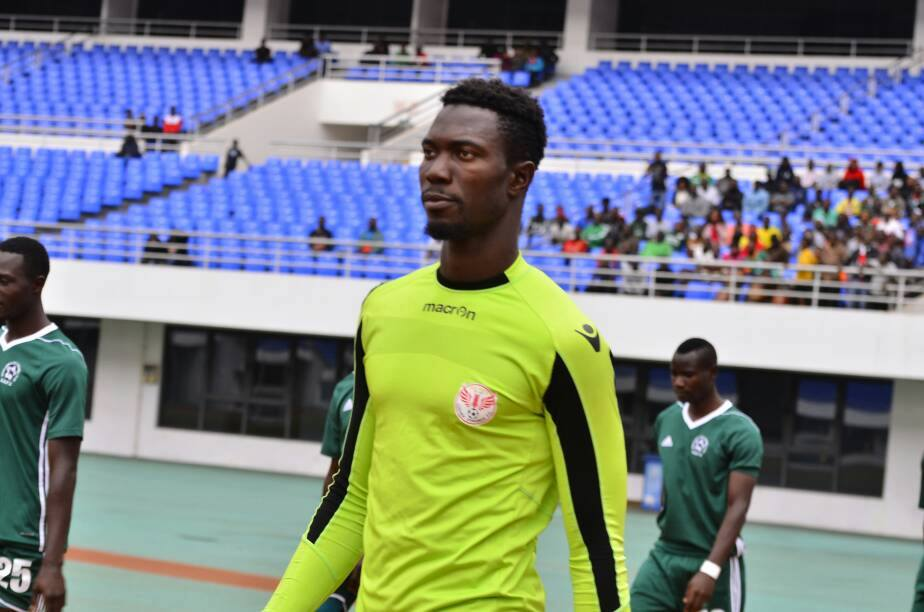

Personal information
- Full name: Mohammed Muntari Tagoe
- Date of birth: 8 January 1992 (age 34)
- Place of birth: Accra, Ghana
- Height: 1.93 m (6 ft 4 in)
- Position: Goalkeeper

Team information
- Current team: Hawassa City
- Number: 1

Youth career
- 2008–2010: Madina Youth FC

Senior career*
Years	Team	Apps	(Gls)
2010–2017	Medeama	86	(0)
2017–2018	Lusaka Dynamos	34	(0)
2018–2019	Asante Kotoko	0	(0)
2019–	Jimma Aba Jifar		

International career
2012–2013	Ghana U20	14	(0)
2016	Ghana A'	13	(0)
- * Club domestic league appearances and goals as of 11:58, 16 August 2017 (UTC)

Mohammed Muntari Tagoe (born 8 January 1992) is a Ghanaian professional footballer who plays as a goalkeeper for Ethiopian Premier League club Hawassa City.

== Club career ==
=== Madina Youth FC ===
Muntari spent a number of seasons with Madina Youth FC (third-tier side in Accra) before he joined Medeama S.C. of Tarkwa. He played there from 2008 to 2010.

=== Medeama SC (2010-2017) ===
Tagoe joined Medeama S.C. in the 2010–2011 Ghana Premier League season where he signed a long-term contract. He spent a total of six seasons at the Tarkwa and Aboaso Park. He won three trophies at the club including two FA Cup titles. He was the captain of the team as of 2014–2016.

Tagoe featured in Medeama 3–1 defeat to TP Mazembe in the CAF Confederation Cup in 2016, he made lots of saves which prevented TP Mazembe from getting more in before half time. Medeama SC knocked out Al Ittihad and Al Shendy of Libya and Sudan respectively in the previous rounds to book a ticket with Mamelodi Sundowns.

=== Lusaka Dynamos F.C.(2017) ===
Muntari signed a two-year deal with Lusaka Dynamos F.C. In February 2017.

=== Jimma Aba Jifar ===
In October 2019, he joined Ethiopian side Jimma Aba Jifar, after terminating his contract with Kumasi Asante Kotoko. He returned to Ghana in July 2020, amidst the COVID-19 pandemic.

== International career ==
In 2012, Ghana U20 coach Maxwell Konadu invited 27 players to start preparing for the 2013 African Youth Championship final qualifier against Morocco. Muntari was included in the squad. He was also enlisted in the 18-man squad to face Uganda in July 2012 in a penultimate 2013 African Youth Championship qualifier. Muntari was also featured in the local Black Stars team that was invited by coach Maxwell Konadu to start preparations ahead of their international friendly match against Japan U23 national team on May 11, 2016.

== Honours ==
Medeama

- Ghanaian FA Cup: 2013, 2015
- Ghana Super Cup: 2016

Individual

- Ghanaian Premier League Best Goalkeeper nominee: 2012, 2014
- Ghanaian FA Cup Best Goalkeeper Award: 2013, 2015
