= Ernest Barfo =

Ghanaian footballer

Personal information
- Date of birth: 19 September 1992 (age 34)
- Place of birth: Accra, Ghana
- Height: 1.89 m (6 ft 2 in)
- Position: Forward

Team information
- Current team: Kaya–Iloilo
- Number: 9

Senior career*
Years	Team	Apps	(Gls)
2013–2014	Asswehly		
2014–2017	Bechem United	12	(9)
2017	Al-Nasr	15	(10)
2017–2018	Al-Tai	20	(13)
2018–2019	Al-Nasr		
2019–2020	Chabab Ghazieh		
2020	Yangon United	16	(10)
2021–2023	Defence Force	9	(7)
2023	Sitra Club		
2024–2025	Calicut	11	(1)
- * Club domestic league appearances and goals

Ernest Barfo (born 19 September 1992), is a Ghanaian professional footballer who plays as a forward for Kaya F.C.–Iloilo.

== Honours ==
Calicut FC

- Super League Kerala: 2024
