= Mamadou Sidibé =

Malian footballer

Personal information
- Date of birth: 28 December 1992 (age 33)
- Place of birth: Mali
- Height: 1.85 m (6 ft 1 in)
- Position: Forward

Team information
- Current team: Bahir Dar Kenema
- Number: 17

Senior career*
Years	Team	Apps	(Gls)
2011–2014	AS Police		
2014–2016	Olympique Khouribga	59	(10)
2016	Moghreb Tétouan	0	(0)
2016–2017	CA Khénifra	11	(0)
2017	Rachad Bernoussi		
2017–2018	Rapide Oued Zem	21	(6)
2018–2019	Jimma Aba Jifar		
2019–2020	Bahir Dar Kenema		
2020–2022	Sidama Coffee		
2022	Dire Dawa City		
2023–	Bahir Dar Kenema		

International career
2013–2014	Mali	8	(1)
- * Club domestic league appearances and goals as of 15:56, 26 December 2023 (UTC)

Mamadou Sidibé (born 28 December 1992) is a Malian professional footballer who plays as a forward for Ethiopian Premier League club Bahir Dar Kenema.

== Club career ==
Sidibé played for AS Police de Bamako from 2011 to 2014, when he transferred to Olympique Khouribga.

== International career ==
In January 2014, coach Djibril Dramé, invited him to be a part of the Mali squad for the 2014 African Nations Championship. He helped the team to the quarter-finals where they lost to Zimbabwe by two goals to one.
