= Beer in Ethiopia =

Beer in Ethiopia is the most popular industrial alcoholic beverage in the country with lager being the most consumed type of beer. In the rural sector, the home-brewed tella or siwa are still dominant.

== History ==
The first brewery in Ethiopia was established in 1922 by St. George Beer (named after the patron saint of Ethiopia). Brands like Meta and Bedele are also older in Ethiopia but have since been acquired by foreign companies and re-branded.

== Industry ==
Ethiopia's beer industry has grown tremendously in the last two decades. It transformed into one of the most competitive industries in Ethiopia, with millions of birr spent on advertisements alone. The industry's competitiveness has led to more investment in farming, such as in malt production.

Top 15 beer brands in Ethiopia according to RateBeer.com (as of 2017)

Rank	Name	Score	Count	Style
1	Garden Bräu Ebony	2.82	4	Dunkel/Tmavý
2	Garden Bräu Blondy	2.77	4	Dortmunder/Helles
3	St George Amber Beer (Ethiopia)	2.72	61	Amber Lager/Vienna
4	Hakim Stout	2.72	193	Foreign Stout
5	Raya Beer	2.69	5	Pale Lager
6	Bedele Beer	2.60	22	Pale Lager
7	Habesha Cold Gold	2.51	11	Pale Lager
8	Walia	2.48	10	Pale Lager
9	Harar	2.38	128	Pale Lager
10	Meta Premium	2.25	63	Premium Lager
11	Bedele Special Beer	2.24	65	Pale Lager
12	Castel Beer (Ethiopia)	2.18	60	Pale Lager
13	Meta Beer Export Lager	2.18	71	Pale Lager
14	St. George Beer	2.16	208	Pale Lager
15	Dashen Beer	2.04	28	Pale Lager

== Brands ==
- Meta (ሜታ ቢራ)
- Bedele (በደሌ ቢራ)
- Dashen (ዳሽን ቢራ)
- Jano (ጃኖ)
- Habesha (ሐበሻ ቢራ)
- Harar (ሐረር ቢራ)
- Walia (ዋልያ ቢራ)
- Raya (ራያ ቢራ)
- Balageru
- Azmera
- St. George Beer (ቅዱስ ጊዮርጊስ ቢራ)
- St. George Amber
- Zebedar Beer
- Heineken
- Castel
- Hakim Stout
- Garden Bräu Ebony
- Garden Bräu Blondy
- Anbessa ()

== Competition with home-brewed beers ==
As living standards increase, the more affluent segment of rural society frequently shifts from home-brewed beer to lager beer. Industrial breweries have seen this emerging market and prepared specific brands targeted at farmers: Balageru (meaning: the rural people) and Azmera beers (meaning: "good cropping season").

== See also ==
- Beer in Africa
- Beer by region
