= Behailu Assefa =

Ethiopian footballer

Personal information
- Date of birth: 30 December 1989 (age 36)
- Place of birth: Awasa
- Height: 1.68 m (5 ft 6 in)
- Position: Midfielder

Team information
- Current team: Sebeta City

Senior career*
Years	Team	Apps	(Gls)
2008–2010	Awassa City		
2010–2013	Dedebit		
2013–2019	Saint George		
2019–2023	Sebeta City		

International career^{‡}
2009–2016	Ethiopia	32	(1)
Medal record
First place	Ethiopian Premier League	2013
First place	Ethiopian Cup	2013
First place	Ethiopian Premier League	2013
First place	Ethiopian Premier League	2014
First place	Ethiopian Premier League	2015
First place	Ethiopian Super Cup	2015
First place	Ethiopian Premier League	2016
First place	Ethiopian Cup	2016
First place	Ethiopian Premier League	2017
First place	Ethiopian Super Cup	2017
- * Club domestic league appearances and goals as of 19 December 2022 ‡ National team caps and goals as of 19 December 2022

Behailu Assefa (born 30 December 1989) is an Ethiopian footballer. He plays for Sebeta City and Ethiopia national football team as a midfielder.
