= Wolkite City FC =

Association football club in Ethiopia

Wolkite City
- Full name: Wolkite City Football Club
- Nickname(s): ሠራተኞቹ (The Workers) ክትፎዎቹ (The Kitfo eaters)
- Short name: Wolkite Ketema
- Founded: 2010; 15 years ago
- Ground: Wolkite Stadium
- Capacity: 1,500
- Manager: Mulugeta Mihret
- League: Ethiopian Higher League
- 2023–24: Ethiopian Premier League, 14th of 16 (relegated)
Home colours	Away colours	Third colours

Wolkite City Football Club (Amharic: ወልቂጤ ከተማ, Wolkite Ketema) is a professional football club based in Wolkite, Ethiopia. They play in the Ethiopian Higher League, the second division of football in Ethiopia.

== History ==
Wolkite Ketema was founded in 2010. The club last played in the second division, Ethiopian Higher League, during the 2018–2019 season. That season Wolkite earned a promotion to the Ethiopian Premier League by finishing top of their respective group. To strengthen their team for their first season in the top flight, they signed a Ghanaian international Kweku Andoh, who most recently played for Ethiopian champions Mekelle 70 Enderta.

Wolkite officially signed a two-year kit deal with Singapore-based apparel maker Mafro Sports in September 2019.

== Support ==
Wolkite City enjoys a strong fan base with supporters often traveling with the team during away matches.

== Stadium ==
The club plays its home matches at Wolkite Stadium. The pitch at the stadium was renovated in 2019 as a result of the Ethiopian Premier League's governing body deeming it unfit to host premier league matches.

== Ownership ==
The club has been owned by the Wolkite city administration since its founding in 2010. In February 2021, the club board announced that 51% of the club would be sold as shares to the public with 49% staying under the city administration.

== Departments ==
The club has a team competing in the U20 Ethiopian Premier League.

=== Active departments ===
- Football team (U20)
- Basketball team

== Players ==
=== First-team squad ===
As of 18 August 2023

Note: Flags indicate national team as defined under FIFA eligibility rules; some limited exceptions apply. Players may hold more than one non-FIFA nationality.

No.	Pos.	Nation	Player
1	GK	ETH	Jemal Tassew
3	MF	ETH	Ephrem Zekarias
4	DF	ETH	Mohammed Shafi
6	MF	ETH	Asari Al-Mehadi
7	FW	ETH	Ame Mohammed
8	MF	ETH	Asrat Megersa
10	FW	ETH	Ahmed Hussein
11	MF	ETH	Abubeker Sunni
12	DF	ETH	Tesfaye Negash
13	MF	ETH	Firew Solomon
14	MF	ETH	Abdulkerim Worku
15	DF	ETH	Tesfaye Melaku
16	DF	ETH	Yibeltal Shibabaw

No.	Pos.	Nation	Player
17	DF	ETH	Adane Belayneh
18	MF	ETH	Behailu Teshager
19	DF	ETH	Dagim Nigussie
20	MF	ETH	Yared Tadesse
21	MF	ETH	Habtamu Shewalem
22	GK	ETH	George Desta
23	DF	ETH	Yibeltale Shebabaw
25	MF	ETH	Mulugeta Woldegiorgis
26	FW	ETH	Henok Ayele
27	MF	ETH	Muhajir Meki
28	MF	ETH	Fuad Abdella
30	DF	ETH	Tomas Simretu
99	GK	ETH	Yohannes Bezabeh

== Club officials ==
Vice-president: (Ethiopia) Abebaw Solomon

=== Coaching staff ===
As of 2 March 2021

Team leader: (Ethiopia) Kamel Jemal

Manager/head coach: (Ethiopia) Degarege Yigzaw

First assistant coach: (Ethiopia) Abdulali Tessema

First-team goalkeeper coach: (Ethiopia) Belete Wedajo

Team doctor: (Ethiopia) Mohammed Sied

== Former players ==
- (Ethiopia) Abdulrahman Mubarek
- (Ethiopia) Abdulkerim Worku
- (Ethiopia) Ramadan Yusef
- (Ethiopia) Tomas Simretu
- (Ethiopia) Jemal Tasew
- (Ghana) Mohamed Awal
