= Habesha Breweries S.C. =

Ethiopian brewery and beverage making company

- Type: Private
- Industry: Brewery; Beverage
- Founded: 2009
- Headquarters: Rebecca Building, Yeka sub-city, Addis Ababa, Ethiopia
- Area served: Ethiopia
- Key people: Omo Ohiwerei (CEO)
- Products: Negus
- Production output: 650,000 hectoliters to 1.5 million hectoliters (2017)
- Revenue: $7.4 million (2024)
- Owner: Royal Swinkels
- Number of employees: 300 (2023)
- Website: www.habeshabreweries.com

Habesha Breweries S.C. is an Ethiopian brewery and beverage making company owned by Dutch company Swinkels Family Brewers Holding N.V with 60% share, 8,000 local shareholders and Linssen Participations B.V. Founded in 2009, Habesha is the largest beverage producing company with annual production capacity of 650,000 hectoliters to 1.5 million hectoliters in 2017. Its brewery plant is located in Debre Birhan with a plan of its strategic market in Addis Ababa and Debre Birhan.

In 2019, the company signed 50 million euro agreement with the International Finance Corporation (IFC) to extract barley source from smallholder farmers. It was funded by the Dutch Development Bank, Rabobank and ING Bank. The company commenced developmental program of barley chain producing. Since 2021, the current CEO of Habesha Breweries is Omo Ohiwerei.

== History ==
Habesha Breweries S.C. was founded in 2009 by a group of Ethiopian investors. It is owned by Dutch company Swinkels Family Brewers Holding N.V with 60% share, 8,000 local shareholders (30%), and Linssen Participations B.V (10%). Habesha is the largest beverage company in Ethiopia producing annual capacity from 650,000 hectoliters to 1.5 million hectoliters as of 2017. The brewery plant is located in Debre Birhan that involved in the production with a brand name of "Negus", and aimed its market distribution through Debre Birhan and Addis Ababa. In 2019, Habesha Breweries signed to the International Finance Corporation (IFC) with 50 million euro agreement to extract barley source from smallholder farmers funded by the Dutch Development Bank, Rabobank and ING Bank. In 2023, the company set development of barley chain program to become self-sufficient barley producer.

Omo Ohiwerei is the current CEO of Habesha Breweries since 2021.

== See also ==
- Beer in Ethiopia
