= Aseged Tesfaye =

Ethiopian footballer

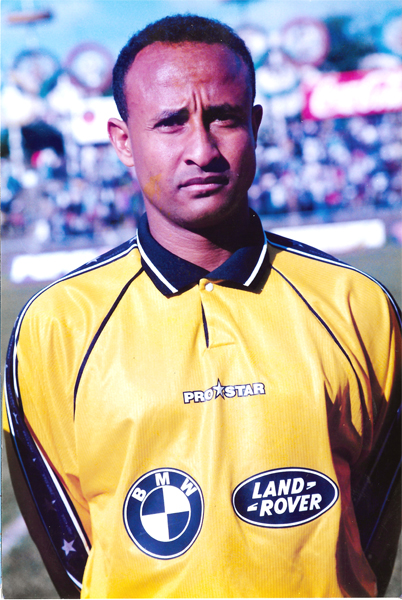

Personal information
- Full name: Asseged Tesfaye
- Date of birth: 1970/1971
- Place of birth: Dire Dawa, Ethiopian Empire
- Date of death: 3 June 2017
- Place of death: Addis Ababa, Ethiopia
- Position: Striker

Youth career
- --: Dire Dawa Coca-Cola

Senior career*
Years	Team	Apps	(Gls)
1986	Dire Dawa Coca-Cola		
1986–1991	Saint George S.C.		
1991–1996	Ethiopian Insurance F.C.		
1996–2001	Ethiopian Coffee S.C.		

International career
1990–2001	Ethiopia		
- * Club domestic league appearances and goals

Aseged Tesfaye (Amharic: አሰግድ ተስፋዬ 1970/1971 – 3 June 2017) was an Ethiopian former professional footballer who played as a forward on numerous Ethiopian football clubs and the Ethiopian National football team.

== Early life ==
Tesfaye was born and raised in the city of Dire Dawa in the eastern part of Ethiopia. He started his footballing career with the likes of local football clubs Saint Michael, Cotton FC, and Dire Dawa Coca-Cola. He later moved to the capital, Addis Ababa, in 1986 to continue his footballing career with Saint George.

== Club career ==
Tesfaye was a revered forward, widely considered one of the best Ethiopia has ever produced. He was known for perfecting the role of a false nine.

=== Dire Dawa Coca-Cola ===
He started his career with his hometown side Dire Dawa Coca-Cola in the 1980s.

=== Saint George S.C. ===
Saint George was the first team Tesfaye joined after he came from Dire Dawa to Addis Ababa. Tesfaye initially started on the B team of Saint George before shortly working his way into the senior side.

=== Ethiopia Insurance F.C. ===
His success continued with his move to Ethiopia Insurance F.C. playing some of his best football during his time with the club.

=== Ethiopian Coffee S.C. ===
While at the club Tesfaye is remembered for becoming the first player to score five goals in a single CAF club championship match. This he achieved against Seychelles side St. Michel United FC in the CAF Champions League, a record which holds to date. He retired at this club.

== National team ==
Tesfaye played for the Ethiopian National Football Team for over a decade, mostly during the 1990s.

== Death ==
After playing a pick-up game with friends, Tesfaye was found collapsed in the shower and rushed to the hospital where he was later pronounced dead. Later it was revealed that Tesfaye, age 46, died as a result of a heart attack. His funeral took place on June 5, 2017, at Sahlitemihret Church in Addis Ababa, Ethiopia.
