= Jimma Aba Buna SC =

Association football club in Ethiopia

Jimma Aba Buna
- Full name: Jimma Aba Buna Sport Club
- Nickname: Jimma buna
- Founded: 1955; 71 years ago
- Ground: Jimma Stadium; Jimma, Ethiopia
- Capacity: 15,000
- Chairman: Abdulraheim Abagero
- Manager: Anteneh Abera
- League: Ethiopian Higher League
- 2020–21: Higher League 9th of 12 (Group B)
Home colours	Away colours

Jimma Aba Buna Sport Club (Amharic: ጅማ አባቡና ስፖርት ክለብ, Afaan Oromo: Jimmaa Abbaa Bunaa) is an Ethiopian football club based in Jimma, Ethiopia. They currently play in the Ethiopian Higher League, the second division of football in Ethiopia.

== History ==
Jimma Aba Buna was founded in 1955 in the southwestern Ethiopian city of Jimma. During the 1960s EC the club was one of the most competitive clubs in the top league of Ethiopian Football.

In 2013 (2006 E.C.) the club was re-established after initially folding years earlier. After the 2015–16 season the club was promoted to the Ethiopian Premier League for the first time after being re-established two years earlier. The following year the club released their manager Dereje Belay midway through the season instead hiring Gebremedhin Haile to replace him. However, later that season the team was relegated from the top league after only one season.

The club let go of manager Dereje Belay and hired Anteneh Abera as his replacement midway through their 2017–18 Ethiopian Higher League season. They finished second in group B of the 2017–18 Ethiopian Higher League season by virtue earning a playoff spot against runners up in Group A, Shire Endeselassie (the winner is promoted to the Ethiopian Premier League).

== Finances ==
The main sponsor for Jimma Aba Buna as of 2016 was the locally based company Horizon Plantation, who contributes 3 million birr annually to the club's budget. The club's total budget for the 2015–16 season was 14 million birr which was up from 570,000 birr just 3 years prior.

During the 2017–18 season the club experienced significant financial problems.

== Former managers ==
- (Ethiopia) Girma Habteyohannes (2017–2018)
- (Ethiopia) Gebremedhin Haile (2017)
- (Ethiopia) Dereje Belay

== Former players ==
- (Ethiopia) Abdulraheim Abagero (Nicknamed "Jimma's Pele")
