= Bahir Dar Kenema FC =

Association football club in Ethiopia

Bahir Dar Kenema
- Full name: Bahir Dar Kenema Football Club
- Nickname: The Waves of Tana
- Short name: Bahir Dar Kenema
- Founded: 1973 EC
- Ground: Bahir Dar Stadium
- Capacity: 60,000
- Manager: Degarege Yigzaw
- League: Ethiopian Premier League
- 2025–26: 11th of 16
- Website: https://bahirdarcitysc.com
Home colours	Away colours	Third colours

Bahir Dar Kenema Football Club (Amharic: ባህርዳር ከነማ እግር ኳስ ክለብ) also known as Bahir Dar City, is an Ethiopian professional football club based in Bahir Dar. They play in the Ethiopian Premier League, the top division of football in Ethiopia.

== History ==
Bahir Dar Kenema was established in 1973 EC in the city of Bahir Dar.

Bahir Dar enjoyed a good run of form in the 2017–18 season leading Group A of the Ethiopian Higher League with 31 points after the 14th week.

On July 29, 2018, the club secured promotion to the Ethiopian Premier League for the first time in its history after beating Ethiopian Insurance F.C. The win assured them the top spot in group A in the Ethiopian Higher League (second tier) with three games to spare in their 2017–18 season, by virtue securing their spot in the top league the next season.

On August 6, 2018, the club announced they had extended the contract of Paulos Getachew through the 2018–19 season.

in September 2022 Dahir Dar Kenema announced the new coach Degarege Yigzaw who is the past player of Bahir Dar and Saint George.

== Stadium ==
Bahir Dar Kenema play their home matches at Bahir Dar International Stadium. They share the stadium with Amhara Weha Sera, another club based in Bahir Dar.

== Support ==
Bahir Dar Kenema enjoy a strong fan base with supporters often travelling with the team during away matches.

== Departments ==
=== Active departments ===
- Women's Football Team
- Under 20 Men's football team

== Players ==
=== First-team squad ===
As of 31 July 2023

Note: Flags indicate national team as defined under FIFA eligibility rules; some limited exceptions apply. Players may hold more than one non-FIFA nationality.

No.	Pos.	Nation	Player
1	GK	CIV	Ira Eliezer Tapé
2	DF	ETH	Fetudin Jemal
3	DF	ETH	Henok Isaias
5	MF	ETH	Getachew Animut
6	DF	ETH	Dawit Worku
7	FW	ETH	Duresa Shubisa
8	MF	ETH	Yabsira Tesfaye
9	FW	ETH	Fasil Asmamawe
10	FW	ETH	Fuad Fereje
11	FW	ETH	Fitsum Tilahun
12	MF	ETH	Bereket Tigabu
13	DF	ETH	Firaol Mengistu
14	DF	ETH	Yihenew Yemata

No.	Pos.	Nation	Player
17	FW	MLI	Mamadou Sidibé
18	DF	ETH	Salamlak Tegegn
19	GK	ETH	Yigermal Mekuanint
20	MF	NGA	Charles Ribbanu
21	MF	ETH	Fikremikael Alemu (captain)
23	MF	ETH	Alelign Azene
24	FW	ETH	Adem Abas
25	FW	ETH	Habtamu Tadesse
27	DF	ETH	Mesay Agegnehu
28	DF	ETH	Tesfaye Tamirat
29	FW	ETH	Yibeltal Ayele
30	DF	ETH	Fisum Fitalew
31	DF	ETH	Amsalu Sale
32	FW	ETH	Feysal Ahmed
40	GK	ETH	Nurhusen Mohamed

== Club officials ==
=== Coaching staff ===
As of 1 January 2023

Manager/Head Coach: (Ethiopia) Degarege yigzaw

Assistant Coach and Performance Analyst : (Ethiopia) Mebratu habtu

Assistant Coach: (Ethiopia) Dereje mengistu

GK Coach: (Ethiopia) Ashagre

nutrition : (Ethiopia) Dr tesfaye

team leader : (Ethiopia) Henok habtu

== Former players ==
- (Ethiopia) Alex Amuzu
