= Shire Endaselassie FC =

Association football club in Ethiopia

Shire Endaselassie
- Full name: Shire Endaselassie Football Club
- Nickname: Sehul Shire
- Short name: Shire
- Founded: 2012 (2005 E.C.)
- Ground: Tigray Stadium; Shire Stadium
- Capacity: 60,000
- Chairman: (Ethiopia) Tesfay Alem
- Manager: (Ethiopia) Daniel Tsehaye
- League: Ethiopian Higher League (II)
- 2025–26: 17th
Home colours	Away colours

Shire Endaselassie Football Club (Amharic: ሽረ እንዳሥላሴ, also known as Sihul Shire FC) is an Ethiopian football club based in Shire, Ethiopia. They are a member of the Ethiopian Football Federation and play in the Ethiopian Premier League, the first division of football in Ethiopia.

== History ==
Shire Endaselassie was established in 2012 (2005 EC) in the city of Shire.

The club joined the National League system in 2013–14(2006 EC) season and was later promoted to the 2016–17 (2009 EC) Ethiopian Higher League season.

The club was promoted to the 2018-19 Ethiopian Premier League after winning a playoff match against Jimma Aba Buna held in Hawassa Ethiopia. This was the club's first promotion the top tier of Ethiopian football.

== Finances ==
The club is run and funded by the Shire Inda Selassie municipality. Due to this the club has restricted financial resources and inadequate training facilities.

== Club officials ==
=== Coaching staff ===
- Manager: (Ethiopia) Daniel Tsehaye
- First Assistant Coach: (Ethiopia) Bereket Gebremedhin
