= Shashemene City F.C. =

Association football club in Ethiopia

Shashemene City
- Full name: Shashemene City Football Club
- Founded: 1993; 33 years ago
- Ground: Shashemene Stadium Shashemene, Ethiopia
- Capacity: 1,000
- Manager: Tsegaye Wondimu
- League: Ethiopian Higher League
Home colours

Shashemene City Football Club (a.k.a. Shashemene Kenema) is an Ethiopian professional football club, in the city of Shashemene, Misraq Shewa Zone, Oromia Region. They play in the Ethiopian Premier League, the top level of professional football in Ethiopia.
