= Woldia City =

Association football club in Ethiopia

- Full name: Woldia Kenema Football Club
- Ground: Mohammed Hussein Ali Al-Amoudi Stadium
- Capacity: 25,155
- League: Ethiopian Premier League
- 2014–15: 14th
Home colours

Woldia City is an Ethiopian football club based in the city of Woldia. They currently play in the Ethiopian Premier League, the top domestic level of football in Ethiopia.
