= Dashen Beer FC =

Association football club in Ethiopia

Dashen Beer
- Full name: Dashen Beer Football Club
- Founded: 2004; 22 years ago
- Dissolved: 2016; 10 years ago
- Ground: Fasiledes Stadium
- Capacity: 5,000
- League: Ethiopian Premier League
- 2015–16: 13th
Home colours

Dashen Beer Football Club (Amharic: ዳሽን ቢራ) was a professional Ethiopian football club based in Gondar. They were a member of the Ethiopian Football Federation until the club was dissolved in 2016.

== History ==
The club was founded and run by Dashen Brewery. The club played in the Ethiopian Premier League until being relegated after the 2015–16 season. The club folded after its relegation from the top division.

== Stadium ==
Their home stadium Was Gondar Stadium.

== Former players ==
- (Ethiopia) Dereje Alemu
- (Ethiopia) Aynalem Hailu
- (Ethiopia) Asrat Megersa
- (Ethiopia) Yonathan Kebede
- (Ethiopia) Ephrem Wondwesen
- (Ethiopia) Tewdros Gitsadik
- (Ethiopia) Suleman Ahmed
- (Ethiopia) Muluneh Getahun
- (Ethiopia) Mesfin Wendemu
- (Ethiopia) Yared Zewdeneh
- (Ethiopia) Faysei Mohammed
- (Ethiopia) Jilalo Shafi
- (Ethiopia) Dereje Hailu
- (Ethiopia) Yetesha Gizaw
- (Ethiopia) Ermias Hailu
- (Ethiopia) Adamu Numoro
- (Ethiopia) Tewderos Getenet
- (Ethiopia) Haileeyesus Berehanu
- (Ethiopia) Wekil Redi
- (Ethiopia) Webeshet Kasaye
- (Ethiopia) Ashenafi Yetayew
- (Ethiopia) Menyahel Yimer
