= Muger Cement =

Association football club in Ethiopia

- Full name: Muger Cement
- Founded: 1986
- Ground: Wonji Stadium; Oromia, Ethiopia
- Capacity: 14,000
- Chairman: Geremew Kebede
- League: Ethiopian Premier League
- 2014–15: 13th
Home colours	Away colours

Muger Cement (Amharic: ሙገር ሲሚንቶ) is a professional Ethiopian football club based in Wonji. They are a member of the Ethiopian Football Federation national league.

== History ==
Muger Cement played in the Ethiopian Premier League until they were relegated after the 2014-15 season.

== Stadium ==
Their home stadium is Wonji Stadium.

== Active departments ==
- Volleyball team

== Honors ==
=== Domestic ===
- Ethiopian Cup: 1

1994

== Former players ==
- (Ethiopia) Abel Mamo

== See also ==
- Durba
