= Ethiopian Cup =

Annual association football tournament in Ethiopia

- Founded: 1945
- 2026 Ethiopian Cup

The Ethiopian Cup is the top knockout tournament of the Ethiopian football. It was created in 1945.

== Winners ==
- 1945 : British Military Mission-BMME (Addis Abeba)
- 1946 : Army (Addis Abeba)
- 1947 : Polisportiva (Addis Abeba)
- 1948 : Body Guard (Addis Abeba)
- 1949 : Army (Addis Abeba)
- 1950 : Army (Addis Abeba)
- 1951 : Army (Addis Abeba)
- 1952 : Saint-George SA (Addis Abeba)
- 1953 : Saint-George SA (Addis Abeba)
- 1954 : Army (Addis Abeba)
- 1955 : Mechal (Addis Abeba)
- 1956 : Mechal (Addis Abeba)
- 1957 : Saint-George SA (Addis Abeba)
- 1958 : Mekuria (Addis Abeba)
- 1959 : Omedla (Addis Abeba) (Police)
- 1960 : Nib (Bishoftu) (Air Force)
- No Cup between 1961 and 1969
- 1970 : Asmara (Asmara)
- 1971 : EEPCO (Addis Abeba)
- 1972 : EEPCO (Addis Abeba)
- 1973 : Saint-George SA (Addis Abeba)
- 1974 : Saint-George SA (Addis Abeba)
- 1975 : Mechal (Addis Abeba)
- 1976 : EEPCO (Addis Abeba)
- 1977 : Saint-George SA (Addis Abeba)
- 1978 : Omedla (Addis Abeba)
- 1979 : no cup
- 1980 : Ermejachen (Addis Abeba)
- 1981 : Key Bahr "Red Sea" (Eritrea)
- 1982 : Mechal (Addis Abeba)
- 1983 : Key Bahr "Red Sea" (Eritrea)
- 1984 : Eritrea Shoes (Eritrea)
- 1985 : Eritrea Shoes (Eritrea)
- 1986 : Building Construction (Addis Abeba)
- 1987 : Eritrea Shoes (Eritrea)
- 1988 : Bunna Gebeya
- 1989 : no cup
- 1990 : Mechal (Addis Abeba)
- No Cup between 1991 and 1992
- 1993 : Saint-George SA (Addis Abeba)
- 1994 : Muger Cement (Adama)
- 1995 : Medhin (Addis Abeba) (Insurance)
- 1996 : Awassa Flour Mill (Awassa)
- 1997 : Wolaita Tussa S.C. (Wolaita Sodo)
- 1998 : Ethiopian Coffee (Addis Abeba) 4-2 (a.p.) Saint-George SA (Addis Abeba)
- 1999 : Saint-George SA (Addis Abeba)
- 2000 : Ethiopian Coffee (Addis Abeba) 2-1 Awassa Kenema (Awassa)
- 2001 : EEPCO (Addis Abeba) 2-1 (a.p.) Guna Trading FC (Mekelé)
- 2002 : Medhin (Addis Abeba) 0 - 0 (6 - 3) EEPCO (Addis Abeba)
- 2003 : Ethiopian Coffee (Addis Abeba) 2-0 EEPCO (Addis Abeba)
- 2004 : Banks SC (Addis Abeba) 1-0 Ethiopian Coffee (Addis Abeba)
- 2005 : Awassa Kenema (Awassa) 2-2 Muger Cement (Nazareth) (Awassa gagne aux tirs aux buts)
- 2006 : Mekelakeya (Addis Abeba) 1-0 Ethiopian Coffee (Addis Abeba)
- 2007 : Harrar Beer Botling F.C.
- 2008 : Ethiopian Coffee (Addis Abeba) 2-1 Awassa Kenema (Awassa)
- 2009-10 : Dedebit (Addis Abeba) 1-0 Saint-George SA (Addis Abeba)
- 2010-11 : Saint-George SA (Addis Abeba) 3-1 Muger Cement (Nazareth)
- 2012 : Not played
- 2013 : Mekelakeya (Addis Abeba) 0-0 (4-2 pen.) Saint-George SA (Addis Abeba)
- 2014 : Dedebit
- 2015 : Mekelakeya (Addis Abeba) 2-0 Awassa Kenema (Awassa)
- 2016 : Saint-George SA (Addis Abeba) 1-1 (4-3 pen.) Mekelakeya (Addis Abeba)
- 2017 : Welayta Dicha (Sodo) 1-1 (4-3 pen.) Mekelakeya (Addis Abeba)
- 2018 : Mekelakeya (Addis Abeba) 0-0 (3-2 pen.) Saint-George SA (Addis Abeba)
- 2019 : Fasil Kenema (Gonder) 1-1 (pen.) Awassa Kenema (Awassa)
- No Cup between 2020 and 2023
- 2024 : Ethiopian Coffee (Addis Abeba) 2-1 Wolaitta Dicha (Wolaita Sodo)
- 2025 : Wolayta Dicha (Wolaita Sodo) 1-2 (3-0 awarded) Sidama Coffee (Sidama)
- 2026 : Welwalo Adigrat (Adigrat) 2-0 Sidama Coffee (Sidama)
