= Ethiopian Coffee SC =

Association football club in Ethiopia

Ethiopian Coffee
- Full name: Ethiopian Coffee Sport Club
- Nicknames: ንጋት ኮከብ (Morning Star) ቡና ገበያ (Coffee Market)
- Short name: Bunna
- Founded: 1976; 50 years ago
- Ground: Addis Ababa Stadium
- Capacity: 20,000
- Owner: Supporter owned
- Chairman: Meto Aleka Fekade Mamo(Chento)
- Manager: Gebremedhin Haile
- League: Ethiopian Premier League
- 2025–26: 8th of 18
Home colours	Away colours	Third colours

Ethiopian Coffee Sport Club (Amharic: የኢትዮጵያ ቡና ስፖርት ክለብ), otherwise known as Ethiopian Bunna, is a professional Ethiopian football club based in Addis Ababa.

They are a member of the Ethiopian Football Federation and play in the top division of Ethiopian Football, the Ethiopian Premier League. Their home stadium is Addis Ababa Stadium. Along with rivals Saint George, it boasts one of the largest fan bases in Ethiopia.

== History ==
=== Foundation (1976–1983) ===
Ethiopian Coffee Sport Club has its origins in 1976, when the employees of Kefa Coffee Processing decided to establish a football club. After gathering the required number of players, the club was registered as Coffee Board Sport Club on the kebele level in order to take part in local tournaments. The club then moved to playing in the AEWA Factory workers Association level, the third division of Ethiopian football at the time. Funded largely by the Kefa factory workers at the time, the club offered its players employment at the factory as an incentive to keep them at the club. As a result, players would work the morning shift at the factory and then play football in the evenings. Thus, the first official name of the club became, "Yenegat Kokebe" (lit. 'Morning Star') in reference to early raising factory workers who were also part-time footballers.

The clubs second name was "Yebuna Gebeya (Coffee Market) Sport Club". The club won four trophies and one fair play award during its first 6 years.

=== Restructure (1983–1997) ===
In 1984, the Addis Ababa Sports council was created in an effort to reorganize clubs in the city. As a result, the club officially changed its name to Ethiopian Coffee Sports Club under the management of the National Coffee Trading Corporation, then a government enterprise. For the next ten years the club would stagnate in the second division of Ethiopian football.

In 1994, with better financial backing, the club was able to sign top talents like Million Begashaw from Maritime and Mengistu Bogale from Berta S.C. These new signings helped the club earn promotion to the first division by virtue of winning the second division. In 1995, the club was restructured with financial support coming from the Ethiopian coffee exporters and by its steadily growing supporters.

=== First league title (1997–2010) ===
The club won the first division title for the first time in its history in the 1996–97 season. By virtue of winning their first title, the club represented Ethiopia in the 1998 CAF Champions League. That same year, Aseged Tesfaye became the first player In CAF Champions League history to score five goals in a single match against St. Michel United FC (Seychelles) in an 8–2 preliminary round win. Tesfaye's record still holds to date.

=== Return to glory (2010–2013) ===
Ethiopian Coffee were triumphant in their 2010–11 campaign, winning the Ethiopian Premier League Title. The club had to defeat Muger Cement F.C. on the last match day to secure its first Premier league title (second top division title).

=== A new approach (2013–present) ===
In a 2016 meeting with supporters, long time club chairman LT. Fekade Mamo stated the main priority of the club was not competing for a league title, but rather survival in the top division. At the start of the 2017–18 Season the team hired Serbian manager Kostadin Papic to a two-year contract. One month into his stay as manager, the club and Papic decided to mutually part ways after it was determined that his health condition wouldn't allow him to cope with the demands of the job. In December 2017 the club hired Frenchman Didier Gomes Da Rosa as their new manager, replacing Papic.

"Though until recently considered arch rival to the nation's oldest, richest and most popular club, Saint George," noted a writer for the Addis Ababa Capital, "Coffee in the past couple of years faced high financial constraints hardly able to sign big name players. The result has been a decade existence never winning the premier league."

== Colors and badge ==
The Ethiopian Coffee logo has gone through some changes since the club's inception in the mid 70's. While the emphasis on the traditional coffee pot is present in previous logos, the vibrant maroon and gold colors in the current logo are what give the club its identity. The club's ultras are known to wave large strips of maroon and gold flags at matches.

Kit Suppliers and Shirt Sponsors
Period	Kit manufacturer	Shirt Sponsor (chest)
		Meta Abo (Brewery)
Worbek
2011–2018		Habesha Breweries
2018–	Erreà	Habesha Breweries

== Stadium ==
Yidnekachew Tessema Stadium
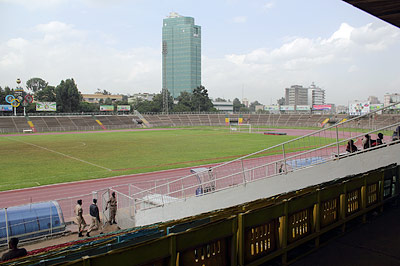
- Full name: Yidnekachew Tessema Stadium
- Former names: Haile Selassie Stadium
- Location: Addis Ababa, Ethiopia
- Capacity: 35,000
- Surface: Grass

Construction
- Opened: 1940
- Renovated: 1960, 1999, 2022

Tenants
- Ethiopia national football team Saint George S.C. Ethiopian Coffee S.C. Defence Force S.C.

Ethiopian Coffee has historically played at Yidnekachew Tessema Stadium, also known as Addis Ababa Stadium. The ground is shared with other football clubs based in Addis Ababa and is also used as an athletics venue for track and field competitions.

The ground has witness many occasions of violence in recent years between different sets of supporters including that of Ethiopian Coffee. Consequently, the Ethiopian Football Federation has handed down hefty monetary punishments and on some occasions banned supporters from stadiums for a certain number of matches.

The board of governors of Ethiopian Coffee have previously announced their intention to build their own ground in Addis Ababa.

== Ownership and finances ==
=== Sponsors ===
In 2000, Ethiopian Coffee signed a sponsorship deal with a local car dealership, Ultimate Motors. In December 2008 The Ethiopia Commodity Exchange (ECX) bought a partial stake in the club. That same year, Meta Abo Brewery signed a three-year sponsorship contract, which was expected to help the struggling football club. In 2011, the club signed a shirt sponsorship deal with Habesha Breweries, their third ever sponsorship deal following Worbek and Meta Abo Brewery. In 2018, the club signed a deal making the Italian sportswear company Erreà its official kit manufacturer.

== Academy ==
The club has an Under 17 (U17) and Under 20 (U20) football team.

== Support ==
Ethiopian Coffee arguably have Ethiopia's largest football fan base. According to the team's official fan club, it boasts over 18,000 registered members from around the country. However, as a result clashes between these two sets of supporters, usually ultras, are very common especially when the two teams go head to head in the "Sheger Derby".

The club's supporters have been involved in some incidents of football hooliganism. A 2016 incident at Hawassa Stadium saw Ethiopian Coffee supporters clash with rival fans and police, resulting in supporters storming the pitch.

== Honors ==
=== Domestic ===
==== League ====
- First Division/Ethiopian Premier League: 2

1997, 2011

- Ethiopian Run Away League: 1

2007

==== Cups ====
- Ethiopian Cup: 6

1988, 1998, 2000, 2003, 2008, 2024

- Ethiopian Super Cup: 4

1997, 2000, 2008, 2010

- Addis Ababa City Cup: 3

2004, 2012, 2018

=== African ===
- CAF Champions League: 2 appearances

1998 – Second Round
2012 – First Round

- CAF Confederations Cup: 2 appearances

2004 – Preliminary Round
2022 – First Round

- CAF Cup Winners' Cup: 3 appearances

1999 – First Round
2000 – Second Round
2001 – Second round

== Players ==
=== First-team squad ===
As of 12 September 2024

Note: Flags indicate national team as defined under FIFA eligibility rules; some limited exceptions apply. Players may hold more than one non-FIFA nationality.

No.	Pos.	Nation	Player
1	GK	ETH	Bereket Amare (captain)
2	DF	ETH	Abebe Tilahun
3	DF	ETH	Ramkel James
5	MF	ETH	Abdulhafiz Tofik
6	MF	NGR	Divine Nwachukwu
7	FW	ETH	Chala Teshita
8	MF	ETH	Amanuel Yohannes
9	FW	ETH	Mohammed-Nur Nassir
10	FW	ETH	Biruk Beyene
13	FW	ETH	Mogus tesema
14	MF	ETH	Abdulkerim Worku
15	MF	ETH	Redwan Nassir
16	MF	ETH	Ermiyas Shumbeza
17	FW	ETH	Mesfin Tafesse

No.	Pos.	Nation	Player
18	MF	ETH	Melaku Ayele
19	FW	ETH	Anteneh Tefera
20	FW	UGA	Geoffrey Wasswa
21	DF	ETH	Woldeamanuel Getu
22	GK	ETH	Israel Mesfin
23	DF	ETH	Gezahegn Desalegn
24	DF	ETH	Zenebe Kedir
25	GK	ETH	Dawit Bahiru
26	MF	ETH	Surafel Seifu
27	FW	UGA	Derrick Kakooza
28	MF	ETH	Kaleab Fiku
29	DF	ETH	Hailemichael Adefres
30	FW	ETH	Kedir Ali
32	DF	ETH	Kiyar Mohammed

=== Former players ===
Further Information: List of Ethiopian Coffee S.C. players

== Club officials ==
President: (Ethiopia) Aleka Fekade Mamo

CEO: (Ethiopia) Beyan Hussein

=== Coaching staff ===
As of 23 September 2023

- Team Leader: (Ethiopia) Zerihun Girma
- Manager/Head Coach: (Serbia) Nikola Kavazović
- First Assistant Coach: (Ethiopia) Gebrekidane Negash
- Second Assistant Coach: (Ethiopia) Zelalem Tsegaye
- First-team goalkeeping coach: (Ethiopia) Tsegazab Asegedom
- Team Doctor: (Ethiopia) Solomon Hailemariam
- Video analyst: Aaron Tariku

== Former managers ==
- (Ethiopia) Seyoum Abate
- (Ethiopia) Wubetu Abate
- (Ethiopia) Abraham Teklehimanot
- (Ethiopia) Kifle Boltena
- (Ethiopia) Anwar Yassin
- (Ethiopia) Paulos Getachew
- (Ethiopia) Abrham Berhane
- (Ethiopia) Sisay Zeleke
- (Ethiopia) Paulos Getachew
- (Ethiopia) Tsegaye Kidanemariam
- (Ethiopia) Tilahun Mengesha
- (Serbia) Dragan Popadić (2015–2016)
- (Serbia) Nebojša Vučićević (2016–2017)
- (Serbia) Kosta Papić (2017–2017)
- (France) Didier Gomes Da Rosa (2017–2018)
