= Hawassa City SC =

Association football club in Ethiopia

Hawassa City
- Full name: Hawassa Kenema Sport Club
- Nickname: The Lakers
- Founded: 1977 (1970 E.C.)
- Ground: Hawassa Kenema Stadium
- Capacity: 60,000
- Chairman: Tamiru Tafe
- Manager: Mulugeta Mihret
- League: Ethiopian Premier League
- 2024–25: Premier League 4th
Home colours	Away colours	Third colours

Hawassa City Sport Club (Amharic: ሀዋሳ ከተማ ስፖርት ክለብ), also known as Hawassa Kenema, is a professional Ethiopian football and basketball club based in Hawassa. The football team plays in the Ethiopian Premier League, the top division in Ethiopian football.

== History ==
Hawassa lifted the trophy in the 2003–04 season beating Lideta Nyala SC, and picked up the Ethiopian cup in the following season. Zelalem Shiferaw was the manager of the team. The club delivered its second Premier League title in the 2006–07 Season.

Hawassa Kenema participated in the 2005 and 2008 CAF Champions League, getting knocked out at the preliminary round each time. They made one appearance in the CAF Confederations Cup (2006), another tournament which they also exited in the preliminary round.

Ghanaian defender Lawrence Lartey joined Hawassa Kenema SC on a one-year contract in October 2017.

In November 2016, at beginning of the 2016–17 season, goalkeeper Kibreab Dawit along with his two children died due to an accident at his home in Hawassa. Kibreab Dawit was the second choice goalkeeper at the time and managed 6 starts since the start of the 2014–15 season.

During the 2017–18 season the team fired its head coach Wubetu Abate, his assistant Zelalem Shiferaw served as interim coach until the end of the season.

On August 5, 2018, the club announced that had agreed to a two-year contract with Addise Kassa, formerly the manager of Welkite City FC, to become the next head coach of the club.

== Stadium ==
Their home stadium is Hawassa Stadium which they share with another team, Debub Police S.C.

== Academy ==
Hawassa City S.C. is recognized for developing notable young football talent in Ethiopia, including Adane Girma, Shimelis Bekele, Bahaylu Assefa, and Mulugeta Mihret. The club is regarded as having successful youth academies, with its under-17 and under-20 teams winning multiple titles in their respective leagues.

Hawassa Kenema's U-17 team won the 2016–17 U-17 Ethiopian Premier League title for the second year in a row.

Temesgen Dana coached the U17 team until the end of the 2015–16 season and the U20 team from 2016 to 2018 before being promoted to assistant coach of the senior team in August 2018.

== Departments ==
The Hawassa City Women's football club plays in the Ethiopian Women's Premier League.

=== Active departments ===
- Women's Football Team
- Football Team (U20)

== Honors ==
=== Domestic ===
- Ethiopian Premier League: 2

2004, 2007

- Ethiopian Cup: 1

2005

=== African ===
- CAF Champions League: 2 appearances

2005 – Preliminary Round
2008 – Preliminary Round

- CAF Confederation Cup: 1 appearance

2006 – Preliminary Round

- CAF Cup: 1 appearance

2000 – Second Round

== Players ==
=== First-team squad ===
As of 8 January 2021

Note: Flags indicate national team as defined under FIFA eligibility rules; some limited exceptions apply. Players may hold more than one non-FIFA nationality.

No.	Pos.	Nation	Player
1	GK	GHA	Mohammed Muntari Tagoe
2	DF	ETH	Zenebe Kedir
3	MF	ETH	Ephrem Zekarias
4	DF	ETH	Tsega'ab Yohannes
5	MF	ETH	Gabriel Ahmed
6	DF	ETH	Addisalem Tesfaye
7	DF	ETH	Daniel Deribe
8	MF	ETH	Zelalem Isaias
9	FW	ETH	Habtamu Mekonnen
10	FW	ETH	Addisu Attule
11	MF	ETH	Chernet Awush
12	FW	ETH	Diruk Elias
13	MF	ETH	Abayneh Fino
14	MF	ETH	Birhanu Bekele
15	MF	ETH	Abenezer Yohannes

No.	Pos.	Nation	Player
17	FW	ETH	Mujib Kassim
18	MF	ETH	Dawit Taddese
19	MF	ETH	Yohnnes Segebo
20	FW	ETH	Tebarek Hefamo
21	FW	ETH	Ephrem Ashamo
22	GK	ETH	Dagim Tefera
23	FW	ERI	Ali Sulieman
25	MF	ETH	Henok Dilbi
26	DF	ETH	Lawrence Lartey
27	DF	ETH	Mintesinot Indrias
28	DF	ETH	Wondmagegn Maereg
29	MF	ETH	Wondmagegn Hailu
30	GK	ETH	Alazar Markos
44	DF	ETH	Tsega'ab Yohannes
99	GK	ETH	Mintesinot Gimbo

== Club officials ==
=== Coaching staff ===
- Manager/Head Coach: (Ethiopia) Mulugeta Mihret

== Former players ==
- (Ethiopia) Behailu Demeke

== Former managers ==
- (Ethiopia) Wubetu Abate
- (Ethiopia) Zelalem Shiferaw (as interim coach)
- (Ethiopia) Addise Kassa
- (Ethiopia) Kemal Ahmed
