= Defence Force SC =

Association football club in Ethiopia

Defence Force
- Full name: Mechal Sport Club
- Nickname: TORU
- Founded: 1938; 88 years ago
- Ground: Addis Ababa Stadium
- Capacity: 20,000
- Chairman: Ato Emanuel Fentahun
- Manager: Yohannes Sahle
- League: Ethiopian Premier League
- 2025–26: 3rd
- Website: https://mechalsportclub.com/
Home colours	Away colours

Mechal Sport Club (Amharic: መከላከያ Mekelakeya), officially known as Defence Force Sport Club, is an Ethiopian professional football club based in the city of Addis Ababa. They play in the Betking Ethiopian Premier League, the first division of professional football in Ethiopia. The team, formerly named Army SC and Mechal SC, is the second most decorated club in Ethiopian football history behind Saint George.

== History ==
Mekelakeya is historically the second most successful club in Ethiopian football history with 11 top division titles, with the most recent coming in 1989. Their dominance in the early years of Ethiopian football was cemented with six titles in the span of eight years from 1949 to 1956. After relative dormancy in the 1960s and 1970s, the club returned to its dominant ways in the 1980s by winning four titles. The club also has enjoyed success in the Ethiopian Cup, winning it 13 times. Defense beat Hawassa City 2–0 to win the 2015 Ethiopian Cup for a record 13th time and for the second time in three years.

Defense entered the 2017 CAF Confederation Cup as the runners-up in the 2016 Ethiopian Cup. They were knocked out of the tournament by Cameroonian side Yong Sports Academy 2–1 on aggregate in the preliminary round. On April 30, 2018, the club was involved in a match where they were awarded a goal that their opponents, Welwalo Adigrat University, disputed. An altercation followed that ultimately led to a member of the Welwalo coaching staff physically attacking the referee. In April 2021, the club was promoted back into the Ethiopian Premier League after a successful campaign in the second division.

== Crest ==
logo

== Stadium ==
The club plays its home matches at Addis Ababa Stadium.

== Departments ==
=== Active departments ===
- Women's Football Team
- Football Team (U17)
- Football Team (U20)

== Honors ==
=== Domestic ===
- Ethiopian Premier League: 11

1949, 1951, 1952, 1953, 1954, 1956, 1976, 1982, 1984, 1988, 1989

- Ethiopian Cup: 14

1946, 1949, 1950, 1951, 1954, 1955, 1956, 1975, 1982, 1990, 2006, 2013, 2015, 2018

=== African ===
- African Cup of Champions Clubs: 1 appearance

1977 – First Round

- CAF Confederation Cup: 2 appearances

2007 – First Round
2017 – Preliminary Round

- CAF Cup Winners' Cup: 1 appearance

1976 – Quarter-finals

== Players ==
=== First-team squad ===
Note: Flags indicate national team as defined under FIFA eligibility rules; some limited exceptions apply. Players may hold more than one non-FIFA nationality.

No.	Pos.	Nation	Player
1	GK	ETH	Teklemariam Shanko
2	DF	ETH	Ibrahim Hussein
13	DF	ETH	Abebe Tilahun
16	DF	ETH	Adisu Tesfaye
3	DF	ETH	Alemneh Girma
10	DF	ETH	Mintesnot Kebede
2	DF	ETH	Shemeles Tegegn
—	MF	ETH	Kenean Markneh
8	MF	ETH	Amanuel Yohannes
0	MF	ETH	Amanuel Teshome
25	MF	ETH	Behaylu Girma
17	MF	ETH	Firew Solomon
19	MF	ETH	Samuel Taye(captain)
—		ETH	Zacharias Fekre
—		ETH	Hailu Girma
—			Solomon David
—			Al-Hassan Nuhu
—			Mohammed Adulahi

No.	Pos.	Nation	Player
—	MF	ETH	Solomon Melkie
15	MF	ETH	Tewodros Tafesse
—	MF	ETH	Werkneh Dawit
24	FW	ETH	Eklesyas Girma
23	FW	ETH	Fikadu Alemu
27	FW	ETH	Fitsum Gebremariam
—	FW	ETH	Minyilu Wondimu
9	FW	ETH	Temesgen Gebrekidan
—	DF	ETH	Semere Aregaw
—	DF	ETH	Abnet Yigletu
—	GK	ETH	Yidnekachew Kidane Beyene
—	DF	ETH	Muluken Desalegn Degu
—	FW	GHA	Ernest Barfo
—	MF	ETH	Samuel Saliso
—		ETH	Dawit Mamo

== Former managers ==
- (Ethiopia) Geberemedhin Haile

== Former players ==
- (Ethiopia) Awol Abdellah
- (Ethiopia) Bedaso Hora
- (Ethiopia) Seyoum Kebede
- (Ethiopia) Faud Ibrahim
