= List of Ethiopian Premier League clubs =

The following is a list of clubs who have played in the Ethiopian Premier League since its formation in 1997 (1990 E.C.) to the current season.

== Table ==
As of the 2020-21 Season

Club	Location	Total seasons	Most recent relegation
Adama City	Adama		2012-13
Addis Abeba City F.C.	Addis Abeba		2016–17
Air Force FC	Debre Zeit		2011-12
Arba Minch City	Arba Minch		2017–18
Arba Minch Textile	Arba Minch		2004-05
Bahir Dar Kenema	Bahir Dar		N/A
Berhanena Selam FC	Addis Abeba		2002-03
Dashen Beer FC	Gonder		2015-16
Debub Police	Hawassa		2018–19
Dedebit	Addis Abeba/ Mekelle		2018–19
Defence Force	Addis Abeba	21	2018–19
Dire Dawa City	Dire Dawa		2011-12
Dire Dawa Railway	Dire Dawa		2002-03
Dire Dawa Textiles	Dire Dawa		1999-00
Ethio Electric S.C.	Addis Abeba	20	2017–18
Ethiopia Coffee	Addis Abeba	22	N/A
Ethiopian Medhin	Addis Abeba		2013-14
Ethiopia Nigd Bank (CBE SA)	Addis Abeba		2016–17
Fasil City	Gonder		N/A
Fincha Sugar	Fincha'a		2010-11
Guna Trading FC	Mekelle		2001-02
Hadiya Hossana	Hossana		2015-16
Harar Beer (Harar City)	Harar		2013-14
Hawassa City	Hawassa		N/A
Jimma Aba Buna F.C.	Jimma		2016–17
Jimma Aba Jifar	Jimma	4	N/A
Kombolcha Textiles	Dessie		2000-01
Lideta Nyala/ Nyala S.C.	Addis Abeba		2010-11
Mekelle 70 Enderta	Mekelle		N/A
Meta Abo Brewery			2009-10
Metehara Sugar	Addis Abeba		2009-10
Muger Cemento	Wonji		2014-15
Saint George	Addis Abeba	22	N/A
Sebeta City	Sebeta	2	N/A
Shashemene City	Shashemane		
Shire Endaselassie	Shire		N/A
Sidama Coffee	Hawassa		N/A
Tikur Abay Transport	Dessie		N/A
Trans Ethiopia	Mekelle		2010-11
Weha Serawoch			2012-13
Wolaita Dicha	Sodo		N/A
Wolaita Tussa	Sodo		N/A
Woldia S.C.	Woldia		2017–18
Wonji Sugar	Wenji Gefersa		2001-02
Welwalo Adigrat University	Adigrat		N/A
Wolkite City	Wolkite		N/A
