= List of Ethiopian football champions =

season	winner
1944	British Military Mission-BMME (Addis Abeba)
1945–47	no competition
1948	Key Baher (Addis Abeba)
1949	Army (Addis Abeba)
1950	Saint George SC (Addis Abeba)
1951	Army (Addis Abeba)
1952	Army (Addis Abeba)
1953	Army (Addis Abeba)
1954	Army (Addis Abeba)
1955	Hamassien (Asmara)
1956	Mechal (Addis Abeba)
1957	Hamassien (Asmara)
1958	Akale Guzay (Eritrea)
1959	Tele SC
1960	Cotton FC
1961	Ethio-Cement (Dire Dawa)
1962	Cotton FC
1963	Cotton FC
1964	Ethio-Cement (Dire Dawa)
1965	Cotton FC
1966	Saint George SC (Addis Abeba)
1967	Saint George SC (Addis Abeba)
1968	Saint George SC (Addis Abeba)
1969	Tele SC
1970	Tele SC
1971	Saint George SC (Addis Abeba)
1972	Asmara (Asmara)
1973	Asmara (Asmara)
1974	Embassoria (Eritrea)
1975	Saint George SC (Addis Abeba)
1976	Mechal (Addis Abeba)
1977	Medr Babur (Dire Dawa)
1978	Ogaden Anbassa (Harar)
1979	Omedla (Addis Abeba)
1980	Tegl Fre (Addis Abeba)
1981	Ermejachen (Addis Abeba)
1982	Mechal (Addis Abeba)
1983	Cotton FC
1984	Mechal (Addis Abeba)
1985	Brewery (Addis Abeba)
1986	Brewery (Addis Abeba)
1987	Saint George SC (Addis Abeba)
1988	Mechal (Addis Abeba)
1989	Mechal (Addis Abeba)
1990	Brewery (Addis Abeba)
1991	Saint George SC (Addis Abeba)
1992	Saint George SC (Addis Abeba)
1993	EEPCO (Addis Abeba)
1994	Saint George SC (Addis Abeba)
1995	Saint George SC (Addis Abeba)
1996	Saint George SC (Addis Abeba)
1997	Ethiopian Coffee (Addis Abeba)
1997–98	EEPCO (Addis Abeba)
1998–99	Saint George SC (Addis Abeba)
1999–00	Saint George SC (Addis Abeba)
2000–01	EEPCO (Addis Abeba)
2001–02	Saint George SC (Addis Abeba)
2002–03	Saint George SC (Addis Abeba)
2003–04	Awassa City (Awassa)
2004–05	Saint George SC (Addis Abeba)
2005–06	Saint George SC (Addis Abeba)
2006–07	Awassa City (Awassa)
2007-08	Saint George SC (Addis Abeba)
2008-09	Saint George SC (Addis Abeba)
2009-10	Saint George SC (Addis Abeba)
2010-11	Ethiopian Coffee (Addis Abeba)
2011-12	Saint George SC (Addis Abeba)
2012-13	Dedebit (Addis Abeba)
2013-14	Saint George SC (Addis Abeba)
2014-15	Saint George SC (Addis Abeba)
2015-16	Saint George SC (Addis Abeba)
2016-17	Saint George SC (Addis Abeba)
2017-18	Jimma Aba Jifar F.C. (Jimma)
2018-19	Mekelle 70 Enderta F.C. (Mekelle)
2019-20	Null and Void (COVID-19)
2020-21	Fassil kenema (Godar)
2021-22	Saint George SC (Addis Ababa)
2022-23	Saint George SC (Addis Ababa)
2023-24	Ethiopia Nigd Bank (Addis Ababa)
2024-25	Ethiopian Insurance FC (Addis Ababa)
2025-26	Sidama Coffee SC (Hawasa)
2026-27	
