= 2010–11 Ethiopian Premier League =

65th season of top-tier Ethiopian football

Ethiopian Premier League
- Season: 2010–11
- 2012 CAF Champions League: Ethiopian Coffee
- 2012 CAF Confederation Cup: St George (cup winner)
- Top goalscorer: Getaneh Kebede and Oumed Oukri 3 goals

The 2010–11 Ethiopian Premier League is the 65th season of the Ethiopian Premier League. The Ethiopian Premier League is the top association football division in Ethiopia, and comprises 16 clubs.

== Clubs ==
Locations of the Ethiopia Premier League 2010–11 teams
- Adama City FC
- Awassa City FC
- Banks SC
- Defence
- Dedebit
- Dire Dawa City
- EEPCO
- Ethiopian Coffee
- Ethiopian Insurance
- Harrar Beer Bottling FC
- Meta Abo Brewery
- Metehara Sugar
- Muger Cement
- Saint-George SA
- Sebeta City
- Sidama Coffee
- Southern Police
- Trans Ethiopia

=== League table ===
Pos	Team	Pld	W	D	L	GF	GA	GD	Pts	Qualification or relegation
1	Ethiopian Coffee (C)	30	17	10	3	52	28	+24	61	CAF Champions League 2012
2	St George	30	17	9	4	44	16	+28	60	CAF Confederation Cup 2012
3	Dedebit	30	18	4	8	62	29	+33	58	
4	Sidama Coffee	30	13	14	3	32	16	+16	53	
5	Defence Force	30	15	8	7	51	37	+14	53	
6	Awassa City	30	10	11	9	39	36	+3	41	
7	Adama City FC	30	10	9	11	29	39	−10	39	
8	Harrar Beer	30	8	14	8	28	26	+2	38	
9	Mugher Cement	30	10	7	13	24	30	−6	37	
10	EEPCO	30	9	9	12	35	35	0	36	
11	Ethiopian Banks	30	9	9	12	33	39	−6	36	
12	Dire Dawa City	30	10	6	14	25	41	−16	36	
13	Trans Ethiopia	30	9	8	13	29	40	−11	35	
14	Sebeta City	30	9	7	14	30	37	−7	34	
15	Lideta Nyala	30	5	7	18	29	55	−26	22	
16	Fincha Sugar (R)	30	0	10	20	14	52	−38	10	Relegation to Ethiopian Second Division

(C) Champions; (R) Relegated
