= 2022–23 Ethiopian Premier League =

77th season of top-tier Ethiopian football

Betking Ethiopian Premier League
- Season: 2022–23
- Dates: 30 September 2022 – 8 July 2023
- Champions: Saint George; 16th title
- Relegated: Arba Minch City; Legetafo Legedadi; Ethio Electric
- Top goalscorer: Ismaïl Ouro-Agoro (25 goals)
- Biggest away win: Ethiopian Insurance 1–7 Saint George
- Longest winning run: Saint George (3)
- Longest unbeaten run: Saint George (3)

The 2022–23 Ethiopian Premier League was the 77th season of the top-tier football league in Ethiopia, and the 24th season since it was renamed the Premier League. The season started on September 30, 2022, and ended on July 8, 2023. The league consisted of 16 teams. The most successful team in Ethiopian Premier League history is Saint George, who have won the title 29 times.

== Clubs ==
=== 2022–23 season ===
The following 16 clubs are competing in the Ethiopian Premier League during the 2022–23 season. For a list of winners of the Ethiopian Premier League since its inception, see List of Ethiopian football champions.

Club	Position 2019–20	Top Division		Location	Stadium	Capacity
Club	Position 2019–20	Titles	Last title			
Adama City	N/A	0	Never	Adama	Abebe Bikila Stadium	4,000
Legetafo Legedadi	N/A	0	Never	Addis Ababa	Addis Ababa	35,000
Arba Minch	N/A	0	Never	Arba Minch	Arba Minch Stadium	5,000
Bahir Dar Kenema	N/A	0	Never	Bahir Dar	Bahir Dar Stadium	60,000
Dire Dawa City	N/A	0	Never	Dire Dawa	Dire Dawa	18,000
Ethiopian Coffee	2	2	2010–11	Addis Ababa	Addis Ababa	35,000
Fasil Kenema	1	1	2020–21	Gondar	Fasiledes	20,000
Hadiya Hossana	N/A	0	Never	Hossana	Abiy Hersamo Stadium	5,000
Hawassa City	N/A	2	2006–07	Hawassa	Hawassa Stadium	15,000
Ethiopian Insurance	N/A	1	2017–18	Addis Ababa	Addis Ababa	15,000
Mekelakeya	N/A	11	1988–89	Addis Ababa	Addis Ababa	35,000
Saint George	N/A	29	2021–22	Addis Ababa	Addis Ababa	35,000
Ethio Electric	N/A	0	Never	Addis Ababa	Addis Ababa	5,000
Sidama Coffee	N/A	0	Never	Hawassa	Hawassa Stadium	25,000
Wolaitta Dicha	N/A	0	Never	Wolaita Sodo	Sodo Stadium	30,000
Wolkite City	N/A	0	Never	Wolkite	Wolkite Stadium	1,500

=== 2021–22 season ===
- Champion: Saint George
- Relegated: Sebeta City, Jimma Aba Jifar, and Addis Ababa City
- Promoted: Ethio Electric, Legetafo Legedadi, and Ethiopian Insurance

== Table ==
Pos	Team	Pld	W	D	L	GF	GA	GD	Pts	Qualification or relegation
1	Saint George (C)	30	18	10	2	54	21	+33	64	Champions, Qualification to the 2023–24 CAF Champions League
2	Bahir Dar Kenema	30	17	9	4	51	30	+21	60	Qualification to the 2023–24 CAF Confederation Cup
3	Ethiopian Insurance	30	14	7	9	50	42	+8	49	
4	Ethiopian Coffee	30	10	13	7	38	32	+6	43	
5	Fasil Kenema	30	11	10	9	29	24	+5	43	
6	Hadiya Hossana	30	11	10	9	29	24	+5	43	
7	Hawassa City	30	10	12	8	34	32	+2	42	
8	Adama City	30	11	8	11	41	36	+5	41	
9	Mekelakeya	30	11	7	12	39	36	+3	40	
10	Dire Dawa City	30	11	7	12	42	47	−5	40	
11	Sidama Coffee	30	10	8	12	34	42	−8	38	
12	Wolaitta Dicha	30	8	13	9	25	27	−2	37	
13	Wolkite City	30	8	11	11	34	39	−5	35	
14	Arba Minch (R)	30	6	16	8	35	36	−1	34	Relegation
15	Legetafo Legedadi (R)	30	4	6	20	24	67	−43	18	Relegation
16	Ethio Electric (R)	30	2	9	19	27	51	−24	15	Relegation

Rules for classification: 1) points; 2) goal difference; 3) number of goals scored.
(C) Champions; (R) Relegated

== Top scorers ==
Rank	Player	Club	Goals
1	(Togo) Ismaïl Ouro-Agoro	Saint George	25
2	(Ethiopia) Temesgen Derese	Arba Minch	3
2	(Ethiopia) Mujib Kassim	Hawassa	3
2	(Ethiopia) Getaneh Kebede	Wolkite	3
2	(Ethiopia) Dawa Hotessa	Adama	3
6	(Ethiopia) Fikadu Alemu	Fasil Kenema	2
6	(Ghana) Edwin Frimpong	Saint George	2
6	(Ethiopia) Ame Mohammed	Adama	2
6	(Ethiopia) Biruk Mulugeta		2
6	(Ethiopia) Fuad Fereja	Bahir Dar	2
