= 2024–25 Ethiopian Premier League =

79th season of top-tier Ethiopian football

BetKing Ethiopian Premier League
- Season: 2024–25
- Dates: 20 September 2024 – 8 July 2025

The 2024–25 Ethiopian Premier League (known as the BetKing Ethiopian Premier League for sponsorship reasons) was the 26th season of the Ethiopian Premier League, and the 79th season of top-division football in Ethiopia. The season started on 20 September 2024, and scheduled to conclude on 8 July 2025.

On 29 September, Wolkite City were kicked out due to the inability to fulfil the minimum requirements of club licensing.

== Clubs ==
=== Changes from previous season ===
▲ Promoted from 2023–24 Higher League	▼ Relegated to 2024–25 Higher League
Arba Minch City; Mekelle 70 Enderta; Shire Endaselassie; Welwalo Adigrat University	Wolkite City; Shashemene City; Hambericho Durame

=== Stadium and locations ===
Locations of the 2024–25 Ethiopian Premier League teams

Team	Location	Stadium	Capacity
Adama Kanema	Adama	Adama Stadium	4,000
Arbaminch Kanema	Arba Minch	Arba Minch Stadium	5,000
Bahir Dar City	Bahir Dar	Bahir Dar Stadium	52,000
Commercial Bank of Ethiopia	Addis Ababa	Addis Ababa Stadium	20,000
Dire Dawa Kanema	Dire Dawa	Dire Dawa Stadium	25,000
Ethiopian Coffee	Addis Ababa	Addis Ababa Stadium	20,000
Ethiopian Medhin	Addis Ababa	Addis Ababa Stadium	20,000
Fasil Kenema	Gondar	Fasiledes Stadium	20,000
Hadiya Hossana	Hosaena	Abiy Hersamo Stadium	5,000
Hawassa City	Hawassa	Hawassa Kenema Stadium	60,000
Mebrat Hail	Addis Ababa	Mebrat Hail Stadium	8,000
Mekelakeya	Addis Ababa	Addis Ababa Stadium	20,000
Mekelle 70 Enderta	Mekelle	Tigray Stadium	60,000
Saint George	Addis Ababa	Addis Ababa Stadium	20,000
Shire Endaselassie	Mekelle	Tigray Stadium	60,000
Sidama Coffee	Hawassa	Hawassa Kenema Stadium	60,000
Welwalo Adigrat University	Adigrat	Wolwalo Stadium	10,000
Wolaitta Dicha	Sodo	Sodo Stadium	30,000

== League table ==
Pos	Team	Pld	W	D	L	GF	GA	GD	Pts	Promotion or relegation
1	Ethiopian Insurance (C)	34	22	7	5	49	15	+34	73	Qualification for CAF Champions League first qualifying round
2	Ethiopian Coffee	34	17	9	8	32	18	+14	60	
3	Bahir Dar City	34	15	9	10	40	24	+16	54	
4	Hawassa City	34	14	11	9	40	31	+9	53	
5	Sidama Coffee	34	12	13	9	27	28	−1	49	
6	Wolaitta Dicha (Q)	34	13	9	12	34	38	−4	48	Qualification for Confederation Cup first qualifying round
7	Hadiya Hossana	34	12	11	11	32	31	+1	47	
8	Arbaminch Kanema	34	13	8	13	32	31	+1	47	
9	Saint George	34	12	10	12	30	30	0	46	
10	Mechal SC	34	10	15	9	36	32	+4	45	
11	CBE SA	34	10	14	10	34	34	0	44	
12	Ethio Electric	34	11	11	12	27	28	−1	44	
13	Dire Dawa Kenema	34	10	13	11	34	36	−2	43	
14	Fasil Kenema	34	9	16	9	33	35	−2	43	
15	Mekelle 70 Enderta	34	10	11	13	27	36	−9	41	
16	Adama Kanema	34	10	9	15	34	45	−11	39	
17	Shire Endaselassie (R)	34	3	13	18	22	46	−24	22	Relegation to Higher League
18	Welwalo Adigrat University (R)	34	2	13	19	21	46	−25	19	Relegation to Higher League

Source: Supersport
Rules for classification: 1) Points; 2) Head-to-head points; 3) Head-to-head goal difference; 4) Head-to-head goals scored; 5) Goal difference; 6) Goals scored.
(C) Champions; (Q) Qualified for the phase indicated; (R) Relegated

== Results ==
Home \ Away	ADK	AMK	BDC	CBE	DDK	ETC	ETM	FSK	HAD	HWC	MEB	MEK	M70	STG	SHE	SDC	WAU	WLD
Adama Kanema					1–3	2–1	0–2	1–1		2–0		0–2		1–2	2–3	0–0	1–1	
Arbaminch Kanema	2–0		1–0		1–2						2–0				0–0		2–0	
Bahir Dar City	0–1			3–0				2–1	2–0					0–0	0–0	2–0		0–0
Commercial Bank of Ethiopia		3–1					1–1	1–1		2–0	1–0			2–3		2–1		
Dire Dawa Kenema	1–1			0–0		0–0	0–3		0–1		0–2					3–1		4–1
Ethiopian Coffee								1–0		3–1	0–0		2–0		1–1	0–1	0–0	
Ethiopian Medhin	3–1	0–0		2–1				0–1			0–0		4–0				1–0	
Fasil Kenema		0–1			0–1						2–3		1–1	2–1	0–0		1–0	
Hadiya Hossana	2–0		0–1			1–0		1–1		1–2			0–2	1–0		3–2		0–1
Hawassa City		0–1	0–1	2–1	0–1		1–2				1–2		0–0		1–1			1–0
Mebrat Hail		2–1	1–0		0–0		0–2		0–0			1–1						2–3
Mechal SC	2–0	1–0		1–0			0–0									1–2		3–1
Mekelle 70 Enderta			1–1		3–2				0–1			1–1					1–0	
Saint George		1–0		0–1			0–0	1–2	0–0				0–1		1–0		2–1	
Shire Endaselassie			0–2		1–1				0–1		0–0		1–0				1–0	1–1
Sidama Coffee	0–0		1–0	1–1		2–0	1–0	0–1					0–0	0–0				
Welwalo Adigrat University			0–1	1–2			1–1	1–2				0–3		1–3	1–1	0–1		0–2
Wolaitta Dicha	2–2			1–1		2–1	1–2	1–1	1–3	1–1			1–0		1–0		1–0	

Updated to match(es) played on 30 April 2025. Source: SuperSport
Legend: Blue = home team win; Yellow = draw; Red = away team win.

== Attendances ==
#	Football club	Average attendance
1	Ethiopian Coffee	5,482
2	St. George	3,244
3	Bahir Dar	684
4	Ethiopian Insurance	522
5	Hawassa	416
6	Dire Dawa	389
7	Mekelakeya	361
8	Sidama Coffee	344
9	Wolaitta Dicha	311
10	Hadiya Hossana	284
11	Adama	266
12	Mekelle 70 Enderta	242
13	Arba Minch	218
14	Fasil	207
15	CBE SA	164
16	Ethio Electric	149
17	Welwalo	138
18	Shire Endaselassie	104
