= 2008–09 Ethiopian Premier League =

63rd season of top-tier Ethiopian football

Ethiopian Premier League
- Season: 2008–09
- Champions: Saint-George SA
- Relegated: Nyala
- CAF Champions League: Saint-George SA (1st)
- CAF Confederation Cup: Banks SC (4th)
- Top goalscorer: Salah Deen Said (Saint-George SA)

The 2008–09 Ethiopian Premier League is the 63rd season of the Ethiopian Premier League since its establishment in 1944. A total of 16 teams are contesting the league, with Saint-George SA the defending champions for the twenty-second time in total. The Ethiopian season began on 22 November 2008 and finished on .

== Table and results ==
=== League table ===
Pos	Team	Pld	W	D	L	GF	GA	GD	Pts	Qualification or relegation
1	Saint-George SA (C)	30	15	12	3	45	23	+22	57	CAF Champions League 2010
2	Ethiopian Coffee	30	14	7	9	50	35	+15	49	
3	Defence	30	13	10	7	44	33	+11	49	
4	Banks SC	30	11	12	7	46	38	+8	45	CAF Confederation Cup 2010
5	Hawassa City	30	11	11	8	35	31	+4	44	
6	Harrar Beer Botling FC	30	11	10	9	28	23	+5	43	
7	Muger Cement	30	10	12	8	33	30	+3	42	
8	Southern Police	30	9	11	10	38	31	+7	38	
9	Ethiopian Insurance	30	8	14	8	27	24	+3	38	
10	Adama City FC	30	6	18	6	23	22	+1	36	
11	Dire Dawa City	30	10	6	14	30	35	−5	36	
12	Sebeta City	30	7	14	9	18	27	−9	35	
13	EEPCO	30	7	13	10	36	34	+2	34	
14	Metehara Sugar	30	7	12	11	22	32	−10	33	
15	Trans Ethiopia	30	7	9	14	23	51	−28	30	
16	Nyala (R)	30	5	7	18	17	46	−29	22	Relegation to Ethiopian Second Division

(C) Champions; (R) Relegated

=== Teams and stadiums ===
Club	Location	Venue	Seating Capacity
Saint George FC	Addis Ababa	Addis Ababa Stadium	34,000
