= 2019–20 Ethiopian Premier League =

74th season of top-tier Ethiopian football

Ethiopian Premier League
- Season: 2019-20
- Champions: None awarded
- Relegated: None
- Top goalscorer: (Ethiopia) Mujib Kassim (14 goals)

The 2019–20 Ethiopian Premier League is the 74th season of top-tier football in Ethiopia (21st season as the Premier League). The season started in November 2019. The league was halted due to the COVID-19 pandemic and the results of matches already held were declared null and void.

== League table ==
Pos	Team	Pld	W	D	L	GF	GA	GD	Pts	Qualification or relegation
1	Saint George (C)	12	6	5	1	16	8	+8	23	Qualification for Champions League
2	Fasil City	12	6	4	2	19	8	+11	22	Qualification for Confederation Cup
3	Mekelle City	12	7	1	4	15	11	+4	22	
4	Shire Endaselassie	12	5	4	3	12	10	+2	19	
5	Sebeta	12	5	2	5	14	14	0	17	
6	Wolkite	12	5	2	5	8	8	0	17	
7	Bahir Dar City	12	5	2	5	18	20	−2	17	
8	Hawassa City	12	4	4	4	13	17	−4	16	
9	Sidama Coffee	12	5	0	7	23	21	+2	15	
10	Adama City	12	3	6	3	12	10	+2	15	
11	Wolayta Dicha	12	4	3	5	13	12	+1	15	
12	Welwalo Adigrat University	12	4	3	5	13	14	−1	15	
13	Jimma Aba Jifar	12	3	6	3	8	9	−1	15	
14	Ethiopian Coffee (R)	12	3	4	5	16	14	+2	13	Relegation to Ethiopian Super League
15	Dire Dawa City (R)	12	4	1	7	10	22	−12	13	Relegation to Ethiopian Super League
16	Hadiya Hossana (R)	12	2	3	7	10	22	−12	9	Relegation to Ethiopian Super League

Updated to match(es) played on 3 February 2020. Source: soccerethiopia.net
Rules for classification: 1) Points; 2) Goal difference; 3) Goals scored.
(C) Champions; (R) Relegated

== Top scorers ==
Rank	Player	Club	Goals
1	(Ethiopia) Mujib Kassim	Fasil Kenema	14
2	(Ethiopia) Fitsum Alemu	Bahir Dar	9
2	(Ethiopia) Habtamu	Sidama Coffee	9
2	(Ethiopia) Biruk Beyene	Hawassa	9
2	(Ethiopia) Adise Giday	Sidama Coffee	9
6	(Ethiopia) Baye Gezahagn	Wolaitta Dicha	8
6	(Ethiopia) Abubeker Nassir	Ethiopian Coffee	8
8	(Nigeria) Okiki Afolabi	Mekelle 70	7
8	(Ethiopia) Abel Yalew	Saint George	7
10	(Ghana) Richmond	Dire Dawa	6
