= 2021–22 Ethiopian Premier League =

76th season of top-tier Ethiopian football

Betking Ethiopian Premier League
- Season: 2021–22
- Dates: 17 October 2021 – 2 July 2022
- Champions: Saint George; 15th title
- Relegated: Sebeta City F.C., Jimma Aba Jifar F.C., Addis Ababa City F.C.
- Champions League: Saint George
- Confederation Cup: Fasil Kenema S.C.
- Matches played: 240
- Top goalscorer: (Ethiopia) Yigezu Bogale (16)
- Longest unbeaten run: (26 games); Saint George S.C.

The 2021–22 Ethiopian Premier League was the 76th season of top-tier football in Ethiopia (23rd season as the Premier League). The season started on October 17, 2021. The first round of matches were held at Hawassa stadium and Dire Dawa Stadium, while the second round of matches were held at Adama and Bahir dar Stadium.

== 2021-22 season ==
Locations of clubs participating in the 2021-22 Ethiopian Premier League

The following 16 clubs competing in the Ethiopian Premier League during the 2021–22 season.

Club	Position 2019-20	Top Division		Location	Stadium	Capacity
Club	Position 2019-20	Titles	Last title			
Adama City	N/A	0	Never	Adama	Abebe Bikila Stadium	4,000
Addis Ababa City	N/A	0	Never	Addis Abeba	Addis Abeba	35,000
Arba Minch	N/A	0	Never	Arba Minch	Arba Minch Stadium	5,000
Bahir Dar Kenema	N/A	0	Never	Bahir Dar	Bahir Dar Stadium	60,000
Dire Dawa City	N/A	0	Never	Dire Dawa	Dire Dawa	18,000
Ethiopian Coffee	2	2	2010-11	Addis Abeba	Addis Abeba	35,000
Fasil Kenema	1	1	2020-21	Gondar	Fasiledes	20,000
Hadiya Hossana	N/A	0	Never	Hossana	Abiy Hersamo Stadium	5,000
Hawassa City	N/A	2	2006-07	Hawassa	Hawassa Stadium	15,000
Jimma Aba Jifar	N/A	1	2017-18	Jimma	Jimma Stadium	15,000
Mekelakeya	N/A	11	1988-89	Addis Abeba	Addis Abeba	35,000
Saint George	N/A	29	2016-17	Addis Abeba	Addis Abeba	35,000
Sebeta City	N/A	0	Never	Sebeta	Sebeta Stadium	5,000
Sidama Coffee	N/A	0	Never	Hawassa	Hawassa Stadium	25,000
Wolaitta Dicha	N/A	0	Never	Wolaita Sodo	Sodo Stadium	30,000
Wolkite City	N/A	0	Never	Wolkite	Wolkite Stadium	1,500

== League table ==
Pos	Team	Pld	W	D	L	GF	GA	GD	Pts	Qualification or relegation
1	Saint George (C)	30	18	11	1	50	11	+39	65	Qualification for Champions League
2	Fasil City (Q)	30	18	7	5	49	23	+26	61	Qualification for Confederation Cup
3	Sidama Coffee	30	12	12	6	40	30	+10	48	
4	Hawassa City	30	13	6	11	38	38	0	45	
5	Wolayta Dicha	30	11	9	10	23	24	−1	42	
6	Ethiopian Coffee	30	11	9	10	29	37	−8	42	
7	Arba Minch	30	9	13	8	27	26	+1	40	
8	Wolkite	30	9	11	10	33	36	−3	38	
9	Defence Force	30	9	10	11	25	25	0	37	
10	Hadiya Hossana	30	8	13	9	36	40	−4	37	
11	Adama City	30	6	17	7	24	23	+1	35	
12	Bahir Dar City	30	8	11	11	29	29	0	35	
13	Dire Dawa City	30	8	9	13	28	40	−12	33	
14	Addis Ababa City (R)	30	7	11	12	37	42	−5	32	Relegation to Ethiopian Super League
15	Sebeta (R)	30	5	10	15	22	46	−24	25	Relegation to Ethiopian Super League
16	Jimma Aba Jifar (R)	30	6	5	19	23	43	−20	23	Relegation to Ethiopian Super League

Source: soccerethiopia.net
Rules for classification: 1) Points; 2) Goal difference; 3) Goals scored.
(C) Champions; (Q) Qualified for the phase indicated; (R) Relegated

== Top scorers ==
Rank	Player	Club	Goals
1	(Ethiopia) Yigezu Bogale	Sidama Coffee	16
2	(Ghana) Richmond	Addis Ababa	14
2	(Ethiopia) Biruk Beyene	Hawassa	14
2	(Ethiopia) Getaneh Kebede	Wolkite	14
2	(Ethiopia) Abubeker Nassir	Ethiopian Coffee	14
6	(Togo) Ismaïl Ouro-Agoro	Saint George	12
7	(Ethiopia) Henok Ayele	Dire Dawa	10
8	(Ethiopia) Fitsum Tilahun	Addis Ababa	9
9	(Nigeria) Okiki Afolabi	Fasil Kenema	8
9	(Ghana) Osei Mawuli	Wolaitta Dicha	8
