= 2011–12 Ethiopian Premier League =

66th season of top-tier Ethiopian football

Ethiopian Premier League
- Season: 2011–12
- Champions: Saint-George SA (25th title)
- Relegated: Air Force FC
- Champions League: Saint-George SA
- Confederation Cup: Dedebit
- Matches: 182
- Goals: 421 (2.31 per match)
- Biggest home win: Saint-George SA 7 – 0 Adama City FC
- Biggest away win: Muger Cement 0 – 5 Saint-George SA
- Highest scoring: Saint-George SA 7 – 0 Adama City FC

The 2011–12 Ethiopian Premier League is the 66th season of the Ethiopian Premier League since its establishment in 1944. A total of 14 teams are contesting the league.

== Clubs ==
Locations of the Ethiopia Premier League 2011–12 teams
- Adama City FC
- Air Force FC
- Arba Minch City FC
- Awassa City FC
- CBE SA (Addis Abeba)
- Dedebit (Addis Abeba)
- Defence (Addis Abeba)
- Dire Dawa City
- EEPCO (Addis Abeba)
- Ethiopian Coffee (Addis Abeba)
- Harrar Beer Botling FC
- Muger Cement (Oromiya)
- Saint-George SA (Addis Abeba)
- Sidama Coffee (Awassa)

== League table ==
Pos	Team	Pld	W	D	L	GF	GA	GD	Pts	Qualification or relegation
1	Kedus Giorgis	26	18	5	3	52	13	+39	59	2014 CAF Champions League
2	Dedebit	26	17	4	5	49	22	+27	55	2014 CAF Confederation Cup
3	Mebrat Hayl (EEPCO)	26	13	7	6	42	24	+18	46	
4	Muger Cemento	26	8	11	7	28	32	−4	35	
5	Ethiopia Bunna	26	9	7	10	42	42	0	34	
6	Ethiopia Nigd Bank (CBA SA)	26	7	13	6	30	31	−1	34	
7	Harar Bira	26	8	9	9	22	22	0	33	
8	Sidama Bunna	26	7	12	7	27	30	−3	33	
9	Mekelakeya	26	7	11	8	28	30	−2	32	
10	Arba Minch Kenema	26	8	8	10	25	35	−10	32	
11	Awassa Kenema	26	5	14	7	21	28	−7	29	
12	Adama Kenema	26	7	8	11	21	35	−14	29	
13	Dire Dawa Kenema	26	5	8	13	22	33	−11	23	Relegation to Ethiopian Second Division
14	Ayer Hayl	26	3	3	20	16	49	−33	12	Relegation to Ethiopian Second Division

Updated to match(es) played on 7 July 2012. Source:
Rules for classification: 1) points; 2) goal difference; 3) number of goals scored.
