= Football in Ethiopia =

International competitions
- Champions League; CAF Confederation Cup; Super Cup; FIFA Club World Cup; FIFA World Cup (National Team); Africa Cup of Nations (National Team)

Football is the most popular sport in Ethiopia, with around 40% of Ethiopians considered football fans. Although not one of the leading footballing nations in Africa, Ethiopia has produced some outstanding teams at both club and international level as well as some talented individual players.

== History ==
The Italians were the first to promote the football in Ethiopia, after 1937. No overall Ethiopian championship was played in 1938 and 1939, but there were regional leagues in the provinces of Amhara (capital Gondar), Harar (capital Harar), and Scioa (capital Addis Ababa).

The "Campo Sportivo "Littorio" was the first football stadium of Addis Abeba: successively it was enlarged in 1940 with tribune and athletic lanes and after WW2 was renamed Addis Ababa Stadium. In 1944 the first Ethiopian Championship was held in Addis Abeba under Haile Selassie rule, with 5 teams representing the various communities in the capital conquered by the Allies. In the final match the BMME of the British Army won the Fortitudo of the remaining Italian colonists. Participants: St. George (Ethiopian); BMME (British); Fortitudo (Italian); Ararat (Armenian); Olympiakos (Greek).

=== Early years ===
Football in Ethiopia came under the control of the Ethiopian Football Federation (EFF) when that organisation was founded in 1943. The EFF affiliated to FIFA in 1953 and to the Confederation of African Football in 1957. League football was in existence before the formation of the EFF with regional leagues contested during the 1938/39 and 1939/40 seasons in the provinces of Amhara, Eritrea, Galla-Sidamo, Harar, and Scioa as part of the Italian occupation.

The first recognized version of the Ethiopian Premier League was contested in 1944 when five teams representing the various communities of Addis Ababa competed for a title won by the British Military Mission-BMME. The Ethiopian Cup was added the following year and has been contested regularly since (albeit with some gaps, notably in the 1960s).

=== Contemporary football ===
The Ethiopian Premier League has been an annual competition since 1948 with Saint George emerging as the country's leading club with 24 titles.

Ethiopia was suspended by FIFA in 2008 after the Federal Parliamentary Assembly sacked Ashebir Woldegiorgis from his position as EFF President and replaced him with their candidate Ahmed Yasin. As a result, FIFA, who opposed government interference in football, suspended the country in July 2008. The suspension was lifted in July 2009 following the election of new EFF leaders.

| Level | League/Division(s) | |
|---|---|---|
| 1 Premier League | Ethiopian Premier League; 18 clubs | |
| 2 Ethiopian Higher League | Ethiopian Higher League; 20 clubs | |
| 3 Ethiopian League one | Zone A 14 clubs | Zone B 14 clubs |
| 4 Ethiopian League two | Zone A 14 clubs | Zone B 14 clubs |

== International ==
The Ethiopia national football team made its first appearance in 1947 and since then have enjoyed both highs and lows. As one of the few independent African states in the immediate aftermath of the Second World War Ethiopia were an important team in the development of the international football in the continent.

=== Africa Cup of Nations ===
Ethiopia was one of the pioneers of the Africa Cup of Nations and were one of only three teams to enter the inaugural 1957 tournament, finishing as runners-up to Egypt. They were also present at the 1959 tournament As hosts of the 1962 tournament and led by goalscorer Mengistu Worku, Ethiopia defeated Tunisia and the United Arab Republic (Egypt) to be crowned African champions for the only time in their history.

They hosted the tournament again in 1968 and 1976 but by then decline had set in and their next appearance in a finals tournament came in 1982. They returned in the 2013 African Cup of Nations but got knocked-out in the group stages with only one point and finished bottom of their group.

=== World Cup ===
Ethiopia has never qualified for the FIFA World Cup.

=== CECAFA ===
Ethiopia are also members of the Council for East and Central Africa Football Associations (CECAFA) and take part in its competitions. They first won the CECAFA Cup in 1987 as hosts and repeated the same triumph in 2001 and 2004 before adding a fourth title in Rwanda in 2005.

=== Other teams ===
In 2005 the Under-20s team won its sole CECAFA U-20 Championship.

=== Club football ===
No Ethiopian club side has ever won the CAF Champions League or any other international club competitions. The best performances were the semi-final places achieved by the Cotton Factory Club in 1964 and Saint George in 1967.

== Largest football stadiums in Ethiopia ==
| # | Stadium | Location | Capacity | Home team(s) | Notes |
|---|---|---|---|---|---|
| 1 | Bahir Dar Stadium | Bahir Dar | 60,000 | National team | |
| 2 | Tigray Stadium | Mekelle | 60,000 | Mekelle City FC, Dedebit FC, Guna Trading FC, Trans Ethiopia | |
| 3 | Awassa Kenema Stadium | Hawassa | 60,000 | Hawassa City F.C. | |

== Support ==
In 2015 the estimated number of fans for the most popular English Premier League club in Ethiopia was Manchester United, with 45% of Ethiopian Premier League fans following the club, followed by Arsenal (32%) and Chelsea (18%).

== Attendances ==
The average attendance per top-flight football league season and the club with the highest average attendance:

| Season | League average | Best club | Best club average |
|---|---|---|---|
| 2024-25 | 751 | Ethiopian Coffee | 5,482 |

Source: League page on Wikipedia

== See also ==
- List of football stadiums in Ethiopia
