= Adane Girma =

Ethiopian footballer (born 1985)

Personal information
- Date of birth: 25 June 1985 (age 41)
- Place of birth: Awassa, Sidama Region, Ethiopia
- Height: 1.83 m (6 ft 0 in)
- Position: Striker

Youth career
- –2004: Hawassa City

Senior career*
Years	Team	Apps	(Gls)
2004–2007	Hawassa City		
2007–2018	Saint George		
2018–2019	Hawassa City		(2)
2019–2021	Wolkite City		

International career
2004–2014	Ethiopia	45	(9)
- * Club domestic league appearances and goals

Adane Girma (Amharic: አዳነ ግርማ; born 25 June 1985) is an Ethiopian former professional footballer who played as a striker.

He was a member of the Ethiopia national team from 2004 to 2014 and scored 9 goals in 45 appearances.

== Club career ==
Adane began his career with Hawassa Kenema FC in summer 2007, then left the team and moved to Saint-George SA. He was later transformed to striker, a role in which he did very well by being one of the best scorers of the Ethiopian Premier League in the 2009–10 season. He can also play at full-back. Adane and Getaneh Kebede of Dedebit FC shared the 2010–11 Ethiopian Premier League goal scoring title after they finished the season with 20 goals each. He was also awarded as best player of the league in that season.

In 2018, Adane was let go by his long time club Saint George S.C. Soon after, Adane agreed to a contract with his former club Hawassa Kenema FC.

== International career ==
Adane was a key player for the Ethiopia national team during the qualification of the 2013 African Cup of Nations. On his first appearance of African Cup of Nations, Adane played at central midfielder position in place of another sensational young midfielder Addis Hintsa. Because of the more cautious approach to the first match against 2012 Champions Zambia, the Coach chose to play Adane in the central position, leaving Addis Hintsa on the bench. With great skill and short passing, Adane managed to lead the team to a draw. His team played with only 10-man for more than 70 minutes of the match. Shortly after the introduction of Addis Hintsa, Adane played in a more in attacking position. On the 65th minute, Adane would receive a great pass from the striker Saladin Said which he converted it to a magnificent low corner goal.

Adane was named to the Ethiopian squad for the 2013 Africa Cup of Nations. He scored the equalizer in team Ethiopia's first match against Zambia in the 2013 Africa Cup of Nations, in Nelspruit, South Africa.

Adane retired from the Ethiopian national team in 2015.

== Career statistics ==
Scores and results list Ethiopia's goal tally first, score column indicates score after each Adane goal.

List of international goals scored by Adane Girma
No.	Date	Venue	Opponent	Score	Result	Competition
1	22 June 2008	Addis Ababa, Ethiopia	Mauritania	6–1	6–1	2010 FIFA World Cup qualification
2	30 November 2009	Nairobi, Kenya	Djibouti	2–0	5–0	2009 CECAFA Cup
3	30 November 2009	Nairobi, Kenya	Djibouti	3–0	5–0	2009 CECAFA Cup
4	8 October 2011	Addis Ababa, Ethiopia	Madagascar	2–1	4–2	2012 CAF qualification
5	2 December 2011	Dar es Salaam, Tanzania	Malawi	1–0	1–1	2011 CECAFA Cup
6	17 June 2012	Cotonou, Benin	Benin	1–1	1–1	2013 Africa Cup of Nations qualification
7	8 September 2012	Khartoum, Sudan	Sudan	2–3	3–5	2013 Africa Cup of Nations qualification
8	14 October 2012	Addis Ababa, Ethiopia	Sudan	1–0	2–0	2013 Africa Cup of Nations qualification
9	21 January 2013	Nelspruit, South Africa	Zambia	1–1	1–1	2013 Africa Cup of Nations
