= Robert Odongkara =

Ugandan footballer (born 1989)

Personal information
- Date of birth: 2 September 1989 (age 37)
- Place of birth: Kitgum, Uganda
- Height: 1.83 m (6 ft 0 in)
- Position: Goalkeeper

Team information
- Current team: Horoya AC

Senior career*
Years	Team	Apps	(Gls)
2008–2010	Villa		
2010–2011	Uganda Revenue Authority		
2011–2018	Saint George		
2018–2019	Adama City		
2019–	Horoya AC		

International career^{‡}
2010–	Uganda	29	(0)
- * Club domestic league appearances and goals as of 10:22, 26 August 2019 (UTC) ‡ National team caps and goals as of 10:22, 26 August 2019 (UTC)

Robert Odongkara (born 2 September 1989) is a Ugandan international footballer who plays for Guinea club Horoya AC, as a goalkeeper.

== Career ==
Odongkara has played club football for Villa, Uganda Revenue Authority and Saint George.

In October 2018, Odongkara moved to Adama City in the Ethiopian Premier League after seven years with Saint George. In August 2019, Odongkara completed a move to Horoya AC on a two-year contract.

== International career ==
He made his international debut for Uganda in 2010, and has appeared in FIFA World Cup qualifying matches for them. He made one appearance at the 2017 Africa Cup of Nations, playing all ninety minutes of a 1–1 draw in the group stages with Mali.

== Career statistics ==
=== International ===
As of matches played on 15 August 2019

Uganda national team
Year	Apps	Goals
2010	9	0
2011	1	0
2012	0	0
2013	5	0
2014	6	0
2015	1	0
2016	3	0
2017	2	0
2018	0	0
2019	2	0
Total	29	0
