= Addis Ababa City Cup =

- Founded: 2004
- Region: Addis Ababa
- Current champions: Saint George S.C.
- Broadcaster: Addis TV
- 2017–18 Addis Ababa City Cup

The Addis Ababa City Cup (Amharic: አዲስ አበባ ከተማ ዋንጫ) is an annual knockout football competition in men's domestic Ethiopian Football. The tournament is organized by the Addis Ababa Football Federation. It is usually contested among the football clubs based in Addis Ababa with the exception of teams who enter the tournament by invitation.

== History ==
The final match of the 12th edition of the tournament between arch rivals Saint George and Ethiopian Coffee was, for the first time, transmitted live on ENN TV, a local private television network.

All the matches of the 13th edition (2018) of the tournament were broadcast on Walta TV. All the matches of the 2019 edition of the tournament were broadcast on Addis TV.

== Previous Winners ==
Club	Wins	Winning years
Saint George	5	2007, 2010, 2011, 2013, 2017, 2019
EEPCO	3	2005, 2006, 2016
Ethiopian Coffee	2	2004, 2012, 2018
CBE SA	1	2014

- 2004: Ethiopian Coffee S.C.
- 2005: EEPCO F.C. 0-0 Ethiopian Coffee S.C. [5-4 Pen.]
- 2006: EEPCO F.C.
- 2007: St. George S.C. 2-0 Insurance F.C.
- 2010: St. George S.C. 1-1 CBE SA [4-2 Pen.]
- 2011: St. George S.C. 1-0 Dedebit F.C.
- 2012: Ethiopian Coffee S.C. beat CBE SA on Penalties
- 2013: St. George S.C.
- 2014: CBE SA 1-1 Ethiopian Coffee S.C. [6-5 Pen.]
- 2015: Dashen Beer F.C.* defeated St. George S.C.
- 2016: EEPCO F.C. 2-0 St. George S.C.
- 2017: St. George S.C. 1-0 Ethiopian Coffee S.C.
- 2018: Ethiopian Coffee S.C. 4-1 Bahir Dar Kenema F.C.
- 2019: St. George S.C. 2-1 Sebeta Ketema

* As the one of two teams (along with Adama City) that entered the tournament via invitation, Dashen Beer were barred from lifting the actual trophy instead being presented with an alternate "special" trophy. The actual trophy was presented to the runners up, Saint George, as they were technically the best team from Addis Ababa in the tournament that year.
