= Medr Babur =

Association football club in Ethiopia

- Full name: Medr Babur
- Ground: Dire Dawa Stadium, Ethiopia
- Capacity: 18,000
- League: Ethiopian Premier League

Medr Babur is a football club from Ethiopia. They have played in the Ethiopian Premier League, but currently play in Ethiopian Second Division.

In 1977 the team were League champions.

In the 1978 African Cup of Champions Clubs they were knocked out in the first round by Al-Tahaddy of Libya.

== Honours ==
- Ethiopian Premier League: 1977

== Stadium ==
Currently the team plays at the Dire Dawa Stadium.
