= Okiki Afolabi =

Nigerian footballer (born 1994)

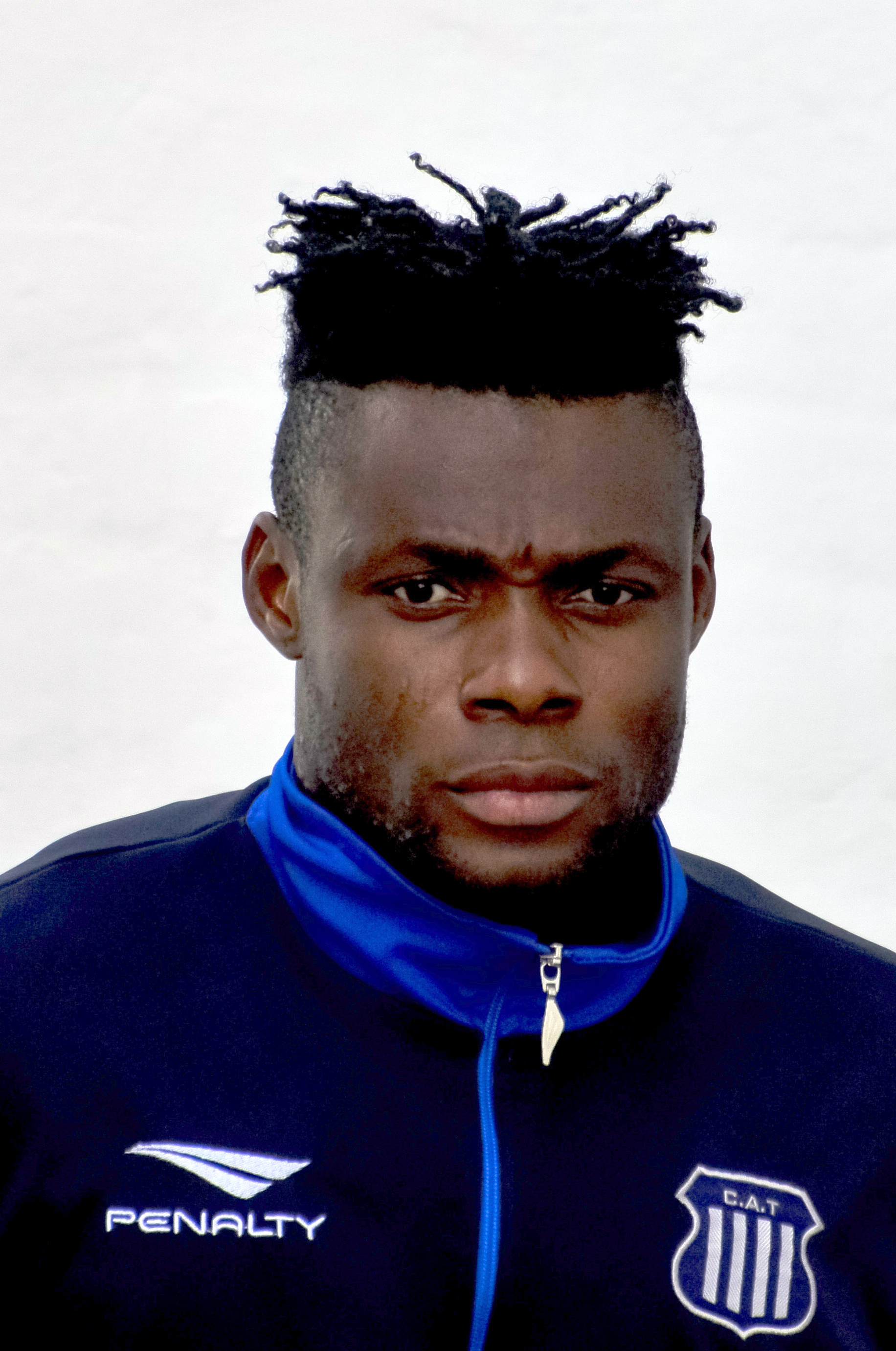

Personal information
- Full name: Okikiola Afolabi (Lelabi)
- Date of birth: 12 December 1994 (age 31)
- Place of birth: Ibadan, Nigeria
- Height: 1.92 m (6 ft 4 in)
- Position: Forward

Team information
- Current team: Al-Hurriya SC
- Number: 99

Youth career
- 2011-2014: Shooting Stars S.C.

Senior career*
Years	Team	Apps	(Gls)
2015–2016	Sunshine Stars	27	(13)
2016	Talleres	1	(0)
2017	Kelantan		
2017–2018	Jimma Aba Jifar	30	(23)
2018–2019	Ismaily SC	5	(0)
2019–2020	Jimma Aba Jifar	9	(8)
2020	Mekelle 70 Enderta	14	(10)
2020–2021	Sidama Coffee	10	(7)
2021–2022	Fasil Kenema	12	(10)
2022	Ahli Aleppo	7	(6)
2022–2023	Newroz Sport Club	14	(11)
2023–2024	Al-Naft	22	(17)
2024–2025	Naft Maysan	28	(10)
2025–2026	Al-Tadamon	5	(1)
- * Club domestic league appearances and goals

Okiki Afolabi (born 12 December 1994 in Ibadan) is a Nigerian professional footballer who plays as a forward. He was part of the U20 and U23 national teams.

== Biography ==
=== Sunshine Stars ===
He began his career at Sunshine Stars F.C. in the Nigeria Premier League, converting 13 goals in 27 games.

=== Argentina ===
In August 2016, Okiki was on trial with Racing Club in the Argentine Primera División. However, he decided to play for Talleres. He was signed for one year with a purchase option.

=== Jimma Aba Jifar ===
Afolabi signed for Ethiopian Premier League debutantes Jimma Aba Jifar F.C. at the start of the 2017–18 Ethiopian Premier League. He enjoyed a successful debut season as league's top goal scorer (23) and helping the club win its first ever title.

== Honours ==
Talleres de Córdoba

- Primera B Nacional: 2016

Jimma Aba Jifar

- Ethiopian Premier League: 2017–18
- Top scorer: 2017–18
