= Richmond Adongo =

Ghanaian footballer (born 1992)

Personal information
- Date of birth: 28 November 1992 (age 33)
- Place of birth: Accra, Ghana

Youth career
- Unistar Academy
- 2009–2010: IFK Göteborg

Senior career*
Years	Team	Apps	(Gls)
2010–2011	Liberty Professionals Accra	20	(13)
2011–2013	Amidaus Professionals	25	(11)
2013–2015	Berekum Chelsea FC	19	(12)
2015–2016	Saham Club	20	(10)
2016–2018	Buildcon		
2018–2019	Welwalo Adigrat University FC		
2019–	Dire Dawa City		

International career
	Ghana U20	8	(3)
- * Club domestic league appearances and goals

Richmond Roger Adongo (born 28 November 1992) is a Ghanaian professional footballer who plays as a forward for Ethiopian club Dire Dawa City.

== Early life ==
Adongo was born in Accra, Ghana. He was spotted at the age of 17 by recruiters from the Swedish club IFK Göteborg. He joined the club and stayed there one season.

After his European experience, he returned to Ghana to continue his career. He was released from Buildcon F.C., after which he joined Ethiopian side Welwalo Adigrat University F.C. in January 2018 on a one-year contract.

Adongo joined another Ethiopian side, Dire Dawa City, in October 2019. He extended his contract for an additional year in June 2020.

== Playing career ==
=== Club ===
Youth Career

- 2005–2009: Unistar Academy, Ghana
- 2009–2010: IFK Göteborg, Sweden

Senior Career

- 2010–2011: Liberty Professionals Accra, Ghana (20 match, 13 goals)
- 2011–2013: Amidaus Professionals, Ghana (25 match, 11 goals)
- 2013–2015: Berekum Chelsea FC, Ghana (19 match, 12 goals)
- 2015–2016: Saham Club, Oman (20 match, 10 goals)
- 2017: Buildcon F.C., Zambia (26 match, 10 goals)
- 2018–present: Welwalo Adigrat University FC, Ethiopia
