= Ethiopian Premier League =

Ethiopian association football league

CBE Ethiopian Premier League
- Founded: 1944
- Country: Ethiopia
- Confederation: CAF
- Number of clubs: 20
- Level on pyramid: 1
- Relegation to: Ethiopian Higher League
- Domestic cups: Ethiopian Cup; Ethiopian Super Cup; Addis Ababa City Cup; Gofere Sidama Cup; Tana Cup
- International cups: CAF Champions League; CAF Confederation Cup
- Current champions: Sidama Coffee (1st title) (2025–26)
- Most championships: Saint George (31 titles)
- Top scorer: Abubeker Nassir; Yigezu Bogale; (14 goals each)
- Broadcaster: SuperSport
- Website: ethiopianpremierleague.net
- Current: 2025–26 Ethiopian Premier League

The Ethiopian Premier League (Amharic: የኢትዮጵያ ፕሪምየር ሊግ), known as the CBE Ethiopian Premier League for sponsorship reasons, is the top tier association football league of Ethiopia run by the Ethiopian Premier League Share Company (formerly the Ethiopian Football Federation from 1997 to 2020). Established in 1997 (1990 E.C.), it replaced the former first division (est. 1944). Contested by twenty clubs, it operates on a system of promotion and relegation with the other secondary and tertiary leagues in Ethiopia. The league has been an annual competition since the 1997–98 season with Saint George emerging as the country's leading club in this era with 15 titles (30 first division titles overall).

== History ==
=== Beginnings ===
The first officially recognized version of an Ethiopian football league was established in 1944. Originally five teams representing the various communities of Addis Ababa and The British Military Mission in Ethiopia (BMME) contested for the title which was won by the BMME. The Ethiopian Cup was added the following year and has been contested regularly since with the exception of some gap years.

The early years of Ethiopian top division football were dominated for the most part by Mechal (now Defense Force SC). The club won 6 titles throughout the 40s and 50s. St. George SC enjoyed some dominance in the late 60s after which the league went through a period of relative parity in the 70s and 80s. The league went through changes in the 1990s culminating in the founding of the Ethiopian Premier League in 1997 (1990 E.C.) by the Ethiopian Football Federation (EFF) and the teams that made up the top division of Ethiopian Football.

=== Premier League Era ===
The inaugural 1997-98 Ethiopian Premier League Season saw Ethio Electric (known as Mebrat Hail at the time) lift the trophy. The following year the league decided to increase the number of teams to 10, a year that ended with perennial favorites St. George S.C lifting their first Premier League trophy (16th title overall). St. George would go on to repeat as champions the following year (1999-00 season).

The 2000–01 season was a special one in the league thanks in large part to the offensive display of Ethio Electric striker Yordanos Abay. Abay scored what was then a record 24 goals during his league campaign helping Ethio Electric to its second Premier League title (3rd overall title). His record would stand 16 years until being surpassed by Dedebit striker Getaneh Kebede who scored 25 goals during the 2016-17 season. The following season (2001-02 season) Ethio Electric were picked by many to repeat as champions, but fell short of expectation by finishing behind eventual champions St. George.

The 2002–03 season saw the first real contenders from outside the Addis Ababa push for a Premier League title. The title race came down to the last day with St. George needing a win against rivals Ethiopian Coffee to secure their 4th Premier League title (19th overall title). Second place side Arba Minch Textiles, based in southern city of Arba Minch, was looking to win its first title but needed a St. George S.C. lose to do so. In the end however, St. George was able to win their match and retain the title but the strong display by Arba Minch Textiles showed that teams outside the capital were indeed ready to contend in the top league once again.

The 2003–04 season turned out to be breakthrough year for teams outside of Addis Ababa as Hawassa City S.C., led by their captain Kamal Ahmed, were able to lift the Premier League trophy for the first time in their history. The title race once again came down to the last day as Hawassa City had to beat Nyala S.C. to fend off the likes of Ethiopian Coffee S.C. and Trans Ethiopia for the Premier League title. The following two season were once again dominated by St. George S.C. as they were able to lift their 5th and 6th Premier League titles (20th and 21st titles overall). The start of the 2006–07 season saw the league expand to 16 clubs. The season ended with Hawassa City winning their second title in as many years preventing a St. George S.C. three peat. However, the next three consecutive seasons would be again dominated by St. George, under the guide of their manager Mencho, St. George would add their 7th, 8th and 9th Premier League titles (22nd, 23rd, & 24th titles overall). St. George's biggest rivals, Ethiopian Coffee, would put a stop to their tremendous run by winning the 2010-11 title, their first Premier League title (second title overall). However, St. George would come back the next season and win the title once again in 2011-12. St. George's attempt at a repeat would be thwarted though as the next season Dedebit F.C. would instead be crown champions for the first time in their history.

Starting from the 2013-14 season to the 2016-17 season St. George S.C. would do something that has only been done once before in first division football in Ethiopia and that was winning 4 titles in a row. Notably the 2016-17 season was the first to include 16 clubs, after the Federation decided to expand the league from the previous total of 14 clubs. In turn only two clubs were relegated from the league at the end of the previous season (2015-16) and they were replaced by four promoted clubs from the Higher League in order to form the new 16 club Ethiopian Premier League. On May 2, 2018, the league was suspended by the Ethiopian Football Federation (EFF) after a referee was attacked during a match between Welwalo Adigrat University and Defense. League play would not resume until two weeks later when assurances were made to the arbiters union that referees would receive insurance coverage in the near future and that previous medical expenses would be covered by the responsible clubs. The 2017-18 Ethiopian Premier League ended in dramatic fashion as debutantes Jimma Aba Jifar F.C. lifted the trophy for the first time in their history on the last day. Jimma Aba Jifar and St. George came into the last day tied on points and goal difference, but a 5–0 victory for Jimma Aba Jifar and a 2-0 result for St. George S.C. meant that the title would go to Jimma thanks to +3 goal difference advantage over St. George S.C. After the 2017-18 season the EFF and premier league clubs agreed to reduce the number of foreign players allowed on each team to three. Rising wages and the neglect of home grown players were given as some of the reasons why the move was made.

On May 5, 2020, the 2019-20 Season was canceled due to the COVID-19 pandemic. As a result, no champion was awarded and no clubs were relegated from the league in this season.

On December 12, 2020, the 2020-21 Season officially kicked off. On May 6, 2021 Fasil Kenema was confirmed to be the 2020-21 premier league champion, the club's first ever first division title.

== Competition format ==
=== Competition ===
There are 20 clubs in the Premier League. During the course of a season (from November to May) each club plays the others twice (a double round-robin system), once at their home stadium and once at that of their opponents', for a total of 38 games. Teams receive three points for a win and one point for a draw. No points are awarded for a loss. Teams are ranked by total points, then goal difference, and then goals scored. The three lowest placed teams are relegated into the Ethiopian Higher League (second tier of Ethiopian football) and the top three teams from the Higher League are promoted in their place.

Ethiopia football

=== Qualification for African competitions ===
The winner of the Ethiopian Premier League automatically qualifies for the following year's CAF Champions League. The winner of the Ethiopian Cup qualifies for the preliminary round of the CAF Confederation Cup.

== Trophy ==
The Ethiopian Premier League trophy was designed and made in a collaboration among Ethiopian Agency, Lomii Media, and British silversmiths Thomas Lyte. The trophy is a silver-plated sculpture resembling a mesob (Ethiopian container for transporting Injera), topped with a football. The total height of the trophy is 80cm.

== Clubs ==
=== 2022-23 season ===
Locations of clubs participating in the 2022–23 Ethiopian Premier League

The following 16 clubs will compete in the Ethiopian Premier League during the 2022–23 season. For a list of winners of the Ethiopian Premier League since its inception, see List of Ethiopian football champions.

Club	Position 2019-20	Top Division		Location	Stadium	Capacity
Club	Position 2019-20	Titles	Last title			
Adama City	N/A	0	Never	Adama	Abebe Bikila Stadium	4,000
Legetafo Legedadi	N/A	0	Never	Addis Ababa	Addis Ababa	35,000
Arba Minch	N/A	0	Never	Arba Minch	Arba Minch Stadium	5,000
Bahir Dar Kenema	N/A	0	Never	Bahir Dar	Bahir Dar Stadium	60,000
Dire Dawa City	N/A	0	Never	Dire Dawa	Dire Dawa	18,000
Ethiopian Coffee	2	2	2010-11	Addis Ababa	Addis Ababa	35,000
Fasil Kenema	1	1	2020-21	Gondar	Fasiledes	20,000
Hadiya Hossana	N/A	0	Never	Hossana	Abiy Hersamo Stadium	5,000
Hawassa City	N/A	2	2006-07	Hawassa	Hawassa Kenema Stadium	15,000
Ethiopian Insurance	N/A	1	2017-18	Addis Ababa	Addis Ababa	15,000
Mekelakeya	N/A	11	1988-89	Addis Ababa	Addis Ababa	35,000
Saint George	N/A	31	2016-17	Addis Ababa	Addis Ababa	35,000
Ethio Electric	N/A	0	Never	Addis Ababa	Addis Ababa	5,000
Sidama Coffee	N/A	0	Never	Hawassa	Hawassa Stadium	25,000
Wolaitta Dicha	N/A	0	Never	Wolaita Sodo	Sodo Stadium	30,000
Wolkite City	N/A	0	Never	Wolkite	Wolkite Stadium	1,500

=== 2021–22 season ===
- Champion: Saint George
- Relegated: Sebeta City, Jimma Aba Jifar, Addis Ababa City
- Promoted: Ethio Electric, Legetafo Legedadi and Ethiopian Insurance

== Television Rights ==
In the past matches were rarely if ever broadcast live on television, with those that did airing on the national broadcaster EBC. However, the liberalization of the television market in recent years has allowed for informal transmission of live matches, especially on regional channels such as Amhara TV in the north and Debub TV in the south. Recently the Ethiopian super cup final was televised on ENN TV, a private Ethiopian satellite channel, for the first time. However, these live transmissions have come under much scrutiny from the federation as it claims that neither the clubs nor the broadcasters are informing the proper authority. The federation has threatens to take legal measures against clubs who don't cooperate in the matter.

In June 2017 as part of the Ethiopian Football Federation's digitization process the rights to broadcast the premier league were opened for bidding to five companies including Kana TV, ENN, Walta TV and Chinese Pay television broadcaster, StarTimes. However, the Federation was not satisfied with their income distribution statements in the proposals and negotiations stalled.

In October 2020, SuperSport secured exclusive broadcast rights to the Ethiopian Premier League.

== Champions ==
In total 21 clubs have won the top division of Ethiopian football, including titles before the inception of the Ethiopian Premier League, namely First Division. This list includes clubs from Eritrea, which played their football in Ethiopia until the creation of the Eritrean Premier League in 1994.

Club	Winners	Winning years, First Division era	Winning years, Premier League era
Saint George (Addis Ababa)	31	1950, 1966, 1967, 1968, 1971, 1975, 1985, 1986, 1987, 1990, 1991, 1992, 1994, 1995, 1996	1999, 2000, 2002, 2003, 2005, 2006, 2008, 2009, 2010, 2012, 2014, 2015, 2016, 2017, 2022, 2023
Mechal (includes Army & Defense) [Addis Abeba]	11	1949, 1951, 1952, 1953, 1954, 1956, 1976, 1982, 1984, 1988, 1989	Never
Cotton FC (Dire Dawa)	5	1960, 1962, 1963, 1965, 1983	Never
Asmara (includes Hamassien) [Eritrea]	4	1955, 1957, 1972, 1973	exited Ethiopia (1994)
EEPCO (Addis Abeba)	3	1993	1998, 2001
Tele SC (Eritrea)	3	1959, 1969, 1970	exited Ethiopia (1994)
Ethiopian Coffee (Addis Abeba; a.k.a. Coffee)	2	1997	2011
Embassoria (includes Akale Guzay) [Eritrea]	2	1958, 1974	exited Ethiopia (1994)
Ethio-Cement	2	1961, 1964	Never
Hawassa City	2	Never	2004, 2007
British Military Mission-BMME (Addis Abeba)	1	1944	N/A
Fasil Kenema (Gondar)	1	Never	2021
Dedebit (Addis Abeba/Mekele)	1	Never	2013
Jimma Aba Jifar (Jimma)	1	Never	2018
Mekelle 70 Enderta (Mekelle)	1	Never	2019
Ermejachen (Addis Abeba)	1	1981	Never
Key Baher (Addis Abeba)	1	1948	Never
Medr Babur (Dire Dawa)	1	1977	Never
Ogaden Anbassa (Harar)	1	1978	Never
Omedla (Addis Abeba)	1	1979	Never
Tegl Fre (Addis Abeba)	1	1980	Never
CBE (Addis Abeba)	1	Never	2024
Ethiopian Insurance (Addis Abeba)	1	Never	2025
Sidama Coffee	1	Never	2026

== Previous winners ==
Years	Champions
1944	B.M.M.E. (1)
Not held between 1945 and 1947
1948	Key Baher (1)
1949	Mechal (1)
1950	Saint-George (1)
1951	Mechal (2)
1952	Mechal (3)
1953	Mechal (4)
1954	Mechal (5)
1955	Hamassien (1)
1956	Mechal (6)
1957	Hamassien (2)
1958	Embassoria (1)
1959	Tele (1)
1960	Cotton (1)
1961	Ethio-Cement (1)
1962	Cotton (2)
1963	Cotton (3)
1964	Ethio-Cement (2)
1965	Cotton (4)
1966	Saint-George (2)
1967	Saint-George (3)
1968	Saint-George (4)
1969	Tele (2)
1970	Tele (3)
1971	Saint-George (5)
1972	Asmara Brewery (1)
1973	Asmara Brewery (2)
1974	Embassoria (2)
1975	Saint-George (6)
1976	Mechal (7)
1977	Medr Babur (1)
1978	Ogaden Anbassa (1)
1979	Omedla (1)
1980	Tegl Fre (1)
1981	Ermejachen (1)
1982	Mechal (8)
1983	Cotton (5)
1984	Mechal (9)
1985	Saint-George (7)
1986	Saint-George (8)
1987	Saint-George (9)
1988	Mechal (10)
1989	Mechal (11)
1990	Saint-George (10)
1991	Saint-George (11)
1992	Saint-George (12)
1993	Ethio Electric (1)
1994	Saint-George (13)
1995	Saint-George (14)
1996	Saint-George (15)
1997	Ethiopian Coffee (1)
1997–98	Ethio Electric (2)
1998–99	Saint-George (16)
1999–2000	Saint-George (17)
2000–01	Ethio Electric (3)
2001–02	Saint-George (18)
2002–03	Saint-George (19)
2003–04	Awassa City (1)
2004–05	Saint-George (20)
2005–06	Saint-George (21)
2006–07	Awassa City (2)
2007-08	Saint-George (22)
2008–09	Saint-George (23)
2009–10	Saint-George (24)
2010–11	Ethiopian Coffee (2)
2011–12	Saint-George (25)
2012–13	Dedebit (1)
2013–14	Saint-George (26)
2014–15	Saint-George (27)
2015–16	Saint-George (28)
2016–17	Saint-George (29)
2017–18	Jimma Aba Jifar (1)
2018–19	Mekele 70 Enderta (1)
2019–20	Championship canceled
2020–21	Fasil City (1)
2021–22	Saint-George (30)
2022–23	Saint-George (31)
2023–24	CBE (1)
2024–25	Ethiopian Insurance (1)
2025–26	Sidama Coffee (1)

== Top goalscorer ==
=== Top goalscorer by season ===
Year		Best scorers	Team	Goals
2000–01	(Ethiopia)	Yordanos Abay	EEPCO	24
2001–02	(Ethiopia)	Yordanos Abay	EEPCO	20
2004–05	(Ethiopia)	Medhane Tadesse	Trans Ethiopia	19
2005–06	(Ethiopia)	Tesfaye Tafese	Ethiopian Coffee	Unknown
2006–07	(Ethiopia)	Tesfaye Tafese	Ethiopian Coffee	Unknown
2007–08	(Ethiopia)	Saladin Said	Saint George SC	21
2010–11	(Ethiopia) (Ethiopia)	Adane Girma; Getaneh Kebede	Saint George SC; Dedebit	20
2011–12	(Ethiopia)	Adane Girma	Saint George SC	22
2014–15	(Nigeria)	Samuel Sanumi	Dedebit	22
2016–17	(Ethiopia)	Getaneh Kebede	Dedebit	25
2017–18	(Nigeria)	Okiki Afolabi	Jimma Aba Jifar	23
2018–19	(Ethiopia)	Amanuel Gebremichael	Mekelle 70 Enderta	18
2019–20*	(Ethiopia)	Mujib Kassim	Fasil Kenema SC	14*
2020–21	(Ethiopia)	Abubeker Nassir	Ethiopian Coffee SC	29
2021–22	(Ethiopia)	Yigezu Bogale	Sidama Coffee S.C.	16
2022–23	(Togo)	Ismaïl Ouro-Agoro	Saint George SC	25
2023–24	(Eritrea)	Ali Sulieman	Hawassa City	20

*The 2019-20 Season was voided after week 17.

=== All-Time Single Season Top Goal Scorers ===
No.	Year		Best scorers	Team	Goals
1.	2020–21	(Ethiopia)	Abubeker Nassir	Ethiopian Coffee SC	29
2.	2016–17	(Ethiopia)	Getaneh Kebede	Dedebit	25
3.	2000–01	(Ethiopia)	Yordanos Abay	EEPCO	24
4.	2017–18	(Nigeria)	Okiki Afolabi	Jimma Aba Jifar	23
5.	2011–12	(Ethiopia)	Adane Girma	Saint George SC	22
5.	2014–15	(Nigeria)	Samuel Sanumi	Dedebit	22
6.	2007–08	(Ethiopia)	Saladin Said	Saint George SC	21
7.	2001–02	(Ethiopia)	Yordanos Abay	EEPCO	20
7.	2010–11	(Ethiopia) (Ethiopia)	Adane Girma; Getaneh Kebede	Saint George SC; Dedebit	20
8.	2004–05	(Ethiopia)	Medhane Tadesse	Trans Ethiopia	19
9.	2018–19	(Ethiopia)	Amanuel Gebremichael	Mekelle 70 Enderta	18
10.	2019–20*	(Ethiopia)	Mujib Kassim	Fasil Kenema SC	14*

*The 2019-20 Season was voided after week 17.

== See also ==
- Ethiopian Higher League
- Addis Ababa City Cup
- Ethiopian Cup
- Ethiopian Super Cup
- List of Ethiopian football champions
