= Saladin Said =

Ethiopian footballer (born 1988)

Personal information
- Full name: Salah El Din Ahmed Said
- Date of birth: 29 October 1988 (age 38)
- Place of birth: Asosa, Ethiopia
- Height: 1.83 m (6 ft 0 in)
- Position: Forward

Youth career
- Muger Cement

Senior career*
Years	Team	Apps	(Gls)
2007–2011	Saint George	112	(41)
2011–2014	Wadi Degla	15	(6)
2013	→ Lierse (loan)	5	(1)
2014–2015	Al Ahly	17	(4)
2015	MC Alger	5	(0)
2016–2021	Saint George	-	(15)
2021–2022	Jimma Aba Jifar	12	(6)
2022–2023	Sidama Coffee	11	(9)

International career^{‡}
2007–2017	Ethiopia	28	(14)
- * Club domestic league appearances and goals as of 12:00, 25 June 2023 (EST) ‡ National team caps and goals as of 5 March 2018

Salah El Din Ahmed Said (Amharic: ሳላዲን ኤል ዲን አህመድ ሰይድ; born 29 October 1988), also known as Salhadin Said or Saladin Said, is an Ethiopian former professional footballer who played as a forward. His energy, skill, and goal scoring ability in critical games have made him one of the indispensable players in eastern Africa. Salhadin finished as the top scorer in the 2017 CAF Champions League.

== Club career ==
=== Early career ===
In 2010, Salhadin was on trial with Serbian club Partizan, but the transfer failed. Subsequently, he trialled with FK Vojvodina, but did not manage to go further than gaining good wishes and compliments from coach Zoran Milinković.

In 2011, Salhadin scored five goals in a 2011 Kagame Inter-Club Cup game against AS Port from Djibouti.

=== Wadi Degla ===
On 9 October 2011, Salhadin got transferred to Egyptian club Wadi Degla FC, who paid 2,040,000 Ethiopian birr, ($240,000 US), at the time the highest sum ever paid for an Ethiopian footballer.

=== Lierse ===
Salhadin said ahead of Ethiopia's game against Burkina Faso in 2013 Africa Cup of Nations that he was moving to Belgium club Lierse after the Africa Cup.

=== Al Ahly ===
On 23 April 2014, Saladin moved from Wadi Degla to the league rivals Al-Ahly where they had captured 2013 CAF Champions League title.

=== Saint George ===
After an unsuccessful stint at Algerian side MC Alger, Said returned to Saint George in 2016.

== International career ==
Said debuted for the Ethiopia national team in 2005. Since then he has been Ethiopia's top scorer in 2014 FIFA World Cup qualification.

== Career statistics ==
Scores and results list Ethiopia's goal tally first, score column indicates score after each Said goal.

List of international goals scored by Saladin Said
No.	Date	Venue	Opponent	Score	Result	Competition
1	1 June 2007	Addis Ababa Stadium, Addis Ababa, Ethiopia	DR Congo	1–0	1–0	2008 Africa Cup of Nations qualification
2	8 September 2007	Addis Ababa Stadium, Addis Ababa, Ethiopia	Namibia	2–1	2–3	2008 Africa Cup of Nations qualification
3	7 June 2008	Stade Nacional, Nouakchott, Mauritania	Mauritania	1–0	1–0	2010 FIFA World Cup qualification
4	5 June 2011	Addis Ababa Stadium, Addis Ababa, Ethiopia	Nigeria	1–1	2–2	2012 Africa Cup of Nations qualification
5	5 June 2011	Addis Ababa Stadium, Addis Ababa, Ethiopia	Nigeria	2–1	2–2	2012 Africa Cup of Nations qualification
6	3 June 2012	Royal Bafokeng Stadium, Rustenburg	South Africa	1–0	1–1	2014 FIFA World Cup qualification
7	10 June 2012	Addis Ababa Stadium, Addis Ababa, Ethiopia	Central African Republic	1–0	2–0	2014 FIFA World Cup qualification
8	10 June 2012	Addis Ababa Stadium, Addis Ababa, Ethiopia	Central African Republic	2–0	2–0	2014 FIFA World Cup qualification
9	14 October 2012	Addis Ababa Stadium, Addis Ababa, Ethiopia	Sudan	2–0	2–0	2013 Africa Cup of Nations qualification
10	7 January 2013	Al-Wakrah Stadium, Al Wakrah, Qatar	Tunisia	1–1	1–1	Friendly
11	7 September 2013	Stade Alphonse Massemba-Débat, Brazzaville, Republic of the Congo	Central African Republic	1–1	2–1	2014 FIFA World Cup qualification
12	6 September 2014	Addis Ababa Stadium, Addis Ababa, Ethiopia	Algeria	1–2	1–2	2015 Africa Cup of Nations qualification
13	14 June 2015	Bahir Dar Stadium, Bahir Dar, Ethiopia	Lesotho	2–1	2–1	2017 Africa Cup of Nations qualification]]
14	3 September 2016	Awassa Kenema Stadium, Hawassa, Ethiopia	Seychelles	2–1	2–1	2017 Africa Cup of Nations qualification
