= Wonji Sugar =

Association football club in Ethiopia

Wonji Sugar is an Ethiopian football club. They are based in Oromia Region. They are a member of the Ethiopian Football Federation national (second) league. Their home stadium is Wonji Stadium.

== Current squad ==
Note: Flags indicate national team as defined under FIFA eligibility rules; some limited exceptions apply. Players may hold more than one non-FIFA nationality.

No.	Pos.	Nation	Player
—	FW	ETH	Elmedin Mohammed
