= Lideta Nyala =

Association football club in Ethiopia

- Ground: Nyala Stadium, Addis Abeba, Ethiopia
- Capacity: 3,000
- League: Ethiopian Premier League
- 2010/11: Relegated

Lideta Nyala is a professional football club based in Addis Abeba, Ethiopia. They play at the Nyala Stadium, a venue in Addis Ababa that has a capacity of 3,000.

== History ==
They were relegated from the Ethiopian Premier League after the conclusion of the 2010–11 season.
