= Sisay =

Sisay, also Sissay, is a male given name of Ethiopian origin. Notable people with the name include:

- Sisay Bancha (born 1989), Ethiopian international footballer
- Lemn Sissay (born 1967), British-Ethiopian writer
