= Embassoria =

Association football club in Ethiopia

- Full name: Embassoria
- Nickname(s): Akale Guzay
- Founded: 1951
- League: Eritrean & Ethiopian leagues

Embassoria was an Ethiopian football club based in Mereb Milash (Eritrea). They are a member of the Ethiopian Football Federation national league.

In 1975 the team have participated in the African Cup of Champions Clubs.

== History ==
The club was one of the best in Eritrea when it was a province of Ethiopia.

The football club was founded in the city of Mereb Milash and was part of the Ethiopian Football Federation from 1951 to 1998, when the independence of Eritrea was declared. Under the Ethiopia competition system, the club managed to win the Ethiopian Premier League in 1974, its only title so far.

Since the independence of Eritrea, the club has never been in the Eritrean Premier League and has always been between the second and third football levels in the country.

Internationally the team has participated in a continental tournament, the African Cup of Champions Clubs 1975, where they were eliminated in the first round by AS Inter Star of Burundi.

Actually it is in deep crisis and has practically disappeared from football activity in Eritrea since 2016. But in 2019 there are entrepreneur's discussions about the possibility of re-create the football club in the Eritrean premier league.

== Performance in Caf competitions ==
- 1975 African Cup of Champions Clubs
