= Fincha Sugar =

Association football club in Ethiopia

Fincha Sugar is an association football club from Fincha'a, Ethiopia. They play at the 5,000 capacity Fincha Stadium.

Previously they were in the Ethiopian Premier League, prior to relegation in the 2010–11 season.
