= Trans Ethiopia =

Association football club in Ethiopia

- Full name: Trans Ethiopia
- Founded: 1975
- Ground: Tigray Stadium; Tigray, Ethiopia
- Capacity: 10,000
- Owner: Trans Ethiopia PLC
- Chairman: Gebremeskel Gebru
- Manager: Sewenet Beshaw
- League: Ethiopian Premier League
- 2006/07: 13
Home colours

Trans Ethiopia (Amharic: ትራንስ ኢትዮጵያ) was a professional Ethiopian football club based in north Mek'ele. They were a member of the Ethiopian Football Federation and played in the national league (now the Higher League), the second division of Ethiopian football.

== History ==
The club formerly played in the Ethiopian Premier League, the top division of Ethiopian football. It is one of an only handful of Premier League clubs to have a golden boot winner in its side. They played in the Ethiopian second division also known as Ethiopian National League. Trans is the most successful football club to represent Tigray in the Ethiopian Premier League, finishing number of times in the top four. In the 2008–09 season they are struggling. They have escaped relegation the previous season 2008/09 but now they have made bright start to the 2009/10 season.

== Stadium ==
Their home stadium is Tigray Stadium also known as Balloni.

== Support ==
Their biggest rival is Guna Trading FC, which are from the south of Mekelle and more urban area.

== Former managers ==
- (Ethiopia) Sewnet Beshaw
