= Ethiopian Insurance FC =

Association football club in Ethiopia

Ethiopian Insurance
- Full name: Ethiopian Insurance Football Club
- Nickname: Medhin
- Ground: Addis Ababa Stadium
- Capacity: 20,000
- Manager: Tsegaye Wondimu
- League: Ethiopian Premier League
- 2025–26: 14th of 18
Home colours	Away colours

Ethiopian Insurance Football Club (Amharic: ኢትዮጵያ መድን እግር ኳስ ክለብ), also known as Ethiopian Medhin, is an Ethiopian professional football club based in the city of Addis Ababa. They play in the Ethiopian Premier League, the top division of professional football in Ethiopia.

== History ==
The Club parted ways with their manager of less than a year Derege Belay in April 2018.

== Finances ==
In 2019, Medhin had a dispute with some of its players over unpaid wages.

== Departments ==
=== Active departments ===
- Football Team (U17)

== Honors ==
=== Domestic ===
- Ethiopian Premier League
  - Champions (1): 2024–25
- Ethiopian Cup
  - Winners (2): 1995, 2002

=== Continental ===
- CAF Cup Winners' Cup: 1 appearance

2003 – First Round

- CAF Cup: 1 appearance

1993 – Semi-Final
1999 – First Round

== Players ==
=== First-team squad ===
As of 31 July 2023

Note: Flags indicate national team as defined under FIFA eligibility rules; some limited exceptions apply. Players may hold more than one non-FIFA nationality.

No.	Pos.	Nation	Player
1	GK	ETH	Abubeker Nura
2	DF	ETH	Abdulkerim Mohammed
—	GK	ETH	Tamrat Dagne
—	DF	ETH	Abdulkedir Nesru
—	DF	ETH	Kebede Assefa
—	DF	ETH	Wogayehu Worka
—	DF	ETH	Sisay
—	FW	ETH	Yonas Babena
—	FW	ETH	Fuad Mohamed
—	FW	ETH	Dawit Fekadu
—	FW	ETH	Afkerot Solomon
—	MF	ETH	Natanael Worku
—	FW	ETH	Gulat Teshome
—	DF	ETH	Brihanu Bekalu
—		ETH	Kuma Demessie
—	GK	ETH	Temesgen Yohannes

== Former managers ==
- (Ethiopia) Derege Belay
- (Ethiopia) Yared Tolera (2019–2020)
- (Ethiopia) Asrat Haile

== Former players ==
- (Ethiopia) Aseged Tesfaye
- (Ethiopia) Wondyifraw Getahun
- (Ethiopia) Asrat Shegere
