= Ethio Electric SC =

Association football club in Ethiopia

Ethio Electric
- Full name: Ethio Electric Sport Club
- Nickname: The Red Devils
- Founded: 1960 (1953 E.C.)
- Ground: Mebrat Hail Stadium; Addis Ababa, Ethiopia
- Capacity: 8,000
- Owner: Ethiopian Electric Power
- Chairman: Mr Araya Haile
- Manager: Kifle Boltena
- League: Ethiopian Premier League
- 2025–26: 5th
| Home colours | Away colours |

Ethio Electric Sport Club (Amharic: ኢትዮ ኤሌክትሪክ ስፖርት ክለብ), also known as EEPCO or Mebrat Hail, is an Ethiopian professional football club based in Addis Ababa. The club currently plays in the Ethiopian Higher League, the second division of Ethiopian football.

== History ==
=== Beginnings ===
Ethio-Electric was found as Ethiopian Electric Power Sport Club in 1960 (1953 EC.) by the Ethiopian Electric Power Corporation. It's one of the most historic clubs in Ethiopian football

In September 2018 the club announced sweeping changes at all levels of the club including hiring former Ethio-Electric star player Anwar Yasin as the club's manager.

=== Ethiopian Premier League ===
Ethio-Electric won the inaugural Ethiopian Premier League during the 1997–98 Season, known as Mebrat Hail at the time it was the club's second overall title. The club also enjoyed a great 2000–01 premier league campaign as their star striker Yordanos Abay scored a record 24 goals during the season helping Ethio-Electric to its second Premier League title (3rd overall title). His record would stand 16 years until the 2016–17 season when Dedebit striker Getaneh Kebede scored 25 goals surpassed his mark. The 2001–02 season saw Ethio-Electric picked as favorites to repeat as champions, but unfortunately fail to meet expectations as they finished behind eventual champions St. George. In 2010, the club hired former Lokomotiv Sofia and Bulgarian National team player Yordan Stoykov as its head coach.

=== Recent troubles ===
In 2016 Ethio-Electric beat Saint George S.C. to lift the club's third Addis Ababa City Cup at Addis Ababa Stadium. Ethio-Electric was relegated from the Ethiopian Premier League after the 2017–18 season.

== Stadium ==
Ethio-Electric's home stadium is Mebrat Hail Stadium.

== Finances ==
The club has been, from its inception, financially supported by the Ethiopian Mebrat Haile (now called the Ethiopian Electric Power Corporation). In 2021, in an efforts to be more financially independent, the club constructed shops around its stadium at a cost of 2.6 million birr.

== Departments ==
The women's team is Managed by Eyerusalem Negash as of 2018.

=== Active departments ===
- Women's Football Team
- Football Team (U17)

== Honors ==
=== Domestic ===
==== League ====
- Ethiopian Premier League: 3
  - 1993, 1998, 2001

==== Cups ====
- Ethiopian Cup: 4
  - 1971, 1972, 1976, 2001
- Ethiopian Super Cup: 3
  - 1993, 1998, 2001
- Addis Ababa City Cup: 3
  - 2005, 2006, 2016

=== African ===
- CAF Champions League: 2 appearances
  - 1999 – First Round
  - 2002 – Preliminary Round
- African Cup of Champions Clubs: 1 appearance
  - 1994 – First Round
- CAF Cup: 3 appearances
  - 1996 – First Round
  - 1998 – Second Round
  - 2001 – Second Round

== Club officials ==
CEO: (Ethiopia) Lemma Bedele

President: (Ethiopia) Chala Aman

Chairman: (Ethiopia) Araya Haile

Technical Directors: (Ethiopia) Tesfaye Zergaw and (Ethiopia) Golalit Firde

=== Coaching and medical staff ===
Manager: (Ethiopia) Kifle Boltena

Assistant Coach(s): (Ethiopia) Mesfin Shebeshe and (Ethiopia) Lemma Debele

Goalkeeping Coach: (Ethiopia) Daniel Tesfaye

Team Leader: (Ethiopia) Aklilu Gebremariam

== Former managers ==
- (Ethiopia) Berhanu Bayu
- (Ethiopia) Anwar Yasin
- (Ethiopia) Addisu Negash
- (Ethiopia) Bogale Zewdu
- (Ethiopia) Wondimu Bekele
- (Ethiopia) Hagos Desta
- (Bulgaria) Yordan Stoikov (2010–14)

== Former players ==
- (Ethiopia) Yordanos Abay
- (Burundi) Didier Kavumbagu
- (Ethiopia) Anwar Yasin
- (Ethiopia) Mulualem Tilahun
- (Ethiopia) Radi Abreha
- (Ivory Coast) Ibrahim Fofano
- (Ethiopia) Bereket Tessema
