= Getaneh Kebede =

Ethiopian footballer (born 1992)

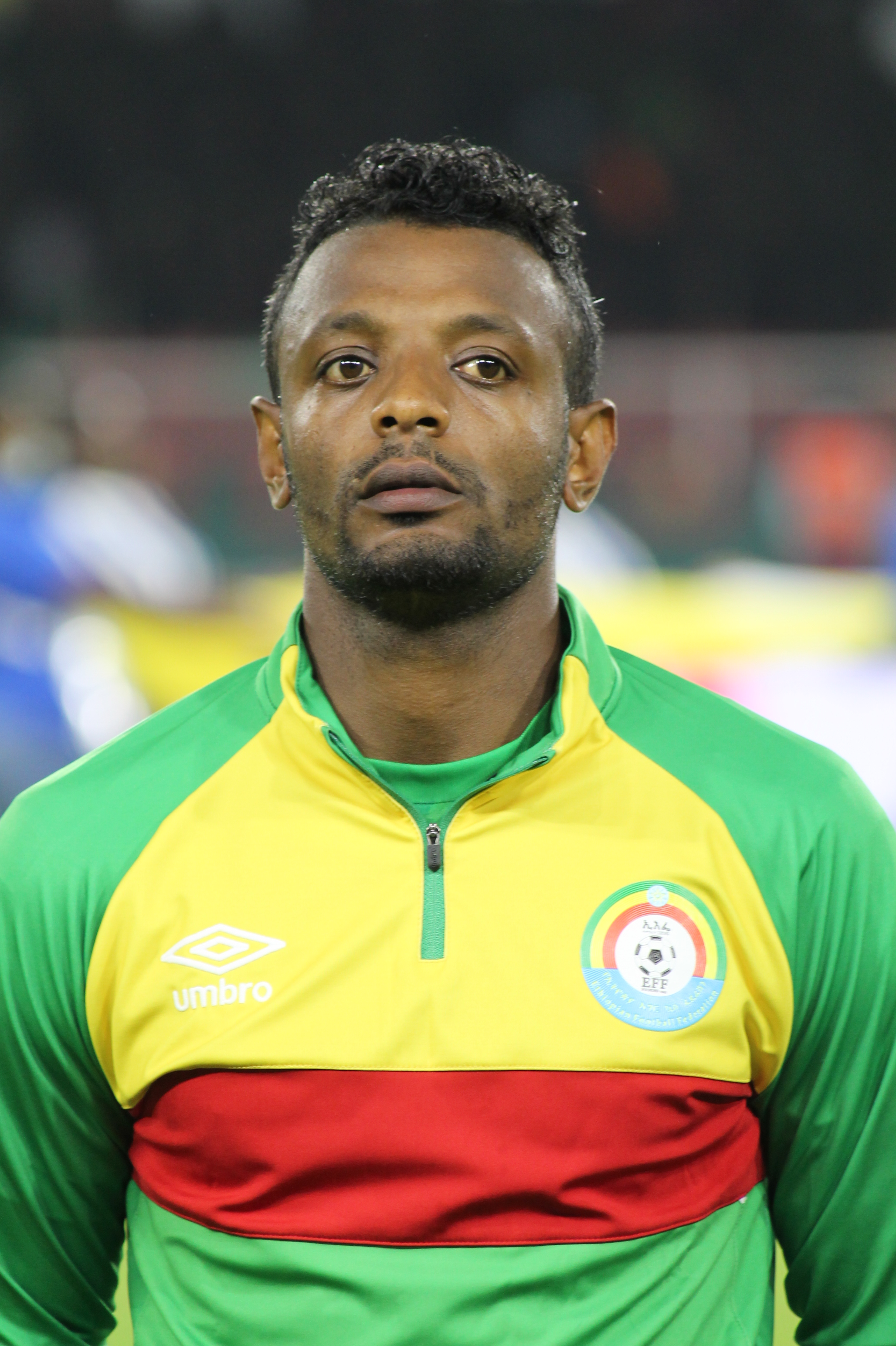
- Getaneh with Ethiopia at the 2021 Africa Cup of Nations

Personal information
- Full name: Getaneh Kebede Gebeto
- Date of birth: 2 April 1992 (age 34)
- Place of birth: Addis Ababa, Ethiopia
- Height: 1.78 m (5 ft 10 in)
- Position: Striker

Team information
- Current team: Hawassa City
- Number: 9

Youth career
- 2007–2010: Debub Police

Senior career*
Years	Team	Apps	(Gls)
2010–2013	Dedebit	80	(40)
2013–2016	Bidvest Wits	27	(6)
2015–2016	→ University of Pretoria (loan)	19	(2)
2016–2018	Dedebit		(25)
2018–2021	Saint George	87	(84)
2021–2023	Wolkite City	62	(34)
2023–2025	Fasil Kenema	58	(21)
2025–	Hawassa City	0	(0)

International career
2010–2022	Ethiopia	66	(33)
- * Club domestic league appearances and goals as of 21:00, 13 June 2025 (UTC)

Getaneh Kebede Gebeto (Amharic: ጌታነህ ከበደ ገበቶ; born 2 April 1992) is an Ethiopian professional footballer who plays as a striker for and captains Hawassa City.

He is the nation's all-time top goalscorer, having scored 33 goals in 67 matches.

== Early life ==
Getaneh was born in Dilla, Ethiopia.

== Club career ==
=== Dedebit ===
He began his club career with Debub Police, before which he moved to Dedebit. He was the 2013 top scorer of the Ethiopian Premier League.

=== Bidvest Wits ===
On 19 July 2013, it was announced that Getaneh succeeded in a trial with Bidvest Wits and signed a three-year contract with the team.

==== 2015–16: Loan to University of Pretoria ====
On 1 August 2015, Getaneh officially joined University of Pretoria on a season-long loan deal.

=== Return to Dedebit ===
In September 2016 he joined his old club Dedebit.

=== Saint George ===
On 14 August 2018, the 29-time league champions Saint George announced they had signed Getaneh to a two-year contract.

=== Wolkite City ===
On 6 October 2021, Wolkite City officially announced the signing of Getaneh.

=== Fasil Kenema ===
On 2 September 2023, Getaneh joined Fasil Kenema with a two-year contract.

== International career ==
Getaneh was part of the Ethiopia national team, where he made his debut in a 2010 CECAFA Cup match against Malawi in December 2010. In a 2014 FIFA World Cup qualifier against Somalia, he scored two goals in a second leg 5–0 win, which sent Ethiopia to the second round of World Cup qualification. On 29 March 2016, Getaneh scored twice against Algeria in a 2017 Africa Cup of Nations qualifier held in Addis Ababa to draw 3–3 and deny the Desert Foxes qualification to the final tournament. He scored two goals against Lesotho in a 2–1 win on 5 June 2016 and added one more goal in the return match at the Hawassa Kenema Stadium on 3 September 2016. Ethiopia won the game 2–1 and finished runners-up in Group J, though they were unable to qualify for the 2017 Africa Cup of Nations. However, Getaneh finished as the second top scorer of qualification with six goals, behind only Hillal Soudani of Algeria's seven goals.

On 31 December 2022, Getaneh announced his retirement from international football.

== Career statistics ==
=== International ===
Appearances and goals by national team and year
National team	Year	Apps	Goals
Ethiopia	2010	2	0
Ethiopia	2011	6	3
Ethiopia	2012	5	2
Ethiopia	2013	10	2
Ethiopia	2014	5	2
Ethiopia	2015	4	2
Ethiopia	2016	4	6
Ethiopia	2017	9	4
Ethiopia	2018	4	2
Ethiopia	2020	5	4
Ethiopia	2021	10	5
Ethiopia	2022	3	1
Total		67	33

Scores and results list Ethiopia's goal tally first, score column indicates score after each Kebede goal.

List of international goals scored by Getaneh Kebede
No.	Date	Venue	Opponent	Score	Result	Competition	Ref.
1	16 November 2011	Addis Ababa Stadium, Addis Ababa, Ethiopia	Somalia	4–0	5–0	2014 FIFA World Cup qualification	
2	16 November 2011	Addis Ababa Stadium, Addis Ababa, Ethiopia	Somalia	5–0	5–0	2014 FIFA World Cup qualification	
3	28 November 2011	Benjamin Mkapa Stadium, Dar es Salaam, Tanzania	Sudan	1–1	1–1	2011 CECAFA Cup	
4	8 September 2012	Al-Merrikh Stadium, Omdurman, Sudan	Sudan	1–1	3–5	2013 Africa Cup of Nations qualification	
5	30 December 2012	Addis Ababa Stadium, Addis Ababa, Ethiopia	Niger	1–0	1–0	Friendly	
6	24 March 2013	Addis Ababa Stadium, Addis Ababa, Ethiopia	Botswana	1–0	1–0	2014 FIFA World Cup qualification	
7	16 June 2013	Addis Ababa Stadium, Addis Ababa, Ethiopia	South Africa	1–1	2–1	2014 FIFA World Cup qualification	
8	10 September 2014	Kamuzu Stadium, Blantyre, Malawi	Malawi	1–1	2–3	2015 Africa Cup of Nations qualification	
9	15 October 2014	Stade du 26 Mars, Bamako, Mali	Mali	2–1	3–2	2015 Africa Cup of Nations qualification	
10	14 November 2015	Addis Ababa Stadium, Addis Ababa, Ethiopia	Congo	1–0	3–4	2018 FIFA World Cup qualification	
11	17 November 2015	Stade Alphonse Massemba-Débat, Brazzaville, Republic of the Congo	Congo	1–0	1–2	2018 FIFA World Cup qualification	
12	25 March 2016	Mustapha Tchaker Stadium, Blida, Algeria	Algeria	1–6	1–7	2017 Africa Cup of Nations qualification	
13	29 March 2016	Addis Ababa Stadium, Addis Ababa, Ethiopia	Algeria	1–0	3–3	2017 Africa Cup of Nations qualification	
14	29 March 2016	Addis Ababa Stadium, Addis Ababa, Ethiopia	Algeria	2–1	3–3	2017 Africa Cup of Nations qualification	
15	5 June 2016	Setsoto Stadium, Maseru, Lesotho	Lesotho	1–0	2–1	2017 Africa Cup of Nations qualification	
16	5 June 2016	Setsoto Stadium, Maseru, Lesotho	Lesotho	2–0	2–1	2017 Africa Cup of Nations qualification	
17	3 September 2016	Hawassa Kenema Stadium, Hawassa, Ethiopia	Seychelles	1–1	2–1	2017 Africa Cup of Nations qualification	
18	15 July 2017	El Hadj Hassan Gouled Aptidon Stadium, Djibouti City, Djibouti	Djibouti	1–	5–1	2018 African Nations Championship qualification	
19	15 July 2017	El Hadj Hassan Gouled Aptidon Stadium, Djibouti City, Djibouti	Djibouti	2–	5–1	2018 African Nations Championship qualification	
20	15 July 2017	El Hadj Hassan Gouled Aptidon Stadium, Djibouti City, Djibouti	Djibouti	4–	5–1	2018 African Nations Championship qualification	
21	15 July 2017	El Hadj Hassan Gouled Aptidon Stadium, Djibouti City, Djibouti	Djibouti	5–	5–1	2018 African Nations Championship qualification	
22	2 September 2018	Hawassa Kenema Stadium, Hawassa, Ethiopia	Burundi	1–1	1–1	Friendly	
23	9 September 2018	Hawassa Kenema Stadium, Hawassa, Ethiopia	Sierra Leone	1–0	1–0	2019 Africa Cup of Nations qualification	
24	22 October 2020	Addis Ababa Stadium, Addis Ababa, Ethiopia	Zambia	1–0	2–3	Friendly	
25	25 October 2020	Addis Ababa Stadium, Addis Ababa, Ethiopia	Zambia	1–3	1–3	Friendly	
26	6 November 2020	Addis Ababa Stadium, Addis Ababa, Ethiopia	Sudan	1–0	2–2	Friendly	
27	17 November 2020	Addis Ababa Stadium, Addis Ababa, Ethiopia	Niger	3–0	3–0	2021 Africa Cup of Nations qualification	
28	17 March 2021	Bahir Dar Stadium, Bahir Dar, Ethiopia	Malawi	2–0	4–0	Friendly	
29	24 March 2021	Bahir Dar Stadium, Bahir Dar, Ethiopia	Madagascar	2–0	4–0	2021 Africa Cup of Nations qualification	
30	30 March 2021	Alassane Ouattara Stadium, Abidjan, Ivory Coast	Ivory Coast	1–2	1–3	2021 Africa Cup of Nations qualification	
31	9 October 2021	Bahir Dar Stadium, Bahir Dar, Ethiopia	South Africa	1–1	1–3	2022 FIFA World Cup qualification	
32	11 November 2021	Orlando Stadium, Johannesburg, South Africa	Ghana	1–1	1–1	2022 FIFA World Cup qualification	
33	17 January 2022	Kouekong Stadium, Bafoussam, Cameroon	Burkina Faso	1–1	1–1	2021 Africa Cup of Nations	
