= Jimma Aba Jifar FC =

Association football club in Ethiopia

Jimma Aba Jifar
- Full name: Jimma Aba Jifar Football Club
- Nickname: The Westerns
- Founded: 1983
- Ground: Jimma Stadium; Jimma, Ethiopia
- Capacity: 15,000
- Manager: (Ethiopia) Zemariam Damtew
- League: Ethiopian Higher League
- 2020-21: Premier League 12th of 13
Home colours	Away colours

Jimma Aba Jifar Football Club (Amharic: ጅማ አባ ጅፋር; Afaan Oromo: Jimmaa Abbaa Jifaar) is a professional football club based in Jimma, Ethiopia. They play in the Ethiopian Higher League, the second division of Ethiopian football. The club, who was formally known as Jimma City, was promoted to the Ethiopian Premier League for the first time after the end of the 2016–17 season.

== History ==
The club was founded in 1983 (1975 E.C.). The club finished first in the Ethiopian Higher League (second division) Group B after the 2016/17 season, by virtue earning a promotion to the 2017/18 Ethiopian Premier League. The club has since signed some notable foreign players to the side, including Nigerian striker Okiki Afolabi and Ghanaian Goalkeeper Daniel Agyei.

The club won the 2017/18 Ethiopian Premier League title. Shortly after the 2017–18 season their manager, Gebremedin Haile, left the club to sign with another Premier League club, Mekelle City FC.

The club participated in 2018-19 CAF Champions League as the only representative from Ethiopia. They defeated ASAS Djibouti Télécom 5-3 on aggregate in parliamentary round. However, they made their exit from the tournament in the next round courtesy of a 2-1 aggregate defeat to Egyptian giants Al-Ahly.

FIFA imposed a transfer ban on club in 2020 for unpaid wages to Ghanaian goalkeeper Daniel Agyei.

== Stadium ==
The club plays its matches at Jimma Stadium located in Jimma, Ethiopia. In 2021, Jimma University Stadium was chosen to host matches from week 7 to 11 of the 2020-21 Ethiopian Premier League season.

== Honors ==
=== Domestic ===
- Ethiopian Premier League: 1
  - 2018

=== Continental ===
- CAF Champions League: 1 appearance
  - 2018–19 – first round
- CAF Confederations Cup: 1 appearance
  - 2018–19 – play-off round

== Players ==
=== First-team squad ===
As of 14 January 2021

Note: Flags indicate national team as defined under FIFA eligibility rules; some limited exceptions apply. Players may hold more than one non-FIFA nationality.

No.	Pos.	Nation	Player
1	GK	COD	Jeko Penze
2	DF	ETH	Wondmagegn Markos
3	DF	ETH	Ibrahim Abdulkadir
4	DF	ETH	Kedir Heirdin
6	DF	ETH	Ashenafi Bira
7	FW	ETH	Sadik Secho
8	MF	ETH	Surafel Awol
10	FW	ETH	Muluken Tariku
11	MF	ETH	Bekam Abdella
12	DF	ETH	Amanuel Getachew
14	DF	ETH	Elias Ataro
16	DF	ETH	Melaku Wolde Fantahun
17	FW	ETH	Bezuayehu Endeshaw
18	MF	ETH	Abraham Tamirat
19	FW	ETH	Temesgen Derese

No.	Pos.	Nation	Player
20	MF	ETH	Habtamu Negusse
21	MF	ETH	Negatu Gebreselassie
22	FW	ETH	Samson Kolicha
23	DF	ETH	Wubshet Alemayehu
25	DF	ETH	Endalamin Nassir
26	FW	ETH	Jeylan Kemal
27	DF	ETH	Roba Worku
28	MF	ETH	Tirtaye Demeke
91	GK	ETH	Abubeker Nuri
93	GK	ETH	Yohannes Shikur
—	MF	ETH	Amanuel Teshome
—	FW	GHA	Rahim Osumanu
—	DF	GHA	Alex Amuzu

== Club officials ==
=== Coaching staff ===
- Manager/Head Coach: (Ethiopia) Zemariam Damtew
- Assistant coach: (Ethiopia) Yosef Ali
- Goalkeeper coach: (Ethiopia) Mohamed Jemal
- Team Leader: (Ethiopia) Jehud Kedir
- Physiotherapist: (Ethiopia) Senay Yilma

== Former managers ==
- (Ethiopia) Gebremedin Haile
- (Ethiopia) Paulos Getachew
