= CBE SA =

Association football club in Ethiopia

- Full name: Commercial Bank of Ethiopia Sports Association
- Founded: 1982 (1975 E.C.)
- Ground: Addis Ababa Stadium, Addis Abeba, Ethiopia
- Capacity: 20,000
- League: Ethiopian Premier League
- 2025–26: 13th
Home colours	Away colours

CBE SA (a.k.a. Ethiopia Nigd Bank) is an Ethiopian professional football club, in the city of Addis Ababa. They played in the Ethiopian Premier League, the top level of professional football in Ethiopia.

== History ==
The club was founded in 1982 (1975 E.C.) by the Commercial Bank of Ethiopia.

In 2010, the club was renamed from Banks Sport Club to Commercial Bank of Ethiopia Sports Association.

In the 2020/21 season, the club played in the Ethiopian League 1 and advanced to the Ethiopian Higher League.

In the 2021/22 season, the club made their debut after a long absence from the Ethiopian Higher League but failed to qualify for the Premier League as runners-up to Ethio Electric.

The current men squad has best players like Basiru Umar, Fetudin Jemal, Kitika Jema and Fuad Fereja.

Their top scorer that year was ‘CBE Bank of the year’

== Honors ==
=== Domestic ===
==== League ====
- Ethiopian Premier League: 1

2023–24

==== Cups ====
- Addis Ababa City Cup: 1

2014

== Performance in CAF competitions ==
- CAF Confederation Cup: 2 appearances

2005 – First Round
2010 – First Round
