= Mekelle 70 Enderta FC =

Association football club in Ethiopia

Mekelle 70 Enderta
- Full name: ጋንታ ኩዕሶ እግሪ መቐለ 70 እንደርታ (Mekelle 70 Enderta Football Club)
- Nicknames: ምዓም ኣንበሳ (Lion's Den) ቀያይ አንበሶች (The Red Lions)
- Founded: 2007
- Ground: Tigray Stadium; Mekelle
- Capacity: 60,000
- Chairman: Yirga Gebregziabher
- Manager: Gebremedhin Haile
- League: Ethiopian Premier League
- 2025–26: 19th
| Home colours | Away colours | Third colours |

Mekelle 70 Enderta FC (Amharic: መቐለ 70 እንደርታ) is an Ethiopian professional football club based in Mekelle. They currently play in the top division of Ethiopian football, the Ethiopian Premier League. The club was promoted in 2017. In the 2019, Mekelle 70 Enderta became champion of the Ethiopian Premier League. and represented Ethiopia at the 2019 CAF Champions League but fall short in the first round.

== History ==
2016—2017 Mekelle 70 Enderta finished second (with 60 points) in the Ethiopian Higher League Group A after the 2016–2017 season. They earned a spot in the Premier League by virtue of winning one-game playoff against Hadiya Hossana. This was the club's first promotion to the top division.

2017—2018 After promotion, the club officials sacked manager Getachew Dawit and signed Yohannes Sahle for the 2017–2018 season. Mekelle 70 Enderta had one of their most successful campaigns in the 2017–18 season as the club was part of the title race until very late, before ultimately finishing 4th. After the club's first season in the top division, Mekelle 70 Enderta parted ways with Yohannes Sahle.

2018—2019 On August 8, 2018, the club signed Gebremedhin Haile as their manager for the upcoming season. After a poor start in the season, manager Gebremedhin Haile helped the team break a new record (11 wins in a row). However, rivals Fasil City topped the league table. July 7, 2019 saw as Fasil City drop two points and Mekelle 70 Enderta winning over Dire Dawa City with the help of Amanuel Gebremichael and Osei Mawuli goals, winning its first Ethiopian Premier League title. Amanuel Gebremichael won the Golden Boot, scoring 18 goals. Mekelle drew an average home attendance of 18,212, the highest in the league.

== Name and logo ==
The team is named after the city it was founded in, Mekelle 70 Enderta (the capital of the northern Tigray Region of Ethiopia). The logo is a circle with 2 red lions, Hawelti Semaetat statue, and the castle of king Yohannes IV, which are found in the city of Mekelle.

== Stadium ==
Mekelle play their home games at the Tigray International Stadium in Mekelle. The stadium has a 60,000 capacity.

== Derby ==
Mekelle play in the "Tigray Derby" with fellow Tigray Region club Welwalo Adigrat University FC, and Fasil City which is an arch rival.

== Managers ==
- (Ethiopia) Gebremedhin Haile (2018–19)
- (Ethiopia) Yohannes Sahle (2017–18)
- (Ethiopia) Getachew Dawit (2016–17)

== Honours ==
- Ethiopian Premier League: 1

2019

== Performance in CAF competitions ==
- CAF Champions League: 2 appearances

2020 – Preliminary round
2021 – Withdrew
