= Dedebit F.C. =

Association football club in Ethiopia

- Full name: Dedebit Football Club
- Nicknames: "The Blues" "Blue Army"
- Founded: 1997; 29 years ago
- Ground: Tigray Stadium; Mekelle, Ethiopia
- Capacity: 60,000
- Chairman: Colonel Awel Abdurehim
- Manager: Yidnekachew Alemu (Interim)
- League: Ethiopian Premier League
- 2017–18: 6th
Home colours	Away colours

Dedebit Football Club (Amharic: ደደቢት የእግር ኳስ ክለብ) is an Ethiopian football club based in Mekelle, Ethiopia. They play in the Ethiopian Premier League, the top tier of Ethiopian football. The team officially moved its home base from the capital Addis Ababa to Mekelle after the 2017–18 Season.

== History ==
Dedebit was founded in 1997 as a youth project at an Army Officers' Residential compound.

Dedebit Football Club terminated the contract of their head coach, Yohannes Sahle after he led the team through just three matches in the 2016/17 Ethiopian premier league season.

After the 2017/18 season, the team announced that due to financial restrictions they would only sign players with low wage demands and would let go of players earning high wages including star striker Getaneh Kebede.

=== Domestic competition ===
Dedebit were promoted to the Ethiopian Premier League after a successful 2008–09 season in the second tier of Ethiopian Football, making their Premier League debut in the 2009–10 season. Dedebit shocked the football world when they emerged as the league's early front-runners. They enjoyed a good run on top during that season until eventually finishing runners-up to perennial favorites St. George S.C. Dedebit's first season in the Premier League may not have gone as planned, but they still had a successful season overall, winning the Ethiopian Cup and avenging their league losses to St. George S.C. with a 1–0 victory in the final. In the 2010–11 season Dedebit finished 3rd in table, staying competitive but finishing behind St George and champions Ethiopian Coffee. They would continue this form the following season (2011–12) finishing runners-up again to the champions St. George.

The 2012–13 season was the most successful in the club's history as they were able to win the Ethiopian Premier League for the first time in their history. Many of the players from this title winning team such as Getaneh Kebede would go on to star in the Ethiopian national team.

=== African competition ===
==== CAF Confederation Cup ====
Winning the 2009–10 Ethiopian Cup meant Dedebit had qualified for the preliminary round of the 2011 CAF Confederation Cup. In the 2010–11 season, Dedebit were drawn against Tanzania's Young Africans in the preliminary round of the CAF Confederation. The first leg, held in Dar-es-selam, was a high scoring affair with the match ending in a 4–4 draw. The most significant aspect of this match was that it was Dedebit's very first competitive continental and international match. Having already collected 4 away goals, Dedebit had an outstanding second leg cruising to a 2–0 win at home, advancing into the first round 6–4 on aggregate. In the first round of the competition, Dedebit were matched up against Egyptian side Haras El Hodoud SC. The first leg saw Dedebit get thrashed 4–0 in Alexandria, suffering their first defeat of the competition. On the return leg in Addis Ababa, they were only able to earn a 1–1 draw (finishing 1–5 on aggregate), in the process being eliminated from the competition.

Dedebit qualified for the 2013 CAF Confederation Cup, but unfortunately they met the same fate as two years prior, being eliminated in the first round of the competition.

==== CAF Champions League ====
By virtue of winning the 2012–13 Ethiopian Premier League, Dedebit qualified for the preliminary round of the 2014 CAF Champions League. Drawn against KMKM of Zanzibar in the preliminary round, the first leg in Addis Ababa saw Dedebit easily handle their opponents cruising to a 3–0 win. The second leg was a different story as KMKM were dominant on the day winning 2–0, but falling short of leveling the fixture on aggregate as Dedebit were able to advance to the next round. In the first round, Dedebit met CS Sfaxien of Tunisia with the first leg held in Addis Ababa, where Dedebit fell 2–1. The return leg in Tunis saw CS Sfaxien walking away victorious 2–0, advancing 4–1 on aggregate and eliminating Dedebit in the process.

== Grounds ==
They play games at the Addis Ababa Stadium, which has a capacity of 35,000. Their original home ground is the Abebe Bikila Stadium that has a capacity of 30,000, but as of 2017 it is in process of being renovated. Due to the club moving its home base to Mekelle as of 2018, the club's home ground was accordingly changed to Mekelle Stadium.

== Sponsorships ==
The main sponsor of the club as of the 2017/2018 season is Messebo Cement, an Ethiopian cement company. The official kit supplier of the club is the Italian sportswear maker Errea.

== Women's club ==
Dedebit F.C. women's side plays in the Ethiopian Women's Premier League, having won the league three times.

== Achievements ==
- Ethiopian Premier League: 1

2012–13.

- Ethiopian Cup: 2

2009–10, 2012–13

- Ethiopian Super Cup: 0

== Performance in CAF competitions ==
- CAF Champions League: 1 appearance

2014 – First Round

- CAF Confederation Cup: 2 appearances

2011 – First Round
2013 – First Round

== Current squad ==
Note: Flags indicate national team as defined under FIFA eligibility rules; some limited exceptions apply. Players may hold more than one non-FIFA nationality.

No.	Pos.	Nation	Player
1	GK	ETH	Sisay Bancha
2	DF	ETH	Zenebe Kebede
5	DF	GHA	Kweku Andoh
6	DF	ETH	Biruk Teshome
8	MF	ETH	Samson Alemu
9	FW	ETH	Michael Asekarda
11	MF	ETH	Ephrem Zeru
13	FW	ETH	Ashenafi Endale
14	DF	ETH	Aklilu Ayanaw Chekol
15	DF	ETH	Robel Girma

No.	Pos.	Nation	Player
20	DF	ETH	Tekalign Delsho
21	MF	ETH	Henok Kasahun
23	MF	ETH	Henok Esayas Yilik
25	DF	ETH	Adamu Mehama
27	DF	ETH	Mesfin Wondimu
28	GK	ETH	Sofonyas Lema
-	FW	ETH	Endaleh Kebede
-	FW	GHA	Nuhu Faseni
-	DF	ETH	Dagmawe Abay

== Former coaches ==
- (Turkey) Mehmet Tayfun Türkmen

== Club officials ==
Chairman: (Ethiopia) Colonel Awel Abdurehim
