= Adama City FC =

Association football club in Ethiopia

Adama City
- Full name: Adama City Football Club
- Nickname: Black Lions (Leenca Gurraacha)
- Founded: 1991; 35 years ago
- Ground: Adama Stadium
- Capacity: 4,000
- Chairman: Teshome Quankusie
- Manager: Yitagesu Endale
- League: Ethiopian Premier League
- 2025–26: 15th of 16
Home colours	Away colours	Third colours

Adama City Football Club (Oromo: Garee Kubbaa Miilaa Magaalaa Adaamaa; Amharic: አዳማ ከተማ እግር ኳስ ክለብ) is an Ethiopian professional football club based in Adama, Oromia Region. The club was founded in 1991 and currently competes in the Ethiopian Premier League, the top division of Ethiopian football. Adama City has a consistent appearance in the league except the one year where the team went to relegation. Best times are when the team finishing second in 2008 and staying on top of the league on 2017–18 for a while which ended at being 5th. The women team have won the title on 2018–19 with Loza Abera and Senaf Wakuma winning the golden ball and boot respectively.

== History ==
The club was founded in 1991 (1983 E.C.) by a group of local businessmen and athletes. Adama City quickly rose through the Ethiopian football pyramid, and in 2007 they were promoted to the Ethiopian Premier League for the first time.

The club has had a mixed record in the Ethiopian Premier League, but they have consistently been one of the top teams in the country. In 2017–18, Adama City briefly held the top spot in the league table, but they eventually finished in fifth place. In August 2018, the club hired Sisay Abraham as manager and Dawit Tadesse as assistant coach. The duo led Adama City to a fifth-place finish in the 2018–19 season.

In February 2021, the club hired Zaray Mulu as its manager. Mulu is a former player of the club, and he has previously managed other Ethiopian clubs, including Hawassa City and Dedebit.

Adama City is a popular club in Ethiopia with a large fan base. The club's home stadium is the Adama Science and Technology University Stadium, which has a capacity of 12,000.

== Stadium ==
The club's home ground is Adama Science and Technology University Stadium (Adama).

== Support ==
Adama City (Ketema) enjoys a great support for its fans both at home in Adama and during away fixtures. The supporters have been involved in some altercation with some rival team supporters in the past.

== Finances ==
As of 2018, Salaries at the club have steadily risen with player like Jecko Peaze Peryze earning 165,000 Br per month. United Beverages, makers of the Ethiopian beer brand Anbessa Beer, is a sponsor of the club and in 2021 provided the club with new Jako branded Kits.

=== Sponsors ===
On March 25, 2022, Adama City football Club signed a sponsorship agreement with United Beverage for 60 million birr for 5 years.

== Departments ==
=== Active departments ===
- Women's Football Team
- Football Team (U17)
- Football Team (U20)

== Players ==
=== First-team squad ===
As of 7 March 2021

Note: Flags indicate national team as defined under FIFA eligibility rules; some limited exceptions apply. Players may hold more than one non-FIFA nationality.

No.	Pos.	Nation	Player
1	GK	ETH	Teklemariam Shanko
3	MF	ETH	Mesud Mohammed (captain)
4	DF	ETH	Hayder Sherefa
5	DF	ETH	Jemil Yakob
6	DF	ETH	Eyob Matewos
7	DF	ETH	Desta Yohannes
8	MF	ETH	Bekalu Genene
9	FW	ETH	Ame Mohammed
10	FW	ETH	Abdisa Jemal
11	MF	ETH	Wiliam Solomon
12	FW	ETH	Dawa Hotessa
13	DF	ETH	Tafese Serka
14	MF	ETH	Mujahid Mohammed
15	MF	ETH	Tsegaye Balcha
16	MF	ETH	Aklilu Tefera
17	MF	ETH	Dagim Tareknegn

No.	Pos.	Nation	Player
18	MF	ETH	Biruk Mengesha
20	DF	ETH	Desta Gichamo
21	FW	ETH	Yehualashet Fikadu
22	MF	ETH	Desalegn Debash
23	GK	ETH	Tarik Getnet
25	MF	ETH	Elias Mamo
26	MF	ETH	Elias Ahmed
27	FW	ETH	Seife Zakir
28	DF	ETH	Amin Nesru
29	FW	ETH	Habtamu Wolde
30	GK	ETH	Daniel Teshome
32	FW	ETH	Yared Birhanu
33	DF	ETH	Amsalu Mengesha
44	DF	ETH	Tigistu Abera
50	GK	ETH	Ibsa Abebe

== Club officials ==
CEO: (Ethiopia) Anbessa Megersa

=== Coaching staff ===
- Manager/Head Coach: (Ethiopia) Aschalew Hailemichael
- First Assistant coach: (Ethiopia) Degu Dubamo
- Goalkeeper coach: (Ethiopia) Ephrem Eshetu
- Team Leader: (Ethiopia) Girma Tadesse
- Physiotherapist: (Ethiopia) Yohannes Getachew

== Former coaches ==
- (Ethiopia) Wubetu Abate
- (Ethiopia) Ashenafi Bekele
- (Ethiopia) Negene Negash
- (Ethiopia) Sisay Abraham
- (Ethiopia) Aschalew Hailemichael (−2021)

== Former players ==
- (Ethiopia) Surafel Dagnachew
- (Ethiopia) Tesfaye Bekele
- (Ethiopia) Mujib Kassim
- (Ethiopia) Biruk Kalbore
