= Dire Dawa City SC =

Association football club in Ethiopia

Dire Dawa City
- Full name: Dire Dawa City Sport Club
- Nicknames: ምስራቃውያን (The Easterners) ቡርትካናማዎቹ (The Orange Ones)
- Short name: Dire Dawa Kenema
- Founded: 1982
- Ground: Dire Dawa Stadium
- Capacity: 18,000
- Manager: Asrat Abate
- League: Ethiopian Premier League
- 2025–26: Ethiopian Premier League, 17th of 16
Home colours	Away colours	Third colours

Dire Dawa City Sport Club (Amharic: ድሬዳዋ ከተማ ስፖርት ክለብ), also known as Dire Dawa Kenema, is a professional Ethiopian football club based in Dire Dawa. They play in the top division of Ethiopian football, the Ethiopian Premier League

== History ==
=== Foundation (1982–2003) ===
Dire Dawa Kenema was originally founded in 1982 (1975 E.C.) until the club went defunct.

=== New beginning (2003–present) ===
The club was reestablished in 2003 (1996 EC) with the hopes of restoring Dire Dawa's historic place in Ethiopian football. The following year (2004–05) the club played in a regional league (then considered the third tier of Ethiopian football). In 2005–06 the club entered the second tier of Ethiopian football called the Ethiopian National League (now called the Ethiopian Higher League). The club entered the Ethiopian Premier League for the first time in 2007–08 season.

Dire Dawa Kenema spent the first few season in the top division battling relegation. The club lost its best player from the 2009–10 season, Ashenafi Girma, to Meta Abo Beer F.C. during the 2010–11 season. Dire Dawa Kenema was relegated from the Premier League after the 2011–12 season.

Dire Dawa Kenema was promoted back to the Ethiopian Premier League after the 2014–15 season and managed to finish 11th in the 2015–16 season avoiding relegation. The club battled relegation in the two seasons since then and avoided relegation each time. The club signed Yosef Dengeto to a contract in March 2018. Former coach of the Ethiopian National team Yohannes Sahle signed on to coach the club on August 3, 2018.

Fisseha Teumelisan was sacked as manager of the club on February 12, 2021. After his firing, Fisseha sued the club saying that he hadn't been paid the amount that was owned to him after the termination of his contract.

== Stadiums ==
The club plays in home matches at the Dire Dawa Stadium.

== Departments ==
Dire Dawa Sport Club Academy consists of the U20 team. Players from the U20 team are often picked to fill a few roster spots at the senior level from time to time. Dire Dawa Women's Football Club plays in the first division of the Ethiopian Women's Premier League.

=== Active departments ===
- Boxing Team
- Women's Football team
- Football team (U-20)

== Players ==
=== First-team squad ===
As of 14 January 2025

Note: Flags indicate national team as defined under FIFA eligibility rules; some limited exceptions apply. Players may hold more than one non-FIFA nationality.

No.	Pos.	Nation	Player
1	GK	ETH	Abiyu Kassaye
2	MF	ETH	Zenebe Kebede
3	DF	ETH	Mesud Mohammed
4	DF	ETH	Henok Isaias
5	DF	ETH	Daniel Demssie
6	MF	ETH	Awot Gebremikael
6	DF	ETH	Fikadu Deneke
7	MF	ETH	Biniam Tesomelisan
8	MF	ETH	Surafel Getachew
9	MF	ETH	Henok Gemtessa
10	MF	ETH	Remeden Nassir
11	DF	ETH	Asrat Tunjo
12	DF	GHA	Kweku Andoh
13	FW	NAM	Itamunua Kemuine
14	MF	ETH	Yared Zewdneh
15	DF	ETH	Bereket Samuel

No.	Pos.	Nation	Player
16	MF	ETH	Minyamer Petros
17	FW	ETH	Aschalew Girma
18	DF	ETH	Wondwossen Dereje
20	FW	NAM	Junias Nandjebo
21	DF	ETH	Frezer Kassa
22	FW	GHA	Richmond Adongo
25	GK	ETH	Hamdi Tofik
27	MF	ETH	Aschenacki Lucas
28	DF	ETH	Muluken Aydagn
33	GK	ETH	Mintesinot Yegile
44	MF	ETH	Mikias Kassahun
77	FW	ETH	Samuel Zerihun
99	FW	ETH	Mudin Mussa
—	GK	ETH	Wondwossen Ashenafi

== Club officials ==
President: (Ethiopia) Eng. JEMAL IVRAHIM

Vice President: (Ethiopia) Sultan Ali

General Manager: (Ethiopia) Fitsum Kinfishe

=== Coaching and medical staff ===
As of 12 March 2021

Team Leader: (Ethiopia) Tofek Hassien

Manager/Head Coach: (Ethiopia) Zemariam Woldegiorgis

First assistant coach: (Ethiopia) Tofek Edris

Second assistant coach: (Ethiopia) Ephrem Getahun

First-team goalkeeper coach: (Ethiopia) Abaye Befekadu

Team Doctor: (Ethiopia) Asrat Legesse

== Former players ==
- (Ethiopia) Simon Abay

== Former coaches ==
- (Ethiopia) Yohannes Sahle (2018)
- (Ethiopia) Fisseha Teumelisan (2017–2021) – as assistant & head coach
- (Ethiopia) Fisseha Teumelisan
