= Sidama Coffee SC =

Association football club in Ethiopia

Sidama Coffee
- Full name: Sidama Coffee Sport Club
- Nickname: The Tigers
- Short name: SCFC
- Founded: 27 August 2006; 20 years ago
- Ground: Fura International Stadium.
- Capacity: 29,500
- Owner: Sidama Coffee Farmers Cooperatives Union
- Chairman: Ermias Tesfaye Kawisso
- Manager: Yared Gemechu.
- League: Ethiopian Premier League
- 2025–26: Champions
Home colours	Away colours	Third colours

Sidama Coffee Sport Club (Amharic: የሲዳማ ቡና ስፖርት ክለብ, Sidama Buna Sport Club), also known as Dara Kenema, is a professional football club based in Sidama municipality of Ethiopia. The club plays in the Ethiopian Premier League, the top division of Ethiopian football.

== History ==
Sidama Coffee Soccer Club was founded on August 27, 2006 (1999 E.C.) as Dara Kenema. It was one of three clubs representing Sidama Zone in the South regional championships in 2006. Dara kenema was able to advance to the championships for regional teams held in Hawassa that same year. Dara Kenema finished in the top four and by virtue entered the second division of Ethiopian football, the Higher League. The name Dara Kenama was changed to Sidama Coffee.

=== Promotion ===
Sidama Coffee won the second division Ethiopian Higher League in 2009 (2001 E.C.) earning a promotion to the Ethiopian Premier League. Sidama Coffee's first season in the Premier League was 2009–10. Sidama beat Arba Minch City 3–1 to lift 2016 South Castle Cup. Sidama forward Addis Gidey won Most Valuable Player and Top Goal Scorer for the Tournament. Sidama had one of their most successful campaigns in the 2016–17 season as the club was part of the title race until very late, before ultimately finishing 4th behind eventual champions Saint George S.C. In March 2018, the club sacked its manager Alemayehu Abayne after poor results and repeated clashes between himself and players on the team.

== Ground ==
The club play their home games at Atur Hawassa Stadium, located 14.7 miles from Shashamane.

== Players ==
=== First-team squad ===
As of 18 April 2026

Note: Flags indicate national team as defined under FIFA eligibility rules; some limited exceptions apply. Players may hold more than one non-FIFA nationality.

No.	Pos.	Nation	Player
1	GK	ETH	Fikir Wedessa
2	DF	ETH	Fetudin Jemal
3	DF	ETH	Amanuel Endale
5	DF	ETH	Mehari Mena
6	MF	ETH	Yosef Yohannes
7	DF	ETH	Shimeles Tegegn
8	FW	ETH	Habtamu Gezahegn
9	MF	ETH	Bezabeh Meleyo
10	MF	ETH	Dawit Tefera
11	FW	ETH	Addisu Atula
12	DF	ETH	Girum Assefa
14	FW	ETH	Chala Teshita
15	FW	ETH	Temesgen Bejrond
16	MF	ETH	Birhanu Ashamo
16	DF	ETH	Yared Bayeh
17	DF	ETH	Yonatan Fisseha

No.	Pos.	Nation	Player
18	MF	ETH	Biniam Lantamo
19	MF	ETH	Surafel Dagnachew
20	MF	ETH	Yonas Geremew
21	MF	ETH	Abebayehu Yohannes
23	GK	ETH	Adungna Tsegaye
24	DF	ETH	Git Gatkoch
25	DF	ETH	Kifle Kia
26	FW	ETH	Yigezu Bogale
27	FW	MLI	Mamadou Sidebe
29	MF	UGA	Yassar Mugerwa
30	GK	ETH	Mesay Ayano
31	MF	ETH	Abayne Amelo
32	DF	ETH	Sunday Mutuku
34	FW	ETH	Yared Kebede
34	DF	NGR	Lawrence Edward
44	GK	ETH	Leykun Negash

== Club officials ==
As of October 2026

President: (Ethiopia) Mengistu Sasamo

Head coach: (Ethiopia) Wondimagegn Teshome

Assistant coach: (Nigeria) Paul Ikem

Goalkeeping coach: (Ethiopia) Sintayehu Gidyelhu

== Former coaches ==
- (Ethiopia) Alemayehu Abayneh
- (Ethiopia) Zelalem Shifraw
- (Ethiopia) Zeray Mulu (2017–2021)

== Honours ==
Ethiopian Premier League: 1 (2025–26)
