= Saint George SC =

Association football club in Ethiopia

Saint George
- Full name: Saint George Sports Club
- Nicknames: ፈረሰኞቹ (The Horsemen) ሼባው (Shebaw) አርበኛው (The Patriot) አራዶቹ (The Aradas) ሳንጃው (The Bayonet)
- Founded: 1935; 91 years ago (1928; 98 years ago E.C.)
- Ground: Addis Ababa Stadium
- Capacity: 20,000
- Owner: St. George Football Association
- Chairman: Ato Abinet Gebremeskel
- Manager: Milutin “Micho” Sredojevic
- League: Ethiopian Premier League
- 2025–26: 3th of 16
- Website: www.stgeorgesa.et
| Home colours | Away colours | Third colours |

Saint George Sports Club (Amharic: ቅዱስ ጊዮርጊስ ስፖርት ክለብ, Kidus Giorgis Sport Club), otherwise known as Kidus Giorgis, is a professional football club based in Addis Ababa, Ethiopia. They play in the top division of Ethiopian football, the Ethiopian Premier League. Founded in 1935, the club was the first in Ethiopia and was established as a symbol of Ethiopian nationalism and resistance against the occupying forces of fascist Italy.

== History ==
=== Establishment and early years (1935–1944) ===
The club was founded in December 1935 (Taḫśaś 1928 E.C.) as Arada Kidus Giorgis (Saint George) Football Club by George Ducas and Ayale Atnash. The club was named after the neighborhood in which it was founded, the Arada (also called "Arada Giorgis") neighborhood of Addis Abeba. The first players to play for the club were students gathered from Ducas' and Atnash's schools, Teferi Mekonnen and Kidus Giorgis (Saint George) respectively.

Established during Fascist Italy's invasion of Ethiopia, the club quickly became the symbol of Ethiopian nationalism in the midst of Italian occupation. The patriotic struggle of the 1930s left an indelible mark on the club and the Arada neighborhood, defining both for years to come. The history of the club is often thought to be heavily influenced by this neighborhood. St George was said to have started with only 2 Tegera Birr, 1 ball, goal posts and a stamp.

Often finding it hard to play football on local pitches due to restrictions placed on them by the Arada police, the club had to constantly move from place to place. In one instance the club members tried carrying goal posts to 'Filwehameda' ( presently located next to Custom Authorities Head Office), but were ultimately chased away by authorities. Attempts to play at 'Aroge Kera' on the 'Etege Menen' field were also unsuccessful as unhappy local villagers chased them away. Then they went to 'Belay Zeleke' 'Zebegna Sefer' village, but Arada police came and chased them away once again.

Matches were organized against other local teams or groups in the area such as those of the Armenian community of Addis Ababa. However, because the club was shorthanded in the number of players, they had they ended up recruiting others to play. This is how Yidnekachew Tessema came to be a part of the team, he was found on the streets of Addis and was asked to join them for the match. It was said that he was spotted while crossing Berad Mekonnen bridge and since he went to Teferi Mekonnen School where all club members went to school, they were familiar with him. After agreeing to join them, St. George was able to beat the Armenian team 2–0 thanks to two goals by Yidnekachew himself.

The club's first jerseys were brown and white, affordable cloth for the cash strapped club at the time. One of the founders, George Ducas, used scrap together money from his parents to support the club. Others in the club would go around knocking at doors singing traditional songs like "Hoya Hoye" in order to earn money for the club. The customary reward for their singing efforts was bread, not money, but they were able collect this bread in a sack to sell it in laborers' villages to earn the money. Once the club was able to find a funding source they were able to get a new jersey that implies their unity with the Ethiopian flag colors. They gave the first jersey to the second team and started wearing the new ones until pressure from the occupying police force made them have to hide this new jersey underneath their clothing.

After buying jersey with the money, the club bought food for the players with the rest of the money. The members and players of the club would to eat bread and tea after matches and training sessions.

When Italian efforts to directly destroy St. George didn't work, they forced the club to change its name and play matches against a club the Italians had created called '6 kilo'. This club was purposely created by Italians to weaken and demoralize St. George. Sponsored by the nearby factory 'Cugnac Alovo', 6 Kilo (also called 'Cenco Maje' to mean July 5), had more money and supplies than St. George. They beat St. George on multiple occasions and St. George also did the same however those matches nearly always ended with beatings by the Arada (Italian) police.

The ongoing Guerrilla warfare during this time was of the utmost importance to the club and its members. Knowing this the Italians trying using the club as a propaganda tool for their own administration in order to confuse and entrap the guerilla fighters. The Italians sent a messages to resistance leaders like Ras. Abebe Aregay to "come and see the people is in peace" inviting him to watch a football match at JanMeda, a popular field in Addis Ababa.

Hearing this the guerilla fighters took an Italian General as leverage not trusting the Italians and Ras. Abebe Aregay sent Demissie W/Michael to investigate the situation. Having been warned beforehand to peacefully play the match, St. George was picked to play against "6 Kilo". The game quickly turned into a physical fight after kickoff with spectators often cheering and whistling to encourage the fight rather than the game. Then the game was interrupted and the Italians' plan foiled.

In 1941 when Ethiopia was liberated from fascist Italian control and Haile Selassie I had returned, it was the St. George Football club supporters along with fellow Addis Ababians that sang the national anthem "Ethiopia hoy des Yebelesh"(meaning, Rejoice Ethiopia) to welcome him back. An anthem that was written by a huge St. George supporter Yoftahe Nigussie and produced by Captain Nalbadin.

=== Ethiopian League Football (1944–1997) ===
The first officially recognized version of an Ethiopian football league was established in 1944. Originally five teams representing the various communities of Addis Ababa including St. George (Ethiopian), Fortitudo (Italian), Ararat (Armenian), Olympiakos (Greek) and the British Military Mission in Ethiopia (BMME) contested for the title which was won by the BMME. In 1947, the country's formal national league kicked off with three teams; St. George, Mechale and Ke'ay Bahir. The club remained within the league for twenty-five years before the Derg reorganized the football leagues, and forced all existing clubs to shut down. In this process the club had its name changed to Addis Ababa Brewery in 1972 only to change it back four years later. The club switched its name back and forth for 19 years until the fall of the Derg in 1991 when the club officially changed its name back to St. George. St. George enjoyed some dominance in the late 60's after which the league went through a period of relative parity in the 70's and 80's. However, during the premier league era no club has been more dominant than St. George S.C., amassing an impressive 15 titles since the start of the era in the 1997–98 season. As of 2017, the club has a combined 31 top division titles which is by far the most in Ethiopian football.

=== The Ethiopian Premier League (1997–present) ===
In October 2020, German coach Ernst Middendorp joined the club after exiting Kaizer Chiefs F.C., signing a 3-year contract. In November 2020, Middendorp resigned from his position due to concerns of political unrest in Ethiopia, he was replaced by his assistant coach Maahier Davids. After only 15 matches in charge, Davids was sacked as head coach of the club in March 2021. Scotsman Frank Nuttall was hired to replace him and guided the team to a disappointing third-place finish in the league. In July 2021, the club hired Serbian Zlatko Krmpotić as its new head coach.

== Ownership ==
The club is owned by the St. George Football Association. It is also financially supported by prominent Saudi Businessman Mohammed Hussein Al Amoudi and Ethiopian businessman Abenet Gebremeskel, who is also chairman of the club.

In June 2018 it was announced that the club would sell most of its shares to fans. In November 2020, the club announced that it had established a share company with plans to sell limited shares directly to its over 100,000 registered members.

== Supporters ==
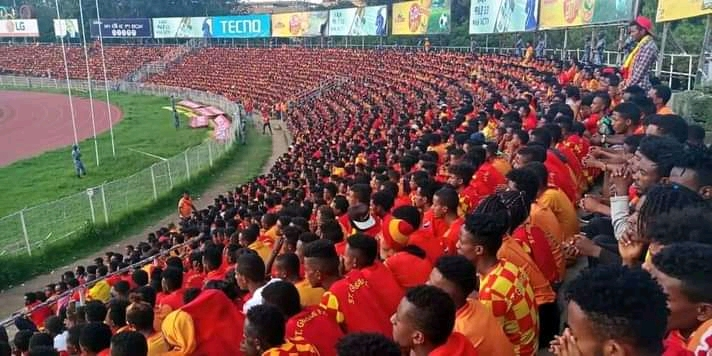
Ethiopian giant

The team's official fan club has 32,000 registered members and according to studies conducted by the fan club there is an estimated 8 million fans throughout the country and in the Ethiopian diaspora. Often singing the club's anthem and waving yellow and orange checkered flags, the supporters of Saint George provide some of the most festive atmospheres in Ethiopian football.

The ultras of the club are known to be involved in hooliganism, which is a very prevalent phenomenon in Ethiopian football. Clashes with rival support groups are common, especially during derby matches such as in the "Sheger Derby".

In the early days chants supporters of the club used to repeat went as follows:

In reference to their early rivals "6 kilo":

«ይጫወቱ ነበር በቴስታ በጋንባ፣ መገን 6 ኪሎ ተሸንፎ ገባ።» meaning "6 kilo, although playing with their legs and kicking players with headers, they always lose"

In reference to founder Ayele Atnash.

«ግጥም አይነቃነቅም የብረት ዲጂኖ፣ እንዴት ነህ አየለ የአራዳ ቴርሲኖ?» meaning "firm as a metal steal, how are you Ayele Atnash Arada's wingback"

In reference to outstanding players Elias (who later became a pilot) and Yidnekachew.

«በሰማይ ኤልያስ በምድር ይድነቃቸው፣ ለመታሰቢያነት እግዜር ፈጠራቸው።»meaning "Elias on the sky, Yidnekackew on land, God created them in tribute."

== Academy ==
In 2017, Saint George finished construction on Yidnekahew Tessema Sport Academy, the club's first youth academy, in the city of Bishoftu. The academy is named after Yidnekahew Tessema, a former Saint George and Ethiopian national team player who rose to prominence in African football as CAF president (1972 -1987). The academy, built at a cost of over 60 million ETB, lies on 24,000 hectares of land and is expected to accommodate over 100 youth players at one time. The facilities at the academy include: two football pitches, a cafeteria, a conference center, a game room, dressing rooms, a modern medical center, a gym, and dormitories. The club has an Under 17 (U17) football team.

== Grounds ==
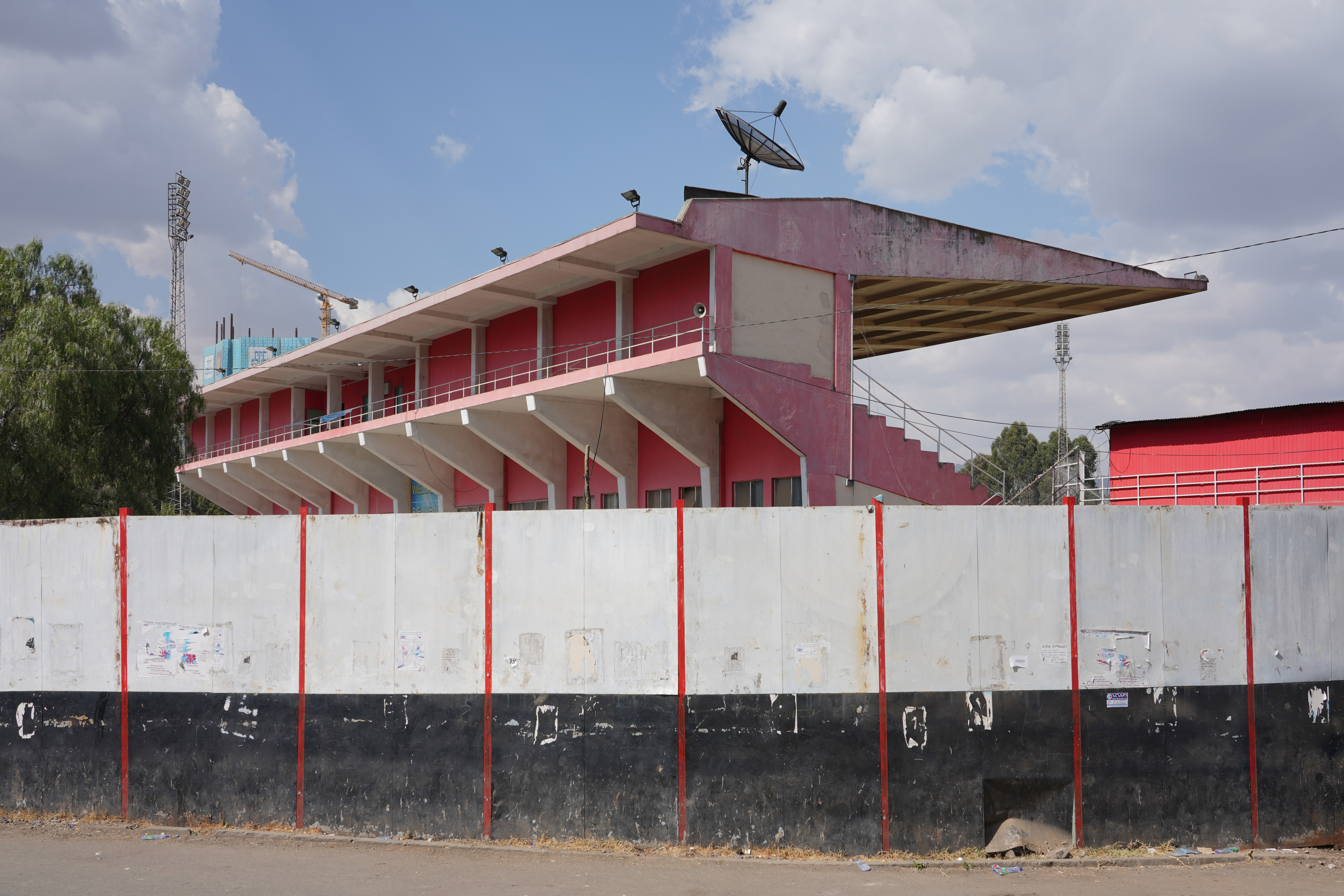
Addis Ababa Stadium in 2018

Saint George plays its home matches at Addis Ababa Stadium, also known as Yidnekachew Tessema Stadium. Due to it being the largest international standard stadium in the area, the ground is shared with many other Addis Ababa-based clubs including Ethiopian Coffee, Mechal, Addis Ababa City, Ethio Electric, and formerly CBE SA.

Since 1999, fee-paying supporters have owned St. George. In November 2007, the club had finished raising funds and would begin construction of a new stadium. Budgeted at 312 million Birr, 80% of the cost would be covered by Sheik Mohammed Al Amoudi with the balance to be contributed by the club's supporters.

== Honours ==
Saint George SC is one of Ethiopia’s most decorated football clubs, with a long history of domestic success.

=== Domestic ===
==== League ====
- First Division/Ethiopian Premier League: 31

1950, 1966, 1967, 1968, 1971, 1975, 1985, 1986, 1987, 1990, 1991, 1992, 1994, 1995, 1996, 1999, 2000, 2002, 2003, 2005, 2006, 2008, 2009, 2010, 2012, 2014, 2015, 2016, 2017, 2022, 2023

==== Cups ====
- Ethiopian Cup: 10

1952, 1953, 1957, 1973, 1974, 1977, 1993, 1999, 2011, 2016

- Ethiopian Super Cup: 16

1985, 1986, 1987,1994, 1995, 1996, 1999, 2001, 2002, 2003, 2005, 2006, 2009, 2010, 2015, 2017

- Addis Ababa City Cup: 8

2009, 2010, 2011, 2013, 2017, 2019, 2022, 2025

=== African ===
- CAF Champions League: 9 appearances

1997 – First Round
2000 – First Round
2001 – First Round

2003 – Preliminary Round
2004 – First Round
2006 – First Round

2007 – First Round
2010 – Preliminary Round
2011 – Preliminary Round
2013 – Preliminary Round
2015 – Preliminary Round
2016 – First Round
2017 - Group Stage (Top 16)
2018 – Second Round
2022 – First Round
2023 – Second Round

- African Cup of Champions Clubs: 10 appearances

1967 – Semi-Final
1968 – First Round
1969 – First Round
1972 – Second Round

1976 – First Round
1986 – Second Round
1991 – withdrew in First Round
1992 – Preliminary Round

1993 – Preliminary Round
1996 – Second Round

- CAF Confederation Cup: 1 appearance

2012 – First Round

- CAF Cup: 1 appearance

2002 – Second Round

- CAF Cup Winners' Cup: 3 appearances

1975 – First Round
1978 – Preliminary Round
1994 – Second Round

== Sponsors and corporate partners ==
Saint George SC has received financial support and corporate backing from several Ethiopian businesses. Companies reported as supporting the club or represented on its interim board include:

- MIDROC
- BGI Ethiopia
- Dashen Bank
- Yango Group
- MOHA Soft Drinks Industry: (associated with Pepsi products)
- Gofere Sportswear
- Hiland spring water
- Yene Health: (associated with Lyte Electrolyte hydration Drink)

== Players ==
=== Current squad ===
As of 23 October 2025

=== Goalkeepers ===
| No. | Pos. | Nation | Player |
|---|---|---|---|
| 1 | GK | ETH | Biniyam Genetu |
| 22 | GK | ETH | Kok Kueth |
| 30 | GK | ETH | Tsion Merid |

=== Defenders ===
| No. | Pos. | Nation | Player |
|---|---|---|---|
| 2 | DF | ETH | Aminu Nesru |
| 3 | DF | ETH | Tewodros Assefa |
| 4 | DF | ETH | Mesafint Pawlos |
| 5 | DF | ETH | Biruk Tarekegn |
| 11 | DF | ETH | Henok Yohannes |
| 13 | DF | ETH | Shahidu Mustefa (Vice-Captain) |
| 15 | DF | ETH | Ashenafi Getachew |
| 17 | DF | ETH | Biniyam Bekele |
| 21 | DF | ETH | Yared Yemane |
| 28 | DF | ETH | Tsega-ab Gizaw |
| 44 | DF | ETH | Abdulhamid Mubarek |

=== Midfielders ===
| No. | Pos. | Nation | Player |
|---|---|---|---|
| 6 | MF | ETH | Fuad Abdela |
| 16 | MF | ETH | Biruk Endale |
| 18 | MF | ETH | Biruk Belachew |
| 23 | MF | ETH | Habtamu Gulilat |
| 24 | MF | ETH | Fanuel Adamu |
| 40 | MF | ETH | Amir Misbah |
| 41 | MF | ETH | Yabsira Gossaye |

=== Forwards ===
| No. | Pos. | Nation | Player |
|---|---|---|---|
| 7 | FW | ETH | Temesgen Birhanu |
| 9 | FW | ETH | Tegenu Teshome |
| 10 | FW | ETH | Natnael Daniel |
| 12 | FW | ETH | Amanuel Erbo |
| 14 | FW | ETH | Tsega Kedir |
| 19 | FW | ETH | Aron Ante Logen |
| 20 | FW | ETH | Kiber Aklilu |
| 25 | FW | ETH | Biruk Alemayehu |
| 31 | FW | ETH | Bilal Gemeda |
| 47 | FW | ETH | Enyew Seleshi |

=== Former players ===
Further Information: List of Saint George S.C. players

== Club officials ==
Club patron: (Ethiopia) (Saudi Arabia) Mohammed Hussein Al-Amoudi

- President: (Ethiopia) Nesibu Chako
- Vise President and General Secretary: (Ethiopia) Yohannes Million
- Communications and External Relations Director: (Ethiopia) Behaylu Ayele
- General Manager: (Ethiopia) Dr. Fitsum Kasaye
- Technique Director: (Ethiopia) Seyoum Kebede
- Public Relation Officer: (Ethiopia) Abel Gebrekidan
- Team Leader: (Ethiopia) Yohannes Yakob

=== Coaching and medical Staff ===
- Head Coach: (Serbia) Milutin “Micho” Sredojevic
- Assistant Coach: (Ethiopia) Adane Girma
- Assistant Coach: (Ethiopia) Samson Mulgeta
- Video Analist: (Ethiopia) Ephrem Gizaw
- GK Coach: (Ethiopia) Daniel W/Mariam
- Medical Staff: (Ethiopia) Melkamu Tadesse

== Former coaches ==
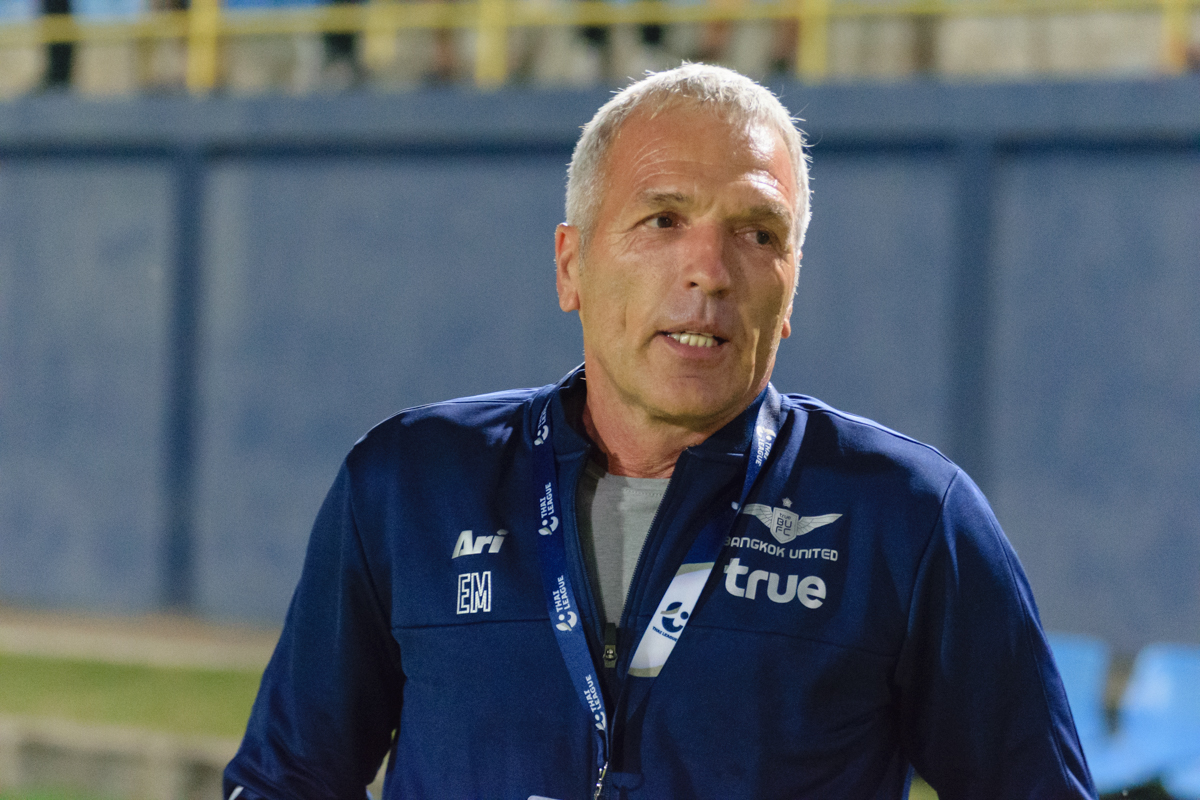
Ernst Middendorp became the manager of St. George SC

- (Ethiopia) Fasil Tekalign (2024-2026)
- (Ethiopia) Zerihun Shengeta (2021-2024)
- (Serbia) Zlatko Krampotich (2021)
- (Scotland) Frank Nuttall (2021)
- (South Africa) Maahier Davids (2020–2021)
- (Germany) Ernst Middendorp (2020)
- (Serbia) Srdan Zivojnov (2019–2020)
- (England) Stewart Hall (2018–2019)
- (Brazil) Neider dos Santos (2014–2017)
- (Serbia) Dusan Kondic (2011)
- (Italy) Giuseppe Dossena (2010–11)
- (Serbia) Milutin “Micho” Sredojevic (2007–2010)
- (Ethiopia) Yidnekatchew Tessema
- (Eritrea) / (Italy) Luciano Vassallo
