= 2014 CAF Champions League qualifying rounds =

- Dates: 7 February – 30 March 2014

The qualifying rounds of the 2014 CAF Champions League were played from 7 February to 30 March 2014, to decide the eight teams which advanced to the group stage.

== Draw ==
The draw for the preliminary, first and second qualifying rounds was held on 16 December 2013 in Marrakesh, Morocco. The entry round of each team was determined by their ranking points calculated based on performances in continental club championships for the period 2009–2013.

The following 58 teams were entered into the draw:

Byes to first round	Entrants to preliminary round
(Egypt) Al-Ahly (57 pts); (Tunisia) Espérance de Tunis (54 pts); (Democratic Republic of the Congo) TP Mazembe (42 pts); (Tunisia) CS Sfaxien (26 pts); (Sudan) Al-Hilal (24 pts); (Cameroon) Coton Sport (21 pts)	(Republic of the Congo) AC Léopards (21 pts); (Mali) Stade Malien (18 pts); (Egypt) Zamalek (14 pts); (Algeria) ES Sétif (12 pts); (Ivory Coast) Séwé Sport (10 pts); (Nigeria) Enyimba (9 pts); (Sudan) Al-Merrikh (9 pts); (Ghana) Berekum Chelsea (8 pts); (Nigeria) Kano Pillars (3 pts); (Morocco) Raja Casablanca (3 pts); (Zimbabwe) Dynamos (2 pts); (Democratic Republic of the Congo) AS Vita Club (1 pt); (Angola) Primeiro de Agosto (1 pt); (Morocco) FAR Rabat; (Mali) AS Real Bamako; (Republic of the Congo) Diables Noirs; (Angola) Kabuscorp; (Cameroon) Les Astres; (Ghana) Asante Kotoko; (Zambia) Nkana; (Libya) Al-Ahly Benghazi; (Niger) AS Douanes Niamey; (Botswana) Mochudi Centre Chiefs; (Burkina Faso) ASFA Yennenga; (Burundi) Flambeau de l’Est; (Chad) Foullah Edifice; (Comoros) Komorozine; (Equatorial Guinea) Akonangui; (Ethiopia) Dedebit; (Gabon) US Bitam; (The Gambia) Steve Biko; (Guinea) Horoya; (Guinea-Bissau) Os Balantas; (Kenya) Gor Mahia; (Lesotho) Lioli; (Liberia) Barrack Young Controllers; (Madagascar) CNaPS Sport; (Mauritania) Nouadhibou; (Mozambique) Liga Muçulmana; (Namibia) Black Africa; (Rwanda) Rayon Sports; (São Tomé and Príncipe) Sporting Praia Cruz; (Senegal) Diambars; (Seychelles) Côte d'Or; (Sierra Leone) Diamond Stars; (South Africa) Kaizer Chiefs; (South Sudan) Atlabara; (Eswatini) Mbabane Swallows; (Tanzania) Young Africans; (Togo) Anges de Notsè; (Uganda) Kampala City Council; (Zanzibar) KMKM

== Format ==
Qualification ties were played on a home-and-away two-legged basis. If the sides were level on aggregate after the second leg, the away goals rule was applied, and if still level, the tie proceeded directly to a penalty shoot-out (no extra time was played).

== Schedule ==
The schedule of each round was as follows.

Round	First leg	Second leg
Preliminary round	7–9 February 2014	14–16 February 2014
First round	28 February–2 March 2014	7–9 March 2014
Second round	21–23 March 2014	28–30 March 2014

== Preliminary round ==
The preliminary round included the 52 teams that did not receive byes to the first round.

Team 1	Agg.	Team 2	1st leg	2nd leg
Young Africans (Tanzania)	12–2	(Comoros) Komorozine	7–0	5–2
Berekum Chelsea (Ghana)	2–2 (3–0 p)	(South Sudan) Atlabara	2–0	0–2
Al-Ahly Benghazi (Libya)	4–2	(Chad) Foullah Edifice	4–0	0–2
Gor Mahia (Kenya)	1–1 (4–2 p)	(Gabon) US Bitam	1–0	0–1
Enyimba (Nigeria)	4–3	(Togo) Anges de Notsè	3–1	1–2
FAR Rabat (Morocco)	3–3 (a)	(Mali) AS Real Bamako	2–2	1–1
Les Astres (Cameroon)	4–0	(Equatorial Guinea) Akonangui	3–0	1–0
Asante Kotoko (Ghana)	2–2 (a)	(Liberia) Barrack Young Controllers	2–1	0–1
Séwé Sport (Ivory Coast)	w/o	(Guinea-Bissau) Os Balantas	—	—
Dedebit (Ethiopia)	3–2	(Zanzibar) KMKM	3–0	0–2
Nouadhibou (Mauritania)	1–4	(Guinea) Horoya	1–1	0–3
Raja Casablanca (Morocco)	8–1	(Sierra Leone) Diamond Stars	6–0	2–1
Diables Noirs (Republic of the Congo)	1–2	(Burundi) Flambeau de l’Est	0–1	1–1
ES Sétif (Algeria)	w/o	(The Gambia) Steve Biko	—	—
Diambars (Senegal)	1–1 (2–4 p)	(Burkina Faso) ASFA Yennenga	1–0	0–1
Sporting Praia Cruz (São Tomé and Príncipe)	3–7	(Mali) Stade Malien	3–2	0–5
AC Léopards (Republic of the Congo)	2–2 (a)	(Rwanda) Rayon Sports	0–0	2–2
Primeiro de Agosto (Angola)	3–2	(Lesotho) Lioli	2–0	1–2
Kaizer Chiefs (South Africa)	4–1	(Namibia) Black Africa	3–0	1–1
Liga Muçulmana (Mozambique)	1–0	(Madagascar) CNaPS Sport	1–0	0–0
Dynamos (Zimbabwe)	4–1	(Botswana) Mochudi Centre Chiefs	3–0	1–1
AS Vita Club (Democratic Republic of the Congo)	4–3	(Nigeria) Kano Pillars	3–1	1–2
Zamalek (Egypt)	3–0	(Niger) AS Douanes Niamey	2–0	1–0
Kabuscorp (Angola)	7–2	(Seychelles) Côte d'Or	5–1	2–1
Mbabane Swallows (Eswatini)	4–5	(Zambia) Nkana	2–0	2–5
Al-Merrikh (Sudan)	2–3	(Uganda) Kampala City Council	0–2	2–1

8 February 2014
16:00 UTC+3

Young Africans (Tanzania)	7–0	(Comoros) Komorozine
Ngasa 14', 65', 68'; Haroub 20'; Kavumbagu 57', 80'; Kiiza 60'	Report

Benjamin Mkapa National Stadium, Dar-es-Salaam
Referee: Hassan Mohamed Hagi (Somalia)
15 February 2014
15:00 UTC+3

Komorozine (Comoros)	2–5	(Tanzania) Young Africans
Anli 41'; Ismael 77'	Report	Kiiza 13'; Ngasa 22', 87', 90'; Msuva 37'

Stade Said Mohamed Cheikh, Mitsamiouli
Referee: Allister Barra (Seychelles)

Young Africans won 12–2 on aggregate and advanced to the first round.

9 February 2014
15:00 UTC±0

Berekum Chelsea (Ghana)	2–0	(South Sudan) Atlabara
J. Owusu 53' (pen.), 90'	Report

Berekum Sports Stadium, Berekum
Referee: Antoine Effa Essouma (Cameroon)
16 February 2014
16:00 UTC+3

Atlabara (South Sudan)	2–0	(Ghana) Berekum Chelsea
Adams 61' (o.g.); Wani 72'	Report
Penalties
	0–3

Khartoum Stadium, Khartoum (Sudan)
Referee: Djamal Aden (Djibouti)

Note: The second leg was played outside of South Sudan due to security concerns.
2–2 on aggregate. Berekum Chelsea won the penalty shoot-out and advanced to the first round.

7 February 2014
14:00 UTC+1

Al-Ahly Benghazi (Libya)	4–0	(Chad) Foullah Edifice
Sadomba 26', 87'; Fetori 55' (pen.); Al Mehdi 71'	Report

Stade Chedli Zouiten, Tunis (Tunisia)
Referee: Hicham Tiazi (Morocco)
16 February 2014
14:00 UTC+1

Foullah Edifice (Chad)	2–0	(Libya) Al-Ahly Benghazi
Matibeye 18', 63'	Report

Stade Omnisports Idriss Mahamat Ouya, N'Djamena
Referee: Oumarou Alain Ouedraogo (Burkina Faso)

Note: The first leg was played outside of Libya due to security concerns.
Al-Ahly Benghazi won 4–2 on aggregate and advanced to the first round.

8 February 2014
16:00 UTC+3

Gor Mahia (Kenya)	1–0	(Gabon) US Bitam
Sserunkuma 76' (pen.)	Report

Nyayo National Stadium, Nairobi
Referee: Denis Batte (Uganda)
16 February 2014
16:00 UTC+1

US Bitam (Gabon)	1–0	(Kenya) Gor Mahia
Massamba 12'	Report
Penalties
	2–4

Stade Gaston Peyrille, Bitam
Referee: Jerry Yekeh (Liberia)

1–1 on aggregate. Gor Mahia won the penalty shoot-out and advanced to the first round.

9 February 2014
16:00 UTC+1

Enyimba (Nigeria)	3–1	(Togo) Anges de Notsè
Gwar 82', 90'; Sokari 85'	Report	Tchalla 41'

Enyimba International Stadium, Aba
Referee: Bienvenu Sinko (Ivory Coast)
16 February 2014
15:00 UTC±0

Anges de Notsè (Togo)	2–1	(Nigeria) Enyimba
Laba 29'; Tchalla 80'	Report	Bashir 66'

Stade Municipal, Lomé
Referee: Falou Galasse Kane (Senegal)

Enyimba won 4–3 on aggregate and advanced to the first round.

8 February 2014
15:00 UTC±0

FAR Rabat (Morocco)	2–2	(Mali) AS Real Bamako
Biat 85'; Aqqal 90+6'	Report	Doumbia 77'; Cissé 79'

Prince Moulay Abdellah Stadium, Rabat
Referee: Mohamed Ragab Omar (Libya)
15 February 2014
16:30 UTC±0

AS Real Bamako (Mali)	1–1	(Morocco) FAR Rabat
Coulibaly 5'	Report	Aqqal 48'

Stade Modibo Kéïta, Bamako
Referee: Ferdinand Udoh (Nigeria)

3–3 on aggregate. AS Real Bamako won on the away goals rule and advanced to the first round.

9 February 2014
15:30 UTC+1

Les Astres (Cameroon)	3–0	(Equatorial Guinea) Akonangui
Namatchoua 15'; Fossouo 19', 78'	Report

Stade de la Réunification, Douala
Referee: Yves Roponat (Gabon)
16 February 2014
15:00 UTC+1

Akonangui (Equatorial Guinea)	0–1	(Cameroon) Les Astres
	Report	Ebah 75'

Estadio de Bata, Bata
Referee: Adam Cordier (Chad)

Les Astres won 4–0 on aggregate and advanced to the first round.

9 February 2014
15:30 UTC±0

Asante Kotoko (Ghana)	2–1	(Liberia) Barrack Young Controllers
Adusei 38' (pen.), 72' (pen.)	Report	Pupo 40'

Baba Yara Stadium, Kumasi
Referee: Boukari Ouedraogo (Burkina Faso)
16 February 2014
16:00 UTC±0

Barrack Young Controllers (Liberia)	1–0	(Ghana) Asante Kotoko
Nimely 87'	Report

Antoinette Tubman Stadium, Monrovia
Referee: Mohamed Hamada (Mauritania)

2–2 on aggregate. Barrack Young Controllers won on the away goals rule and advanced to the first round.

8 February 2014

Séwé Sport (Ivory Coast)	Cancelled	(Guinea-Bissau) Os Balantas
	Report

Stade Robert Champroux, Abidjan
Referee: Brice Igue (Benin)
15 February 2014

Os Balantas (Guinea-Bissau)	Cancelled	(Ivory Coast) Séwé Sport
	Report

Estádio 24 de Setembro, Bissau
Referee: Baba Leno (Guinea)

Séwé Sport advanced to the first round after Os Balantas withdrew.

9 February 2014
16:00 UTC+3

Dedebit (Ethiopia)	3–0	(Zanzibar) KMKM
Fekadu 16'; Gugsa 52'; George 84'	Report

Addis Ababa Stadium, Addis Ababa
Referee: Badr El Din Abdel Ghadir (Sudan)
16 February 2014
16:00 UTC+3

KMKM (Zanzibar)	2–0	(Ethiopia) Dedebit
Kapenta 3'; Muhibu 56'	Report

Amaan Stadium, Zanzibar City
Referee: Alex Nsulumbi (Uganda)

Dedebit won 3–2 on aggregate and advanced to the first round.

8 February 2014
16:00 UTC±0

Nouadhibou (Mauritania)	1–1	(Guinea) Horoya
Traoré 14'	Report	Nikièma 40'

Stade Olympique, Nouakchott
Referee: Tangba Kambou (Ivory Coast)
16 February 2014
16:30 UTC±0

Horoya (Guinea)	3–0	(Mauritania) Nouadhibou
Keïta 33'; Camara 90'; Soumah 90+2'	Report

Stade du 28 Septembre, Conakry
Referee: Victor Manuel Rocha Lima (Cape Verde)

Horoya won 4–1 on aggregate and advanced to the first round.

7 February 2014
19:00 UTC±0

Raja Casablanca (Morocco)	6–0	(Sierra Leone) Diamond Stars
Iajour 8', 47', 66', 82'; Hafidi 22'; El Ouadi 55'	Report

Stade Mohamed V, Casablanca
Referee: Gomno Daouda (Niger)
15 February 2014
16:30 UTC±0

Diamond Stars (Sierra Leone)	1–2	(Morocco) Raja Casablanca
Fofanah 83'	Report	Mabidé 54'; Zemmama 90'

National Stadium, Freetown
Referee: Daouda Kebe (Senegal)

Raja Casablanca won 8–1 on aggregate and advanced to the first round.

8 February 2014
15:00 UTC+1

Diables Noirs (Republic of the Congo)	0–1	(Burundi) Flambeau de l’Est
	Report	Hakizimana 90'

Stade Alphonse Massemba-Débat, Brazzaville
Referee: Alhadi Mahamat (Chad)
15 February 2014
15:30 UTC+2

Flambeau de l’Est (Burundi)	1–1	(Republic of the Congo) Diables Noirs
Moussa 85'	Report	Binguila 32'

Prince Louis Rwagasore Stadium, Bujumbura
Referee: Tessema Bamlak (Ethiopia)

Flambeau de l’Est won 2–1 on aggregate and advanced to the first round.

9 February 2014

ES Sétif (Algeria)	Cancelled	(The Gambia) Steve Biko
	Report

Stade 8 Mai 1945, Sétif
Referee: Youssef Essrayri (Tunisia)
16 February 2014

Steve Biko (The Gambia)	Cancelled	(Algeria) ES Sétif
	Report

Box Bar Stadium, Brikama
Referee: Kossi Sedjro (Togo)

ES Sétif advanced to the first round after Steve Biko withdrew.

8 February 2014
16:30 UTC±0

Diambars (Senegal)	1–0	(Burkina Faso) ASFA Yennenga
Keita 75'	Report

Stade Caroline Faye, M'Bour
Referee: Henry Ogunyamodi (Nigeria)
15 February 2014
15:30 UTC±0

ASFA Yennenga (Burkina Faso)	1–0	(Senegal) Diambars
Nabi 75'	Report
Penalties
	4–2

Stade du 4-Août, Ouagadougou
Referee: Ousmane Karembe (Mali)

1–1 on aggregate. ASFA Yennenga won the penalty shoot-out and advanced to the first round.

8 February 2014
15:30 UTC±0

Sporting Praia Cruz (São Tomé and Príncipe)	3–2	(Mali) Stade Malien
Jair 25' (pen.), 80'; Zé 70'	Report	Sissoko 40', 55'

Estádio Nacional 12 de Julho, São Tomé
Referee: Sheriff Njie (Gambia)
16 February 2014
17:00 UTC±0

Stade Malien (Mali)	5–0	(São Tomé and Príncipe) Sporting Praia Cruz
L. Diawara 19', 30', 73'; Sissoko 26' (pen.); M. Diawara 90+4' (pen.)	Report

Stade Modibo Kéïta, Bamako
Referee: Mohamed Farouk Mahmoud (Egypt)

Stade Malien won 7–3 on aggregate and advanced to the first round.

9 February 2014
15:30 UTC+1

AC Léopards (Republic of the Congo)	0–0	(Rwanda) Rayon Sports
	Report

Stade Denis Sassou Nguesso, Dolisie
Referee: Jean-Jacques Ndala Ngambo (Congo DR)
15 February 2014
15:30 UTC+2

Rayon Sports (Rwanda)	2–2	(Republic of the Congo) AC Léopards
Moubhibo 45' (o.g.); Amissi 45+3'	Report	Gandzé 57'; Cissé 59'

Amahoro Stadium, Kigali
Referee: Israel Mujuni (Tanzania)

2–2 on aggregate. AC Léopards won on the away goals rule and advanced to the first round.

8 February 2014
17:00 UTC+1

Primeiro de Agosto (Angola)	2–0	(Lesotho) Lioli
Amaro 5'; Mateus 74'	Report

Estádio 11 de Novembro, Luanda
Referee: Nelson Fred (Seychelles)
16 February 2014
15:00 UTC+2

Lioli (Lesotho)	2–1	(Angola) Primeiro de Agosto
Kloete 38' (pen.); Sello 82'	Report	Afonso 5'

Setsoto Stadium, Maseru
Referee: Norman Matemera (Zimbabwe)

Primeiro de Agosto won 3–2 on aggregate and advanced to the first round.

8 February 2014
20:00 UTC+2

Kaizer Chiefs (South Africa)	3–0	(Namibia) Black Africa
Masango 18'; Nkhatha 32', 86'	Report

FNB Stadium, Johannesburg
Referee: Ruzive Ruzive (Zimbabwe)
15 February 2014
20:00 UTC+2

Black Africa (Namibia)	1–1	(South Africa) Kaizer Chiefs
Stephanus 58'	Report	Nkhatha 10'

Independence Stadium, Windhoek
Referee: Hélder Martins de Carvalho (Angola)

Kaizer Chiefs won 4–1 on aggregate and advanced to the first round.

8 February 2014
15:00 UTC+2

Liga Muçulmana (Mozambique)	1–0	(Madagascar) CNaPS Sport
Sonito 15'	Report

Estádio Da Liga Muçulmana, Matola
Referee: Lekgotia Johannes (Botswana)
16 February 2014
14:30 UTC+3

CNaPS Sport (Madagascar)	0–0	(Mozambique) Liga Muçulmana
	Report

Mahamasina Municipal Stadium, Antananarivo
Referee: Kulasande Qongqo (South Africa)

Liga Muçulmana won 1–0 on aggregate and advanced to the first round.

9 February 2014
15:00 UTC+2

Dynamos (Zimbabwe)	3–0	(Botswana) Mochudi Centre Chiefs
Pakamisa 48', 71' (pen.); Mambare 78'	Report

National Sports Stadium, Harare
Referee: Aníbal António (Mozambique)
16 February 2014
16:00 UTC+2

Mochudi Centre Chiefs (Botswana)	1–1	(Zimbabwe) Dynamos
Tshekiso 73'	Report	Chitiyo 43'

Botswana National Stadium, Gaborone
Referee: Andreas Helmut (Namibia)

Dynamos won 4–1 on aggregate and advanced to the first round.

9 February 2014
15:30 UTC+1

AS Vita Club (Democratic Republic of the Congo)	3–1	(Nigeria) Kano Pillars
Mubele 11'; Basisila 45'; Mabidi 56'	Report	Ali 31'

Stade Tata Raphaël, Kinshasa
Referee: Jean Marie Koyakobo (Central African Republic)
15 February 2014
16:00 UTC+1

Kano Pillars (Nigeria)	2–1	(Democratic Republic of the Congo) AS Vita Club
Umar 67'; Haruna 70'	Report	Etekiama 3'

Sani Abacha Stadium, Kano
Referee: Lalidia Souleymane (Niger)

AS Vita Club won 4–3 on aggregate and advanced to the first round.

9 February 2014
18:45 UTC+2

Zamalek (Egypt)	2–0	(Niger) AS Douanes Niamey
Ibrahim 35' (pen.); Zakaria 85'	Report

Cairo International Stadium, Cairo
Attendance: 10,000
Referee: Noureddine El Jaafari (Morocco)
16 February 2014
16:00 UTC+1

AS Douanes Niamey (Niger)	0–1	(Egypt) Zamalek
	Report	Emam 65'

Stade Général Seyni Kountché, Niamey
Referee: Aurélien Juenkou (Cameroon)

Zamalek won 3–0 on aggregate and advanced to the first round.

8 February 2014
16:00 UTC+1

Kabuscorp (Angola)	5–1	(Seychelles) Côte d'Or
Lami 33'; Breco 43'; Love 57'; Mputu 63' (pen.); Lunguinha 69'	Report	Basset 51'

Estádio dos Coqueiros, Luanda
Referee: Dennis Nguluwe (Malawi)
15 February 2014
15:00 UTC+4

Côte d'Or (Seychelles)	1–2	(Angola) Kabuscorp
Labiche 88'	Report	Saviola 12'; Mpele Mpele 80'

Stade Linité, Victoria
Referee: Abdoul Kanoso (Madagascar)

Kabuscorp won 7–2 on aggregate and advanced to the first round.

9 February 2014
15:00 UTC+2

Mbabane Swallows (Eswatini)	2–0	(Zambia) Nkana
Matanda 61'; Badenhorst 66'	Report

Somhlolo National Stadium, Lobamba
Referee: Sentso Mohau (Lesotho)
15 February 2014
15:00 UTC+2

Nkana (Zambia)	5–2	(Eswatini) Mbabane Swallows
Kampamba 19', 29' (pen.); S. Bwalya 31', 63', 77'	Report	Matanda 5'; Nhleko 71'

Nkana Stadium, Kitwe
Referee: Tirelo Mositwane (Botswana)

Nkana won 5–4 on aggregate and advanced to the first round.

8 February 2014
17:00 UTC+3

Al-Merrikh (Sudan)	0–2	(Uganda) Kampala City Council
	Report	Wasswa 20'; Odur 22'

Khartoum Stadium, Khartoum
Referee: Luelseghed Ghebremichael (Eritrea)
15 February 2014
16:00 UTC+3

Kampala City Council (Uganda)	1–2	(Sudan) Al-Merrikh
Odur 7'	Report	El-Basha 40'; Traoré 76'

National Stadium, Kampala
Referee: Thierry Nkurunziza (Burundi)

Kampala City Council won 3–2 on aggregate and advanced to the first round.

== First round ==
The first round included 32 teams: the 26 winners of the preliminary round, and the 6 teams that received byes to this round.

Team 1	Agg.	Team 2	1st leg	2nd leg
Young Africans (Tanzania)	1–1 (3–4 p)	(Egypt) Al-Ahly	1–0	0–1
Berekum Chelsea (Ghana)	1–3	(Libya) Al-Ahly Benghazi	1–1	0–2
Gor Mahia (Kenya)	2–8	(Tunisia) Espérance de Tunis	2–3	0–5
Enyimba (Nigeria)	2–2 (a)	(Mali) AS Real Bamako	1–2	1–0
Les Astres (Cameroon)	1–4	(Democratic Republic of the Congo) TP Mazembe	1–1	0–3
Barrack Young Controllers (Liberia)	3–4	(Ivory Coast) Séwé Sport	3–3	0–1
Dedebit (Ethiopia)	1–4	(Tunisia) CS Sfaxien	1–2	0–2
Horoya (Guinea)	1–1 (5–4 p)	(Morocco) Raja Casablanca	1–0	0–1
Flambeau de l’Est (Burundi)	1–5	(Cameroon) Coton Sport	1–0	0–5
ES Sétif (Algeria)	5–0	(Burkina Faso) ASFA Yennenga	5–0	0–0
Stade Malien (Mali)	0–2	(Sudan) Al-Hilal	0–0	0–2
AC Léopards (Republic of the Congo)	4–3	(Angola) Primeiro de Agosto	4–1	0–2
Kaizer Chiefs (South Africa)	7–0	(Mozambique) Liga Muçulmana	4–0	3–0
Dynamos (Zimbabwe)	0–1	(Democratic Republic of the Congo) AS Vita Club	0–0	0–1
Zamalek (Egypt)	1–0	(Angola) Kabuscorp	1–0	0–0
Nkana (Zambia)	4–3	(Uganda) Kampala City Council	2–2	2–1

1 March 2014
16:00 UTC+3

Young Africans (Tanzania)	1–0	(Egypt) Al-Ahly
Haroub 82'	Report

Benjamin Mkapa National Stadium, Dar-es-Salaam
Referee: Bazezew Belete (Ethiopia)
9 March 2014
19:00 UTC+2

Al-Ahly (Egypt)	1–0	(Tanzania) Young Africans
Moawad 71'	Report
Penalties
	4–3

Harras El-Hedoud Stadium, Alexandria
Attendance: 0
Referee: Badara Diatta (Senegal)

1–1 on aggregate. Al-Ahly won the penalty shoot-out and advanced to the second round.

2 March 2014
15:00 UTC±0

Berekum Chelsea (Ghana)	1–1	(Libya) Al-Ahly Benghazi
O. Owusu 90+5'	Report	Jabason 57'

Berekum Sports Stadium, Berekum
Referee: Ousmane Karembe (Mali)
9 March 2014
14:00 UTC+1

Al-Ahly Benghazi (Libya)	2–0	(Ghana) Berekum Chelsea
Zuway 26'; Sadomba 37'	Report

Stade Chedli Zouiten, Tunis (Tunisia)
Referee: Abubakar Ago (Nigeria)

Note: The second leg was played outside of Libya due to security concerns.
Al-Ahly Benghazi won 3–1 on aggregate and advanced to the second round.

1 March 2014
16:00 UTC+3

Gor Mahia (Kenya)	2–3	(Tunisia) Espérance de Tunis
Sserunkuma 13' (pen.); Shakava 77'	Report	Akaïchi 25'; N'Djeng 62'; Jouini 89'

Nyayo National Stadium, Nairobi
Referee: Bouchaïb El Ahrach (Morocco)
10 March 2014
16:00 UTC+1

Espérance de Tunis (Tunisia)	5–0	(Kenya) Gor Mahia
Jouini 45', 49', 57'; Afful 55'; Mhirsi 75'	Report

Stade Olympique de Radès, Radès
Referee: Daniel Bennett (South Africa)

Note: The second leg was postponed from 9 March 2014 due to torrential rains.
Espérance de Tunis won 8–2 on aggregate and advanced to the second round.

2 March 2014
16:00 UTC+1

Enyimba (Nigeria)	1–2	(Mali) AS Real Bamako
Gwar 44'	Report	Cissé 64'; Samaké 76'

Enyimba International Stadium, Aba
Referee: Mohamed Farouk Mahmoud (Egypt)
8 March 2014
17:00 UTC±0

AS Real Bamako (Mali)	0–1	(Nigeria) Enyimba
	Report	Zakka 23'

Stade Modibo Kéïta, Bamako
Referee: Bakary Camara (Gambia)

2–2 on aggregate. AS Real Bamako won on the away goals rule and advanced to the second round.

2 March 2014
15:30 UTC+1

Les Astres (Cameroon)	1–1	(Democratic Republic of the Congo) TP Mazembe
Namatchoua 75'	Report	Sakuwaha 65' (pen.)

Stade de la Réunification, Douala
Referee: Bakary Gassama (Gambia)
9 March 2014
15:30 UTC+2

TP Mazembe (Democratic Republic of the Congo)	3–0	(Cameroon) Les Astres
Coulibaly 31'; Bolingi 37'; Sakuwaha 50'	Report

Stade TP Mazembe, Lubumbashi
Referee: Denis Batte (Uganda)

TP Mazembe won 4–1 on aggregate and advanced to the second round.

2 March 2014
16:00 UTC±0

Barrack Young Controllers (Liberia)	3–3	(Ivory Coast) Séwé Sport
Pupo 39'; Nimely 63'; Saydee 85'	Report	Dembélé 9'; Kouamé 24'; Kouao 53'

Antoinette Tubman Stadium, Monrovia
Referee: Djamel Haimoudi (Algeria)
9 March 2014
15:30 UTC±0

Séwé Sport (Ivory Coast)	1–0	(Liberia) Barrack Young Controllers
Assalé 44'	Report

Stade Robert Champroux, Abidjan
Referee: Daudu Williams (Sierra Leone)

Séwé Sport won 4–3 on aggregate and advanced to the second round.

2 March 2014
16:00 UTC+3

Dedebit (Ethiopia)	1–2	(Tunisia) CS Sfaxien
Fekadu 35'	Report	Ben Youssef 30'; Derbali 74'

Addis Ababa Stadium, Addis Ababa
Referee: Davies Omweno (Kenya)
9 March 2014
15:00 UTC+1

CS Sfaxien (Tunisia)	2–0	(Ethiopia) Dedebit
Ben Youssef 61'; Challouf 71'	Report

Stade El Menzah, Tunis
Referee: Thierry Nkurunziza (Burundi)

CS Sfaxien won 4–1 on aggregate and advanced to the second round.

2 March 2014
16:30 UTC±0

Horoya (Guinea)	1–0	(Morocco) Raja Casablanca
Keïta 27'	Report

Stade du 28 Septembre, Conakry
Referee: Badara Diatta (Senegal)
8 March 2014
19:00 UTC±0

Raja Casablanca (Morocco)	1–0	(Guinea) Horoya
Iajour 87'	Report
Penalties
	4–5

Stade Mohamed V, Casablanca
Referee: Adam Cordier (Chad)

1–1 on aggregate. Horoya won the penalty shoot-out and advanced to the second round.

1 March 2014
15:30 UTC+2

Flambeau de l’Est (Burundi)	1–0	(Cameroon) Coton Sport
Shabani 4'	Report

Prince Louis Rwagasore Stadium, Bujumbura
Referee: Hudu Munyemana (Rwanda)
9 March 2014
15:00 UTC+1

Coton Sport (Cameroon)	5–0	(Burundi) Flambeau de l’Est
Yossanguim 21'; Daouda 28'; Souleymanou 72'; Kako 77', 90'	Report

Roumdé Adjia Stadium, Garoua
Referee: Jean-Jacques Ndala Ngambo (Congo DR)

Coton Sport won 5–1 on aggregate and advanced to the second round.

2 March 2014
17:45 UTC+1

ES Sétif (Algeria)	5–0	(Burkina Faso) ASFA Yennenga
Belameiri 18'; Benhadouche 37', 42'; Nadji 69'; Djahnit 90+4'	Report

Stade 8 Mai 1945, Sétif
Referee: Slim Jedidi (Tunisia)
8 March 2014
16:00 UTC±0

ASFA Yennenga (Burkina Faso)	0–0	(Algeria) ES Sétif
	Report

Stade du 4-Août, Ouagadougou
Referee: Sékou Ahmed Touré (Guinea)

ES Sétif won 5–0 on aggregate and advanced to the second round.

1 March 2014
17:00 UTC±0

Stade Malien (Mali)	0–0	(Sudan) Al-Hilal
	Report

Stade Modibo Kéïta, Bamako
Referee: Kokou Fagla (Togo)
9 March 2014
20:00 UTC+3

Al-Hilal (Sudan)	2–0	(Mali) Stade Malien
Careca 8'; Bisha 69'	Report

Khartoum Stadium, Khartoum
Referee: Néant Alioum (Cameroon)

Al-Hilal won 2–0 on aggregate and advanced to the second round.

2 March 2014
15:30 UTC+1

AC Léopards (Republic of the Congo)	4–1	(Angola) Primeiro de Agosto
Kalema 3', 54' (pen.); Gandzé 30', 64'		Ary Papel 35'

Stade Denis Sassou Nguesso, Dolisie
Referee: Ali Adelaïd (Comoros)
8 March 2014
17:00 UTC+1

Primeiro de Agosto (Angola)	2–0	(Republic of the Congo) AC Léopards
Afonso 3'; Amaro 48' (pen.)

Estádio 11 de Novembro, Luanda
Referee: Ganesh Chutooree (Mauritius)

AC Léopards won 4–3 on aggregate and advanced to the second round.

1 March 2014
19:00 UTC+2

Kaizer Chiefs (South Africa)	4–0	(Mozambique) Liga Muçulmana
Musona 14'; Tshabalala 24'; Rusike 80'; Mathoho 88'	Report

Moses Mabhida Stadium, Durban
Referee: Nelson Fred (Seychelles)
8 March 2014
18:00 UTC+2

Liga Muçulmana (Mozambique)	0–3	(South Africa) Kaizer Chiefs
	Report	Musona 17', 25', 33' (pen.)

Estádio do Zimpeto, Maputo
Referee: Wellington Kaoma (Zambia)

Kaizer Chiefs won 7–0 on aggregate and advanced to the second round.

1 March 2014
15:00 UTC+2

Dynamos (Zimbabwe)	0–0	(Democratic Republic of the Congo) AS Vita Club
	Report

National Sports Stadium, Harare
Referee: Hamada Nampiandraza (Madagascar)
9 March 2014
15:30 UTC+1

AS Vita Club (Democratic Republic of the Congo)	1–0	(Zimbabwe) Dynamos
Etekiama 38' (pen.)	Report

Stade Tata Raphaël, Kinshasa
Referee: Anthony Ramsy Raphael (Malawi)

AS Vita Club won 1–0 on aggregate and advanced to the second round.

1 March 2014
18:45 UTC+2

Zamalek (Egypt)	1–0	(Angola) Kabuscorp
Fathalla 55'

Cairo International Stadium, Cairo
Referee: Mutaz Khairalla (Sudan)
7 March 2014
15:30 UTC+1

Kabuscorp (Angola)	0–0	(Egypt) Zamalek

Estádio 11 de Novembro, Luanda
Referee: Noumandiez Doué (Ivory Coast)

Zamalek won 1–0 on aggregate and advanced to the second round.

1 March 2014
15:00 UTC+2

Nkana (Zambia)	2–2	(Uganda) Kampala City Council
Kampamba 37'; Musonda 51'	Report	Odur 25'; Majwega 80' (pen.)

Arthur Davies Stadium, Kitwe
Referee: Djamal Aden (Djibouti)
8 March 2014
16:00 UTC+3

Kampala City Council (Uganda)	1–2	(Zambia) Nkana
Majwega 49'	Report	C. Bwalya 31'; Munthali 59'

National Stadium, Kampala
Referee: Rainhold Shikongo (Namibia)

Nkana won 4–3 on aggregate and advanced to the second round.

== Second round ==
The second round included the 16 winners of the first round.

The winners of each tie advanced to the group stage, while the losers entered the Confederation Cup play-off round.

Team 1	Agg.	Team 2	1st leg	2nd leg
Al-Ahly Benghazi (Libya)	4–2	(Egypt) Al-Ahly	1–0	3–2
AS Real Bamako (Mali)	1–4	(Tunisia) Espérance de Tunis	1–1	0–3
Séwé Sport (Ivory Coast)	2–2 (a)	(Democratic Republic of the Congo) TP Mazembe	2–1	0–1
Horoya (Guinea)	0–3	(Tunisia) CS Sfaxien	0–1	0–2
ES Sétif (Algeria)	2–0	(Cameroon) Coton Sport	1–0	1–0
AC Léopards (Republic of the Congo)	1–1 (a)	(Sudan) Al-Hilal	1–1	0–0
AS Vita Club (Democratic Republic of the Congo)	3–2	(South Africa) Kaizer Chiefs	3–0	0–2
Nkana (Zambia)	0–5	(Egypt) Zamalek	0–0	0–5

21 March 2014
14:00 UTC+1

Al-Ahly Benghazi (Libya)	1–0	(Egypt) Al-Ahly
Sadomba 67'	Report

Stade Chedli Zouiten, Tunis (Tunisia)
Referee: Bouchaïb El Ahrach (Morocco)
29 March 2014
19:00 UTC+2

Al-Ahly (Egypt)	2–3	(Libya) Al-Ahly Benghazi
Nagieb 40'; Gamal 75'	Report	Fetori 42' (pen.); Farag 52'; Al Mehdi 58'

30 June Stadium, Cairo
Referee: Daniel Bennett (South Africa)

Note: The first leg was played outside of Libya due to security concerns.
Al-Ahly Benghazi won 4–2 on aggregate and advanced to the group stage. Al-Ahly entered the Confederation Cup play-off round.

22 March 2014
16:30 UTC±0

AS Real Bamako (Mali)	1–1	(Tunisia) Espérance de Tunis
Doumbia 78'	Report	Jouini 27'

Stade Modibo Kéïta, Bamako
Referee: Joshua Bondo (Botswana)
30 March 2014
16:00 UTC+1

Espérance de Tunis (Tunisia)	3–0	(Mali) AS Real Bamako
Jouini 33'; Msakni 53'; Afful 84'	Report

Stade Olympique de Radès, Tunis
Referee: Tessema Bamlak (Ethiopia)

Espérance de Tunis won 4–1 on aggregate and advanced to the group stage. AS Real Bamako entered the Confederation Cup play-off round.

23 March 2014
16:00 UTC±0

Séwé Sport (Ivory Coast)	2–1	(Democratic Republic of the Congo) TP Mazembe
Assalé 36'; Kouamé 85' (pen.)	Report	Samatta 89'

Stade Robert Champroux, Abidjan
Referee: Mohamed Farouk Mahmoud (Egypt)
29 March 2014
15:30 UTC+2

TP Mazembe (Democratic Republic of the Congo)	1–0	(Ivory Coast) Séwé Sport
Samatta 66'	Report

Stade TP Mazembe, Lubumbashi
Referee: Hudu Munyemana (Rwanda)

2–2 on aggregate. TP Mazembe won on the away goals rule and advanced to the group stage. Séwé Sport entered the Confederation Cup play-off round.

23 March 2014
16:30 UTC±0

Horoya (Guinea)	0–1	(Tunisia) CS Sfaxien
	Report	Ben Youssef 60'

Stade du 28 Septembre, Conakry
Referee: Antonio Muachihuissa Caxala (Angola)
29 March 2014
18:00 UTC+1

CS Sfaxien (Tunisia)	2–0	(Guinea) Horoya
Ben Youssef 11'; Moncer 26'	Report

Stade Taïeb Mhiri, Sfax
Referee: Mahamadou Keita (Mali)

CS Sfaxien won 3–0 on aggregate and advanced to the group stage. Horoya entered the Confederation Cup play-off round.

23 March 2014
19:15 UTC+1

ES Sétif (Algeria)	1–0	(Cameroon) Coton Sport
Belameiri 45+2'	Report

Stade 8 Mai 1945, Sétif
Referee: Hagi Wiish (Somalia)
30 March 2014
15:00 UTC+1

Coton Sport (Cameroon)	0–1	(Algeria) ES Sétif
	Report	Belameiri 11'

Roumdé Adjia Stadium, Garoua
Referee: Rajindraparsad Seechurn (Mauritius)

ES Sétif won 2–0 on aggregate and advanced to the group stage. Coton Sport entered the Confederation Cup play-off round.

23 March 2014
15:30 UTC+1

AC Léopards (Republic of the Congo)	1–1	(Sudan) Al-Hilal
Ndey 44'	Report	Careca 22'

Stade Denis Sassou Nguesso, Dolisie
Referee: Maguette N'Diaye (Senegal)
30 March 2014
20:00 UTC+3

Al-Hilal (Sudan)	0–0	(Republic of the Congo) AC Léopards
	Report

Khartoum Stadium, Khartoum
Referee: Joseph Lamptey (Ghana)

1–1 on aggregate. Al-Hilal won on the away goals rule and advanced to the group stage. AC Léopards entered the Confederation Cup play-off round.

23 March 2014
15:30 UTC+1

AS Vita Club (Democratic Republic of the Congo)	3–0	(South Africa) Kaizer Chiefs
Mubele 10', 35', 47'	Report

Stade Tata Raphaël, Kinshasa
Referee: Bienvenu Sinko (Ivory Coast)
29 March 2014
19:00 UTC+2

Kaizer Chiefs (South Africa)	2–0	(Democratic Republic of the Congo) AS Vita Club
Musona 9'; Gould 90+2'	Report

FNB Stadium, Johannesburg
Referee: Rainhold Shikongo (Namibia)

AS Vita Club won 3–2 on aggregate and advanced to the group stage. Kaizer Chiefs entered the Confederation Cup play-off round.

22 March 2014
15:00 UTC+2

Nkana (Zambia)	0–0	(Egypt) Zamalek
	Report

Nkana Stadium, Kitwe
Referee: Davies Omweno (Kenya)
30 March 2014
18:45 UTC+2

Zamalek (Egypt)	5–0	(Zambia) Nkana
Tawfik 20'; Zakaria 35'; Gaber 47'; Emam 60'; Gaafar 70'	Report

30 June Stadium, Cairo
Referee: Néant Alioum (Cameroon)

Zamalek won 5–0 on aggregate and advanced to the group stage. Nkana entered the Confederation Cup play-off round.
