= 2014 CAF Champions League final =

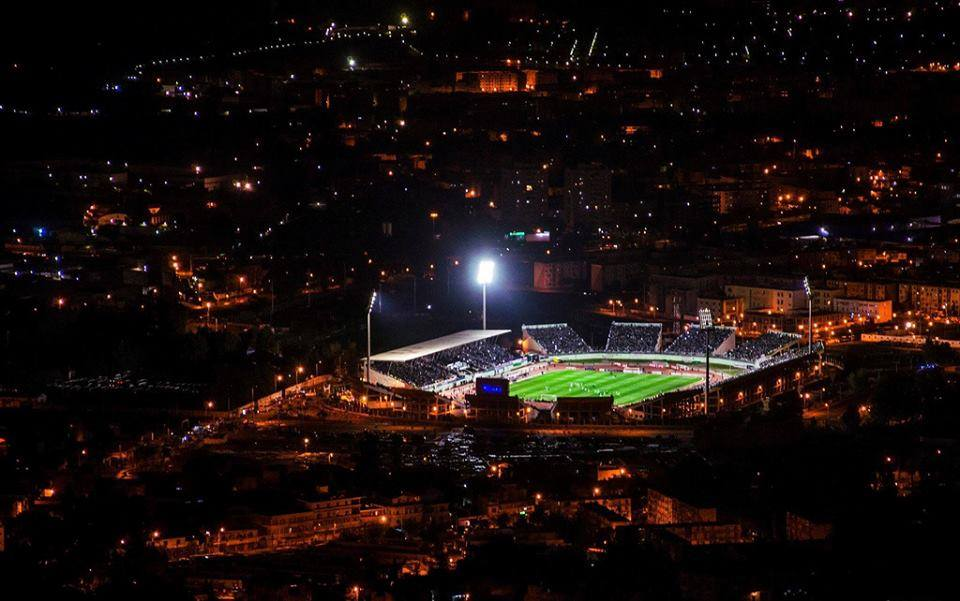
- Mustapha Tchaker Stadium hosted the podium where ES Sétif lifted the trophy
- Event: 2014 CAF Champions League
AS Vita Club	ES Sétif
(Democratic Republic of the Congo)	(Algeria)
3	3
- on aggregate ES Sétif won on away goals.

First leg
AS Vita Club	ES Sétif
2	2
- Date: 26 October 2014
- Venue: Stade Tata Raphaël, Kinshasa
- Referee: Janny Sikazwe (Zambia)
- Attendance: 40,000

Second leg
ES Sétif	AS Vita Club
1	1
- Date: 1 November 2014
- Venue: Stade Mustapha Tchaker, Blida
- Referee: Bakary Gassama (Gambia)
- Attendance: 35,000

The 2014 CAF Champions League final was the final of the 2014 CAF Champions League, the 50th edition of Africa's premier club football tournament organized by the Confederation of African Football (CAF), and the 18th edition under the current CAF Champions League format.

The final was contested in two-legged home-and-away format between AS Vita Club of Democratic Republic of the Congo and ES Sétif of Algeria. The first leg was hosted by AS Vita Club at the Stade Tata Raphaël in Kinshasa on 26 October 2014, while the second leg was hosted by ES Sétif at the Stade Mustapha Tchaker in Blida on 1 November 2014. The winner earned the right to represent the CAF at the 2014 FIFA Club World Cup, entering at the quarterfinal stage, as well as play in the 2015 CAF Super Cup against the winner of the 2014 CAF Confederation Cup.

Both matches ended in draws, 2–2 in the first leg, and 1–1 in the second leg, giving ES Sétif the title on the away goals rule (3–3 on aggregate).

== Qualified teams ==
In the following table, finals until 1996 were in the African Cup of Champions Club era, since 1997 were in the CAF Champions League era.

Team	Region	Previous finals appearances (bold indicates winners)
(Democratic Republic of the Congo) AS Vita Club	UNIFFAC (Central Africa)	**1973**, 1981
(Algeria) ES Sétif	UNAF (North Africa)	**1988**

== Background ==
AS Vita Club had reached the final of the African Cup of Champions Clubs (predecessor of the CAF Champions League) twice, winning in 1973 and losing in 1981.

ES Sétif had reached the final of the African Cup of Champions Clubs once, winning in 1988. They were the first Algerian side to reach the final of Africa's premier club championship since 1990.

== Venues ==
=== Stade Tata Raphaël ===
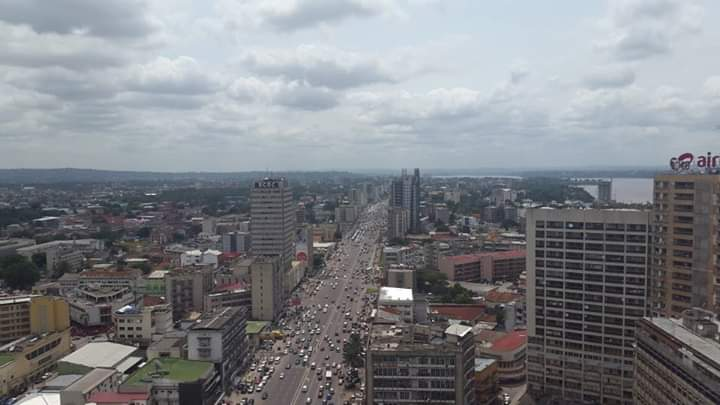
Kinshasa, DR Congo hosted the first leg.

Stade Tata Raphaël (Father Raphael Stadium) is a multi-purpose stadium in Kinshasa, Democratic Republic of the Congo. Originally known as Stade Roi Baudouin (King Baudouin Stadium) when it was inaugurated in 1952 and Stade du 20 Mai (20 May Stadium) in 1967, it was used mostly for football matches. The stadium has a maximum capacity of 50,000 people.

The stadium's most famous event was The Rumble in the Jungle boxing match between Muhammad Ali and George Foreman for the Undisputed WBC/WBA Heavyweight Championship that took place on October 30, 1974. 60,000 people attended the boxing match. In what was ranked as a great upset, Ali knocked out the previously undefeated Foreman in eight rounds. The associated music festival, Zaire 74, that took place at the stadium six weeks prior to the boxing match, included such stars as James Brown and B.B. King.

Following the downfall of President Mobutu Sese Seko's regime in 1997, the stadium was renamed Stade Tata Raphaël after Raphaël de la Kethulle de Ryhove, initiator of the stadium in 1952.

=== Mustapha Tchaker Stadium ===
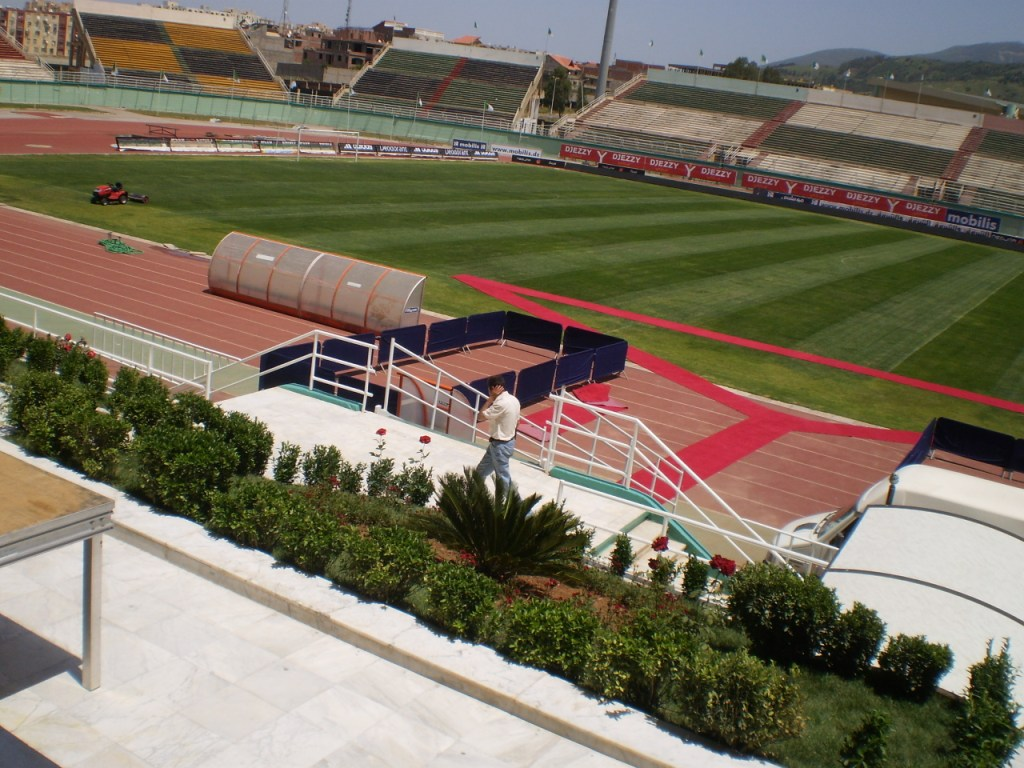
Mustapha Tchaker Stadium in Blida, Algeria hosted the second leg.

Mustapha Tchaker Stadium is a multi-purpose stadium in Blida, Algeria. It is currently used mostly for football matches. The stadium has a capacity of 37,000 people. The stadium is the home of the Algeria national football team.

The stadium was inaugurated on 26 February 2001.

The first local match of the USM Blida at Mustapha Tchaker Stadium took place on 30 August 2001. This is, then, a first match of Algerian championship (D1) against USM Alger (0-0).

It became the main stadium of the Algerian football team from 2008. However, the first international match to be held there was on 20 August 2002. It is, then, a friendly match against the DR Congo national football team (1-1).

It is regarded as good luck by the Algerian fans and as a "impregnable fortress" by the specialists. Indeed, the Algerian team has never lost in this stadium.

The ES Sétif administration confirmed that the selection of the Blida stadium is because it has all the necessary conditions to organize a final match.

== Road to final ==
Note: In all results below, the score of the finalist is given first (H: home; A: away).

(Democratic Republic of the Congo) AS Vita Club				Round	(Algeria) ES Sétif			
Opponent	Agg.	1st leg	2nd leg	Qualifying rounds	Opponent	Agg.	1st leg	2nd leg
(Nigeria) Kano Pillars	4–3	3–1 (H)	1–2 (A)	Preliminary round	(The Gambia) Steve Biko	w/o	— (H)	— (A)
(Zimbabwe) Dynamos	1–0	0–0 (A)	1–0 (H)	First round	(Burkina Faso) ASFA Yennenga	5–0	5–0 (H)	0–0 (A)
(South Africa) Kaizer Chiefs	3–2	3–0 (H)	0–2 (A)	Second round	(Cameroon) Coton Sport	2–0	1–0 (H)	1–0 (A)
Opponent	Result			Group stage	Opponent	Result		
(Egypt) Zamalek	2–1 (H)			Matchday 1	(Tunisia) Espérance de Tunis	2–1 (A)		
(Democratic Republic of the Congo) TP Mazembe	0–1 (A)			Matchday 2	(Tunisia) CS Sfaxien	1–1 (H)		
(Sudan) Al-Hilal	1–1 (A)			Matchday 3	(Libya) Al-Ahly Benghazi	1–1 (H)		
(Sudan) Al-Hilal	2–1 (H)			Matchday 4	(Libya) Al-Ahly Benghazi	2–0 (A)		
(Egypt) Zamalek	1–0 (A)			Matchday 5	(Tunisia) Espérance de Tunis	2–2 (H)		
(Democratic Republic of the Congo) TP Mazembe	0–0 (H)			Matchday 6	(Tunisia) CS Sfaxien	1–1 (A)		
**Group A runner-up**: Pos / Team / Pld / Pts; 1 / (Democratic Republic of the Congo) TP Mazembe / 6 / **11**; **2** / (Democratic Republic of the Congo) AS Vita Club / **6** / **11**; 3 / (Sudan) Al-Hilal / 6 / **7**; 4 / (Egypt) Zamalek / 6 / **4**; Source: CAF				Final standings	**Group B runner-up**: Pos / Team / Pld / Pts; 1 / (Tunisia) CS Sfaxien / 6 / **11**; **2** / (Algeria) ES Sétif / **6** / **10**; 3 / (Tunisia) Espérance de Tunis / 6 / **7**; 4 / (Libya) Al-Ahly Benghazi / 6 / **4**; Source: CAF			
Opponent	Agg.	1st leg	2nd leg	Knock-out stage	Opponent	Agg.	1st leg	2nd leg
(Tunisia) CS Sfaxien	4–2	2–1 (H)	2–1 (A)	Semifinals	(Democratic Republic of the Congo) TP Mazembe	4–4 (a)	2–1 (H)	2–3 (A)

== Format ==
The final was played on a home-and-away two-legged basis. If the sides were level on aggregate after the second leg, the away goals rule was applied, and if still level, the tie proceeded directly to a penalty shoot-out (no extra time was played).

== Matches ==
=== First leg ===
The opening goal came in the 17th minute when a corner from the right was turned in past his own goalkeeper by Firmin Ndombe Mubele at the near post to give ES Sétif the lead. AS Vita Club got the equalizer in injury time in the first half from a penalty after handball in the box by Mohamed Lagraâ. Chikito Lema Mabidi took the penalty, shooting right footed to the right of the goalkeeper. ES Sétif regained the lead in the 57th minute when Akram Djahnit finished low to the net from close range after taking the ball around the goalkeeper. Mabidi tied the game at 2–2 in the 77th minute with a long range shot from 30 yards with his right foot.

26 October 2014
15:30 UTC+1

AS Vita Club (Democratic Republic of the Congo)	2–2	(Algeria) ES Sétif
Mabidi 45+3' (pen.), 77'	Report	Mubele 17' (o.g.); Djahnit 57'

Stade Tata Raphaël, Kinshasa
Attendance: 40,000
Referee: Janny Sikazwe (Zambia)

**AS Vita Club**	**ES Sétif**

GK	16	(Cameroon) Nelson Lukong
DF	2	(Democratic Republic of the Congo) Bawaka Mabele
DF	8	(Burkina Faso) Issoufou Dayo
DF	29	(Cameroon) Paolo Mondo Mouegni
DF	3	(Democratic Republic of the Congo) Patou Simbi Ebunga (c)
MF	6	(Democratic Republic of the Congo) Nelson Munganga
MF	5	(Democratic Republic of the Congo) Chikito Lema Mabidi
FW	11	(Democratic Republic of the Congo) Héritier Luvumbu Nzinga
FW	10	(Democratic Republic of the Congo) Guy Lusadisu Basisila	(substituted off) 67'
FW	19	(Democratic Republic of the Congo) Firmin Ndombe Mubele	(substituted off) 65'
FW	4	(Uganda) Yunus Sentamu
Substitutes:
GK	1	(Democratic Republic of the Congo) Landu Makiese
DF	13	(Democratic Republic of the Congo) Joyce Lomalisa
DF	15	(Democratic Republic of the Congo) Patrick Lema Mampuya
DF	17	(Democratic Republic of the Congo) Thierry Kasereka
MF	12	(Democratic Republic of the Congo) Yves Magola Mapanda	(substituted on) 67'
FW	18	(Democratic Republic of the Congo) Mbala Ndombe
FW	23	(Democratic Republic of the Congo) Emmanuel Ngudikama	(substituted on) 65'
Manager:
(Democratic Republic of the Congo) Florent Ibengé

GK	1	(Algeria) Sofiane Khedairia
DF	6	(Algeria) Amine Megateli
DF	20	(Algeria) Farid Mellouli (c)
DF	26	(Algeria) Mohamed Lagraâ
DF	15	(Algeria) Abdelghani Demmou
MF	17	(Gabon) Benjamin Zé Ondo
MF	29	(Algeria) Toufik Zerara
FW	13	(Algeria) Sid Ali Lamri	(yellow card) 83'
FW	30	(Algeria) Akram Djahnit		(substituted off) 86'
FW	3	(Algeria) Sofiane Younès		(substituted off) 90+3'
FW	19	(Algeria) Abdelmalek Ziaya		(substituted off) 78'
Substitutes:
GK	24	(Algeria) Abderaouf Belhani
DF	4	(Algeria) Said Arroussi
DF	18	(Algeria) Lyes Boukria
MF	8	(Algeria) Mohamed Billel Raït		(substituted on) 86'
FW	9	(Algeria) Mohamed Benyettou		(substituted on) 78'
FW	12	(Algeria) Abdelhakim Amokrane
FW	25	(Algeria) El Hedi Belameiri		(substituted on) 90+3'
Manager:
(Algeria) Kheïreddine Madoui

Assistant referees:
Jerson dos Santos (Angola)
Bruno Tembo (Zambia)
Fourth official:
Wellington Kaoma (Zambia)

=== Second leg ===
Sofiane Younès scored the opening goal for ES Sétif in the second leg after 49 minutes when he turned the ball into the net from a yard out at the back post after a cross from the right. Chikito Lema Mabidi equalized for AS Vita Club in the 53rd minute with a powerful right footed shot from outside the penalty area after a pass from the right. The draw meant that ES Sétif won the final on the away goals rule.

1 November 2014
19:15 UTC+1

ES Sétif (Algeria)	1–1	(Democratic Republic of the Congo) AS Vita Club
Younès 50'	Report	Mabidi 54'

Stade Mustapha Tchaker, Blida
Attendance: 35,000
Referee: Bakary Gassama (Gambia)

**ES Sétif**	**AS Vita Club**

GK	1	(Algeria) Sofiane Khedairia
DF	6	(Algeria) Amine Megateli
DF	20	(Algeria) Farid Mellouli (c)
DF	26	(Algeria) Mohamed Lagraâ
DF	15	(Algeria) Abdelghani Demmou
MF	17	(Gabon) Benjamin Zé Ondo	(yellow card) 63'
MF	29	(Algeria) Toufik Zerara
FW	25	(Algeria) El Hedi Belameiri
FW	30	(Algeria) Akram Djahnit		(substituted off) 84'
FW	3	(Algeria) Sofiane Younès		(substituted off) 80'
FW	19	(Algeria) Abdelmalek Ziaya		(substituted off) 67'
Substitutes:
GK	24	(Algeria) Abderaouf Belhani
DF	4	(Algeria) Said Arroussi
DF	18	(Algeria) Lyes Boukria
MF	8	(Algeria) Mohamed Billel Raït		(substituted on) 84'
FW	9	(Algeria) Mohamed Benyettou		(substituted on) 67'
FW	12	(Algeria) Abdelhakim Amokrane
FW	13	(Algeria) Sid Ali Lamri		(substituted on) 80'
Manager:
(Algeria) Kheïreddine Madoui

GK	16	(Cameroon) Nelson Lukong
DF	2	(Democratic Republic of the Congo) Bawaka Mabele
DF	8	(Burkina Faso) Issoufou Dayo	(yellow card) 52'
DF	29	(Cameroon) Paolo Mondo Mouegni
DF	3	(Democratic Republic of the Congo) Patou Simbi Ebunga (c)
MF	6	(Democratic Republic of the Congo) Nelson Munganga
MF	5	(Democratic Republic of the Congo) Chikito Lema Mabidi	(yellow card) 54'
FW	11	(Democratic Republic of the Congo) Héritier Luvumbu Nzinga
FW	10	(Democratic Republic of the Congo) Guy Lusadisu Basisila		(substituted off) 74'
FW	19	(Democratic Republic of the Congo) Firmin Ndombe Mubele	(yellow card) 49'	(substituted off) 81'
FW	4	(Uganda) Yunus Sentamu		(substituted off) 90+2'
Substitutes:
GK	30	(Democratic Republic of the Congo) Lomboto Nguemba
DF	13	(Democratic Republic of the Congo) Joyce Lomalisa
DF	15	(Democratic Republic of the Congo) Patrick Lema Mampuya
DF	17	(Democratic Republic of the Congo) Thierry Kasereka		(substituted on) 90+2'
MF	12	(Democratic Republic of the Congo) Yves Magola Mapanda
FW	23	(Democratic Republic of the Congo) Emmanuel Ngudikama		(substituted on) 81'
FW	25	(Democratic Republic of the Congo) Déo Kanda		(substituted on) 74'
Manager:
(Democratic Republic of the Congo) Florent Ibengé

Assistant referees:
Evarist Menkouande (Cameroon)
Dickory Jawo (Gambia)
Fourth official:
Maudo Jallow (Gambia)
