= 2014 CAF Champions League knockout stage =

The knock-out stage of the 2014 CAF Champions League was played from 20 September to 1 November 2014. A total of four teams competed in the knock-out stage.

== Qualified teams ==
The winners and runners-up of each of the two groups in the group stage qualified for the knock-out stage.

Group	Winners	Runners-up
A	(Democratic Republic of the Congo) TP Mazembe	(Democratic Republic of the Congo) AS Vita Club
B	(Tunisia) CS Sfaxien	(Algeria) ES Sétif

== Format ==
Knock-out ties were played on a home-and-away two-legged basis. If the sides were level on aggregate after the second leg, the away goals rule was applied, and if still level, the tie proceeded directly to a penalty shoot-out (no extra time was played).

== Schedule ==
The schedule of each round was as follows.

Round	First leg	Second leg
Semi-finals	19–21 September 2014	26–28 September 2014
Final	24–26 October 2014	31 October–2 November 2014

== Semi-finals ==
In the semi-finals, the group A winners played the group B runners-up, and the group B winners played the group A runners-up, with the group winners hosting the second leg.

Team 1	Agg.	Team 2	1st leg	2nd leg
ES Sétif (Algeria)	4–4 (a)	(Democratic Republic of the Congo) TP Mazembe	2–1	2–3
AS Vita Club (Democratic Republic of the Congo)	4–2	(Tunisia) CS Sfaxien	2–1	2–1

20 September 2014
20:00 UTC+1

ES Sétif (Algeria)	2–1	(Democratic Republic of the Congo) TP Mazembe
Younès 55'; Ziaya 89'	Report	Arroussi 52' (o.g.)

Stade 8 Mai 1945, Sétif
Attendance: 0 (close doors)
Referee: Néant Alioum (Cameroon)
28 September 2014
15:00 UTC+2

TP Mazembe (Democratic Republic of the Congo)	3–2	(Algeria) ES Sétif
Adjei 21'; Coulibaly 38'; Bolingi 53'	Report	Ziaya 9'; Younès 75'

Stade TP Mazembe, Lubumbashi
Referee: Gehad Grisha (Egypt)

4–4 on aggregate. ES Sétif won on the away goals rule and advanced to the final.

21 September 2014
15:30 UTC+1

AS Vita Club (Democratic Republic of the Congo)	2–1	(Tunisia) CS Sfaxien
Mubele 37'; Nzinga 54'	Report	Maâloul 69'

Stade Tata Raphaël, Kinshasa
Referee: Bouchaïb El Ahrach (Morocco)
27 September 2014
18:00 UTC+1

CS Sfaxien (Tunisia)	1–2	(Democratic Republic of the Congo) AS Vita Club
Derbali 26'	Report	Dayo 45+1'; Sentamu 55'

Stade Taïeb Mhiri, Sfax
Referee: Noumandiez Doué (Ivory Coast)

AS Vita Club won 4–2 on aggregate and advanced to the final.

== Final ==
In the final, the order of legs was decided by a draw, held after the group stage draw (29 April 2014, 11:00 UTC+2, at the CAF Headquarters in Cairo, Egypt).

Team 1	Agg.	Team 2	1st leg	2nd leg
AS Vita Club (Democratic Republic of the Congo)	3–3 (a)	(Algeria) ES Sétif	2–2	1–1

26 October 2014
15:30 UTC+1

AS Vita Club (Democratic Republic of the Congo)	2–2	(Algeria) ES Sétif
Mabidi 45+3' (pen.), 77'	Report	Mubele 17' (o.g.); Djahnit 57'

Stade Tata Raphaël, Kinshasa
Referee: Janny Sikazwe (Zambia)
1 November 2014
19:15 UTC+1

ES Sétif (Algeria)	1–1	(Democratic Republic of the Congo) AS Vita Club
Younès 50'	Report	Mabidi 54'

Stade Mustapha Tchaker, Blida
Referee: Bakary Gassama (Gambia)

3–3 on aggregate. ES Sétif won on the away goals rule.
