= 2014 CAF Champions League group stage =

- Dates: 16 May – 24 August 2014

Tournament statistics
- Matches played: 24
- Goals scored: 52 (2.17 per match)

The group stage of the 2014 CAF Champions League was played from 16 May to 24 August 2014. A total of eight teams competed in the group stage.

== Draw ==
The draw for the group stage was held on 29 April 2014, 11:00 UTC+2, at the CAF Headquarters in Cairo, Egypt. The eight winners of the second round were drawn into two groups of four. Each group contained one team from each of the four seeding pots. The seeding of each team was determined by their ranking points calculated based on performances in continental club championships for the period 2009–2013.

The following eight teams were entered into the draw:

Pot 1	Pot 2	Pot 3	Pot 4
(Tunisia) Espérance de Tunis (54 pts); (Democratic Republic of the Congo) TP Mazembe (42 pts)	(Tunisia) CS Sfaxien (26 pts); (Sudan) Al-Hilal (24 pts)	(Egypt) Zamalek (14 pts); (Algeria) ES Sétif (12 pts)	(Democratic Republic of the Congo) AS Vita Club (1 pt); (Libya) Al-Ahly Benghazi (0 pts)

== Format ==
In the group stage, each group was played on a home-and-away round-robin basis. The winners and runners-up of each group advanced to the semi-finals.

=== Tiebreakers ===
The teams are ranked according to points (3 points for a win, 1 point for a draw, 0 points for a loss). If tied on points, tiebreakers are applied in the following order:

1. Number of points obtained in games between the teams concerned
2. Goal difference in games between the teams concerned
3. Away goals scored in games between the teams concerned
4. Goal difference in all games
5. Goals scored in all games.

== Groups ==
The matchdays were 16–18 May, 23–25 May, 6–8 June, 25–27 July, 8–10 August, and 22–24 August 2014.

=== Group A ===
Pos	Team	Pld	W	D	L	GF	GA	GD	Pts	Qualification
1	(Democratic Republic of the Congo) TP Mazembe	6	3	2	1	5	2	+3	11 (Note: Tiebreakers: TP Mazembe and AS Vita Club are ranked on head-to-head record.)	Advance to knockout stage
2	(Democratic Republic of the Congo) AS Vita Club	6	3	2	1	6	4	+2	11	Advance to knockout stage
3	(Sudan) Al-Hilal	6	2	1	3	7	9	−2	7	
4	(Egypt) Zamalek	6	1	1	4	4	7	−3	4	

Source: CAF
Rules for classification: Group stage tiebreakers
Notes:
16 May 2014
20:30 UTC+3

Al-Hilal (Sudan)	1–0	(Democratic Republic of the Congo) TP Mazembe
Ibrahim 51'	Report

Khartoum Stadium, Khartoum
Referee: Janny Sikazwe (Zambia)
18 May 2014
15:30 UTC+1

AS Vita Club (Democratic Republic of the Congo)	2–1	(Egypt) Zamalek
Mubele 18'; Ngudikana 80'	Report	Zakaria 76'

Stade Tata Raphaël, Kinshasa
Attendance: 5,000
Referee: Bakary Gassama (Gambia)

24 May 2014
19:00 UTC+3

Zamalek (Egypt)	2–1	(Sudan) Al-Hilal
Dominique 6'; Abdel-Shafy 81'	Report	Careca 25'

30 June Stadium, Cairo
Referee: Rajindraparsad Seechurn (Mauritius)
25 May 2014
15:00 UTC+2

TP Mazembe (Democratic Republic of the Congo)	1–0	(Democratic Republic of the Congo) AS Vita Club
Samatta 62'	Report

Stade TP Mazembe, Lubumbashi
Referee: Néant Alioum (Cameroon)

6 June 2014
20:00 UTC+3

Al-Hilal (Sudan)	1–1	(Democratic Republic of the Congo) AS Vita Club
Sérgio Júnior 19'	Report	Etekiama 88' (pen.)

Khartoum Stadium, Khartoum
Referee: Eric Otogo-Castane (Gabon)
8 June 2014
15:00 UTC+2

TP Mazembe (Democratic Republic of the Congo)	1–0	(Egypt) Zamalek
Kalaba 13'	Report

Stade TP Mazembe, Lubumbashi
Referee: Joseph Lamptey (Ghana)

27 July 2014
16:00 UTC+1

AS Vita Club (Democratic Republic of the Congo)	2–1	(Sudan) Al-Hilal
Basisila 81'; Etekiama 90+7' (pen.)	Report	Bisha 18'

Stade Tata Raphaël, Kinshasa
Referee: Davies Omweno (Kenya)
27 July 2014
21:30 UTC+2

Zamalek (Egypt)	0–0	(Democratic Republic of the Congo) TP Mazembe
	Report

Alexandria Stadium, Alexandria
Referee: Djamel Haimoudi (Algeria)

10 August 2014
15:00 UTC+2

TP Mazembe (Democratic Republic of the Congo)	3–1	(Sudan) Al-Hilal
Kalaba 27'; Asante 60'; Traoré 76'	Report	Careca 90+3'

Stade TP Mazembe, Lubumbashi
Referee: Bouchaïb El Ahrach (Morocco)
10 August 2014
20:30 UTC+3

Zamalek (Egypt)	0–1	(Democratic Republic of the Congo) AS Vita Club
	Report	Sentamu 55'

Alexandria Stadium, Alexandria
Referee: Badara Diatta (Senegal)

22 August 2014
20:00 UTC+3

Al-Hilal (Sudan)	2–1	(Egypt) Zamalek
Bisha 35'; Almadina 84'	Report	Fathi 61'

Khartoum Stadium, Khartoum
Referee: Hamada Nampiandraza (Madagascar)
24 August 2014
15:30 UTC+1

AS Vita Club (Democratic Republic of the Congo)	0–0	(Democratic Republic of the Congo) TP Mazembe
	Report

Stade Tata Raphaël, Kinshasa
Referee: Rajindraparsad Seechurn (Mauritius)

=== Group B ===
Pos	Team	Pld	W	D	L	GF	GA	GD	Pts	
1	(Tunisia) CS Sfaxien	6	3	2	1	8	5	+3	11	Advance to knockout stage
2	(Algeria) ES Sétif	6	2	4	0	9	6	+3	10	Advance to knockout stage
3	(Tunisia) Espérance de Tunis	6	2	1	3	8	9	−1	7	
4	(Libya) Al-Ahly Benghazi	6	1	1	4	5	10	−5	4	

Source: CAF
Rules for classification: Group stage tiebreakers

Note: All home matches of Al-Ahly Benghazi were played outside of Libya due to security concerns.

17 May 2014
20:00 UTC+1

Espérance de Tunis (Tunisia)	1–2	(Algeria) ES Sétif
Mhirsi 54'	Report	Nadji 24'; Belameiri 48'

Stade Olympique de Radès, Tunis
Referee: Aboubacar Mario Bangoura (Guinea)
18 May 2014
18:00 UTC+1

CS Sfaxien (Tunisia)	3–1	(Libya) Al-Ahly Benghazi
Khenissi 15'; Ben Salah 34'; Challouf 86'	Report	Boulaabi 27' (o.g.)

Stade Taïeb Mhiri, Sfax
Referee: Bernard Camille (Seychelles)

24 May 2014
19:00 UTC+1

Al-Ahly Benghazi (Libya)	3–2	(Tunisia) Espérance de Tunis
Sadomba 4'; Farag 12'; Orkuma 44'	Report	Akaïchi 20'; Darragi 78'

Stade Taïeb Mhiri, Sfax (Tunisia)
Referee: Koman Coulibaly (Mali)
25 May 2014
20:30 UTC+1

ES Sétif (Algeria)	1–1	(Tunisia) CS Sfaxien
Belameiri 12'	Report	Maâloul 45+1'

Stade 8 Mai 1945, Sétif
Referee: Badara Diatta (Senegal)

7 June 2014
21:00 UTC+1

ES Sétif (Algeria)	1–1	(Libya) Al-Ahly Benghazi
Nadji 44'	Report	Fetori 90+1' (pen.)

Stade 8 Mai 1945, Sétif
Referee: Ali Lemghaifry (Mauritania)
8 June 2014
19:00 UTC+1

Espérance de Tunis (Tunisia)	2–1	(Tunisia) CS Sfaxien
Darragi 65'; Mhirsi 66'	Report	Hannachi 47'

Stade Olympique de Radès, Tunis
Referee: Rajindraparsad Seechurn (Mauritius)

25 July 2014
22:00 UTC+1

Al-Ahly Benghazi (Libya)	0–2	(Algeria) ES Sétif
	Report	Belameiri 18'; Younès 90+3'

Stade Chedli Zouiten, Tunis (Tunisia)
Referee: Bakary Gassama (Gambia)
26 July 2014
22:00 UTC+1

CS Sfaxien (Tunisia)	1–0	(Tunisia) Espérance de Tunis
Moncer 77'	Report

Stade Taïeb Mhiri, Sfax
Referee: Gehad Grisha (Egypt)

8 August 2014
18:00 UTC+1

Al-Ahly Benghazi (Libya)	0–1	(Tunisia) CS Sfaxien
	Report	Sassi 67'

Stade Chedli Zouiten, Tunis (Tunisia)
Referee: Néant Alioum (Cameroon)
9 August 2014
20:30 UTC+1

ES Sétif (Algeria)	2–2	(Tunisia) Espérance de Tunis
Djahnit 29' (pen.), 50'	Report	Akaïchi 7', 72'

Stade 8 Mai 1945, Sétif
Referee: Noumandiez Doué (Ivory Coast)

23 August 2014
18:00 UTC+1

CS Sfaxien (Tunisia)	1–1	(Algeria) ES Sétif
Maâloul 87'	Report	Zé Ondo 64'

Stade Taïeb Mhiri, Sfax
Referee: Eric Otogo-Castane (Gabon)
24 August 2014
19:00 UTC+1

Espérance de Tunis (Tunisia)	1–0	(Libya) Al-Ahly Benghazi
Jerbi 70' (pen.)	Report

Stade Olympique de Radès, Tunis
Referee: Janny Sikazwe (Zambia)
