= 2012–13 Ethiopian Premier League =

67th season of top-tier Ethiopian football

Ethiopian Premier League
- Season: 2012–13
- Champions: Dedebit
- Relegated: Weha Serawoch; Adama Ketema
- Matches: 182
- Goals: 419 (2.3 per match)
- Biggest home win: EEPCO 3 – 0 Adama Kenema
- Biggest away win: Water Works 0 – 4 EEPCO
- Highest scoring: Ethiopia Bunna 2 – 3 Awassa Kenema

The 2012–13 Ethiopian Premier League is the 67th season of the Ethiopian Premier League since its establishment in 1944. A total of 14 teams are contesting the league.

== Clubs ==
- Adama City FC (a.k.a. Adama Kenema)
- Arba Minch City FC (a.k.a. Arba Minch Kenema)
- Awassa City FC (a.k.a. Awassa Kenema)
- Banks SC (a.k.a. Ethiopia Nigd Bank) (Addis Abeba)
- Dedebit (Addis Abeba)
- Defence (a.k.a. Mekelakeya) (Addis Abeba)
- EEPCO (a.k.a. Mebrat Hayl) (Addis Abeba)
- Ethiopian Coffee (a.k.a. Ethiopian Bunna) (Addis Abeba)
- Ethiopian Insurance (Addis Abeba)
- Harrar Beer Botling FC (a.k.a. Harar Bira)
- Muger Cement (a.k.a. Muger Cemento) (Oromiya)
- Saint-George SA (a.k.a. Kedus Giorgis) (Addis Abeba)
- Sidama Coffee (a.k.a. Sidama Bunna) (Awassa)
- Water Works (a.k.a. Weha Serawoch)

== League table ==
Pos	Team	Pld	W	D	L	GF	GA	GD	Pts	Qualification or relegation
1	Dedebit	26	19	4	3	63	26	+37	61	2014 CAF Champions League
2	Kedus Giorgis	26	14	9	3	36	17	+19	51	2014 CAF Confederation Cup
3	Ethiopia Bunna	26	14	8	4	41	23	+18	50	
4	Mekelakeya	26	11	9	6	31	23	+8	42	
5	Awassa Kenema	26	12	5	9	39	33	+6	41	
6	Mebrat Hayl (EEPCO)	26	10	9	7	35	27	+8	39	
7	Arba Minch Ketema	26	7	13	6	29	25	+4	34	
8	Ethiopian Insurance	27	5	16	6	23	25	−2	31	
9	Sidama Bunna	26	5	13	8	24	29	−5	28	
10	Ethiopia Nigd Bank (CBA SA)	26	5	11	10	22	29	−7	26	
11	Harar Bira	26	5	11	10	23	36	−13	26	
12	Muger Cement	26	5	10	11	15	30	−15	25	
13	Weha Serawoch	26	3	6	17	22	55	−33	15	Relegation to Ethiopian Second Division
14	Adama Ketema	26	2	7	17	15	41	−26	13	Relegation to Ethiopian Second Division

Updated to match(es) played on 9 July 2013. Source: Soccerway
Rules for classification: 1) points; 2) goal difference; 3) number of goals scored.
