= Zaire 74: The African Artists =

Zaïre 74: The African Artists

Live album by Various Artists
- Released: 26 May 2017
- Recorded: 22–24 September 1974
- Venue: Stade du 20 Mai
- Length: 115:38
- Label: Wrasse
- Producer: Hugh Masekela, Stewart Levine

Zaïre 74: The African Artists is a live album of selected performances recorded at the Zaire 74 music festival in 1974, which preceded the Rumble in the Jungle boxing match between George Foreman and Muhammed Ali. The album was compiled and produced by Hugh Masekela and Stewart Levine – who had organised the festival – and was released on Wrasse Records on 26 May 2017.

== Background and release ==
Zaire 74 was a three-day music festival held in Kinshasa, Zaire (now the Democratic Republic of the Congo) on 22–24 September 1974. The festival was conceived of, and planned, by South African trumpeter Hugh Masekela and US music producer Stewart Levine, who had been roommates at the Manhattan School of Music. The festival took place in the Stade du 20 Mai, which had a capacity of 70,000. Seventeen artists from Zaire performed, alongside other artists from Africa and the African diaspora including Celia Cruz, Etta James, James Brown, and Bill Withers.

A documentary film about Rumble in the Jungle called When We Were Kings was released in 1996; it also featured footage of James Brown, B.B. King, and other artists performing at Zaire 74. In 2008 a documentary focused on Zaire 74 called Soul Power was released, which included more performances by James Brown, as well as from Celia Cruz and the Fania All Stars, Miriam Makeba, Bill Withers, and others. However, the recordings of the artists from Zaire went largely unheard by even Masekela and Levine until 2015, partly due to disputes over money and control. Levine told NPR that "if we didn't think that these things were relevant and vibrant, then we wouldn't have released it, period...But they're hot!"

The Zaire 74 festival was funded by Zairian dictator Mobutu Sese Seko. Some tracks on the album are literally sung in his praise, including one by Miriam Makeba in Lingala. Levine told Vice that "we were going to make the album longer. But there was too much [Mobutu]...We got tired of hearing him praised. So we cut a few songs, not because they weren’t groovin’ but because we'd had enough of him."

All of the band leaders who feature on the album had died by the time of its release in 2017. Not knowing who owns the rights to the recordings, Levine and Masekela set aside a fund to pay any rights holders that come forward.

== The artists ==
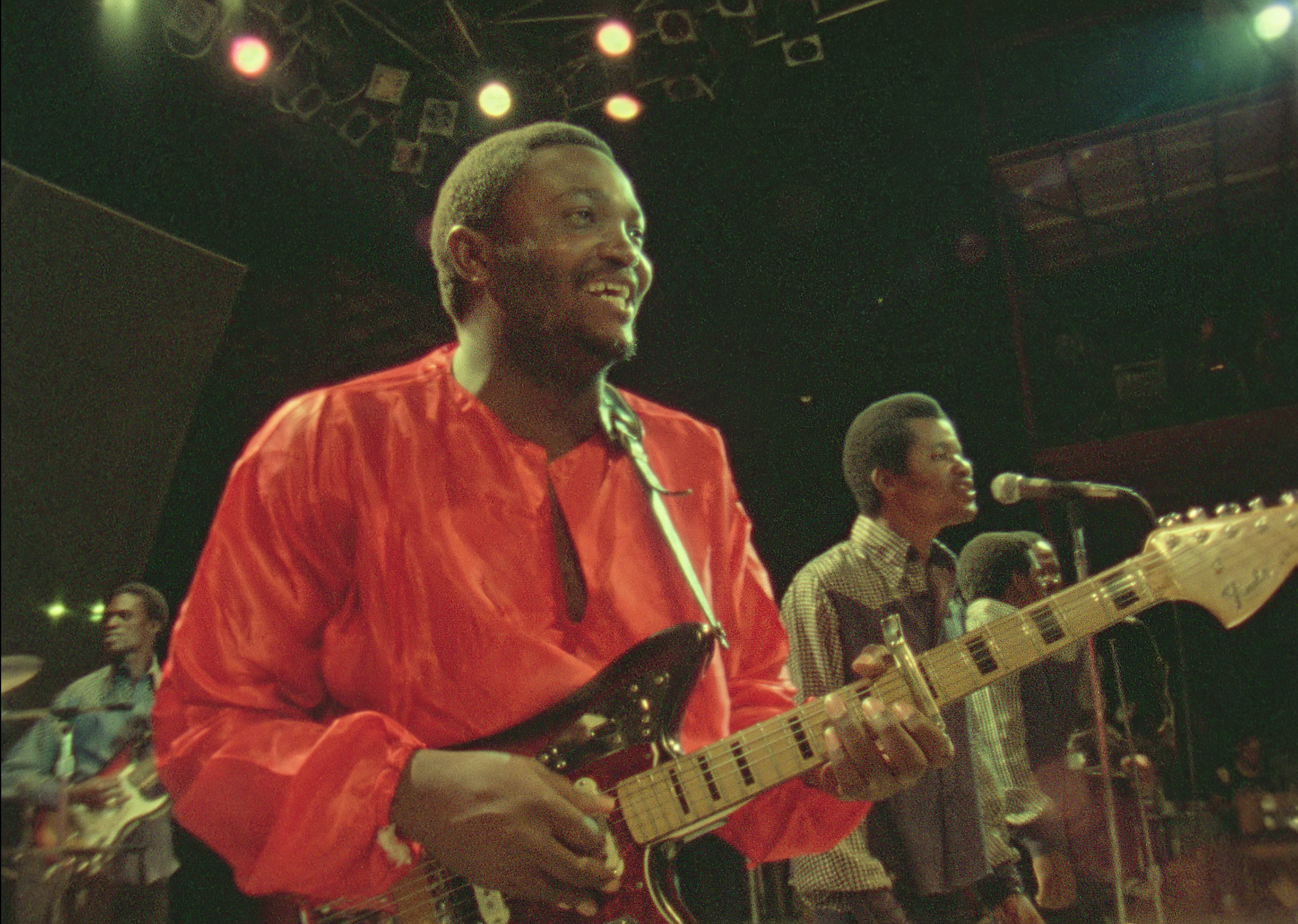
Franco Luambo performing with TPOK Jazz at Zaire 74

Seventeen musical acts from Zaire played at the Zaire 74 festival, and the album collects performances from six of them, plus South African Miriam Makeba.

Tabu Ley Rochereau was a pioneer of Congolese rumba, and his two 1970 shows at the Olympia in Paris brought the genre exposure outside of Africa. At Zaire 74 he was backed by his band Afrisa International. The band featured Augustin "Hennecy" Malao and Karé Kassanda on backing vocals, Mavatiku Visi, Lokassa ya Mbongo, and Bopol Mansiamina on guitar, "Philo" Kola Ntalulu on bass guitar, Alphonse Biolo and Jean Trompette Nzenze on trumpet, and Mekanisi Modero on saxophone.

Abeti Masikini was one of the top female performers in Zaire at the time of the concert, and had also played at the Olympia in 1973. Her brother Abumba Masekini played guitar in what Levine described as a stylistic cross between Jimi Hendrix, Jimmy Page, and Lightnin' Hopkins.

In 1974 Franco Luambo was what Masekela called "the leading musician in the Congo", and he helped Masekela and Levine to liase with Zairian artists when planning the festival. He had played guitar with TPOK Jazz since their formation in 1956, and had been the sole leader of the group since 1970.

Miriam Makeba was living in exile in Guinea in 1974, and was globally famous. She was backed by a Guinean band at Zaire 74, as well as by Brazilian guitarist Sivuca. Makeba had been married to organiser Hugh Masekela from 1964 to 1966.

Orchestre Stukas were led by Lita Bembo and had a younger rock-influenced sound than the other performers. They were founded in 1968 as a James Brown cover band. The concert significantly raised their profile in Zaire. A reader's poll in Zairian newspaper Salongo voted Bembo the best musician of 1974.

Pembe Dance Troupe gave a traditional performance with 300 dancers and which ended with the audience chanting "Ali boma ye" ("Ali kill him" in Lingala, a reference to the boxing match that was to follow).

== Critical reception ==
Professional ratings
Review scores
| Source | Rating |
|---|---|
| Evening Standard | 4/5 stars |
| Exclaim! | 8/10 |
| Financial Times | 5/5 stars |
| The Guardian | 4/5 stars |
| PopMatters | 9/10 |
| Songlines | 4/5 stars |

Martin Sinnock of Songlines felt that Tabu Ley Rochereau was "at a creative peak", found Abeti to be "spectacular, despite her guitar-playing brother's aspirations to sound rather too much like Jimi Hendrix", and lauded the album as "a fascinating audio document of a remarkable event." In a review for PopMatters, Adriane Pontecorvo described the album as being "all full of glorious live energy." The Guardian called the album "thrilling stuff", and the Financial Times called it "faultless."

Vice described the sound quality as "fantastic", and PopMatters as "excellent", but Exclaim! called it "a bit thin, in the way a lot of live sets recorded during the decade sound." The performances were recorded on analogue 16-track equipment, with Shure SM57 and SM58 microphones placed close to the instruments. For the album release Stewart Levine described mixing the tracks to intentionally achieve a 1970s sound, "where it's punchy and happening."

== Track listing ==
Disc 1 track listing
| No. | Title | Artist | Length |
|---|---|---|---|
| 1. | "Introduction" | Tabu Ley Rochereau and Afrisa | 2:35 |
| 2. | "Celicia" | Tabu Ley Rochereau and Afrisa | 5:21 |
| 3. | "Salongo Part 1" | Tabu Ley Rochereau and Afrisa | 2:48 |
| 4. | "Salongo Part 2" | Tabu Ley Rochereau and Afrisa | 1:31 |
| 5. | "Annie" | Tabu Ley Rochereau and Afrisa | 7:25 |
| 6. | "Magali Ya Kinshasa" | Abumba Masekini | 6:49 |
| 7. | "Limbisa Nga" | Abumba Masekini | 4:57 |
| 8. | "Mobutu Praise Song 1" | Abeti | 3:33 |
| 9. | "Tuikale" | Abeti | 2:34 |
| 10. | "Liwela" | Abeti | 2:10 |
| 11. | "Traditional Folk Song" | Abeti | 3:04 |
| 12. | "Wandugo Wampenzi" | Abeti | 3:50 |
| 13. | "Bibile" | Abeti | 2:18 |
| 14. | "Mobutu Praise Song 2" | Abeti | 2:06 |
| Total length: | | | 51:01 |

Disc 2 track listing
| No. | Title | Artist | Length |
|---|---|---|---|
| 1. | "Introduction" | Franco and TPOK Jazz | 2:16 |
| 2. | "Nzoto" | Franco and TPOK Jazz | 1:52 |
| 3. | "Mosala" | Franco and TPOK Jazz | 2:37 |
| 4. | "Kasai" | Franco and TPOK Jazz | 2:48 |
| 5. | "Koni Ya Bonganga" | Franco and TPOK Jazz | 2:33 |
| 6. | "Balingaka Ngaite" | Franco and TPOK Jazz | 2:35 |
| 7. | "Mabuidi" | Franco and TPOK Jazz | 2:39 |
| 8. | "Instrumental Dance Chant" | Franco and TPOK Jazz | 2:45 |
| 9. | "Kizembike" | Franco and TPOK Jazz | 2:07 |
| 10. | "Lala Nzala" | Franco and TPOK Jazz | 2:58 |
| 11. | "Instrumental" | Franco and TPOK Jazz | 3:06 |
| 12. | "Umqhokozo" | Miriam Makeba | 2:40 |
| 13. | "Mobutu Praise Song" | Miriam Makeba | 3:12 |
| 14. | "West Wind" | Miriam Makeba | 6:50 |
| 15. | "Amampondo" | Miriam Makeba | 3:11 |
| 16. | "Biboma" | Orchestre Stukas | 3:02 |
| 17. | "Cherie" | Orchestre Stukas | 3:52 |
| 18. | "Mobutu Praise Song" | Orchestre Stukas | 3:38 |
| 19. | "Elatina" | Orchestre Stukas | 4:21 |
| 20. | "Pembe Dance Song" | Pembe Dance Troupe | 5:35 |
| Total length: | | | 64:36 |

== Personnel ==
- Mastering – Bernie Grundman
- Mixing – Sunny Levine
- Production – Hugh Masekela, Stewart Levine
