= Gugsa =

Gugsa is a male name of Ethiopian origin. It may refer to:

- Gugsa Araya Selassie
- Gugsa of Yejju
- Gugsa Welle
  - Gugsa Wale's rebellion
- Haile Selassie Gugsa
- Shimeket Gugesa (Shimeket Gugsa)
