= 2014 CAF Champions League =

50th edition of Africa's premier club football tournament

2014 Orange CAF Champions League
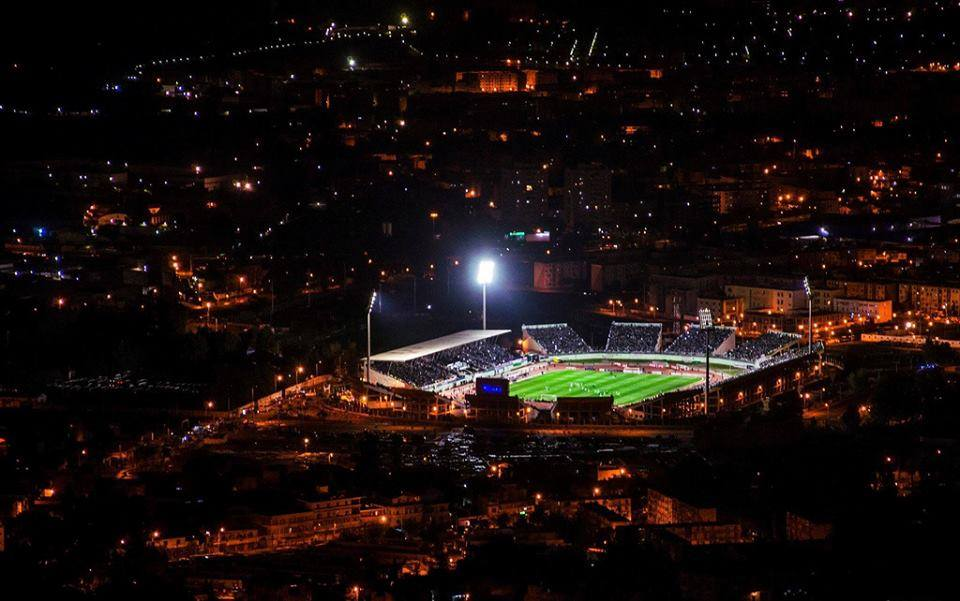
- The Mustapha Tchaker Stadium host the second leg final

Tournament details
- Dates: 7 February – 1 November 2014
- Teams: 58 (from 47 associations)

Final positions
- Champions: (Algeria) ES Sétif (2nd title)
- Runners-up: (Democratic Republic of the Congo) AS Vita Club

Tournament statistics
- Matches played: 126
- Goals scored: 313 (2.48 per match)
- Top scorer(s): (Algeria) El Hedi Belameiri (Tunisia) Haythem Jouini (Democratic Republic of the Congo) Ndombe Mubele (Tanzania) Mrisho Ngasa (6 goals each)

The 2014 CAF Champions League (also known as the 2014 Orange CAF Champions League for sponsorship reasons) was the 50th edition of Africa's premier club football tournament organized by the Confederation of African Football (CAF), and the 18th edition under the current CAF Champions League format. The two-time defending champions Al-Ahly were eliminated in the second round by Al-Ahly Benghazi.

In the final, ES Sétif of Algeria defeated AS Vita Club of the Democratic Republic of the Congo on the away goals rule after drawing 3–3 on aggregate, to win their second title. They qualified for the 2014 FIFA Club World Cup, and earned the right to play in the 2015 CAF Super Cup.

== Association team allocation ==
All 56 CAF member associations may enter the CAF Champions League, with the 12 highest-ranked associations according to their CAF 5-year ranking eligible to enter two teams in the competition. The title holders could also enter if they had not already qualified for the CAF Champions League. As a result, theoretically a maximum of 69 teams could enter the tournament – although this level has never been reached.

For the 2014 CAF Champions League, the CAF used the 2008–2012 CAF 5-year ranking, which calculated points for each entrant association based on their clubs’ performance over those 5 years in the CAF Champions League and CAF Confederation Cup. The criteria for points were the following:

	CAF Champions League	CAF Confederation Cup
Winners	5 points	4 points
Runners-up	4 points	3 points
Losing semi-finalists	3 points	2 points
3rd place in groups	2 points	1 point
4th place in groups	1 point	1 point

The points were multiplied by a coefficient according to the year as follows:

- 2012 – 5
- 2011 – 4
- 2010 – 3
- 2009 – 2
- 2008 – 1

== Teams ==
The following teams entered the competition. Teams in bold received a bye to the first round. The other teams entered the preliminary round.

Associations are shown according to their 2008–2012 CAF 5-year ranking – those with a ranking score have their rank and score indicated.

Association	Team(s)	Qualifying method
Associations eligible to enter two teams (ranked 1–12)
Tunisia (1st – 85 pts)	**CS Sfaxien**	2012–13 Tunisian Ligue Professionnelle 1 champions
Tunisia (1st – 85 pts)	**Espérance de Tunis**	2012–13 Tunisian Ligue Professionnelle 1 runners-up
Egypt (2nd – 70 pts)	**Al-Ahly**	Title holders (2013 CAF Champions League winners); 2010–11 Egyptian Premier League champions
Egypt (2nd – 70 pts)	Zamalek	2010–11 Egyptian Premier League runners-up
Nigeria (3rd – 63 pts)	Kano Pillars	2013 Nigeria Premier League champions
Nigeria (3rd – 63 pts)	Enyimba	2013 Nigeria Premier League runners-up
Sudan (4th – 54 pts)	Al-Merrikh	2013 Sudan Premier League champions
Sudan (4th – 54 pts)	**Al-Hilal**	2013 Sudan Premier League runners-up
Morocco (5th – 53 pts)	Raja Casablanca	2012–13 Botola champions
Morocco (5th – 53 pts)	FAR Rabat	2012–13 Botola runners-up
(Democratic Republic of the Congo) DR Congo (6th – 48 pts)	**TP Mazembe**	2013 Linafoot champions
(Democratic Republic of the Congo) DR Congo (6th – 48 pts)	AS Vita Club	2013 Linafoot runners-up
Algeria (7th – 40 pts)	ES Sétif (one entrant only)	2012–13 Algerian Ligue Professionnelle 1 champions
Mali (8th – 31 pts)	Stade Malien	2012–13 Malian Première Division champions
Mali (8th – 31 pts)	AS Real Bamako	2012–13 Malian Première Division runners-up
(Republic of the Congo) Congo (9th – 20 pts)	AC Léopards	2013 Congo Premier League champions
(Republic of the Congo) Congo (9th – 20 pts)	Diables Noirs	2013 Congo Premier League runners-up
Angola (10th – 18 pts)	Kabuscorp	2013 Girabola champions
Angola (10th – 18 pts)	Primeiro de Agosto	2013 Girabola runners-up
Cameroon (11th – 12 pts)	**Coton Sport**	2013 Elite One champions
Cameroon (11th – 12 pts)	Les Astres	2013 Elite One runners-up
Ghana (12th – 11 pts)	Asante Kotoko	2012–13 Ghanaian Premier League champions
Ghana (12th – 11 pts)	Berekum Chelsea	2012–13 Ghanaian Premier League runners-up
Associations eligible to enter one team
Zimbabwe (13th – 8 pts)	Dynamos	2013 Zimbabwe Premier Soccer League champions
Zambia (14th – 7 pts)	Nkana	2013 Zambian Premier League champions
Ivory Coast (T-15th – 6 pts)	Séwé Sport	2012–13 Côte d'Ivoire Ligue 1 champions
Libya (T-15th – 6 pts)	Al-Ahly Benghazi	2013–14 Libyan Premier League Group B leaders after Round 7
Niger (17th – 3 pts)	AS Douanes Niamey	2012–13 Niger Premier League champions
Botswana	Mochudi Centre Chiefs	2012–13 Botswana Premier League champions
Burkina Faso	ASFA Yennenga	2013 Burkinabé Premier League champions
Burundi	Flambeau de l’Est	2012–13 Burundi Premier League champions
Chad	Foullah Edifice	2013 Ligue de N'Djaména champions
Comoros	Komorozine	2013 Comoros Premier League champions
Equatorial Guinea	Akonangui	2013 Equatoguinean Premier League champions
Ethiopia	Dedebit	2012–13 Ethiopian Premier League champions
Gabon	US Bitam	2012–13 Gabon Championnat National D1 champions
(The Gambia) Gambia	Steve Biko	2013 GFA League First Division champions
Guinea	Horoya	2013 Guinée Championnat National champions
Guinea-Bissau	Os Balantas	2013 Campeonato Nacional da Guiné-Bissau champions
Kenya	Gor Mahia	2013 Kenyan Premier League champions
Lesotho	Lioli	2012–13 Lesotho Premier League champions
Liberia	Barrack Young Controllers	2013 Liberian Premier League champions
Madagascar	CNaPS Sport	2013 THB Champions League champions
Mauritania	FC Nouadhibou	2012–13 Mauritanian Premier League champions
Mozambique	Liga Muçulmana	2013 Moçambola champions
Namibia	Black Africa	2012–13 Namibia Premier League champions
Rwanda	Rayon Sports	2012–13 Primus National Football League champions
São Tomé and Príncipe	Sporting Praia Cruz	2013 São Tomé and Príncipe Championship champions
Senegal	Diambars	2013 Senegal Premier League champions
Seychelles	Côte d'Or	2013 Seychelles First Division champions
Sierra Leone	Diamond Stars	2013 Sierra Leone National Premier League champions
South Africa	Kaizer Chiefs	2012–13 Premier Soccer League champions
South Sudan	Atlabara	2013 South Sudan Football Championship champions
(Eswatini) Swaziland	Mbabane Swallows	2012–13 Swazi Premier League champions
Tanzania	Young Africans	2012–13 Tanzanian Premier League champions
Togo	Anges de Notsè	2013 Togolese Championnat National champions
Uganda	Kampala City Council	2012–13 Uganda Super League champions
Zanzibar	KMKM	2012–13 Zanzibar Premier League champions

Notes

1. Algeria (ALG): USM El Harrach, the 2012–13 Algerian Ligue Professionnelle 1 runners-up, withdrew after the draw was held. Sporting Praia Cruz, the 2013 São Tomé and Príncipe Championship champions, were allowed by the CAF to replace them in the draw.
2. Egypt (EGY): The 2012–13 Egyptian Premier League champions and runners-up would originally represent Egypt in this tournament, but due to its cancellation, the 2010–11 Egyptian Premier League champions and runners-up (last completed season) were selected to represent Egypt instead.

The following associations did not enter a team:

- Benin
- Cape Verde
- Central African Republic
- Djibouti
- Eritrea
- Malawi
- Mauritius
- Réunion
- Somalia

== Schedule ==
The schedule of the competition was as follows (all draws held at CAF headquarters in Cairo, Egypt unless otherwise stated).

Phase	Round	Draw date	First leg	Second leg
Qualifying	Preliminary round	16 December 2013 (Marrakesh, Morocco)	7–9 February 2014	14–16 February 2014
Qualifying	First round	16 December 2013 (Marrakesh, Morocco)	28 February–2 March 2014	7–9 March 2014
Qualifying	Second round	16 December 2013 (Marrakesh, Morocco)	21–23 March 2014	28–30 March 2014
Group stage	Matchday 1	29 April 2014	16–18 May 2014	
Group stage	Matchday 2	29 April 2014	23–25 May 2014	
Group stage	Matchday 3	29 April 2014	6–8 June 2014	
Group stage	Matchday 4	29 April 2014	25–27 July 2014	
Group stage	Matchday 5	29 April 2014	8–10 August 2014	
Group stage	Matchday 6	29 April 2014	22–24 August 2014	
Knock-out stage	Semi-finals	29 April 2014	19–21 September 2014	26–28 September 2014
Knock-out stage	Final	29 April 2014	24–26 October 2014	31 October–2 November 2014

== Qualifying rounds ==
The draw for the preliminary, first and second qualifying rounds was held on 16 December 2013.

Qualification ties were played on a home-and-away two-legged basis. If the sides were level on aggregate after the second leg, the away goals rule was applied, and if still level, the tie proceeded directly to a penalty shoot-out (no extra time was played).

=== Preliminary round ===
Team 1	Agg.	Team 2	1st leg	2nd leg
Young Africans (Tanzania)	12–2	(Comoros) Komorozine	7–0	5–2
Berekum Chelsea (Ghana)	2–2 (3–0 p)	(South Sudan) Atlabara	2–0	0–2
Al-Ahly Benghazi (Libya)	4–2	(Chad) Foullah Edifice	4–0	0–2
Gor Mahia (Kenya)	1–1 (4–2 p)	(Gabon) US Bitam	1–0	0–1
Enyimba (Nigeria)	4–3	(Togo) Anges de Notsè	3–1	1–2
FAR Rabat (Morocco)	3–3 (a)	(Mali) AS Real Bamako	2–2	1–1
Les Astres (Cameroon)	4–0	(Equatorial Guinea) Akonangui	3–0	1–0
Asante Kotoko (Ghana)	2–2 (a)	(Liberia) Barrack Young Controllers	2–1	0–1
Séwé Sport (Ivory Coast)	w/o	(Guinea-Bissau) Os Balantas	—	—
Dedebit (Ethiopia)	3–2	(Zanzibar) KMKM	3–0	0–2
FC Nouadhibou (Mauritania)	1–4	(Guinea) Horoya	1–1	0–3
Raja Casablanca (Morocco)	8–1	(Sierra Leone) Diamond Stars	6–0	2–1
Diables Noirs (Republic of the Congo)	1–2	(Burundi) Flambeau de l’Est	0–1	1–1
ES Sétif (Algeria)	w/o	(The Gambia) Steve Biko	—	—
Diambars (Senegal)	1–1 (2–4 p)	(Burkina Faso) ASFA Yennenga	1–0	0–1
Sporting Praia Cruz (São Tomé and Príncipe)	3–7	(Mali) Stade Malien	3–2	0–5
AC Léopards (Republic of the Congo)	2–2 (a)	(Rwanda) Rayon Sports	0–0	2–2
Primeiro de Agosto (Angola)	3–2	(Lesotho) Lioli	2–0	1–2
Kaizer Chiefs (South Africa)	4–1	(Namibia) Black Africa	3–0	1–1
Liga Muçulmana (Mozambique)	1–0	(Madagascar) CNaPS Sport	1–0	0–0
Dynamos (Zimbabwe)	4–1	(Botswana) Mochudi Centre Chiefs	3–0	1–1
AS Vita Club (Democratic Republic of the Congo)	4–3	(Nigeria) Kano Pillars	3–1	1–2
Zamalek (Egypt)	3–0	(Niger) AS Douanes Niamey	2–0	1–0
Kabuscorp (Angola)	7–2	(Seychelles) Côte d'Or	5–1	2–1
Mbabane Swallows (Eswatini)	4–5	(Zambia) Nkana	2–0	2–5
Al-Merrikh (Sudan)	2–3	(Uganda) Kampala City Council	0–2	2–1

Notes

1. Séwé Sport advanced to the first round after Os Balantas withdrew.
2. ES Sétif advanced to the first round after Steve Biko withdrew.

=== First round ===
Team 1	Agg.	Team 2	1st leg	2nd leg
Young Africans (Tanzania)	1–1 (3–4 p)	(Egypt) Al-Ahly	1–0	0–1
Berekum Chelsea (Ghana)	1–3	(Libya) Al-Ahly Benghazi	1–1	0–2
Gor Mahia (Kenya)	2–8	(Tunisia) Espérance de Tunis	2–3	0–5
Enyimba (Nigeria)	2–2 (a)	(Mali) AS Real Bamako	1–2	1–0
Les Astres (Cameroon)	1–4	(Democratic Republic of the Congo) TP Mazembe	1–1	0–3
Barrack Young Controllers (Liberia)	3–4	(Ivory Coast) Séwé Sport	3–3	0–1
Dedebit (Ethiopia)	1–4	(Tunisia) CS Sfaxien	1–2	0–2
Horoya (Guinea)	1–1 (5–4 p)	(Morocco) Raja Casablanca	1–0	0–1
Flambeau de l’Est (Burundi)	1–5	(Cameroon) Coton Sport	1–0	0–5
ES Sétif (Algeria)	5–0	(Burkina Faso) ASFA Yennenga	5–0	0–0
Stade Malien (Mali)	0–2	(Sudan) Al-Hilal	0–0	0–2
AC Léopards (Republic of the Congo)	4–3	(Angola) Primeiro de Agosto	4–1	0–2
Kaizer Chiefs (South Africa)	7–0	(Mozambique) Liga Muçulmana	4–0	3–0
Dynamos (Zimbabwe)	0–1	(Democratic Republic of the Congo) AS Vita Club	0–0	0–1
Zamalek (Egypt)	1–0	(Angola) Kabuscorp	1–0	0–0
Nkana (Zambia)	4–3	(Uganda) Kampala City Council	2–2	2–1

=== Second round ===
Team 1	Agg.	Team 2	1st leg	2nd leg
Al-Ahly Benghazi (Libya)	4–2	(Egypt) Al-Ahly	1–0	3–2
AS Real Bamako (Mali)	1–4	(Tunisia) Espérance de Tunis	1–1	0–3
Séwé Sport (Ivory Coast)	2–2 (a)	(Democratic Republic of the Congo) TP Mazembe	2–1	0–1
Horoya (Guinea)	0–3	(Tunisia) CS Sfaxien	0–1	0–2
ES Sétif (Algeria)	2–0	(Cameroon) Coton Sport	1–0	1–0
AC Léopards (Republic of the Congo)	1–1 (a)	(Sudan) Al-Hilal	1–1	0–0
AS Vita Club (Democratic Republic of the Congo)	3–2	(South Africa) Kaizer Chiefs	3–0	0–2
Nkana (Zambia)	0–5	(Egypt) Zamalek	0–0	0–5

The losers of the second round entered the 2014 CAF Confederation Cup play-off round.

== Group stage ==
Location of teams of the 2014 CAF Champions League group stage.
Group A
Group B

The draw for the group stage was held on 29 April 2014. The eight teams were drawn into two groups of four. Each group was played on a home-and-away round-robin basis. The winners and runners-up of each group advanced to the semi-finals.

Tiebreakers
The teams are ranked according to points (3 points for a win, 1 point for a draw, 0 points for a loss). If tied on points, tiebreakers are applied in the following order:
1. Number of points obtained in games between the teams concerned
2. Goal difference in games between the teams concerned
3. Away goals scored in games between the teams concerned
4. Goal difference in all games
5. Goals scored in all games.

=== Group A ===
Pos	Team	Pld	W	D	L	GF	GA	GD	Pts	Qualification	TPM	ASV	HIL	ZAM
1	(Democratic Republic of the Congo) TP Mazembe	6	3	2	1	5	2	+3	11 (Note: Tiebreakers: TP Mazembe and AS Vita Club are ranked on head-to-head record.)	Advance to knockout stage	—	1–0	3–1	1–0
2	(Democratic Republic of the Congo) AS Vita Club	6	3	2	1	6	4	+2	11	Advance to knockout stage	0–0	—	2–1	2–1
3	(Sudan) Al-Hilal	6	2	1	3	7	9	−2	7		1–0	1–1	—	2–1
4	(Egypt) Zamalek	6	1	1	4	4	7	−3	4		0–0	0–1	2–1	—

Source: CAF
Rules for classification: Group stage tiebreakers

=== Group B ===
Pos	Team	Pld	W	D	L	GF	GA	GD	Pts		CSS	ESS	EST	AHB
1	(Tunisia) CS Sfaxien	6	3	2	1	8	5	+3	11	Advance to knockout stage	—	1–1	1–0	3–1
2	(Algeria) ES Sétif	6	2	4	0	9	6	+3	10	Advance to knockout stage	1–1	—	2–2	1–1
3	(Tunisia) Espérance de Tunis	6	2	1	3	8	9	−1	7		2–1	1–2	—	1–0
4	(Libya) Al-Ahly Benghazi	6	1	1	4	5	10	−5	4		0–1	0–2	3–2	—

Source: CAF
Rules for classification: Group stage tiebreakers

== Knockout stage ==
Knock-out ties were played on a home-and-away two-legged basis. If the sides were level on aggregate after the second leg, the away goals rule was applied, and if still level, the tie proceeded directly to a penalty shoot-out (no extra time was played).

=== Bracket ===
Semi-finals
1	(Democratic Republic of the Congo) AS Vita Club	2	2	4
4	(Tunisia) CS Sfaxien	1	1	2
3	(Algeria) ES Sétif (a)	2	2	4
2	(Democratic Republic of the Congo) TP Mazembe	1	3	4

Final
(Democratic Republic of the Congo) AS Vita Club	2	1	3
(Algeria) ES Sétif (a)	2	1	3

=== Semi-finals ===
In the semi-finals, the group A winners played the group B runners-up, and the group B winners played the group A runners-up, with the group winners hosting the second leg.

Team 1	Agg.	Team 2	1st leg	2nd leg
AS Vita Club (Democratic Republic of the Congo)	4–2	(Tunisia) CS Sfaxien	2–1	2–1
ES Sétif (Algeria)	4–4 (a)	(Democratic Republic of the Congo) TP Mazembe	2–1	2–3

=== Final ===
In the final, the order of legs was decided by a draw, held after the group stage draw.

26 October 2014
15:30 UTC+1

AS Vita Club (Democratic Republic of the Congo)	2–2	(Algeria) ES Sétif
Mabidi 45+3' (pen.), 77'	Report	Mubele 17' (o.g.); Djahnit 57'

Stade Tata Raphaël, Kinshasa
Attendance: 40,000
Referee: Janny Sikazwe (Zambia)
1 November 2014
19:15 UTC+1

ES Sétif (Algeria)	1–1	(Democratic Republic of the Congo) AS Vita Club
Younès 50'	Report	Mabidi 54'

Stade Mustapha Tchaker, Blida
Attendance: 35,000
Referee: Bakary Gassama (Gambia)

== Champions ==
CAF Champions League
2014 Winners

ES Sétif
Second Title

== Top scorers ==
Rank	Player	Team	Goals
1	(Algeria) El Hedi Belameiri	(Algeria) ES Sétif	6
1	(Tunisia) Haythem Jouini	(Tunisia) Espérance de Tunis	6
1	(Democratic Republic of the Congo) Ndombe Mubele	(Democratic Republic of the Congo) AS Vita Club	6
1	(Tanzania) Mrisho Ngasa	(Tanzania) Young Africans	6
5	(Morocco) Mouhcine Iajour	(Morocco) Raja Casablanca	5
5	(Zimbabwe) Knowledge Musona	(South Africa) Kaizer Chiefs	5
5	(Zimbabwe) Edward Sadomba	(Libya) Al-Ahly Benghazi	5
8	(Tunisia) Ahmed Akaïchi	(Tunisia) Espérance de Tunis	4
8	(Tunisia) Fakhreddine Ben Youssef	(Tunisia) CS Sfaxien	4
8	(Sudan) Mudather Careca	(Sudan) Al-Hilal	4
8	(Algeria) Akram Djahnit	(Algeria) ES Sétif	4
8	(Rwanda) Tady Etekiama	(Democratic Republic of the Congo) AS Vita Club	4
8	(Rwanda) Lema Mabidi	(Democratic Republic of the Congo) AS Vita Club	4
8	(Algeria) Sofiane Younès	(Algeria) ES Sétif	4

== See also ==
- 2014 CAF Confederation Cup
- 2014 FIFA Club World Cup
- 2015 CAF Super Cup
