= 2013 Elite One =

Elite One
- Season: 2013

The 2013 Elite One was the 53rd season of the Cameroon Top League.

== League table ==
Pos	Team	Pld	W	D	L	GF	GA	GD	Pts	Qualification or relegation
1	Cotonsport (C)	26	13	7	6	45	20	+25	46	2014 CAF Champions League
2	Les Astres	26	13	5	8	29	20	+9	44	2014 CAF Champions League
3	Union Douala	26	11	8	7	35	22	+13	41	2014 CAF Confederation Cup
4	Unisport Bafang	26	10	10	6	18	16	+2	40	
5	Canon	26	7	14	5	23	27	−4	35	
6	Fovu Club	26	9	7	10	25	23	+2	34	
7	Njala Quan	26	8	10	8	29	25	+4	34	
8	Renaissance	26	8	8	10	26	33	−7	32	
9	Yong Sports Academy	26	8	10	8	16	22	−6	31 (Note: 3 points deducted.)	2014 CAF Confederation Cup (Note: 2013 Cameroonian Cup winners.)
10	Douala AC	26	8	7	11	26	26	0	31	
11	New Star	26	6	12	8	23	29	−6	30	
12	Panthère	26	5	14	7	18	28	−10	29	
13	Sable Batié	26	6	8	12	13	24	−11	26	
14	Tonnerre	26	6	8	12	19	30	−11	26	

Updated to match(es) played on 16 March 2015. Source: https://www.rsssf.org/tablesk/kam2013.html
Rules for classification: 1) points; 2) head-to-head results
(C) Champions
Notes:

Owing to an expansion of the 2014 Elite One into 19 teams, no teams were relegated.
