= Fasiledes Stadium =

Stadium in Gondar, Ethiopia

- Full name: Fasiledes Stadium
- Location: Gonder (Amhara Region), Ethiopia
- Capacity: 20,000
- Surface: Grass

Construction
- Renovated: 2010

Tenants
- Fasil Kenema SC (1968–present); Dashen Beer FC (2004–2016); Ethiopia national football team (selected matches)

Fasiledes Stadium (Amharic: ፋሲልደስ ስታዲየም) is a stadium in Gonder, Ethiopia.

== History ==
The stadium is named after Emperor Fasiledes. The stadium is home to Fasil Kenema SC and until 2016 Dashen Beer FC. The stadium has hosted Ethiopian Premier League matches.
