= Thierry Kasereka =

Congolese footballer

Personal information
- Full name: Thierry Kasereka Mugeni
- Date of birth: 2 July 1988 (age 38)
- Place of birth: Goma, Zaïre
- Height: 1.80 m (5 ft 11 in)
- Position: Defender

Team information
- Current team: AS Nyuki

Senior career*
Years	Team	Apps	(Gls)
2007–2017	AS Vita Club		
2015	→ Al-Hilal (loan)		
2016	→ FC Renaissance du Congo (loan)		
2017–2018	AS Dauphins Noirs		
2018–	AS Nyuki		

International career^{‡}
2011–2014	DR Congo	7	(0)
- * Club domestic league appearances and goals as of 14 June 2021 ‡ National team caps and goals as of 14 June 2021

Thierry Kasereka (born 2 July 1988) is a Congolese football defender who plays for AS Nyuki.
