= Daouda Nabi =

Burkinabé footballer

Personal information
- Date of birth: 31 December 1989 (age 36)
- Place of birth: Koudougou, Burkina Faso
- Position: Midfielder

Team information
- Current team: ASFA Yennenga

Senior career*
Years	Team	Apps	(Gls)
2004–2010	AJEB Bobo-Dioulasso		
2010–2012	RC Bobo Dioulasso		
2013–	ASFA Yennenga		

International career^{‡}
2015	Burkina Faso	1	(0)
- * Club domestic league appearances and goals as of 13 June 2021 ‡ National team caps and goals as of 13 June 2021

Daouda Nabi (born 31 December 1989) is a Burkinabé football midfielder who plays for ASFA Yennenga.
