= Balla Camara (footballer) =

Guinean footballer

Personal information
- Date of birth: 7 July 1988 (age 38)
- Place of birth: Conakry, Guinea
- Height: 1.79 m (5 ft 10 in)
- Position: Forward

Senior career*
Years	Team	Apps	(Gls)
–2013	Ashanti GB		
2013–2015	Horoya AC		
2015–2017	Santoba FC		

International career^{‡}
2013	Guinea	2	(0)
- * Club domestic league appearances and goals as of 13 June 2021 ‡ National team caps and goals as of 13 June 2021

Balla Camara (born 7 July 1988) is a retired Guinean football striker.
