= Tony Odur =

Ugandan footballer (born 1984)

Personal information
- Date of birth: 7 December 1984 (age 41)
- Place of birth: Lukuli, Uganda
- Height: 1.62 m (5 ft 4 in)
- Position: Midfielder

Team information
- Current team: Onduparaka fc

Senior career*
Years	Team	Apps	(Gls)
2003–2006	Express FC		
2006–2007	Brabrand IF	14	(0)
2007–2009	Bunamwaya SC		
2009–2010	Express FC		
2010–2012	Bunamwaya SC		
2012–2014	KCCA FC		
2014–2015	Nkana FC		
2015–2016	Express FC		
2016–2018	Vipers SC		
2018–2019	Express FC		
2019–2020	Katwe United		

International career
2006–2015	Uganda	13	(1)
- * Club domestic league appearances and goals

Tony Odur (born 7 December 1984) is a Ugandan footballer who last played for Katwe United in Uganda. Odur has also made appearances for the Uganda national football team. In March 2010 Odur scored a memorable hat trick against Burundi in CHAN qualifiers.

== 2014 CAF Champions League ==
In CAF Champions League 2014, KCCA FC vs El Merriekih Tony Odur went on a score sheet with one goal and another one from teammate Herman Wasswa to secure an away win against the Sudanese-based El Merriekih in the 1st leg, he also scored the only goal in the 2nd leg in which KCAA FC lost to El Merriekih at home, kampala, aggregate 3–2 in favour of KCCA FC.

In CAF champions league 2014 Nkana vs KCCA FC, Odur scored a goal in the 26th in a game which end in 2–2 draw, and this made him the only player of KCCA to score in three games in CAF Champions league 2014 tournament.

== 2003 to present ==
Odur broke onto the scene in 2003 as an youngster at Express FC. Together with Mark Mwambo in midfield, they came off the bench at the CECAFA club Championships. At the end of that season, they helped Express win the Kakungulu Cup. Odur scored a late equalizer in the 2004 Kakungulu Cup final against KCC.

However, Odur is an aggressive player who would want his team to win at all costs. Odur joined Bunamwaya. He also had a professional trials stint in Denmark although he was not successful, and Tony had this to say, "I need to get a shot at such an opportunity again and that's why I'm working hard."

In April 2014, Tony went to Vietnam to hally work on his dream of playing in others outside League, so he directed to Vietnam-based team, Sai Gon FC for trials April 2014. In 2014 Tony missed out a crucial match in Uganda Cup, semifinals against Sc Victoria University at Phillip Omondi Stadium, due to a knee injury but KCCF won the game 2-1

== Achievements and honours ==
- Kakungulu Cup 2003 with Express FC
- CECAFA under-12 championship in Eritrea in 1997
- Fufa super league 2012/2013 with KCCA FC.
- Fufa super league 2013/2014 with KCCA FC
