= Solomon Jabason =

Nigerian footballer

Personal information
- Full name: Solomon Azi Jabason
- Date of birth: 12 December 1991 (age 34)
- Position: Midfielder

Senior career*
Years	Team	Apps	(Gls)
2010–2011	Wikki Tourists		
2012	Akwa United		
2013	Enugu Rangers		
2013	Wikki Tourists		
2014–2015	Al-Ahly		
2015–2016	Al-Merrikh		
2017	Al-Hilal		

International career^{‡}
2012	Nigeria	1	(0)
- * Club domestic league appearances and goals as of 13 June 2021 ‡ National team caps and goals as of 13 June 2021

Solomon Jabason (born 12 December 1991) is a Nigerian football midfielder.
