= Weha Serawoch =

Ethiopian football club

- Ground: Weha Serawoch Stadium, Ethiopia
- Capacity: 5,000
- League: Ethiopian Premier League

Weha Serawoch is an Ethiopian football club. They play in the Ethiopian Premier League, the top level of professional football in Ethiopia.

- Ethiopian football site
