= Patrick Mampuya Lema =

Congolese footballer

Personal information
- Full name: Patrick Mampuya Lema
- Date of birth: 27 May 1985 (age 41)
- Place of birth: Kinshasa, Zaïre
- Height: 1.82 m (6 ft 0 in)
- Position: Defender

Team information
- Current team: FC Saint-Éloi Lupopo

Senior career*
Years	Team	Apps	(Gls)
2003–2015	AS Vita Club		
2015–2016	FC Saint-Éloi Lupopo		
2017–2018	AS Maniema Union		
2018–	FC Saint-Éloi Lupopo		

International career
2011–2013	DR Congo	7	(0)
- * Club domestic league appearances and goals

Patrick Mampuya Lema (born 27 May 1985) is a Congolese football defender who plays for FC Saint-Éloi Lupopo.
