= Amadou Samaké =

Malian footballer

Personal information
- Full name: N´Tji Amadou Samaké
- Date of birth: 20 July 1995 (age 31)
- Place of birth: Mali
- Height: 1.82 m (6 ft 0 in)
- Positions: Striker; winger

Team information
- Current team: Darnes
- Number: 28

Youth career
- 2013–2014: AS Real Bamako

Senior career*
Years	Team	Apps	(Gls)
2014–2015	AS Real Bamako		
2015–2017	Stade Malien		
2017–2018	Onze Créateurs		
2018–2019	Kawkab Marrakech		
2019–2021	OC Safi		
2021	Al-Orouba		
2021–2022	Al-Lewaa		
2022	Darnes		
- * Club domestic league appearances and goals as of 13 April 2022 (UTC)

Amadou Samaké (born 20 July 1995) is a Malian professional footballer who plays as a striker for Libyan Premier League club Darnes.

== Honours ==
Stade Malien

- Malien Première Division: 2014–15, 2016
