= Bawaka Mabele =

Congolese footballer

Personal information
- Full name: Bawakw Mabele
- Date of birth: 9 June 1988 (age 38)
- Place of birth: Kinshasa, Zaïre
- Height: 1.72 m (5 ft 8 in)
- Position: Defender

Team information
- Current team: JS Kinshasa

Senior career*
Years	Team	Apps	(Gls)
2007–2011	TP Mazembe		
2012–2013	US Tshinkunku		
2013–2017	AS Vita Club		
2018–	JS Kinshasa		

International career^{‡}
2009–2015	DR Congo	6	(0)
- * Club domestic league appearances and goals as of 14 June 2021 ‡ National team caps and goals as of 14 June 2021

Bawaka Mabele (born 9 June 1988) is a Congolese football defender who plays for JS Kinshasa.
