= Zaire 74 =

Music festival in Zaire in 1974

- Genre: Soul music, African music
- Dates: 22 to 24 September 1974
- Locations: Kinshasa, Zaire
- Founders: Hugh Masekela, Stewart Levine
- Attendance: 80,000

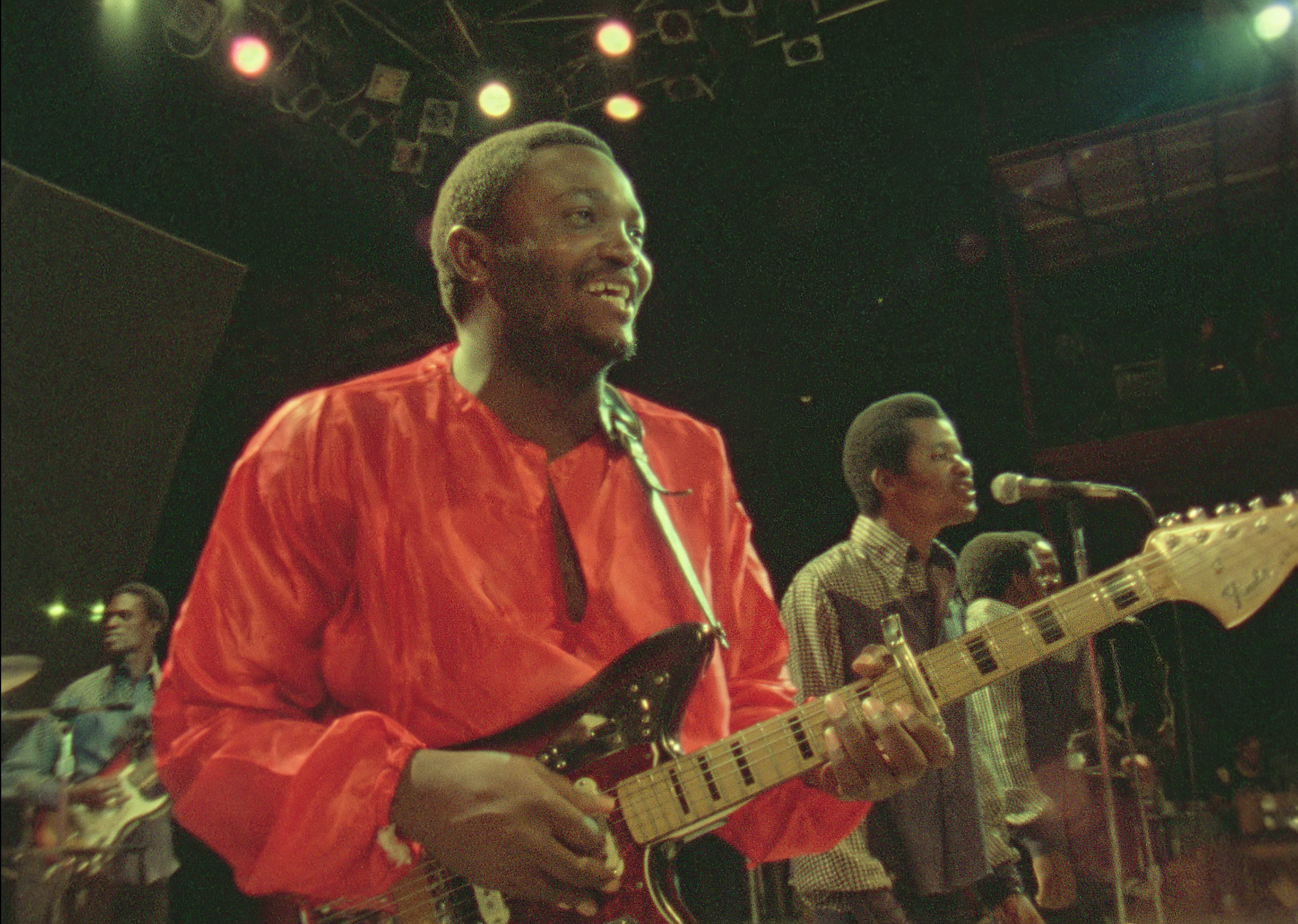
Franco Luambo and his OK Jazz orchestra in a live concert at Zaire 74.

Zaire 74 was a three-day live music festival that took place on 22 to 24 September 1974 at the Stade du 20 Mai in Kinshasa, Zaire (now Democratic Republic of the Congo). The concert, conceived by South African trumpeter Hugh Masekela and record producer Stewart Levine, was meant to be a major promotional event for The Rumble in the Jungle heavyweight boxing championship match between George Foreman and Muhammad Ali. When an eye injury forced Foreman to postpone the fight by six weeks, the music festival's intended audience of international tourists was all but eliminated and Levine had to decide whether or not to cancel the event. The decision was made to move forward, and 80,000 people attended.

In addition to promoting the Ali-Foreman fight, the Zaire 74 event was intended to present and promote racial and cultural solidarity between African American and African people. Thirty-one performing groups—17 from Zaire and 14 from overseas—performed. Featured performers included top R&B and soul artists from the United States such as James Brown, Bill Withers, B.B. King, and The Spinners as well as prominent African performers such as Miriam Makeba, Zaïko Langa Langa, TPOK Jazz, and Tabu Ley Rochereau. Other performers included Celia Cruz and the Fania All-Stars.

== Background and cultural influence ==
The concert was promoted by Don King as part of the build-up to the Muhammad Ali vs. George Foreman heavyweight title bout, known as the Rumble in the Jungle.

At the time, Zaire was ruled by Mobutu Sese Seko, a dictator who sought to use international events to improve his country's global image and reinforce nationalist pride. By hosting the festival, Mobutu aimed to project Zaire as a modern African nation and bolster his regime's cultural legitimacy.

The event was documented extensively by filmmaker Leon Gast, who shot over 125 hours of footage. However, the film reels were tied up in legal and financial disputes for decades, largely due to control by the original Liberian investors behind the festival's funding. Gast's footage was first seen in the 1996 Oscar-winning documentary When We Were Kings, which focused on the Ali–Foreman fight and included limited concert clips. In 2009, a standalone concert documentary, Soul Power, directed by Jeffrey Levy-Hinte (editor of When We Were Kings), was released using only the festival footage.

In addition to these two documentaries, several individual performances from Zaire 74 have been released as standalone concert films, including B.B. King: Live in Africa (1998), The Pointer Sisters: Live in Africa (VHS 1989, LaserDisc 1990), and Celia Cruz and the Fania All-Stars: Live in Africa (DVD 2009). These films present full-length performances that were previously unreleased, offering rare glimpses into the depth and variety of the festival's musical program.

In 2017, a compilation album titled Zaïre 74: The African Artists was released, featuring performances by Congolese legends such as Franco, Tabu Ley Rochereau, Orchestre Stukas, and Miriam Makeba, marking the first official release of much of the African music from the event.

Though only portions of James Brown's headlining set are seen in Soul Power, a bootleg audio recording of his full performance—over an hour long—has surfaced online. The performance, which featured classics like "Soul Power", "Say It Loud – I'm Black and I'm Proud", and "Please, Please, Please", is considered one of the festival's highlights. As of 2024, no official full-length video release of Brown's complete set has been issued.

== Daily schedule and performances ==
The Zaire 74 festival took place over three nights, from 22 to 24 September 1974, at the Stade du 20 Mai. Each evening featured a combination of internationally known soul and Latin artists alongside major African performers from Zaire and beyond. The following is a reconstructed schedule based on archival footage from the documentary Soul Power, the concert film Live in Africa, and the 2017 compilation album Zaïre 74: The African Artists, which captured many of the African performances.

Day 1 – Sunday, 22 September 1974

- Zaïko Langa Langa – Congolese rumba band from Zaire (very first performance)
- Pembe Dance Troupe – Traditional Congolese stilt dancers and drummers (interspersed between sets)
- Abumba Masikini – Guitarist; performed "Magali Ya Kinshasa" and "Limbisa Nga"
- Abeti Masikini – Rumba/funk singer; performed songs including "Tuikale" and "Mobutu Praise Song"
- Bill Withers – Performed "Hope She'll Be Happier", "Ain't No Sunshine", and "Harlem"
- The Crusaders – Jazz-funk band; performed "Put It Where You Want It"
- Tabu Ley Rochereau & Afrisa International – Performed "Seli-Ja", "Salongo", and "Annie"
- Fania All-Stars feat. Celia Cruz – Performed "Quimbara", "Guantanamera", "Mi Gente", "El Ratón", and "Ponte Duro"

Day 2 – Monday, 23 September 1974

- Trio Madjesi & Orchestre Sosoliso – Soukous trio with comedic performance
- Franco & TPOK Jazz – Performed a full rumba set including "Koni Ya Bonganga", "Kinsiona", and "Monzo"
- The Spinners – American soul vocal group; performed "One of a Kind (Love Affair)"
- Miriam Makeba – Performed "Amampondo", "The Click Song (Umqokozo)", and "West Wind"
- Orchestre Stukas feat. Lita Bembo – High-energy soukous band; performed "Biboma" and "Elatina"
- B.B. King – Blues legend B.B. King delivered a powerful and emotionally charged performance at Zaire 74, backed by a full band and horn section. His set, which blended soulful vocals with raw, expressive guitar solos, provided a striking counterpoint to the funk and rumba acts featured throughout the festival. King's performance was featured prominently in the documentary Soul Power and released in full on the concert album and film B.B. King: Live in Africa (1974). His setlist included: "To Know You Is to Love You", "I Got Some Outside Help (I Don't Really Need)", "Why I Sing the Blues", "Ain't Nobody Home", "Sweet Sixteen", "The Thrill Is Gone", "Guess Who", and "I Like to Live the Love".

Day 3 – Tuesday, 24 September 1974

- Sister Sledge – Performed early R&B material including "On and On"
- Big Black – American percussionist Big Black (born Danny Rey), known for his Afro-Cuban conga playing and collaborations with jazz greats such as Randy Weston and Freddie Hubbard, gave a solo conga performance during the daytime segment of Day 3. His set, while not officially listed in festival promotional materials, is partially featured in the documentary Soul Power, where he delivers a powerful, rhythm-driven interlude on stage. Though brief, his appearance served as a symbolic bridge between African-American musical traditions and their African roots.
- The Pointer Sisters – The Pointer Sisters got things moving the final night of Zaire 74 with a lively and theatrical 40-minute set that blended jazz, swing, R&B, and funk. Their performance showcased the group's early versatility, featuring everything from scat-heavy standards to soul anthems like “Yes We Can.” As one of the few American female acts on the lineup, they energized the crowd with tight harmonies, dance routines, and vintage showmanship. Their full performance was later released on DVD as Pointer Sisters – Live in Africa.
- James Brown & The J.B.'s – The Godfather of Soul headlined the final night of Zaire 74 with a high-energy, marathon performance backed by his legendary band, The J.B.'s, featuring Bootsy Collins, Fred Wesley, and Maceo Parker. His set included a mix of funk anthems, soul ballads, and show-stopping classics, delivered with his trademark intensity and choreography. Featured prominently in the documentary Soul Power and later released in full on the concert film Live in Zaire, the performance brought the festival to a climactic close. In a last-minute move, President Mobutu opened the stadium to the public, allowing more than 80,000 people to witness Brown's unforgettable set.

== See also ==
- List of historic rock festivals
- List of jam band music festivals
