= Vincent Tchalla =

Nigerian-Togolese footballer

Personal information
- Full name: Vincent Orode Tchalla
- Date of birth: 7 October 1987 (age 39)
- Place of birth: Kaduna, Nigeria
- Height: 1.78 m (5 ft 10 in)
- Position: Striker

Team information
- Current team: Akanda FC

Youth career
- 2003–2006: ASKO Kara

Senior career*
Years	Team	Apps	(Gls)
2006–2008	ASKO Kara	30	(15)
2008–2009	Club Africain	5	(2)
2009–2010	→ CA Bizertin (loan)	2	(0)
2010–2011	Al-Arabi (UAE)		
2014–2015	Anges FC		
2015–	Akanda FC		

International career
2004–2007	Togo U-20	28	(12)
2008–	Togo	2	(0)
- * Club domestic league appearances and goals

Vincent Orode Tchalla (born 7 October 1987) is a Nigerian-Togolese football striker, who plays for Akanda FC.

== Career ==
Tchalla began his career by ASKO Kara and joined in summer 2008 to Tunisia who signed for Club Africain, he scored in his first season in the CLP-1 five goals, on 21 November 2008 turned back after visa problems. Tchalla signed for the 2009 season for Club Athlétique Bizertin a loan contract and will turned back in January 2010 to Club Africain.

== International career ==
Tchalla was called up on 20 November 2008 for a friendly game for the Togo national game against Rwanda national football team.
