= Herman Wasswa =

Ugandan footballer (born 1993)

Personal information
- Full name: Herman Wasswa Nteza
- Date of birth: 14 December 1993 (age 32)
- Place of birth: Masaka, Uganda
- Position: Midfielder

Team information
- Current team: Police FC

Senior career*
Years	Team	Apps	(Gls)
2010–2012	Masaka Local Council	18	(12)
2011–2012	SC Villa		
2013–2016	Kampala CCA		
2015	→ Sofapaka (loan)	8	(2)
2016–2017	Express FC		
2017	Lusaka Dynamos		
2017–2018	URA SC		
2018–2019	Maroons FC	12	(1)
2019–	Police FC	6	(1)

International career^{‡}
2013	Uganda	1	(0)
- * Club domestic league appearances and goals as of 13 July 2020 ‡ National team caps and goals as of 13 June 2021

Herman Wasswa (born 14 December 1993) is a Ugandan football midfielder who plays for Police FC.
