= Washington Pakamisa =

Zimbabwean footballer (born 1984)

Personal information
- Date of birth: 15 October 1984 (age 42)
- Place of birth: Harare, Zimbabwe
- Height: 1.75 m (5 ft 9 in)
- Position: Striker

Team information
- Current team: Mutare City Rovers

Senior career*
Years	Team	Apps	(Gls)
2004–2008	CAPS United		
2009	Gunners		
2010	Kiglon Bird		
2011–2012	CAPS United		
2013–2014	Dynamos		
2015	Liga Desportiva de Maputo		
2016–2017	Ngezi Platinum		
2018–	Mutare City Rovers		

International career^{‡}
2007	Zimbabwe	3	(0)
- * Club domestic league appearances and goals as of 13 July 2020 ‡ National team caps and goals as of 13 June 2021

Washington Pakamisa (born 15 October 1984) is a Zimbabwean football striker who plays for Mutare City Rovers.
