= Shimeket Gugesa =

Ethiopian footballer

Shimeket Gugsa
Personal information
- Full name: Shimeket Gugsa Besha
- Date of birth: 1 January 1995 (age 31)
- Place of birth: Addis Ababa, Ethiopia
- Height: 1.78 m (5 ft 10 in)
- Position: Attacking midfielder

Team information
- Current team: Fasil Kenema
- Number: 19

Senior career*
Years	Team	Apps	(Gls)
2012–2013	Hawassa City		
2013–2018	Dedebit		
2018–	Fasil Kenema	92	(17)

International career^{‡}
2013–	Ethiopia	17	(0)
- * Club domestic league appearances and goals as of 21:47, 11 June 2023 (UTC) ‡ National team caps and goals as of 21:47, 23 December 2021 (UTC)

Shimeket Gugesa Beshah (Amharic: ሽመክት ጉግሳ; born 1 January 1995) is an Ethiopian professional footballer who plays as an attacking midfielder for Ethiopian Premier League club Fasil Kenema and the Ethiopia national team.

== Club career ==
Gugesa began his career with Hawassa City, before moving to Dedebit in 2013. In 2018, he transferred to Fasil Kenema, signing an extension with the club on 1 October 2020.

== International career ==
Gugesa made his international debut with the Ethiopia national team in a 0–0 tie with Kenya in the 2013 CECAFA Cup on 27 November 2013.

== Honours ==
Dedebit

- Ethiopian Cup: 2014

Fasil Kenema

- Ethiopian Premier League: 2020–21
