= Lema Mabidi =

Congolese footballer (born 1993)

Personal information
- Full name: Lema Chikito Mabidi
- Date of birth: 11 June 1993 (age 33)
- Place of birth: Kinshasa, Zaire
- Height: 1.79 m (5 ft 10 in)
- Position: Midfielder

Team information
- Current team: Vita Club
- Number: 35

Senior career*
Years	Team	Apps	(Gls)
2009–2013	Sharks XI	60	(25)
2013–2015	Vita Club	42	(8)
2015	CS Sfaxien	11	(0)
2015–2019	Raja Casablanca	91	(7)
2020	Sabail	6	(0)
2020–2021	Al-Quwa Al-Jawiya		
2021	→ Al-Diwaniyah		
2022–	Vita Club		

International career^{‡}
2014–	DR Congo	23	(0)
- * Club domestic league appearances and goals as of 21 August 2020 ‡ National team caps and goals as of 18:04, 1 July 2018 (UTC)

Lema Mabidi (born 11 June 1993) is a Congolese professional footballer who last played as a midfielder for Iraqi club Al-Diwaniya FC.

== Honours ==
AS Vita Club:

- CAF Champions League: Runner up 2014

Raja Casablanca

- Moroccan Throne Cup: 2017
- CAF Confederation Cup: 2018
- CAF Super Cup: 2019

=== National ===
DR Congo

- Africa Cup of Nations Third Place: 2015
