= Ndombe Mubele =

Congolese footballer

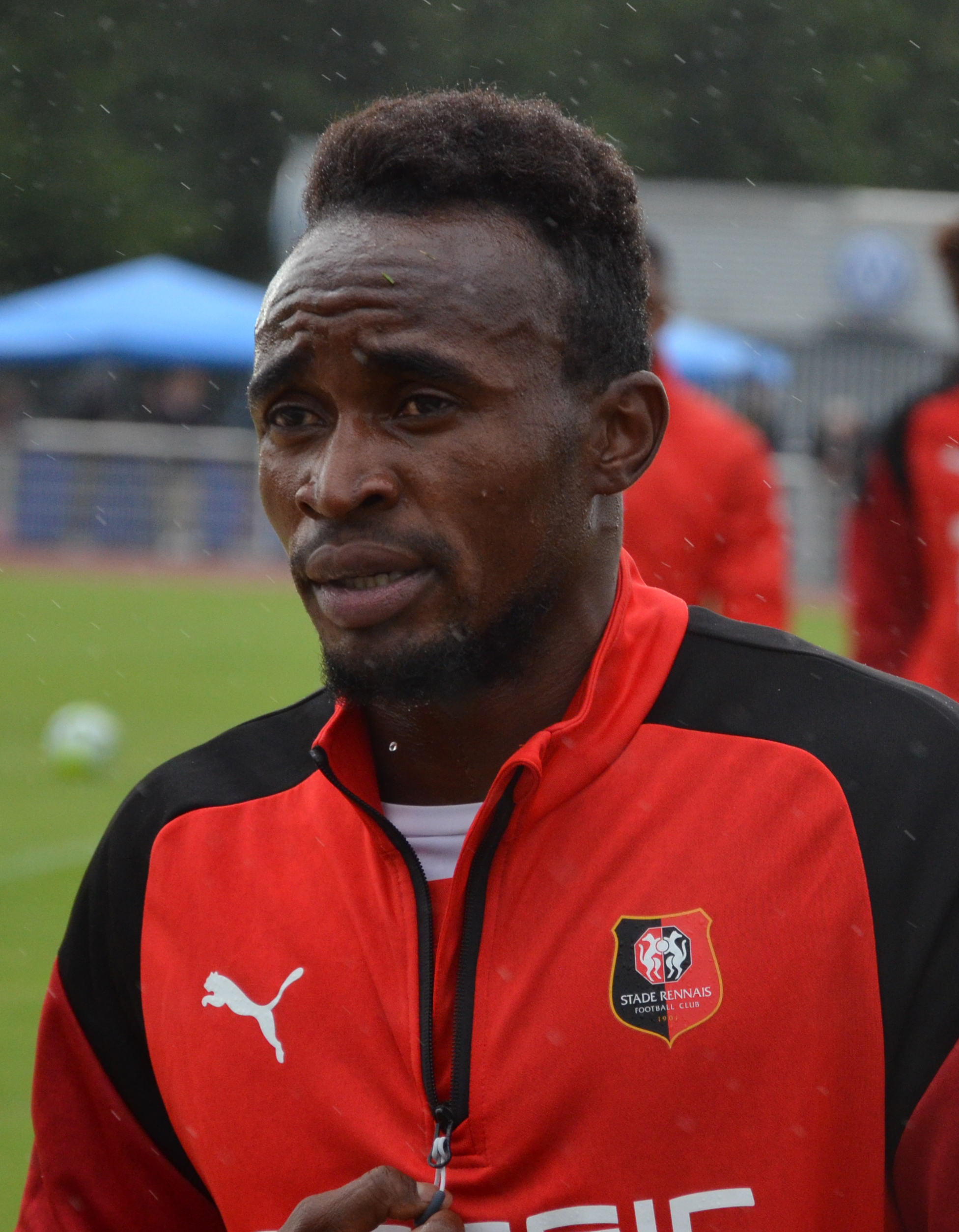
- Mubele in 2017

Personal information
- Full name: Firmin Ndombe Mubele
- Date of birth: 17 April 1994 (age 32)
- Place of birth: Kinshasa, Zaire
- Height: 1.78 m (5 ft 10 in)
- Positions: Winger; striker

Senior career*
Years	Team	Apps	(Gls)
2013–2015	Vita Club	123	(17)
2015–2017	Al Ahli	36	(16)
2017–2018	Rennes	34	(8)
2018	→ Toulouse (loan)	11	(1)
2018–2021	Toulouse	15	(1)
2018	Toulouse II	1	(0)
2019–2020	→ Astana (loan)	5	(1)
2022	1599 Șelimbăr	7	(3)
2024–2025	Blagnac	8	(0)

International career
2013	DR Congo U20		
2013–2018	DR Congo	44	(9)
- * Club domestic league appearances and goals as of 8 October 2025

Firmin Ndombe Mubele (born 17 April 1994) is a Congolese professional footballer who plays as a winger, while also being capable of filling the role of a striker. From 2013 to 2018 he represented the DR Congo national team at international level.

== Club career ==
In March 2013, Mubele scored a hat-trick for Vita Club in the 2014 CAF Champions League game against Kaizer Chiefs.

He joined Qatari club Al Ahli in July 2015.

He was transferred to Ligue 1 side Rennes on 30 January 2017.

On 2 July 2019, FC Astana announced the signing of Mubele on a one-year loan deal from Toulouse.

== International career ==
Mubele was called up for the under 20 age group 2013 Toulon Tournament.

Mubele made his international début for the Democratic Republic of the Congo in 2013. Mubele was involved in DR Congo's unsuccessful campaign to qualify for the 2014 FIFA World Cup, playing in games against Libya and Cameroon.

He was named in the 2014 African Nations Championship squad and played in four games.

== Career statistics ==
Scores and results list DR Congo's goal tally first, score column indicates score after each Mubele goal.

List of international goals scored by Ndombe Mubele
No.	Date	Venue	Opponent	Score	Result	Competition
1	26 August 2013	Roumdé Adjia Stadium, Garoua, Cameroon	Cameroon	1–0	1–0	2014 African Nations Championship qualification
2	10 September 2014	Stade TP Mazembe, Lubumbashi, DR Congo	Sierra Leone	1–0	2–0	2015 Africa Cup of Nations qualification
3	14 June 2015	Stade Tata Raphaël, Kinshasa, DR Congo	Madagascar	1–0	2–0	2017 Africa Cup of Nations qualification
4	12 November 2015	Prince Louis Rwagasore Stadium, Bujumbura, Burundi	Burundi	2–2	3–2	2018 FIFA World Cup qualification
5	12 November 2015	Prince Louis Rwagasore Stadium, Bujumbura, Burundi	Burundi	3–2	3–2	2018 FIFA World Cup qualification
6	4 September 2016	Stade des Martyrs, Kinshasa, DR Congo	Central African Republic	2–0	4–1	2017 AfricaCup of Nations qualification
7	8 October 2016	Stade des Martyrs, Kinshasa, DR Congo	Libya	4–0	4–0	2018 FIFA World Cup qualification
8	24 January 2017	Stade de Port-Gentil, Port-Gentil, Gabon	Togo	2–0	3–1	2017 Africa Cup of Nations
9	7 October 2017	Stade Mustapha Ben Jannet, Monastir, Tunisia	Libya	2–1	2–1	2018 FIFA World Cup qualification

== Honors ==
DR Congo

- Africa Cup of Nations bronze: 2015
