= Stade Tata Raphaël =

Multi-purpose stadium in Democratic Republic of the Congo

Coordinates: 4°20′17″S 15°19′20″E

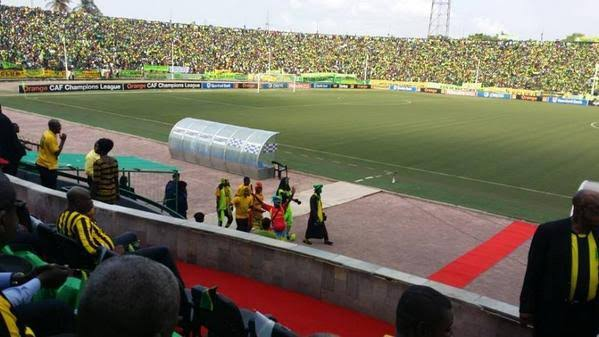
- Interactive map of Stade Tata Raphaël
- Former names: Stade Roi Baudouin (1952–1967); Stade du 20 Mai (1967–1997)
- Location: Kinshasa, Democratic Republic of the Congo
- Capacity: 60,000
- Surface: Synthetic lawn

Construction
- Opened: 1952

Tenants
- DC Motema Pembe; AS Vita Club

Stade Tata Raphaël (Father Raphael Stadium) is a multi-purpose stadium in Kinshasa, Democratic Republic of the Congo. Originally known as Stade Roi Baudouin (King Baudouin Stadium) when it was inaugurated in 1952 and Stade du 20 Mai (20 May Stadium) in 1967, it was used mostly for football matches. The stadium has a capacity of 60,000 people.

== History ==
The stadium's most famous event was The Rumble in the Jungle boxing match between George Foreman and Muhammad Ali for the undisputed WBC/WBA Heavyweight Championship that took place on October 30, 1974. Sixty thousand people attended the boxing match. In what was ranked as a great upset, Ali knocked out the undefeated Foreman in the eighth round. The associated music festival, Zaire 74, that took place at the stadium six weeks prior to the boxing match, included stars James Brown and B.B. King.

Following the downfall of President Mobutu Sese Seko's regime in 1997, the stadium was renamed Stade Tata Raphaël after Raphaël de la Kethulle de Ryhove, initiator of the stadium in 1952.

The stadium was the setting for a documentary film about Congolese women's boxing, Victoire Terminus (2008).

== In popular culture ==
- Barbara Kingsolver's novel The Poisonwood Bible (1998) includes a passage describing the Rumble in the Jungle taking place at the Stade du 20 Mai (20 May Stadium) while political prisoners are locked up downstairs.

== See also ==
- List of football stadiums in the Democratic Republic of the Congo
- Lists of stadiums
