= 2020 African Nations Championship qualification =

Tournament details
- Dates: 20 April – 20 October 2019
- Teams: 48 (from 1 confederation)

Tournament statistics
- Matches played: 64
- Goals scored: 146 (2.28 per match)
- Top scorer(s): (Uganda) Patrick Kaddu (Zimbabwe) Prince Dube (4 goals each)

The 2020 African Nations Championship qualification was a men's football competition which decided the participating teams of the 2020 African Nations Championship. Only national team players who were playing in their country's own domestic league were eligible to compete in the tournament.

A total of 16 teams qualified to play in the final tournament, including Cameroon which qualified automatically as hosts.

== Teams ==
Originally, a total of 47 (out of 54) CAF member national teams entered the qualifying rounds, split into zones according to their regional affiliations. The draw for the qualifying rounds was held on 30 January 2019 at the CAF headquarters in Cairo, Egypt. A re-draw of the Central Eastern Zone (CECAFA) was announced on 3 July 2019, after Ethiopia (original hosts) and Djibouti (originally banned) were included. A re-draw of the Central Zone (UNIFFAC) was also made, after Cameroon (new hosts) were excluded from qualifying. Therefore, a total of 48 (out of 53) teams CAF member national teams entered the qualifying rounds after the re-draws.

| Zone | Spots (total 16) | Teams entering qualification | Did not enter |
|---|---|---|---|
| Northern Zone (UNAF) | 2 spots | Algeria; **Libya**; **Morocco**; Tunisia | Egypt |
| Western Zone A (WAFU-UFOA A) | 2 spots | Cape Verde; **Guinea**; Guinea-Bissau; Liberia; **Mali**; Mauritania; Senegal | Gambia; Sierra Leone (suspended by FIFA) |
| Western Zone B (WAFU-UFOA B) | 3 spots | Benin; **Burkina Faso**; Ghana; Ivory Coast; **Niger**; Nigeria; **Togo** | |
| Central Zone (UNIFFAC) | 2 spots + **Cameroon** (hosts) | Central African Republic; Chad; **Congo**; **DR Congo**; Equatorial Guinea; São Tomé and Príncipe **(W)** | Gabon (banned) |
| Central Eastern Zone (CECAFA) | 3 spots | Burundi; Djibouti (originally banned); Ethiopia (original hosts); Kenya; **Rwanda**; Somalia; South Sudan; Sudan; **Tanzania**; **Uganda** | Eritrea |
| Southern Zone (COSAFA) | 3 spots | Angola; Botswana; Comoros; Eswatini; Lesotho; Madagascar; Malawi; Mauritius; Mozambique; **Namibia**; Seychelles; South Africa; **Zambia**; **Zimbabwe** | |

Notes

- Teams in **bold** qualified for the final tournament.
- Teams in italics received a bye to the second round in the qualifying draw.
- (W): Withdrew after draw

== Format ==
Qualification ties were played on a home-and-away two-legged basis. If the aggregate score was tied after the second leg, the away goals rule would be applied, and if still level, the penalty shoot-out would be used to determine the winner (no extra time would be played).

== Schedule ==
The schedule of the qualifying rounds was as follows.

| Zone / Round | | | Matchday | Date |
| Northern Zone | Western Zone A Western Zone B Central Zone Central Eastern Zone | Southern Zone | Matchday | Date |
|---|---|---|---|---|
| — | — | First round | First leg | 19–21 April 2019 |
| — | — | First round | Second leg | 10–12 May 2019 |
| — | First round | Second round | First leg | 26–28 July 2019 |
| — | First round | Second round | Second leg | 2–4 August 2019 |
| First round | Second round | Third round | First leg | 20–22 September 2019 |
| First round | Second round | Third round | Second leg | 18–20 October 2019 |

== Northern Zone ==
Winners qualified for 2020 African Nations Championship.

| Team 1 | Agg. | Team 2 | 1st leg | 2nd leg |
|---|---|---|---|---|
| Algeria | 0–3 | Morocco | 0–0 | 0–3 |
| Tunisia | 3–1 (Note: Tunisia withdrew after winning the tie, and Libya replaced them in the final tournament.) | Libya | 1–0 | 2–1 |

21 September 2019
19:45 UTC+1

| Algeria | 0–0 | Morocco |
|---|---|---|
| | Report |

Mustapha Tchaker Stadium, Blida
Referee: Joshua Bondo (Botswana)
19 October 2019
20:00 UTC+1

| Morocco | 3–0 | Algeria |
|---|---|---|
| Banoun 27' (pen.); Ahaddad 32'; Nahiri 41' | Report |

Stade Municipal, Berkane
Referee: Mahamadou Keita (Mali)

Morocco won 3–0 on aggregate.

21 September 2019
19:15 UTC+1

| Tunisia | 1–0 | Libya |
|---|---|---|
| Badri 55' | Report |

Stade Olympique, Rades
Referee: Abderrezak Arab (Algeria)
20 October 2019
17:00 UTC+1

| Libya | 1–2 | Tunisia |
|---|---|---|
| Moksi 70' (pen.) | Report | Badri 13', 89' |

Stade Boubker Ammar, Salé (Morocco) (Note: Libya played their home leg in Morocco due to the Libyan Civil War.)
Referee: Maudo Jallow (Gambia)

Tunisia won 3–1 on aggregate, but withdrew in January 2020. As a result, Libya qualified.

== Western Zone A ==
=== First round ===
| Team 1 | Agg. | Team 2 | 1st leg | 2nd leg |
|---|---|---|---|---|
| Guinea-Bissau | 0–7 | Mali | 0–4 | 0–3 |
| Cape Verde | 1–2 | Mauritania | 0–0 | 1–2 |
| Liberia | 1–3 | Senegal | 1–0 | 0–3 |

27 July 2019
16:30 UTC+0

| Guinea-Bissau | 0–4 | Mali |
|---|---|---|
| | Report | Koné 3', 38'; Samaké 56'; Doussé 71' |

Estádio Lino Correia, Bissau
Referee: Hassan Corneh (Liberia)
4 August 2019
16:00 UTC+0

| Mali | 3–0 | Guinea-Bissau |
|---|---|---|
| Koné 11'; Camara 29'; Traoré 89' | Report |

Stade Modibo Kéïta, Bamako
Referee: Bangaly Konate (Guinea)

Mali won 7–0 on aggregate.

27 July 2019
16:30 UTC−1

| Cape Verde | 0–0 | Mauritania |
|---|---|---|
| | Report |

Estádio Nacional de Cabo Verde, Praia
Referee: Bonifacio Julio da Silva (Guinea-Bissau)
3 August 2019
17:00 UTC+0

| Mauritania | 2–1 | Cape Verde |
|---|---|---|
| Touda 3', 68' | Report | Papalélé 90' |

Stade Olympique, Nouakchott
Referee: Adissa Abdul Raphiou Ligali (Benin)

Mauritania won 2–1 on aggregate.

28 July 2019
16:00 UTC+0

| Liberia | 1–0 | Senegal |
|---|---|---|
| Jackson 90' | Report |

Antoinette Tubman Stadium, Monrovia
Referee: Abdel Aziz Mohamed Bouh (Mauritania)
3 August 2019
17:00 UTC+0

| Senegal | 3–0 | Liberia |
|---|---|---|
| Diouf 50'; Niang 78'; Bâ 81' | Report |

Stade Léopold Sédar Senghor, Dakar
Referee: Fabrício Duarte (Cape Verde)

Senegal won 3–1 on aggregate.

=== Second round ===
Winners qualified for 2020 African Nations Championship.

| Team 1 | Agg. | Team 2 | 1st leg | 2nd leg |
|---|---|---|---|---|
| Mauritania | 0–2 | Mali | 0–0 | 0–2 |
| Senegal | 1–1 (1–3 p) | Guinea | 1–0 | 0–1 |

21 September 2019
17:00 UTC+0

| Mauritania | 0–0 | Mali |
|---|---|---|
| | Report |

Stade Olympique, Nouakchott
Referee: Slim Belkhaouas (Tunisia)
20 October 2019
16:00 UTC+0

| Mali | 2–0 | Mauritania |
|---|---|---|
| Coulibaly 42'; Sissoko 84' | Report |

Stade Modibo Kéïta, Bamako
Referee: Issa Sy (Senegal)

Mali won 2–0 on aggregate.

21 September 2019
16:30 UTC+0

| Senegal | 1–0 | Guinea |
|---|---|---|
| Mbodj 86' | Report |

Stade Léopold Sédar Senghor, Dakar
Referee: Jerry Yekeh (Liberia)
20 October 2019
16:00 UTC+0

| Guinea | 1–0 | Senegal |
|---|---|---|
| Bangoura 47' | Report |
Penalties
| | 3–1 |

Stade du 28 Septembre, Conakry

1–1 on aggregate. Guinea won 3–1 on penalties.

== Western Zone B ==
=== First round ===
| Team 1 | Agg. | Team 2 | 1st leg | 2nd leg |
|---|---|---|---|---|
| Benin | 0–1 | Togo | 0–0 | 0–1 |

28 July 2019
17:00 UTC+1

| Benin | 0–0 | Togo |
|---|---|---|
| | Report |

Stade Charles de Gaulle, Porto-Novo
Referee: Ibrahim Kalilou Traoré (Ivory Coast)
4 August 2019
16:00 UTC+0

| Togo | 1–0 | Benin |
|---|---|---|
| Tchakei 72' | Report |

Stade de Kégué, Lomé
Referee: Boureima Sanogo (Burkina Faso)

Togo won 1–0 on aggregate.

=== Second round ===
Winners qualified for 2020 African Nations Championship.

| Team 1 | Agg. | Team 2 | 1st leg | 2nd leg |
|---|---|---|---|---|
| Togo | 4–3 | Nigeria | 4–1 | 0–2 |
| Niger | 2–1 | Ivory Coast | 2–0 | 0–1 |
| Ghana | 0–1 | Burkina Faso | 0–1 | 0–0 |

22 September 2019
16:00 UTC+0

| Togo | 4–1 | Nigeria |
|---|---|---|
| Nane 16', 67'; Tchakei 75' (pen.); Agoro 90+2' | Report | Ibrahim 8' |

Stade de Kégué, Lomé
Referee: Adissa Ligali (Benin)
19 October 2019
16:00 UTC+1

| Nigeria | 2–0 | Togo |
|---|---|---|
| Alimi 9', 71' | Report |

Agege Stadium, Lagos
Referee: Abdoulaye Rhissa Al-Mustapha (Niger)

Togo won 4–3 on aggregate.

22 September 2019
16:00 UTC+1

| Niger | 2–0 | Ivory Coast |
|---|---|---|
| Halidou 43'; Abdoulaziz 65' (pen.) | Report |

Stade Général Seyni Kountché, Niamey
Referee: Adaari Abdul Latif (Ghana)
20 October 2019
15:00 UTC+0

| Ivory Coast | 1–0 | Niger |
|---|---|---|
| Bedi 47' | Report |

Stade Félix Houphouët-Boigny, Abidjan
Referee: Jean Ouattara (Burkina Faso)

Niger won 2–1 on aggregate.

22 September 2019
15:00 UTC+0

| Ghana | 0–1 | Burkina Faso |
|---|---|---|
| | Report | Pognongo 90+4' |

Baba Yara Stadium, Kumasi
Referee: Kouassi Attisso Attiogbe (Togo)
20 October 2019
16:00 UTC+0

| Burkina Faso | 0–0 | Ghana |
|---|---|---|
| | Report |

Stade du 4 Août, Ouagadougou
Referee: Joseph Odey Ogabor (Nigeria)

Burkina Faso won 1–0 on aggregate.

== Central Zone ==
Original draw (before Cameroon were excluded):

- First round: Central African Republic vs Chad.
- Second round: Winner 1 vs DR Congo, São Tomé and Príncipe vs Cameroon, Equatorial Guinea vs Congo.

=== First round ===
| Team 1 | Agg. | Team 2 | 1st leg | 2nd leg |
|---|---|---|---|---|
| Central African Republic | w/o | São Tomé and Príncipe | — | — |
| Chad | 4–5 | Equatorial Guinea | 3–3 | 1–2 |

30 July 2019
15:00 UTC+1

| Central African Republic | Cancelled | São Tomé and Príncipe |
|---|---|---|
| | Report |

Barthélemy Boganda Stadium, Bangui
Referee: Diosdado Nzibi Nze (Equatorial Guinea)
2 August 2019
--:-- UTC+0

| São Tomé and Príncipe | Cancelled | Central African Republic |
|---|---|---|
| | Report |

TBC
Referee: Jean-Piere Nguiene Bissila (Congo)

Central African Republic won on walkover after São Tomé and Príncipe withdrew.

28 July 2019
15:30 UTC+1

| Chad | 3–3 | Equatorial Guinea |
|---|---|---|
| Issa 17'; Adda 20'; Djimet 90' | Report | Nlavo 3'; Oba 22'; Efa 82' |

Stade Omnisports Idriss Mahamat Ouya, N'Djamena
Referee: André Kolissala (Central African Republic)
4 August 2019
18:00 UTC+1

| Equatorial Guinea | 2–1 | Chad |
|---|---|---|
| Celesdonio 2'; Nlavo 63' | Report | Adda 54' |

Estadio de Malabo, Malabo
Referee: Isidore Essono Nze (Gabon)

Equatorial Guinea won 5–4 on aggregate.

=== Second round ===
Winners qualified for 2020 African Nations Championship.

| Team 1 | Agg. | Team 2 | 1st leg | 2nd leg |
|---|---|---|---|---|
| Central African Republic | 1–6 | DR Congo | 0–2 | 1–4 |
| Equatorial Guinea | 2–3 | Congo | 2–2 | 0–1 |

22 September 2019
16:00 UTC+1

| Central African Republic | 0–2 | DR Congo |
|---|---|---|
| | Report | Beya 26'; Muleka 85' |

Barthélemy Boganda Stadium, Bangui
Referee: Diosdado Nzibi Nze Angono (Equatorial Guinea)
20 October 2019
15:30 UTC+1

| DR Congo | 4–1 | Central African Republic |
|---|---|---|
| Beya 13', 42'; Kikasa 28'; Muleka 60' | Report | Dimokoyen 70' |

Stade des Martyrs, Kinshasa
Referee: Antoine Effa Essouma (Cameroon)

DR Congo won 6–1 on aggregate.

22 September 2019
17:00 UTC+1

| Equatorial Guinea | 2–2 | Congo |
|---|---|---|
| Oba 11', 25' | Report | Etou 29'; Mokombo 83' |

Estadio de Malabo, Malabo
20 October 2019
16:00 UTC+1

| Congo | 1–0 | Equatorial Guinea |
|---|---|---|
| Bakoua 84' | Report |

Stade Alphonse Massemba-Débat, Brazzaville
Referee: Pierre Atcho (Gabon)

Congo won 3–2 on aggregate.

== Central Eastern Zone ==
Original draw (before Ethiopia and Djibouti were included):

- First round: Tanzania vs Sudan, Kenya vs Burundi, South Sudan vs Uganda, Somalia vs Rwanda.
- Second round: Winner 2 vs Winner 1, Winner 4 vs Winner 3.

=== First round ===
| Team 1 | Agg. | Team 2 | 1st leg | 2nd leg |
|---|---|---|---|---|
| Burundi | 4–1 | South Sudan | 2–0 | 2–1 |
| Somalia | 2–7 | Uganda | 1–3 | 1–4 |
| Djibouti | 3–5 | Ethiopia | 0–1 | 3–4 |
| Tanzania | 0–0 (4–1 p) | Kenya | 0–0 | 0–0 |

27 July 2019
15:00 UTC+2

| Burundi | 2–0 | South Sudan |
|---|---|---|
| Dusabe 63'; Nshimirimana 82' | Report |

Prince Louis Rwagasore Stadium, Bujumbura
Referee: Emmanuel Alphonce Mwandembwa (Tanzania)
4 August 2019
16:00 UTC+3

| South Sudan | 1–2 | Burundi |
|---|---|---|
| Kuch 1' | Report | Muselemu 67'; Dusabe 84' |

Phillip Omondi Stadium, Kampala (Uganda) (Note: South Sudan played their home leg in Uganda due to renovation of Juba Stadium.)
Referee: Saddam Houssein Mansour (Djibouti)

Burundi won 4–1 on aggregate.

27 July 2019
18:00 UTC+3

| Somalia | 1–3 | Uganda |
|---|---|---|
| Ahmed 87' | Report | Kaddu 45+3' (pen.); Kizza 63'; Lwanga 83' |

El Hadj Hassan Gouled Aptidon Stadium, Djibouti (Djibouti) (Note: Somalia played their home leg in Djibouti due to the Somali Civil War.)
Referee: Belay Tadesse (Ethiopia)
3 August 2019
16:00 UTC+3

| Uganda | 4–1 | Somalia |
|---|---|---|
| Kaddu 4' (pen.), 44' (pen.), 48'; Kyambadde 37' | Report | Tubal 88' |

Phillip Omondi Stadium, Kampala
Referee: Elsiddig Mohamed Eltreefe (Sudan)

Uganda won 7–2 on aggregate.

26 July 2019
18:00 UTC+3

| Djibouti | 0–1 | Ethiopia |
|---|---|---|
| | Report | Tamene 63' (pen.) |

El Hadj Hassan Gouled Aptidon Stadium, Djibouti
Referee: Abdoul Karim Twagiramukiza (Rwanda)
4 August 2019
16:00 UTC+3

| Ethiopia | 4–3 | Djibouti |
|---|---|---|
| Gebremichael 26'; Bayeh 43'; Giday 47'; Tafesse 88' | Report | Ahmed 40'; Robleh 52'; Mahabeh 58' |

Dire Dawa Stadium, Dire Dawa
Referee: Hassan Mohamed Hagi (Somalia)

Ethiopia won 5–3 on aggregate.

28 July 2019
16:00 UTC+3

| Tanzania | 0–0 | Kenya |
|---|---|---|
| | Report |

National Stadium, Dar es Salaam
Referee: Thierry Nkurunziza (Burundi)
4 August 2019
16:00 UTC+3

| Kenya | 0–0 | Tanzania |
|---|---|---|
| | Report |
Penalties
| Kibwage (penalty missed); Miheso (penalty scored); Onyango (penalty missed) | 1–4 | (penalty scored) Nyoni; (penalty scored) Godfrey; (penalty scored) Kamagi; (penalty scored) Hamisi |

Moi International Sports Centre, Kasarani
Referee: Brian Nsubuga Miiro (Uganda)

0–0 on aggregate. Tanzania won 4–1 on penalties.

=== Second round ===
Winners qualified for 2020 African Nations Championship.

| Team 1 | Agg. | Team 2 | 1st leg | 2nd leg |
|---|---|---|---|---|
| Burundi | 0–6 | Uganda | 0–3 | 0–3 |
| Ethiopia | 1–2 | Rwanda | 0–1 | 1–1 |
| Tanzania | 2–2 (a) | Sudan | 0–1 | 2–1 |

21 September 2019
15:00 UTC+2

| Burundi | 0–3 | Uganda |
|---|---|---|
| | Report | Ssekajugo 14'; Mutyaba 83'; Kizza 88' |

Prince Louis Rwagasore Stadium, Bujumbura
Referee: Souleiman Ahmed Djama (Djibouti)
19 October 2019
16:00 UTC+3

| Uganda | 3–0 | Burundi |
|---|---|---|
| Bayo 5'; Ssekajugo 70'; Okello 83' | Report |

Startimes Stadium, Kampala
Referee: Hassan Mohamed Hagi (Somalia)

Uganda won 6–0 on aggregate.

22 September 2019
16:00 UTC+3

| Ethiopia | 0–1 | Rwanda |
|---|---|---|
| | Report | Sugira 61' |

Tigray Stadium, Mekelle
Referee: Anthony Ogwayo (Kenya)
19 October 2019
15:30 UTC+2

| Rwanda | 1–1 | Ethiopia |
|---|---|---|
| Sugira 82' | Report | Tafesse 72' |

Stade Régional Nyamirambo, Kigali

Rwanda won 2–1 on aggregate.

22 September 2019
19:00 UTC+3

| Tanzania | 0–1 | Sudan |
|---|---|---|
| | Report | Mozamil 61' |

National Stadium, Dar es Salaam
Referee: Belay Tadesse (Ethiopia)
18 October 2019
19:00 UTC+2

| Sudan | 1–2 | Tanzania |
|---|---|---|
| Kamal 30' | Report | Nyoni 50'; Nchimbi 79' |

Al-Merrikh Stadium, Omdurman
Attendance: 25,000
Referee: Thierry Nkurunziza (Burundi)

2–2 on aggregate. Tanzania won on away goals.

== Southern Zone ==
=== First round ===
| Team 1 | Agg. | Team 2 | 1st leg | 2nd leg |
|---|---|---|---|---|
| Botswana | 5–1 | Seychelles | 2–0 | 3–1 |
| Eswatini | 1–1 (a) | Malawi | 0–0 | 1–1 |

20 April 2019
16:00 UTC+2

| Botswana | 2–0 | Seychelles |
|---|---|---|
| Ditlhokwe 58'; Boy 62' | Report |

Lobatse Stadium, Lobatse
Referee: Ishmael Chizinga (Malawi)
11 May 2019
16:30 UTC+4

| Seychelles | 1–3 | Botswana |
|---|---|---|
| Monnaie 62' | Report | Setsile 55', 87'; Mogorosi 71' |

Stade Linité, Victoria
Referee: Ganesh Chutooree (Mauritius)

Botswana won 5–1 on aggregate.

20 April 2019
15:00 UTC+2

| Eswatini | 0–0 | Malawi |
|---|---|---|
| | Report |

Mavuso Sports Centre, Manzini
Referee: Osiase Koto (Lesotho)
11 May 2019
14:30 UTC+2

| Malawi | 1–1 | Eswatini |
|---|---|---|
| Mhone 59' | Report | Gamedze 53' |

Kamuzu Stadium, Blantyre
Referee: Brighton Chimene (Zimbabwe)

1–1 on aggregate. Eswatini won on away goals.

=== Second round ===
| Team 1 | Agg. | Team 2 | 1st leg | 2nd leg |
|---|---|---|---|---|
| Botswana | 2–3 | Zambia | 0–0 | 2–3 |
| Eswatini | 2–2 (5–4 p) | Angola | 1–1 | 1–1 |
| Comoros | 0–2 | Namibia | 0–2 | 0–0 |
| Madagascar | 3–3 (a) | Mozambique | 1–0 | 2–3 |
| Lesotho | 6–2 | South Africa | 3–2 | 3–0 |
| Mauritius | 1–7 | Zimbabwe | 0–4 | 1–3 |

26 July 2019
19:00 UTC+2

| Botswana | 0–0 | Zambia |
|---|---|---|
| | Report |

Francistown Stadium, Francistown
Referee: Antonio Caluassi Dungula (Angola)
3 August 2019
15:00 UTC+2

| Zambia | 3–2 | Botswana |
|---|---|---|
| Chabula 13'; Kampamba 45+2'; Musakanya 67' | Report | Kebatho 10'; Boy 21' |

National Heroes Stadium, Lusaka
Referee: Celso Alvacao (Mozambique)

Zambia won 3–2 on aggregate.

28 July 2019
15:00 UTC+2

| Eswatini | 1–1 | Angola |
|---|---|---|
| Sithole 88' | Report | Manguxi 50' |

Mavuso Sports Centre, Manzini
Referee: Tirelo Mositwane (Botswana)
3 August 2019
20:30 UTC+1

| Angola | 1–1 | Eswatini |
|---|---|---|
| Caranga 34' | Report | Tsabedze 56' |
Penalties
| Caranga (penalty missed); De Paizo (penalty scored); Chico (penalty scored); Manguxi (penalty scored); Eddie (penalty missed); Coxe (penalty scored); Zé Panzo (penalty missed) | 4–5 | (penalty missed) Sithole; (penalty scored) M. Dlamini; (penalty scored) Shabangu; (penalty missed) #4; (penalty scored) Mkhonta; (penalty scored) Ndaba; (penalty scored) Vilakati |

Estádio dos Coqueiros
Referee: Nehemia Shoovaleka (Namibia)

2–2 on aggregate. Eswatini won 5–4 on penalties.

26 July 2019
15:00 UTC+3

| Comoros | 0–2 | Namibia |
|---|---|---|
| | Report | Kambindu 63'; Fredericks 89' |

Stade de Moroni, Moroni
Referee: Nelson Emile Fred (Seychelles)
4 August 2019
16:00 UTC+2

| Namibia | 0–0 | Comoros |
|---|---|---|
| | Report |

Sam Nujoma Stadium, Windhoek
Referee: Brighton Chimene (Zimbabwe)

Namibia won 2–0 on aggregate.

28 July 2019
14:30 UTC+3

| Madagascar | 1–0 | Mozambique |
|---|---|---|
| Randrianantenaina 90' | Report |

Mahamasina Municipal Stadium, Antananarivo
Referee: Ali Mohamed Adelaid (Comoros)
4 August 2019
15:00 UTC+2

| Mozambique | 3–2 | Madagascar |
|---|---|---|
| António 4'; Maninho 35'; Miquissone 43' | Report | Randrianantenaina 50'; Manampisoa 56' |

Estádio do Zimpeto, Maputo
Referee: Ganesh Chutooree (Mauritius)

3–3 on aggregate. Madagascar won on away goals.

28 July 2019
15:00 UTC+2

| Lesotho | 3–2 | South Africa |
|---|---|---|
| Seturumane 3'; Kalake 70' (pen.); Fothoane 88' | Report | Malepe 45' (pen.); Phewa 85' |

Setsoto Stadium, Maseru
Referee: Thulani Sibandze (Eswatini)
4 August 2019
15:00 UTC+2

| South Africa | 0–3 | Lesotho |
|---|---|---|
| | Report | Thaba-Ntšo 49', 69'; Kalake 90+2' |

Dobsonville Stadium, Johannesburg
Referee: Abdoul Ohabee Kanoso (Madagascar)

Lesotho won 6–2 on aggregate.

29 July 2019
12:00 UTC+4

| Mauritius | 0–4 | Zimbabwe |
|---|---|---|
| | Report | Masuku 19'; Mavunga 44', 87'; Tigere 68' |

Stade Auguste Vollaire, Flacq
Referee: Lebalang Martin Mokete (Lesotho)
4 August 2019
15:00 UTC+2

| Zimbabwe | 3–1 | Mauritius |
|---|---|---|
| Dube 15', 67', 83' | Report | A. Aristide 3' |

Barbourfields Stadium, Bulawayo
Referee: Audrick Nkole (Zambia)

Zimbabwe won 7–1 on aggregate.

=== Third round ===
Winners qualified for 2020 African Nations Championship.

| Team 1 | Agg. | Team 2 | 1st leg | 2nd leg |
|---|---|---|---|---|
| Eswatini | 2–3 | Zambia | 0–1 | 2–2 |
| Madagascar | 1–2 | Namibia | 1–0 | 0–2 |
| Zimbabwe | 3–1 | Lesotho | 3–1 | 0–0 |

22 September 2019
15:30 UTC+2

| Eswatini | 0–1 | Zambia |
|---|---|---|
| | Report | Shamende 80' |

Mavuso Sports Centre, Manzini
Referee: Dharamveer Hurbungs (Mauritius)
19 October 2019
15:00 UTC+2

| Zambia | 2–2 | Eswatini |
|---|---|---|
| Chabula 5', 57' | Report | P. Dlamini 60'; Matse 78' |

National Heroes Stadium, Lusaka
Referee: Nehemia Shoovaleka (Namibia)

Zambia won 3–2 on aggregate.

22 September 2019
14:30 UTC+3

| Madagascar | 1–0 | Namibia |
|---|---|---|
| Andrianirina 90+4' | Report |

Mahamasina Municipal Stadium, Antananarivo
Referee: Lebalang Mokete (Lesotho)
19 October 2019
15:00 UTC+2

| Namibia | 2–0 | Madagascar |
|---|---|---|
| Kambindu 22', 59' | Report |

Sam Nujoma Stadium, Windhoek
Referee: Thulani Sibandze (Eswatini)

Namibia won 2–1 on aggregate.

22 September 2019
15:00 UTC+2

| Zimbabwe | 3–1 | Lesotho |
|---|---|---|
| Dube 23'; Jaure 60'; Taderera 84' | Report | Kalake 90+3' (pen.) |

National Sports Stadium, Harare
Referee: Audrick Nkole (Zambia)
20 October 2019
15:00 UTC+2

| Lesotho | 0–0 | Zimbabwe |
|---|---|---|
| | Report |

Setsoto Stadium, Maseru
Referee: Egbert Yvon Havelock (Seychelles)

Zimbabwe won 3–1 on aggregate.

== Qualified teams ==
The following 16 teams qualified for the final tournament.

| Team | Qualifying zone | Qualified on | Previous appearances in African Nations Championship^{1} |
|---|---|---|---|
| Cameroon (hosts) | Central Zone | 13 April 2019 | 3 (2011, 2016, 2018) |
| Morocco | Northern Zone | 19 October 2019 | 3 (2014, 2016, 2018) |
| Libya | Northern Zone | 31 January 2020 | 3 (2009, 2014, 2018) |
| Mali | Western Zone A | 20 October 2019 | 3 (2011, 2014, 2016) |
| Guinea | Western Zone A | 20 October 2019 | 2 (2016, 2018) |
| Togo | Western Zone B | 19 October 2019 | 0 (debut) |
| Niger | Western Zone B | 20 October 2019 | 2 (2011, 2016) |
| Burkina Faso | Western Zone B | 20 October 2019 | 2 (2014, 2018) |
| DR Congo | Central Zone | 20 October 2019 | 4 (2009, 2011, 2014, 2016) |
| Congo | Central Zone | 20 October 2019 | 2 (2014, 2018) |
| Uganda | Central Eastern Zone | 19 October 2019 | 4 (2011, 2014, 2016, 2018) |
| Rwanda | Central Eastern Zone | 19 October 2019 | 3 (2011, 2016, 2018) |
| Tanzania | Central Eastern Zone | 18 October 2019 | 1 (2009) |
| Zambia | Southern Zone | 19 October 2019 | 3 (2009, 2016, 2018) |
| Namibia | Southern Zone | 19 October 2019 | 1 (2018) |
| Zimbabwe | Southern Zone | 20 October 2019 | 4 (2009, 2011, 2014, 2016) |

== Goalscorers ==
There were 146 goals scored in 64 matches, for an average of 2.28 goals per match.

4 goals

- (Uganda) Patrick Kaddu
- (Zimbabwe) Prince Dube

3 goals

- (Democratic Republic of the Congo) Joël Beya
- (Equatorial Guinea) Pedro Oba
- (Lesotho) Hlompho Kalake
- (Mali) Moussa Koné
- (Namibia) Elmo Kambindu
- (Tunisia) Anice Badri
- (Zambia) Emmanuel Chabula

2 goals

- (Botswana) Segolame Boy
- (Botswana) Thero Setsile
- (Burundi) Olivier Dusabe
- (Chad) Mahamat Adda
- (Democratic Republic of the Congo) Jackson Muleka
- (Equatorial Guinea) Luis Nlavo
- (Ethiopia) Mesfin Tafesse
- (Lesotho) Jane Thaba-Ntšo
- (Madagascar) Arnaud Randrianantenaina
- (Mauritania) Sidi Touda
- (Nigeria) Sikiru Alimi
- (Rwanda) Ernest Sugira
- (Togo) Richard Nane
- (Togo) Marouf Tchakei
- (Uganda) Mustafa Kizza
- (Uganda) Viane Ssekajugo
- (Zimbabwe) Leeroy Mavunga

1 goal

- (Angola) Caranga
- (Angola) Manguxi
- (Botswana) Thatayaone Ditlhokwe
- (Botswana) Omaatla Kebatho
- (Botswana) Joel Mogorosi
- (Burkina Faso) Stéphane Pognongo
- (Burundi) Iddy Muselemu
- (Burundi) Jospin Nshimirimana
- (Cape Verde) Papalélé
- (Central African Republic) Saint-Fort Dimokoyen
- (Chad) Abdelaziz Issa
- (Chad) Bechir Djimet
- (Republic of the Congo) Carof Bakoua
- (Republic of the Congo) Mignon Etou
- (Republic of the Congo) Yann Mokombo
- (Democratic Republic of the Congo) Merveille Kikasa
- (Djibouti) Youssouf Abdi Ahmed
- (Djibouti) Mahdi Houssein Mahabeh
- (Djibouti) Fouad Robleh
- (Equatorial Guinea) Celesdonio
- (Equatorial Guinea) José Ángel Efa
- (Eswatini) Phinda Dlamini
- (Eswatini) Sandile Gamedze
- (Eswatini) Sifiso Matse
- (Eswatini) Menzi Sithole
- (Eswatini) Fanelo Tsabedze
- (Ethiopia) Yared Bayeh
- (Ethiopia) Amanuel Gebremichael
- (Ethiopia) Adis Giday
- (Ethiopia) Aschalew Tamene
- (Guinea) Mamadouba Bangoura
- (Ivory Coast) Guy-Stéphane Bedi
- (Lesotho) Lehlohonolo Fothoane
- (Lesotho) Tsepo Seturumane
- (Liberia) Christopher Jackson
- (Libya) Ahmed Moksi
- (Madagascar) Théorodin Andrianirina
- (Madagascar) Lalaina Manampisoa
- (Malawi) Micium Mhone
- (Mali) Mohamed Camara
- (Mali) Mamadou Coulibaly
- (Mali) Kodjo Doussé
- (Mali) Issaka Samaké
- (Mali) Aly Desse Sissoko
- (Mali) Oumar Traoré
- (Mauritius) Andrew Aristide
- (Morocco) Hamid Ahaddad
- (Morocco) Badr Banoun
- (Morocco) Mohamed Nahiri
- (Mozambique) Dayo António
- (Mozambique) Maninho
- (Mozambique) Luís Miquissone
- (Namibia) Dynamo Fredericks
- (Niger) Ibrahim Abdoulaziz
- (Niger) Idrissa Halidou
- (Nigeria) Sunusi Ibrahim
- (Senegal) Abdoulaye Bâ
- (Senegal) Jean Diouf
- (Senegal) Assane Mbodj
- (Senegal) Ousseynou Niang
- (Seychelles) Perry Monnaie
- (Somalia) Farhan Mohamed Ahmed
- (Somalia) Daud Abdullahi Tubal
- (South Africa) Repo Malepe
- (South Africa) Luvuyo Phewa
- (South Sudan) Joseph Kuch
- (Sudan) Amir Kamal
- (Sudan) Yasir Mozamil
- (Tanzania) Erasto Nyoni
- (Tanzania) Ditram Nchimbi
- (Togo) Ashraf Agoro
- (Uganda) Fahad Bayo
- (Uganda) Allan Kyambadde
- (Uganda) Taddeo Lwanga
- (Uganda) Mike Mutyaba
- (Uganda) Allan Okello
- (Zambia) Kelvin Kampamba
- (Zambia) Bruce Musakanya
- (Zambia) Amity Shamende
- (Zimbabwe) Partson Jaure
- (Zimbabwe) Nqobizitha Masuku
- (Zimbabwe) Wellington Taderera
- (Zimbabwe) Never Tigere
