= 2019 COSAFA Cup =

Tournament details
- Host country: South Africa
- Dates: 25 May–8 June
- Teams: 13 (from 2 sub-confederations)
- Venue: 3 (in 3 host cities)

Final positions
- Champions: Zambia (5th title)
- Runners-up: Botswana
- Third place: Zimbabwe
- Fourth place: Lesotho

Tournament statistics
- Matches played: 20
- Goals scored: 48 (2.4 per match)
- Top scorer(s): (Malawi) Gabadinho Mhango (Malawi) Gerald Phiri Jr. (Mauritius) Ashley Nazira (3 goals each)

The 2019 COSAFA Cup was the 19th edition of the COSAFA Cup, an international football competition consisting of national teams of member nations of the Council of Southern Africa Football Associations (COSAFA).

The tournament was originally to be hosted in Zimbabwe but they withdrew in February 2019. In April 2019, Durban of South Africa was announced as the host city.

== Venues ==
Durban Stadiums
Umlazi	Stamford Hill	KwaMashu
King Zwelithini Stadium	Moses Mabhida Stadium	Princess Magogo Stadium
29.971°S 30.9°E	29.829°S 31.030°E	29.744°S 30.971°E
Capacity:10,000	Capacity:10,000	Capacity:12,000

== Match officials ==
Referees

- Celso Alvacao (Mozambique)
- Abdoul Kanoso (Madagascar)
- Nehemia Shoovaleka (Namibia)
- Eugene Salas Mdluli (South Africa)
- António Dungula (Angola)
- Audrick Nkole (Zambia)
- Lebalang Martin Mokete (Lesotho)
- Ganesh Chutooree (Mauritius)
- Brighton Chimene (Zimbabwe)
- Ali Mohamed Adelaid (Comoros)
- Brian Nsubuga Miiro (Uganda)

Assistant Referees

- James Emile (Seychelles)
- Lesupi Puputla (Lesotho)
- Athenkosi Ndongeni (South Africa)
- Mogomotsi Morakile (Botswana)
- Zamani Simelane (Swaziland)
- Nanga A Chalwe (Zambia)
- Luckson Mhara (Zimbabwe)
- Bajee Ram Babajee (Mauritius)
- Clemence Kanduku (Malawi)

== Group stage ==
=== Tiebreakers ===
The ranking of each team in each group was determined as follows:

1. Greatest number of points obtained in group matches
2. Goal difference in all group matches
3. Greatest number of goals scored in all group matches

=== Group A ===
Pos	Team	Pld	W	D	L	GF	GA	GD	Pts	Qualification
1	Comoros	2	1	1	0	4	3	+1	4	Quarter-finals
2	Eswatini	2	0	2	0	4	4	0	2	
3	Mauritius	2	0	1	1	3	4	−1	1	
4	Angola	0	0	0	0	0	0	0	0	Withdrew

Rules for classification: Group stage tiebreakers

25 May 2019
16:30 (UTC+2)

Eswatini	2–2	Mauritius
Mamba 30'; Badenhorst 73'	Report	Nazira 28', 69'

King Zwelithini Stadium, Umlazi
Referee: Celso Alvação (Mozambique)

27 May 2019
17:00 (UTC+2)

Eswatini	2–2	Comoros
Ndzinisa 25'; Badenhorst 50'	Report	Bacar 42'; I. Youssouf 52'

King Zwelithini Stadium, Umlazi
Referee: Ganesh Chutooree (Mauritius)

29 May 2019
17:30 (UTC+2)

Comoros	2–1	Mauritius
I. Youssouf 47'; I. Soulaimana 65'	Report	Nazira 53'

King Zwelithini Stadium, Umlazi
Referee: Eugene Salas Mdluli (South Africa)

=== Group B ===
Pos	Team	Pld	W	D	L	GF	GA	GD	Pts	Qualification
1	Malawi	3	2	1	0	6	2	+4	7	Quarter-finals
2	Namibia	3	2	0	1	6	3	+3	6	
3	Mozambique	3	0	2	1	2	3	−1	2	
4	Seychelles	3	0	1	2	0	6	−6	1	

Rules for classification: Group stage tiebreakers
26 May 2019
14:00 (UTC+2)

Mozambique	1–2	Namibia
Witi 77'	Report	Kamatuka 69'; Iimbondi 82'

King Zwelithini Stadium, Umlazi
Referee: Brighton Chimene (Zimbabwe)
26 May 2019
16:30 (UTC+2)

Malawi	3–0	Seychelles
Mhango 9'; Mbulu 49'; Phiri Jr. 85'	Report

King Zwelithini Stadium, Umlazi
Referee: Nehemia Shoovaleka (Namibia)

28 May 2019
15:00 (UTC+2)

Seychelles	0–0	Mozambique
	Report

King Zwelithini Stadium, Umlazi
Referee: Ali Mohamed Adelaid (Comoros)
28 May 2019
17:30 (UTC+2)

Namibia	1–2	Malawi
Hambira 16'	Report	Mhango 43'; Phiri Jr. 48' (pen.)

King Zwelithini Stadium, Umlazi
Referee: António Dungula (Angola)

30 May 2019
17:30 (UTC+2)

Mozambique	1–1	Malawi
Jeitoso 90+1'	Report	Kajoke 32'

King Zwelithini Stadium, Umlazi
Referee: Audrick Nkole (Zambia)
30 May 2019
17:30 (UTC+2)

Namibia	3–0	Seychelles
Gurirab 19', 26'; Urikhob 66'	Report

Princess Magogo Stadium, KwaMashu
Referee: Brian Nsubuga Miiro (Uganda)

== Knockout stage ==
Quarter-finals
Lesotho	0 (3)
Uganda	0 (2)
South Africa	2 (4)
Botswana	2 (5)
Zimbabwe	2
Comoros	0
Zambia	2 (4)
Malawi	2 (2)

Semi-finals
Lesotho	1
Botswana	2
Zimbabwe	0 (2)
Zambia	0 (4)

Final
Botswana	0
Zambia	1
Third place
Lesotho	2 (4)
Zimbabwe	2 (5)

=== Quarter-finals ===
1 June 2019
15:00 (UTC+2)

Lesotho	0–0	Uganda
	Report
Penalties
Koetle (penalty scored); Kalake (penalty scored); Motebang (penalty scored); Bereng (penalty missed)	3–2	(penalty missed) Kizza; (penalty scored) Mutyaba; (penalty missed) Revita; (penalty scored) Balinya; (penalty missed) Mucureezi

Princess Magogo Stadium, KwaMashu
Referee: Abdoul Kanoso (Madagascar)

1 June 2019
17:30 (UTC+2)

Zimbabwe	2–0	Comoros
E. Rusike 6'; Billiat 36'	Report

Princess Magogo Stadium, KwaMashu
Referee: Eugene Salas Mdluli (South Africa)

2 June 2019
15:00 (UTC+2)

South Africa	2–2	Botswana
Singh 19'; Margeman 28'	Report	Ditsele 61'; Ditlhokwe 90+3'
Penalties
Malepe (penalty scored); Mbule (penalty scored); Mukumela (penalty scored); Lepasa (penalty scored); Mokoena (penalty missed)	4–5	(penalty scored) Gaolaolwe; (penalty scored) Setsile; (penalty scored) Orebonye; (penalty scored) Boy; (penalty scored) Johnson

Princess Magogo Stadium, KwaMashu
Referee: Celso Alvação (Mozambique)

2 June 2019
17:30 (UTC+2)

Zambia	2–2	Malawi
Muwowo 58'; Chabula 89'	Report	Mhango 2'; Phiri Jr. 51' (pen.)
Penalties
Musakanya (penalty scored); Chama (penalty scored); Phiri (penalty scored); Chabula (penalty scored)	4–2	(penalty scored) Phiri Jr.; (penalty scored) Sanudi; (penalty missed) Kaonga; (penalty missed) Sambani

Princess Magogo Stadium, KwaMashu
Referee: Lebalang Martin Mokete (Lesotho)

=== Semi-finals ===
5 June 2019
17:00 (UTC+2)

Lesotho	1–2	Botswana
Motebang 79'	Report	Mogorosi 7'; Boy 32'

Moses Mabhida Stadium, Durban
Referee: Ganesh Chutooree (Mauritius)

5 June 2019
19:30 (UTC+2)

Zimbabwe	0–0	Zambia
	Report
Penalties
Billiat (penalty missed); Muskwe (penalty missed); Nakamba (penalty scored); Darikwa (penalty scored)	2–4	(penalty scored) Mwape; (penalty scored) Chirwa; (penalty scored) Phiri; (penalty scored) Musakanya

Moses Mabhida Stadium, Durban
Referee: Ali Mohamed Adelaid (Comoros)

=== Third-place playoff ===
7 June 2019
19:30 (UTC+2)

Lesotho	2–2	Zimbabwe
Thaba-Ntšo 33'; Bereng 68'	Report	T. Rusike 14'; Mavunga 61'
Penalties
Koetle (penalty scored); Kalake (penalty scored); Motebang (penalty scored); Bereng (penalty missed); Fothoane (penalty scored)	4–5	(penalty scored) T. Rusike; (penalty scored) Pfumbidzai; (penalty scored) Kutinyu; (penalty scored) Chinyengetere; (penalty scored) Dauda

Moses Mabhida Stadium, Durban
Referee: Celso Alvação (Mozambique)

=== Final ===
8 June 2019
15:00 (UTC+2)

Botswana	0–1	Zambia
	Report	Kaseba 78'

Moses Mabhida Stadium, Durban
Referee: Eugene Salas Mdluli (South Africa)

== Plate ==
Semi-finals
Uganda	1 (2)
South Africa	1 (4)
Comoros	1
Malawi	2

Final
South Africa	0 (5)
Malawi	0 (4)

=== Semi-finals ===
4 June 2019
17:00 (UTC+2)

Uganda	1–1	South Africa
Sserunkuma 46'	Report	Singh 70'
Penalties
Kizza (penalty missed); Mutyaba (penalty missed); Kagimu (penalty scored); Kasozi (penalty scored)	2–4	(penalty scored) Singh; (penalty scored) Links; (penalty scored) Mukumela; (penalty scored) Webber

Princess Magogo Stadium, KwaMashu
Referee: António Dungula (Angola)

4 June 2019
19:30 (UTC+2)

Comoros	1–2	Malawi
N. M'Changama 61'	Report	Mbulu 30'; Chirwa 90'

Princess Magogo Stadium, KwaMashu
Referee: Brian Nsubuga Miiro (Uganda)

=== Final ===
7 June 2019
17:00 (UTC+2)

South Africa	0–0 (a.e.t.)	Malawi
	Report
Penalties
Malepe (penalty scored); Links (penalty scored); Mukumela (penalty missed); Jordan (penalty scored); Dickens (penalty missed); Frosler (penalty scored); Mokoena (penalty scored)	5–4	(penalty scored) Mhango; (penalty scored) Sanudi; (penalty missed) J. Banda; (penalty missed) Mhone; (penalty scored) Mbulu; (penalty scored) Cholopi; (penalty missed) Petro

Moses Mabhida Stadium, Durban
Referee: Nehemia Shoovaleka (Namibia)
