= Fitsum =

Fitsum (Amharic: ፍጹም) is a unisex given name. Notable people with the name include:

- Fitsum Alemu (born 1995), Ethiopian football midfielder
- Fitsum Arega, Ethiopian ambassador to Canada
- Fitsum Assefa, Ethiopian teacher and politician
- Fitsum Zemichael, Eritrean singer
