= José Ángel (given name) =

José Ángel is a Spanish given name. Some people with the name:

== People ==
- José Ángel Galiñanes (1904–1973), Puerto Rican sports shooter
- José Ángel Espinoza (1919–2015), Mexican singer and actor
- José Ángel Casarrubias Salgado, Mexican criminal
- José Ángel Cuerda (born 1934), Spanish politician
- José Ángel Fernández Villa (born 1943), Spanish politician and trade unionist
- José Ángel García (1940–2021), Mexican actor and director
- José Ángel Gurría (born 1950), Mexican politician and diplomat
- José Ángel Egido (born 1951), Spanish actor
- José Ángel Córdova (born 1953), Mexican politician
- José Ángel González Sainz (born 1956), Spanish writer and academic
- José Ángel González Serna (born 1959), Mexican politician
- José Ángel César (born 1978), Cuban athlete
- José Ángel (footballer, born 1985), Spanish football defender
- José Ángel Gascón (born 1985), Spanish football midfielder
- José Ángel Antelo (born 1987), Spanish politician and basketball player
- José Ángel Crespo (born 1987), Spanish football centre-back
- José Ángel (footballer, born March 1989), Spanish football midfielder and centre-back
- José Ángel (footballer, born September 1989), Spanish football left-back
- José Ángel Bueno (born 1991), Spanish football attacking midfielder
- José Ángel (footballer, born 1992), Spanish football midfielder
- José Ángel Efa (born 1992), Equatoguinean football forward
- José Ángel Carrillo (born 1994), Spanish football forward
- José Ángel Coronel (born 1996), Mexican football forward

== See also ==
- José Ángel (disambiguation)
