= Abeso =

Abeso is a surname. Notable people with the surname include:

- Celesdonio Abeso (born 1998), Equatoguinean footballer
- Natalia Abeso (born 1986), Equatoguinean footballer
