= Asrat Haile =

Ethiopian football manager (1951/1952–2024)

Personal information
- Full name: Asrat Haile
- Date of birth: 1951 or 1952
- Date of death: October 2024 (aged 72)
- Place of death: Ethiopia

Managerial career
- Years: Team
- 2001: Ethiopia
- 05/2003 – 09/2003: Ethiopia
- 11/2004 – 12/2004: Ethiopia

Asrat Haile (1951 or 1952 – October 2024) was an Ethiopian football manager of the country's national team. He was frequently called upon by the Ethiopian Football Federation (EFF) as a temporary caretaker of the national team, affectionately known as the Walya Antelopes. He managed the team during at least three different time periods in 2001, 2003 and 2004.

== Career ==
Haile achieved regional success with the Ethiopia national team in the 2001 when he led his team to a win in the East and Central African Championship. Because of their success in 2001 with Asrat Haile at the helm, Ethiopia jumped 17 spots in FIFA rankings to 138th. However, the EFF chose to look for a new manager and signed German coach Jochen Figge in August 2002. Asrat remained as assistant coach. He began to loss of popularity among the fans during this time as he was blamed for the team's failures in 2002 under coach Figge; especially for their abysmal performance at 2002 CECAFA Cup in which the Walya Antelopes lost all four games in Group B.

In May 2003, Asrat was nonetheless re-appointed to the position interim head coach after the dismissal of Figge for allegedly failing to provide the proper documents for the position. In his second short tenure as manager, Ethiopia failed to qualify to the 2004 African Cup of Nations, extending to 22 years their streak of no appearances at the continental tournament.

In September 2003, Asrat was replaced by Seyoum Kebede as new permanent head coach. However, Seyoum's stay with the team was not much longer than Figge's.

In December 2004, Asrat was again appointed manager of the Walya Antelopes just two weeks before the 2004 CECAFA Cup. He led Ethiopia as they won the tournament for the second time under his stewardship and for the third time in Ethiopian football history. However, he announced immediately after the tournament that he would be resigning as coach. He said: "I wouldn't accept any contract offer from the EFF to coach the national [team]."

== Death ==
Haile died in October 2024, at the age of 72.
