= Emmanuel Chabula =

Zambian footballer (born 1998)

Personal information
- Date of birth: 10 January 1998 (age 28)
- Place of birth: Kitwe, Zambia
- Height: 1.71 m (5 ft 7 in)
- Position: Striker

Team information
- Current team: Green Buffaloes

Senior career*
Years	Team	Apps	(Gls)
2014–2015	Paramilitary Lusaka		
2016–2019	Kitwe United		
2019–2020	Nkwazi		
2020–2022	Lusaka Dynamos		
2022	Nkwazi		
2022–	Green Buffaloes		

International career^{‡}
2019–	Zambia	20	(10)
- * Club domestic league appearances and goals ‡ National team caps and goals as of 1 February 2021

Emmanuel Chabula (born 10 January 1998) is a Zambian footballer who plays as a forward for Green Buffaloes and the Zambia national team.

== International career ==
Chabula made his senior international debut on 2 June 2019 in a 4-2 penalty victory (2–2 after regulation) over Malawi, scoring his first senior international goal in the 89th minute of that match.

== Career statistics ==
=== International ===
Zambia national team
Year	Apps	Goals
2019	9	6
2020	7	3
2021	4	1
Total	20	10

==== International Goals ====
Scores and results list Zambia's goal tally first.

Goal	Date	Venue	Opponent	Score	Result	Competition
1.	2 June 2019	Princess Magogo Stadium, KwaMashu, South Africa	Malawi	2–2	2–2 (4–2 p)	2019 COSAFA Cup
2.	3 August 2019	National Heroes Stadium, Lusaka, Zambia	Botswana	1–1	3–2	2020 African Nations Championship qualification
3.	19 October 2019	National Heroes Stadium, Lusaka, Zambia	Eswatini	1–0	2–2	2020 African Nations Championship qualification
4.	19 October 2019	National Heroes Stadium, Lusaka, Zambia	Eswatini	2–0	2–2	2020 African Nations Championship qualification
5.	9 November 2019	Sam Nujoma Stadium, Windhoek, Namibia	Namibia	1–0	2–0	Friendly
6.	9 November 2019	Sam Nujoma Stadium, Windhoek, Namibia	Namibia	2–0	2–0	Friendly
7.	9 October 2020	Nyayo National Stadium, Nairobi, Kenya	Kenya	1–2	1–2	Friendly
8.	25 October 2020	Addis Ababa Stadium, Addis Ababa, Ethiopia	Ethiopia	1–0	3–1	Friendly
9.	25 October 2020	Addis Ababa Stadium, Addis Ababa, Ethiopia	Ethiopia	3–0	3–1	Friendly
10.	19 January 2021	Limbe Stadium, Limbe, Cameroon	Tanzania	2–0	2–0	2020 African Nations Championship

== Honours ==
=== International ===
Zambia

- COSAFA Cup: 2019
