= José Ángel =

José Ángel may refer to:

- José Ángel (given name)
- José Ángel (footballer, born 1985), Spanish football defender
- José Ángel (footballer, born March 1989), Spanish football midfielder and centre-back for Lee Man
- José Ángel (footballer, born September 1989), Spanish football left-back for Eibar
- José Ángel (footballer, born 1992), Spanish football midfielder for Cartagena
