= Mutyaba =

Mutyaba is a surname. Notable people with the surname include:

- Mike Mutyaba (born 1991), Ugandan footballer
- Muzamir Mutyaba (born 1993), Ugandan footballer
- Travis Mutyaba (born 2005), Ugandan footballer
