= 2020–21 Ethiopian Premier League =

75th season of top-tier Ethiopian football

Ethiopian Premier League
- Season: 2020–21
- Dates: 12 December 2020 – 28 May 2021
- Champions: Fasil City
- Relegated: None
- Top goalscorer: (Ethiopia) Abubeker Nassir (29 goals)

The 2020–21 Ethiopian Premier League was the 75th season of top-tier football in Ethiopia (22nd season as the Premier League). The season started on 12 December 2020. The first round of matches were held at Addis Abeba and Jimma Stadiums, while the second round of matches were held at Bahir Dar, Dire Dawa and Hawassa stadiums.

== League table ==
Pos	Team	Pld	W	D	L	GF	GA	GD	Pts	Qualification or relegation
1	Fasil City (C)	24	16	6	2	38	17	+21	54	Qualification for Champions League
2	Ethiopian Coffee (Q)	24	11	8	5	44	29	+15	41	Qualification for Confederation Cup
3	Saint George	24	11	7	6	37	26	+11	40	
4	Hadiya Hossana	24	10	8	6	26	19	+7	38	
5	Sebeta	24	9	10	5	28	26	+2	37	
6	Hawassa City	24	9	8	7	31	27	+4	35	
7	Bahir Dar City	24	8	9	7	27	23	+4	33	
8	Wolayta Dicha	24	9	6	9	31	29	+2	33	
9	Sidama Coffee	24	9	4	11	27	31	−4	31	
10	Dire Dawa City	24	7	7	10	24	31	−7	28	
11	Wolkite (R)	24	5	7	12	21	29	−8	22	Relegation to Ethiopian Super League
12	Jimma Aba Jifar (R)	24	2	9	13	19	42	−23	15	Relegation to Ethiopian Super League
13	Adama City (R)	24	3	5	16	18	42	−24	14	Relegation to Ethiopian Super League

Source: soccerethiopia.net
Rules for classification: 1) Points; 2) Goal difference; 3) Goals scored.
(C) Champions; (Q) Qualified for the phase indicated; (R) Relegated

== Top scorers ==
Rank	Player	Club	Goals
1	(Ethiopia) Abubeker Nassir	Ethiopian Coffee	29
2	(Ethiopia) Mujib Kassim	Fasil Kenema	20
3	(Ethiopia) Getaneh Kebede	Saint George	12
4	(Ethiopia) Sintayehu	Wolkite	11
5	(Ethiopia) Fitsum Alemu	Bahir Dar	10
5	(Ethiopia) Mesfin Tafesse	Hawassa	10
7	(Ethiopia) Abdisa Jemal	Adama	9
8	(Ethiopia) Muhdin Musa	Dire Dawa	8
8	(Ethiopia) Fitsum Tilahun	Sebeta	8
10	(Ethiopia) Temesgen Derese	Jimma Aba Jifar	7
