= Dennis Dauda =

Zimbabwean footballer

Personal information
- Date of birth: 15 April 1988 (age 38)
- Place of birth: Kwekwe, Zimbabwe
- Height: 1.90 m (6 ft 3 in)
- Position: Center-back

Team information
- Current team: CAPS United
- Number: 3

Senior career*
Years	Team	Apps	(Gls)
2011–2014	DSTV Rangers		
2014–2016	ZPC Kariba		
2016–2022	CAPS United		
2022-	Black Rhinos		

International career^{‡}
2017–	Zimbabwe	6	(0)
Medal record
Men's football
Representing Zimbabwe
COSAFA Cup
Third place	2019 South Africa
- * Club domestic league appearances and goals ‡ National team caps and goals as of 29 September 2019

Dennis Dauda (born 15 April 1989) is a Zimbabwean footballer who plays as a defender for CAPS United F.C. and the Zimbabwe national football team.

== Honours ==
Zimbabwe

- COSAFA Cup: 3rd place, 2019
