= Marouf Tchakei =

Togolese footballer

Personal information
- Date of birth: 15 December 1995 (age 30)
- Place of birth: Bassar, Togo
- Height: 1.67 m (5 ft 6 in)
- Position: Midfielder

Team information
- Current team: Singida Big Stars

Senior career*
Years	Team	Apps	(Gls)
2018–	ASKO Kara		

International career^{‡}
2019–	Togo	33	(3)
- * Club domestic league appearances and goals as of 22:37, 1 September 2021 (UTC) ‡ National team caps and goals as of 22:37, 21 June 2026 (UTC)

Marouf Tchakei (born 15 December 1995) is a Togolese footballer who plays as a midfielder for ASKO Kara and the Togo national team.

== International career ==
Tchakei made his debut with the Togo national team in a 0–0 2020 African Nations Championship qualification tie with Benin on 28 July 2019.

== Career statistics ==
=== International ===
Scores and results list Togo's goal tally first, score column indicates score after each Tchakei goal.

List of international goals scored by Marouf Tchakei
No.	Date	Venue	Opponent	Score	Result	Competition
1	4 August 2019	Stade de Kégué, Lomé, Togo	Benin	1–0	1–0	2020 African Nations Championship qualification
2	22 September 2019	Stade de Kégué, Lomé, Togo	Nigeria	3–1	4–1	2020 African Nations Championship qualification
3	26 March 2024	Père Jégo Stadium, Casablanca, Morocco	Libya	1–1	1–1	Friendly
