= Habtamu Tekeste =

Ethiopian footballer

Personal information
- Date of birth: 11 September 1998 (age 28)
- Place of birth: Hawassa, Ethiopia
- Position: Midfielder

Team information
- Current team: Fasil Kenema
- Number: 14

Senior career*
Years	Team	Apps	(Gls)
2020–	Fasil Kenema	47	(0)

International career^{‡}
2020–	Ethiopia	5	(0)
- * Club domestic league appearances and goals as of 21:47, 22 April 2023 (UTC) ‡ National team caps and goals as of 21:47, 23 December 2021 (UTC)

Habtamu Tekeste (Amharic: ሃብታሙ ተከስተ; born 11 September 1998) is an Ethiopian professional footballer who plays as a midfielder for Ethiopian Premier League club Fasil Kenema and the Ethiopia national team.

== International career ==
Tekeste made his international debut with the Ethiopia national team in a 2–3 friendly loss to Zambia on 22 October 2020.

== Honours ==
Fasil Kenema

- Ethiopian Premier League: 2020–21
