= Pedro Oba =

Equatoguinean footballer (born 2000)

Personal information
- Full name: Pedro Oba Asu Mbengono
- Date of birth: 18 May 2000 (age 26)
- Place of birth: Mongomo, Equatorial Guinea
- Height: 1.60 m (5 ft 3 in)
- Position: Forward

Team information
- Current team: Malabo United

Senior career*
Years	Team	Apps	(Gls)
–2017	Estrellas del Futuro de Mongomo		
2018	Deportivo Niefang		
2019–2023	Futuro Kings		
2023	Cano Sport		
2023–2024	Akonangui		
2024	15 de Agosto		
2024–2025	Loto-Popo		
2025–	Malabo United		

International career^{‡}
2017–	Equatorial Guinea	16	(5)
- * Club domestic league appearances and goals ‡ National team caps and goals as of 25 March 2024

Pedro Oba Asu Mbengono (born 18 May 2000) is an Equatoguinean footballer who plays as a forward for LIFGE club Malabo United and the Equatorial Guinea national team.

== International career ==
Oba was included in Rodolfo Bodipo's 23-men list for the 2018 African Nations Championship.

== Statistics ==
=== International ===
As of 25 March 2024

Equatorial Guinea
Year	Apps	Goals
2017	2	1
2018	3	0
2019	6	3
2022	3	1
2024	2	0
Total	16	5

=== International goals ===
Scores and results list Equatorial Guinea's goal tally first.

No.	Date	Venue	Opponent	Score	Result	Competition
1.	3 September 2017	Estadio de Malabo, Malabo, Equatorial Guinea	Benin	1–2	1–2	Friendly
2.	28 July 2019	Stade Nacional, N'Djamena, Chad	Chad	2–2	3–3	2020 African Nations Championship qualification
3.	22 September 2019	Estadio de Malabo, Malabo, Equatorial Guinea	Congo	1–0	2–2	2020 African Nations Championship qualification
4.	22 September 2019	Estadio de Malabo, Malabo, Equatorial Guinea	Congo	2–0	2–2	2020 African Nations Championship qualification
