= Moussa Koné (Malian footballer) =

Malian footballer

Personal information
- Date of birth: 19 December 1990 (age 35)
- Place of birth: Bamako, Mali
- Height: 1.74 m (5 ft 9 in)
- Position: Forward

Team information
- Current team: Real Bamako

Senior career*
Years	Team	Apps	(Gls)
–2014	Real Bamako		
2014–2015	MAS Fez		
2016–2017	Al-Oruba SC		
2017–2020	Stade Malien		
2021–	Real Bamako		

International career^{‡}
2017–	Mali	15	(0)
- * Club domestic league appearances and goals ‡ National team caps and goals as of 11:45, 9 July 2024 (UTC)

Moussa Koné (born 19 December 1990) is a Malian professional footballer who plays as a forward for Real Bamako.

== International career ==
=== International goals ===
Scores and results list Mali's goal tally first.

No.	Date	Venue	Opponent	Score	Result	Competition
1.	6 July 2013	Stade Modibo Kéïta, Bamako, Mali	Guinea	1–0	3–1	2014 African Nations Championship qualification
2.	27 July 2019	Estádio Lino Correia, Bissau, Guinea-Bissau	Guinea-Bissau	1–0	4–0	2020 African Nations Championship qualification
3.	27 July 2019	Estádio Lino Correia, Bissau, Guinea-Bissau	Guinea-Bissau	2–0	4–0	2020 African Nations Championship qualification
4.	4 August 2019	Stade Modibo Kéïta, Bamako, Mali	Guinea-Bissau	1–0	3–0	2020 African Nations Championship qualification
