= Klaus Ebbighausen =

German footballer and manager (born 1941)

Personal information
- Date of birth: 1941 (age 84–85)
- Place of birth: Osterode am Harz, Germany
- Position: Defender

Youth career
- Arminia Hannover
- Hannover 96

Senior career*
Years	Team	Apps	(Gls)
- Karlsruher SC
- FT Braunschweig
- Bayern Kickers Nürnberg

Managerial career
- 1976–1979: Sierra Leone
- 1980: Somalia
- 1987–1989: Ethiopia
- Long An
- Sudan U17
- * Club domestic league appearances and goals

Klaus Ebbighausen (born 1941) is a former German football manager.

== Playing career ==
Born in Osterode am Harz, Ebbighausen began his career at fellow Niedersachsen-based clubs Arminia Hannover and Hannover 96 as a youth player. Following his education, Ebbighausen played senior football for Karlsruher SC, FT Braunschweig and Bayern Kickers Nürnberg.

== Managerial career ==
Following his retirement, Ebbighausen moved into coaching. In 1976, he joined the Sierra Leone national football team as manager. Following his spell at Sierra Leone, Ebbighausen coached in Sudan, Nigeria and Pakistan. In 1980, Ebbighausen managed Somalia in their 1982 FIFA World Cup qualification attempts, exiting in the first round on away goals against Niger.

In 1982, Ebbighausen moved to Thailand, coaching the country's youth teams. In 1983, Ebbighausen moved to South Africa for three years in a scouting capacity. In 1987, Ebbighausen was appointed manager of Ethiopia. The country did not contest qualification for the 1990 FIFA World Cup during his tenure. Ebbighausen later coached in Malawi, Gambia and Laos. Ebbighausen helped Sudan's under-17's to qualify for the 1991 FIFA U-17 World Championship as well as managing Vietnamese club Long An. Ebbighausen worked as a youth coach in India and Bhutan, before his retirement in 2000.
