= Aly Desse Sissoko =

Malian footballer

Personal information
- Date of birth: 5 May 1998 (age 28)
- Place of birth: Bamako, Mali
- Height: 1.80 m (5 ft 11 in)
- Position: Midfielder

Senior career*
Years	Team	Apps	(Gls)
2013–2018	CO Bamako		
2018–2023	Stade Malien		
2023–2025	Olympique Béja	30	(1)
2025	Al-Batin	12	(0)
2025–2026	Olympique Akbou	7	(0)

International career^{‡}
2019–	Mali	3	(1)
- * Club domestic league appearances and goals as of 6 June 2026 ‡ National team caps and goals as of 00:11, 26 March 2021 (UTC)

Aly Desse Sissoko (born 5 May 1998) is a Malian footballer who plays as a midfielderthe Mali national team.

== International career ==
Diarra made his professional debut with the Mali national team in a 0–0 2020 African Nations Championship qualification tie with Mauritania on 21 September 2019.
