= Yared Bayeh =

Ethiopian footballer

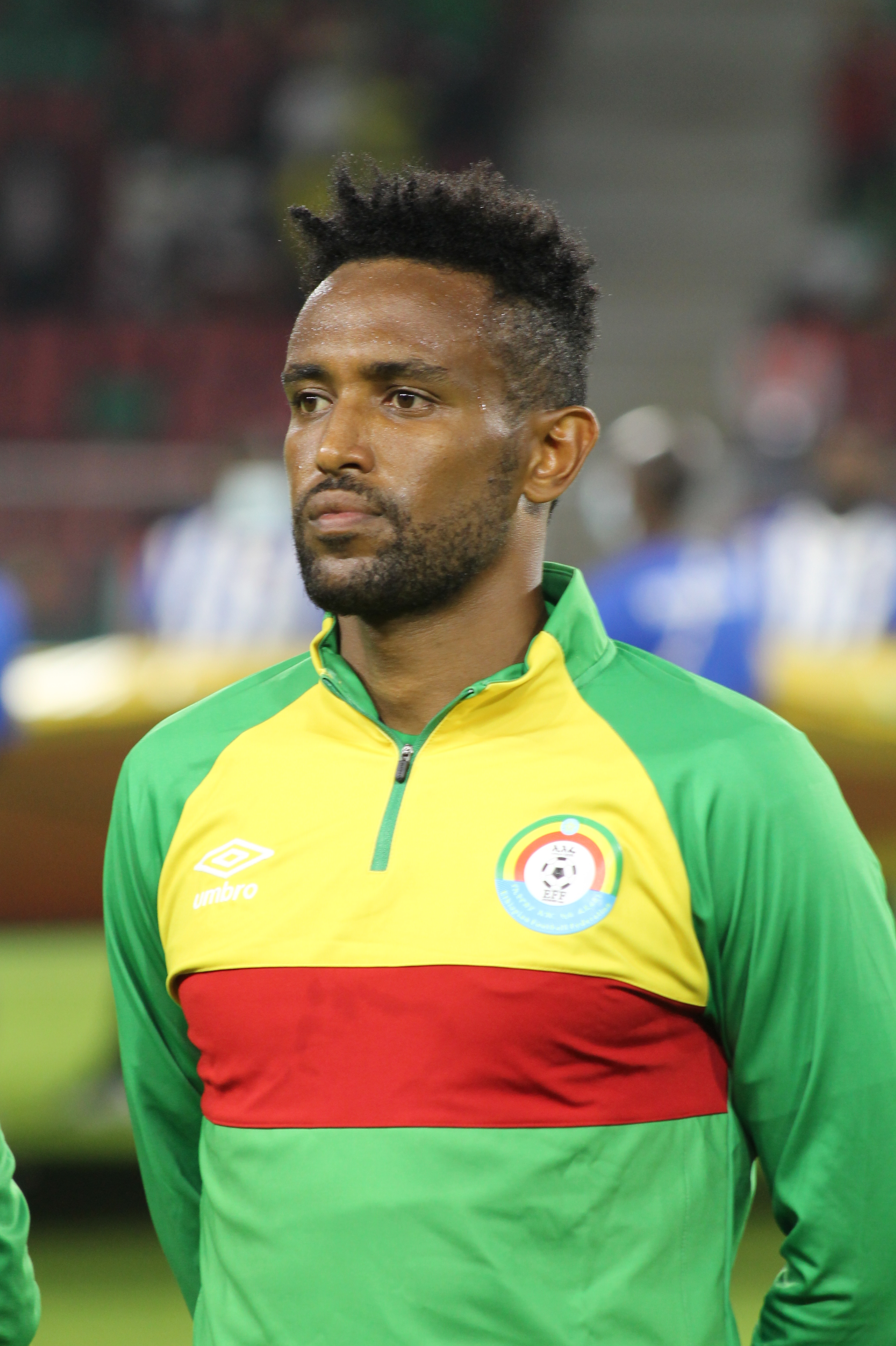
- Bayeh with Ethiopia at the 2021 Africa Cup of Nations

Personal information
- Full name: Yared Bayeh Belay
- Date of birth: 22 January 1995 (age 31)
- Place of birth: Bahir Dar, Ethiopia
- Height: 1.82 m (6 ft 0 in)
- Position: Centre-back

Team information
- Current team: Sidama Coffee
- Number: 16

Senior career*
Years	Team	Apps	(Gls)
2015–2016	Dashen Beer		
2016–2022	Fasil Kenema	59	(5)
2022–2024	Bahir Dar Kenema	46	(6)
2024–	Sidama Coffee	5	(1)

International career^{‡}
2015–	Ethiopia	58	(1)
- * Club domestic league appearances and goals as of 17:55, 16 November 2024 (UTC) ‡ National team caps and goals as of 00:10, 25 March 2024 (UTC)

Yared Bayeh Belay (Amharic: ያሬድ ባየህ በላይ; born 22 January 1995) is an Ethiopian professional footballer who plays as a centre-back for Sidama Coffee and the Ethiopia national team.

== Club career ==
=== Dashen Beer ===
Bayeh began his professional career with Dashen Beer and made his debut in the 2015–16 Ethiopian Premier League season.

=== Fasil Kenema ===
On 1 July 2016, Bayeh signed with Fasil Kenema. Later on, he won the 2020–21 Ethiopian Premier League with the club.

=== Bahir Dar Kenema ===
On 12 August 2022, Bayeh signed with his hometown club, Bahir Dar Kenema.

== International career ==
Bayeh made his international debut with the Ethiopia national team in a 1–0 2015 CECAFA Cup loss to Rwanda on 21 November 2015.

== Honours ==
Fasil Kenema

- Ethiopian Premier League: 2020–21
- Ethiopian Cup: 2019
- Ethiopian Super Cup: 2019
