= David Beshah =

Footballer (born 1987)

Personal information
- Full name: David Tamiru Beshah
- Date of birth: 20 July 1987 (age 39)
- Place of birth: Cologne, Germany
- Height: 1.76 m (5 ft 9 in)
- Position: Defensive midfielder

Youth career
- 1. FC Köln
- Alemannia Aachen
- Fortuna Köln
- Germania Dürwiß

Senior career*
Years	Team	Apps	(Gls)
2008–2009	Blau-Weiß Kerpen		
2009–2010	SC Brühl 06/45		
2010–2013	TSC Euskirchen		
2013–2015	Ethiopian Coffee		

International career
2014	Ethiopia	1	(0)
- * Club domestic league appearances and goals

David Tamiru Beshah (born 20 July 1987) is a former professional footballer who played as a defensive midfielder. Born in Germany, he made one appearance for the Ethiopia national team in 2014.

== Career ==
Beshah was born in Cologne, Germany. He played for 1. FC Köln, Alemannia Aachen, Fortuna Köln and Germania Dürwiß at youth level. At senior level, he featured for lower league clubs Blau-Weiß Kerpen, SC Brühl 06/45 and TSC Euskirchen.

In 2013 Beshah took part in a training camp of the Ethiopia national team for the Africa Cup of Nations but did not make the final squad for tournament. His performances at the camp caught the attention of scouts and he moved to Ethiopian Premier League club Ethiopian Coffee in the same year. He spent two years at Ethiopian Coffee before establishing a football consulting company in Addis Ababa.
