= Mesfin Tafesse =

Ethiopian footballer

Personal information
- Full name: Mesfin Tafesse Lemene
- Date of birth: 26 November 2001 (age 24)
- Place of birth: Hawassa, Ethiopia
- Height: 1.87 m (6 ft 2 in)
- Position: Striker

Team information
- Current team: Ethiopian Coffee
- Number: 17

Senior career*
Years	Team	Apps	(Gls)
2018–2022	Hawassa City		
2022–	Ethiopian Coffee	21	(5)

International career^{‡}
2019–	Ethiopia	16	(3)
- * Club domestic league appearances and goals as of 25 June 2023 ‡ National team caps and goals as of 00:13, 25 March 2024 (UTC)

Mesfin Tafesse Lemene (Amharic: መስፍን ታደሰ; born 26 November 2001) is an Ethiopian professional footballer who plays as a striker for Ethiopian Premier League club Ethiopian Coffee and the Ethiopia national team.

== Club career ==
Tafesse has played for Hawassa City of the Ethiopian Premier League since 2018.

== International career ==
Tafesse made his senior international debut on 8 August 2019 in a 2020 African Nations Championship qualification match against Djibouti. He scored his first international goal in the match, the eventual game-winner, after coming on as a second-half substitute.

=== International goals ===
Scores and results list Ethiopia's goal tally first.

No	Date	Venue	Opponent	Score	Result	Competition
1.	8 October 2019	Dire Dawa Stadium, Dire Dawa, Ethiopia	Djibouti	4–3	4–3	2020 African Nations Championship qualification
2.	19 October 2019	Nyamirambo Regional Stadium, Kigali, Rwanda	Rwanda	1–0	1–1	2020 African Nations Championship qualification
Last updated 12 October 2021

=== International career statistics ===
As of match played 9 October 2021

Ethiopia national team
Year	Apps	Goals
2019	7	2
2020	0	0
2021	1	0
Total	8	2
