= Tafadzwa Rusike =

Zimbabwean footballer (born 1989)

Personal information
- Full name: Tafadzwa Paul Rusike
- Date of birth: 7 May 1989 (age 37)
- Place of birth: Harare, Zimbabwe
- Height: 1.75 m (5 ft 9 in)
- Positions: Left winger; striker

Team information
- Current team: ZESCO United

Senior career*
Years	Team	Apps	(Gls)
2008–2010	CAPS United		
2010–2013	Ajax Cape Town	47	(2)
2014	Dynamos		
2015	Progresso Sambizanga		
2016–2017	CAPS United		
2017–2019	Zanaco		
2020–	ZESCO United		

International career
2009–2019	Zimbabwe	14	(1)
Medal record
Men's football
Representing Zimbabwe
COSAFA Cup
Third place	2019 South Africa
- * Club domestic league appearances and goals

Tafadzwa Rusike (born 7 May 1989 in Harare) is a Zimbabwean professional footballer, who plays as a winger for ZESCO United.

== Club career ==
=== CAPS United F.C. ===
Tafadzwa Rusike made his professional debut in the Zimbabwe Premier Soccer League for CAPS United F.C., signing with the club in January 2008, and finishing the 2007–08 season, Tafadzwa Rusike played for CAPS for the next two seasons, before transferring to the South African club Ajax Cape Town.

=== Ajax Cape Town ===
Tafadzwa Rusike made his professional debut in the South African PSL for Ajax Cape Town on 27 August 2010 in a 2–0 win against Bloemfontein Celtic at Green Point Stadium in Cape Town. He was acquired by Ajax Cape Town in the summer of 2010 as a transfer from Zimbabwean club CAPS United F.C. Rusike was joined at Ajax by CAPS club mate Khama Billiat, who had also transferred to the Cape club in the off-season. He played for three seasons with the team, and departed the Urban Warriors at the end of the 2012-13 season.

=== Dynamos ===
Tafadzwa Rusike has sign for Dynamos.

== International career ==
=== International goals ===
Scores and results list Zimbabwe's goal tally first.

No	Date	Venue	Opponent	Score	Result	Competition
1.	3 March 2010	National Sports Stadium, Harare, Zimbabwe	Malawi	2–1	2–1	Friendly
2.	7 June 2019	Moses Mabhida Stadium, Durban, South Africa	Lesotho	1–0	2–2 (5–4 p)	2019 COSAFA Cup

== Honours ==
Ajax Cape Town

- 2010 Telkom Knockout: Finalist

Zimbabwe

- COSAFA Cup: 3rd place, 2019
