= Fitsum Zemichael =

Eritrean singer (born 1971)

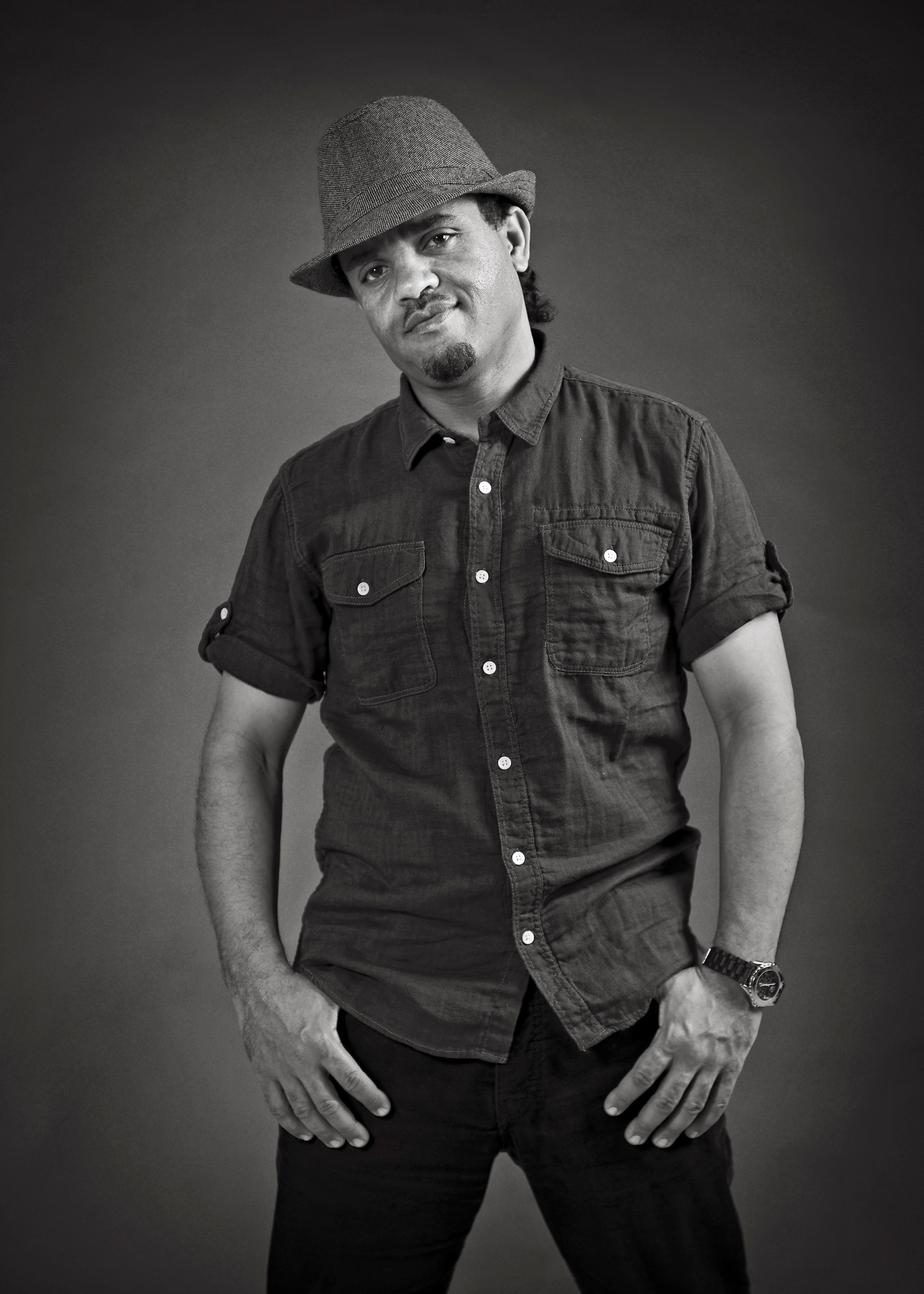
Fitsum Zemichael photograph in Norway

Fitsum Zemichael (Tigrinya: ፍጹም ዘሚካኤል; born 1971) is an Eritrean singer. He was born to Zemichael Mengistu and Abeba Abraha. He went to a local mission school, Lassalle Catholic College, for his primary education and later joined his elementary at Adventis school. Zemichael finished his secondary education at Gelawdiyos Secondary School in Adama, Ethiopia in 1990.

== Life and career ==
Zemichael started singing cover versions of songs by Bob Marley, Billy Ocean, Alpha Blondy, and Kool and the Gang in 1991 at the Zambos nightclub, in Addis Ababa, Ethiopia. He was best known as an English singer by most of the audience. He performed in the club with artists such as Hailiye Tadesse, Hileyessus Girma, Tamirat Ferenje and keyboardist Tsegachew Hayleyessus. After various shows with prominent singers, he recorded his first album, Lidya, in June 1994 in Addis Ababa. The album contained eight songs entirely composed by him. Zemichael is a singer, songwriter, composer, piano and drummer. He wrote many songs for different Tigrigna and Amharic artists, such as Abraham Gebremedhen, Alex Kahsay, Azalech Abate, Elsabeth Teshome, Habtom Gebremichael, Kahsay Berhe, Mahlet Gebregiorgis, Moges Mebrahtu, Shewandagen Hailu, Sofia Atsebha, Tirhas Tareke, Tadesse Abraha, Tesfay Gebreyohannes, Tikue Woldu, and Tsehaye Yohannes. He played with different local bands and performers including the Express Band, Mehari Brothers, Abegaz, Adulis Band and the Ras Dumera Band. He also performed with a Norway-based international performer, The Liberators. He was toured Europe and the Middle East.

Zemichael has recorded six albums to date, plus one single entitled "Kemdilayey" in co-operation with the Amharic singer, Anteneh Werash, a younger brother of Aregahagne Werash. He has sung in various languages including Tigrigna, Amharic, English and Spanish.

== Discography ==
Album name
Lydia
A'dyee
Girhinetey
New Generation
Aminey
