= Saint-Fort Dimokoyen =

Central African Republic footballer

Personal information
- Full name: Saint-Fort Flavien Dimokoye
- Date of birth: 7 August 1992 (age 34)
- Position: Midfielder

Senior career*
Years	Team	Apps	(Gls)
–2018	Olympic Real de Bangui		
2019–	Anges de Fatima		

International career^{‡}
2019–	Central African Republic	4	(1)
- * Club domestic league appearances and goals ‡ National team caps and goals as of 9 August 2020

Saint-Fort Dimokoyen (born 7 August 1992) is a Central African Republic football midfielder.

== International goals ==
Scores and results list Central African Republic's goal tally first.

No.	Date	Venue	Opponent	Score	Result	Competition
1.	20 October 2019	Stade des Martyrs, Kinshasa, DR Congo	DR Congo	1–4	1–4	2020 African Nations Championship qualification
