= Kodjo Doussé =

Malian footballer

Personal information
- Full name: Kodjo Doussé
- Date of birth: June 24, 1996 (age 30)
- Place of birth: Bamako, Mali
- Height: 1.86 m (6 ft 1 in)
- Position: Striker

Youth career
- JMG Academy Bamako

Senior career*
Years	Team	Apps	(Gls)
2014–2015	JMG Academy Bamako	–	(–)
2015–	Real Bamako	–	(–)
2017–2018	→ DRB Tadjenanet (loan)	26	(6)
2018	→ MC Oran (loan)	6	(0)

International career^{‡}
2017–	Mali	3	(1)
- * Club domestic league appearances and goals as of 28 December 2018 ‡ National team caps and goals as of 27 August 2019

Kodjo Doussé (born June 24, 1996, in Bamako) is a Malian footballer.

== International career ==
=== International goals ===
Scores and results list Mali's goal tally first.

No.	Date	Venue	Opponent	Score	Result	Competition
1.	27 July 2019	Estádio Lino Correia, Bissau, Guinea-Bissau	Guinea-Bissau	4–0	4–0	2020 African Nations Championship qualification
