= Luvuyo Phewa =

South African footballer

Personal information
- Full name: Luvuyo Howard Phewa
- Date of birth: 8 November 1999 (age 27)
- Height: 1.78 m (5 ft 10 in)
- Position: Midfielder

Team information
- Current team: AmaZulu
- Number: 30

Senior career*
Years	Team	Apps	(Gls)
2017–2020	Real Kings	33	(1)
2020–	Mamelodi Sundowns	0	(0)
2020–2021	→ Chippa United (loan)	7	(0)
2021–2022	→ University of Pretoria (loan)	27	(10)
2022–2024	→ Cape Town Spurs (loan)	28	(2)
2024–	→ AmaZulu (loan)		

International career^{‡}
2019–	South Africa U20	5	(0)
2019	South Africa	1	(1)
- * Club domestic league appearances and goals as of 17 November 2024 ‡ National team caps and goals as of 25 December 2023

Luvuyo Howard Phewa (born 8 November 1999) is a South African soccer player who currently plays as a midfielder for Cape Town Spurs.

He hails from Durban. In 2020, Phewa went from Real Kings to powerhouse Mamelodi Sundowns. Instead of playing matches for that club, he went on successive loans to Chippa United, University of Pretoria, Cape Town Spurs and in 2024 AmaZulu.

== Career statistics ==
=== International goals ===
Scores and results list South Africa's goal tally first.

No.	Date	Venue	Opponent	Score	Result	Competition
1.	28 July 2019	Setsoto Stadium, Maseru, Lesotho	Lesotho	2–2	2–3	2020 African Nations Championship qualification
