= Gofere Sportswear =

Ethiopian sportswear brand

Gofere Sports
- Industry: Textile
- Founded: 2016; 10 years ago
- Founder: Samuel Mekonnen and Hassen Mohammed
- Headquarters: Addis Ababa, Ethiopia
- Area served: Ethiopia, East Africa.
- Number of employees: 201-500

Gofere Sports is an Ethiopian-based sportswear brand. The company designs, manufactures, and markets sports apparel for professional and amateur sports clubs in Ethiopia and other East African nations.

== History ==
The company was founded in 2016 by Samuel Mekonnen and Hassen Mohammed. The company's products are worn by teams in the Ethiopian Premier League, as well as by amateur clubs and individual athletes.

On July 11, 2022, it partnered with Uganda Premier League side Modern F.C. for three years. The deal was announced and will see Gofere supply the Jinga-based side with 8 different outfits from the start of next season.

On September 2, 2022, Gofere signed a two-year sponsorship deal with BUL Football Club, a Ugandan Premier League club. The deal includes the manufacture and supply of training, playing, and travel kits for both players and technical teams.

On May 31, 2023 it signed a new deal with the Ethiopian Football Federation (EFF) to become the official kit supplier of the Ethiopian men's and women's national football teams. The deal, which is worth an undisclosed sum, will see Gofere supply matchday jerseys and training kits to the national teams for the next four months. Gofere will also have the right to use the Ethiopian Football Federation logo on its products. From May 2024 Gofere has struck and other important goal signed a supplier deal with the Federation of Uganda Basketball Associations (FUBA).
