= Leeroy Mavunga =

Zimbabwean footballer (born 1998)

Personal information
- Date of birth: 6 December 1998 (age 27)
- Place of birth: Zimbabwe
- Position: Left winger

Team information
- Current team: Dynamos F.C.

Senior career*
Years	Team	Apps	(Gls)
2016–2020	Yadah Stars F.C.		
2020-2021	CAPS United F.C.		
2021-2022	Orapa United F.C.		
2022-2024	Morupule Wanderers FC		
2024-2025	Scottland F.C.		
2025-Current	Dynamos F.C.		

International career^{‡}
2017–	Zimbabwe	7	(3)
Medal record
Men's football
Representing Zimbabwe
COSAFA Cup
Winner	2017 South Africa
Winner	2018 South Africa
Third place	2019 South Africa
- * Club domestic league appearances and goals as of 16 March 2019 ‡ National team caps and goals as of 29 July 2019

Leeroy Mavunga (born 6 December 1998) is a Zimbabwean professional footballer who plays as a Left winger for Dynamos F.C. and the Zimbabwe national football team.

== International career ==
=== International goals ===
Scores and results list Zimbabwe's goal tally first.

No.	Date	Venue	Opponent	Score	Result	Competition
1.	7 June 2019	Moses Mabhida Stadium, Durban, South Africa	Lesotho	2–1	2–2 (5–4 p)	2019 COSAFA Cup
2.	29 July 2019	Stade Auguste Vollaire, Centre de Flacq, Mauritius	Mauritius	2–0	4–0	2020 African Nations Championship qualification
3.	29 July 2019	Stade Auguste Vollaire, Centre de Flacq, Mauritius	Mauritius	4–0	4–0	2020 African Nations Championship qualification

== Honours ==
Zimbabwe

- COSAFA Cup: 2017, 2018; 3rd place, 2019
