= Mohamed Camara (footballer, born 1987) =

Malian footballer

Personal information
- Date of birth: 27 October 1987 (age 39)
- Place of birth: Bamako, Mali
- Position: Defender

Team information
- Current team: Real Bamako

Senior career*
Years	Team	Apps	(Gls)
2008–2009	Bakaridjan		
2009–	Real Bamako		

International career^{‡}
2014–	Mali	5	(1)
- * Club domestic league appearances and goals as of 00:11, 26 March 2021 (UTC) ‡ National team caps and goals as of 00:11, 26 March 2021 (UTC)

Mohamed Camara (born 27 October 1987) is a Malian footballer who plays as a defender for Real Bamako and the Mali national team.

== International career ==
Camara made his professional debut with the Mali national team in a 3–1 friendly win over China on 29 June 2014.
