= Mwila Phiri =

Zambian footballer (born 1994)

Personal information
- Date of birth: 29 August 1994 (age 32)
- Place of birth: Kabwe, Zambia
- Height: 1.80 m (5 ft 11 in)
- Position: Left-back

Team information
- Current team: ZESCO United F.C.
- Number: 26

Senior career*
Years	Team	Apps	(Gls)
2015–2018	Green Eagles F.C.		
2018	Lusaka Dynamos F.C.		
2018–	ZESCO United F.C.		

International career^{‡}
2015–	Zambia	12	(1)
- * Club domestic league appearances and goals ‡ National team caps and goals as of 1 April 2021

Mwila Phiri (born 29 August 1994) is a Zambian footballer who plays as a midfielder for ZESCO United F.C. and the Zambia national football team.

== Career ==
=== International ===
Phiri made his senior international debut on 7 November 2015, coming on as an 84th-minute substitute for Conlyde Luchanga in a 4-3 penalty defeat to Namibia. He notched his first international goal two months later, scoring the winner in a 2–1 victory over Angola.

== Career statistics ==
=== International ===
As of matches played 19 October 2019.

National team	Year	Apps	Goals
Zambia	2015	1	0
Zambia	2016	1	1
Zambia	2017	3	0
Zambia	2019	7	0
Total		12	1

==== International Goals ====
Scores and results list Zambia's goal tally first.

Goal	Date	Opponent	Score	Result	Competition
1.	10 January 2016	Angola	2–1	2–1	Friendly
