= Tshwarelo Bereng =

Mosotho footballer (born 1990)

Personal information
- Full name: Tshwarelo Mattwes Bereng
- Date of birth: 30 October 1990 (age 36)
- Height: 1.76 m (5 ft 9 1/2 in)
- Position: Attacking midfielder

Team information
- Current team: Hungry Lions

Senior career*
Years	Team	Apps	(Gls)
2012–2013	United	19	(6)
2013–2015	Moroka Swallows	19	(0)
2015–2016	Cape Town All Stars	20	(1)
2016–2017	Chippa United	15	(1)
2018–2020	Black Leopards	34	(3)
2020–2021	TS Sporting	2	(0)
2021–2022	Marumo Gallants	2	(0)
2022–2023	Mbabane Highlanders	0	(0)
2023–2025	Orbit College	0	(0)
2025–2026	Upington City	0	(0)
2026–	Hungry Lions	0	(0)

International career^{‡}
2018–	Lesotho	20	(1)
- * Club domestic league appearances and goals as of 13 March 2026 ‡ National team caps and goals as of 10 November 2022

Tshwarelo Mattwes Bereng (born 30 October 1990) is a Mosotho footballer who plays as an attacking midfielder for National First Division club Hungry Lions, and the Lesotho national football team.
