= Dire Dawa Stadium =

Stadium in Dire Dawa, Ethiopia

Coordinates: 9°34′55″N 41°51′29″E

- Interactive map of Dire Dawa Stadium
- Full name: Dire Dawa Stadium
- Location: Dire Dawa, Ethiopia
- Capacity: 25,000
- Surface: Artificial turf
- Field size: 102 × 64 m

Construction
- Opened: 1975
- Renovated: 2018–2024

Tenants
- Dire Dawa City SC; Ethiopia national football team (selected matches)

Dire Dawa Stadium is a multi-purpose stadium in Dire Dawa, Ethiopia. It is currently used mostly for football matches, on club level by Dire Dawa City of the Ethiopian Premier League. The stadium has a capacity of 25,000 spectators.

== History ==
The stadium hosted six matches during the 1976 African Cup of Nations hosted by Ethiopia.

In 2018, the stadium underwent renovation work after the conclusion of Dire Dawa City's 2017-18 season. The renovation included an overhaul of the main pitch surface. Starting on April 7, 2021, the stadium hosted the third round of matches of the 2020-21 Ethiopian Premier League.
