= Celesdonio Abeso =

Equatoguinean footballer (born 1998)

Celes Abeso
Personal information
- Full name: Celesdonio Abeso Oyono Mate
- Date of birth: 15 August 1998 (age 28)
- Place of birth: Bata, Equatorial Guinea
- Position: Forward

Team information
- Current team: Zuera

Youth career
- Cano Sport

Senior career*
Years	Team	Apps	(Gls)
2017	Cano Sport		
2017	Esmoriz	4	(0)
2018–2021	Cano Sport		
2021	Llanera	12	(0)
2022–2023	Gran Tarajal	44	(11)
2023–2024	Las Rozas	31	(1)
2024–	Zuera	0	(0)

International career^{‡}
2019	Equatorial Guinea U23	2	(0)
2018–	Equatorial Guinea	2	(1)
- * Club domestic league appearances and goals as of 25 May 2024. ‡ National team caps and goals as of 4 August 2019

Celesdonio Abeso Oyono Mate (born 15 August 1998) is an Equatoguinean footballer who plays as a forward for Tercera Federación club Zuera and the Equatorial Guinea national team.

== Club career ==
Celesdonio has played for Cano Sport Academy in Equatorial Guinea, for SC Esmoriz in Portugal and for Llanera in Spain.

== International career ==
Celesdonio made his international debut for Equatorial Guinea in 2018.

=== International goals ===
Scores and results list Equatorial Guinea's goal tally first.

No.	Date	Venue	Opponent	Score	Result	Competition
1.	4 August 2019	Estadio de Malabo, Malabo, Equatorial Guinea	Chad	1–0	2–1	2020 African Nations Championship qualification
