= Peter Cholopi =

Malawian footballer

Personal information
- Date of birth: 19 August 1996 (age 30)
- Place of birth: Blantyre, Malawi
- Height: 1.75 m (5 ft 9 in)
- Position: Centre-back

Team information
- Current team: Mighty Wanderers

Senior career*
Years	Team	Apps	(Gls)
2013–2014	Bvumbwe Research		
2015–2017	Mighty Tigers		
2018–	Mighty Wanderers		

International career^{‡}
2017–	Malawi	27	(0)
- * Club domestic league appearances and goals as of 21:36, 30 December 2021 (UTC) ‡ National team caps and goals as of 21:36, 30 December 2021 (UTC)

Peter Cholopi (born 19 August 1996) is a Malawian footballer who plays as a centre-back for Mighty Wanderers and the Malawi national team.
