= Mike Mutyaba =

Ugandan footballer (born 1991)

Personal information
- Full name: Mike Mutyaba
- Date of birth: 23 March 1991 (age 35)
- Place of birth: Kampala, Uganda
- Height: 1.66 m (5 ft 5 1/2 in)
- Position: Forward

Senior career*
Years	Team	Apps	(Gls)
2008–2011	Bunamwaya SC		
2011–2013	El-Merreikh		
2013–2014	TP Mazembe		
2014–	→ Vipers (loan)		
2014–2015	→ Express FC		
2015–2016	→ Vipers		
2016	→ Express FC		
2018–2020	KCCA FC		

International career^{‡}
2018	Uganda U23		
2011–	Uganda	5	(0)
- * Club domestic league appearances and goals as of 15 December 2015 ‡ National team caps and goals as of 1 January 2012

Mike Mutyaba also referred to as Sulaiman Mutyaba(born 23 March 1991) is a Ugandan retired professional footballer who played as a forward. He usually played as an attacking midfielder on the left however he had the ability to play effectively on the right or upfront.

== Club career ==
=== Bunamwaya SC ===
Mike Mutyaba joined the club strait from school having previously been an academy player for his local club Express FC and made his debut almost immediately.

=== El Merreikh ===
Mutyaba joins El Merreikh, In a related development, Mike Mutyaba has signed a two-year contract with Sudan giants El-Merreikh, two days after Bunamwaya SC teammate Owen Kasule joined Vietnamese side Hoang Ahn Gia Lai on another two-year deal.

"We can confirm that Mike Mutyaba has joined El-Merreikh and we have already released his International Transfer Certificate (ITC)," FUFA publicist Rogers Mulindwa told the press.

== International career ==
He was a part of Uganda U23 team. He made his debut for senior Uganda side in 2011.

=== International goals ===
Scores and results list Uganda's goal tally first.

No.	Date	Venue	Opponent	Score	Result	Competition
1.	21 September 2019	Prince Louis Rwagasore Stadium, Bujumbura, Burundi	Burundi	2–0	3–0	2020 African Nations Championship qualification
