= Paulo Godfrey =

Tanzanian footballer

Personal information
- Full name: Paulo Godfrey Nyanganya
- Position: Defender

Team information
- Current team: Young Africans
- Number: 26

Senior career*
Years	Team	Apps	(Gls)
2018–	Young Africans		

International career^{‡}
2019–	Tanzania	2	(0)
- * Club domestic league appearances and goals as of 1 August 2020 ‡ National team caps and goals as of 1 August 2020

Paulo Godfrey is a Tanzanian football defender who plays for Young Africans.
