= Mike Kibwage =

Kenyan footballer (born 1997)

Mike Evans Kibwage
Personal information
- Full name: Mike Evans Kibwage
- Date of birth: 1 October 1997 (age 29)
- Place of birth: Kenya
- Height: 1.82 m (6 ft 0 in)
- Position: Defender

Team information
- Current team: gormahia Football Club
- Number: 12

Youth career
- FISA Academy
- 2013-2016: Mukumu Boys High School
- 2016: Kakamega Homeboyz U20

Senior career*
Years	Team	Apps	(Gls)
2017-2018	A.F.C. Leopards	47	(1)
2019–	Kenya Commercial Bank S.C.	52	(2)

International career^{‡}
2018–	Kenya	14	(0)
- * Club domestic league appearances and goals ‡ National team caps and goals as of 18 January 2020

Mike Evans Kibwage (born 1 October 1997) is a Kenya footballer who plays as a defender for Kenya Commercial Bank S.C. and the Kenya national team. Mike a former student of Mukumu Boys High School (class of 2016), in Kakamega is considered one of the best center backs in east Africa with his composure on the ball and leadership skills unrivalled.

== Club career ==
Kibwage made his debut for Kenyan Premier League club AFC Leopards in 2017 in a match against Tusker F.C in 2017, he went on to make 47 appearances for the team and won the GOTV shield in 2017 with them. In 2018, Kibwage moved to KCB S.C and made his debut against Kakamega Homeboyz at Bukhungu stadium.

== International career ==
Kibwage made his debut for Kenya in 2018 against Swaziland. He has 14 caps for the national team.

== Career statistics ==
=== International ===
Statistics accurate as of match played 11 September 2018

Kenya national team
Year	Apps	Goals
Total	14	0

== Honours ==
- GoTV Shield: winner (2017 GoTv Shield,
