= Alex Kahsay =

Eritrean singer

- Born: Alex Kahsay
- Origin: Asmara, Eritrea
- Genre: Tigrinya music

Alex Kahsay is an Eritrean singer. He has released two solo albums, Abaditey and Ziyaday, in the Tigrinya language.

He was a member of Adulis Band with Kahsay Berhe and others. They were known for singing in Tigrinya, Amharic, and English.

== Discography ==
Albums

1. Abaditey
2. Embaba Ayney
3. Emuna
4. Lowo-nkulu
5. Kale aydelin
6. Qsenely
7. Seb
8. Tuemyu dehay
9. Ziyaday
10. Aminey
11. Kinaday Kinblo
12. Hadech
13. Tsinat Gebri
14. Tewerisu
15. N'Beyney
16. Mistir
17. Alku Bel
