= José Ángel Efa =

Equatoguinean footballer (born 1992)

José Ángel Efá
Personal information
- Full name: José Ángel Efá Nchama
- Date of birth: 29 January 1992 (age 34)
- Place of birth: Malabo, Equatorial Guinea
- Position: Forward

Team information
- Current team: Leones Vegetarianos

Senior career*
Years	Team	Apps	(Gls)
- Leones Vegetarianos

International career^{‡}
2019–	Equatorial Guinea	1	(1)
- * Club domestic league appearances and goals ‡ National team caps and goals as of 28 July 2019

José Ángel Efa Nchama (born 29 January 1992) is an Equatorial Guinean footballer who plays as a forward for Leones Vegetarianos and the Equatorial Guinea national team.

== International career ==
Efa made his international debut for Equatorial Guinea on 28 July 2019.

=== International goals ===
Scores and results list Equatorial Guinea's goal tally first.

No.	Date	Venue	Opponent	Score	Result	Competition
1.	28 July 2019	Stade Omnisports Idriss Mahamat Ouya, N'Djamena, Chad	Chad	2–3	3–3	2020 African Nations Championship qualification
