= Jochen Figge =

German football coach (born 1947)

Personal information
- Date of birth: 1947 (age 78–79)
- Place of birth: Germany

Managerial career
- Years: Team
- 1984: Nepal
- 1985: Saint Vincent and the Grenadines
- Guinea
- 1992–1993: Zambia
- 1996: Trinidad and Tobago
- 2002–2003: Ethiopia

Jochen Figge (born 1947) is a German professional football coach who has managed the national teams of a number of countries, including Nepal, Saint Vincent and the Grenadines, Guinea, Zambia, Trinidad and Tobago, and Ethiopia.
