= Fitsum Alemu =

Ethiopian footballer

Personal information
- Full name: Fitsum Alemu Fekir
- Date of birth: 15 July 1995 (age 31)
- Place of birth: Dessie, Ethiopia
- Height: 1.70 m (5 ft 7 in)
- Position: Attacking midfielder

Team information
- Current team: Bahir Dar Kenema
- Number: 14

Senior career*
Years	Team	Apps	(Gls)
2018–2019	Fasil Kenema		
2019–	Bahir Dar Kenema		

International career^{‡}
2019–	Ethiopia	4	(0)
- * Club domestic league appearances and goals as of 21:47, 23 December 2021 (UTC) ‡ National team caps and goals as of 21:47, 23 December 2021 (UTC)

Fitsum Alemu Fekir (Amharic: ፍፁም አለሙ; born 15 July 1995) is an Ethiopian professional footballer who plays as an attacking midfielder for Ethiopian Premier League club Bahir Dar Kenema and the Ethiopia national team.

== Club career ==
Born in Dessie, Ethiopia, Alemu began his senior career with Fasil Kenema before moving to Bahir Dar Kenema in 2019.

== International career ==
Alemu made his international debut with the Ethiopia national team in a 1–0 friendly loss to Uganda on 13 October 2019.
