= Micium Mhone =

Malawian footballer

Personal information
- Full name: Micium Mhone
- Date of birth: 19 January 1992 (age 34)
- Place of birth: Nkhata Bay, Malawi
- Height: 1.70 m (5 ft 7 in)
- Position: Attacking midfielder

Team information
- Current team: Blue Eagles

Senior career*
Years	Team	Apps	(Gls)
2011–2012	Nkhata Bay United		
2012–2015	Blue Eagles		
2015–2017	Jomo Cosmos	14	(1)
2017–	Blue Eagles		

International career^{‡}
2012–	Malawi	39	(3)
- * Club domestic league appearances and goals as of 01:29, 8 January 2022 (UTC) ‡ National team caps and goals as of 01:29, 8 January 2022 (UTC)

Micium Mhone (born 19 January 1992) is a Malawian footballer who plays as an attacking midfielder for Blue Eagles and the Malawi national team.

He represented Malawi at the 2021 Africa Cup of Nations.
