= José Ángel (footballer, born 1985) =

Spanish footballer

Personal information
- Full name: José Ángel Blanco Hevia
- Date of birth: 26 January 1985 (age 41)
- Place of birth: Oviedo, Spain
- Height: 1.82 m (5 ft 11 1/2 in)
- Position: Defender

Youth career
- Oviedo
- 2003–2004: Sporting Gijón

Senior career*
Years	Team	Apps	(Gls)
2004–2006	Sporting B	61	(4)
2006	Sporting Gijón	1	(0)
2006–2007	Puertollano	5	(0)
2007	Amurrio	14	(0)
2007–2008	Conquense	3	(0)
2008–2009	Avilés	35	(4)
2009–2015	Marino	110	(2)
- * Club domestic league appearances and goals as of 18 July 2020

José Ángel Blanco Hevia, simply known as José Ángel (born 26 January 1985), is a Spanish former professional footballer who played as a defender.

== Football career ==
Born in Oviedo, Asturias, José Ángel finished his graduation in neighbouring Sporting de Gijón's youth setup, and made his senior debuts in the 2004–05 season with the reserves in Tercera División. On 29 April 2006 he made his professional debut, playing the last 13 minutes in a 3–1 away success over Real Valladolid.

After being released by Sporting in the 2006 summer, José Ángel resumed his career in Segunda División B but also in the fourth level, representing CD Puertollano, Amurrio Club, UB Conquense, Real Avilés and Marino de Luanco. With the latter he achieved promotion to the third level at the end of the 2010–11 season, appearing in 24 matches during the campaign. He remained with the team until released, and retiring, after the club was demoted at the end of the 2014–15 season.
