= Hlompho Kalake =

Mosotho footballer (born 1994)

Personal information
- Date of birth: 2 September 1994 (age 32)
- Position: Midfielder

Team information
- Current team: Lioli
- Number: 7

Senior career*
Years	Team	Apps	(Gls)
2015–2025	Bantu	2	(1)
2025–	Lioli		

International career^{‡}
2015–	Lesotho	63	(11)
- * Club domestic league appearances and goals as of 10 September 2017. ‡ National team caps and goals as of 13 October 2025.

Hlompho Kalake (born 2 September 1994) is a Mosotho footballer who plays as a midfielder for Lesotho Premier League club Lioli FC and the Lesotho national team.
