= Ethiopia national football team =

Men's association football team

Ethiopia
- Nickname: ዋልያዎቹ (The Walia Ibex)
- Association: Ethiopian Football Federation (EFF)
- Confederation: CAF (Africa)
- Sub-confederation: CECAFA (East & Central Africa)
- Head coach: Yohannes Sahle
- Captain: Gatoch Panom
- Most caps: Shimelis Bekele (81)
- Top scorer: Getaneh Kebede (33)
- Home stadium: Various
- FIFA code: ETH
First colours	Second colours

FIFA ranking
- Current: 147 ▼4 (7 October 2026)
- Highest: 86 (September 2006)
- Lowest: 155 (December 2001)

First international
- French Somaliland 0–5 Ethiopia (French Somaliland; 5 December 1947)

Biggest win
- Ethiopia 10–2 French Somaliland (Addis Ababa, Ethiopia; 1 May 1954)

Biggest defeat
- Iraq 13–0 Ethiopia (Irbid, Jordan; 18 August 1992)

Africa Cup of Nations
- Appearances: 11 (first in 1957)
- Best result: Champions (1962)

African Nations Championship
- Appearances: 3 (first in 2014)
- Best result: Group stage (2014, 2016, 2022)
Medal record
Africa Cup of Nations
Gold medal – first place	1962 Ethiopia
Silver medal – second place	1957 Sudan
Bronze medal – third place	1959 United Arab Republic

The Ethiopia national football team (Amharic: የአትዮጵያ ብሔራዊ እግር ኳስ ቡድን), nicknamed Walia, after the Walia ibex, represents Ethiopia in men's international football and is controlled by the Ethiopian Football Federation, the governing body for football in Ethiopia. The team has been representing Ethiopia in regional, continental, and international competitions since its founding in 1943. The Walias play their home games at Addis Ababa Stadium located in the capital city of Addis Ababa. They are currently ranked 144th in the world according to the FIFA World Rankings and 44th in CAF.

Ethiopia was one of only three teams (along with Egypt and Sudan) to participate in the inaugural Africa Cup of Nations in 1957. It won the competition in 1962, while it was also the host. However, success has been elusive since the end of the 1960s. Under coach Sewnet Bishaw, the team qualified for the 2013 Africa Cup of Nations after a 31-year absence.

== History ==
=== Early history ===
Ethiopia has a long football tradition and was among the pioneers of international competition in Africa, playing its first international match in 1947, defeating French Somaliland 5–0. The EFF joined FIFA in 1952, and was one of the founders of the Confederation of African Football in 1957. The team took part in the inaugural African Nations Cup in 1957, where it finished second. In 1959, Ethiopia entered the 1962 World Cup qualifiers for the first time and faced Israel in the second round after a bye. The team lost both games; and with an aggregate score of 2–4 was knocked out of the competition.

The team won the African tournament on home soil, in 1962. Nine countries entered the competition, including the reigning champions, the United Arab Republic, meaning for the first time a qualification tournament was required. As with previous tournaments, the finals only included four teams. The United Arab Republic, as holders, and Ethiopia as hosts, qualified automatically meaning each needed to play only one game to reach the final. Ethiopia won the tournament for the first time after extra time in the final against the United Arab Republic. Mengistu Worku and Badawi Abdel Fattah were joint top-scorers, both with three goals each, but the award itself was given to Worku because his team had won the title. This was the greatest feat ever achieved by the Ethiopian National team, and the only African Cup of Nations title it has ever won. Luciano Vassalo was the team's captain, and the coach was Ydnekatchew Tessema.

In the 1963 African Cup of Nations, they finished fourth, after losing the third place battle against the United Arab Republic. The 1965 edition was even more of a disappointment for Ethiopia, as the national team was eliminated in group phase by Tunisia and Senegal, finishing at the bottom of the group, with only one scored goal.

The next African Cup of Nations was the 1968 edition. Again, but this time on home soil, the team finished in fourth place after losing to the Democratic Republic of the Congo in the semi-finals, and losing the third place match to Ivory Coast 0–1. But two years later, the team went through a real disaster, as they finished at the bottom of the group phase, with a goal difference of 3–12. The worst was yet to come for Ethiopia as they did not qualify for the 1972 African Cup of Nations at all, losing to Kenya in the qualifying tournament with a 0–3 aggregate. Almost the same thing happened for the 1974 African Cup of Nations. This time, they were eliminated by Tanzania.

Ethiopia hosted the Nations Cup tournament in 1976, but failed to progress to the final four, finishing third in the group, behind Guinea and Egypt. In 1977, they played Mauritius in the qualifiers for the 1978 African Cup of Nations. After a 4–2 win on aggregate, they had to play Uganda. After a 0–0 draw from the first match, Uganda won the second match, 2–1, and progressed to the final tournament. They also missed the 1980 African Cup of Nations. Until 2013, Ethiopia last qualified for the tournament in 1982, under coach Mengistu Worku, legendary former player. They failed to make it past the group stage.

=== Later history (2000–2011) ===
==== Earlier success in CECAFA Cup (2001–2007) ====
In the 2001 CECAFA Cup, Ethiopia beat Zanzibar 5–0 and tied 1–1 with Rwanda B to advance to the quarterfinals against Burundi. After a 2–2 tie in regulation, they beat Burundi 5–4 in penalty kicks. Ethiopia went on to beat Rwanda A 1–0 in the semi-finals and Kenya 2–1 in the finals to win the championship for the first time since 1987. Because of their success in 2001 with Asrat Haile at the helm, Ethiopia jumped 17 spots in FIFA rankings from 155th to 138th. Despite their success, the EFF chose to replace Asrat with German coach Jochen Figge in August 2002.

In the 2002 CECAFA Cup, Ethiopia failed to qualify past the group stage of the competition; they lost all four of their games against Zanzibar, Uganda, Somalia, and Rwanda. In 2003 CECAFA Cup, Ethiopia withdrew just before the start of the tournament. The competition only had six participating countries with Burundi, Djibouti, Somalia, and Tanzania also choosing not to participate. The EFF fired Figge in May 2003, even though the team had won two games and was second in their group in the 2004 African Cup of Nations qualifiers. Then assistant coach, Asrat was appointed interim coach. Ethiopia failed to qualify by 3 points with a loss in the final game in Guinea. Asrat was soon replaced by Seyoum Kebede whose tenure with the "Walias" was also short lived.

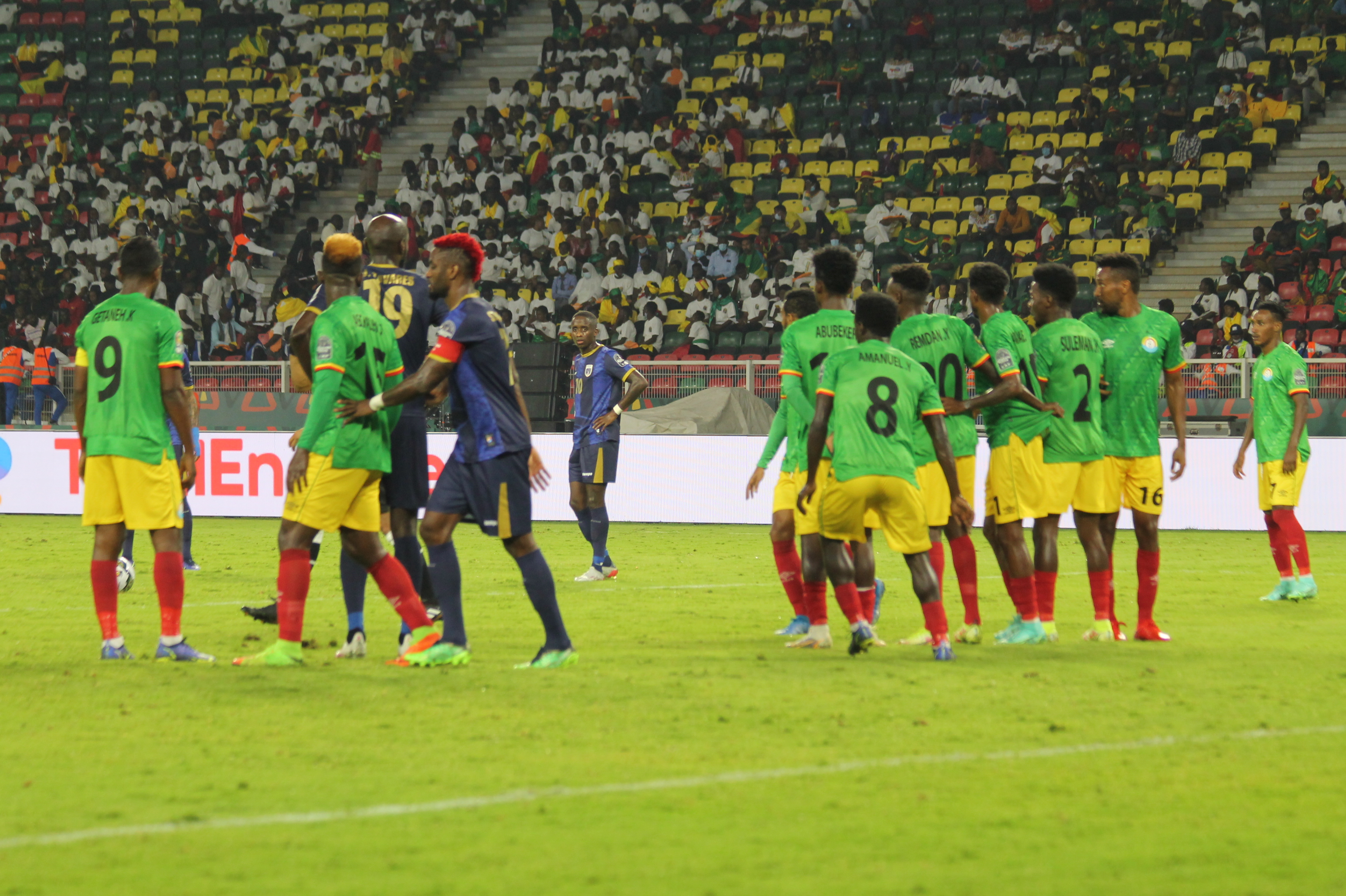
Ethiopia at the 2021 Africa Cup of Nations

The next challenge was the 2004 CECAFA Cup in Addis Ababa. There were 9 teams in regional tournament: Burundi, Zanzibar, Rwanda, Ethiopia, Tanzania, Sudan, Kenya, Uganda and Somalia. Ethiopia was led by captain Zewdu Bekele, and again by coach Asrat who was recalled to the position a mere two weeks before the beginning of the tournament. After defeating Burundi, tying with Rwanda and beating Tanzania, and Zanzibar, the team advanced to the semi-finals for the first time since 2001. Ethiopia advanced to the championship after a dramatic nail-biting penalty shootout with Kenya. The team went on to beat Burundi 3–0 and win the 2004 CECAFA Cup on 25 December 2004. That night, people all across Addis Ababa sang and danced in the streets.

The Ethiopian national team was the champion of the same CECAFA Cup competition again in 2005, in Kigali, Rwanda. This time coached by Sewnet Bishaw—after a 0–0 draw with Uganda and a 3–1 victory over Sudan—Ethiopia thrashed Djibouti in a 6–0 victory. They then went on to beat Somalia 3–1. Semi-finals saw Ethiopia whip Zanzibar 4–0, with Fikru Tefera scoring a hat-trick. In the final match, Andualem Negusse's goal allowed Ethiopia to take the cup again with a 1–0 win over Rwanda.

The Ethiopian team did not fare as well in the next three appearances at the CECAFA Cup. At the 2006 CECAFA Cup in Addis Ababa, Ethiopia lost to Tanzania but beat Djibouti and Malawi in the group stage to advance to the quarterfinals against Zambia. They lost 0–1 with a very late goal by Zambia's Jonas Sakuwaha in the 87th minute of the game. On 6 December, a CECAFA emergency committee made the extraordinary decision to have the match replayed because referee Issa Kagabi (Rwanda) supposedly had whistled the end of the match prematurely. Zambia announced they would refuse to play Ethiopia again. CECAFA secretary general Nicholas Musonye—not present at the emergency committee meeting—threatened that he'd cancel the entire tournament should match be replayed. Ethiopian Football Federation declined to have the match replayed and graciously withdrew from the tournament.

At 2007 CECAFA Cup, Ethiopia suffered a 1–3 loss to Zanzibar and a hard-fought 0–0 draw with Sudan in which they failed to produce a goal despite star Fikru Tefera's call up. This was enough to eliminate Ethiopia from the tournament.

==== Suspension and reinstatement (2008–2009) ====
In the 2008 African Cup of Nations qualifiers, Ethiopia finished bottom of their group after losing their last two games.

In July 2008, a FIFA Emergency Committee decided to suspend the Ethiopian Football Federation (EFF) due to their failure to comply with the road map to normalize the federation agreed upon in February 2008 by FIFA, CAF and EFF. The road map was established in Feb 2008 following the dismissal of the country's football federation president Ashebir Woldegiorgis by the countries authorities. One of the main points of the road map was the organization of an "extraordinary general assembly" to deal with the "motion of dismissal". In addition, the EFF offices were to be handed over to the recognized leadership of the federation.

The suspension of the EFF came into force on 29 July 2008, the day on which the federation had officially been notified of its suspension. Ethiopia played four group level matches in 2010 FIFA World Cup qualification before FIFA announced the immediate suspension of the Ethiopian Football Federation. On 12 September 2008, FIFA excluded the Ethiopian team from the 2010 World Cup qualifiers and the results of their matches were cancelled. Ethiopia's exclusion from the World Cup also led to their exclusion from the Africa Cup of Nations. While it was not clear if the team was also explicitly excluded from the 2010 Africa Cup of Nations, their failure to complete the remaining fixtures effectively eliminated them from the tournament because the 2010 FIFA World Cup qualification was also used to determine the qualification for 2010 Africa Cup of Nations. The team also missed the 2008 CECAFA Cup due to this suspension.

In July 2009, the EFF was reinstated after organizing the extraordinary general assembly and electing new leaders as instructed by FIFA. FIFA's executive committee had voted a month before to lift the suspension so long as that EFF organized and chaired an elective general assembly. FIFA confirmed that it was satisfied with the election.

==== Continued troubles (2009–2011) ====
At the 2009 CECAFA Cup, Ethiopia defeated Djibouti 5–0, but lost 0–1 to Zambia and 0–2 to Kenya, thus finishing third in the group and getting eliminated from the regional tournament.

At the 2010 CECAFA Cup, in Tanzania, Ethiopia was in Group C with Uganda, Kenya and Malawi. After the 1–2 loss to Uganda, Ethiopia beat Kenya 2–1 and came to a 1–1 draw with Malawi. Next opponent was Zambia, and Ethiopia won 2–1 by two goals. In semi-finals however, they lost to Ivory Coast 0–1. In the third-place battle to follow, they lost 3–4 to Uganda to come in fourth place in the tournament. Tournament's star players and goal scorers were Shimelis Bekele of Awassa City and Oumed Oukri of Defence Force. The team had exceeded fans’ expectations by reaching the semi-final stage.

In April 2011, the Ethiopian Football Federation fired national coach Iffy Onuora – just 9 months after he took charge of the Ethiopian national football team. Ethiopian Football Federation cited disciplinary grounds for his dismissal just a month after the team's 4–0 defeat at the hands of the Nigerian Green Eagles in Group B of the 2012 Africa Cup of Nations qualification in Abuja. The Ethiopian national team had played 11 matches during coach Onuora's tenure, winning 4, drawing in 1 and losing 6 matches. The team scored 12 goals and conceded 21 goals in those matches.

In May 2011, the EFF appointed former Zimbabwe and Namibia manager Tom Saintfiet as coach in place of Iffy Onuora. However, Tom Saintfiet left his job as Ethiopia's national soccer coach after just five months, citing "broken promises" as the reason for his departure. Saintfiet had been in charge for three 2012 African Cup of Nations qualification matches, including a 2–2 draw with Nigeria that contributed to the Super Eagles missing out on 2012 Africa Cup of Nations.

=== Recent history (2012–present) ===
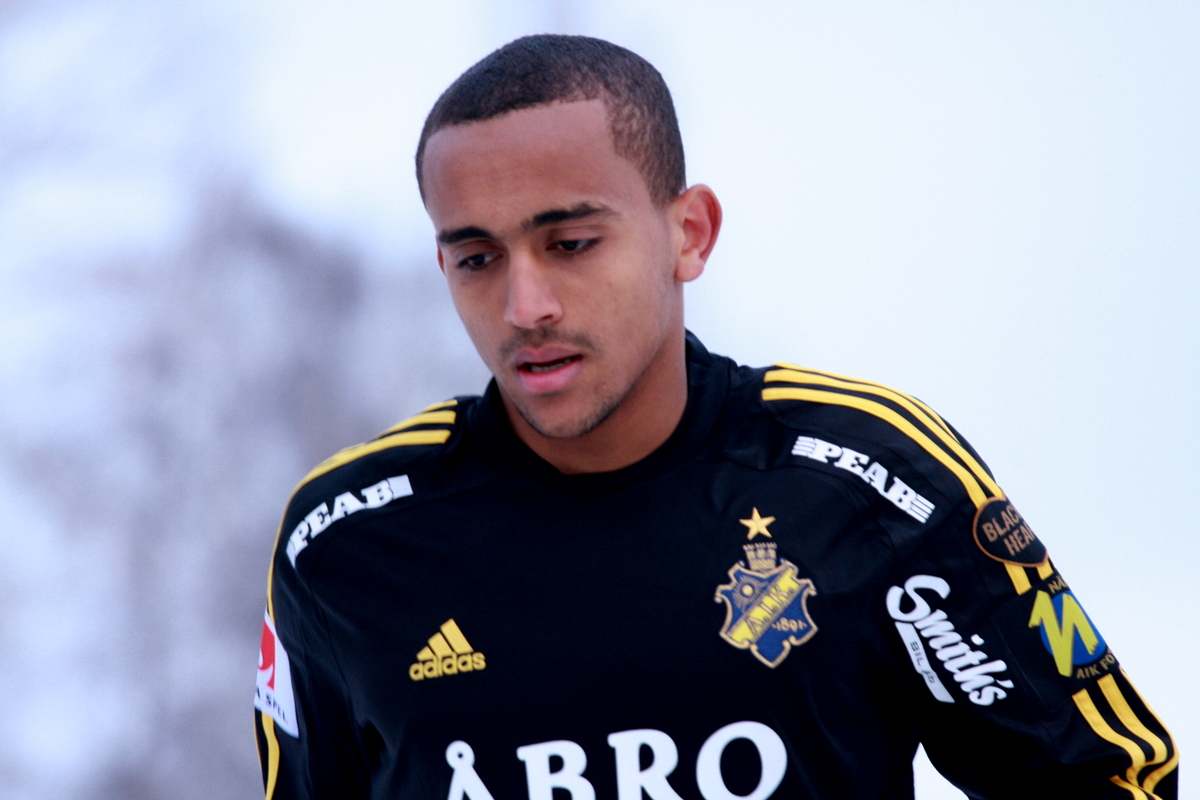
Walid Atta played several games for Ethiopia in the 2010s

==== 2013 African Cup of Nations ====
In the qualification for the 2013 Africa Cup of Nations, Ethiopia tied 1–1 with Benin after a goalless draw in the first leg at home to progress to the last round of qualification because of the away goals rule. In the last round of qualification, Ethiopia again won on the away goals rule after a 5–5 draw in aggregate score against Sudan. This qualified Ethiopia to the Africa Cup of Nations for the first time in 31 years.

==== 2014 World Cup qualification ====
With a 5–0 aggregate victory over Somalia, Ethiopia joined South Africa, Botswana and Central African Republic (CAR) in Group A. Ethiopia drew 1–1 with South Africa away from home and beat CAR at home 2–0 to top the group after the first two games. They beat Botswana twice, 1–0 on 22 March 2013 at home in Addis Ababa and 2–1 on 7 June in Botswana. However, the 7 June win was later awarded to Botswana by a score of 3–0 after it was discovered that Ethiopia fielded an ineligible player. Still, they beat South Africa 2–1 at home on 16 June and secured Ethiopian advancement to the third round after beating CAR away in their final match, which was considered as a historic achievement for the country. The team eventually was eliminated by Nigeria with two defeats in the Third Round, though it remains as the best performance ever by Ethiopia in any World Cup qualification.

== Team image ==
=== Kit history ===
Kit provider	Period
(Germany) Adidas	1983–2004
(Germany) Adidas	2010–2015
(Italy) Erreà	2016–2019
(England) Umbro	2019–2023
(Ethiopia) Gofere	2023–2025
(Italy) Macron	2026-

== Results and fixtures ==
The following is a list of match results in the last 12 months, as well as any future matches that have been scheduled.

Win Draw Loss Fixture

=== 2026 ===
27 March 2027 Africa Cup of Nations qualification	São Tomé and Príncipe	0–3	Ethiopia	El Jadida, Morocco
17:00 UTC+1		Report	Markneh 23'; Yalew 32', 78'	Stadium: Ben M'Hamed El Abdi Stadium; Referee: El Hadji Amadou Sy (Senegal)

31 March 2027 Africa Cup of Nations qualification	Ethiopia	1–0	São Tomé and Príncipe	Dire Dawa, Ethiopia
16:00 UTC+3	Gugesa 7'	Report		Stadium: Dire Dawa Stadium; Referee: Mohamed Marouf (Egypt)

6 June Friendly	Ethiopia	1–0	Malawi	Dire Dawa, Ethiopia
{18:00 UTC+3	Tilahun 1'	Report		Stadium: Dire Dawa Stadium; Referee: Mohamed Diraneh (Djibouti)

9 June Friendly	Ethiopia	1–1	Malawi	Dire Dawa, Ethiopia
19:00 UTC+3	Demte 42'	Report	Adepoju 19'	Stadium: Dire Dawa Stadium

25 September 2027 AFCON qualification	Sudan	v	Ethiopia	Juba, South Sudan
18:00 UTC+0				Stadium: Juba Stadium

29 September 2027 AFCON qualification	Ethiopia	v	Senegal	TBD, Ethiopia
15:00 UTC+0				Stadium: TBD

11 November 2027 AFCON qualification	Mozambique	v	Ethiopia	TBD, Mozambique
TBD				Stadium: TBD

15 November 2027 AFCON qualification	Ethiopia	v	Mozambique	TBD, Ethiopia
TBD				Stadium: TBD

=== 2027 ===
24 March 2027 AFCON qualification	Ethiopia	v	Sudan	TBD, Ethiopia
TBD				Stadium: TBD

28 March 2027 AFCON qualification	Senegal	v	Ethiopia	TBD, Senegal
TBD				Stadium: TBD

== Coaching staff ==
Position	Staff
Head coach	(Ethiopia) Yohannes Sahle
Assistant coach	(Ethiopia) Temesgen Dana
Goalkeeper coach	(Ethiopia) Desalegn Gebregiorgis
Fitness Coach	(Ethiopia) Nigus Solomon Kidane
Head of International Scouting	(Ethiopia) David Beshah
Technical director	(Ethiopia) Daniel Gebremariam

=== Coaching history ===
Caretaker manager are listed in italics.

- (Greece) Edouardos Virvilis (1950–1954)
- (Austria) Georg Braun (1954–1956)
- (Czechoslovakia) Jiří Starosta (1959)
- (Socialist Federal Republic of Yugoslavia) Slavko Milošević (1961)
- (Ethiopia) Yidnekatchew Tessema (1961–1962)
- (Socialist Federal Republic of Yugoslavia) Slavko Milošević (1962)
- (Ethiopia) Yidnekatchew Tessema (1963)
- (Hungary) Ferenc Szűcs (1968–1969)
- (Ethiopia) Luciano Vassalo (1969–1970)
- (Ethiopia) Adamu Alemu (1970)
- (West Germany) Peter Schnittger (1974–1976)
- (Ethiopia) Mengistu Worku (1977–1978)
- (Ethiopia) Mengistu Worku (1980–1982)
- (Ethiopia) Tilahun Tesfaye (1984)
- (Ethiopia) Mengistu Worku (1987)
- (West Germany) Klaus Ebbighausen (1987–1989)
- (Ethiopia) Kassahun Teka (1992–1993)
- (Ethiopia) Gebregiorgis Getahun (1993)
- (Ethiopia) Kassahun Teka (1994–1995)
- (Ethiopia) Seyoum Abate (1996)
- (Ethiopia) Oko Idiba (1997)
- (Ethiopia) Kassahun Teka (1997)
- (Ethiopia) Seyoum Abate (1998–2000)
- (Ethiopia) Asrat Haile (2001)
- (Germany) Jochen Figge (2002–2003)
- (Ethiopia) Asrat Haile (2003)
- (Ethiopia) Seyoum Kebede (2003–2004)
- (Ethiopia) Asrat Haile (2004)
- (Ethiopia) Sewnet Bishaw (2004–2006)
- (Ethiopia) Seyoum Abate (2006)
- (France) Diego Garzitto (2006–2007)
- (Ethiopia) Tesfaye Fetene (2007)
- (Ethiopia) Tsegaye Desta (2007)
- (Ethiopia) Abraham Teklehaymanot (2008–2010)
- (Scotland) Iffy Onuora (2010–2011)
- (Belgium) Tom Saintfiet (2011)
- (Ethiopia) Sewnet Bishaw (2011–2014)
- (Portugal) Mariano Barreto (2014–2015)
- (Ethiopia) Yohannes Sahle (2015–2016) (2026–)
- (Ethiopia) Gebremedhin Haile (2016)
- (Ethiopia) Ashenafi Bekele (2017)
- (Ethiopia) Abraham Mebratu (2018–2020)
- (Ethiopia) Wubetu Abate (2020–2023)
- (Ethiopia) Daniel Gebremariam (2023)
- (Ethiopia) Gebremedhin Haile (2023–2024)
- (Ethiopia) Mesay Teferi (2024 -2025)
- (Ethiopia) Yohannes Sahle (2026 -)

== Players ==
=== Current squad ===
The following players were called up for the 2027 AFCON qualification matches against Sao Tome and Principe matches on 27 and 31 March 2026.

Caps and goals correct as of 27 March 2026, after the match against Sao Tome and Principe.

No.	Pos.	Player	Date of birth (age)	Caps	Goals	Club
	GK	Seid Habtamu	5 April 1998 (age 28)	19	0	(Ethiopian Football Federation) Adama City
	GK	Abubeker Nura	11 September 2000 (age 26)	4	0	(Ethiopian Football Federation) Ethiopian Insurance
	GK	Firew Getahun	12 June 1992 (age 34)	3	0	(Ethiopian Football Federation) CBE
	DF	Yared Bayeh	22 January 1995 (age 31)	54	1	(Ethiopian Football Federation) Sidama Coffee
	DF	Asrat Tunjo	29 November 1996 (age 29)	28	0	(Ethiopian Football Federation) Dire Dawa City
	DF	Mignot Debebe	2 September 1995 (age 31)	19	0	(Ethiopian Football Federation) Fasil Kenema
	DF	Yared Kassaye	1 January 2003 (age 23)	13	0	(Ethiopian Football Federation) Ethiopian Insurance
	DF	Ramkel James	11 July 2001 (age 25)	12	1	(Ethiopian Football Federation) Ethiopian Coffee
	DF	Abduselam Yusuf	22 September 2002 (age 24)	2	0	(Ethiopian Football Federation) Dire Dawa City
	DF	Alembirhan Yigzaw	3 January 2001 (age 25)	0	0	(Ethiopian Football Federation) Defence Force
	DF	Girum Hagos	15 January 2001 (age 25)	0	0	(Ethiopian Football Federation) Defence Force
	MF	Gatoch Panom (captain)	12 June 1994 (age 32)	69	8	(Saudi Arabian Football Federation) Al-Arabi SC
	MF	Wogene Gezahegn	5 July 2006 (age 20)	14	0	(Ethiopian Football Federation) Ethiopian Insurance
	MF	Biniam Ayten	31 March 2003 (age 23)	9	1	(Ethiopian Football Federation) Adama City
	MF	Habtamu Tekeste	11 September 1998 (age 28)	8	0	(Ethiopian Football Federation) Fasil Kenema
	MF	Biruk Endale	5 October 2000 (age 26)	0	0	(Ethiopian Football Federation) Welwalo Adigrat
	MF	Buzuayehu Seife	7 August 1995 (age 31)	0	0	(Ethiopian Football Federation) Adama City
	FW	Chernet Gugesa	13 September 1999 (age 27)	35	2	(Ethiopian Football Federation) Bahir Dar Kenema
	FW	Kenean Markneh	30 March 1998 (age 28)	32	4	(Oman Football Association) Al-Shabab
	FW	Abel Yalew	23 March 1996 (age 30)	24	3	(Egyptian Football Association) ZED
	FW	Mesfin Tafesse	26 November 2001 (age 24)	16	3	(Ethiopian Football Federation) Ethiopian Coffee
	FW	Abubeker Sani	23 November 1997 (age 28)	5	3	(Ethiopian Football Federation) Adama City
	FW	Kebe Bizuneh		0	0	(Ethiopian Football Federation) Negele Arsi Town

=== Recent call-ups ===
The following players have been called up for Ethiopia in the last 12 months.

Pos.	Player	Date of birth (age)	Caps	Goals	Club	Latest call-up
Notes: ^{PRE} = Preliminary squad/standby.; ^{INJ} = Not part of the current squad due to injury.; ^{SUS} = Player is suspended.; ^{RET} = Retired from international football.

== Records ==
As of 24 March 2025
Players in bold are still active with Ethiopia.

=== Most appearances ===
Rank	Player	Caps	Goals	Career
1	Shimelis Bekele	81	15	2010–2023
2	**Aschalew Tamene**	73	3	2015–present
3	**Gatoch Panom**	69	8	2012–present
4	Getaneh Kebede	66	33	2010–2022
5	**Yared Bayeh**	54	1	2015–present
6	Adane Girma	49	9	2004–2014
7	Oumed Oukri	48	12	2009–2023
8	Abebaw Butako	46	2	2008–2017
9	Degu Debebe	44	0	2003–2014
9	**Ramadan Yusef**	44	1	2019–present

=== Top goalscorers ===
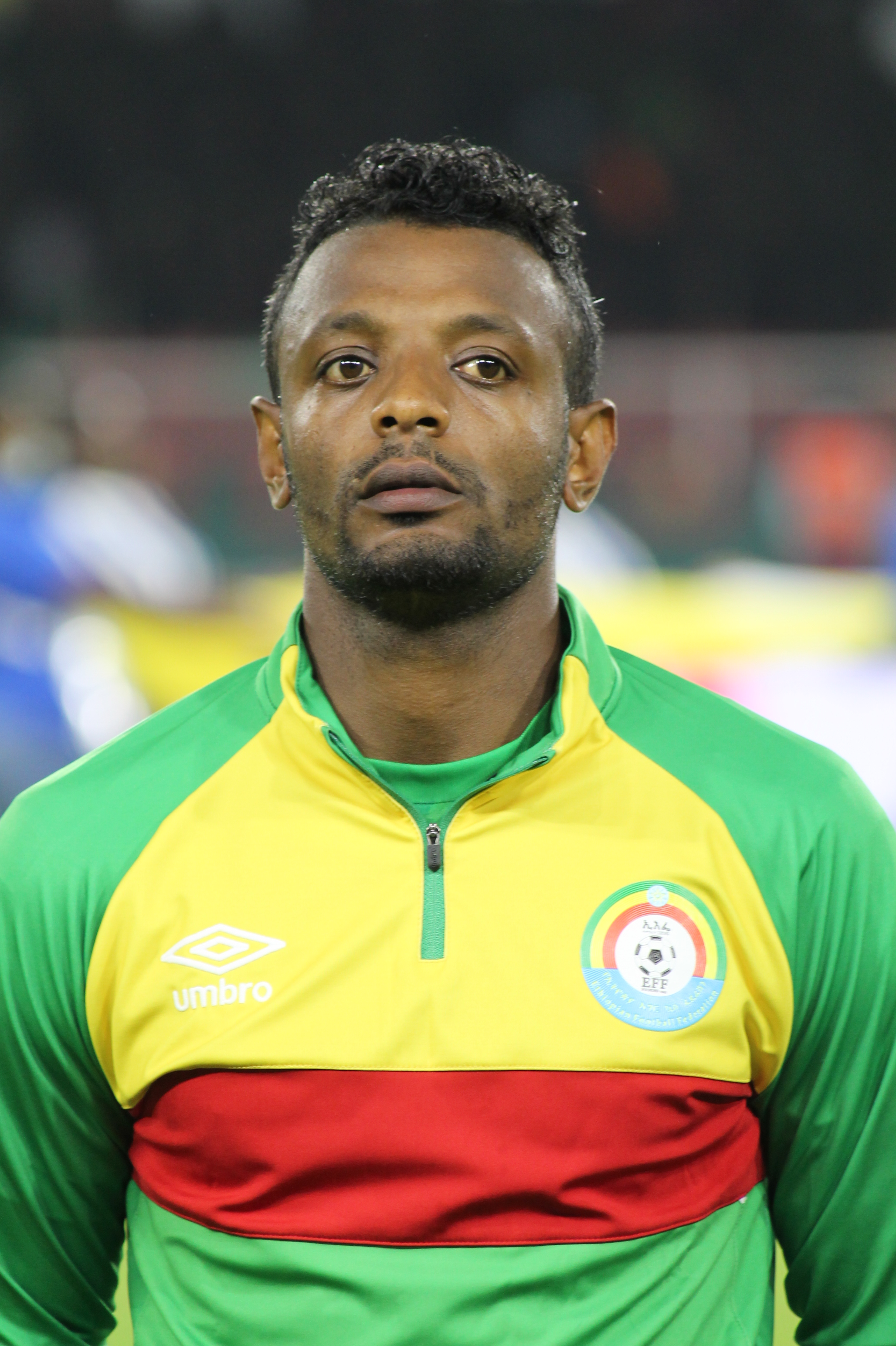
Getaneh Kebede is Ethiopia's top scorer with 33 goals.

Rank	Name	Goals	Caps	Ratio	Career
1	Getaneh Kebede	33	66	0.5	2010–2022
2	Mengistu Worku	26	26	1	1959–1970
3	Shimelis Bekele	15	81	0.19	2010–2023
4	Saladin Said	14	28	0.5	2007–2017
5	Oumed Oukri	12	48	0.25	2009–2023
6	Fikru Teferra	11	25	0.44	2004–2014
7	Adane Girma	9	49	0.18	2004–2014
8	**Abubeker Nassir**	8	23	0.35	2019–present
8	**Gatoch Panom**	8	69	0.12	2012–present
10	Amanuel Gebremichael	7	42	0.17	2017–2023

== Competitive record ==
=== FIFA World Cup ===
FIFA World Cup record									Qualification record					
Year	Round	Position	Pld	W	D*	L	GF	GA	Pld	W	D	L	GF	GA
1930 to 1950	Not a FIFA member								Not a FIFA member					
(Switzerland) 1954	Did not enter								Did not enter					
(Sweden) 1958	Entry not accepted by FIFA								Entry not accepted by FIFA					
(Chile) 1962	Did not qualify								2	0	0	2	2	4
(England) 1966	Did not enter								Did not enter					
(Mexico) 1970	Did not qualify								4	1	1	2	7	7
(West Germany) 1974	Did not qualify								5	1	3	1	6	5
(Argentina) 1978	Did not qualify								2	0	0	2	1	5
(Spain) 1982	Did not qualify								2	0	1	1	0	4
(Mexico) 1986	Did not qualify								2	0	1	1	4	5
(Italy) 1990	Did not enter								Did not enter					
(United States) 1994	Did not qualify								6	1	1	4	3	11
(France) 1998	Did not enter								Did not enter					
(South Korea) (Japan) 2002	Did not qualify								2	1	0	1	2	4
(Germany) 2006	Did not qualify								2	0	1	1	1	3
(South Africa) 2010	Disqualified due to FIFA suspension								Disqualified					
(Brazil) 2014	Did not qualify								10	5	2	3	14	10
(Russia) 2018	Did not qualify								4	1	0	3	7	7
(Qatar) 2022	Did not qualify								8	1	4	3	5	8
(Canada) (Mexico) (United States) 2026	Did not qualify								10	2	3	5	9	14
(Morocco) (Portugal) (Spain) 2030	To be determined								To be determined					
(Saudi Arabia) 2034	To be determined								To be determined					
Total	–	0/18	–	–	–	–	–	–	59	13	17	29	61	87

=== Africa Cup of Nations ===
Africa Cup of Nations record									Qualification record					
Year	Round	Position	Pld	W	D	L	GF	GA	Pld	W	D	L	GF	GA
(Sudan) 1957	Runners-up	2nd	1	0	0	1	0	4	No qualification					
(United Arab Republic) 1959	Third place	3rd	2	0	0	2	0	5	No qualification					
(Ethiopia) 1962	Champions	1st	2	2	0	0	8	4	Qualified as hosts					
(Ghana) 1963	Fourth place	4th	3	1	0	2	4	7	Qualified as defending champions					
(Tunisia) 1965	Group stage	5th	2	0	0	2	1	9	4	3	0	1	6	3
(Ethiopia) 1968	Fourth place	4th	5	3	0	2	8	6	Qualified as hosts					
(Sudan) 1970	Group stage	6th	3	0	0	3	3	12	2	2	0	0	9	1
(Cameroon) 1972	Did not qualify								2	0	0	2	0	3
(Egypt) 1974	Did not qualify								2	1	0	1	2	4
(Ethiopia) 1976	Group stage	5th	3	1	1	1	4	3	Qualified as hosts					
(Ghana) 1978	Did not qualify								4	2	1	1	5	4
(Nigeria) 1980	Did not qualify								2	0	1	1	2	3
(Libya) 1982	Group stage	8th	3	0	1	2	0	4	4	1	2	1	4	4
(Ivory Coast) 1984	Did not qualify								4	2	0	2	3	5
(Egypt) 1986	Withdrew								Withdrew					
(Morocco) 1988	Withdrew during qualifying								1	0	0	1	2	4
(Algeria) 1990	Did not qualify								2	1	0	1	2	6
(Senegal) 1992	Withdrew during qualifying								6	0	0	6	0	12
(Tunisia) 1994	Did not qualify								6	2	1	3	7	12
(South Africa) 1996	Did not qualify								10	2	2	6	4	18
(Burkina Faso) 1998	Did not qualify								6	0	3	5	5	21
(Ghana) (Nigeria) 2000	Withdrew								Withdrew					
(Mali) 2002	Did not qualify								2	1	0	1	1	2
(Tunisia) 2004	Did not qualify								6	3	0	3	5	7
(Egypt) 2006	Did not qualify								2	0	1	1	1	3
(Ghana) 2008	Did not qualify								6	2	0	4	5	9
(Angola) 2010	Disqualified								4	2	0	2	8	6
(Equatorial Guinea) (Gabon) 2012	Did not qualify								6	2	1	3	8	13
(South Africa) 2013	Group stage	16th	3	0	1	2	1	7	4	1	2	1	6	6
(Equatorial Guinea) 2015	Did not qualify								6	1	1	4	7	12
(Gabon) 2017	Did not qualify								6	3	2	1	11	14
(Egypt) 2019	Did not qualify								4	0	1	3	0	10
(Cameroon) 2021	Group stage	23rd	3	0	1	2	2	6	6	3	0	3	10	6
(Ivory Coast) 2023	Did not qualify								6	1	1	4	5	8
(Morocco) 2025	Did not qualify								6	1	1	4	3	12
(Kenya) (Tanzania) (Uganda) 2027	To be determined								To be determined					
2028	To be determined								To be determined					
Total	1 Title	11/35	30	7	4	19	31	67	119	36	20	63	116	208

== Honours ==
=== Continental ===
- CAF African Cup of Nations
  - Champions (1): 1962
  - (silver) Runners-up (1): 1957
  - (bronze) Third place (1): 1959

=== Regional ===
- CECAFA Cup
  - (gold) Champions (4): 1987, 2001, 2004, 2005
  - (bronze) Third place (2) 2000, 2015

=== Summary ===
Competition	1st place, gold medalist(s)	2nd place, silver medalist(s)	3rd place, bronze medalist(s)	Total
CAF African Cup of Nations	1	1	1	3
Total	1	1	1	3
