= 2027 Africa Cup of Nations qualification =

Tournament details
- Dates: 25 March 2026 – 30 March 2027
- Teams: 54 (from 1 confederation)

Tournament statistics
- Matches played: 84
- Goals scored: 221 (2.63 per match)
- Top scorer(s): (South Africa) Relebohile Mofokeng (5 goals)
- All statistics correct as of 14 November 2026.

The 2027 Africa Cup of Nations qualification matches are being organised by the Confederation of African Football (CAF) to decide the participating teams of the 2027 Africa Cup of Nations in Kenya, Uganda and Tanzania, the 36th edition of the international men's football championship of Africa. The qualification began with the preliminary round, which ran from 25 to 31 March 2026, and concludes with the group stage, which is being played in September, October and November 2026, and March 2027 for the final rounds. A total of 24 teams will qualify to play in the final tournament, including automatically qualified co-hosts Kenya, Uganda and Tanzania.

== Entrants ==
All 54 CAF member associations entered the competition. The seeding was based on the FIFA World Ranking from 19 November 2025.

A total of 48 teams, including the three co-hosts, are competing in the qualifying group stage. Teams ranked 1st to 42nd received a bye to that stage, while the teams ranked 43rd to 54th participated in the preliminary round.

Eritrea and Seychelles made their returns to the qualifying stage after being excluded in the previous edition, despite the former being unranked by FIFA at the time of seeding due to a lack of recent matches.

From the November 2026 FIFA World Rankings
Bye to group stage	Participating in preliminary round
1. Morocco (5); 2. Senegal (18); 3. Egypt (25); 4. Algeria (28); 5. Ivory Coast (29); 6. Nigeria (30); 7. DR Congo (40); 8. Cameroon (42); 9. Mali (47); 10. South Africa (48); 11. Tunisia (61); 12. Burkina Faso (62); 13. Cape Verde (68); 14. Ghana (70); 15. Guinea (82); 16. Angola (83); 17. Gabon (85); 18. Uganda (87; co-hosts); 19. Benin (89); 20. Zambia (91); 21. Mozambique (98); 22. Equatorial Guinea (103); 23. Madagascar (106); 24. Comoros (107); 25. Gambia (109); 26. Mauritania (110); 27. Niger (111); 28. Libya (113); 29. Kenya (114; co-hosts); 30. Tanzania (115; co-hosts); 31. Sudan (118); 32. Rwanda (119); 33. Togo (120); 34. Namibia (123); 35. Guinea-Bissau (124); 36. Zimbabwe (129); 37. Sierra Leone (130); 38. Malawi (131); 39. Congo (132); 40. Burundi (140); 41. Botswana (141); 42. Central African Republic (145)	43. Liberia (146); 44. Ethiopia (147); 45. Lesotho (150); 46. Eswatini (164); 47. South Sudan (170); 48. Mauritius (179); 49. Chad (181); 50. Eritrea (183); 51. São Tomé and Príncipe (194); 52. Djibouti (195); 53. Somalia (200); 54. Seychelles (205)

== Schedule ==
The schedule of the qualifying tournament is as follows.

Round	Matchday	Dates	Matches
Preliminary round	First leg	25–27 March 2026	Team 1 vs. Team 2
Preliminary round	Second leg	29–31 March 2026	Team 2 vs. Team 1
Group stage	Matchday 1	24 September – 6 October 2026	Team 1 vs. Team 2 Team 3 vs. Team 4
Group stage	Matchday 2	24 September – 6 October 2026	Team 2 vs. Team 3 Team 4 vs. Team 1
Group stage	Matchday 3	12–17 November 2026	Team 1 vs. Team 3 Team 2 vs. Team 4
Group stage	Matchday 4	12–17 November 2026	Team 3 vs. Team 1 Team 4 vs. Team 2
Group stage	Matchday 5	22–30 March 2027	Team 2 vs. Team 1 Team 4 vs. Team 3
Group stage	Matchday 6	22–30 March 2027	Team 3 vs. Team 2 Team 1 vs. Team 4

== Preliminary round ==
The twelve teams were split into six ties which were played in home-and-away two-legged format.

Team 1	Agg.	Team 2	1st leg	2nd leg
Djibouti	1–4	South Sudan	0–4	1–0
Chad	0–8	Burundi	0–4	0–4
Somalia	0–0 (4–2 p)	Mauritius	0–0	0–0
Seychelles	1–2	Lesotho	0–0	1–2
Eritrea	4–1	Eswatini	2–0	2–1
São Tomé and Príncipe	0–4	Ethiopia	0–3	0–1

== Group stage ==
=== Draw ===
The group stage draw took place on 19 May 2026 at 15:00 (UTC+3) in Cairo, Egypt. The 48 national teams involved were divided into twelve groups of four each, which consisted of the 42 teams that entered directly, in addition to the six winners of the preliminary round, and were seeded into four pots of twelve each based on the April 2026 FIFA World Rankings (shown in parentheses).

Teams in bold qualified for the final tournament.

Pot 1	Pot 2	Pot 3	Pot 4
**Morocco** (8); **Senegal** (14); Nigeria (26); Algeria (28); Egypt (29); Ivory Coast (34); Tunisia (44); **Cameroon** (45); DR Congo (46); **Mali** (52); South Africa (60); **Burkina Faso** (62)	Cape Verde (69); Ghana (74); Guinea (80); Gabon (87); **Uganda** (88; co-hosts); Angola (89); **Benin** (90); Zambia (92); Mozambique (101); Madagascar (104); Equatorial Guinea (105); Comoros (109)	**Kenya** (111; co-hosts); Libya (112); **Tanzania** (113; co-hosts); Niger (114); Mauritania (115); Gambia (116); Sudan (117); Sierra Leone (119); Namibia (120); Togo (121); Malawi (127); Rwanda (128)	Zimbabwe (130); Guinea-Bissau (132); Congo (133); Central African Republic (139); Liberia (140); Burundi (142); Ethiopia (144); Lesotho (145); Botswana (146); South Sudan (170); Eritrea (184); Somalia (198)

=== Tiebreakers ===
The teams are ranked according to points (3 points for a win, 1 point for a draw, 0 points for a loss). If tied on points, tiebreakers are applied in the following order (Regulations Article 14):

1. Points in head-to-head matches among tied teams;
2. Goal difference in head-to-head matches among tied teams;
3. Goals scored in head-to-head matches among tied teams;
4. Away goals scored in head-to-head matches among tied teams;
5. If more than two teams are tied, and after applying all head-to-head criteria above, a subset of teams are still tied, all head-to-head criteria above will be reapplied exclusively to this subset of teams;
6. Goal difference in all group matches;
7. Goals scored in all group matches;
8. Away goals scored in all group matches;
9. Drawing of lots

=== Group A ===
Pos	Team	Pld	W	D	L	GF	GA	GD	Pts	Qualification	(Morocco)	(Gabon)	(Lesotho)	(Niger)
1	Morocco (Q)	4	4	0	0	10	1	+9	**12**	Final tournament	—	2–0	28 Mar	5–1
2	Gabon	4	2	0	2	5	4	+1	**6**	Final tournament	24 Mar	—	2–0	2–0
3	Lesotho	4	1	0	3	3	7	−4	**3**		0–2	2–1	—	24 Mar
4	Niger	4	1	0	3	3	9	−6	**3**		0–1	28 Mar	2–1	—

Updated to match(es) played on 17 November 2026. Source: CAF
Rules for classification: Tiebreakers
(Q) Qualified for the phase indicated

=== Group B ===
Pos	Team	Pld	W	D	L	GF	GA	GD	Pts	Qualification	(Angola)	(Egypt)	(Malawi)	(South Sudan)
1	Angola	4	3	1	0	6	1	+5	**10**	Final tournament	—	24 Mar	3–1	2–0
2	Egypt	4	2	2	0	10	0	+10	**8**	Final tournament	0–0	—	5–0	28 Mar
3	Malawi	4	1	1	2	3	9	−6	**4**		28 Mar	0–0	—	2–1
4	South Sudan (E)	4	0	0	4	1	10	−9	**0**		0–1	0–5	24 Mar	—

Updated to match(es) played on 17 November 2026. Source: CAF
Rules for classification: Tiebreakers
(E) Eliminated

=== Group C ===
Pos	Team	Pld	W	D	L	GF	GA	GD	Pts	Qualification	(Ivory Coast)	(The Gambia)	(Ghana)	(Somalia)
1	Ivory Coast	4	3	1	0	8	3	+5	**10**	Final tournament	—	2–1	2–0	28 Mar
2	Gambia	4	2	1	1	9	7	+2	**7**	Final tournament	2–2	—	28 Mar	2–1
3	Ghana	4	2	0	2	5	6	−1	**6**		24 Mar	2–4	—	2–0
4	Somalia (E)	4	0	0	4	1	7	−6	**0**		0–2	24 Mar	0–1	—

Updated to match(es) played on 17 November 2026. Source: CAF
Rules for classification: Tiebreakers
(E) Eliminated

=== Group D ===
Pos	Team	Pld	W	D	L	GF	GA	GD	Pts	Qualification	(South Africa)	(Guinea)	(Kenya)	(Eritrea)
1	South Africa	4	3	1	0	11	4	+7	**10**	Final tournament	—	2–1	2–2	28 Mar
2	Guinea	4	3	0	1	7	4	+3	**9**		24 Mar	—	1–0	2–1
3	Kenya (Note: Kenya has already qualified for the final tournament as a host nation.) (Q)	4	0	2	2	4	6	−2	**2**	Final tournament	1–2	28 Mar	—	1–1
4	Eritrea (E)	4	0	1	3	3	11	−8	**1**		0–5	1–3	24 Mar	—

Updated to match(es) played on 17 November 2026. Source: CAF
Rules for classification: Tiebreakers
(E) Eliminated; (Q) Qualified for the phase indicated

=== Group E ===
Pos	Team	Pld	W	D	L	GF	GA	GD	Pts	Qualification	(Democratic Republic of the Congo)	(Zimbabwe)	(Equatorial Guinea)	(Sierra Leone)
1	DR Congo	4	3	1	0	8	3	+5	**10**	Final tournament	—	28 Mar	2–0	3–1
2	Zimbabwe	4	2	1	1	7	4	+3	**7**	Final tournament	1–2	—	3–0	24 Mar
3	Equatorial Guinea	4	1	1	2	1	5	−4	**4**		24 Mar	0–0	—	1–0
4	Sierra Leone	4	0	1	3	4	8	−4	**1**		1–1	2–3	28 Mar	—

Updated to match(es) played on 17 November 2026. Source: CAF
Rules for classification: Tiebreakers

=== Group F ===
Pos	Team	Pld	W	D	L	GF	GA	GD	Pts	Qualification	(Benin)	(Burkina Faso)	(Mauritania)	(Central African Republic)
1	Benin (Q)	4	3	1	0	8	3	+5	**10**	Final tournament	—	24 Mar	2–1	4–1
2	Burkina Faso (Q)	4	3	1	0	6	2	+4	**10**	Final tournament	1–1	—	1–0	28 Mar
3	Mauritania (E)	4	1	0	3	5	7	−2	**3**		28 Mar	1–3	—	3–1
4	Central African Republic (E)	4	0	0	4	2	9	−7	**0**		0–1	0–1	24 Mar	—

Updated to match(es) played on 17 November 2026. Source: CAF
Rules for classification: Tiebreakers
(E) Eliminated; (Q) Qualified for the phase indicated

=== Group G ===
Pos	Team	Pld	W	D	L	GF	GA	GD	Pts	Qualification	(Cameroon)	(Comoros)	(Namibia)	(Republic of the Congo)
1	Cameroon (Q)	4	3	1	0	9	2	+7	**10**	Final tournament	—	3–1	2–0	28 Mar
2	Comoros	4	2	1	1	3	3	0	**7**	Final tournament	24 Mar	—	1–0	0–0
3	Namibia	4	1	0	3	1	6	−5	**3**		0–3	28 Mar	—	1–0
4	Congo	4	0	2	2	1	3	−2	**2**		1–1	0–1	24 Mar	—

Updated to match(es) played on 17 November 2026. Source: CAF
Rules for classification: Tiebreakers
(Q) Qualified for the phase indicated

=== Group H ===
Pos	Team	Pld	W	D	L	GF	GA	GD	Pts	Qualification	(Uganda)	(Libya)	(Botswana)	(Tunisia)
1	Uganda (Note: Uganda has already qualified for the final tournament as a host nation.) (Q)	4	1	3	0	4	3	+1	**6**	Final tournament	—	1–0	1–1	24 Mar
2	Libya	4	1	2	1	6	5	+1	**5**	Final tournament	28 Mar	—	2–2	1–1
3	Botswana	4	0	4	0	6	6	0	**4**		1–1	24 Mar	—	28 Mar
4	Tunisia	4	0	3	1	5	7	−2	**3**		1–1	0–2	2–2	—

Updated to match(es) played on 17 November 2026. Source: CAF
Rules for classification: Tiebreakers
(Q) Qualified for the phase indicated

=== Group I ===
Pos	Team	Pld	W	D	L	GF	GA	GD	Pts	Qualification	(Algeria)	(Togo)	(Zambia)	(Burundi)
1	Algeria	4	2	1	1	6	6	0	**7**	Final tournament	—	1–0	3–1	28 Mar
2	Togo	4	2	0	2	4	3	+1	**6**	Final tournament	3–0	—	28 Mar	1–0
3	Zambia	4	1	2	1	5	5	0	**5**		24 Mar	2–0	—	1–1
4	Burundi	4	0	3	1	4	5	−1	**3**		2–2	24 Mar	1–1	—

Updated to match(es) played on 17 November 2026. Source: CAF
Rules for classification: Tiebreakers

=== Group J ===
Pos	Team	Pld	W	D	L	GF	GA	GD	Pts	Qualification	(Senegal)	(Mozambique)	(Sudan)	(Ethiopia)
1	Senegal (Q)	4	3	1	0	10	4	+6	**10**	Final tournament	—	24 Mar	4–1	28 Mar
2	Mozambique	4	2	1	1	6	3	+3	**7**	Final tournament	1–1	—	4–1	0–1
3	Sudan	4	1	0	3	5	12	−7	**3**		2–4	28 Mar	—	1–0
4	Ethiopia	4	1	0	3	1	3	−2	**3**		0–1	0–1	24 Mar	—

Updated to match(es) played on 17 November 2026. Source: CAF
Rules for classification: Tiebreakers
(Q) Qualified for the phase indicated

=== Group K ===
Pos	Team	Pld	W	D	L	GF	GA	GD	Pts	Qualification	(Mali)	(Rwanda)	(Liberia)	(Cape Verde)
1	Mali (Q)	4	4	0	0	9	3	+6	**12**	Final tournament	—	3–2	28 Mar	3–1
2	Rwanda	4	2	0	2	7	7	0	**6**	Final tournament	0–2	—	3–1	28 Mar
3	Liberia	4	1	0	3	5	8	−3	**3**		0–1	24 Mar	—	2–0
4	Cape Verde	4	1	0	3	6	9	−3	**3**		24 Mar	1–2	4–2	—

Updated to match(es) played on 17 November 2026. Source: CAF
Rules for classification: Tiebreakers
(Q) Qualified for the phase indicated

=== Group L ===
Pos	Team	Pld	W	D	L	GF	GA	GD	Pts	Qualification	(Guinea-Bissau)	(Nigeria)	(Madagascar)	(Tanzania)
1	Guinea-Bissau	4	3	1	0	8	1	+7	**10**	Final tournament	—	3–0	2–0	24 Mar
2	Nigeria	4	2	1	1	5	5	0	**7**		28 Mar	—	2–1	3–1
3	Madagascar (E)	4	0	2	2	3	6	−3	**2**		1–1	24 Mar	—	1–1
4	Tanzania (Note: Tanzania has already qualified for the final tournament as a host nation.) (Q)	4	0	2	2	2	6	−4	**2**	Final tournament	0–2	0–0	28 Mar	—

Updated to match(es) played on 17 November 2026. Source: CAF
Rules for classification: Tiebreakers
(E) Eliminated; (Q) Qualified for the phase indicated

== Goalscorers ==
There have been 269 goals scored in 108 matches, for an average of 2.49 goals per match (as of 17 November 2026).

5 goals

- (South Africa) Relebohile Mofokeng

4 goals

- (Burundi) Jean Claude Girumugisha
- (Eritrea) Ali Sulieman

3 goals

- (Angola) Miro
- (Benin) Rodolfo Aloko
- (Benin) Aiyegun Tosin
- (Burundi) Bienvenue Kanakimana
- (Democratic Republic of the Congo) Yoane Wissa
- (Egypt) Omar Marmoush
- (Ethiopia) Abel Yalew
- (Gabon) Denis Bouanga
- (The Gambia) Ebrima Colley
- (Guinea) Yakhouba Gnagna Barry
- (Guinea-Bissau) Mama Baldé
- (Senegal) Nicolas Jackson
- (Zimbabwe) Marshall Munetsi

2 goals

- (Burkina Faso) Aboubacar Camara
- (Burkina Faso) Elohim Kaboré
- (Burkina Faso) Lassina Traoré
- (Burundi) Abdoul Karim Mpawenimana
- (Botswana) Tumisang Orebonye
- (Democratic Republic of the Congo) Samuel Moutoussamy
- (Cameroon) Saidou Alioum
- (Egypt) Mohamed Salah
- (The Gambia) Muhammed Badamosi
- (The Gambia) Musa Barrow
- (Ghana) Felix Afena-Gyan
- (Guinea) Mohamed Soumah
- (Guinea-Bissau) Franculino Djú
- (Ivory Coast) Malick Yalcouyé
- (Kenya) Ryan Ogam
- (Lesotho) Sera Motebang
- (Liberia) Sylvanus Nimely
- (Libya) Ezoo El Maremi
- (Mali) Dorgeles Nene
- (Mali) Ange Martial Tia
- (Mauritania) Aboubakary Koïta
- (Morocco) Achraf Hakimi
- (Mozambique) Chamito
- (Nigeria) Tolu Arokodare
- (Senegal) Ibrahim Mbaye
- (Senegal) Pathé Mboup
- (Sierra Leone) Alie Conteh
- (Togo) Thibault Klidjé
- (Tunisia) Hazem Mastouri
- (Zimbabwe) Tawanda Chirewa

1 goal

- (Algeria) Mohamed Belloumi
- (Algeria) Ramy Bensebaini
- (Algeria) Adil Boulbina
- (Algeria) Anis Hadj Moussa
- (Algeria) Jaouen Hadjam
- (Algeria) Ibrahim Maza
- (Angola) Chico Banza
- (Angola) Mabululu
- (Angola) Felício Milson
- (Benin) Imourane Hassane
- (Benin) Ede Oloko
- (Burundi) Bonfils-Caleb Bimenyimana
- (Burundi) Jordi Liongola
- (Botswana) Lebogang Ditsele
- (Botswana) Thatayaone Kgamanyane
- (Botswana) Losika Ratshukudu
- (Botswana) Godfrey Tauyatswala
- (Cameroon) Bryan Mbeumo
- (Cameroon) Danny Namaso
- (Cameroon) Bil Nsongo
- (Cameroon) David Nyengue
- (Cameroon) Ryan Fosso
- (Cameroon) Aboubakar Nagida
- (Democratic Republic of the Congo) Edo Kayembe
- (Democratic Republic of the Congo) Chancel Mbemba
- (Democratic Republic of the Congo) Junior Kadile
- (Comoros) Warmed Omari
- (Comoros) Benjaloud Youssouf
- (Comoros) Ben-Chayeel Hamada
- (Cape Verde) Gilson Benchimol
- (Cape Verde) Dailon Livramento
- (Cape Verde) Sidny Lopes Cabral
- (Cape Verde) Derensili Sanches Fernandes
- (Cape Verde) Ayoni Santos
- (Cape Verde) Dje Tavares
- (Central African Republic) Goduine Koyalipou
- (Central African Republic) Louis Mafouta
- (Republic of the Congo) Geltany Stalgout Bantsiele
- (Djibouti) Samuel Akinbinu
- (Egypt) Hamza Abdelkarim
- (Egypt) Ibrahim Adel
- (Egypt) Mohamed Hany
- (Egypt) Nasser Maher
- (Egypt) Mostafa Ziko
- (Equatorial Guinea) Loren Zúñiga
- (Eritrea) Siem Eyob-Abraha
- (Eritrea) Maill Lundgren
- (Eritrea) Nahom Netabay
- (Eswatini) Justice Figuareido
- (Ethiopia) Chernet Gugesa
- (Ethiopia) Kenean Markneh
- (Gabon) Rody Junior Effaghe
- (Gabon) Alan Do Marcolino
- (The Gambia) Omar Colley
- (The Gambia) Yankuba Minteh
- (Ghana) Jonas Adjetey
- (Ghana) Ernest Nuamah
- (Ghana) Jordan Ayew
- (Guinea) Seydouba Cissé
- (Guinea) Serhou Guirassy
- (Guinea-Bissau) Álvaro Djaló
- (Guinea-Bissau) Renato Nhaga
- (Guinea-Bissau) Mauro Rodrigues
- (Ivory Coast) Yann Gboho
- (Ivory Coast) Franck Kessié
- (Ivory Coast) Bazoumana Touré
- (Ivory Coast) Elye Wahi
- (Ivory Coast) Christ Inao Oulaï
- (Ivory Coast) Luck Zogbé
- (Kenya) Michael Olunga
- (Kenya) Mohammed Bajaber
- (Lesotho) Lebohang Lesako
- (Lesotho) Motlomelo Mkhwanazi
- (Liberia) Ayouba Kosiah
- (Liberia) Franklin Nyenetue
- (Liberia) Kpah Sherman
- (Libya) Maruwan Alhibeeshi
- (Libya) Hamdou Elhouni
- (Libya) Ali Youssef
- (Madagascar) Warren Caddy
- (Madagascar) Nicolas Fontaine
- (Madagascar) Ehsan Kari
- (Malawi) Babatunde Adepoju
- (Malawi) Lloyd Njaliwa
- (Mali) Mamadou Camara
- (Mali) Kamory Doumbia
- (Mali) Moussa Yeo
- (Mali) Gaoussou Diarra
- (Mali) Modibo Sagnan
- (Mauritania) Dawda Camara
- (Mauritania) Mamadou Diallo
- (Mauritania) Mohamed Ali Diadié
- (Morocco) Brahim Díaz
- (Morocco) Youssef En-Nesyri
- (Morocco) Noussair Mazraoui
- (Morocco) Azzedine Ounahi
- (Morocco) Ayoub Oufkir
- (Morocco) Soufiane Rahimi
- (Morocco) Yassir Zabiri
- (Morocco) Abdellah Ouazane
- (Mozambique) Geny Catamo
- (Mozambique) Guima
- (Mozambique) Witi
- (Mozambique) Stanley Ratifo
- (Namibia) Bethuel Muzeu
- (Niger) Mohamed Abdouramane
- (Niger) Oumar Sako
- (Niger) Daniel Sosah
- (Nigeria) George Ilenikhena
- (Nigeria) Moses Usor
- (Nigeria) Alhassan Yusuf
- (Rwanda) Abeddy Biramahire
- (Rwanda) Elie Iradukunda
- (Rwanda) Phanuel Kavita
- (Rwanda) Jojea Kwizera
- (Rwanda) Joy-Lance Mickels
- (Rwanda) Leroy-Jacques Mickels
- (Rwanda) Claude Niyomugabo
- (Senegal) Boulaye Dia
- (Senegal) El Hadji Malick Diouf
- (Senegal) Paul Mendy
- (Seychelles) Brandon Labrosse
- (Sierra Leone) Samuel Bekoe
- (Sierra Leone) Sallieu Tarawallie
- (Somalia) Bilal Njie
- (South Africa) Samukelo Kabini
- (South Africa) Ime Okon
- (South Africa) Iqraam Rayners
- (South Africa) Luther Singh
- (South Africa) Sphephelo Sithole
- (South Sudan) Joseph Dhata
- (South Sudan) Bangasi Justin
- (South Sudan) Mangar Keer
- (South Sudan) Teng Kuol
- (South Sudan) Peter Maker
- (Sudan) Abuaagla Abdalla
- (Sudan) Mohamed Eisa
- (Sudan) Yasin Hamed
- (Sudan) Salah Adel
- (Sudan) Al-Jezoli Nouh
- (Tanzania) Cyprian Kachwele
- (Tanzania) Alphonce Msanga
- (Togo) Dermane Karim
- (Togo) Kennedy Boateng
- (Tunisia) Adem Arous
- (Tunisia) Anis Ben Slimane
- (Uganda) James Bogere
- (Uganda) Rogers Mato
- (Uganda) Arnold Vula
- (Zambia) Edward Chilufya
- (Zambia) Albert Kangwanda
- (Zambia) Eliya Mandanji
- (Zambia) Fashion Sakala
- (Zimbabwe) Tawanda Maswanhise
- (Zimbabwe) Thandolwenkosi Ngwenya

1 own goal

- (Algeria) Farès Chaïbi (against Burundi)
- (Angola) Kialonda Gaspar (against Malawi)
- (Burundi) Akbar Muderi (against Zambia)
- (Republic of the Congo) Melvin Zinga (against Cameroon)
- (Kenya) Amos Wanjala (against South Africa)

== Qualified teams ==
The following teams have qualified for the final tournament.

Team	Qualification method	Date of qualification	Appearance(s)				Previous best performance (Note: Bold text indicates they hosted that edition.)	WR					
Team	Qualification method	Date of qualification	Kenya	Co-hosts	27 September 2023	7th	Previous best performance	WR	1972	2019	1	Group stage (1972, 1988, 1990, 1992, 2004, 2019)	TBD
Tanzania	5th	1980	2025	Co-hosts	27 September 2023	3	Round of 16 (2025)	TBD					
Uganda	9th	1962	2025	Co-hosts	27 September 2023	2	Runners-up (1978)	TBD					
Senegal	Group J winners or runners-up	17 November 2026	19th	1965	2025	7	**Champions** (2021)	TBD					
Mali	Group K winners or runners-up	17 November 2026	15th	1972	2025	11	Runners-up (1972)	TBD					
Cameroon	Group G winners or runners-up	17 November 2026	23rd	1970	2025	7	**Champions** (1984, 1988, 2000, 2002, 2017)	TBD					
Benin	Group F winners or runners-up	17 November 2026	6th	2004	2025	2	Quarter-finals (2019)	TBD					
Burkina Faso	Group F winners or runners-up	17 November 2026	15th	1978	2025	4	Runners-up (2013)	TBD					
Morocco	Group A winners or runners-up	17 November 2026	21st	1972	2025	6	**Champions** (1976, 2025)	TBD					

^{1} Bold indicates champions for that year. Italics indicates hosts for that year.
