= 2027 Africa Cup of Nations qualification Group E =

2027 AFCON qualifying group E

Group E of the 2027 Africa Cup of Nations qualification is one of twelve groups that will decide the teams which will qualify for the 2027 Africa Cup of Nations final tournament in Kenya, Tanzania and Uganda. The group consists of four teams: DR Congo, Equatorial Guinea, Sierra Leone and Zimbabwe.

The teams will play against each other in a home-and-away round-robin format between September 2026 and March 2027.

== Standings ==
Pos	Team	Pld	W	D	L	GF	GA	GD	Pts	Qualification	(Democratic Republic of the Congo)	(Zimbabwe)	(Equatorial Guinea)	(Sierra Leone)
1	DR Congo	4	3	1	0	8	3	+5	10	Final tournament	—	28 Mar	2–0	3–1
2	Zimbabwe	4	2	1	1	7	4	+3	7	Final tournament	1–2	—	3–0	24 Mar
3	Equatorial Guinea	4	1	1	2	1	5	−4	4		24 Mar	0–0	—	1–0
4	Sierra Leone	4	0	1	3	4	8	−4	1		1–1	2–3	28 Mar	—

Updated to match(es) played on 17 November 2026. Source: CAF
Rules for classification: Tiebreakers

== Matches ==
24 September 2026
17:00 UTC+1

DR Congo	2–0	Equatorial Guinea
Mbemba 4'; Wissa 72'	Report

Martyrs Stadium, Kinshasa
Referee: Joseph Odey Ogabor (Nigeria)
24 September 2026
19:00 UTC+0

Sierra Leone	2–3	Zimbabwe
Conteh 7'; Tarawallie 27'	Report	Munetsi 72', 89'; Chirewa 77'

Ben M'Hamed El Abdi Stadium, El Jadida (Morocco) (Note: Sierra Leone played their home matches in Morocco because the country does not have any stadiums that meet CAF's requirements.)
Referee: Lucky Razake Kasalirwe (Uganda)

28 September 2026
17:00 UTC+1

Equatorial Guinea	1–0	Sierra Leone
Zúñiga 1'	Report

Ahmadou Ahidjo Stadium, Yaoundé (Cameroon) (Note: Equatorial Guinea played their home matches in Cameroon because the country does not have any stadiums that meet CAF's requirements.)
Referee: Fabrice Senyo (Togo)
28 September 2026
18:00 UTC+2

Zimbabwe	1–2	DR Congo
Munetsi 90+3'	Report	Wissa 30'; Moutoussamy 45+2'

National Sports Stadium, Harare
Referee: Amin Omar (Egypt)

12 November 2026
17:00 UTC+1

DR Congo	3–1	Sierra Leone
Wissa 4'; Moutoussamy 35'; Kayembe 58'	Report	Bekoe 83'

Martyrs Stadium, Kinshasa
Referee: Peter Waweru (Kenya)
12 November 2026
17:00 UTC+1

Equatorial Guinea	0–0	Zimbabwe
	Report

Ahmadou Ahidjo Stadium, Yaoundé (Cameroon)
Referee: Ahmed Arajiga (Tanzania)

16 November 2026
15:00 UTC+2

Zimbabwe	3–0	Equatorial Guinea
Ngwenya 4'; Chirewa 71'; Maswanhise 78'	Report

National Sports Stadium, Harare
Referee: Teklu Mogos (Eritrea)
17 November 2026
16:00 UTC+0

Sierra Leone	1–1	DR Congo
Conteh 90+4'	Report	Kadile 27'

Ben M'Hamed El Abdi Stadium, El Jadida (Morocco)
Referee: Jalal Jayed (Morocco)

24 March 2027

Equatorial Guinea	v	DR Congo
	Report

24 March 2027

Zimbabwe	v	Sierra Leone
	Report

28 March 2027

DR Congo	v	Zimbabwe
	Report

28 March 2027

Sierra Leone	v	Equatorial Guinea
	Report

== Goalscorers ==
There have been 20 goals scored in 8 matches, for an average of 2.5 goals per match (as of 17 November 2026).

3 goals

- (Democratic Republic of the Congo) Yoane Wissa
- (Zimbabwe) Marshall Munetsi

2 goals

- (Democratic Republic of the Congo) Samuel Moutoussamy
- (Sierra Leone) Alie Conteh
- (Zimbabwe) Tawanda Chirewa

1 goal

- (Democratic Republic of the Congo) Junior Kadile
- (Democratic Republic of the Congo) Edo Kayembe
- (Democratic Republic of the Congo) Chancel Mbemba
- (Equatorial Guinea) Loren Zúñiga
- (Sierra Leone) Samuel Bekoe
- (Sierra Leone) Sallieu Tarawallie
- (Zimbabwe) Tawanda Maswanhise
- (Zimbabwe) Thandolwenkosi Ngwenya
