= 2027 Africa Cup of Nations qualification preliminary round =

Tournament details
- Dates: 25–31 March 2026
- Teams: 12 (from 1 confederation)

Tournament statistics
- Matches played: 12
- Goals scored: 25 (2.08 per match)
- Top scorer(s): (Burundi) Bienvenue Kanakimana (Eritrea) Ali Sulieman (3 goals each)

The preliminary round of the 2027 Africa Cup of Nations qualification tournament was held from 25 to 31 March 2026. It was contested by the twelve 2027 Africa Cup of Nations qualification entrants (out of a total of 54 CAF member associations) with the lowest FIFA rankings. The winners advanced to the group stage of the qualification tournament.

The twelve teams were split into six ties which were played in home-and-away two-legged format. The six winners (Burundi, Eritrea, Ethiopia, Lesotho, Somalia and South Sudan) advanced to the group stage to join the 42 teams which entered directly.

== Draw ==
The preliminary round draw was held on 13 January 2026, 14:00 CAT (UTC+2) at the CAF headquarters in Cairo, Egypt. The twelve involved national teams were seeded into two pots of six based on the FIFA World Rankings from 19 November 2025 (shown in parentheses).

The teams in bold qualified for the qualifying group stage.

Pot 1	Pot 2
**Lesotho** (144); **Burundi** (145); **Ethiopia** (147); Eswatini (159); **South Sudan** (168); Mauritius (176)	Chad (177); São Tomé and Príncipe (190); Djibouti (196); **Somalia** (200); Seychelles (203); **Eritrea** (unranked)

== Matches ==
The first legs were played from 25 to 27 March, and the second legs were played on 29 and 31 March 2026.

Team 1	Agg.	Team 2	1st leg	2nd leg
Djibouti	1–4	South Sudan	0–4	1–0
Chad	0–8	Burundi	0–4	0–4
Somalia	0–0 (4–2 p)	Mauritius	0–0	0–0
Seychelles	1–2	Lesotho	0–0	1–2
Eritrea	4–1	Eswatini	2–0	2–1
São Tomé and Príncipe	0–4	Ethiopia	0–3	0–1

26 March 2026
15:00 UTC+2

Djibouti	0–4	South Sudan
	Report	Kuol 31'; Justin 49'; Maker 66'; Mangar 81'

Juba Stadium, Juba (South Sudan)
Attendance: 0 (Behind closed doors)
Referee: Tewodros Mitiku (Ethiopia)
29 March 2026
16:00 UTC+3

South Sudan	0–1	Djibouti
	Report	Akinbinu 77'

Juba Stadium, Juba
Attendance: 0 (Behind closed doors)
Referee: Retṧelisitsoe Molise (Lesotho)

South Sudan won 4–1 on aggregate.

27 March 2026
14:00 UTC+1

Chad	0–4	Burundi
	Report	Liongola 6'; Kanakimana 32'; Mpawenimana 63'; Girumugisha 74'

Stade Olympique Maréchal Idriss Déby Itno, N'Djamena
Referee: Ailton Carmelino (Angola)
31 March 2026
15:00 UTC+2

Burundi	4–0	Chad
Kanakimana 14', 22'; Girumugisha 71'; Mpawenimana 80'	Report

Intwari Stadium, Bujumbura
Referee: Jalal Jayed (Morocco)

Burundi won 8–0 on aggregate.

27 March 2026
15:00 UTC+2

Somalia	0–0	Mauritius
	Report

Arena Lalgy Tchumene, Maputo (Mozambique)
Referee: Kouassi Biro (Ivory Coast)
31 March 2026
19:00 UTC+4

Mauritius	0–0	Somalia
	Report
Penalties
Rose (penalty scored); Alizart (penalty missed); Ferré (penalty scored); Perticots (penalty missed)	2–4	(penalty scored) Awad; (penalty scored) Akram; (penalty scored) Sharif; (penalty scored) Suleiman

Côte d'Or National Sports Complex, Saint Pierre
Referee: Ali Brahamou Sadou (Niger)

0–0 on aggregate; Somalia won 4–2 on penalties.

26 March 2026
16:00 UTC+2

Seychelles	0–0	Lesotho
	Report

Toyota Stadium, Bloemfontein (South Africa)
Referee: William Oloya (Uganda)
29 March 2026
17:00 UTC+2

Lesotho	2–1	Seychelles
Lesako 50'; Motebang 82'	Report	Labrosse 45+2'

Toyota Stadium, Bloemfontein (South Africa)
Referee: Gerson Esono (Equatorial Guinea)

Lesotho won 2–1 on aggregate.

25 March 2026
17:00 UTC+1

Eritrea	2–0	Eswatini
Eyob-Abraha 81'; Sulieman 90+4'	Report

Stade d'Honneur, Meknès (Morocco)
Referee: Moussa Diou (Mauritania)
31 March 2026
16:00 UTC+2

Eswatini	1–2	Eritrea
Figuareido 90+6'	Report	Sulieman 50', 59'

Somhlolo National Stadium, Lobamba
Referee: Josefa Aurelio (São Tomé and Príncipe)

Eritrea won 4–1 on aggregate.

27 March 2026
17:00 UTC+1

São Tomé and Príncipe	0–3	Ethiopia
	Report	Markneh 23'; Yalew 32', 78'

Ben M'Hamed El Abdi Stadium, El Jadida (Morocco)
Referee: El Hadji Amadou Sy (Senegal)
31 March 2026
16:00 UTC+3

Ethiopia	1–0	São Tomé and Príncipe
Gugesa 7'	Report

Dire Dawa Stadium, Dire Dawa
Referee: Mohamed Marouf (Egypt)

Ethiopia won 4–0 on aggregate.

== Goalscorers ==
There were 25 goals scored in 12 matches, for an average of 2.08 goals per match.

3 goals

- (Burundi) Bienvenue Kanakimana
- (Eritrea) Ali Sulieman

2 goals

- (Burundi) Jean Claude Girumugisha
- (Burundi) Abdoul Karim Mpawenimana
- (Ethiopia) Abel Yalew

1 goal

- (Burundi) Jordi Liongola
- (Djibouti) Samuel Akinbinu
- (Eritrea) Siem Eyob-Abraha
- (Eswatini) Justice Figuareido
- (Ethiopia) Chernet Gugesa
- (Ethiopia) Kenean Markneh
- (Lesotho) Lebohang Lesako
- (Lesotho) Sera Motebang
- (Seychelles) Brandon Labrosse
- (South Sudan) Bangasi Justin
- (South Sudan) Teng Kuol
- (South Sudan) Peter Maker
- (South Sudan) Keer Mangar
