= 2027 Africa Cup of Nations qualification Group I =

2027 AFCON qualifying group I

Group I of the 2027 Africa Cup of Nations qualification is one of twelve groups that will decide the teams which will qualify for the 2027 Africa Cup of Nations final tournament in Kenya, Tanzania and Uganda. The group consists of four teams: Algeria, Zambia, Togo and Burundi.

The teams will play against each other in a home-and-away round-robin format between September 2026 and March 2027.

== Standings ==
Pos	Team	Pld	W	D	L	GF	GA	GD	Pts	Qualification	(Algeria)	(Togo)	(Zambia)	(Burundi)
1	Algeria	4	2	1	1	6	6	0	7	Final tournament	—	1–0	3–1	28 Mar
2	Togo	4	2	0	2	4	3	+1	6	Final tournament	3–0	—	28 Mar	1–0
3	Zambia	4	1	2	1	5	5	0	5		24 Mar	2–0	—	1–1
4	Burundi	4	0	3	1	4	5	−1	3		2–2	24 Mar	1–1	—

Updated to match(es) played on 17 November 2026. Source: CAF
Rules for classification: Tiebreakers

== Matches ==
25 September 2026
16:00 UTC+0

Togo	1–0	Burundi
Karim 17'	Report

Kégué Stadium, Lomé
Referee: Celso Alvação (Mozambique)
25 September 2026
20:00 UTC+1

Algeria	3–1	Zambia
Hadjam 2'; Maza 67'; Hadj Moussa 74'	Report	Sakala 57'

Hocine Aït Ahmed Stadium, Tizi Ouzou
Referee: Yannick Malala (DR Congo)

29 September 2026
15:00 UTC+2

Burundi	2–2	Algeria
Chaïbi 5' (o.g.); Girumugisha 12'	Report	Belloumi 30'; Boulbina 63'

Intwari Stadium, Bujumbura
Referee: Thabang Ketshabile (Botswana)
29 September 2026
18:00 UTC+2

Zambia	2–0	Togo
Kangwanda 2'; Mandanji 90+5'	Report

Levy Mwanawasa Stadium, Ndola
Referee: Mahmood Ismail (Sudan)

13 November 2026
15:00 UTC+2

Zambia	1–1	Burundi
Chilufya 65'	Report	Girumugisha 82'

Levy Mwanawasa Stadium, Ndola
Referee: Washington Dolo (Liberia)
14 November 2026
20:00 UTC+1

Algeria	1–0	Togo
Bensebaini 76'	Report

Hocine Aït Ahmed Stadium, Tizi Ouzou
Referee: Pierre Atcho (Gabon)

17 November 2026
14:00 UTC+2

Burundi	1–1	Zambia
Bimenyimana 78'	Report	Muderi 85' (o.g.)

Intwari Stadium, Bujumbura
Referee: Fabrício Duarte (Cape Verde)
17 November 2026
17:00 UTC+0

Togo	3–0	Algeria
Klidjé 18', 32'; Boateng 38'	Report

Kégué Stadium, Lomé
Referee: Jean-Pierre Nguiene (Congo)

24 March 2027

Burundi	v	Togo
	Report

24 March 2027

Zambia	v	Algeria
	Report

28 March 2027

Algeria	v	Burundi
	Report

28 March 2027

Togo	v	Zambia
	Report

== Goalscorers ==
There have been 19 goals scored in 8 matches, for an average of 2.38 goals per match (as of 17 November 2026).

2 goals

- (Burundi) Jean Claude Girumugisha
- (Togo) Thibault Klidjé

1 goal

- (Algeria) Mohamed Belloumi
- (Algeria) Ramy Bensebaini
- (Algeria) Adil Boulbina
- (Algeria) Anis Hadj Moussa
- (Algeria) Jaouen Hadjam
- (Algeria) Ibrahim Maza
- (Burundi) Bonfils-Caleb Bimenyimana
- (Togo) Kennedy Boateng
- (Togo) Dermane Karim
- (Zambia) Edward Chilufya
- (Zambia) Albert Kangwanda
- (Zambia) Eliya Mandanji
- (Zambia) Fashion Sakala

1 own goal

- (Algeria) Farès Chaïbi (against Burundi)
- (Burundi) Akbar Muderi (against Zambia)
