= 2027 Africa Cup of Nations qualification Group H =

2027 AFCON qualifying group H

Group H of the 2027 Africa Cup of Nations qualification is one of twelve groups that will decide the teams which will qualify for the 2027 Africa Cup of Nations final tournament in Kenya, Tanzania and Uganda. The group consists of four teams: Tunisia, finals co-hosts Uganda, Libya and Botswana.

The teams will play against each other in a home-and-away round-robin format between September 2026 and March 2027.

== Standings ==
Pos	Team	Pld	W	D	L	GF	GA	GD	Pts	Qualification	(Uganda)	(Libya)	(Botswana)	(Tunisia)
1	Uganda (Note: Uganda has already qualified for the final tournament as a host nation.) (Q)	4	1	3	0	3	2	+1	6	Final tournament	—	1–0	1–1	24 Mar
2	Libya	4	1	2	1	6	5	+1	5	Final tournament	28 Mar	—	2–2	1–1
3	Botswana	4	0	4	0	5	5	0	4		17 Nov	24 Mar	—	28 Mar
4	Tunisia	4	0	3	1	5	7	−2	3		1–1	0–2	2–2	—

Updated to match(es) played on 17 November 2026. Source: CAF
Rules for classification: Tiebreakers
(Q) Qualified for the phase indicated

== Matches ==
24 September 2026
15:00 UTC+0

Libya	2–2	Botswana
Alhibeeshi 87'; El Maremi 90+6' (pen.)	Report	Orebonye 30', 42'

Tripoli Stadium, Tripoli
Referee: Jean Pierre Nguiene Bissila (Congo)
24 September 2026
21:00 UTC+0

Tunisia	1–1	Uganda
Arous 12'	Report	Mato 68'

Hammadi Agrebi Stadium, Radès
Referee: Abdelaziz Mohamed Bouh (Mauritania)

28 September 2026
21:00 UTC+0

Tunisia	2–2	Botswana
Mastouri 44', 49'	Report	Kgamanyane 37'; Ditsele 60'

Hammadi Agrebi Stadium, Radès
Referee: Ahmed Arajiga (Tanzania)
29 September 2026
18:00 UTC+0

Uganda	1–0	Libya
Vula 45+2'	Report

Hoima City Stadium, Hoima
Referee: Naby Laye Touré (Guinea)

13 November 2026
17:00 UTC+1

Tunisia	0–2	Libya
	Report	Youssef 44' (pen.); Elhouni 62'

Taieb Mhiri Stadium, Sfax
Referee: Hamza El Fariq (Morocco)
14 November 2026
17:00 UTC+0

Uganda	1–1	Botswana
Bogere 8'	Report	Ratshukudu 31'

Hoima City Stadium, Hoima
Referee: Daouda Guèye (Senegal)

17 November 2026
18:00 UTC+2

Libya	1–1	Tunisia
El Maremi 45+5' (pen.)	Report	Ben Slimane 3'

Tripoli Stadium, Tripoli
Attendance: 0 (Behind closed doors)
Referee: Raphiou Ligali (Benin)
17 November 2026
21:00 UTC+2

Botswana	1–1	Uganda
Tauyatswala 74'	Report	Kopelang 86' (o.g.)

Botswana National Stadium, Gaborone
Referee: Joseph Ogabor (Nigeria)

24 March 2027

Botswana	v	Libya
	Report

24 March 2027

Uganda	v	Tunisia
	Report

28 March 2027

Libya	v	Uganda
	Report

28 March 2027

Botswana	v	Tunisia
	Report

== Goalscorers ==
There have been 19 goals scored in 8 matches, for an average of 2.38 goals per match (as of 17 November 2026).

2 goals

- (Botswana) Tumisang Orebonye
- (Libya) Ezoo El Maremi
- (Tunisia) Hazem Mastouri

1 goal

- (Botswana) Lebogang Ditsele
- (Botswana) Thatayaone Kgamanyane
- (Botswana) Losika Ratshukudu
- (Botswana) Godfrey Tauyatswala
- (Libya) Maruwan Alhibeeshi
- (Libya) Hamdou Elhouni
- (Libya) Ali Youssef
- (Tunisia) Adem Arous
- (Tunisia) Anis Ben Slimane
- (Uganda) James Bogere
- (Uganda) Rogers Mato
- (Uganda) Arnold Vula

1 own goal

- (Botswana) Tebogo Kopelang (against Uganda)
