= 2027 Africa Cup of Nations qualification Group B =

2027 AFCON qualifying group B

Group B of the 2027 Africa Cup of Nations qualification is one of twelve groups that will decide the teams which will qualify for the 2027 Africa Cup of Nations final tournament in Kenya, Tanzania and Uganda. The group consists of four teams: Egypt, Angola, Malawi and South Sudan.

The teams will play against each other in a home-and-away round-robin format between September 2026 and March 2027.

== Standings ==
Pos	Team	Pld	W	D	L	GF	GA	GD	Pts	Qualification	(Angola)	(Egypt)	(Malawi)	(South Sudan)
1	Angola	4	3	1	0	6	1	+5	10	Final tournament	—	24 Mar	3–1	2–0
2	Egypt	4	2	2	0	10	0	+10	8	Final tournament	0–0	—	5–0	28 Mar
3	Malawi	4	1	1	2	3	9	−6	4		28 Mar	0–0	—	2–1
4	South Sudan (E)	4	0	0	4	1	10	−9	0		0–1	0–5	24 Mar	—

Updated to match(es) played on 17 November 2026. Source: CAF
Rules for classification: Tiebreakers
(E) Eliminated

== Matches ==
All kick-off times are local.

25 September 2026
18:00 UTC+2

Malawi	2–1	South Sudan
Adepoju 20'; Njaliwa 64'	Report	Dhata 48'

Bingu National Stadium, Lilongwe
Referee: Vincent Kaboré (Burkina Faso)
25 September 2026
22:00 UTC+3

Egypt	0–0	Angola
	Report

Cairo International Stadium, Cairo
Referee: Peter Waweru (Kenya)

29 September 2026
15:00 UTC+2

South Sudan	0–5	Egypt
	Report	Ziko 36'; Marmoush 49', 83'; Adel 75'; Abdelkarim 90+2'

Juba Stadium, Juba
Referee: Ahmad Imtehaz Heeralall (Mauritius)
6 October 2026
20:00 UTC+1

Angola	3–1	Malawi
Milson 3'; Mabululu 38'; Miro 70'	Report	Gaspar 45+2' (o.g.)

11 November Stadium, Talatona
Referee: Gerson Adolfo Micó Esono Angono (Equatorial Guinea)

13 November 2026
21:00 UTC+2

Egypt	5–0	Malawi
Maher 6'; Marmoush 10'; Hany 39'; Salah 84', 90+5' (pen.)	Report

Cairo International Stadium, Cairo
Referee: Abdelaziz Mohamed Bouh (Mauritania)
14 November 2026
20:00 UTC+1

Angola	2–0	South Sudan
Banza 90+2'; Miro 90+8'	Report

11 November Stadium, Talatona
Referee: Yannick Malala (Congo DR)

17 November 2026
14:00 UTC+2

South Sudan	0–1	Angola
	Report	Miro 45+1'

Juba Stadium, Juba
Referee: Boubou Traoré (Mali)
17 November 2026
14:00 UTC+2

Malawi	0–0	Egypt
	Report

Bingu National Stadium, Lilongwe
Referee: Lucky Razake Kasalirwe (Uganda)

24 March 2027

Angola	v	Egypt
	Report

24 March 2027

South Sudan	v	Malawi
	Report

28 March 2027

Egypt	v	South Sudan
	Report

28 March 2027

Malawi	v	Angola
	Report

== Goalscorers ==
There have been 20 goals scored in 8 matches, for an average of 2.5 goals per match (as of 17 November 2026).

3 goals

- (Angola) Miro
- (Egypt) Omar Marmoush

2 goals

- (Egypt) Mohamed Salah

1 goal

- (Angola) Chico Banza
- (Angola) Mabululu
- (Angola) Felício Milson
- (Egypt) Hamza Abdelkarim
- (Egypt) Ibrahim Adel
- (Egypt) Mohamed Hany
- (Egypt) Nasser Maher
- (Egypt) Mostafa Ziko
- (Malawi) Babatunde Adepoju
- (Malawi) Lloyd Njaliwa
- (South Sudan) Joseph Dhata

1 own goal

- (Angola) Kialonda Gaspar (against Malawi)
