= 2027 Africa Cup of Nations qualification Group C =

2027 AFCON qualifying group C

Group C of the 2027 Africa Cup of Nations qualification is one of twelve groups that will decide the teams which will qualify for the 2027 Africa Cup of Nations final tournament in Kenya, Tanzania and Uganda. The group consists of four teams: Ivory Coast, Ghana, Gambia and Somalia.

The teams will play against each other in a home-and-away round-robin format between September 2026 and March 2027.

== Standings ==
| Pos | Team | Pld | W | D | L | GF | GA | GD | Pts | Qualification | (Ivory Coast) | (The Gambia) | (Ghana) | (Somalia) |
|---|---|---|---|---|---|---|---|---|---|---|---|---|---|---|
| 1 | Ivory Coast | 4 | 3 | 1 | 0 | 8 | 3 | +5 | 10 | Final tournament | — | 2–1 | 2–0 | 28 Mar |
| 2 | Gambia | 4 | 2 | 1 | 1 | 9 | 7 | +2 | 7 | Final tournament | 17 Nov | — | 28 Mar | 2–1 |
| 3 | Ghana | 4 | 2 | 0 | 2 | 5 | 6 | −1 | 6 | | 24 Mar | 2–4 | — | 2–0 |
| 4 | Somalia (E) | 4 | 0 | 0 | 4 | 1 | 7 | −6 | 0 | | 0–2 | 24 Mar | 0–1 | — |

Updated to match(es) played on 17 November 2026. Source: CAF
Rules for classification: Tiebreakers
(E) Eliminated

== Matches ==
All kick-off times are local.

24 September 2026
19:00 UTC+0

| Ivory Coast | 2–0 | Ghana |
|---|---|---|
| Yalcouyé 44'; Kessié 58' (pen.) | Report |

Bouaké Stadium, Bouaké
Referee: Mustapha Ghorbal (Algeria)
25 September 2026
16:00 UTC+0

| Gambia | 2–1 | Somalia |
|---|---|---|
| E. Colley 18' (pen.); Badamosi 83' | Report | B. Njie 72' |

Independence Stadium, Bakau
Referee: Andofetra Rakotojaona (Madagascar)

29 September 2026
16:00 UTC+0

| Ghana | 2–4 | Gambia |
|---|---|---|
| Nuamah 27' (pen.); Afena-Gyan 33' | Report | Badamosi 37' (pen.); O. Colley 42'; E. Colley 68', 90+1' |

Accra Sports Stadium, Accra
Referee: Mustapha Kechchaf (Morocco)
29 September 2026
19:00 UTC+0

| Somalia | 0–2 | Ivory Coast |
|---|---|---|
| | Report | Gboho 89'; Touré 90+5' |

Accra Sports Stadium, Accra (Ghana)
Referee: David Chinoko (Malawi)

12 November 2026
15:00 UTC+0

| Ghana | 2–0 | Somalia |
|---|---|---|
| Adjetey 45+2'; Afena-Gyan 62' | Report |

Sekondi-Takoradi Stadium, Essipong
Referee: André Kolissala (Central African Republic)
12 November 2026
19:00 UTC+0

| Ivory Coast | 2–1 | Gambia |
|---|---|---|
| Yalcouyé 17'; Wahi 24' | Report | Barrow 38' |

Bouaké Stadium, Bouaké
Referee: Abdou Abdel Mefire (Cameroon)

16 November 2026
15:00 UTC+0

| Somalia | 0–1 | Ghana |
|---|---|---|
| | Report | Ayew 36' (pen.) |

Sekondi-Takoradi Stadium, Essipong (Ghana)
Referee: Mweshitsama Naftal (Namibia)
17 November 2026
16:00 UTC+0

| Gambia | 2–2 | Ivory Coast |
|---|---|---|
| Minteh 69'; Barrow 80' (pen.) | Report | Zogbé 13'; Inao Oulaï 90+8' |

Independence Stadium, Bakau
Referee: Mehrez Melki (Tunisia)

24 March 2027

| Ghana | v | Ivory Coast |
|---|---|---|
| | Report |

24 March 2027

| Somalia | v | Gambia |
|---|---|---|
| | Report |

28 March 2027

| Gambia | v | Ghana |
|---|---|---|
| | Report |

28 March 2027

| Ivory Coast | v | Somalia |
|---|---|---|
| | Report |

== Goalscorers ==
There have been 23 goals scored in 8 matches, for an average of 2.88 goals per match (as of 17 November 2026).

3 goals

- (The Gambia) Ebrima Colley

2 goals

- (The Gambia) Muhammed Badamosi
- (The Gambia) Musa Barrow
- (Ghana) Felix Afena-Gyan
- (Ivory Coast) Malick Yalcouyé

1 goal

- (The Gambia) Omar Colley
- (The Gambia) Yankuba Minteh
- (Ghana) Jordan Ayew
- (Ghana) Jonas Adjetey
- (Ghana) Ernest Nuamah
- (Ivory Coast) Yann Gboho
- (Ivory Coast) Christ Inao Oulaï
- (Ivory Coast) Franck Kessié
- (Ivory Coast) Bazoumana Touré
- (Ivory Coast) Elye Wahi
- (Ivory Coast) Luck Zogbé
- (Somalia) Bilal Njie
