= Ayoub Oufkir =

Dutch footballer (born 2006)

Personal information
- Date of birth: 4 January 2006 (age 20)
- Place of birth: Rotterdam, Netherlands
- Height: 1.70 m (5 ft 7 in)
- Position: Winger

Team information
- Current team: AZ
- Number: 24

Youth career
- 2010–2013: De Betrokken Spartaan
- 2013–2024: Sparta Rotterdam

Senior career*
Years	Team	Apps	(Gls)
2023–2025	Jong Sparta	27	(9)
2024–2025	Sparta Rotterdam	22	(1)
2026–	AZ	18	(2)
2026–	Jong AZ	8	(3)

International career^{‡}
2024–2025	Netherlands U19	14	(7)
2025–2026	Netherlands U21	4	(2)
2026–	Morocco	1	(1)
Medal record
Men's football
Representing Netherlands
UEFA European Under-19 Championship
Winner	2025 Romania
- * Club domestic league appearances and goals as of 25 October 2026 ‡ National team caps and goals as of 19:21, 13 November 2026 (UTC)

Ayoub Oufkir (born 4 January 2006) is a professional footballer who plays as a winger for Eredivisie club AZ. Born in the Netherlands, he plays for the Morocco national team.

== Club career ==
Oufkir is a youth product of De Betrokken Spartaan and Sparta Rotterdam. In 2023, he was promoted to Sparta's reserves in the Tweede Divisie. On 16 August 2024, he signed his first professional contract with Sparta until 2027. On 17 August 2024, he made his senior debut with Sparta Rotterdam in a 1–1 Eredivisie tie with FC Twente.

On 16 December 2025, Oufkir signed a four-and-a-half-year contract with AZ starting January 2026, with the agreement running until June 2030 and including an option for a further year.

== International career ==
Born in the Netherlands, Oufkir is of Moroccan descent. He was part of the Netherlands U19s that won the 2025 UEFA European Under-19 Championship.

In November 2025, Oufkir received his first call-up for the Netherlands U21 team alongside Sparta teammate Marvin Young.

On 4 November 2026, Oufkir received his first call-up to the Morocco senior national team under head coach Mohamed Ouahbi. The 20-year-old winger, who had previously represented the Netherlands at under-21 level, was included in Morocco's 26-man squad for the 2027 Africa Cup of Nations qualifiers against Niger in November 2026.

== Career statistics ==
=== Club ===
As of match played 25 October 2026

Appearances and goals by club, season and competition
Club	Season	League			KNVB Cup		Europe		Other		Total	
Club	Season	Division	Apps	Goals	Apps	Goals	Apps	Goals	Apps	Goals	Apps	Goals
Jong Sparta	2023–24	Tweede Divisie	15	0	—		—		—		15	0
Jong Sparta	2024–25	Tweede Divisie	12	9	—		—		2 (Note: Appearances in Tweede Divisie play-offs)	0	14	9
Jong Sparta	Total		27	9	—		—		2	0	29	9
Sparta Rotterdam	2024–25	Eredivisie	6	0	2	1	—		—		8	1
Sparta Rotterdam	2025–26	Eredivisie	16	1	2	2	—		—		18	3
Sparta Rotterdam	Total		22	1	4	3	—		—		26	4
AZ	2025–26	Eredivisie	8	0	1	0	3 (Note: Appearance in UEFA Conference League)	0	—		12	0
AZ	2026–27	Eredivisie	10	2	0	0	3 (Note: Appearances in UEFA Europa League)	0	—		13	2
AZ	Total		18	2	1	0	6	0	—		25	2
Jong AZ	2025–26	Eerste Divisie	5	1	—		—		—		5	1
Jong AZ	2026–27	Eerste Divisie	2	2	—		—		—		2	2
Jong AZ	Total		7	3	—		—		—		7	3
Career total			76	15	5	3	6	0	2	0	87	18

=== International ===
As of match played 13 November 2026

Appearances and goals by national team and year
National team	Year	Apps	Goals
Morocco	2026	1	1
Total		1	1

Scores and results list Morocco's goal tally first, score column indicates score after each Oufkir goal.

List of international goals scored by Ayoub Oufkir
No.	Date	Venue	Opponent	Score	Result	Competition
1	13 November 2026	Stade Mohammed V, Casablanca, Morocco	Niger	5–1	5–1	2027 Africa Cup of Nations qualification

== Honours ==
AZ

- KNVB Cup: 2025–26
- Johan Cruyff Shield: 2026

Netherlands U19

- UEFA European Under-19 Championship: 2025
