= 2027 Africa Cup of Nations qualification Group J =

2027 AFCON qualifying group J

Group J of the 2027 Africa Cup of Nations qualification is one of twelve groups that will decide the teams which will qualify for the 2027 Africa Cup of Nations final tournament in Kenya, Tanzania and Uganda. The group consists of four teams: Senegal, Mozambique, Sudan and Ethiopia.

The teams will play against each other in a home-and-away round-robin format between September 2026 and March 2027.

== Standings ==
Pos	Team	Pld	W	D	L	GF	GA	GD	Pts	Qualification	(Senegal)	(Mozambique)	(Sudan)	(Ethiopia)
1	Senegal (Q)	4	3	1	0	10	4	+6	10	Final tournament	—	24 Mar	4–1	28 Mar
2	Mozambique	4	2	1	1	6	3	+3	7	Final tournament	1–1	—	4–1	0–1
3	Sudan	4	1	0	3	5	12	−7	3		2–4	28 Mar	—	1–0
4	Ethiopia	4	1	0	3	1	3	−2	3		0–1	0–1	24 Mar	—

Updated to match(es) played on 17 November 2026. Source: CAF
Rules for classification: Tiebreakers
(Q) Qualified for the phase indicated

== Matches ==
25 September 2026
15:00 UTC+2

Mozambique	1–1	Senegal
Catamo 45+2'	Report	Jackson 32'

Zimpeto Stadium, Maputo
Referee: Mutaz Ibrahim (Libya)
25 September 2026
15:00 UTC+2

Sudan	1–0	Ethiopia
Eisa 86'	Report

Juba Stadium, Juba (South Sudan)
Referee: Washington Dolo (Liberia)

29 September 2026
16:00 UTC+3

Ethiopia	0–1	Senegal
	Report	Mbaye 11'

Bahir Dar Stadium, Bahir Dar
Referee: Willy Stéphane Ngah (Cameroon)
29 September 2026
15:00 UTC+2

Mozambique	4–1	Sudan
Witi 24'; Chamito 46', 62'; Guima 58'	Report	Hamed 88' (pen.)

Zimpeto Stadium, Maputo
Referee: Sulaiman Kamara (Sierra Leone)

12 November 2026
19:00 UTC+0

Senegal	4–1	Sudan
Jackson 31'; Dia 61'; Mbaye 64'; Mboup 86'	Report	Abdalla 45'

Léopold Sédar Senghor Stadium, Dakar
Referee: Abongile Tom (South Africa)
13 November 2026
14:00 UTC+2

Mozambique	0–1	Ethiopia
	Report	Markneh 87'

Zimpeto Stadium, Maputo
Referee: Arima Akakpo (Togo)

16 November 2026
15:00 UTC+2

Sudan	2–4	Senegal
Nouh 52'; Adel 75'	Report	Jackson 4'; Diouf 22'; Mboup 87'; Mendy 90+1'

Juba Stadium, Juba (South Sudan)
Referee: Hillary Hambaba (Zambia)
17 November 2026
14:00 UTC+3

Ethiopia	0–1	Mozambique
	Report	Ratifo 38'

Bahir Dar Stadium, Bahir Dar
Referee: Lamin Jammeh (Gambia)

24 March 2027

Ethiopia	v	Sudan
	Report

24 March 2027

Senegal	v	Mozambique
	Report

28 March 2027

Senegal	v	Ethiopia
	Report

28 March 2027

Sudan	v	Mozambique
	Report

== Goalscorers ==
There have been 22 goals scored in 8 matches, for an average of 2.75 goals per match (as of 17 November 2026).

3 goals

- (Senegal) Nicolas Jackson

2 goals

- (Mozambique) Chamito
- (Senegal) Ibrahim Mbaye
- (Senegal) Pathé Mboup

1 goal

- (Ethiopia) Kenean Markneh
- (Mozambique) Geny Catamo
- (Mozambique) Guima
- (Mozambique) Stanley Ratifo
- (Mozambique) Witi
- (Senegal) Boulaye Dia
- (Senegal) El Hadji Malick Diouf
- (Senegal) Paul Mendy
- (Sudan) Abuaagla Abdalla
- (Sudan) Salah Adel
- (Sudan) Mohamed Eisa
- (Sudan) Yasin Hamed
- (Sudan) Al-Jezoli Nouh
