= Malick Yalcouyé =

Ivorian footballer (born 2005)

Personal information
- Full name: Malick Junior Yalcouyé
- Date of birth: 18 November 2005 (age 21)
- Place of birth: Bandiagara, Mali
- Height: 1.69 m (5 ft 7 in)
- Position: Midfielder

Team information
- Current team: Brighton & Hove Albion
- Number: 35

Youth career
- Étoiles De Sahel Abobo
- –2023: ASEC Mimosas

Senior career*
Years	Team	Apps	(Gls)
2023	ASEC Mimosas	11	(2)
2024	IFK Göteborg	11	(1)
2024–	Brighton & Hove Albion	10	(2)
2024–2025	→ Sturm Graz (loan)	26	(4)
2025–2026	→ Swansea City (loan)	33	(1)

International career^{‡}
2025	Ivory Coast U23	1	(0)
2026	Ivory Coast U20	5	(0)
2026–	Ivory Coast	5	(2)
- * Club domestic league appearances and goals as of 8 November 2026 ‡ National team caps and goals as of 17 November 2026

Malick Junior Yalcouyé (born 18 November 2005) is a professional footballer who plays as a midfielder for Premier League club Brighton & Hove Albion. Born in Mali, he represents the Ivory Coast national team.

== Club career ==
=== Early career ===
Yalcouyé came through the academy at Center De Formation Étoiles De Sahel Abobo. He then played for ASEC Mimosas. Yalcouyé made his debut in the CAF Champions League for ASEC Mimosas against Coton FC on 20 August 2023.

He joined IFK Göteborg from ASEC Mimosas in the 2023–24 winter transfer window, agreeing to a contact until 31 December 2028. He made his competitive debut for the club against Nordic United FC in 2023–24 Svenska Cupen on 18 February 2024. He made his debut in Allsvenskan against Djurgårdens IF on 1 April 2024. He scored his first league goal for the club on 29 April 2024 against IF Brommapojkarna.

=== Brighton & Hove Albion ===
On 12 July 2024, Yalcouyé joined Premier League club Brighton & Hove Albion, signing a contract until June 2029. In August 2024, he joined Austrian Bundesliga club Sturm Graz on a season-long loan deal. On 14 August 2025, Yalcouyé joined EFL Championship club Swansea City on a season-long loan.

Following his return to Brighton, Yalcouyé scored his first Premier League goal in a 4–3 away defeat against Chelsea on 30 August 2026.

== International career ==
Born in Mali and raised in Ivory Coast, Yalcouyé holds dual Ivorian and Malian citizenship. He is eligible to represent Ivory Coast, through having been raised there. On 27 May 2025, he was called up to the Ivory Coast U23s for a friendly. He debuted with the Ivory Coast U23s in a friendly 3–0 loss to the Netherlands U23s on 6 June 2025. In September 2026, Yalcouyé received his first call-up to the Ivory Coast senior squad, ahead of 2027 Africa Cup of Nations qualification matches against Ghana and Somalia.

== Career statistics ==
=== Club ===
As of match played 8 November 2026

Appearances and goals by club, season and competition
Club	Season	League			National cup (Note: Includes Swedish Cup, Austrian Cup, FA Cup)		League cup (Note: Includes EFL Cup)		Continental		Other		Total	
Club	Season	Division	Apps	Goals	Apps	Goals	Apps	Goals	Apps	Goals	Apps	Goals	Apps	Goals
ASEC Mimosas	2023–24	Ivorian Ligue 1	11	2	—		—		1 (Note: Appearance in CAF Champions League)	0	—		12	2
IFK Göteborg	2024	Allsvenskan	11	1	3	0	—		—		—		14	1
Brighton & Hove Albion	2024–25	Premier League	0	0	—		0	0	—		—		0	0
Brighton & Hove Albion	2026–27	Premier League	10	2	0	0	2	1	5 (Note: Appearances in UEFA Conference League)	1	—		17	4
Brighton & Hove Albion	Total		10	2	0	0	2	1	5	1	—		17	4
Brighton & Hove Albion U21	2024–25	—			—		—		—		1 (Note: Appearance in EFL Trophy)	0	1	0
Sturm Graz (loan)	2024–25	Austrian Bundesliga	26	4	2	0	—		8 (Note: Appearances in UEFA Champions League)	0	—		36	4
Swansea City (loan)	2025–26	Championship	33	1	1	0	2	0	—		—		36	1
Career total			91	10	6	0	4	1	14	1	1	0	116	12

=== International ===
As of match played 17 November 2026

Appearances and goals by national team and year
National team	Year	Apps	Goals
Ivory Coast	2026	5	2
Total		5	2

Scores and results list Ivory Coast's goal tally first.

International goals by date, venue, opponent, score, result and competition
No.	Date	Venue	Opponent	Score	Result	Competition
1	24 September 2026	Bouaké Stadium, Bouaké, Ivory Coast	Ghana	1–0	2–0	2027 Africa Cup of Nations qualification
2	12 November 2026	Bouaké Stadium, Bouaké, Ivory Coast	Gambia	1–0	2–1	2027 Africa Cup of Nations qualification

== Honours ==
Sturm Graz

- Austrian Bundesliga: 2024–25

Individual

- Austrian Bundesliga Newcomer of the Season: 2024–25
- Austrian Bundesliga Team of the Season: 2024–25
