= 2027 Africa Cup of Nations qualification Group G =

2027 AFCON qualifying group G

Group G of the 2027 Africa Cup of Nations qualification is one of twelve groups that will decide the teams which will qualify for the 2027 Africa Cup of Nations final tournament in Kenya, Tanzania and Uganda. The group consists of four teams: Namibia, Cameroon, Congo and Comoros.

The teams will play against each other in a home-and-away round-robin format between September 2026 and March 2027.

== Standings ==
| Pos | Team | Pld | W | D | L | GF | GA | GD | Pts | Qualification | (Cameroon) | (Comoros) | (Namibia) | (Republic of the Congo) |
|---|---|---|---|---|---|---|---|---|---|---|---|---|---|---|
| 1 | Cameroon (Q) | 4 | 3 | 1 | 0 | 9 | 2 | +7 | 10 | Final tournament | — | 3–1 | 2–0 | 28 Mar |
| 2 | Comoros | 4 | 2 | 1 | 1 | 3 | 3 | 0 | 7 | Final tournament | 24 Mar | — | 1–0 | 0–0 |
| 3 | Namibia | 4 | 1 | 0 | 3 | 1 | 6 | −5 | 3 | | 0–3 | 28 Mar | — | 1–0 |
| 4 | Congo | 4 | 0 | 2 | 2 | 1 | 3 | −2 | 2 | | 1–1 | 0–1 | 24 Mar | — |

Updated to match(es) played on 17 November 2026. Source: CAF
Rules for classification: Tiebreakers
(Q) Qualified for the phase indicated

== Matches ==
24 September 2026
15:00 UTC+0

| Namibia | 1–0 | Congo |
|---|---|---|
| Muzeu 47' | Report |

Botswana National Stadium, Gaborone (Botswana)
Referee: Mehrez Melki (Tunisia)
24 September 2026
21:00 UTC+0

| Cameroon | 3–1 | Comoros |
|---|---|---|
| Nyengue 39'; Mbeumo 48'; Namaso 81' | Report | Omari 51' |

Roumdé Adjia Stadium, Garoua
Attendance: 30,000
Referee: Abdulsalam Abiola Kasim (Nigeria)

29 September 2026
13:00 UTC+0

| Comoros | 1–0 | Namibia |
|---|---|---|
| B. Youssouf 53' | Report |

Stade Omnisports de Malouzini, Iconi
Referee: Samuel Uwikunda (Rwanda)
29 September 2026
21:00 UTC+0

| Congo | 1–1 | Cameroon |
|---|---|---|
| Bantsiele 24' | Report | Zinga 53' (o.g.) |

Stade Alphonse Massemba-Débat, Brazzaville
Referee: Clément Franklin Kpan (Ivory Coast)

12 November 2026
20:00 UTC+1

| Cameroon | 2–0 | Namibia |
|---|---|---|
| Alioum 16'; Nsongo 29' | Report |

Japoma Stadium, Douala
Attendance: 50,000
Referee: Mahmood Ismail (Sudan)
13 November 2026
14:00 UTC+0

| Comoros | 0–0 | Congo |
|---|---|---|
| | Report |

Stade Omnisports de Malouzini, Iconi
Referee: Issa Sy (Senegal)

16 November 2026
14:00 UTC+0

| Namibia | 0–3 | Cameroon |
|---|---|---|
| | Report | Nagida 12'; Fosso 58'; Alioum 71' |

Botswana National Stadium, Gaborone (Botswana)
Referee: Amin Omar (Egypt)
17 November 2026
20:00 UTC+0

| Congo | 0–1 | Comoros |
|---|---|---|
| | Report | Hamada 32' |

Stade Alphonse Massemba-Débat, Brazzaville
Referee: Ali Brahamou Sadou (Niger)

24 March 2027

| Congo | v | Namibia |
|---|---|---|
| | Report |

24 March 2027

| Comoros | v | Cameroon |
|---|---|---|
| | Report |

28 March 2027

| Cameroon | v | Congo |
|---|---|---|
| | Report |

28 March 2027

| Namibia | v | Comoros |
|---|---|---|
| | Report |

== Goalscorers ==
There have been 14 goals scored in 8 matches, for an average of 1.75 goals per match (as of 17 November 2026).

2 goals

- (Cameroon) Saidou Alioum

1 goal

- (Cameroon) Ryan Fosso
- (Cameroon) Bryan Mbeumo
- (Cameroon) Danny Namaso
- (Cameroon) Aboubakar Nagida
- (Cameroon) Bil Nsongo
- (Cameroon) David Nyengue
- (Comoros) Ben-Chayeel Hamada
- (Comoros) Warmed Omari
- (Comoros) Benjaloud Youssouf
- (Republic of the Congo) Geltany Stalgout Bantsiele
- (Namibia) Bethuel Muzeu

1 own goal

- (Republic of the Congo) Melvin Zinga (against Cameroon)
