= 2027 Africa Cup of Nations qualification Group A =

2027 AFCON qualifying group A

Group A of the 2027 Africa Cup of Nations qualification is one of twelve groups that will decide the teams which will qualify for the 2027 Africa Cup of Nations final tournament in Kenya, Tanzania and Uganda. The group consists of four teams: defending champions Morocco, Gabon, Niger and Lesotho.

The teams will play against each other in a home-and-away round-robin format between September 2026 and March 2027.

== Standings ==
Pos	Team	Pld	W	D	L	GF	GA	GD	Pts	Qualification	(Morocco)	(Gabon)	(Lesotho)	(Niger)
1	Morocco (Q)	4	4	0	0	10	1	+9	12	Final tournament	—	2–0	28 Mar	5–1
2	Gabon	4	2	0	2	5	4	+1	6	Final tournament	24 Mar	—	2–0	2–0
3	Lesotho	4	1	0	3	3	7	−4	3		0–2	2–1	—	24 Mar
4	Niger	4	1	0	3	3	9	−6	3		0–1	28 Mar	2–1	—

Updated to match(es) played on 17 November 2026. Source: CAF
Rules for classification: Tiebreakers
(Q) Qualified for the phase indicated

== Matches ==
All kick-off times are local.

25 September 2026
15:00 UTC+0

Niger	2–1	Lesotho
Sosah 38'; Sako 45'	Report	Motebang 85' (pen.)

Accra Sports Stadium, Accra (Ghana)
Referee: Fabricio Duarte (Cape Verde)
25 September 2026
19:00 UTC+0

Morocco	2–0	Gabon
Mazraoui 36'; Rahimi 84'	Report

Prince Moulay Abdellah Stadium, Rabat
Referee: Abongile Tom (South Africa)

29 September 2026
15:00 UTC+2

Lesotho	0–2	Morocco
	Report	Brahim 45'; Ounahi 82'

Free State Stadium, Bloemfontein (South Africa)
Referee: Abdou Abdel Mefire (Cameroon)
29 September 2026
20:00 UTC+1

Gabon	2–0	Niger
Effaghe 53'; Bouanga 77'	Report

Franceville Stadium, Franceville
Referee: Issa Sy (Senegal)

13 November 2026
17:00 UTC+1

Gabon	2–0	Lesotho
Bouanga 65', 79' (pen.)	Report

Franceville Stadium, Franceville
Referee: Daniel Nii Laryea (Ghana)
13 November 2026
20:00 UTC+0

Morocco	5–1	Niger
Zabiri 4'; Hakimi 27', 45+3'; En-Nesyri 77'; Oufkir 90'	Report	Abdourahmane 41'

Stade Mohammed V, Casablanca
Referee: Omar Artan (Somalia)

17 November 2026
15:00 UTC+2

Lesotho	2–1	Gabon
Mkhwanazi 45+1'; Motebang 49'	Report	Do Marcolino 89'

Peter Mokaba Stadium, Polokwane (South Africa)
Referee: Sulaiman Kamara (Sierra Leone)
17 November 2026
20:00 UTC+0

Niger	0–1	Morocco
	Report	Ouazane 22'

Prince Moulay Abdellah Stadium, Rabat (Morocco)
Referee: Tewodros Mitiku (Ethiopia)

24 March 2027

Gabon	v	Morocco
	Report

24 March 2027

Lesotho	v	Niger
	Report

28 March 2027

Morocco	v	Lesotho
	Report

28 March 2027

Niger	v	Gabon
	Report

== Goalscorers ==
There have been 21 goals scored in 8 matches, for an average of 2.62 goals per match (as of 17 November 2026).

3 goals

- (Gabon) Denis Bouanga

2 goals

- (Lesotho) Sera Motebang
- (Morocco) Achraf Hakimi

1 goal

- (Gabon) Rody Junior Effaghe
- (Gabon) Alan Do Marcolino
- (Lesotho) Motlomelo Mkhwanazi
- (Morocco) Brahim Díaz
- (Morocco) Youssef En-Nesyri
- (Morocco) Noussair Mazraoui
- (Morocco) Abdellah Ouazane
- (Morocco) Ayoub Oufkir
- (Morocco) Azzedine Ounahi
- (Morocco) Soufiane Rahimi
- (Morocco) Yassir Zabiri
- (Niger) Mohamed Abdourahmane
- (Niger) Oumar Sako
- (Niger) Daniel Sosah
