= Miro (footballer) =

Angolan footballer (born 2003)

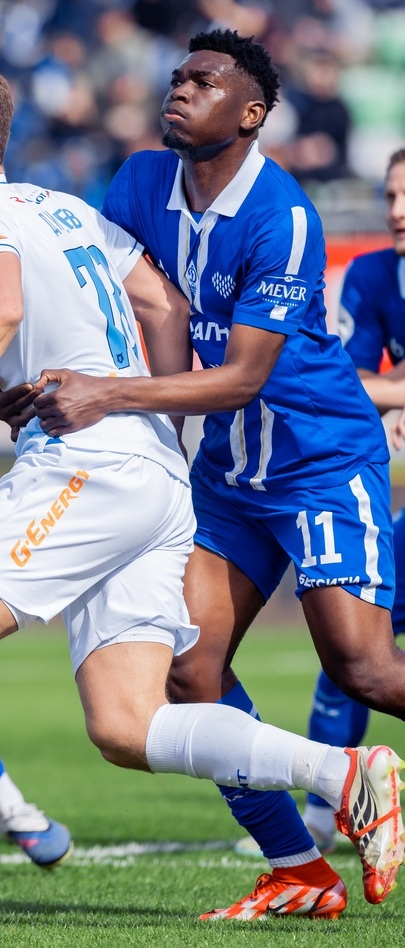
- Miro with Dynamo Makhachkala in 2026

Personal information
- Full name: Valdemiro Pinto Domingos
- Date of birth: 23 April 2003 (age 23)
- Place of birth: Luanda, Angola
- Height: 1.84 m (6 ft 1/2 in)
- Position: Centre-forward

Team information
- Current team: Dynamo Makhachkala
- Number: 11

Youth career
- –2021: ASA
- 2021–2023: Gil Vicente

Senior career*
Years	Team	Apps	(Gls)
2023–2024	Gil Vicente	5	(0)
2024–2025	Tondela	35	(10)
2025–	Dynamo Makhachkala	35	(3)

International career^{‡}
2024–	Angola	9	(4)
Medal record
Men's football
Representing Angola
COSAFA Cup
Winner	2024 South Africa
- * Club domestic league appearances and goals as of 22 November 2026 ‡ National team caps and goals as of 19:00, 17 November 2026 (UTC)

Valdemiro Pinto Domingos known as Miro (born 22 April 2003) is an Angolan professional footballer who plays as an attacker for Russian Premier League club Dynamo Makhachkala and the Angola national team.

== Club career ==
Valdemiro Pinto Domingos, better known as Miro left his country of Angola in 2020 to pursue a career as a professional footballer in Portugal having trained at Atlético Sport Aviação. He joined Gil Vicente and in 2021 played for their youth team. He scored 22 goals in 36 games in his first season for their youth team in the Liga Revelação.

He made his debut for Gil Vicente in the Taça da Liga on 22 July 2023 against U.D. Oliveirense. On 10 January 2024, he scored his first senior goal for the club in the Taça de Portugal against Amarante.

On 22 July 2024, Miro signed a three-year contract with Tondela.

On 11 September 2025, Miro moved to Dynamo Makhachkala in Russia on a four-season deal. On his league debut on 20 September 2025, Miro scored an added-time equalizer in a 1–1 draw against Lokomotiv Moscow.

== International career ==
He represented Angola at U16, U17, U20 and U23 level.

In March 2024, he was called up the senior Angola team for matches against Morocco and the Comoros.

== Career statistics ==
=== Club ===
As of 22 November 2026

Club	Season	League			Cup		Other		Total	
Club	Season	Division	Apps	Goals	Apps	Goals	Apps	Goals	Apps	Goals
Gil Vicente	2023–24	Primeira Liga	5	0	1	1	1 (Note: Appearance in Taça da Liga)	0	7	1
Tondela	2024–25	Liga Portugal 2	31	10	1	0	–		32	10
Tondela	2025–26	Primeira Liga	4	0	–		–		4	0
Tondela	Total		35	10	1	0	0	0	36	10
Dynamo Makhachkala	2025–26	Russian Premier League	20	1	5	0	2 (Note: Appearances in relegation play-offs)	1	27	2
Dynamo Makhachkala	2026–27	Russian Premier League	15	2	3	0	–		18	2
Dynamo Makhachkala	Total		35	3	8	0	2	1	45	4
Career total			75	13	10	1	3	1	88	15

=== International ===
As of match played 17 November 2026

Appearances and goals by national team and year
National team	Year	Apps	Goals
Angola	2024	2	1
Angola	2025	0	0
Angola	2026	7	3
Total		9	4

=== International goals ===
Scores and results list Angola's goal tally first, score column indicates score after each Miro goal.

No.	Date	Venue	Opponent	Score	Result	Competition
1	3 July 2024	Nelson Mandela Bay Stadium, Gqeberha, South Africa	Lesotho	3–1	3–1	2024 COSAFA Cup
2	6 October 2026	11 November Stadium, Luanda, Angola	Malawi	3–1	3–1	2027 Africa Cup of Nations qualification
3	14 November 2026	11 November Stadium, Luanda, Angola	South Sudan	2–0	2–0	2027 Africa Cup of Nations qualification
4	17 November 2026	Juba Stadium, Juba, South Sudan	South Sudan	1–0	1–0	2027 Africa Cup of Nations qualification

== Honours ==
Angola

- COSAFA Cup: 2024
