= Muhammed Badamosi =

Gambian footballer (born 1998)

Personal information
- Date of birth: 27 December 1998 (age 27)
- Place of birth: Bundung, The Gambia
- Height: 1.96 m (6 ft 5 in)
- Position: Striker

Team information
- Current team: Riga FC
- Number: 19

Youth career
- 2013–2015: Jolakunda

Senior career*
Years	Team	Apps	(Gls)
2015–2016	Real Banjul	10	(2)
2016–2017	Olympique Ngor	13	(7)
2017–2020	FUS Rabat	62	(7)
2020–2023	Kortrijk	32	(1)
2022–2023	→ Čukarički (loan)	36	(11)
2023–2025	Čukarički	4	(1)
2023–2024	→ Al-Hazem (loan)	30	(4)
2024–2025	→ Standard Liège (loan)	8	(0)
2025	→ Abha (loan)	15	(6)
2025	CFR Cluj	6	(0)
2026–	Riga FC	32	(24)

International career^{‡}
2016–2017	Gambia U20		
2018–	Gambia	28	(6)
- * Club domestic league appearances and goals as of 12 November 2026 ‡ National team caps and goals as of 29 September 2026

Muhammed Badamosi (born 27 December 1998) is a Gambian professional footballer who plays as a striker for Latvian club Riga FC and the Gambia national team.

== Early career ==
Born in Bundung, The Gambia, Badamosi started his playing career at home town club Jolakunda in 2013. While at Jolakunda, he drew the attention of many GFA League First Division clubs. Despite still been a kid, the top clubs were eager to sign him as they saw a brighter future in him.

== Club career ==
=== Real de Banjul ===
After a season with Jolakunda in the Nawettan League, it was GFA League First Division giant, Real de Banjul that won the race to sign the newest talent in Gambian football. He began his Real de Banjul in 2015 as he aimed to become the new star in the GFA League First Division. However, he didn't realized his dream as he had to cut his Real de Banjul career short to move to the Senegal Premier League. He made less than 15 appearances for Real de Banjul and score two goals before departing the club in 2016.

=== Olympique de Ngor ===
After spending less than a full season with Real de Banjul, Badamosi moved to Senegal Premier League club, Olympique de Ngor on a season loan from Real de Banjul. He may not have had the opportunity to get the goals rolling at the back of the net in the GFA League First Division, but he made use of his time in Senegal as he became one of the best finishers in Senegalese football. Just in his first year, he registered seven goals in thirteen appearances as he became the target of several top clubs.

=== FUS Rabat ===
After a season with Olympique de Ngor, Badamosi would go on to be the target of many clubs in Senegal and other top African countries. Following negotiations with several to top clubs, he made a permanent switch to Morocco Botola club, FUS Rabat. He joined the club on a four-year deal. He made his debut against Raja Casablanca on September 26, 2017 in the Moroccan Throne Cup match which played to a goalless draw. He scored his first Botola goal in FUS Rabat 2–0 win of Racing de Casablanca on 28 October 2017.

=== Kortrijk ===
On 5 October 2020, he signed a four-year contract with Kortrijk in Belgium. Due to visa delays, he did not arrive to Belgium until three weeks later.

==== Loan to Čukarički ====
In the summer of 2022, Badamosi joined Čukarički in Serbia on loan with an option to buy.

=== Al-Hazem ===
On 25 August 2023, Badamosi joined Saudi Pro League club Al-Hazem on a one-year loan from Čukarički.

=== Return to Belgium ===
On 28 August 2024, Badamosi moved to Standard Liège on loan with an option to buy.

=== Abha ===
On 1 February 2025, Badamosi joined Saudi First Division League club Abha on a six-month loan.

=== Riga FC ===
On 25 January 2026, Badamosi joined Latvian club Riga FC.

== International career ==
=== Youth ===
After some brilliant performances in the GFA League First Division, Badamosi was invited by Gambia U-20 coach, Omar Sise in 2016 to attend a trial for the Gambia U-20 ahead of a crucial match against the Guinea U-20 national team in the 2017 Africa U-20 Cup of Nations qualifiers. Out of the 35 players invited, he made the final list of players for the match against Guinea. His Gambia U-20 debut ended not in the best way as Gambia lost to Guinea 2–1 in Conakry to exit the 2017 Africa U-20 Cup of Nations qualifiers.

=== Senior ===
Less than a year after joining FUS Rabat, he was given a call-up to the Gambia national senior team for a friendly match against Morocco.

He played in the 2021 Africa Cup of Nations, his national team's first continental tournament, where they made a sensational quarter-final.

== Career statistics ==
=== International ===
As of match played 29 September 2026

Appearances and goals by national team and year
National team	Year	Apps	Goals
Gambia	2018	1	0
Gambia	2019	4	0
Gambia	2020	0	0
Gambia	2021	5	1
Gambia	2022	6	0
Gambia	2023	4	1
Gambia	2024	6	2
Gambia	2026	2	2
Total		28	6

Scores and results list Gambia's goal tally first, score column indicates score after each Badamosi goal.

List of international goals scored by Muhammed Badamosi
No.	Date	Venue	Cap	Opponent	Score	Result	Competition
1	5 June 2021	Arslan Zeki Demirci Sports Complex, Manavgat, Turkey	7	Niger	2–0	2–0	Friendly
2	10 September 2023	Marrakesh Stadium, Marrakesh, Morocco	18	Congo	2–2	2–2	2023 Africa Cup of Nations qualification
3	10 September 2023	Berkane Municipal Stadium, Berkane, Morocco	23	Seychelles	1–0	5–1	2026 FIFA World Cup qualification
4	10 September 2023	Berkane Municipal Stadium, Berkane, Morocco	23	Seychelles	4–0	5–1	2026 FIFA World Cup qualification
5	25 September 2026	Independence Stadium, Bakau, Gambia	27	Somalia	2–1	2–1	2027 Africa Cup of Nations qualification
6	29 September 2026	Accra Sports Stadium, Accra, Ghana	28	Ghana	1–2	4–2	2027 Africa Cup of Nations qualification

== Honours ==
Čukarički

- Serbian Cup runner-up: 2022–23

Individual

- Serbian SuperLiga Player of the Week: 2022–23 (Round 9)
