= Pathé Mboup =

Senegalese footballer (born 2003)

Personal information
- Date of birth: 19 October 2003 (age 23)
- Place of birth: Mbao, Pikine, Senegal
- Height: 1.75 m (5 ft 9 in)
- Position: Left winger

Team information
- Current team: Brest
- Number: 99

Youth career
- 2013–2020: Dakar Sacré-Cœur

Senior career*
Years	Team	Apps	(Gls)
2020–2022	Dakar Sacré-Cœur		
2022	SL16 FC	0	(0)
2022–2023	Lyon B	20	(8)
2023–2024	RWD Molenbeek	19	(2)
2024–2025	Pau	35	(10)
2025–	Brest	33	(2)

International career^{‡}
2022–	Senegal U23	1	(0)
2026–	Senegal	2	(2)
- * Club domestic league appearances and goals as of 19 May 2026 ‡ National team caps and goals as of 16 November 2026

Pathé Mboup (born 19 October 2003) is a Senegalese professional footballer who plays as a left winger for French Ligue 1 club Brest and the Senegal national team.

== Early career ==
Born in Mbao, joined the Dakar Sacré-Cœur youth academy at the age of 10. Mboup completed his entire development there. In the 2020-21 Ligue 1 season, at just 16 years old, he broke into the professional team.

In 2014, Mboup appears in the music video for the song Magic in the Air by Magic System as a young boy in a yellow jersey showing off football skills.

== Club career ==
On 31 January 2022, Mboup joined Standard Liège on a short-term contract. However, just six months after his arrival, Mboup terminated his contract with Standard Liège at the beginning of the summer of 2022.

In August 2022, he completed his transfer to Lyon after a trial. He was assigned to play with the reserve team and scored 8 goals after 20 appearances in the 2022–23 Championnat National 2.

In September 2023, he was transferred to the Belgian Pro League club RWD Molenbeek, a sister club of Lyon belonging to John Textor's Eagle Football Holdings Limited, without any transfer fee but with a 50% sell-on clause for Lyon on any future transfer profit. On 28 September 2023, he made his professional debut in his team's 2–3 defeat against Union SG. On 16 December 2023, Mboup scored his first goal at the professional level and also assisted once to help his team win 3–0 against Sint-Truidense.

In July 2024, he joined Pau FC in Ligue 2, signing a 3-year contract. He was given the number 9 shirt. During the 2024–25 Ligue 2 pre-season, Mboup made a strong impression by scoring a hat-trick in a friendly match against Real Sociedad B, demonstrating his potential to become a key player for the team and make fans forget about Mons Bassouamina, who had left the club earlier in the summer. In his debut for Pau FC in Ligue 2, Mboup made an impact by assisting Taïryk Arconte in a 2–2 draw with Clermont Foot at the Stade Gabriel-Montpied. Clermont Foot, had been relegated from Ligue 1 the previous season.

On 24 September 2024, Mboup scored his first competitive goal for Pau FC in a 1–0 victory against FC Lorient. His decisive goal secured all three points for his team in a tightly contested match. A few minutes later, Mboup's pressure forced Lorient defender Montassar Talbi into a mistake that resulted in a red card, giving Pau FC a numerical advantage for the remainder of the game.

On 31 August 2025, Mboup joined Ligue 1 side Brest for a reported fee of €1.7m, signing a five-year contract.

== International career ==
Mboup has also represented Senegal at the U23 level. He was among the 23 players called up by coach Demba Mbaye in September 2022 for friendly matches against Morocco, as part of the preparation for the Africa U-23 Cup of Nations.

== Career statistics ==
=== International ===
As of match played 16 November 2026

Appearances and goals by national team and year
National team	Year	Apps	Goals
Senegal	2026	2	2
Total		2	2

Senegal score listed first, score column indicates score after each Mboup goal.

List of international goals scored by Pathé Mboup
No.	Date	Venue	Opponent	Score	Result	Competition
1	12 November 2026	Leopold Sédar Senghor Stadium, Dakar, Senegal	Sudan	4–1	4–1	2027 Africa Cup of Nations qualification
2	16 November 2026	Juba National Stadium, Juba, South Sudan	Sudan	3–2	4–2	2027 Africa Cup of Nations qualification
