= Ezoo El Maremi =

Libyan association football player (born 1998)

Personal information
- Full name: Ezzeddin Amer Faraj El Maremi
- Date of birth: 22 August 1998 (age 28)
- Place of birth: Tripoli, Libya
- Height: 1.87 m (6 ft 2 in)
- Position: Forward

Team information
- Current team: Al Ahli Tripoli
- Number: 14

Senior career*
Years	Team	Apps	(Gls)
2016	Al Ittihad Tripoli		
2017–2018	Al Ahli Tripoli		
2018–2019	Al-Nasr Zliten		
2019	Shabab Al-Ordon		
2019–2020	Métlaoui	7	(0)
2020–2021	Al-Madina		
2021–2023	Al Ittihad Tripoli		
2021–2023	→ Abu Salim (loan)		
2023–2025	Al Hilal Benghazi		
2025–	Al Ahli Tripoli	22	(14)

International career^{‡}
2023–	Libya	17	(7)
- * Club domestic league appearances and goals as of 14:48, 1 September 2026 (UTC) ‡ National team caps and goals as of 21:00, 17 November 2026 (UTC)

Ezzeddin Amer Faraj El Maremi (Arabic: عزو المريمي; born 22 August 1998) is a Libyan footballer who plays for Al Ahli Tripoli and the Libya national team.

== Club career ==
Having played professionally in Jordan and Tunisia with Shabab Al-Ordon and Métlaoui, respectively, El Maremi returned to his native Libya in late 2020, joining Al-Madina. The following year, he signed for Al Ittihad Tripoli, and was immediately loaned to Abu Salim.

== International career ==
El Mariamy scored his first goal at international level in a 3–1 2026 FIFA World Cup qualification loss to Cameroon in March 2025.

== Career statistics ==
=== Club ===
As of 1 September 2026.

Club	Season	League			Cup		Continental		Other		Total	
Club	Season	Division	Apps	Goals	Apps	Goals	Apps	Goals	Apps	Goals	Apps	Goals
Métlaoui	2019–20	CLP-1	7	0	0	0	0	0	0	0	7	0
Al Hilal Benghazi	2023–24	Libyan Premier League	–		0	0	7 (Note: Appearances in the CAF Confederation Cup)	2	0	0	7	2
Al Hilal Benghazi	2024–25	Libyan Premier League	24	13	0	0	2	0	5 (Note: Appearances in the Libyan Premier League Championship Playoffs)	2	31	15
Al Hilal Benghazi	Total		24	13	0	0	9	2	5	2	38	17
Al Ahli Tripoli	2025–26	Libyan Premier League	22	14	0	0	3 (Note: Appearances in the CAF Champions League)	0	0	0	25	14
Career total			53	27	0	0	12	2	5	2	70	31

=== International ===
As of 17 November 2026

National team	Year	Apps	Goals
Libya	2023	1	0
Libya	2024	3	0
Libya	2025	7	4
Libya	2026	6	3
Total		17	7

Libya score listed first, score column indicates score after each El Mariamy goal.

List of international goals scored by Ezoo El Mariamy
No.	Date	Venue	Cap	Opponent	Score	Result	Competition
1	25 March 2025	Ahmadou Ahidjo Stadium, Yaoundé, Cameroon	6	Cameroon	1–3	1–3	2026 FIFA World Cup qualification
2	4 September 2025	11 November Stadium, Luanda, Angola	7	Angola	1–0	1–0	2026 FIFA World Cup qualification
3	8 September 2025	28 March Stadium, Benghazi, Libya	8	Eswatini	2–0	2–0	2026 FIFA World Cup qualification
4	8 October 2025	Tripoli Stadium, Tripoli, Libya	9	Cape Verde	2–1	3–3	2026 FIFA World Cup qualification
5	31 March 2026	Larbi Zaouli Stadium, Casablanca, Morocco	13	Liberia	1–0	2–2	Friendly
6	24 September 2026	Tripoli Stadium, Tripoli, Libya	14	Botswana	2–2	2–2	2027 Africa Cup of Nations qualification
7	17 November 2026	Tripoli Stadium, Tripoli, Libya	17	Tunisia	1–1	1–1	2027 Africa Cup of Nations qualification
