= Junior Kadile =

French footballer (born 2002)

Personal information
- Full name: Junior-Morau Kadile
- Date of birth: 16 December 2002 (age 23)
- Place of birth: Rennes, France
- Height: 1.82 m (6 ft 0 in)
- Position: Forward

Team information
- Current team: Lens (on loan from Servette)
- Number: 28

Youth career
- 2010–2013: CPB Bréquigny
- 2013–2021: Rennes

Senior career*
Years	Team	Apps	(Gls)
2018–2023	Rennes B	19	(3)
2021–2023	Rennes	0	(0)
2022–2023	→ Famalicão (loan)	18	(2)
2023–2024	Laval	38	(3)
2024–2026	Almere City	54	(11)
2026	→ Servette (loan)	13	(6)
2026–	Servette	0	(0)
2026–	→ Lens (loan)	5	(0)

International career^{‡}
2018	France U16	4	(0)
2018–2019	France U17	4	(0)
2026–	DR Congo	5	(1)
- * Club domestic league appearances and goals as of 30 October 2026 ‡ National team caps and goals as of 17 November 2026

Junior-Morau Kadile (born 16 December 2002) is a professional footballer who plays as a forward for Ligue 1 club Lens, on loan from Swiss Super League side Servette. Born in France, he represents the DR Congo national team.

== Early life ==
Kadile was born in Rennes, Brittany, to DR Congolese parents. He acquired French nationality on 4 December 2009, through the collective effect of his parents' naturalization.

== Club career ==
Kadile made his professional debut for Rennes in a Coupe de France match against Nancy 2 January 2022. The match ended in a penalty shoot-out victory for Nancy following a 1–1 draw.

On 31 January 2022, after extending his contract with Stade Rennais until 2024, he was loaned to Portuguese club FC Famalicão in the Primeira Liga for the rest of the season.

In June 2023, he signed a three-year contract for Laval in Ligue 2.

On 30 August 2024, Kadile moved to Almere City in the Netherlands on a three-year contract.

On 31 August 2026, Kadile joined Lens on loan with an option to buy.

== International career ==
Kadile was one of the players who were called up with the DR Congo national team by head coach Sébastien Desabre for the 2027 Africa Cup of Nations qualification matches against Equatorial Guinea (24 September 2026), Zimbabwe (28 September) and the 2 friendlies against Uganda (2 and 5 October).

== Career statistics ==
=== Club ===
As of match played 30 October 2026

Appearances and goals by club, season and competition
Club	Season	League			National cup (Note: Includes Coupe de France, Taça de Portugal, Swiss Cup, Coupe de France)		League cup (Note: Includes Taça da Liga)		Europe		Total	
Club	Season	Division	Apps	Goals	Apps	Goals	Apps	Goals	Apps	Goals	Apps	Goals
Rennes B	2019–20	CFA 2	3	0	—		—		—		3	0
Rennes B	2020–21	CFA 2	2	0	—		—		—		2	0
Rennes B	2021–22	CFA 2	12	3	—		—		—		12	3
Rennes B	Total		17	3	—		—		—		17	3
Rennes	2021–22	Ligue 1	0	0	1	0	—		0	0	1	0
Famalicão (loan)	2021–22	Primeira Liga	4	1	0	0	0	0	—		4	1
Famalicão (loan)	2022–23	Primeira Liga	14	1	2	0	3	0	—		19	1
Famalicão (loan)	Total		18	2	2	0	3	0	—		23	2
Laval	2023–24	Ligue 2	36	2	5	2	—		—		41	4
Laval	2024–25	Ligue 2	2	1	0	0	—		—		2	1
Laval	Total		38	3	5	2	—		—		43	5
Almere City	2024–25	Eredivisie	30	5	1	0	—		—		31	5
Almere City	2025–26	Eerste Divisie	24	6	3	0	—		—		27	6
Almere City	Total		54	11	4	0	—		—		58	11
Servette (loan)	2025–26	Swiss Super League	13	6	—		—		—		13	6
Servette	2026–27	Swiss Super League	0	0	0	0	0	0	—		0	0
Lens (loan)	2026–27	Ligue 1	5	0	0	0	—		2 (Note: Appearances in UEFA Champions League)	0	7	0
Career total			145	25	12	2	3	0	2	0	162	27

=== International ===
As of match played 17 November 2026

Appearances and goals by national team and year
National team	Year	Apps	Goals
DR Congo	2026	5	1
Total		5	1
