= Sera Motebang =

Mosotho footballer (born 1995)

Personal information
- Date of birth: 1 May 1995 (age 31)
- Place of birth: Maseru, Lesotho
- Position: Forward

Team information
- Current team: Royal AM
- Number: 9

Senior career*
Years	Team	Apps	(Gls)
2015–2019	Matlama		(18)
2019–2021	Bloemfontein Celtic	38	(9)
2021–	Royal AM	61	(7)
2022	→ Golden Arrows (loan)	3	(0)

International career^{‡}
2016–	Lesotho	84	(15)
- * Club domestic league appearances and goals as of 15 June 2024 ‡ National team caps and goals as of 17 November 2026

Sera Motebang (born 1 May 1995) is a professional footballer who plays as a forward for Royal AM and the Lesotho national team.

== Career statistics ==
=== International ===
As of match played 17 November 2026

Appearances and goals by national team and year
National team	Year	Apps	Goals
Lesotho	2016	6	1
Lesotho	2017	10	2
Lesotho	2018	8	3
Lesotho	2019	8	1
Lesotho	2020	2	0
Lesotho	2021	6	2
Lesotho	2022	9	1
Lesotho	2023	9	1
Lesotho	2024	13	1
Lesotho	2025	5	0
Lesotho	2026	8	3
Total		84	15

Scores and results list Lesotho's goal tally first.

List of international goals scored by Sera Motebang
No.	Date	Venue	Opponent	Score	Result	Competition
1.	12 June 2016	Independence Stadium, Windhoek, Namibia	Mauritius	3–0	3–0	2016 COSAFA Cup
2.	28 May 2017	Somhlolo National Stadium, Lobamba, Swaziland	Swaziland	1–0	1–0	Friendly
3.	5 July 2017	Moruleng Stadium, Saulspoort, South Africa	Zimbabwe	1–1	3–4	2017 COSAFA Cup
4.	27 March 2018	Sam Nujoma Stadium, Windhoek, Namibia	Namibia	1–0	1–2	Friendly
5.	2 June 2018	Peter Mokaba Stadium, Polokwane, South Africa	Swaziland	1–0	1–0	2018 COSAFA Cup
6.	9 September 2018	Setsoto Stadium, Maseru, Lesotho	Cape Verde	1–0	1–1	2019 Africa Cup of Nations qualification
7.	5 June 2019	Moses Mabhida Stadium, Durban, South Africa	Botswana	1–2	1–2	2019 COSAFA Cup
8.	8 July 2021	Isaac Wolfson Stadium, Port Elizabeth, South Africa	Zambia	1–1	2–1	2021 COSAFA Cup
9.	8 July 2021	Isaac Wolfson Stadium, Port Elizabeth, South Africa	Zambia	2–1	2–1	2021 COSAFA Cup
10.	27 March 2022	Complexe Sportif de Côte d'Or, Saint Pierre, Mauritius	Seychelles	3–1	3–1	2023 Africa Cup of Nations qualification
11.	7 July 2023	King Zwelithini Stadium, Durban, South Africa	Mauritius	2–0	2–0	2023 COSAFA Cup
12.	5 September 2024	Ben M'Hamed El Abdi Stadium, El Jadida, Morocco	Central African Republic	1–2	1–3	2025 Africa Cup of Nations qualification
13.	29 March 2026	Free State Stadium, Bloemfontein, South Africa	Seychelles	2–1	2–1	2027 Africa Cup of Nations qualification
14.	25 September 2026	Accra Sports Stadium, Accra, Ghana	Niger	1–2	1–2	2027 Africa Cup of Nations qualification
15.	17 November 2026	Peter Mokaba Stadium, Polokwane, South Africa	Gabon	2–0	2–1	2027 Africa Cup of Nations qualification
