= Saidou Alioum =

Cameroonian footballer (born 2003)

Personal information
- Full name: Saidou Alioum Moubarak
- Date of birth: 25 July 2003 (age 23)
- Place of birth: Maroua, Cameroon
- Height: 1.74 m (5 ft 9 in)
- Position: Winger

Team information
- Current team: Jablonec
- Number: 17

Youth career
- Sahel FC

Senior career*
Years	Team	Apps	(Gls)
2020–2022	Sahel FC		
2022	→ Hammarby TFF (loan)	11	(5)
2023–2025	Hammarby IF	1	(0)
2023–2025	→ Omonia (loan)	55	(12)
2025–2026	IFK Göteborg	29	(2)
2026–	Jablonec	9	(1)

International career^{‡}
2019	Cameroon U17	5	(0)
2021	Cameroon U20	3	(0)
2026–	Cameroon	7	(3)
- * Club domestic league appearances and goals as of 19:23, 25 October 2026 (UTC) ‡ National team caps and goals as of 18:00, 16 November 2026 (UTC)

Saidou Alioum Moubarak (born 25 July 2003) is a Cameroonian professional footballer who plays as a winger for Jablonec and the Cameroon national team.

== Early life ==
Alioum was born in Maroua, in the Far North Region of Cameroon, and started his career with local club Sahel FC in the domestic regional leagues.

== Club career ==
=== Hammarby IF ===
On 22 July 2022, Alioum joined Hammarby TFF in Sweden's third tier Ettan, the feeder team of Allsvenskan club Hammarby IF, on a six-month loan. He made 11 league appearances for Hammarby TFF, scoring five goals, helping the side to finish 6th in the 2022 Ettan table.

On 30 January 2023, Alioum completed a permanent transfer to Hammarby, being part of their senior squad, signing a four-year contract. On 5 March the same year, he made his competitive debut for the club, coming on as a substitute in an 8–0 home win against GIF Sundsvall in Svenska Cupen. About a week later, he once again came on as a substitute in a 2–1 win against local rival AIK in the quarter-final of Svenska Cupen.

==== Loan to Omonia ====
On 14 September 2023, after suffering from limited playing time, Alioum was sent on a one year-loan to Omonia Nicosia in the Cypriot First Division, with an option to buy. He made his debut just two days later, coming on as a substitute in a goalless draw at AEL Limassol. On 7 October, he scored his first goal for Omonia in a home draw against AEZ Zakakiou. He was named the most valuable player in the Nicosia derby on 16 March 2024. On 10 April, he scored Omonia's third goal in the first leg of the Cypriot Cup semi-finals against Aris Limassol.

On 24 July 2024, Alioum returned to Omonia on another year-long loan with an option to buy. On 25 August, he came off the bench to score a brace in Omonia's 3–0 home win against Ethnikos Achna in the opening game week of the 2024–25 championship.

=== Jablonec ===
On 14 August 2026, Alioum signed a multi-year contract with Czech First League club Jablonec.

== International career ==
In April 2019, Alioum was called up to Cameroon's squad for the Africa U-17 Cup of Nations. He made five appearances throughout the tournament, that Cameroon eventually went on to win.

In 2021, Alioum represented Cameroon in the Africa U-20 Cup of Nations. He made three appearances, before his country was knocked out by Ghana on penalties in the quarter-finals.

== Style of play ==
Alioum mainly operates as a winger.

== Career statistics ==
=== Club ===
As of match played 25 October 2026

Club	Season	League			National Cup		Continental		Other		Total	
Club	Season	Division	Apps	Goals	Apps	Goals	Apps	Goals	Apps	Goals	Apps	Goals
Hammarby TFF	2022	Ettan	11	5	—		—		—		11	5
Hammarby IF	2023	Allsvenskan	1	0	4	0	0	0	—		5	0
Omonia (loan)	2023–24	Cypriot First Division	25	3	4	1	—		—		29	4
Omonia (loan)	2024–25	Cypriot First Division	30	9	3	0	11	2	—		44	11
Omonia (loan)	Total		55	12	7	1	11	2	0	0	73	15
IFK Göteborg	2025	Allsvenskan	16	2	1	0	—		—		17	2
IFK Göteborg	2026	Allsvenskan	13	0	4	2	2	2	—		19	4
IFK Göteborg	Total		29	2	5	2	2	2	—		34	6
Jablonec	2026–27	Czech First League	9	1	0	0	4	2	—		13	3
Career total			80	20	15	3	17	6	0	0	112	27

=== International ===
As of match played 16 November 2026

Appearances and goals by national team and year
National team	Year	Apps	Goals
Cameroon	2026	7	3
Total		7	3

As of match played 16 November 2026
Cameroon score listed first, score column indicates score after each Alioum goal.

List of international goals scored by Saidou Alioum
No.	Date	Venue	Cap	Opponent	Score	Result	Competition
1	31 March 2026	Melbourne Rectangular Stadium, Melbourne, Australia	2	China	2–0	2–0	2026 FIFA Series
2	12 November 2026	Japoma Stadium, Douala, Cameroon	6	Namibia	1–0	2–0	2027 Africa Cup of Nations qualification
3	16 November 2026	Botswana National Stadium, Gaborone, Botswana	7	Namibia	3–0	3–0	2027 Africa Cup of Nations qualification
