= Benjaloud Youssouf =

Footballer (born 1994)

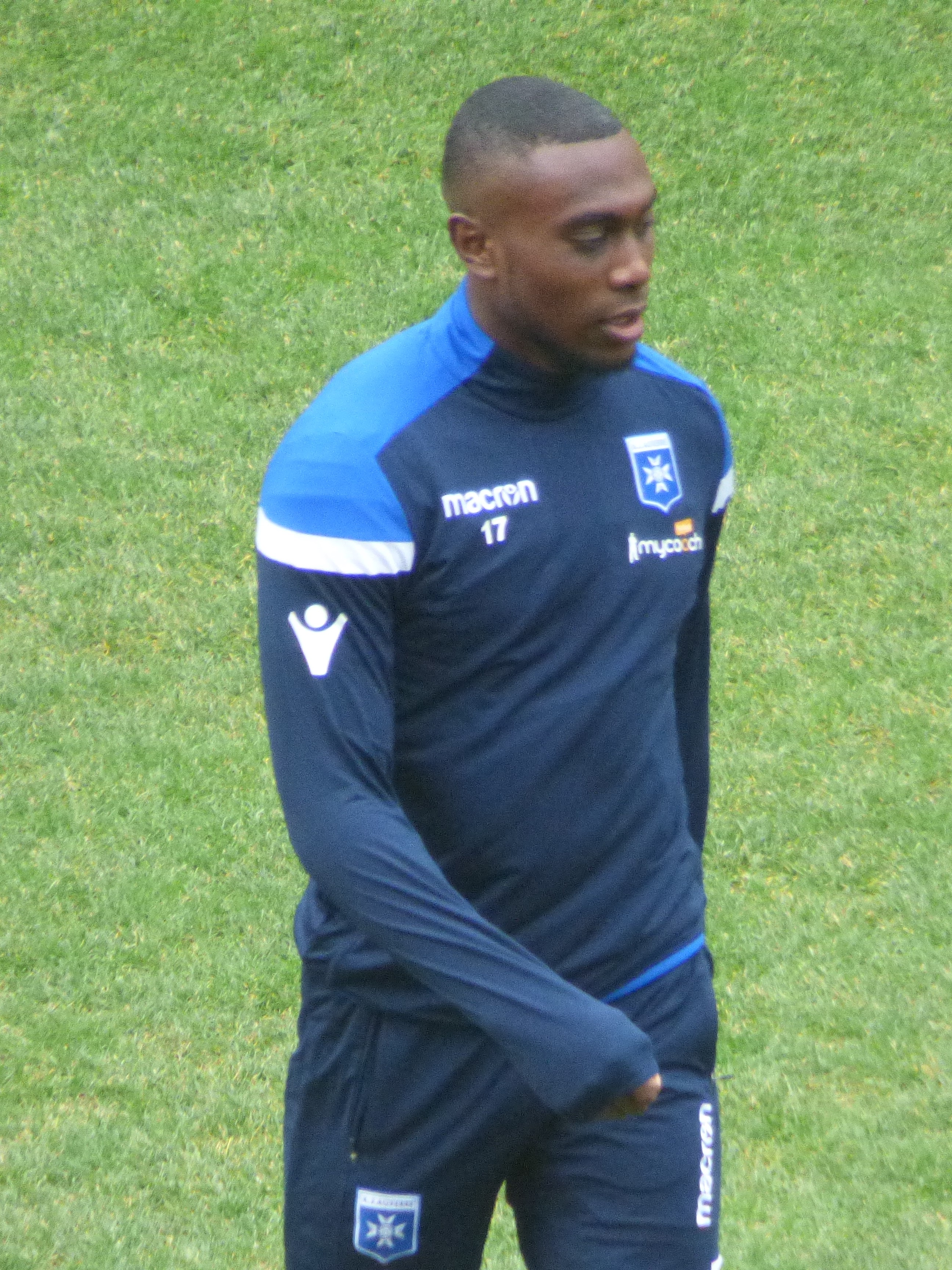
- Youssouf with Auxerre in 2019

Personal information
- Date of birth: 11 February 1994 (age 32)
- Place of birth: Marseille, France
- Height: 1.76 m (5 ft 9 in)
- Position: Midfielder

Team information
- Current team: Sochaux
- Number: 17

Senior career*
Years	Team	Apps	(Gls)
2012–2013	Nantes B	0	(0)
2013–2017	Orléans	68	(6)
2017–2020	Auxerre B	20	(4)
2017–2020	Auxerre	27	(0)
2020–2021	Le Mans	32	(4)
2021–2023	Châteauroux	47	(9)
2021–2022	Châteauroux B	4	(0)
2023–2025	Dunkerque	47	(2)
2025-	Sochaux	23	(1)

International career^{‡}
2015–	Comoros	55	(6)
- * Club domestic league appearances and goals as of 23 June 2026 ‡ National team caps and goals as of 29 September 2026

Benjaloud Youssouf (born 11 February 1994) is a professional footballer who plays as a midfielder for Ligue 2 club Sochaux. Born in France, he plays for the Comoros national team.

== Club career ==
Born in Marseille, Youssouf was part of the FC Nantes U19 side that reached the semi-final of the Coupe Gambardella. He joined Orléans in 2013 and turned professional with them.

In June 2017, he moved to AJ Auxerre, signing a three-year contract.

At the end of his Auxerre contract, having not featured for the first team for the whole 2019–20 season, Youssouf signed for Le Mans.

On 23 June 2021, he signed a two-year contract with Châteauroux.

On 5 July 2023, Youssouf joined Dunkerque on a one-year contract, with an optional second year.

On 10 June 2025, Youssouf joined Sochaux on a two-year contract.

== International career ==
Bendjaloud Youssouf honours his first selection with the Comoros on October 7, 2015, in a match against Lesotho returning as part of the 2018 FIFA World Cup qualification (zero match 0-0).

Youssouf was named to the Comoros squad for the 2021 Africa Cup of Nations. He played all four matches of his team.

On 11 December 2025, Youssouf was called up to the Comoros squad for the 2025 Africa Cup of Nations.

=== International goals ===
Scores and results list Comoros' goal tally first, score column indicates score after each Youssouf goal.

List of international goals scored by Benjaloud Youssouf
No.	Date	Venue	Opponent	Score	Result	Competition
1	24 March 2017	Stade Said Mohamed Cheikh, Mitsamiouli, Comoros	Mauritius	1–0	2–0	2019 Africa Cup of Nations qualification
2	3 June 2022	Stade Omnisports de Malouzini, Moroni, Comoros	Lesotho	2–0	2–0	2023 Africa Cup of Nations qualification
3	9 September 2023	Stade Omnisports de Malouzini, Moroni, Comoros	Zambia	1–0	1–1	2023 Africa Cup of Nations qualification
4	17 November 2023	Stade Omnisports de Malouzini, Moroni, Comoros	Central African Republic	2–1	4–2	2026 FIFA World Cup qualification
5	17 November 2025	Stade Omnisports de Malouzini, Moroni, Comoros	Namibia	2–0	4–0	Friendly
6	29 September 2026	Stade Omnisports de Malouzini, Moroni, Comoros	Namibia	1–0	1–0	2027 Africa Cup of Nations qualification
