= Adem Arous =

Tunisian footballer (born 2004)

Personal information
- Date of birth: 17 July 2004 (age 22)
- Place of birth: Medina, Saudi Arabia
- Height: 1.88 m (6 ft 2 in)
- Position: Centre-back

Team information
- Current team: Kasımpaşa
- Number: 4

Senior career*
Years	Team	Apps	(Gls)
2022–2025	Stade Tunisien	34	(1)
2023–2024	→ AS Oued Ellil (loan)		
2025–	Kasımpaşa	28	(3)

International career^{‡}
2026–	Tunisia	4	(1)
- * Club domestic league appearances and goals as of 21:41, 21 October 2026 (UTC) ‡ National team caps and goals as of 21:41, 21 October 2026 (UTC)

Adem Arous (Arabic: آدم عروس; born 17 July 2004) is a Tunisian professional footballer who plays as a centre-back for Süper Lig club Kasımpaşa. Born in Saudi Arabia, he plays for the Tunisia national team.

== Club career ==
Arous began his senior career with Stade Tunisien in 2022, and was promoted to their senior team in 2024. On 24 January 2025, he extended his contract with Stade Tunisian until 2029. On 2 September 2025, he transferred to the Turkish Süper Lig club Kasımpaşa.

== International career ==
Arous was called up to the Tunisia national team for the 2025 Africa Cup of Nations.

On 15 May 2026, Arous was named in the Tunisia squad for the 2026 FIFA World Cup.

== Career statistics ==
=== International ===
As of match played 28 September 2026

Appearances and goals by national team and year
National team	Year	Apps	Goals
Tunisia
Tunisia	2026	4	1
Total		3	0

Scores and results list Tunisia's goal tally first, score column indicates score after each Arous goal.

List of international goals scored by Adem Arous
No.	Date	Venue	Opponent	Score	Result	Competition
1	24 September 2026	Hammadi Agrebi Stadium, Radès, Tunisia	Uganda	1–0	1–1	2027 Africa Cup of Nations qualification

== Honours ==
Stade Tunisien

- Tunisian Cup: 2023–24
