= Dermane Karim =

Togolese footballer (born 2003)

Personal information
- Date of birth: 26 December 2003 (age 22)
- Place of birth: Sokodé, Togo
- Height: 1.66 m (5 ft 5 in)
- Position: Defensive midfielder

Team information
- Current team: Troyes
- Number: 29

Youth career
- 2013–2019: WAFA
- 2019–2022: Planète Foot Togo
- 2022–2023: Feyenoord

Senior career*
Years	Team	Apps	(Gls)
2022–2023	Feyenoord	1	(0)
2023–2026	Lommel SK	43	(3)
2025	→ Kortrijk (loan)	15	(1)
2025–2026	→ Lorient (loan)	30	(1)
2026–	Troyes	2	(0)

International career^{‡}
2022	Togo U23	3	(2)
2022–	Togo	30	(4)
- * Club domestic league appearances and goals as of 6 September 2026 ‡ National team caps and goals as of 25 September 2026

Dermane Karim (born 26 December 2003) is a Togolese professional footballer who plays as a midfielder for Ligue 1 club Troyes and the Togo national team.

== Club career ==
Dermane is a youth product of WAFA SC and Planète Foot Togo's youth academies. He signed his first professional contract with the Dutch club Feyenoord on 1 February 2022, keeping him at the club until June 2026.

On 15 June 2023, Dermane signed for Challenger Pro League club Lommel SK on a five-year contract.

On 14 January 2025, Karim was loaned by Kortrijk. On 9 August 2025, he moved on a new loan to Lorient in France.

On 21 August 2026, Karim returned to Ligue 1 and signed a three-season deal with Troyes.

== International career ==
Dermane is a youth international for the Togo U23s, having represented them in 2022. He debuted for the senior Togo national team in a 3–0 friendly win over Sierra Leone on 24 March 2022. He scored his first goal for the country on 24 September 2022 in a friendly against Ivory Coast.

== Career statistics ==
=== Club ===
As of match played 9 November 2024

Appearances and goals by club, season and competition
Club	Season	League			Cup		Europe		Other		Total	
Club	Season	Division	Apps	Goals	Apps	Goals	Apps	Goals	Apps	Goals	Apps	Goals
Feyenoord	2021–22	Eredivisie	1	0	0	0	0	0	—		1	0
Lommel	2023–24	Challenger Pro League	32	4	0	0	—		2 (Note: Appearances in promotion play-offs)	0	34	4
Lommel	2024–25	Challenger Pro League	10	0	0	0	—		—		10	0
Lommel	Total		42	4	0	0	—		2	0	44	4
career total			43	4	0	0	0	0	2	0	45	4

=== International ===
As of match played 25 September 2026

Appearances and goals by national team and year
National team	Year	Apps	Goals
Togo	2022	4	1
Togo	2023	7	0
Togo	2024	10	2
Togo	2025	4	0
Togo	2026	5	1
Total		30	4

Togo score listed first, score column indicates score after each Dermane goal.

List of international goals scored by Karim Dermane
No.	Date	Venue	Cap	Opponent	Score	Result	Competition
1	24 September 2022	Stade Robert Diochon, Le Petit-Quevilly, France	3	Ivory Coast	1–2	1–2	Friendly
2	22 March 2024	El Bachir Stadium, Mohammedia, Morocco	12	Niger	1–1	2–1	Friendly
3	22 March 2024	El Bachir Stadium, Mohammedia, Morocco	12	Niger	2–1	2–1	Friendly
4	25 September 2026	Kégué Stadium, Lomé, Togo	30	Burundi	1–0	1–0	2027 Africa Cup of Nations qualification
