= Loren Zúñiga =

Equatoguinean footballer (born 2003)

Personal information
- Full name: Lorenzo Zúñiga Owono
- Date of birth: 18 January 2003 (age 23)
- Place of birth: Puerto del Rosario, Spain
- Height: 1.80 m (5 ft 11 in)
- Position: Striker

Team information
- Current team: Al-Madina

Youth career
- Portada Alta
- 2012–2021: Málaga

Senior career*
| Years | Team | Apps | (Gls) |
| 2020–2023 | Málaga B | 24 | (15) |
| 2021–2023 | Málaga | 44 | (0) |
| 2024 | Real Madrid C | 16 | (8) |
| 2024–2026 | Real Madrid B | 55 | (11) |
| 2026– | Al-Madina | 0 | (0) |

International career^{‡}
| 2021–2022 | Spain U19 | 5 | (2) |
| 2025– | Equatorial Guinea | 11 | (2) |
- * Club domestic league appearances and goals as of 09:20, 22 May 2026 (UTC) ‡ National team caps and goals as of 28 September 2026

Lorenzo "Loren" Zúñiga Owono (born 18 January 2003) is a professional footballer who plays as a striker for Libyan Premier League club Al-Madina. Born in Spain, he represents Equatorial Guinea at international level.

A product of Málaga CF, playing there up to the first team, he joined later Real Madrid, being initially assigned to the second reserve side.

== Early life ==
Zúñiga was born in Fuerteventura, Canary Islands to Peninsular Spanish parents. At the time of his birth, his father, former footballer Lorenzo Zúñiga Ocaña, originally from Málaga, was signed to Fuerteventura club CD Corralejo. He was raised in Málaga, after his father's retirement from playing. He is of Equatorial Guinean descent through his maternal grandfather.

== Club career ==
Zúñiga joined Málaga CF's youth setup in 2012, aged nine, from Atlético Portada Alta. He made his senior debut with the reserves on 18 October 2020, starting in a 1–0 Tercera División home win against Juventud de Torremolinos CF.

On 23 February 2021, Zúñiga renewed his contract until 2024. He made his first team debut on 14 March, coming on as a second-half substitute for Caye Quintana in a 1–0 away win over UD Logroñés in the Segunda División.

On 29 December 2023, Zúñiga left Málaga. Later on 11 January 2024, Zúñiga signed with Real Madrid and being assigned to C-team in fifth division.

On 1 July 2024, Zúñiga was officially promoted to Real Madrid Castilla.

On 14 August 2026, Zúñiga signed a three-year contract with Libyan Premier League club Al-Madina.

== International career ==
Zúñiga officially played for the Spain national under-19 team in 2022, scoring a goal during the 2022 UEFA European Under-19 Championship qualification (whose final tournament served as a qualifier for the 2023 FIFA U-20 World Cup).

On 31 May 2025, Zúñiga received his first call up to the Equatorial Guinea national team. He made his debut on 6 June, starting in a 1–2 friendly loss to Gambia.

Despite his name not appearing at the FIFA Change of Association Platform, Zúñiga played a match for Equatorial Guinea during the 2026 FIFA World Cup qualification.

== Career statistics ==
As of match played 17 May 2025

Appearances and goals by club, season and competition
| Club | Season | League | | | Copa del Rey | | Other | | Total | |
| Club | Season | Division | Apps | Goals | Apps | Goals | Apps | Goals | Apps | Goals |
|---|---|---|---|---|---|---|---|---|---|---|
| Málaga B | 2020–21 | Tercera División | 1 | 0 | – | | 0 | 0 | 1 | 0 |
| Málaga B | 2021–22 | Tercera División RFEF | 21 | 13 | – | | 1 (Note: Appearance in 2022 Tercera División RFEF play-offs) | 0 | 22 | 13 |
| Málaga B | 2022–23 | Tercera Federación | 2 | 2 | – | | 0 | 0 | 2 | 2 |
| Málaga B | Total | | 24 | 15 | 0 | 0 | 1 | 0 | 25 | 15 |
| Málaga | 2020–21 | Segunda División | 3 | 0 | 0 | 0 | – | | 3 | 0 |
| Málaga | 2021–22 | Segunda División | 4 | 0 | 0 | 0 | – | | 4 | 0 |
| Málaga | 2022–23 | Segunda División | 23 | 0 | 1 | 0 | – | | 24 | 0 |
| Málaga | 2023–24 | Primera Federación | 14 | 0 | 2 | 0 | – | | 16 | 0 |
| Málaga | Total | | 44 | 0 | 3 | 0 | 0 | 0 | 47 | 0 |
| Real Madrid C | 2023–24 | Tercera Federación | 16 | 8 | – | | – | | 16 | 8 |
| Real Madrid Castilla | 2024–25 | Primera Federación | 27 | 5 | – | | 0 | 0 | 27 | 5 |
| Real Madrid Castilla | 2025–26 | Primera Federación | 28 | 6 | | | – | | 28 | 6 |
| Real Madrid Castilla | Total | | 55 | 11 | 0 | 0 | 0 | 0 | 55 | 11 |
| Al-Madina | 2026–27 | Libyan Premier League | – | | – | | – | | – | |
| Career total | | | 139 | 35 | 3 | 0 | 1 | 0 | 143 | 35 |

Scores and results list Equatorial Guinea's goal tally first, score column indicates score after each Zúñiga goal.

List of international goals scored by Loren Zúñiga
| No. | Date | Venue | Opponent | Score | Result | Competition |
|---|---|---|---|---|---|---|
| 1 | 31 March 2026 | Arslan Zeki Demirci Sports Complex, Antalya, Turkey | Madagascar | 1–0 | 1–1 | Friendly |
| 2 | 28 September 2026 | Ahmadou Ahidjo Stadium, Yaoundé, Cameroon | Sierra Leone | 1–0 | 1–0 | 2027 Africa Cup of Nations qualification |
