= Lebogang Ditsele =

Motswana footballer

Personal information
- Date of birth: 20 April 1996 (age 30)
- Place of birth: Ramotswa, Botswana
- Height: 1.85 m (6 ft 1 in)
- Position: Midfielder

Team information
- Current team: Gaborone United
- Number: 19

Senior career*
Years	Team	Apps	(Gls)
2012–2013	Township Rollers		
2013–2014	Jwaneng Comets		
2014–2015	Letlapeng		
2015–2016	Gilport Lions		
2016–2018	Highlands Park	4	(0)
2018–2021	Jwaneng Galaxy		
2021–	Gaborone United		

International career^{‡}
2014–	Botswana	64	(4)
- * Club domestic league appearances and goals as of 7 July 2023 ‡ National team caps and goals as of 28 September 2026

Lebogang Ditsele (born 20 April 1996) is a Motswana footballer who plays as a midfielder for Botswana Premier League club Gaborone United and the Botswana national football team.

== International career ==
=== International goals ===
Scores and results list Botswana's goal tally first.

No.	Date	Venue	Opponent	Score	Result	Competition
1.	2 June 2019	Princess Magogo Stadium, KwaMashu, South Africa	South Africa	1–2	2–2 (5–4 p)	2019 COSAFA Cup
2.	2 September 2022	Mahamasina Municipal Stadium, Antananarivo, Madagascar	Madagascar	1–1	1–1	2022 African Nations Championship qualification
3.	5 July 2023	King Zwelithini Stadium, Umlazi, South Africa	Eswatini	1–0	1–0	2023 COSAFA Cup
4.	28 September 2026	Hammadi Agrebi Stadium, Tunis, Tunisia	Tunisia	2–2	2–2	2027 Africa Cup of Nations qualification
