= Yasin Hamed =

Sudanese footballer

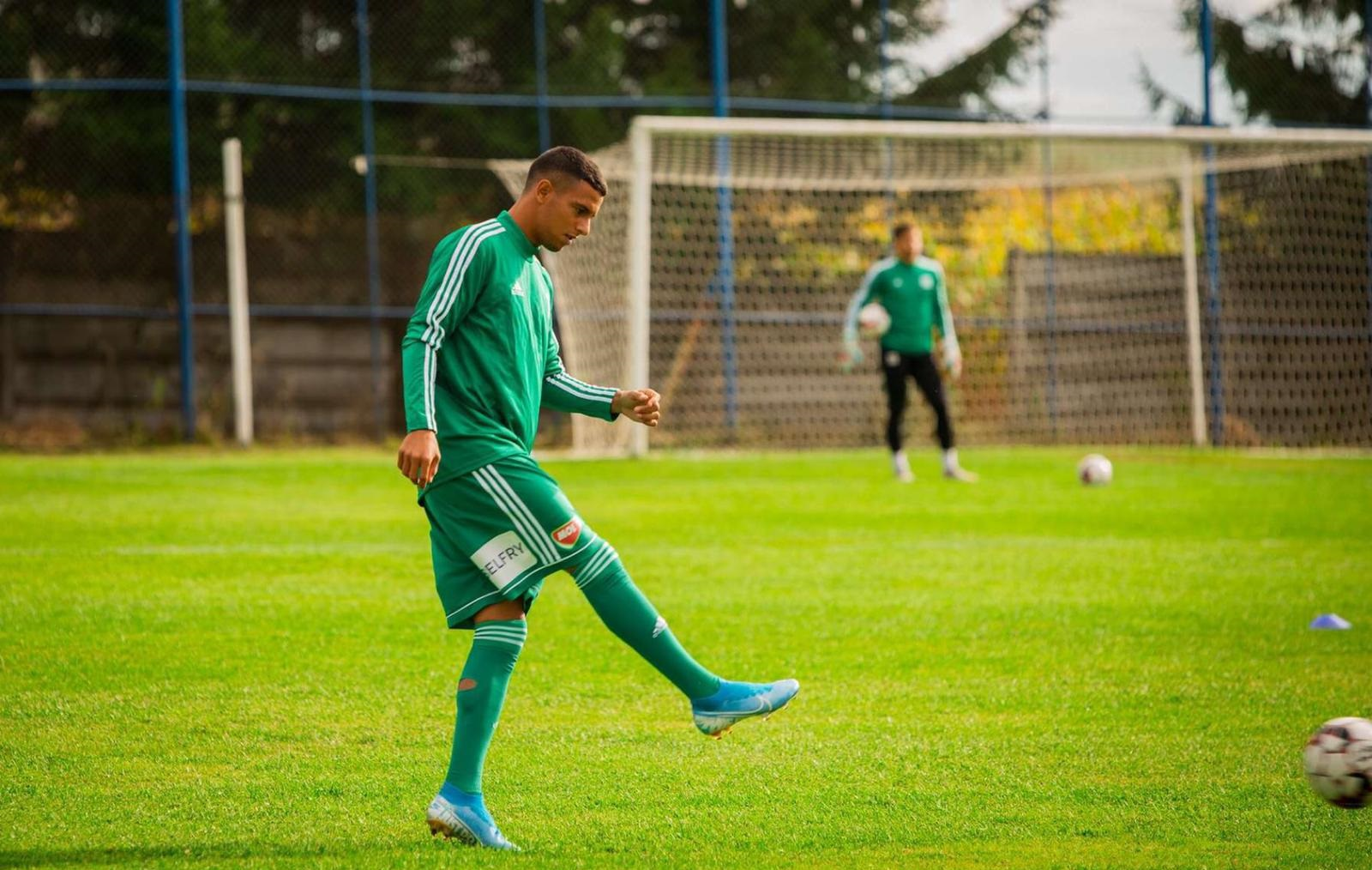

Personal information
- Full name: Yasin Khaled Abdelrahman Hamed
- Date of birth: 12 September 1999 (age 27)
- Place of birth: Salonta, Romania
- Height: 1.80 m (5 ft 11 in)
- Position: Winger

Team information
- Current team: FC Dordoi Bishkek
- Number: 17

Youth career
- –2013: Liberty Oradea
- 2013–2014: LPS Bihorul Oradea
- 2014–2016: ASA Târgu Mureș

Senior career*
Years	Team	Apps	(Gls)
2016–2017	ASA Târgu Mureș	3	(0)
2017	Pandurii Târgu Jiu	16	(1)
2017–2018	CFR Cluj	0	(0)
2018–2020	Sepsi OSK	47	(5)
2020	→ Csíkszereda (loan)	0	(0)
2020–2023	Nyíregyháza	58	(11)
2022–2023	→ Békéscsaba (loan)	36	(6)
2023–2024	Győr	7	(0)
2024–2025	Al-Ittihad Tripoli	15	(2)
2025–2026	Al-Tahaddi	2	(0)
2026	Forte Virtus	0	(0)
2026–	Dordoi Bishkek	0	(0)

International career^{‡}
2019–	Sudan	12	(1)
- * Club domestic league appearances and goals as of 22 July 2026 ‡ National team caps and goals as of 29 September 2026

Yasin Khalid Abdelrahman Hamed (Arabic: ياسين خالد عبدالرحمن حامد, born 12 September 1999) is a professional footballer who plays as a winger for UAE Second Division League club Forte Virtus. Born in Romania, he represents Sudan internationally.

== Club career ==
=== Liberty Salonta ===
Born in Salonta, Romania, Hamed started his football career playing for the academy of Liberty Salonta, where George Pușcaș, Ovidiu Bic, Alexandru Sorian or Adrian Șut were launched.

=== Târgu Mureș ===
After a short period at LPS Bihorul Oradea, he moved to ASA 2013 Târgu Mureș where, on 23 July 2016, Hamed made his Liga I debut, in a match against Gaz Metan Mediaș, lost 1-2 by "the red and blues". Followed another two matches in the kits of the team from Târgu Mureș, then in the winter of 2017 the forward chose to leave the club.

=== Pandurii Târgu Jiu ===
Yasin signed in the early 2017 a contract with Pandurii Târgu Jiu, then on 15 May 2017, aged 17, he scored his first Liga I goal in a 3–2 victory over Concordia Chiajna. The relegation of Pandurii from the top-flight of the Romanian football league system was a bad news, but the 16 matches played for the team based in Oltenia and the good performances gave him a contract from the former champion CFR Cluj.

=== CFR Cluj ===
At CFR Cluj things have stalled, the club from Cluj-Napoca chose to use him in only 4 matches of the second team, squad that is playing in the Liga III, third tier, so in the winter of 2018 Hamed chose to leave "the railwaymen".

=== Sepsi OSK Sfântu Gheorghe ===
On 11 January 2018, Yasin Hamed signed an 18-month contract with the Liga I club Sepsi OSK Sfântu Gheorghe, where in almost two years played 47 matches and scored 5 goals, being an important member of the squad that was ranked 6th at the end of the 2018–19 Liga I season, the best ranking in the history of Sepsi and the town of Sfântu Gheorghe.

== International career ==
Even if over the time Hamed expressed his desire to play for the Romania national football team, lack of interest from "The Tricolours" made him choose the Sudan national football team, for which he was selected for the first time in November 2019. The selection was made for two matches against São Tomé and Príncipe and South Africa, matches counting for the 2021 Africa Cup of Nations qualification Group C.

On 29 September 2026, Hamed scored his first international goal, an 88th minute penalty in a 4–1 defeat to Mozambique.

== Personal life ==
Hamed was born in Salonta, Romania to a Romanian mother and Sudanese Nubian father.

== Career statistics ==
As of match played 29 September 2026

Appearances and goals by national team and year
National team	Year	Apps	Goals
Sudan	2019	1	0
Sudan	2020	1	0
Sudan	2021	4	0
Sudan	2022	3	0
Sudan	2023	1	0
Sudan	2024	0	0
Sudan	2025	2	0
Sudan	2026	1	1
Total		13	1

Scores and results list Sudan's goal tally first, score column indicates score after each Hamed goal.

List of international goals scored by Yasin Hamed
No.	Date	Venue	Cap	Opponent	Score	Result	Competition
1	29 September 2026	Zimpeto Stadium, Maputo, Mozambique	13	Mozambique	1–4	1–4	2027 Africa Cup of Nations qualification

== Honours ==
CFR Cluj

- Liga I: 2017–18
