= Alie Conteh =

Sierra Leonean footballer

Personal information
- Date of birth: 29 October 2004 (age 22)
- Place of birth: Freetown, Sierra Leone
- Height: 1.82 m (6 ft 0 in)
- Position: Striker

Team information
- Current team: Inter Turku (on loan from Strømsgodset)
- Number: 10

Senior career*
Years	Team	Apps	(Gls)
2021–2025	Goderich		
2021–2022	→ East End Lions (loan)		
2022–2023	→ Kallon (loan)	19	(20)
2023–2024	→ East End Lions (loan)		
2024	→ Mjøndalen (loan)	26	(6)
2025	Mjøndalen	13	(5)
2025–	Strømsgodset	16	(2)
2026–	→ Inter Turku (loan)	32	(12)

International career^{‡}
2022–	Sierra Leone	15	(4)
- * Club domestic league appearances and goals as of 12 November 2026 ‡ National team caps and goals as of 17 November 2026

Alie Conteh (born 29 October 2004) is a Sierra Leonean footballer who plays as a striker for Veikkausliiga club Inter Turku, on loan from Strømsgodset.

Conteh belonged to the Goderich-based club Goderich, who sent him on successive loans to East End Lions, Kallon and then East End Lions again. Conteh made his biggest mark at Kallon, where he scored 20 goals in 19 league games during the 2022–23 season. He was recalled from Kallon in the summer of 2023, at the same time as he reportedly attracted European interest from Italians Udinese, Norwegians Molde FK and Stabæk IF. Conteh spent time on trial with Stabæk in August 2023.

Conteh made his international debut for Sierra Leone in a series of three friendly matches in March 2022, before the back-to-back 2022 African Nations Championship qualification matches against Cape Verde in July the same year. Conteh also scored his first 2 international goals in the first leg against Cape Verde. In March 2025 he played his first World Cup qualifying match, facing Mohamed Salah's Egypt.

Ahead of the 2024 season in Norway, Conteh did transfer to Norway as he was signed by Mjøndalen IF on loan. He immediately made a mark by scoring a hat-trick against newly relegated Vålerenga. Later in the season, Conteh scored the only goal of the match as Mjøndalen beat Aalesund away. With Mjøndalen struggling against relegation until the very end of the season, the team went to playoff where Conteh scored again in a 5–2 aggregate victory.

Conteh had his first child, a son in late 2024. He was finally able to travel to see his son in the winter of 2025. During the same period, Conteh signed for Mjøndalen on a permanent basis.

== International ==
Scores and results list Sierra Leone's goal tally first.

List of international goals scored by Alie Conteh
No.	Date	Venue	Opponent	Score	Result	Competition
1	24 July 2022	Marrakesh Stadium, Marrakesh, Morocco	Cape Verde	1–0	2–0	2022 African Nations Championship qualification
2	24 July 2022	Marrakesh Stadium, Marrakesh, Morocco	Cape Verde	2–0	2–0	2022 African Nations Championship qualification
3	24 September 2026	Ben M'Hamed El Abdi Stadium, El Jadida, Morocco	Zimbabwe	1–0	2–3	2027 Africa Cup of Nations qualification
4	17 November 2026	Ben M'Hamed El Abdi Stadium, El Jadida, Morocco	DR Congo	1–1	1–1	2027 Africa Cup of Nations qualification
