= James Bogere =

Ugandan footballer (born 2008)

Personal information
- Date of birth: 2 February 2008 (age 18)
- Place of birth: Jinja, Uganda
- Height: 1.86 m (6 ft 1 in)
- Position: Forward

Team information
- Current team: AGF
- Number: 28

Youth career
- –2025: El Cambio Academy

Senior career*
Years	Team	Apps	(Gls)
2025–2026	Masaka Sunshine		
2026–	AGF	9	(5)

International career^{‡}
2025–	Uganda U17	9	(5)
2025–	Uganda	5	(2)
- * Club domestic league appearances and goals as of 08:44, 11 October 2026 (UTC) ‡ National team caps and goals as of 20:00, 14 November 2026 (UTC)

James Bogere (born 2 February 2008) is a Ugandan professional footballer who plays as a forward for Danish Superliga club AGF and the Uganda national team.

== Early life ==
Bogere was born on 2 February 2008 in Uganda. Growing up, he attended Mother Majeri Primary School in Uganda. Subsequently, he attended Blessed Sacrament Secondary School Kimaanya in Uganda.

== Club career ==
As a youth player, Bogere joined the youth academy of Ugandan side El Cambio Academy. During the summer of 2025, he signed for Ugandan side Masaka Sunshine. Following his stint there, he signed for Danish side AGF in 2026. On 10 April 2026, he made his debut for AGF in a 1–1 draw against FC Nordsjælland.

== International career ==
Bogere is a Uganda youth international. In April 2025, he played for the Uganda national under-17 football team at the 2025 U-17 Africa Cup of Nations, sending them to the 2025 FIFA U-17 World Cup. During the World Cup he scored twice as Uganda, in its first appearance at a FIFA tournament, advanced from the group stage before being eliminated in the Round of 16. He scored two goals against the Democratic Republic of Congo (DRC) during the month of October 2026 FIFA international window.

On December 7, 2025, he was selected by Paul Put for Uganda's squad to participate in the 2025 Africa Cup of Nations.

=== International goals ===
As of match played 14 November 2026

Scores and results list Uganda's goal tally first, score column indicates score after each Bogere goal.

List of international goals scored by James Bogere
No.	Date	Venue	Opponent	Score	Result	Competition
1	2 October 2026	FNB Stadium, Johannesburg, South Africa	DR Congo	1–0	2–0	Friendly
2	14 November 2026	Hoima City Stadium, Hoima, Uganda	Botswana	1–0	1–1	2027 Africa Cup of Nations qualification

== Style of play ==
Bogere plays as a forward. African news website Pan-Africa Football wrote in 2025 that "his pace, direct running and willingness to attack space give Uganda a different dimension, particularly against physically and tactically disciplined opponents".

== Honours ==
AGF

- Danish Superliga: 2025–26
