= Nasser Maher =

Egyptian footballer (born 1997)

Nasser Maher ناصر ماهر
- Maher with Al Ahly in 2020

Personal information
- Full name: Nasser Maher Abdelhamid Abdelhamid Elnouhi
- Date of birth: 8 February 1997 (age 29)
- Place of birth: Mansoura, Egypt
- Height: 1.72 m (5 ft 8 in)
- Position: Attacking midfielder

Team information
- Current team: Pyramids
- Number: 22

Youth career
- Al Ahly

Senior career*
Years	Team	Apps	(Gls)
2014–2021	Al Ahly	28	(1)
2016–2017	→ Petrojet (loan)	22	(0)
2017–2018	→ Smouha (loan)	33	(2)
2019–2020	→ Smouha (loan)	26	(7)
2021–2024	Future	44	(5)
2024–2026	Zamalek	42	(6)
2026-	Pyramids	14	(5)

International career^{‡}
	Egypt U20	4	(0)
- Egypt U23
2024–	Egypt	5	(1)
- * Club domestic league appearances and goals ‡ National team caps and goals as of 13 November 2026

Nasser Maher Abdelhamid Abdelhamid Elnouhi (Arabic: ناصر ماهر عبد الحميد; born 8 February 1997) is an Egyptian professional footballer who plays as a forward for Egyptian League club Pyramids and the Egypt national team.

== International career ==
Maher made his debut for the Egypt national team on 10 June 2024 in a World Cup qualifier against Guinea-Bissau at Estádio 24 de Setembro.

=== International ===
Statistics accurate as of match played 13 November 2026.

Egypt
Year	Apps	Goals
2024	4	0
2026	1	1
Total	5	1

As of match played 13 November 2026

Egypt score listed first, score column indicates score after each Maher goal

List of international goals scored by Nasser Maher
No.	Date	Venue	Opponent	Score	Result	Competition
1	13 November 2026	Cairo International Stadium, Cairo, Egypt	Malawi	1–0	5–0	2027 Africa Cup of Nations qualification

== Honours ==
Al Ahly

- Egyptian Premier League: 2013–14, 2015–16, 2018–19
- Egypt Cup: 2019–20
- Egyptian Super Cup: 2015
- CAF Champions League: 2020–21

Zamalek

- Egyptian Premier League: 2025–26
- Egypt Cup: 2024–25
- CAF Super Cup: 2024
- CAF Confederation Cup: 2023–24

Egypt

- Africa U-23 Cup of Nations Champions: 2019
