= Kenean Markneh =

Ethiopian footballer (born 1998)

Personal information
- Full name: Kenean Markneh Maleko
- Date of birth: 30 March 1998 (age 28)
- Place of birth: Adama, Ethiopia
- Height: 1.90 m (6 ft 3 in)
- Position: Attacking midfielder

Team information
- Current team: Al-Arabi SC (Kuwait)

Senior career*
Years	Team	Apps	(Gls)
2016–2017	Addis Ababa City		
2017–2020	Adama City		
2020–2022	Saint George	40	(9)
2022–2024	Defence Force	56	(14)
2024–2025	Al-Madina		
2025–2026	Al-Shabab	22	(21)
2026–	Al-Arabi		

International career^{‡}
2018–	Ethiopia	39	(6)
- * Club domestic league appearances and goals as of 1 July 2023 ‡ National team caps and goals as of 13 November 2026

Kenean Markneh Maleko (Amharic: ቀነአን ማርክነህ; born 30 March 1998) is an Ethiopian professional footballer who plays as an attacking midfielder. He is part of the Ethiopia national team.

== International career ==
Markneh made his international debut with the Ethiopia national team in a 0–0 2019 Africa Cup of Nations qualification tie with Kenya on 10 October 2018.

== Career statistics ==
=== International ===
As of match played 13 November 2026

Appearances and goals by national team and year
National team	Year	Apps	Goals
Ethiopia	2018	1	0
Ethiopia	2019	2	0
Ethiopia	2020	4	0
Ethiopia	2022	6	0
Ethiopia	2023	11	2
Ethiopia	2024	8	2
Ethiopia	2025	2	0
Ethiopia	2026	5	2
Total		39	6

Scores and results list Ethiopia's goal tally first, score column indicates score after each Markneh goal.

List of international goals scored by Kenean Markneh
No.	Date	Venue	Opponent	Score	Result	Competition
1	19 March 2023	Adama Stadium, Adama, Ethiopia	Rwanda	1–0	1–0	Friendly
2	27 March 2023	Prince Moulay Abdellah Stadium, Rabat, Morocco	Guinea	1–1	2–3	2023 Africa Cup of Nations qualification
3	24 March 2024	Addis Ababa Stadium, Addis Ababa, Ethiopia	Lesotho	2–1	2–1	Friendly
4	12 October 2024	Alassane Ouattara Stadium, Abidjan, Ivory Coast	Guinea	1–4	1–4	2025 Africa Cup of Nations qualification
5	27 March 2026	Ben M'Hamed El Abdi Stadium, El Jadida, Morocco	São Tomé and Príncipe	1–0	3–0	2027 Africa Cup of Nations qualification
6	13 November 2026	Zimpeto Stadium, Maputo, Mozambique	Mozambique	1–0	1–0	2027 Africa Cup of Nations qualification
