= Peter Maker =

South Sudanese footballer

Personal information
- Full name: Peter Maker Manyang Mabok
- Date of birth: 1 January 1994 (age 32)
- Place of birth: Juba, Sudan
- Height: 1.98 m (6 ft 6 in)
- Position: Midfielder

Team information
- Current team: Radnički SM

Senior career*
Years	Team	Apps	(Gls)
2015–2018	Al-Ghazal		
2019–2023	Amarat United		
2023–	Radnički SM		

International career^{‡}
2018–	South Sudan	34	(1)
- * Club domestic league appearances and goals ‡ National team caps and goals as of 26 March 2026

Peter Maker Manyang Mabok (born 1 January 1994), known as Peter Maker, is a South Sudanese footballer who plays as a midfielder for Serbian First League club FK Radnički Sremska Mitrovica and captains the South Sudan national team.
