= 2027 Africa Cup of Nations =

36th edition of the Africa Cup of Nations

Kombe la Mataifa ya Afrika 2027
- Official logo

Tournament details
- Host countries: Kenya; Tanzania; Uganda
- Dates: 19 June – 17 July
- Teams: 24
- Venues: 9 (in 7 host cities)

The 2027 Africa Cup of Nations, also referred to as AFCON 2027 or CAN 2027, and for sponsorship purposes as the TotalEnergies CAF Africa Cup of Nations PAMOJA 2027, (Note: Pamoja means together in Swahili, which is one of the official languages of the three host countries.) will be the 36th edition of the African football tournament organised by the Confederation of African Football (CAF) as a biennial tournament. It will be hosted by Kenya, Uganda, and Tanzania from 19 June to 17 July 2027. This event is part of the Africa Cup of Nations' 70th anniversary.

This edition of the tournament will be the first to be hosted by three countries, and the first in five decades to be organised in the CECAFA region, since it was hosted by Ethiopia in 1976. It was also intended to be the last one to be held in odd-numbered years, as CAF announced in December 2025 that AFCON would become a quadrennial tournament from 2028 onwards. This decision was reversed in October 2026, however, with the format remaining biennial.

Morocco are the defending champions after being controversially awarded the 2025 title after an appeal and despite Senegal originally winning 1–0 in the final.

== Host selection ==
On 7 April 2023, CAF chose the host nations for the 2025 and 2027 editions of the tournament on the same day. On 27 September the same year, CAF announced that the 2027 edition will be hosted by Kenya, Tanzania, and Uganda.

=== Bids ===
The bids were as follows:

- Botswana and Zambia
- Nigeria and Benin – Also bid for the 2025 edition
- Senegal
- Kenya / Tanzania / Uganda (selected)

== Qualification ==
=== Qualified teams ===
Qualifying matches will be played during FIFA international windows in March 2026 (preliminary round), September/October 2026 (matchdays 1–2), November 2026 (matchdays 3–4), and March 2027 (matchdays 5–6). The draw was broadcast live on CAF’s official digital platforms and through its broadcast partners.

Team	Qualification method	Date of qualification	Appearance(s)				Previous best performance (Note: Bold text indicates they hosted that edition.)	WR
Team	Qualification method	Date of qualification	Total	First	Last	Streak	Previous best performance	WR
Kenya	Co-hosts	27 September 2023	7th	1972	2019	1	Group stage (1972, 1988, 1990, 1992, 2004, 2019)	TBD
Tanzania	Co-hosts	27 September 2023	5th	1980	2025	3	Round of 16 (2025)	TBD
Uganda	Co-hosts	27 September 2023	9th	1962	2025	2	Runners-up (1978)	TBD
Senegal	Group J winners or runners-up	17 November 2026	19th	1965	2025	7	Champions (2021)	TBD
Mali	Group K winners	17 November 2026	15th	1972	2025	11	Runners-up (1972)	TBD
Cameroon	Group G winners or runners-up	17 November 2026	23rd	1970	2025	7	Champions (1984, 1988, 2000, 2002, 2017)	TBD
Benin	Group F winners or runners-up	17 November 2026	6th	2004	2025	2	Quarter-finals (2019)	TBD
Burkina Faso	Group F winners or runners-up	17 November 2026	15th	1978	2025	4	Runners-up (2013)	TBD
Morocco	Group A winners or runners-up	17 November 2026	21st	1972	2025	6	Champions (1976, 2025)	TBD

== Venues ==
Locations of the host cities of the 2027 Africa Cup of Nations

Since the competition will be jointly hosted by three countries, it was initially reported that each host nation would provide three stadiums, bringing the total number of venues to nine. Kenya, Tanzania and Uganda each proposed two host cities during the early planning stages of the tournament.

Subsequent planning discussions indicated that the tournament could be staged across a broader geographic footprint, with up to ten host cities in total. The number of host cities is now pegged at seven.

In Kenya, Nairobi is now the only host city, following the exclusion of the cities of Eldoret and Kakamega. Tanzania is expected to host matches in Dar es Salaam, Arusha and Zanzibar, after the exclusion of the city of Dodoma, while Uganda will host matches in the cities of Kampala, Hoima and Lira.

List of candidate host cities
City	Stadium	Capacity	Image
(Tanzania) Dar es Salaam	Benjamin Mkapa Stadium	60,000	
(Tanzania) Arusha	Samia Suluhu Hassan Stadium	30,000 (new)	
(Tanzania) Zanzibar	Amaan Stadium	15,000	
(Tanzania) Zanzibar	Fumba Stadium	32,000 (new)	
(Kenya) Nairobi	Raila Odinga International Stadium	60,000 (new)	
(Kenya) Nairobi	Moi International Sports Centre	60,000 (after renovation)	
(Uganda) Kampala	Mandela National Stadium	45,000 (after renovation)	
(Uganda) Hoima	Hoima City Stadium	20,000 (new)	

== See also ==
- 2024 African Nations Championship
- Football in Kenya
- Football in Tanzania
- Football in Uganda
