= Comoros national football team results (2020–present) =

This article provides details of international football games played by the Comoros national football team from 2020 to present.

== Results ==
Key
Win
Draw
Defeat

=== 2020 ===
11 October 2020 Friendly	Libya	1–2	Comoros	Tunis, Tunisia
15:00 UTC+1	Soilihi 45' (o.g.)	Report	Djoudja 71'; M'Changama 90+1'	Stadium: Stade El Menzah; Referee: Mehrez Malki (Tunisia)

11 November 2020 2021 AFCON Q	Kenya	1–1	Comoros	Kasarani, Kenya
19:00 UTC+3	Juma 65'	Report	M'Changama 26'	Stadium: Moi International Sports Centre; Referee: Mutaz Ibrahim (Libya)

15 November 2020 2021 AFCON Q	Comoros	2–1	Kenya	Moroni, Comoros
19:00 UTC+3	Ben 21'; Mattoir 49'	Report	Nyakeya 35'	Stadium: Stade Omnisports de Malouzini; Referee: Bamlak Tessema Weyesa (Ethiopia)

=== 2021 ===
25 March 2021 2021 AFCON Q	Comoros	0–0	Togo	Moroni, Comoros
16:00 UTC+3		Report		Stadium: Stade Omnisports de Malouzini; Referee: Mashood Ssali (Uganda)

29 March 2021 2021 AFCON Q	Egypt	4–0	Comoros	Cairo, Egypt
18:00 UTC+2	Elneny 15'; Sherif 17'; Salah 21', 25'	Report		Stadium: Cairo International Stadium; Referee: Boubou Traore (Mali)

24 June 2021 2021 FIFA Arab Cup	Palestine	5–1	Comoros	Doha, Qatar
20:00 UTC+3	Kharoub 35'; Dabbagh 42'; Seyam 56', 72'; Batran 81'	Report	Djoumoi 5'	Stadium: Jassim bin Hamad Stadium; Referee: Daniele Doveri (Italy)

1 September 2021 Friendly	Comoros	7–1	Seychelles	Moroni, Comoros
	Selemani 31'; Youssouf 34'; Mogni 39', 49'; Ben 63', 75', 83'	Report	Henriette 78'	Stadium: Stade Omnisports de Malouzini; Referee: Elly Sasii (Tanzania)

7 September 2021 Friendly	Comoros	1–0	Burundi	Moroni, Comoros
	M'Changama 47'	Report		Stadium: Stade Omnisports de Malouzini; Referee: Elly Sasii (Tanzania)

13 November 2021 Friendly	Sierra Leone	0–2	Comoros	Sapanca, Turkey
		Report	Ben 34', 89'	Stadium: Sapanca Atatürk Stadyumu

=== 2022 ===
10 January 2022 2021 AFCON	Comoros	0–1	Gabon	Yaoundé, Cameroon
20:00 UTC+1		Report	Boupendza 16'	Stadium: Stade Ahmadou Ahidjo; Referee: Peter Waweru (Kenya)

14 January 2022 2021 AFCON	Morocco	2–0	Comoros	Yaoundé, Cameroon
17:00 UTC+1	Amallah 16'; Aboukhlal 88'	Report		Stadium: Stade Ahmadou Ahidjo; Referee: Sadok Selmi (Tunisia)

18 January 2022 2021 AFCON	Ghana	2–3	Comoros	Garoua, Cameroon
20:00 UTC+1	Boakye 64'; Djiku 77'	Report	Ben Nabouhane 4'; Mogni 61', 85'	Stadium: Roumdé Adjia Stadium; Referee: Boubou Traore (Mali)

24 January 2022 2021 AFCON R16	Cameroon	2–1	Comoros	Yaoundé, Cameroon
20:00 UTC+1	Toko Ekambi 29'; Aboubakar 70'	Report	M'Changama 81'	Stadium: Olembe Stadium; Referee: Bamlak Tessema Weyesa (Ethiopia)

25 March 2022 Friendly	Comoros	2–1	Ethiopia	Moroni, Comoros
17:00 UTC+3	Mattoir 7'; Mohamed 67'	Report	Dagnachew 79'	Stadium: Stade Omnisports de Malouzini; Referee: Nassir Salum (Tanzania)

3 June 2022 2023 AFCON Q	Comoros	2–0	Lesotho	Moroni, Comoros
16:00 UTC+3	M'Changama 59'; Youssouf 81'	Report		Stadium: Stade Omnisports de Malouzini; Referee: Andofetra Rakotojaona (Madagascar)

7 June 2022 2023 AFCON Q	Zambia	2–1	Comoros	Lusaka, Zambia
15:00 UTC+2	Mwepu 45+2'; K. Kangwa 88'	Report	Ben Nabouhane 13'	Stadium: National Heroes Stadium; Referee: Samuel Uwikunda (Rwanda)

22 July 2022 2022 CHAN qualification	Comoros	0–1	South Africa	Saint Pierre, Mauritius
			Shezi 74'	Stadium: Complexe Sportif de Côte d'Or

30 July 2022 2022 CHAN qualification	South Africa	0–0	Comoros	Soweto, South Africa
				Stadium: Dobsonville Stadium

22 September 2022 Friendly	Tunisia	1–0	Comoros	Croissy-sur-Seine, France
16:30 UTC+2	Khenissi 59'	Report		Stadium: Stade Omnisports Du Chemin De Ronde; Referee: Gabriel Henry (France)

27 September 2022 Friendly	Burkina Faso	2–1	Comoros	Casablanca, Morocco
20:00 UTC+1		Report		Stadium: Stade Père Jégo

=== 2023 ===
24 March 2023 2023 AFCON Q	Ivory Coast	3–1	Comoros	Bouake, Ivory Coast
17:00 UTC+0	Kouame 29'; Haller 61'; Aholou (yellow card) 74'; Krasso 89'	Report	M'Dahoma (yellow card) 79'; Djoudja 90+3'	Stadium: Stade Bouaké; Referee: Abdel Aziz Mohamed Bouh (Mauritania)

28 March 2023 2023 AFCON Q	Comoros	0–2	Ivory Coast	Moroni, Comoros
15:00 UTC+3		Report	I. Sangaré 36'; Kessié 58'	Stadium: Stade Omnisports de Malouzini; Referee: Peter Waweru (Kenya)

17 June 2023 2023 AFCON Q	Lesotho	0–1	Comoros	Moroni, Coromos
--:-- UTC+2		Report	M'Changama 90'	Stadium: Stade Omnisports de Malouzini

6 July 2023 2023 COSAFA Cup	Seychelles	0–3	Comoros	Durban, South Africa
15:00		Report	Djambae 27'; Djoudja 39'; Bacar 59'	Stadium: King Zwelithini Stadium

9 July 2023 2023 COSAFA Cup	Zambia	2–1	Comoros	Durban, South Africa
15:00	Mulambia 51'; Kangwanda 74'	Report	Djambae 67'	Stadium: King Zwelithini Stadium

11 July 2023 2023 COSAFA Cup	Malawi	2–0	Comoros	Durban, South Africa
15:00	Kaonga 30' (pen.); Mwaungulu 36'	Report		Stadium: Chatsworth Stadium

9 September 2023 2023 AFCON qualification	Comoros	1–1	Zambia	Moroni, Comoros
22:00 UTC+3	B. Youssouf 45'	Report	Daka 71'	Stadium: Stade Omnisports de Malouzini; Referee: Pacifique Ndabihawenimana (Burundi)

17 October 2023 Friendly	Cape Verde	1–2	Comoros	Istres, France
	Rocha 3'		Almihdhoiri 48'; Mahamoud 86' (pen.)	Stadium: Stade Parsemain

17 November 2023 2026 World Cup Qualification	Comoros	4–2	Central African Republic	Moroni, Comoros
16:00 UTC+3	M'Dahoma 29'; Youssouf 50'; Saïd 58'; Maolida 67'	Report	Abdallah 10' (o.g.); Zahary 74' (o.g.)	Stadium: Stade de Moroni; Referee: Ibrahim Kalilou Traore (Ivory Coast)

21 November 2023 2026 World Cup Qualification	Comoros	1–0	Ghana	Moroni, Comoros
19:00 UTC+3	Maolida 43'	Report		Stadium: Stade de Moroni; Attendance: 11,628; Referee: Abdel Aziz Mohamed Bouh (Mauritania)

=== 2024 ===
22 March Friendly	Comoros	4–0	Uganda	Marrakesh, Morocco
21:00 UTC+0	Saïd 7', 56'; Selemani 8', 66'	Report		Stadium: Marrakesh Stadium

25 March Friendly	Comoros	0–0	Angola	Marrakesh, Morocco
22:00		Report		Stadium: Marrakesh Stadium

7 June 2026 World Cup qualification	Madagascar	2–1	Comoros	Johannesburg, South Africa
18:00 UTC+2	Raveloson 1', 66'	Report	Ben 90+4'	Stadium: FNB Stadium; Referee: Jean-Jacques Ndala Ngambo (DR Congo)

11 June 2026 World Cup qualification	Chad	0–2	Comoros	Oujda, Morocco
17:00 UTC+1		Report	Maolida 59'; Ben 76'	Stadium: Stade Municipal d'Oujda; Referee: Adalbert Diouf (Senegal)

27 June 2024 COSAFA Cup	Zimbabwe	1–0	Comoros	Gqeberha, South Africa
15:00 UTC+2	Tapera 53'	Report		Stadium: Nelson Mandela Bay Stadium

30 June 2024 COSAFA Cup	Kenya	0–2	Comoros	Gqeberha, South Africa
12:00 UTC+2		Report	Djambae 34' (pen.), 49'	Stadium: Isaac Wolfson Stadium

2 July 2024 COSAFA Cup	Comoros	1–0	Zambia	Gqeberha, South Africa
12:00 UTC+2	Ibroihim 61'	Report		Stadium: Nelson Mandela Bay Stadium

5 July 2024 COSAFA Cup Semi-final	Comoros	1–2	Angola	Gqeberha, South Africa
15:00 UTC+2	Ibroihim 84'	Report	Keliano 3'; Depú 23'	Stadium: Nelson Mandela Bay Stadium

7 July 2024 COSAFA Cup 3rd	Comoros	2–2 (1–3 p)	Mozambique	Gqeberha, South Africa
14:00 UTC+2	Hadji 32'; Djoudja 70'	Report	Alfandega 51', 78'	Stadium: Nelson Mandela Bay Stadium
	Penalties
	Djoudja (penalty scored); Ahmed (penalty missed); Mohamed (penalty missed); Ben Ali Soufiane (penalty missed)		(penalty scored) Ferreira; (penalty scored) Jochua; (penalty missed) Cândido; (penalty scored) Alfandega

4 September 2025 AFCON qualification	Comoros	1–1	Gambia	El Jadida, Morocco
16:00 UTC+1	M'Changama 37'	Report	Barrow 45+1'	Stadium: Ben M'Hamed El Abdi Stadium; Referee: Chelangat Sabilla (Uganda)

9 September 2025 AFCON qualification	Madagascar	1–1	Comoros	Tunis, Tunisia
16:00 UTC+1	Andriamatsinoro 9'	Report	M'Changama 41'	Stadium: Hammadi Agrebi Stadium; Referee: Patrice Mebiame (Gabon)

11 October 2025 AFCON qualification	Tunisia	0–1	Comoros	Tunis, Tunisia
20:00 UTC+1		Report	Rafiki Said 63'	Stadium: Hammadi Agrebi Stadium; Referee: Joseph Odey Ogabor (Nigeria)

15 October 2025 AFCON qualification	Comoros	1–1	Tunisia	Abidjan, Ivory Coast
19:00 UTC+0	Selemani 49'	Report	Meriah 69'	Stadium: Felix Houphouet Boigny Stadium; Referee: Tsegay Mogos Teklu (Eritrea)

15 November 2025 AFCON qualification	Gambia	1–2	Comoros	Berkane, Morocco
18:00 UTC+0	Jatta 18'	Report	Saïd 25'; Maolida 90'	Stadium: Berkane Municipal Stadium; Referee: Ibrahim Mutaz (Libya)

18 November 2025 AFCON qualification	Comoros	1–0	Madagascar	Al Hoceima, Morocco
16:00 UTC+0	Bourhane 47'	Report		Stadium: Grand Stade d'Al Hoceima; Referee: Mahmood Ismail (Sudan)

=== 2025 ===
20 March 2026 World Cup qualification	Comoros	0–3	Mali	Berkane, Morocco
22:00 UTC+1		Report	Nene 20'; Doumbia 55', 63'	Stadium: Berkane Municipal Stadium; Referee: Mahmood Ali Mahmood Ismail (Sudan)

25 March 2026 World Cup qualification	Comoros	1–0	Chad	Berkane, Morocco
22:00 UTC+1	Saïd 24'	Report		Stadium: Berkane Municipal Stadium; Referee: Akaté Gnama (Togo)

6 June 2025 COSAFA Cup	Zambia	0–1	Comoros	Bloemfontein, South Africa
18:00 UTC+2		Report	Madi 31'	Stadium: Free State Stadium; Referee: Brighton Chimene (Zimbabwe)

9 June 2025 COSAFA Cup	Comoros	0–0	Botswana	Bloemfontein, South Africa
18:00 UTC+2		Report		Stadium: Dr. Petrus Molemela Stadium; Referee: Arnaud Zafimahatoha (Madagascar)

9 June Friendly	Kosovo	4–2	Comoros	Pristina, Kosovo
19:00	Al. Rrahmani 19', 59', 79'; Asllani 90+2'	Report	Bakari 12'; Saïd 84'	Stadium: Fadil Vokrri Stadium; Referee: Florjan Lata (Albania)

13 June 2025 COSAFA Cup semi-finals	South Africa	3–1	Comoros	Bloemfontein, South Africa
18:00 UTC+2	I. Mohamed 8' (o.g.); Radiopane 14'; Sebelebele 60'	Report	Madi 29'	Stadium: Free State Stadium; Referee: Hillary Hambaba (Zambia)

15 June 2025 COSAFA Cup third-place	Madagascar	0–1	Comoros	Bloemfontein, South Africa
12:00 UTC+2		Report	Ibroihim 77'	Stadium: Free State Stadium; Referee: Akhona Makalima (South Africa)

4 September 2026 World Cup qualification	Mali	3–0	Comoros	Berkane, Morocco
19:00 UTC+0	Dorgeles 45'; K. Doumbia 70' (pen.); Coulibaly 76'	Report (FIFA); Report (CAF)		Stadium: Berkane Municipal Stadium; Referee: Jalal Jiyed (Morocco)

7 September 2026 World Cup qualification	Central African Republic	0–2	Comoros	Meknes, Morocco
17:00 UTC+1		Report (FIFA); Report (CAF)	M'Changama 20'; Maolida 39'	Stadium: Meknes Honor Stadium; Referee: Naim Hosni (Tunisia)

8 October 2026 World Cup qualification	Comoros	1–2	Madagascar	Abidjan, Ivory Coast
16:00 UTC+0	Saïd 81'	Report	Couturier 11'; Raheriniaina 73'	Stadium: Felix Houphouet Boigny Stadium; Referee: Samir Guezzaz (Morocco)

12 October 2026 World Cup qualification	Ghana	1–0	Comoros	Accra, Ghana
19:00 UTC+0	Kudus 47'	Report		Stadium: Accra Sports Stadium; Referee: Pierre Atcho (Gabon)

14 November Friendly	Comoros	1–0	Namibia	Moroni, Comoros
	Vita 85'			Stadium: Stade omnisports de Malouzini

17 November Friendly	Comoros	4–0	Namibia	Moroni, Comoros
19:00 UTC+3	M'Changama 4'; Youssouf 22'; Ahmed 69'; Ben Nabouhane 77'	Report		Stadium: Stade omnisports de Malouzini

26 November 2025 FIFA Arab Cup qualifiers	Comoros	4–4 (4–2 p)	Yemen	Doha, Qatar
19:00 UTC+3	Zakouani 30' (pen.); Anbar 61' (o.g.); Amir 90+1' (pen.), 90+3'		Al-Zubaidi 14'; Mohammedoh 40'; Al-Matari 45+2', 65'	Stadium: Grand Hamad Stadium; Attendance: 1,342; Referee: Cristián Garay (Chile)
	Penalties
	Kari (penalty scored); Zakouani (penalty scored); Djae (penalty scored); Amir (penalty scored)		(penalty scored) Al-Zubaidi; (penalty scored) Al-Golan; (penalty missed) Al-Wasmani; (penalty missed) Mohammedoh

2 December 2025 FIFA Arab Cup Group B	Morocco	3–1	Comoros	Al Rayyan, Qatar
15:00 UTC+3	Bouftini 5'; Tissoudali 11'; El Berkaoui 45+4'	Report	Boulacsoute 56' (o.g.)	Stadium: Khalifa International Stadium; Attendance: 10,246; Referee: Ma Ning (China)

5 December 2025 FIFA Arab Cup Group B	Comoros	1–3	Saudi Arabia	Al Khor, Qatar
21:30 UTC+3	Djoudja 63'	Report	Kanno 45+4', 51'; Al-Dawsari 76'	Stadium: Al Bayt Stadium; Attendance: 32,219; Referee: Juan Calderón (Costa Rica)

8 December 2025 FIFA Arab Cup Group B	Oman	2–1	Comoros	Doha, Qatar
20:00 UTC+3	Al Sabhi 30', 43'	Report	Hamidou 68'	Stadium: Stadium 974; Attendance: 9,348; Referee: Pierre Atcho (Gabon)

21 December 2025 AFCON Group A	Morocco	2–0	Comoros	Rabat, Morocco
20:00 UTC+1	Brahim 55'; El Kaabi 74'	Report		Stadium: Prince Moulay Abdellah Stadium; Attendance: 60,180; Referee: Jean-Jacques Ndala Ngambo (DR Congo)

26 December 2025 AFCON Group A	Zambia	0–0	Comoros	Casablanca, Morocco
18:30 UTC+1		Report		Stadium: Mohammed V Stadium; Referee: Ahmad Heeralall (Mauritius)

29 December 2025 AFCON Group A	Comoros	0–0	Mali	Casablanca, Morocco
20:00 UTC+1		Report	Haidara (red card) 88'	Stadium: Mohammed V Stadium; Referee: Alhadji Allaou Mahamat (Chad)

=== 2026 ===
28 March 2026 FIFA Series	Namibia	0–0 (5–4 p)	Comoros	Astana, Kazakhstan
17:00 UTC+5		Report		Stadium: Astana Arena; Referee: Arman Ismuratov (Kazakhstan)
	Penalties
	Hanamub (penalty scored); Muzeu (penalty scored); Petrus (penalty scored); Rudath (penalty scored); Kambato (penalty scored)		(penalty scored) Kari; (penalty scored) Id. Mohamed; (penalty missed) Ali; (penalty scored) Abdallah; (penalty scored) Mroivili

31 March 2026 FIFA Series	Kazakhstan	1–0	Comoros	Astana, Kazakhstan
--:-- UTC+5	Orazov 4'	Report		Stadium: Astana Arena; Referee: Ishmael Barbara (Malta)

8 June Friendly	Equatorial Guinea	0–1	Comoros	Marrakesh, Morocco
10:30 UTC+1			Youssouf 90+1'

2027 Africa Cup of Nations qualification	Cameroon	v	Comoros

2027 Africa Cup of Nations qualification	Comoros	v	Namibia

2027 Africa Cup of Nations qualification	Comoros	v	Congo

2027 Africa Cup of Nations qualification	Congo	v	Comoros

2027 Africa Cup of Nations qualification	Comoros	v	Cameroon

2027 Africa Cup of Nations qualification	Namibia	v	Comoros

== Head to head records ==
As of 4 October 2026 after the match against Senegal.

Head to head records
Opponent	P	W	D	L	GF	GA	W%	D%	L%
Burkina Faso	1	0	0	1	1	2	0	0	100
Burundi	1	0	0	0	1	0	100	0	0
Cameroon	2	0	0	2	3	5	0	0	100
Central African Republic	2	2	0	0	6	2	100	0	0
Egypt	1	0	0	1	0	4	0	0	100
Equatorial Guinea	1	1	0	0	1	0	100	0	0
Ethiopia	1	1	0	0	2	0	100	0	0
Gabon	1	0	0	1	0	1	0	0	100
Ghana	4	2	1	1	4	4	50	25	25
Kazakhstan	1	0	0	1	0	1	0	0	100
Kenya	2	1	1	0	3	2	50	50	0
Kosovo	1	0	0	1	2	4	0	0	100
Lesotho	7	3	2	2	6	3	100	0	0
Libya	1	1	0	0	2	1	100	0	0
Madagascar	12	2	2	8	8	25	16.67	16.67	66.67
Mali	3	0	1	2	0	6	0	33.33	66.67
Morocco	4	0	1	3	2	7	0	25	75
Namibia	4	3	1	0	6	0	75	25	0
Oman	1	0	0	1	1	2	0	0	100
Palestine	1	0	0	1	1	5	0	0	100
Saudi Arabia	1	0	0	1	1	3	0	0	100
Senegal	1	0	0	1	0	1	0	0	100
Seychelles	1	1	0	0	7	1	100	0	0
Sierra Leone	1	1	0	0	2	0	100	0	0
South Africa	3	0	1	2	1	4	0	33.33	66.67
Togo	1	0	1	0	0	0	0	100	0
Tunisia	1	0	0	1	0	1	0	0	100
Yemen	2	1	1	0	6	4	50	50	0
Zambia	1	0	0	1	1	2	0	0	100
Totals	63	20	12	31	64	91	31.75	19.05	49.21
