= South Africa national soccer B team =

South Africa Development team
- Nickname: Bafana Bafana
- Association: South African; Football Association
- Confederation: CAF (Africa)
- Sub-confederation: COSAFA
- Head coach: Molefi Ntseki
- Captain: Neo Maema
- FIFA code: RSA
First colours	Second colours

FIFA ranking
- Current: N/A

African Nations Championship
- Appearances: 3 (first in 2011)
- Best result: Quarter-finals (2011)

COSAFA Cup
- Appearances: 13 (first in 2008)
- Best result: (gold) Champions (2008), (2016), (2021)

The South Africa national development football team, is a development football (soccer) team, which represents South Africa and is controlled by the South African Football Association, the governing body for football in South Africa. The team's main objective is to give international exposure to home-based players, by allowing them to play 'B-level' internationals. Since the advent of the African Nations Championship, the team now attempts to qualify for and play at the event.

Since 2008 SAFA have sent the team to the COSAFA Cup, instead of the senior team. The team has played at one African Nations Championship and thirteen COSAFA Cups.

== Player eligibility ==
African Championship of Nations regulations require teams to be made up only of players from the association's national leagues. As the team is not an official national team, and does not play in FIFA sanctioned tournaments, clubs are not required to release players for matches. Usually the only Premier Soccer League players released are non-squad members. Many players are selected from the National First Division (second tier) and Vodacom League (third tier).

== Match status ==
Matches played by the team are not classified as 'A-level' internationals. Thus caps awarded for matches do not count as senior national team caps. Matches played by the team also do not count towards FIFA ranking points, even when the team plays other countries' senior national teams.

== Recent and future matches ==
=== 2025 ===
2 March CHAN qualification	South Africa	1–1	Egypt	Bloemfontein, South Africa
17:00	Webber 80'	Report	Mohamed Antar 66'	Stadium: Free State Stadium

8 March CHAN qualification	Egypt	1–3	South Africa	Ismailia, Egypt
17:00	Mohamed Shika 32'	Report	Maema 15'; Mfolozi 26'; Luthuli 50'	Stadium: Suez Canal Stadium

3 May CHAN qualification	Malawi	1–0	South Africa	Lilongwe, Malawi
15:00 UTC+2	Zeliat Nkhoma 88'	Report		Stadium: Bingu National Stadium

11 May CHAN qualification	South Africa	2–0	Malawi	Pretoria, South Africa
15:00 UTC+2	Victor Letsoalo 11'; Neo Maema 86'	Report		Stadium: Loftus Versfeld Stadium

4 June 2025 COSAFA Cup	South Africa	0–1	Mozambique	Bloemfontein, South Africa
15:00 UTC+2		Report	Sumbane 73'	Stadium: Free State Stadium; Referee: Arnaud Zafimahatoha (Madagascar)

7 June 2025 COSAFA Cup	South Africa	2–0	Zimbabwe	Bloemfontein, South Africa
15:00 UTC+2	Dlamini 40' (pen.); Okon 78'	Report		Stadium: Dr. Petrus Molemela Stadium; Referee: Thabang Ketshabile (Botswana)

10 June 2025 COSAFA Cup	South Africa	0–0	Mauritius	Bloemfontein, South Africa
18:00 UTC+2		Report		Stadium: Free State Stadium; Referee: Celso Alvação (Mozambique)

13 June 2025 COSAFA Cup	South Africa	3–1	Comoros	Bloemfontein, South Africa
18:00 UTC+2	I. Mohamed 8' (o.g.); Radiopane 14'; Sebelebele 60'	Report	Madi 29'	Stadium: Free State Stadium; Referee: Hillary Hambaba (Zambia)

15 June 2025 COSAFA Cup	Angola	3–0	South Africa	Bloemfontein, South Africa
15:00 UTC+2	Depú 43', 62'; Milson 81'	Report		Stadium: Free State Stadium; Referee: Brighton Chimene (Zimbabwe)

8 August 2024 African Nations Championship	Algeria	1–1	South Africa	Kampala, Uganda
15:00 UTC+2	Belhocini 29'		Kutumela 45'	Stadium: Mandela National Stadium

11 August 2024 African Nations Championship	Guinea	1–2	South Africa	Kampala, Uganda
15:00 UTC+2	Moussa Camara 37'		Maema 10'; Kutumela 54'	Stadium: Mandela National Stadium

15 August 2024 African Nations Championship	Niger	0–0	South Africa	Kampala, Uganda
15:00 UTC+2				Stadium: Mandela National Stadium

18 August 2024 African Nations Championship	Uganda	3–3	South Africa	Kampala, Uganda
15:00 UTC+2	Ssemugabi 31'; Okello 88' (pen.); Ochaki 90+6' (pen.)		Mphahlele 52'; Kutumela 58'; Ndlondlo 83'	Stadium: Mandela National Stadium

== Tournament records ==
=== African Nations Championship record ===
African Nations Championship
Appearances: 3
Year	Round	Position	Pld	W	D*	L	GF	GA
(Ivory Coast) 2009	Did not qualify							
(Sudan) 2011	Quarter-finals	6th	4	3	0	1	6	4
(South Africa) 2014	Group stage	9th	3	1	1	1	5	5
(Rwanda) 2016	Did not qualify							
(Morocco) 2018	Did not qualify							
(Cameroon) 2020	Did not qualify							
(Algeria) 2022	Did not qualify							
(Kenya) (Tanzania) (Uganda) 2024	Group stage	10th	4	1	3	0	6	5
Total	Quarter-finals	3/7	11	5	4	2	17	14

=== COSAFA Cup record ===
Hosts/Year	Result	GP	W	D*	L	GS	GA
(South Africa) 2008	Champions	3	3	0	0	4	1
(Zimbabwe) 2009	Fourth Place	3	1	1	1	3	2
(Zambia) 2013	Third Place	3	2	1	0	4	2
(South Africa) 2015	Quarter-finals	1	0	1	0	0	0
(Namibia) 2016	Champions	3	2	1	0	9	4
(South Africa) 2017	Quarter-finals	1	0	0	1	0	1
(South Africa) 2018	Quarter-finals	1	0	1	0	0	0
(South Africa) 2019	Quarter-finals	1	0	1	0	2	2
(South Africa) 2021	Champions	6	4	2	0	9	0
(South Africa) 2022	Quarter-finals	1	0	1	0	0	0
(South Africa) 2023	Third Place	5	2	2	1	6	5
(South Africa) 2024	Group stage	3	1	2	3	2	1
(South Africa) 2025	Runners-Up	5	2	1	2	5	5
Total	3 titles						

- Before the 2008 tournament, SAFA sent the senior team.

== Honours ==
- COSAFA Cup: 2008^{1}, 2016, 2021
- ^1Prior to 2008, SAFA sent the senior national team to the COSAFA Cup.
