= Angola national football team results (2020–present) =

- Win Draw Loss

This article provides details of international football games played by the Angola national football team from 2020 to present.

== Results ==
Key
Win
Draw
Defeat

=== 2020 ===
14 November 2020 2021 AFCON qualification	DR Congo	0–0	Angola	Kinshasa, DR Congo
20:00 UTC+1		Report		Stadium: Stade des Martyrs; Referee: Sadok Selmi (Tunisia)

17 November 2020 2021 AFCON qualification	Angola	0–1	DR Congo	Luanda, Angola
17:00 UTC+1		Report	Kebano 64'	Stadium: Estádio 11 de Novembro; Referee: Victor Gomes (South Africa)

=== 2021 ===
25 March 2021 2021 AFCON qualification	Gambia	1–0	Angola	Bakau, Gambia
16:00 UTC+0	Ceesay 62'	Report		Stadium: Independence Stadium; Referee: Adissa Abdul Ligali (Benin)

29 March 2021 2021 AFCON qualification	Angola	2–0	Gabon	Luanda, Angola
17:00 UTC+1	Show 63'; Augusto 69'	Report		Stadium: Estádio 11 de Novembro; Referee: Gehad Grisha (Egypt)

1 September 2021 2022 World Cup qualification	Egypt	1–0	Angola	Cairo, Egypt
21:00 UTC+2	Kafsha 5' (pen.)	Report		Stadium: 30 June Stadium; Referee: Boubou Traore (Mali)

7 September 2021 2022 World Cup qualification	Angola	0–1	Libya	Luanda, Angola
20:00 UTC+1		Report	Al Khouja 43'	Stadium: Estádio 11 de Novembro; Referee: Messie Nkounkou (Congo)

8 October 2021 2022 World Cup qualification	Angola	3–1	Gabon	Luanda, Angola
18:30 UTC+1	Zini 25'; Papel 56'; Buatu 90+1'	Report	Méyé 83'	Stadium: Estádio 11 de Novembro; Referee: Souleiman Ahmed Djamal (Djibouti)

11 October 2021 2022 World Cup qualification	Gabon	2–0	Angola	Franceville, Gabon
14:00 UTC+1	Aubameyang 74'; Moussounda 84'	Report		Stadium: Stade de Franceville; Referee: Maguette N'Diaye (Senegal)

12 November 2021 2022 World Cup qualification	Angola	2–2	Egypt	Luanda, Angola
20:00 UTC+1	Costa 25'; Nzola 35' (pen.)	Report	Elneny 45+1'; Tawfik 59'	Stadium: Estádio 11 de Novembro; Referee: Jean Jacques Ndala Ngambo (Democratic Republic of the Congo)

16 November 2021 2022 World Cup qualification	Libya	1–1	Angola	Benghazi, Libya
15:00 UTC+2	Al Warfali 49' (pen.)	Report	Zini 81'	Stadium: 28 March Stadium; Referee: Beida Dahane (Mauritania)

=== 2022 ===
26 March 2022 Friendly	Angola	3–2	Guinea-Bissau	Rio Maior, Portugal
16:00 UTC+0	Ary Papel 6', 60'; Zini 48'	Report	Zinho Gano 9'; Mauro Rodrigues 90'	Stadium: Estádio Municipal de Rio Maior

29 March 2022 Friendly	Angola	0–0	Equatorial Guinea	Óbidos, Portugal
16:00 UTC+1		Report		Stadium: Estádio Municipal de Óbidos

1 June 2022 2023 AFCON qualification	Angola	2–1	Central African Republic	Luanda, Angola
17:00 UTC+1	Nzola 72'; Dala 76'	Report	Nlend 32'	Stadium: Estádio 11 de Novembro; Referee: Celso Alvação (Mozambique)

5 June 2022 2023 AFCON qualification	Madagascar	1–1	Angola	Antananarivo, Madagascar
19:00 UTC+3	Rakotoharimalala 36'	Report	Dala 43'	Stadium: Mahamasina Municipal Stadium; Referee: Thando Ndzandzeka (South Africa)

17 November 2022 Friendly	Angola	1–0	Botswana	Johannesburg, South Africa
15:00 UTC+2	Jô Paciencia 41'	Report		Stadium: Dobsonville Stadium; Referee: Thando Ndzandzeka (South Africa)

20 November 2022 Friendly	South Africa	1–1	Angola	Nelspruit, South Africa
18:00 UTC+2	Lepasa 28' (pen.)	Report	Zini 20'	Stadium: Mbombela Stadium; Referee: Joshua Bondo (Botswana)

=== 2023 ===
23 March 2023 AFCON qualification	Ghana	1–0	Angola	Kumasi, Ghana
17:00 UTC+0	Semenyo 90+6'	Report		Stadium: Baba Yara Stadium; Referee: Jean Jacques Ndala Ngambo (DR Congo)

27 March 2023 AFCON qualification	Angola	1–1	Ghana	Luanda, Angola
17:00 UTC+1	João 51' (pen.)	Report	Bukari 72'	Stadium: Estádio 11 de Novembro; Referee: Mohamed Maarouf (Egypt)

17 June 2023 AFCON qualification	Central African Republic	1–2	Angola	Douala, Cameroon
15:00 UTC+1	Kondogbia 46'	Report	K. Gaspar 12'; Milson 86'	Stadium: Stade de la Réunification; Referee: Redouane Jiyed (Moroccan)

7 September 2023 AFCON qualification	Angola	0–0	Madagascar	Lubango, Angola
17:00 UTC+1		Report		Stadium: Estádio Nacional da Tundavala; Referee: Jalal Jayed (Morocco)

12 September Friendly	Iran	4–0	Angola	Tehran, Iran
19:00 UTC+3:30	Taremi 8', 16'; Moharrami 20'; Moghanloo 87'			Stadium: Azadi Stadium; Referee: Mohammed Al-Hoaish (Saudi Arabian)

13 October Friendly	Angola	1–1	Mozambique	Albufeira, Portugal
	Gelson 85'	Report	Bangal 75'

17 October Friendly	Angola	0–0	DR Congo	Lisbon, Portugal
		Report

16 November 2026 World Cup qualification	Cape Verde	0–0	Angola	Praia, Cape Verde
18:00 UTC−1		Report		Stadium: Estádio Nacional de Cabo Verde; Referee: Youcef Gamouh (Algeria)

21 November 2026 World Cup qualification	Mauritius	0–0	Angola	Saint Pierre, Mauritius
15:30 UTC+4		Report		Stadium: Côte d'Or National Sports Complex; Attendance: 3,700; Referee: Godfrey Nkhakananga (Malawi)

=== 2024 ===
6 January Friendly	DR Congo	0–0	Angola	Dubai, United Arab Emirates
15:00 UTC+3		Report		Stadium: Shabab Al Ahli Stadium; Referee: Sultan Al–Hammadi (United Arab Emirates)

10 January Friendly	Bahrain	0–3	Angola	Dubai, United Arab Emirates
18:00 UTC+4			Dala 5'; Mabululu 43'; Fortuna 45'	Stadium: Police Officers' Club Stadium

15 January 2023 Africa Cup of Nations	Algeria	1–1	Angola	Bouaké, Ivory Coast
20:00	Bounedjah 18'	Report	Mabululu 68' (pen.)	Stadium: Stade de la Paix; Attendance: 19,740; Referee: Issa Sy (Senegal)

20 January 2023 Africa Cup of Nations	Mauritania	2–3	Angola	Bouaké, Ivory Coast
20:00	Amar 43'; Koita 58'	Report	Dala 30', 50'; Gilberto 53'	Stadium: Stade de la Paix; Attendance: 36,318; Referee: Mohamed Maarouf (Egypt)

23 January 2023 Africa Cup of Nations	Angola	2–0	Burkina Faso	Yamoussoukro, Ivory Coast
20:00	Mabululu 36'; Zini 90+2'	Report		Stadium: Charles Konan Banny Stadium; Attendance: 15,753; Referee: Jean-Jacques Ndala Ngambo (DR Congo)

27 January 2023 Africa Cup of Nations	Angola	3–0	Namibia	Bouaké, Ivory Coast
17:00	Dala 38', 42'; Mabululu 66'	Report		Stadium: Stade de la Paix; Attendance: 28,663; Referee: Dahane Beida (Mauritania)

2 February 2023 Africa Cup of Nations	Angola	0–1	Nigeria	Abidjan, Ivory Coast
17:00	Lookman 41'	Report		Stadium: Felix Houphouet Boigny Stadium; Attendance: 18,757; Referee: Issa Sy (Senegal)

22 March Friendly	Morocco	1–0	Angola	Agadir, Morocco
18:00 UTC+4	Carmo 72' (o.g.)	Report		Stadium: Adrar Stadium; Referee: '

25 March Friendly	Comoros	0–0	Angola	Marrakesh, Morocco
18:00 UTC+4		Report		Stadium: Stade de Marrakech

7 June 2026 FIFA WC qualification	Angola	1–0	Eswatini	Luanda, Angola
20:00 UTC+1	Mabululu 2'	Report		Stadium: Estádio 11 de Novembro; Attendance: 30,000; Referee: Hillary Hambaba (Zambia)

11 June 2026 FIFA WC qualification	Angola	1–1	Cameroon	Luanda, Angola
20:00 UTC+1	Ngadeu-Ngadjui 54' (o.g.)	Report	Mbeumo 11'	Stadium: Estádio 11 de Novembro; Attendance: 40,000; Referee: Mohamed Adel Elsaid (Egypt)

5 September 2025 AFCON qualification	Ghana	0–1	Angola	Kumasi, Ghana
16:00 UTC+0		Report	Felício Milson 90+3'	Stadium: Baba Yara Stadium; Referee: Samuel Uwikunda (Rwanda)

8 September 2025 AFCON qualification	Angola	2–1	Sudan	Luanda, Angola
20:00 UTC+1	Mabululu 51' (pen.); Nteka 81'	Report	Karshoum 55'	Stadium: Estádio 11 de Novembro; Attendance: 35,000; Referee: Jalal Jayed (Morocco)

11 October 2025 AFCON qualification	Angola	2–0	Niger	Luanda, Angola
20:00 UTC+1	Mabululu 75' (pen.); Felicio Milson 85'	Report		Stadium: Estádio 11 de Novembro; Referee: Pierre Atcho (Gabon)

15 October 2025 AFCON qualification	Niger	0–1	Angola	Casablanca, Morocco
17:00 UTC+2	Zini 1'	Report		Stadium: Larbi Zaouli Stadium; Referee: Adalbert Diouf (Senegal)

15 November 2025 AFCON qualification	Angola	1–1	Ghana	Luanda, Angola
19:00 UTC+1	Zini 64'	Report	Ayew 18'	Stadium: Estádio 11 de Novembro; Referee: George Gatogato (Burundi)

18 November 2025 AFCON qualification	Sudan	0–0	Angola	Benghazi, Libya
14:00 UTC+2		Report		Stadium: Benina Martyrs Stadium; Referee: Adissa Ligali (Benin)

=== 2025 ===
20 March 2026 FIFA WC Qualifier	Libya	1–1	Angola	Benghazi, Libya
20:00	Ellafi 74'	Report	Fredy 90+3'	Stadium: Benina Martyrs Stadium; Referee: Lamin Jammeh (Gambia)

25 March 2026 FIFA WC Qualifier	Angola	1–2	Cape Verde	Luanda, Angola
17:00	Dala 50'	Report	Livramento 45+2', 63'	Stadium: Estádio 11 de Novembro; Referee: Mustapha Ghorbal (Algeria)

5 June 2025 COSAFA Cup group stage	Angola	1–1	Namibia	Bloemfontein, South Africa
18:00	Depú 90' (pen.)	Report	Kamberipa 90+7'	Stadium: Free State Stadium; Referee: Hillary Hambaba (Zambia)

8 June 2025 COSAFA Cup group stage	Angola	4–0	Lesotho	Bloemfontein, South Africa
12:00	Vidinho 42'; Depú 44', 52', 90+4'	Report		Stadium: Dr. Petrus Molemela Stadium; Referee: Akhona Makalima (South Africa)

10 June 2025 COSAFA Cup group stage	Malawi	0–1	Angola	Bloemfontein, South Africa
15:00		Report	Nteka 48'	Stadium: Free State Stadium; Referee: Hillary Hambaba (Zambia)

13 June 2025 COSAFA Cup semi-finals	Angola	4–1	Madagascar	Bloemfontein, South Africa
15:00	Depú 19' (pen.), 39'; Zine 74'; Além 86'	Report	Razafimahatana 90+2'	Stadium: Free State Stadium; Referee: Celso Alvação (Mozambique)

15 June 2025 COSAFA Cup final	Angola	3–0	South Africa	Bloemfontein, South Africa
15:00	Depú 43', 62'; Milson 81'	Report		Stadium: Free State Stadium; Referee: Brighton Chimene (Zimbabwe)

4 September 2026 FIFA WC Qualifier	Angola	0–1	Libya	Luanda, Angola
17:00 UTC+1		Report	El Mariamy 48'	Stadium: Estádio 11 de Novembro; Referee: Pierre Jean Nguiene (Congo)

9 September 2026 FIFA WC Qualifier	Angola	3–1	Mauritius	Luanda, Angola
20:00 UTC+1	Nzola 17'; Fredy 57'; Zini 63'	Report	W. François 21'	Stadium: Estádio 11 de Novembro; Referee: Boubou Traoré (Mali)

8 October 2026 FIFA WC Qualifier	Eswatini	2–2	Angola	Lobamba, Eswatini
15:00 UTC+2	Figuareido 48', 54'	Report	Buatu 69'; Papel 80'	Stadium: Somhlolo National Stadium; Referee: Dickens Nyagrowa (Kenya)

13 October 2026 FIFA WC Qualifier	Cameroon	0–0	Angola	Yaoundé, Cameroon
17:00 UTC+1		Report		Stadium: Ahmadou Ahidjo Stadium; Attendance: 20,000; Referee: Djindo Louis Houngnandande (Benin)

14 November Friendly	Angola	0–2	Argentina	Luanda, Angola
17:00 WAT (UTC+1)		Report	Martínez 43'; Messi 82'	Stadium: Estádio 11 de Novembro; Referee: Hillary Hambaba (Zambia)

18 November Friendly	Angola	Cancelled	Guinea-Bissau

18 November Friendly	Angola	3–2	Zambia	Luanda, Angola
17:00 UTC+1	Milson 5'; Luvumbo 41'; Mabululu 58'	Report	Lahne 21'; Sakala 48'	Stadium: Estádio 11 de Novembro; Attendance: 5,000; Referee: Luxolo Badi (South Africa)

17 December NON-FIFA Friendly	Angola	4–1	Mozambique	Almancil, Portugal
16:00 UTC+0	Gelson Dala 25'; Luvumbo 81'; Carmo 90'; Modesto 120'	Report	Witi 104' (pen.)	Stadium: Parque das Cidades Training Center; Attendance: Behind closed doors
Note: The match consisted of two 45-minute halves plus a single, extra period of 30 minutes.

22 December 2025 AFCON RR	South Africa	2–1	Angola	Marrakesh, Morocco
16:00 UTC+1	Appollis 21'; Foster 79'	Report	Show 35'	Stadium: Marrakesh Stadium, Referee: Mahmood Ismail (Sudan)

26 December 2025 AFCON RR	Angola	1–1	Zimbabwe	Marrakesh, Morocco
13:30 UTC+1	Dala 24'	Report	Musona 45+6'	Stadium: Marrakesh Stadium; Referee: Peter Waweru (Kenya)

29 December 2025 AFCON RR	Angola	0–0	Egypt	Agadir, Morocco
17:00 UTC+1		Report		Stadium: Adrar Stadium; Attendance: 16,090; Referee: Clement Franklin Kpan (Ivory Coast)

=== 2026 ===
5 June Friendly	Angola	Cancelled	Botswana	TBD
14:00

5 June Friendly	Angola	1–1	Mauritania	Casablanca, Morocco
20:00	Keliano 85'	Report	Thiam 90+1'	Stadium: Larbi Zaouli Stadium; Referee: Hicham Temsamani (Morocco)

9 June Friendly	Angola	3–0	Central African Republic	Casablanca, Morocco
18:00	Depú 7'; Mabululu 26'; Ary Papel 79'	Report		Stadium: Larbi Zaouli Stadium

TBD 2027 AFCON qualification	Egypt	v	Angola	TBD, Egypt
TBD				Stadium: TBD

TBD 2027 AFCON qualification	Angola	v	Egypt	TBD, Angola
TBD				Stadium: TBD

TBD 2027 AFCON qualification	Angola	v	Malawi	TBD, Angola
TBD				Stadium: TBD

TBD 2027 AFCON qualification	Malawi	v	Angola	TBD, Malawi
TBD				Stadium: TBD

TBD 2027 AFCON qualification	Angola	v	South Sudan	TBD, Angola
TBD				Stadium: TBD

TBD 2027 AFCON qualification	South Sudan	v	Angola	TBD, South Sudan
TBD				Stadium: TBD
