= Chamito =

Mozambican footballer

Personal information
- Full name: Chamito Loborino Alfândega
- Date of birth: 14 January 2004 (age 22)
- Place of birth: Mozambique
- Height: 1.84 m (6 ft 0 in)
- Position: Forward

Team information
- Current team: Belenenses (on loan from Académico Viseu)
- Number: 33

Youth career
- 2021–2023: Têxtil Punguè
- 2025–: Académico Viseu

Senior career*
Years	Team	Apps	(Gls)
2023–2025	Black Bulls	18	(4)
2025–	Académico Viseu	2	(0)
2026	→ Varzim (loan)	16	(4)
2026–	→ Belenenses (loan)	4	(1)

International career^{‡}
2024–	Mozambique	15	(5)
- * Club domestic league appearances and goals as of 13 September 2026 ‡ National team caps and goals as of 29 September 2026

Chamito Loborino Alfândega (born 14 January 2004), known as Chamito, is a Mozambican footballer who plays as a forward for Portuguese Liga 3 club Belenenses on loan from Académico de Viseu.

== Club career ==
In August 2025, Chamito transferred from Black Bulls to Académico de Viseu, being assigned to the under-23 team and joining on a one-year deal with the option of two more. He made his first-team debut in Liga Portugal 2 on 16 August in a goalless draw at home to Paços de Ferreira, playing the last half an hour as a substitute. He spent most of his first season in the under-23 team, with a highlight being a goal and three assists in a 4–0 home win over Vizela on 23 September.

On 16 January 2026, Chamito was sent on loan to Liga 3 club Varzim until the end of the 2025–26 season. He finished the season as a champion of the Liga Revelação from his contributions to Académico's under-23 team, and on 23 July he was loaned to Belenenses also in Liga 3.

== International career ==
Chamito was part of the Mozambique squad that came third at the 2024 COSAFA Cup in South Africa. He scored the equaliser in a 1–1 draw with the host team at the Nelson Mandela Bay Stadium, followed by two goals in a 2–2 draw with Comoros in the bronze medal match and the winning attempt in the penalty shootout; he was one of three Mozambicans named in the Team of the Tournament.

Chamito was called up for the 2025 Africa Cup of Nations in Morocco.

== Career statistics ==
=== International ===
As of match played 29 September 2026

Appearances and goals by national team and year
National team	Year	Apps	Goals
Mozambique	2024	6	3
Mozambique	2025	4	0
Mozambique	2026	5	2
Total		15	5

Scores and results list Mozambique's goal tally first, score column indicates score after each Chamito goal.

List of international goals scored by Chamito
No.	Date	Venue	Opponent	Score	Result	Competition	Ref.
1	26 June 2024	Nelson Mandela Bay Stadium, Gqeberha, South Africa	South Africa	1–1	1–1	2024 COSAFA Cup	
2	7 July 2024	Nelson Mandela Bay Stadium, Gqeberha, South Africa	Comoros	1–1	2–2	2024 COSAFA Cup	
3	7 July 2024	Nelson Mandela Bay Stadium, Gqeberha, South Africa	Comoros	2–2	2–2	2024 COSAFA Cup	
4	29 September 2026	Zimpeto Stadium, Maputo, Mozambique	Sudan	2–0	4–1	2027 Africa Cup of Nations qualification	
5	29 September 2026	Zimpeto Stadium, Maputo, Mozambique	Sudan	4–0	4–1	2027 Africa Cup of Nations qualification	
