= Pedro Gonçalves (football manager) =

Portuguese football manager (born 1976)

Personal information
- Full name: Pedro Valdemar Soares Gonçalves
- Date of birth: 7 February 1976 (age 50)
- Place of birth: Lisbon, Portugal

Team information
- Current team: AS FAR (Head Coach)

Managerial career
- Years: Team
- 1996–1997: Amora (assistant)
- 1997–2000: Cova da Piedade (assistant)
- 2000–2001: Sporting CP (scout)
- 2001–2015: Sporting CP (academy)
- 2015–2018: Primeiro de Agosto (youth)
- 2018–2019: Angola U17
- 2018–2019: Angola U20
- 2019–2025: Angola
- 2026–: AS FAR
Medal record
Men's football
Representing Angola (as manager)
COSAFA Cup
Winner	2024 South Africa
Winner	2025 South Africa

Pedro Valdemar Soares Gonçalves (born 7 February 1976) is a Portuguese professional football manager who is currently in charge of Botola Pro club AS FAR.

== Career ==
Gonçalves began his coaching career at Amora in 1997, still as an assistant. Later, he moved to Cova da Piedade and then joined Sporting in 2000, first as a scout, and then as youth coach in 2001. He coached at Sporting's academy until 2015.

Also in 2015, he left to Angola where he was in charge of the under-15 and under-17 squads of Primeiro de Agosto, and later won the Angolan league. In 2018, he was appointed head coach of the Angola national under-17 team. In the same year, he won the COSOFA Cup and was the protagonist of Angola's first ever qualification to the under-17 World Cup after finishing in third place of the African Cup of Nations. He made history after qualifying for the round of 16.

After coaching the Palancas Negras' U-20 and U-23 teams, Gonçalves became the Angola senior national team coach in 2019. He secured Angola's qualification to the 2022 African Nations Championship, which was held in 2023, finishing the competition in second place of Group D.

In September 2023, he made history once again by qualifying the Angolan national team for the 2023 Africa Cup of Nations, thus becoming the only Palancas Negras coach to qualify for both the African Nations Championship and the African Nations Cup.

Gonçalves led Angola's best-ever group stage performance in the AFCON by picking up 7 points and two wins, something the Palancas Negras have never done before. In Group D with Algeria, Burkina Faso and Mauritania, the Angolans finished first and qualified for the knockout stages of the competition.

Angola's performance was highlighted on BBC Africa with an article, describing how the Angolans exceeded expectations and proved the critics wrong. The Palancas Negras broke another record by winning their first ever AFCON knockout round, beating Namibia 3–0 in the last 16. They were then eliminated in the quarter-finals by Nigeria with a 1–0 defeat.

In June 2024, Gonçalves reached the milestone of 50 matches as manager of the Angola national team. The following month, he led Angola to win the COSAFA Cup, the first in 20 years, also becoming the most successful coach in the history of the Palancas Negras, with 24 victories (the same as Oliveira Gonçalves). Angola secured four wins in five games, including a 5–0 thrashing of Namibia in the tournament final.

On 5 September 2024, Gonçalves broke the record for most victories as Angola head coach, after defeating Ghana 1–0. This result ended Ghana's 24-year unbeaten streak at home in official matches.

On 18 September 2025, Gonçalves and Angola parted ways.

On 25 October 2025, Gonçalves was announced by Tanzanian club Young Africans as their new coach.

== Managerial statistics ==
As of match played 15 February 2026

Managerial record by team and tenure
Team	Nat	From	To	Record					Ref.
Team	Nat	From	To	G	W	D	L	Win %	Ref.
Angola	(Angola)	2019	2025	63	22	27	14	34.92	
Young Africans	(Tanzania)	2025	Present	13	9	2	2	69.23	
Career total				76	31	29	16	40.79	—

== Honours ==
=== As manager ===
Angola U17

- COSAFA U-17 Cup: 2018

Angola

- COSAFA Cup: 2024, 2025
