= Mohamed Chamité =

Comorian football manager

Personal information
- Full name: Mohamed Abderrahmane Chamité
- Place of birth: Comoros

Managerial career
- Years: Team
- 2010–2011: Comoros

Mohamed Abderrahmane Chamité is a Comorian professional football manager.

== Career ==
Since September 2010 until September 2011 he coached the Comoros national football team.
