= Boitumelo Radiopane =

South African soccer player

Personal information
- Full name: Boitumelo Lawrence Radiopane
- Date of birth: 21 January 2002 (age 24)
- Place of birth: Sebokeng, South Africa
- Height: 1.79 m (5 ft 10 in)
- Position: Forward

Team information
- Current team: Orlando Pirates
- Number: 25

Youth career
- Celta Vigo F.C.

Senior career*
Years	Team	Apps	(Gls)
2021–	Orlando Pirates	24	(4)
2022–2024	→ Cape Town Spurs (loan)	16	(7)

International career
2017–2019	South Africa U17	11	(3)
2022–2025	South Africa B	8	(1)
2026–	South Africa		
- * Club domestic league appearances and goals as of 29 October 2026

Boitumelo Lawrence Radiopane (born 21 January 2002) is a South African professional soccer player who plays as a forward for South African Premiership club Orlando Pirates and the South Africa national team.

He was promoted to the first team of the Orlando Pirates for the 2021–22 South African Premiership season after he was the joint top scorer in the 2020–21 season of the PSL Reserve League.

== Early life and career ==
Radiopane was born 21 January 2002 in Sebokeng. He played for Celta Vigo F.C. in Evaton before joining Orlando Pirates at the age of 15. He scored 24 goals during the 2020–21 PSL Reserve League season and was the joint top scorer. He was awarded the DStv Diski Challenge Player of the Season and DStv Diski Challenge Top Goal Scorer at the 2020–21 PSL Awards.

== Club career ==
=== Orlando Pirates (2021–2022) ===
Radiopane's first appearance for the senior team of Orlando Pirates was as a substitute in a match against Lamontville Golden Arrows on 20 November 2021.

=== Cape Town Spurs (2022–2024) ===
He began a two year loan spell at Cape Town Spurs in 2022. He scored seven goals in 11 appearances for the Spurs during the 2022–23 National First Division season before suffering from a broken leg, helping the team earn promotion to the South African Premiership. He made nine appearances during the 2023–24 South African Premiership season before returning to Orlando Pirates in 2024.

=== Orlando Pirates (2024–present) ===
Radiopane returned to Orlando Pirates by June 2024.

He scored his first goal of the 2026–27 season against Sekhukhune United.

== International career ==
=== South Africa B ===
Radiopane was called up to the South Africa national soccer B team for the 2022 COSAFA Cup and the 2025 COSAFA Cup. He scored the second goal in the semi-final against Comoros in the 3–1 win for South Africa in 2025.

=== South Africa ===
Radiopane was called up to the South Africa national team by Pitso Mosimane for the preliminary squad for the 2027 Africa Cup of Nations qualification matches against Kenya.

== Career statistics ==
=== Club ===
As of match played 27 October 2026

Appearances by club, season and competition
Club	Season	League			National Cup (Note: Includes the Nedbank Cup.)		League Cup (Note: Includes the Carling Black Label Cup and the Carling Knockout Cup.)		Continental (Note: Includes CAF Champions League.)		Other (Note: Includes MTN 8.)		Total	
Club	Season	Division	Apps	Goals	Apps	Goals	Apps	Goals	Apps	Goals	Apps	Goals	Apps	Goals
Orlando Pirates	2021–22	South African Premiership	4	0	0	0	1	0	—		0	0	5	0
Cape Town Spurs	2022–23	National First Division	11	7	2	1	0	0	—		—		13	8
Cape Town Spurs	2023–24	South African Premiership	9	0	0	0	0	0	—		—		9	0
Orlando Pirates	2024–25	South African Premiership	12	1	0	0	0	0	4	0	—		16	1
Orlando Pirates	2025–26	South African Premiership	3	0	0	0	0	0	0	0	2	0	5	0
Orlando Pirates	2026–27	South African Premiership	5	3	0	0	1	0	0	0	2	0	7	3
Orlando Pirates	Total		24	4	0	0	2	0	4	0	4	0	34	4
Career total			44	11	2	1	2	0	4	0	4	0	56	12
