= Depú =

Angolan footballer

Personal information
- Full name: Laurindo Dilson Maria Aurélio
- Date of birth: 8 January 2000 (age 26)
- Place of birth: Lobito, Angola
- Height: 1.81 m (5 ft 11 in)
- Position: Forward

Team information
- Current team: Young Africans

Youth career
- 2017–2018: Electro do Lobito

Senior career*
Years	Team	Apps	(Gls)
2019–2020	Académica Lobito	10	(1)
2020–2021	Recreativo Caála	20	(10)
2021–2023	Sagrada Esperança	18	(19)
2023	Petro de Luanda	5	(2)
2023–2025	Gil Vicente	24	(3)
2024–2025	→ Vojvodina (loan)	21	(0)
2025–2026	Radomiak Radom	9	(1)
2026–	Young Africans	0	(0)

International career^{‡}
2021–	Angola	21	(16)
Medal record
Men's football
Representing Angola
COSAFA Cup
Winner	2024 South Africa
Winner	2025 South Africa
- * Club domestic league appearances and goals as of 15:43, 16 December 2025 (UTC) ‡ National team caps and goals as of 08:07, 9 June 2026 (UTC)

Laurindo Dilson Maria Aurélio (born 8 January 2000), commonly known as Depú, is an Angolan professional footballer who plays as a forward for Tanzanian Premier League club Young Africans.

== Club career ==
On 31 January 2023, Depú signed a 3 1/2-year contract with Gil Vicente in Portugal.

On 11 September 2024, Depú signed a one-year loan deal with Serbian SuperLiga club Vojvodina. With the club, he reached the final of the 2024–25 Serbian Cup, which was lost against Red Star Belgrade.

On 30 June 2025, Depú joined Polish Ekstraklasa club Radomiak Radom on a three-year deal, for an undisclosed fee.

On 14 January 2026, Depú signed for Tanzanian Premier League club Young Africans, where he was reunited with Pedro Gonçalves, who had managed him in the Angola national team.

== Career statistics ==
=== Club ===
As of match played 28 November 2025

Appearances and goals by club, season and competition
Club	Season	League			National cup (Note: Includes Taça de Angola, Serbian Cup, Polish Cup)		Continental		Other		Total	
Club	Season	Division	Apps	Goals	Apps	Goals	Apps	Goals	Apps	Goals	Apps	Goals
Académica do Lobito	2019–20	Girabola	10	1	3	0	—		—		13	1
Recreativo da Caála	2020–21	Girabola	20	10	1	1	—		—		21	11
Sagrada Esperança	2021–22	Girabola	18	19	0	0	5 (Note: Appearances in CAF Champions League)	0	—		23	19
Petro de Luanda	2022–23	Girabola	5	2	0	0	—		—		5	2
Gil Vicente	2022–23	Primeira Liga	5	0	—		—		—		5	0
Gil Vicente	2023–24	Primeira Liga	16	3	0	0	—		0	0	16	3
Gil Vicente	2024–25	Primeira Liga	3	0	—		—		—		3	0
Gil Vicente	Total		24	3	0	0	—		0	0	24	3
Vojvodina (loan)	2024–25	Serbian SuperLiga	21	0	4	1	—		—		25	1
Radomiak Radom	2025–26	Ekstraklasa	9	1	1	0	—		—		10	1
Career total			107	36	9	2	5	0	0	0	121	38

=== International ===
As of match played 9 June 2026

National team	Year	Apps	Goals
Angola	2021	1	0
Angola	2023	2	2
Angola	2024	10	5
Angola	2025	6	8
Angola	2026	2	1
Total		21	16

Scores and results list Angola's goal tally first, score column indicates score after each Depú goal.

List of international goals scored by Depú
No.	Date	Venue	Opponent	Score	Result	Competition
1	16 January 2023	Miloud Hadefi Stadium, Oran, Algeria	Mali	1–0	3–3	2022 African Nations Championship
2	16 January 2023	Miloud Hadefi Stadium, Oran, Algeria	Mali	2–1	3–3	2022 African Nations Championship
3	1 July 2024	Isaac Wolfson Stadium, Gqeberha, South Africa	Seychelles	1–0	3–2	2024 COSAFA Cup
4	1 July 2024	Isaac Wolfson Stadium, Gqeberha, South Africa	Seychelles	2–2	3–2	2024 COSAFA Cup
5	3 July 2024	Nelson Mandela Bay Stadium, Gqeberha, South Africa	Lesotho	1–1	3–1	2024 COSAFA Cup
6	5 July 2024	Nelson Mandela Bay Stadium, Gqeberha, South Africa	Comoros	2–0	2–1	2024 COSAFA Cup
7	7 July 2024	Nelson Mandela Bay Stadium, Gqeberha, South Africa	Namibia	2–0	5–0	2024 COSAFA Cup
8	5 June 2025	Free State Stadium, Bloemfontein, South Africa	Namibia	1–0	1–1	2025 COSAFA Cup
9	8 June 2025	Dr. Petrus Molemela Stadium, Bloemfontein, South Africa	Lesotho	2–0	4–0	2025 COSAFA Cup
10	8 June 2025	Dr. Petrus Molemela Stadium, Bloemfontein, South Africa	Lesotho	3–0	4–0	2025 COSAFA Cup
11	8 June 2025	Dr. Petrus Molemela Stadium, Bloemfontein, South Africa	Lesotho	4–0	4–0	2025 COSAFA Cup
12	13 June 2025	Free State Stadium, Bloemfontein, South Africa	Madagascar	1–0	4–1	2025 COSAFA Cup
13	13 June 2025	Free State Stadium, Bloemfontein, South Africa	Madagascar	2–0	4–1	2025 COSAFA Cup
14	15 June 2025	Free State Stadium, Bloemfontein, South Africa	South Africa	1–0	3–0	2025 COSAFA Cup
15	15 June 2025	Free State Stadium, Bloemfontein, South Africa	South Africa	2–0	3–0	2025 COSAFA Cup
16	9 June 2026	Larbi Zaouli Stadium, Casablanca, Morocco	Central African Republic	1–0	3–0	Friendly

== Honours ==
Sagrada Esperança

- Supertaça de Angola: 2021–22

Angola

- COSAFA Cup: 2024, 2025

Individual

- COSAFA Cup top scorer: 2024, 2025
- COSAFA Cup Best Player: 2025

Records

- All-time COSAFA Cup top goalscorer: 13 goals
