= Pierre Jacky =

French footballer and manager (born 1960)

Personal information
- Date of birth: 5 October 1960 (age 66)
- Place of birth: Ingwiller, France
- Position: Midfielder

Managerial career
- Years: Team
- 1985: Comoros
- 1997–2003: France (futsal) (assistant)
- 2004–2009: France (futsal)

Pierre Jacky (born 5 October 1960) is a French former professional football player and manager.

== Career ==
Jacky was born in Ingwiller. After a steady career in amateur football (being still selected teams of France school and university, with which he was vice-world champion in Mexico, 1982) in the 1970s and early 1980s and an interlude of two years as a professor of physical education and sports (EPS) in college, Pierre Jacky became a football coach.

In 1985, he was invited for the post of head coach of the Comoros national football team. Later he became deputy director of the training center of the Racing Club de Strasbourg until 1987. Next, he led the amateur club FC Strasbourg Koenigshofen 06.

He then dedicated to futsal, while developing and became, in 1997, assistant coach of the new France national futsal team. In 2004, he took the reins and became a manager.
