= Rushwin Dortley =

South African soccer player

Personal information
- Full name: Rushwin Wayne Dortley
- Date of birth: 2 May 2002 (age 24)
- Place of birth: Belhar, South Africa
- Height: 1.92 m (6 ft 4 in)
- Position: Defender

Team information
- Current team: Kaizer Chiefs
- Number: 14

Senior career*
Years	Team	Apps	(Gls)
2020–2024	Cape Town Spurs	80	(2)
2024–	Kaizer Chiefs	18	(0)

International career^{‡}
- South Africa U-23
2024–	South Africa	5	(1)
- * Club domestic league appearances and goals as of 4 January 2026 ‡ National team caps and goals as of 15:20, 10 September 2024 (UTC)

Rushwin Dortley (born 2 May 2002) is a South African professional soccer player who plays as a defender for Kaizer Chiefs in the South African Premiership and the South Africa national team.

== Club career ==
Playing several seasons in the National First Division, Dortley gained national attention when Kaizer Chiefs reportedly bid 3 million rand to sign him. He was an interesting prospect as a left-footed central defender. Following reports that "the player’s representatives have decided to rather secure a move to Europe", Dortley went on trial with FC Nordsjælland in the summer of 2022.

== International career ==
Dortley has captained South Africa U-23. On 26 June 2024, he made his debut for the senior squad in a 2024 COSAFA Cup match, scoring in a 1–1 draw with Mozambique.
