= Ali Mbaé Camara =

Comorian footballer and manager

Personal information
- Date of birth: April 13, 1970 (age 56)
- Place of birth: Comoros
- Position: Midfielder

Senior career*
Years	Team	Apps	(Gls)
1989–1992	RC Lens		

Managerial career
- 2006–2007: Comoros
- 2011–2013: Comoros
- * Club domestic league appearances and goals

Ali Mbaé Camara is a Comorian professional football player and football manager. From 2006 to 2007 and from October 2011 to December 2013 he coached Comoros national football team.
