= Younes Zerdouk =

French footballer (born 1973)

Personal information
- Date of birth: 12 July 1973 (age 53)
- Place of birth: Joigny, France
- Height: 1.76 m (5 ft 9 in)
- Position: Midfielder

Youth career
- ASPTT Auxerre
- Auxerre

Senior career*
Years	Team	Apps	(Gls)
1994–1998	Bourges		
1998–2000	Romorantin		
2000–2001	Angers	29	(0)
2001–2002	Romorantin		
2002–2004	Bourges	65	(9)
2004–2005	Trélissac	31	(1)
2005–2008	Stade Briochin		

Managerial career
- 2008–2015: Academy JMG BELGIUM
- 2015–2016: Lierse
- 2016–2020: Wadi Degla
- 2022–2023: Comoros
- * Club domestic league appearances and goals

Younes Zerdouk (born 12 July 1973) is a French football manager and former player.

== Career ==
Zerdouk began his career in the youth ranks at Auxerre and Saint-Doulchard, before joining Bourges in 1994. In 1998, Zerdouk signed for Romorantin, playing for the club for one season. In 2000, Zerdouk joined Angers to sign his first professional contract. At Angers, Zerdouk made 29 Division 2 appearances as the club finished bottom of the 2000–01 French Division 2. Following a single season at Angers, Zerdouk signed for BLOIS FOOT 41, before moving back to Bourges in 2002. After nine goals in 65 league goals for Bourges, Zerdouk signed for Trélissac, where he scored once in 31 games. Zerdouk finished his career with a three-season spell at Stade Briochin.

== Managerial career ==
Following his playing career, Zerdouk moved into coaching.Younes was director of the JMG academy from 2008 to 2015. In 2015, he finished champion of the professional reserve championship with Lierse for the first time in the club's history.

In 2016, Zerdouk was appointed manager of Belgian club Lierse. Zerdouk managed Lierse for six games, then he joined the Wadi Degla Club as training director.

In October 2017, Zerdouk joined the Comoros' coaching staff as assistant coach . On 7 March 2022, Zerdouk was appointed coach of the Comoros national team .
