= Neo Maema =

South African soccer player

Personal information
- Date of birth: 1 December 1995 (age 30)
- Place of birth: Bloemfontein, South Africa
- Height: 1.67 m (5 ft 6 in)
- Position: Attacking midfielder

Team information
- Current team: Simba S.C.
- Number: 12

Senior career*
| Years | Team | Apps | (Gls) |
| 2018–2021 | Bloemfontein Celtic | 60 | (3) |
| 2021– | Mamelodi Sundowns | 64 | (9) |
| 2025– | → Simba S.C. (loan) | | |

International career
| 2024– | South Africa A | | |
- * Club domestic league appearances and goals as of 30 June 2024

Neo Maema (born 1 December 1995) is a South African professional soccer player who plays as an attacking midfielder for Tanzanian Premier League side Simba Sports Club on loan from Mamelodi Sundowns.

== Career ==
Maema started his career at Bloemfontein Celtic aged 22. After 60 appearances and 3 goals for Celtic, he joined Mamelodi Sundowns on a five-year deal in summer 2021.

=== Simba ===
He joined Tanzanian Premier League side Simba S.C. on loan at the beginning to the 2025/26 season. He made his debut on "Simba Day" in a 2–0 win over Kenyan champions Gor Mahia.

== International career ==
Maema captained the South Africa A at the 2025 CHAN. He scored the winning goal qualification to send the team to the finals against Malawi.

== Style of play ==
Maema is a left-footed attacking midfielder.

== Honours ==
Mamelodi Sundowns

- South African Premiership: 2021/22, 2022/23, 2023/2024, 2024/25
