= Kamogelo Sebelebele =

South African soccer player (born 2002)

Personal information
- Full name: Mike Kamogelo Sebelebele
- Date of birth: 21 July 2002 (age 24)
- Place of birth: Tembisa, Gauteng, South Africa
- Height: 1.66 m (5 ft 5 in)
- Position: Midfielder

Team information
- Current team: Orlando Pirates
- Number: 35

Youth career
- –2022: TS Galaxy Youth

Senior career*
Years	Team	Apps	(Gls)
2022–2025	TS Galaxy F.C.	98	(5)
2025–	Orlando Pirates	28	(6)

International career^{‡}
2025	South Africa B	5	(1)
2025–	South Africa	7	(0)
- * Club domestic league appearances and goals as of 3 January 2026 ‡ National team caps and goals as of 05:27, 3 October 2026 (UTC)

Mike Kamogelo Sebelebele (born 21 July 2002) is a South African soccer player who plays as a winger for South African Premiership side Orlando Pirates and the South Africa national team.

== Club career ==
=== TS Galaxy ===
Sebelebele played for the TS Galaxy Academy and was promoted to the senior team in March 2022. His breakout season came in the 2024/25 season where he made 29 appearances and scored five goals with two assists.

=== Orlando Pirates ===
He joined Orlando Pirates before the start of the 2025/26 season. He scored scored both goals in the MTN 8 against Sundowns to force the game into penalties where Pirates eventually won. He scored his first league goal for the Buccaneers when he scored the winning goal in a 1–0 win against Stellenbosch where he later received the August goal of the month award for this strike.

== International career ==
He competed for the South Africa B team at the 2025 COSAFA Cup. He got his senior call up for the World Cup qualifiers against Lesotho and Nigeria in September 2025.

On 28 May 2026, he was selected by manager Hugo Broos to represent his nation at the 2026 FIFA World Cup.

=== International ===
As of match played 30 September 2026

Appearances and goals by national team and year
National team	Year	Apps	Goals
South Africa B	2025	5	1
South Africa	2025	2	0
South Africa	2026	5	0
Total		12	1

Scores and results list South Africa's goal tally first.

No.	Date	Venue	Opponent	Score	Result	Competition
1.	13 June 2025	Free State Stadium, Bloemfontein, South Africa	Comoros	3–1	3–1	2025 COSAFA Cup

== Honours ==
South Africa

- COSAFA Cup: Runners-Up: 2025

Orlando Pirates

- South African Premiership: 2025–26
- MTN 8: 2025
- Carling Knockout: 2025

Individual

- South African Premiership Goal of the Month: August 2025
