= Iddy Nado =

Tanzanian footballer

Personal information
- Full name: Iddy Seleman Nado
- Date of birth: 3 November 1990 (age 36)
- Place of birth: Dodoma, Kondoa
- Position: Midfielder

Team information
- Current team: Azam F.C.

Senior career*
Years	Team	Apps	(Gls)
2013–2015	Ashanti United		
2017–2019	Mbeya City		
2019–	Azam F.C.	83+	(29+)

International career^{‡}
2019–	Tanzania	28	(1)
- * Club domestic league appearances and goals ‡ National team caps and goals as of 19:23, 16 June 2026 (UTC)

Iddy Nado (born 3 November 1990) is a Tanzanian professional footballer who plays as a midfielder for Azam F.C. of the Tanzanian Premier League.

== International career ==
=== International goals ===
Scores and results list Tanzania's goal tally first.

No.	Date	Venue	Opponent	Score	Result	Competition
1.	11 June 2025	Free State Stadium, Bloemfontein, South Africa	Eswatini	1–1	2–1	2025 COSAFA Cup
