= Pedro Bondo =

Angolan footballer (born 2004)

Personal information
- Full name: Pedro Bondo Francisco
- Date of birth: 16 November 2004 (age 21)
- Place of birth: Luanda, Angola
- Height: 1.72 m (5 ft 8 in)
- Position: Left-back

Team information
- Current team: Famalicão
- Number: 28

Youth career
- 2019–2020: Petro de Luanda

Senior career*
Years	Team	Apps	(Gls)
2020–2025	Petro de Luanda	75	(1)
2023–2024	→ Sporting CP B (loan)	23	(1)
2025–	Famalicão	30	(1)

International career^{‡}
2024–	Angola	13	(1)
- * Club domestic league appearances and goals as of 19 September 2026 ‡ National team caps and goals as of 6 October 2026

Pedro Bondo Francisco (born 16 November 2004) is an Angolan professional football player who plays as a left-back for Primeira Liga club Famalicão and the Angola national team.

== Career ==
Bondo began his senior career with Petro de Luanda in the Girabola in 2020, and helped them win three Girabolas, two Taça de Angolas and one Supertaça de Angola. On 8 July 2023, he joined Sporting CP B in the Liga 3 for the season. On 23 January 2025, he joined Famalicão in the Primeira Liga on a contract until 2029.

== International career ==
Bondo was part of the Angola national team that won the 2024 COSAFA Cup, and scored a goal in the final - a 5–0 win over Namibia on 7 July 2024. He was part of the squad for the 2024 African Nations Championship qualification matches and helped the team qualify for the final tournament.

On 3 December 2025, Bondo was called up to the Angola squad for the 2025 Africa Cup of Nations.

== Personal life ==
At the age of 19, Bondo married Idineth Ricardo on 1 July 2024.

== Honours ==
Petro de Luanda

- Girabola: 2021–22, 2022–23
- Taça de Angola: 2021–22, 2022–23
- Supertaça de Angola: 2023

Angola national team

- COSAFA Cup: 2024
