= Ibrahim Madi =

Footballer (born 1998)

Personal information
- Date of birth: 19 May 1998 (age 28)
- Place of birth: Marseille, France
- Height: 1.75 m (5 ft 9 in)
- Position: Forward

Team information
- Current team: Istres
- Number: 11

Senior career*
Years	Team	Apps	(Gls)
2016–2018	Nîmes B	33	(4)
2018–2021	Martigues	51	(8)
2021–2022	Athlético Marseille	14	(3)
2022–2023	Stade Poitevin	18	(2)
2023–	Istres	26	(7)

International career^{‡}
2019–	Comoros	7	(2)
- * Club domestic league appearances and goals as of 20:19, 9 December 2024 (UTC) ‡ National team caps and goals as of 20:54, 18 June 2025 (UTC)

Ibrahim Madi (born 19 May 1998) is a professional footballer who plays as a forward for National 2 club Istres. Born in France, he plays for the Comoros national team.

== International career ==
Madi made his debut with the Comoros national team in a 2–0 2022 FIFA World Cup qualification loss to Togo on 10 September 2019.

After a five year absence, Madi was called up to the Comoros national team for the 2025 COSAFA Cup and during Comoros' opening game, he scored his first goal during a 1–0 win against Zambia on 6 June 2025. Seven days later, he scored again against South Africa.

== Career statistics ==
=== International ===
As of match played 13 June 2025.

National team	Year	Apps	Goals
Comoros	2019	1	0
Comoros	2020	2	0
Comoros	2021	0	0
Comoros	2022	0	0
Comoros	2023	0	0
Comoros	2024	0	0
Comoros	2025	4	2
Total		7	2

Comoros score listed first, score column indicates score after each Madi goal.

List of international goals scored by Ibrahim Madi
No.	Date	Venue	Cap	Opponent	Score	Result	Competition	Ref.
1	6 June 2025	Free State Stadium, Bloemfontein, South Africa	5	Zambia	1–0	1–0	2025 COSAFA Cup	
2	13 June 2025	Free State Stadium, Bloemfontein, South Africa	6	South Africa	1–2	1–3	2025 COSAFA Cup	
