= Ibroihim Djoudja =

Comorian footballer

Personal information
- Full name: Ibroihim Youssouf Djoudja
- Date of birth: 6 May 1994 (age 32)
- Place of birth: Itsandra, Comoros
- Height: 1.76 m (5 ft 9 in)
- Position: Forward

Team information
- Current team: African Stars

Senior career*
Years	Team	Apps	(Gls)
2013	Hairu FC		
2014–2016	Chirazienne FC		
2017	Volcan Club de Moroni	11	(6)
2017	Enfants des Comores		
2017–2018	Volcan Club de Moroni	15	(7)
2018–2020	African Stars	37	(18)
2020	Volcan Club de Moroni	14	(5)
2021	FC Nouadhibou	10	(1)
2021–2022	TS Sporting	10	(2)
2022–	African Stars		

International career^{‡}
2017–	Comoros	46	(11)
- * Club domestic league appearances and goals as of 4 July 2024 ‡ National team caps and goals as of 7 July 2024

Ibroihim Youssouf Djoudja (born 6 May 1994) is a Comorian professional footballer who plays for Namibian club African Stars and the Comoros national team.

== International career ==
Djoudja debuted internationally for the Comoros national team in a COSAFA Cup on 27 May 2018 in a 1–1 draw against Seychelles. A year later at another COSAFA Cup, Djoudja scored his first goal for Comoros against Eswatini resulting a 2–2 draw.

On 6 September 2019, Djoudja appeared for the 2022 FIFA World Cup qualification set in Qatar and scored his first major goal in the competition resulting a 1–1 draw against Togo.

== Career statistics ==
Scores and results list Comoros's goal tally first, score column indicates score after each Djoudja goal.

List of international goals scored by Ibroihim Djoudja
No.	Date	Venue	Opponent	Score	Result	Competition
1	15 July 2017	Stade de Moroni, Moroni, Comoros	Lesotho	1–0	2–0	2018 African Nations Championship qualification
2	27 May 2019	King Zwelithini Stadium, Umlazi, South Africa	Eswatini	2–2	2–2	2019 COSAFA Cup
3	29 May 2019	King Zwelithini Stadium, Umlazi, South Africa	Mauritius	1–0	2–1	2019 COSAFA Cup
4	20 July 2019	Stade George V, Curepipe, Mauritius	Maldives	1–0	3–0	2019 Indian Ocean Island Games
5	6 September 2019	Stade de Moroni, Moroni, Comoros	Togo	1–1	1–1	2022 FIFA World Cup qualification
6	11 October 2020	El Menzah Stadium, Tunis, Tunisia	Libya	1–1	2–1	Friendly
7	24 March 2023	Stade de la Paix, Bouaké, Ivory Coast	Ivory Coast	1–3	1–3	2023 Africa Cup of Nations qualification
8	6 July 2023	King Zwelithini Stadium, Umlazi, South Africa	Seychelles	1–0	3–0	2023 COSAFA Cup
9	2 July 2024	Nelson Mandela Bay Stadium, Gqeberha, South Africa	Zambia	1–0	1–0	2024 COSAFA Cup
10	5 July 2024	Nelson Mandela Bay Stadium, Gqeberha, South Africa	Angola	1–2	1–2	2024 COSAFA Cup
11	7 July 2024	Nelson Mandela Bay Stadium, Gqeberha, South Africa	Mozambique	2–1	2–2 (1–3 p)	2024 COSAFA Cup
12	15 June 2025	Free State Stadium, Bloemfontein, South Africa	Madagascar	1–0	1–0	2025 COSAFA Cup
13	5 December 2025	Al Bayt Stadium, Al Khor, Qatar	Saudi Arabia	1–2	1–3	2025 FIFA Arab Cup
