= Raouf Mroivili =

Footballer (born 1999)

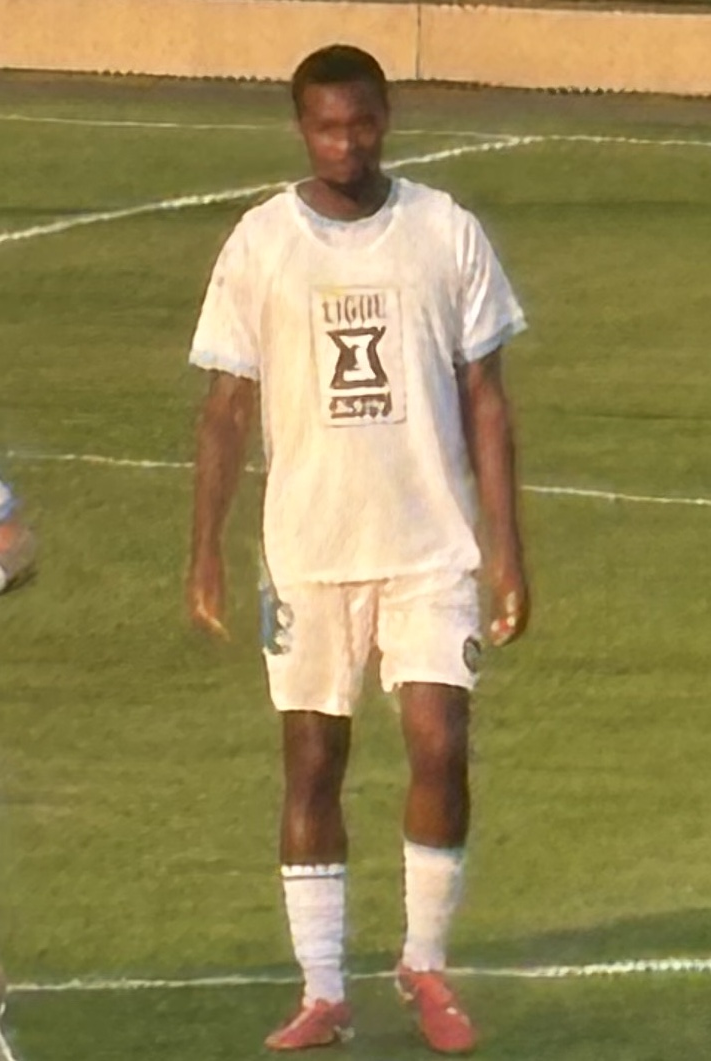
- Mroivili in August 2026

Personal information
- Date of birth: 14 January 1999 (age 27)
- Place of birth: Marseille, France
- Height: 1.81 m (5 ft 11 in)
- Position: Midfielder

Team information
- Current team: Le Puy-en-Velay
- Number: 8

Youth career
- 2005–2009: Marseille Consolat
- 2009–2014: Air Bel
- 2014–2015: Istres
- 2015–2016: Marseille

Senior career*
Years	Team	Apps	(Gls)
2016–2017	Marseille II	17	(0)
2018–2020	Metz II	2	(0)
2019–2020	→Seraing (loan)	17	(4)
2021	Monaco II	0	(0)
2021–2022	Guingamp II	21	(1)
2022–2023	Bourges	17	(2)
2023–2025	Jura Sud	28	(4)
2025–2026	Villefranche	36	(7)
2026–	Le Puy-en-Velay	2	(0)

International career^{‡}
2015–2016	France U17	9	(0)
2016–2017	France U17	6	(0)
2017	France U17	3	(1)
2023–	Comoros	3	(0)
- * Club domestic league appearances and goals as of 11:43, 15 August 2026 (UTC) ‡ National team caps and goals as of 16:29, 12 September 2025 (UTC)

Raouf Mroivili (born 14 January 1999) is a professional footballer who plays as a midfielder for Ligue 3 club Le Puy-en-Velay. Born in France, he plays for the Comoros national team.

== Club career ==
Mroivili is a product of the youth academies of Marseille Consolat, Air Bel, Istres, and Marseille. He debuted with Marseille's reserves in 2016. He joined the reserves of Metz in 2018, and on 24 May 2019 signed his first professional contract with the club for 1 season, with the option to extend for 2 more. On 1 September 2019, he was loaned to the Belgian Division 1 club Seraing on a year-long loan. After his loan ended, he opted not to extend his contract with Metz and spent the 2021–22 season with the reservesGuingamp in the Championnat National 2. On 13 December 2022, he transferred to Jura Sud, where he eventually became captain.

On 8 January 2025, Mroivili transferred to Villefranche in the Championnat National.

== International career ==
Born in France, Mroivili is of Comorian descent and holds dual Comorian-French citizenship. He is a youth international for France, having been called up to the France U17s for the 2016 UEFA European Under-17 Championship. He was first called up to the Comoros national team for a set of friendlies in June 2025.

On 11 December 2025, Mroilvili was called up to the Comoros squad for the 2025 Africa Cup of Nations.
