= 2025 COSAFA Cup =

24th edition of the COSAFA Cup

COSAFA Cup 2025

Tournament details
- Host country: South Africa
- City: Bloemfontein
- Dates: 4 – 15 June
- Teams: 14 (from 2 sub-confederations)
- Venues: 2 (in 1 host city)

Final positions
- Champions: Angola (5th title)
- Runners-up: South Africa
- Third place: Comoros
- Fourth place: Madagascar

Tournament statistics
- Matches played: 22
- Goals scored: 44 (2 per match)
- Top scorer(s): (Angola) Depú (8 goals)
- Best player: (Angola) Depú
- Best goalkeeper: (Angola) Neblú
- Fair play award: South Africa

The 2025 COSAFA Cup, officially known as the 2025 Hollywoodbets COSAFA Cup (for sponsorship purposes), was the 24th edition of the COSAFA Cup, the annual international football championship organised by COSAFA for the senior men's national teams of their member associations. South Africa hosted the tournament for the eighth consecutive year, from 4 to 15 June 2025. The tournament involved 14 teams. This tournament was not recognized by FIFA as an official A-match.

Angola were the defending champions, having secured their fourth title in the previous edition.

== Participation ==
All 14 COSAFA member nations are eligible to participate in the competition, with members from other regional confederations also eligible to join by invitation, either to complete the number of participating teams or to replace any that withdrew.

=== Participating teams ===
In May 2025, it was announced that 13 of the 14 COSAFA member nations would take part in the tournament, with Morocco from UNAF completing the lineup in place of Seychelles, who did not return for this edition. On 29 May, Morocco withdrew from the competition and were replaced by Tanzania from CECAFA. Of the 14 participating nations, Madagascar and Mauritius returned to the competition after missing the previous two and one editions, respectively.

Team	Type	App	Previous best performance	WR (Note: As of the latest FIFA World Ranking, published on 3 April 2025.)
Angola	A	20th	Champions (1999, 2001, 2004, 2024)	87
Botswana	A	24th	Runners-up (2016, 2019)	136
Comoros	A'	8th	Fourth place (2024)	105
Eswatini	A	24th	Third place (2016, 2021), Semi-finals (1999, 2002, 2003)	155
Lesotho	A	24th	Runners-up (2000, 2023)	148
Madagascar	A'	13th	Third place (2015)	115
Malawi	A'	23rd	Runners-up (2002, 2003)	132
Mauritius	A	19th	Quarter-finals (2001, 2004)	178
Mozambique	U23	24th	Third place (1997, 2009, 2024)	96
Namibia	A	24th	Champions (2015)	108
South Africa	A'	23rd	Champions (2002, 2007, 2008, 2016, 2021)	56
Tanzania	A'	4th	Third place (2017)	105
Zambia	A'	24th	Champions (1997, 1998, 2006, 2013, 2019, 2022, 2023)	88
Zimbabwe	U23	22nd	Champions (2000, 2003, 2005, 2009, 2017, 2018)	116

Key
A: First team
A': Local team
U23 Under-23 team (Olympic team)

=== Squads ===
Each team may name a preliminary squad of up to 30 players, which must be reduced to a final list of 23 for the tournament.

== Venues ==
The following two stadiums in the province of Free State were selected to host matches during the tournament, with one of them having previously served as a venue for the 2010 FIFA World Cup.

2025 COSAFA Cup is located in South Africa	Bloemfontein	
2025 COSAFA Cup is located in South Africa	Free State Stadium	Dr. Petrus Molemela Stadium
2025 COSAFA Cup is located in South Africa	Capacity: 42,000	Capacity: 22,000

== Final draw ==
The final tournament draw took place on 21 May 2025, 11:00 SAST (UTC+2). Four teams; the hosts, the defending champions, and the two highest-ranked sides according to the April 2025 FIFA Rankings, were automatically seeded in position 1 of Groups A to D. The remaining ten teams were divided into two pots based on their FIFA Rankings, with four teams placed in Pot 1 and six in Pot 2.

=== Seeding ===
Seeding Pot 1
Team	Rank
Mozambique	96
Comoros	105
Namibia	108
Madagascar	115

Seeding Pot 2
Team	Rank
Zimbabwe	116
Malawi	132
Botswana	136
Lesotho	148
Eswatini	155
Mauritius	178

=== Draw ===
Group A
Pos	Team
A1	South Africa
A2	Mozambique
A3	Mauritius
A4	Zimbabwe

Group B
Pos	Team
B1	Angola
B2	Namibia
B3	Malawi
B4	Lesotho

Group C
Pos	Team
C1	Morocco (Note: At the time of the draw, Morocco was still listed as a participant, the position was later taken by Tanzania)
C2	Madagascar
C3	Eswatini

Group D
Pos	Team
D1	Zambia
D2	Comoros
D3	Botswana

== Match officials ==
Referees

- (Botswana) Thabang Ketshabile
- (Madagascar) Arnaud Zafimahatoha
- (Malawi) Godfrey Nkhakananga
- (Mauritius) Patrice Milazar
- (Mozambique) Celso Alvação
- (Namibia) Mweshitsama Naftal
- (Zambia) Hillary Hambaba
- (Zimbabwe) Brighton Chimene

Assistant Referees

- (Botswana) Gaselame Molefe
- (Comoros) Hangula Angula
- (Comoros) Moustoifa Elmahfoudhe
- (Eswatini) Zamani Simelane
- (Madagascar) Romuald Ibenantenaina
- (Mauritius) Fabien Cauvelet
- (Malawi) Lameck Phiri
- (Mozambique) Zacarias Balói
- (South Africa) Elphas Sitole
- (Zambia) Trywell Nyirenda

Video assistant referees

- (Eswatini) Letticia Viana
- (Kenya) Mary Njoroge
- (Mauritius) Maria Rivet
- (Seychelles) Shaji Padayachy
- (South Africa) Akhona Makalima
- (Zambia) Trywell Nyirenda
- (Zimbabwe) Claris Simango

== Group stage ==
=== Tiebreakers ===
Teams were ranked according to points (3 points for a win, 1 point for a draw, 0 points for a loss).

If two teams were tied on points, the following tiebreaking criteria were applied, in the order given, to determine the rankings:

1. Points in head-to-head matches match between the two tied teams;
2. Goal difference in all group matches;
3. Goals scored in all group matches;
4. Drawing of lots.

If more than two teams were tied, the following criteria were applied instead:

1. Points in matches between the tied teams;
2. Goal difference in matches between the tied teams;
3. Goals scored in matches between the tied teams;
4. If after applying all criteria above, two teams were still tied, the above criteria were again applied to matches played between the two teams in question. If this did not resolve the tie, the next three criteria were applied;
5. Goal difference in all group matches;
6. Goals scored in all group matches;
7. Drawing of lots.

=== Group A ===
Pos	Team	Pld	W	D	L	GF	GA	GD	Pts	Qualification
1	South Africa (H)	3	1	1	1	2	1	+1	4	Advance to knockout stage
2	Zimbabwe	3	1	1	1	3	3	0	4	
3	Mozambique	3	1	1	1	2	3	−1	4	
4	Mauritius	3	0	3	0	0	0	0	3	

Source: COSAFA
Rules for classification: Group stage tiebreakers
(H) Hosts
4 June 2025
15:00

South Africa	0–1	Mozambique
	Report	Sumbane 73'

Free State Stadium, Bloemfontein
Referee: Arnaud Zafimahatoha (Madagascar)
4 June 2025
18:00

Mauritius	0–0	Zimbabwe
	Report

Free State Stadium, Bloemfontein
Referee: Godfrey Nkhakananga (Malawi)

7 June 2025
12:00

Mozambique	0–0	Mauritius
	Report

Dr. Petrus Molemela Stadium, Bloemfontein
Referee: Mweshitsama Naftal (Namibia)
7 June 2025
15:00

South Africa	2–0	Zimbabwe
Dlamini 40' (pen.); Okon 78'	Report

Dr. Petrus Molemela Stadium, Bloemfontein
Referee: Thabang Ketshabile (Botswana)

10 June 2025
18:00

Mozambique	1–3	Zimbabwe
Calção 38'	Report	Ngwenya 27', 36' (pen.); Makunike 90+5'

Dr. Petrus Molemela Stadium, Bloemfontein
Referee: Godfrey Nkhakananga (Malawi)
10 June 2025
18:00

South Africa	0–0	Mauritius
	Report

Free State Stadium, Bloemfontein
Referee: Celso Alvação (Mozambique)

=== Group B ===
Pos	Team	Pld	W	D	L	GF	GA	GD	Pts	Qualification
1	Angola	3	2	1	0	6	1	+5	7	Advance to knockout stage
2	Namibia	3	1	2	0	4	1	+3	5	
3	Lesotho	3	1	0	2	1	7	−6	3	
4	Malawi	3	0	1	2	0	2	−2	1	

Source: COSAFA
Rules for classification: Group stage tiebreakers
5 June 2025
15:00

Malawi	0–1	Lesotho
	Report	Ntaitsane 87'

Free State Stadium, Bloemfontein
Referee: Patrice Milazar (Mauritius)
5 June 2025
18:00

Angola	1–1	Namibia
Depú 90' (pen.)	Report	Kamberipa 90+7'

Free State Stadium, Bloemfontein
Referee: Hillary Hambaba (Zambia)

8 June 2025
12:00

Angola	4–0	Lesotho
Vidinho 42'; Depú 44', 52', 90+4'	Report

Dr. Petrus Molemela Stadium, Bloemfontein
Referee: Akhona Makalima (South Africa)
8 June 2025
15:00

Namibia	0–0	Malawi
	Report

Dr. Petrus Molemela Stadium, Bloemfontein
Referee: Hillary Hambaba (Zambia)

10 June 2025
15:00

Namibia	3–0	Lesotho
Haraseb 7'; Muzeu 74'; Kamatuka 82' (pen.)	Report

Dr. Petrus Molemela Stadium, Bloemfontein
Referee: Thabang Ketshabile (Botswana)
10 June 2025
15:00

Malawi	0–1	Angola
	Report	Randy Nteka 48'

Free State Stadium, Bloemfontein
Referee: Hillary Hambaba (Zambia)

=== Group C ===
Pos	Team	Pld	W	D	L	GF	GA	GD	Pts	Qualification
1	Madagascar	2	1	1	0	2	1	+1	4	Advance to knockout stage
2	Tanzania	2	1	0	1	2	2	0	3	
3	Eswatini	2	0	1	1	2	3	−1	1	

Source: COSAFA
Rules for classification: Group stage tiebreakers
7 June 2025
18:00

Tanzania	0–1	Madagascar
	Report	Rakotondraibe 29'

Free State Stadium, Bloemfontein
Referee: Celso Alvação (Mozambique)

9 June 2025
15:00

Madagascar	1–1	Eswatini
Rafanomezantsoa 41'	Report	Magagula 62'

Dr. Petrus Molemela Stadium, Bloemfontein
Referee: Godfrey Nkhakananga (Malawi)

11 June 2025
15:00

Eswatini	1–2	Tanzania
Magagula 29'	Report	Nado 37'; Khamis 69'

Free State Stadium, Bloemfontein
Referee: Arnaud Zafimahatoha (Madagascar)

=== Group D ===
Pos	Team	Pld	W	D	L	GF	GA	GD	Pts	Qualification
1	Comoros	2	1	1	0	1	0	+1	4	Advance to knockout stage
2	Botswana	2	0	2	0	3	3	0	2	
3	Zambia	2	0	1	1	3	4	−1	1	

Source: COSAFA
Rules for classification: Group stage tiebreakers
6 June 2025
18:00

Zambia	0–1	Comoros
	Report	Madi 31'

Free State Stadium, Bloemfontein
Referee: Brighton Chimene (Zimbabwe)

9 June 2025
18:00

Comoros	0–0	Botswana
	Report

Dr. Petrus Molemela Stadium, Bloemfontein
Referee: Arnaud Zafimahatoha (Madagascar)

11 June 2025
15:00

Botswana	3–3	Zambia
Kgamanyane 2'; Semadi 32' (pen.); Maponda 60'	Report	Zulu 45+4' (pen.); Sakala 52'; Jo. Phiri 90' (pen.)

Dr. Petrus Molemela Stadium, Bloemfontein
Referee: Akhona Makalima (South Africa)

== Knockout stage ==
=== Bracket ===
Semi-Finals
13 June–Bloemfontein
Angola	4
Madagascar	1
13 June–Bloemfontein
South Africa	3
Comoros	1

Final
15 June–Bloemfontein
Angola	3
South Africa	0
Third-Place
15 June–Bloemfontein
Madagascar	0
Comoros	1

=== Semi-finals ===
13 June 2025
15:00

Angola	4–1	Madagascar
Depú 19' (pen.), 39'; Zini 74'; Além 86'	Report	Razafimahatana 90+2'

Free State Stadium, Bloemfontein
Referee: Celso Alvação (Mozambique)

13 June 2025
18:00

South Africa	3–1	Comoros
I. Mohamed 8' (o.g.); Radiopane 14'; Sebelebele 60'	Report	Madi 29'

Free State Stadium, Bloemfontein
Referee: Hillary Hambaba (Zambia)

=== Third-place ===
15 June 2025
12:00

Madagascar	0–1	Comoros
	Report	Ibroihim 77'

Free State Stadium, Bloemfontein
Referee: Akhona Makalima (South Africa)

=== Final ===
15 June 2025
15:00

Angola	3–0	South Africa
Depú 43', 62'; Milson 81'	Report

Free State Stadium, Bloemfontein
Referee: Brighton Chimene (Zimbabwe)

== Statistics ==
=== Goalscorers ===
There were 44 goals scored in 22 matches, for an average of 2 goals per match.

8 goals

- (Angola) Depú

2 goals

- (Comoros) Ibrahim Madi
- (Eswatini) Junior Magagula
- (Zimbabwe) Thandolwenkosi Ngwenya

1 goal

- (Angola) Além
- (Angola) Felicio Milson
- (Angola) Randy Nteka
- (Angola) Vidinho
- (Angola) Zini
- (Botswana) Thatayaone Kgamanyane
- (Botswana) Thabo Maponda
- (Botswana) Serati Semadi
- (Comoros) Youssouf Ibroihim
- (Lesotho) Makara Ntaitsane
- (Madagascar) Lalaina Rafanomezantsoa
- (Madagascar) Toky Rakotondraibe
- (Madagascar) Mika Razafimahatana
- (Mozambique) Leonel Calção
- (Mozambique) António Sumbane
- (Namibia) Sisqo Haraseb
- (Namibia) Joslin Kamatuka
- (Namibia) Ivan Kamberipa
- (Namibia) Bethuel Muzeu
- (South Africa) Kabelo Dlamini
- (South Africa) Ime Okon
- (South Africa) Boitumelo Radiopane
- (South Africa) Kamogelo Sebelebele
- (Tanzania) Iddy Nado
- (Tanzania) Sheikhan Khamis
- (Zambia) Joseph Phiri
- (Zambia) Tinklar Sakala
- (Zambia) Charles Zulu
- (Zimbabwe) Junior Makunike

1 own goal

- (Comoros) Idris Mohamed (against South Africa)

=== Discipline ===
A player was automatically suspended for the next match for the following offences:

- Receiving a red card (red card suspensions could be extended for serious offences)
- Receiving two yellow cards in two different matches; yellow cards expired after the completion of the group stage unless the second yellow was received in the final group match (yellow card suspensions were not carried forward to any other future international matches)

Players suspended during the tournament—sortable
Player	Offence(s)	Suspension(s)
(Angola) Randy Nteka	(red card) in Group B vs Namibia (matchday 1, 5 June 2025)	Group B vs Lesotho (matchday 2; 8 June 2025)
(Mauritius) Pascal Colin	(yellow card) (yellow-red card) in Group A vs Mozambique (matchday 2, 7 June 2025)	Group A vs South Africa (matchday 3; 10 June 2025)
(Lesotho) Lehlohonolo Matsau	(yellow card) in Group B vs Malawi (matchday 1, 5 June 2025); (yellow card) in Group B vs Angola (matchday 2, 8 June 2025)	Group B vs Namibia (matchday 3; 10 June 2025)
(Comoros) Naimoudine Assane	(yellow card) (yellow-red card) in Semi-finals vs South Africa (13 June 2025)	Third-place match vs Madagascar (15 June 2025)
