= Idris Mohamed =

Footballer (born 2003)

Personal information
- Date of birth: 25 November 2003 (age 22)
- Place of birth: Aix-en-Provence, France
- Height: 1.94 m (6 ft 4 in)
- Position: Centre-back

Team information
- Current team: Metz
- Number: 98

Youth career
- Istres
- 2021–2022: Marignane GCB

Senior career*
Years	Team	Apps	(Gls)
2022–2023	Marignane GCB II	7	(1)
2023–2025	Rousset	44	(4)
2025–2026	Le Puy	30	(0)
2026–	Metz	0	(0)

International career^{‡}
2025–	Comoros	5	(0)
- * Club domestic league appearances and goals as of 23 June 2026 ‡ National team caps and goals as of 22:00, 17 June 2026 (UTC)

Idris Mohamed (born 25 November 2003) is a professional footballer who plays as a centre-back for the Ligue 2 club Metz. Born in France, he plays for the Comoros national team.

== Club career ==
Mohamed is a product of the youth academies of the French clubs Istres and Marignane GCB. In 2022, he debuted with Marignane GCB in the Championnat National 3, and the following year he moved to Rousset in the same competition. On 27 May 2025, he transferred to Le Puy in the Championnat National.

== International career ==
Born in France, Mohamed is of Comorian descent and holds dual French-Comorian citizenship. He was called up to the Comoros national team for the 2025 COSAFA Cup.

On 11 December 2025, Mohamed was called up to the Comoros squad for the 2025 Africa Cup of Nations.
