= 2024 COSAFA Cup =

23rd edition of the COSAFA Cup

Tournament details
- Host country: South Africa
- City: Gqeberha
- Dates: 26 June – 7 July
- Teams: 12 (from 1 confederation)
- Venue: 2 (in 1 host city)

Final positions
- Champions: Angola (4th title)
- Runners-up: Namibia
- Third place: Mozambique
- Fourth place: Comoros

Tournament statistics
- Matches played: 22
- Goals scored: 47 (2.14 per match)
- Top scorer(s): (Angola) Depú (5 goals)
- Best player: (Angola) Maestro
- Best goalkeeper: (Mozambique) Armando Doutor

The 2024 COSAFA Cup was the 23rd edition of the annual association football competition organized by COSAFA. It was held in South Africa for the seventh straight year, this time in Gqeberha (Port Elizabeth), from 26 June to 7 July 2024. Zambia were the defending champions, but were eliminated in the group stage.

== Participating nations ==
Twelve nations featured in the 2024 edition of the tournament. Two COSAFA members, Madagascar and Mauritius, did not participate. Zimbabwe returned to the tournament for the first time since the 2021 edition following its FIFA ban. Despite originally being announced as a participant, Malawi withdrew from the tournament prior to the group draw out of respect for eight victims of a plane crash earlier that week. One of the victims was former Vice-President of Malawi Saulos Chilima. Kenya accepted COSAFA’s invitation to participate as a guest to replace Malawi.

National team	FIFA Ranking (4 April 2024)	Previous best performance
Eswatini	148	Semi-finals (1999, 2002, 2003, 2021)
Comoros	117	Quarter-finals (2019)
Lesotho	149	Runners-up (2000, 2023)
Botswana	146	Runners-up (2016, 2019)
Zambia	86	Champions (1997, 1998, 2006, 2013, 2019, 2022, 2023)
Mozambique	110	Runners-up (2008, 2015)
Namibia	106	Champions (2015)
South Africa	59	Champions (2002, 2007, 2008, 2016, 2021)
Angola	94	Champions (1999, 2001, 2004)
Seychelles	197	Group stage (2005, 2006, 2007, 2008, 2009, 2013, 2015, 2016, 2017, 2018, 2019, 2022, 2023)
Zimbabwe	122	Champions (2000, 2003, 2005, 2009, 2017, 2018)
Kenya (Guest)	107	Group stage (2013)

== Format ==
The twelve participating teams were drawn into three groups of four teams. As the defending champions, Zambia and the next two highest ranked teams, Angola and South Africa, were in separate groups as the seeded teams. Group winners and the best runner-up will moved on to the semi-finals.

== Dates ==
Originally scheduled to be held 14 to 23 June 2024, the competition was then postponed. At the time the date change was announced, nations had already begun naming their squads and leagues had altered their season schedules to accommodate the tournament. COSAFA stated that the postponement was necessarily to give the competition maximum exposure, presumably because of a number of high-profile competitions that would have been taking place at the same time. On 13 June 2024, COSAFA announced the tournament would be played from 26 June to 7 July 2024.

== Draw ==
The draw for the group stage of the 2024 COSAFA Cup was held on 14 June 2024 in Johannesburg.

== Venues ==
Gqeberha	Gqeberha is located in South Africa	Gqeberha
Nelson Mandela Bay Stadium	Gqeberha is located in South Africa	Wolfson Stadium
Capacity: 42,486	Gqeberha is located in South Africa	Capacity: 10,000

== Group stage ==
Tiebreakers

Teams are ranked according to points (3 points for a win, 1 point for a draw, 0 points for a loss), and if tied on points, the following tiebreaking criteria are applied, in the order given, to determine the rankings:

1. Points in head-to-head matches among tied teams;
2. Goal difference in head-to-head matches among tied teams;
3. Goals scored in head-to-head matches among tied teams;
4. If more than two teams are tied, and after applying all head-to-head criteria above, a subset of teams are still tied, all head-to-head criteria above are reapplied exclusively to this subset of teams;
5. Goal difference in all group matches;
6. Goals scored in all group matches;
7. Penalty shoot-out if only two teams are tied and they met in the last round of the group;
8. Disciplinary points (yellow card = 1 point, red card as a result of two yellow cards = 3 points, direct red card = 3 points, yellow card followed by direct red card = 4 points);
9. Drawing of lots.

Group stage matches were played from 26 June to 3 July 2024.

=== Group A ===
Pos	Team	Pld	W	D	L	GF	GA	GD	Pts	Qualification
1	Mozambique	3	1	2	0	4	2	+2	5	Advance to knockout stage
2	South Africa	3	1	2	0	2	1	+1	5	
3	Eswatini	3	0	2	1	0	1	−1	2	
4	Botswana	3	0	2	1	1	3	−2	2	

Source: COSAFA
Rules for classification: Group stage tiebreakers
26 June
15:00

Eswatini	0–0	Botswana
	Report

Nelson Mandela Bay Stadium, Gqeberha
26 June
18:00

South Africa	1–1	Mozambique
Dortley 39'	Report	Chamito 65'

Nelson Mandela Bay Stadium, Gqeberha

29 June
12:00

Mozambique	0–0	Eswatini
	Report

Isaac Wolfson Stadium, Gqeberha
29 June
15:00

South Africa	0–0	Botswana
	Report

Isaac Wolfson Stadium, Gqeberha

2 July
15:00

Mozambique	3–1	Botswana
Ferreira 45+2'; Dário 66'; Cândido 90+4'	Report	Kopelang 20'

Isaac Wolfson Stadium, Gqeberha
2 July
15:00

South Africa	1–0	Eswatini
Sibanyoni 3'	Report

Nelson Mandela Bay Stadium, Gqeberha

=== Group B ===
Pos	Team	Pld	W	D	L	GF	GA	GD	Pts	Qualification
1	Comoros	3	2	0	1	3	1	+2	6	Advance to knockout stage
2	Kenya	3	2	0	1	4	2	+2	6	
3	Zimbabwe	3	2	0	1	3	2	+1	6	
4	Zambia	3	0	0	3	0	5	−5	0	

Source: COSAFA
Rules for classification: Group stage tiebreakers
27 June
15:00

Zimbabwe	1–0	Comoros
Tapera 53'	Report

Nelson Mandela Bay Stadium, Gqeberha
27 June
18:00

Zambia	0–2	Kenya
	Report	A. Odhiambo 8' (pen.); Otieno 19'

Nelson Mandela Bay Stadium, Gqeberha

30 June
12:00

Kenya	0–2	Comoros
	Report	Djambae 34' (pen.), 49'

Isaac Wolfson Stadium, Gqeberha
30 June
15:00

Zambia	0–2	Zimbabwe
	Report	Tapera 8'; Benhura 43'

Isaac Wolfson Stadium, Gqeberha

2 July
12:00

Kenya	2–0	Zimbabwe
A. Odhiambo 54'; Omalla 73'	Report

Isaac Wolfson Stadium, Gqeberha
2 July
12:00

Comoros	1–0	Zambia
Ibroihim 61'	Report

Nelson Mandela Bay Stadium, Gqeberha

=== Group C ===
Pos	Team	Pld	W	D	L	GF	GA	GD	Pts	Qualification
1	Angola	3	2	1	0	6	3	+3	7	Advance to knockout stage
2	Namibia	3	2	1	0	5	2	+3	7	Advance to knockout stage
3	Seychelles	3	0	1	2	4	7	−3	1	
4	Lesotho	3	0	1	2	3	6	−3	1	

Source: COSAFA
Rules for classification: Group stage tiebreakers
28 June
15:00

Lesotho	1–1	Seychelles
Thabantso 19'	Report	Hoareau 69'

Nelson Mandela Bay Stadium, Gqeberha
28 June
18:00

Angola	0–0	Namibia
	Report

Nelson Mandela Bay Stadium, Gqeberha

1 July
12:00

Angola	3–2	Seychelles
Depú 9', 58'; Maestro 79'	Report	Gamatice 26'; Labrosse 46'

Isaac Wolfson Stadium, Gqeberha
1 July
15:00

Namibia	2–1	Lesotho
Kamberipa 38'; Muzeu 69'	Report	Mokhachane 54'

Isaac Wolfson Stadium, Gqeberha

3 July
15:00

Namibia	3–1	Seychelles
Muzeu 11' (pen.), 81'; Kulula 48'	Report	Labrosse 87'

Isaac Wolfson Stadium, Gqeberha
3 July
15:00

Lesotho	1–3	Angola
Fothoane 26'	Report	Depú 42' (pen.); Vidinho 63'; Miro 90+5' (pen.)

Nelson Mandela Bay Stadium, Gqeberha

=== Best Runner-up Table ===
Pos	Grp	Team	Pld	W	D	L	GF	GA	GD	Pts	Qualification
1	C	Namibia	3	2	1	0	5	2	+3	7	Advance to knockout stage
2	B	Kenya	3	2	0	1	4	2	+2	6	
3	A	South Africa	3	1	2	0	2	1	+1	5	

Source: COSAFA
Rules for classification: Group stage tiebreakers

== Knockout stage ==
Semi-final matches were played on 5 July 2024 with the third-place and final match played two days later.

=== Bracket ===
Semi-Finals
5 July –Gqeberha
Comoros	1
Angola	2
5 July –Gqeberha
Mozambique	0 (2)
Namibia (p)	0 (4)

Final
7 July – Gqeberha
Angola	5
Namibia	0
Third-Place
7 July - Gqeberha
Comoros	2 (1)
Mozambique (p)	2 (3)

=== Semi-finals ===
5 July 2024
15:00

Comoros	1–2	Angola
Ibroihim 83' (pen.)	Report	Keliano 3'; Depú 24'

Nelson Mandela Bay Stadium, Gqeberha
5 July 2024
18:00

Mozambique	0–0	Namibia
	Report
Penalties
Domingos (penalty scored); Carrelo (penalty missed); Dário (penalty missed); Maestro (penalty scored)	2–4	(penalty scored) Muzeu; (penalty scored) Hambira; (penalty scored) Kasume; (penalty scored) Petrus

Nelson Mandela Bay Stadium, Gqeberha

=== Third-place ===
7 July 2024
14:00

Comoros	2–2	Mozambique
Hadji 32'; Djoudja 70'	Report	Chamito 51', 78'
Penalties
Djoudja (penalty scored); Ahmed (penalty missed); Mohamed (penalty missed); Ben Ali Soufiane (penalty missed)	1–3	(penalty scored) Ferreira; (penalty scored) Jochua; (penalty missed) Cândido; (penalty scored) Chamito

Nelson Mandela Bay Stadium, Gqeberha

=== Final ===
7 July 2024
17:00

Angola	5–0	Namibia
Bondo 12'; Depú 44' (pen.); Vidinho 58', 68'; Keliano 70'	Report

Nelson Mandela Bay Stadium, Gqeberha
Referee: Imtehaz Heeralall (Mauritius)

== Statistics ==
=== Goalscorers ===
There were 47 goals scored in 22 matches, for an average of 2.14 goals per match.

5 goals

- (Angola) Depú

3 goals

- (Angola) Vidinho
- (Comoros) Ibroihim Djoudja
- (Mozambique) Chamito
- (Namibia) Bethuel Muzeu

2 goals

- (Angola) Manuel Keliano
- (Comoros) Affane Djambae
- (Kenya) Austine Odhiambo
- (Seychelles) Brandon Labrosse
- (Zimbabwe) Michael Tapera

1 goal

- (Angola) Pedro Bondo
- (Angola) Maestro
- (Angola) Miro
- (Botswana) Tebogo Kopelang
- (Comoros) Kassim Hadji
- (Kenya) Benson Omala
- (Kenya) Patrick Otieno
- (Lesotho) Lehlohonolo Fothoane
- (Lesotho) Neo Mokhachane
- (Lesotho) Jane Thabantso
- (Mozambique) Cândido
- (Mozambique) Dário
- (Mozambique) Momed Ferreira
- (Namibia) Erasmus Kulula
- (Namibia) Ivan Kamberipa
- (Seychelles) Johan Gamatice
- (Seychelles) Lorenzo Hoareau
- (South Africa) Rushwin Dortley
- (South Africa) Thabang Sibanyoni
- (Zimbabwe) Takunda Benhura
