= Dr. Petrus Molemela Stadium =

Sports stadium in South Africa

- Interactive map of Dr. Petrus Molemela Stadium
- Former names: Seisa Ramabodu stadium
- Location: Moshoeshoe Road, Bloemfontein, South Africa
- Coordinates: 29°10′27″S 26°14′1″E
- Owner: Mangaung Metropolitan Municipality
- Operator: Mangaung Metropolitan Municipality
- Capacity: 22,000
- Surface: Grass

Construction
- Opened: 1982
- Renovated: 2008, 2014
- Cost: R60 million (2008 refurbishment)

Tenant
- Siwelele

Dr. Petrus Molemela Stadium, formerly known as Seisa Ramabodu Stadium, is a multi-purpose stadium located in Bloemfontein, South Africa. It is used mostly for soccer matches and was utilized as a training field for teams participating in the 2010 FIFA World Cup after being renovated in 2008 and brought up to FIFA standards.

It was the home stadium of Bloemfontein Celtic who also used the Free State Stadium. During three-year renovations completed in 2015, the stadium's capacity was expanded from 18,000 to 22,000.

From the 2025–26 season it hosted newly-formed Siwelele.
