= Comoros national football team =

Men's association football team

Comoros
- Nickname: Les Coelacantes (The Coelacanths)
- Association: Fédération de Football de Comores (FFC)
- Confederation: CAF (Africa)
- Sub-confederation: COSAFA (Southern Africa)
- Head coach: Hubert Velud
- Captain: Youssouf M'Changama
- Most caps: Youssouf M'Changama (78)
- Top scorer: Ben Nabouhane (20)
- Home stadium: Stade Omnisports de Malouzini
- FIFA code: COM
First colours	Second colours	Third colours

FIFA ranking
- Current: 105 ▲2 (18 November 2026)
- Highest: 103 (November 2024)
- Lowest: 207 (December 2006)

First international
- Mauritius 3–0 Comoros (Saint-Denis, Réunion; 26 August 1979)

Biggest win
- Comoros 7–1 Seychelles (Mitsamiouli, Comoros; 1 September 2021)

Biggest defeat
- Réunion 6–1 Comoros (Saint-Denis, Réunion; 31 August 1979); Madagascar 4–1 Comoros (Victoria, Seychelles; 20 August 1993); Mauritius 4–1 Comoros (Curepipe, Mauritius; 4 September 2003)

Africa Cup of Nations
- Appearances: 2 (first in 2021)
- Best result: Round of 16 (2021)

FIFA Arab Cup
- Appearances: 1 (first in 2025)
- Best result: Group stage (2025)

COSAFA Cup
- Appearances: 8 (first in 2008)
- Best result: Third place (2025)
Medal record
COSAFA Cup
Bronze medal – third place	2025 South Africa	Team
Indian Ocean Island Games
Bronze medal – third place	1979 Reunion
Bronze medal – third place	1985 Mauritius

The Comoros national football team represents the Comoros in international football and is controlled by the Comoros Football Federation. It was formed in 1979, joined the Confederation of African Football (CAF) in 2003, and became a FIFA member in 2005. Comoros qualified for their first major tournament in 2021, after their 0–0 draw with Togo assured them of a place in the 2021 Africa Cup of Nations.

== History ==
The national football team of the Comoros played their first matches in the 1979 Indian Ocean Island Games. Those were the only games they played until qualification for the 2009 Arab Nations Cup in 2006. Those two matches were their first two matches with full FIFA recognition, and included a 4–2 victory over Djibouti. In 2007, Comoros first entered qualification for the World Cup and the Africa Cup of Nations for the 2010 tournaments, but lost in the preliminary round 2–10 on aggregate to Madagascar.

During the 2018 FIFA World Cup qualifiers in October 2015, Les Coelacantes advanced past the first round for the first time ever by beating Lesotho on away goals after two draws. Since then results have improved steadily, including home wins against Botswana, Mauritius and Malawi in Africa Cup of Nations qualifiers.

On 14 November 2019, Comoros opened their 2021 Africa Cup of Nations qualification campaign with a 0–1 win away to Togo, their first away win in a major qualifier. They would go on to qualify for the final tournament, their first major tournament since joining FIFA.

In the 2021 Africa Cup of Nations, Ahmed Mogni scored a brace for Comoros in their 3–2 group match victory over Ghana in what the BBC described as "one of the biggest shocks in Nations Cup history".

In the 2026 FIFA World Cup qualifiers, Comoros started off strong within Group I after they won 4–2 against Central African Republic and 1–0 against Ghana, with both games being played at home. Comoros then won 2-0 against Chad, but they also lost 2-1 to Madagascar. They would be eliminated after losing to Madagascar 2-1 again.

During the 2024 COSAFA Cup, Comoros reached the semi-finals for the first time in their history and lost 2-1 against Angola; Comoros then claimed fourth place after losing on penalties against Mozambique. Comoros went one better in the 2025 COSAFA Cup and finished third after defeating Madagascar 1–0.

== Results and fixtures ==
The following is a list of match results in the last 12 months, as well as any future matches that have been scheduled.

Win Draw Loss Fixture

=== 2025 ===
14 November Friendly	Comoros	1–0	Namibia	Moroni, Comoros
	Vita 85'			Stadium: Stade omnisports de Malouzini

17 November Friendly	Comoros	4–0	Namibia	Moroni, Comoros
19:00 UTC+3	M'Changama 4'; Youssouf 22'; Ahmed 69'; Ben Nabouhane 77'	Report		Stadium: Stade omnisports de Malouzini

26 November 2025 FIFA Arab Cup qualifiers	Comoros	4–4 (4–2 p)	Yemen	Doha, Qatar
19:00 UTC+3	Zakouani 30' (pen.); Anbar 61' (o.g.); Amir 90+1' (pen.), 90+3'		Al-Zubaidi 14'; Mohammedoh 40'; Al-Matari 45+2', 65'	Stadium: Grand Hamad Stadium; Attendance: 1,342; Referee: Cristián Garay (Chile)
	Penalties
	Kari (penalty scored); Zakouani (penalty scored); Djae (penalty scored); Amir (penalty scored)		(penalty scored) Al-Zubaidi; (penalty scored) Al-Golan; (penalty missed) Al-Wasmani; (penalty missed) Mohammedoh

2 December 2025 FIFA Arab Cup Group B	Morocco	3–1	Comoros	Al Rayyan, Qatar
15:00 UTC+3	Bouftini 5'; Tissoudali 11'; El Berkaoui 45+4'	Report	Boulacsoute 56' (o.g.)	Stadium: Khalifa International Stadium; Attendance: 10,246; Referee: Ma Ning (China)

5 December 2025 FIFA Arab Cup Group B	Comoros	1–3	Saudi Arabia	Al Khor, Qatar
21:30 UTC+3	Djoudja 63'	Report	Kanno 45+4', 51'; Al-Dawsari 76'	Stadium: Al Bayt Stadium; Attendance: 32,219; Referee: Juan Calderón (Costa Rica)

8 December 2025 FIFA Arab Cup Group B	Oman	2–1	Comoros	Doha, Qatar
20:00 UTC+3	Al Sabhi 30', 43'	Report	Hamidou 68'	Stadium: Stadium 974; Attendance: 9,348; Referee: Pierre Atcho (Gabon)

21 December 2025 AFCON Group A	Morocco	2–0	Comoros	Rabat, Morocco
20:00 UTC+1	Brahim 55'; El Kaabi 74'	Report		Stadium: Prince Moulay Abdellah Stadium; Attendance: 60,180; Referee: Jean-Jacques Ndala Ngambo (DR Congo)

26 December 2025 AFCON Group A	Zambia	0–0	Comoros	Casablanca, Morocco
18:30 UTC+1		Report		Stadium: Mohammed V Stadium; Referee: Ahmad Heeralall (Mauritius)

29 December 2025 AFCON Group A	Comoros	0–0	Mali	Casablanca, Morocco
20:00 UTC+1		Report	Haidara (red card) 88'	Stadium: Mohammed V Stadium; Referee: Alhadji Allaou Mahamat (Chad)

=== 2026 ===
28 March 2026 FIFA Series	Namibia	0–0 (5–4 p)	Comoros	Astana, Kazakhstan
17:00 UTC+5		Report		Stadium: Astana Arena; Referee: Arman Ismuratov (Kazakhstan)
	Penalties
	Hanamub (penalty scored); Muzeu (penalty scored); Petrus (penalty scored); Rudath (penalty scored); Kambato (penalty scored)		(penalty scored) Kari; (penalty scored) Id. Mohamed; (penalty missed) Ali; (penalty scored) Abdallah; (penalty scored) Mroivili

31 March 2026 FIFA Series	Kazakhstan	1–0	Comoros	Astana, Kazakhstan
--:-- UTC+5	Orazov 4'	Report		Stadium: Astana Arena; Referee: Ishmael Barbara (Malta)

6 June Hybrid match	Morocco U23	2–1	Comoros	Marrakesh, Morocco
	Zabiri	Report
Note: Initially, Comoros planned to play against Rwanda. However, Rwanda withdrew due to health restrictions.

8 June Friendly	Equatorial Guinea	0–1	Comoros	Marrakesh, Morocco
10:30 UTC+1			Youssouf 90+1'

24 September 2027 AFCON qualification	Cameroon	3–1	Comoros	Garoua, Cameroon
21:00 UTC+0	Nyengue 39'; Mbeumo 48'; Namaso 81'	Report	Omari 51'	Stadium: Roumdé Adjia Stadium; Attendance: 30,000; Referee: Abdulsalam Abiola Kasim (Nigeria)

29 September 2027 AFCON qualification	Comoros	1–0	Namibia	Iconi, Comoros
13:00 UTC+0	B. Youssouf 53'	Report		Stadium: Stade Omnisports de Malouzini; Referee: Samuel Uwikunda (Rwanda)

4 October Friendly	Senegal	0–1	Comoros	Marseille, France
15:00 UTC+2	Ndiaye 5'	Report		Stadium: Stade Vélodrome; Referee: Lawrence Visser (Belgium)

13 November 2027 AFCON qualification	Comoros	0–0	Congo	Iconi, Comoros
14:00 UTC+0		Report		Stadium: Stade Omnisports de Malouzini; Referee: Issa Sy (Senegal)

17 November 2027 AFCON qualification	Congo	0–1	Comoros	Brazzaville, Congo
20:00 UTC+0		Report	Hamada 32'	Stadium: Stade Alphonse Massemba-Débat; Referee: Ali Brahamou Sadou (Niger)

=== 2027 ===
24 March 2027 AFCON qualification	Comoros	v	Cameroon	TBD, Comoros
TBD				Stadium: TBD

28 March 2027 AFCON qualification	Namibia	v	Comoros	TBD, Namibia
TBD				Stadium: TBD

== Coaching staff ==
Position	Name
Head coach	(France) Hubert Velud
Assistant coaches	(Comoros) Mostoifa Ahmed Ben Hassane (Comoros) Cheikh Mohamed Abubakar
Goalkeeping coach	(Comoros) Faisal Soilihi
Fitness coach	(Comoros) Youssouf Omar
Match analyst	(Comoros) Said Hamadi
Technical director	(Comoros) Ali Mbaé Camara

=== Coaching history ===
- (France) Pierre Jacky (1985)
- (Comoros) Ali Mbaé Camara (2006–2007)
- (France) Manuel Amoros (2010)
- (Comoros) Mohamed Chamité (2010–2011)
- (Comoros) Ali Mbaé Camara (2011–2013)
- (France) Amir Abdou (2014–2022)
- (France) Younes Zerdouk (2022–2023)
- (Italy) Stefano Cusin (2023–2026)
- (France) Hubert Velud (2026–)

== Players ==
=== Current squad ===
The following players were called up for the 2025 Africa Cup of Nations between 21 December 2025 and 18 January 2026.

Caps and goals correct as of 29 December 2025, after the match against Mali.

No.	Pos.	Player	Date of birth (age)	Caps	Goals	Club
1	GK	Salim Ben Boina	19 July 1991 (age 35)	25	0	(French Football Federation) Istres
16	GK	Yannick Pandor	1 May 2001 (age 25)	15	0	(Royal Belgian Football Association) Francs Borains
23	GK	Adel Anzimati	5 November 2001 (age 25)	6	0	(Football Federation of Armenia) Ararat Yerevan
2	DF	Ismaël Boura	14 August 2000 (age 26)	5	0	(French Football Federation) Troyes
3	DF	Abdel-Hakim Abdallah	18 August 1997 (age 29)	19	0	(French Football Federation) Guingamp
4	DF	Kenan Toibibou	9 December 2004 (age 21)	0	0	(Royal Spanish Football Federation) Cádiz
5	DF	Ahmed Soilihi	1 July 1996 (age 30)	14	0	(French Football Federation) Toulon
8	DF	Yannis Kari	2 November 2000 (age 26)	5	0	(Royal Belgian Football Association) Francs Borains
12	DF	Kassim M'Dahoma	26 January 1997 (age 29)	36	1	(French Football Federation) Aubagne
22	DF	Saïd Bakari	22 September 1994 (age 32)	43	1	(Royal Dutch Football Association) Sparta Rotterdam
25	DF	Idris Mohamed	25 November 2003 (age 22)	0	0	(French Football Federation) Le Puy
6	MF	Iyad Mohamed	5 March 2001 (age 25)	19	0	(Portuguese Football Federation) Casa Pia
10	MF	Youssouf M'Changama (captain)	29 August 1990 (age 36)	71	14	(Saudi Arabian Football Federation) Al-Batin
14	MF	Rémy Vita	1 April 2001 (age 25)	6	1	(Portuguese Football Federation) Tondela
15	MF	Benjaloud Youssouf	11 February 1994 (age 32)	47	4	(French Football Federation) Sochaux
18	MF	Yacine Bourhane	30 September 1998 (age 28)	29	1	(Polish Football Association) Motor Lublin
26	MF	Raouf Mroivili	14 January 1999 (age 27)	1	0	(French Football Federation) Villefranche
27	MF	Rayan Lutin	16 January 2003 (age 23)	8	0	(French Football Federation) Amiens
28	MF	Zaydou Youssouf	11 July 1999 (age 27)	11	0	(Saudi Arabian Football Federation) Al-Fateh
7	FW	Faïz Selemani (third captain)	14 November 1993 (age 33)	45	7	(Qatar Football Association) Qatar SC
9	FW	Aboubacar Ali	2 April 2006 (age 20)	2	0	(Royal Belgian Football Association) Francs Borains
11	FW	Rafiki Saïd	15 March 2000 (age 26)	13	7	(The Football Association) Wolverhampton Wanderers
13	FW	Aymeric Ahmed	8 November 2003 (age 23)	7	1	(French Football Federation) Châteauroux
17	FW	Myziane Maolida	14 February 1999 (age 27)	13	4	Free agent
20	FW	Zaïd Amir	11 May 2002 (age 24)	3	2	(French Football Federation) Istres
21	FW	El Fardou Ben Nabouhane (vice-captain)	10 June 1989 (age 37)	47	20	(Football Association of Serbia) Zemun

=== Recent call-ups ===
The following players have been called up for the team within the last 12 months and are still available for selection.

Pos.	Player	Date of birth (age)	Caps	Goals	Club	Latest call-up
GK	Ali Ahamada	19 August 1991 (age 35)	36	0	Free agent	2025 FIFA Arab Cup
GK	Ahmed Fadjidou	31 December 2000 (age 25)	0	0	(Comoros) Fombomi	2025 FIFA Arab Cup
DF	Karim Mohamed	2 April 2001 (age 25)	1	0	(France) Borgo	2025 FIFA Arab Cup
DF	Omar Abdoul Anziz	29 July 2002 (age 24)	1	0	(Comoros) Volcan	2025 FIFA Arab Cup
DF	Tamime Tarek	29 March 1998 (age 28)	1	0	(Comoros) Gombessa Sport	2025 FIFA Arab Cup
DF	Nassim Ahmed	9 October 2000 (age 26)	0	0	(France) Toulon	2025 FIFA Arab Cup
DF	Nassuir Hamidou	21 July 2000 (age 26)	0	0	(France) Aubagne	2025 FIFA Arab Cup
DF	Hamza Abdallah	13 June 2003 (age 23)	0	0	(Switzerland) Lausanne-Sport	v. Namibia, 17 November 2025
MF	Haslane Alfonsi	28 December 2001 (age 24)	6	0	(Zanzibar) Mlandege	2025 FIFA Arab Cup
MF	Anfane Ahamada	7 May 2002 (age 24)	3	0	(France) Villefranche	2025 FIFA Arab Cup
MF	Zainou-Dine Mohamed	16 June 2000 (age 26)	1	0	(France) Rousset	2025 FIFA Arab Cup
MF	Hamis M'sa	29 December 2001 (aged 23)	0	0	(Zanzibar) Mlandege	2025 FIFA Arab Cup
MF	Ismaël Mohamed	8 August 1997 (age 29)	0	0	(Comoros) Zilimadjou	2025 FIFA Arab Cup
MF	Yassine Saindou	15 February 2001 (aged 24)	0	0	(France) Jura Sud	2025 FIFA Arab Cup
MF	Raïmane Daou	20 November 2004 (age 22)	6	0	(France) Aubagne	v. Namibia, 17 November 2025
FW	Ibroihim Djoudja	6 May 1994 (age 32)	46	11	(Botswana) Gaborone United	2025 FIFA Arab Cup
FW	Affane Djambae	22 September 2000 (age 26)	7	4	(United Arab Emirates) Masfout	2025 FIFA Arab Cup
FW	Kassim Hadji	23 March 2000 (age 26)	4	0	(Bulgaria) Botev Vratsa	2025 FIFA Arab Cup
FW	Housseine Zakouani	8 November 2003 (age 23)	2	0	Free agent	2025 FIFA Arab Cup
FW	Abdelmajid Djae	3 June 2005 (age 21)	0	0	(France) Limonest	2025 FIFA Arab Cup
FW	Faiz Mattoir	12 July 2000 (age 26)	18	2	(Bulgaria) Septemvri Sofia	v. Namibia, 17 November 2025
Notes: ^{INJ} Withdrew because of injury.

== Player records ==
As of 29 December 2025
Players in bold are still active with the Comoros.

=== Most appearances ===
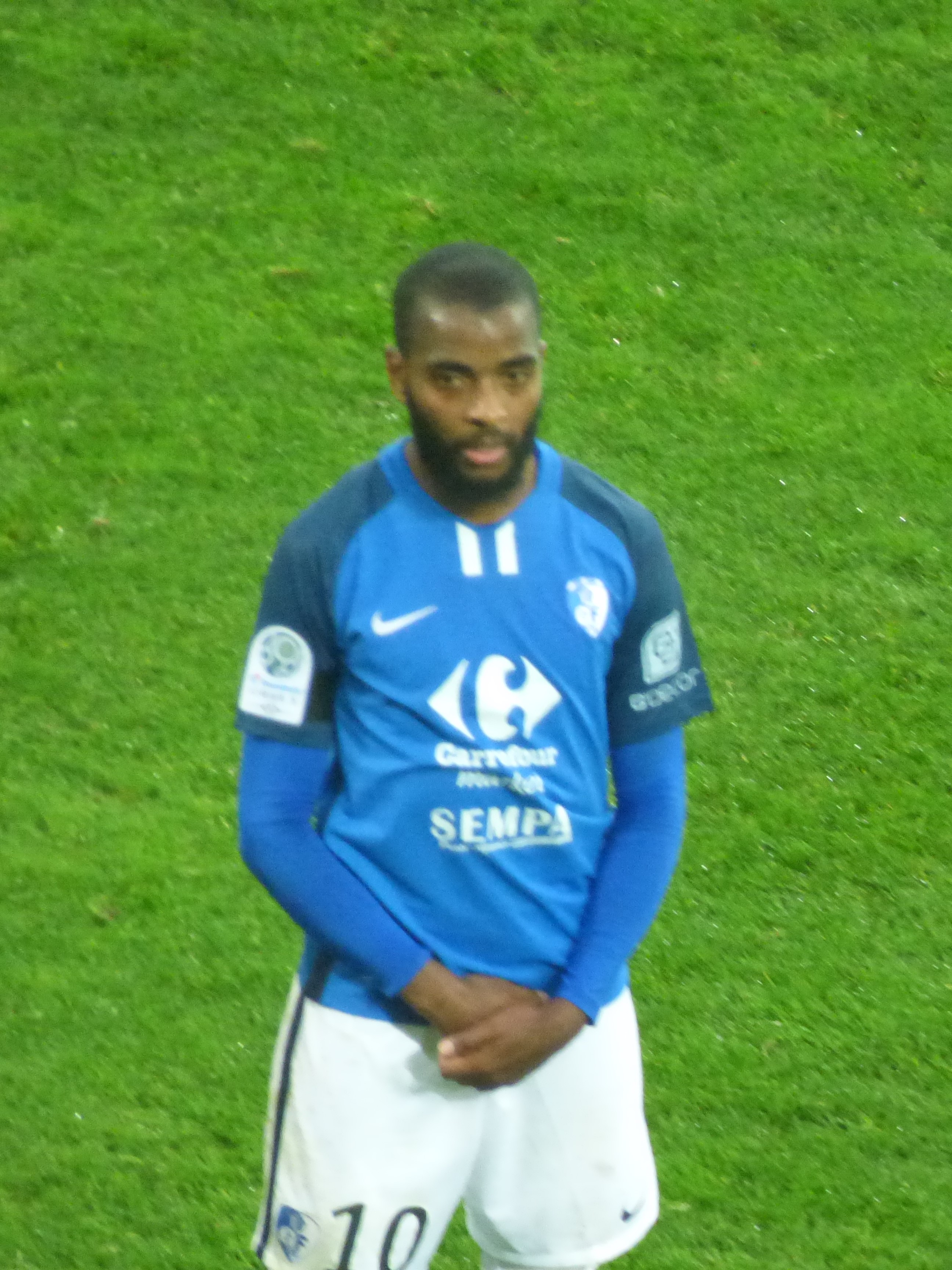
Youssouf M'Changama is Comoros' most capped player with 78 appearances.

Rank	Player	Caps	Goals	Career
1	**Youssouf M'Changama**	78	16	2010–present
2	**Ibroihim Youssouf**	57	13	2017–present
3	**Saïd Bakari**	56	1	2017–present
4	**Benjaloud Youssouf**	53	5	2015–present
5	**Faïz Selemani**	48	7	2017–present
6	Ben Nabouhane	47	20	2014–2025
7	**Mohamed Youssouf**	46	3	2011–present
8	**Kassim M'Dahoma**	42	1	2017–present
9	Fouad Bachirou	41	0	2014–2023
10	Nadjim Abdou	40	0	2010–2022

=== Top goalscorers ===
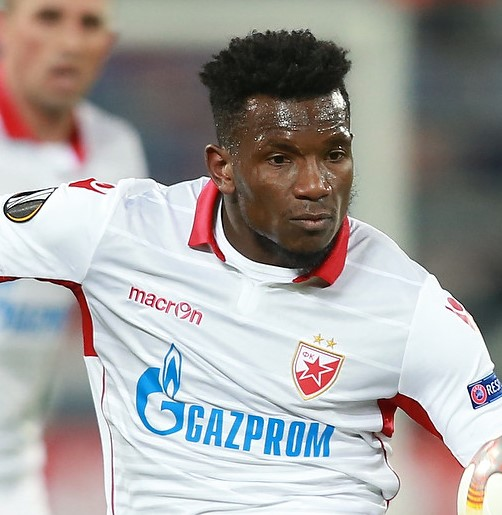
Ben Nabouhane is Comoros' top scorer with 20 goals.

Rank	Player	Goals	Caps	Ratio	Career
1	Ben Nabouhane	20	47	0.43	2014–2025
2	**Youssouf M'Changama**	16	78	0.21	2010–present
3	**Ibroihim Youssouf**	13	57	0.23	2017–present
4	**Rafiki Saïd**	8	20	0.4	2023–present
5	**Faïz Selemani**	7	48	0.15	2017–present
6	**Myziane Maolida**	5	20	0.25	2023–present
6	**Benjaloud Youssouf**	5	53	0.09	2015–present
8	**Affane Djambae**	4	14	0.29	2023–present
8	Ahmed Mogni	4	31	0.13	2015–2024
10	Ali Nassim M'Changama	3	11	0.27	2019–2022
10	**Boina Bacar Raïdou**	3	23	0.13	2015–present
10	**Mohamed Youssouf**	3	46	0.07	2011–present

== Competitive record ==
=== FIFA World Cup ===
FIFA World Cup record									Qualification record					
Year	Round	Position	Pld	W	D	L	GF	GA	Pld	W	D	L	GF	GA
1930 to 1974	Part of France								Part of France					
1978 to 2006	Not affiliated with FIFA								Not affiliated with FIFA					
(South Africa) 2010	Did not qualify								2	0	0	2	2	10
(Brazil) 2014	Did not qualify								2	0	0	2	1	5
(Russia) 2018	Did not qualify								4	0	3	1	1	3
(Qatar) 2022	Did not qualify								2	0	1	1	1	3
(Canada) (Mexico) (United States) 2026	Did not qualify								10	5	0	5	12	13
(Morocco) (Portugal) (Spain) 2030	To be determined													
(Saudi Arabia) 2034	To be determined													
Total		0/4							20	5	4	11	17	34

=== Olympic Games ===
Olympic Games record
Appearances: 0
Year	Round	Position	Pld	W	D	L	GF	GA
(France) 1900 to (West Germany) 1972	Part of France							
(Canada) 1976 to (Spain) 1992	Not affiliated with the IOC							
(United States) 1996 to (Greece) 2004	Not affiliated with FIFA							
(China) 2008	Did not enter							
(United Kingdom) 2012	Did not enter							
(Brazil) 2016	Did not enter							
(Japan) 2020	Did not enter							
(France) 2024	Did not enter							
Total		0/28						

- Football at the Summer Olympics has been an under-23 tournament since the 1992 edition.

=== Africa Cup of Nations ===
Africa Cup of Nations record										Qualification record					
Year	Round	Position	Pld	W	D	L	GF	GA	Squad	Pld	W	D	L	GF	GA
(Sudan) 1957	Part of France									Part of France					
(United Arab Republic) 1959	Part of France									Part of France					
(Ethiopia) 1962	Part of France									Part of France					
(Ghana) 1963	Part of France									Part of France					
(Tunisia) 1965	Part of France									Part of France					
(Ethiopia) 1968	Part of France									Part of France					
(Sudan) 1970	Part of France									Part of France					
(Egypt) 1974	Part of France									Part of France					
(Ethiopia) 1976	Not a member of CAF									Not a member of CAF					
(Ghana) 1978	Not a member of CAF									Not a member of CAF					
(Nigeria) 1980	Not a member of CAF									Not a member of CAF					
(Libya) 1982	Not a member of CAF									Not a member of CAF					
(Ivory Coast) 1984	Not a member of CAF									Not a member of CAF					
(Egypt) 1986	Not a member of CAF									Not a member of CAF					
(Morocco) 1988	Not a member of CAF									Not a member of CAF					
(Algeria) 1990	Not a member of CAF									Not a member of CAF					
(Senegal) 1992	Not a member of CAF									Not a member of CAF					
(Tunisia) 1994	Not a member of CAF									Not a member of CAF					
(South Africa) 1996	Not a member of CAF									Not a member of CAF					
(Burkina Faso) 1998	Not a member of CAF									Not a member of CAF					
(Ghana) (Nigeria) 2000	Not a member of CAF									Not a member of CAF					
(Mali) 2002	Not a member of CAF									Not a member of CAF					
(Tunisia) 2004	Did not enter									Did not enter					
(Egypt) 2006	Did not enter									Did not enter					
(Ghana) 2008	Did not enter									Did not enter					
(Angola) 2010	Did not qualify									2	0	0	2	2	10
(Equatorial Guinea) (Gabon) 2012	Did not qualify									6	0	1	5	2	14
(South Africa) 2013	Did not enter									Did not enter					
(Equatorial Guinea) 2015	Did not qualify									2	0	1	1	1	2
(Gabon) 2017	Did not qualify									6	1	0	5	2	7
(Egypt) 2019	Did not qualify									8	2	3	3	8	10
(Cameroon) 2021	Round of 16	16th	4	1	0	3	4	7	Squad	6	2	3	1	4	6
(Ivory Coast) 2023	Did not qualify									6	2	1	3	6	8
(Morocco) 2025	Group stage	18th	3	0	2	1	0	2	Squad	6	3	3	0	7	4
(Kenya) (Tanzania) (Uganda) 2027	To be determined									To be determined					
(African Union) 2029	To be determined									To be determined					
Total	Round of 16	2/35	7	1	2	4	4	9	—	42	10	12	20	32	61

=== African Games ===
African Games record
Appearances: 0
Year	Round	Position	Pld	W	D	L	GF	GA
(Republic of the Congo) 1965 to (Nigeria) 1973	Part of France							
(Algeria) 1978 to (Egypt) 1991	Not affiliated with the IOC							
(Zimbabwe) 1995	Did not enter							
(South Africa) 1999	Did not enter							
(Nigeria) 2003	Did not enter							
(Algeria) 2007	Did not enter							
(Mozambique) 2011	Did not enter							
(Republic of the Congo) 2015	Did not enter							
(Morocco) 2019	Did not enter							
Total		0/12						

- Prior to the Cairo 1991 campaign, Football at the All-Africa Games was open to full senior national teams.

=== African Nations Championship ===
African Nations Championship record									Qualification record					
Appearances: 0									Appearances: 5					
Year	Round	Position	Pld	W	D	L	GF	GA	Pld	W	D	L	GF	GA
(Ivory Coast) 2009	Did not enter								Did not enter					
(Sudan) 2011	Did not enter								Did not enter					
(South Africa) 2014	Did not qualify								2	0	1	1	0	2
(Rwanda) 2016	Did not qualify								2	0	1	1	0	2
(Morocco) 2018	Did not qualify								4	2	0	2	4	4
(Cameroon) 2020	Did not qualify								2	0	1	1	0	2
(Algeria) 2022	Did not qualify								2	0	1	1	0	1
(Kenya) (Tanzania) (Uganda) 2024	To be determined								To be determined					
Total	-	0/7	0	0	0	0	0	0	12	2	4	6	4	11

=== COSAFA Cup ===
COSAFA Cup record
Appearances: 8
Year	Round	Result	Pld	W	D	L	GF	GA
1997 to 2007	Not affiliated with COSAFA							
(South Africa) 2008	Group stage	11th	3	0	0	3	0	5
(Zimbabwe) 2009	Group stage	5th	3	1	1	1	2	4
(Angola) 2010	Cancelled							
(Zambia) 2013	Did not enter							
(South Africa) 2015	Did not enter							
(Namibia) 2016	Did not enter							
(South Africa) 2017	Did not enter							
(South Africa) 2018	Group stage	12th	3	0	1	2	1	5
(South Africa) 2019	Quarter-finals	8th	3	1	1	1	4	5
(South Africa) 2020	Cancelled due to COVID-19 pandemic							
(South Africa) 2021	Withdrew							
(South Africa) 2022	Group stage	12th	3	1	0	2	3	5
(South Africa) 2023	Group stage	8th	3	1	0	2	4	4
(South Africa) 2024	Fourth place	4th	5	2	1	2	6	4
(South Africa) 2025	Third place	3rd	4	2	1	1	3	3
Total	Third place	8/23	27	8	4	14	23	35

=== Indian Ocean Island Games ===
Indian Ocean Island Games record
Appearances: 10
Year	Round	Position	Pld	W	D	L	GF	GA
(Réunion) 1979	Bronze medalists	3rd	4	1	0	3	4	12
(Mauritius) 1985	Bronze medalists	3rd	3	1	1	1	4	3
(Madagascar) 1990	Fourth place	4th	4	1	0	3	2	8
(Seychelles) 1993	Group Stage	5th	2	0	0	2	0	8
(Réunion) 1998	Group Stage	5th	2	0	0	2	0	6
(Mauritius) 2003	Fourth place	4th	4	0	0	4	0	12
(Madagascar) 2007	Group stage	6th	2	0	1	1	1	4
(Seychelles) 2011	Group stage	5th	3	0	2	1	2	4
(Réunion) 2015	Group stage	7th	2	0	0	2	0	6
(Mauritius) 2019	Group stage	5th	3	2	0	1	4	2
(Madagascar) 2023	Fourth place	4th	4	0	2	2	3	7
Total	Bronze medalists	11/11	33	5	6	22	20	72

=== Arab Nations Cup/FIFA Arab Cup ===
FIFA Arab Cup record									Qualification record					
Appearances: 0														
Year	Round	Position	Pld	W	D	L	GF	GA	Pld	W	D	L	GF	GA
(Lebanon) 1963	Part of France								Part of France					
(Kuwait) 1964	Part of France								Part of France					
(Iraq) 1966	Part of France								Part of France					
(Saudi Arabia) 1985	Did not enter								Did not enter					
(Jordan) 1988	Did not enter								Did not enter					
(Syria) 1992	Did not enter								Did not enter					
(Qatar) 1998	Withdrew								Withdrew					
(Kuwait) 2002	Did not enter								Did not enter					
2009	Did not qualify ^{1}								2	1	0	1	4	3
(Saudi Arabia) 2012	Did not enter								Did not enter					
(Qatar) 2021	Did not qualify								1	0	0	1	1	5
(Qatar) 2025	Group stage	16th	3	0	0	3	3	8	1	0	1	0	4	4
Total		1/11	3	0	0	3	3	8	4	1	1	2	9	12

^1 The 2009 edition was cancelled during qualification.

=== Arab Games ===
Arab Games record
Appearances: 0
Year	Round	Position	Pld	W	D	L	GF	GA
(Egypt) 1953 to (United Arab Republic) 1965	Part of France							
(Syria) 1976 to (Syria) 1992	Not affiliated with the UANOC							
(Lebanon) 1997	Did not enter							
(Jordan) 1999	Did not enter							
(Algeria) 2004	No tournament							
(Egypt) 2007	Did not enter							
(Qatar) 2011	Did not enter							
Total		0/11						

== Head-to-head record ==
As of 17 November 2026, after the match against Congo

Opponent	Pld	W	D	L	GF	GA	GD
Angola	3	0	1	2	2	5	–3
Botswana	4	1	1	2	2	3	–1
Burkina Faso	4	0	1	3	2	6	−4
Burundi	1	1	0	0	1	0	+1
Cameroon	4	0	1	3	3	9	−6
Cape Verde	1	1	0	0	2	1	+1
Central African Republic	2	2	0	0	6	2	+4
Chad	2	2	0	0	3	0	+3
Congo	2	1	1	0	1	0	+1
Djibouti	1	1	0	0	4	2	+2
Egypt	2	0	1	1	0	4	−4
Equatorial Guinea	1	1	0	0	1	0	+1
Eswatini	2	0	1	1	2	+5	−3
Ethiopia	1	1	0	0	2	1	+1
Gabon	2	0	1	1	1	2	−1
Gambia	2	1	1	0	3	2	+1
Ghana	5	2	1	2	4	5	–1
Guinea	1	1	0	0	1	0	+1
Ivory Coast	3	0	0	3	2	8	−6
Kazakhstan	1	0	0	1	0	1	–1
Kenya	6	2	3	1	8	6	+2
Kosovo	1	0	0	1	2	4	−2
Lesotho	5	2	2	1	4	2	+2
Libya	3	1	1	1	3	5	−2
Madagascar	14	2	2	10	8	30	−22
Malawi	5	1	0	4	3	7	−4
Maldives	4	2	2	0	9	5	+4
Mali	3	0	1	2	0	6	–6
Mauritania	1	1	0	0	1	0	+1
Mauritius	9	2	1	6	6	22	−16
Mayotte	1	0	0	1	0	2	−2
Morocco	5	0	1	4	3	10	−7
Mozambique	6	0	1	5	3	14	−11
Namibia	7	4	1	2	8	6	+2
Oman	1	0	0	1	1	2	−1
Palestine	1	0	0	1	1	5	−4
Réunion	7	2	1	4	4	13	−9
Saudi Arabia	1	0	0	1	1	3	−2
South Africa	3	0	1	2	1	4	−3
Senegal	1	0	0	1	0	1	−1
Seychelles	6	4	2	0	15	4	+11
Sierra Leone	1	1	0	0	2	0	+2
Togo	6	1	3	2	4	7	−3
Tunisia	3	1	1	1	2	2	0
Uganda	3	1	0	2	4	2	+2
Yemen	2	0	1	1	4	6	−2
Zambia	8	2	2	4	6	11	−5
Zimbabwe	4	0	1	3	0	5	−5
47 Countries	151	39	35	78	125	225	−100

== Honours ==
=== Regional ===
- Indian Ocean Island Games
  - (bronze) Bronze Medal (2): 1979, 1985
