= 2027 Africa Cup of Nations qualification Group D =

2027 AFCON qualifying group D

Group D of the 2027 Africa Cup of Nations qualification is one group of twelve groups that will decide the teams which will qualify for the 2027 Africa Cup of Nations final tournament in Kenya, Tanzania and Uganda. The group consists of four teams: South Africa, Guinea, finals co-hosts Kenya and Eritrea.

The teams will play against each other in a home-and-away round-robin format between September 2026 and March 2027.

== Standings ==
Pos	Team	Pld	W	D	L	GF	GA	GD	Pts	Qualification	(South Africa)	(Guinea)	(Kenya)	(Eritrea)
1	South Africa	4	3	1	0	11	4	+7	10	Final tournament	—	2–1	2–2	28 Mar
2	Guinea	4	3	0	1	7	4	+3	9		24 Mar	—	1–0	2–1
3	Kenya (Note: Kenya has already qualified for the final tournament as a host nation.) (Q)	4	0	2	2	4	6	−2	2	Final tournament	1–2	28 Mar	—	1–1
4	Eritrea (E)	4	0	1	3	3	11	−8	1		0–5	1–3	24 Mar	—

Updated to match(es) played on 17 November 2026. Source: CAF
Rules for classification: Tiebreakers
(E) Eliminated; (Q) Qualified for the phase indicated

== Matches ==
All kick-off times are local.

26 September 2026
16:00 UTC+3

Kenya	1–1	Eritrea
Ogam 87'	Report	Netabay 36'

Nyayo National Stadium, Nairobi
Referee: Mohamed Athoumani (Comoros)
26 September 2026
15:00 UTC+2

South Africa	2–1	Guinea
Okon 30'; Kabini 77'	Report	Cissé 69'

Orlando Stadium, Johannesburg
Referee: Brahamou Sadou Ali (Niger)

30 September 2026
19:00 UTC+3

Eritrea	0–5	South Africa
	Report	Mofokeng 19', 45+1'; Sithole 52'; Rayners 63'; Singh 90+4'

Al Salam Stadium, Cairo (Egypt)
Referee: Lamin Jammeh (Gambia)
1 October 2026
16:00 UTC+0

Guinea	1–0	Kenya
Guirassy 32'	Report

28 September Stadium, Conakry
Referee: Mohamed Maarouf (Egypt)

12 November 2026
17:00 UTC+0

Guinea	2–1	Eritrea
Soumah 13'; Y. Barry 53'	Report	Lundgren 82'

28 September Stadium, Conakry
Referee: Patrick Tanguy Vlei (Ivory Coast)
13 November 2026
18:00 UTC+2

South Africa	2–2	Kenya
Wanjala 9' (o.g.); Mofokeng 77'	Report	Olunga 44' (pen.); Ogam 90'

Orlando Stadium, Johannesburg
Referee: Tanguy Mebiame (Gabon)

16 November 2026
18:00 UTC+2

Eritrea	1–3	Guinea
Sulieman 90+2'	Report	Soumah 28'; Y. Barry 52', 77'

Al Salam Stadium, Cairo (Egypt)
Referee: Godfrey Nkhakananga (Malawi)
17 November 2026
19:00 UTC+3

Kenya	1–2	South Africa
Bajaber 89'	Report	Mofokeng 68', 86'

Nyayo National Stadium, Nairobi
Referee: Dahane Beida (Mauritania)

24 March 2027

Eritrea	v	Kenya
	Report

24 March 2027

Guinea	v	South Africa
	Report

28 March 2027

Kenya	v	Guinea
	Report

28 March 2027

South Africa	v	Eritrea
	Report

== Goalscorers ==
There have been 25 goals scored in 8 matches, for an average of 3.12 goals per match (as of 17 November 2026).

5 goals

- (South Africa) Relebohile Mofokeng

3 goals

- (Guinea) Yakhouba Gnagna Barry

2 goals

- (Guinea) Mohamed Soumah
- (Kenya) Ryan Ogam

1 goal

- (Eritrea) Maill Lundgren
- (Eritrea) Nahom Netabay
- (Eritrea) Ali Sulieman
- (Guinea) Seydouba Cisse
- (Guinea) Serhou Guirassy
- (Kenya) Mohammed Bajaber
- (Kenya) Michael Olunga
- (South Africa) Samukelo Kabini
- (South Africa) Ime Okon
- (South Africa) Iqraam Rayners
- (South Africa) Luther Singh
- (South Africa) Sphephelo Sithole

1 own goal

- (Kenya) Amos Wanjala (against South Africa)
