= Alemseged =

Alemseged is both a surname and a given name. Notable people with the name include:

- Zeresenay Alemseged (born 1969), Ethiopian paleoanthropologist
- Alemseged Assefa, Ethiopian banker
- Alemseged Efrem (born 1970), Eritrean football coach
