= Assefa =

Assefa (Amharic: አሰፋ) can be both a masculine given name and a surname. Notable people with the name include:

== People with the surname Assefa ==
- Abraham Assefa, Ethiopian long-distance runner
- Alemseged Assefa, Ethiopian banker
- Alexander Assefa (born 1983), American politician
- Astrid Assefa, Swedish singer, actress, and theatre director
- Behailu Assefa (born 1989), Ethiopian football midfielder
- Fasil Assefa (born 1984), Ethiopian painter
- Fitsum Assefa, Ethiopian politician and teacher
- Getachew Assefa, Ethiopian politician
- Hizkias Assefa, Ethiopian consultant
- Mahder Assefa, Ethiopian actress
- Meskerem Assefa (born 1985), Ethiopian runner
- Raji Assefa, Ethiopian long-distance runner
- Samuel Assefa, Ethiopian academic and diplomat
- Sofia Assefa (born 1987), Ethiopian long-distance runner
- Tewodros Assefa, Ethiopian rapper
- Tigst Assefa (born 1994), Ethiopian long-distance runner

== People with the given name Assefa ==
- Assefa Abiyo, Ethiopian politician
- Assefa Mezgebu (born 1978), Ethiopian long-distance runner
- Assefa Gebre-Mariam Tessema, Ethiopian poet and academic
