= Gabon national football team results (2020–present) =

This article provides details of international football games played by the Gabon national football team from 2020 to present.

== Results ==
Key
| Win |
| Draw |
| Defeat |

=== 2020 ===
| 12 November 2020 2021 AFCONQ | Gabon | 2–1 | Gambia | Franceville, Gabon |
| 20:00 UTC+1 | Bouanga 8'; Aubameyang 55' | Report | Jobe 81' | Stadium: Stade de Franceville; Referee: Kouassi Attiogbe (Togo) |

| 16 November 2020 2021 AFCONQ | Gambia | 2–1 | Gabon | Bakau, Gambia |
| 16:00 UTC+0 | Mo. Barrow 49'; Mu. Barrow 79' | Report | Ecuele Manga 89' | Stadium: Independence Stadium; Referee: Pacifique Ndabihawenimana (Burundi) |

=== 2021 ===
| 25 March 2021 2021 AFCONQ | Gabon | 3–0 | DR Congo | Franceville, Gabon |
| 17:00 UTC+1 | Boupendza 44'; Bouanga 72'; Aubameyang 86' | Report | | Stadium: Stade de Franceville; Referee: Janny Sikazwe (Zambia) |

| 29 March 2021 2021 AFCONQ | Angola | 2–0 | Gabon | Luanda, Angola |
| 17:00 UTC+1 | Show 63'; Augusto 69' | Report | | Stadium: Estádio 11 de Novembro; Referee: Gehad Grisha (Egypt) |

| 1 September 2021 2022 World Cup qualification | Libya | 2–1 | Gabon | Benghazi, Libya |
| 21:00 UTC+2 | Salama 27'; Al Warfali 90+5' | Report | Poko 11' | Stadium: Martyrs of February Stadium; Referee: Bamlak Tessema Weyesa (Ethiopia) |

| 5 September 2021 2022 World Cup qualification | Gabon | 1–1 | Egypt | Franceville, Gabon |
| 20:00 UTC+1 | Allevinah 73' | Report | Mohamed 90' | Stadium: Stade de Franceville; Referee: Bakary Gassama (Gambia) |

| 8 October 2021 2022 World Cup qualification | Angola | 3–1 | Gabon | Luanda, Angola |
| 18:30 UTC+1 | Zini 25'; Papel 56'; Buatu 90+1' | Report | Méyé 83' | Stadium: Estádio 11 de Novembro; Referee: Souleiman Ahmed Djamal (Djibouti) |

| 11 October 2021 2022 World Cup qualification | Gabon | 2–0 | Angola | Franceville, Gabon |
| 14:00 UTC+1 | Aubameyang 74'; Carneiro 84' (o.g.) | Report | | Stadium: Stade de Franceville; Referee: Maguette N'Diaye (Senegal) |

| 12 November 2021 2022 World Cup qualification | Gabon | 1–0 | Libya | Franceville, Gabon |
| 14:00 UTC+1 | Aubameyang 54' (pen.) | Report | | Stadium: Stade de Franceville; Referee: Mashood Ssali (Uganda) |

| 16 November 2021 2022 World Cup qualification | Egypt | 2–1 | Gabon | Alexandria, Egypt |
| 15:00 UTC+2 | Magdy 4' (pen.); Obiang 75' (o.g.) | Report | Allevinah 54' | Stadium: Borg El Arab Stadium; Referee: Georges Gatogato (Burundi) |

=== 2022 ===
| 2 January 2022 Friendly | Burkina Faso | 3–0 | Gabon | Dubai, United Arab Emirates |
| 19:00 UTC+4 | | Report | | Stadium: The Sevens Stadium |

| 4 January 2022 Friendly | Mauritania | 1–1 | Gabon | Dubai, United Arab Emirates |
| 17:00 UTC+4 | | Report | | Stadium: Maktoum bin Rashid Al Maktoum Stadium; Referee: Omar Mohamed Al Ali (United Arab Emirates) |

| 10 January 2022 2021 AFCON GS | Comoros | 0–1 | Gabon | Yaoundé, Cameroon |
| 20:00 UTC+1 | | Report | Boupendza 16' | Stadium: Stade Ahmadou Ahidjo; Referee: Peter Waweru (Kenya) |

| 14 January 2022 2021 AFCON GS | Gabon | 1–1 | Ghana | Yaoundé, Cameroon |
| 20:00 UTC+1 | Allevinah 88' | Report | A. Ayew 18' | Stadium: Stade Ahmadou Ahidjo; Referee: Lahlou Benbraham (Algeria) |

| 18 January 2022 2021 AFCON GS | Gabon | 2–2 | Morocco | Yaoundé, Cameroon |
| 20:00 UTC+1 | Allevinah 21'; Aguerd 81' (o.g.) | Report | Boufal 74' (pen.); Hakimi 84' | Stadium: Stade Ahmadou Ahidjo; Referee: Dahane Beida (Mauritania) |

| 23 January 2022 2021 AFCON R16 | Burkina Faso | 1–1 (a.e.t.) (7–6 p) | Gabon | Limbe, Cameroon |
| 17:00 UTC+1 | B. Traoré 28' | Report | Guira 90+1' (o.g.) | Stadium: Limbe Stadium; Referee: Rédouane Jiyed (Morocco) |
| | Penalties |
| | Kaboré (penalty scored); S. Ouattara (penalty scored); E. Tapsoba (penalty scored); Simporé (penalty missed); Yago (penalty scored); Guira (penalty scored); Konaté (penalty scored); A. Tapsoba (penalty missed); I. Ouédraogo (penalty scored) | | (penalty scored) Bouanga; (penalty scored) Méyé; (penalty scored) Boupendza; (penalty missed) Kanga; (penalty scored) Biyogo Poko; (penalty scored) Ecuele Manga; (penalty scored) Ameka; (penalty missed) N'Gakoutou; (penalty missed) Palun |

| 4 June 2022 2023 AFCON Q | DR Congo | 0–1 | Gabon | Kinshasa, DR Congo |
| 17:00 UTC+1 | | Report | Babicka 23' | Stadium: Stade des Martyrs; Referee: Bernard Camille (Seychelles) |

| 8 June 2022 2023 AFCON Q | Gabon | 0–0 | Mauritania | Franceville, Gabon |
| 17:00 UTC+1 | | Report | | Stadium: Stade de Franceville; Referee: Messie Nkounkou (Congo) |

| 17 November 2022 Friendly | Gabon | 3–1 | Guinea-Bissau | Antalya, Turkey |
| 12:00 UTC+3 | Boupendza 7' (pen.), 47'; Méyé 65' | Report | Jardel 45+1' (pen.) |

| 20 November 2022 Friendly | Gabon | 3–1 | Niger | Antalya, Turkey |
| 11:00 UTC+3 | Allevinah 26', 34'; Marcolino 80' | Report | Adebayor 47' (pen.) |

=== 2023 ===
| 23 March 2023 AFCON Q | Gabon | 1–0 | Sudan | Franceville, Gabon |
| 20:00 UTC+1 | Palun 71' | Report | | Stadium: Stade de Franceville; Referee: Haythem Guirat (Tunisia) |

| 27 March 2023 AFCON Q | Sudan | 1–0 | Gabon | Omdurman, Sudan |
| 22:00 UTC+2 | Kome 67' | Report | | Stadium: Al Hilal Stadium; Referee: Lotfi Bekouassa (Algeria) |

| 18 June 2023 AFCON Q | Gabon | 0–2 | DR Congo | Franceville, Gabon |
| 19:00 UTC+1 | | Report | Tshibola 34'; Mayele 83' | Stadium: Stade de Franceville; Referee: Amin Omar (Egypt) |

| 9 September 2023 AFCON Q | Mauritania | 2–1 | Gabon | Nouakchott, Mauritania |
| 16:00 UTC+0 | Tanjy 30'; Kamara 42' | Report | Ndong 90+1' | Stadium: Stade Cheikha Ould Boïdiya; Referee: Mustapha Ghorbal (Algeria) |

| 17 October Friendly | Guinea | 1–1 | Gabon | Algarve, Portugal |
| 02:00 UTC+1 | Guirassy 36' | Report | Boupendza 62' (pen.) | Stadium: Estádio Algarve |

| 16 November 2026 World Cup qualification | Gabon | 2–1 | Kenya | Franceville, Gabon |
| 17:00 UTC+1 | Bouanga 60'; Kanga 88' | Report | Juma 40' | Stadium: Stade de Franceville; Referee: Mohamed Maarouf Eid Mansour (Egypt) |

| 19 November 2026 World Cup qualification | Burundi | 1–2 | Gabon | Dar es Salaam, Tanzania |
| 16:00 UTC+3 | Bigirimana 87' | Report | Allevinah 35'; Bouanga 83' | Stadium: National Stadium; Referee: Issa Sy (Senegal) |

=== 2024 ===
| 22 March Friendly | Senegal | 3–0 | Gabon | Amiens, France |
| 20:30 UTC+1 | Appindangoyé 12' (o.g.); Faye 44'; Mané 90+2' | Report | | Stadium: Stade de la Licorne; Referee: Stéphanie Frappart (France) |

| 25 March Friendly | Gabon | 1–1 | Congo | Chambly, France |
| 20:30 UTC+1 | Lemina 42' | Report | Ganvoula 73' | Stadium: Stade des Marais |

| 7 June 2026 World Cup qualification | Ivory Coast | 1–0 | Gabon | Korhogo, Ivory Coast |
| 19:00 UTC+0 | S. Fofana 36' | Report | | Stadium: Amadou Gon Coulibaly Stadium; Attendance: 17,522; Referee: Omar Abdulkadir Artan (Somalia) |

| 11 June 2026 World Cup qualification | Gabon | 3–2 | Gambia | Franceville, Gabon |
| 20:00 UTC+1 | Allevinah 52'; Aubameyang 70'; Bouanga 71' | Report | Minteh 33'; Adams 76' | Stadium: Stade de Franceville; Referee: Sadok Selmi (Tunisia) |

| 6 September 2025 AFCON qualification | Morocco | 4–1 | Gabon | Agadir, Morocco |
| 20:00 UTC+1 | Ziyech 10' (pen.), 26' (pen.); Brahim 59'; El Kaabi 82' | Report | Aubameyang 40' (pen.) | Stadium: Adrar Stadium; Attendance: 38,000; Referee: Dahane Beida (Mauritania) |

| 10 September 2025 AFCON qualification | Gabon | 2–0 | Central African Republic | Franceville, Gabon |
| 17:00 UTC+1 | Aubameyang 11' (pen.); Babicka 40' | Report | | Stadium: Stade de Franceville; Attendance: 8,679; Referee: Peter Waweru (Kenya) |

| 11 October 2025 AFCON qualification | Gabon | 0–0 | Lesotho | Franceville, Gabon |
| 20:00 UTC+1 | | Report | | Stadium: Stade de Franceville; Referee: Adissa Abdul Raphiou Ligali (Benin) |

| 15 October 2025 AFCON qualification | Lesotho | 0–2 | Gabon | Durban, South Africa |
| 15:00 UTC+2 | | Report | Babicka 55'; Effaghe 84' | Stadium: Moses Mabhida Stadium; Referee: Daniel Nii Laryea (Ghana) |

| 15 October 2025 AFCON qualification | Gabon | 1–5 | Morocco | Franceville, Gabon |
| 19:00 UTC+1 | Bouanga 4' | Report | Harkass 17'; Brahim 20', 23'; En-Nesyri 81'; Saibari 90' | Stadium: Stade de Franceville; Attendance: 19,360; Referee: Abongile Tom (South Africa) |

| 18 November 2025 AFCON qualification | Central African Republic | 0–1 | Gabon | Oujda, Morocco |
| 19:00 UTC+1 | | Report | Kanga 74' (pen.) | Stadium: Honor Stadium; Attendance: 33,000; Referee: Jean Jacques Ndala Ngambo (Congo DR) |

=== 2025 ===
| 28 February 2024 CHAN qualification | Gambia | 0–0 | Gabon | Thiès, Senegal |
| 21:30 UTC+0 | | Report | | Stadium: Stade Lat-Dior |

| 8 March 2024 CHAN qualification | Gabon | 0–0 (a.e.t.) (3–5 p) | Gambia | Franceville, Gabon |
| 16:00 UTC+1 | | Report | | Stadium: Stade de Franceville |
| | Penalties |
| | Evouna (penalty scored); Assoumou (penalty scored); Ndong (penalty scored); Oyono (penalty missed) | | (penalty scored) Tambedou; (penalty scored) Sanyang; (penalty scored) Camara; (penalty scored) Gaye; (penalty scored) Jobe |

| 20 March 2026 World Cup qualification | Gabon | 3–0 | Seychelles | Franceville, Gabon |
| 20:00 UTC+1 | Allevinah 3'; Bouanga 30', 63' | Report (FIFA); Report (CAF) | | Stadium: Stade de Franceville; Referee: Mehrez Melki (Tunisia) |

| 23 March 2026 World Cup qualification | Kenya | 1–2 | Gabon | Nairobi, Kenya |
| 16:00 UTC+3 | Olunga 62' | Report (FIFA); Report (CAF) | Aubameyang 16', 52' (pen.) | Stadium: Nyayo National Stadium; Referee: Ibrahim Mutaz (Libya) |

| 6 June Friendly | Niger | 4–3 | Gabon | Niamey, Niger |
| 15:00 UTC+1 | Sosah 4'; Oumarou 44'; Sako 52'; Djibrilla 66' | Report | Allevinah 14'; Mobili 69'; Kanga 78' | Stadium: Stade Général Seyni Kountché |

| 9 June Friendly | Gabon | 2–0 | Guinea-Bissau | Libreville, Gabon |
| 15:00 UTC+1 | Aboghe 25'; Meyo 90+4' | Report | | Stadium: Stade Omar Bongo |

| 3 September 2026 World Cup qualification | Seychelles | 0–4 | Gabon | Saint Pierre, Mauritius |
| 17:00 UTC+4 | | (FIFA) (CAF) | Bouanga 4', 34', 38'; M'Bemba 89' | Stadium: Côte d'Or National Sports Complex; Referee: Jean Ouattara (Burkina Faso) |

| 9 September 2026 World Cup qualification | Gabon | 0–0 | Ivory Coast | Franceville, Gabon |
| 20:00 UTC+1 | | (FIFA) | | Stadium: Stade de Franceville |

| 10 October 2026 World Cup qualification | Gambia | 3–4 | Gabon | Nairobi, Kenya |
| 16:00 UTC+3 | Minteh 23'; Sidibeh 45+2', 47' | Report | Aubameyang 20', 42', 62', 76' | Stadium: Moi International Sports Centre; Referee: Joseph Ogabor (Nigeria) |

| 14 October 2026 World Cup qualification | Gabon | 2–0 | Burundi | Franceville, Gabon |
| 20:00 UTC+1 | Meyo 86'; Lemina 90+1' | Report | | Stadium: Stade de Franceville; Referee: Aklesso Gnama (Togo) |

| 13 November 2026 World Cup qualification | Nigeria | 4–1 (a.e.t.) | Gabon | Rabat, Morocco |
| | Adams 78'; Ejuke 97'; Osimhen 102', 109' | Report | M. Lemina 89' | Stadium: Moulay Hassan Stadium; Referee: Abongile Tom (South Africa) |

| 24 December 2025 AFCON GS | Cameroon | 1–0 | Gabon | Agadir, Morocco |
| 21:00 UTC+1 | Etta Eyong 6' | Report | | Stadium: Adrar Stadium; Referee: Amin Mohamed Omar (Egypt) |

| 28 December 2025 AFCON GS | Gabon | 2–3 | Mozambique | Agadir, Morocco |
| 13:30 UTC+1 | Aubameyang 45+5'; Moussounda 76' | Report | Bangal 37'; Catamo 42' (pen.); Calila 52' | Stadium: Adrar Stadium; Referee: Mehrez Melki (Tunisia) |

| 31 December 2025 AFCON GS | Gabon | 2–3 | Ivory Coast | Marrakesh, Morocco |
| 20:00 UTC+1 | Kanga 11'; Bouanga 21' | Report | Krasso 44'; Guessand 84'; Touré 90+1' | Stadium: Marrakesh Stadium; Referee: Omar Artan (Somalia) |

=== 2026 ===
| 27 March 2026 FIFA Series | Uzbekistan | 3–1 | Gabon | Tashkent, Uzbekistan |
| 19:00 UTC+5 | Shomurodov 14'; Urozov 59'; Odilov 90+4' | Report | Averlant 6' | Stadium: Milliy Stadium; Referee: Abdullo Davlatov (Tajikistan) |

| 30 March 2026 FIFA Series | Gabon | 2–2 (3–2 p) | Trinidad and Tobago | Tashkent, Uzbekistan |
| 15:00 UTC+5 | Nzé Bagnama (yellow card) 25' (yellow-red card) 56'; Kanga 33'; Essang-Matouti 54' | Report | L. García 53', 90' | Stadium: Pakhtakor Central Stadium; Referee: Ilgiz Tantashev (Uzbekistan) |
| | Penalties |
| | Kanga (penalty scored); Lemina (penalty missed); Obiang (penalty missed); Mbemba (penalty scored); Mboula (penalty scored) | | (penalty missed) Cardines; (penalty scored) Rochford; (penalty missed) Powder; (penalty scored) Moore; (penalty missed) L. García |

| 25 September 2027 AFCON Qualifiers | Morocco | 2–0 | Gabon | Rabat, Morocco |
| 20:00 UTC+1 | Mazraoui 36'; Rahimi 84' | Report | | Stadium: Prince Moulay Abdellah Stadium; Referee: Abongile Tom (South Africa) |

| 29 September 2027 AFCON Qualifiers | Gabon | 2–0 | Niger | Franceville, Gabon |
| 20:00 UTC+1 | Effaghe 53'; Bouanga 77' | Report | | Stadium: Franceville Stadium; Referee: Issa Sy (Senegal) |

== Forthcoming fixtures ==
The following matches are scheduled:

| TBD 2027 AFCON Qualifiers | Gabon | v | Morocco | TBD, Gabon |
| TBD | | | | Stadium: TBD |

| TBD 2027 AFCON Qualifiers | Niger | v | Gabon | TBD, Niger |
| TBD | | | | Stadium: TBD |

| TBD 2027 AFCON Qualifiers | Gabon | v | Lesotho | TBD, Gabon |
| TBD | | | | Stadium: TBD |

| TBD 2027 AFCON Qualifiers | Lesotho | v | Gabon | TBD, Lesotho |
| TBD | | | | Stadium: TBD |
