= Aregai =

Aregai is a surname. Notable people with the surname include:

- Abebe Aregai (1903–1960), Ethiopian military commander and Prime Minister
- Berhane Aregai (fl. 2002), Eritrean footballer
