= Negash (name) =

Negash (Amharic: ነጋሽ) is a male name of Ethiopian origin that may refer to:

- Negash Ali (born 1990), Eritrean-Danish songwriter
- Negash Teklit (born 1970), Ethiopian football coach
- Habte Negash (born 1967), Ethiopian long-distance runner
- Mesfin Negash, Ethiopian journalist
