= Minasie Solomon =

Eritrean footballer (born 1982)

Personal information
- Full name: Minasie Solomon Weldezgi
- Date of birth: 28 May 1982 (age 44)
- Place of birth: Eritrea
- Position: Goalkeeper

International career
Years	Team	Apps	(Gls)
2015	Eritrea	1	(0)

Minasie Solomon Weldezgi (born 28 May 1982) is an Eritrean former footballer who played as a goalkeeper for the Eritrea national team.
