= Tekie =

Tekie is an Eritrean given name and surname. Notable people with the name include:

- Tekie Abraha (fl. 1992–2003), Eritrean football manager
- Tesfaldet Tekie (born 1997), Eritrean-born Swedish football player
