= RCK =

RCK may refer to:

- FaroeJet, a defunct Danish airline
- Rail Club du Kadiogo, a Burkinabé sport club
- Rajiv Chowk metro station (Delhi Metro station code), in New Delhi, Delhi, India
- RC Kouba, an Algerian football club
- Refugee Consortium of Kenya
- Riddells Creek railway station (V/Line station code), Victoria, Australia
- Roy C. Ketcham High School, in Wappingers Falls, New York, United States
