= Siem Eyob-Abraha =

Eritrean footballer

Personal information
- Date of birth: 1 March 2008 (age 18)
- Place of birth: Agordat, Eritrea
- Position: Striker

Team information
- Current team: Cracovia
- Number: 27

Youth career
- 2021–2024: Manchester United
- 2024–2026: Sheffield United

Senior career*
Years	Team	Apps	(Gls)
2026–	Cracovia	0	(0)

International career^{‡}
2026–	Eritrea	3	(1)
- * Club domestic league appearances and goals as of 21:57, 4 September 2026 (UTC) ‡ National team caps and goals as of 18:19, 16 November 2026 (UTC)

Siem Eyob-Abraha (Tigrinya: ሴም እዮብ ኣብርሃ; born 1 March 2008) is an Eritrean professional footballer who plays as a striker for Ekstraklasa club Cracovia and the Eritrea national team.

== Club career ==
Eyob-Abraha was born in Agordat, Eritrea where he also attended primary school at the Yikaalo School. In 2019, he represented the Gash-Barka region at the 2019 Eritrean Regional Selected Children's Team Championships in Asmara. Later that year, his family immigrated to the United Kingdom.

After arriving in the UK, Eyob-Abraha was recruited directly by Premier League club Manchester United and joined its academy. By December 2022, the young player had signed a sportswear sponsorship with Adidas. He was part of the team's under-18 squad that participated in the 2023–24 Professional U18 Development League.

Ahead of the 2024–25 season, Eyob-Abraha went on trial with EFL Championship club Sheffield United. He was then one of thirteen youth players signed to scholarship deals in July 2024. He scored on a volley against Colchester United U18 on the second matchday of the 2024–25 season. Eyob-Abraha signed his first professional contract with the club in July 2025, keeping him at the club through at least the 2026–27 season.

=== Cracovia ===
On 3 September 2026, Eyob-Abraha was transferred to Ekstraklasa club Cracovia in Poland; he signed a two-year contract with an option to extend.

== International career ==
Eyob-Abraha was born in Eritrea and moved to England as a young boy. At age eighteen, he was called up to the Eritrea senior national team in March 2026 for two 2027 Africa Cup of Nations qualifiers against Eswatini. He was expected to start in the match alongside Ali Sulieman. The campaign would mark the first time Eritrea had entered the competition since the 2008 edition of the tournament. Eyob-Abraha made his international debut in the first match on 25 March 2026, scoring the first and game-winning goal directly from a corner kick in the 81st minute. Eritrea won the match 2–0 with Sulieman later scoring.

== Career statistics ==
=== International ===
As of match played 16 November 2026

Appearances and goals by national team and year
National team	Year	Apps	Goals
Eritrea
Eritrea	2026	3	1
Total		3	1

Scores and results list Eritrea's goal tally first, score column indicates score after each Eyob-Abraha goal.

List of international goals scored by Siem Eyob-Abraha
No.	Date	Venue	Opponent	Score	Result	Competition
1	25 March 2026	Honneur Stadium, Meknes, Morocco	Eswatini	1–0	2–0	2027 Africa Cup of Nations qualification
