= Namrud Embaye =

German-Eritrean footballer (born 2002)

- Embaye playing for TSV Schott Mainz in the 2023-24 DFB-Pokal

Personal information
- Date of birth: 9 January 2002 (age 24)
- Place of birth: Frankfurt, Germany
- Height: 1.88 m (6 ft 2 in)
- Positions: Defensive midfielder; central midfielder

Team information
- Current team: Würzburger Kickers
- Number: 6

Youth career
- –2021: Kickers Offenbach

Senior career*
Years	Team	Apps	(Gls)
2021	SV Zeilsheim	0	(0)
2021–2022	FV Bad Vilbel	21	(2)
2022–2024	TSV Schott Mainz	51	(4)
2024–2025	FC Teutonia Ottensen	23	(1)
2025–2026	FV Illertissen	25	(2)
2026–	Würzburger Kickers	11	(0)

International career^{‡}
2026–	Eritrea	6	(0)
- * Club domestic league appearances and goals as of 12 November 2026 ‡ National team caps and goals as of 16 November 2026

Namrud Embaye (born 9 January 2002) is a footballer who plays as a midfielder for FC Würzburger Kickers in the 3. Liga. Born in Germany, he represents Eritrea internationally.

== Career ==
Embaye came up in the academy of Kickers Offenbach. Leaving them in 2021, he spent a brief time in SV Zeilsheim before really starting his senior career in FV Bad Vilbel.

After spending two seasons at TSV Schott Mainz he moved to FC Teutonia Ottensen in 2024 and FV Illertissen in 2025.

In 2026 he was called up to play for Eritrea, alongside other members of the diaspora. He made his international debut in March in a two-legged face-off against Eswatini, where Eritrea won both legs.

Following 79 games in the Regionalliga, Embaye was brought to 3. Liga club FC Würzburger Kickers in the summer of 2026.
