= 2026 FIFA World Cup qualification – CAF Group F =

Association football competition in Africa

The 2026 FIFA World Cup qualification – CAF Group F was a CAF qualifying group for the 2026 FIFA World Cup. The group contained Ivory Coast, Gabon, Kenya, Gambia, Burundi and Seychelles.

The group winners, Ivory Coast, directly qualified for the World Cup, and the runners-up, Gabon, qualified for the second round to compete for a place in the inter-confederation play-offs.

== Standings ==
Pos	Team	Pld	W	D	L	GF	GA	GD	Pts	Qualification	(Ivory Coast)	(Gabon)	(The Gambia)	(Kenya)	(Burundi)	(Seychelles)
1	Ivory Coast	10	8	2	0	25	0	+25	26	2026 FIFA World Cup	—	1–0	1–0	3–0	1–0	9–0
2	Gabon	10	8	1	1	22	9	+13	25	Second round	0–0	—	3–2	2–1	2–0	3–0
3	Gambia	10	4	1	5	27	18	+9	13		0–2	3–4	—	3–3	2–0	5–1
4	Kenya	10	3	3	4	18	14	+4	12		0–0	1–2	1–3	—	1–1	5–0
5	Burundi	10	3	1	6	13	13	0	10		0–1	1–2	3–2	0–1	—	5–0
6	Seychelles	10	0	0	10	2	53	−51	0		0–7	0–4	0–7	0–5	1–3	—

Source: FIFA
Rules for classification: Tiebreakers

== Matches ==
16 November 2023
16:00 UTC+3

Burundi	3–2	Gambia
Bigirimana 31'; Nsabiyumva 35'; Abdallah 75'	Report	Barrow 45+4'; E. Colley 90+8' (pen.)

National Stadium, Dar es Salaam (Tanzania)
Referee: Djindo Louis Houngnandande (Benin)
16 November 2023
17:00 UTC+1

Gabon	2–1	Kenya
Bouanga 60'; Kanga 88'	Report	Juma 40'

Stade de Franceville, Franceville
Referee: Mohamed Maarouf Eid Mansour (Egypt)
17 November 2023
19:00 UTC+0

Ivory Coast	9–0	Seychelles
Haller 20' (pen.); Sangaré 24'; Adingra 36'; Konaté 40' (pen.), 90+5'; S. Fofana 60'; Traorè 77', 90+4'; Krasso 84' (pen.)	Report

Alassane Ouattara Stadium, Abidjan
Attendance: 23,204
Referee: Adalbert Diouf (Senegal)

19 November 2023
16:00 UTC+3

Burundi	1–2	Gabon
Bigirimana 87'	Report	Allevinah 35'; Bouanga 83'

National Stadium, Dar es Salaam (Tanzania)
Referee: Issa Sy (Senegal)
20 November 2023
19:00 UTC+3

Gambia	0–2	Ivory Coast
	Report	Kouamé 45'; S. Fofana 85'

National Stadium, Dar es Salaam (Tanzania)
Referee: Jalal Jayed (Morocco)
20 November 2023
19:00 UTC+0

Seychelles	0–5	Kenya
	Report	Olunga 3', 6'; Juma 45+3'; Onyango 62'; Omala 73'

Felix Houphouet Boigny Stadium, Abidjan (Ivory Coast)
Attendance: 404
Referee: Younoussa Camara (Guinea)

7 June 2024
15:00 UTC+2

Kenya	1–1	Burundi
Abuya 72'	Report	Abdallah 85'

Bingu National Stadium, Lilongwe (Malawi)
Referee: Jean Ouattara (Burkina Faso)
7 June 2024
19:00 UTC+0

Ivory Coast	1–0	Gabon
S. Fofana 36'	Report

Amadou Gon Coulibaly Stadium, Korhogo
Attendance: 17,522
Referee: Omar Artan (Somalia)
8 June 2024
17:00 UTC+1

Gambia	5–1	Seychelles
Badamosi 10', 66'; Barrow 52' (pen.); Minteh 55'; Sidibeh 78'	Report	Henriette 14'

Berkane Municipal Stadium, Berkane (Morocco)
Attendance: 700
Referee: Joseph Odey Ogabor (Nigeria)

11 June 2024
20:00 UTC+1

Gabon	3–2	Gambia
Allevinah 52'; Aubameyang 70'; Bouanga 71'	Report	Minteh 33'; Adams 76'

Stade de Franceville, Franceville
Referee: Sadok Selmi (Tunisia)
11 June 2024
15:00 UTC+2

Kenya	0–0	Ivory Coast
	Report

Bingu National Stadium, Lilongwe (Malawi)
Attendance: 6,000
Referee: Jalal Jayed (Morocco)
11 June 2024
20:00 UTC+1

Seychelles	1–3	Burundi
Hoareau 78'	Report	Abdallah 34'; Kanakimana 62', 69'

Berkane Municipal Stadium, Berkane (Morocco)
Referee: Mohamed Ali Moussa (Niger)

20 March 2025
20:00 UTC+1

Gabon	3–0	Seychelles
Allevinah 3'; Bouanga 30', 63'	Report

Stade de Franceville, Franceville
Referee: Mehrez Melki (Tunisia)
20 March 2025
19:00 UTC+0

Gambia	3–3	Kenya
Barrow 55', 84'; Minteh 61'	Report	Olunga 69' (pen.); Bajaber 75'; Wilson 90+6'

Alassane Ouattara Stadium, Abidjan (Ivory Coast)
Referee: Abdou Abdel Mefire (Cameroon)
21 March 2025
20:00 UTC+1

Burundi	0–1	Ivory Coast
	Report	Guessand 16'

Honneur Stadium, Meknes (Morocco)
Attendance: 1,500
Referee: Samir Guezzaz (Morocco)

23 March 2025
16:00 UTC+3

Kenya	1–2	Gabon
Olunga 62'	Report	Aubameyang 16', 52' (pen.)

Nyayo National Stadium, Nairobi
Referee: Mutaz Ibrahim (Libya)
24 March 2025
19:00 UTC+0

Ivory Coast	1–0	Gambia
Haller 15'	Report

Felix Houphouet Boigny Stadium, Abidjan
Attendance: 19,471
Referee: Ring Nyier Akech Malong (South Sudan)
25 March 2025
20:00 UTC+1

Burundi	5–0	Seychelles
Nduwarugira 22'; Bimenyimana 24', 31'; Kanakimana 50'; Girumugisha 56'	Report

Honneur Stadium, Meknes (Morocco)
Referee: Youcef Gamouh (Algeria)

3 September 2025
17:00 UTC+4

Seychelles	0–4	Gabon
	Report	Bouanga 4', 34', 38'; M'Bemba 89'

Côte d'Or National Sports Complex, Saint Pierre (Mauritius)
Referee: Jean Ouattara (Burkina Faso)
5 September 2025
16:00 UTC+3

Kenya	1–3	Gambia
Ogam 81'	Report	Sinyan 12'; Minteh 26'; Barrow 38'

Moi International Sports Centre, Nairobi
Referee: Amin Mohamed Omar (Egypt)
5 September 2025
19:00 UTC+0

Ivory Coast	1–0	Burundi
Bayo 3'	Report

Felix Houphouet Boigny Stadium, Abidjan
Referee: Bouchra Karboubi (Morocco)

9 September 2025
16:00 UTC+3

Kenya	5–0	Seychelles
Ogam 7', 38'; Sichenje 35'; Olunga 45+5' (pen.), 67'	Report

Moi International Sports Centre, Nairobi
Referee: Joseph Odey Ogabor (Nigeria)
9 September 2025
20:00 UTC+1

Gabon	0–0	Ivory Coast
	Report

Stade de Franceville, Franceville
Referee: Abdel Aziz Bouh (Mauritania)
9 September 2025
22:00 UTC+3

Gambia	2–0	Burundi
Fadera 34' (pen.); Adams 76'	Report

Nyayo National Stadium, Nairobi (Kenya)
Referee: Mohamed Maarouf Eid Mansour (Egypt)

9 October 2025
15:00 UTC+2

Burundi	0–1	Kenya
	Report	Ogam 72'

Intwari Stadium, Bujumbura
Attendance: 16,000
Referee: Hillary Hambaba (Zimbabwe)
10 October 2025
17:00 UTC+4

Seychelles	0–7	Ivory Coast
	Report	Sangaré 7' (pen.); Agbadou 17'; Diakité 32'; Guessand 39'; Y. Diomande 55'; Adingra 67'; Kessié 90'

Côte d'Or National Sports Complex, Saint Pierre (Mauritius)
Referee: Jean Ishimwe (Rwanda)
10 October 2025
16:00 UTC+3

Gambia	3–4	Gabon
Minteh 23'; Sidibeh 45+2', 47'	Report	Aubameyang 20', 42', 62', 78'

Moi International Sports Centre, Nairobi (Kenya)
Referee: Joseph Ogabor (Nigeria)

14 October 2025
17:00 UTC+4

Seychelles	0–7	Gambia
	Report	Sidibeh 2', 46'; Manneh 24', 67', 75'; Barrow 47', 52'

Côte d'Or National Sports Complex, Saint Pierre (Mauritius)
Attendance: 300
Referee: Washington N'Dolo (Liberia)
14 October 2025
20:00 UTC+1

Gabon	2–0	Burundi
Meyo 86'; M. Lemina 90+1'	Report

Stade de Franceville, Franceville
Referee: Aklesso Gnama (Togo)
14 October 2025
19:00 UTC+0

Ivory Coast	3–0	Kenya
Kessié 7'; Y. Diomande 54'; Amad 84'	Report

Alassane Ouattara Stadium, Abidjan
Attendance: 29,714
Referee: Naby Laye Touré (Guinea)

== Goalscorers ==
There were 107 goals scored in 30 matches, for an average of 3.57 goals per match.

8 goals

- (Gabon national football team) Denis Bouanga

7 goals

- (Gabon national football team) Pierre-Emerick Aubameyang
- (Gambia national football team) Musa Barrow

6 goals

- (Kenya national football team) Michael Olunga

5 goals

- (Gambia national football team) Yankuba Minteh
- (Gambia national football team) Adama Sidibeh

3 goals

- (Burundi national football team) Sudi Abdallah
- (Burundi national football team) Bienvenue Kanakimana
- (Gabon national football team) Jim Allevinah
- (Gambia national football team) Abdoulie Manneh
- (Ivory Coast national football team) Seko Fofana
- (Kenya national football team) Ryan Ogam

2 goals

- (Burundi national football team) Abedi Bigirimana
- (Burundi national football team) Bonfils-Caleb Bimenyimana
- (Gambia national football team) Ebou Adams
- (Gambia national football team) Muhammed Badamosi
- (Ivory Coast national football team) Simon Adingra
- (Ivory Coast national football team) Yan Diomande
- (Ivory Coast national football team) Evann Guessand
- (Ivory Coast national football team) Sébastien Haller
- (Ivory Coast national football team) Franck Kessié
- (Ivory Coast national football team) Karim Konaté
- (Ivory Coast national football team) Ibrahim Sangaré
- (Ivory Coast national football team) Hamed Traorè
- (Kenya national football team) Duke Abuya
- (Kenya national football team) Masoud Juma

1 goal

- (Burundi national football team) Jean-Claude Girumugisha
- (Burundi national football team) Christophe Nduwarugira
- (Burundi national football team) Frédéric Nsabiyumva
- (Gabon national football team) Guélor Kanga
- (Gabon national football team) Mario Lemina
- (Gabon national football team) Yannis M'Bemba
- (Gabon national football team) Bryan Meyo
- (Gambia national football team) Ebrima Colley
- (Gambia national football team) Alieu Fadera
- (Gambia national football team) Sheriff Sinyan
- (Ivory Coast national football team) Emmanuel Agbadou
- (Ivory Coast national football team) Vakoun Issouf Bayo
- (Ivory Coast national football team) Oumar Diakité
- (Ivory Coast national football team) Amad Diallo
- (Ivory Coast national football team) Christian Kouamé
- (Ivory Coast national football team) Jean-Philippe Krasso
- (Kenya national football team) Mohammed Bajaber
- (Kenya national football team) Benson Omala
- (Kenya national football team) Rooney Onyango
- (Kenya national football team) Collins Sichenje
- (Kenya national football team) Will Wilson
- (Seychelles national football team) Ryan Henriette
- (Seychelles national football team) Lorenzo Hoareau

== Discipline ==
A player was automatically suspended for the next match for the following infractions:

- Receiving a red card (red card suspensions could be extended for serious infractions)
- Receiving two yellow cards in two different matches (yellow card suspensions were carried forward to further qualification rounds, but not the finals or any other future international matches)

The following suspensions were served during the group stage:

Team	Player	Infraction(s)	Suspended for match(es)
Burundi	Jordi Liongola	(yellow card) vs Ivory Coast (21 March 2025); (yellow card) vs Seychelles (25 March 2025)	vs Ivory Coast (5 September 2025)
Gabon	Pierre-Emerick Aubameyang	(yellow card) vs Ivory Coast (7 June 2024); (yellow card) vs Gambia (11 June 2024)	vs Seychelles (20 March 2025)
Gabon	Mario Lemina	(yellow card) vs Gambia (11 June 2024); (yellow card) vs Kenya (23 March 2025)	vs Seychelles (3 September 2025)
Gabon	Clench Loufilou	(yellow card) vs Kenya (16 November 2023); (yellow card) vs Burundi (19 November 2023)	vs Ivory Coast (7 June 2024)
Gabon	Alex Moucketou-Moussounda	(yellow card) vs Burundi (19 November 2025); (yellow card) vs Kenya (23 March 2025)	vs Seychelles (3 September 2025)
Gambia	Edrissa Ceesay	(yellow card) vs Seychelles (8 June 2024); (yellow card) vs Gabon (11 June 2024)	vs Kenya (20 March 2025)
Gambia	Ebrima Colley	(yellow card) vs Burundi (16 November 2023); (yellow card) vs Gabon (11 June 2024)	vs Kenya (20 March 2025)
Seychelles	Brandon Labrosse	(yellow card) vs Kenya (20 November 2023); (yellow card) vs Gabon (20 March 2025)	vs Burundi (25 March 2025) (Note: Labrosse played in Seychelles' away match against Burundi. It is unknown whether FIFA or CAF will levy any penalties as Seychelles lost 5–0.)
Seychelles	Warren Mellie	(yellow card) vs Gambia (8 June 2024); (yellow card) vs Burundi (11 June 2024)	vs Gabon (20 March 2025)
Seychelles	Imra Raheriniaina	(yellow card) vs Kenya (20 November 2023); (yellow card) vs Burundi (11 June 2024)	vs Gabon (20 March 2025) (Note: Raheriniaina played in Seychelles' away matches against Gabon and Burundi. It is unknown whether FIFA or CAF will levy any penalties as Seychelles lost 3–0 and 5–0, respectively.)
