= Fasil Assefa =

Ethiopian painter (born 1984)

- Born: Fasil Assefa Beyene; 27 January 1984 (age 42); Addis Ababa, Ethiopia
- Education: Master Fine Art and Vocational Training Center, Abyssinia Fine Art and Vocational Training Center, Addis Ababa University
- Occupation: Visual artist
- Known for: Painting

Fasil Assefa Beyene (born 1984), is an Ethiopian painter, known for his dominant theme of the hustle and bustle of Merkato, and expressing Ethiopian pop art through his paintings.

He has been recognized as an Ambassador for Peace by the Universal Peace Foundation, and Inter Religious and International Federation for World Peace.

== Biography ==
Born on 27 January 1984 in Addis Ababa, to parents Asnakech Degefu and Assefa Beyene. He grew up in an orthodox environment as the youngest child out of the eleven children in his family. When Assefa was a child and still in Abedissa secondary school he was always fascinated with a Jesus painting which was in his neighbors house, and he always tried to duplicate it. Assefa's talent in drawing and painting shone after that, which made him chose painting as career path.

He graduated in 2002 from the Master Fine Art and Vocational Training Center. Followed by study at the Abyssinia Fine Art and Vocational Training Center, where he obtained a certificate in 2003. Assefa kept painting and working as an art teacher. From 2005 to 2007, he studied at the Addis Ababa University in the school of fine arts and design.

Assefa's first solo art exhibition was held in Imperial Hotel in Addis Ababa, under the name of "Colors of the Millennium". The Colors of Millennium exhibition opened the doors for Assefa as a painter.

== Exhibitions ==
=== Solo exhibitions ===
Year	Location	Title
2008	Imperial Hotel, Addis Abeba	Colors of the Millennium
2013	National Museum of Ethiopia	Colorful City

=== Group exhibitions ===
Year	Location	Title
2001	Russian Center For Science of Culture	
2002	Ethiopian National Theater Gallery	
2003	Ethiopian National Theater Gallery	
2007	Addis Ababa University, School Of Fine Arts And Design Gallery	
2011	National Museum of Ethiopia	
2011	Sheraton Addis, Addis Ababa, Ethiopia	Art Of Ethiopia 2011
2012	Sheraton Addis, Addis Ababa, Ethiopia	Art Of Ethiopia 2012
2013	Sheraton Addis, Addis Ababa, Ethiopia	Art Of Ethiopia 2013
2017	Art Revolution Taipei, Taiwan	
