= René Feller =

Dutch football manager (1942–2019)

Personal information
- Date of birth: 23 December 1942
- Place of birth: Hoorn, Netherlands
- Date of death: 18 August 2019 (aged 76)
- Place of death: Zwaag, Netherlands

Managerial career
- Years: Team
- 1997–1998: Qadsia
- 2003–2007: Eritrea U20
- 2007–2008: Eritrea
- 2008–2009: APR
- 2014: St George

René Feller (23 December 1942 – 18 August 2019) was a Dutch football manager.

== Managerial career ==
Feller worked as a pottery salesman before he was lured by a Kuwaiti refugee to become a football manager there. He then was recommended by the Eritrean ambassador in Kuwait to become manager of the Eritrean national team and then APR in Rwanda. In April 2014 it was announced that he was part of an eight-man shortlist to replace Eric Nshimiyimana as Rwanda manager. He later won the Ethiopian league with St George in 2014.

== Personal life ==
After retiring, Feller moved back to Holland to live in Zwaag and wrote a book about his adventures in African football. He died on 18 August 2019.
