= Dorian Marin =

Romanian football coach (born 1960)

Personal information
- Date of birth: 18 June 1960 (age 66)
- Place of birth: Bacău, Romania

Managerial career
- Years: Team
- 2001–2002: Hutteen
- 2003–2004: Qardaha
- 2004–2005: Racing Beirut
- 2006–2007: Eritrea
- 2006–2007: Eritrea U17
- 2007–2008: Nalubaale
- 2008: Uganda Revenue Authority
- 2009–2011: Al-Nasr Oman
- 2011–2012: Tishreen
- 2014: King Faisal Babes
- 2016–2017: Tishreen
- 2017: Leopards
- 2017–2019: Calabar Rovers

Dorian Marin (born 18 June 1960) is a Romanian football coach who last managed Nigerian side Calabar Rovers.

== Coaching career ==
In 1991, Marin attended the federal coaching school of the Romanian Football Federation which he graduated in 1992.

He began his coaching career in his native Romania where he managed lower league sides Minerul Comănești, Baia Mare and Midia Năvodari.

Between 2001 and 2004, Marin was in charge of Syrian clubs Hutteen and Qardaha before moving to Lebanon where he coached Racing Beirut in the 2004–05 season.

After quitting his job in Beirut, Marin was named coach of both the Eritrea national football team and the Eritrean under-17 simultaneously.

He managed to qualify his Eritrea U17 side at the 2007 African U-17 Championship in Togo after defeating in the qualifiers Libya, Egypt and Zambia.

In qualification for the 2008 Africa Cup of Nations, under the guidance of Marin, Eritrea finished second behind Angola, failing to qualify for the final tournament. However they beat Kenya twice and drew at home to Angola. The Eritrea side were primarily made up of local players compared to Kenya who had at least seven foreign-based footballers playing their trade in Europe. Eritrea registered massive improvement in the FIFA rankings during his tenure climbing 56 positions, from position 177 in June 2006 to 121 in July 2007.

In December 2007, Marin signed with newly promoted Ugandan Super League side Nalubaale FC. His contract was cancelled on 30 September 2008 due to the financial difficulties of the club. Marin then took control of Uganda Revenue Authority in January 2008.

In 2009, he moved to Oman managing Al-Nasr for two years before returning to Syria, where he was appointed as the new head coach of Tishreen in 2011. Unfortunately, he left the club because of the Syrian Civil War.

After Samson Siasia left Nigerian club Heartland to manage the Nigerian national team in 2010, Marin was one of four European coaches named on the shortlist to replace him.

In January 2014, it was announced that Marin took over as coach of Ghanaian side King Faisal Babes. After Kind Faisal Babes did not pay Marin's salaries for three consecutive months in the end of 2014, he left the club. Shortly after he was one of four coaches that were shortlisted to become the new head coach of the Egypt national team

In May 2017, Marin was unveiled as the new head coach of Kenyan club Leopards, thus leaving his former club Tishreen (whom he led to a second-place finish in the 2016–17 Syrian Premier League). In June, after only two matches in charge he left after a disagreement with the club's leadership.

On 6 November 2017, he was hired by Nigerian club Calabar Rovers as their new head coach. In January 2019, he stepped down from his role at Calabar.
