= Maill Lundgren =

Swedish footballer (born 2001)

Personal information
- Full name: Ismail Maill Lundgren
- Date of birth: 1 June 2001 (age 25)
- Place of birth: Örebro, Sweden
- Height: 1.70 m (5 ft 7 in)
- Positions: Midfielder; winger

Team information
- Current team: Ranheim
- Number: 7

Youth career
- –2019: IFK Haninge
- 2020: Enskede IK

Senior career*
Years	Team	Apps	(Gls)
2021	Tyresö FF	10	(1)
2021	IFK Kumla	12	(4)
2022	IFK Haninge	29	(3)
2023	Real Murcia Imperial		
2023–2024	FC Stockholm	38	(6)
2025	Degerfors IF	10	(0)
2025	→ Sandvikens IF (loan)	8	(2)
2026–	Shelbourne	13	(0)
2026–	→ Ranheim (loan)	8	(1)

International career^{‡}
2026–	Eritrea	4	(1)
- * Club domestic league appearances and goals as of 14 November 2026 ‡ National team caps and goals as of 16 November 2026

Ismail Maill Lundgren (born 1 June 2001) is an professional footballer who plays as a midfielder or winger for Norwegian First Division club Ranheim, on loan from Shelbourne. Born in Sweden, he represents the Eritrea national team.

== Club career ==
Lundgren started his career with Swedish side Tyresö FF in 2021, where he made ten league appearances and scored one goal. Two years later, he signed for Spanish side Real Murcia Imperial, where he suffered from sickness. During the summer of 2023, he signed for Swedish side FC Stockholm, where he made thirty-eight league appearances and scored six goals. Swedish newspaper Expressen wrote in 2025 that he was "one of Ettan Norra's best players" while playing for the club.

Following his stint there, he signed for Swedish side Degerfors IF in 2025, where he made ten league appearances and scored zero goals. The same year, he was sent on loan to Swedish side Sandvikens IF, where he made eight league appearances and scored two goals.

Ahead of the 2026 season, he signed for League of Ireland Premier Division side Shelbourne. On 21 July 2026, he was loaned out to Norwegian First Division side Ranheim until January 2027.

== International career ==
In August 2026, he received his first call-up to the Eritrea squad for their 2027 Africa Cup of Nations qualification preliminary round fixtures against Kenya and South Africa.

=== International statistics ===
As of match played 16 November 2026.

Appearances and goals by national team and year
National team	Year	Apps	Goals
Eritrea	2026	4	1
Total		4	1

Scores and results list Eritrea's goal tally first, score column indicates score after each Lundgren goal.

List of international goals scored by Maill Lundgren
No.	Date	Venue	Opponent	Score	Result	Competition
1.	12 November 2026	28 September Stadium, Conakry, Guinea	Guinea	1–2	1–2	2027 Africa Cup of Nations qualification
