= Eritrea national football team =

Men's association football team

Eritrea
- Nickname: (Tigrinya: ኣግማል ቀይሕ ባሕሪ) Red Sea Camels
- Association: Eritrean National Football Federation (ENFF)
- Confederation: CAF (Africa)
- Sub-confederation: CECAFA (East & Central Africa)
- Head coach: Hesham Yakan
- Captain: Ablelom Teklezghi
- Most caps: Yidnekachew Shimangus (23)
- Top scorer: Ali Sulieman (7)
- Home stadium: Cicero Stadium
- FIFA code: ERI
First colours	Second colours

FIFA ranking
- Current: 183 ▲1 (7 October 2026)
- Highest: 121 (August 2007)
- Lowest: 207 (April–May 2018, September 2019)

First international
- Pre-independence; Sudan 1–1 Eritrea (Ethiopia) (Khartoum, Sudan; 26 June 1992); Post-independence; Seychelles 0–1 Eritrea (Mumias, Kenya; 29 November 1994)

Biggest win
- Djibouti 0–3 Eritrea (Kampala, Uganda; 13 December 2019); Kenya 1–4 Eritrea (Kampala, Uganda; 17 December 2019)

Biggest defeat
- Ghana 5–0 Eritrea (Accra, Ghana; 28 February 1999); Angola 6–1 Eritrea (Luanda, Angola; 25 March 2007); Eritrea 0–5 South Africa (Cairo, Egypt; 30 September 2026)

CECAFA Cup
- Appearances: 12 (first in 1994)
- Best result: Runners-up (2019)

The Eritrea national football team (Tigrinya: ሃገራዊት ጋንታ ኩዕሶ እግሪ ኤርትራ) represents Eritrea in men's international football and it is controlled by the Eritrean National Football Federation (ENFF). It is nicknamed the Red Sea Camels. It has never qualified for the finals of the FIFA World Cup or the Africa Cup of Nations. Asmara side Red Sea FC are the main supplier for the national team and the team represents both FIFA and Confederation of African Football (CAF).

Excluding its first match-up in the pre-Independence era (which was a 1–1 draw in a friendly against Sudan in 1992), Eritrea's official maiden international game after gaining independence from Ethiopia was during the group stage of the 1994 CECAFA Cup by winning 1–0 against Seychelles. It would later advance to the semi-finals in their first participation, losing to both Tanzania and Kenya, subsequently finishing fourth. In recent years, Eritrea's national team gained notoriety as several players vanished in an attempt to seek political asylum in foreign countries, leading to numerous withdrawals from the qualifying phase of major tournaments such as the FIFA World Cup and Africa Cup of Nations: from September 2023 to March 2026, Eritrea did not even have a FIFA ranking due to inactivity.

As of 2026, the team's best result in a competition was during the most recent CECAFA Cup it participated in by finishing runner-up in 2019 as Eritrea came up short in the final by losing 3–0 to hosts Uganda.

== History ==
Joshua Yonas' team participated in a friendly tournament in Sudan in 1992, the year before Eritrea achieved independence. Eritrea participated in the 1994 CECAFA Cup, organised by the Council for East and Central Africa Football Association, even though the ENFF was not founded until 1996. The first full international was in the 1999 CECAFA Cup, the year after the ENFF joined the CAF and FIFA. They participated in the qualifying rounds of the 2000 African Cup of Nations and the 2002 World Cup, and subsequent editions until 2008. They have also appeared intermittently in the CECAFA Cup.

In the 2000 Africa Cup of Nations qualifiers, Eritrea managed a scoreless home draw versus Cameroon and a 1–0 home win over Mozambique. They finished second in their three team group, and advanced to a playoff round where they faced Senegal and Zimbabwe, but ultimately lost all four matches in that final stage.

In the first round of the qualifiers for the 2002 World Cup, they were drawn against Nigeria, and were defeated 4–0 in the away leg, after a goalless draw at home. The coach was Yilmaz Yuceturk.

In the first round of the 2006 World Cup qualifiers, Sudan was Eritrea's first round opponent. Eritrea lost the first leg 3–0, before another goalless draw in Asmara. The coach was Eritrean Tekie Abraha.

In group 6 of the qualifiers for the 2008 Africa Cup of Nations, under the guidance of Romanian Dorian Marin, Eritrea finished second behind Angola, failing to qualify for the final tournament. They beat Kenya twice and drew at home to Angola.

In the first round of the 2014 World Cup qualifiers, Eritrea faced Rwanda. The first leg in Asmara ended in a 1–1 draw (and saw Eritrea's first ever goal in a World Cup qualification match), but Rwanda took the second leg by a score of 3–1.

In the first round of the 2018 World Cup qualifiers, Eritrea faced Botswana. The first leg in Asmara saw Botswana win 2–0, and the second leg in Francistown saw Botswana win 3–1, with Botswana winning 5–1 on aggregate.

In the first round of the 2022 World Cup qualifiers, Eritrea faced Namibia. The first leg in Asmara saw Namibia win 2–1, and the second leg saw Namibia win 2–0; Namibia won 4–1 on aggregate.

Eritrea withdrew from the 2023 Africa Cup of Nations qualifiers and the 2026 World Cup qualifiers, and would not play a match for six years until May 2025, when they played two matches against the Niger A' team: from 21 September 2023 to 31 March 2026, Eritrea was left out of the FIFA rankings because they did not play a recognised match within the last four years.

On 25 March 2026, Eritrea played their first competitive game since before the COVID-19 pandemic when they participated in the 2027 Africa Cup of Nations qualification preliminary round. It was also their first AFCON-related game since 2008.

=== Withdrawals from major tournament qualifying ===
On 30 March 2014, Eritrea withdrew from the preliminary round of the 2015 Africa Cup of Nations qualifiers, likely due to a rising number of the Eritrean national team players defecting from Eritrea during away matches. They were intended to play against South Sudan, who were awarded a walkover.

On 2 March 2022, Eritrea withdrew from the preliminary round of the 2023 Africa Cup of Nations qualifiers due to the lack of a stadium that meets the requirements set by CAF to host its international matches. They were intended to play against Botswana. Botswana were also awarded a walkover.

In November 2023, Eritrea, who were drawn into Group E alongside Morocco, Zambia, Tanzania, Congo and Niger, pulled out of the 2026 World Cup qualifiers, citing the reason as being the refusal of Zemede Tekle, who is the Eritrean Commissioner for Sports and Culture, to participate in the playoffs.

=== Defections ===
Recent years have seen a high number of refugees leaving Eritrea, and some athletes travelling to competitions abroad have taken the opportunity to abscond. In December 2012, seventeen Eritrean footballers and the team's doctor vanished after the CECAFA championship tournament in Uganda and all applied for asylum in the country. Four players of Red Sea FC defected after a CAF Champions League 2006 match in Nairobi, Kenya, and up to 12 members of the national side after the 2007 CECAFA Cup in Tanzania. Another 6 players sought asylum in Angola in March 2007 after a group 6 qualifying game for the 2008 Africa Cup of Nations. Three more players from the national team sought asylum in Sudan.

Eritrea withdrew from the 2008 CECAFA Cup, and from the common qualifying tournament shared by the 2010 World Cup and the 2010 Africa Cup of Nations. Given the number of players seeking asylum, the Eritrean government began requiring athletes to pay a 100,000 nakfa surety before traveling abroad.

Eritrea returned to the 2009 CECAFA Cup in Nairobi. A young squad was assembled with just 12 days' training. In Group B, they gained a surprise draw with Zimbabwe, lost narrowly to Rwanda, and beat Somalia 3–1. They were easily beaten 4–0 in the quarter-finals by Tanzania. Twelve squad members failed to report for the return flight, and sought the assistance of the Refugee Consortium of Kenya. They were believed to be in hiding in Eastleigh, an eastern suburb of Nairobi home to many immigrants. Nicholas Musonye, the secretary-general of CECAFA, feared that the government might react by refusing to let the team travel abroad in future. The twelve players were later granted interim asylum by the United Nations High Commissioner for Refugees in Kenya. Eleven of these players have since travelled to Adelaide in Australia with two of them, Samuel Ghebrehiwet and Ambes Sium, signing for Gold Coast United in the A-League in August 2011.

In the first round of the qualifiers for the 2018 World Cup, ten players from the Eritrean football team refused to return home after playing a World Cup qualifying match in Botswana and were granted asylum there.

In September 2019, four members of the national Under-20 team sought asylum in Uganda after the team qualified for the semi-finals of a competition. A few months later in December, a further seven players selected for the international team refused to return home and sought asylum in Uganda after a tournament. In October 2021, five footballers from the country's under-20 women's team also disappeared when on international duty in Uganda.

=== Return to qualifying competitions ===
In March 2026, Eritrea won both legs against Eswatini with 4–1 on aggregate in the 2027 Africa Cup of Nations qualification preliminary round, advancing to the AFCON qualifiers for the first time in nearly two decades. However, of the ten domestic players called up for the games, only three returned, with seven suspected to have absconded in South Africa.

== Results and fixtures ==
The following is a list of match results in the last 12 months, as well as any future matches that have been scheduled.

Win Draw Loss Fixture

=== 2026 ===
25 March 2027 Africa Cup of Nations qualification	Eritrea	2–0	Eswatini	Meknes, Morocco
17:00 UTC+1	Eyob-Abraha 81'; Sulieman 90+4'	Report		Stadium: Stade d'Honneur; Referee: Moussa Diou (Mauritania)

31 March 2027 Africa Cup of Nations qualification	Eswatini	1–2	Eritrea	Lobamba, Eswatini
16:00 UTC+2	Figuareido 90+6'	Report	Sulieman 50', 59'	Stadium: Somhlolo National Stadium; Referee: Josefa Aurelio (São Tomé and Príncipe)

26 September 2027 AFCON qualification	Kenya	1–1	Eritrea	Nairobi, Kenya
16:00 UTC+3	Ogam 87'	Report	Girmai 36'	Stadium: Nyayo National Stadium; Referee: Mohamed Athoumani (Comoros)

30 September 2027 AFCON qualification	Eritrea	0–5	South Africa	Cairo, Egypt
19:00 UTC+3		Report	Mofokeng 19', 45+1'; Sithole 52'; Rayners 63'; Singh 90+4'	Stadium: Al Salam Stadium; Referee: Lamin Jammeh (Gambia)

12 November 2027 AFCON qualification	Guinea	2–1	Eritrea	Conakry, Guinea
17:00 UTC+0	Soumah 13'; Gnagna Barry 53'	Report	Lundgren 82'	Stadium: 28 September Stadium; Referee: Patrick Tanguy Vlei (Ivory Coast)

15 November 2027 AFCON qualification	Eritrea	1–3	Guinea	Cairo, Egypt
17:00 UTC+2	Sulieman 90+2'	Report	Soumah 28'; Gnagna Barry 52', 77'	Stadium: Al Salam Stadium; Referee: Godfrey Nkhakanaga (Kenya)

=== 2027 ===
24 March 2027 AFCON qualification	Eritrea	v	Kenya	TBD, Eritrea
TBD				Stadium: TBD

28 March 2027 AFCON qualification	South Africa	v	Eritrea	TBD, South Africa
TBD				Stadium: TBD

== Coaching history ==
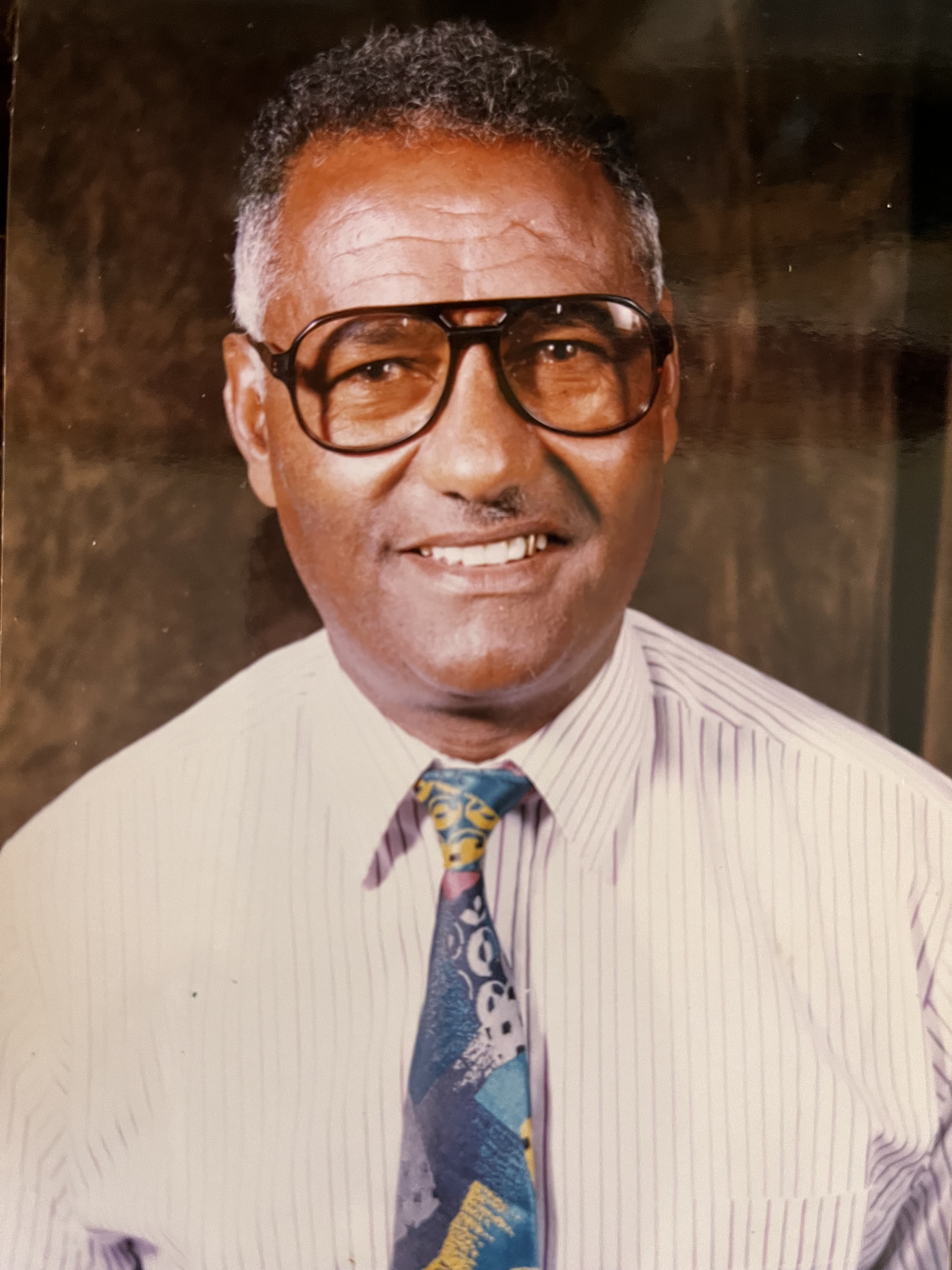
Tekie Abraha, who was born in Asmara, became the first manager of the national football team of Eritrea

- (Eritrea) Tekie Abraha (1991–1996)
- (Egypt) Mushir Osman (1998–1999)
- (Eritrea) Tekie Abraha (1999–2000)
- (Turkey) Yılmaz Yücetürk (2000–2002)
- (Eritrea) Negash Teklit (2002)
- (Federal Republic of Yugoslavia) Vojo Gardašević (2002)
- (Eritrea) Tekie Abraha (2003)
- (Eritrea) Mrad Abdul Tesfay (2004)
- (Romania) Dorian Marin (2006–2007)
- (Netherlands) René Feller (2007–2008)
- (Eritrea) Negash Teklit (2009–2012)
- (Eritrea) Omar Ahmed Hussein (2013–2015)
- (Eritrea) Alemseged Efrem (2015–2019)
- (Eritrea) Ermias Tewelde (2024–2025)
- (Egypt) Hesham Yakan (2026–present)

Caretaker managers are listed in italics

== Players ==
=== Current squad ===
- The following players were called up for the 2027 Africa Cup of Nations qualification matches against Guinea on 12 and 16 November 2026.
- Caps and goals are correct as of 16 November 2026, after the match against Guinea.

No.	Pos.	Player	Date of birth (age)	Caps	Goals	Club
1	GK	Yonathan Sultan	12 January 2007 (age 19)	6	0	(United Arab Emirates Football Association) Arabian Falcons
12	GK	Yoel Kebreab	13 September 2000 (age 26)	0	0	(Canadian Soccer Association) GS United
22	GK	Malik Abdulrahman	18 February 2006 (age 20)	0	0	(Swedish Football Association) Avesta AIK
2	DF	Jozef Misignha	23 March 2008 (age 18)	2	0	(Royal Dutch Football Association) De Graafschap U19
3	DF	Jonas Idris	17 April 2005 (age 21)	5	0	(Danish Football Association) Fremad Amager
4	DF	Jamal Ali	12 September 1998 (age 28)	5	0	(Football Australia) Preston Lions
16	DF	Hennos Asmelash	1 July 1999 (age 27)	3	0	(Moldovan Football Federation) Milsami Orhei
20	DF	Namrud Embaye	9 January 2002 (age 24)	6	0	(German Football Association) Würzburger Kickers
21	DF	Yonatan Sebhatu	19 March 2002 (age 24)	2	0	(Football Australia) SD Raiders
29	DF	Victor Fors	11 March 1999 (age 27)	5	0	(Norwegian Football Federation) Kongsvinger
	DF	Mussie Beraky	21 April 2007 (age 19)	0	0	(German Football Association) FC Gießen
5	MF	Nahom Tadese	8 May 2000 (age 26)	6	0	(Eritrean National Football Federation) Denden
8	MF	Ablelom Teklezghi (captain)	1 September 1996 (age 30)	15	0	(Eritrean National Football Federation) Red Sea
9	MF	Tesfaldet Tekie	4 June 1997 (age 29)	4	0	(Swedish Football Association) Hammarby
14	MF	Nahom Netabay	28 April 1994 (age 32)	5	1	(Swedish Football Association) Degerfors
15	MF	Yonael Yonas	23 October 2006 (age 20)	1	0	(Federation of Uganda Football Associations) Maroons
18	MF	Yoel Yilma	29 March 1999 (age 27)	1	0	(German Football Association) TSV Wiesbaden
10	FW	Ali Sulieman	12 September 2000 (age 26)	15	7	(Egyptian Football Association) Al-Masry
11	FW	Romel Abdu	28 November 2001 (age 24)	4	0	(Eritrean National Football Federation) Denden
13	FW	Oliver Hintsa	1 January 2001 (age 25)	4	0	(Romanian Football Federation) FC Dinamo București
17	FW	Siem Eyob-Abraha	1 March 2008 (age 18)	3	1	(Polish Football Association) Cracovia
19	FW	Esrom Yohannes	11 September 2002 (age 24)	4	0	(Canadian Soccer Association) Calgary Foothills
23	FW	Maill Lundgren	1 June 2001 (age 25)	4	1	(Norwegian Football Federation) Ranheim
24	FW	Awed Issac	10 April 1997 (age 29)	2	0	(German Football Association) FSV 1926 Fernwald

=== Recent call-ups ===
The following players have also been called up for the team within the last twelve months and are still available and eligible for selection.

Pos.	Player	Date of birth (age)	Caps	Goals	Club	Latest call-up
GK	Kibrom Solomon	10 September 2000 (age 26)	9	0	(Eritrea) Denden	v. Eswatini, 31 March 2026^{DEF}
GK	Awet Maharena	19 October 1994 (age 32)	0	0	(Eritrea) Red Sea	v. Eswatini, 25 March 2026^{DEF}
DF	Matteo Borsoi	11 April 2003 (age 23)	0	0	(Italy) Perugia	v. Kenya, 26 September 2026^{WD}
DF	Nahom Awet	10 November 2000 (age 26)	5	0	(Eritrea) Denden	v. Eswatini, 31 March 2026^{DEF}
DF	Wedeb Fessehaye	7 July 1999 (age 27)	2	0	(Eritrea) Al Tahrir	v. Eswatini, 31 March 2026^{DEF}
DF	Medhanie Redae	30 June 1993 (age 33)	2	0	(Eritrea) Red Sea	v. Eswatini, 31 March 2026^{DEF}
DF	Yosief Tsegay	23 January 2001 (age 25)	2	0	(Eritrea) Denden	v. Eswatini, 31 March 2026^{DEF}
MF	Joel Gerezgiher	9 October 1995 (age 31)	0	0	(Germany) FC Gießen	v. South Africa, 30 September 2026
MF	Aethan Yohannes	16 March 2004 (age 22)	0	0	(Romania) CS Dinamo București	v. Eswatini, 31 March 2026
FW	Fahmi Ibrahim	25 April 2000 (age 26)	1	0	(Philippines) Cebu	v. South Africa, 30 September 2026
FW	Filimon Gerezgiher	4 July 2000 (age 26)	2	0	(Germany) Fortuna Düsseldorf	v. South Africa, 30 September 2026
FW	Awet Alemseged	27 April 2004 (age 22)	0	0	(Norway) Grorud IL	v. South Africa, 30 September 2026
FW	Nobel Gebrezgi	18 August 2003 (age 23)	1	0	(United Arab Emirates) ISE	v. South Africa, 30 September 2026
FW	Amanuel Benhur	12 September 2000 (age 26)	2	0	(Eritrea) Red Sea	v. Eswatini, 31 March 2026^{DEF}
FW	Simon Abrahaley	1 January 2005 (age 21)	0	0	(Netherlands) ONS Sneek	v. Eswatini, 25 March 2026^{PRE}
Notes: ^{PRE} = Preliminary squad / standby; ^{WD} = Player withdrew from the squad due to non-injury issue.; ^{INJ} = Withdrew due to injury; ^{DEF} = Player defected

== Player records ==
As of 16 November 2026
Players in bold are still active with Eritrea.

=== Most appearances ===
Rank	Name	Caps	Goals	Career
1	Yidnekachew Shimangus	23	6	1998–2007
2	Yonas Fesehaye	19	5	1999–2007
3	Natnael Mesfun Zeru	16	0	1998–2003
4	**Ali Sulieman**	15	7	2019–present
4	**Ablelom Teklezghi**	15	0	2019–present
6	Abel Afeworki	13	0	1998–2002
7	Efrem Bain Kaleb	12	0	1998–2006
8	Fassil Abreha	11	3	1999–2003
8	Berhane Aregai	11	5	2002–2007

=== Top goalscorers ===
Rank	Name	Goals	Caps	Ratio	Career
1	**Ali Sulieman**	7	15	0.47	2019–present
2	Yidnekachew Shimangus	6	23	0.26	1998–2007
3	Berhane Aregai	5	11	0.45	2002–2007
3	Yonas Fesehaye	5	19	0.26	1999–2007
5	Testfaldet Goitom	3	8	0.38	2003–2009
5	Fassil Abreha	3	11	0.27	1999–2003
7	Elmon Temekribon	2	1	2	2007
7	Robel Kidane	2	7	0.29	2015–2019
7	Suleman Mohamed	2	7	0.29	2003–2007
7	Abel Okbay	2	8	0.25	2019

== Competition records ==
=== FIFA World Cup ===
FIFA World Cup									Qualification					
Year	Round	Position	Pld	W	D	L	GF	GA	Pld	W	D	L	GF	GA
1930 to 1938	Part of Italy								Part of Italy					
1950 to 1990	Part of Ethiopia								Part of Ethiopia					
1994 to 1998	Not a FIFA member								Not a FIFA member					
(South Korea) (Japan); 2002	Did not qualify								2	0	1	1	0	4
(Germany); 2006	Did not qualify								2	0	1	1	0	3
(South Africa); 2010	Did not enter								Did not enter					
(Brazil); 2014	Did not qualify								2	0	1	1	2	4
(Russia); 2018	Did not qualify								2	0	0	2	1	5
(Qatar); 2022	Did not qualify								2	0	0	2	1	4
(Canada) (Mexico) (United States); 2026	Withdrew								Withdrew					
(Morocco) (Portugal) (Spain); 2030	To be determined								To be determined					
(Saudi Arabia); 2034	To be determined								To be determined					
Total	–	0/7	–	–	–	–	–	–	10	0	3	7	4	20

=== Africa Cup of Nations ===
Africa Cup of Nations record									Qualification record					
Year	Round	Position	Pld	W	D	L	GF	GA	Pld	W	D	L	GF	GA
(Sudan) 1957	Part of Ethiopia								Part of Ethiopia					
(United Arab Republic) 1959	Part of Ethiopia								Part of Ethiopia					
(Ethiopia) 1962	Part of Ethiopia								Part of Ethiopia					
(Ghana) 1963	Part of Ethiopia								Part of Ethiopia					
(Tunisia) 1965	Part of Ethiopia								Part of Ethiopia					
(Ethiopia) 1968	Part of Ethiopia								Part of Ethiopia					
(Sudan) 1970	Part of Ethiopia								Part of Ethiopia					
(Egypt) 1974	Part of Ethiopia								Part of Ethiopia					
(Ethiopia) 1976	Part of Ethiopia								Part of Ethiopia					
(Ghana) 1978	Part of Ethiopia								Part of Ethiopia					
(Nigeria) 1980	Part of Ethiopia								Part of Ethiopia					
(Libya) 1982	Part of Ethiopia								Part of Ethiopia					
(Ivory Coast) 1984	Part of Ethiopia								Part of Ethiopia					
(Egypt) 1986	Part of Ethiopia								Part of Ethiopia					
(Morocco) 1988	Part of Ethiopia								Part of Ethiopia					
(Algeria) 1990	Part of Ethiopia								Part of Ethiopia					
(Senegal) 1992	Part of Ethiopia								Part of Ethiopia					
(Tunisia) 1994	Not affiliated with CAF								Not affiliated with CAF					
(South Africa) 1996	Not affiliated with CAF								Not affiliated with CAF					
(Burkina Faso) 1998	Not affiliated with CAF								Not affiliated with CAF					
(Ghana) (Nigeria) 2000	Did not qualify								9	1	1	7	4	22
(Mali) 2002	Did not qualify								2	1	0	1	3	6
(Tunisia) 2004	Did not qualify								6	1	0	5	1	7
(Egypt) 2006	Did not qualify								2	0	1	1	0	3
(Ghana) 2008	Did not qualify								6	2	3	1	5	8
(Angola) 2010	Withdrew								Withdrew					
(Equatorial Guinea) (Gabon) 2012	Did not enter								Did not enter					
(South Africa) 2013	Did not enter								Did not enter					
(Equatorial Guinea) 2015	Withdrew								Withdrew					
(Gabon) 2017	Did not enter								Did not enter					
(Egypt) 2019	Did not enter								Did not enter					
(Cameroon) 2021	Did not enter								Did not enter					
(Ivory Coast) 2023	Withdrew								Withdrew					
(Morocco) 2025	Excluded								Excluded					
(Kenya) (Tanzania) (Uganda) 2027	Did not qualify								4	0	1	3	3	11
Total	–	0/35	–	–	–	–	–	–	27	7	5	15	17	47

=== CECAFA Cup ===
CECAFA Cup record
Appearances: 12
Year	Round	Position	Pld	W	D	L	GF	GA
(Uganda) 1973 to (Tanzania) 1992	Part of Ethiopia							
(Kenya) 1994	Fourth place	4th	5	2	1	2	3	2
(Uganda) 1995	Did not enter							
(Sudan) 1996	Did not enter							
(Rwanda) 1999	Group stage	11th	2	0	0	2	2	6
(Uganda) 2000	Group stage	8th	4	0	1	3	4	15
(Rwanda) 2001	Group stage	11th	3	0	0	3	3	17
(Tanzania) 2002	Did not enter							
(Sudan) 2003	Did not enter							
(Ethiopia) 2004	Did not enter							
(Rwanda) 2005	Group stage	10th	4	0	0	4	2	18
(Ethiopia) 2006	Group stage	11th	3	0	0	3	0	10
(Tanzania) 2007	Quarter-finals	8th	4	2	0	2	8	8
(Uganda) 2008	Group stage	10th	4	0	1	3	2	13
(Kenya) 2009	Group stage	12th	3	0	0	3	0	13
(Tanzania) 2010	Did not enter							
(Tanzania) 2011	Group stage	11th	3	0	0	3	2	10
(Uganda) 2012	Did not enter							
(Kenya) 2013	Did not enter							
(Rwanda) 2015	Group stage	11th	3	0	0	3	0	9
(Kenya) 2017	Did not enter							
(Uganda) 2019	Runners-up	2nd	6	3	1	2	8	6
Total	0 Titles	12/40	44	7	4	33	34	127

== All-time record ==
Key

- Pld = Matches played
- W = Matches won
- D = Matches drawn
- L = Matches lost
- GF = Goals for
- GA = Goals against
- GD = Goal differential
- Countries are listed in alphabetical order

As of 16 November 2026

Positive Record Neutral Record Negative Record

Opponent	Pld	W	D	L	GF	GA	GD
Angola	2	0	1	1	2	7	-5
Botswana	2	0	0	2	1	5	-4
Burundi	4	1	2	1	3	3	0
Cameroon	2	0	1	1	0	1	-1
Djibouti	2	2	0	0	6	2	+4
Eswatini	4	2	2	0	4	1	+3
Ghana	1	0	0	1	0	5	-5
Guinea	2	0	0	2	2	5	-3
Kenya	11	3	1	7	12	15	-3
Mali	2	0	0	2	0	3	-3
Malawi	1	0	0	1	2	3	-1
Mozambique	2	1	0	1	2	3	-1
Namibia	2	0	0	2	1	4	−3
Niger	2	0	1	1	0	-1	-1
Nigeria	2	0	1	1	0	4	−4
Rwanda	10	0	2	8	7	16	−9
Senegal	2	0	0	2	2	8	−6
Seychelles	3	2	0	1	2	1	+1
Somalia	3	1	2	0	3	1	+2
South Africa	1	0	0	1	0	5	−5
Sudan	12	3	2	7	7	20	−13
Tanzania	4	0	1	3	1	7	−6
Uganda	8	1	2	5	6	17	−11
Yemen	1	0	0	1	1	4	−3
Zanzibar	2	0	1	1	0	3	-3
Zimbabwe	5	0	1	4	0	8	-8
Total	97	18	21	58	60	151	−91
