= Kibrom Solomon =

Eritrean footballer

Personal information
- Full name: Kibrom Solomon Haile
- Date of birth: 10 September 2000 (age 26)
- Place of birth: Dekemhare, Eritrea
- Height: 1.87 m (6 ft 2 in)
- Position: Goalkeeper

Team information
- Current team: Denden

Senior career*
Years	Team	Apps	(Gls)
2018–2026	Denden	64	(0)

International career^{‡}
2019–2026	Eritrea	9	(0)
- * Club domestic league appearances and goals ‡ National team caps and goals as of 18:35, 11 August 2021 (UTC)

Kibrom Solomon (born 10 September 2000) is an Eritrean professional footballer who plays as a goalkeeper for Eritrean Premier League club Denden FC and the Eritrea national team.

== International career ==
Solomon made his senior international debut on 4 September 2019 in a 2022 FIFA World Cup qualification match against Namibia. Later that year he represented Eritrea in the 2019 CECAFA Cup as the team went on to be the surprise runners-up after losing to Uganda in the final. He was then named the nation's starting goalkeeper in the 2021 CECAFA U-23 Challenge Cup. In 2026, after the 2027 Africa Cup of Nations qualifying matches against Eswatini, he fled to South Africa along with six other players and is expected to apply for asylum.

== Career statistics ==
As of match played 25 January 2020

Appearances and goals by national team and year
National team	Year	Apps	Goals
Eritrea	2019	8	0
Eritrea	2020	1	0
Total		9	0
