= Nahom Netabay =

Eritrean footballer (born 1994)

Nahom Girmai
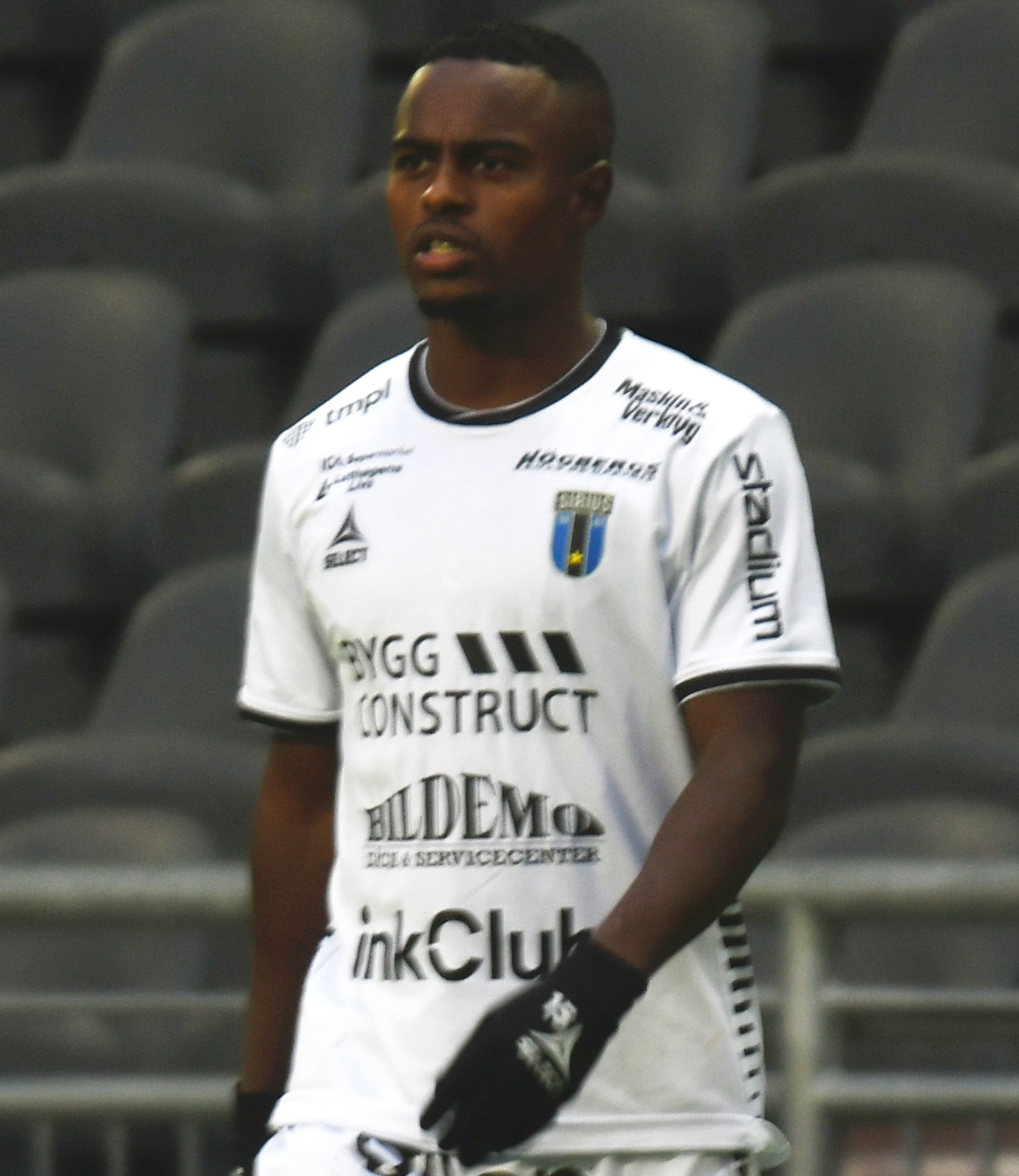

Personal information
- Full name: Nahom Girmai Netabay
- Date of birth: 14 October 1994 (age 32)
- Place of birth: Kiruna, Sweden
- Height: 1.71 m (5 ft 7 in)
- Position: Midfielder

Team information
- Current team: Degerfors IF
- Number: 8

Youth career
- Kristianstad BoIS

Senior career*
Years	Team	Apps	(Gls)
2013–2015	Kristianstads FF	55	(5)
2016–2017	Kristianstad FC	42	(10)
2018–2019	Varbergs BoIS	57	(18)
2020–2021	IK Sirius	50	(7)
2022–2023	Kalmar FF	55	(4)
2024	Næstved	13	(1)
2024–	Degerfors IF	49	(4)

International career^{‡}
2026–	Eritrea	5	(1)
- * Club domestic league appearances and goals as of 8 July 2026 ‡ National team caps and goals as of 12 November 2026

Nahom Girmai Netabay (born 28 August 1994) is an Eritrean footballer who plays as a midfielder for Degerfors IF.

== Club career ==
On 5 December 2021, Girmai signed with Kalmar for the 2022 season.

On 19 February 2024, Girmai signed with Danish 1st Division club Næstved Boldklub. He left Næstved at the end of the season, which ended with relegation to the 2024-25 Danish 2nd Division.

== International goals ==
As of match played 30 September 2026.

Appearances and goals by national team and year
National team	Year	Apps	Goals
Eritrea	2026	5	1
Total		5	1

Scores and results list Eritrea's goal tally first, score column indicates score after each Netabay goal.

List of international goals scored by Nahom Netabay
No.	Date	Venue	Opponent	Score	Result	Competition
1.	26 September 2026	Nyayo National Stadium, Nairobi, Kenya	Kenya	1–0	1–1	2027 Africa Cup of Nations qualification

== Personal life ==
Born in Sweden, Girmai is of Eritrean descent.
