= Yılmaz Yücetürk =

Turkish footballer and coach (1940–2005)

Personal information
- Date of birth: 12 March 1941/1 July 1940
- Place of birth: Gönen, Turkey/Balikesir, Turkey
- Date of death: 20 May 2005
- Place of death: Kadıköy, Istanbul, Turkey
- Position: Midfielder

Youth career
- Fenerbahce

Senior career*
Years	Team	Apps	(Gls)
1957–1961	Fenerbahce		
1961–1967	Türk Telekom GSK		
1967–1969	MKE Ankaragücü		

International career
1959	Turkey U-18	2	(0)
1964–1965	Turkey U-21		

Managerial career
- 1987: Fenerbahce (technical director)
- 1987–1988: Kuşadasıspor
- 1990–1992: Zeytinburnuspor (coach and technical director)
- 1995: Erzurumspor
- 2000–2002: Eritrea
- * Club domestic league appearances and goals

Yılmaz Yücetürk (died 20 May 2005 in Kadıköy, Istanbul) was a Turkish football coach who last managed the Eritrea national football team.

== Career ==
Rising through Fenerbahce's youth ranks, Yücetürk played for MKE Ankaragücü and PTT, the previous incarnation of Türk Telekom GSK, during his senior career. One year succeeding his retirement, Yücetürk took over the family business and never thought about a return to football; however, after going to Germany to watch the 1974 World Cup, the former player entered the Cologne Sport University as a superannuated student and got a PhD in football. More than a decade later, Yücetürk was technical director of Fenerbahce. He also served as coach for Kuşadasıspor, Zeytinburnuspor, and Erzurumspor in his later career. The former midfielder also assumed the role of president of the Turkish Football Federation's Research and Planning Department upon returning to Turkey.

In the summer of 2000, Yücetürk took charge of the Eritrea national team upon request as part of a Meridian project for African football development, an idea incubated by FIFA. There, he trained over 100 coaches and organized 5 coaching symposiums. Besides heading the Eritrean men's team, he helped develop the Eritrea women's national football team as well with the Turkish Football Federation covering half his salary.

On 20 May 2005 Yücetürk died at the Acıbadem Kozyatağı Hospital in Istanbul.

== Personal life ==
Yücetürk had a wife and two sons.

== Bibliography ==
- Yücetürk, A. Yilmaz. Antrenman, Kavrami, Prenslıperı, Plani.
