= Sheraton Addis =

Hotel in Addis Ababa, Ethiopia

Coordinates: 9.02027°N 38.76002°E

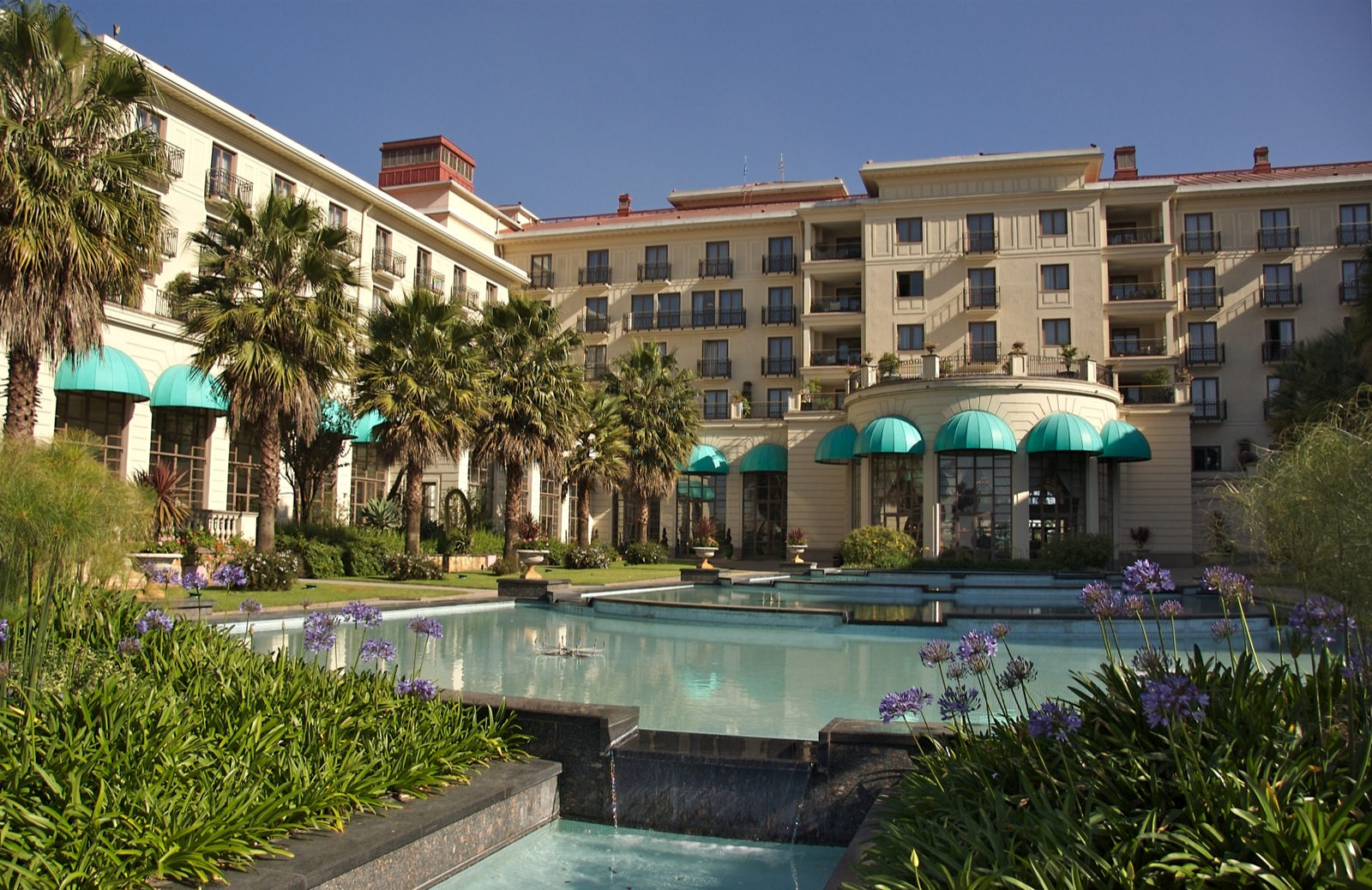
- The courtyard of the hotel and its pool
- Hotel chain: The Luxury Collection

General information
- Location: Addis Ababa, Ethiopia, Taitu Avenue, Arada district
- Opening: 28 February 1998
- Cost: US$200 million
- Owner: Mohammed Hussein Al Amoudi
- Operator: Jean-Pierre Manigoff

Technical details
- Floor count: 6
- Floor area: 85,000 m^{2}

Design and construction
- Architect: Kosek Ivo
- Developer: MIDROC Ethiopia

Other information
- Number of rooms: 293
- Number of suites: 33
- Number of restaurants: 6, Summerfields; Shaheen; Stagioni; Breezes; Fountain Court; Les Arcades
- Number of bars: 4, Baywatch; Stanley's; The Office; Gaslight Night Club

The Sheraton Addis is an international hotel located in Addis Ababa, Ethiopia. It is part of Marriott's Luxury Collection. It has 293 rooms, as well as a number of villas.

== Profile ==
The hotel was built by MIDROC Ethiopia, and designed by architect Kosek Ivo. Sheik Mohammed Hussein Al Amoudi, built the hotel as a way of creating jobs and promoting the country's image- saying that he is "investing in Ethiopia by following my heart, not my head". The hotel cost over $200 million to build, and over 500 families had to be relocated for its construction. It opened on 28 February 1998, and has been considered one of the country's leading hotels. The hotel is located between two palaces, the National Palace (formerly the Jubilee Palace), which is the residence of the President of Ethiopia, and the Menelik Palace, residence of the Prime Minister of Ethiopia.

The hotel has hosted countless high-profile events, including Pan-African and African Union summits, as well as New Year's Eve celebrations with special performances by world-renowned artists such as Beyonce, Ludacris, The Black Eyed Peas, Rihanna and Akon, among other guests.

The hotel has been host to a number of celebrities, including the aforementioned performers; indeed, most, if not all, choose to stay in the Sheraton when in Ethiopia, according to The Independent. Among the many guests include Tony Blair, Rita Marley, Princess Anne, Jimmy Carter, and Bill Clinton.

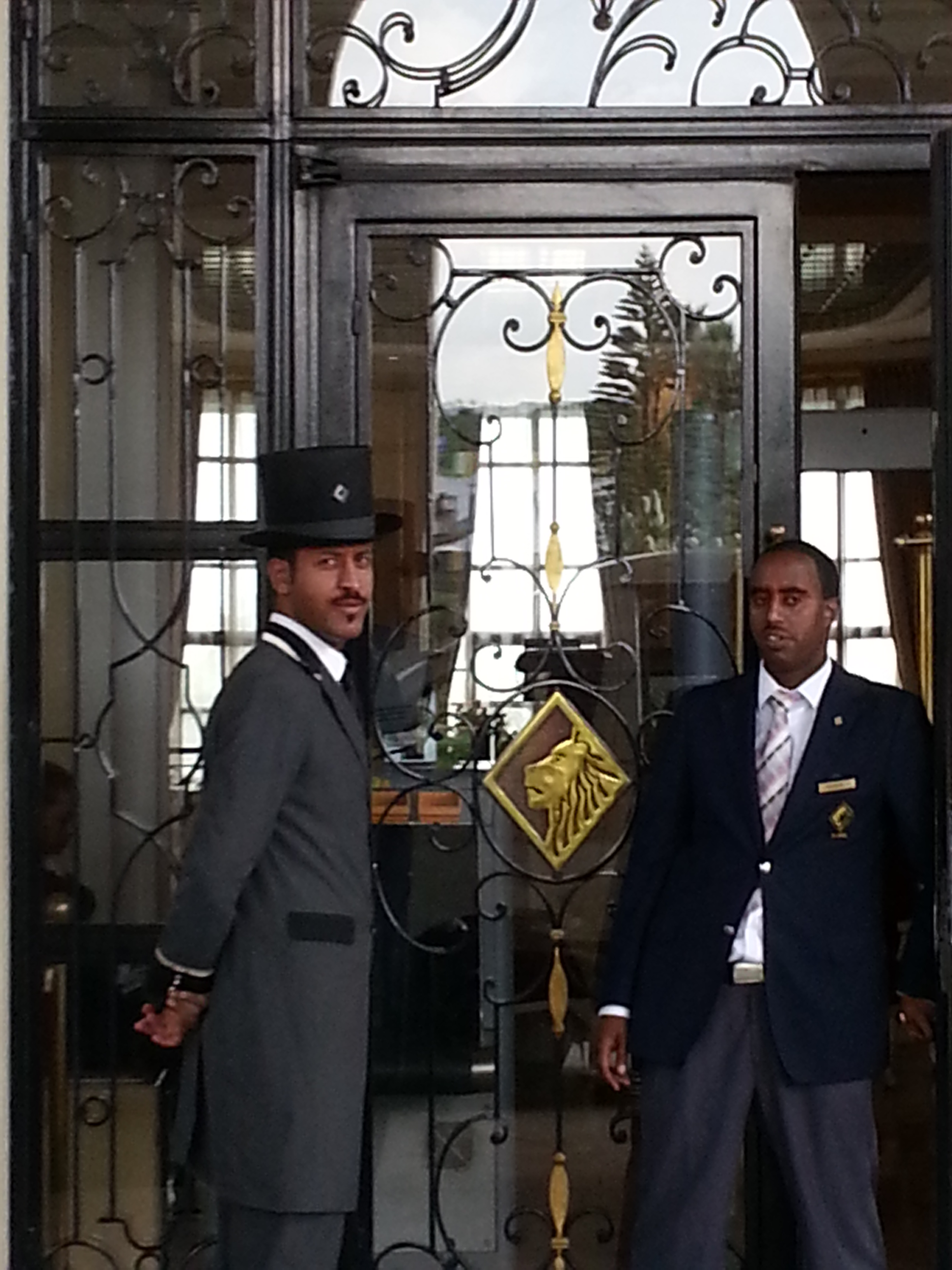
Doormen at the Sheraton Addis.

Confusingly, the Sheraton Addis is not a member of Sheraton Hotels and Resorts hotel chain, but The Luxury Collection, of which it has been a member since it was first opened. The Luxury Collection was originally created to designate the most luxurious properties of Sheraton, and Sheraton Addis is one of the three remaining Sheratons with this designation, alongside Sheraton Grande Sukhumvit in Bangkok and Sheraton Kuwait in Kuwait City. (Note: Other Sheratons with The Luxury Collection designation have since discarded the Sheraton name, like Sheraton Ankara (split into two hotels, one with the Sheraton brand and another retaining The Luxury Collection designation under the name Lugal) and Sheraton Lagoon Nusa Dua, Bali (now The Laguna, a Luxury Collection Resort & Spa, Nusa Dua, Bali).)

In 2018, following the acquisition of Starwood by Marriott International, the Reporter newspaper reported the hotel's name would be changed to the Marriott Addis. However, this was later denied by hotel management.

=== Labour dispute ===
In February 2011, a labour dispute over compensation threatened to close the hotel. In late 2010, a union was formed at the hotel, and in December got involved in a dispute of the distribution of profits from service charges. The workers, who were already the most well-paid hotel employees in the country, taking home 5,337 Ethiopian Birr (US$283) on average per month, felt that the sharing of the service charges was not sufficient. The union argued that management should be excluded from the proceeds which would increase salaries by 52 birr. Sheik Hussein said that he felt "unappreciated and unrecognised" for his "generosity to employees of the hotel", and threatened to close the hotel for expansion work. The crisis was solved before the 15 February deadline.

=== Expansion plans ===
42 hectares across two districts- Kirkos and Arada, was acquired by the hotel in 2004 for an expansion project, that would contain retail, a mosque, and 8050 apartments. The program was stalled, however, due to the city's inability to find funds to relocate the over 3,000 households that were to be displaced by the project. In 2010 MIDROC gave the municipality 151 million birr to expedite the process. As of 2013, the land has been cleared but construction has not begun.

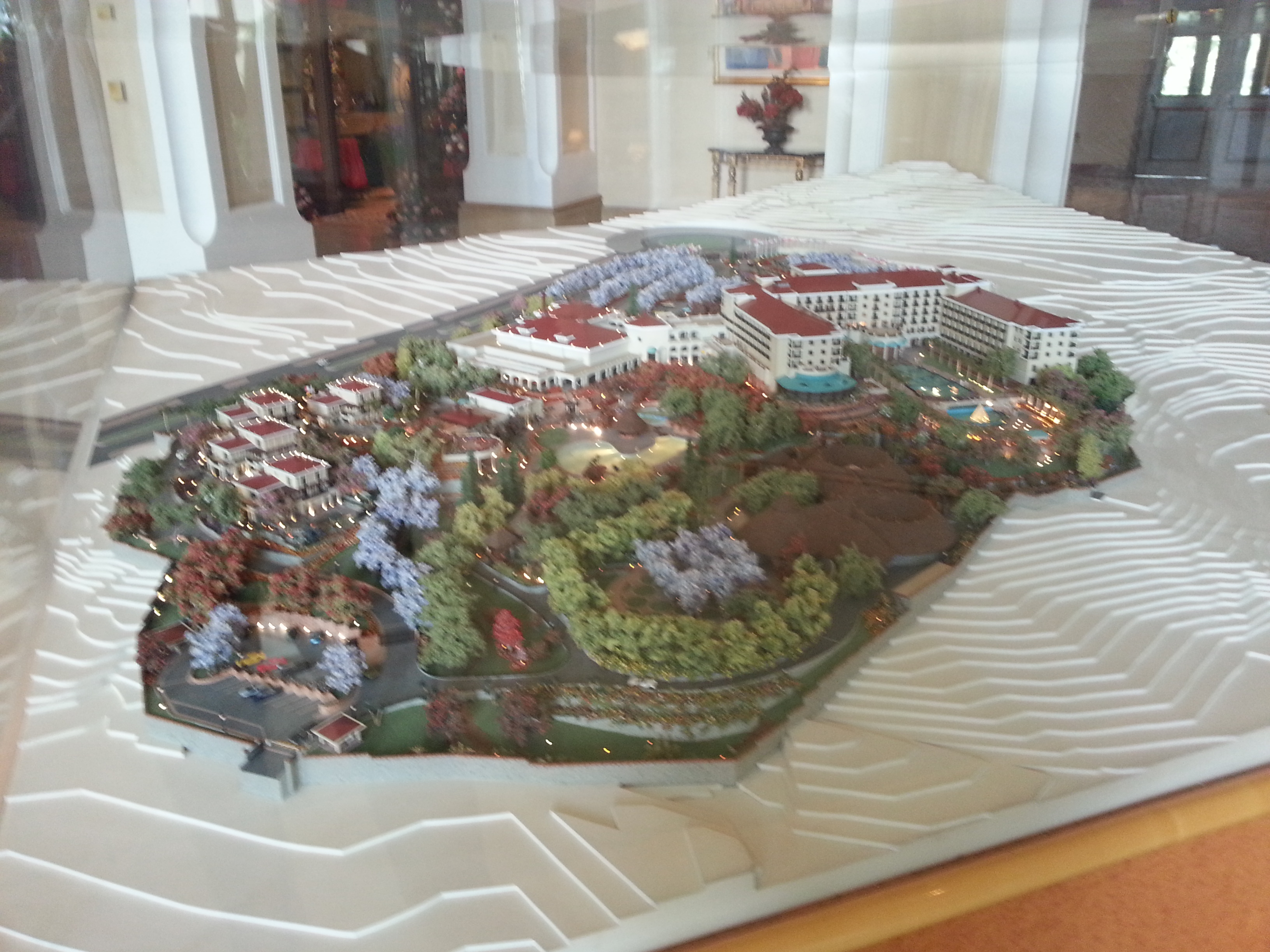
A model of the hotel compound.

An additional 5 hectares has been set aside for the construction of a new 9-story hotel wing of 25,000 m^{2} containing extended stay apartments. Also included are villas, bungalows, as well as a 31,400 m^{2} health centre, in response to guest complaints about the paucity of health facilities. The health center will contain Olympic and outdoor tennis courts, an olympic swimming pool, restaurants, a soccer pitches, and a basketball court. This project is projected to cost $127 million. As of 2013, construction has begun on the health centre.

== Features ==
The hotel has over 1,500 square meters of function space over 11 conference rooms, allowing for a capacity of 1,500 person at events. The hotel provides an array of dining options including Italian, French, Indian restaurants, as well as a poolside restaurant and all-day dining international restaurant with 5 bars and lounges.

The hotel's health club, the Aqva Club, includes outdoor swimming pools, sauna, massage and Jacuzzi. A special feature of the pool is its underwater music. Within the Aqva Club is also found the special Simba Club, the children's playground. However, the health club has been criticised in many reviews as having minimal facilities, leading to expansion plans.

The hotel has a nightclub, called The Gaslight. The Sheraton Addis is the only hotel in Ethiopia to have a water treatment plant using an ultra-violet water sterilization system, which ensures sterilization and bacteria free purification of water. It has a number of generators, meaning that the hotel is never affected by the power cuts and load shedding that plague Addis Ababa.
