= Alemseged Efrem =

Eritrean football coach

Personal information
- Date of birth: 19 November 1970 (age 56)
- Place of birth: Eritrea
- Position: Midfielder

International career
Years	Team	Apps	(Gls)
1994	Eritrea	1	(1)

Managerial career
- 2015–2020: Eritrea

Alemseged Efrem (born 19 November 1970) is an Eritrean football coach who was in charge of the Eritrea national football team as from 2015 to 2020.

== Eritrea ==
Despite being intransigent that his team were going to win opposing Botswana in a 2018 World Cup qualifying match, Efrem's side lost 2-0 and 3-1 to the Zebras;however, he and 10 players solicited political asylum in Botswana, claiming they were in danger by returning to their homeland but not elucidating why.

The Eritrean coach revealed that he was striving to select emerging young players and Eritrean expatriate footballers in Europe for the national roster in 2015.

=== Managerial record ===
As of match played 25 January 2020

Managerial record by team and tenure
Team	Nat	From	To	Record					Ref.
Team	Nat	From	To	G	W	D	L	Win %	Ref.
Eritrea		2015	2020	11	3	1	7	27.27	
Career Total				11	3	1	7	27.27	—
