= Bryan Meyo =

Gabonese footballer

Personal information
- Full name: Bryan Meyo Ngoua
- Date of birth: 31 January 2006 (age 20)
- Place of birth: Montpellier, France
- Position: Forward

Team information
- Current team: Torreense

Youth career
- 2013–2014: AS Valence
- 2014–2015: PS Romans
- 2015–2019: Olympique Valence
- 2019–2025: Lyon
- 2026–: Torreense

Senior career*
Years	Team	Apps	(Gls)
2025–2026	Lyon II	16	(0)
2026–	Torreense	0	(0)

International career^{‡}
2021	France U16	4	(0)
2025–	Gabon	4	(2)
- * Club domestic league appearances and goals as of 19:54, 2 August 2026 (UTC) ‡ National team caps and goals as of 19:15, 13 November 2025 (UTC)

Bryan Meyo Ngoua (born 31 January 2006) is a professional footballer who plays as a forward for Liga Portugal 2 club Torreense. Born in France, he plays for the Gabon national team.

== Club career ==
Meyo is a product of the youth academies of AS Valence, Persévérante Sportive Romanaise, Olympique Valence and Lyon. As a U19 with Lyon, he scored 14 goals and had 3 assists in 24 games as captain. On 14 July 2024, he signed a youth contract with Lyon for 2 years.

He joined Liga Portugal 2 club Torreense ahead of the 2026–27 season. He agreed to a deal valid until 2029, and will also feature for Torreense U23.

== International career ==
Born in France, Meyo is of Gabonese descent and holds dual French-Gabonese citizenship. In 2021, he made 4 friendly appearances for the France U16s. In May 2025, he was called up to the Gabon national team for a set of friendlies. He debuted with Gabon in a friendly 2–1 victory over Guinea Bissau, scoring a goal.

== Career statistics ==
=== Club ===
As of match played 11 April 2026

Appearances and goals by club, season and competition
Club	Season	League			National cup		Europe		Other		Total	
Club	Season	Division	Apps	Goals	Apps	Goals	Apps	Goals	Apps	Goals	Apps	Goals
Lyon B	2024–25	National 3	0	0	—		—		—		0	0
Lyon B	2025–26	National 3	16	0	—		—		—		16	0
Torreense	2026–27	Liga Portugal 2	0	0	0	0	0	0	0	0	0	0
Career total			16	0	0	0	0	0	0	0	16	0

=== International ===
As of match played 13 November 2025

Appearances and goals by national team and year
National team	Year	Apps	Goals
Gabon	2025	4	2
Total		4	2

Scores and results list Gabon's goal tally first, score column indicates score after each Meyo goal.

List of international goals scored by Bryan Meyo
No.	Date	Venue	Opponent	Score	Result	Competition
1	9 June 2025	Estádio 24 de Setembro, Bissau, Guinea-Bissau	Guinea-Bissau	2–0	2–0	Friendly
2	14 October 2025	Stade de Franceville, Franceville, Burundi	Burundi	1–0	2–0	2026 FIFA World Cup qualification
