= Ryan Ogam =

Kenyan footballer

Personal information
- Full name: Ryan Wesley Ogam
- Date of birth: 21 December 2004 (age 21)
- Place of birth: Nairobi, Kenya
- Height: 1.87 m (6 ft 2 in)
- Position: Striker

Team information
- Current team: Wolfsberger AC II (on loan from Wolfsberger AC)
- Number: 11

Youth career
- Galaxy FC
- Sunrise FC
- UEFA Despanol

Senior career*
Years	Team	Apps	(Gls)
2022–2023	Rainbow F.C.		(5)
2023	Elite Falcons (UAE)		
2024–2025	Tusker FC	17	(15)
2025–	Wolfsberger AC	1	(0)
2025–	→ Wolfsberger AC II (loan)	9	(4)

International career^{‡}
2025–	Kenya	19	(10)
- * Club domestic league appearances and goals as of 10 June 2026 ‡ National team caps and goals as of 13 November 2026

Ryan Wesley Ogam (born 21 December 2004) is a Kenyan professional footballer who plays for Austrian Regionalliga Central club Wolfsberger AC II on loan from Austrian Bundesliga club Wolfsberger AC and the Kenya national team.

== Club career ==
=== Early career ===
Born in Nairobi, Ogam attended Unity Primary, Kakamega High School (2019–2021), and Dagoretti High School (2022), where he competed in school football. He played initially as a left-back for local youth sides including Galaxy FC, Sunrise FC, and UEFA Despanol. He also featured in international youth competitions such as the Norway Cup (2017) and a tournament in Italy (2018).

He began his senior career with Rainbow FC in 2022 in the National Super League, scoring five goals for the club before moving to Elite Falcons (UAE) in 2023. He then moved to Tusker in the Kenyan top flight in 2024, scoring 15 goals in 17 games.

=== Wolfsberger AC ===
Ogam joined Austrian Bundesliga club Wolfsberger AC on 1 September 2025. He made his debut as a second-half substitute during the 3–1 victory against Grazer AK on 4 October 2025.

==== Wolfsberger AC II (loan) ====
He was loaned out to Austrian Regionalliga Central club Wolfsberger AC II in November 2025 and debuted during the 3–1 loss against ASK Voitsberg on 9 November 2025. He scored two goals during the 3–0 victory against USV St. Anna am Aigen on 28 February 2026.

== International career ==
He was called up to the Kenya national team in January 2025 for the inaugural Mapinduzi Cup. He made a scoring debut for Kenya during the competition on 7 January 2025 during the 2–0 victory against Tanzania as he earned his maiden cap.

He scored two goals during the 2024 African Nations Championship to hand Kenya identical group stage 1–0 wins over eventual champions Morocco, and Zambia, leading Kenya to the quarter-final stage for the first time in their history.

He added three more goals in back-to-back 2026 FIFA World Cup qualification ties played at the Moi International Sports Center, Nairobi; the consolation in a 3–1 defeat to Gambia on 5 September 2025, and a brace - his first in national team colors - as Kenya hammered Seychelles 5–0 to improve his haul to six in his first nine international games.

== Career statistics ==
=== International ===
As of match played 30 March 2026.

Appearances and goals by national team and year
National team	Year	Apps	Goals
Kenya	2025	14	7
Kenya	2026	2	2
Total		16	9

Scores and results list Kenya's goal tally first, score column indicates score after each Ogam goal.

List of international goals scored by Ryan Ogam
No.	Date	Venue	Cap	Opponent	Score	Result	Competition
1.	7 January 2025	Gombani Stadium, Zanzibar, Tanzania	1	Tanzania	2–0	2–0	2025 Mapinduzi Cup
2.	10 August 2025	Moi International Sports Center, Nairobi, Kenya	5	Morocco	1–0	1–0	2024 African Nations Championship
3.	17 August 2025	Moi International Sports Center, Nairobi, Kenya	6	Zambia	1–0	1–0	2024 African Nations Championship
4.	5 September 2025	Moi International Sports Center, Nairobi, Kenya	8	Gambia	1–3	1–3	2026 FIFA World Cup qualification
5.	9 September 2025	Moi International Sports Center, Nairobi, Kenya	9	Seychelles	1–0	5–0	2026 FIFA World Cup qualification
6.	9 September 2025	Moi International Sports Center, Nairobi, Kenya	9	Seychelles	3–0	5–0	2026 FIFA World Cup qualification
7.	9 October 2025	Intwari Stadium, Bujumbura, Burundi	10	Burundi	1–0	1–0	2026 FIFA World Cup qualification
8.	27 March 2026	Amahoro Stadium, Kigali, Rwanda	15	Estonia	1–1	1–1 (4–5 p)	2026 FIFA Series
9.	30 March 2026	Amahoro Stadium, Kigali, Rwanda	16	Grenada	2–0	3–0	2026 FIFA Series
10.	13 November 2026	Orlando Stadium, Johannesburg, South Africa	19	South Africa	2–2	2–2	2027 Africa Cup of Nations qualification
