= Rooney Onyango =

Kenyan footballer

Rooney Onyango is a Kenyan defender and winger currently in the ranks of Kenyan Premier League side Gor Mahia FC, and the Kenya national football team.

== Career ==
He previously turned out for Gusii United and Wazito FC.

He was the skipper of Kenya's Olympic football team in June 2024.

He made his Kenya national team debut in Oct 2023 in Mardan Titanic Sports Complex in Antalya, Turkey during an international friendly against Russia.

== Career statistics ==
=== International ===
As of match played 7 June 2026

Appearances and goals by national team and year
National team	Year	Apps	Goals
Kenya	2023	3	1
Kenya	2024	15	0
Kenya	2025	9	0
Kenya	2026	4	0
Total		31	1

Scores and results list Kenya's goal tally first, score column indicates score after each Onyango goal.

List of international goals scored by Rooney Onyango
No.	Date	Venue	Opponent	Score	Result	Competition
1	20 November 2023	Felix Houphouet Boigny Stadium, Abidjan, Ivory Coast	Seychelles	4–0	5–0	2026 FIFA World Cup qualification
