= Tekie Abraha =

Eritrean professional football manager

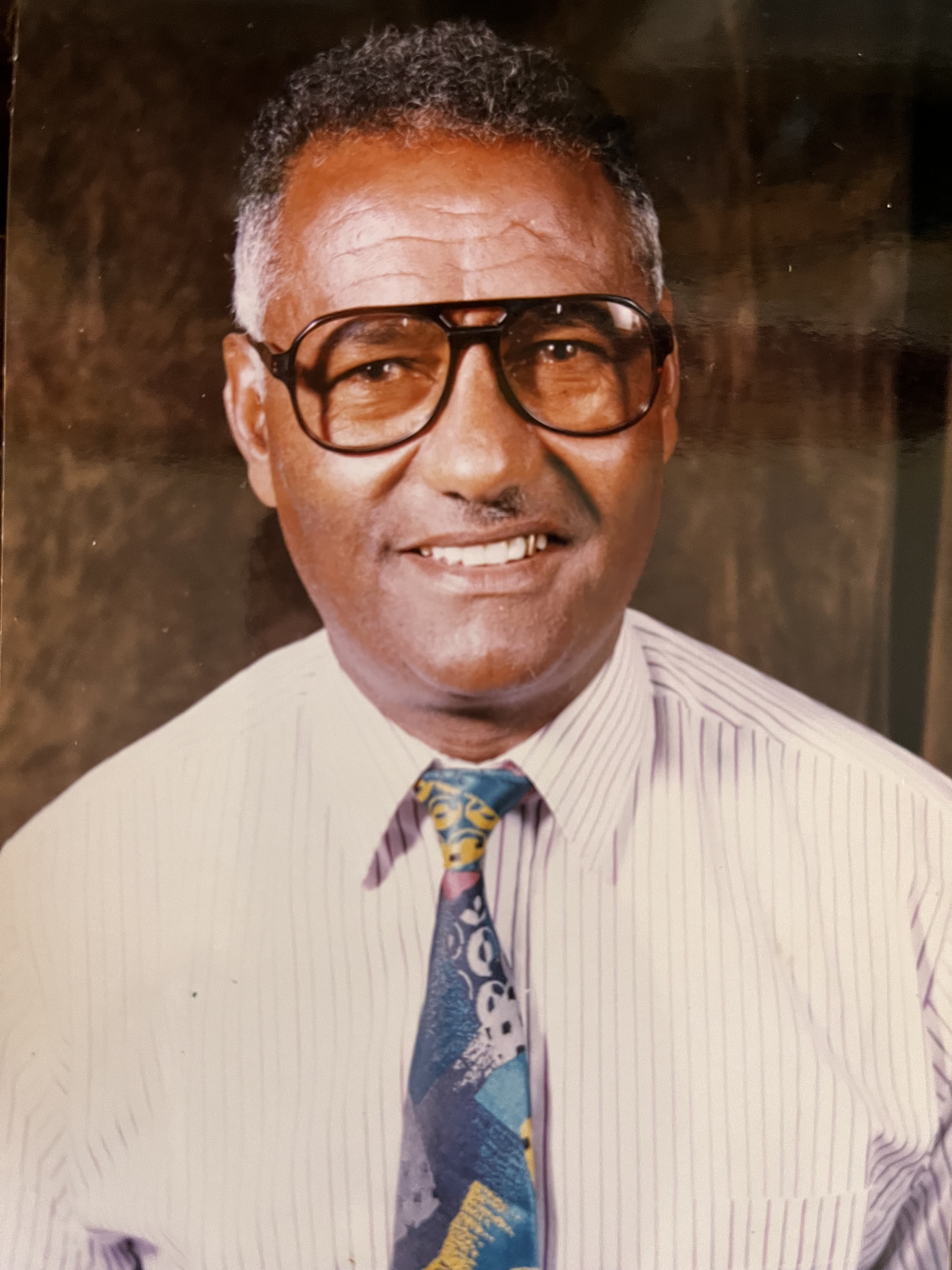

Personal information
- Place of birth: Asmara, Eritrea

Team information
- Current team: Vacant

Managerial career
- Years: Team
- 1992–1996: Eritrea
- 1999–2000: Eritrea
- 2003: Eritrea

Tekie Abraha is an Eritrean professional football manager.

== Career ==
Since 1992 to 1994, 2001 to 2003 he coached the Eritrea national football team.
