= Berhane Aregai =

Eritrean footballer

Personal information
- Full name: Berhane Aregai
- Position: Midfielder

Senior career*
Years	Team	Apps	(Gls)
2007–2008	APR		

International career
2002–2007	Eritrea	11	(5)
- * Club domestic league appearances and goals

Berhane Aregai is an Eritrean former footballer who played as a midfielder for the Eritrea national team.

== Career statistics ==
=== International ===
Scores and results list Eritrea's goal tally first, score column indicates score after each Eritrea goal.

List of international goals scored by Berhane Aregai
No.	Date	Venue	Opponent	Score	Result	Competition	Ref.
1	6 December 2002	CCM Kirumba Stadium, Mwanza, Tanzania	Kenya	1–2	1–4	2002 CECAFA Cup	
2	16 June 2007	Cicero Stadium, Asmara, Eritrea	Kenya	1–0	1–0	2008 Africa Cup of Nations qualification	
3	9 December 2007	National Stadium, Dar es Salaam, Tanzania	Rwanda	1–1	1–2	2007 CECAFA Cup	
4	11 December 2007	National Stadium, Dar es Salaam, Tanzania	Djibouti	1–0	3–2	2007 CECAFA Cup	
5	17 December 2007	National Stadium, Dar es Salaam, Tanzania	Uganda	1–0	1–2	2007 CECAFA Cup	
