= Negash Teklit =

Eritrean footballer and manager

Personal information
- Full name: Negash Teklit Negassi
- Date of birth: 12 April 1966 (age 60)
- Place of birth: Eritrea

International career
Years	Team	Apps	(Gls)
1987–1988	Ethiopia	3	(0)

Managerial career
- 2002: Eritrea (caretaker)
- 2003–?: Eritrea (assistant)
- 2009–2013: Eritrea
- Eritrea U20

Negash Teklit (Tigrinya: ነጋሽ ተኽሊት; born 12 April 1966) is an Eritrean professional football player and manager.

== Playing career ==
In the 1980s Teklit played for the Ethiopia national team, representing his national team during the 1987 and 1988 editions of the CECAFA Cup.

He won the 1987 CECAFA Cup with the Ethiopia national team.

== Managerial career ==
In April 2002 Teklit coached the Eritrea national team at the 1st Africa Military Games (CISM) in Nairobi. Later, he worked in the staff of representation.

Since 2009 until December 2012 he was a head coach of the Eritrea national team.

He led Eritrea U20 to the end in CECAFA U-20 Championship in 2010, but lost the final to the Uganda U20.

== Honours ==
Ethiopia

- CECAFA Cup: 1987
