= Amos Wanjala =

Kenyan footballer

Personal information
- Full name: Amos Emmanuel Wanjala
- Date of birth: 28 March 2006 (age 20)
- Place of birth: Mombasa, Kenya
- Position: Centre-back

Team information
- Current team: Valencia B
- Number: 17

Youth career
- Solidarity Boys
- 2023–2024: Gimnàstic

Senior career*
Years	Team	Apps	(Gls)
2023	Nastic Sports Academy B	1	(0)
2023–2024	Nastic Sports Academy	9	(0)
2024–2026	Athletic Torrellano	37	(0)
2026–	Valencia B	14	(0)

International career^{‡}
2025–	Kenya U20	2	(0)
2026–	Kenya	1	(0)
- * Club domestic league appearances and goals as of 24 May 2026 ‡ National team caps and goals as of 26 September 2026

Amos Wanjala (born 28 March 2006) is a Kenyan professional footballer who plays as a defender for Valencia Mestalla and for the Kenya national team.

== Club career ==
Wanjala began his career in Kenya before moving to Spain to pursue his professional career. In January 2026, Amos Wanjala, signed for Spanish club Valencia CF, joining the club's reserve side, VCF Mestalla on a two-year contract after transferring from Athletic Club Torrellano.

== International career ==
Wanjala has represented Kenya at both the U-18 and U-20 levels. He captained the Kenya U20 national team during the 2024 CECAFA U-20 Championship and at the 2025 U-20 Africa Cup of Nations in Cairo.

On a few occasions he has been called up to the senior Kenya national team, Harambee Stars.
