= Refugee Consortium of Kenya =

Kenyan non-governmental organization

- Location within Kenya
- Formation: 1998
- Legal status: NGO
- Headquarters: Haki House, Ndemi Road, Off Muringa Road Kilimani, Nairobi.
- Coordinates: 1°17′43″S 36°46′31″E
- Executive Director: Barlet Colly Jaji
- Website: https://www.rckkenya.org/

The Refugee Consortium of Kenya (RCK) is a Non-Governmental Organization established in the year 2000 with a mission to protect and promote the well-being, voice and dignity of the displaced and host population through its strategic programmatic pillars of legal aid and governance; peace and social justice; women and girls’ empowerment; and mental health and psychosocial support. To achieve this, RCK has invested in delivery pathways with wide-range strategic approaches including advocacy and thought leadership; innovation and learning; capacity building and support; partnerships and localization; and strategic communication to attain its overall organizational goal. RCK’s reach is transboundary but with physical offices located at Kakuma, Dadaab, Garissa, Nairobi, Mombasa and Mwingi.

== Focus area ==
Since its establishment, the organization's goals have adapted to remain relevant to displaced individuals and host communities. Over the years, RCK has advocated for government, partner, and donor investments in transforming social attitudes and norms, policies, laws, and public opinion, all aimed at safeguarding and promoting the well-being, voices, and dignity of both displaced individuals and host communities. RCK’s mission is to advocate for and safeguard the rights and dignity of refugees, asylum seekers, internally displaced persons (IDPs), and other forced migrants in Kenya and the wider East African region. The organization operates based on five core pillars, namely legal aid and governance, peace and social justice, empowerment of women and girls, mental health and psychosocial support, and organizational development.

== Geographical reach ==
The Refugee Consortium of Kenya has offices in North, Kenya and its work encompasses the broader context of the refugee situation in Kenya and the region, the Great Lakes, and the Horn of Africa Region. Additionally, the operational information from Kakuma, a significant refugee camp in Kenya, highlights the collaboration between Refugee Affairs and RCK which shows that RCK's influence extends to areas with a significant refugee presence, contributing to the protection and well-being of refugees in Kenya.

== Awards ==
RCK was granted the best Civil Society Organization Award by the Law Society of Kenya for two consecutive years, 2023 and 2024. In 2022, RCK was awarded as the first runner-up for Civil Society Organization of the Year by the Law Society of Kenya, Nairobi branch, showcasing their impact and efforts. In 2021, the Law Society of Kenya's Nairobi branch awarded RCK for the 1st runner-up position in the category of Public Sector Legal Department of the Year. This prestigious accolade is bestowed based on merit, following a comprehensive evaluation and assessment process. It serves as recognition of RCK's exceptional standards of practice and delivery of legal services.

== See also ==
- Law Society of Kenya
- Kenya Human Rights Commission
- Kenya National Commission on Human Rights
- The Youth Cafe
