= Alemseged Assefa =

Ethiopian banker

Alemseged Assefa is the Vice Governor at The National Bank of Ethiopia (NBE). He attempted to replace the one Birr notes with one Birr coins. As of 2020, Assefa is the former Vice Governor.
