= Ghana national football team results (2020–present) =

This article provides details of international football games played by the Ghana national football team from 2020 to present.

== Results ==
Key
| Win |
| Draw |
| Defeat |

=== 2020 ===
| 9 October Friendly | Mali | 3–0 | Ghana | Side, Turkey |
| 20:00 UTC+3 | H. Traoré 3'; E. Touré 49'; Haidara 75' | Report | | Stadium: Emirhan Sport Center Stadium; Referee: Halil Meler (Turkey) |

| 12 October Friendly | Ghana | 5–1 | Qatar | Aksu, Turkey |
| 18:30 UTC+3 | Fosu 22'; A. Ayew 63', 83'; Owusu 65'; Ekuban 87' | Report | Ali 44' | Stadium: Mardan Sports Complex; Referee: Hüseyin Göçek (Turkey) |

| 12 November 2021 AFCON qualification | Ghana | 2–0 | Sudan | Cape Coast, Ghana |
| 16:00 UTC+0 | A. Ayew 19', 81' | Report | | Stadium: Cape Coast Sports Stadium; Referee: Maguette N'Diaye (Senegal) |

| 17 November 2021 AFCON qualification | Sudan | 1–0 | Ghana | Omdurman, Sudan |
| 15:00 UTC+2 | Abdel Rahman 90+2' | Report | | Stadium: Al-Hilal Stadium; Referee: Joshua Bondo (Botswana) |

=== 2021 ===
| 25 March 2021 AFCON qualification | South Africa | 1–1 | Ghana | Johannesburg, South Africa |
| 18:00 UTC+2 | Tau 51' | Report | Kudus 49' | Stadium: FNB Stadium; Referee: Bamlak Tessema Weyesa (Ethiopia) |

| 28 March 2021 AFCON qualification | Ghana | 3–1 | São Tomé and Príncipe | Cape Coast, Ghana |
| 16:00 UTC+0 | Opoku 12'; J. Ayew 31' (pen.); Rahman 60' | Report | Iniesta 83' | Stadium: Cape Coast Sports Stadium; Referee: Souleiman Ahmed Djama (Djibouti) |

| 8 June Friendly | Morocco | 1–0 | Ghana | Rabat, Morocco |
| 20:00 UTC+1 | El Yamiq 69' | Report | | Stadium: Prince Moulay Abdellah Stadium; Referee: Adalbert Diouf (Senegal) |

| 12 June Friendly | Ghana | 0–0 | Ivory Coast | Cape Coast, Ghana |
| 17:00 UTC+0 | | Report | | Stadium: Cape Coast Sports Stadium; Referee: Daouda Guèye (Senegal) |

| 3 September 2022 World Cup qualification | Ghana | 1–0 | Ethiopia | Cape Coast, Ghana |
| 19:00 UTC+0 | Wakaso 35' | Report | | Stadium: Cape Coast Sports Stadium; Referee: Redouane Jiyed (Morocco) |

| 6 September 2022 World Cup qualification | South Africa | 1–0 | Ghana | Johannesburg, South Africa |
| 18:00 UTC+2 | Hlongwane 83' | Report | | Stadium: FNB Stadium; Referee: Derrick Kasokota Kafuli (Zambia) |

| 9 October 2022 World Cup qualification | Ghana | 3–1 | Zimbabwe | Cape Coast, Ghana |
| 16:00 UTC+0 | Kudus 5'; Partey 66'; A. Ayew 87' | Report | Musona 49' (pen.) | Stadium: Cape Coast Sports Stadium; Referee: Pierre Atcho (Gabon) |

| 12 October 2022 World Cup qualification | Zimbabwe | 0–1 | Ghana | Harare, Zimbabwe |
| 15:00 UTC+2 | | Report | Partey 31' | Stadium: National Sports Stadium; Attendance: 0 Referee: Amin Omar (Egypt) |

| 11 November 2022 World Cup qualification | Ethiopia | 1–1 | Ghana | Johannesburg, South Africa |
| 15:00 UTC+2 | Kebede 72' | Report | A. Ayew 22' | Stadium: Orlando Stadium; Referee: Blaise Yuven Ngwa (Cameroon) |

| 14 November 2022 World Cup qualification | Ghana | 1–0 | South Africa | Cape Coast, Ghana |
| 21:00 UTC+0 | A. Ayew 33' (pen.) | Report | | Stadium: Cape Coast Sports Stadium; Referee: Maguette N'Diaye (Senegal) |

=== 2022 ===
| 5 January Friendly | Algeria | 3–0 | Ghana | Al Rayyan, Qatar |
| 19:00 UTC+3 | Ounas 8'; J. Mensah 74' (o.g.); Slimani 79' | Report | | Stadium: Education City Stadium; Referee: Saoud Ali Al-Adba (Qatar) |

| 10 January 2021 AFCON GS | Morocco | 1–0 | Ghana | Yaoundé, Cameroon |
| 17:00 UTC+1 | Boufal 83' | Report | | Stadium: Stade Ahmadou Ahidjo; Referee: Joshua Bondo (Botswana) |

| 14 January 2021 AFCON GS | Gabon | 1–1 | Ghana | Yaoundé, Cameroon |
| 20:00 UTC+1 | Allevinah 88' | Report | A. Ayew 18' | Stadium: Stade Ahmadou Ahidjo; Referee: Lahlou Benbraham (Algeria) |

| 18 January 2021 AFCON GS | Ghana | 2–3 | Comoros | Garoua, Cameroon |
| 20:00 UTC+1 | Boakye 64'; Djiku 77' | Report | Ben Nabouhane 4'; Mogni 61', 85' | Stadium: Roumdé Adjia Stadium; Referee: Boubou Traore (Mali) |

| 25 March 2022 World Cup qualification | Ghana | 0–0 | Nigeria | Kumasi, Ghana |
| 19:30 UTC+0 | | Report | | Stadium: Baba Yara Stadium; Referee: Redouane Jiyed (Morocco) |

| 29 March 2022 World Cup qualification | Nigeria | 1–1 (1–1 (a) agg.) | Ghana | Abuja, Nigeria |
| 18:00 UTC+1 | Troost-Ekong 22' (pen.) | Report | Partey 10' | Stadium: Moshood Abiola National Stadium; Referee: Sadok Selmi (Tunisia) |

| 1 June 2023 AFCON qualification | Ghana | 3–0 | Madagascar | Cape Coast, Ghana |
| 19:00 UTC+0 | Kudus 53'; Afena-Gyan 56'; Bukari 86' | Report | | Stadium: Cape Coast Sports Stadium; Referee: Mahamadou Kéïta (Mali) |

| 5 June 2023 AFCON qualification | Central African Republic | 1–1 | Ghana | Luanda, Angola |
| 14:00 UTC+1 | Namnganda 41' | Report | Kudus 17' | Stadium: Estádio 11 de Novembro; Referee: Pierre Atcho (Gabon) |

| 10 June 2022 Kirin Cup Soccer | Japan | 4–1 | Ghana | Kobe, Japan |
| 18:55 UTC+9 | Yamane 29'; Mitoma 45+1'; Kubo 73'; Maeda 82' | Report | J. Ayew 43' | Stadium: Noevir Stadium Kobe; Attendance: 25,100; Referee: Ams Kurt (Australia) |

| 14 June 2022 Kirin Cup Soccer | Ghana | 0–0 (3–1 p) | Chile | Osaka, Japan |
| 15:15 UTC+9 | | Report | | Stadium: Panasonic Stadium Suita; Attendance: 6,185; Referee: Hiroki Kasahara (Japan) |
| | Penalties |
| | J. Ayew (penalty scored); Kudus (penalty scored); Issahaku (penalty scored) | | (penalty scored) Fernández; (penalty missed) Alarcón; (penalty missed) Brereton; (penalty missed) Medel |

| 23 September Friendly | Brazil | 3–0 | Ghana | Le Havre, France |
| 20:30 UTC+2 | Marquinhos 9'; Richarlison 28', 40' | Report | | Stadium: Stade Océane; Referee: Mikael Lesage (France) |

| 27 September Friendly | Nicaragua | 0–1 | Ghana | Lorca, Spain |
| 20:00 UTC+2 | | Report | Issahaku 35' | Stadium: Estadio Francisco Artes Carrasco; Referee: Dario Bel (Croatia) |

| 17 November Friendly | Ghana | 2–0 | Switzerland | Abu Dhabi, United Arab Emirates |
| 14:00 UTC+4 | Salisu 70'; Semenyo 74' | Report | | Stadium: Zayed Sports City Stadium; Referee: Ahmed Eisa Darwish (United Arab Emirates) |

| 24 November 2022 World Cup GS | Portugal | 3–2 | Ghana | Doha, Qatar |
| 19:00 UTC+3 | Ronaldo 65' (pen.); Félix 78'; Leão 80' | Report | A. Ayew 73'; Bukari 89' | Stadium: Stadium 974; Attendance: 42,662; Referee: Ismail Elfath (United States) |

| 28 November 2022 World Cup GS | South Korea | 2–3 | Ghana | Al Rayyan, Qatar |
| 16:00 UTC+3 | Cho Gue-sung 58', 61' | Report | Salisu 24'; Kudus 34', 68' | Stadium: Education City Stadium; Attendance: 43,983; Referee: Anthony Taylor (England) |

| 2 December 2022 World Cup GS | Ghana | 0–2 | Uruguay | Al Wakrah, Qatar |
| 18:00 UTC+3 | | Report | De Arrascaeta 26', 32' | Stadium: Al Janoub Stadium; Attendance: 43,443; Referee: Daniel Siebert (Germany) |

=== 2023 ===
| 23 March 2023 AFCON qualification | Ghana | 1–0 | Angola | Kumasi, Ghana |
| 17:00 UTC+0 | Semenyo 90+6' | Report | | Stadium: Baba Yara Stadium; Referee: Jean Jacques Ndala Ngambo (DR Congo) |

| 27 March 2023 AFCON qualification | Angola | 1–1 | Ghana | Luanda, Angola |
| 17:00 UTC+1 | João 51' (pen.) | Report | Bukari 72' | Stadium: Estádio 11 de Novembro; Referee: Mohamed Maarouf (Egypt) |

| 18 June 2023 AFCON qualification | Madagascar | 0–0 | Ghana | Antananarivo, Madagascar |
| 17:00 UTC+3 | | Report | | Stadium: Mahamasina Municipal Stadium; Referee: Patrice Milazar (Mauritius) |

| 7 September 2023 AFCON qualification | Ghana | 2–1 | Central African Republic | Kumasi, Ghana |
| 16:00 UTC+0 | Kudus 43'; Nuamah 88' | Report | Mafouta 25' | Stadium: Baba Yara Stadium; Referee: Peter Waweru (Kenya) |

| 12 September Friendly | Ghana | 3–1 | Liberia | Accra, Ghana |
| 16:00 UTC+0 | Nuamah 52'; Kudus 59'; J. Ayew 82' | Report | Teah 90+1' | Stadium: Accra Sports Stadium; Referee: Kouassi Attiogbe (Togo) |

| 14 October Friendly | Mexico | 2–0 | Ghana | Charlotte, United States |
| 21:00 UTC−4 | Lozano 57'; Antuna 72' | Report | | Stadium: Bank of America Stadium; Referee: Joe Dickerson (United States) |

| 17 October Friendly | United States | 4–0 | Ghana | Nashville, United States |
| 19:30 UTC−5 | Reyna 10', 39'; Pulisic 19' (pen.); Balogun 22' | Report | | Stadium: Geodis Park; Referee: Marco Ortiz (Mexico) |

| 17 November 2026 World Cup qualification | Ghana | 1–0 | Madagascar | Kumasi, Ghana |
| 16:00 UTC+0 | Williams 90+6' | Report | | Stadium: Baba Yara Stadium; Attendance: 45,000; Referee: Samir Guezzaz (Morocco) |

| 21 November 2026 World Cup qualification | Comoros | 1–0 | Ghana | Moroni, Comoros |
| 19:00 UTC+3 | Maolida 43' | Report | | Stadium: Stade de Moroni; Attendance: 11,628; Referee: Abdel Aziz Mohamed Bouh (Mauritania) |

=== 2024 ===
| 8 January Friendly | Ghana | 0–0 | Namibia | Kumasi, Ghana |
| 20:00 UTC+0 | | Report | | Stadium: Baba Yara Stadium; Referee: Charles Bulu (Ghana) |

| 14 January 2023 Africa Cup of Nations GS | Ghana | 1–2 | Cape Verde | Abidjan, Ivory Coast |
| 20:00 UTC+0 | Djiku 56' | Report | Monteiro 17'; Rodrigues 90+2' | Stadium: Felix Houphouet Boigny Stadium; Attendance: 11,943; Referee: Jean-Jacques Ndala Ngambo (DR Congo) |

| 18 January 2023 Africa Cup of Nations GS | Egypt | 2–2 | Ghana | Abidjan, Ivory Coast |
| 20:00 UTC+0 | Marmoush 69'; Mostafa 74' | Report | Kudus 45+3', 71' | Stadium: Felix Houphouet Boigny Stadium; Attendance: 20,808; Referee: Pierre Atcho (Gabon) |

| 22 January 2023 Africa Cup of Nations GS | Mozambique | 2–2 | Ghana | Abidjan, Ivory Coast |
| 20:00 UTC+0 | Catamo 90+1' (pen.); Mandava 90+4' | Report | J. Ayew 15' (pen.), 70' (pen.) | Stadium: Alassane Ouattara Stadium; Attendance: 6,000; Referee: Mutaz Ibrahim (Libya) |

| 22 March Friendly | Nigeria | 2–1 | Ghana | Marrakesh, Morocco |
| 16:00 UTC+0 | Dessers 38' (pen.); Lookman 84' | Report | J. Ayew 90+5' (pen.) | Stadium: Marrakesh Stadium; Referee: Rédouane Jiyed (Morocco) |

| 26 March Friendly | Uganda | 2–2 | Ghana | Marrakesh, Morocco |
| 16:00 UTC+0 | Mukwala 23' (pen.); Shaban 82' | Report | Opoku 7'; J. Ayew 28' (pen.) | Stadium: Marrakesh Stadium; Referee: Bouchra Kaboubi (Morocco) |

| 6 June 2026 World Cup qualification | Mali | 1–2 | Ghana | Bamako, Mali |
| 19:00 UTC+0 | K. Doumbia 45+1' | Report | Nuamah 58'; J. Ayew 90+4' | Stadium: Stade du 26 Mars; Attendance: 50,200; Referee: Amin Omar (Egypt) |

| 10 June 2026 World Cup qualification | Ghana | 4–3 | Central African Republic | Kumasi, Ghana |
| 19:00 UTC+0 | J. Ayew 6' (pen.), 60', 69'; Fatawu 62' | Report | Mafouta 11', 41', 90' | Stadium: Baba Yara Stadium; Attendance: 39,000; Referee: Abdulrazg Ahmed (Libya) |

| 5 September 2025 AFCON qualification | Ghana | 0–1 | Angola | Kumasi, Ghana |
| 16:00 UTC+0 | | Report | Milson 90+3' | Stadium: Baba Yara Stadium; Referee: Samuel Uwikunda (Rwanda) |

| 9 September 2025 AFCON qualification | Niger | 1–1 | Ghana | Berkane, Morocco |
| 16:00 UTC+1 | Sako 81' | Report | Seidu 44' | Stadium: Berkane Municipal Stadium; Referee: Lamin Jammeh (Gambia) |

| 10 October 2025 AFCON qualification | Ghana | 0–0 | Sudan | Accra, Ghana |
| 16:00 UTC+0 | | Report | | Stadium: Accra Sports Stadium; Referee: Patrice Milazar (Mauritius) |

| 15 October 2025 AFCON qualification | Sudan | 2–0 | Ghana | Benghazi, Libya |
| 15:00 UTC+2 | Al-Tash 62'; Abdelrahman 65' | Report | | Stadium: Martyrs of February Stadium; Referee: Mehrez Malki (Tunisia) |

| 15 November 2025 AFCON qualification | Angola | 1–1 | Ghana | Talatona, Angola |
| 19:00 UTC+1 | Zini 64' | Report | J. Ayew 18' | Stadium: Estádio 11 de Novembro; Referee: Georges Gatogato (Burundi) |

| 18 November 2025 AFCON qualification | Ghana | 1–2 | Niger | Accra, Ghana |
| 13:00 UTC+0 | Afriyie 67' | Report | Badamassi 22'; Sako 90+2' | Stadium: Accra Sports Stadium; Referee: Rulisa Patience Fidele (Central African Republic) |

| 22 December 2024 CHAN qualification | Ghana | 0–0 | Nigeria | Accra, Ghana |
| 16:00 UTC+0 | | Report | | Stadium: Accra Sports Stadium; Referee: Aklesso Gnama (Togo) |

| 28 December 2024 CHAN qualification | Nigeria | 3–1 | Ghana | Uyo, Nigeria |
| 17:00 UTC+1 | Sodiq 19'; Junior 22'; Saviour 25' | Report | Amankuna 73' | Stadium: Godswill Akpabio International Stadium; Referee: Hamza El Fareq (Morocco) |

=== 2025 ===
| 21 March 2026 World Cup qualification | Ghana | 5–0 | Chad | Accra, Ghana |
| 19:00 UTC+0 | Semenyo 2'; Williams 31'; J. Ayew 36' (pen.); Salisu 56'; Nuamah 68' | Report | | Stadium: Accra Sports Stadium; Referee: Ahmed Abdulrazg (Libya) |

| 24 March 2026 World Cup qualification | Madagascar | 0–3 | Ghana | Al Hoceima, Morocco |
| 20:00 UTC+1 | | Report | Partey 11', 53'; Kudus 58' | Stadium: Grand Stade d'Al Hoceima; Referee: Issa Sy (Senegal) |

| 28 May 2025 Unity Cup | Nigeria | 2–1 | Ghana | London, England |
| 19:45 UTC+1 | Dessers 14'; Simpson 19' (o.g.) | Report | Thomas-Asante 70' | Stadium: Gtech Community Stadium; Referee: Stuart Attwell (England) |

| 31 May 2025 Unity Cup | Trinidad and Tobago | 0–4 | Ghana | London, England |
| 12:30 UTC+1 | | Report | J. Ayew 6'; Simpson 12'; Fuseini 41'; Agyekum 58' | Stadium: Gtech Community Stadium; Referee: Sam Barrott (England) |

| 4 September 2026 World Cup qualification | Chad | 1–1 | Ghana | N'Djamena, Chad |
| 14:00 UTC+1 | Ecua 89' | Report | J. Ayew 17' | Stadium: Stade Olympique Maréchal Idriss Déby Itno; Referee: Celso Alvação (Mozambique) |

| 8 September 2026 World Cup qualification | Ghana | 1–0 | Mali | Accra, Ghana |
| 19:00 UTC+0 | Djiku 49' | Report | | Stadium: Accra Sports Stadium; Referee: Luxolo Badi (South Africa) |

| 8 October 2026 World Cup qualification | Central African Republic | 0–5 | Ghana | El Jadida, Morocco |
| 17:00 UTC+1 | | Report | Salisu 20'; Partey 52'; Djiku 69'; J. Ayew 71'; Sulemana 87' | Stadium: Ben M'Hamed El Abdi Stadium; Attendance: 200; Referee: Patrice Milazar (Mauritius) |

| 12 October 2026 World Cup qualification | Ghana | 1–0 | Comoros | Accra, Ghana |
| 19:00 UTC+0 | Kudus 47' | Report | | Stadium: Accra Sports Stadium; Referee: Pierre Atcho (Gabon) |

| 14 November 2025 Kirin Challenge Cup | Japan | 2–0 | Ghana | Toyota, Japan |
| 19:20 UTC+9 | Minamino 16'; Dōan 60' | Report | | Stadium: Toyota Stadium; Attendance: 40,030; Referee: Ben Abraham (Australia) |

| 18 November Friendly | South Korea | 1–0 | Ghana | Seoul, South Korea |
| 20:00 UTC+9 | Lee Tae-seok 63' | Report | | Stadium: Seoul World Cup Stadium; Attendance: 33,256; Referee: Ahmad Al-Ali (Kuwait) |

=== 2026 ===
| 27 March Friendly | Austria | 5–1 | Ghana | Vienna, Austria |
| 19:00 UTC+1 | Sabitzer 12' (pen.); Gregoritsch 51'; Posch 59'; Chukwumeka 79'; Seiwald 90+2' | Report | J. Ayew 77' | Stadium: Ernst-Happel-Stadion; Attendance: 40,200; Referee: Mohammed Al Hoish (Saudi Arabia) |

| 30 March Friendly | Germany | 2–1 | Ghana | Stuttgart, Germany |
| 20:45 UTC+2 | Havertz 45+3' (pen.); Undav 88' | Report | Fatawu 70' | Stadium: MHPArena; Attendance: 52,723; Referee: Stuart Attwell (England) |

| 22 May Friendly | Mexico | 2–0 | Ghana | Puebla, Mexico |
| 20:00 UTC−6 | Gutiérrez 2'; Martínez 54' | Report | | Stadium: Estadio Cuauhtémoc; Attendance: 41,235; Referee: Selvin Brown (Honduras) |

| 2 June Friendly | Wales | 1–1 | Ghana | Cardiff, Wales |
| 19:45 UTC+0 | Koumas 90+3' | Report | Yirenkyi 66' | Stadium: Cardiff City Stadium; Attendance: 11,806; Referee: Oscar Johnson (Sweden) |

| 17 June 2026 World Cup GS | Ghana | 1–0 | Panama | Toronto, Canada |
| 19:00 UTC−4 | Yirenkyi 90+5' | Report | | Stadium: BMO Field; Attendance: 42,942; Referee: Glenn Nyberg (Sweden) |

| 23 June 2026 World Cup GS | England | 0–0 | Ghana | Foxborough, United States |
| 16:00 UTC−4 | | Report | | Stadium: Gillette Stadium; Attendance: 63,983; Referee: Saíd Martínez (Honduras) |

| 27 June 2026 World Cup GS | Croatia | 2–1 | Ghana | Philadelphia, United States |
| 17:00 UTC−4 | P. Sučić 31'; Vlašić 83' | Report | Luckassen 73' | Stadium: Lincoln Financial Field; Attendance: 68,324; Referee: Drew Fischer (Canada) |

| 4 July 2026 World Cup R32 | Colombia | 1–0 | Ghana | Kansas City, United States |
| 20:30 UTC−5 | J. Arias 14' | Report | | Stadium: Kansas City Stadium; Attendance: 69,045; Referee: Clément Turpin (France) |

| 24 September 2027 AFCON qualification | Ivory Coast | 2–0 | Ghana | Bouaké, Ivory Coast |
| 19:00 UTC+0 | Yalcouyé 44'; Kessié 58' (pen.) | Report | | Stadium: Bouaké Stadium; Referee: Mustapha Ghorbal (Algeria) |

| 29 September 2027 AFCON qualification | Ghana | 2–4 | Gambia | Accra, Ghana |
| 16:00 UTC+0 | Nuamah 27' (pen.); Afena-Gyan 33' | Report | Badamosi 37' (pen.); O. Colley 42'; E. Colley 68', 90+1' | Stadium: Accra Sports Stadium; Referee: Mustapha Kechchaf (Morocco) |

| 4 October Friendly | Morocco | Cancelled | Ghana | Tangier, Morocco |
| 19:00 UTC+0 | | Report | | Stadium: Grand Stade de Tanger |
Note: The decision was made on 1 October to cancel the match, following consultation between both national federations.

| 12 November 2027 AFCON qualification | Ghana | 2–0 | Somalia | Essipong, Ghana |
| 15:00 UTC+0 | Adjetey 45+2'; Afena-Gyan 62' | Report | | Stadium: Sekondi-Takoradi Stadium; Referee: André Kolissala (Central African Republic) |

| 16 November 2027 AFCON qualification | Somalia | 0–1 | Ghana | Essipong, Ghana |
| 15:00 UTC+0 | | Report | J. Ayew 36' (pen.) | Stadium: Sekondi-Takoradi Stadium; Referee: Mweshitsama Naftal (Namibia) |

=== 2027 ===
| 24 March 2027 AFCON qualification | Ghana | v | Ivory Coast | Ghana |
| --:-- UTC+0 | | | | Stadium: TBC |

| 28 March 2027 AFCON qualification | Gambia | v | Ghana | Gambia |
| --:-- UTC+0 | | | | Stadium: TBC |
