= 2021 Africa Cup of Nations Group C =

Football tournament group stage

Group C of the 2021 Africa Cup of Nations took place from 10 to 18 January 2022. The group consisted of debutants Comoros, Gabon, Ghana and Morocco.

Morocco and Gabon as the top two teams, along with Comoros as one of the four best third-placed teams, advanced to the round of 16.

== Teams ==
Draw position	Team	Zone	Method of qualification	Date of qualification	Finals appearance	Last appearance	Previous best performance	FIFA Rankings	
Draw position	Team	Zone	Method of qualification	Date of qualification	Finals appearance	Last appearance	Previous best performance	May 2021 (Note: The rankings of May 2021 were used for seeding for the final draw.)	December 2021
C1	Morocco	UNAF	Group E winners	26 March 2021	18th	2019	Winners (1976)	34	28
C2	Ghana	WAFU	Group C winners	25 March 2021	23rd	2019	Winners (1963, 1965, 1978, 1982)	49	52
C3	Gabon	UNIFFAC	Group D runners-up	25 March 2021	8th	2017	Quarter-finals (1996, 2012)	88	89
C4	Comoros	COSAFA	Group G runners-up	25 March 2021	1st	None	Debut	131	132

== Standings ==
Pos	Team	Pld	W	D	L	GF	GA	GD	Pts	Qualification
1	Morocco	3	2	1	0	5	2	+3	7	Advance to knockout stage
2	Gabon	3	1	2	0	4	3	+1	5	Advance to knockout stage
3	Comoros	3	1	0	2	3	5	−2	3	Advance to knockout stage
4	Ghana	3	0	1	2	3	5	−2	1	

Source: CAF
Rules for classification: Group stage tiebreakers

== Matches ==
=== Morocco vs Ghana ===
10 January 2022
17:00

Morocco	1–0	Ghana
Boufal 83'	Report

Ahmadou Ahidjo Stadium, Yaoundé
Referee: Joshua Bondo (Botswana)

Morocco	Ghana

GK	1	Yassine Bounou
RB	2	Achraf Hakimi
CB	6	Romain Saïss (c)
CB	5	Nayef Aguerd
LB	3	Adam Masina	(yellow card) 22'
DM	24	Samy Mmaee
RM	8	Azzedine Ounahi		(substituted off) 90'
AM	15	Selim Amallah
AM	7	Imran Louza		(substituted off) 78'
LM	17	Sofiane Boufal
CF	14	Zakaria Aboukhlal		(substituted off) 90'
Substitutions:
FW	28	Tarik Tissoudali		(substituted on) 78'
FW	27	Soufiane Rahimi		(substituted on) 90'
MF	4	Sofyan Amrabat		(substituted on) 90'
Manager:
(Bosnia and Herzegovina) Vahid Halilhodžić

GK	16	Joe Wollacott
RB	2	Andy Yiadom
CB	18	Daniel Amartey
CB	23	Alexander Djiku	(yellow card) 17'
LB	17	Baba Rahman
CM	5	Thomas Partey		(substituted off) 90+1'
CM	21	Iddrisu Baba
RW	15	Joseph Paintsil		(substituted off) 86'
AM	10	André Ayew (c)	(yellow card) 64'
LW	22	Kamaldeen Sulemana		(substituted off) 86'
CF	9	Jordan Ayew		(substituted off) 86'
Substitutions:
FW	7	Abdul Fatawu		(substituted on) 86'
FW	25	Benjamin Tetteh		(substituted on) 86'
MF	8	Daniel-Kofi Kyereh		(substituted on) 86'
FW	13	Richmond Boakye		(substituted on) 90+1'
Manager:
(Serbia) Milovan Rajevac

Man of the Match:
Sofiane Boufal (Morocco)

Assistant referees:
Khalil Hassani (Tunisia)
Souru Phatsoane (Lesotho)
Fourth official:
Dahane Beida (Mauritania)
Video assistant referee:
Haythem Guirat (Tunisia)
Assistant video assistant referee:
Mahmoud Ahmed Abouelregal (Egypt)

=== Comoros vs Gabon ===
10 January 2022
20:00

Comoros	0–1	Gabon
	Report	Boupendza 16'

Ahmadou Ahidjo Stadium, Yaoundé
Referee: Peter Waweru (Kenya)

Comoros	Gabon

GK	23	Ali Ahamada
CB	2	Kassim Abdallah	(yellow card) 45'	(substituted off) 46'
CB	4	Younn Zahary
CB	12	Kassim M'Dahoma		(substituted off) 77'
RM	26	Iyad Mohamed		(substituted off) 46'
CM	13	Rafidine Abdullah		(substituted off) 77'
CM	19	Mohamed Youssouf		(substituted off) 67'
LM	22	Saïd Bakari
AM	10	Youssouf M'Changama
CF	15	Benjaloud Youssouf
CF	21	El Fardou Ben Nabouhane (c)
Substitutions:
MF	8	Fouad Bachirou		(substituted on) 46'
FW	24	Faiz Mattoir		(substituted on) 46'
FW	25	Moussa Djoumoi		(substituted on) 67'
FW	20	Ahmed Mogni		(substituted on) 77'
DF	6	Jimmy Abdou		(substituted on) 77'
Manager:
(France) Amir Abdou

GK	1	Jean-Noël Amonome
RB	4	Sidney Obissa
CB	8	Lloyd Palun
CB	5	Bruno Ecuele Manga (c)
LB	6	Johann Obiang
CM	12	Guélor Kanga
CM	17	André Biyogo Poko	(yellow card) 61'
RW	14	Louis Ameka		(substituted off) 58'
AM	7	Aaron Boupendza		(substituted off) 79'
LW	20	Denis Bouanga
CF	11	Jim Allevinah		(substituted off) 66'
Substitutions:
MF	19	Serge-Junior Martinsson Ngouali		(substituted on) 58'
FW	15	Ulrick Eneme Ella		(substituted on) 66'
DF	24	David Sambissa		(substituted on) 79'
Manager:
(France) Patrice Neveu

Man of the Match:
Aaron Boupendza (Gabon)

Assistant referees:
Gilbert Cheruiyot (Kenya)
Frank Komba (Tanzania)
Fourth official:
Amin Omar (Egypt)
Video assistant referee:
Mahmoud Mohamed Ashour (Egypt)
Assistant video assistant referee:
Mahmoud Ahmed Abouelregal (Egypt)

=== Morocco vs Comoros ===
14 January 2022
17:00

Morocco	2–0	Comoros
Amallah 16'; Aboukhlal 88'	Report

Ahmadou Ahidjo Stadium, Yaoundé
Referee: Sadok Selmi (Tunisia)

Morocco	Comoros

GK	1	Yassine Bounou
RB	2	Achraf Hakimi	(yellow card) 42'
CB	6	Romain Saïss (c)
CB	5	Nayef Aguerd
LB	3	Adam Masina
DM	4	Sofyan Amrabat
RM	28	Tarik Tissoudali		(substituted off) 65'
AM	15	Selim Amallah	(yellow card) 41'	(substituted off) 90'
AM	7	Imran Louza		(substituted off) 65'
LM	17	Sofiane Boufal		(substituted off) 76'
CF	9	Ayoub El Kaabi		(substituted off) 65'
Substitutions:
MF	11	Fayçal Fajr		(substituted on) 65'
FW	19	Youssef En-Nesyri		(substituted on) 65'
FW	14	Zakaria Aboukhlal		(substituted on) 65'
FW	10	Munir El Haddadi		(substituted on) 76'
MF	8	Azzedine Ounahi		(substituted on) 90'
Manager:
(Bosnia and Herzegovina) Vahid Halilhodžić

GK	1	Salim Ben Boina
RB	19	Mohamed Youssouf		(substituted off) 89'
CB	12	Kassim M'Dahoma
CB	6	Jimmy Abdou (c)
LB	15	Benjaloud Youssouf		(substituted off) 65'
DM	13	Rafidine Abdullah		(substituted off) 59'
RM	22	Saïd Bakari		(substituted off) 90'
AM	10	Youssouf M'Changama	(yellow card) 18'
AM	8	Fouad Bachirou		(substituted off) 90'
LM	7	Faïz Selemani	(yellow card) 16'
CF	21	El Fardou Ben Nabouhane
Substitutions:
MF	18	Yacine Bourhane		(substituted on) 59'
DF	4	Younn Zahary		(substituted on) 65'
FW	25	Moussa Djoumoi		(substituted on) 89'
FW	17	Ibroihim Djoudja		(substituted on) 90'
FW	20	Ahmed Mogni		(substituted on) 90'
Manager:
(France) Amir Abdou

Man of the Match:
Salim Ben Boina (Comoros)

Assistant referees:
Khalil Hassani (Tunisia)
Liban Abdourazak Ahmed (Djibouti)
Fourth official:
Peter Waweru (Kenya)
Video assistant referee:
Haythem Guirat (Tunisia)
Assistant video assistant referee:
Mahmoud El Banna (Egypt)

=== Gabon vs Ghana ===
14 January 2022
20:00

Gabon	1–1	Ghana
Allevinah 88'	Report	A. Ayew 18'

Ahmadou Ahidjo Stadium, Yaoundé
Referee: Lahlou Benbraham (Algeria)

Gabon	Ghana

GK	1	Jean-Noël Amonome
CB	3	Anthony Oyono	(yellow card) 57'
CB	5	Bruno Ecuele Manga (c)	(yellow card) 24'
CB	25	Junior Assoumou
RM	14	Louis Ameka		(substituted off) 76'
CM	17	André Biyogo Poko
CM	19	Serge-Junior Martinsson Ngouali		(substituted off) 67'
LM	6	Johann Obiang
AM	12	Guélor Kanga	(yellow card) 45'
CF	7	Aaron Boupendza
CF	20	Denis Bouanga		(substituted off) 53'
Substitutions:
FW	11	Jim Allevinah		(substituted on) 53'
FW	15	Ulrick Eneme Ella		(substituted on) 67'
DF	2	Alex Moucketou-Moussounda		(substituted on) 76'
Manager:
(France) Patrice Neveu

GK	16	Joe Wollacott	(yellow card) 81'
RB	2	Andy Yiadom
CB	18	Daniel Amartey
CB	23	Alexander Djiku
LB	17	Baba Rahman
CM	5	Thomas Partey	(yellow card) 36'
CM	21	Iddrisu Baba		(substituted off) 65'
CM	8	Daniel-Kofi Kyereh	(yellow card) 59'
RW	9	Jordan Ayew		(substituted off) 90+2'
LW	22	Kamaldeen Sulemana		(substituted off) 61'
CF	10	André Ayew (c)		(substituted off) 90+2'
Substitutions:
MF	6	Edmund Addo		(substituted on) 61'
MF	15	Joseph Paintsil	(yellow card) 90+4'	(substituted on) 65'
FW	25	Benjamin Tetteh	(red card) 90+4'	(substituted on) 90+2'
FW	7	Abdul Fatawu		(substituted on) 90+2'
Manager:
(Serbia) Milovan Rajevac

Man of the Match:
André Ayew (Ghana)

Assistant referees:
Mohammed Abdallah Ibrahim (Sudan)
Seydou Tiama (Burkina Faso)
Fourth official:
Amin Omar (Egypt)
Video assistant referee:
Mehdi Abid Charef (Algeria)
Assistant video assistant referee:
Mahmoud Ahmed Abouelregal (Egypt)

=== Gabon vs Morocco ===
18 January 2022
20:00

Gabon	2–2	Morocco
Allevinah 21'; Aguerd 81' (o.g.)	Report	Boufal 74' (pen.); Hakimi 84'

Ahmadou Ahidjo Stadium, Yaoundé
Referee: Dahane Beida (Mauritania)

Gabon	Morocco

GK	1	Jean-Noël Amonome
CB	8	Lloyd Palun
CB	5	Bruno Ecuele Manga (c)
CB	25	Junior Assoumou
RM	3	Anthony Oyono
CM	2	Alex Moucketou-Moussounda		(substituted off) 64'
CM	17	André Biyogo Poko
LM	6	Johann Obiang	(yellow card) 36'
AM	12	Guélor Kanga
CF	11	Jim Allevinah		(substituted off) 88'
CF	7	Aaron Boupendza	(yellow card) 45+1'	(substituted off) 90+1'
Substitutions:
FW	14	Louis Ameka		(substituted on) 64'
FW	13	Kévin Mayi		(substituted on) 88'
FW	10	Axel Méyé		(substituted on) 90+1'
Manager:
(France) Patrice Neveu

GK	12	Munir Mohamedi
RB	2	Achraf Hakimi
CB	18	Sofian Chakla		(substituted off) 89'
CB	5	Nayef Aguerd
LB	3	Adam Masina
RM	8	Azzedine Ounahi		(substituted off) 89'
CM	13	Ilias Chair		(substituted off) 31'
CM	4	Sofyan Amrabat	(yellow card) 38'
LM	11	Fayçal Fajr (c)		(substituted off) 57'
CF	9	Ayoub El Kaabi		(substituted off) 57'
CF	19	Youssef En-Nesyri
Substitutions:
MF	15	Selim Amallah		(substituted on) 31'
FW	17	Sofiane Boufal		(substituted on) 57'
MF	16	Aymen Barkok		(substituted on) 57'
FW	28	Tarik Tissoudali		(substituted on) 89'
DF	6	Romain Saïss		(substituted on) 89'
Manager:
(Bosnia and Herzegovina) Vahid Halilhodžić

Man of the Match:
Jim Allevinah (Gabon)

Assistant referees:
Attia Amsaaed (Libya)
Frank Komba (Tanzania)
Fourth official:
Maguette N'Diaye (Senegal)
Video assistant referee:
Janny Sikazwe (Zambia)
Assistant video assistant referee:
Khalil Hassani (Tunisia)

=== Ghana vs Comoros ===
18 January 2022
20:00

Ghana	2–3	Comoros
Boakye 64'; Djiku 77'	Report	Ben Nabouhane 4'; Mogni 62', 85'

Roumdé Adjia Stadium, Garoua
Referee: Boubou Traore (Mali)

Ghana	Comoros

GK	16	Joe Wollacott
RB	2	Andy Yiadom	(yellow card) 78'	(substituted off) 81'
CB	18	Daniel Amartey
CB	23	Alexander Djiku
LB	17	Baba Rahman		(substituted off) 46'
RM	22	Kamaldeen Sulemana		(substituted off) 60'
CM	5	Thomas Partey
CM	8	Daniel-Kofi Kyereh
LM	7	Abdul Fatawu		(substituted off) 60'
SS	10	André Ayew (c)	(red card) 25'
CF	9	Jordan Ayew
Substitutions:
MF	6	Edmund Addo		(substituted on) 46'
FW	13	Richmond Boakye		(substituted on) 60'
MF	15	Joseph Paintsil		(substituted on) 60'
FW	19	Samuel Owusu		(substituted on) 81'
Manager:
(Serbia) Milovan Rajevac

GK	1	Salim Ben Boina		(substituted off) 26'
RB	15	Benjaloud Youssouf		(substituted off) 90'
CB	4	Younn Zahary
CB	12	Kassim M'Dahoma
LB	22	Saïd Bakari
RM	7	Faïz Selemani	(yellow card) 14'
CM	10	Youssouf M'Changama
CM	8	Fouad Bachirou		(substituted off) 90'
LM	20	Ahmed Mogni		(substituted off) 90'
CF	17	Ibroihim Djoudja		(substituted off) 60'
CF	21	El Fardou Ben Nabouhane
Substitutions:
GK	23	Ali Ahamada		(substituted on) 26'
FW	24	Faiz Mattoir		(substituted on) 60'
MF	13	Rafidine Abdullah		(substituted on) 90'
DF	19	Mohamed Youssouf		(substituted on) 90'
DF	6	Jimmy Abdou		(substituted on) 90'
Manager:
(France) Amir Abdou

Man of the Match:
Ben Nabouhane (Comoros)

Assistant referees:
Mahamadou Yahaya (Niger)
Issa Yaya (Chad)
Fourth official:
Issa Sy (Senegal)
Video assistant referee:
Mustapha Ghorbal (Algeria)
Assistant video assistant referee:
Abdelhak Etchiali (Algeria)
