= Sudan national football team results (2020–present) =

This article provides details of international football games played by the Sudan national football team from 2020 to present.

== Results ==
Key
Win
Draw
Defeat

=== 2020 ===
25 January 2020 Friendly	Eritrea	0–1	Sudan	Asmara, Eritrea
15:00 UTC+3		Report		Stadium: Cicero Stadium; Attendance: 0

9 October 2020 Friendly	Tunisia	2–5	Sudan	Radès, Tunisia
18:00 UTC+1	Khaoui 17'; Maâloul 25'; Ben Slimane 35'; Abdel rahman; 95'	Report		Stadium: Stade Olympique de Radès; Attendance: 0 Referee: Ibrahim Nour El Din (Egypt)

12 October 2020 Friendly	Togo	1–1	Sudan	Tunis, Tunisia
15:00 UTC+1	Sunu 70'	Report	Abdel Rahman 93'	Stadium: Stade El Menzah; Attendance: 0

12 November 2020 2021 AFCONQ	Ghana	2–0	Sudan	Cape Coast, Ghana
16:00 UTC+0	A. Ayew 19', 81'	Report		Stadium: Cape Coast Sports Stadium; Referee: Maguette N'Diaye (Senegal)

17 November 2020 2021 AFCONQ	Sudan	1–0	Ghana	Omdurman, Sudan
15:00 UTC+2	Abdel Rahman 90+2'	Report		Stadium: Al-Hilal Stadium; Referee: Joshua Bondo (Botswana)

=== 2021 ===
24 March 2021 2021 AFCONQ	São Tomé and Príncipe	0–2	Sudan	São Tomé, São Tomé and Príncipe
15:00 UTC+0		Report	Abdel Rahman 27'; Bakhit 55'	Stadium: Estádio Nacional 12 de Julho; Referee: Samuel Pwadutakam (Nigeria)

28 March 2021 2021 AFCONQ	Sudan	2–0	South Africa	Omdurman, Sudan
18:00 UTC+2	Bakhit 5'; Abdel Rahman 32'	Report		Stadium: Al-Hilal Stadium; Referee: Helder Martins de Carvalho (Angola)

13 June 2021 Friendly	Sudan	0–1	Zambia	Omdurman, Sudan
19:00 UTC+2		Report	Shamende 87'	Stadium: Al-Hilal Stadium; Referee: Samoal Mohamed El Fatih (Sudan)

19 June 2021 2021 FIFA Arab Cup	Libya	0–1	Sudan	Doha, Qatar
20:00 UTC+3		Report	Abdel Rahman 15' (pen.)	Stadium: Khalifa International Stadium; Referee: Saoud Ali Al-Adba (Qatar)

2 September 2021 2022 World Cup qualification	Morocco	2–0	Sudan	Rabat, Morocco
20:00 UTC+1	Aguerd 10'; Ahmed 53' (o.g.)	Report		Stadium: Prince Moulay Abdellah Stadium; Referee: Maguette N'Diaye (Senegal)

7 September 2021 2022 World Cup qualification	Sudan	2–4	Guinea-Bissau	Omdurman, Sudan
21:00 UTC+2	Abdel Rahman 55', 90+2'	Report	Piqueti 8', 39'; F. Mendy 11'; Mam. Baldé 82'	Stadium: Al-Hilal Stadium; Referee: Victor Gomes (South Africa)

6 October 2021 2022 World Cup qualification	Sudan	1–1	Guinea	Marrakesh, Morocco
17:00 UTC+1	Teiri 72'	Report	Bayo 56'	Stadium: Marrakesh Stadium; Referee: Janny Sikazwe (Zambia)

9 October 2021 2022 World Cup qualification	Guinea	2–2	Sudan	Agadir, Morocco
14:00 UTC+1	J. Kanté 48'; Bayo 67'	Report	Al-Tash 64'; Kamal 88'	Stadium: Stade Adrar; Referee: Mustapha Ghorbal (Algeria)

12 November 2021 2022 World Cup qualification	Sudan	0–3	Morocco	Rabat, Morocco
20:00 UTC+1		Report	Mmaee 3', 63'; Louza 90+3'	Stadium: Prince Moulay Abdellah Stadium; Referee: Peter Waweru (Kenya)

15 November 2021 2022 World Cup qualification	Guinea-Bissau	0–0	Sudan	Marrakesh, Morocco
17:00 UTC+1		Report		Stadium: Marrakesh Stadium; Referee: Jean Ouattara (Burkina Faso)

1 December 2021 2021 FIFA Arab Cup	Algeria	4–0	Sudan	Al Rayyan, Qatar
13:00 UTC+3	Bounedjah 11', 37'; Benlamri 43'; Soudani 46'	Report		Stadium: Ahmed bin Ali Stadium; Referee: Ryuji Sato (Japan)

4 December 2021 2021 FIFA Arab Cup	Sudan	0–5	Egypt	Doha, Qatar
19:00 UTC+3		Report	Refaat 4'; Sayed 13' (pen.); Hamdy 31'; Faisal 57'; Sherif 80'	Stadium: Stadium 974; Referee: Matthew Conger (New Zealand)

7 December 2021 2021 FIFA Arab Cup	Lebanon	1–0	Sudan	Al Rayyan, Qatar
22:00 UTC+3	Abu Eshrein 76' (o.g.)	Report		Stadium: Education City Stadium; Referee: Fernando Hernández Gómez (Mexico)

30 December 2021 Friendly	Sudan	2–3	Ethiopia	Cameroon

=== 2022 ===
2 January 2022 Friendly	Zimbabwe	0–0	Sudan	Yaoundé, Cameroon
16:00 UTC+1				Stadium: Rain Forest International Stadium

11 January 2022 2021 AFCON	Sudan	0–0	Guinea-Bissau	Garoua, Cameroon
20:00 UTC+1		Report		Stadium: Roumdé Adjia Stadium; Referee: Issa Sy (Senegal)

15 January 2022 2021 AFCON	Nigeria	3–1	Sudan	Garoua, Cameroon
17:00 UTC+1	Chukwueze 3'; Awoniyi 45'; Simon 46'	Report	Khedr 70' (pen.)	Stadium: Roumdé Adjia Stadium; Referee: Victor Gomes (South Africa)

19 January 2022 2021 AFCON	Egypt	1–0	Sudan	Yaoundé, Cameroon
20:00 UTC+1	Abdelmonem 35'	Report		Stadium: Stade Ahmadou Ahidjo; Referee: Joshua Bondo (Botswana)

26 March 2022 Friendly	Central African Republic	0–0	Sudan	Dar es Salaam, Tanzania
15:00 UTC+3		Report		Stadium: Benjamin Mkapa National Stadium

29 March 2022 Friendly	Tanzania	1–1	Sudan	Dar es Salaam, Tanzania
--:-- UTC+3				Stadium: Benjamin Mkapa National Stadium

4 June 2022 2023 AFCON Q	Mauritania	3–0	Sudan	Nouakchott, Mauritania
19:00 UTC+0	Kamara 27' (pen.), 30'; Mahmoud 77'	Report		Stadium: Stade Cheikha Ould Boïdiya; Referee: Fabricio Duarte (Cape Verde)

8 June 2022 2023 AFCON Q	Sudan	2–1	DR Congo	Omdurman, Sudan
21:00 UTC+2	Bakhet 16'; Abdelrahman 86'	Report	Bolingi 90+3'	Stadium: Al Hilal Stadium; Referee: Joshua Bondo (Botswana)

26 August 2022 2022 African Nations Championship Q	Djibouti	1–4	Sudan	Djibouti
	Hassan		Alsamani; Muhamed; Yaser

2 September 2022 2022 African Nations Championship Q	Sudan	3–2	Djibouti	Sudan
	Al-Shoala 3'; Alsamani 32'; Al-Teket 42'		Akinbinu (XX); Mahabeh (XX)

23 September 2022 Unofficial Friendly	Ethiopia	1–1	Sudan	Addis Ababa, Ethiopia
	Bekele 31'	Report	Omer 63'	Stadium: Abebe Bikila Stadium

26 September 2022 Friendly	Ethiopia	2–2	Sudan	Addis Ababa, Ethiopia
16:00 UTC+3	Hutessa 19'; Gugsa 41'	Report	El Shoaleh 21'; Abdelrahman 77'	Stadium: Abebe Bikila Stadium; Referee: Hassan Mohamed Hagi (Somalia)

=== 2023 ===
23 March 2023 AFCON qualification	Gabon	1–0	Sudan	Franceville, Gabon
20:00 UTC+1	Palun 71'	Report		Stadium: Stade de Franceville; Referee: Haythem Guirat (Tunisia)

27 March 2023 Africa Cup of Nations qualification	Sudan	1–0	Gabon	Omdurman, Sudan
18:00 UTC+2	Kome 67'	Report		Stadium: Al Hilal Stadium; Referee: Lotfi Bekouassa (Algeria)

15 June Friendly	Kuwait	1–4	Sudan	Cairo, Egypt

20 June 2023 Africa Cup of Nations qualification	Sudan	0–3	Mauritania	Agadir, Morocco
18:00 UTC+0		Report	El Abd 26'; Houbeib 49'; Tanjy 55'	Stadium: Adrar Stadium; Referee: Ibrahim Mutaz (Libya)

9 September 2023 Africa Cup of Nations qualification	DR Congo	2–0	Sudan	Kinshasa, DR Congo
17:00 UTC+1	Bongonda 8'; Mayele 87'	Report		Stadium: Stade des Martyrs; Referee: Samir Guezzaz (Morocco)

15 October Friendly	Sudan	1–1	Tanzania	Taif, Saudi Arabia
19:00 UTC+3	Musab	Report	Bajana	Stadium: King Fahd Sports City

17 October Friendly	Sudan	1–0	Chad	Taif, Saudi Arabia
19:00 UTC+3	Mazen 30'	Report		Stadium: King Fahd Sports City

20 October Friendly	Chad	0–1	Sudan	Taif, Saudi Arabia
19:00 UTC+3		Report	Abuaagla 18'	Stadium: King Fahd Sports City

11 November Friendly	Libya	2–3	Sudan	Benina, Libya
18:00 UTC+2	Al Badri 16'; Al Khouja 70'	Report	Hemedelnil 68' Mazen 77' Kome 90+1'	Stadium: Martyrs of February Stadium; Attendance: 0

16 November 2026 World Cup qualification	Sudan	1–1	Togo	Benina, Libya
18:00 UTC+2	Eisa 17' (pen.)	Report	Denkey 43'	Stadium: Martyrs of February Stadium; Referee: Andofetra Rakotojaona (Madagascar)

19 November 2026 World Cup qualification	Sudan	1–0	DR Congo	Benina, Libya
18:00 UTC+2	Pickel 79' (o.g.)	Report		Stadium: Martyrs of February Stadium; Attendance: 3,700; Referee: Bamlak Tessema Weyesa (Ethiopia)

=== 2024 ===
10 March Unofficial Friendly	Bangladesh	0–4	Sudan	Riyadh, Saudi Arabia
20:00 UTC+3		Report		Stadium: King Fahd Sports City

14 March Unofficial Friendly	Sudan	3–0	Bangladesh	Riyadh, Saudi Arabia
				Stadium: King Fahd Sports City

6 June 2026 World Cup qualification	Mauritania	0–2	Sudan	Nouakchott, Mauritania
16:00		Report	Bakhit 15'; Abeid 29' (o.g.)	Stadium: Stade Cheikha Ould Boïdiya; Referee: Daniel Nii Laryea (Chad)

11 June 2026 World Cup qualification	South Sudan	0–3	Sudan	Juba, South Sudan
15:00 UTC+2		Report	Khidir 45+3'; Muzmel 51'; Abdel Raman 78'	Stadium: Juba Stadium; Referee: Ahmad Heeralall (Mauritius)

4 September 2025 AFCON Q	Sudan	1–0	Niger	Juba, South Sudan
15:00 UTC+2	Eisa 51'	Report		Stadium: Juba Stadium; Referee: Pierre Jean Nguiene (Angolan Football Federation)

9 September 2025 AFCON Q	Angola	2–1	Sudan	Talatona, Angola
20:00 UTC+1	Mabululu 51' (pen.); Nteka 81'	Report	Karshoum 55'	Stadium: Estádio 11 de Novembro; Attendance: 35,000; Referee: Jalal Jayed

10 October 2025 AFCON Q	Ghana	0–0	Sudan	Accra, Ghana
16:00 UTC+0		Report		Stadium: The Accra Sports Stadium; Referee: Patrice Milazar (Mauritius)

15 October 2025 AFCON Q	Sudan	2–0	Ghana	Benghazi, Libya
16:00 UTC+0	Al-Tesh 62'; Abdelrahman 65'	Report		Stadium: Benina Martyrs Stadium; Referee: Ahmad Heeralall (Mauritius)

14 November 2025 AFCON Q	Niger	4-0	Sudan	Niamey, Niger
18:00 UTC+1	Sosah 6', 45+3' (pen.); Oumarou 29'; Badamassi 51'	Report		Stadium: Stade Général Seyni Kountché; Referee: Ahmad Heeralall (Mauritius)

18 November 2025 AFCON Q	Sudan	0-0	Angola	Benghazi, Libya
14:00 UTC+2		Report		Stadium: Benina Martyrs Stadium; Referee: Adissa Ligali (Benin)

=== 2025 ===
22 March 2026 World Cup qualification	Sudan	0–0	Senegal	Benghazi, Libya
21:00 UTC+2		Report		Stadium: Benina Martyrs Stadium; Referee: Patrice Tanguy Mebiame (Gabon)

24 March 2026 World Cup qualification	Sudan	1-1	South Sudan	Benghazi, Libya
21:00 UTC+2	M. Eisa 76'	Report	Sebit 90+8'	Stadium: Benina Martyrs Stadium; Referee: Jean Ouattara (Burkina Faso)

5 September 2026 World Cup qualification	Senegal	2-0	Sudan	Diamniadio, Senegal
19:00 UTC+0	Koulibaly 14'; P. Sarr 41'	Report		Stadium: Diamniadio Olympic Stadium; Referee: Ahmad Heeralall (Mauritius)

9 September 2026 World Cup qualification	Togo	1-0	Sudan	Lomé, Togo
16:00 UTC+0	Fofana 6'	Report		Stadium: Stade de Kégué; Referee: Andofetra Rakotojaona (Madagascar)

10 October 2026 World Cup qualification	Sudan	0-0	Mauritania	TBD
TBD				Stadium: TBA

14 October 2026 World Cup qualification	DR Congo	1-0	Sudan	Kinshasa, Democratic Republic of Congo
TBD				Stadium: Stade des Martyrs
