= Comoros at the Africa Cup of Nations =

Comoros participated in the Africa Cup of Nations for the first time in the 2021 edition in Cameroon, where the team reached the round of 16.

== Overall record ==
Africa Cup of Nations record										Africa Cup of Nations qualification record					
Year	Round	Position	Pld	W	D*	L	GF	GA	Squad	Pld	W	D	L	GF	GA
(Sudan) 1957	Part of France									Part of France					
(United Arab Republic) 1959	Part of France									Part of France					
(Ethiopia) 1962	Part of France									Part of France					
(Ghana) 1963	Part of France									Part of France					
(Tunisia) 1965	Part of France									Part of France					
(Ethiopia) 1968	Part of France									Part of France					
(Sudan) 1970	Part of France									Part of France					
(Egypt) 1974	Part of France									Part of France					
(Ethiopia) 1976	Not a CAF member									Not a CAF member					
(Ghana) 1978	Not a CAF member									Not a CAF member					
(Nigeria) 1980	Not a CAF member									Not a CAF member					
(Libya) 1982	Not a CAF member									Not a CAF member					
(Ivory Coast) 1984	Not a CAF member									Not a CAF member					
(Egypt) 1986	Not a CAF member									Not a CAF member					
(Morocco) 1988	Not a CAF member									Not a CAF member					
(Algeria) 1990	Not a CAF member									Not a CAF member					
(Senegal) 1992	Not a CAF member									Not a CAF member					
(Tunisia) 1994	Not a CAF member									Not a CAF member					
(South Africa) 1996	Not a CAF member									Not a CAF member					
(Burkina Faso) 1998	Not a CAF member									Not a CAF member					
(Ghana) (Nigeria) 2000	Not a CAF member									Not a CAF member					
(Mali) 2002	Not a CAF member									Not a CAF member					
(Tunisia) 2004	Did not enter									Did not enter					
(Egypt) 2006	Did not enter									Did not enter					
(Ghana) 2008	Did not enter									Did not enter					
(Angola) 2010	Did not qualify									2	0	0	2	2	10
(Gabon) (Equatorial Guinea) 2012	Did not qualify									6	0	1	5	2	14
(South Africa) 2013	Did not enter									Did not enter					
(Equatorial Guinea) 2015	Did not qualify									2	0	1	1	1	2
(Gabon) 2017	Did not qualify									6	1	0	5	2	7
(Egypt) 2019	Did not qualify									8	2	3	3	8	10
(Cameroon) 2021	Round of 16	16th	4	1	0	3	4	7	Squad	6	2	3	1	4	6
(Ivory Coast) 2023	Did not qualify									6	2	1	3	6	8
(Morocco) 2025	Qualified									6	3	3	0	7	4
(Kenya) (Tanzania) (Uganda) 2027	To be determined									To be determined					
Total	Round of 16	2/35	4	1	0	3	4	7	—	42	10	12	20	32	61

== Tournaments ==
=== 2021 Africa Cup of Nations ===
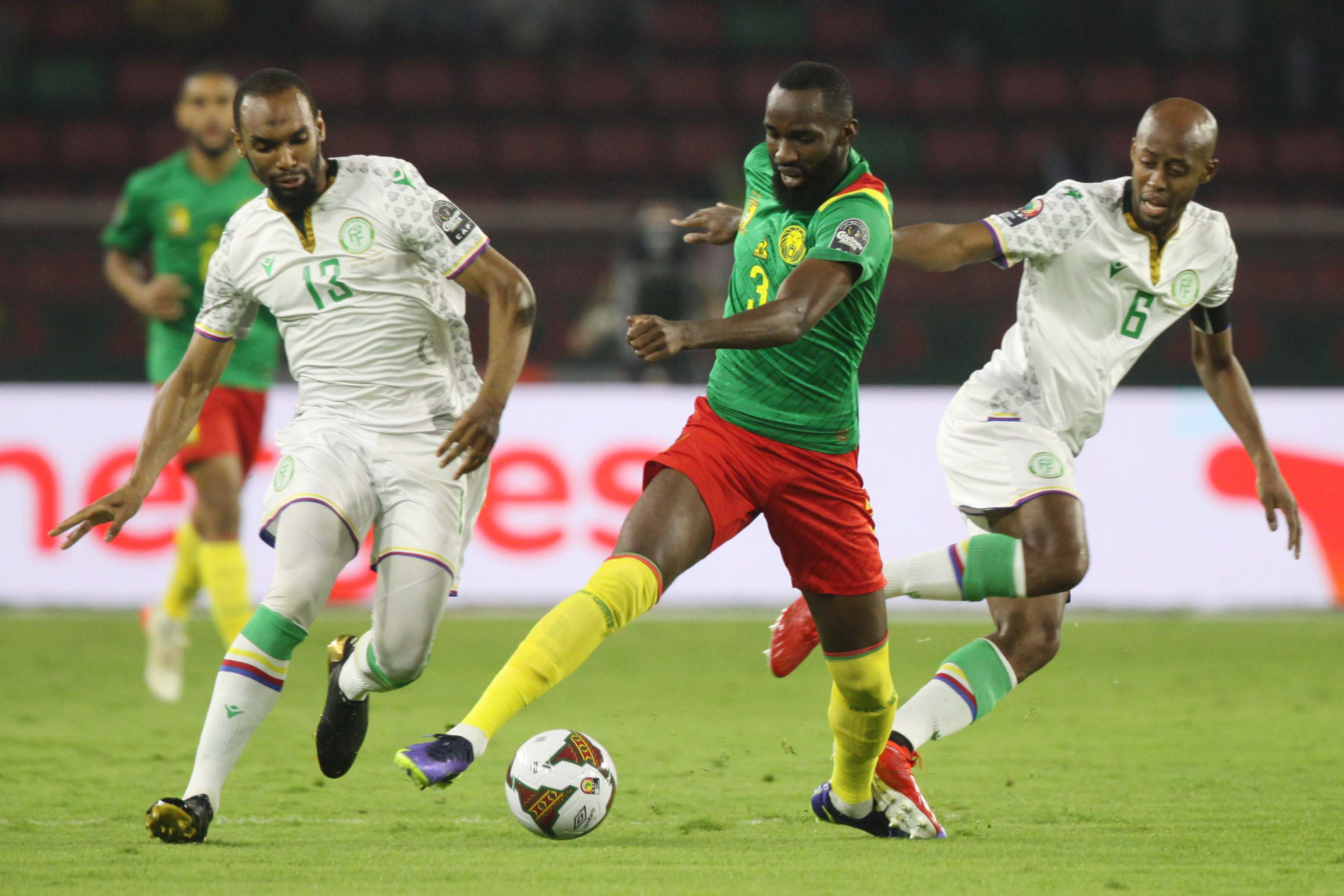
Comoros against Cameroon at the round of 16.

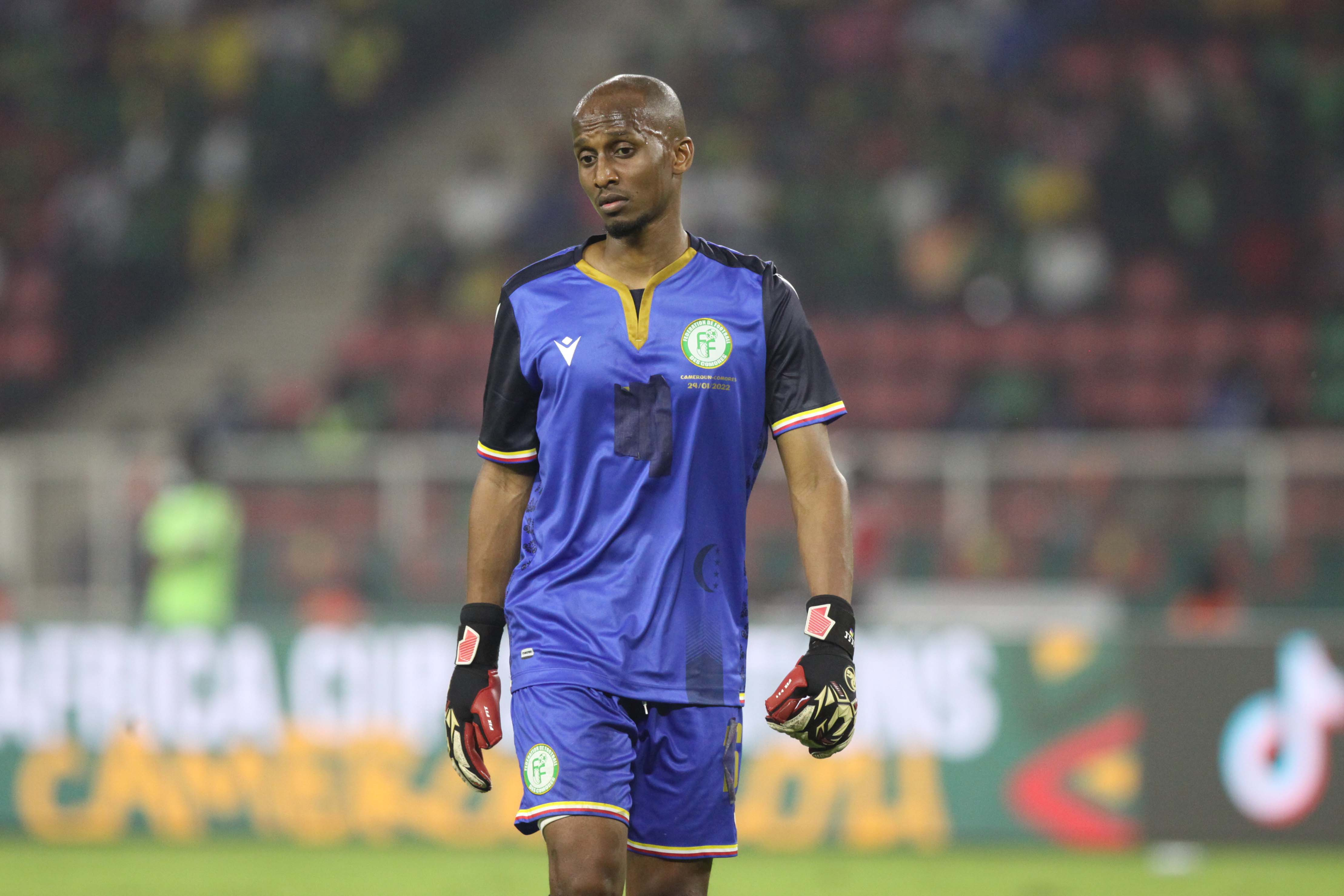
Defender Chaker Alhadhur participated in the round of 16 match against Cameroon as a goalkeeper.

The Comoros are in Group C of the 2021 Africa Cup of Nations, which takes place in January and February 2022 in Cameroon. Their first match sees them losing to Gabon 1–0. The second match also ended with a 2–0 defeat against Morocco, despite a noteworthy match by goalkeeper Salim Ben Boina, elected man of the match. The third match opposes the Comorians to Ghana. This meeting, where Salim Ben Boina is out through injury, ends with a historic victory for the Comorians 3–2, including 2 goals from Ahmed Mogni, eliminating Ghana, and allowing the Cœlacanthes to finish third in the group.

The selection finished fourth best third in the competition and qualified for the round of 16, which pitted them against the host country, Cameroon. Already deprived of Faïz Selemani, suspended, the Comorians have twelve positive cases of COVID-19 in their selection before the match, including all the goalkeepers available. On the same day, Ali Ahamada tested negative, but a same-day protocol change by the Confederation of African Football made him ineligible for the match, angering observers; it is then the defender Chaker Alhadhur who takes place in the goals. Despite all these adventures and an exclusion from the outset of captain Nadjim Abdou, the Comorians lost by the smallest of margins, by 2–1.

==== Group stage ====
Pos	Team	Pld	W	D	L	GF	GA	GD	Pts	Qualification
1	Morocco	3	2	1	0	5	2	+3	7	Advance to knockout stage
2	Gabon	3	1	2	0	4	3	+1	5	Advance to knockout stage
3	Comoros	3	1	0	2	3	5	−2	3	Advance to knockout stage
4	Ghana	3	0	1	2	3	5	−2	1	

Source: CAF
Rules for classification: Group stage tiebreakers
10 January 2022
20:00

Comoros	0–1	Gabon
	Report	Boupendza 16'

Ahmadou Ahidjo Stadium, Yaoundé
Referee: Peter Waweru (Kenya)

14 January 2022
17:00

Morocco	2–0	Comoros
Amallah 16'; Aboukhlal 88'	Report

Ahmadou Ahidjo Stadium, Yaoundé
Referee: Sadok Selmi (Tunisia)

18 January 2022
20:00

Ghana	2–3	Comoros
Boakye 64'; Djiku 77'	Report	Ben Nabouhane 4'; Mogni 62', 85'

Roumdé Adjia Stadium, Garoua
Referee: Boubou Traore (Mali)

==== Round of 16 ====
24 January 2022
20:00

Cameroon	2–1	Comoros
Toko Ekambi 29'; Aboubakar 70'	Report	Y. M'Changama 81'

Olembe Stadium, Yaoundé
Referee: Bamlak Tessema Weyesa (Ethiopia)

== Statistics ==
=== Goalscorers ===
Rank	Player	2021	Goals
1	Ahmed Mogni	2	2
2	El Fardou Ben Nabouhane	1	1
2	Youssouf M'Changama	1	1
Total		4	4

– Best goalscorer(s) of the team

== Kits ==
2021 Africa Cup of Nations
Home	Away
