= Assoumou =

Assoumou is a surname. Notable people with the surname include:

- Junior Assoumou (born 1995), Gabonese footballer
- Jaurès Assoumou (born 2002), Ivorian footballer
