= Faiz Mattoir =

Footballer (born 2000)

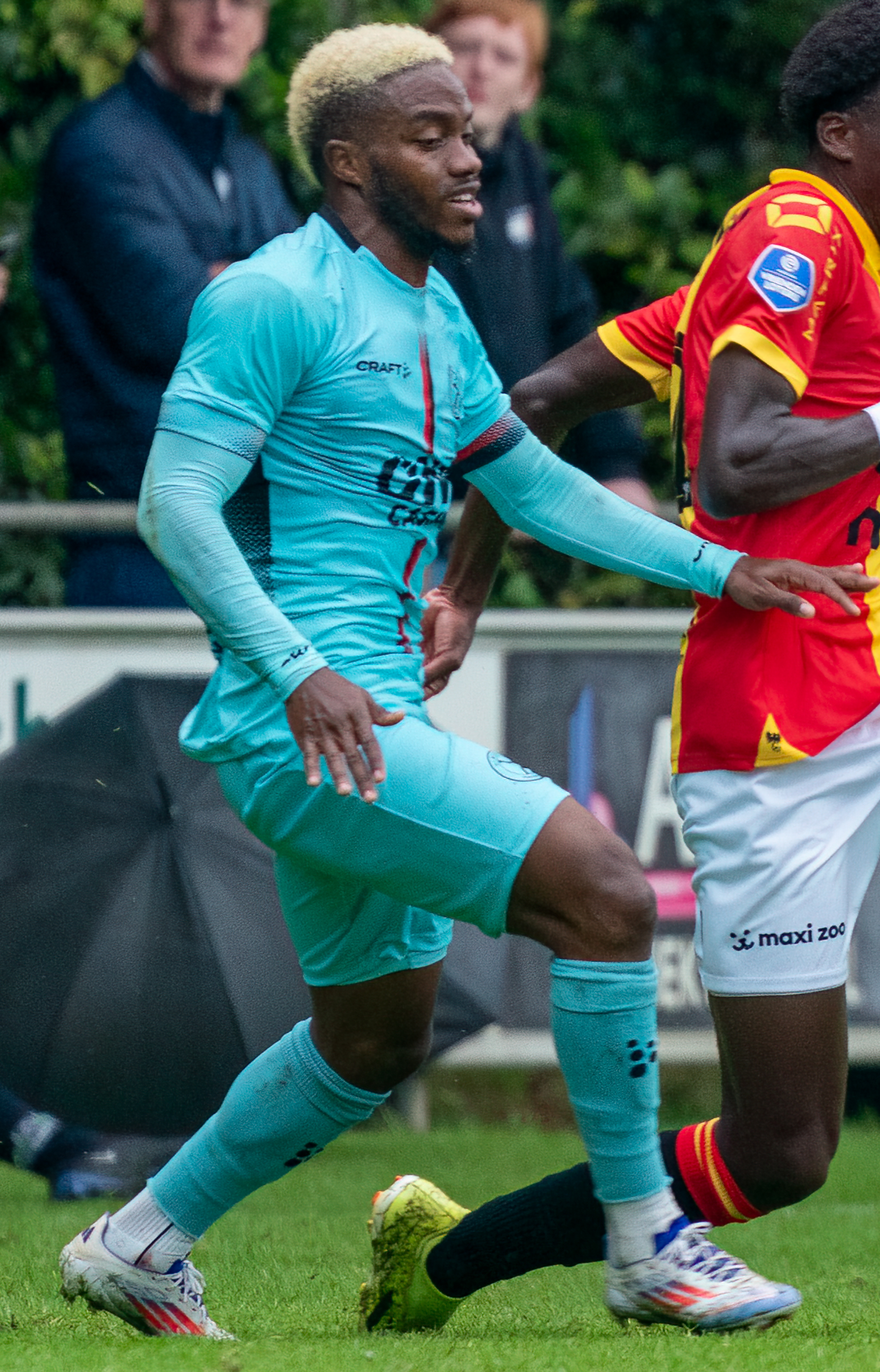

Personal information
- Date of birth: 12 July 2000 (age 26)
- Place of birth: Mamoudzou, Mayotte, France
- Height: 1.64 m (5 ft 5 in)
- Position: Winger

Youth career
- 2014–2017: Lyon
- 2017–2018: Troyes

Senior career*
Years	Team	Apps	(Gls)
2018–2020	Ajaccio B	16	(1)
2019–2022	Ajaccio	21	(0)
2021–2022	→ Cholet (loan)	23	(3)
2022–2025	Almere City	20	(1)
2025–2026	Septemvri Sofia	10	(0)

International career^{‡}
2020–	Comoros	18	(2)
- * Club domestic league appearances and goals as of 16 October 2026 ‡ National team caps and goals as of 14:44, 31 May 2025 (UTC)

Faiz Mattoir (born 12 July 2000) is a professional footballer who plays as a winger. Born in Mayotte, France, he plays for the Comoros national team.

== Early life ==
Mattoir was born on 12 July 2000 in Mamoudzou, Mayotte, France.

== Club career ==
Mattoir made his senior debut with Ajaccio in a 1–1 Ligue 2 draw with Clermont on 22 November 2019. He signed his first professional contract with the club on 10 June 2020.

Mattoir spent the 2021–22 season on loan at Championnat National side Cholet.

On 27 June 2022, Dutch Eerste Divisie club Almere City announced the signing of Mattoir on a two-year contract, with an option of an additional year. In August 2025, Mattoir signed a contract with Bulgarian First League club Septemvri Sofia.

== International career ==
Born in the French overseas department of Mayotte, Mattoir is of Comorian descent. He debuted for the Comoros national team in a 1–1 Africa Cup of Nations qualification draw with Kenya on 11 November 2020. He scored his first goal for the national team in a 2–1 win against Kenya in qualifying for the 2021 Africa Cup of Nations.

On 23 December 2021, coach Amir Abdou selected him in the final list of 28 players for the 2021 Africa Cup of Nations in Cameroon. Originally, due to be played in 2021, the tournament was postponed to January 2022 due to the COVID-19 pandemic in Africa. Comoros advanced to the round of 16 after defeating Ghana 3–2 in their final group match, eliminating their opponents from the competition. In the round of 16, Comoros lost 2–1 to Cameroon.

In 2022, he scored his second goal for the national team, the opening goal in a 2–1 friendly win against Ethiopia.

=== International goals ===
Scores and results list Comoros goal tally first, score column indicates score after each Mattoir goal.

List of international goals scored by Faiz Mattoir
No.	Date	Venue	Opponent	Score	Result	Competition
1	15 November 2020	Stade Omnisports de Malouzini, Moroni, Comoros	Kenya	2–1	2–1	2021 Africa Cup of Nations qualification
2	25 March 2022	Stade Omnisports de Malouzini, Moroni, Comoros	Ethiopia	1–0	2–1	Friendly
