= 2025 Africa Cup of Nations qualification Group F =

2025 AFCON qualifying group F

Group F of the 2025 Africa Cup of Nations qualification was one of twelve groups that decided the teams which qualified for the 2025 Africa Cup of Nations final tournament in Morocco. The group consisted of four teams: Ghana, Angola, Sudan and Niger.

The teams played against each other in a home-and-away round-robin format between September and November 2024.

Angola and Sudan, the group winners and runners-up respectively, qualified for the 2025 Africa Cup of Nations.

== Standings ==
Pos	Team	Pld	W	D	L	GF	GA	GD	Pts	Qualification	Angola	Sudan	Niger	Ghana
1	Angola	6	4	2	0	7	2	+5	14	Final tournament	—	2–1	2–0	1–1
2	Sudan	6	2	2	2	4	6	−2	8	Final tournament	0–0	—	1–0	2–0
3	Niger	6	2	1	3	7	6	+1	7		0–1	4–0	—	1–1
4	Ghana	6	0	3	3	3	7	−4	3		0–1	0–0	1–2	—

Source: CAF
Rules for classification: Tiebreakers

== Matches ==
4 September 2024
15:00 UTC+2

Sudan	1–0	Niger
Eisa 51'	Report

Juba Stadium, Juba (South Sudan)
Referee: Jean Pierre Nguiene (Congo)
5 September 2024
16:00 UTC+0

Ghana	0–1	Angola
	Report	Felício Milson 90+3'

Baba Yara Stadium, Kumasi
Referee: Samuel Uwikunda (Rwanda)

9 September 2024
16:00 UTC+1

Niger	1–1	Ghana
Sako 81'	Report	Seidu 44'

Berkane Municipal Stadium, Berkane (Morocco)
Referee: Lamin Jammeh (Gambia)
9 September 2024
20:00 UTC+1

Angola	2–1	Sudan
Mabululu 51' (pen.); Nteka 81'	Report	Karshoum 55'

Estádio 11 de Novembro, Talatona
Attendance: 35,000
Referee: Jalal Jayed (Morocco)

10 October 2024
16:00 UTC+0

Ghana	0–0	Sudan
	Report

Accra Sports Stadium, Accra
Referee: Patrice Milazar (Mauritius)
11 October 2024
20:00 UTC+1

Angola	2–0	Niger
Mabululu 75' (pen.); Felicio Milson 85'	Report

Estádio 11 de Novembro, Talatona
Referee: Pierre Atcho (Gabon)

15 October 2024
15:00 UTC+2

Sudan	2–0	Ghana
Al-Tash 62'; Abdelrahman 65'	Report

Benina Martyrs Stadium, Benghazi (Libya)
Referee: Mehrez Melki (Tunisia)
15 October 2024
17:00 UTC+1

Niger	0–1	Angola
	Report	Zini 1'

Larbi Zaouli Stadium, Casablanca (Morocco)
Referee: Adalbert Diouf (Senegal)

14 November 2024
16:00 UTC+1

Niger	4–0	Sudan
Sosah 6', 45+3' (pen.); Oumarou 29'; Badamassi 51'	Report

Stade de Kégué, Lomé (Togo)
Referee: Ahmad Heeralall (Mauritius)
15 November 2024
19:00 UTC+1

Angola	1–1	Ghana
Zini 64'	Report	Ayew 18'

Estádio 11 de Novembro, Talatona
Attendance: 40,000
Referee: George Gatogato (Burundi)

18 November 2024
13:00 UTC+0

Ghana	1–2	Niger
Afriyie 67'	Report	Badamassi 22'; Sako 90+2'

Accra Sports Stadium, Accra
Referee: Rulisa Patience Fidele (Central African Republic)
18 November 2024
14:00 UTC+2

Sudan	0–0	Angola
	Report

Benina Martyrs Stadium, Benghazi (Libya)
Referee: Adissa Ligali (Benin)

== Goalscorers ==
There were 21 goals scored in 12 matches, for an average of 1.75 goals per match.

2 goals

- (Angola) Mabululu
- (Angola) Felício Milson
- (Angola) Zini
- (Niger) Ousseini Badamassi
- (Niger) Oumar Sako
- (Niger) Daniel Sosah

1 goal

- (Angola) Randy Nteka
- (Ghana) Jerry Afriyie
- (Ghana) Jordan Ayew
- (Ghana) Alidu Seidu
- (Niger) Youssouf Oumarou
- (Sudan) Mohamed Abdelrahman
- (Sudan) Ahmed Al-Tash
- (Sudan) Abo Eisa
- (Sudan) Mustafa Karshoum
