= Joazhifel Soares =

São Toméan footballer

Personal information
- Full name: Joazhifel Soares da Cruz Sousa Pontes
- Date of birth: 19 January 1991 (age 35)
- Place of birth: São Tomé, São Tomé Island, São Tomé and Príncipe
- Height: 1.78 m (5 ft 10 in)
- Position: Midfielder

Team information
- Current team: UDRA
- Number: 8

Senior career*
Years	Team	Apps	(Gls)
2011–2012	Vitória Riboque		
2013–2016	Sporting Praia Cruz		
2017	UDRA		

International career
2011–	São Tomé and Príncipe	25	(1)
- * Club domestic league appearances and goals

Joazhifel Soares da Cruz Sousa Pontes (born 19 January 1991), commonly known as Jocy, is a São Toméan footballer who plays as a midfielder for UD Rei Amador and the São Tomé and Príncipe national team.

== Biography ==
Jocy was born in the capital city of São Tomé.

Jocy started playing football championship competitions with Vitória FC in 2011 which was the club's successful season. He then moved to Sporting Praia Cruz in 2013 where he currently plays. He returned to Vitória Riboque in 2014 and was number 30.

== International goals ==
No.	Date	Venue	Opponent	Score	Result	Competition
1.	16 November 2020	Nelson Mandela Bay Stadium, Port Elizabeth, South Africa	South Africa	1–0	2–4	2021 Africa Cup of Nations qualification
