= Felício Milson =

Angolan footballer (born 1999)

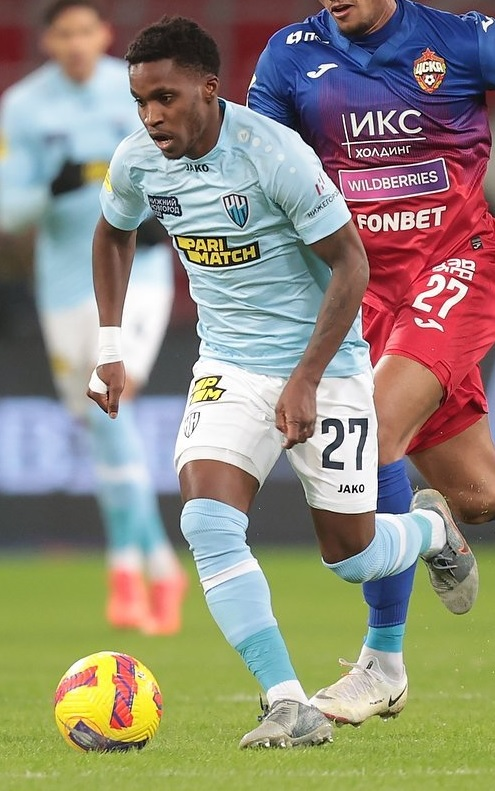
- Milson with Nizhny Novgorod in 2022

Personal information
- Full name: Felício Mendes João Milson
- Date of birth: 12 October 1999 (age 27)
- Place of birth: Luanda, Angola
- Height: 1.70 m (5 ft 7 in)
- Position: Winger

Team information
- Current team: Al Jazira
- Number: 77

Youth career
- 2017: Real Sambila
- 2017–2018: Leixões
- 2018–2019: Marítimo

Senior career*
Years	Team	Apps	(Gls)
2019–2022	Marítimo B	44	(13)
2020–2022	Marítimo	28	(1)
2022–2023	Pari Nizhny Novgorod	23	(2)
2023	→ Ankaragücü (loan)	10	(5)
2023–2024	Maccabi Tel Aviv	27	(7)
2024–2026	Red Star Belgrade	41	(6)
2026	→ Al Jazira (loan)	13	(2)
2026–	Al Jazira	0	(0)

International career^{‡}
2017	Angola U20	2	(0)
2020–	Angola	37	(6)
- * Club domestic league appearances and goals as of 7 December 2025 ‡ National team caps and goals as of 6 October 2026

Felício Mendes João Milson (born 12 October 1999) is an Angolan professional footballer who plays as a winger for UAE Pro League club Al Jazira and the Angola national team.

== Club career ==
Milson made his professional debut with Marítimo in a Primeira Liga match with FC Porto on 10 June 2020.

On 12 February 2022, Milson signed a long-term contract with Russian Premier League club Nizhny Novgorod.

On 3 February 2023, Milson joined Ankaragücü in Turkey on loan with an option to buy.

On 6 July 2023, Milson agreed on a three-year contract with Maccabi Tel Aviv in Israel.

== International career ==
Milson represented the Angola U20s at the 2017 Toulon Tournament. Milson debuted for the senior Angola national team in a 3-0 friendly win over Mozambique on 23 October 2020.

Convened for the 2023 Africa Cup of Nations, he played 3 matches in the competition, against Algeria, Burkina Faso and Nigeria.

On 3 December 2025, Milson was called up to the Angola squad for the 2025 Africa Cup of Nations.

== Career statistics ==
=== Club ===
As of match played 29 January 2026

Club	Season	League			National cup (Note: Includes Taça de Portugal, Russian Cup, Turkish Cup, Serbian Cup)		League cup (Note: Includes Taça da Liga)		Europe		Total	
Club	Season	Division	Apps	Goals	Apps	Goals	Apps	Goals	Apps	Goals	Apps	Goals
Marítimo B	2018–19	Campeonato de Portugal	6	1	–		–		–		6	1
Marítimo B	2019–20	Campeonato de Portugal	23	6	–		–		–		23	6
Marítimo B	2021–22	Campeonato de Portugal	15	6	–		–		–		15	6
Marítimo B	Total		44	13	–		–		–		44	13
Marítimo	2019–20	Primeira Liga	6	0	0	0	–		–		6	0
Marítimo	2020–21	Primeira Liga	21	1	3	0	0	0	–		24	1
Marítimo	2021–22	Primeira Liga	1	0	0	0	1	0	–		2	0
Marítimo	Total		28	1	3	0	1	0	–		32	1
Nizhny Novgorod	2021–22	Russian Premier League	7	0	1	0	–		–		8	0
Nizhny Novgorod	2022–23	Russian Premier League	16	2	5	0	–		–		21	2
Nizhny Novgorod	Total		23	2	6	0	–		–		29	2
Ankaragücü (loan)	2022–23	Süper Lig	10	5	2	0	–		–		12	5
Maccabi Tel Aviv	2023–24	Israeli Premier League	27	7	2	0	1	0	11	0	41	7
Red Star Belgrade	2024–25	Serbian SuperLiga	27	5	3	1	—		7 (Note: Appearances in UEFA Champions League)	2	37	8
Red Star Belgrade	2025–26	Serbian SuperLiga	14	1	0	0	—		12 (Note: Five appearances and one goal in UEFA Champions League, seven appearances in UEFA Europa League)	1	26	2
Red Star Belgrade	Total		41	6	3	1	—		19	3	63	10
Career total			173	34	16	1	3	0	30	3	221	38

=== International ===
As of match played 6 October 2026

Appearances and goals by national team and year
National team	Year	Apps	Goals
Angola	2020	2	0
Angola	2023	5	1
Angola	2024	12	2
Angola	2025	16	2
Angola	2026	2	1
Total		37	6

=== International goals ===
Scores and results list Angola's goal tally first, score column indicates score after each Milson goal.

No.	Date	Venue	Opponent	Score	Result	Competition
1	17 June 2023	Reunification Stadium, Douala, Cameroon	Central African Republic	2–1	2–1	2023 Africa Cup of Nations qualification
2	5 September 2024	Baba Yara Stadium, Kumasi, Ghana	Ghana	1–0	1–0	2025 Africa Cup of Nations qualification
3	11 October 2024	Estádio 11 de Novembro, Luanda, Angola	Niger	2–0	2–0	2025 Africa Cup of Nations qualification
4	15 June 2025	Free State Stadium, Bloemfontein, South Africa	South Africa	3–0	3–0	2025 COSAFA Cup
5	18 November 2025	Estádio 11 de Novembro, Luanda, Angola	Zambia	1–0	3–2	Friendly
6	6 October 2026	Estádio 11 de Novembro, Luanda, Angola	Malawi	1–0	3–1	2027 Africa Cup of Nations qualification

== Honours ==
Red Star Belgrade

- Serbian SuperLiga: 2024–25
- Serbian Cup: 2024–25
