= Moussa Djoumoi =

Footballer (born 1999)

Personal information
- Date of birth: 16 July 1999 (age 27)
- Place of birth: Mamoudzou, Mayotte
- Height: 1.78 m (5 ft 10 in)
- Position: Forward

Team information
- Current team: FC Portalban/Gletterens
- Number: 17

Youth career
- 2008–2016: FC Lyon
- 2016–2017: Lyon

Senior career*
Years	Team	Apps	(Gls)
2017–2018	Saint-Priest	3	(0)
2018–2019	Angers B	12	(1)
2019–2022	Saint-Priest	44	(10)
2022–2023	Stade Nyonnais	23	(2)
2023–	FC Portalban/Gletterens	4	(0)

International career^{‡}
2021–	Comoros	6	(1)
- * Club domestic league appearances and goals as of 10 September 2023 ‡ National team caps and goals as of 04:43, 26 June 2022 (UTC)

Moussa Djoumoi (born 16 July 1999) is a footballer who plays as a forward for Swiss fourth-tier 1. Liga club FC Portalban/Gletterens. Born in Mayotte, France, he plays for the Comoros national team.

== Club career ==
In 2008, Djoumoi began his youth career at FC Lyon in France where he remained for eight seasons, before joining the youth setup of Olympique Lyonnais in 2016. He moved to Saint-Priest one year later, where he played three games in the National 2. After one season, Djoumoi played for the reserve team of Angers in the National 3, scoring a goal in 12 games, before returning to Saint-Priest in 2019.

After his contract had expired in June 2022, Djoumoi joined Stade Nyonnais in the Swiss Promotion League on 8 August.

== International career ==
Djoumoi made his senior international debut for Comoros in a 2021 FIFA Arab Cup qualification match against Palestine, scoring his side's lone goal in a 5–1 defeat. He was part of the Comoros squad that first took part in the Africa Cup of Nations in 2021.

== Career statistics ==
=== International ===
As of match played 4 January 2022

Appearances and goals by national team and year
National team	Year	Apps	Goals
Comoros	2021	3	1
Total		3	1

Scores and results list Comoros' goal tally first, score column indicates score after each Djoumoi goal.

List of international goals scored by Moussa Djoumoi
No.	Date	Venue	Opponent	Score	Result	Competition	Ref.
1	24 June 2021	Jassim bin Hamad Stadium, Doha, Qatar	Palestine	1–0	1–5	2021 FIFA Arab Cup qualification	
