= Jean-Noël Amonome =

Gabonese footballer

Personal information
- Date of birth: 24 December 1997 (age 28)
- Place of birth: Libreville, Gabon
- Height: 1.90 m (6 ft 3 in)
- Position: Goalkeeper

Team information
- Current team: Tabora United
- Number: 32

Senior career*
Years	Team	Apps	(Gls)
2015–2018	FC 105 Libreville		
2018–2023	AmaZulu	0	(0)
2020	→ Royal Eagles (loan)	5	(0)
2020–2021	→ Uthongathi (loan)	19	(0)
2023	→ Uthongathi (loan)	15	(0)
2023–2024	Arta/Solar7		
2024–	Tabora United	15	(11)

International career^{‡}
2021–	Gabon	20	(0)
- * Club domestic league appearances and goals as of 25 October 2023 ‡ National team caps and goals as of 29 September 2026

Jean-Noël Amonome (born 24 December 1997) is a Gabonese professional footballer who plays as a goalkeeper for Tabora United and the Gabon national team.

== Career ==
Amonome began his career with the Gabonese club FC 105 Libreville, before transferring to the South African club AmaZulu. He went on loan to Royal Eagles in 2020. He made his professional debut with Royal Eagles in a 1–0 National First Division win over University of Pretoria on 15 March 2020.

== International career ==
Amonome debuted with the Gabon national team in a 3–0 2021 Africa Cup of Nations qualification win over DR Congo on 25 March 2021.

== Career statistics ==
=== International ===
As of match played 29 September 2026

Appearances and goals by national team and year
National team	Year	Apps	Goals
Gabon	2021	4	0
Gabon	2022	8	0
Gabon	2023	4	0
Gabon	2026	2	0
Total		18	0
