= Junior Assoumou =

French-born Gabonese footballer (born 1995)

Personal information
- Full name: Junior Assoumou Akue
- Date of birth: 22 July 1995 (age 31)
- Place of birth: Le Mans, France
- Height: 1.91 m (6 ft 3 in)
- Position: Centre back

Team information
- Current team: Granville

Senior career*
Years	Team	Apps	(Gls)
2012–2014	Rennes B	18	(0)
2014–2016	Chamois Niortais B	23	(0)
2016–2018	SO Romorantin	31	(0)
2018	Pau	11	(0)
2018–2019	Granville	20	(1)
2019–2020	Vitré	20	(0)
2020–2021	Bourges 18	4	(0)
2021–2022	Aubagne	10	(0)
2022–	Granville	1	(0)

International career^{‡}
2017–	Gabon	9	(0)
- * Club domestic league appearances and goals as of 20:50, 5 November 2022 (UTC) ‡ National team caps and goals as of 13:35, 13 March 2018 (UTC)

Junior Assoumou Akue (born 22 July 1995) is a footballer who plays for US Granville as a centre back. Born in France, he represents Gabon at international level.

== Career ==
Born in Le Mans, France, he has played club football for Rennes B, Chamois Niortais B, SO Romorantin and Pau.

He made his international debut for Gabon in 2017.
