= Mohamed Abdelrahman (footballer, born 1993) =

Sudanese footballer (born 1993)

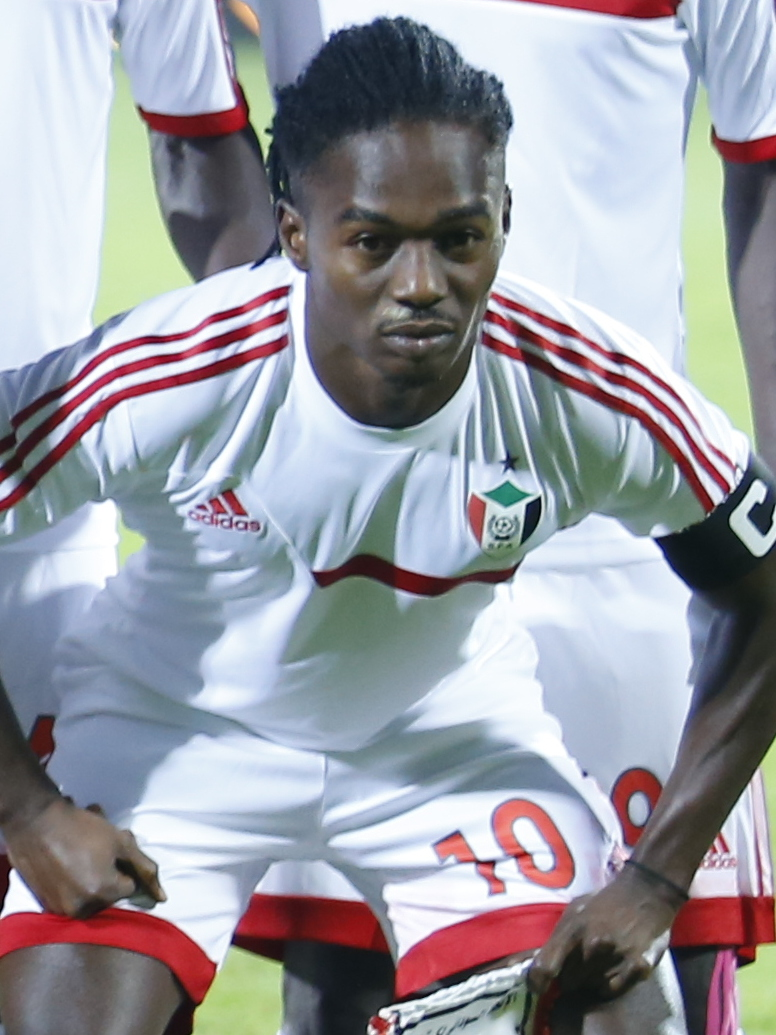
- Abdelrahman with Sudan in 2022

Personal information
- Full name: Mohamed Abdelrhman Yousif Yagub
- Date of birth: 10 July 1993 (age 33)
- Place of birth: Omdurman, Sudan
- Height: 1.75 m (5 ft 9 in)
- Position: Forward

Team information
- Current team: Al-Hilal
- Number: 10

Senior career*
Years	Team	Apps	(Gls)
2009–2010	Beit Al-Mal		
2010–2016	Al-Hilal		(13)
2017–2019	Al-Merrikh		(42)
2019–2020	CA Bordj Bou Arréridj	6	(2)
2020–	Al-Hilal		(58)

International career^{‡}
2017–	Sudan	64	(23)
- * Club domestic league appearances and goals as of 1 January 2025 ‡ National team caps and goals as of 3 January 2026

Mohamed Abdelrhman Yousif Yagub (Arabic: محمد عبد الرحمن يوسف يعقوب; born 10 July 1993), known as Al Gharbal (Arabic: الغربال), is a Sudanese professional footballer who plays as a forward for Sudan Premier League club Al-Hilal and the Sudan national team.

== Club career ==
On 21 November 2018, Abdelrahman scored after 22 seconds for Al-Merrikh against Algerian side USM Alger, becoming the fastest goalscorer of the Arab Club Champions Cup.

In November 2020, Abdelrahman made history by signing from Algerian side CA Bordj Bou Arréridj to Sudanese side Al-Hilal for a Sudanese-record $USD 1 million.

== International career ==
Abdelrahman was included in Sudan's squad for the 2021 Africa Cup of Nations.

== Career statistics ==
=== Club ===
As of match played on 1 January 2024

Appearances and goals by club, season and competition
Club	Season	League			National Cup		CECAFA		CAF Champions League		Arab Club Champions Cup		Total	
Club	Season	Division	Apps	Goals	Apps	Goals	Apps	Goals	Apps	Goals	Apps	Goals	Apps	Goals
Al-Hilal	2012	SPL		1			—				—			
Al-Hilal	2013	SPL		3			—				—			
Al-Hilal	2014	SPL		3			—				—			
Al-Hilal	2015	SPL		1			—		1	0	—			
Al-Hilal	2016	SPL		5			—				—			
Al-Hilal	2020-21	SPL	25	29			—		7	1	—			
Al-Hilal	2021-22	SPL		17			—		9	3	—			
Al-Hilal	2022-23	SPL		9			—		10	3	3	2		
Al-Hilal	2023-24	SPL		0			5	5	8	2				
Al-Hilal	2024-2025	Super D1		3			—		7	4				
Al-Hilal	Total			71		9	5	5	42	13				100
Al-Merrikh	2017	SPL		22			—		7	2	3	1		
Al-Merrikh	2018	SPL		15			—		—		—			
Al-Merrikh	2018-19	SPL		5			—		2	0	8	7		
Al-Merrikh	2020-21	SPL	—		—		—		—		2	0	2	0
Al-Merrikh	Total			42		4			9	2	13	8		56
Career total				113		13		5	51	15	16	10		156

=== International ===
As of match played 1 January 2025

Appearances and goals by national team and year
National team	Year	Apps	Goals
Sudan	2017	1	0
Sudan	2018	1	0
Sudan	2019	0	0
Sudan	2020	7	5
Sudan	2021	15	10
Sudan	2022	12	4
Sudan	2023	4	0
Sudan	2024	14	4
Total		55	23

Scores and results list Sudan's goal tally first, score column indicates score after each Abdelrahman goal.

List of international goals scored by Mohamed Abdelrahman
No.	Date	Venue	Opponent	Score	Result	Competition
1	23 September 2020	Stade Nacional, N'Djamena, Chad	Chad	1–0	3–2	Friendly
2	25 September 2020	Stade Nacional, N'Djamena, Chad	Chad	2–0	2–0	Friendly
3	12 October 2020	Stade El Menzah, Tunis, Tunisia	Togo	1–1	1–1	Friendly
4	6 November 2020	Addis Ababa Stadium, Addis Ababa, Ethiopia	Ethiopia	1–1	2–2	Friendly
5	17 November 2020	Al-Hilal Stadium, Omdurman, Sudan	Ghana	1–0	1–0	2021 Africa Cup of Nations qualification
6	24 March 2021	Estádio Nacional 12 de Julho, São Tomé, São Tomé and Príncipe	São Tomé and Príncipe	1–0	2–0	2021 Africa Cup of Nations qualification
7	28 March 2021	Al-Hilal Stadium, Omdurman, Sudan	South Africa	2–0	2–0	2021 Africa Cup of Nations qualification
8	11 June 2021	Al-Hilal Stadium, Omdurman, Sudan	Zambia	1–0	3–2	Friendly
9	11 June 2021	Al-Hilal Stadium, Omdurman, Sudan	Zambia	3–1	3–2	Friendly
10	19 June 2021	Khalifa International Stadium, Doha, Qatar	Libya	1–0	1–0	2021 FIFA Arab Cup qualification
11	26 August 2021	Al Maktoum Stadium, Dubai, United Arab Emirates	Niger	1–0	3–0	Friendly
12	7 September 2021	Al-Hilal Stadium, Omdurman, Sudan	Guinea-Bissau	1–3	2–4	2022 FIFA World Cup qualification
13	7 September 2021	Al-Hilal Stadium, Omdurman, Sudan	Guinea-Bissau	2–4	2–4	2022 FIFA World Cup qualification
14	30 December 2021	Limbe Stadium, Limbe, Cameroon	Ethiopia	1–1	2–3	Friendly
15	30 December 2021	Limbe Stadium, Limbe, Cameroon	Ethiopia	2–3	2–3	Friendly
16	8 June 2022	Al-Hilal Stadium, Omdurman, Sudan	DR Congo	2–0	2–1	2023 Africa Cup of Nations qualification
17	26 August 2022	Stade de Marrakech, Marrakesh, Morocco	Djibouti	2–0	4–1	2022 African Nations Championship
18	26 August 2022	Stade de Marrakech, Marrakesh, Morocco	Djibouti	3–0	4–1	2022 African Nations Championship
19	26 September 2022	Abebe Bikila Stadium, Addis Ababa, Ethiopia	Ethiopia	2–2	2–2	Friendly
20	11 June 2024	Juba Stadium, Juba, South Sudan	South Sudan	3–0	3–0	2026 FIFA World Cup qualification
21	15 October 2024	Benina Martyrs Stadium, Benghazi, Libya	Ghana	2–0	2–0	2025 Africa Cup of Nations qualification
22	27 October 2024	Cheikha Ould Boïdiya Stadium, Nouakchott, Mauritania	Tanzania	1–0	1–0	2024 African Nations Championship qualification
23	25 December 2024	Benina Martyrs Stadium, Benghazi, Libya	Ethiopia	2–1	2–1	2024 African Nations Championship qualification
