= Salim Ben Boina =

Footballer (born 1991)

Personal information
- Date of birth: 19 July 1991 (age 35)
- Place of birth: Marseille, France
- Height: 1.89 m (6 ft 2 in)
- Position: Goalkeeper

Team information
- Current team: Istres

Senior career*
Years	Team	Apps	(Gls)
2011–2012	SC Montredon Bonneveine		
2012–2014	Gardanne		
2014–2017	Marseille Consolat (Note: In 2018, Marseille Consolat was renamed to Athlético Marseille.)	8	(0)
2017–2018	Martigues	5	(0)
2018–2019	Athlético Marseille	15	(0)
2019–2021	Martigues	6	(0)
2021–2022	Marseille Endoume	9	(0)
2022–2025	Épinal	69	(0)
2025–	Istres	0	(0)

International career^{‡}
2015–	Comoros	27	(0)
- * Club domestic league appearances and goals as of 06:47, 1 August 2025 (UTC) ‡ National team caps and goals as of 06:49, 1 August 2025 (UTC)

Salim Ben Boina (born 19 July 1991) is a professional footballer who plays as a goalkeeper for Championnat National 1 club Istres. Born in France, he plays for the Comoros national team.

== Club career ==
Born in Marseille, Boina has played for Montredon Bonneveine, Gardanne, Consolat Marseille, Martigues, Athlético Marseille, and Marseille Endoume, all of which are in the Bouches-du-Rhône department of France.

== International career ==
Ben Boina made his international debut for Comoros in 2015, and was a squad member at the 2021 Africa Cup of Nations.

On 11 December 2025, Ben Boina was called up to the Comoros squad for the 2025 Africa Cup of Nations.
