= Amir Abdou =

Comorian football manager (born 1972)

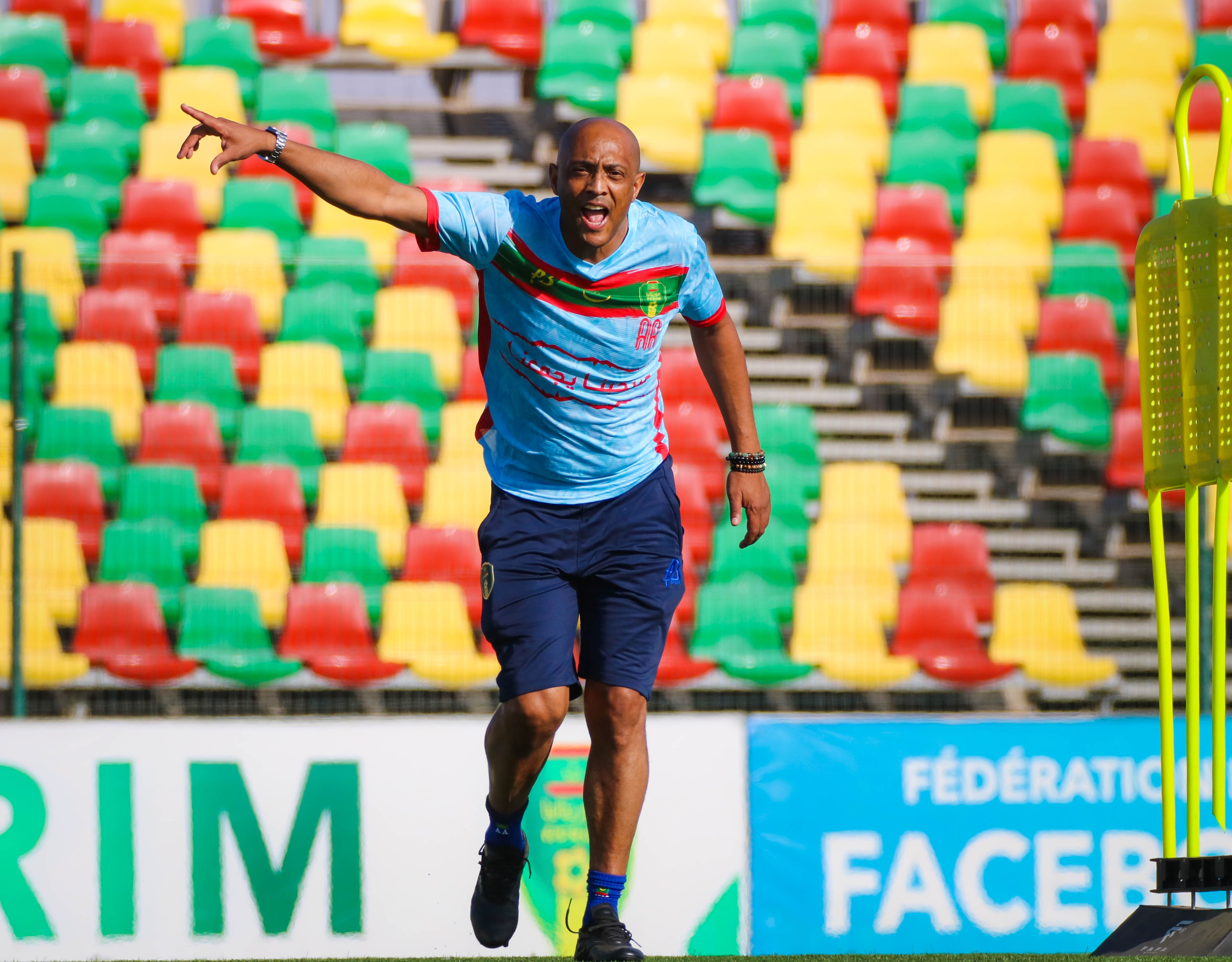

Personal information
- Date of birth: 8 July 1972 (age 54)
- Place of birth: Marseille, France

Team information
- Current team: Burkina Faso (head coach)

Managerial career
- Years: Team
- 2010–2012: SU Agen Football
- 2012–2014: Entente Golfech
- 2014–2022: Comoros
- 2020–2022: FC Nouadhibou
- 2022–2024: Mauritania
- 2025–2026: Hassania Agadir
- 2026–: Burkina Faso

Amir Abdou (Arabic: آمير عبدو; born 8 July 1972) is a French-Comorian professional football manager, who coached the Mauritania national team until 2024.

== Career ==
In 2012, Abdou began his coaching career in the French club Golfech. From 13 January 2014 he coached Comoros national team. He signed a new contract in January 2019. Abdou spent eight years in charge of Comoros and led them to their first ever Nations Cup finals in Cameroon.

On 3 March 2022, he joined the Mauritania national team. He led them out of the groups for the first time in their history.

Managerial record by team and tenure
Team	Nat	From	To	Record					Ref.
Team	Nat	From	To	G	W	D	L	Win %	Ref.
Mauritania		2022	present	26	10	2	14	38.46	
Career Total				26	10	2	14	38.46	—
