= Ahmed Mogni =

Footballer (born 1991)

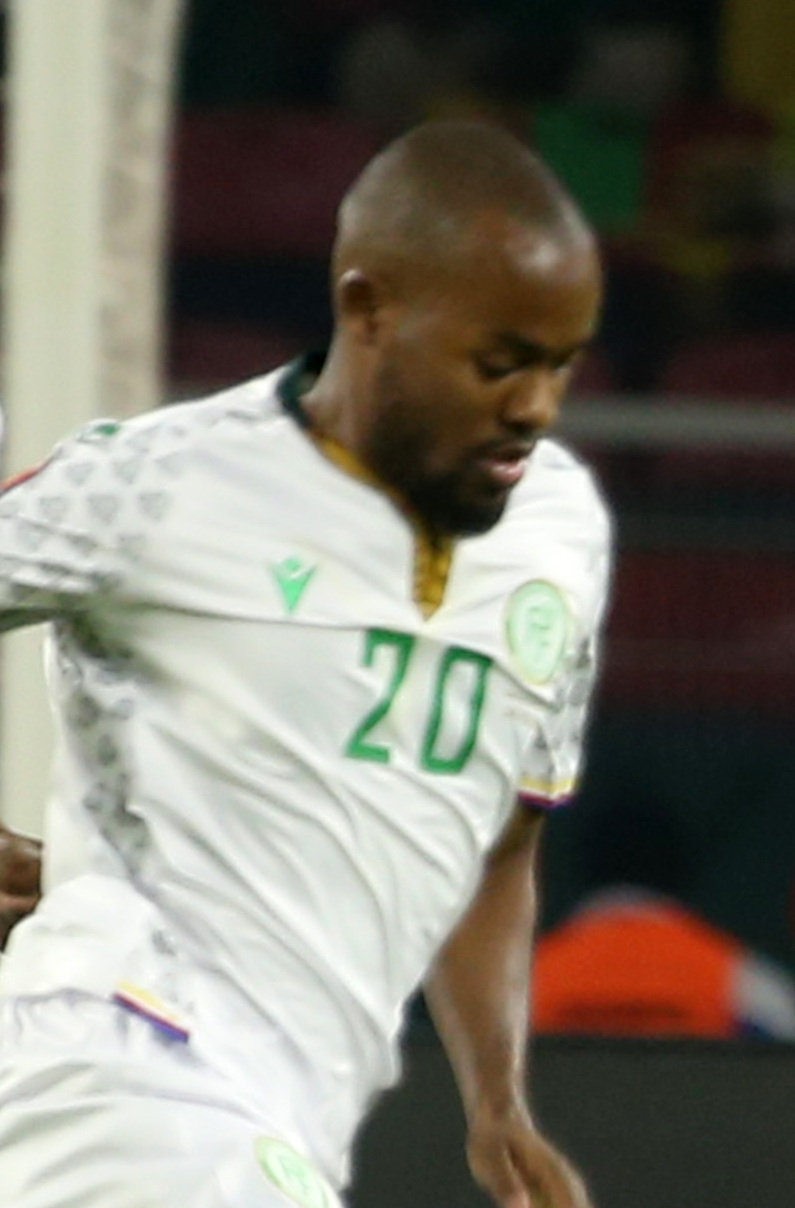
- Mogni with Comoros in 2022

Personal information
- Date of birth: 10 October 1991 (age 35)
- Place of birth: Paris, France
- Height: 1.75 m (5 ft 9 in)
- Position: Left winger

Team information
- Current team: Jeunesse Esch
- Number: 21

Youth career
- –2009: Paris Université Club
- 2009–2010: FC Issy-les-Moulineaux

Senior career*
Years	Team	Apps	(Gls)
2010–2012	Boulogne-Billancourt		
2012–2014	Évry	42	(4)
2014–2016	Paris FC B	34	(12)
2015–2016	Paris FC	10	(1)
2017–2018	Boulogne-Billancourt	21	(4)
2019–2020	FC 93	14	(1)
2020–2022	Annecy	23	(3)
2023–	Jeunesse Esch	43	(13)

International career^{‡}
2015–	Comoros	31	(4)
- * Club domestic league appearances and goals as of 1 June 2024 ‡ National team caps and goals as of 20 November 2024

Ahmed Mogni (born 10 October 1991) is a professional footballer who plays as a left winger for Jeunesse Esch in Luxembourg. Born in France, he plays for the Comoros national team.

== Club career ==
Born in Paris, Mogni trained with Paris Université Club until the age of 17, and then with FC Issy-les-Moulineaux, Boulogne-Billancourt and played for Évry in the fifth level of French football. In 2014 he signed with the reserve team of Paris FC, and after a good season he signed a professional contract with the club.

Mogni made his Ligue 2 debut with Paris FC on 23 October 2015, in the 1–1 draw with Chamois Niortais.

Mogni re-signed for Boulogne-Billancourt against for the 2017–18 season, and after a season there moved to FC 93. In June 2020 he moved to Annecy. Mogni scored two goals on his competitive debut for Annecy against Le Mans in a 3–3 draw on 21 August 2020.

== International career ==
Mogni made his international debut for Comoros in 2015, and was a squad member at the 2021 Africa Cup of Nations. He scored two goals in a 3–2 group match victory over Ghana in what the BBC described as "one of the biggest shocks in Nations Cup history".

=== International goals ===
Scores and results list the Comoros' goal tally first.

No.	Date	Venue	Opponent	Score	Result	Competition
1.	1 September 2021	Stade de Moroni, Moroni, Comoros	Seychelles	3–0	7–1	Friendly
2.	1 September 2021	Stade de Moroni, Moroni, Comoros	Seychelles	4–0	7–1	Friendly
3.	18 January 2022	Roumdé Adjia Stadium, Garoua, Cameroon	Ghana	2–0	3–2	2021 Africa Cup of Nations
4.	18 January 2022	Roumdé Adjia Stadium, Garoua, Cameroon	Ghana	3–2	3–2	2021 Africa Cup of Nations
