= 2021 Africa Cup of Nations qualification Group C =

Football competition

Group C of the 2021 Africa Cup of Nations qualification tournament was one of the twelve groups that decided the teams which qualified for the 2021 Africa Cup of Nations finals tournament. The group consisted of four teams: Ghana, South Africa, Sudan, and São Tomé and Príncipe (winners of the preliminary round).

The teams played against each other in home-and-away round-robin format, originally scheduled between November 2019 and September 2020.

Due to the COVID-19 pandemic in Africa, all matches of matchdays 3 and 4 scheduled for March 2020 were postponed until further notice. FIFA recommended that all June 2020 international matches (matchday 5) be postponed, and also postponed the September 2020 window (matchday 6) for CAF.

On 30 June 2020, the CAF announced the 2021 Africa Cup of Nations final tournament had been postponed from January 2021 to January 2022, without announcing the new dates of the remaining qualifiers. On 19 August 2020, the CAF announced the new dates of the remaining qualifiers, with matchdays 3 and 4 rescheduled to be played between 9–17 November 2020, and matchdays 5 and 6 rescheduled to be played between 22 and 30 March 2021.

Ghana and Sudan, the group winners and runners-up respectively, qualified for the 2021 Africa Cup of Nations.

== Standings ==
Pos	Team	Pld	W	D	L	GF	GA	GD	Pts	Qualification	Ghana	Sudan	South Africa	São Tomé and Príncipe
1	Ghana	6	4	1	1	9	3	+6	13	Final tournament	—	2–0	2–0	3–1
2	Sudan	6	4	0	2	9	3	+6	12	Final tournament	1–0	—	2–0	4–0
3	South Africa	6	3	1	2	8	7	+1	10		1–1	1–0	—	2–0
4	São Tomé and Príncipe	6	0	0	6	3	16	−13	0		0–1	0–2	2–4	—

Source: CAF
Rules for classification: Tiebreakers

== Matches ==
13 November 2019
21:00 UTC+2

Sudan	4–0	São Tomé and Príncipe
Ramadan 7'; Hamid 44'; Diogo 62' (o.g.); Al Rasheed 77'	Report

Al-Hilal Stadium, Omdurman
Referee: Mohamed Ali Moussa (Niger)
14 November 2019
19:00 UTC+0

Ghana	2–0	South Africa
Partey 36'; Kudus 80'	Report

Cape Coast Sports Stadium, Cape Coast
Referee: Mustapha Ghorbal (Algeria)

17 November 2019
15:00 UTC+2

South Africa	1–0	Sudan
Phiri 45'	Report

Orlando Stadium, Johannesburg
Referee: Eric Otogo-Castane (Gabon)
18 November 2019
16:00 UTC+0

São Tomé and Príncipe	0–1	Ghana
	Report	J. Ayew 50' (pen.)

Estádio Nacional 12 de Julho, São Tomé
Referee: Messie Nkounkou Mvoutou (Congo)

12 November 2020
16:00 UTC+0

Ghana	2–0	Sudan
A. Ayew 19', 81'	Report

Cape Coast Sports Stadium, Cape Coast
Referee: Maguette N'Diaye (Senegal)
13 November 2020
21:00 UTC+2

South Africa	2–0	São Tomé and Príncipe
Tau 55' (pen.); Zungu 90+1'	Report

Moses Mabhida Stadium, Durban
Referee: Thulani Sibandze (Eswatini)

16 November 2020
15:00 UTC+2

São Tomé and Príncipe	2–4	South Africa
Jocy 12'; Harramiz 75'	Report	Zwane 39', 87'; Tau 70', 88'

Nelson Mandela Bay Stadium, Port Elizabeth (Note: Due to the COVID-19 pandemic, the São Toméan Football Federation agreed to play their home match against South Africa in Port Elizabeth.)
Referee: Tawel Camara Younoussa (Guinea)
17 November 2020
15:00 UTC+2

Sudan	1–0	Ghana
Abdel Rahman 90+2'	Report

Al-Hilal Stadium, Omdurman
Referee: Joshua Bondo (Botswana)

24 March 2021
19:00 UTC+0

São Tomé and Príncipe	0–2	Sudan
	Report	Abdel Rahman 27'; Teiri 55'

Estádio Nacional 12 de Julho, São Tomé
Referee: Samuel Pwadutakam (Nigeria)
25 March 2021
18:00 UTC+2

South Africa	1–1	Ghana
Tau 51'	Report	Kudus 49'

FNB Stadium, Johannesburg
Referee: Bamlak Tessema Weyesa (Ethiopia)

28 March 2021
16:00 UTC+0

Ghana	3–1	São Tomé and Príncipe
N. Opoku 12'; J. Ayew 31' (pen.); Baba Rahman 60'	Report	Iniesta 83'

Cape Coast Sports Stadium, Cape Coast
Referee: Souleiman Ahmed Djama (Djibouti)
28 March 2021
18:00 UTC+2

Sudan	2–0	South Africa
Teiri 5'; Abdel Rahman 32'	Report

Al-Hilal Stadium, Omdurman
Referee: Helder Martins de Carvalho (Angola)

== Goalscorers ==
There were 29 goals scored in 12 matches, for an average of 2.42 goals per match.

4 goals

- (South Africa) Percy Tau

3 goals

- (Sudan) Mohamed Abdelrahman

2 goals

- (Ghana) André Ayew
- (Ghana) Jordan Ayew
- (Ghana) Mohammed Kudus
- (South Africa) Themba Zwane
- (Sudan) Seif Teiri

1 goal

- (Ghana) Nicholas Opoku
- (Ghana) Thomas Partey
- (Ghana) Baba Rahman
- (South Africa) Lebogang Phiri
- (South Africa) Bongani Zungu
- (São Tomé and Príncipe) Harramiz
- (São Tomé and Príncipe) Iniesta
- (São Tomé and Príncipe) Jocy
- (Sudan) Ramadan Agab
- (Sudan) Mohamed Elrasheed
- (Sudan) Ahmed Hamid

1 own goal

- (São Tomé and Príncipe) Jordão Diogo (against Sudan)
