= Ousseini Badamassi =

Nigerien footballer

Personal information
- Full name: Ousseini Soumaila Badamassi
- Date of birth: 21 April 1997 (age 29)
- Place of birth: Niamey, Niger
- Height: 1.81 m (5 ft 11 in)
- Position: Midfielder

Team information
- Current team: Ahed
- Number: 12

Senior career*
Years	Team	Apps	(Gls)
2015–2020	AS SONIDEP		
2020–2022	AS GNN		
2022–2023	AS Douanes		
2023–2025	TP Mazembe		
2025–2026	KAC Marrakech	0	(0)
2026	Jwaya	16	(3)
2026–	Ahed	0	(0)

International career^{‡}
2021–	Niger	22	(4)
- * Club domestic league appearances and goals as of 19:03, 14 January 2026 (UTC) ‡ National team caps and goals as of 15 November 2025

Ousseini Soumaila Badamassi (born 21 April 1997) is a Nigerien footballer who plays for Lebanese Premier League club Ahed and the Niger national team.

== Club career ==
Playing for AS SONIDEP in his home country, he won the league in 2018 and the double in 2019. From 2020 to 2023 he played for AS GNN and AS Douanes.

In May 2023 he went abroad and signed for perennial Linafoot title contenders TP Mazembe. He competed in African continental competition with TP Mazembe.

In May 2025, TP Mazembe accused Badamassi of disciplinary misconduct during an away trip. Badamassi, Mercey Ngimbi and Ibrahima Keita were omitted from the squad. The trio allegedly did not "comply with the instructions" and refused to hand over their phones.

== International career ==
With Niger he reached the semi-final of the 2022 African Nations Championship (which was staged in 2023). During the 2025 Africa Cup of Nations qualification, Badamassi scored for Niger against Sudan and Ghana.

== Career statistics ==
=== International ===
As of match played 15 November 2025.

Niger national team
Year	Apps	Goals
2021	3	0
2022	2	0
2023	6	1
2024	4	2
2025	7	1
Total	22	4
