= Ahmed Al-Tash =

Professional football player

Ahmed Al-Tesh
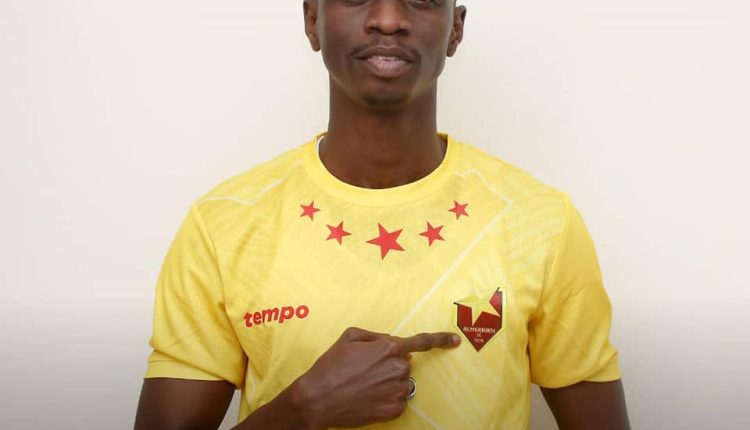

Personal information
- Full name: Ahmed Hamed Mahmoud
- Date of birth: 7 March 1993 (age 33)
- Place of birth: Wau, Sudan
- Position: Midfielder

Team information
- Current team: Asswehly SC
- Number: 18

Senior career*
Years	Team	Apps	(Gls)
2014–2017	Al Khartoum SC		
2017–2024	Al-Merrikh SC		
2024	Asswehly SC (loan)		
2024-	Asswehly SC		

International career^{‡}
2019–	Sudan	21	(3)
- * Club domestic league appearances and goals as of 1 August 2024 ‡ National team caps and goals as of 14 November 2024

Ahmed Hamed Mahmoud "Al-Tesh" (born on 7 March 1993) is a Sudanese professional football player who plays for the Sudanese national team.

On 9 October 2021, he scored his first goal for Sudan against Guinea during the 2022 FIFA World Cup qualification match in a 2–2 draw.
