= 2022 African Nations Championship Group A =

Football tournament group stage

Group A of the 2022 African Nations Championship, consisting of hosts Algeria, Libya, Ethiopia and Mozambique, began on 13 January and ended on 21 January 2023.

== Teams ==
Draw position	Team	Zone	Date of qualification	Appearance at Finals	Last appearance	Previous best performance							
Draw position	Team	Zone	Date of qualification	Appearance at Finals	Last appearance	Previous best performance	A1	Algeria	Northern Zone	29 September 2018	2nd	2011	Fourth place (2011)
A2	Libya	Northern Zone	26 May 2022	5th	2020	Champions (2014)							
A3	Ethiopia	Central Eastern Zone	3 September 2022	3rd	2016	Group stage (2014, 2016)							
A4	Mozambique	Southern Zone	4 September 2022	2nd	2014	Group stage (2014)							

== Standings ==
Pos	Team	Pld	W	D	L	GF	GA	GD	Pts	Qualification
1	Algeria (H)	3	3	0	0	3	0	+3	9	Knockout stage
2	Mozambique	3	1	1	1	3	3	0	4	Knockout stage
3	Libya	3	1	0	2	5	5	0	3	
4	Ethiopia	3	0	1	2	1	4	−3	1	

Source: CAF
Rules for classification: Tiebreakers
(H) Hosts

== Matches ==
=== Algeria vs Libya ===
13 January 2023
20:00

Algeria	1–0	Libya
Mahious 57' (pen.)	Report

Nelson Mandela Stadium, Algiers
Attendance: 41,000
Referee: Tom Abongile (South Africa)

Algeria	Libya

Formation: 4–2–3–1
GK	16	Alexis Guendouz
DF	22	Mokhtar Belkhiter
DF	15	Zineddine Belaïd
DF	5	Ayoub Abdellaoui (c)
DF	21	Youcef Laouafi	(yellow card) 90+1'
MF	6	Ahmed Kendouci
MF	8	Zakaria Draoui
FW	18	Aymen Mahious		(substituted off) 61'
MF	14	Houssem Eddine Mrezigue
FW	7	Abderrahmane Meziane
FW	17	Aimen Lahmeri		(substituted off) 71'
Substitutions:
DF	2	Chouaib Keddad
MF	27	Mohamed Ait El Hadj
MF	4	Akram Djahnit
MF	11	Oussama Chita
FW	10	Féth-Allah Tahar		(substituted on) 90+2'
FW	9	Karim Aribi	(yellow card) 90+2'	(substituted on) 61'
GK	23	Chamseddine Rahmani
DF	28	Houari Baouche
FW	13	Mohamed Islam Bakir
DF	24	Saâdi Radouani
MF	25	Chouaib Debbih		(substituted on) 71' (substituted off) 90+2'
DF	3	Hocine Dehiri
Coach:
(Algeria) Madjid Bougherra

Formation: 4–3–3
GK	1	Muad Allafi
DF	23	Muayid Jaddour		(substituted off) 87'
DF	13	Mohamed El-Munir
DF	14	Ali Ramadhan (c)	(yellow card) 81'
DF	15	Mahmoud Okashah		(substituted off) 90+4'
MF	25	Mohammed Touhami
MF	18	Abdulati Abbasi	(yellow card) 66'	(substituted off) 69'
MF	6	Belkasim Rajab
FW	20	Anis Saltou
FW	10	Omar Al Khouja
FW	8	Mansour Makkari
Substitutions:
MF	5	Mustafa Hamza
DF	4	Ali Almusrati
FW	7	Ahmed Karwaa
FW	9	Saleh Taher Saeid
MF	21	Talal Farhat		(substituted on) 90+4'
MF	16	Suhaib Shafshuf
GK	12	Murad Al Woheshi
MF	24	Oussama Belaid		(substituted on) 87'
GK	22	Muad Al Mansoori
FW	19	Muad Eisay		(substituted on) 69'
MF	17	Ali Arqoub
FW	11	Amer Muftah
Coach:
(France) Corentin Martins

Man of the Match:
Houssem Eddine Mrezigue (Algeria)

Assistant referees:
Ivanildo Meirelles De O Sanche Lopes (Angola)
Kwasi Brobbey (Ghana)
Fourth official:
Samuel Uwikunda (Rwanda)

=== Ethiopia vs Mozambique ===
14 January 2023
14:00

Ethiopia	0–0	Mozambique
	Report

Nelson Mandela Stadium, Algiers
Referee: Vincentia Amédomé (Togo)

Ethiopia	Mozambique

Formation: 4–3–3
GK	23	Fasil Gerbremichael
DF	5	Million Solomon
DF	20	Ramadan Yusef
DF	2	Suleman Hamid (c)
DF	4	Mignot Debebe
MF	19	Fuad Fereja	(substituted off) 62'
MF	3	Mesud Mohammed
MF	6	Gatoch Panom
FW	8	Kenean Markneh	(substituted off) 81'
FW	7	Chernet Gugesa	(substituted off) 81'
FW	11	Amanuel Gebremichael
Substitutions:
FW	10	Beneyam Demte	(substituted on) 62'
GK	1	Bereket Amare
DF	13	Git Gatkut
FW	14	Duresa Shubisa	(substituted on) 89'
MF	12	Yihun Endashew
MF	18	Wondmageng Hailu	(substituted on) 81' (substituted off) 89'
DF	15	Aschalew Tamene
FW	17	Kitika Jemma	(substituted on) 81'
MF	21	Alelegn Azene
FW	9	Yigezu Bogale
DF	26	Bekele Berhane
GK	22	Bahiru Negash
Coach:
(Ethiopia) Wubetu Abate

Formation: 4–4–2
GK	12	Guambe
DF	13	Martinho
DF	14	Chico
DF	4	Danilo
DF	2	Infren
MF	16	Telinho (c)	(substituted off) 89'
MF	23	Shaquille
MF	6	Amadou
MF	7	Nelson	(substituted off) 62'
FW	19	Lau King	(substituted off) 62'
FW	21	Kito	(substituted off) 45'
Substitutions:
GK	22	Ivan
DF	18	Bheu
FW	11	Melven
MF	17	Dario
FW	9	Melque	(substituted on) 62'
MF	20	Ailton
FW	10	Isac	(substituted on) 62'
DF	5	Feliciano
DF	3	Macaime
DF	15	Domingos	(substituted on) 89'
FW	8	Bonde	(substituted on) 45'
GK	1	Fazito
Coach:
(Mozambique) Chiquinho Conde

Man of the Match:
Gatoch Panom (Ethiopia)

Assistant referees:
Carine Atezambong (Cameroon)
Diana Chikotescha (Zambia)
Fourth official:
Mehrez Melki (Tunisia)

=== Mozambique vs Libya ===
17 January 2023
17:00

Mozambique	3–2	Libya
Melque 78'; Jone 80'; Lau Há King 85'	Report	Chico 23' (o.g.); Saltou 90+3'

Nelson Mandela Stadium, Algiers
Referee: Samuel Uwikunda (Rwanda)

Mozambique	Libya

Formation: 4–2–3–1
GK	12	Guambe
DF	4	Danilo	(yellow card) 43'	(substituted off) 55'
DF	13	Martinho
DF	14	Chico
DF	2	Infren
MF	23	Shaquille		(substituted off) 70'
MF	6	Amadou		(substituted off) 70'
FW	11	Melven		(substituted off) 55'
FW	8	Bonde		(substituted off) 55'
MF	7	Nelson
FW	10	Isac (c)
Substitutions:
MF	20	Ailton
MF	17	Dario		(substituted on) 70'
GK	1	Fazito
DF	18	Bheu		(substituted on) 55'
MF	16	Telinho
FW	9	Melque		(substituted on) 55'
DF	3	Macaime
DF	15	Domingos
FW	21	Kito
DF	5	Feliciano João Jone		(substituted on) 70'
GK	22	Ivan
FW	19	Lau King	(substituted on) 55'	(yellow card) 85'
Coach:
(Mozambique) Chiquinho Conde

Formation: 4–3–3
GK	1	Muad Allafi
DF	23	Muayid Jaddour	(yellow card) 82'
DF	14	Ali Ramadhan (c)
DF	8	Mansour Makkari
DF	15	Mahmoud Okashah		(substituted off) 83'
MF	6	Belkasim Rajab
MF	16	Suhaib Shafshuf
MF	17	Ali Arqoub		(substituted off) 78'
FW	10	Omar Al Khouja		(substituted off) 83'
FW	9	Saleh Taher Saeid		(substituted off) 68'
FW	13	Mohamed El-Munir		(substituted off) 69'
Substitutions:
FW	7	Ahmed Karwaa		(substituted on) 83'
MF	25	Mohammed Touhami
GK	12	Murad Al Woheshi
MF	21	Talal Farhat		(substituted on) 83'
FW	19	Muad Eisay		(substituted on) 78'
DF	3	Suliman Aboul Qassim
DF	4	Ali Almusrati
MF	18	Abdulati Abbasi		(substituted on) 69'
MF	24	Oussama Belaid
FW	20	Anis Saltou		(substituted on) 68'
GK	22	Muad Al Mansoori
DF	2	Anas Abd Alraheem
Coach:
(France) Corentin Martins

Man of the Match:
Melque (Mozambique)

Assistant referees:
Emery Niyongabo (Burundi)
Hamza Hagi Abdi (Somalia)
Fourth official:
Blaise Yuven Ngwa (Cameroon)

=== Algeria vs Ethiopia ===
17 January 2023
20:00

Algeria	1–0	Ethiopia
Mahious 52'	Report

Nelson Mandela Stadium, Algiers
Attendance: 34,987
Referee: Pierre Ghislain Atcho (Gabon)

Algeria	Ethiopia

Formation: 4–3–3
GK	16	Alexis Guendouz
DF	5	Ayoub Abdellaoui (c)	(substituted off) 70'
DF	2	Chouaib Keddad
DF	15	Zineddine Belaïd
DF	22	Mokhtar Belkhiter
MF	6	Ahmed Kendouci	(substituted off) 78'
MF	14	Houssem Eddine Mrezigue
MF	8	Zakaria Draoui
FW	21	Youcef Laouafi	(substituted off) 78'
FW	18	Aymen Mahious	(substituted off) 70'
FW	7	Abderrahmane Meziane	(substituted off) 90+4'
Substitutions:
FW	10	Féth-Allah Tahar
DF	19	Ayoub Ghezala	(substituted on) 70'
MF	11	Oussama Chita
DF	28	Houari Baouche	(substituted on) 78'
DF	24	Saâdi Radouani	(substituted on) 90+4'
FW	9	Karim Aribi
GK	1	Farid Chaâl
MF	27	Mohamed Ait El Hadj
FW	13	Mohamed Islam Belkhir	(substituted on) 78'
FW	12	Mohamed Islam Bakir
FW	20	Sofiane Bayazid	(substituted on) 70'
MF	4	Akram Djahnit
Coach:
(Algeria) Madjid Bougherra

Formation: 4–3–3
GK	23	Fasil Gerbremichael
DF	2	Suleman Hamid
DF	4	Mignot Debebe	(yellow card) 83'
DF	5	Million Solomon
DF	20	Ramadan Yusef
MF	19	Fuad Fereja		(substituted off) 46'
MF	6	Gatoch Panom	(yellow card) 75'
MF	3	Mesud Mohammed (c)		(substituted off) 57'
FW	8	Kenean Markneh
FW	11	Amanuel Gebremichael		(substituted off) 76'
FW	7	Chernet Gugesa		(substituted off) 57'
Substitutions:
FW	10	Beneyam Demte		(substituted on) 46'
MF	21	Alelegn Azene
DF	26	Bekele Berhane
MF	12	Yihun Endashew		(substituted on) 57'
FW	14	Duresa Shubisa		(substituted on) 76'
GK	22	Bahiru Negash
DF	13	Git Gatkut
FW	17	Kitika Jemma		(substituted on) 57'
DF	16	Fetudin Jemal
GK	1	Bereket Amare
DF	15	Aschalew Tamene
DF	24	Alembirhan Yigzaw
Coach:
(Ethiopia) Wubetu Abate

Man of the Match:
Abderrahmane Meziane (Algeria)

Assistant referees:
Ditsoga Boris Marlaise (Gabon)
Dos Reis Abelmiro Montenegro (São Tomé and Príncipe)
Fourth official:
Patrice Milazare (Mauritius)

=== Mozambique vs Algeria ===
21 January 2023
20:00

Mozambique	0–1	Algeria
	Report	Dehiri 7'

Nelson Mandela Stadium, Algiers
Attendance: 37,279
Referee: Mahmood Ali Ismail (Sudan)

Mozambique	Algeria

Formation: 4–3–3
GK	22	Ivan		(substituted off) 41'
DF	18	Bheu	(yellow card) 6'	(substituted off) 40'
DF	13	Martinho
DF	14	Chico
DF	15	Domingos
MF	23	Shaquille		(substituted off) 59'
DF	5	Feliciano João Jone
MF	6	Amadou		(substituted off) 60'
MF	16	Telinho (c)		(substituted off) 60'
FW	10	Isac
FW	9	Melque	(yellow card) 90+1'
Substitutions:
MF	20	Ailton
FW	19	Lau King		(substituted on) 59'
MF	17	Dario		(substituted on) 60'
FW	11	Melven
GK	12	Guambe
FW	21	Kito
MF	7	Nelson		(substituted on) 60'
FW	8	Bonde
DF	4	Danilo		(substituted on) 40'
DF	3	Macaime
GK	1	Fazito		(substituted on) 41'
DF	2	Infren
Coach:
(Mozambique) Chiquinho Conde			(yellow card) 73'

Formation: 4–3–3
GK	16	Alexis Guendouz
DF	2	Chouaib Keddad (c)	(yellow card) 45+6'
DF	19	Ayoub Ghezala
DF	3	Hocine Dehiri		(substituted off) 70'
DF	28	Houari Baouche
MF	11	Oussama Chita		(substituted off) 82'
MF	8	Zakaria Draoui
FW	13	Mohamed Islam Belkhir	(yellow card) 58'	(substituted off) 62'
DF	24	Saâdi Radouani
MF	4	Akram Djahnit		(substituted off) 62'
FW	9	Karim Aribi		(substituted off) 82'
Substitutions:
FW	7	Abderrahmane Meziane
DF	21	Youcef Laouafi
MF	14	Houssem Eddine Mrezigue	(substituted on) 82'	(yellow card) 90+5'
FW	20	Sofiane Bayazid
FW	17	Aimen Lahmeri		(substituted on) 62'
GK	23	Chamseddine Rahmani
FW	10	Féth-Allah Tahar
DF	26	Haithem Loucif
DF	15	Zineddine Belaïd		(substituted on) 70'
MF	27	Mohamed Ait El Hadj
FW	18	Aymen Mahious		(substituted on) 82'
FW	12	Mohamed Islam Bakir		(substituted on) 62'
Coach:
(Algeria) Madjid Bougherra

Man of the Match:
Saâdi Radouani (Algeria)

Assistant referees:
Kwasi Brobbey (Ghana)
Hamza Hagi Abdi (Somalia)
Fourth official:
Alhadi Allaou Mahamat (Chad)

=== Libya vs Ethiopia ===
21 January 2023
20:00

Libya	3–1	Ethiopia
Abu Arqoub 44'; Al-Abbasi 50'; Saltou 78'	Report	Panom 39' (pen.)

19 May 1956 Stadium, Annaba
Referee: Messie Nkounkou (Congo)

Libya	Ethiopia

Formation: 4–3–3
GK	1	Muad Allafi
DF	13	Mohamed El-Munir		(substituted off) 87'
DF	21	Talal Farhat
DF	14	Ali Ramadhan (c)
DF	24	Oussama Belaid
MF	17	Ali Arqoub
MF	25	Mohammed Touhami	(yellow card) 66'
MF	6	Belkasim Rajab
FW	18	Abdulati Abbasi		(substituted off) 87'
FW	20	Anis Saltou	(yellow card) 52'
FW	10	Omar Al Khouja
Substitutions:
FW	9	Saleh Taher Saeid
GK	12	Murad Al Woheshi
DF	2	Anas Abd Alraheem
DF	3	Suliman Aboul Qassim
MF	16	Suhaib Shafshuf		(substituted on) 87'
FW	19	Muad Eisay
DF	8	Mansour Makkari
MF	5	Mustafa Hamza
FW	11	Amer Muftah
DF	4	Ali Almusrati
GK	22	Muad Al Mansoori
DF	15	Mahmoud Okashah		(substituted on) 87'
Coach:
(France) Corentin Martins

Formation: 4–3–3
GK	23	Fasil Gerbremichael
DF	2	Suleman Hamid
DF	4	Mignot Debebe
DF	5	Million Solomon
DF	20	Ramadan Yusef
MF	3	Mesud Mohammed (c)		(substituted off) 46'
MF	6	Gatoch Panom	(yellow card) 59'
FW	10	Beneyam Demte
FW	11	Amanuel Gebremichael		(substituted off) 90+1'
FW	8	Kenean Markneh
FW	7	Chernet Gugesa		(substituted off) 46'
Substitutions:
DF	13	Git Gatkut
DF	16	Fetudin Jemal
GK	22	Bahiru Negash
DF	15	Aschalew Tamene
FW	17	Kitika Jemma		(substituted on) 90+1'
DF	26	Bekele Berhane
FW	9	Yigezu Bogale		(substituted on) 46'
MF	19	Fuad Fereja
FW	14	Duresa Shubisa		(substituted on) 46'
GK	1	Bereket Amare
MF	21	Alelegn Azene
MF	12	Yihun Endashew
Coach:
(Ethiopia) Wubetu Abate

Man of the Match:
Anis Saltou (Libya)

Assistant referees:
Hensley Petrousse (Seychelles)
Modibo Samake (Mali)
Fourth official:
Patrice Milazare (Mauritius)

== Discipline ==
Fair play points would have been used as tiebreakers if the overall and head-to-head records of teams were tied. These were calculated based on yellow and red cards received in all group matches as follows:

- first yellow card: −1 point;
- indirect red card (second yellow card): −3 points;
- direct red card: −4 points;
- yellow card and direct red card: −5 points;

Only one of the above deductions was applied to a player in a single match.

Team	Match 1				Match 2				Match 3				Points
Team	Booked	(yellow card) (yellow-red card)	Sent off (straight red)	(yellow card) (red card)	Booked	(yellow card) (yellow-red card)	Sent off (straight red)	(yellow card) (red card)	Booked	(yellow card) (yellow-red card)	Sent off (straight red)	(yellow card) (red card)	Points
Algeria	2								3				–5
Libya	2				1				2				–5
Ethiopia					2				1				–3
Mozambique					2				2				–4
