= 2022 African Nations Championship squads =

This article details the squads of all the participant nations of the 2022 African Nations Championship which was held in Algeria. A flag is included for coaches who are of a different nationality than their own national team. Players in cursive were registered as reserves.

== Group A ==
=== Algeria ===
Manager: Madjid Bougherra

The squad was announced on 2 January 2023 with 28 players.

No.	Pos.	Player	Date of birth (age)	Caps	Goals	Club
1	GK	Farid Chaâl	3 July 1994 (aged 28)	0	0	(Algerian Football Federation) MC Alger
16	GK	Alexis Guendouz	26 January 1996 (aged 26)	0	0	(Algerian Football Federation) CR Belouizdad
23	GK	Chamseddine Rahmani	15 September 1990 (aged 32)	1	0	(Algerian Football Federation) CS Constantine
2	DF	Chouaib Keddad	25 July 1994 (aged 28)	0	0	(Algerian Football Federation) CR Belouizdad
3	DF	Hocine Dehiri	16 September 2000 (aged 22)	0	0	(Algerian Football Federation) Paradou AC
5	DF	Ayoub Abdellaoui	16 February 1993 (aged 29)	9	0	(Algerian Football Federation) MC Alger
15	DF	Zineddine Belaïd	20 March 1999 (aged 23)	0	0	(Algerian Football Federation) USM Alger
19	DF	Ayoub Ghezala	6 December 1995 (aged 27)	0	0	(Algerian Football Federation) USM Alger
21	DF	Youcef Laouafi	1 March 1996 (aged 26)	0	0	(Algerian Football Federation) CR Belouizdad
22	DF	Mokhtar Belkhiter	15 January 1992 (aged 30)	3	0	(Algerian Football Federation) CR Belouizdad
24	DF	Saâdi Radouani	18 March 1995 (aged 27)	0	0	(Algerian Football Federation) USM Alger
26	DF	Haithem Loucif	8 July 1996 (aged 26)	2	0	(Algerian Football Federation) USM Alger
28	DF	Houari Baouche	24 December 1995 (aged 27)	0	0	(Algerian Football Federation) USM Alger
4	MF	Akram Djahnit	3 April 1991 (aged 31)	0	0	(Algerian Football Federation) USM Alger
6	MF	Ahmed Kendouci	22 June 1999 (aged 23)	0	0	(Algerian Football Federation) ES Sétif
8	MF	Zakaria Draoui	20 February 1994 (aged 28)	6	0	(Algerian Football Federation) CR Belouizdad
11	MF	Oussama Chita	31 October 1996 (aged 26)	2	0	(Algerian Football Federation) USM Alger
12	MF	Mohamed Islam Bakir	13 July 1996 (aged 26)	0	0	(Algerian Football Federation) CR Belouizdad
14	MF	Houssem Eddine Mrezigue	23 March 2000 (aged 22)	4	0	(Algerian Football Federation) CR Belouizdad
25	MF	Chouaib Debbih	1 January 1993 (age 33)	0	0	(Algerian Football Federation) MC Alger
27	MF	Mohamed Ait El Hadj	22 March 2002 (aged 20)	0	0	(Algerian Football Federation) USM Alger
7	FW	Abderrahmane Meziane	7 March 1994 (aged 28)	1	0	(Algerian Football Federation) USM Alger
9	FW	Karim Aribi	24 June 1994 (aged 28)	2	0	(Algerian Football Federation) CR Belouizdad
10	FW	Féth-Allah Tahar	22 January 1994 (aged 28)	0	0	(Algerian Football Federation) MC Alger
13	FW	Mohamed Islam Belkhir	16 March 2001 (aged 21)	0	0	(Algerian Football Federation) CR Belouizdad
17	FW	Aimen Lahmeri	28 May 1996 (aged 26)	0	0	(Algerian Football Federation) JS Saoura
18	FW	Aymen Mahious	15 September 1997 (aged 25)	0	0	(Algerian Football Federation) USM Alger
20	FW	Sofiane Bayazid	16 November 1996 (aged 26)	0	0	(Algerian Football Federation) USM Khenchela

=== Libya ===
Manager: (France) Corentin Martins

No.	Pos.	Player	Date of birth (age)	Caps	Goals	Club
1	GK	Muad Allafi	15 May 2000 (aged 22)	8	0	(Libyan Football Federation) Al-Ittihad
12	GK	Murad Al-Wuheeshi	28 February 1997 (aged 25)	5	0	(Libyan Football Federation) Al-Ahly Benghazi
22	GK	Mouad Al-Mansouri	29 August 1993 (aged 29)	0	0	(Libyan Football Federation) Abu Salim
26	GK	Miftah Al-Taeb	30 January 1996 (aged 26)	1	0	(Libyan Football Federation) Al Akhdar
2	DF	Anas Al-Werfalli	4 April 1993 (aged 29)	1	0	(Libyan Football Federation) Al Akhdar
3	DF	Wajdi Said	1 August 1991 (aged 31)	0	0	(Libyan Football Federation) Al Akhdar
4	DF	Ali Youssef	9 July 2001 (aged 21)	2	0	(Libyan Football Federation) Al-Ahly Benghazi
5	DF	Mustafa Hamza	27 September 1992 (aged 30)	2	0	(Libyan Football Federation) Al Akhdar
8	DF	Mansour Makkari	19 October 1992 (aged 30)	5	0	(Libyan Football Federation) Al-Ahli Tripoli
13	DF	Mohamed El-Munir	8 April 1992 (aged 30)	30	4	(Libyan Football Federation) Al-Ahli Tripoli
14	DF	Ali Salama	18 September 1987 (aged 35)	42	1	(Libyan Football Federation) Al-Nasr Benghazi
15	DF	Mahmoud Akasha	6 March 1992 (aged 30)	4	0	(Libyan Football Federation) Al-Ahli Tripoli
6	MF	Abouqassim Rajab	3 September 1999 (aged 23)	5	1	(Libyan Football Federation) Al Ittihad Misurata
10	MF	Omar Al Khouja	1 March 2000 (aged 22)	13	2	(Libyan Football Federation) Al-Ittihad
16	MF	Suhaib Shafshuf	19 January 1991 (aged 31)	7	0	(Libyan Football Federation) Al Akhdar
17	MF	Ali Abu Arqoub	24 April 1992 (aged 30)	0	0	(Libyan Football Federation) Al-Ahli Tripoli
23	MF	Muayid Jaddour	14 February 2001 (aged 21)	2	0	(Libyan Football Federation) Al-Ahli Tripoli
24	MF	Osama Belaid	28 November 1998 (aged 24)	0	0	(Libyan Football Federation) Al-Hilal
25	MF	Mohammed Al Tuhami	31 May 1992 (aged 30)	14	0	(Libyan Football Federation) Al-Ittihad
7	FW	Ahmed Kraouaa	21 April 1989 (aged 33)	4	1	(Libyan Football Federation) Al-Ahly Benghazi
9	FW	Saleh Al-Taher	1 January 1992 (aged 31)	18	4	(Libyan Football Federation) Al-Ahli Tripoli
11	FW	Amer Al Tawergi	8 January 1992 (aged 31)	4	0	(Libyan Football Federation) Al Akhdar
18	FW	Abdulati Al Abasi	23 October 1994 (aged 28)	2	0	(Libyan Football Federation) Al-Ittihad]
19	FW	Mouad Eissa	8 May 1999 (aged 23)	11	0	(Libyan Football Federation) Al-Ittihad
20	FW	Mohamed Anis Saltou	1 April 1992 (aged 30)	23	5	(Libyan Football Federation) Al-Ahli Tripoli
21	FW	Jaafar Ejbouda	16 May 1997 (aged 25)	0	0	(Libyan Football Federation) Olympic Azzaweya

=== Ethiopia ===
Manager: Wubetu Abate

No.	Pos.	Player	Date of birth (age)	Caps	Goals	Club
1	GK	Bereket Amare	25 April 1999 (aged 23)	1	0	(Ethiopian Football Federation) Ethiopian Coffee
22	GK	Bahiru Negash	24 December 1994 (aged 28)	0	0	(Ethiopian Football Federation) Saint George
23	GK	Fasil Gerbremichael	15 October 1999 (aged 23)	10	0	(Ethiopian Football Federation) Bahir Dar Kenema
2	DF	Suleman Hamid	20 October 1997 (aged 25)	16	0	(Ethiopian Football Federation) Saint George
4	DF	Mignot Debebe	2 September 1995 (aged 27)	10	0	(Ethiopian Football Federation) Saint George
5	DF	Million Solomon	13 April 1997 (aged 25)	1	0	(Ethiopian Football Federation) Adama City
13	DF	Git Gatkut	20 May 1998 (aged 24)	1	0	(Ethiopian Football Federation) Sidama Coffee
15	DF	Aschalew Tamene	22 November 1991 (aged 31)	64	3	(Ethiopian Football Federation) Fasil Kenema
16	DF	Fetudin Jemal	17 December 1994 (aged 28)	0	0	(Ethiopian Football Federation) Bahir Dar Kenema
20	DF	Ramadan Yusef	12 February 2001 (aged 21)	26	0	(Ethiopian Football Federation) Saint George
24	DF	Alembirhan Yigzaw	3 January 2001 (aged 22)	0	0	(Ethiopian Football Federation) Fasil Kenema
25	DF	Gezahegn Desalegn	3 January 2001 (aged 22)	0	0	(Ethiopian Football Federation) Ethiopian Coffee
26	DF	Berhane Bekele	19 December 2002 (aged 20)	2	1	(Ethiopian Football Federation) Hadiya Hossana
3	MF	Mesud Mohammed	18 February 1990 (aged 32)	29	3	(Ethiopian Football Federation) Adama City
6	MF	Gatoch Panom	12 June 1994 (aged 28)	46	7	(Ethiopian Football Federation) Saint George
8	MF	Kenean Markneh	30 March 1998 (aged 24)	3	0	(Ethiopian Football Federation) Defence Force
10	MF	Beneyam Demte	18 July 1998 (aged 24)	21	0	(Ethiopian Football Federation) Saint George
12	MF	Yihun Endashew	22 January 1995 (aged 27)	17	0	(Ethiopian Football Federation) Fasil Kenema
18	MF	Wondmageng Hailu	28 December 2002 (aged 20)	1	0	(Ethiopian Football Federation) Hawassa City
21	MF	Alelign Azene	10 January 1998 (aged 25)	0	0	(Ethiopian Football Federation) Bahir Dar Kenema
7	FW	Chernet Gugesa	13 September 1999 (aged 23)	6	0	(Ethiopian Football Federation) Saint George
9	FW	Yigezu Bogale	1 January 2001 (aged 22)	3	1	(Ethiopian Football Federation) Sidama Coffee
11	FW	Amanuel Gebremichael	5 February 1999 (aged 23)	33	6	(Ethiopian Football Federation) Saint George
14	FW	Duresa Shubisa	13 January 2003 (aged 20)	0	0	(Ethiopian Football Federation) Bahir Dar Kenema
17	FW	Kitika Jima	27 August 2000 (aged 22)	0	0	(Ethiopian Football Federation) Bahir Dar Kenema
19	FW	Fuad Fereje	27 May 2000 (aged 22)	2	0	(Ethiopian Football Federation) Adama City

=== Mozambique ===
Manager: Chiquinho Conde

No.	Pos.	Player	Date of birth (age)	Caps	Goals	Club
1	GK	Fazito	9 June 2003 (aged 19)	0	0	(Mozambican Football Federation) Ferroviário Nampula
12	GK	Víctor Guambe	8 October 1998 (aged 24)	10	0	(Mozambican Football Federation) Costa do Sol
22	GK	Ivane Urrubal	1 March 1997 (aged 25)	1	0	(Mozambican Football Federation) Black Bulls
31	GK	Ernan Siluane	9 July 1998 (aged 24)	0	0	(Mozambican Football Federation) Songo
2	DF	Nanani	8 February 1996 (aged 26)	6	0	(Mozambican Football Federation) Songo
3	DF	Macaime	7 June 1998 (aged 24)	0	0	(Mozambican Football Federation) Songo
4	DF	Danilo	18 April 1997 (aged 25)	17	0	(Mozambican Football Federation) Costa do Sol
5	DF	Nené	15 November 1996 (aged 26)	0	0	(Mozambican Football Federation) Black Bulls
13	DF	Martinho	27 September 1999 (aged 23)	14	1	(Mozambican Football Federation) Black Bulls
14	DF	Chico	5 November 1991 (aged 31)	32	0	(Mozambican Football Federation) Costa do Sol
15	DF	Domingos Macandza	17 June 1998 (aged 24)	0	0	(Mozambican Football Federation) Costa do Sol
18	DF	Bheu Januário	11 August 1993 (aged 29)	0	0	(Mozambican Football Federation) Songo
6	MF	Amadú	3 December 1996 (aged 26)	5	0	(Mozambican Football Federation) UD Songo
8	MF	João Bonde	9 January 1997 (aged 26)	0	0	(Mozambican Football Federation) Ferroviário da Beira
17	MF	Dário	20 January 1996 (aged 26)	0	0	(Mozambican Football Federation) UD Songo
20	FW	Yude	19 June 1997 (age 29)	0	0	(Mozambican Football Federation) Ferroviário de Maputo
21	MF	Kito	25 May 1988 (age 38)	0	0	(Mozambican Football Federation) Ferroviário de Maputo
23	MF	Shaquille	24 November 1997 (aged 25)	15	0	(Mozambican Football Federation) Ferroviário de Maputo
7	FW	Nelson Divrassone	20 June 1994 (aged 28)	1	1	(Mozambican Football Federation) Songo
9	FW	Melque	26 June 1997 (age 29)	11	3	(Mozambican Football Federation) Black Bulls
10	FW	Isac Carvalho	26 July 1989 (aged 33)	23	4	(Mozambican Football Federation) Ferroviário Nampula
11	FW	Melven Choi	15 October 2001 (aged 21)	1	0	(Mozambican Football Federation) Ferroviário Beira
16	FW	Telinho	15 October 1988 (aged 34)	46	3	(Mozambican Football Federation) Costa do Sol
19	FW	Lau King	4 September 1995 (age 31)	5	0	(Mozambican Football Federation) Songo
33	FW	Dayo António	20 August 1988 (aged 34)	0	0	(Mozambican Football Federation) Songo

== Group B ==
=== DR Congo ===
Manager: Otis Ngoma

No.	Pos.	Player	Date of birth (age)	Caps	Goals	Club
1	GK	Hervé Lomboto	27 October 1989 (aged 33)	6	0	(Congolese Association Football Federation) DC Motema Pembe
16	GK	Baggio Siadi	21 July 1997 (aged 25)	4	0	(Congolese Association Football Federation) TP Mazembe
23	GK	Yves Mukawa	19 July 2000 (aged 22)	0	0	(Congolese Association Football Federation) FC Saint-Éloi Lupopo
2	DF	Issama Mpeko	30 April 1989 (aged 33)	76	1	(Congolese Association Football Federation) TP Mazembe
3	DF	Chadrack Issaka Boka	20 November 1999 (aged 23)	0	0	(Congolese Association Football Federation) FC Saint-Éloi Lupopo
4	DF	Guy Magema	24 January 1996 (aged 26)	0	0	(Congolese Association Football Federation) AS Vita Club
5	DF	Ikoyo Iyembe	18 August 1993 (aged 29)	0	0	(Congolese Association Football Federation) FC Saint-Éloi Lupopo
12	DF	Ernest Luzolo	4 January 1997 (aged 26)	11	0	(Congolese Association Football Federation) TP Mazembe
14	DF	Patou Simbi Ebunga	26 August 1983 (aged 39)	19	2	(Congolese Association Football Federation) AS Vita Club
18	DF	Kévin Mondeko	10 September 1995 (aged 27)	3	0	(Congolese Association Football Federation) TP Mazembe
25	DF	Kalaba Mukeka	23 January 1999 (aged 23)	1	0	(Congolese Association Football Federation) US Tshinkunku
28	DF	Arnold Mavungu	17 April 2001 (aged 21)	0	0	(Congolese Association Football Federation) Blessing FC
6	MF	Peter Zilu Mutumosi	25 May 1998 (aged 24)	0	0	(Congolese Association Football Federation) AS Vita Club
8	MF	Merveille Kikasa	14 February 1999 (aged 23)	3	1	(Congolese Association Football Federation) AS Vita Club
13	MF	Onoya Sangana	6 September 2003 (aged 19)	0	0	(Congolese Association Football Federation) AS Maniema Union
21	MF	Maxi Nzengeli	30 January 2000 (aged 22)	0	0	(Congolese Association Football Federation) AS Maniema Union
22	MF	Mira Kalonji	15 March 1999 (aged 23)	0	0	(Congolese Association Football Federation) FC Renaissance
24	MF	Soze Zemanga	7 November 1999 (aged 23)	0	0	(Congolese Association Football Federation) TP Mazembe
27	MF	Miché Mika	11 September 1996 (aged 26)	11	0	(Congolese Association Football Federation) FC Saint-Éloi Lupopo
7	FW	Phillippe Kinzumbi	30 June 1997 (aged 25)	1	1	(Congolese Association Football Federation) TP Mazembe
9	FW	Jean-Marc Makusu	27 March 1992 (aged 30)	8	4	(Congolese Association Football Federation) FC Saint-Éloi Lupopo
10	FW	Elie Mpanzu	January 2002 (aged 20–21)	0	0	(Congolese Association Football Federation) AS Vita Club
11	FW	Jonathan Ikangalombo	5 April 2002 (aged 20)	0	0	(Congolese Association Football Federation) DC Motema Pembe
15	FW	Obed Mayamba	24 September 1994 (aged 28)	0	0	(Congolese Association Football Federation) AS Maniema Union
17	FW	Emmanuel Bola Lobota	25 December 1999 (aged 23)	1	0	(Congolese Association Football Federation) FC Saint-Éloi Lupopo
19	FW	Adam Bossu	16 November 1999 (aged 23)	0	0	(Congolese Association Football Federation) TP Mazembe
20	FW	Éric Kabwe	5 May 2001 (aged 21)	0	0	(Congolese Association Football Federation) AS Vita Club
26	FW	Boeny Fortuna	1 May 1998 (aged 24)	0	0	(Congolese Association Football Federation) AC Rangers

=== Ivory Coast ===
Manager: Souhalio Haïdara

No.	Pos.	Player	Date of birth (age)	Caps	Goals	Club
1	GK	Charles Folly Ayayi	29 December 1990 (aged 32)	0	0	(Ivorian Football Federation) ASEC Mimosas
16	GK	Alimi Amine Diakité	26 February 2003 (aged 19)	0	0	(Ivorian Football Federation) ASEC Mimosas
23	GK	Drissa Bamba	10 December 1993 (aged 29)	0	0	(Ivorian Football Federation) Stade d'Abidjan
2	DF	Kouassi Attohoula	20 December 1996 (aged 26)	0	0	(Ivorian Football Federation) ASEC Mimosas
4	DF	Marc Goua	2 November 1989 (aged 33)	11	0	(Ivorian Football Federation) Gagnoa
5	DF	Issif Traore	24 December 1985 (aged 37)	0	0	(Ivorian Football Federation) Gagnoa
12	DF	Souleymane Coulibaly	26 December 2001 (aged 21)	0	0	(Ivorian Football Federation) ASEC Mimosas
17	DF	Ande Cirille	25 December 1998 (aged 24)	0	0	(Ivorian Football Federation) LYS Sassandra
18	DF	Serge Badjo	28 December 2002 (aged 20)	0	0	(Ivorian Football Federation) Sol FC
21	DF	Abdoul Aziz Siahoune	10 April 1994 (aged 28)	0	0	(Ivorian Football Federation) LYS Sassandra
25	DF	Moise Gbai	5 June 1999 (aged 23)	0	0	(Ivorian Football Federation) Sol FC
3	MF	Alpha Sidibé	3 November 2004 (aged 18)	0	0	(Ivorian Football Federation) San Pédro
6	MF	Zougrana Mohamed	29 October 2001 (aged 21)	0	0	(Ivorian Football Federation) ASEC Mimosas
8	MF	Pacôme Zouzoua	30 April 1997 (aged 25)	1	0	(Ivorian Football Federation) ASEC Mimosas
10	MF	Anicet Oura	7 December 1999 (aged 23)	0	0	(Ivorian Football Federation) ASEC Mimosas
13	MF	Semelo Gueï	28 December 2000 (aged 22)	0	0	(Ivorian Football Federation) AFAD Djékanou
14	MF	Aubin Kramo	28 February 1996 (aged 26)	0	0	(Ivorian Football Federation) ASEC Mimosas
15	MF	Constant Wayou	20 December 1996 (aged 26)	0	0	(Ivorian Football Federation) San Pédro
19	MF	Essis Baudelaire Aka	10 January 1990 (aged 33)	1	0	(Ivorian Football Federation) ASEC Mimosas
22	MF	Salifou Diarrassouba	20 December 2001 (aged 21)	0	0	(Ivorian Football Federation) ASEC Mimosas
7	FW	Mohamed Sylla	12 November 2001 (aged 21)	0	0	(Ivorian Football Federation) RC Abidjan
9	FW	Sankara Karamoko	9 November 2003 (aged 19)	0	0	(Ivorian Football Federation) ASEC Mimosas
11	FW	Abdramane Konaté	25 June 2006 (aged 16)	0	0	(Ivorian Football Federation) San Pédro
20	FW	Patrick Ouotro	13 September 2005 (aged 17)	0	0	(Ivorian Football Federation) LYS Sassandra
24	FW	Romaric Dognimin Ouattara	14 October 2004 (aged 18)	0	0	(Ivorian Football Federation) Stade d'Abidjan

=== Senegal ===
Manager: Pape Thiaw

No.	Pos.	Player	Date of birth (age)	Caps	Goals	Club
1	GK	Pape Dieng	November 10, 1994 (aged 28)	0	0	(Senegalese Football Federation) AS Dakar Sacré-Cœur
16	GK	Alioune Badara Faty	May 3, 1999 (aged 23)	0	0	(Senegalese Football Federation) Casa Sports
23	GK	Pape Sy	May 2, 1997 (aged 25)	0	0	(Senegalese Football Federation) Génération Foot
2	DF	Abdoulaye Diédhiou	July 12, 2000 (aged 22)	0	0	(Senegalese Football Federation) Casa Sports
3	DF	Ousmane Diouf	April 26, 1997 (aged 25)	0	0	(Senegalese Football Federation) Teungueth FC
4	DF	Mamadou Sané	December 31, 2004 (aged 18)	0	0	(Senegalese Football Federation) Guédiawaye FC
8	DF	Moussa Sogué	January 23, 2001 (aged 21)	0	0	(Senegalese Football Federation) US Gorée
12	DF	Cheikh Sidibé	April 25, 1999 (aged 23)	0	0	(Senegalese Football Federation) Teungueth FC
15	DF	Mélo Ndiaye	November 23, 1994 (aged 28)	6	0	(Senegalese Football Federation) ASC Jaraaf
18	DF	Moutarou Baldé	October 5, 1993 (aged 29)	5	0	(Senegalese Football Federation) Teungueth FC
22	DF	Cheikhou N'Diaye	January 25, 2002 (aged 20)	0	0	(Senegalese Football Federation) Génération Foot
5	MF	Lamine Camara	January 1, 2004 (aged 19)	0	0	(Senegalese Football Federation) Génération Foot
6	MF	Ousmane Kane	June 23, 2001 (aged 21)	0	0	(Senegalese Football Federation) Douanes
10	MF	Papa Amadou Diallo	June 25, 2004 (aged 18)	0	0	(Senegalese Football Federation) Génération Foot
11	MF	Malick Mbaye	April 6, 2004 (aged 18)	0	0	(Senegalese Football Federation) Génération Foot
13	MF	Libasse Ngom	December 4, 2003 (aged 19)	0	0	(Senegalese Football Federation) Guédiawaye FC
14	MF	Moussa N'Diaye	February 23, 2004 (aged 18)	6	0	(Senegalese Football Federation) ASC Jaraaf
19	MF	Djibril Diarra	April 30, 2004 (aged 18)	0	0	(Senegalese Football Federation) Génération Foot
20	MF	Elimane Cissé	March 12, 1995 (aged 27)	5	0	(Senegalese Football Federation) Diambars FC
7	FW	Cheikh Diouf	December 17, 2003 (aged 19)	0	0	(Senegalese Football Federation) Guédiawaye FC
9	FW	Raymond Diémé Ndour	February 12, 2001 (aged 21)	0	0	(Senegalese Football Federation) Casa Sports
17	FW	Serigne Koïté	February 1, 1996 (aged 26)	0	0	(Senegalese Football Federation) Teungueth FC
21	FW	Moussa Kanté	May 8, 2004 (aged 18)	0	0	(Senegalese Football Federation) AS Dakar Sacré-Cœur

=== Uganda ===
Manager: (Serbia) Milutin Sredojević

No.	Pos.	Player	Date of birth (age)	Caps	Goals	Club
1	GK	Nafian Alionzi	2 March 1996 (aged 26)	1	0	(Federation of Uganda Football Associations) URA SC
18	GK	Joel Mutakubwa	17 July 1994 (aged 28)	2	0	(Federation of Uganda Football Associations) Gaddafi FC
19	GK	Jack Komakech	31 July 2002 (aged 20)	0	0	(Federation of Uganda Football Associations) Vipers SC
2	DF	James Penz Begisa	27 September 2002 (aged 20)	0	0	(Federation of Uganda Football Associations) URA SC
4	DF	Kenneth Semakula	14 November 2002 (aged 20)	2	0	(Federation of Uganda Football Associations) SC Villa
5	DF	Hilary Mukundane	22 December 1997 (aged 25)	2	0	(Federation of Uganda Football Associations) Vipers SC
12	DF	Isa Mubiru	10 October 1996 (aged 26)	0	0	(Federation of Uganda Football Associations) Vipers SC
17	DF	Fred Gift	21 July 1998 (aged 24)	0	0	(Federation of Uganda Football Associations) SC Villa
20	DF	Ashraf Mandela	20 December 1998 (aged 24)	0	0	(Federation of Uganda Football Associations) Vipers SC
21	DF	Derrick Ndahiro	6 January 1998 (aged 25)	2	0	(Federation of Uganda Football Associations) URA SC
24	DF	Geoffrey Wasswa	23 August 1996 (aged 26)	0	0	(Federation of Uganda Football Associations) KCCA FC
6	MF	Siraje Sentamu	7 June 1995 (aged 27)	0	0	(Federation of Uganda Football Associations) Vipers SC
10	MF	Travis Mutyaba	7 August 2005 (aged 17)	3	0	(Federation of Uganda Football Associations) SC Villa
14	MF	Bright Anukani	26 June 2000 (aged 22)	14	3	(Federation of Uganda Football Associations) Vipers SC
15	MF	Marvin Youngman	5 May 1998 (aged 24)	3	0	(Federation of Uganda Football Associations) Vipers SC
16	MF	Moses Aliro	7 June 1995 (aged 27)	0	0	(Federation of Uganda Football Associations) Wakiso Giants FC
22	MF	Titus Ssematimba	15 August 2003 (aged 19)	2	0	(Federation of Uganda Football Associations) Wakiso Giants FC
23	MF	Moses Waiswa	20 April 1997 (aged 25)	23	1	(Federation of Uganda Football Associations) KCCA FC
25	MF	Karim Watambala	3 March 2000 (aged 22)	7	0	(Federation of Uganda Football Associations) Vipers SC
3	FW	Najib Yiga	18 December 2002 (aged 20)	0	0	(Federation of Uganda Football Associations) Vipers SC
7	FW	Rogers Mato	10 October 2003 (aged 19)	6	0	(Federation of Uganda Football Associations) KCCA FC
8	FW	Nelson Senkatuka	10 September 1997 (aged 25)	11	1	(Federation of Uganda Football Associations) Bright Stars FC
9	FW	Frank Ssebufu	9 September 2001 (aged 21)	0	0	(Federation of Uganda Football Associations) Wakiso Giants FC
11	FW	Ibrahim Orit	28 July 1998 (aged 24)	11	2	(Federation of Uganda Football Associations) Vipers SC
13	FW	Milton Karisa	27 July 1995 (aged 27)	38	5	(Federation of Uganda Football Associations) Vipers SC

== Group C ==
=== Morocco ===
Morocco was originally set to take part in the tournament with their under-23 national team after their football federation disbanded their official CHAN team on 31 August 2022. However, they announced their withdrawal a day before the tournament began.

=== Sudan ===
Manager: Burhan Tia

No.	Pos.	Player	Date of birth (age)	Caps	Goals	Club
1	GK	Ali Abu Eshrein	6 December 1989 (aged 33)	32	0	(Sudan Football Association) Al-Hilal Club
16	GK	Mohamed Mustafa	19 February 1996 (aged 26)	12	0	(Sudan Football Association) Al-Merrikh SC
21	GK	Muhamed Kedyaba	23 June 1990 (aged 32)	4	0	(Sudan Football Association) Hilal Alsahil SC
30	GK	Abdallah Adam	5 July 1991 (aged 31)	0	0	(Sudan Football Association) Al Ahli Merowe
2	DF	Ahmed Bibo	1 January 1994 (aged 29)	15	0	(Sudan Football Association) Al-Merrikh SC
3	DF	Elsadig Hassan	4 September 1996 (aged 26)	6	0	(Sudan Football Association) Al Ahli SC
4	DF	Amjad Ismail	1 January 1993 (aged 30)	7	0	(Sudan Football Association) Al-Ahly Shendi
5	DF	Hamza Dawoud	2 October 1994 (aged 28)	18	0	(Sudan Football Association) Al-Merrikh SC
12	DF	Mustafa Karshoum	6 December 1992 (aged 30)	15	0	(Sudan Football Association) Al-Merrikh SC
13	DF	Awad Zayed	1 January 1993 (aged 30)	5	0	(Sudan Football Association) Al Ahli SC (Khartoum)
19	DF	Salah Nemer (Captain)	5 February 1992 (aged 30)	24	0	(Sudan Football Association) Al-Merrikh SC
20	DF	Muwafaq Sedig	1 May 1997 (aged 25)	1	0	(Sudan Football Association) Al-Hilal Club
23	DF	Mazin Mohamedein	2 May 2000 (aged 22)	14	0	(Sudan Football Association) Al-Merrikh SC
25	DF	Moaiad Abdeen	21 May 1996 (aged 26)	4	0	(Sudan Football Association) Alamal SC Atbara
8	MF	Abdel Raouf	18 July 1993 (aged 29)	17	1	(Sudan Football Association) Al-Hilal Club
14	MF	Musab Kurduman	4 April 2000 (aged 22)	0	0	(Sudan Football Association) Al-Ahly Shendi
15	MF	Alsamani Alsawi	31 October 1991 (aged 31)	11	3	(Sudan Football Association) Al-Merrikh SC
17	MF	Salah Adel	3 April 1995 (aged 27)	13	0	(Sudan Football Association) Al-Hilal Club
18	MF	Alfateh Jadin	25 February 1994 (aged 28)	2	0	(Sudan Football Association) Hay Al-Arab SC
22	MF	Walieldin Khedr	15 September 1995 (aged 27)	32	1	(Sudan Football Association) Al-Hilal Club
24	MF	Ali Abdalah	17 March 2003 (aged 19)	0	0	(Sudan Football Association) Hay Al Wadi SC
28	MF	Ammar Taifour	12 April 1997 (aged 25)	7	0	(Sudan Football Association) Al-Merrikh SC
6	FW	Al-Jezoli Nouh	24 October 2002 (aged 20)	16	1	(Sudan Football Association) Al-Merrikh SC
7	FW	Sedig Kuwa	1 January 2000 (aged 23)	4	1	(Sudan Football Association) Hay Al-Arab SC
9	FW	Yaser Muzmel	1 January 1992 (aged 31)	33	5	(Sudan Football Association) Al-Hilal Club
10	FW	Mohamed Abdelrahman	10 July 1993 (aged 29)	37	19	(Sudan Football Association) Al-Hilal Club
11	FW	Waleed Al-Shoala	11 November 1998 (aged 24)	20	3	(Sudan Football Association) Al-Hilal Club
26	FW	Ayman Abdelrahman	1 January 1994 (aged 29)	0	0	(Sudan Football Association) Al Ahli SC

=== Madagascar ===
Manager: Romuald Rakotondrabe

No.	Pos.	Player	Date of birth (age)	Caps	Goals	Club
1	GK	Andoniaina Andriamalala	8 March 1985 (aged 37)	4	0	(Malagasy Football Federation) CNaPS Sport
16	GK	Razakanirina Rakotohasimbola	14 October 1999 (aged 23)	0	0	(Malagasy Football Federation) ASSM Elgeco Plus
23	GK	Andrianirina Rajomazandry	9 March 1994 (aged 28)	0	0	(Malagasy Football Federation) CFF Andoharanofotsy
2	DF	Soloniaina Avizara	28 February 2000 (aged 22)	0	0	(Malagasy Football Federation) Fosa Juniors FC
3	DF	Tantely Randrianiaina	13 February 1989 (aged 33)	18	0	(Malagasy Football Federation) CNaPS Sport
4	DF	Stéphano Randrianisondrotra	3 June 2002 (aged 20)	0	0	(Malagasy Football Federation) AS Adema
5	DF	Rajo Razafindrabe	23 March 1997 (aged 25)	6	0	(Malagasy Football Federation) JET Kintana
14	DF	Jean Martin Rakotonirina	1 June 1991 (aged 31)	0	0	(Malagasy Football Federation) ASSM Elgeco Plus
22	DF	Ando Rakotondrazaka	25 September 1987 (aged 35)	22	0	(Malagasy Football Federation) CNaPS Sport
24	DF	Rado Andrianinosy	18 August 1996 (aged 26)	0	0	(Malagasy Football Federation) Fosa Juniors FC
6	MF	Rojo Andriamanjato	11 August 1992 (aged 30)	7	1	(Malagasy Football Federation) Ajesaia
8	MF	Lalaina Rafanomezantsoa	10 March 1998 (aged 24)	0	0	(Malagasy Football Federation) CFF Andoharanofotsy
10	MF	Arohasina Andrianarimanana	21 April 1991 (aged 31)	24	1	(Malagasy Football Federation) Fosa Juniors FC
13	MF	Tsiry Randriatsiferana	5 August 1996 (aged 26)	0	0	(Malagasy Football Federation) Fosa Juniors FC
15	MF	Pierre Michael Tiavina Rakotoarisoa	27 March 1996 (aged 26)	0	0	(Malagasy Football Federation) Fosa Juniors FC
17	MF	Tantely Avotraniaina Rabarijaona	17 February 1995 (aged 27)	0	0	(Malagasy Football Federation) CFF Andoharanofotsy
18	MF	Tony Randriamanampisoa	17 July 1994 (aged 28)	0	0	(Malagasy Football Federation) ASSM Elgeco Plus
19	MF	Tendry Manovo Randrianarijaona	19 March 1998 (aged 24)	0	0	(Malagasy Football Federation) FC Ihosy
21	MF	Doddy	8 June 1995 (aged 27)	5	0	(Malagasy Football Federation) ASSM Elgeco Plus
7	FW	Koloina Razafindranaivo	25 March 2000 (aged 22)	0	0	(Malagasy Football Federation) CFF Andoharanofotsy
9	FW	Feldman Rakotobearimalala	7 April 1994 (aged 28)	0	0	(Malagasy Football Federation) USCA Foot
11	FW	Onjaniaina Patrick Hasinirina	30 March 1995 (aged 27)	0	0	(Malagasy Football Federation) ASSM Elgeco Plus
12	FW	Marcio Ravelomanantsoa	15 October 1996 (aged 26)	6	0	(Malagasy Football Federation) JET Kintana
20	FW	Jean Yves Razafindrakoto	16 August 1997 (aged 25)	2	0	(Malagasy Football Federation) Fosa Juniors FC

=== Ghana ===
Manager: Annor Walker

The squad was announced on Christmas Day (25 December) 2022.

No.	Pos.	Player	Date of birth (age)	Caps	Goals	Club
1	GK	Stephen Kwaku	4 October 1993 (aged 29)	0	0	(Ghana Football Association) Great Olympics
16	GK	Ibrahim Danlad	2 December 2002 (aged 20)	4	0	(Ghana Football Association) Asante Kotoko
22	GK	William Essu	9 May 2002 (aged 20)	0	0	(Ghana Football Association) Legon Cities
2	DF	Augustine Randolf	26 March 2001 (aged 21)	0	0	(Ghana Football Association) Karela United
3	DF	Benjamin Abaidoo	11 January 1997 (aged 26)	0	0	(Ghana Football Association) Medeama
4	DF	Solomon Adomako	30 November 2001 (aged 21)	0	0	(Ghana Football Association) Great Olympics
5	DF	Konadu Yiadom	10 June 2000 (aged 22)	1	0	(Ghana Football Association) Hearts of Oak
9	DF	Dennis Nkrumah-Korsah	25 February 1996 (aged 26)	4	0	(Ghana Football Association) Hearts of Oak
12	DF	Augustine Agyapong	21 January 2004 (aged 18)	0	0	(Ghana Football Association) Asante Kotoko
14	DF	Sherif Mohammed	25 June 2002 (aged 20)	0	0	(Ghana Football Association) Asante Kotoko
15	DF	Henry Ansu	17 December 1998 (aged 24)	0	0	(Ghana Football Association) Berekum Chelsea
21	DF	Razak Kasim	5 June 1994 (aged 28)	0	0	(Ghana Football Association) Great Olympics
25	DF	Kwadwo Addai	7 September 1995 (aged 27)	0	0	(Ghana Football Association) Karela United
28	DF	Amos Acheampong	12 October 1993 (aged 29)	0	0	(Ghana Football Association) Great Olympics
7	MF	Simba Sylvester	29 July 2001 (aged 21)	0	0	(Ghana Football Association) Dreams
8	MF	David Abagna	9 September 1998 (aged 24)	1	0	(Ghana Football Association) Real Tamale United
10	MF	Jonah Attuquaye	15 June 2000 (aged 22)	0	0	(Ghana Football Association) Legon Cities
11	MF	Gladson Awako	31 December 1990 (aged 32)	2	0	(Ghana Football Association) Hearts of Oak
13	MF	Dominic Nsobila	19 December 2002 (aged 20)	0	0	(Ghana Football Association) Accra Lions
20	MF	Maxwell Arthur	4 December 2000 (aged 22)	0	0	(Ghana Football Association) Dreams
24	MF	Seidu Suraj	29 January 2001 (aged 21)	0	0	(Ghana Football Association) Hearts of Oak
27	MF	Caleb Amankwah	15 October 1997 (aged 25)	0	0	(Ghana Football Association) Hearts of Oak
6	FW	Kwame Otu	11 January 2002 (aged 21)	0	0	(Ghana Football Association) Dreams
17	FW	Augustine Boakye	11 October 2001 (aged 21)	0	0	(Ghana Football Association) Kotoku Royals
18	FW	Daniel Afriyie	11 January 2002 (aged 21)	7	3	(Ghana Football Association) Hearts of Oak
19	FW	Yusif Abdul Razak	2 December 2001 (aged 21)	0	0	(Ghana Football Association) Great Olympics
23	FW	Kofi Kordzi	2 January 1995 (aged 28)	0	0	(Ghana Football Association) Legon Cities

== Group D ==
=== Mali ===
Manager: Nouhoum Diane

No.	Pos.	Player	Date of birth (age)	Caps	Goals	Club
1	GK	Germain Berthé	24 October 1993 (aged 29)	4	0	(Malian Football Federation) AS Real Bamako
16	GK	Aboubacar Doumbia	21 November 1995 (aged 27)	0	0	(Malian Football Federation) Afrique Football Élite
22	GK	N'Golo Traoré	31 December 1999 (aged 23)	0	0	(Malian Football Federation) Stade Malien
2	DF	Ismael Bamba	15 March 1993 (aged 29)	0	0	(Malian Football Federation) AS Real Bamako
3	DF	Ousmane Diallo	5 November 1999 (aged 23)	0	0	(Malian Football Federation) Djoliba AC
4	DF	Yoro Diaby	11 February 2001 (aged 21)	0	0	(Malian Football Federation) Yeelen Olympique
5	DF	Émile Koné	17 September 1989 (aged 33)	0	0	(Malian Football Federation) AS Real Bamako
12	DF	Souleymane Coulibaly	8 August 1996 (aged 26)	1	0	(Malian Football Federation) AS Real Bamako
13	DF	Barou Sanogo	18 April 1995 (aged 27)	2	0	(Malian Football Federation) Djoliba AC
15	DF	Mamadou Doumbia	28 December 1995 (aged 27)	16	0	(Malian Football Federation) Stade Malien
17	DF	Ahmed Diomande	15 December 2002 (aged 20)	0	0	(Malian Football Federation) Afrique Football Élite
6	MF	Makan Samabaly	11 June 1995 (aged 27)	10	0	(Malian Football Federation) AS Real Bamako
8	MF	Aly Desse Sissoko	5 May 1995 (aged 27)	3	1	(Malian Football Federation) Stade Malien
10	MF	Hamidou Sinayoko	11 March 1986 (aged 36)	8	2	(Malian Football Federation) Djoliba AC
11	MF	Ibourahima Sidibé	27 December 1992 (aged 30)	13	2	(Malian Football Federation) AS Real Bamako
14	MF	Fady Sidiki Coulibaly	27 January 2002 (aged 20)	1	0	(Malian Football Federation) Djoliba AC
18	MF	Cheickna Diakité	25 December 2004 (aged 18)	0	0	(Malian Football Federation) AS Real Bamako
19	MF	Moussa Coulibaly	15 February 1996 (aged 26)	3	0	(Malian Football Federation) AS Real Bamako
20	MF	Nankoma Keita	22 September 2002 (aged 20)	0	0	(Malian Football Federation) Djoliba AC
23	MF	Cheick Keita	26 May 2005 (aged 17)	0	0	(Malian Football Federation) AS Real Bamako
24	MF	Oumar Camara	5 November 1996 (aged 26)	1	0	(Malian Football Federation) Djoliba AC
7	FW	Ousmane Coulibaly Kalaba	12 January 2002 (aged 21)	0	0	(Malian Football Federation) Djoliba AC
9	FW	Moussa Koné	19 December 1990 (aged 32)	12	4	(Malian Football Federation) Stade Malien
21	FW	Djibril Coulibaly	28 March 1994 (aged 28)	2	0	(Malian Football Federation) Djoliba AC
25	FW	Moctar Cissé	10 March 1993 (aged 29)	2	0	(Malian Football Federation) US Bougouni
26	FW	Sada Diallo	9 July 2001 (aged 21)	0	0	(Malian Football Federation) Stade Malien

=== Angola ===
Manager: (Portugal) Pedro Gonçalves

No.	Pos.	Player	Date of birth (age)	Caps	Goals	Club
1	GK	Hugo Marques	15 January 1986 (aged 36)	18	0	(Angolan Football Federation) Petro de Luanda
12	GK	Zacarias "Mig" Sambambi	20 August 1993 (aged 29)	0	0	(Angolan Football Federation) Lunda Sul
22	GK	Neblú	7 December 1993 (aged 29)	9	0	(Angolan Football Federation) 1° de Agosto
3	DF	Domingos Razão	1 January 1998 (aged 25)	3	0	(Angolan Football Federation) Interclube
5	DF	Kinito	13 March 1998 (aged 24)	12	0	(Angolan Football Federation) Petro de Luanda
8	DF	Paizo	10 May 1992 (aged 30)	18	0	(Angolan Football Federation) 1° de Agosto
13	DF	Tó Carneiro	5 November 1995 (aged 27)	14	0	(Angolan Football Federation) Petro de Luanda
15	DF	Lulas	17 May 1996 (aged 26)	1	0	(Angolan Football Federation) Sagrada Esperança
21	DF	Eddie Afonso	7 March 1994 (aged 28)	20	0	(Angolan Football Federation) Petro de Luanda
23	DF	Victoriano	1 January 1994 (aged 29)	2	0	(Angolan Football Federation) Sagrada Esperança
25	DF	Antonio Hossi	12 June 2001 (aged 21)	3	0	(Angolan Football Federation) 1° de Agosto
27	DF	Pedro Bondo	16 November 2004 (aged 18)	0	0	(Angolan Football Federation) Petro de Luanda
2	MF	Kibeixa	18 July 1993 (aged 29)	4	0	(Angolan Football Federation) Wiliete
4	MF	Além	6 December 1997 (aged 25)	1	0	(Angolan Football Federation) Petro de Luanda
6	MF	Manuel Keliano	16 January 2003 (aged 19)	0	0	(Angolan Football Federation) 1° de Agosto
10	MF	Megue	2 December 1996 (aged 26)	5	2	(Angolan Football Federation) Petro de Luanda
16	MF	Higino	3 June 1994 (aged 28)	3	1	(Angolan Football Federation) Interclube
18	MF	Herenilson	26 August 1996 (aged 26)	40	0	(Angolan Football Federation) 1° de Agosto
20	MF	Lépua	23 December 1999 (aged 23)	5	0	(Angolan Football Federation) Sagrada Esperança
24	MF	Caneta	12 August 2000 (aged 22)	0	0	(Angolan Football Federation) C.R.D. Libolo
26	MF	Benvindo Afonso	10 October 2001 (aged 21)	0	0	(Angolan Football Federation) Académica Lobito
7	FW	Gilberto	1 January 2001 (aged 22)	1	0	(Angolan Football Federation) Petro de Luanda
9	FW	Depú	8 January 2000 (aged 23)	1	0	(Angolan Football Federation) Sagrada Esperança
11	FW	Jaredi Teixeira	11 November 1998 (aged 24)	3	0	(Angolan Football Federation) Petro de Luanda
14	FW	Jô Paciencia	7 July 1996 (aged 26)	2	1	(Angolan Football Federation) Sagrada Esperança
17	FW	Bito	7 December 2001 (aged 21)	5	0	(Angolan Football Federation) 1° de Agosto
19	FW	Julinho	17 May 1999 (aged 23)	3	1	(Angolan Football Federation) Interclube

=== Mauritania ===
Manager: (France) Amir Abdou

No.	Pos.	Player	Date of birth (age)	Caps	Goals	Club
1	GK	M'Backé N'Diaye	19 December 1994 (aged 28)	0	0	(Football Federation of the Islamic Republic of Mauritania) Nouakchott Kings
16	GK	Namori Diaw	30 December 1994 (aged 28)	0	0	(Football Federation of the Islamic Republic of Mauritania) ASC Kédia
22	GK	Mamoudou M'bodj	8 October 1999 (aged 23)	0	0	(Football Federation of the Islamic Republic of Mauritania) FC Nouadhibou
2	DF	Soukrana Mheimid	19 June 1999 (aged 23)	0	0	(Football Federation of the Islamic Republic of Mauritania) FC Nouadhibou
3	DF	Mohamedhen Beibou	5 December 1995 (aged 27)	0	0	(Football Federation of the Islamic Republic of Mauritania) FC Nouadhibou
4	DF	Nouh Mohamed El Abd	24 December 2000 (aged 22)	0	0	(Football Federation of the Islamic Republic of Mauritania) FC Nouadhibou
5	DF	Demine Saleck	30 November 1994 (aged 28)	0	0	(Football Federation of the Islamic Republic of Mauritania) FC Nouadhibou
12	DF	El Mokhtar Bilal	15 April 2001 (aged 21)	0	0	(Football Federation of the Islamic Republic of Mauritania) FC Nouadhibou
13	DF	Thierno Ba	25 March 1997 (aged 25)	0	0	(Football Federation of the Islamic Republic of Mauritania) FC Tevragh-Zeina
15	DF	Demba Traoré	30 September 1993 (aged 29)	0	0	(Football Federation of the Islamic Republic of Mauritania) FC Tevragh-Zeina
21	DF	Mohamed Lemine	6 June 2002 (aged 20)	0	0	(Football Federation of the Islamic Republic of Mauritania) FC Tevragh-Zeina
6	MF	Mohamed El Abd Sidi Ahmed	5 May 2001 (aged 21)	0	0	(Football Federation of the Islamic Republic of Mauritania) FC Tevragh-Zeina
8	MF	Mouhsine Bodda	18 July 1997 (aged 25)	0	0	(Football Federation of the Islamic Republic of Mauritania) FC Nouadhibou
10	MF	Bessam (c)	4 December 1987 (aged 35)	0	0	(Football Federation of the Islamic Republic of Mauritania) FC Nouadhibou
14	MF	Mohamed Dellahi Yali	1 November 1997 (aged 25)	0	0	(Football Federation of the Islamic Republic of Mauritania) FC Nouadhibou
18	MF	Khay Lejouade	1 December 1999 (aged 23)	0	0	(Football Federation of the Islamic Republic of Mauritania) ASC Tidjikja
19	MF	Ibréhima Coulibaly	30 July 1989 (aged 33)	15	0	(Football Federation of the Islamic Republic of Mauritania) FC Nouadhibou
23	MF	Sidi Bouna Amar	31 December 1998 (aged 24)	0	0	(Football Federation of the Islamic Republic of Mauritania) FC Nouadhibou
24	MF	Yacoub Sidi Ethmane	10 December 1995 (aged 27)	0	0	(Football Federation of the Islamic Republic of Mauritania) FC Nouadhibou
7	FW	Mamadou Sy	31 December 2000 (aged 22)	0	0	(Football Federation of the Islamic Republic of Mauritania) Nouakchott Kings
9	FW	Hemeya Tanjy	1 May 1998 (aged 24)	0	0	(Football Federation of the Islamic Republic of Mauritania) FC Nouadhibou
11	FW	Moulaye M'hamed Idriss	15 August 2001 (aged 21)	0	0	(Football Federation of the Islamic Republic of Mauritania) Nouakchott Kings
17	FW	Sidi Abdoullah Touda	10 December 1990 (aged 32)	0	0	(Football Federation of the Islamic Republic of Mauritania) Nouakchott Kings
20	FW	Yassin Cheikh El Welly	10 October 1998 (aged 24)	0	0	(Football Federation of the Islamic Republic of Mauritania) FC Nouadhibou
25	FW	Mahmoud El Hassen	11 October 1997 (aged 25)	0	0	(Football Federation of the Islamic Republic of Mauritania) Chemal FC

== Group E ==
=== Cameroon ===
Manager: Alioum Saidou

No.	Pos.	Player	Date of birth (age)	Caps	Goals	Club
1	GK	Patrick Lionel Kibyen	19 September 1998 (aged 24)	0	0	(Cameroonian Football Federation) Bamboutos
16	GK	Jourdain Mbaynassem	15 February 1994 (aged 28)	0	0	(Cameroonian Football Federation) Canon Yaoundé
23	GK	Marcelin Mbahbi	31 January 2000 (aged 22)	0	0	(Cameroonian Football Federation) Gazelle de Garoua
2	DF	Jerome Ngom Mbekeli	30 September 1998 (aged 24)	3	0	(Cameroonian Football Federation) Colombe Sportive
3	DF	Yves Alain Moukoko	26 June 1990 (aged 32)	0	0	(Cameroonian Football Federation) Canon Yaoundé
4	DF	Thomas Bawak Etta	10 July 1994 (aged 28)	0	0	(Cameroonian Football Federation) PWD Bamenda
5	DF	Donatien Tchami	13 March 1998 (aged 24)	0	0	(Cameroonian Football Federation) Bamboutos
6	DF	Che Malon	23 May 1999 (aged 23)	0	0	(Cameroonian Football Federation) Coton Sport
12	DF	Ibrahim Abba	22 April 1999 (aged 23)	0	0	(Cameroonian Football Federation) Coton Sport
18	DF	Ibrahim Saidou	4 June 2001 (aged 21)	0	0	(Cameroonian Football Federation) Fauve Azur Yaoundé
20	DF	Houzaifi Youssoufa	8 August 1999 (aged 23)	0	0	(Cameroonian Football Federation) Coton Sport
7	MF	Guy Eyike	9 January 2001 (aged 22)	0	0	(Cameroonian Football Federation) Union Douala
8	MF	Arthur Ebong	15 December 2004 (aged 18)	0	0	(Cameroonian Football Federation) Fauve Azur Yaoundé
13	MF	Djawal Kaiba	8 February 2003 (aged 19)	0	0	(Cameroonian Football Federation) Coton Sport
15	MF	Harrison Djonkep	4 August 2001 (aged 21)	0	0	(Cameroonian Football Federation) Eding Sport
17	MF	Martial Zemba Ikoung	18 February 1999 (aged 23)	0	0	(Cameroonian Football Federation) Apejes Mfou
19	MF	Enjonaei "Louis" Mbah	1 April 1997 (aged 25)	0	0	(Cameroonian Football Federation) Eding Sport
21	MF	Prince Junior Sime	20 July 1997 (aged 25)	0	0	(Cameroonian Football Federation) Eding Sport
22	MF	Joseph Iyendjock	29 May 2003 (aged 19)	0	0	(Cameroonian Football Federation) Union Douala
24	MF	Joel Paten	10 December 2003 (aged 19)	0	0	(Cameroonian Football Federation) Union Douala
9	FW	Emmanuel Beken	23 May 1998 (aged 24)	0	0	(Cameroonian Football Federation) Fovu Club
10	FW	Valentin Beo Batto	10 October 1996 (aged 26)	0	0	(Cameroonian Football Federation) Les Astres
11	FW	Junior Kemajou	4 December 1995 (aged 27)	0	0	(Cameroonian Football Federation) Bamboutos
14	FW	Donfack Nguimzeu	28 July 1998 (aged 24)	0	0	(Cameroonian Football Federation) Coton Sport
25	FW	Roche Foning	15 August 2000 (aged 22)	0	0	(Cameroonian Football Federation) Union Douala

=== Congo ===
Manager: Jean Élie Ngoya

The squad was announced on 2 January 2023.

No.	Pos.	Player	Date of birth (age)	Caps	Goals	Club
1	GK	Giscard Mavoungou	26 September 1999 (aged 23)	1	0	(Congolese Football Federation) Diables Noirs
16	GK	Chancel Massa	28 August 1985 (aged 37)	21	0	(Congolese Football Federation) AC Léopards
23	GK	Pavelh Ndzila	12 January 1995 (aged 28)	15	0	(Congolese Football Federation) AS Otohô
3	DF	Hernest Briyock Malonga	3 October 2002 (aged 20)	4	0	(Congolese Football Federation) Diables Noirs
4	DF	Julfin Ondongo	23 March 1990 (aged 32)	8	0	(Congolese Football Federation) AS Otohô
14	DF	Faria Jobel Ondongo	19 June 1996 (aged 26)	6	0	(Congolese Football Federation) AS Otohô
15	DF	Janard Mbemba	6 March 2002 (aged 20)	0	0	(Congolese Football Federation) Diables Noirs
19	DF	Louifrid Lessomo	15 June 1999 (aged 23)	0	0	(Congolese Football Federation) Inter Club
25	DF	Arnauvy Mombouli	4 May 2004 (aged 18)	0	0	(Congolese Football Federation) Inter Club
2	MF	Venold Dzaba	18 May 1998 (aged 24)	0	0	(Congolese Football Federation) AS BNG
6	MF	Joseph Mbangou	7 September 1994 (aged 28)	1	0	(Congolese Football Federation) Étoile du Congo
8	MF	Hardy Binguila	17 July 1996 (aged 26)	28	5	(Congolese Football Federation) Diables Noirs
10	MF	Prince Obongo	21 February 1997 (aged 25)	7	0	(Congolese Football Federation) Diables Noirs
18	MF	Borel Tomandzoto	14 August 2002 (aged 20)	0	0	(Congolese Football Federation) AS Otohô
7	FW	Pomi Nzaou	9 February 2003 (aged 19)	1	0	(Congolese Football Federation) JS Talangaï
9	FW	Déo Bassinga	11 August 2005 (aged 17)	2	0	(Congolese Football Federation) Diables Noirs
11	FW	Domi Massoumou	4 June 2003 (aged 19)	0	0	(Congolese Football Federation) Diables Noirs
12	FW	Mignon Koto	4 November 2004 (aged 18)	0	0	(Congolese Football Federation) AS BNG
13	FW	Junior Elenga	22 May 2000 (aged 22)	0	0	(Congolese Football Federation) AS Otohô
20	FW	Kader Bidimbou	20 February 1996 (aged 26)	12	5	(Congolese Football Federation) AS Otohô
21	FW	Prince Soussou Ilendo	25 May 2003 (aged 19)	1	0	(Congolese Football Federation) Diables Noirs
22	FW	Japhet Mankou	7 June 2002 (aged 20)	3	0	(Congolese Football Federation) Inter Club
24	FW	Love Bissila	5 April 2001 (aged 21)	0	0	(Congolese Football Federation) AC Léopards

=== Niger ===
Manager: Harouna Doula Gabde

No.	Pos.	Player	Date of birth (age)	Caps	Goals	Club
1	GK	Yahaya Babari	22 September 1993 (aged 29)	2	0	(Nigerien Football Federation) AS GNN
16	GK	Issiaka Boukari Kanta	2 July 1999 (aged 23)	0	0	(Nigerien Football Federation) ASN Nigelec
22	GK	Mahamadou Tanja	5 July 1996 (aged 26)	5	0	(Nigerien Football Federation) AS FAN
28	GK	Younoussa Abiboulaye	3 September 2004 (aged 18)	0	0	(Nigerien Football Federation) Sahel SC
2	DF	Adamou Ibrahim Djibo	13 August 1998 (aged 24)	5	0	(Nigerien Football Federation) ASN Nigelec
3	DF	Ismael Issaka Souley	18 July 2000 (aged 22)	3	0	(Nigerien Football Federation) AS Police
5	DF	Abdoul Garba	23 December 1991 (aged 31)	29	1	(Nigerien Football Federation) AS Douanes
6	DF	Abdoul Kader Rafiu Kassali	30 September 1998 (aged 24)	0	0	(Nigerien Football Federation) US GN
15	DF	Abdoulaye Boureima Katkoré	26 March 1993 (aged 29)	45	0	(Nigerien Football Federation) AS Douanes
17	DF	Mohamed Idrissa Karimou	6 April 1993 (aged 29)	1	0	(Nigerien Football Federation) US GN
25	DF	Laouali Hachimou Salaou	21 October 1996 (aged 26)	0	0	(Nigerien Football Federation) ASN Nigelec
26	DF	Alhabib Hassane Abdou	24 August 2003 (aged 19)	0	0	(Nigerien Football Federation) AS Douanes
27	DF	Razak Seyni	1 January 1990 (aged 33)	21	1	(Nigerien Football Federation) ASN Nigelec
8	MF	Moussa Kassa Moudou	11 November 1999 (aged 23)	0	0	(Nigerien Football Federation) US GN
12	MF	Ousseini Badamassi	21 April 1997 (aged 25)	5	0	(Nigerien Football Federation) AS Douanes
13	MF	Mahmadou Rabiou Ibrahim	20 April 1993 (aged 29)	0	0	(Nigerien Football Federation) ASN Nigelec
18	MF	Moussa Bilya	23 March 1993 (aged 29)	0	0	(Nigerien Football Federation) AS Police
20	MF	Fayçal Iboun	3 January 1994 (aged 29)	2	0	(Nigerien Football Federation) AS Police
21	MF	Abdoul Rachid Amoumane Inkad	13 May 2002 (aged 20)	0	0	(Nigerien Football Federation) ASN Nigelec
23	MF	Kader Aboubacar	31 December 2000 (aged 22)	2	0	(Nigerien Football Federation) US GN
24	MF	Salissou Marouf	5 November 1994 (aged 28)	0	0	(Nigerien Football Federation) AS FAN
4	FW	Ibrahim Danja	1 January 2002 (aged 21)	0	0	(Nigerien Football Federation) AS GNN
7	FW	Yacine Massamba	9 March 2000 (aged 22)	0	0	(Nigerien Football Federation) US GN
9	FW	Ibrahim Abdoul Aziz Koné	15 March 1996 (aged 26)	20	1	(Nigerien Football Federation) AS Douanes
10	FW	Mossi Issa Moussa	24 January 1993 (aged 29)	14	4	(Nigerien Football Federation) AS Douanes
11	FW	Boubacar Hainikoye	7 October 1998 (aged 24)	14	2	(Nigerien Football Federation) US GN
14	FW	Imarana Seyni	1 January 1992 (aged 31)	6	1	(Nigerien Football Federation) AS FAN
19	FW	Boubacar Djibrill Goumey	14 July 2000 (aged 22)	4	0	(Nigerien Football Federation) ASN Nigelec
