= Ethiopia national football team results (2020–present) =

This article provides details of international football games played by the Ethiopia national football team from 2020 to present.

== Results ==
Key
Win
Draw
Defeat

=== 2020 ===
22 October 2020 Friendly	Ethiopia	2–3	Zambia	Addis Ababa, Ethiopia
16:00 UTC+3	Kebede 13'; Tamene 41' (pen.)	Report	Kampamba 40'; Kangwanda 87', 90+3'	Stadium: Addis Ababa Stadium

25 October 2020 Friendly	Ethiopia	1–3	Zambia	Addis Ababa, Ethiopia
16:00 UTC+3	Kebede 87'	Report	Chabula 15', 37'; Sikombe 25'	Stadium: Addis Ababa Stadium

13 November 2020 2021 AFCONQ	Niger	1–0	Ethiopia	Niamey, Niger
17:00 UTC+1	Oumarou 73'	Report		Stadium: Stade Général Seyni Kountché; Referee: Hassen Corneh (Liberia)

17 November 2020 2021 AFCONQ	Ethiopia	3–0	Niger	Bahir Dar, Ethiopia
16:00 UTC+3	Gebremichael 13'; Mohammed 43'; Kebede 70'	Report		Stadium: Bahir Dar Stadium; Referee: Daudu Williams (Sierra Leone)

=== 2021 ===
17 March 2021 Friendly	Ethiopia	4–0	Malawi	Bahir Dar, Ethiopia
	Mohammed 16'; Kebede 45'; Dagnachew 57'; Nassir 71'			Stadium: Bahir Dar Stadium

24 March 2021 2021 AFCONQ	Ethiopia	4–0	Madagascar	Addis Ababa, Ethiopia
16:00 UTC+3	Gebremichael 19'; Kebede 34'; Nassir 41'; Bekele 86'	Report		Stadium: Addis Ababa Stadium; Referee: Sidi Alioum (Cameroon)

30 March 2021 2021 AFCONQ	Ivory Coast	3–1	Ethiopia	Abidjan, Ivory Coast
13:00 UTC+0	Boly 3'; Kessié 19' (pen.); Kouassi 76'	Report	Kebede 74'	Stadium: Stade Olympique Alassane Ouattara; Referee: Charles Bulu (Ghana)

3 September 2021 2022 World Cup qualification	Ghana	1–0	Ethiopia	Cape Coast, Ghana
19:00 UTC+0	Wakaso 35'	Report		Stadium: Cape Coast Sports Stadium; Attendance: 2,250; Referee: Redouane Jiyed (Morocco)

7 September 2021 2022 World Cup qualification	Ethiopia	1–0	Zimbabwe	Bahir Dar, Ethiopia
19:00 UTC+3	Tamene 90+4' (pen.)	Report		Stadium: Bahir Dar Stadium; Referee: Bernard Camille (Seychelles)

9 October 2021 2022 World Cup qualification	Ethiopia	1–3	South Africa	Bahir Dar, Ethiopia
16:00 UTC+3	Kebede 67'	Report	Mokoena 45+1'; Mvala 71'; Makgopa 90+1'	Stadium: Bahir Dar Stadium; Referee: Shuhoub Abdulbasit (Libya)

12 October 2021 2022 World Cup qualification	South Africa	1–0	Ethiopia	Johannesburg, South Africa
18:00 UTC+2	Kebede 11' (o.g.)	Report		Stadium: FNB Stadium; Referee: Georges Gatogato (Burundi)

11 November 2021 2022 World Cup qualification	Ethiopia	1–1	Ghana	Johannesburg, South Africa
15:00 UTC+2	Kebede 72'	Report	A. Ayew 22'	Stadium: Orlando Stadium; Referee: Blaise Yuven Ngwa (Cameroon)

14 November 2021 2022 World Cup qualification	Zimbabwe	1–1	Ethiopia	Harare, Zimbabwe
15:00 UTC+2	Mahachi 39'	Report	Nassir 86'	Stadium: National Sports Stadium; Referee: Mohamed Ali Moussa (Niger)

30 December 2021 Friendly	Sudan	2–3	Ethiopia	Cameroon

=== 2022 ===
9 January 2022 2021 AFCON	Ethiopia	0–1	Cape Verde	Yaoundé, Cameroon
20:00 UTC+1		Report	Tavares 45+1'	Stadium: Olembe Stadium; Referee: Hélder Martins Rodrigues de Carvalho (Angola)

13 January 2022 2021 AFCON	Cameroon	4–1	Ethiopia	Yaoundé, Cameroon
17:00 UTC+1	Toko Ekambi 8', 68'; Aboubakar 53', 55'	Report	Hotessa 4'	Stadium: Olembe Stadium; Referee: Jean Jacques Ndala Ngambo (DR Congo)

17 January 2022 2021 AFCON	Burkina Faso	1–1	Ethiopia	Bafoussam, Cameroon
17:00 UTC+1	Bayala 25'	Report	Kebede 52' (pen.)	Stadium: Kouekong Stadium; Referee: Ahmad Imtehaz Heeralall (Mauritius)

25 March 2022 Friendly	Comoros	2–1	Ethiopia	Moroni, Comoros
17:00 UTC+3	Mattoir 7'; Mohamed 67'	Report	Dagnachew 79'	Stadium: Stade Omnisports de Malouzini; Referee: Nassir Salum (Tanzania)

28 May 2022 Friendly	Ethiopia	1–1	Lesotho	Adama, Ethiopia
	Bogale 61'	Report	Makha 20'	Stadium: Adama Stadium

30 May 2022 Friendly	Ethiopia	1–1	Lesotho	Adama, Ethiopia
				Stadium: Adama Stadium

5 June 2022 2023 AFCON Q	Malawi	2–1	Ethiopia	Lilongwe, Malawi
18:00 UTC+2	Mhango 10' (pen.), 34' (pen.)	Report	Nassir 68' (pen.)	Stadium: Bingu National Stadium; Referee: Abongile Tom (South Africa)

9 June 2022 2023 AFCON Q	Ethiopia	2–0	Egypt	Lilongwe, Malawi
18:00 UTC+2	Hotessa 21'; Bekele 39'	Report		Stadium: Bingu National Stadium; Referee: Georges Gatogato (Burundi)

19 August 2022 Friendly	Ethiopia	1–0	Uganda	Adama, Ethiopia
15:00 UTC+3	Meleyo; 90+3'			Stadium: Adama Stadium

21 August 2022 Friendly	Ethiopia	0–0	Uganda	Adama, Ethiopia
16:00 UTC+3		Report		Stadium: Adama Stadium

23 September 2022 Unofficial Friendly	Ethiopia	1–1	Sudan	Addis Ababa, Ethiopia
	Bekele 31'	Report	Omer 63'	Stadium: Abebe Bikila Stadium

26 September 2022 Friendly	Ethiopia	2–2	Sudan	Addis Ababa, Ethiopia
16:00 UTC+3	Hotessa 19'; Guegsa 41'	Report	El Shoaleh 21'; Abdelrahman 77'	Stadium: Abebe Bikila Stadium; Referee: Hassan Mohamed Hagi (Somalia)

=== 2023 ===
14 January 2022 African Nations Championship	Ethiopia	0–0	Mozambique	Algiers, Algeria
14:00 UTC+1		Report		Stadium: Nelson Mandela Stadium; Referee: Vincentia Amédomé (Togo)

17 January 2022 African Nations Championship	Algeria	1–0	Ethiopia	Algiers, Algeria
20:00 UTC+1	Mahious 52'	Report		Stadium: Nelson Mandela Stadium; Attendance: 34,987; Referee: Pierre Ghislain Atcho (Gabon)

21 January 2022 African Nations Championship	Libya	3–1	Ethiopia	Annaba, Algeria
20:00 UTC+1	Abu Arqoub 44'; Al-Abbasi 50'; Saltou 78'	Report	Panom 39' (pen.)	Stadium: 19 May 1956 Stadium; Referee: Messie Nkounkou (Congo)

19 March Friendly	Ethiopia	1–0	Rwanda	Addis Ababa, Ethiopia
9:00	Markneh 83'	Report		Stadium: Addis Ababa Stadium

24 March 2023 Africa Cup of Nations qualification	Guinea	2–0	Ethiopia	Casablanca, Morocco
20:30 UTC+0	Kamano 39'; Bayo 73'	Report		Stadium: Stade Mohammed V Referee: Djindo Louis Houngnandande (Benin)

27 March 2023 Africa Cup of Nations qualification	Ethiopia	2–3	Guinea	Rabat, Morocco
19:00 UTC+0	Markneh 34'; Jemma 90+5'	Report	Keïta 4'; Moriba 42'; Guilavogui 70'	Stadium: Prince Moulay Abdellah Stadium; Referee: Alhadi Allaou Mahamat (Chad)

20 June 2023 Africa Cup of Nations qualification	Ethiopia	0–0	Malawi	Maputo, Mozambique
16:00 UTC+2		Report		Stadium: Estádio do Zimpeto; Referee: Djindo Louis Houngnandande (Benin)

2 August Unofficial Friendly	Ethiopia	2–0	Guyana	Leesburg, Virginia, US
19:00		Report		Stadium: Segra Field

8 September 2023 Africa Cup of Nations qualification	Egypt	1–0	Ethiopia	Cairo, Egypt
19:00 UTC+3	Fathi 37'	Report		Stadium: 30 June Stadium; Referee: Patrice Tanguy Mebiame (Gabon)

15 November 2026 World Cup qualification	Ethiopia	0–0	Sierra Leone	El Jadida, Morocco
20:00 UTC+1		Report		Stadium: Ben M'Hamed El Abdi Stadium; Attendance: 50; Referee: Celso Alvação (Mozambique)

21 November 2026 World Cup qualification	Ethiopia	0–3	Burkina Faso	El Jadida, Morocco
20:00 UTC+1		Report	Touré 69'; B. Traoré 78' (pen.); Da. Ouattara 90'	Stadium: Ben M'Hamed El Abdi Stadium; Attendance: 385; Referee: Lamin Jammeh (Gambia)

=== 2024 ===
25 February Unofficial Friendly	Ethiopia	1–0	Uganda	Dire Dawa, Ethiopia
18:00 UTC−4	Biniam Ayten 69'			Stadium: Dire Dawa Stadium

21 March Friendly	Ethiopia	1–2	Lesotho	Addis Ababa, Ethiopia
	Yohannes 48'		Motebang 34'; Moerane 43'	Stadium: Addis Ababa Stadium

24 March Friendly	Ethiopia	2–1	Lesotho	Addis Ababa, Ethiopia
	Gugesa 51'; Markneh 61'		Fothoane 32'	Stadium: Addis Ababa Stadium

6 June 2026 World Cup qualification	Guinea-Bissau	0–0	Ethiopia	Bissau, Guinea-Bissau
16:00 UTC+0		Report		Stadium: Estádio 24 de Setembro; Referee: Djindo Louis Houngnandande (Benin)

9 June 2026 World Cup qualification	Djibouti	1–1	Ethiopia	El Jadida, Morocco
17:00 UTC+1	Dadzie 29'	Report	Wondimu 31'	Stadium: Ben M'Hamed El Abdi Stadium; Attendance: 100; Referee: Chelanget Sabila (Uganda)

4 September 2025 Africa Cup of Nations qualification	Tanzania	0–0	Ethiopia	Dar es Salaam, Tanzania
19:00 UTC+3		Report		Stadium: Benjamin Mkapa Stadium; Referee: Issa Sy (Senegal)

9 September 2025 Africa Cup of Nations qualification	Ethiopia	0–2	DR Congo	Dar es Salaam, Tanzania
22:00 UTC+3		Report	Bongonda 62'; Mayele 76'	Stadium: Benjamin Mkapa Stadium; Referee: Lahlou Benbraham (Algeria)

12 October 2025 Africa Cup of Nations qualification	Guinea	4–1	Ethiopia	Abidjan, Ivory Coast
16:00 UTC+0	Guirassy 18' (pen.), 37', 45+2'; Cissé 48'	Report	Markneh 53'	Stadium: Alassane Ouattara Stadium; Referee: Clément Kpan (Ivory Coast)

15 October 2025 Africa Cup of Nations qualification	Ethiopia	0–3	Guinea	Abidjan, Ivory Coast
19:00 UTC+0		Report	Guirassy 16', 23' (pen.); Touré 19'	Stadium: Alassane Ouattara Stadium; Referee: Mustapha Ghorbal (Algeria)

16 November 2025 Africa Cup of Nations qualification	Ethiopia	0–2	Tanzania	Kinshasa, DR Congo
16:00 UTC+1			Msuva 15'; Salum 31'	Stadium: Stade des Martyrs

19 November 2025 Africa Cup of Nations qualification	DR Congo	1–2	Ethiopia	Kinshasa, DR Congo
16:00 UTC+1	Batubinsika 90+2'	Report	Desta 36'; Nasir 90+6'	Stadium: Stade des Martyrs

22 December 2024 African Nations Championship qualification	Ethiopia	0–2	Sudan	Benghazi, Libya
16:00 UTC+2		Report	Muzmel 7'; Musa Kanti 90+6'	Stadium: Benina Martyrs Stadium

25 December 2024 African Nations Championship qualification	Sudan	2–1	Ethiopia	Benghazi, Libya
16:00 UTC+2	Musa Kanti 16'; Abdelrahman 69'	Report	Bekele 63'	Stadium: Benina Martyrs Stadium

=== 2025 ===
21 March 2026 FIFA World Cup Qualification	Ethiopia	0–2	Egypt	Casablanca, Morocco
21:00 UTC+1			Salah 31'; Zizo 40'	Stadium: Larbi Zaouli Stadium; Attendance: 300; Referee: Patrice Milazar (Mauritius)

24 March 2026 FIFA World Cup Qualification	Ethiopia	6–1	Djibouti	El Jadida, Morocco
22:00 UTC+1				Stadium: Ben M'Hamed El Abdi Stadium

2 August Hybrid Friendly	D.C. United (United States)	0–3	Ethiopia	Washington, D.C., United States
17:00 UTC−4				Stadium: Audi Field

5 September 2026 FIFA World Cup Qualification	Egypt	2–0	Ethiopia	Cairo, Egypt
	Salah 41' (pen.); Marmoush 45+2' (pen.)			Stadium: Cairo International Stadium

9 September 2026 FIFA World Cup Qualification	Sierra Leone	2–0	Ethiopia	Paynesville, Liberia
	M. Kamara 37'; Koroma 90+6'			Stadium: Samuel Kanyon Doe Sports Complex

8 October 2026 FIFA World Cup Qualification	Ethiopia	1–0	Guinea-Bissau	Kigali, Rwanda
	James 27'			Stadium: Amahoro Stadium

12 October 2026 FIFA World Cup Qualification	Burkina Faso	3–1	Ethiopia	Ouagadougou, Burkina Faso
	P. Kaboré 65', 82', 90+6'		Ayten 84'	Stadium: Stade du 4 Août

=== 2026 ===
27 March 2027 Africa Cup of Nations qualification	São Tomé and Príncipe	0–3	Ethiopia	El Jadida, Morocco
17:00 UTC+1		Report	Markneh 23'; Yalew 32', 78'	Stadium: Ben M'Hamed El Abdi Stadium; Referee: El Hadji Amadou Sy (Senegal)

31 March 2027 Africa Cup of Nations qualification	Ethiopia	1–0	São Tomé and Príncipe	Dire Dawa, Ethiopia
16:00 UTC+3		Report	Gugesa 7'	Stadium: Dire Dawa Stadium; Referee: Mohamed Marouf (Egypt)

6 June Friendly	Ethiopia	1–0	Malawi	Dire Dawa, Ethiopia
{18:00 UTC+3	Tilahun 1'	Report		Stadium: Dire Dawa Stadium; Referee: Mohamed Diraneh (Djibouti)

9 June Friendly	Ethiopia	1–1	Malawi	Dire Dawa, Ethiopia
19:00 UTC+3	Demte 42'	Report	Adepoju 19'	Stadium: Dire Dawa Stadium

== Forthcoming fixtures ==
TBD 2027 AFCON qualification	Ethiopia	v	Mozambique	TBD, Ethopia
TBD				Stadium: TBD

TBD 2027 AFCON qualification	Mozambique	v	Ethiopia	TBD, Mozambique
TBD				Stadium: TBD

TBD 2027 AFCON qualification	Ethiopia	v	Sudan	TBD, Ethiopia
TBD				Stadium: TBD

TBD 2027 AFCON qualification	Sudan	v	Ethiopia	TBD, Sudan
TBD				Stadium: TBD

TBD 2027 AFCON qualification	Senegal	v	Ethiopia	TBD, Senegal
TBD				Stadium: TBD

TBD 2027 AFCON qualification	Ethiopia	v	Senegal	TBD, Ethiopia
TBD				Stadium: TBD
