= Domingos Macandza =

Mozambican footballer

Personal information
- Birth name: Domingos João Macandza
- Date of birth: June 17, 1998 (age 28)
- Place of birth: Maputo, Mozambique
- Height: 1.75 m (5 ft 9 in)
- Position: Right-back

Team information
- Current team: Costa do Sol

Senior career*
Years	Team	Apps	(Gls)
2016–2020	Mazaquene		
2020–2021	Vilankulo		
2021–2022	AD Vilankulo		
2022–	Costa do Sol		

International career
2018–	Mozambique	19	(0)
- * Club domestic league appearances and goals

Domingos João Macandza (born 17 June 1998), sometimes known as Domingos Mexer, is a Mozambican professional footballer who plays as a right-back for Costa do Sol and the Mozambique national team.

== Career ==
Macandza began his senior career in the Moçambola with Mazaquene in 2016. On 2020, he had a stint with Vilankulo, and the following season with crosstown rivals AD Vilankulo. In January 2022, he transferred to Costa do Sol.

== International ==
Macandza debuted with the senior Mozambique national team in a 2–1 2018 COSAFA Cup loss to Madagascar on 27 May 2018. He played for Mozambique at the 2022 African Nations Championship. He was called up to the national team for the 2023 Africa Cup of Nations.
