= Andoniaina Andriamalala =

Malagasy footballer (born 1985)

Personal information
- Full name: Andoniaina Fanomezantsoa Andriamalala
- Date of birth: March 8, 1985 (age 41)
- Place of birth: Madagascar
- Position: Goalkeeper

Team information
- Current team: CNaPS

Senior career*
Years	Team	Apps	(Gls)
- Ajesaia
- CNaPS

International career
2008–	Madagascar		
- * Club domestic league appearances and goals

Andoniaina Andriamalala (born March 8, 1985) is a Malagasy footballer currently plays for CNaPS. He represented the Madagascar national team during 2010 FIFA World Cup qualification and at the 2019 Indian Ocean Island Games.
