= Khay Lejouade =

Mauritanian footballer

Personal information
- Full name: Mouhamed Khay Lejouade
- Date of birth: 1 December 1999 (age 26)
- Place of birth: Mauritania
- Position: Midfielder

Team information
- Current team: ASC Tidjikja

Senior career*
Years	Team	Apps	(Gls)
2017–	ASC Tidjikja		

International career^{‡}
2018–	Mauritania	1	(0)
- * Club domestic league appearances and goals ‡ National team caps and goals as of 12 October 2018

Mouhamed Khay Lejouade was born on 1 December 1999. He is a Mauritanian footballer who plays as a midfielder for ASC Tidjikja and the Mauritania national team.

== International career ==
Lejouade made his debut for Mauritania on 12 October 2018 against Angola.

== Career statistics ==
=== International ===
Statistics accurate as of match played 12 October 2018

Mauritania national team
Year	Apps	Goals
2018	1	0
Total	1	0
