= João Bonde =

Mozambican footballer

Personal information
- Birth name: João José Jone Bonde
- Date of birth: January 9, 1997 (age 29)
- Place of birth: Beira, Mozambique
- Height: 1.69 m (5 ft 6 1/2 in)
- Position: Midfielder

Team information
- Current team: Ferroviário Beira

Senior career*
Years	Team	Apps	(Gls)
2016–	Ferroviário Beira		

International career
2022–	Mozambique	14	(0)
- * Club domestic league appearances and goals

João José Jone Bonde (born 9 January 1997), sometimes known as Maza, is a Mozambican professional footballer who plays as a midfielder for Ferroviário Beira and the Mozambique national team.

== Career ==
Bonde began his senior career with Ferroviário Beira in 2016 in the Moçambola. He helped them win the 2016 and 2023 Moçambola tournaments. He was named he best domestic Mozambican footballer of 2023 by the Mozambican Football Federation.

== International ==
Bonde debuted with the senior Mozambique national team in the 2022 COSAFA Cup where they came in fourth place. He was part of the final squad that went to 2023 Africa Cup of Nations.

== Honours ==
Ferroviário Beira

- Moçambola: 2016, 2023
