= Amadú =

Mozambican footballer

Personal information
- Birth name: Amade Momade Issufo
- Date of birth: March 12, 1996 (age 30)
- Place of birth: Nampula, Mozambique
- Height: 1.87 m (6 ft 1 1/2 in)
- Position: Defensive midfielder

Team information
- Current team: Songo
- Number: 28

Senior career*
Years	Team	Apps	(Gls)
2015–2018	Ferroviário Nampula		
2018–	Songo	83	(2)
2023	→Ferroviário Beira (loan)	9	(1)

International career
2018–	Mozambique	27	(0)
- * Club domestic league appearances and goals

Amade Momade Issufo (born 12 March 1996), better known as Amadú, is a Mozambican professional footballer who plays as a defensive midfielder for Songo and the Mozambique national team.

== Career ==
Amadú began his senior career with Ferroviário Nampula in 2015, and helped them win the 2016 Moçambola. In 2018, he transferred to Songo where he won 2 more Moçambola. On 28 June 2023, he joined Ferroviário Beira on a short-term loan where he again won the Moçambola.

== International ==
Born in Mozambique, Amadú is of Malian descent. He debuted with the senior Mozambique national team in a 1–0 2019 Africa Cup of Nations qualification win over Zambia on 19 November 2018. He was called up to the national team for the 2023 Africa Cup of Nations.

== Honours ==
Ferroviário Nampula

- Moçambola: 2016

Songo

- Moçambola: 2018, 2022

Ferroviário Beira

- Moçambola: 2023
