= Saddan Guambe =

Mozambican footballer

Personal information
- Full name: Saddan Abdul Guambe
- Date of birth: 25 May 1988 (age 38)
- Place of birth: Beira, mozambique
- Position: Midfielder

Team information
- Current team: C.D. Maxaquene

Senior career*
Years	Team	Apps	(Gls)
2014–	C.D. Maxaquene		

International career^{‡}
2013–	Mozambique	7	(1)
- * Club domestic league appearances and goals as of 21:02, 5 January 2015 (UTC) ‡ National team caps and goals as of 21:02, 5 January 2015 (UTC)

Saddan Guambe (born 25 May 1988) is a Mozambican professional footballer who currently plays as a midfielder for ESM Gonfreville.
