= Bheu Januário =

Mozambican footballer

Personal information
- Full name: Bheu António Januário
- Date of birth: 11 August 1993 (age 33)
- Place of birth: Beira, Mozambique
- Height: 1.76 m (5 ft 9 in)
- Position: Right back

Team information
- Current team: UD Songo

Senior career*
Years	Team	Apps	(Gls)
2014–2017	Liga Desportiva de Maputo		
2017–2018	Nacional da Madeira	1	(0)
2018	→ AD Fafe (loan)	8	(0)
2018–	UD Songo		

International career^{‡}
2016–	Mozambique	7	(1)
- * Club domestic league appearances and goals as of 13:00, 15 March 2020 (UTC) ‡ National team caps and goals as of 13:00, 15 March 2020 (UTC)

Bheu António Januário (born 11 August 1993) is a Mozambican international footballer who plays for UD Songo, as a right back.

== Career ==
Born in Beira, Januário has played for Liga Desportiva de Maputo, Nacional da Madeira, AD Fafe and UD Songo.

He made his international debut for Mozambique in 2016.
