= Nelson Mandela Stadium =

Stadium in Baraki, Algeria

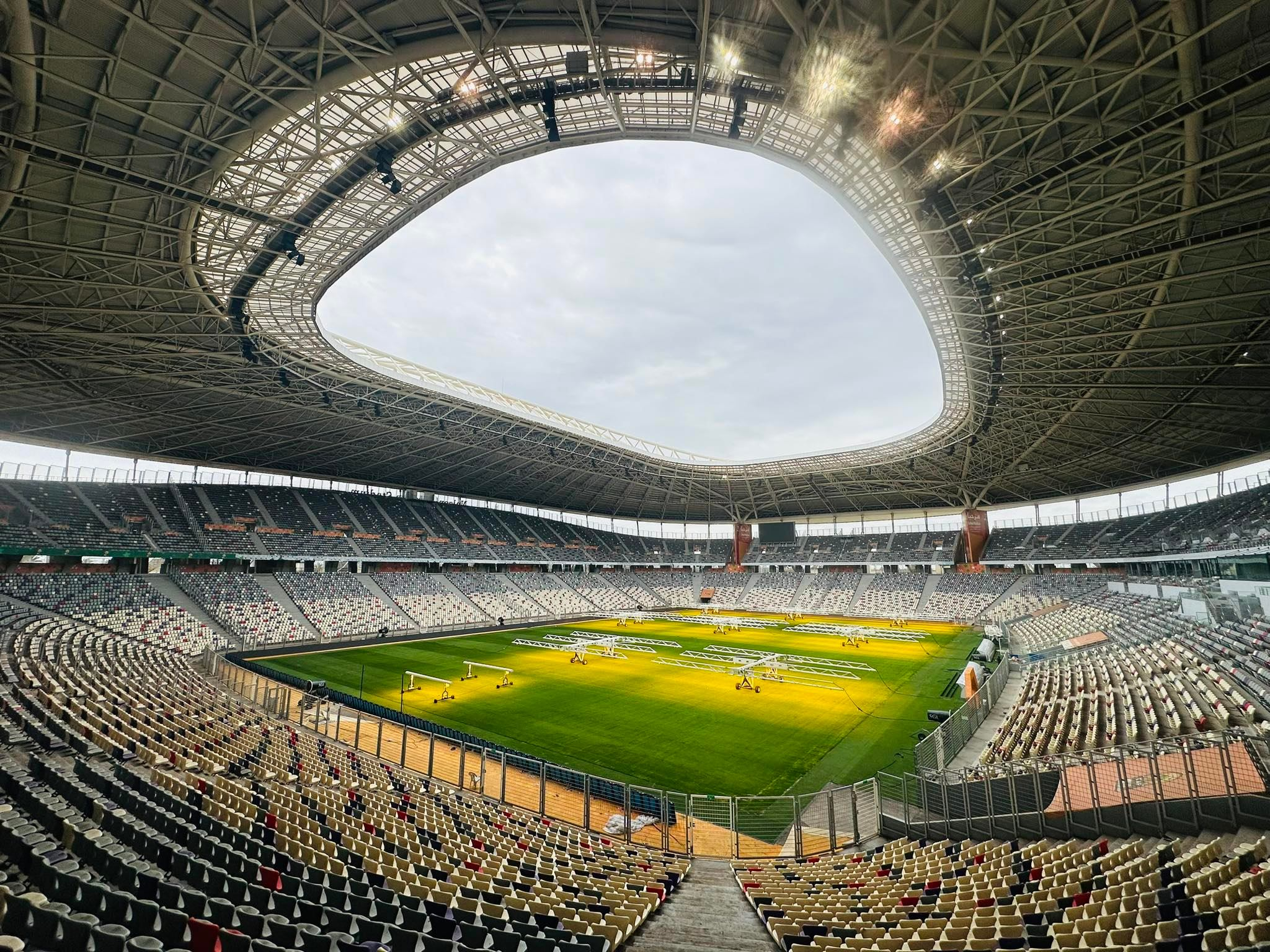
- Interior of the stadium in 2023
- Interactive map of Nelson Mandela Stadium
- Former names: Baraki Stadium
- Location: Pénétrante Rocade Sud (Baraki)-RN 1 (Birkhadem); Baraki, Algiers, Algeria
- Coordinates: 36°41′36″N 3°07′18″E
- Owner: Algerian Football Federation
- Operator: Ministry of Youth and Sport
- Capacity: 40,784
- Surface: Grass
- Field size: 105 by 68 metres (115 by 74 yd)

Construction
- Groundbreaking: 20 January 2010
- Built: 2010–2023
- Opened: 7 January 2023
- Cost: €280 million (€300 million in 2022)
- General contractor: China Railway Engineering Corporation

Tenant
- Algeria national football team (2023–present)

Nelson Mandela Stadium (Arabic: ملعب نيلسون مانديلا) is a sports stadium located in Baraki, suburb of Algiers, Algeria. The value of construction work for the stadium cost around €300 million. With a seating capacity of 40,784, it will be the first association-football-specific stadium in Algeria (meaning originally developed without an athletics track), and be the first stadium in Algeria, to be eligible to host all the matches organized by FIFA including the World Cup and the second stadium entirely covered in Algeria after the new Miloud Hadefi Stadium in Oran. The Nelson Mandela Stadium, which extends over a total area of 68 hectares, including 5 hectares built, includes all the infrastructure essential to the organization of international football events.

The sports infrastructure includes ancillary spaces including 50 accommodation rooms including two suites, a car park with a capacity of 6,000 vehicles on an area of 13 ha, a heliport for emergencies or the reception of official delegations, a replica field as well as green spaces. The stadium also has four changing rooms, dressing rooms for the referees, a medical area, a medical analysis laboratory, a hall of honor, a presidential stand, a conference room of 258 seats, a press area, radio and television broadcasting studios, three simultaneous interpretation studios, three 1,000-seat restaurants, fast food areas and other infrastructure.

== Stadium ==
=== Construction ===
Artist's rendering.

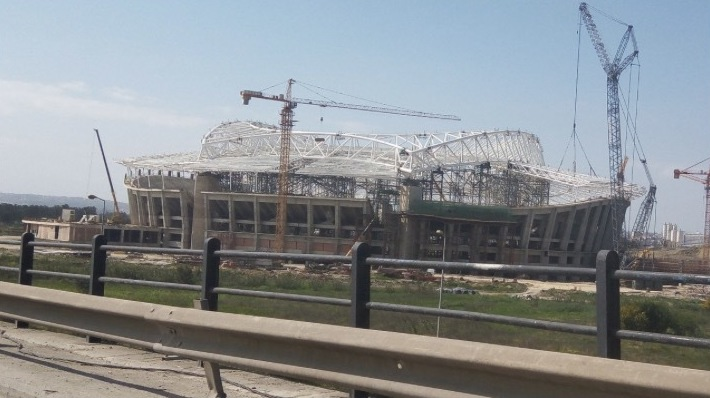
Construction of the Nelson Mandela Stadium, looking east, taken 24 March 2017.

The work began in 2010 by Chinese company China Railway Engineering Corporation to build Baraki Stadium with a capacity of 40,000 spectators. The stadium was planned for a capacity of 60,000 seats but was reduced to 40,000. The company had been very slow to progress and only 25 percent of the stadium was completed within four years. Work was disrupted again due to non payment. In this time Algeria missed the chance to host the African Cup in 2017. On March 29, the first stage of covering the pitch was completed and the first in charge of the sector was able to see that the internal works concerning the locker rooms and the VIP zones are already well advanced. On October 20 and on an official visit to the Governor of Algiers Abdelkader Zoukh and the Minister of Youth and Sports El Hadi Ould Ali to inspect the works on the stadium the governor gave great criticism to the company responsible for the accomplishment due to the large delay in the works. On May 6, 2022, Achour Djelloul stated for National Radio that they requested to take advantage of Baraki Stadium and that Groupe SERPORT is ready to carry out the remaining works in order to receive it as soon as possible, because Omar Hamadi Stadium has become a danger to the supporters. On October 24, 2022, the Minister of Housing, Urban Planning and the city, Mohamed Tariq Belarbi, launched the smart system during a working visit and an inspection of the stadium. During this visit carried out in the company of a delegation of journalists from the national and foreign press, it was noted the works of the Baraki stadium would be completed in 10 to 15 days, stressing that the date of its official inauguration would be set soon.

=== Name of the stadium ===
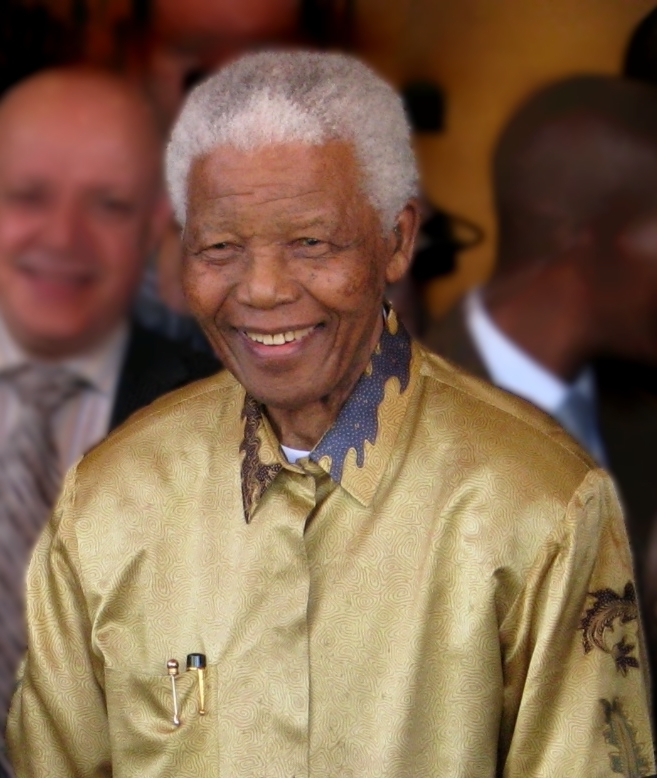
Nelson Mandela, the South African anti-apartheid activist who served as the first president of South Africa from 1994 to 1999.

On 18 October 2016, the chairman of the Algerian Football Federation, Mohamed Raouraoua, said the new Baraki stadium will carry the name of the late Abdelhamid Kermali, the former coach of the Algerian national football team, who lead the Fennecs (their nick-name) to win the 1990 African Cup of Nations. Raouraoua said during a lengthy interview he conducted with the Algerian television, that Abdelhamid Kermali left his mark in the history of Algerian football, as a player, but especially as a coach, since he granted Algeria, the only title yet, which was the reason the Algerian Football Federation chose his name to immortalize him with this stadium, which will be a spherical masterpiece after its launch. However, on December 20, 2022, the Minister of Youth and Sports announced that the country's supreme authorities had decided to name Baraki Stadium after Nelson Mandela the South African anti-apartheid hero. He continued to say that Mandela had an intimate, almost fusional relationship with Algeria, which he called his second homeland. He continued that Mandela said that “the Algerian Army made me a man”, to show his gratitude to Algeria, it is therefore logical that the Algerian authorities wanted to pay tribute to him by giving his name to this new stadium in the capital. On January 12, 2023, Algerian President Abdelmadjid Tebboune officially inaugurated the stadium, in the presence of the grandson of Nelson Mandela, FIFA President Gianni Infantino, and Confederation of African Football President Patrice Motsepe.

=== Handover and opening ===
On January 7, 2023, the first match was held between Algeria A' and Ghana A', and the first official match was in the opening of the 2022 African Nations Championship between Algeria A' and Libya A'. Before the start of the match, Djahid Zefizef President of the Algerian Football Federation, and the grandson of Nelson Mandela Mandla Mandela, and Patrice Motsepe, President of the Confederation of African Football, delivered speeches and the session was officially opened by Prime Minister Aymen Benabderrahmane. Also attending many African football stars, namely Emmanuel Adebayor, Karim Haggui, Rabah Madjer, Asamoah Gyan and Jay-Jay Okocha. and the presence of the Algerian international star Soolking, the rapper revealed that he will perform his most famous songs in Medley, with 3 songs including Suavemente and with Dadju where they performed the song Meleğim.

== Tenants and events ==
=== 2022 African Nations Championship ===
Date	Local time	Team No. 1	Result	Team No. 2	Round
13 January 2023	20:00	Algeria	1–0	Libya	Group A
14 January 2023	14:00	Ethiopia	0–0	Mozambique	Group A
17 January 2023	17:00	Mozambique	3–2	Libya	Group A
17 January 2023	20:00	Algeria	1–0	Ethiopia	Group A
21 January 2023	20:00	Mozambique	0–1	Algeria	Group A
22 January 2023	20:00	Uganda	1–3	Ivory Coast	Group B
27 January 2023	17:00	Algeria	1–0	Ivory Coast	Quarter-finals
31 January 2023	20:00	Senegal	1–0	Madagascar	Semi-finals
4 February 2023	20:30	Algeria	0–0 (4–5 pen.)	Senegal	Final

=== 2023 U-17 Africa Cup of Nations ===
Date	Local time	Team No. 1	Result	Team No. 2	Round
29 April 2023	20:00	Algeria	2–0	Somalia	Group A
30 April 2023	14:00	Senegal	1–0	Congo	Group A
2 May 2023	17:00	Algeria	0–3	Senegal	Group A
2 May 2023	20:00	Congo	1–1	Somalia	Group A
5 May 2023	20:00	Congo	1–1	Algeria	Group A
10 May 2023	17:00	Senegal	5–0	South Africa	Quarter-finals
11 May 2023	20:00	Nigeria	1–2	Burkina Faso	Quarter-finals
19 May 2023	22:00	Senegal	2-1	Morocco	Final

== Transport connections ==
The stadium is located next to the east–west highway that connects eastern and western Algeria, and this arena is located only 10 km from Houari Boumediene International Airport, which makes it an easy destination for foreign teams that come to the country to play in it.

== See also ==
- List of football stadiums in Algeria
- List of African stadiums by capacity
- List of association football stadiums by capacity

Events
Preceded by Ahmadou Ahidjo Stadium; Yaoundé	African Nations Championship; Final Venue; 2022	Succeeded by TBD
