= Suleman Hamid =

Ethiopian footballer (born 1997)

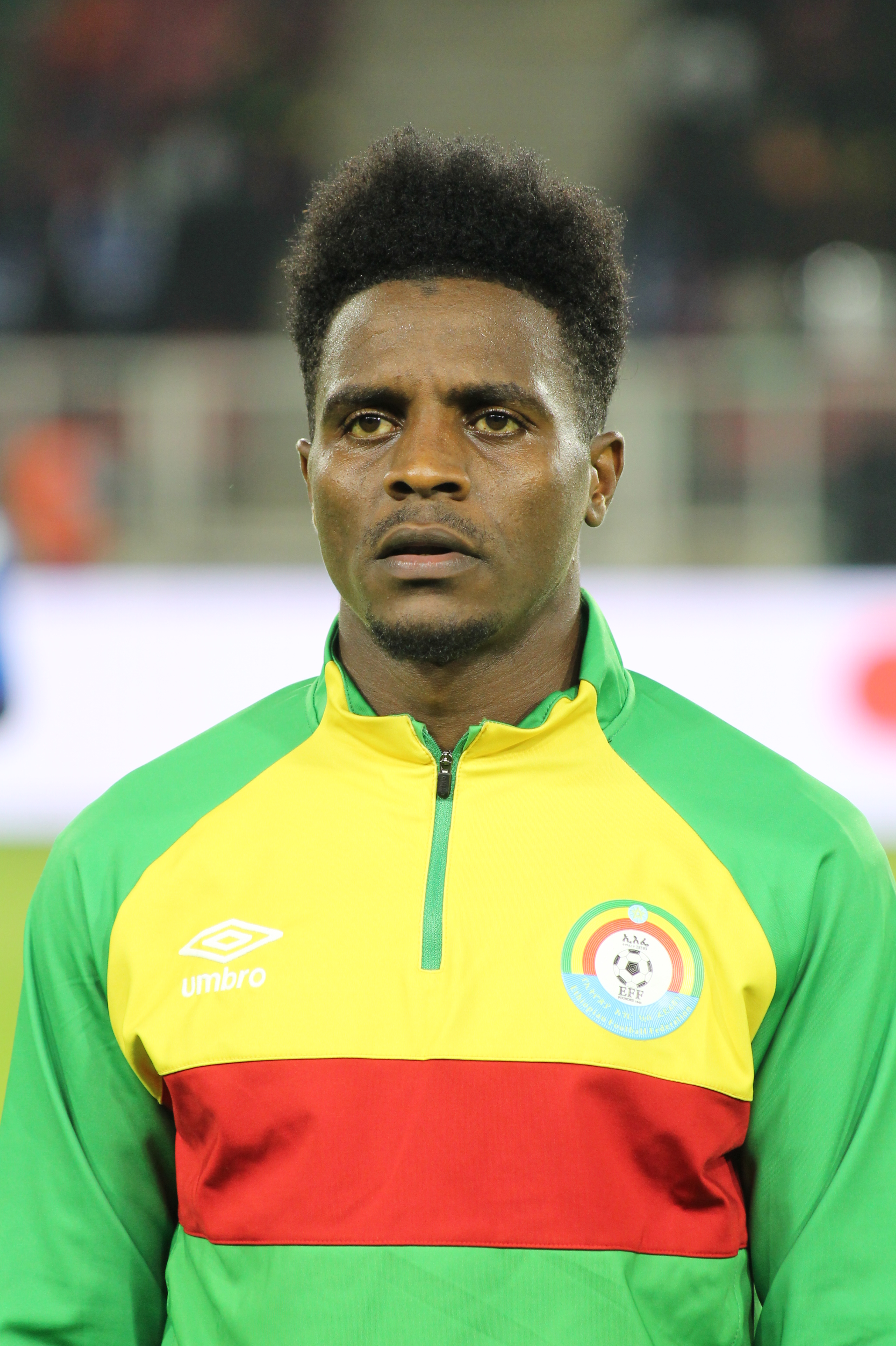
- Hamid with Ethiopia at the 2021 Africa Cup of Nations

Personal information
- Full name: Suleman Hamid Suleman
- Date of birth: 20 October 1997 (age 29)
- Place of birth: Asosa, Ethiopia
- Height: 1.77 m (5 ft 10 in)
- Position: Right-back

Team information
- Current team: CBE
- Number: 11

Senior career*
Years	Team	Apps	(Gls)
2017–2020	Adama City	15	(1)
2020–2021	Hadiya Hossana	17	(0)
2021–2023	Saint George	41	(1)
2023–	CBE	30	(4)

International career^{‡}
2020–	Ethiopia	32	(0)
- * Club domestic league appearances and goals as of 20:40, 27 November 2024 (UTC) ‡ National team caps and goals as of 20:40, 2 August 2023 (UTC)

Suleman Hamid Suleman (Amharic: ሱሌማን ሀሚድ; born 20 October 1997) is an Ethiopian professional footballer who plays as a right-back for the Ethiopian Premier League club CBE and the Ethiopia national team.

== Club career ==
Hamid began his career with Adama City.

On 1 November 2020, Hamid signed with Hadiya Hossana.

On 1 July 2021, Hamid signed with Saint George.

== International career ==
Hamid made his international debut with the Ethiopia national team in a 3–2 friendly loss to Zambia on 22 October 2020.

He then competed for the 2021 Africa Cup of Nations in Cameroon.
