= Fasil Kenema SC =

Association football club in Ethiopia

Fasil Kenema
- Full name: Fasil Kenema Sport Club
- Nickname: The Emperors
- Short name: FKSC
- Founded: 1968; 58 years ago (1960 E.C.)
- Ground: Fasiledes Stadium
- Capacity: 20,000
- Manager: Wubetu Abate
- League: Ethiopian Premier League
- 2025–26: 4th
Home colours	Away colours	Third colours

Fasil Kenema Sport Club (Amharic: ፋሲል ከነማ ስፖርት ክለብ), also known as Fasil City, is a professional Ethiopian football club based in Gondar, Amhara Region. They play in the Ethiopian Premier League, the top division of football in Ethiopia.

== History ==
=== Beginnings ===
Fasil Kenema is one of the oldest organized sport teams in Ethiopia. Established in 1968 (1960 E.C.), the club is named after the 17th century Ethiopian emperor Fasilides who ruled Ethiopia from its then capital city Gondar.

=== Promotion and relegation (2006–2016) ===
Having played for many years in the second division of Ethiopian football, the Ethiopian Higher League, the club earned its first promotion to the Premier League after the 2006–07 season. In their inaugural campaign, Fasil Kenema struggled to keep pace with most of the clubs. The club's stay in the top tier of Ethiopian football would be short-lived as the club was relegated back to the Higher League.

=== Return to the Premier League (2016–present) ===
It would take the club 8 years to reach the Premier League again, by virtue of becoming champions of the 2015–16 Higher League. Fasil Kenema was able to place 6th in the 2016–2017 Premier League, securing their stay in the top tier.

During a game against Welwalo Adigrat, they became the beneficiaries of a bizarre own goal by the Welwalo Adigrat goalkeeper. The goal was crucial as it turned out to be the winner, handing Fasil Kenema all 3 points. Fasil was Ethiopia's representative in the 2019–20 and 2020–21 CAF Confederation Cup by virtue of the club capturing the 2019 Ethiopian Cup. The club lifted its first league title after the 2020–21 season.

== Stadium ==
Fasil Kenema plays their home matches at Fasiledes Stadium in Gondar, Ethiopia. Named after the city founder, emperor Fasilides, it has served the club since its creation. In 2010, the stadium underwent renovation funded by the local municipality and private donors.

== Supporters ==
Fesil Kenema enjoys large support from residents of its home city and region of Gondar. The supporter are known for their relentless display of song and dance. The team is nicknamed "The Emperors" (አፄዎቹ) by its fans in reference to the great 17th century Ethiopian Emperor Fasilides.

== Continental record ==
- CAF Confederation Cup: 2 appearances

2020 – Preliminary Round
2021 – Preliminary Round

== Players (2025) ==
Note: Flags indicate national team as defined under FIFA eligibility rules; some limited exceptions apply. Players may hold more than one non-FIFA nationality.

No.	Pos.	Nation	Player
1	GK	MLI	N'Tji Michel Samaké
2	DF	ETH	Menaf Awol
4	DF	ETH	Mignot Debebe
6	MF	ETH	Elias Mamo
7	MF	ETH	Tafesse Solomon
8	MF	ETH	Yihun Endashew
9	FW	ETH	Getaneh Kebede (captain)
10	FW	ETH	Afkirot Solomon
11	FW	ETH	Amanuel Gebremichael
12	DF	ETH	Oyeb Matewos
14	MF	ETH	Yonatan Fisseha
15	DF	ETH	Temesgen Castro
17	MF	ETH	Abel Endale

No.	Pos.	Nation	Player
18	MF	ETH	Natnael Gebregiorgis
19	FW	ETH	Shimeket Gugesa
21	DF	ETH	Amsalu Tilahun
23	FW	ETH	Fikadu Alemu
24	DF	ETH	Abel Eyayu
25	DF	ETH	Daniel Zemede
27	FW	ETH	Alembirhan Yigzaw
28	MF	ETH	Natnael Masresha
29	GK	ETH	Tewodros Getnet
30	GK	ETH	Yidnekachew Beyene
31	GK	ETH	Tewodros Getnet

== Former managers ==
- (Ethiopia) Mentesenot Getu
- (Ethiopia) Seyoum Abate
- (Ethiopia) Wubetu Abate

== Honors ==
=== Domestic ===
- Ethiopian Premier League: 1

2021

- Ethiopian Cup: 1

2019

- Ethiopian Super Cup: 1

2019
