= Isac de Carvalho =

Mozambican footballer

Isac Carvalho
Personal information
- Full name: Isac Tomé Filipe de Carvalho
- Date of birth: 27 June 1989 (age 37)
- Place of birth: Maputo, Mozambique
- Height: 1.67 m (5 ft 6 in)
- Position: Forward

Team information
- Current team: Costa do Sol
- Number: 10

Senior career*
| Years | Team | Apps | (Gls) |
| 2008–2012 | GD Maputo | | |
| 2012–2013 | Liga Desportiva de Maputo | | |
| 2013–2017 | Maxaquene | | |
| 2017– | Costa do Sol | 25 | (10) |

International career^{‡}
| 2010– | Mozambique | 30 | (5) |
- * Club domestic league appearances and goals as of 23 July 2020 ‡ National team caps and goals as of 23 July 2020

Isac Tomé Filipe de Carvalho (born 27 June 1989) is a Mozambican footballer who plays as a forward for Costa do Sol and the Mozambique national football team.

== Career ==
=== International ===
Carvalho made his senior international debut on 17 November 2010, scoring Mozambique's lone goal in a 3-1 friendly defeat to Zimbabwe.

== Career statistics ==
=== International ===
As of matches played 4 August 2019.

| National team | Year | Apps | Goals |
|---|---|---|---|
| Mozambique | 2010 | 1 | 1 |
| Mozambique | 2013 | 1 | 0 |
| Mozambique | 2014 | 9 | 2 |
| Mozambique | 2015 | 11 | 2 |
| Mozambique | 2017 | 3 | 0 |
| Mozambique | 2018 | 3 | 0 |
| Mozambique | 2019 | 2 | 0 |
| Total | | 30 | 5 |

==== International Goals ====
Scores and results list Mozambique's goal tally first.

| Goal | Date | Venue | Opponent | Score | Result | Competition |
|---|---|---|---|---|---|---|
| 1. | 17 November 2010 | Estádio da Machava, Matola, Mozambique | Zimbabwe | 1–3 | 1–3 | Friendly |
| 2. | 18 May 2014 | Estádio do Zimpeto, Maputo, Mozambique | South Sudan | 5–0 | 5–0 | 2015 Africa Cup of Nations qualification |
| 3. | 20 July 2014 | Benjamin Mkapa National Stadium, Dar es Salaam, Tanzania | Tanzania | 2–2 | 2–2 | 2015 Africa Cup of Nations qualification |
| 4. | 28 May 2015 | Moruleng Stadium, Saulspoort, South Africa | Botswana | 1–0 | 2–1 | 2015 COSAFA Cup |
| 5. | 4 July 2015 | Stade Linité, Victoria, Seychelles | Seychelles | 2–0 | 4–0 | 2016 African Nations Championship qualification |
