= Aschalew Tamene =

Ethiopian footballer (born 1991)

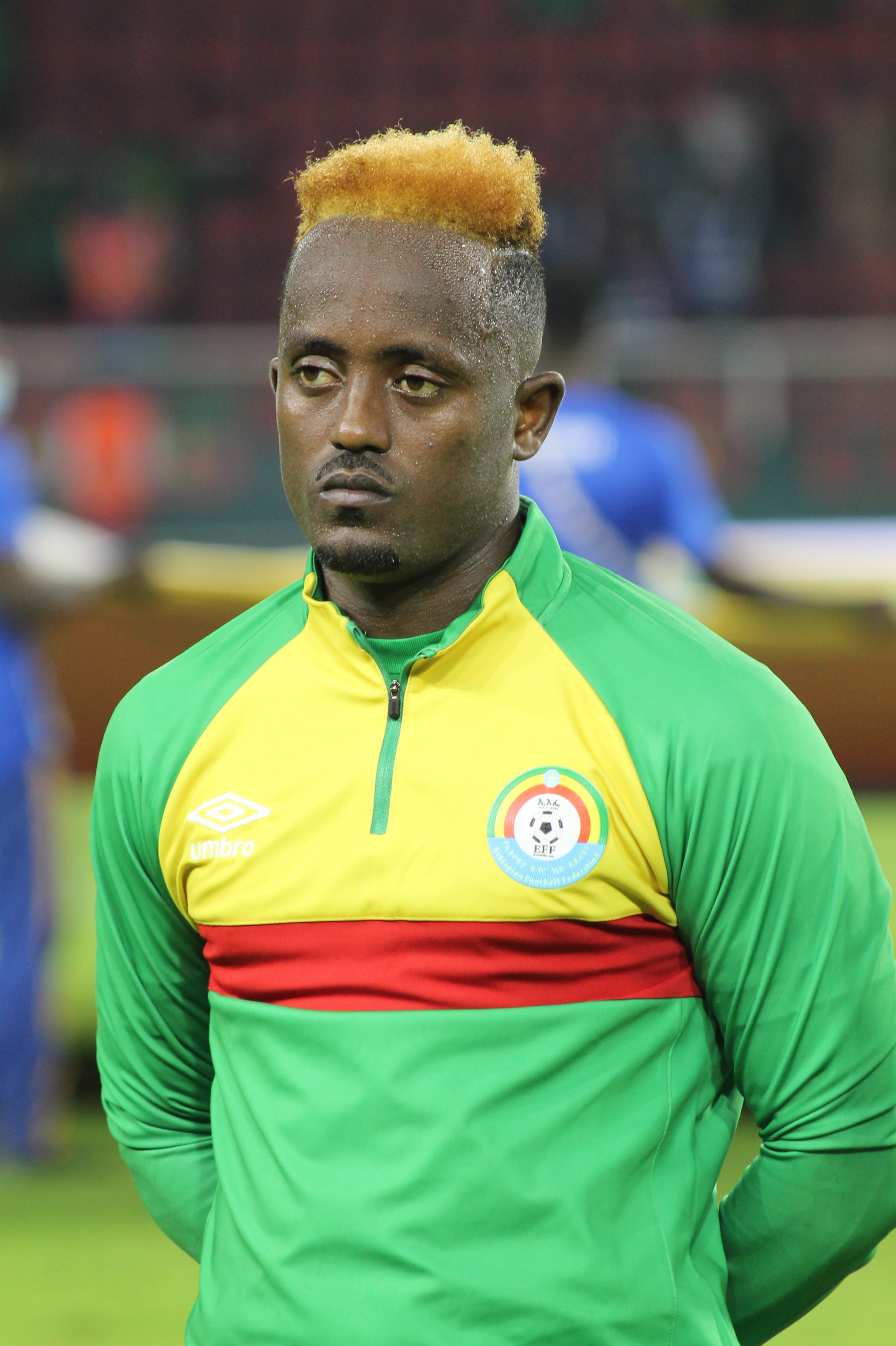
- Tamene with Ethiopia at the 2021 Africa Cup of Nations

Personal information
- Full name: Aschalew Tamene Seyoum
- Date of birth: 22 November 1991 (age 34)
- Place of birth: Dilla, Ethiopia
- Height: 1.78 m (5 ft 10 in)
- Position: Centre-back

Team information
- Current team: Defence Force
- Number: 15

Senior career*
Years	Team	Apps	(Gls)
2013–2015	Dedebit		
2015–2021	Saint George	29	(1)
2021–2023	Fasil Kenema	50	(0)
2023–	Defence Force	21	(0)

International career^{‡}
2015–	Ethiopia	71	(3)
- * Club domestic league appearances and goals as of 17:48, 24 May 2024 (UTC) ‡ National team caps and goals as of 17:48, 21 March 2024 (UTC)

Aschalew Tamene Seyoum (Amharic: አስቻለው ታመነ ስዩም; born 22 November 1991) is an Ethiopian professional footballer who plays as a centre-back for Ethiopian Premier League club Defence Force and the Ethiopia national team.

== Club career ==
=== Dedebit ===
Tamene began his professional career with Dedebit and made his debut in the 2013–14 Ethiopian Premier League. In that same season, he won the Ethiopian Cup with the club.

=== Saint George ===
On 14 September 2015, Tamene signed with Saint George. In his first season, he won the 2015–16 Ethiopian Premier League and the 2016 Ethiopian Cup. He also won 2016–17 Ethiopian Premier League with the club.

=== Fasil Kenema ===
On 14 July 2021, Tamene signed with Fasil Kenema.

== International career ==
Tamene made his international debut with the Ethiopia national team in a 1–0 friendly loss to Zambia on 7 June 2015.

He then participated in the 2015 CECAFA Cup, which took place in his home country. In this competition, he plays six games. Ethiopia ranks third in the tournament by beating Sudan to the goal in the "small final".

He then took part in the 2016 African Nations Championship. He played three games in this tournament held in Rwanda, which saw Ethiopia not go beyond the first round.

Tamene scored his first national team goal on July 26, 2019, against Djibouti. This match won 0-1 is part of the 2020 African Nations Championship qualification. On 22 October 2020, he scored a goal against Zambia, but this match was not recognized by FIFA. His second official goal was scored on 7 September 2021, against Zimbabwe, during the 2022 FIFA World Cup qualification.

He then competed in early 2022, the 2021 Africa Cup of Nations held in Cameroon.

== Career statistics ==
Scores and results list Ethiopia's goal tally first, score column indicates score after each Tamene goal.

List of international goals scored by Aschalew Tamene
No.	Date	Venue	Opponent	Score	Result	Competition
1	26 July 2019	El Hadj Hassan Gouled Aptidon Stadium, Djibouti City, Djibouti	Djibouti	1–0	1–0	2020 African Nations Championship qualification
2	22 October 2020	Addis Ababa Stadium, Addis Ababa, Ethiopia	Zambia	2–1	2–3	Friendly
3	7 September 2021	Bahir Dar Stadium, Bahir Dar, Ethiopia	Zimbabwe	1–0	1–0	2022 FIFA World Cup qualification
