= Wubetu Abate =

Ethiopian football manager (born 1978)

Personal information
- Full name: Wubetu Abate Wubetu
- Date of birth: 20 August 1978 (age 48)
- Place of birth: Adama, Ethiopia

Team information
- Current team: Fasil Kenema (manager)

Senior career*
Years	Team	Apps	(Gls)
- Pulp
- Worket

Managerial career
- –2007: Adama City
- Dedebit
- Ethiopian Coffee
- Al-Ahly Shendi
- CBE
- Hawassa City
- Fasil Kenema
- Sebeta City
- 2020–2023: Ethiopia
- 2023–: Fasil Kenema
- * Club domestic league appearances and goals

Wubetu Abate Wubetu (Amharic: ውበቱ አባተ; born 20 August 1978) is an Ethiopian professional football manager and former player who manages Fasil Kenema.

== Playing career ==
Before retiring due to injury, Abate played domestic football in Ethiopia for Pulp and Worket in the 1990s.

== Managerial career ==
Following retirement, Abate moved into coaching. In 2007, following success with Adama City, Abate was hired as manager of Dedebit. In 2011, Abate guided Ethiopian Coffee to the 2010–11 Ethiopian Premier League title. Abate later had stints at Sudanese club Al-Ahly Shendi, before returning to Ethiopia, managing CBE, Hawassa City, Fasil Kenema and Sebeta City. On 25 September 2020, Abate was confirmed as Ethiopia's manager, signing a two-year contract.

== Honors ==
Ethiopian Coffee

- Ethiopian Premier League: 2010–11
- 2021 Africa Cup of Nations
- 2022 African Nations Champions
