= Yihun Endashew =

Ethiopian footballer

Yihun Endashew Zewide
Personal information
- Full name: Yihun Endashew Zewide
- Date of birth: 5 November 1992 (age 33)
- Place of birth: Metehara, Ethiopia
- Position: Defensive midfielder

Team information
- Current team: Arba Minch City
- Number: 27

Senior career*
Years	Team	Apps	(Gls)
2015–2017	Dire Dawa City		
2017–2019	Jimma Aba Jifar		
2019–2020	Hadiya Hossana	16	(0)
2020–2024	Fasil Kenema	86	(2)
2024–	Arba Minch City	31	(0)

International career^{‡}
2015—	Ethiopia	21	(0)
- * Club domestic league appearances and goals as of 10:22, 15 June 2025 (UTC) ‡ National team caps and goals as of 10:22, 27 March 2023 (UTC)

Yihun Endashew Zewide (Amharic: ይሁን እንደሻው; born 5 November 1992) is an Ethiopian professional footballer who plays as a defensive midfielder for Ethiopian Premier League club Arba Minch City and the Ethiopia national team.

== Club career ==
On 25 September 2020, Fasil Kenema confirmed the completed signing of Endashew with a two-year contract.

On 1 September 2024, Endashew confirmed he signed with Arba Minch City.

== International career ==
Endashew made his international debut with Ethiopia in a 1–0 2015 CECAFA Cup loss to Rwanda on 21 November 2015.

On 25 December 2021, Endashew was named to Ethiopia's 25 man squad for the 2021 Africa Cup of Nations in Cameroon.
