= Francisco Muchanga =

Mozambican footballer

Personal information
- Full name: Francisco Lopes Albino Muchanga
- Date of birth: 5 November 1991 (age 35)
- Place of birth: Beira, Mozambique
- Height: 1.83 m (6 ft 0 in)
- Position: Defender

Team information
- Current team: TS Sporting
- Number: 26

Senior career*
Years	Team	Apps	(Gls)
2010	Sporting Beira		
2011–2019	Ferroviário	44	(4)
2012	→ Liga Desportiva de Maputo (loan)		
2019–	TS Sporting	12	(0)

International career^{‡}
2011–	Mozambique	29	(0)
- * Club domestic league appearances and goals as of 23 October 2020 ‡ National team caps and goals as of 22 July 2020

Francisco "Chico" Lopes Albino Muchanga (born 5 November 1991) is a Mozambican footballer who plays as a defender for TS Sporting and the Mozambique national football team.

== Career ==
=== Club ===
In December 2019, Muchanga moved to South African club TS Sporting, signing a two-year contract. He made his league debut for the club on 25 January 2020 in a 0–0 home draw with the University of Pretoria.

=== International ===
Muchanga made his senior international debut on 23 April 2011 in a 2-0 friendly victory over Tanzania.

== Career statistics ==
=== International ===
As of matches played 18 November 2019.

National team	Year	Apps	Goals
Mozambique	2011	4	0
Mozambique	2012	7	0
Mozambique	2013	5	0
Mozambique	2014	2	0
Mozambique	2015	5	0
Mozambique	2018	3	0
Mozambique	2019	3	0
Total		29	0
