= Víctor Guambe =

Mozambican footballer

Personal information
- Date of birth: 8 October 1998 (age 28)
- Place of birth: Maputo, Mozambique
- Height: 1.72 m (5 ft 8 in)
- Position: Goalkeeper

Team information
- Current team: Costa do Sol
- Number: 1

Senior career*
Years	Team	Apps	(Gls)
2016–	Costa do Sol	28	(0)

International career^{‡}
2017–	Mozambique	8	(0)
- * Club domestic league appearances and goals as of 22 July 2020 ‡ National team caps and goals as of 22 July 2020

Víctor Guambe (born 8 October 1998) is a Mozambican footballer who plays as a goalkeeper for Costa do Sol and the Mozambique national football team.

== Career ==
=== International ===
Guambe made his senior international debut on 28 June 2017 in a 2–1 victory over Seychelles at the 2017 COSAFA Cup.

== Career statistics ==
=== International ===
As of matches played 4 August 2019.

National team	Year	Apps	Goals
Mozambique	2017	3	0
Mozambique	2019	4	0
Total		7	0
