= Fasil Gebremichael =

Ethiopian footballer

Personal information
- Full name: Fasil Gebremichael Woldegebriel
- Date of birth: 17 October 2000 (age 26)
- Place of birth: Gondar, Ethiopia
- Height: 1.84 m (6 ft 0 in)
- Position: Goalkeeper

Team information
- Current team: Saint George
- Number: 1

Senior career*
Years	Team	Apps	(Gls)
2020–2021	Sebeta City	11	(0)
2021–2023	Bahir Dar Kenema	35	(0)
2023–	Saint George	6	(0)

International career^{‡}
2021–	Ethiopia	18	(0)
- * Club domestic league appearances and goals as of 17:57, 18 February 2024 (UTC) ‡ National team caps and goals as of 17:57, 27 March 2023 (UTC)

Fasil Gebremichael Woldegebriel (Amharic: ፋሲል ገብረሚካኤል; born 17 October 2000) is an Ethiopian professional footballer who plays as a goalkeeper for Ethiopian Premier League club Saint George and the Ethiopia national team.

== Club career ==
Gebremichael began his senior career with Sebeta City, before transferring to Bahir Dar Kenema in 2021.

== International career ==
Gebremichael made his international debut with the Ethiopia national team in a 0–0 friendly tie with Uganda on 29 August 2021.
