= Mignot Debebe =

Ethiopian footballer (born 1995)

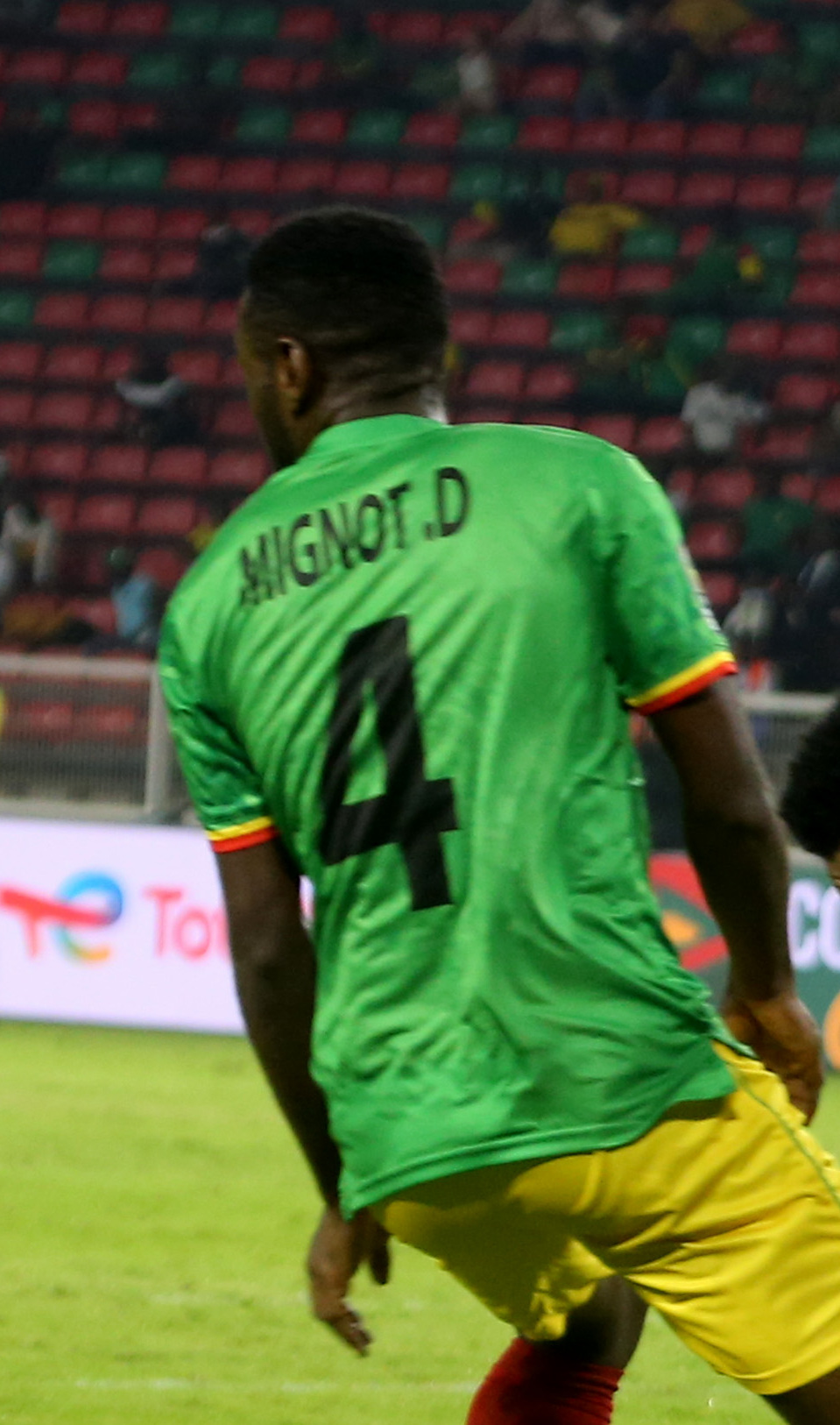
- Debebe with Ethiopia at the 2021 Africa Cup of Nations

Personal information
- Full name: Mignot Debebe Dada
- Date of birth: 2 September 1995 (age 31)
- Place of birth: Arba Minch, Ethiopia
- Height: 1.78 m (5 ft 10 in)
- Position: Centre-back

Team information
- Current team: Fasil Kenema

Senior career*
Years	Team	Apps	(Gls)
2015–2016	Dedebit		
2016–2020	Adama City		
2020–2021	Hawassa City	21	(2)
2021–2023	Saint George	43	(0)
2023–	Fasil Kenema	0	(0)

International career^{‡}
2021–	Ethiopia	19	(0)
- * Club domestic league appearances and goals as of 21:47, 2 July 2023 (UTC) ‡ National team caps and goals as of 21:47, 2 August 2023 (UTC)

Mignot Debebe Dada (Amharic: ምኞት ደበበ; born 2 September 1995) is an Ethiopian professional footballer who plays as a centre-back for Ethiopian Premier League club Fasil Kenema and the Ethiopia national team.

== Club career ==
Born in Arba Minch, Ethiopia, Debebe began his senior career with Dedebit, followed with stints at Adama City and Hawassa City. He joined Saint George in 2021.

== International career ==
Debebe made his international debut with the Ethiopia national team in a 0–0 friendly tie with Sierra Leone on 26 August 2021.
