= Mesud Mohammed =

Ethiopian footballer

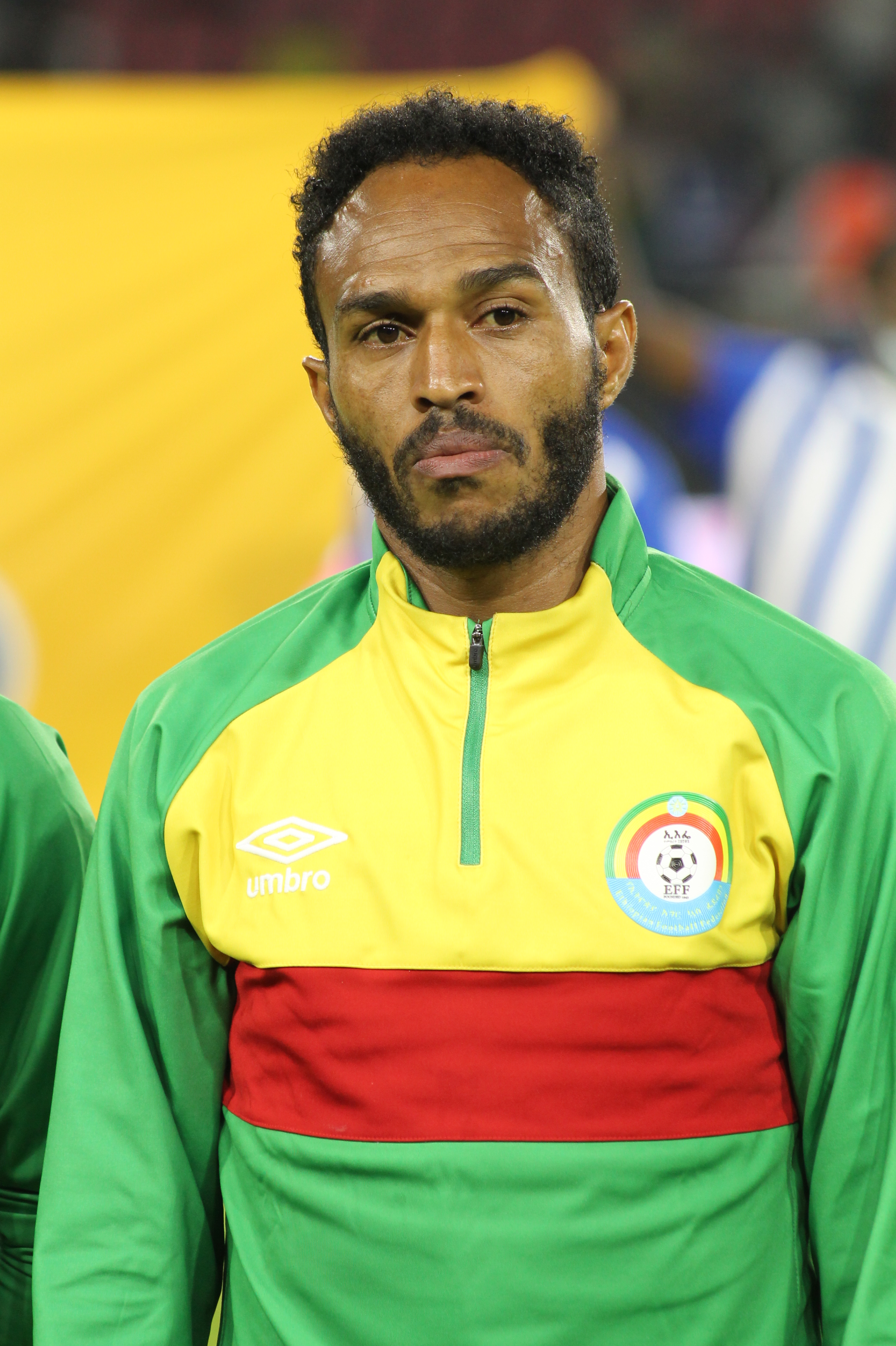
- Mohammed with Ethiopia at the 2021 Africa Cup of Nations

Personal information
- Full name: Mesud Mohammed Mussa
- Date of birth: 18 February 1990 (age 36)
- Place of birth: Addis Ababa, Ethiopia
- Height: 1.75 m (5 ft 9 in)
- Position: Midfielder

Team information
- Current team: Dire Dawa City
- Number: 3

Senior career*
Years	Team	Apps	(Gls)
2007–2010	EEPCO		
2010–2018	Ethiopian Coffee		
2018–2019	Jimma Aba Jifar	5	(0)
2019–2021	Sebeta City	32	(4)
2021–2022	Jimma Aba Jifar	30	(1)
2022–2024	Adama City	38	(1)
2024–	Dire Dawa City	10	(1)

International career
2008–2023	Ethiopia	36	(4)
- * Club domestic league appearances and goals as of 21:47, 14 January 2025 (UTC)

Mesud Mohammed Mussa (Amharic: መስኡድ መሀመድ ሙሳ; born 18 February 1990) is an Ethiopian professional footballer who plays as a midfielder for Ethiopian Premier League club Dire Dawa City.

== Club career ==
=== EEPCO ===
Mohammed began his career with EEPCO and made his debut in the 2007–08 Ethiopian Premier League season.

=== Ethiopian Coffee ===
On 1 July 2010, Mohammed signed with Ethiopian Coffee. In his first season, he won the 2010–11 Ethiopian Premier League and the 2010 Ethiopian Super Cup. The club also finished as the runner-up in the 2013–14 and 2015–16 seasons.

=== Jimma Aba Jifar ===
On 3 August 2018, after an 8 year stint at Ethiopian Coffee, Mohammed signed with Jimma Aba Jifar.

=== Sebeta City ===
On 3 October 2019, Mohammed signed with Sebeta City.

=== Return to Jimma Aba Jifar ===
On 29 July 2021, Mohammed rejoined Jimma Aba Jifar.

=== Adama City ===
On 18 August 2022, Mohammed signed with Adama City.

== International career ==
Mohammed made his international debut with the Ethiopia national team in a 2–1 2010 FIFA World Cup qualification loss to Rwanda on 8 June 2008.

He then competed for the 2021 Africa Cup of Nations in Cameroon.

== Honours ==
Ethiopian Coffee

- Ethiopian Premier League: 2010–11
