= Chernet Gugesa =

Ethiopian footballer (born 1999)

Chernet Gugsa
Personal information
- Full name: Chernet Gugsa Besha
- Date of birth: 13 September 1999 (age 27)
- Place of birth: Sodo, Ethiopia
- Position: Forward

Team information
- Current team: Bahir Dar Kenema
- Number: 17

Senior career*
Years	Team	Apps	(Gls)
2017–2021	Wolaitta Dicha	37	(6)
2021–2023	Saint George	57	(11)
2023–	Bahir Dar Kenema	20	(7)

International career^{‡}
2021–	Ethiopia	37	(3)
- * Club domestic league appearances and goals as of 14 March 2024 ‡ National team caps and goals as of 31 March 2026

Chernet Gugesa Bosha (Amharic: ቸርነት ጉግሳ ቦሻ; born 13 September 1999) is an Ethiopian professional footballer who plays as a forward for Ethiopian Premier League club Bahir Dar Kenema and the Ethiopia national team.

== International career ==
Chernet made his international debut for the Ethiopia national team in a 0–0 2022 FIFA World Cup qualification tie with Lesotho on 26 August 2021.

== Honours ==
=== Saint George S.C ===
- Ethiopian Premier League: 2020–21
