= 2023 Africa Cup of Nations qualification =

Tournament details
- Dates: 23 March 2022 – 17 October 2023
- Teams: 52 (from 1 confederation)

Tournament statistics
- Matches played: 142
- Goals scored: 348 (2.45 per match)
- Top scorer(s): (Nigeria) Victor Osimhen (10 goals)

The 2023 Africa Cup of Nations qualification matches were organised by the Confederation of African Football (CAF) to decide the participating teams for the 2023 Africa Cup of Nations in Ivory Coast, the 34th edition of the international men's football championship of Africa. A total of 24 teams qualified to play in the final tournament, including Ivory Coast, who qualified automatically as hosts.

== Entrants ==
All 54 CAF member associations entered the competition. The seeding was based on the FIFA World Ranking from 23 December 2021 with teams ranked 1st to 42nd receiving a bye to the qualifying group stage, while the teams ranked 43rd to 54th having to participate in the preliminary round.

The preliminary round draw took place on 21 January 2022, 16:30 WAT (UTC+1), in Douala, Cameroon.

From the December 2021 FIFA World Rankings
Bye to group stage	Participating in preliminary round
1. Senegal (20); 2. Morocco (28); 3. Algeria (29); 4. Tunisia (30); 5. Nigeria (36); 6. Egypt (45); 7. Cameroon (50); 8. Ghana (52); 9. Mali (53); 10. Ivory Coast (56; hosts); 11. Burkina Faso (60); 12. DR Congo (64); 13. South Africa (68); 14. Cape Verde (73); 15. Guinea (81); 16. Uganda (82); 17. Benin (83); 18. Zambia (88); 19. Gabon (89); 20. Congo (97); 21. Madagascar (101); 22. Kenya (102); 23. Mauritania (103); 24. Guinea-Bissau (106); 25. Sierra Leone (108); 26. Namibia (112); 27. Niger (113); 28. Equatorial Guinea (114); 29. Libya (117); 30. Mozambique (118); 31. Zimbabwe (121); 32. Togo (124); 33. Sudan (125); 34. Angola (126); 35. Malawi (129); 36. Central African Republic (130); 37. Tanzania (131); 38. Comoros (132); 39. Rwanda (135); 40. Ethiopia (137); 41. Burundi (140); 42. Liberia (144)	43. Lesotho (145); 44. Eswatini (146); 45. Botswana (148); 46. Gambia (150); 47. South Sudan (167); 48. Mauritius (172); 49. Chad (180); 50. São Tomé and Príncipe (189); 51. Djibouti (192); 52. Somalia (194); 53. Seychelles (197); 54. Eritrea (202)

== Schedule ==
The schedule of the qualifying tournament was as follows.

Round	Matchday	Dates	Matches
Preliminary round	First leg	23–24 March 2022	Team 1 vs. Team 2
Preliminary round	Second leg	27–29 March 2022	Team 2 vs. Team 1
Group stage	Matchday 1	1–13 June 2022	Team 1 vs. Team 2, Team 3 vs. Team 4
Group stage	Matchday 2	1–13 June 2022	Team 2 vs. Team 3, Team 4 vs. Team 1
Group stage	Matchday 3	22–24 March 2023	Team 1 vs. Team 3, Team 2 vs. Team 4
Group stage	Matchday 4	26–29 March 2023	Team 3 vs. Team 1, Team 4 vs. Team 2
Group stage	Matchday 5	14–20 June 2023	Team 2 vs. Team 1, Team 4 vs. Team 3
Group stage	Matchday 6	6–12 September 2023, 17 October 2023	Team 3 vs. Team 2, Team 1 vs. Team 4

== Preliminary round ==
The twelve lowest-ranked teams were drawn into six ties to be played in home-and-away two-legged format. The six winners advanced to the group stage to join the 42 teams which entered directly.

Team 1	Agg.	Team 2	1st leg	2nd leg
Eritrea	awd.	Botswana	Canc.	Canc.
São Tomé and Príncipe	4–3	Mauritius	1–0	3–3
Djibouti	2–5	South Sudan	2–4	0–1
Seychelles	1–3	Lesotho	0–0	1–3
Somalia	1–5	Eswatini	0–3	1–2
Chad	2–3	Gambia	0–1	2–2

== Group stage ==
=== Draw ===
The group stage draw took place on 19 April 2022 at 19:30 SAST (UTC+2) at SuperSport Broadcasting Studios in Johannesburg, South Africa. The 48 national teams involved were divided into twelve groups of four each (from Group A to Group L), which consisted of the 42 teams which entered directly, in addition to the six winners of the preliminary round. The 48 national teams had previously been seeded into four pots of twelve each based on the March 2022 FIFA World Rankings (shown in parentheses). Teams in bold qualified for the final tournament.

Pot 1	Pot 2	Pot 3	Pot 4
**Senegal** (20); **Morocco** (24); **Nigeria** (30); **Egypt** (32); **Tunisia** (35); **Cameroon** (37); **Algeria** (44); **Mali** (52); **Ivory Coast** (53; hosts); **Burkina Faso** (56); **Ghana** (60); **DR Congo** (67)	**South Africa** (69); **Cape Verde** (71); **Guinea** (80); Gabon (81); Benin (84); Uganda (86); **Zambia** (87); Congo (98); **Equatorial Guinea** (99); Madagascar (102); ~~Kenya (104)~~; Sierra Leone (108)	**Namibia** (112); **Mauritania** (113); **Guinea-Bissau** (115); Niger (116); Libya (117); **Mozambique** (119); Malawi (120); Togo (121); ~~Zimbabwe (122)~~; **Gambia** (123); **Angola** (126); Comoros (128)	**Tanzania** (130); Central African Republic (131); Sudan (132); Rwanda (136); Burundi (139); Ethiopia (140); Eswatini (143); Lesotho (145); Botswana (148); Liberia (149); South Sudan (161); São Tomé and Príncipe (189)

The draw started with pot 4 and ended with pot 1; each team drawn was assigned into the first available group alphabetically (A–L) and within the group was placed in the position that corresponded to it according to its pot (i.e. position 1 for teams from pot 1, position 2 for teams from pot 2, position 3 for teams from pot 3 and position 4 for teams from pot 4).

The 2023 Africa Cup of Nations hosts, Ivory Coast, participated in the qualifiers despite the team being guaranteed a spot in the finals, which meant only the best ranked team within their group apart from Ivory Coast qualified for the finals. The Ivory Coast matches and results counted in determining the qualification of the other teams from their group.

Kenya and Zimbabwe were included in the draw despite being temporarily suspended by FIFA from all international football activities. In order to avoid a potential situation where one group contained only two valid teams, the aforementioned sides could thus not be drawn in the same group. On 23 May 2022, CAF announced that both teams had been disqualified from the qualifiers as a result of their suspensions not being lifted by FIFA. Thus, their groups were composed of only three teams, with the group winners and runners-up qualifying to the finals.

The draw ceremony was conducted by the CAF Director of Competitions Samson Adamu, with assistance by former South Africa defender Lucas Radebe and former Ivory Coast striker Salomon Kalou.

Tiebreakers

The teams were ranked according to points (3 points for a win, 1 point for a draw, 0 points for a loss). If tied on points, tiebreakers were applied in the following order (Regulations Article 14):

1. Points in head-to-head matches among tied teams;
2. Goal difference in head-to-head matches among tied teams;
3. Goals scored in head-to-head matches among tied teams;
4. Away goals scored in head-to-head matches among tied teams;
5. If more than two teams were tied, and after applying all head-to-head criteria above, a subset of teams were still tied, all head-to-head criteria above was reapplied exclusively to this subset of teams;
6. Goal difference in all group matches;
7. Goals scored in all group matches;
8. Away goals scored in all group matches;
9. Drawing of lots

=== Group A ===
Pos	Team	Pld	W	D	L	GF	GA	GD	Pts	Qualification	Nigeria	Guinea-Bissau	Sierra Leone	São Tomé and Príncipe
1	Nigeria	6	5	0	1	22	4	+18	**15**	Final tournament	—	0–1	2–1	6–0
2	Guinea-Bissau	6	4	1	1	11	5	+6	**13**	Final tournament	0–1	—	2–1	5–1
3	Sierra Leone	6	1	2	3	10	11	−1	**5**		2–3	2–2	—	2–2
4	São Tomé and Príncipe	6	0	1	5	3	26	−23	**1**		0–10	0–1	0–2	—

Source: CAF

=== Group B ===
Pos	Team	Pld	W	D	L	GF	GA	GD	Pts	Qualification	Burkina Faso	Cape Verde	Togo	Eswatini
1	Burkina Faso	6	3	2	1	8	5	+3	**11**	Final tournament	—	2–0	1–0	0–0
2	Cape Verde	6	3	1	2	8	6	+2	**10**	Final tournament	3–1	—	2–0	0–0
3	Togo	6	2	2	2	8	8	0	**8**		1–1	3–2	—	2–2
4	Eswatini	6	0	3	3	3	8	−5	**3**		1–3	0–1	0–2	—

Source: CAF

=== Group C ===
Pos	Team	Pld	W	D	L	GF	GA	GD	Pts	Qualification	Cameroon	Namibia	Burundi	Kenya
1	Cameroon	4	2	1	1	6	3	+3	**7**	Final tournament	—	1–1	3–0	Canc.
2	Namibia	4	1	2	1	6	6	0	**5**	Final tournament	2–1	—	1–1	Canc.
3	Burundi	4	1	1	2	4	7	−3	**4**		0–1	3–2	—	Canc.
4	Kenya	0	0	0	0	0	0	0	**0**	Disqualified	Canc.	Canc.	Canc.	—

Source: CAF

=== Group D ===
Pos	Team	Pld	W	D	L	GF	GA	GD	Pts	Qualification	Egypt	Guinea	Malawi	Ethiopia
1	Egypt	6	5	0	1	10	3	+7	**15**	Final tournament	—	1–0	2–0	1–0
2	Guinea	6	3	1	2	9	7	+2	**10**	Final tournament	1–2	—	1–0	2–0
3	Malawi	6	1	2	3	4	10	−6	**5**		0–4	2–2	—	2–1
4	Ethiopia	6	1	1	4	5	8	−3	**4**		2–0	2–3	0–0	—

Source: CAF

=== Group E ===
Pos	Team	Pld	W	D	L	GF	GA	GD	Pts	Qualification	Ghana	Angola	Central African Republic	Madagascar
1	Ghana	6	3	3	0	8	3	+5	**12**	Final tournament	—	1–0	2–1	3–0
2	Angola	6	2	3	1	6	5	+1	**9**	Final tournament	1–1	—	2–1	0–0
3	Central African Republic	6	2	1	3	9	7	+2	**7**		1–1	1–2	—	2–0
4	Madagascar	6	0	3	3	1	9	−8	**3**		0–0	1–1	0–3	—

Source: CAF

=== Group F ===
Pos	Team	Pld	W	D	L	GF	GA	GD	Pts	Qualification	Algeria	Tanzania	Uganda	Niger
1	Algeria	6	5	1	0	9	2	+7	**16**	Final tournament	—	0–0	2–0	2–1
2	Tanzania	6	2	2	2	3	4	−1	**8**	Final tournament	0–2	—	0–1	1–0
3	Uganda	6	2	1	3	5	6	−1	**7**		1–2	0–1	—	1–1
4	Niger	6	0	2	4	3	8	−5	**2**		0–1	1–1	0–2	—

Source: CAF

=== Group G ===
Pos	Team	Pld	W	D	L	GF	GA	GD	Pts	Qualification	Mali	Gambia	Republic of the Congo	South Sudan
1	Mali	6	5	0	1	15	2	+13	**15**	Final tournament	—	2–0	4–0	4–0
2	Gambia	6	3	1	2	7	7	0	**10**	Final tournament	1–0	—	2–2	1–0
3	Congo	6	2	1	3	5	10	−5	**7**		0–2	1–0	—	1–2
4	South Sudan	6	1	0	5	5	13	−8	**3**		1–3	2–3	0–1	—

Source: CAF

=== Group H ===
Pos	Team	Pld	W	D	L	GF	GA	GD	Pts	Qualification	Zambia	Côte d'Ivoire	Comoros	Lesotho
1	Zambia	6	4	1	1	12	6	+6	**13 (Note: Head-to-head goal difference: Zambia 1, Ivory Coast –1.)**	Final tournament	—	3–0	2–1	3–1
2	Ivory Coast	6	4	1	1	9	5	+4	**13**	Final tournament	3–1	—	3–1	1–0
3	Comoros	6	2	1	3	6	8	−2	**7**		1–1	0–2	—	2–0
4	Lesotho	6	0	1	5	1	9	−8	**1**		0–2	0–0	0–1	—

Source: CAF

=== Group I ===
Pos	Team	Pld	W	D	L	GF	GA	GD	Pts	Qualification	Democratic Republic of the Congo	Mauritania	Gabon	Sudan
1	DR Congo	6	4	0	2	11	4	+7	**12**	Final tournament	—	3–1	0–1	2–0
2	Mauritania	6	3	1	2	9	7	+2	**10**	Final tournament	0–3 (Note: CAF awarded DR Congo a 3–0 win as a result of Mauritania fielding an ineligible player, Khadim Diaw, after the match had ended in a 1–1 draw. Diaw failed to follow the proper procedure for switching national teams after previously representing Senegal during the 2020 African Nations Championship qualification.)	—	2–1	3–0
3	Gabon	6	2	1	3	3	5	−2	**7**		0–2	0–0	—	1–0
4	Sudan	6	2	0	4	3	10	−7	**6**		2–1	0–3	1–0	—

Source: CAF

=== Group J ===
Pos	Team	Pld	W	D	L	GF	GA	GD	Pts	Qualification	Tunisia	Equatorial Guinea	Botswana	Libya
1	Tunisia	6	4	1	1	11	1	+10	**13**	Final tournament	—	4–0	3–0	3–0
2	Equatorial Guinea	6	4	1	1	9	7	+2	**13**	Final tournament	1–0	—	2–0	2–0
3	Botswana	6	1	1	4	3	9	−6	**4**		0–0	2–3	—	1–0
4	Libya	6	1	1	4	2	8	−6	**4**		0–1	1–1	1–0	—

Source: CAF

=== Group K ===
Pos	Team	Pld	W	D	L	GF	GA	GD	Pts	Qualification	Morocco	South Africa	Liberia	Zimbabwe
1	Morocco	4	3	0	1	8	3	+5	**9**	Final tournament	—	2–1	3–0	Canc.
2	South Africa	4	2	1	1	7	6	+1	**7**	Final tournament	2–1	—	2–2	Canc.
3	Liberia	4	0	1	3	3	9	−6	**1**		0–2	1–2	—	Canc.
4	Zimbabwe	0	0	0	0	0	0	0	**0**	Disqualified	Canc.	Canc.	Canc.	—

Source: CAF
Rules for classification: Tiebreakers

=== Group L ===
Pos	Team	Pld	W	D	L	GF	GA	GD	Pts	Qualification	Senegal	Mozambique	Benin	Rwanda
1	Senegal	6	4	2	0	12	4	+8	**14**	Final tournament	—	5–1	3–1	1–1
2	Mozambique	6	3	1	2	8	9	−1	**10**	Final tournament	0–1	—	3–2	1–1
3	Benin	6	1	2	3	8	9	−1	**5**		1–1	0–1	—	1–1
4	Rwanda	6	0	3	3	3	9	−6	**3**		0–1	0–2	0–3 (Note: CAF awarded Benin a 3–0 win as a result of Rwanda fielding an ineligible player, Kevin Muhire, after the match had ended in a 1–1 draw. Muhire failed to serve a one-game ban after receiving two yellow cards in the qualifying competition.)	—

Source: CAF

== Goalscorers ==
There were 348 goals scored in 142 matches, for an average of 2.45 goals per match.

10 goals

- (Nigeria) Victor Osimhen

5 goals

- (Central African Republic) Louis Mafouta
- (Senegal) Sadio Mané
- (Tunisia) Youssef Msakni
- (Zambia) Patson Daka

4 goals

- (Burkina Faso) Dango Ouattara
- (Namibia) Peter Shalulile
- (São Tomé and Príncipe) Luís Leal

3 goals

- (Algeria) Mohamed Amoura
- (Eswatini) Sabelo Ndzinisa
- (Ghana) Mohammed Kudus
- (Guinea-Bissau) Zinho Gano
- (Guinea-Bissau) Jorginho
- (Ivory Coast) Ibrahim Sangaré
- (Mali) Kamory Doumbia
- (Mauritania) Aboubakar Kamara
- (South Africa) Lyle Foster
- (South Sudan) Tito Okello
- (Togo) Kévin Denkey

2 goals

- (Angola) Gelson Dala
- (Benin) Jodel Dossou
- (Benin) Steve Mounié
- (Burundi) Bonfils-Caleb Bimenyimana
- (Cameroon) Vincent Aboubakar
- (Comoros) Youssouf M'Changama
- (Comoros) Benjaloud Youssouf
- (Democratic Republic of the Congo) Cédric Bakambu
- (Democratic Republic of the Congo) Fiston Mayele
- (Egypt) Omar Marmoush
- (Egypt) Mostafa Mohamed
- (Egypt) Mohamed Salah
- (Equatorial Guinea) Federico Bikoro
- (Equatorial Guinea) Emilio Nsue
- (Eswatini) Fanelo Mamba
- (The Gambia) Assan Ceesay
- (The Gambia) Ablie Jallow
- (Ghana) Osman Bukari
- (Guinea) Naby Keïta
- (Ivory Coast) Christian Kouamé
- (Lesotho) Katleho Makateng
- (Malawi) Gabadinho Mhango
- (Mali) Mohamed Camara
- (Mali) Dorgeles Nene
- (Mali) Ibrahima Koné
- (Mali) El Bilal Touré
- (Mauritania) Hemeya Tanjy
- (Morocco) Ayoub El Kaabi
- (Morocco) Youssef En-Nesyri
- (Mozambique) Geny Catamo
- (Mozambique) Clésio
- (Niger) Daniel Sosah
- (Nigeria) Ademola Lookman
- (Nigeria) Terem Moffi
- (Nigeria) Moses Simon
- (São Tomé and Príncipe) Ricardo Cardoso
- (Senegal) Boulaye Dia
- (Sierra Leone) Mustapha Bundu
- (Sierra Leone) Augustus Kargbo
- (South Africa) Zakhele Lepasa
- (South Sudan) Peter Chol
- (Tanzania) Saimon Msuva
- (Togo) Kodjo Laba
- (Togo) Euloge Placca
- (Tunisia) Haythem Jouini
- (Zambia) Lameck Banda
- (Zambia) Kings Kangwa

1 goal

- (Algeria) Youcef Belaïli
- (Algeria) Ramy Bensebaini
- (Algeria) Baghdad Bounedjah
- (Algeria) Riyad Mahrez
- (Algeria) Aïssa Mandi
- (Angola) Kialonda Gaspar
- (Angola) Lucas João
- (Angola) Felício Milson
- (Angola) M'Bala Nzola
- (Benin) Abdoul Rachid Moumini
- (Benin) Junior Olaitan
- (Botswana) Mbatshi Elias
- (Botswana) Gape Mohutsiwa
- (Botswana) Kabelo Seakanyeng
- (Burkina Faso) Stephane Aziz Ki
- (Burkina Faso) Hassane Bandé
- (Burkina Faso) Issoufou Dayo
- (Burkina Faso) Abdoul Tapsoba
- (Burundi) Abedi Bigirimana
- (Burundi) Hussein Shabani
- (Cameroon) Olivier Kemen
- (Cameroon) Bryan Mbeumo
- (Cameroon) Karl Toko Ekambi
- (Cameroon) Christopher Wooh
- (Cape Verde) Bebé
- (Cape Verde) Gilson Benchimol
- (Cape Verde) Clé
- (Cape Verde) João Paulo Fernandes
- (Cape Verde) Ryan Mendes
- (Cape Verde) Jamiro Monteiro
- (Cape Verde) Kevin Pina
- (Cape Verde) Júlio Tavares
- (Central African Republic) Geoffrey Kondogbia
- (Central African Republic) Karl Namnganda
- (Central African Republic) Isaac Ngoma
- (Central African Republic) Samuel Nlend
- (Chad) Ahmat Abderamane
- (Chad) Ezechiel N'Douassel
- (Comoros) El Fardou Ben Nabouhane
- (Comoros) Ibroihim Djoudja
- (Republic of the Congo) Thievy Bifouma
- (Republic of the Congo) Gabriel Charpentier
- (Republic of the Congo) Silvère Ganvoula
- (Republic of the Congo) Antoine Makoumbou
- (Republic of the Congo) Gaius Makouta
- (Djibouti) Samuel Akinbinu
- (Djibouti) Ibrahim Aden Warsama
- (Democratic Republic of the Congo) Jonathan Bolingi
- (Democratic Republic of the Congo) Théo Bongonda
- (Democratic Republic of the Congo) Gaël Kakuta
- (Democratic Republic of the Congo) Arthur Masuaku
- (Democratic Republic of the Congo) Aaron Tshibola
- (Egypt) Mostafa Fathi
- (Egypt) Tarek Hamed
- (Egypt) Trézéguet
- (Egypt) Zizo
- (Equatorial Guinea) Saúl Coco
- (Equatorial Guinea) José Elo
- (Equatorial Guinea) Iban Salvador
- (Eswatini) Bonginkosi Dlamini
- (Eswatini) Sandile Gamedze
- (Eswatini) Siboniso Ngwenya
- (Ethiopia) Shimelis Bekele
- (Ethiopia) Dawa Hotessa
- (Ethiopia) Kitika Jemma
- (Ethiopia) Kenean Markneh
- (Ethiopia) Abubeker Nassir
- (Gabon) Shavy Babicka
- (Gabon) Didier Ndong
- (Gabon) Lloyd Palun
- (The Gambia) Muhammed Badamosi
- (The Gambia) Hamza Barry
- (The Gambia) Omar Colley
- (The Gambia) Yankuba Minteh
- (The Gambia) Bubacarr Trawally
- (Ghana) Felix Afena-Gyan
- (Ghana) Ernest Nuamah
- (Ghana) Antoine Semenyo
- (Guinea) Mohamed Bayo
- (Guinea) Aguibou Camara
- (Guinea) Morgan Guilavogui
- (Guinea) Serhou Guirassy
- (Guinea) François Kamano
- (Guinea) Ilaix Moriba
- (Guinea) Saïdou Sow
- (Guinea-Bissau) Mama Baldé
- (Guinea-Bissau) Zidane Banjaqui
- (Guinea-Bissau) Franculino Djú
- (Guinea-Bissau) Nito Gomes
- (Guinea-Bissau) Alfa Semedo
- (Ivory Coast) Serge Aurier
- (Ivory Coast) Sébastien Haller
- (Ivory Coast) Franck Kessié
- (Ivory Coast) Jean-Philippe Krasso
- (Lesotho) Tshwarelo Bereng
- (Lesotho) Sera Motebang
- (Liberia) William Jebor
- (Liberia) Mohammed Sangare
- (Liberia) Tonia Tisdell
- (Libya) Saleh Al Taher
- (Libya) Husain Taqtaq
- (Madagascar) Njiva Rakotoharimalala
- (Malawi) Lawrence Chaziya
- (Malawi) Robert Saizi
- (Mali) Kalifa Coulibaly
- (Mali) Aliou Dieng
- (Mali) Sékou Koïta
- (Mali) Adama Malouda Traoré
- (Mauritania) Aly Abeid
- (Mauritania) Nouh Mohamed El Abd
- (Mauritania) Hassan Houbeib
- (Mauritania) Abdallahi Mahmoud
- (Mauritania) Mouhamed Soueid
- (Mauritius) Kévin Bru
- (Mauritius) Dylan Collard
- (Mauritius) Ashley Nazira
- (Morocco) Amine Adli
- (Morocco) Fayçal Fajr
- (Morocco) Amine Harit
- (Morocco) Hakim Ziyech
- (Mozambique) Guima
- (Mozambique) Stanley Ratifo
- (Mozambique) Gildo Vilanculos
- (Mozambique) Witi
- (Namibia) Absalom Iimbondi
- (Namibia) Wendell Rudath
- (Niger) Amadou Sabo
- (Nigeria) Taiwo Awoniyi
- (Nigeria) Samuel Chukwueze
- (Nigeria) Emmanuel Dennis
- (Nigeria) Peter Etebo
- (Nigeria) Kelechi Iheanacho
- (Nigeria) Alex Iwobi
- (Rwanda) Thierry Manzi
- (Rwanda) Gilbert Mugisha
- (Rwanda) Blaise Nishimwe
- (Rwanda) Olivier Niyonzima
- (São Tomé and Príncipe) Eba Viegas
- (Senegal) Mamadou Camara
- (Senegal) Habib Diallo
- (Senegal) Iliman Ndiaye
- (Senegal) Youssouf Sabaly
- (Senegal) Abdoulaye Seck
- (Seychelles) Jean-Yves Perry Ernesta
- (Sierra Leone) Amadou Bakayoko
- (Sierra Leone) Musa Noah Kamara
- (Sierra Leone) Abu Komeh
- (Sierra Leone) Alhassan Koroma
- (Sierra Leone) Jonathan Morsay
- (Sierra Leone) Abubakarr Samura
- (Somalia) Sak Hassan
- (South Africa) Mihlali Mayambela
- (South Sudan) Chol Daniel
- (South Sudan) William Gama
- (South Sudan) Rashid Toha
- (South Sudan) Valentino Yuel
- (Sudan) Mohamed Abdelrahman
- (Sudan) Waleed Al-Shoala
- (Sudan) Muhamed Kome
- (Tanzania) George Mpole
- (Togo) Abdou Ouattara
- (Tunisia) Seifeddine Jaziri
- (Tunisia) Ali Maâloul
- (Tunisia) Naïm Sliti
- (Uganda) Fahad Bayo
- (Uganda) Milton Karisa
- (Uganda) Aziz Kayondo
- (Uganda) Rogers Mato
- (Uganda) Joseph Ochaya
- (Zambia) Enock Mwepu
- (Zambia) Fashion Sakala

1 own goal

- (Botswana) Lebogang Ditsele (against Equatorial Guinea)
- (Botswana) Alford Velaphi (against Tunisia)
- (Ivory Coast) Serge Aurier (against Zambia)
- (Libya) Mohammed Al Tuhami (against Equatorial Guinea)
- (Mali) Boubakar Kouyaté (against South Sudan)
- (Morocco) Munir Mohamedi (against South Africa)
- (Niger) Rahim Alhassane (against Algeria)
- (South Sudan) Rehan Angier (against Gambia)

== Qualified teams ==
The following teams qualified for the final tournament.

Team	Qualified as	Qualified on	Previous appearances in Africa Cup of Nations^{1}
Ivory Coast	Hosts / Group H runners-up	30 January 2019	24 (1965, 1968, 1970, 1974, 1980, 1984, 1986, 1988, 1990, **1992**, 1994, 1996, 1998, 2000, 2002, 2006, 2008, 2010, 2012, 2013, **2015**, 2017, 2019, 2021)
Morocco	Group K winners	24 March 2023	18 (1972, **1976**, 1978, 1980, 1986, 1988, 1992, 1998, 2000, 2002, 2004, 2006, 2008, 2012, 2013, 2017, 2019, 2021)
Algeria	Group F winners	27 March 2023	19 (1968, 1980, 1982, 1984, 1986, 1988, **1990**, 1992, 1996, 1998, 2000, 2002, 2004, 2010, 2013, 2015, 2017, **2019**, 2021)
South Africa	Group K runners-up	28 March 2023	10 (**1996**, 1998, 2000, 2002, 2004, 2006, 2008, 2013, 2015, 2019)
Senegal	Group L winners	28 March 2023	16 (1965, 1968, 1986, 1990, 1992, 1994, 2000, 2002, 2004, 2006, 2008, 2012, 2015, 2017, 2019, **2021**)
Burkina Faso	Group B winners	28 March 2023	12 (1978, 1996, 1998, 2000, 2002, 2004, 2010, 2012, 2013, 2015, 2017, 2021)
Tunisia	Group J winners	28 March 2023	20 (1962, 1963, 1965, 1978, 1982, 1994, 1996, 1998, 2000, 2002, **2004**, 2006, 2008, 2010, 2012, 2013, 2015, 2017, 2019, 2021)
Egypt	Group D winners	14 June 2023	25 (**1957**, **1959**, 1962, 1963, 1970, 1974, 1976, 1980, 1984, **1986**, 1988, 1990, 1992, 1994, 1996, **1998**, 2000, 2002, 2004, **2006**, **2008**, **2010**, 2017, 2019, 2021)
Zambia	Group H winners	17 June 2023	17 (1974, 1978, 1982, 1986, 1990, 1992, 1994, 1996, 1998, 2000, 2002, 2006, 2008, 2010, **2012**, 2013, 2015)
Equatorial Guinea	Group J runners-up	17 June 2023	3 (2012, 2015, 2021)
Nigeria	Group A winners	18 June 2023	19 (1963, 1976, 1978, **1980**, 1982, 1984, 1988, 1990, 1992, **1994**, 2000, 2002, 2004, 2006, 2008, 2010, **2013**, 2019, 2021)
Guinea-Bissau	Group A runners-up	18 June 2023	3 (2017, 2019, 2021)
Cape Verde	Group B runners-up	18 June 2023	3 (2013, 2015, 2021)
Mali	Group G winners	18 June 2023	12 (1972, 1994, 2002, 2004, 2008, 2010, 2012, 2013, 2015, 2017, 2019, 2021)
Guinea	Group D runners-up	20 June 2023	13 (1970, 1974, 1976, 1980, 1994, 1998, 2004, 2006, 2008, 2012, 2015, 2019, 2021)
Ghana	Group E winners	7 September 2023	23 (**1963**, **1965**, 1968, 1970, **1978**, 1980, **1982**, 1984, 1992, 1994, 1996, 1998, 2000, 2002, 2006, 2008, 2010, 2012, 2013, 2015, 2017, 2019, 2021)
Angola	Group E runners-up	7 September 2023	8 (1996, 1998, 2006, 2008, 2010, 2012, 2013, 2019)
Tanzania	Group F runners-up	7 September 2023	2 (1980, 2019)
Mozambique	Group L runners-up	9 September 2023	4 (1986, 1996, 1998, 2010)
DR Congo	Group I winners	9 September 2023	19 (1965, **1968**, 1970, 1972, **1974**, 1976, 1988, 1992, 1994, 1996, 1998, 2000, 2002, 2004, 2006, 2013, 2015, 2017, 2019)
Mauritania	Group I runners-up	9 September 2023	2 (2019, 2021)
Gambia	Group G runners-up	10 September 2023	1 (2021)
Cameroon	Group C winners	12 September 2023	20 (1970, 1972, 1982, **1984**, 1986, **1988**, 1990, 1992, 1996, 1998, **2000**, **2002**, 2004, 2006, 2008, 2010, 2015, **2017**, 2019, 2021)
Namibia	Group C runners-up	12 September 2023	3 (1998, 2008, 2019)

^{1} Bold indicates champions for that year. Italics indicates hosts for that year.
