= Liberia national football team results (2020–present) =

This article provides details of international football games played by the Liberia national football team from 2020 to present.

== Results ==
Key
Win
Draw
Defeat

=== 2021 ===
27 March 2021 Friendly	Saudi Arabia U23	3–2	Liberia	Riyadh, Saudi Arabia
14:30 (UTC±0)	Maran 55'; Al-Ghamdi 84'; Al-Eisa 90+6'	Report	Macauley 72'; Dweh 90+2'	Stadium: Prince Faisal bin Fahd Stadium; Attendance: 0

30 March 2021 Friendly	Saudi Arabia U23	0–0	Liberia	Riyadh, Saudi Arabia
14:05 (UTC±0)		Report		Stadium: Prince Faisal bin Fahd Stadium; Attendance: 0

11 June 2021 Friendly	Mauritania	1–0	Liberia	Tunis, Tunisia
16:30 UTC+1	N'Diaye 64'	Report		Stadium: Stade Chedly Zouiten; Referee: Naim Hosni (Tunisia)

14 June 2021 Friendly	Libya	0–1	Liberia	Tunis, Tunisia
16:30 UTC+1		Report	Dorley 45' (pen.)	Stadium: Stade Chedly Zouiten; Referee: Youssef Essrairi (Tunisia)

17 June 2021 Friendly	Algeria	5–1	Liberia	Oran, Algeria
20:45 UTC+1	Amoura 39', 41', 47', 68'; Messaoudi 84' (pen.)	Report	Dorley 24'	Stadium: Olympic Stadium; Referee: Ibrahim Mutaz (Libya)

3 September 2021 2022 World Cup qualification	Nigeria	2–0	Liberia	Lagos, Nigeria
17:00 UTC+1	Iheanacho 22', 44'	Report		Stadium: Teslim Balogun Stadium; Referee: Kouassi Attisso Attiogbe (Togo)

6 September 2021 2022 World Cup qualification	Central African Republic	0–1	Liberia	Douala, Cameroon
16:00 UTC+0		Report	Sherman 86'	Stadium: Japoma Stadium; Referee: Sekou Ahmed Touré (Guinea)

7 October 2021 2022 World Cup qualification	Liberia	1–2	Cape Verde	Accra, Ghana
13:00 UTC+0	Harmon 45+3'	Report	Monteiro 52'; Rodrigues 90+2'	Stadium: Accra Sports Stadium; Referee: Jean Ouattara (Burkina Faso)

10 October 2021 2022 World Cup qualification	Cape Verde	1–0	Liberia	Mindelo, Cape Verde
15:00 UTC−1	Mendes 90'	Report		Stadium: Estádio Municipal Adérito Sena; Referee: Mohamed Ali Moussa (Niger)

13 November 2021 2022 World Cup qualification	Liberia	0–2	Nigeria	Tangiers, Morocco
17:00 UTC+1		Report	Osimhen 15' (pen.); Musa 90+4' (pen.)	Stadium: Stade Ibn Batouta; Referee: Youssef Essrayri (Tunisia)

16 November 2021 2022 World Cup qualification	Liberia	3–1	Central African Republic	Tangier, Morocco
17:00 UTC+1	Macauley 2'; Wilson 8', 74'	Report	Ngoma 61'	Stadium: Stade Ibn Batouta; Referee: Kalilou Ibrahim Traore (Ivory Coast)

=== 2022 ===
24 March 2022 Friendly	Liberia	0–4	Benin	Antalya, Turkey
16:00 UTC+3		Report	Soukou 11'; Aiyegun 20'; Dossou 45'; Mounié 70'	Stadium: Mardan Sports Complex

27 March 2022 Friendly	Liberia	0–1	Sierra Leone	Antalya, Turkey
16:00 UTC+3		Report	Bakayoko 30'	Stadium: Mardan Sports Complex

29 March 2022 Friendly	Burundi	2–1	Liberia	Antalya, Turkey
13:00 UTC+3		Report		Stadium: Mardan Sports Complex

9 June 2022 2023 AFCON Q	Zimbabwe	Cancelled	Liberia	Zimbabwe
15:00 UTC+2

13 June 2022 2023 AFCON Q	Liberia	0–2	Morocco	Casablanca, Morocco
20:00 UTC+1		Report	Fajr 56' (pen.); En-Nesyri 57'	Stadium: Stade Mohammed V Referee: Mohamed Moussa (Niger)

24 July 2022 2022 African Nations Championship Q	Liberia	0–3	Senegal	Paynesville, Liberia
			Sambou 15'; Ndour 31'; Diouf 34'	Stadium: Samuel Kanyon Doe Sports Complex

30 July 2022 2022 African Nations Championship Q	Senegal	1–2	Liberia	Dakar, Senegal
	Ndour 35'		Kromah; Andrews 88' (pen.)	Stadium: Diamniadio Olympic Stadium

25 September 2022 Friendly	Niger	0–0	Liberia	Alexandria, Egypt
17:00 UTC+2		Report		Stadium: Alexandria Stadium; Referee: Ahmed Gamal (Egypt)

27 September 2022 Friendly	Egypt	3–0	Liberia	Alexandria, Egypt
20:00 UTC+2	Marmoush 38'; Abdelmonem 57'; Koka 90+4' (pen.)	Report		Stadium: Alexandria Stadium; Referee: Youssef Essrairi (Tunisia)

=== 2023 ===
24 March AFCON 2023 qualification	South Africa	2–2	Liberia	Johannesburg, South Africa
18:00 UTC+2	Foster 11' (pen.), 22'	Report	Tisdell 68'; Sangare 90+1'	Stadium: Orlando Stadium; Referee: Bamlak Tessema Weyesa (Ethiopia)

28 March AFCON 2023 qualification	Liberia	1–2	South Africa	Monrovia, Liberia
16:00 UTC+0	Jebor 35'	Report	Lepasa 19'; Mayambela 53'	Stadium: Samuel Kanyon Doe Sports Complex; Referee: Daniel Nii Laryea (Ghana)

17 October AFCON 2023 qualification	Morocco	3–0	Liberia	Agadir, Morocco
20:00 UTC+1	Harit 45+2'; El Kaabi 59' (pen.); Adli 89'	Report		Stadium: Adrar Stadium; Referee: Ahmad Imtehaz Heeralall (Mauritius)

12 September Friendly	Ghana	3–1	Liberia	Accra, Ghana
16:00 UTC+0	Nuamah 52'; Kudus 59'; J. Ayew 82'	Report	Teah 90+1'	Stadium: Accra Sports Stadium; Referee: Kouassi Attiogbe (Togo)

14 October Friendly	Liberia	2–3	Libya	Monrovia, Liberia
14:30 UTC+0	Kamara 45'; Dorley 64'	Report	Eisay 3' (pen.); Boushibah 48'; Salama 66'	Stadium: Samuel Kanyon Doe Sports Complex

17 November 2026 FIFA World Cup qualification	Liberia	0–1	Malawi	Paynesville, Liberia
16:00 UTC+0		Report	Mphasi 78'	Stadium: Samuel Kanyon Doe Sports Complex; Referee: Antoine Effa (Cameroon)

20 November 2026 FIFA World Cup qualification	Liberia	3–0; Awarded (Note: Equatorial Guinea forfeited their first two matches of the group for fielding an ineligible player. The original results were Equatorial Guinea 1–0 Namibia and Liberia 0–1 Equatorial Guinea.)	Equatorial Guinea	Paynesville, Liberia
16:00 UTC+0		Report	Nsue 9'	Stadium: Samuel Kanyon Doe Sports Complex; Attendance: 3,044; Referee: Karim Sabry (Morocco)

=== 2024 ===
20 March AFCON 2025 qualification	Djibouti	0–2	Liberia	Marrakesh, Morocco
22:00 UTC+0		Report	Sangare 23' (pen.); Dorley 35'	Stadium: Marrakesh Stadium; Referee: Mehrez Melki (Tunisia)

26 March AFCON 2025 qualification	Liberia	0–0 (2–0 agg.)	Djibouti	Paynesville, Liberia
16:00 UTC+0		Report		Stadium: Samuel Kanyon Doe Sports Complex; Referee: Karim Sabry (Morocco)
Note: Liberia won 2–0 on aggregate.

5 June 2026 FIFA World Cup qualification	Namibia	1–1	Liberia	Johannesburg, South Africa
18:00 UTC+2	Karuuombe 8'	Report	Sackor 65'	Stadium: Orlando Stadium; Referee: Messie Jessie Oved Nkounkou Mvoutou (Congo)

9 June 2026 FIFA World Cup qualification	São Tomé and Príncipe	0–1	Liberia	Oujda, Morocco
14:00 UTC+1		Report	Sesay 90'	Stadium: Stade municipal d'Oujda; Referee: Andofetra Rakotojaona (Madagascar)

6 September 2025 AFCON qualification	Togo	1–1	Liberia	Lomé, Togo
16:00 UTC+0	Denkey 78'	Report	Gibson 90+2'	Stadium: Stade de Kégué; Referee: Godfrey Nkhakananga (Malawi)

10 September 2025 AFCON qualification	Liberia	0–3	Algeria	Monrovia, Liberia
16:00 UTC+0		Report	Gouiri 17'; Zorgane 25'; Bounedjah 80'	Stadium: Samuel Kanyon Doe Sports Complex

11 October 2025 AFCON qualification	Equatorial Guinea	1–0	Liberia	Malabo, Equatorial Guinea
14:00 UTC+1	Salvador 34' (pen.)	Report		Stadium: Estadio de Malabo; Referee: Ahmed Arajiga (Tanzania)

14 October 2025 AFCON qualification	Liberia	1–2	Equatorial Guinea	Monrovia, Liberia
16:00 UTC+0	Gibson 53'	Report	Nlavo 20'; Dorian Jr. 90+4'	Stadium: Samuel Kanyon Doe Sports Complex; Referee: Brahamou Sadou Ali (Niger)

27 October 2024 African Nations Championship qualification	Sierra Leone	1-2	Liberia	Monrovia, Liberia
16:00 UTC+0	Kalokoh 22'	Report	Kumeh 3'; Kabia 58' (o.g.)	Stadium: Samuel Kanyon Doe Sports Complex

1 November 2024 African Nations Championship qualification	Liberia	1–1 (3-2 agg.)	Sierra Leone	Monrovia, Liberia
16:00 UTC+0	Kumeh 63'	Report	Dumbuya 22'	Stadium: Samuel Kanyon Doe Sports Complex
Note: Liberia won 3–2 on aggregate.

13 November 2025 AFCON qualification	Liberia	1-0	Togo	Monrovia, Liberia
15:00 UTC+0	Sangare 83' (pen.)	Report		Stadium: Samuel Kanyon Doe Sports Complex; Attendance: 8,543; Referee: Mohamed Athoumani (Comoros)

17 November 2025 AFCON qualification	Algeria	5–1	Liberia	Tizi Ouzou, Algeria
16:00 UTC+1	Mandi 20'; Mahrez 29'; Bounedjah 64'; Gouiri 74'; Amoura 90+5'	Report	Dweh 6'	Stadium: Hocine Aït Ahmed Stadium; Referee: Tanguy Mebiame (Gabon)

22 December 2024 African Nations Championship qualification	Liberia	1-1	Senegal	Monrovia, Liberia
16:00 UTC+0	Bilty 81'	Report	Mbaye 75'	Stadium: Samuel Kanyon Doe Sports Complex

28 December 2024 African Nations Championship qualification	Senegal	3-0 (3-2 agg.)	Liberia	Dakar, Senegal
17:00 UTC+0	Ba 3'; Ciss 38'; Mbaye 90+2'	Report		Stadium: Stade Abdoulaye Wade
Note: Senegal won 4–1 on aggregate.

=== 2025 ===
19 March 2026 FIFA World Cup qualification	Liberia	0–1	Tunisia	Paynesville, Liberia
16:00 UTC+0		Report	Mastouri 4'	Stadium: Samuel Kanyon Doe Sports Complex; Referee: Clement Franklin Kpan (Ivory Coast)

24 March 2026 FIFA World Cup qualification	Liberia	2–1	São Tomé and Príncipe	Paynesville, Liberia
16:00 UTC+0	Andrews 4'; Farkarlun 32'	Report	Dola 44'	Stadium: Samuel Kanyon Doe Sports Complex; Referee: Mohamed Ali Moussa (Niger)

4 September 2026 FIFA World Cup qualification	Tunisia	3–0	Liberia	Tunis, Tunisia
20:00 UTC+1	Mastouri 5'; Sassi 66'; Saad 90+4'			Stadium: Hammadi Agrebi Stadium

8 September 2026 FIFA World Cup qualification	Malawi	2–2	Liberia	Lilongwe, Malawi
18:00 UTC+2	Mhango 72'; Yeanaye 80' (o.g.)		Kosiah 3', 61'	Stadium: Bingu National Stadium

9 October 2026 FIFA World Cup qualification	Liberia	3–1	Namibia	Paynesville, Liberia
16:00 UTC+0				Stadium: Samuel Kanyon Doe Sports Complex

13 October 2026 FIFA World Cup qualification	Equatorial Guinea	1–1	Liberia	Malabo, Equatorial Guinea
14:00 UTC+1				Stadium: Estadio de Malabo

15 November Friendly	Guinea	2–0	Liberia	Mohammedia, Morocco
17:30 UTC+1	Sekou Bangoura; Yadaly Diaby 77'	Report		Stadium: El Bachir Stadium

=== 2026 ===
27 March Friendly	Benin	1–0	Liberia	Casablanca, Morocco
16:00 UTC+1	Tosin 85'	Report		Stadium: Père Jégo Stadium; Referee: Jalal Jayed (Morocco)

31 March Friendly	Liberia	2–2	Libya	Casablanca, Morocco
16:00 UTC+1	Dorley 76'; P. Balde 82'	Report	El Maremi 44'; Al-Musrati 45+1'	Stadium: Larbi Zaouli Stadium; Referee: Hamza El Fariq (Morocco)

6 June Friendly	Sierra Leone	1–0	Liberia	Freetown, Sierra Leone
16:00 UTC+0	Jarjue Kabia 67'	Report		Stadium: Bo Stadium

9 June Friendly	Liberia	3–1	Sierra Leone	Paynesville, Liberia
16:00 UTC+0	Teclar 30'; Kosiah 43', 71'	Report	D. Kanu 90+4'	Stadium: Samuel Kanyon Doe Sports Complex
