= 2023 Africa Cup of Nations qualification Group L =

Association football tournament group

Group L of the 2023 Africa Cup of Nations qualification tournament was one of the twelve groups that decided the teams which qualified for the 2023 Africa Cup of Nations finals tournament. The group consisted of four teams: defending champions Senegal, Benin, Mozambique and Rwanda.

The teams played against each other in a home-and-away round-robin format between 2 June 2022 and 9 September 2023.

Senegal and Mozambique, the group winners and runners-up respectively, qualified for the 2023 Africa Cup of Nations.

== Standings ==
Pos	Team	Pld	W	D	L	GF	GA	GD	Pts	Qualification	Senegal	Mozambique	Benin	Rwanda
1	Senegal	6	4	2	0	12	4	+8	14	Final tournament	—	5–1	3–1	1–1
2	Mozambique	6	3	1	2	8	9	−1	10	Final tournament	0–1	—	3–2	1–1
3	Benin	6	1	2	3	8	9	−1	5		1–1	0–1	—	1–1
4	Rwanda	6	0	3	3	3	9	−6	3		0–1	0–2	0–3 (Note: CAF awarded Benin a 3–0 win as a result of Rwanda fielding an ineligible player, Kevin Muhire, after the match had ended in a 1–1 draw. Muhire failed to serve a one-game ban after receiving two yellow cards in the qualifying competition.)	—

Source: CAF
Rules for classification: Tiebreakers

== Matches ==
2 June 2022
18:00 UTC+2

Mozambique	1–1	Rwanda
Ratifo 67'	Report	Nishimwe 65'

FNB Stadium, Johannesburg (South Africa)
Referee: Bamlak Tessema Weyesa (Ethiopia)
4 June 2022
19:00 UTC+0

Senegal	3–1	Benin
Mané 12' (pen.), 22', 60' (pen.)	Report	Olaitan 88'

Diamniadio Olympic Stadium, Dakar
Referee: Alaa Sabry (Egypt)

7 June 2022
19:00 UTC+0

Rwanda	0–1	Senegal
	Report	Mané 90+8' (pen.)

Diamniadio Olympic Stadium, Dakar (Senegal)
Referee: Jean-Jacques Ndala (DR Congo)
8 June 2022
20:00 UTC+1

Benin	0–1	Mozambique
	Report	Catamo 38'

Stade de l'Amitié, Cotonou
Referee: Joseph Odey Ogabor (Nigeria)

22 March 2023
17:00 UTC+1

Benin	1–1	Rwanda
Mounié 82'	Report	Mugisha 13'

Stade de l'Amitié, Cotonou
Referee: Joshua Bondo (Botswana)
24 March 2023
19:00 UTC+0

Senegal	5–1	Mozambique
Sabaly 9'; Mané 15'; Ndiaye 32'; Dia 39'; Diallo 88'	Report	Vilanculos 48'

Diamniadio Olympic Stadium, Dakar
Referee: Mutaz Ibrahim (Libya)

28 March 2023
18:00 UTC+2

Mozambique	0–1	Senegal
	Report	Dia 18'

Estádio do Zimpeto, Maputo
Referee: Jalal Jayed (Morocco)
29 March 2023
15:00 UTC+2

Rwanda	0–3 Awarded (Note: CAF awarded Benin a 3–0 win as a result of Rwanda fielding the ineligible player Kevin Muhire, after the match had ended in a 1–1 draw. Muhire failed to serve a one-game ban after receiving two yellow cards in the qualifying competition.)	Benin
Manzi 71'	Report	Dossou 57'

Kigali Pelé Stadium, Kigali
Referee: Abdulkadir Artan (Somalia)

17 June 2023
20:00 UTC+1

Benin	1–1	Senegal
Moumini 78'	Report	Seck 43'

Stade de l'Amitié, Cotonou
Referee: Jean-Jacques Ndala (DR Congo)
18 June 2023
15:00 UTC+2

Rwanda	0–2	Mozambique
	Report	Catamo 43'; Clésio 90+4'

Stade Huye, Butare
Referee: Mustapha Ghorbal (Algeria)

9 September 2023
15:00 UTC+2

Mozambique	3–2	Benin
Witi 27'; Guima 31'; Clésio 90+5'	Report	Mounié 20'; Dossou 50'

Estádio do Zimpeto, Maputo
Referee: Mohamed Adel (Egypt)
9 September 2023
21:00 UTC+2

Senegal	1–1	Rwanda
Ma. Camara 66'	Report	Niyonzima 90+6'

Stade Huye, Butare (Rwanda)
Referee: Haythem Guirat (Tunisia)

== Goalscorers ==
There were 30 goals scored in 12 matches, for an average of 2.5 goals per match.

5 goals

- (Senegal) Sadio Mané

2 goals

- (Benin) Jodel Dossou
- (Benin) Steve Mounié
- (Mozambique) Geny Catamo
- (Mozambique) Clésio
- (Senegal) Boulaye Dia

1 goal

- (Benin) Abdoul Rachid Moumini
- (Benin) Junior Olaitan
- (Mozambique) Guima
- (Mozambique) Stanley Ratifo
- (Mozambique) Gildo Vilanculos
- (Mozambique) Witi
- (Rwanda) Thierry Manzi
- (Rwanda) Gilbert Mugisha
- (Rwanda) Blaise Nishimwe
- (Rwanda) Olivier Niyonzima
- (Senegal) Mamadou Camara
- (Senegal) Habib Diallo
- (Senegal) Iliman Ndiaye
- (Senegal) Youssouf Sabaly
- (Senegal) Abdoulaye Seck
