= 2023 Africa Cup of Nations qualification Group A =

Association football tournament group

Group A of the 2023 Africa Cup of Nations qualification tournament was one of the twelve groups that decided the teams which qualified for the 2023 Africa Cup of Nations finals tournament. The group consisted of four teams: Nigeria, Sierra Leone, Guinea-Bissau and São Tomé and Príncipe (winners of the preliminary round).

The teams played against each other in a home-and-away round-robin format between 9 June 2022 and 11 September 2023.

Nigeria and Guinea-Bissau, the group winners and runners-up respectively, qualified for the 2023 Africa Cup of Nations.

== Standings ==
Pos	Team	Pld	W	D	L	GF	GA	GD	Pts	Qualification	Nigeria	Guinea-Bissau	Sierra Leone	São Tomé and Príncipe
1	Nigeria	6	5	0	1	22	4	+18	15	Final tournament	—	0–1	2–1	6–0
2	Guinea-Bissau	6	4	1	1	11	5	+6	13	Final tournament	0–1	—	2–1	5–1
3	Sierra Leone	6	1	2	3	10	11	−1	5		2–3	2–2	—	2–2
4	São Tomé and Príncipe	6	0	1	5	3	26	−23	1		0–10	0–1	0–2	—

Source: CAF
Rules for classification: Tiebreakers

== Matches ==
9 June 2022
17:00 UTC+1

Nigeria	2–1	Sierra Leone
Iwobi 16'; Osimhen 41'	Report	Morsay 11'

Moshood Abiola National Stadium, Abuja
Referee: Ibrahim Kalilou Traore (Ivory Coast)
9 June 2022
17:00 UTC+1

Guinea-Bissau	5–1	São Tomé and Príncipe
Semedo 40'; Gano 50', 58'; Banjaqui 80'; Jorginho 87'	Report	Viegas 21'

Adrar Stadium, Agadir (Morocco)
Referee: Adalbert Diouf (Senegal)

13 June 2022
14:00 UTC+1

São Tomé and Príncipe	0–10	Nigeria
	Report	Osimhen 9', 48', 65', 84'; Simon 28'; Moffi 43', 60'; Etebo 55'; Lookman 63'; Dennis 90+2' (pen.)

Adrar Stadium, Agadir (Morocco)
Referee: Osiase Koto (Lesotho)
13 June 2022
16:00 UTC+0

Sierra Leone	2–2	Guinea-Bissau
Kargbo 78'; Mu. Kamara 87'	Report	Jorginho 49', 52'

General Lansana Conté Stadium, Conakry (Guinea)
Referee: Abdulwahid Huraywidah (Libya)

22 March 2023
16:00 UTC+0

Sierra Leone	2–2	São Tomé and Príncipe
Bundu 48'; Komeh 78'	Report	Leal 43', 59'

Adrar Stadium, Agadir (Morocco)
Referee: Mawabwe Bodjona (Togo)
24 March 2023
17:00 UTC+1

Nigeria	0–1	Guinea-Bissau
	Report	M. Baldé 29'

Moshood Abiola National Stadium, Abuja
Referee: Mahmoud El Banna (Egypt)

26 March 2023
16:00 UTC+0

São Tomé and Príncipe	0–2	Sierra Leone
	Report	Samura 7'; Alh. Koroma 28'

Adrar Stadium, Agadir (Morocco)
Referee: Jean Philippe Vlei Patrick Tanguy (DR Congo)
27 March 2023
16:00 UTC+0

Guinea-Bissau	0–1	Nigeria
	Report	Simon 30' (pen.)

Estádio 24 de Setembro, Bissau
Referee: Samir Guezzaz (Morocco)

14 June 2023
16:00 UTC+0

São Tomé and Príncipe	0–1	Guinea-Bissau
	Report	Gano 55'

Estádio 24 de Setembro, Bissau (Guinea Bissau)
Referee: Jean Ouattara (Burkina Faso)
18 June 2023
16:00 UTC+0

Sierra Leone	2–3	Nigeria
Bundu 41'; Kargbo 84'	Report	Osimhen 19', 32'; Iheanacho 90+5'

Samuel Kanyon Doe Sports Complex, Monrovia (Liberia)
Referee: Mahmood Ismail (Sudan)

10 September 2023
17:00 UTC+1

Nigeria	6–0	São Tomé and Príncipe
Osimhen 13', 69' (pen.), 79'; Lookman 27'; Awoniyi 51'; Chukwueze 84'	Report

Godswill Akpabio International Stadium, Uyo
Referee: Lahlou Benbraham (Algeria)
11 September 2023
16:00 UTC+0

Guinea-Bissau	2–1	Sierra Leone
Nito 35'; Franculino 48'	Report	Bakayoko 6'

Estádio 24 de Setembro, Bissau
Referee: Boubou Traoré (Mali)

== Goalscorers ==
There were 46 goals scored in 12 matches, for an average of 3.83 goals per match.

10 goals

- (Nigeria) Victor Osimhen

3 goals

- (Guinea-Bissau) Zinho Gano
- (Guinea-Bissau) Jorginho

2 goals

- (Nigeria) Ademola Lookman
- (Nigeria) Terem Moffi
- (Nigeria) Moses Simon
- (São Tomé and Príncipe) Luís Leal
- (Sierra Leone) Mustapha Bundu
- (Sierra Leone) Augustus Kargbo

1 goal

- (Guinea-Bissau) Mama Baldé
- (Guinea-Bissau) Zidane Banjaqui
- (Guinea-Bissau) Franculino Djú
- (Guinea-Bissau) Nito Gomes
- (Guinea-Bissau) Alfa Semedo
- (Nigeria) Taiwo Awoniyi
- (Nigeria) Samuel Chukwueze
- (Nigeria) Emmanuel Dennis
- (Nigeria) Peter Etebo
- (Nigeria) Kelechi Iheanacho
- (Nigeria) Alex Iwobi
- (São Tomé and Príncipe) Eba Viegas
- (Sierra Leone) Amadou Bakayoko
- (Sierra Leone) Musa Noah Kamara
- (Sierra Leone) Abu Komeh
- (Sierra Leone) Alhassan Koroma
- (Sierra Leone) Jonathan Morsay
- (Sierra Leone) Abubakarr Samura
