= 2023 Africa Cup of Nations qualification Group B =

Association football tournament group

Group B of the 2023 Africa Cup of Nations qualification tournament was one of the twelve groups that decided the teams which qualified for the 2023 Africa Cup of Nations finals tournament. The group consisted of four teams: Burkina Faso, Cape Verde, Togo and Eswatini (winners of the preliminary round).

The teams played against each other in a home-and-away round-robin format between 3 June 2022 and 10 September 2023.

Burkina Faso and Cape Verde, the group winners and runners-up respectively, qualified for the 2023 Africa Cup of Nations.

== Standings ==
| Pos | Team | Pld | W | D | L | GF | GA | GD | Pts | Qualification | Burkina Faso | Cape Verde | Togo | Eswatini |
|---|---|---|---|---|---|---|---|---|---|---|---|---|---|---|
| 1 | Burkina Faso | 6 | 3 | 2 | 1 | 8 | 5 | +3 | 11 | Final tournament | — | 2–0 | 1–0 | 0–0 |
| 2 | Cape Verde | 6 | 3 | 1 | 2 | 8 | 6 | +2 | 10 | Final tournament | 3–1 | — | 2–0 | 0–0 |
| 3 | Togo | 6 | 2 | 2 | 2 | 8 | 8 | 0 | 8 | | 1–1 | 3–2 | — | 2–2 |
| 4 | Eswatini | 6 | 0 | 3 | 3 | 3 | 8 | −5 | 3 | | 1–3 | 0–1 | 0–2 | — |

Source: CAF
Rules for classification: Tiebreakers

== Matches ==
3 June 2022
16:00 UTC+0

| Togo | 2–2 | Eswatini |
|---|---|---|
| Placca 20'; Laba 87' | Report | Ndzinisa 84'; Ngwenya 90+5' |

Stade de Kégué, Lomé
Referee: Djindo Louis Houngnandande (Benin)
3 June 2022
20:00 UTC+1

| Burkina Faso | 2–0 | Cape Verde |
|---|---|---|
| Bandé 58'; D. Ouattara 88' | Report |

Stade de Marrakech, Marrakesh (Morocco)
Referee: Daniel Nii Laryea (Ghana)

7 June 2022
15:00 UTC+2

| Eswatini | 1–3 | Burkina Faso |
|---|---|---|
| Ndzinisa 64' | Report | D. Ouattara 69', 75'; Aziz Ki 85' |

FNB Stadium, Johannesburg (South Africa)
Referee: Easter Zimba (Malawi)
7 June 2022
18:30 UTC+1

| Cape Verde | 2–0 | Togo |
|---|---|---|
| J. Tavares 10'; Monteiro 90+4' | Report |

Stade de Marrakech, Marrakesh (Morocco)
Referee: Mehrez Melki (Tunisia)

24 March 2023
15:00 UTC−1

| Cape Verde | 0–0 | Eswatini |
|---|---|---|
| | Report |

Estádio Nacional de Cabo Verde, Praia
Referee: Charles Benle Bulu (Ghana)
24 March 2023
19:00 UTC+0

| Burkina Faso | 1–0 | Togo |
|---|---|---|
| A. Tapsoba 87' | Report |

Stade de Marrakech, Marrakesh (Morocco)
Referee: Maguette Ndiaye (Senegal)

28 March 2023
15:00 UTC+2

| Eswatini | 0–1 | Cape Verde |
|---|---|---|
| | Report | Mendes 56' |

Mbombela Stadium, Mbombela (South Africa)
Referee: Jean Claude Ishimwe (Rwanda)
28 March 2023
19:00 UTC+0

| Togo | 1–1 | Burkina Faso |
|---|---|---|
| Laba 26' | Report | D. Ouattara 12' |

Stade de Kégué, Lomé
Referee: Bakary Gassama (Gambia)

18 June 2023
17:00 UTC+2

| Eswatini | 0–2 | Togo |
|---|---|---|
| | Report | Denkey 14'; Placca 90+2' |

Mbombela Stadium, Mbombela (South Africa)
Referee: Peter Waweru (Kenya)
18 June 2023
15:00 UTC−1

| Cape Verde | 3–1 | Burkina Faso |
|---|---|---|
| Bebé 7'; Fernandes 67'; Clé 90+4' | Report | Dayo 45+3' |

Estádio Nacional de Cabo Verde, Praia
Referee: Haythem Guirat (Tunisia)

8 September 2023
20:00 UTC+1

| Burkina Faso | 0–0 | Eswatini |
|---|---|---|
| | Report |

Stade de Marrakech, Marrakesh (Morocco)
Referee: Amin Omar (Egypt)
10 September 2023
16:00 UTC+0

| Togo | 3–2 | Cape Verde |
|---|---|---|
| Denkey 40' (pen.), 77'; Ouattara 87' | Report | Pina 4'; Benchimol 20' |

Stade de Kégué, Lomé
Referee: Mutaz Ibrahim (Libya)

== Goalscorers ==
There were 27 goals scored in 12 matches, for an average of 2.25 goals per match.

4 goals

- (Burkina Faso) Dango Ouattara

3 goals

- (Togo) Kévin Denkey

2 goals

- (Eswatini) Sabelo Ndzinisa
- (Togo) Kodjo Laba
- (Togo) Euloge Placca

1 goal

- (Burkina Faso) Stephane Aziz Ki
- (Burkina Faso) Hassane Bandé
- (Burkina Faso) Issoufou Dayo
- (Burkina Faso) Abdoul Tapsoba
- (Cape Verde) Bebé
- (Cape Verde) Gilson Benchimol
- (Cape Verde) Clé
- (Cape Verde) João Paulo Fernandes
- (Cape Verde) Ryan Mendes
- (Cape Verde) Jamiro Monteiro
- (Cape Verde) Kevin Pina
- (Cape Verde) Júlio Tavares
- (Eswatini) Siboniso Ngwenya
- (Togo) Abdou Ouattara
