= 2023 Africa Cup of Nations qualification Group C =

Association football tournament group

Group C of the 2023 Africa Cup of Nations qualification tournament was one of the twelve groups that decided the teams which qualified for the 2023 Africa Cup of Nations finals tournament. The group initially consisted of four teams: Cameroon, Kenya, Namibia and Burundi. However, on 23 May 2022, CAF announced that Kenya were disqualified from the qualifiers due to the continued suspension of the Football Kenya Federation by FIFA. The group thus went ahead with only the remaining three teams.

The teams played against each other in a home-and-away round-robin format between 4 June 2022 and 12 September 2023.

Cameroon and Namibia, the group winners and runners-up respectively, qualified for the 2023 Africa Cup of Nations.

== Standings ==
Pos	Team	Pld	W	D	L	GF	GA	GD	Pts	Qualification	Cameroon	Namibia	Burundi	Kenya
1	Cameroon	4	2	1	1	6	3	+3	7	Final tournament	—	1–1	3–0	Canc.
2	Namibia	4	1	2	1	6	6	0	5	Final tournament	2–1	—	1–1	Canc.
3	Burundi	4	1	1	2	4	7	−3	4		0–1	3–2	—	Canc.
4	Kenya	0	0	0	0	0	0	0	0	Disqualified	Canc.	Canc.	Canc.	—

Source: CAF
Rules for classification: Tiebreakers

== Matches ==
4 June 2022
15:00 UTC+2

Namibia	1–1	Burundi
Shalulile 10'	Report	Bimenyimana 88'

Orlando Stadium, Johannesburg (South Africa)
Referee: Thulani Sibandze (Eswatini)

9 June 2022
16:00 UTC+3

Burundi	0–1	Cameroon
	Report	Toko Ekambi 30'

National Stadium, Dar es Salaam (Tanzania)
Referee: Souleiman Ahmed Djama (Djibouti)

24 March 2023
21:30 UTC+1

Cameroon	1–1	Namibia
Kemen 72'	Report	Shalulile 26'

Ahmadou Ahidjo Stadium, Yaoundé
Referee: Redouane Jiyed (Morocco)

28 March 2023
15:00 UTC+2

Namibia	2–1	Cameroon
Shalulile 55'; Iimbondi 79'	Report	Aboubakar 90+1'

Dobsonville Stadium, Johannesburg (South Africa)
Referee: Patrice Milazare (Mauritius)

20 June 2023
16:00 UTC+2

Burundi	3–2	Namibia
Bigirimana 1'; Bimenyimana 9'; Shabani 19'	Report	Shalulile 41'; Rudath 85'

National Stadium, Dar es Salaam (Tanzania)
Referee: Boubou Traoré (Mali)

12 September 2023
20:00 UTC+1

Cameroon	3–0	Burundi
Mbeumo 46'; Wooh 59'; Aboubakar 90+3'	Report

Roumdé Adjia Stadium, Garoua
Referee: Abongile Tom (South Africa)

== Goalscorers ==
There were 16 goals scored in 6 matches, for an average of 2.67 goals per match.

4 goals

- (Namibia) Peter Shalulile

2 goals

- (Burundi) Bonfils-Caleb Bimenyimana
- (Cameroon) Vincent Aboubakar

1 goal

- (Burundi) Abedi Bigirimana
- (Burundi) Hussein Shabani
- (Cameroon) Olivier Kemen
- (Cameroon) Bryan Mbeumo
- (Cameroon) Karl Toko Ekambi
- (Cameroon) Christopher Wooh
- (Namibia) Absalom Iimbondi
- (Namibia) Wendell Rudath
