= Mamadou Lamine Camara =

Mamadou Lamine Camara may refer to:

- Mamadou Lamine Camara (born 2003), Senegalese footballer
- Mamadou Lamine Camara (born 2004), Senegalese footballer
