= 2023 Africa Cup of Nations qualification Group I =

Association football tournament group

Group I of the 2023 Africa Cup of Nations qualification tournament was one of the twelve groups that decided the teams which qualified for the 2023 Africa Cup of Nations finals tournament. The group consisted of four teams: DR Congo, Gabon, Mauritania and Sudan.

The teams played against each other in a home-and-away round-robin format between 4 June 2022 and 9 September 2023.

DR Congo and Mauritania, the group winners and runners-up respectively, qualified for the 2023 Africa Cup of Nations.

== Standings ==
Pos	Team	Pld	W	D	L	GF	GA	GD	Pts	Qualification	Democratic Republic of the Congo	Mauritania	Gabon	Sudan
1	DR Congo	6	4	0	2	11	4	+7	12	Final tournament	—	3–1	0–1	2–0
2	Mauritania	6	3	1	2	9	7	+2	10	Final tournament	0–3 (Note: CAF awarded DR Congo a 3–0 win as a result of Mauritania fielding an ineligible player, Khadim Diaw, after the match had ended in a 1–1 draw. Diaw failed to follow the proper procedure for switching national teams after previously representing Senegal during the 2020 African Nations Championship qualification.)	—	2–1	3–0
3	Gabon	6	2	1	3	3	5	−2	7		0–2	0–0	—	1–0
4	Sudan	6	2	0	4	3	10	−7	6		2–1	0–3	1–0	—

Source: CAF
Rules for classification: Tiebreakers

== Matches ==
4 June 2022
19:00 UTC+0

Mauritania	3–0	Sudan
Kamara 27' (pen.), 30'; Mahmoud 77'	Report

Stade Olympique, Nouakchott
Referee: Fabricio Duarte (Cape Verde)
4 June 2022
21:00 UTC+1

DR Congo	0–1	Gabon
	Report	Babicka 23'

Stade des Martyrs, Kinshasa
Referee: Bernard Camille (Seychelles)

8 June 2022
17:00 UTC+1

Gabon	0–0	Mauritania
	Report

Stade de Franceville, Franceville
Referee: Messie Nkounkou (Congo)
8 June 2022
21:00 UTC+2

Sudan	2–1	DR Congo
Al-Shoala 16'; Abdelrahman 86'	Report	Bolingi 90+3'

Al Hilal Stadium, Omdurman
Referee: Joshua Bondo (Botswana)

23 March 2023
20:00 UTC+1

Gabon	1–0	Sudan
Palun 71'	Report

Stade de Franceville, Franceville
Referee: Haythem Guirat (Tunisia)
24 March 2023
15:00 UTC+2

DR Congo	3–1	Mauritania
Kakuta 37'; Bakambu 42'; Masuaku 67'	Report	Abeid 55'

Stade TP Mazembe, Lubumbashi
Referee: Abongile Tom (South Africa)

27 March 2023
22:00 UTC+2

Sudan	1–0	Gabon
Kome 67'	Report

Al Hilal Stadium, Omdurman
Referee: Lotfi Bekouassa (Algeria)
28 March 2023
22:00 UTC+0

Mauritania	0–3 Awarded (Note: CAF awarded DR Congo a 3–0 win as a result of Mauritania fielding the ineligible player Khadim Diaw, after the match had ended in a 1–1 draw. Diaw failed to follow the proper procedure for switching national teams after previously representing Senegal during 2020 African Nations Championship qualification.)	DR Congo
Soueid 57'	Report	Bakambu 9'

Stade Cheikha Ould Boïdiya, Nouakchott
Referee: Sadok Selmi (Tunisia)

18 June 2023
19:00 UTC+1

Gabon	0–2	DR Congo
	Report	Tshibola 34'; Mayele 83'

Stade de Franceville, Franceville
Referee: Amin Omar (Egypt)
20 June 2023
19:00 UTC+1

Sudan	0–3	Mauritania
	Report	El Abd 26'; Houbeib 49'; Tanjy 55'

Adrar Stadium, Agadir (Morocco)
Referee: Mutaz Ibrahim (Libya)

9 September 2023
16:00 UTC+0

Mauritania	2–1	Gabon
Tanjy 30'; Kamara 42'	Report	Ndong 90+1'

Stade Cheikha Ould Boïdiya, Nouakchott
Referee: Mustapha Ghorbal (Algeria)
9 September 2023
17:00 UTC+1

DR Congo	2–0	Sudan
Bongonda 8'; Mayele 87'	Report

Stade des Martyrs, Kinshasa
Referee: Samir Guezzaz (Morocco)

== Goalscorers ==
There were 25 goals scored in 12 matches, for an average of 2.08 goals per match.

3 goals

- (Mauritania) Aboubakar Kamara

2 goals

- (Democratic Republic of the Congo) Cédric Bakambu
- (Democratic Republic of the Congo) Fiston Mayele
- (Mauritania) Hemeya Tanjy

1 goal

- (Democratic Republic of the Congo) Jonathan Bolingi
- (Democratic Republic of the Congo) Théo Bongonda
- (Democratic Republic of the Congo) Gaël Kakuta
- (Democratic Republic of the Congo) Arthur Masuaku
- (Democratic Republic of the Congo) Aaron Tshibola
- (Gabon) Shavy Babicka
- (Gabon) Didier Ndong
- (Gabon) Lloyd Palun
- (Mauritania) Aly Abeid
- (Mauritania) Nouh Mohamed El Abd
- (Mauritania) Hassan Houbeib
- (Mauritania) Abdallahi Mahmoud
- (Mauritania) Mouhamed Soueid
- (Sudan) Mohamed Abdelrahman
- (Sudan) Waleed Al-Shoala
- (Sudan) Muhamed Kome
