= 2023 Africa Cup of Nations qualification Group E =

Association football tournament group

Group E of the 2023 Africa Cup of Nations qualification tournament was one of the twelve groups that decided the teams which qualified for the 2023 Africa Cup of Nations finals tournament. The group consisted of four teams: Ghana, Madagascar, Angola and Central African Republic.

The teams played against each other in a home-and-away round-robin format between 1 June 2022 and 7 September 2023.

Ghana and Angola, the group winners and runners-up respectively, qualified for the 2023 Africa Cup of Nations.

== Standings ==
| Pos | Team | Pld | W | D | L | GF | GA | GD | Pts | Qualification | Ghana | Angola | Central African Republic | Madagascar |
|---|---|---|---|---|---|---|---|---|---|---|---|---|---|---|
| 1 | Ghana | 6 | 3 | 3 | 0 | 8 | 3 | +5 | 12 | Final tournament | — | 1–0 | 2–1 | 3–0 |
| 2 | Angola | 6 | 2 | 3 | 1 | 6 | 5 | +1 | 9 | Final tournament | 1–1 | — | 2–1 | 0–0 |
| 3 | Central African Republic | 6 | 2 | 1 | 3 | 9 | 7 | +2 | 7 | | 1–1 | 1–2 | — | 2–0 |
| 4 | Madagascar | 6 | 0 | 3 | 3 | 1 | 9 | −8 | 3 | | 0–0 | 1–1 | 0–3 | — |

Source: CAF
Rules for classification: Tiebreakers

== Matches ==
1 June 2022
17:00 UTC+1

| Angola | 2–1 | Central African Republic |
|---|---|---|
| Nzola 72'; Gelson 76' | Report | Nlend 32' |

Estádio 11 de Novembro, Luanda
Referee: Celso Armindo Alvação (Mozambique)
1 June 2022
19:00 UTC+0

| Ghana | 3–0 | Madagascar |
|---|---|---|
| Kudus 53'; Afena-Gyan 56'; Bukari 86' | Report |

Cape Coast Sports Stadium, Cape Coast
Referee: Mahamadou Kéïta (Mali)

5 June 2022
16:00 UTC+3

| Madagascar | 1–1 | Angola |
|---|---|---|
| Rakotoharimalala 36' | Report | Gelson 43' |

Mahamasina Municipal Stadium, Antananarivo
Referee: Thando Ndzandzeka (South Africa)
5 June 2022
14:00 UTC+1

| Central African Republic | 1–1 | Ghana |
|---|---|---|
| Namnganda 41' | Report | Kudus 17' |

Estádio 11 de Novembro, Luanda (Angola)
Referee: Pierre Atcho (Gabon)

23 March 2023
16:00 UTC+3

| Madagascar | 0–3 | Central African Republic |
|---|---|---|
| | Report | Ngoma 36'; Mafouta 45', 79' |

Mahamasina Municipal Stadium, Antananarivo
Referee: Samuel Uwikunda (Rwanda)
23 March 2023
16:00 UTC+0

| Ghana | 1–0 | Angola |
|---|---|---|
| Semenyo 90+6' | Report |

Baba Yara Stadium, Kumasi
Referee: Jean-Jacques Ndala (DR Congo)

27 March 2023
14:00 UTC+1

| Central African Republic | 2–0 | Madagascar |
|---|---|---|
| Mafouta 40', 82' | Report |

Stade de la Réunification, Douala (Cameroon)
Referee: Issa Mouhamed (Benin)
27 March 2023
17:00 UTC+1

| Angola | 1–1 | Ghana |
|---|---|---|
| João 51' (pen.) | Report | Bukari 72' |

Estádio 11 de Novembro, Luanda
Referee: Mohamed Marouf Eid Mansour (Egypt)

17 June 2023
14:00 UTC+1

| Central African Republic | 1–2 | Angola |
|---|---|---|
| Kondogbia 46' | Report | Gaspar 12'; Milson 86' |

Stade de la Réunification, Douala (Cameroon)
Referee: Redouane Jiyed (Morocco)
18 June 2023
17:00 UTC+3

| Madagascar | 0–0 | Ghana |
|---|---|---|
| | Report |

Mahamasina Municipal Stadium, Antananarivo
Referee: Patrice Milazare (Mauritius)

7 September 2023
17:00 UTC+1

| Angola | 0–0 | Madagascar |
|---|---|---|
| | Report |

Estádio Nacional da Tundavala, Lubango
Referee: Jalal Jayed (Morocco)
7 September 2023
16:00 UTC+0

| Ghana | 2–1 | Central African Republic |
|---|---|---|
| Kudus 43'; Nuamah 88' | Report | Mafouta 25' |

Baba Yara Stadium, Kumasi
Referee: Peter Waweru (Kenya)

== Goalscorers ==
There were 24 goals scored in 12 matches, for an average of 2 goals per match.

5 goals

- (Central African Republic) Louis Mafouta

3 goals

- (Ghana) Mohammed Kudus

2 goals

- (Angola) Gelson Dala
- (Ghana) Osman Bukari

1 goal

- (Angola) Kialonda Gaspar
- (Angola) Lucas João
- (Angola) Felício Milson
- (Angola) M'Bala Nzola
- (Central African Republic) Geoffrey Kondogbia
- (Central African Republic) Karl Namnganda
- (Central African Republic) Isaac Ngoma
- (Central African Republic) Samuel Nlend
- (Ghana) Ronaldo Afeavo
- (Ghana) Ernest Nuamah
- (Ghana) Antoine Semenyo
- (Madagascar) Njiva Rakotoharimalala
