= 2023 Africa Cup of Nations qualification Group D =

Association football tournament group

Group D of the 2023 Africa Cup of Nations qualification tournament was one of the twelve groups that decided teams which qualified for the 2023 Africa Cup of Nations finals tournament. The group consisted of four teams: Egypt, Guinea, Malawi and Ethiopia.

The teams played against each other in a home-and-away round-robin format between 2 June 2022 and 9 September 2023.

Egypt and Guinea, the group winners and runners-up respectively, qualified for the 2023 Africa Cup of Nations.

== Standings ==
Pos	Team	Pld	W	D	L	GF	GA	GD	Pts	Qualification	Egypt	Guinea	Malawi	Ethiopia
1	Egypt	6	5	0	1	10	3	+7	15	Final tournament	—	1–0	2–0	1–0
2	Guinea	6	3	1	2	9	7	+2	10	Final tournament	1–2	—	1–0	2–0
3	Malawi	6	1	2	3	4	10	−6	5		0–4	2–2	—	2–1
4	Ethiopia	6	1	1	4	5	8	−3	4		2–0	2–3	0–0	—

Source: CAF
Rules for classification: Tiebreakers

== Matches ==
5 June 2022
15:00 UTC+2

Malawi	2–1	Ethiopia
Mhango 10' (pen.), 34' (pen.)	Report	Nassir 68' (pen.)

Bingu National Stadium, Lilongwe
Referee: Abongile Tom (South Africa)
5 June 2022
21:00 UTC+2

Egypt	1–0	Guinea
Mohamed 87'	Report

Cairo International Stadium, Cairo
Referee: Hélder Martins de Carvalho (Angola)

9 June 2022
18:00 UTC+2

Ethiopia	2–0	Egypt
Hotessa 21'; Bekele 39'	Report

Bingu National Stadium, Lilongwe (Malawi)
Referee: Georges Gatogato (Burundi)
9 June 2022
16:00 UTC+0

Guinea	1–0	Malawi
Keïta 90+1'	Report

General Lansana Conté Stadium, Conakry
Referee: Lamin Jammeh (Gambia)

24 March 2023
21:00 UTC+2

Egypt	2–0	Malawi
Salah 20'; Marmoush 45+1'	Report

30 June Stadium, Cairo
Referee: Pierre Atcho (Gabon)
24 March 2023
20:30 UTC+0

Guinea	2–0	Ethiopia
Kamano 39'; Bayo 73'	Report

Stade Mohammed V, Casablanca (Morocco)
Referee: Djindo Louis Houngnandande (Benin)

27 March 2023
19:00 UTC+0

Ethiopia	2–3	Guinea
Markneh 34'; Jemma 90+5'	Report	Keïta 4'; Moriba 42'; Guilavogui 70'

Prince Moulay Abdellah Stadium, Rabat (Morocco)
Referee: Alhadi Allaou Mahamat (Chad)
28 March 2023
15:00 UTC+2

Malawi	0–4	Egypt
	Report	Hamed 4'; Marmoush 16'; Salah 20'; Zizo 50'

Bingu National Stadium, Lilongwe
Referee: Dahane Beida (Mauritania)

14 June 2023
19:00 UTC+1

Guinea	1–2	Egypt
Guirassy 26'	Report	Trézéguet 42'; Mohamed 79'

Stade de Marrakech, Marrakesh (Morocco)
Referee: Daniel Nii Laryea (Ghana)
20 June 2023
16:00 UTC+2

Ethiopia	0–0	Malawi
	Report

Estádio do Zimpeto, Maputo (Mozambique)
Referee: Djindo Louis Houngnandande (Benin)

8 September 2023
19:00 UTC+3

Egypt	1–0	Ethiopia
Fathi 37'	Report

30 June Stadium, Cairo
Referee: Patrice Tanguy Mebiame (Gabon)
9 September 2023
15:00 UTC+2

Malawi	2–2	Guinea
Saizi 23'; Chaziya 88'	Report	A. Camara 56'; Sow 58'

Bingu National Stadium, Lilongwe
Referee: Clement Franklin Kpan (Ivory Coast)

== Goalscorers ==
There were 28 goals scored in 12 matches, for an average of 2.33 goals per match.

2 goals

- (Egypt) Omar Marmoush
- (Egypt) Mostafa Mohamed
- (Egypt) Mohamed Salah
- (Guinea) Naby Keïta
- (Malawi) Gabadinho Mhango

1 goal

- (Egypt) Mostafa Fathi
- (Egypt) Tarek Hamed
- (Egypt) Trézéguet
- (Egypt) Zizo
- (Ethiopia) Shimelis Bekele
- (Ethiopia) Dawa Hotessa
- (Ethiopia) Kitika Jemma
- (Ethiopia) Kenean Markneh
- (Ethiopia) Abubeker Nassir
- (Guinea) Mohamed Bayo
- (Guinea) Aguibou Camara
- (Guinea) Morgan Guilavogui
- (Guinea) Serhou Guirassy
- (Guinea) François Kamano
- (Guinea) Ilaix Moriba
- (Guinea) Saïdou Sow
- (Malawi) Lawrence Chaziya
- (Malawi) Robert Saizi
