= 2023 Africa Cup of Nations qualification Group F =

Association football tournament group

Group F of the 2023 Africa Cup of Nations qualification tournament was one of the twelve groups that decided the teams which qualified for the 2023 Africa Cup of Nations finals tournament. The group consisted of four teams: Algeria, Uganda, Niger and Tanzania.

The teams played against each other in a home-and-away round-robin format between 4 June 2022 and 7 September 2023.

Algeria and Tanzania, the group winners and runners-up respectively, qualified for the 2023 Africa Cup of Nations.

== Standings ==
Pos	Team	Pld	W	D	L	GF	GA	GD	Pts	Qualification	Algeria	Tanzania	Uganda	Niger
1	Algeria	6	5	1	0	9	2	+7	16	Final tournament	—	0–0	2–0	2–1
2	Tanzania	6	2	2	2	3	4	−1	8	Final tournament	0–2	—	0–1	1–0
3	Uganda	6	2	1	3	5	6	−1	7		1–2	0–1	—	1–1
4	Niger	6	0	2	4	3	8	−5	2		0–1	1–1	0–2	—

Source: CAF
Rules for classification: Tiebreakers

== Matches ==
4 June 2022
17:00 UTC+1

Niger	1–1	Tanzania
Sosah 26'	Report	Mpole 1'

Stade de l'Amitié, Cotonou (Benin)
Referee: Komlanvi Aklassou (Togo)
4 June 2022
20:00 UTC+1

Algeria	2–0	Uganda
Mandi 28'; Belaïli 80'	Report

Stade du 5 Juillet, Algiers
Referee: Mohamed Hussein (Egypt)

8 June 2022
16:00 UTC+3

Uganda	1–1	Niger
Karisa 43'	Report	Sabo 71'

St. Mary's Stadium-Kitende, Entebbe
Referee: Tsegay Mogos Teklu (Eritrea)
8 June 2022
19:00 UTC+3

Tanzania	0–2	Algeria
	Report	Bensebaini 45+2'; Amoura 89'

National Stadium, Dar es Salaam
Referee: Mahmood Ismail (Sudan)

23 March 2023
22:00 UTC+1

Algeria	2–1	Niger
Alhassane 54' (o.g.); Mahrez 88'	Report	Sosah 38'

Nelson Mandela Stadium, Algiers
Referee: Mahmood Ismail (Sudan)
24 March 2023
16:00 UTC+2

Uganda	0–1	Tanzania
	Report	Msuva 68'

Suez Canal Stadium, Ismailia (Egypt)
Referee: Ahmad Imtehaz Heeralall (Mauritius)

27 March 2023
17:00 UTC+1

Niger	0–1	Algeria
	Report	Bounedjah 6'

Stade Hammadi Agrebi, Tunis (Tunisia)
Referee: Boubou Traoré (Mali)
28 March 2023
20:00 UTC+3

Tanzania	0–1	Uganda
	Report	Mato 90+1'

National Stadium, Dar es Salaam
Referee: Ibrahim Kalilou Traore (Ivory Coast)

18 June 2023
16:00 UTC+3

Tanzania	1–0	Niger
Msuva 69'	Report

National Stadium, Dar es Salaam
Referee: Mohamed Al Sayd (Egypt)
18 June 2023
16:00 UTC+1

Uganda	1–2	Algeria
Bayo 88'	Report	Amoura 42', 66'

Japoma Stadium, Douala (Cameroon)
Referee: Pierre Atcho (Gabon)

7 September 2023
20:00 UTC+1

Niger	0–2	Uganda
	Report	Kayondo 17'; Ochaya 39'

Stade de Marrakech, Marrakesh (Morocco)
Referee: Jean-Jacques Ndala (DR Congo)
7 September 2023
20:00 UTC+1

Algeria	0–0	Tanzania
	Report

19 May 1956 Stadium, Annaba
Referee: Djindo Louis Houngnandande (Benin)

== Goalscorers ==
There were 20 goals scored in 12 matches, for an average of 1.67 goals per match.

3 goals

- (Algeria) Mohamed Amoura

2 goals

- (Niger) Daniel Sosah
- (Tanzania) Saimon Msuva

1 goal

- (Algeria) Youcef Belaïli
- (Algeria) Ramy Bensebaini
- (Algeria) Baghdad Bounedjah
- (Algeria) Riyad Mahrez
- (Algeria) Aïssa Mandi
- (Niger) Amadou Sabo
- (Tanzania) George Mpole
- (Uganda) Fahad Bayo
- (Uganda) Milton Karisa
- (Uganda) Aziz Kayondo
- (Uganda) Rogers Mato
- (Uganda) Joseph Ochaya

1 own goal

- (Niger) Rahim Alhassane (against Algeria)
