= Dango Ouattara =

Burkinabé footballer (born 2002)

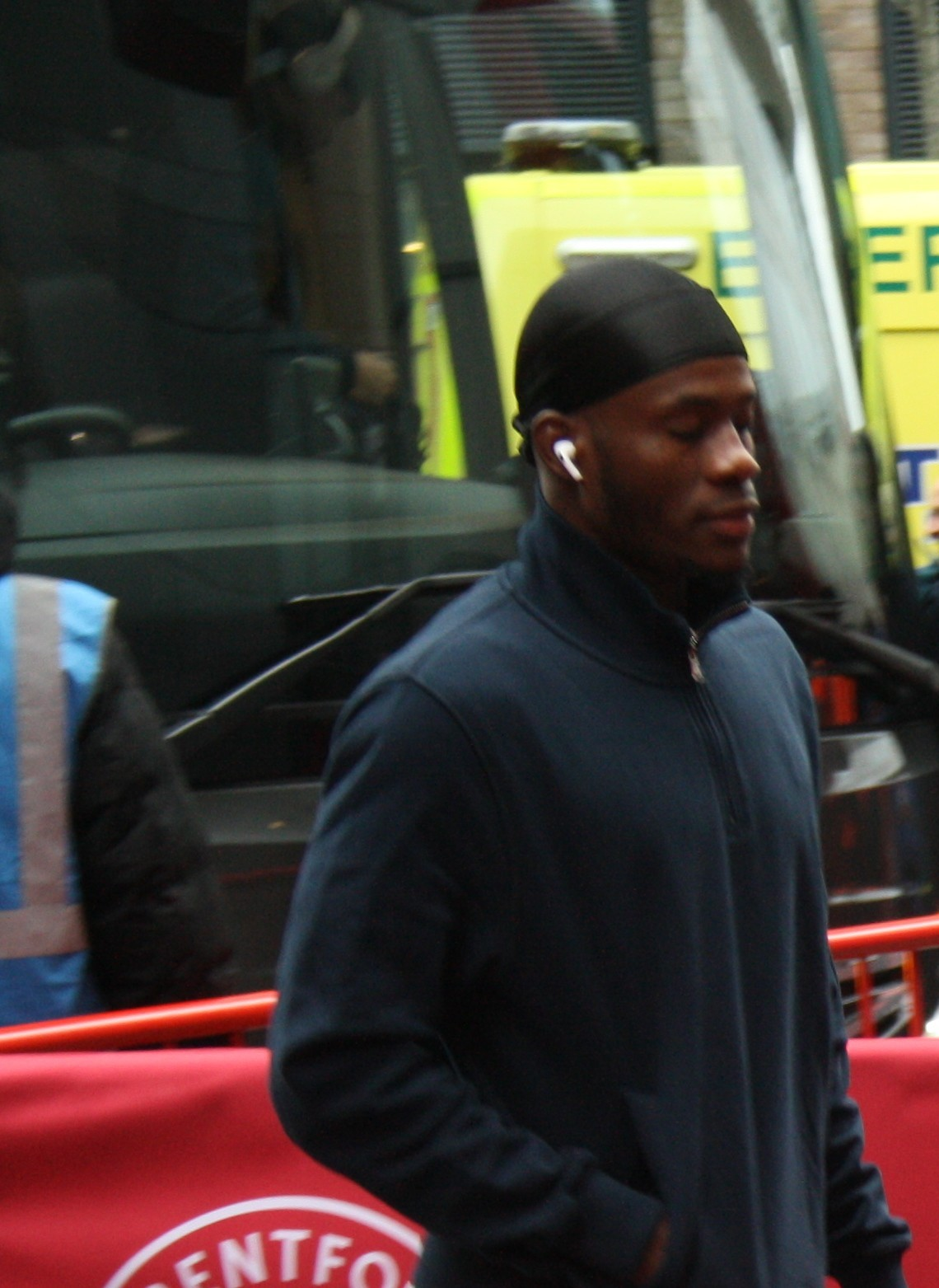
- Ouattara with Brentford in 2025

Personal information
- Full name: Dango Aboubacar Faissal Ouattara
- Date of birth: 11 February 2002 (age 24)
- Place of birth: Ouagadougou, Burkina Faso
- Height: 1.77 m (5 ft 10 in)
- Positions: Right winger; left wing-back

Team information
- Current team: Brentford
- Number: 11

Senior career*
| Years | Team | Apps | (Gls) |
| 2019–2020 | Majestic FC | 11 | (5) |
| 2020–2021 | Lorient B | 5 | (1) |
| 2021–2023 | Lorient | 43 | (7) |
| 2023–2025 | Bournemouth | 81 | (9) |
| 2025– | Brentford | 40 | (8) |

International career^{‡}
| 2021– | Burkina Faso | 46 | (13) |
- * Club domestic league appearances and goals as of 01:24, 26 October 2026 (UTC) ‡ National team caps and goals as of 23:46, 17 November 2026 (UTC)

Dango Aboubacar Faissal Ouattara (born 11 February 2002) is a Burkinabé professional footballer who plays as a right winger or left wing-back for Premier League club Brentford and the Burkina Faso national team.

== Club career ==
=== Lorient ===
A youth product of the Burkinabè club Majestic, Ouattara joined the reserves of Lorient in 2020. He signed his first professional contract with the club on 20 May 2021. He made his professional debut with Lorient in a 1–1 Ligue 1 draw against Saint-Étienne on 8 August 2021. He scored his first goal for the club on 20 April 2022, in a 1–0 win against Metz.

=== Bournemouth ===
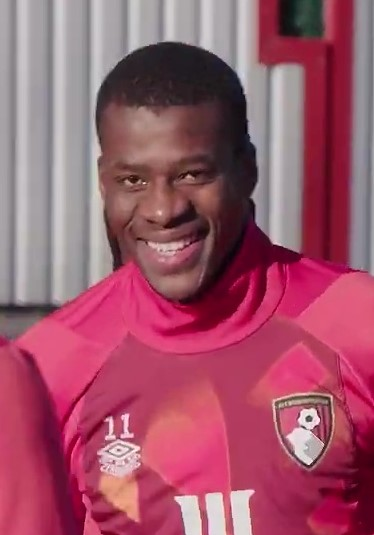
Ouattara training with AFC Bournemouth in 2023

On 19 January 2023, Ouattara joined Premier League side Bournemouth, signing a contract until 2028. He made his debut for the club two days later on 21 January 2023, in a 1–1 draw against Nottingham Forest. He scored his first goal for the Cherries on 15 April 2023, a 95th-minute winner in a 3–2 away victory at Tottenham Hotspur.

On 25 January 2025, Ouattara scored his first professional hat-trick in a 5–0 win over Nottingham Forest in the Premier League.

=== Brentford ===
On 16 August 2025, Ouattara joined fellow Premier League side Brentford on a five-year contract, with the option of a further year. He signed for a club record fee for Brentford, in a deal worth up to £42.5 million. On 23 August 2025, he scored on his debut for the club in a 1–0 win against Aston Villa.

== International career ==
Ouattara received his first call-up to the Burkina Faso national team in November 2021 under Kamou Malo, although he did not feature in the 2022 FIFA World Cup qualification matches.

Pre-selected for the 2021 Africa Cup of Nations the following December, he made his senior international debut on 30 December 2021 in a goalless friendly draw against Mauritania. Ouattara scored his first international goal a few days later in a 3–0 victory over Gabon.

At the 2021 Africa Cup of Nations in Cameroon, he scored a decisive goal in the semi-final against Tunisia, securing a 1–0 win. Starting from his own half, he held off challenges from Oussama Haddadi and Dylan Bronn before scoring the only goal of the match. He was later sent off in the 83rd minute.

On 20 December 2023, he was included in the 27-player Burkina Faso squad selected by Hubert Velud for the 2023 Africa Cup of Nations.

On 8 December 2025, Ouattara was named among the 25 players selected by head coach Brama Traoré to represent Burkina Faso at the 2025 Africa Cup of Nations.

== Personal life ==
Ouattara is a Muslim.

== Career statistics ==
=== Club ===
As of match played 25 October 2026

Appearances and goals by club, season and competition
| Club | Season | League | | | National cup (Note: Includes Coupe de France, FA Cup) | | League cup (Note: Includes EFL Cup) | | Total | |
| Club | Season | Division | Apps | Goals | Apps | Goals | Apps | Goals | Apps | Goals |
|---|---|---|---|---|---|---|---|---|---|---|
| Majestic FC | 2019–20 | Burkinabé Premier League | 11 | 5 | 0 | 0 | — | | 11 | 5 |
| Lorient B | 2020–21 | Championnat National 2 | 2 | 0 | — | | — | | 2 | 0 |
| Lorient B | 2021–22 | Championnat National 2 | 3 | 1 | — | | — | | 3 | 1 |
| Lorient B | Total | | 5 | 1 | — | | — | | 5 | 1 |
| Lorient | 2021–22 | Ligue 1 | 25 | 1 | 1 | 0 | — | | 26 | 1 |
| Lorient | 2022–23 | Ligue 1 | 18 | 6 | 0 | 0 | — | | 18 | 6 |
| Lorient | Total | | 43 | 7 | 1 | 0 | — | | 44 | 7 |
| Bournemouth | 2022–23 | Premier League | 19 | 1 | — | | — | | 19 | 1 |
| Bournemouth | 2023–24 | Premier League | 30 | 1 | 1 | 0 | 1 | 0 | 32 | 1 |
| Bournemouth | 2024–25 | Premier League | 32 | 7 | 4 | 2 | 1 | 0 | 37 | 9 |
| Bournemouth | Total | | 81 | 9 | 5 | 2 | 2 | 0 | 88 | 11 |
| Brentford | 2025–26 | Premier League | 32 | 7 | 2 | 0 | 3 | 0 | 37 | 7 |
| Brentford | 2026–27 | Premier League | 8 | 1 | 0 | 0 | 2 | 0 | 10 | 1 |
| Brentford | Total | | 40 | 8 | 2 | 0 | 5 | 0 | 47 | 8 |
| Career total | | | 180 | 29 | 8 | 2 | 7 | 0 | 195 | 31 |

=== International ===
As of match played 17 November 2026

Appearances and goals by national team and year
| National team | Year | Apps | Goals |
|---|---|---|---|
| Burkina Faso | 2021 | 1 | 0 |
| Burkina Faso | 2022 | 11 | 5 |
| Burkina Faso | 2023 | 7 | 2 |
| Burkina Faso | 2024 | 9 | 3 |
| Burkina Faso | 2025 | 11 | 2 |
| Burkina Faso | 2026 | 7 | 1 |
| Total | | 46 | 13 |

Scores and results list Burkina Faso's goal tally first.

List of international goals scored by Dango Ouattara
| No. | Date | Venue | Cap | Opponent | Score | Result | Competition | Ref. |
|---|---|---|---|---|---|---|---|---|
| 1 | 29 January 2022 | Roumdé Adjia Stadium, Garoua, Cameroon | 5 | Tunisia | 1–0 | 1–0 | 2021 Africa Cup of Nations | |
| 2 | 3 June 2022 | Stade de Marrakech, Marrakech, Morocco | 8 | Cape Verde | 2–0 | 2–0 | 2023 Africa Cup of Nations qualification | |
| 3 | 7 June 2022 | FNB Stadium, Johannesburg, South Africa | 9 | Eswatini | 1–1 | 3–1 | 2023 Africa Cup of Nations qualification | |
| 4 | 7 June 2022 | FNB Stadium, Johannesburg, South Africa | 9 | Eswatini | 2–1 | 3–1 | 2023 Africa Cup of Nations qualification | |
| 5 | 19 November 2022 | Stade de Marrakech, Marrakech, Morocco | 12 | Ivory Coast | 1–0 | 2–1 | Friendly | |
| 6 | 28 March 2023 | Stade de Kégué, Lomé, Togo | 14 | Togo | 1–0 | 1–1 | 2023 Africa Cup of Nations qualification | |
| 7 | 21 November 2023 | Ben M'Hamed El Abdi Stadium, El Jadida, Morocco | 19 | Ethiopia | 3–0 | 3–0 | 2026 FIFA World Cup qualification | |
| 8 | 10 June 2024 | Stade du 26 Mars, Bamako, Mali | 25 | Sierra Leone | 1–0 | 2–2 | 2026 FIFA World Cup qualification | |
| 9 | 10 October 2024 | Alassane Ouattara Stadium, Abidjan, Ivory Coast | 27 | Burundi | 1–1 | 4–1 | 2025 Africa Cup of Nations qualification | |
| 10 | 10 October 2024 | Alassane Ouattara Stadium, Abidjan, Ivory Coast | 27 | Burundi | 3–1 | 4–1 | 2025 Africa Cup of Nations qualification | |
| 11 | 5 September 2025 | Estádio 24 de Setembro, Bissau, Guinea-Bissau | 31 | Djibouti | 5–0 | 6–0 | 2026 FIFA World Cup qualification | |
| 12 | 5 September 2025 | Estádio 24 de Setembro, Bissau, Guinea-Bissau | 31 | Djibouti | 6–0 | 6–0 | 2026 FIFA World Cup qualification | |
| 13 | 28 March 2026 | Stade du 4 Août, Ouagadougou, Burkina Faso | 41 | Guinea-Bissau | 2–0 | 5–0 | Friendly | |
