= Dawa Hotessa =

Ethiopian footballer

Personal information
- Date of birth: 9 March 1996 (age 30)
- Place of birth: Guji Zone, Bore woreda, Oromia region
- Height: 1.87 m (6 ft 2 in)
- Position: Forward

Team information
- Current team: Hadiya Hossana
- Number: 12

Youth career
- Dire Dawa City

Senior career*
Years	Team	Apps	(Gls)
2013–2016	Saint George		
2016–2020	Adama City		
2020–2021	Hadiya Hossana	22	(6)
2021–2023	Adama City	35	(11)
2023–	Hadiya Hossana	11	(2)

International career^{‡}
2014–	Ethiopia	34	(6)
- * Club domestic league appearances and goals as of 10 March 2024 ‡ National team caps and goals as of 26 September 2022

Dawa Hotessa is an Ethiopian professional footballer who plays as a forward for the Ethiopian Premier League club Hadiya Hossana and the Ethiopia national team.

== International career ==
In August 2014, coach Mariano Barreto invited Hotessa to be a part of the Ethiopia squad for the 2015 Africa Cup of Nations qualification.

In August 2018, Hotessa was included in the provisional Ethiopian National team invited by coach Abraham Mebratu for the 2019 African Cup of Nations qualification.

=== International goals ===
Scores and results list Ethiopia's goal tally first.

No.	Date	Venue	Opponent	Score	Result	Competition
1.	7 December 2017	Bukhungu Stadium, Kakamega, Kenya	Burundi	1–1	1–4	2017 CECAFA Cup
2.	13 January 2022	Olembe Stadium, Yaoundé, Cameroon	Cameroon	1–0	1–4	2021 Africa Cup of Nations
3.	30 May 2022	Adama Stadium, Adama, Ethiopia	Lesotho	1–0	1–1	Friendly
4.	9 June 2022	Bingu National Stadium, Lilongwe, Malawi	Egypt	1–0	2–0	2023 Africa Cup of Nations qualification
5.	3 September 2022	Stade Huye, Butare, Rwanda	Rwanda	1–0	1–0	2022 African Nations Championship qualification
6.	26 September 2022	Abebe Bikila Stadium, Addis Ababa, Ethiopia	Sudan	1–0	2–2	Friendly
