= 2023 Africa Cup of Nations qualification Group K =

International football tournament

Group K of the 2023 Africa Cup of Nations qualification tournament was one of the twelve groups that decided the teams which qualified for the 2023 Africa Cup of Nations finals tournament. The group initially consisted of four teams: Morocco, South Africa, Zimbabwe and Liberia. However, on 23 May 2022, CAF announced that Zimbabwe were disqualified from the qualifiers due to the continued suspension of the Zimbabwe Football Association by FIFA. The group thus went ahead with only the three remaining teams.

The teams played against each other in a home-and-away round-robin format between 9 June 2022 and 17 October 2023.

Morocco and South Africa, the group winners and runners-up respectively, qualified for the 2023 Africa Cup of Nations.

== Standings ==
Pos	Team	Pld	W	D	L	GF	GA	GD	Pts	Qualification	Morocco	South Africa	Liberia	Zimbabwe
1	Morocco	4	3	0	1	8	3	+5	9	Final tournament	—	2–1	3–0	Canc.
2	South Africa	4	2	1	1	7	6	+1	7	Final tournament	2–1	—	2–2	Canc.
3	Liberia	4	0	1	3	3	9	−6	1		0–2	1–2	—	Canc.
4	Zimbabwe	0	0	0	0	0	0	0	0	Disqualified	Canc.	Canc.	Canc.	—

Source: CAF
Rules for classification: Tiebreakers

== Matches ==
9 June 2022
20:00 UTC+1

Morocco	2–1	South Africa
En-Nesyri 51'; El Kaabi 88'	Report	Foster 8'

Prince Moulay Abdellah Stadium, Rabat
Referee: Sadok Selmi (Tunisia)

13 June 2022
20:00 UTC+1

Liberia	0–2	Morocco
	Report	Fajr 56' (pen.); En-Nesyri 57'

Stade Mohammed V, Casablanca (Morocco)
Referee: Mohamed Ali Moussa (Niger)

24 March 2023
18:00 UTC+2

South Africa	2–2	Liberia
Foster 11' (pen.), 22'	Report	Tisdell 68'; Sangare 90+1'

Orlando Stadium, Johannesburg
Referee: Bamlak Tessema Weyesa (Ethiopia)

28 March 2023
16:00 UTC+0

Liberia	1–2	South Africa
Jebor 35'	Report	Lepasa 19'; Mayambela 53'

Samuel Kanyon Doe Sports Complex, Monrovia
Referee: Daniel Nii Laryea (Ghana)

17 June 2023
17:00 UTC+2

South Africa	2–1	Morocco
Munir 5' (o.g.); Lepasa 48'	Report	Ziyech 60'

FNB Stadium, Johannesburg
Referee: Alhadi Allaou Mahamat (Chad)

17 October 2023 (Note: The Morocco v Liberia match, originally scheduled to be played on 9 September 2023, was postponed to 17 October 2023 due to the 2023 Marrakesh–Safi earthquake.)
20:00 UTC+1

Morocco	3–0	Liberia
Harit 45+2'; El Kaabi 59' (pen.); Adli 89'	Report

Adrar Stadium, Agadir
Referee: Ahmad Imtehaz Heeralall (Mauritius)

== Goalscorers ==
There were 18 goals scored in 6 matches, for an average of 3 goals per match.

3 goals

- (South Africa) Lyle Foster

2 goals

- (Morocco) Ayoub El Kaabi
- (Morocco) Youssef En-Nesyri
- (South Africa) Zakhele Lepasa

1 goal

- (Liberia) William Jebor
- (Liberia) Mohammed Sangare
- (Liberia) Tonia Tisdell
- (Morocco) Amine Adli
- (Morocco) Fayçal Fajr
- (Morocco) Amine Harit
- (Morocco) Hakim Ziyech
- (South Africa) Mihlali Mayambela

1 own goal

- (Morocco) Munir Mohamedi (against South Africa)
