= Stephane Aziz Ki =

Burkinabe footballer (born 1996)

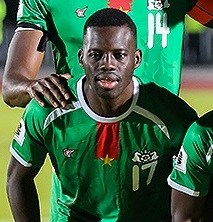
- Aziz Ki with Burkina Faso in 2024

Personal information
- Full name: Stephane Aziz Ki
- Date of birth: 6 March 1996 (age 30)
- Place of birth: Abidjan, Ivory Coast
- Height: 1.75 m (5 ft 9 in)
- Position: Attacking midfielder

Team information
- Current team: Young Africans
- Number: 10

Youth career
- Rayo Vallecano

Senior career*
Years	Team	Apps	(Gls)
2015–2016	San Roque	24	(2)
2017–2018	Omonia	13	(0)
2018	→ Aris Limassol (loan)	5	(0)
2018–2019	Nea Salamina	6	(0)
2019–2021	AFAD Djékanou		
2021–2022	ASEC Mimosas	10	(5)
2022–2025	Young Africans	94	(48)
2025–2026	Wydad	13	(2)
2026-2026	Al-Ittihad Tripoli	2	(1)

International career^{‡}
2017–	Burkina Faso	24	(3)
- * Club domestic league appearances and goals as of 04 November 2026 ‡ National team caps and goals as of 22:10, 11 March 2026 (SAST)

Stephane Aziz Ki (born 6 March 1996) is a professional footballer who plays as an attacking midfielder for NBC Premier League club Young Africans. Born in the Ivory Coast, he plays for the Burkina Faso national team.

== Club career ==
Aziz Ki started his senior career at Spanish side San Roque in 2015. In January 2017, he moved to Cypriot club Omonia, where he had 13 appearances, including seven starts. He later played for fellow Cypriot clubs Aris Limassol on loan and Nea Salamina, before moving to Africa to join Ivorian clubs AFAD Djékanou and ASEC Mimosas, followed by Tanzanian club Young Africans in 2022, and Moroccan Botola side Wydad in 2025.

== International career ==
Aziz Ki was born in Ivory Coast and is of Burkinabé descent. He made his debut for Burkina Faso in a friendly 2–0 loss to Morocco on 24 March 2017. He was named in Burkina Faso's squads for the Africa Cup of Nations in 2023, and 2025.

== Personal life ==
In early January 2026, Aziz Ki suffered a personal tragedy when his young son died after sustaining a head injury during a football match.

== Career statistics ==
=== Club ===
As of match played 24 February 2018

Appearances and goals by club, season and competition
Club	Season	League		Cup		Continental		Total	
Club	Season	Apps	Goals	Apps	Goals	Apps	Goals	Apps	Goals
San Roque	2015–16	24	2	0	0	–		24	2
Omonia	2016–17	13	0	2	0	0	0	2	1
Omonia	2017–18	5	0	0	0	–		5	0
Omonia	Total	18	0	2	0	0	0	20	0
Career total		42	2	2	0	0	0	44	2

=== International ===
No.	Date	Venue	Opponent	Score	Result	Competition
1.	7 June 2022	FNB Stadium, Johannesburg, South Africa	Eswatini	3–1	3–1	2023 Africa Cup of Nations
2.	6 June 2025	National Sports Stadium, Harare, Zimbabwe	Zimbabwe	2–0	2–0	Friendly
