= Clé (footballer) =

Cape Verdean footballer (born 1997)

Personal information
- Full name: Euclides Tavares Andrade
- Date of birth: 12 December 1997 (age 28)
- Place of birth: Tarrafal, Cape Verde
- Height: 1.74 m (5 ft 9 in)
- Position: Forward

Team information
- Current team: Hapoel Petah Tikva
- Number: 77

Senior career*
Years	Team	Apps	(Gls)
2015–2016	Beira-Mar Tarrafal		
2016–2019	Boavista Praia		
2019–2020	Oliveira do Hospital	6	(0)
2020–2024	Os Belenenses	78	(20)
2024	AEZ Zakakiou	16	(3)
2024–2025	Hapoel Kfar Shalem	32	(13)
2025–	Hapoel Petah Tikva	36	(5)

International career^{‡}
2019–	Cape Verde	6	(1)
- * Club domestic league appearances and goals as of 23 June 2026 ‡ National team caps and goals as of 1 June 2025

Euclides Tavares Andrade (born 12 December 1997), known simply as Clé, is a Cape Verdean professional footballer who plays as a forward for Israeli club Hapoel Petah Tikva.

== Club career ==
Born in Brava from the island of Cape Verde.

On 2 July 2025 signed for Liga Leumit club Hapoel Kfar Shalem for one season with option for two more seasons. On 18 February 2025 suspended after tested positive for cannabis.

== Career statistics ==
As of match played 1 June 2025

Appearances and goals by national team and year
National team	Year	Apps	Goals
Cape Verde	2019	1	0
Cape Verde	2023	4	1
Cape Verde	2024	1	0
Total		6	1

Scores and results list Cape Verde's goal tally first, score column indicates score after each Rodrigues goal.

List of international goals scored by Garry Rodrigues
No.	Date	Venue	Opponent	Score	Result	Competition	Ref.
1	18 June 2023	Estádio Nacional de Cabo Verde, Praia, Cape Verde	Burkina Faso	1–0	3–1	2023 Africa Cup of Nations qualification	
