= Osman Bukari =

Ghanaian footballer (born 1998)

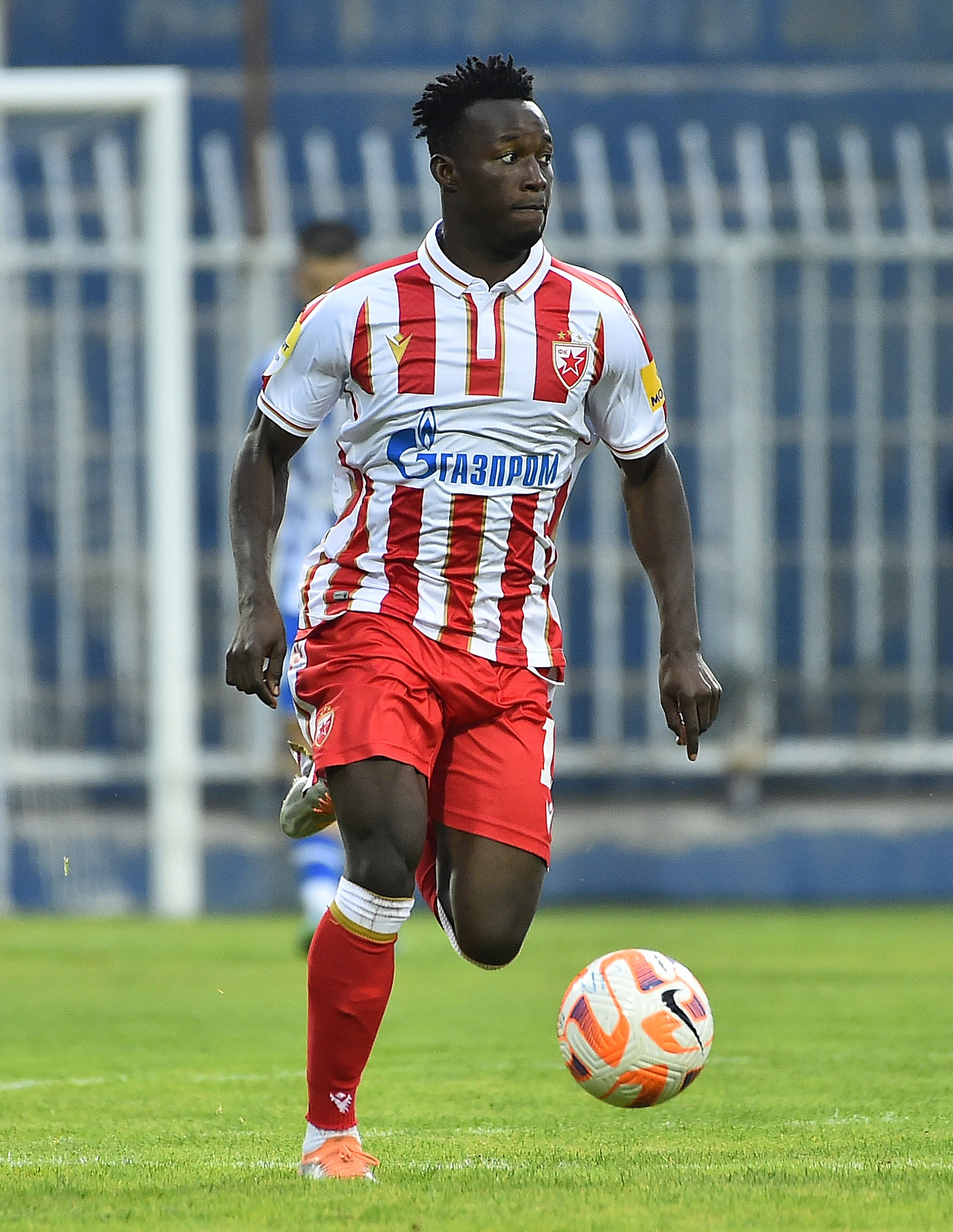
- Bukari with Red Star Belgrade in 2022

Personal information
- Full name: Osman Bukari
- Date of birth: 13 December 1998 (age 27)
- Place of birth: Accra, Ghana
- Height: 1.70 m (5 ft 7 in)
- Position: Right winger

Team information
- Current team: Red Star Belgrade (on loan from Widzew Łódź)
- Number: 14

Youth career
- 2017–2018: Accra Lions
- 2018: → Anderlecht (loan)

Senior career*
Years	Team	Apps	(Gls)
2018–2020	AS Trenčín	51	(12)
2020–2022	Gent	25	(4)
2021–2022	→ Nantes (loan)	24	(2)
2022–2024	Red Star Belgrade	56	(19)
2024–2026	Austin FC	42	(4)
2026–	Widzew Łódź	8	(0)
2026–	→ Red Star Belgrade (loan)	11	(3)

International career^{‡}
2019	Ghana U23	3	(3)
2021–	Ghana	18	(3)
- * Club domestic league appearances and goals as of 21 November 2026 ‡ National team caps and goals as of 21:35, 18 November 2024 (UTC)

Osman Bukari (born 13 December 1998) is a Ghanaian professional footballer who plays as a right winger for Serbian SuperLiga club Red Star Belgrade, on loan from Ekstraklasa club Widzew Łódź, and the Ghana national team.

== Club career ==
=== AS Trenčín ===
The first European club in Osman Bukari's professional career was Slovak side AS Trenčín. Bukari joined them in July 2018 from Accra Lions in his homeland. In his two years in Slovak football, Bukari was one of the best players in his team, playing 66 matches and recording 16 goals and 25 assists. In the 2019–20 season, he was officially Trenčin's best player and was inducted in the league's best XI. He was also on the three-name shortlist for the best player of the season.

=== Gent ===
After his eye-catching performances in Slovakia, Belgian side KAA Gent signed Bukari on 4 September 2020. After signing a three-year contract with Gent, Bukari quickly established himself as one of the first-team regulars. He played in the UEFA Europa League as Gent faced Hoffenheim, Red Star Belgrade and Slovan Liberec in the group stage. He scored four goals and made six assists in 35 appearances for Gent.

==== Loan to Nantes ====
On 12 August 2021, French Ligue 1 outfit FC Nantes signed Bukari on a season-long loan. The Ghanaian was a part of the team that won Coupe de France, the fourth in club's history, and secured European qualification after a 21-year-long wait.

=== Red Star Belgrade ===
Serbian champions Red Star Belgrade signed Bukari on 21 June 2022 in a deal worth €3 million. He made his club debut against Radnički Niš and got on the scoresheet in the same match. He was man of the match with three goals in an assist in Red Star Belgrade's UEFA Champions League qualifying match against Pyunik, in which the Serbian team won 5–0. Bukari scored one of the best goals seen in Eternal derby when he scored with a fine left-footed volley in Red Star Belgrade's 1–1 draw at rivals Partizan.

In their first match at the 2023–24 UEFA Champions League against Manchester City, he scored club's only goal in their 3–1 defeat.

=== Austin FC ===
On 30 May 2024, Bukari was signed by Austin FC for a reported $7 million. He occupied a senior roster, international, and designated player slot for Austin.

=== Widzew Łódź ===
On 19 December 2025, Bukari signed a five-year contract with Polish club Widzew Łódź. The transfer was reportedly the most expensive in Ekstraklasa history, with a fee of €5.5 million.

=== Return to Red Star ===
On 16 July 2026, Bukari joined Serbian SuperLiga club Red Star Belgrade on a one-year loan deal with an option to make transfer permanent. On 21 July 2026, he made his first appearance for Red Star since re-joining the club, as a 46th-minute substitute for Loizos Loizou, and also assisted Vasilije Kostov in a 55th-minute goal, in a 4–0 victory over Larne in the first leg of the second qualifying round of the 2026–27 UEFA Champions League.

== International career ==
Bukari made his Ghana bow on 25 March 2021 against South Africa in an Africa Cup of Nations qualifying match. Good performances on the club level for FC Nantes and Red Star Belgrade earned him a Black Stars recall and he's been a regular for the national team since March 2022. He scored his first goal for his country on 1 June 2022 in an AFCON qualifier against Madagascar. Bukari has been called up by national coach Otto Addo to represent the Black Stars in the 2022 World Cup. In his World Cup debut, Bukari scored in the 90th minute in a 3–2 loss to Portugal, and performed the renowned celebration of their captain Cristiano Ronaldo.

== Personal life ==
He was granted Serbian citizenship by the Serbian government in June 2023.

== Career statistics ==
=== Club ===
As of match played 10 October 2026

Appearances and goals by club, season and competition
Club	Season	League			National cup (Note: Includes Slovak Cup, Belgian Cup, Coupe de France, Serbian Cup, U.S. Open Cup)		Continental		Other		Total	
Club	Season	Division	Apps	Goals	Apps	Goals	Apps	Goals	Apps	Goals	Apps	Goals
AS Trenčín	2018–19	Slovak Super Liga	22	1	4	2	4 (Note: Appearances in UEFA Europa League)	0	2 (Note: Appearance(s) in Slovak First Football League play-offs)	0	32	1
AS Trenčín	2019–20	Slovak Super Liga	25	10	4	1	—		1	0	30	11
AS Trenčín	2020–21	Slovak Super Liga	4	1	0	0	—		—		4	1
AS Trenčín	Total		51	12	8	3	4	0	3	0	66	15
Gent	2020–21	Belgian Pro League	25	4	2	0	7 (Note: One appearance in UEFA Champions League, six appearances in UEFA Europa League)	0	1 (Note: Appearance in Belgian First Division A play-offs)	0	35	4
Nantes (loan)	2021–22	Ligue 1	24	2	2	0	—		—		26	2
Red Star Belgrade	2022–23	Serbian SuperLiga	29	12	4	0	9 (Note: Four appearances and three goals in UEFA Champions League, five appearances in UEFA Europa League)	3	—		42	15
Red Star Belgrade	2023–24	Serbian SuperLiga	27	7	3	1	6 (Note: Appearances in UEFA Champions League)	2	—		36	10
Red Star Belgrade	Total		56	19	7	1	15	5	0	0	78	25
Austin FC	2024	Major League Soccer	9	1	—		—		2 (Note: Appearances in Leagues Cup)	0	11	1
Austin FC	2025	Major League Soccer	33	3	5	2	—		1 (Note: Appearance in MLS Cup playoffs)	0	39	5
Austin FC	Total		42	4	5	2	0	0	3	0	50	6
Widzew Łódź	2025–26	Ekstraklasa	8	0	0	0	—		—		8	0
Red Star Belgrade	2026–27	Serbian SuperLiga	7	1	0	0	6 (Note: Four appearances and one goal in UEFA Champions League, two appearances in UEFA Europa League)	1	—		13	2
Career total			213	42	24	6	32	6	7	0	276	54

=== International ===
As of match played 18 November 2024

Appearances and goals by national team and year
National team	Year	Apps	Goals
Ghana	2021	2	0
Ghana	2022	7	2
Ghana	2023	5	1
Ghana	2024	5	0
Total		19	3

As of match played 27 March 2023. Scores and results list Ghana's goal tally first, score column indicates score after each Bukari goal.

List of international goals scored by Osman Bukari
No.	Date	Venue	Cap	Opponent	Score	Result	Competition
1	1 June 2022	Cape Coast Sports Stadium, Cape Coast, Ghana	5	Madagascar	3–0	3–0	2023 Africa Cup of Nations qualification
2	24 November 2022	Stadium 974, Doha, Qatar	8	Portugal	2–3	2–3	2022 FIFA World Cup
3	27 March 2023	Estádio 11 de Novembro, Talatona, Angola	9	Angola	1–1	1–1	2023 Africa Cup of Nations qualification

== Honours ==
Nantes

- Coupe de France: 2021–22

Red Star Belgrade

- Serbian SuperLiga: 2022–23, 2023–24
- Serbian Cup: 2022–23, 2023–24

Individual

- Slovak Super Liga Team of the Season: 2019–20
- Serbian SuperLiga Player of the Month: April 2023
- Serbian SuperLiga Player of the Week: 2022–23 (Round 22; 31)
