= Hussein Shabani =

Burundian footballer

Personal information
- Full name: Hussein Shabalala Shabani
- Date of birth: 26 September 1990 (age 36)
- Height: 1.73 m (5 ft 8 in)
- Position: Midfielder

Senior career*
Years	Team	Apps	(Gls)
2013–2014	Flambeau de l'Est		
2014–2016	Vital'O		(10)
2016–2017	Amagaju		
2018	Rayon Sports		
2018–2019	Baroka	2	(0)
2019	Ethiopian Coffee		
2019–2020	Bugesera FC		(13)
2020–2023	AS Kigali		(39)
2023–2024	Al Taawon (LBY)		
2024–	AS Kigali		

International career^{‡}
2013–	Burundi	34	(2)
- * Club domestic league appearances and goals as of 23 June 2023 (UTC) ‡ National team caps and goals as of 29 March 2024

Hussein Shabani is a Burundian professional footballer, who plays as a midfielder for AS Kigali FC.

== Club career ==
In January 2019, Shabani joined Ethiopian club, Ethiopian Coffee SC. In August 2019, Shabani moved to Bugesera FC in Rwanda.

== International career ==
Hussein Shabani was invited by Lofty Naseem, the national team coach, to represent Burundi in the 2014 African Nations Championship held in South Africa.

=== International goals ===
Scores and results list Burundi's goal tally first.

No.	Date	Venue	Opponent	Score	Result	Competition
1.	2 September 2018	Awassa Kenema Stadium, Awasa, Ethiopia	Ethiopia	1–0	1–1	Friendly
2.	20 June 2023	Benjamin Mkapa Stadium, Dar Es Salaam, Tanzania	Namibia	3–0	3–2	2023 Africa Cup of Nations qualification
