= Lawrence Chaziya =

Malawian footballer

Personal information
- Date of birth: 19 August 1998 (age 28)
- Place of birth: Malawi
- Height: 1.90 m (6 ft 3 in)
- Position: Centre-back

Team information
- Current team: Mighty Wanderers
- Number: 4

Senior career*
Years	Team	Apps	(Gls)
2016–2022	CIVO United		
2022	Al-Hussein		
2023–	Mighty Wanderers		

International career^{‡}
2021–	Malawi	17	(2)
- * Club domestic league appearances and goals as of 18:26, 9 January 2022 (UTC) ‡ National team caps and goals as of 22:46, 12 December 2024 (UTC)

Lawrence Chaziya (born 19 August 1998) is a Malawian professional footballer who plays as a centre-back for TNM Super League club Mighty Wanderers and Malawi national team.

== Club career ==
Chaziya played for local club CIVO United until 2022. He then joined Al-Hussein of the Jordanian Pro League, signing a contract until the end of the 2022 season.

== International career ==
He made his international debut with the Malawi national team in a 2–1 friendly win over Comoros on 31 December 2021. He was part of the Malawi squads for the 2021 Africa Cup of Nations and the 2024 Four Nations Football Tournament.

== Career statistics ==
=== International ===
As of match played in 10 September 2024

Appearances and goals by national team and year
National team	Year	Apps	Goals
Malawi	2021	1	0
Malawi	2022	5	0
Malawi	2023	8	1
Malawi	2024	3	1
Total		17	2

Scores and results list Malawi's goal tally first, score column indicates score after each Chaziya goal.

List of international goals scored by Lawrence Chaziya
No.	Date	Venue	Opponent	Score	Result	Competition
1	9 September 2023	Bingu National Stadium, Lilongwe, Malawi	Guinea	2–2	2–2	2023 Africa Cup of Nations qualification
2	26 March 2024	Bingu National Stadium, Lilongwe, Malawi	Zambia	1–2	1–2	Friendly
