= Shimelis Bekele =

Ethiopian footballer (born 1990)

Personal information
- Full name: Shimelis Bekele Godo
- Date of birth: 2 January 1990 (age 36)
- Place of birth: Hawassa, Ethiopia
- Height: 1.79 m (5 ft 10 in)
- Position: Attacking midfielder

Team information
- Current team: Defence Force
- Number: 18

Senior career*
Years	Team	Apps	(Gls)
2010–2011	Hawassa City		
2011–2013	Saint George		
2013–2014	Ittihad Tripoli		
2014	Al-Merrikh		
2014–2019	Petrojet	123	(29)
2019–2021	Misr Lel-Makkasa	60	(16)
2021–2022	El Gouna	16	(0)
2022–2023	ENPPI	2	(0)
2023–	Defence Force	8	(2)

International career
2010–2023	Ethiopia	81	(15)
- * Club domestic league appearances and goals as of 10:53, 8 January 2024 (UTC) "Shimelis Bekele".

Shimelis Bekele Godo (Amharic: ሽመልስ በቀለ; born 2 January 1990) is an Ethiopian professional footballer who plays as an attacking midfielder for Ethiopian Premier League club Defence Force. He represented Ethiopia at the 2013 and 2021 Africa Cup of Nations.

== Early life ==
Shimelis Bekele was born in Hawassa, Ethiopia.

== Career statistics ==
Scores and results list Ethiopia's goal tally first, score column indicates score after each Bekele goal.

List of international goals scored by Shimelis Bekele
No.	Date	Venue	Opponent	Score	Result	Competition
1	29 November 2010	National Stadium, Dar es Salaam, Tanzania	Uganda	1–0	1–2	2010 CECAFA Cup
2	2 December 2010	National Stadium, Dar es Salaam, Tanzania	Kenya	1–0	2–1	2010 CECAFA Cup
3	2 December 2010	National Stadium, Dar es Salaam, Tanzania	Kenya	2–0	2–1	2010 CECAFA Cup
4	8 October 2011	Addis Ababa Stadium, Addis Ababa, Ethiopia	Madagascar	4–2	4–2	2012 Africa Cup of Nations qualification
5	16 November 2011	Addis Ababa Stadium, Addis Ababa, Ethiopia	Somalia	2–0	5–0	2014 FIFA World Cup qualification
6	16 November 2011	Addis Ababa Stadium, Addis Ababa, Ethiopia	Somalia	3–0	5–0	2014 FIFA World Cup qualification
7	11 January 2013	Addis Ababa Stadium, Addis Ababa, Ethiopia	Tanzania	2–1	2–1	Friendly
8	14 November 2015	Addis Ababa Stadium, Addis Ababa, Ethiopia	Congo	3–4	3–4	2018 FIFA World Cup qualification
9	19 November 2019	Bahir Dar Stadium, Bahir Dar, Ethiopia	Ivory Coast	2–1	2–1	2021 Africa Cup of Nations qualification
10	24 March 2021	Bahir Dar Stadium, Bahir Dar, Ethiopia	Madagascar	4–0	4–0	2021 Africa Cup of Nations qualification
11	30 December 2021	Limbe Stadium, Limbe, Cameroon	Sudan	3–1	3–2	Friendly
12	9 June 2022	Bingu National Stadium, Lilongwe, Malawi	Egypt	2–0	2–0	2023 Africa Cup of Nations qualification
13	23 September 2022	Abebe Bikila Stadium, Addis Ababa, Ethiopia	Sudan	1–0	1–1	Friendly
14	2 August 2023	Segra Field, Leesburg, United States	Guyana	1–0	2–0	Friendly
15	2 August 2023	Segra Field, Leesburg, United States	Guyana	2–0	2–0	Friendly
