= Tonia Tisdell =

Liberian footballer

Personal information
- Full name: Tonia D. Tisdell
- Date of birth: January 1, 1992 (age 34)
- Place of birth: Monrovia, Liberia
- Height: 1.77 m (5 ft 10 in)
- Position: Left winger

Team information
- Current team: İmişli

Senior career*
Years	Team	Apps	(Gls)
2009–2011	Ankaraspor	0	(0)
2009–2010	→ Karşıyaka (loan)	6	(0)
2011	Ankaragücü	12	(2)
2011	→ Mersin Idmanyurdu (loan)	11	(1)
2012–2019	Osmanlıspor	65	(9)
2012	→ Mersin Idmanyurdu (loan)	8	(1)
2012–2013	→ Şanlıurfaspor (loan)	26	(4)
2016	→ Karşıyaka (loan)	10	(0)
2017–2018	→ Ankaragücü (loan)	8	(0)
2018–2019	Denizlispor	10	(0)
2019–2020	Nea Salamis Famagusta	21	(2)
2020	ENPPI	8	(0)
2022–2023	Mighty Barrolle		
2023–	İmişli		

International career^{‡}
2014–	Liberia	10	(1)
- * Club domestic league appearances and goals as of 19:15, 7 December 2020 (UTC) ‡ National team caps and goals as of 15:11, 27 March 2023 (UTC)

Tonia Tisdell (born March 20, 1994) is a Liberian professional footballer who plays as a left winger for İmişli.

== Club career ==
Tisdell joined Ankaraspor in January 2009 but in summer 2009 was loaned to second division club Karşıyaka S.K. for two seasons. He scored in his first professional match and goal for his club Karşıyaka against Kartalspor in the Turkish Cup.

Mersin İdman Yurdu signed Tisdell on loan until the end of season.

On 5 August 2018, signed a one-year contract with Denizlispor. After six months with Nea Salamis Famagusta FC in Cyprus, Tisdell moved to Egyptian club ENPPI SC at the end of January 2020.

In September 2023, Tisdell signed for Azerbaijan First League team, İmişli.

== International career ==
Tisdell is a member of the Liberia national football team. On 11 October 2008, he played his first match for Liberia against Algeria.

== International goals ==
No.	Date	Venue	Opponent	Score	Result	Competition
1.	24 March 2023	Orlando Stadium, Johannesburg, South Africa	South Africa	1–2	2–2	2023 Africa Cup of Nations qualification
