= Hemeya Tanjy =

Mauritanian footballer (born 1998)

Personal information
- Full name: Hemeya Tanjy
- Date of birth: 1 May 1998 (age 28)
- Place of birth: Teyarett, Mauritania
- Height: 1.76 m (5 ft 9 in)
- Position: Forward

Team information
- Current team: Olympic Zawia

Senior career*
Years	Team	Apps	(Gls)
2016–2018	Tidjikja	41	(31)
2018–2023	Nouadhibou	85	(67)
2023–2024	Al-Ittihad	6	(0)
2024-2025	Al-Hilal	20	(5)
2025–2026	Douanes		
2026–	Olympic Zawia	7	(1)

International career
2016	Mauritania U20	2	(2)
2018	Mauritania U23	0	(0)
2018–	Mauritania	52	(8)
- * Club domestic league appearances and goals

Hemeya Tanjy (born 1 May 1998) is a Mauritanian professional footballer who plays as a forward for Libyan Premier League club Olympic Zawia and the Mauritania national team.

== Club career ==
Tanjy grew up playing street football in the streets of his hometown of Nouakchott. He played for local teams such as Skok Club and Zamzam club before he was discovered by the National Football Academy, where he spent a few years.

Tanjy made his senior debut with topflight club Tidjikja, where he played for three years. He finished as the league's leading scorer in the 2017–18 season.

Tanjy signed a two-year deal with Nouadhibou in June 2018. In his first year with the club, he scored the game-winning goal in the title-clinching match against ASAC Concorde.

He finished as the leading scorer in the 2020–21 season, scoring 19 goals in 18 matches.

In December 2022, Tanjy became the first player in league history to score 100 goals.

== International career ==
Tanjy played for the national under-20 team during the 2017 Africa U-20 Cup of Nations qualifiers in 2016, scoring twice in two matches.

In May 2018, he was named to the 22-man squad selected to play at the 2019 Africa U-23 Cup of Nations qualifiers.

He received a callup up to the senior national team in January 2018 ahead of the 2018 African Nations Championship. He made his senior international debut during the first group stage match against Morocco on 13 January, replacing Moussa Samba in the 77th minute of an eventual 4–0 defeat. Mauritania was eliminated in the group stage.

He was called up yet again for the 2019 Africa Cup of Nations in Egypt, though he did not appear in any games.

On 9 October 2020, Tanjy scored his first senior international goal in a 2–1 friendly win over Sierra Leone. He scored his second international goal on 22 June 2021, netting the second goal in a 2–0 win over Yemen that qualified Mauritania to the FIFA Arab Cup. In November 2021, Tanjy was named to the final squad for the FIFA Arab Cup.

== Career statistics ==
=== Club ===
As of 23 August 2026

Club	Season	League			Cup		Continental		Others		Total	
Club	Season	Division	Apps	Goals	Apps	Goals	Apps	Goals	Apps	Goals	Apps	Goals
Tidjikja	2016-17	Super D1	21	16			-		-		21	16
Tidjikja	2017-18	Super D1	20	15			-				20	15
Tidjikja	Total		41	31							41	31
Nouadhibou	2018-19	Super D1	21	12			2	0			23	12
Nouadhibou	2019-20	Super D1					8	0			8	0
Nouadhibou	2020-21	Super D1	20	24			1	1			21	25
Nouadhibou	2021-22	Super D1	19	10	4	5	4	3			27	18
Nouadhibou	2022-23	Super D1	25	21	3	1			2	2	30	24
Nouadhibou	Total		85	67	7	6	15	4	2	2	109	79
Al-Ittihad	2023-24	Libyan Premier League	6	0			-				6	0
Al Hilal	2023-24	Libyan Premier League	10	3			-				10	3
Al Hilal	2024-25	Libyan Premier League	10	2			2	2			12	4
Olympic Azzaaweya	2025-26	Libyan Premier League	7	1							7	1
Total career			159	113	7	6	17	6	2	2	185	127

=== International ===
As of 23 December 2025

National team	Year	Apps	Goals
Mauritania	2018	5	0
Mauritania	2019	8	0
Mauritania	2020	2	1
Mauritania	2021	11	2
Mauritania	2022	4	1
Mauritania	2023	10	3
Mauritania	2024	8	0
Mauritania	2025	4	1
Total		52	8

=== International goals ===
Scores and results list Mauritania's goal tally first.

No.	Date	Venue	Opponent	Score	Result	Competition
1.	9 October 2020	Stade Cheikha Ould Boïdiya, Nouakchott, Mauritania	Sierra Leone	2–1	2–1	Friendly
2.	6 December 2021	Al Janoub Stadium, Al Wakrah, Qatar	Syria	2–1	2–1	2021 FIFA Arab Cup

== Honours ==
Nouadhibou

- Super D1: 2018–19, 2019–20, 2020–21, 2021–22, 2022–23

Individual

- Super D1 best young player: 2016–17
- Super D1 top scorer (Golden Boot): 2016–17, 2020–21, 2022–23
