= Zakhele Lepasa =

South African soccer player (born 1997)

Personal information
- Full name: Zakhele Lerato Lepasa
- Date of birth: 3 January 1997 (age 29)
- Place of birth: Soweto, South Africa
- Height: 1.79 m (5 ft 10 in)
- Position: Centre forward

Team information
- Current team: Orlando Pirates
- Number: 9

Youth career
- –2018: Orlando Pirates

Senior career*
Years	Team	Apps	(Gls)
2018–	Orlando Pirates	43	(6)
2018–2019	→ Stellenbosch (loan)	4	(0)
2019	→ TS Galaxy (loan)	13	(7)
2023	→ SuperSport United (loan)	9	(3)
2025–	Siwelele	1	(0)

International career^{‡}
2019–	South Africa	7	(3)
- * Club domestic league appearances and goals as of 30 June 2024 ‡ National team caps and goals as of 9 July 2023

Zakhele Lerato Lepasa (born 03 January 1997) is a South African professional soccer player who plays as a centre forward for South African Premier Division side Siwelele F.C. and the South Africa national football team.

== Club career ==
Born in Soweto, Lepasa started his career at Orlando Pirates. In August 2018, Lepasa joined Stellenbosch on a season-long loan. However, after 4 league appearances for Stellenbosch, he switched to TS Galaxy on loan in February 2019. He scored 9 goals in 15 matches for TS Galaxy in all competitions, including scoring the only goal of the 2019 Nedbank Cup Final against Kaizer Chiefs from the penalty spot, making TS Galaxy the first side from outside South Africa's top tier to win the competition. After 4 goals in 4 matches in the Nedbank Cup, he was awarded the 'Player of the Tournament' award as well as being the top scorer in the competition.

Lepasa made his debut for Orlando Pirates on 14 September 2019 as a substitute in a 2–1 win over Chippa United.

== International career ==
Lepasa made his international debut on 2 June 2019 in a 2–2 draw with Botswana in the 2019 COSAFA Cup, with Lepasa scoring in the penalty shoot-out as South Africa lost 5–4. He also scored a goal for Bafana Bafana in a 2–1 win over Morocco in the 2023 Africa Cup of Nations qualification.

== International goals ==
No.	Date	Venue	Opponent	Score	Result	Competition
1.	20 November 2022	Mbombela Stadium, Mbombela, South Africa	Angola	1–1	1–1	Friendly
2.	28 March 2023	Samuel Kanyon Doe Sports Complex, Monrovia, Liberia	Liberia	1–0	2–1	2023 Africa Cup of Nations qualification
3.	17 June 2023	FNB Stadium, Johannesburg, South Africa	Morocco	2–0	2–1	2023 Africa Cup of Nations qualification

== Honours ==
Orlando Pirates

- Carling Black Label Cup: 2019
- MTN 8: 2020, 2022, 2023
- Nedbank Cup: 2019, 2023, 2024
- Caf Confederations Cup: runners-up 2022

South Africa

- Africa Cup of Nations third place: 2023
