= Kevin Muhire =

Rwandan footballer (born 1998)

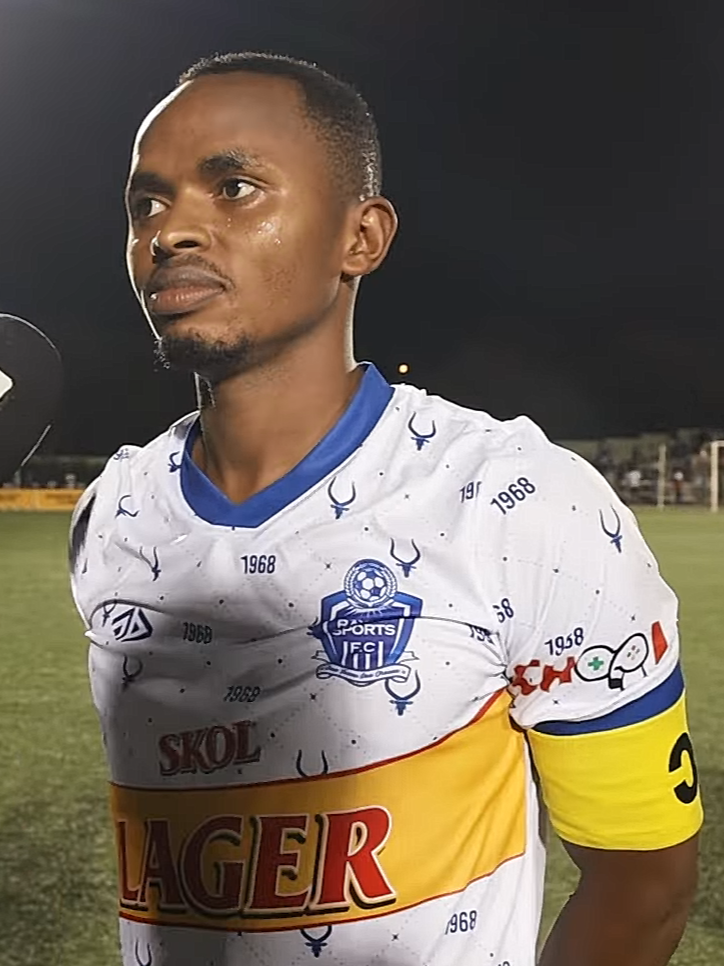
- Muhire in February 2025

Personal information
- Date of birth: 17 October 1998 (age 28)
- Place of birth: Kigali, Rwanda
- Position: Midfielder

Team information
- Current team: Rayon Sports FC

Senior career*
Years	Team	Apps	(Gls)
–2015	Isonga FC		
2015–2018	Rayon Sports FC		
2019–2020	Misr Lel Makkasa SC		
2019	→ El Dakhleya SC (loan)		
2020	→ Tala'ea El Gaish SC (loan)		
2020	Saham Club		
2021–2022	Rayon Sports FC		
2022–2023	Al-Yarmouk SC		
2023–	Rayon Sports FC		

International career
2016–	Rwanda	40	(1)
- * Club domestic league appearances and goals

Kevin Muhire (born 17 October 1998) is a Rwandan footballer who plays as a midfielder for Rayon Sports FC.

== Career ==
Muhire started his career with Rwandan side Isonga FC. He helped the club achieve promotion. In 2015, he signed for Rwandan side Rayon Sports FC. He helped the club win the league. In 2019, he signed for Egyptian side Misr Lel Makkasa SC. After that, he was sent on loan to Egyptian side El Dakhleya SC. In 2020, he was sent on loan to Egyptian side Tala'ea El Gaish SC. After that, he signed for Omani side Saham Club. In 2021, he returned to Rwandan side Rayon Sports FC. In 2022, he signed for Kuwaiti side Al-Yarmouk SC. In 2023, he returned to Rwandan side Rayon Sports FC. He was described as a "considered one of the club's best players" while playing for them. He was awarded the 2023/24 Rayon Sport Player of the Season. He captained the club.

Muhire is a Rwanda international. He was previously a Rwanda youth international. He played for the Rwanda national under-17 football team, Rwanda national under-20 football team and Rwanda national under-23 football team. He played for the Rwanda national football team at the 2015 CECAFA Cup.

== Personal life ==
Muhire was born on 17 October 1998 in Kigali, Rwanda. He attended Groupe Scolaire Mburabuturo in Rwanda. After that, he attended APE Rugunga in Rwanda. He studied history, economics, and geography. He is the son of Evariste Nsengiyumva and Gasigwa Murorunkwere. He has regarded Spain international Xavi as his football idol. He has been a supporter of English Premier League side Manchester United FC.
