= Eba Viegas =

Santomean footballer (born 1999)

Personal information
- Full name: Ebanilson Domingos de Lima Viegas
- Date of birth: 7 October 1999 (age 27)
- Place of birth: Estoril, Portugal
- Height: 1.75 m (5 ft 9 in)
- Position: Forward

Youth career
- 2013–2015: Estoril
- 2015–2017: Oeiras
- 2017–2018: Belenenses

Senior career*
| Years | Team | Apps | (Gls) |
| 2018–2019 | Tires | 22 | (7) |
| 2019–2020 | Olímpico Montijo | 5 | (0) |
| 2020 | Tires | 5 | (0) |
| 2020–2021 | Alverca II | 8 | (1) |
| 2021–2022 | Moncarapachense | 25 | (5) |
| 2022–2024 | Amora | 28 | (1) |
| 2022–2023 | → Moncarapachense (loan) | 22 | (4) |
| 2024 | Caldas | 13 | (0) |

International career^{‡}
| 2021– | São Tomé and Príncipe | 1 | (0) |
- * Club domestic league appearances and goals as of 1 January 2025 ‡ National team caps and goals as of 18:40, 23 October 2023 (UTC)

Ebanilson "Eba" Domingos de Lima Viegas (born 7 October 1999) is a footballer who plays as a forward. Born in Portugal, he represents São Tomé and Príncipe at international level.

== International career ==
Viegas made his professional debut with the São Tomé and Príncipe national team in a 2–0 2021 Africa Cup of Nations qualification loss to Sudan on 24 March 2021.
