= Olivier Niyonzima =

Rwandan footballer

Personal information
- Full name: Olivier Sefu Niyonzima
- Date of birth: 1 January 1993 (age 33)
- Place of birth: Kigali, Rwanda
- Height: 1.78 m (5 ft 10 in)
- Position: Defensive midfielder

Team information
- Current team: AS Kigali

Senior career*
Years	Team	Apps	(Gls)
2014–2015	Isonga		
2015–2019	Rayon Sports		
2019– 2021	APR		
2021 - 2023	AS Kigali		

International career^{‡}
2017–	Rwanda	21	(1)
- * Club domestic league appearances and goals ‡ National team caps and goals as of 7 October 2021

Olivier Niyonzima (born 1 January 1993) is a Rwandan football midfielder who currently plays for AS Kigali. He was a squad member for the 2017 CECAFA Cup and the 2020 African Nations Championship.

== International career ==
=== International goals ===
Scores and results list Rwanda's goal tally first.

No.	Date	Venue	Opponent	Score	Result	Competition
1.	16 January 2021	Limbe Stadium, Limbe, Cameroon	Togo	1–1	3–2	2020 African Nations Championship
