= Thierry Manzi =

Rwandan footballer

Personal information
- Date of birth: 12 July 1996 (age 30)
- Place of birth: Kigali, Rwanda
- Height: 1.86 m (6 ft 1 in)
- Position: Defender

Team information
- Current team: Al Ahli Tripoli
- Number: 17

Senior career*
Years	Team	Apps	(Gls)
2013–2014	Isonga		
2014–2015	Marines		
2015–2019	Rayon Sports		
2019–2021	APR		
2021–2022	Dila Gori	9	(0)
2022–2023	AS FAR	5	(1)
2023	AS Kigali		
2023–	Al Ahli Tripoli		

International career^{‡}
2016–	Rwanda	39	(4)
- * Club domestic league appearances and goals as of 26 June 2022 ‡ National team caps and goals as of 29 March 2023

Thierry Manzi (born 12 July 1996) is a Rwandan professional footballer who plays as a defender for Libyan club Al Ahli Tripoli and the Rwanda national team.
