= Mamadou Camara (footballer, born 2003) =

Senegalese footballer (born 2003)

Personal information
- Full name: Mamadou Lamine Camara
- Date of birth: 5 January 2003 (age 23)
- Place of birth: Tivaouane, Senegal
- Height: 1.93 m (6 ft 4 in)
- Position: Midfielder

Team information
- Current team: Al Ahli Tripoli
- Number: 6

Youth career
- Darou Salam

Senior career*
Years	Team	Apps	(Gls)
2021–2026	Berkane	75	(3)
2026–	Al Ahli Tripoli	0	(0)

International career^{‡}
2019–	Senegal U17	5	(0)
2020–	Senegal U20	11	(2)
2022–	Senegal U23	3	(1)
2023–	Senegal	3	(1)
Medal record
Men's football
Representing Senegal
Africa Cup of Nations
Runner-up	2025 Morocco
- * Club domestic league appearances and goals as of 9 April 2025 (UTC) ‡ National team caps and goals as of 18 November 2025 (UTC)

Mamadou Lamine Camara (born 5 January 2003) is a Senegalese professional footballer who plays as a midfielder for Al Ahli Tripoli and the Senegal national team.

== Club career ==
Born in Dakar, Camara began his career at the Académie Foot Darou Salam. In 2021, he moved to Morocco to sign for RS Berkane.

== International career ==
Camara was first called up to the Senegalese under-20 side in 2019, going on to be named best player at the Tournoi UFOA A U20, which served as qualification for the 2021 Africa U-20 Cup of Nations.

He was called up again to the Senegalese under-20 side for the 2023 Africa U-20 Cup of Nations.

He was called up to the senior squad for 2025 Africa Cup of Nations in Morocco.

== Career statistics ==
=== Club ===
As of 24 February 2023

Appearances and goals by club, season and competition
Club	Season	League			Cup		Continental		Other		Total	
Club	Season	Division	Apps	Goals	Apps	Goals	Apps	Goals	Apps	Goals	Apps	Goals
Berkane	2021–22	Botola	17	0	0	0	6 (Note: Appearances in the CAF Confederation Cup)	0	0	0	23	0
Berkane	2022–23	Botola	10	0	0	0	3	0	1 (Note: Appearances in the CAF Super Cup)	0	14	0
Career total			27	0	0	0	9	0	1	0	37	0

=== International goals ===
Scores and results list Senegal's goal tally first.

No.	Date	Venue	Opponent	Score	Result	Competition
1.	9 September 2023	Huye Stadium, Butare, Rwanda	Rwanda	1–0	1–1	2023 Africa Cup of Nations qualification

== Honours ==
RS Berkane

- Botola Pro: 2024–25
- Moroccan Throne Cup: 2020–21, 2021–22
- CAF Confederation Cup: 2021–22, 2024–25
- CAF Super Cup: 2022

Senegal U20

- U-20 Africa Cup of Nations: 2023

Individual

- Botola Pro Best Foreign Player of the Season: 2024–25
