= Mohammed Sangare =

Liberian footballer

Personal information
- Full name: Mohammed Sangare
- Date of birth: 28 December 1998 (age 27)
- Place of birth: Monrovia, Liberia
- Height: 1.91 m (6 ft 3 in)
- Position: Midfielder

Team information
- Current team: Sahel

Youth career
- Accrington Stanley
- 2016–2019: Newcastle United

Senior career*
Years	Team	Apps	(Gls)
2019–2022	Newcastle United	0	(0)
2020–2021	→ Accrington Stanley (loan)	2	(0)
2022–2023	Accrington Stanley	22	(0)
2023–2024	Livingston	25	(1)
2024–2025	Bellinzona	24	(2)
2025–2026	Morecambe	30	(1)
2026–	Sahel	0	(0)

International career^{‡}
2019–	Liberia	26	(4)
- * Club domestic league appearances and goals as of 20:31, 2 June 2026 (UTC) ‡ National team caps and goals as of 19:33, 29 September 2026 (UTC)

Mohammed Sangare (born 28 December 1998) is a Liberian footballer who plays for Tunisian Ligue Professionnelle 1 club Sahel.

== Early and personal life ==
Sangare was born in Monrovia, Liberia, and moved to England at the age of 14. His younger brother, Faisu, was part of the Wolverhampton Wanderers under-23 setup.

== Club career ==
Sangare has played club football in England for Accrington Stanley and Newcastle United. He was promoted to Newcastle's first-team in July 2019.

He returned to Accrington Stanley on loan in August 2020.

In May 2022, it was announced that Sangare would be released at the end of his contract. Later that month it was announced that he would return to Accrington Stanley when his Newcastle contract expires on 1 July.

In June 2023, it was announced Sangare would join Livingston. He left the club in July 2024.

Following his departure from Livingston, Sangare signed for Swiss club Bellinzona on a one-year contract.

On 20 August 2025, Sangare returned to England, joining National League club Morecambe as the club's first signing following their takeover. On 16 May 2026, Morecambe announced he was being released.

== International career ==
Sangare received his first call-up to the Liberia national team in August 2018, for upcoming 2019 Africa Cup of Nations qualification matches. He had to withdraw from the squad twice as he was awaiting his UK residence permit to be re-issued, meaning he was unable to travel. He was recalled by the Liberian senior national team in March 2019.

He made his debut for the Liberia national football team on 24 March 2019 in an Africa Cup of Nations qualifier against DR Congo, coming on as a 73rd-minute substitute for Allen Njie.

== Career statistics ==
=== International ===
As of match played 29 September 2026

Appearances and goals by national team and year
National team	Year	Apps	Goals
Liberia	2019	5	1
Liberia	2022	3	0
Liberia	2023	7	1
Liberia	2024	8	2
Liberia	2025	3	0
Total		26	4

=== International goals ===
Scores and results list Liberia's goal tally first.

No.	Date	Venue	Opponent	Score	Result	Competition
1.	4 September 2019	Samuel Kanyon Doe Sports Complex, Paynesville, Liberia	Sierra Leone	2–1	3–1	2022 FIFA World Cup qualification
2.	24 March 2023	Orlando Stadium, Johannesburg, South Africa	South Africa	2–2	2–2	2023 Africa Cup of Nations qualification
3.	20 March 2024	Marrakesh Stadium, Marrakesh, Morocco	Djibouti	1–0	2–0	2025 Africa Cup of Nations qualification
4.	13 November 2024	Samuel Kanyon Doe Sports Complex, Paynesville, Liberia	Togo	1–0	1–0	2025 Africa Cup of Nations qualification
