= Niger national football team results (2020–present) =

This article provides details of international football games played by the Niger national football team from 2020 to present.

== Results ==
Key
Win
Draw
Defeat

=== 2020 ===
10 October 2020 Friendly	Niger	2–0	Chad	Niamey, Niger
	Adebayor 54'; Djibrilla 62'	Report		Stadium: Stade Général Seyni Kountché; Attendance: 0 Referee: Komlanvi Aklassou (Togo)

10 October 2020 Friendly	Niger	1–0	Sierra Leone	Niamey, Niger
	Djibrilla 54'	Report		Stadium: Stade Général Seyni Kountché; Attendance: 0 Referee: Clement Franklin Kpan (Ivory Coast)

13 November 2020 2021 AFCONQ	Niger	1–0	Ethiopia	Niamey, Niger
17:00 UTC+1	Oumarou 73'	Report		Stadium: Stade Général Seyni Kountché; Referee: Hassen Corneh (Liberia)

17 November 2020 2021 AFCONQ	Ethiopia	3–0	Niger	Bahir Dar, Ethiopia
16:00 UTC+3	Gebremichael 13'; Mohammed 43'; Kebede 70'	Report		Stadium: Bahir Dar Stadium; Referee: Daudu Williams (Sierra Leone)

=== 2021 ===
17 January 2021 2020 CHAN	Libya	0–0	Niger	Douala, Cameroon
17:00 UTC+1		Report		Stadium: Japoma Stadium; Referee: Daniel Nii Laryea (Ghana)

21 January 2021 2020 CHAN	Congo	1–1	Niger	Douala, Cameroon
20:00 UTC+1	Mouandza 35'	Report	Moussa 70' (pen.)	Stadium: Japoma Stadium; Referee: Peter Waweru (Kenya)

25 January 2021 2020 CHAN	Niger	1–2	DR Congo	Yaoundé, Cameroon
20:00 UTC+1	Moussa 73'	Report	Kabangu 27'; Obenza 90+1'	Stadium: Stade Ahmadou Ahidjo; Referee: Lahlou Benbraham (Algeria)

26 March 2021 2021 AFCONQ	Niger	0–3	Ivory Coast	Lomé, Togo
16:00 UTC+0		Report	Aurier 25'; Gradel 34'; Kanon 60'	Stadium: Stade de Kégué; Referee: Beida Dahane (Mauritania)

30 March 2021 2021 AFCONQ	Madagascar	0–0	Niger	Toamasina, Madagascar
16:00 UTC+3		Report		Stadium: Barikadimy Stadium; Referee: Eric Otogo-Castane (Gabon)

5 June 2021 Friendly	Gambia	2–0	Niger	Manavgat, Turkey
18:00 UTC+3	Jallow 28'; Badamosi 90+1'	Report		Stadium: Arslan Zeki Demirci Sports Complex; Referee: Abdulkadir Bitigen (Turkey)

7 June 2021 Friendly	Togo	Cancelled	Niger	Turkey
		Report

9 June 2021 Friendly	Niger	0–1	Congo	Manavgat, Turkey
19:00 UTC+3		Report	Mbenza 32'	Stadium: Arslan Zeki Demirci Sports Complex

11 June 2021 Friendly	Guinea	2–1	Niger	Manavgat, Turkey
17:00 UTC+3	Camara 56'; Conté 72' (pen.)	Report	Adebayor 29'	Stadium: Arslan Zeki Demirci Sports Complex; Attendance: 0

2 September 2021 2022 World Cup qualification	Niger	0–2	Burkina Faso	Marrakesh, Morocco
17:00 UTC+1		Report	L. Traoré 76' (pen.); Konaté 79'	Stadium: Stade de Marrakech; Referee: Samuel Uwikunda (Rwanda)

6 September 2021 2022 World Cup qualification	Djibouti	2–4	Niger	Rabat, Morocco
14:00 UTC+1	Farah Ali 32'; Hassan 90'	Report	Adebayor 49', 56'; Wonkoye 65' (pen.); Sabo 68'	Stadium: Prince Moulay Abdellah Stadium; Referee: Celso Alvação (Mozambique)

8 October 2021 2022 World Cup qualification	Algeria	6–1	Niger	Blida, Algeria
20:00 UTC+1	Mahrez 27', 60' (pen.); Oumarou 47' (o.g.); Souleymane 70' (o.g.); Slimani 76', 88'	Report	Sosah 50'	Stadium: Mustapha Tchaker Stadium; Referee: Daniel Nii Laryea (Ghana)

12 October 2021 2022 World Cup qualification	Niger	0–4	Algeria	Niamey, Niger
17:00 UTC+1		Report	Mahrez 21'; Mandi 33'; Bennacer 48'; Bounedjah 54'	Stadium: Stade Général Seyni Kountché; Attendance: 2,000; Referee: Issa Sy (Senegal)

12 November 2021 2022 World Cup qualification	Burkina Faso	1–1	Niger	Marrakesh, Morocco
13:00 UTC+1	Dayo 55' (pen.)	Report	Oumarou 34' (pen.)	Stadium: Stade de Marrakech; Referee: Samir Guezzaz (Morocco)

15 November 2021 2022 World Cup qualification	Niger	7–2	Djibouti	Niamey, Niger
17:00 UTC+1	Adebayor 14', 36', 75'; Wonkoye 62'; Sosah 64'; Djibrilla 86', 87'	Report	Ahmed 33'; Isman 84'	Stadium: Stade Général Seyni Kountché; Referee: Mohamed Youssouf Athoumani (Comoros)

=== 2022 ===
23 March 2022 Friendly	Niger	1–1	Mozambique	Nouakchott, Mauritania
20:00	Adebayor 64'	Report	Gildo 84'	Stadium: Stade Cheikha Ould Boïdiya; Referee: Babacar Sarr (Mauritania)

26 March 2022 Friendly	Libya	2–1	Niger	Nouakchott, Mauritania
17:00	Soulah 21'; Ellafi 88' (pen.)	Report	Adebayor 90+2' (pen.)	Stadium: Stade Cheikha Ould Boïdiya; Referee: Abdel Aziz Mohamed Bouh (Mauritania)

4 June 2022 2023 AFCON Q	Niger	1–1	Tanzania	Cotonou, Benin
17:00 UTC+1	Sosah 26'	Report	Mpole 1'	Stadium: Stade de l'Amitié; Referee: Komlanvi Aklassou (Togo)

8 June 2022 2023 AFCON Q	Uganda	1–1	Niger	Entebbe, Uganda
16:00 UTC+3	Karisa 43'	Report	Sabo 74'	Stadium: St. Mary's Stadium-Kitende; Referee: Tsegay Mogos Teklu (Eritrea)

28 August 2022 2022 African Nations Championship Q	Togo	1–0	Niger	Lomé, Togo
	Agoro 56'			Stadium: Stade de Kégué

3 September 2022 2022 African Nations Championship Q	Niger	3–1	Togo	Cotonou, Benin
	Haïnikoye 45+3'; Garba 77'; Mossi 90+4' (pen.)		Akoro 49'	Stadium: Stade de l'Amitié

23 September 2022 Friendly	Egypt	3–0	Niger	Alexandria, Egypt
20:00 UTC+2	Salah 43', 55', 67' (pen.)	Report		Stadium: Alexandria Stadium; Referee: Sadek Selmi (Tunisia)

25 September 2022 Friendly	Niger	0–0	Liberia	Alexandria, Egypt
17:00 UTC+2		Report		Stadium: Alexandria Stadium; Referee: Ahmed Gamal (Egypt)

17 November 2022 Friendly	Niger	2–3	Libya	Antalya, Turkey
15:00 UTC+3		Report		Stadium: Zeytinköy 1 Nolu Saha

20 November 2022 Friendly	Gabon	3–1	Niger	Antalya, Turkey
19:00 UTC+3	Allevinah 26', 34'; Do Marcolino 80'	Report	Adebayor 47' (pen.)	Stadium: Atilla Vehbi Konuk Tesisleri; Referee: Zorbay Küçük (Turkey)

21 December 2022 Friendly	Ajaccio	2–0	Niger	Ajaccio, France
15:00 UTC+1	Laçi 85'; Nouri 90' (pen.)			Stadium: Stade François Coty

=== 2023 ===
6 January 2023 Friendly	Senegal	0–0	Niger	Tabarka, Tunisia
13:00 CET (UTC+1)		Report		Stadium: La Cigale Sport Complex

23 March 2023 2023 AFCON qualification	Algeria	2–1	Niger	Algiers, Algeria
22:00 UTC+1	Alhassane 54' (o.g.); Mahrez 88'	Report	Sosah 38'	Stadium: Nelson Mandela Stadium; Referee: Mahmood Ismail (Sudan)

27 March 2023 2023 AFCON qualification	Niger	0–1	Algeria	Tunis, Tunisia
17:00 UTC+1		Report	Bounedjah 6'	Stadium: Hammadi Agrebi Stadium; Referee: Boubou Traoré (Mali)

18 June 2023 2023 AFCON qualification	Tanzania	1–0	Niger	Dar es Salaam, Tanzania
16:00 UTC+3	Msuva 69'	Report		Stadium: National Stadium; Referee: Mohamed Al Sayd (Egypt)

7 September 2023 2023 AFCON qualification	Niger	0–2	Uganda	Marrakesh, Morocco
20:00 UTC+1		Report	Kayondo 17'; Ochaya 39'	Stadium: Stade de Marrakech; Referee: Jean Jacques Ndala Ngambo (DR Congo)

14 October 2023 Friendly	Niger	3–0	Somalia	Berrechid, Morocco
	Amoustapha 9'; A. Wonkoye 26' (pen.); Goumey 74'			Stadium: Berrechid Municipal Stadium

17 October 2023 Friendly	Libya	1–1	Niger	Khouribga, Morocco
16:30 UTC+1	El Ghadi 59'	Report	Sabo 75'	Stadium: Phosphate Stadium; Referee: Mustapha Kechaf (Morocco)

18 November 2023 2026 FIFA World Cup qualification	Niger	0–1	Tanzania	Marrakesh, Morocco
17:00 UTC+1		Report		Stadium: Marrakech Stadium

21 November 2023 2026 FIFA World Cup qualification	Niger	2–1	Zambia	Marrakesh, Morocco
20:00 UTC+1		Report		Stadium: Marrakech Stadium

=== 2024 ===
8 January Friendly	Senegal	1–0	Niger	Diamniadio, Senegal
18:00 UTC+0	F. Mendy 90+9'	Report		Stadium: Diamniadio Olympic Stadium

22 March Friendly	Niger	1–2	Togo	Mohammedia, Morocco
22:00 UTC+0	Sosah 55'	Report	Dermane 60', 65'	Stadium: El Bachir Stadium

26 March Friendly	Niger	1–1	Burkina Faso	Berrechid, Morocco
22:00 UTC+0	Sosah 53'	Report	Djiga 30'	Stadium: Berrechid Municipal Stadium

June 2026 FIFA World Cup qualification	Congo	0–3; Awarded (Note: Niger were awarded a 3–0 victory by forfeit after Congo refused to travel to DR Congo for their home match on 6 June, insisting that they play in Brazzaville. (Note: Congo refused to travel for their home matches on 6 and 11 June, insisting that they be played in Brazzaville.))	Niger

June 2026 FIFA World Cup qualification	Eritrea	Cancelled	Niger
Note: Eritrea withdrew from the qualifiers before the first matches were played.

4 September 2025 Africa Cup of Nations qualification	Sudan	1–0	Niger	Juba, South Sudan
15:00 UTC+2	Eisa 51'	Report		Stadium: Juba Stadium; Referee: Jean Pierre Nguiene (Congo)

9 September 2025 Africa Cup of Nations qualification	Niger	1–1	Ghana	Berkane, Morocco
16:00 UTC+1	Sako 81'	Report	Seidu 44'	Stadium: Berkane Municipal Stadium; Referee: Lamin Jammeh (Gambia)

11 October 2025 Africa Cup of Nations qualification	Angola	2–0	Niger	Talatona, Angola
20:00 UTC+1	Mabululu 75' (pen.); Felicio Milson 85'	Report		Stadium: Estádio 11 de Novembro; Referee: Pierre Atcho (Gabon)

15 October 2025 Africa Cup of Nations qualification	Niger	0–1	Angola	Casablanca, Morocco
17:00 UTC+1		Report	Zini 1'	Stadium: Larbi Zaouli Stadium; Referee: Adalbert Diouf (Senegal)

14 November 2025 Africa Cup of Nations qualification	Niger	4–0	Sudan	Lomé, Togo
16:00 UTC+1	Sosah 6', 45+3' (pen.); Oumarou 29'; Badamassi 51'	Report		Stadium: Stade de Kégué; Referee: Ahmad Heeralall (Mauritius)

18 November 2025 Africa Cup of Nations qualification	Ghana	1–2	Niger	Accra, Ghana
13:00 UTC+0	Afriyie 67'	Report	Badamassi 22'; Sako 90+2'	Stadium: Accra Sports Stadium; Referee: Rulisa Patience Fidele (Central African Republic)

=== 2025 ===
21 March 2026 World Cup qualification	Niger	1–2	Morocco	Oujda, Morocco
21:30 UTC+0	Oumarou 47'	Report	Saibari 59'; El Khannouss 90+1'	Stadium: Honor Stadium; Attendance: 20,000; Referee: Omar Artan (Somalia)

25 March Friendly	Niger	6–0	Bonaire	Casablanca, Morocco
				Stadium: Père Jégo Stadium

20 May Friendly	Oman	4–1	Niger	Muscat, Oman
20:00 UTC+4	Al-Sadi 25' (pen.); Al-Ghafri 45', 45+1'; Al-Ghassani 86' (pen.)	Report	Goumey 39'	Stadium: Sultan Qaboos Sports Complex; Attendance: 0

5 September 2026 World Cup qualification	Morocco	5–0	Niger	Rabat, Morocco
20:00 UTC+1	Saibari 29', 38'; El Kaabi 51'; Igamane 69'; Ounahi 84'	Report		Stadium: Prince Moulay Abdellah Stadium; Attendance: 63,000; Referee: Jean-Jacques Ndala Ngambo (DR Congo)

9 September 2026 World Cup qualification	Tanzania	0–1	Niger	Zanzibar City, Tanzania
16:00 UTC+3		Report	Sosah 58'	Stadium: Amaan Stadium; Referee: Mustapha Ghorbal (Algeria)

8 October 2026 World Cup qualification	Niger	3–1	Congo	Ouagadougou, Burkina Faso
19:00 UTC+0	Sosah 45+2'; Oumarou 49'; Adebayor 67'	Report	Bassinga 90+4'	Stadium: Stade du 4 Août; Referee: Boubou Traoré (Mali)

12 October 2026 World Cup qualification	Zambia	0–1	Niger	Ndola, Zambia
15:00 UTC+2		Report	Sosah 56'	Stadium: Levy Mwanawasa Stadium; Attendance: 49,800; Referee: Lucky Kasalirwe (Uganda)

14 November Friendly	Burkina Faso	3–2	Niger	Mohammedia, Morocco
		Report		Stadium: El Bechir Stadium

18 November Friendly	Guinea	1–1	Niger	Berrechid, Morocco
16:30 UTC+1	Baldé 59'	Report	Sako 84'	Attendance: Berrechid Municipal Stadium

=== 2026 ===
27 March Friendly	Libya	0–0	Niger	Casablanca, Morocco
19:00 UTC+1		Report		Stadium: Larbi Zaouli Stadium; Referee: Mustapha Kech Chaf (Morocco)

31 March Friendly	Niger	0–1	Togo	Casablanca, Morocco
17:00 UTC+1		Report	Denkey 5'	Stadium: Père Jégo Stadium; Referee: Mohamed El Baroudi (Morocco)

5 June Friendly	Benin	1–1	Niger	Casablanca, Morocco
20:00 UTC+1	Amadou 37'	Report	Sako 90+2'	Stadium: Père Jégo Stadium; Referee: Naoufal Nachite (Morocco)

8 June Friendly	Mauritania	1–0	Niger	Casablanca, Morocco
20:00 UTC+1	I. Thiam 90+6'	Report		Stadium: Père Jégo Stadium; Referee: Mustapha Kechchaf (Morocco)
