= 2022 FIFA World Cup qualification – CAF second round =

The second round of CAF matches for 2022 FIFA World Cup qualification was played over six matchdays, from 1 September to 16 November 2021.

== Format ==
The second round saw the top 26 ranked CAF teams joined by the 14 winners from the first round. These teams were drawn into ten groups of four teams to play home-and-away round-robin matches. The winners of each group advanced to the third round.

== Seeding ==
The draw for the second round was held on 21 January 2020, 19:00 CAT (UTC+2), at the Nile Ritz-Carlton in Cairo, Egypt.

The seeding was based on the FIFA World Rankings of December 2019 (shown in parentheses below).

Note: Bolded teams qualified for the third round.

Pot 1	Pot 2	Pot 3	Pot 4
1. **Senegal** (20); 2. **Tunisia** (27); 3. **Nigeria** (31); 4. **Algeria** (35); 5. **Morocco** (43); 6. **Ghana** (47); 7. **Egypt** (51); 8. **Cameroon** (53); 9. **Mali** (56); 10. **DR Congo** (56)	11. Burkina Faso (59); 12. Ivory Coast (61); 13. South Africa (71); 14. Guinea (74); 15. Uganda (77); 16. Cape Verde (78); 17. Gabon (83); 18. Benin (84); 19. Zambia (88); 20. Congo (89)	21. Madagascar (91); 22. Mauritania (100); 23. Libya (101); 24. Mozambique (105)^{†}; 25. Kenya (106); 26. Central African Republic (109); 27. Zimbabwe (111)^{†}; 28. Niger (112); 29. Namibia (117)^{†}; 30. Guinea-Bissau (118)^{†}	31. Malawi (123)^{†}; 32. Angola (124)^{†}; 33. Togo (126)^{†}; 34. Sudan (128)^{†}; 35. Rwanda (131)^{†}; 36. Tanzania (134)^{†}; 37. Equatorial Guinea (145)^{†}; 38. Ethiopia (146)^{†}; 39. Liberia (152)^{†}; 40. Djibouti (184)^{†}

^{†} First round winners

== Schedule ==
Below is the schedule of the second round of CAF 2022 FIFA World Cup qualification. After the rescheduling of the 2021 Africa Cup of Nations final tournament from June/July to January/February, the dates of Matchdays 1 and 2 of the second round were rescheduled. Because the competition was interrupted by the COVID-19 pandemic, the schedule of the second round was revised again and on 19 August 2020 CAF announced the new dates, and the entire second round was postponed to 2021. On 6 May 2021, the second round was once again postponed due to the pandemic, and all matches were rescheduled to be played between September and November 2021.

Matchday	Dates	Matches
Matchday 1	1–3 September 2021 (Note: Matchday 1 originally scheduled for 23–31 March 2020, later for 5–13 October 2020, then 5–8 June 2021.)	1 v 4, 3 v 2
Matchday 2	5–7 September 2021 (Note: Matchday 2 originally scheduled for 1–9 June 2020, later for 9–17 November 2020, then 11–14 June 2021.)	2 v 1, 4 v 3
Matchday 3	6–9 October 2021 (Note: Matchday 3 originally scheduled for 22–26 March 2021, later for 1–4 June 2021, then 1–4 September 2021.)	1 v 3, 4 v 2
Matchday 4	10–12 October 2021 (Note: Matchday 4 originally scheduled for 27–30 March 2021, later for 5–8 June 2021, then 5–8 September 2021.)	3 v 1, 2 v 4
Matchday 5	11–13 November 2021 (Note: Matchday 5 originally scheduled for 30 August – 7 September 2021, then 6–9 October 2021.)	4 v 1, 2 v 3
Matchday 6	14–16 November 2021 (Note: Matchday 6 originally scheduled for 4–12 October 2021, then 10–12 October 2021.)	1 v 2, 3 v 4

== Groups ==
=== Group A ===
Pos	Team	Pld	W	D	L	GF	GA	GD	Pts	Qualification	Algeria	Burkina Faso	Niger	Djibouti
1	Algeria	6	4	2	0	25	4	+21	14	Advance to third round	—	2–2	6–1	8–0
2	Burkina Faso	6	3	3	0	12	4	+8	12		1–1	—	1–1	2–0
3	Niger	6	2	1	3	13	17	−4	7		0–4	0–2	—	7–2
4	Djibouti	6	0	0	6	4	29	−25	0		0–4	0–4	2–4	—

Source: FIFA, Soccerway
Rules for classification: Tiebreakers
2 September 2021
17:00 UTC+1

Niger	0–2	Burkina Faso
	Report	L. Traoré 76' (pen.); Konaté 79'

Marrakesh Stadium, Marrakesh (Morocco)
Attendance: 0
Referee: Samuel Uwikunda (Rwanda)
2 September 2021
20:00 UTC+1

Algeria	8–0	Djibouti
Slimani 5', 25' (pen.), 46', 53'; Bensebaini 27'; Bounedjah 40' (pen.); Mahrez 67'; Zerrouki 69'	Report

Mustapha Tchaker Stadium, Blida
Attendance: 0
Referee: Blaise Yuven Ngwa (Cameroon)

6 September 2021
14:00 UTC+1

Djibouti	2–4	Niger
Farah Ali 32'; Hassan 90'	Report	Adebayor 49', 56'; Wonkoye 65' (pen.); Sabo 68'

Prince Moulay Abdellah Stadium, Rabat (Morocco)
Attendance: 0
Referee: Celso Alvação (Mozambique)
7 September 2021
20:00 UTC+1

Burkina Faso	1–1	Algeria
Tapsoba 64'	Report	Feghouli 18'

Marrakesh Stadium, Marrakesh (Morocco)
Attendance: 0
Referee: Joshua Bondo (Botswana)

8 October 2021
20:00 UTC+1

Algeria	6–1	Niger
Mahrez 27', 60' (pen.); Oumarou 47' (o.g.); Souleymane 70' (o.g.); Slimani 76', 88'	Report	Sosah 50'

Mustapha Tchaker Stadium, Blida
Attendance: 0
Referee: Daniel Nii Laryea (Ghana)
8 October 2021
20:00 UTC+1

Djibouti	0–4	Burkina Faso
	Report	Tapsoba 45+2', 48'; Kaboré 51'; Konaté 60'

Marrakesh Stadium, Marrakesh (Morocco)
Attendance: 0
Referee: Ali Sabilla (Uganda)

11 October 2021
17:00 UTC+1

Burkina Faso	2–0	Djibouti
Dayo 30'; Tapsoba 63'	Report

Marrakesh Stadium, Marrakesh (Morocco)
Attendance: 0
Referee: Hassen Corneh (Liberia)
12 October 2021
17:00 UTC+1

Niger	0–4	Algeria
	Report	Mahrez 21'; Mandi 33'; Bennacer 48'; Bounedjah 54'

Stade Général Seyni Kountché, Niamey
Attendance: 2,000
Referee: Issa Sy (Senegal)

12 November 2021
14:00 UTC+1

Burkina Faso	1–1	Niger
Dayo 55' (pen.)	Report	Oumarou 34' (pen.)

Marrakesh Stadium, Marrakesh (Morocco)
Attendance: 0
Referee: Samir Guezzaz (Morocco)
12 November 2021
15:00 UTC+2

Djibouti	0–4	Algeria
	Report	Belaïli 29'; Benrahma 40'; Feghouli 42'; Slimani 87'

Cairo International Stadium, Cairo (Egypt)
Attendance: 0
Referee: Djindo Louis Houngnandande (Benin)

15 November 2021
17:00 UTC+1

Niger	7–2	Djibouti
Adebayor 14', 36', 75'; Wonkoye 62'; Sosah 64'; Djibrilla 85', 87'	Report	Ahmed 33'; Siad Isman 84'

Stade Général Seyni Kountché, Niamey
Attendance: 3,000
Referee: Mohamed Youssouf Athoumani (Comoros)
16 November 2021
20:00 UTC+1

Algeria	2–2	Burkina Faso
Mahrez 21'; Feghouli 68'	Report	Sanogo 37'; Dayo 84' (pen.)

Mustapha Tchaker Stadium, Blida
Attendance: 17,000
Referee: Victor Gomes (South Africa)

=== Group B ===
Pos	Team	Pld	W	D	L	GF	GA	GD	Pts	Qualification	Tunisia	Equatorial Guinea	Zambia	Mauritania
1	Tunisia	6	4	1	1	11	2	+9	13	Advance to third round	—	3–0	3–1	3–0
2	Equatorial Guinea	6	3	2	1	6	5	+1	11		1–0	—	2–0	1–0
3	Zambia	6	2	1	3	8	9	−1	7		0–2	1–1	—	4–0
4	Mauritania	6	0	2	4	2	11	−9	2		0–0	1–1	1–2	—

Source: FIFA, Soccerway
Rules for classification: Tiebreakers
3 September 2021
16:00 UTC+0

Mauritania	1–2	Zambia
Niass 69'	Report	Mwepu 10'; Mumba 57'

Stade Olympique de Nouakchott, Nouakchott
Attendance: 0
Referee: Ibrahim Nour El Din (Egypt)
3 September 2021
20:00 UTC+1

Tunisia	3–0	Equatorial Guinea
Bronn 54'; Skhiri 78'; Khazri 82' (pen.)	Report

Stade Hammadi Agrebi, Tunis
Attendance: 0
Referee: Daniel Nii Laryea (Ghana)

7 September 2021
15:00 UTC+2

Zambia	0–2	Tunisia
	Report	Khazri 8' (pen.); Ben Slimane 90+2'

Levy Mwanawasa Stadium, Ndola
Attendance: 5,000
Referee: Eric Otogo-Castane (Gabon)
7 September 2021
17:00 UTC+1

Equatorial Guinea	1–0	Mauritania
Iban 59' (pen.)	Report

Estadio de Malabo, Malabo
Attendance: 0
Referee: Hélder Martins de Carvalho (Angola)

7 October 2021
17:00 UTC+1

Equatorial Guinea	2–0	Zambia
Coco 35'; Nsue 88'	Report

Estadio de Malabo, Malabo
Attendance: 0
Referee: Noureddine El Jaafari (Morocco)
7 October 2021
20:00 UTC+1

Tunisia	3–0	Mauritania
Skhiri 15'; Khazri 42'; Jaziri 86'	Report

Stade Hammadi Agrebi, Tunis
Attendance: 0
Referee: Bamlak Tessema Weyesa (Ethiopia)

10 October 2021
18:00 UTC+2

Zambia	1–1	Equatorial Guinea
F. Sakala 65'	Report	Bikoro 82'

National Heroes Stadium, Lusaka
Attendance: 45,000
Referee: Bakary Gassama (Gambia)
10 October 2021
19:00 UTC+0

Mauritania	0–0	Tunisia
	Report

Stade Olympique de Nouakchott, Nouakchott
Attendance: 500
Referee: Mehdi Abid Charef (Algeria)

13 November 2021
15:00 UTC+2

Zambia	4–0	Mauritania
Daka 34'; F. Sakala 37', 45+1' (pen.), 63'	Report

National Heroes Stadium, Lusaka
Attendance: 5,000
Referee: Mahmood Ali Mahmood Ismail (Sudan)
13 November 2021
17:00 UTC+1

Equatorial Guinea	1–0	Tunisia
Ganet 84'	Report

Estadio de Malabo, Malabo
Attendance: 500
Referee: Boubou Traoré (Mali)

16 November 2021
20:00 UTC+1

Tunisia	3–1	Zambia
Laïdouni 18'; Dräger 31'; Maâloul 43'	Report	F. Sakala 80'

Stade Hammadi Agrebi, Tunis
Attendance: 0
Referee: Pacifique Ndabihawenimana (Burundi)
16 November 2021
19:00 UTC+0

Mauritania	1–1	Equatorial Guinea
Kamara 22'	Report	Coco 59'

Stade Olympique de Nouakchott, Nouakchott
Attendance: 500
Referee: Ahmad Imtehaz Heeralall (Mauritius)

=== Group C ===
Pos	Team	Pld	W	D	L	GF	GA	GD	Pts	Qualification	Nigeria	Cape Verde	Liberia	Central African Republic
1	Nigeria	6	4	1	1	9	3	+6	13	Advance to third round	—	1–1	2–0	0–1
2	Cape Verde	6	3	2	1	8	6	+2	11		1–2	—	1–0	2–1
3	Liberia	6	2	0	4	5	8	−3	6		0–2	1–2	—	3–1
4	Central African Republic	6	1	1	4	4	9	−5	4		0–2	1–1	0–1	—

Source: FIFA, Soccerway
Rules for classification: Tiebreakers
1 September 2021
14:00 UTC+1

Central African Republic	1–1	Cape Verde
Toropité 53'	Report	J. Tavares 36'

Japoma Stadium, Douala (Cameroon)
Attendance: 0
Referee: Peter Waweru (Kenya)
3 September 2021
17:00 UTC+1

Nigeria	2–0	Liberia
Iheanacho 22', 44'	Report

Teslim Balogun Stadium, Lagos
Attendance: 5,000
Referee: Kouassi Attisso Attiogbe (Togo)

6 September 2021
16:00 UTC+0

Central African Republic	0–1	Liberia
	Report	Sherman 86'

Japoma Stadium, Douala (Cameroon)
Attendance: 0
Referee: Sekou Ahmed Touré (Guinea)
7 September 2021
15:00 UTC−1

Cape Verde	1–2	Nigeria
D. Tavares 19'	Report	Osimhen 30'; Rocha 76' (o.g.)

Estádio Municipal Adérito Sena, Mindelo
Attendance: 500
Referee: Samir Guezzaz (Morocco)

7 October 2021
13:00 UTC+0

Liberia	1–2	Cape Verde
Harmon 45+3'	Report	Monteiro 52'; Rodrigues 90+2'

Accra Sports Stadium, Accra (Ghana)
Attendance: 0
Referee: Jean Ouattara (Burkina Faso)
7 October 2021
17:00 UTC+1

Nigeria	0–1	Central African Republic
	Report	Namnganda 90+1'

Teslim Balogun Stadium, Lagos
Attendance: 5,000
Referee: Abdelaziz Bouh (Mauritania)

10 October 2021
14:00 UTC+1

Central African Republic	0–2	Nigeria
	Report	Balogun 29'; Osimhen 45+1'

Japoma Stadium, Douala (Cameroon)
Attendance: 450
Referee: Louis Hakizimana (Rwanda)
10 October 2021
15:00 UTC−1

Cape Verde	1–0	Liberia
Mendes 90'	Report

Estádio Municipal Adérito Sena, Mindelo
Attendance: 2,000
Referee: Mohamed Ali Moussa (Niger)

13 November 2021
17:00 UTC+1

Liberia	0–2	Nigeria
	Report	Osimhen 15' (pen.); Musa 90+4' (pen.)

Stade Ibn Batouta, Tangier (Morocco)
Attendance: 0
Referee: Youssef Essrayri (Tunisia)
13 November 2021
15:00 UTC−1

Cape Verde	2–1	Central African Republic
J. Tavares 51'; Stopira 75'	Report	Ngoma 11'

Estádio Municipal Adérito Sena, Mindelo
Attendance: 3,000
Referee: Daniel Nii Laryea (Ghana)

16 November 2021
17:00 UTC+1

Nigeria	1–1	Cape Verde
Osimhen 1'	Report	Stopira 5'

Teslim Balogun Stadium, Lagos
Attendance: 8,000
Referee: Mustapha Ghorbal (Algeria)
16 November 2021
17:00 UTC+1

Liberia	3–1	Central African Republic
Macauley 2'; Wilson 8', 74'	Report	Ngoma 61'

Stade Ibn Batouta, Tangier (Morocco)
Attendance: 0
Referee: Ibrahim Kalilou Traore (Ivory Coast)

=== Group D ===
Pos	Team	Pld	W	D	L	GF	GA	GD	Pts	Qualification	Cameroon	Côte d'Ivoire	Mozambique	Malawi
1	Cameroon	6	5	0	1	12	3	+9	15	Advance to third round	—	1–0	3–1	2–0
2	Ivory Coast	6	4	1	1	10	3	+7	13		2–1	—	3–0	2–1
3	Mozambique	6	1	1	4	2	8	−6	4		0–1	0–0	—	1–0
4	Malawi	6	1	0	5	2	12	−10	3		0–4	0–3	1–0	—

Source: FIFA, Soccerway
Rules for classification: Tiebreakers
3 September 2021
15:00 UTC+2

Mozambique	0–0	Ivory Coast
	Report

Estádio Nacional do Zimpeto, Maputo
Attendance: 0
Referee: Pacifique Ndabihawenimana (Burundi)
3 September 2021
20:00 UTC+1

Cameroon	2–0	Malawi
Aboubakar 9'; Ngadeu-Ngadjui 22'	Report

Paul Biya Stadium, Yaoundé
Attendance: 250
Referee: Jean-Jacques Ndala (DR Congo)

6 September 2021
19:00 UTC+0

Ivory Coast	2–1	Cameroon
Haller 20' (pen.), 29'	Report	Ngamaleu 61' (pen.)

Stade Olympique Alassane Ouattara, Abidjan
Attendance: 10,000
Referee: Mehdi Abid Charef (Algeria)
7 September 2021
15:00 UTC+2

Malawi	1–0	Mozambique
Mbulu 10'	Report

Orlando Stadium, Johannesburg (South Africa)
Attendance: 0
Referee: Souleiman Ahmed Djama (Djibouti)

8 October 2021
15:00 UTC+2

Malawi	0–3	Ivory Coast
	Report	Gradel 36'; I. Sangaré 85'; Boga 90+5'

Orlando Stadium, Johannesburg (South Africa)
Attendance: 0
Referee: Peter Waweru (Kenya)
8 October 2021
17:00 UTC+1

Cameroon	3–1	Mozambique
Choupo-Moting 28', 51'; Toko Ekambi 63'	Report	Catamo 81'

Japoma Stadium, Douala
Attendance: 10,000
Referee: Mohamed Marouf (Egypt)

11 October 2021
14:00 UTC+1

Mozambique	0–1	Cameroon
	Report	Ngadeu-Ngadjui 68'

Stade Ibn Batouta, Tangier (Morocco)
Attendance: 0
Referee: Sabri Mohamed Fadul (Sudan)
11 October 2021
17:00 UTC+1

Ivory Coast	2–1	Malawi
Pépé 2'; Kessié 66' (pen.)	Report	Muyaba 20'

Stade de l'Amitié, Cotonou (Benin)
Attendance: 1,000
Referee: Bernard Camille (Seychelles)

13 November 2021
15:00 UTC+2

Malawi	0–4	Cameroon
	Report	Aboubakar 22' (pen.); Zambo Anguissa 42'; Bassogog 85', 87'

Orlando Stadium, Johannesburg (South Africa)
Attendance: 0
Referee: Issa Sy (Senegal)
13 November 2021
20:00 UTC+1

Ivory Coast	3–0	Mozambique
Gradel 10'; Cornet 61'; Seri 90'	Report

Stade de l'Amitié, Cotonou (Benin)
Attendance: 0
Referee: Ahmed El Ghandour (Egypt)

16 November 2021
14:00 UTC+1

Mozambique	1–0	Malawi
Mzava 51' (o.g.)	Report

Stade de l'Amitié, Cotonou (Benin)
Attendance: 0
Referee: Hassan Mohamed Hagi (Somalia)
16 November 2021
20:00 UTC+1

Cameroon	1–0	Ivory Coast
Toko Ekambi 21'	Report

Japoma Stadium, Douala
Attendance: 25,000
Referee: Janny Sikazwe (Zambia)

=== Group E ===
Pos	Team	Pld	W	D	L	GF	GA	GD	Pts	Qualification	Mali	Uganda	Kenya	Rwanda
1	Mali	6	5	1	0	11	0	+11	16	Advance to third round	—	1–0	5–0	1–0
2	Uganda	6	2	3	1	3	2	+1	9		0–0	—	1–1	1–0
3	Kenya	6	1	3	2	4	9	−5	6		0–1	0–0	—	2–1
4	Rwanda	6	0	1	5	2	9	−7	1		0–3	0–1	1–1	—

Source: FIFA, Soccerway
Rules for classification: Tiebreakers
1 September 2021
20:00 UTC+1

Mali	1–0	Rwanda
A. M. Traoré 19'	Report

Stade Adrar, Agadir (Morocco)
Attendance: 0
Referee: Beida Dahane (Mauritania)
2 September 2021
16:00 UTC+3

Kenya	0–0	Uganda
	Report

Nyayo National Stadium, Nairobi
Attendance: 560
Referee: Mahmood Ali Mahmood Ismail (Sudan)

5 September 2021
15:00 UTC+2

Rwanda	1–1	Kenya
Rwatubyaye 21'	Report	Olunga 10'

Nyamirambo Regional Stadium, Kigali
Attendance: 0
Referee: Joseph Odey Ogabor (Nigeria)
6 September 2021
16:00 UTC+3

Uganda	0–0	Mali
	Report

St. Mary's Stadium-Kitende, Entebbe
Attendance: 0
Referee: Ahmad Imtehaz Heeralall (Mauritius)

7 October 2021
18:00 UTC+2

Rwanda	0–1	Uganda
	Report	Bayo 41'

Nyamirambo Regional Stadium, Kigali
Attendance: 0
Referee: Joshua Bondo (Botswana)
7 October 2021
20:00 UTC+1

Mali	5–0	Kenya
A. M. Traoré 8'; Koné 22', 36', 45' (pen.); Doumbia 85'	Report

Stade Adrar, Agadir (Morocco)
Attendance: 0
Referee: Youssef Essrayri (Tunisia)

10 October 2021
16:00 UTC+3

Kenya	0–1	Mali
	Report	Koné 55'

Nyayo National Stadium, Nairobi
Attendance: 0
Referee: Blaise Yuven Ngwa (Cameroon)
10 October 2021
16:00 UTC+3

Uganda	1–0	Rwanda
Bayo 22'	Report

St. Mary's Stadium-Kitende, Entebbe
Attendance: 0
Referee: Haythem Guirat (Tunisia)

11 November 2021
16:00 UTC+3

Uganda	1–1	Kenya
Bayo 89'	Report	Olunga 62'

St. Mary's Stadium-Kitende, Entebbe
Attendance: 500
Referee: Souleiman Ahmed Djama (Djibouti)
11 November 2021
18:00 UTC+2

Rwanda	0–3	Mali
	Report	Djenepo 19'; Koné 21'; K. Coulibaly 87'

Nyamirambo Regional Stadium, Kigali
Attendance: 0
Referee: Hélder Martins de Carvalho (Angola)

14 November 2021
17:00 UTC+1

Mali	1–0	Uganda
K. Coulibaly 19'	Report

Stade Adrar, Agadir (Morocco)
Attendance: 0
Referee: Bamlak Tessema Weyesa (Ethiopia)
15 November 2021
16:00 UTC+3

Kenya	2–1	Rwanda
Olunga 2'; Odada 15' (pen.)	Report	Niyonzima 66'

Nyayo National Stadium, Nairobi
Attendance: 0
Referee: Celso Alvação (Mozambique)

=== Group F ===
Pos	Team	Pld	W	D	L	GF	GA	GD	Pts	Qualification	Egypt	Gabon	Libya	Angola
1	Egypt	6	4	2	0	10	4	+6	14	Advance to third round	—	2–1	1–0	1–0
2	Gabon	6	2	1	3	7	8	−1	7		1–1	—	1–0	2–0
3	Libya	6	2	1	3	4	7	−3	7		0–3	2–1	—	1–1
4	Angola	6	1	2	3	6	8	−2	5		2–2	3–1	0–1	—

Source: FIFA, Soccerway
Rules for classification: Tiebreakers
1 September 2021
21:00 UTC+2

Egypt	1–0	Angola
Magdy 5' (pen.)	Report

30 June Stadium, Cairo
Attendance: 0
Referee: Boubou Traoré (Mali)
1 September 2021
21:00 UTC+2

Libya	2–1	Gabon
Salama 27'; Al Warfali 90+5'	Report	Biyogo Poko 11'

Benina Martyrs Stadium, Benghazi
Attendance: 0
Referee: Bamlak Tessema Weyesa (Ethiopia)

5 September 2021
20:00 UTC+1

Gabon	1–1	Egypt
Allevinah 73'	Report	Mohamed 90'

Stade de Franceville, Franceville
Attendance: 0
Referee: Bakary Gassama (Gambia)
7 September 2021
20:00 UTC+1

Angola	0–1	Libya
	Report	Al Khouja 43'

Estádio 11 de Novembro, Luanda
Attendance: 10,000
Referee: Messie Nkounkou (Congo)

8 October 2021
18:30 UTC+1 (Note: The Angola v Gabon match, originally to be played at 17:00 UTC+1, was delayed by 90 minutes because the Gabonese players did not undergo COVID-19 tests when arriving Luanda.)

Angola	3–1	Gabon
Zini 25'; Ary Papel 56'; Buatu 90+1'	Report	Méyé 83'

Estádio 11 de Novembro, Luanda
Attendance: 5,000
Referee: Souleiman Ahmed Djama (Djibouti)
8 October 2021
21:00 UTC+2

Egypt	1–0	Libya
Marmoush 49'	Report

Borg El Arab Stadium, Alexandria
Attendance: 0
Referee: Pacifique Ndabihawenimana (Burundi)

11 October 2021
14:00 UTC+1

Gabon	2–0	Angola
Aubameyang 74'; Moussounda 84'	Report

Stade de Franceville, Franceville
Attendance: 0
Referee: Maguette N'Diaye (Senegal)
11 October 2021
21:00 UTC+2

Libya	0–3	Egypt
	Report	Fatouh 39'; Mohamed 45+4'; Sobhi 72'

Benina Martyrs Stadium, Benghazi
Attendance: 0
Referee: Victor Gomes (South Africa)

12 November 2021
17:00 UTC+1

Gabon	1–0	Libya
Aubameyang 54' (pen.)	Report

Stade de Franceville, Franceville
Attendance: 0
Referee: Mashood Ssali (Uganda)
12 November 2021
20:00 UTC+1

Angola	2–2	Egypt
Costa 25'; Nzola 35' (pen.)	Report	Elneny 45+1'; Tawfik 59'

Estádio 11 de Novembro, Luanda
Attendance: 15,000
Referee: Jean-Jacques Ndala (DR Congo)

16 November 2021
15:00 UTC+2

Egypt	2–1	Gabon
Magdy 4' (pen.); Obiang 75' (o.g.)	Report	Allevinah 54'

Borg El Arab Stadium, Alexandria
Attendance: 1,000
Referee: Georges Gatogato (Burundi)
16 November 2021
15:00 UTC+2

Libya	1–1	Angola
Al Warfali 49' (pen.)	Report	Zini 81'

28 March Stadium, Benghazi
Attendance: 0
Referee: Beida Dahane (Mauritania)

=== Group G ===
Pos	Team	Pld	W	D	L	GF	GA	GD	Pts	Qualification	Ghana	South Africa	Ethiopia	Zimbabwe
1	Ghana	6	4	1	1	7	3	+4	13	Advance to third round	—	1–0	1–0	3–1
2	South Africa	6	4	1	1	6	2	+4	13		1–0	—	1–0	1–0
3	Ethiopia	6	1	2	3	4	7	−3	5		1–1	1–3	—	1–0
4	Zimbabwe	6	0	2	4	2	7	−5	2		0–1	0–0	1–1	—

Source: FIFA, Soccerway
Rules for classification: Tiebreakers
3 September 2021
15:00 UTC+2

Zimbabwe	0–0	South Africa
	Report

National Sports Stadium, Harare
Attendance: 0
Referee: Mahmoud El Banna (Egypt)
3 September 2021
19:00 UTC+0

Ghana	1–0	Ethiopia
Wakaso 35'	Report

Cape Coast Sports Stadium, Cape Coast
Attendance: 2,250
Referee: Redouane Jiyed (Morocco)

6 September 2021
18:00 UTC+2

South Africa	1–0	Ghana
Hlongwane 83'	Report

FNB Stadium, Johannesburg
Attendance: 0
Referee: Derrick Kasokota Kafuli (Zambia)
7 September 2021
16:00 UTC+3

Ethiopia	1–0	Zimbabwe
Tamene 90+4' (pen.)	Report

Bahir Dar Stadium, Bahir Dar
Attendance: 0
Referee: Bernard Camille (Seychelles)

9 October 2021
16:00 UTC+3

Ethiopia	1–3	South Africa
Kebede 67'	Report	Mokoena 45+1'; Mvala 71'; Makgopa 90+1'

Bahir Dar Stadium, Bahir Dar
Attendance: 0
Referee: Shuhoub Abdulbasit (Libya)
9 October 2021
16:00 UTC+0

Ghana	3–1	Zimbabwe
Kudus 5'; Partey 66'; A. Ayew 87'	Report	Musona 49' (pen.)

Cape Coast Sports Stadium, Cape Coast
Referee: Pierre Atcho (Gabon)

12 October 2021
15:00 UTC+2

Zimbabwe	0–1	Ghana
	Report	Partey 31'

National Sports Stadium, Harare
Attendance: 0
Referee: Amin Omar (Egypt)
12 October 2021
18:00 UTC+2

South Africa	1–0	Ethiopia
Kebede 11' (o.g.)	Report

FNB Stadium, Johannesburg
Referee: Georges Gatogato (Burundi)

11 November 2021
15:00 UTC+2

Ethiopia	1–1	Ghana
Kebede 72'	Report	A. Ayew 22'

Orlando Stadium, Johannesburg (South Africa)
Attendance: 0
Referee: Blaise Yuven Ngwa (Cameroon)
11 November 2021
21:00 UTC+2

South Africa	1–0	Zimbabwe
Mokoena 26'	Report

FNB Stadium, Johannesburg
Attendance: 0
Referee: Sadok Selmi (Tunisia)

14 November 2021
15:00 UTC+2

Zimbabwe	1–1	Ethiopia
Mahachi 39'	Report	Nassir 86'

National Sports Stadium, Harare
Attendance: 0
Referee: Mohamed Ali Moussa (Niger)
14 November 2021
21:00 UTC+2

Ghana	1–0 (Note: An appeal by the South African Football Association alleging that the match had been fixed was declared inadmissible by FIFA.)	South Africa
A. Ayew 33' (pen.)	Report

Cape Coast Sports Stadium, Cape Coast
Attendance: 5,000
Referee: Maguette N'Diaye (Senegal)

=== Group H ===
Pos	Team	Pld	W	D	L	GF	GA	GD	Pts	Qualification	Senegal	Togo	Namibia	Republic of the Congo
1	Senegal	6	5	1	0	15	4	+11	16	Advance to third round	—	2–0	4–1	2–0
2	Togo	6	2	2	2	5	6	−1	8		1–1	—	0–1	1–1
3	Namibia	6	1	2	3	5	10	−5	5		1–3	0–1	—	1–1
4	Congo	6	0	3	3	5	10	−5	3		1–3	1–2	1–1	—

Source: FIFA, Soccerway
Rules for classification: Tiebreakers
1 September 2021
16:00 UTC+0

Senegal	2–0	Togo
Mané 56'; A. Diallo 81'	Report

Stade Lat-Dior, Thiès
Attendance: 0
Referee: Sadok Selmi (Tunisia)
2 September 2021
18:00 UTC+2

Namibia	1–1	Congo
Hambira 24'	Report	Hambira 57' (o.g.)

Orlando Stadium, Johannesburg (South Africa)
Attendance: 0
Referee: Andofetra Rakotojaona (Madagascar)

5 September 2021
16:00 UTC+0

Togo	0–1	Namibia
	Report	Kambindu 53'

Stade de Kégué, Lomé
Attendance: 0
Referee: Omar Abdulkadir Artan (Somalia)
7 September 2021
17:00 UTC+1

Congo	1–3	Senegal
Ganvoula 45+2' (pen.)	Report	Dia 27'; I. Sarr 82'; Mané 87' (pen.)

Stade Alphonse Massemba-Débat, Brazzaville
Attendance: 0
Referee: Mohamed Ali Moussa (Niger)

9 October 2021
16:00 UTC+0

Togo	1–1	Congo
Placca Fessou 56'	Report	Romao 21' (o.g.)

Stade de Kégué, Lomé
Referee: Sekou Ahmed Touré (Guinea)
9 October 2021
19:00 UTC+0

Senegal	4–1	Namibia
Gueye 10'; Diédhiou 38'; Mané 54'; Keita 83'	Report	Kamatuka 75'

Stade Lat-Dior, Thiès
Referee: Ibrahim Kalilou Traore (Ivory Coast)

12 October 2021
15:00 UTC+2

Namibia	1–3	Senegal
Shalulile 27'	Report	Diédhiou 22', 51', 84'

Orlando Stadium, Johannesburg (South Africa)
Attendance: 0
Referee: Mohamed Youssouf Athoumani (Comoros)
12 October 2021
17:00 UTC+1

Congo	1–2	Togo
Mbenza 71'	Report	Placca Fessou 43'; Denkey 77'

Stade Alphonse Massemba-Débat, Brazzaville
Attendance: 0
Referee: Djindo Louis Houngnandande (Benin)

11 November 2021
17:00 UTC+1

Congo	1–1	Namibia
Mbenza 54'	Report	Shalulile 42'

Stade Alphonse Massemba-Débat, Brazzaville
Attendance: 0
Referee: Samuel Uwikunda (Rwanda)
11 November 2021
19:00 UTC+0

Togo	1–1	Senegal
Cissé 45+1' (o.g.)	Report	H. Diallo 90+3'

Stade de Kégué, Lomé
Attendance: 0
Referee: Jalal Jayed (Morocco)

14 November 2021
21:00 UTC+2

Senegal	2–0	Congo
I. Sarr 14', 24'	Report

Stade Lat-Dior, Thiès
Attendance: 5,000
Referee: Fabricio Duarte (Cape Verde)
15 November 2021
15:00 UTC+2

Namibia	0–1	Togo
	Report	Placca Fessou 88'

Orlando Stadium, Johannesburg (South Africa)
Attendance: 0
Referee: Pierre Atcho (Gabon)

=== Group I ===
Pos	Team	Pld	W	D	L	GF	GA	GD	Pts	Qualification	Morocco	Guinea-Bissau	Guinea	Sudan
1	Morocco	6	6	0	0	20	1	+19	18	Advance to third round	—	5–0	3–0	2–0
2	Guinea-Bissau	6	1	3	2	5	11	−6	6		0–3	—	1–1	0–0
3	Guinea	6	0	4	2	5	11	−6	4		1–4	0–0	—	2–2
4	Sudan	6	0	3	3	5	12	−7	3		0–3	2–4	1–1	—

Source: FIFA, Soccerway
Rules for classification: Tiebreakers
1 September 2021
16:00 UTC+0

Guinea-Bissau	1–1	Guinea
Jos. Mendes 51'	Report	Kamano 7'

Stade Olympique, Nouakchott (Mauritania)
Attendance: 500
Referee: Mutaz Ibrahim (Libya)
2 September 2021
20:00 UTC+1

Morocco	2–0	Sudan
Aguerd 10'; Ab. Abdalla 53' (o.g.)	Report

Prince Moulay Abdellah Stadium, Rabat
Attendance: 0
Referee: Maguette N'Diaye (Senegal)

7 September 2021
21:00 UTC+2

Sudan	2–4	Guinea-Bissau
Abdel Rahman 55', 90+2'	Report	Piqueti 8', 39'; F. Mendy 11'; Mam. Baldé 82'

Al-Hilal Stadium, Omdurman
Attendance: 0
Referee: Victor Gomes (South Africa)

6 October 2021
17:00 UTC+1

Sudan	1–1	Guinea
Teiri 72'	Report	Bayo 56'

Marrakesh Stadium, Marrakesh (Morocco)
Attendance: 0
Referee: Janny Sikazwe (Zambia)
6 October 2021
20:00 UTC+1

Morocco	5–0	Guinea-Bissau
Hakimi 31'; Louza 45+1' (pen.); Chair 49'; El Kaabi 62'; Munir 82'	Report

Prince Moulay Abdellah Stadium, Rabat
Attendance: 0
Referee: Boubou Traoré (Mali)

9 October 2021
14:00 UTC+1

Guinea	2–2	Sudan
J. Kanté 48'; Bayo 67'	Report	Al-Tash 64'; Kamal 88'

Stade Adrar, Agadir (Morocco)
Attendance: 0
Referee: Mustapha Ghorbal (Algeria)
9 October 2021
20:00 UTC+1

Guinea-Bissau	0–3	Morocco
	Report	El Kaabi 10', 70'; Barkok 20'

Stade Mohamed V, Casablanca (Morocco)
Referee: Jean-Jacques Ndala (DR Congo)

12 October 2021 (Note: Originally to be played on 6 September 2021 at the General Lansana Conté Stadium in Conakry, the Guinea v Morocco match was postponed and relocated due to security concerns following the 2021 Guinean coup d'état.)
20:00 UTC+1

Guinea	1–4	Morocco
Kané 31'	Report	El Kaabi 21'; Amallah 43', 65'; Boufal 89'

Prince Moulay Abdellah Stadium, Rabat (Morocco)
Referee: Sidi Alioum (Cameroon)

12 November 2021
16:00 UTC+0

Guinea	0–0	Guinea-Bissau
	Report

General Lansana Conté Stadium, Conakry
Attendance: 0
Referee: Mohamed Marouf (Egypt)
12 November 2021
20:00 UTC+1

Sudan	0–3	Morocco
	Report	Mmaee 3', 61'; Louza 90+3'

Prince Moulay Abdellah Stadium, Rabat (Morocco)
Attendance: 0
Referee: Peter Waweru (Kenya)

15 November 2021
17:00 UTC+1

Guinea-Bissau	0–0	Sudan
	Report

Marrakesh Stadium, Marrakesh (Morocco)
Attendance: 0
Referee: Jean Ouattara (Burkina Faso)
16 November 2021
20:00 UTC+1

Morocco	3–0	Guinea
Mmaee 21' (pen.), 29'; El Kaabi 60'	Report

Stade Mohamed V, Casablanca
Attendance: 0
Referee: Joshua Bondo (Botswana)

=== Group J ===
Pos	Team	Pld	W	D	L	GF	GA	GD	Pts	Qualification	Democratic Republic of the Congo	Benin	Tanzania	Madagascar
1	DR Congo	6	3	2	1	9	3	+6	11	Advance to third round	—	2–0	1–1	2–0
2	Benin	6	3	1	2	5	4	+1	10		1–1	—	0–1	2–0
3	Tanzania	6	2	2	2	6	8	−2	8		0–3	0–1	—	3–2
4	Madagascar	6	1	1	4	4	9	−5	4		1–0	0–1	1–1	—

Source: FIFA, Soccerway
Rules for classification: Tiebreakers
2 September 2021
15:00 UTC+2

DR Congo	1–1	Tanzania
Mbokani 23'	Report	Msuva 36'

Stade TP Mazembe, Lubumbashi
Attendance: 0
Referee: Ibrahim Kalilou Traore (Ivory Coast)
2 September 2021
19:00 UTC+3

Madagascar	0–1	Benin
	Report	Mounié 22'

Mahamasina Municipal Stadium, Antananarivo
Attendance: 10,000
Referee: Brighton Chimene (Zimbabwe)

6 September 2021
14:00 UTC+1

Benin	1–1	DR Congo
Adéoti 33'	Report	Mbokani 11'

Stade de l'Amitié, Cotonou
Attendance: 5,000
Referee: Jean Ouattara (Burkina Faso)
7 September 2021
16:00 UTC+3

Tanzania	3–2	Madagascar
Nyoni 2' (pen.); Dismas 26'; Salum 53'	Report	Rakotoharimalala 36'; Fontaine 45+2'

National Stadium, Dar es Salaam
Attendance: 0
Referee: Mashood Ssali (Uganda)

7 October 2021
14:00 UTC+1

DR Congo	2–0	Madagascar
Akolo 35'; Mbokani 78' (pen.)	Report

Stade des Martyrs, Kinshasa
Attendance: 0
Referee: Antonio Caluassi Dungula (Angola)
7 October 2021
16:00 UTC+3

Tanzania	0–1	Benin
	Report	Mounié 72'

National Stadium, Dar es Salaam
Attendance: 500
Referee: Celso Alvação (Mozambique)

10 October 2021
14:00 UTC+1

Benin	0–1	Tanzania
	Report	Msuva 6'

Stade de l'Amitié, Cotonou
Attendance: 15,000
Referee: Omar Abdulkadir Artan (Somalia)
10 October 2021
19:00 UTC+3

Madagascar	1–0	DR Congo
Rakotoharimalala 1'	Report

Mahamasina Municipal Stadium, Antananarivo
Attendance: 1,500
Referee: Patrice Milazare (Mauritius)

11 November 2021
16:00 UTC+3

Tanzania	0–3	DR Congo
	Report	Kakuta 6'; Fasika 66'; Malango 85'

National Stadium, Dar es Salaam
Attendance: 10,000
Referee: Bernard Camille (Seychelles)
11 November 2021
17:00 UTC+1

Benin	2–0	Madagascar
Dossou 43'; Mounié 79'	Report

Stade de l'Amitié, Cotonou
Attendance: 15,000
Referee: Bakary Gassama (Gambia)

14 November 2021
14:00 UTC+1

DR Congo	2–0 (Note: An appeal by the Benin Football Federation alleging that DR Congo had violated the substitution rules in the match was declared inadmissible by FIFA.)	Benin
Mbokani 10' (pen.); Malango 74'	Report

Stade des Martyrs, Kinshasa
Attendance: 500
Referee: Eric Otogo-Castane (Gabon)
14 November 2021
16:00 UTC+3

Madagascar	1–1	Tanzania
Abdallah 74'	Report	Msuva 25'

Mahamasina Municipal Stadium, Antananarivo
Attendance: 30,000
Referee: Messie Nkounkou (Republic of Congo)

== Goalscorers ==
There were 289 goals scored in 120 matches, for an average of 2.41 goals per match.

7 goals

- (Algeria national football team) Islam Slimani

5 goals

- (Algeria national football team) Riyad Mahrez
- (Mali national football team) Ibrahima Koné
- (Morocco national football team) Ayoub El Kaabi
- (Niger national football team) Victorien Adebayor
- (Zambia national football team) Fashion Sakala

4 goals

- (Burkina Faso national football team) Abdoul Tapsoba
- (DR Congo national football team) Dieumerci Mbokani
- (Morocco national football team) Ryan Mmaee
- (Nigeria national football team) Victor Osimhen
- (Senegal national football team) Famara Diédhiou

3 goals

- (Algeria national football team) Sofiane Feghouli
- (Benin national football team) Steve Mounié
- (Burkina Faso national football team) Issoufou Dayo
- (Ghana national football team) André Ayew
- (Kenya national football team) Michael Olunga
- (Senegal national football team) Sadio Mané
- (Senegal national football team) Ismaïla Sarr
- (Tanzania national football team) Simon Msuva
- (Togo national football team) Euloge Placca Fessou
- (Tunisia national football team) Wahbi Khazri
- (Uganda national football team) Fahad Bayo

2 goals

- (Algeria national football team) Baghdad Bounedjah
- (Angola national football team) Zini
- (Burkina Faso national football team) Mohamed Konaté
- (Cameroon national football team) Vincent Aboubakar
- (Cameroon national football team) Christian Bassogog
- (Cameroon national football team) Eric Maxim Choupo-Moting
- (Cameroon national football team) Michael Ngadeu-Ngadjui
- (Cameroon national football team) Karl Toko Ekambi
- (Cape Verde national football team) Stopira
- (Cape Verde national football team) Júlio Tavares
- (Central African Republic national football team) Isaac Ngoma
- (Congo national football team) Silvère Ganvoula
- (Congo national football team) Guy Mbenza
- (DR Congo national football team) Ben Malango
- (Egypt national football team) Mohamed Magdy
- (Egypt national football team) Mostafa Mohamed
- (Equatorial Guinea national football team) Saúl Coco
- (Ethiopia national football team) Getaneh Kebede
- (Gabon national football team) Jim Allevinah
- (Gabon national football team) Pierre-Emerick Aubameyang
- (Ghana national football team) Thomas Partey
- (Guinea national football team) Mohamed Bayo
- (Guinea-Bissau national football team) Piqueti
- (Ivory Coast national football team) Max Gradel
- (Ivory Coast national football team) Sébastien Haller
- (Liberia national football team) Peter Wilson
- (Libya national football team) Sanad Al Warfali
- (Madagascar national football team) Njiva Rakotoharimalala
- (Mali national football team) Kalifa Coulibaly
- (Mali national football team) Adama M. Traoré
- (Morocco national football team) Selim Amallah
- (Morocco national football team) Imran Louza
- (Namibia national football team) Peter Shalulile
- (Niger national football team) Issa Djibrilla
- (Niger national football team) Daniel Sosah
- (Niger national football team) Mohamed Wonkoye
- (Nigeria national football team) Kelechi Iheanacho
- (South Africa national soccer team) Teboho Mokoena
- (Sudan national football team) Mohamed Abdel Rahman
- (Tunisia national football team) Ellyes Skhiri

1 goal

- (Algeria national football team) Youcef Belaïli
- (Algeria national football team) Ismaël Bennacer
- (Algeria national football team) Saïd Benrahma
- (Algeria national football team) Ramy Bensebaini
- (Algeria national football team) Aïssa Mandi
- (Algeria national football team) Ramiz Zerrouki
- (Angola national football team) Ary Papel
- (Angola national football team) Jonathan Buatu
- (Angola national football team) Hélder Costa
- (Angola national football team) M'Bala Nzola
- (Benin national football team) Jordan Adéoti
- (Benin national football team) Jodel Dossou
- (Burkina Faso national football team) Issa Kaboré
- (Burkina Faso national football team) Zakaria Sanogo
- (Burkina Faso national football team) Lassina Traoré
- (Cameroon national football team) Nicolas Ngamaleu
- (Cameroon national football team) André-Frank Zambo Anguissa
- (Cape Verde national football team) Ryan Mendes
- (Cape Verde national football team) Jamiro Monteiro
- (Cape Verde national football team) Garry Rodrigues
- (Cape Verde national football team) Dylan Tavares
- (Central African Republic national football team) Karl Namnganda
- (Central African Republic national football team) Tresór Toropité
- (Djibouti national football team) Youssouf Abdi Ahmed
- (Djibouti national football team) Anas Farah Ali
- (Djibouti national football team) Warsama Hassan
- (Djibouti national football team) Yabe Siad Isman
- (DR Congo national football team) Chadrac Akolo
- (DR Congo national football team) Nathan Fasika
- (DR Congo national football team) Gaël Kakuta
- (Egypt national football team) Mohamed Elneny
- (Egypt national football team) Ahmed Fatouh
- (Egypt national football team) Omar Marmoush
- (Egypt national football team) Ramadan Sobhi
- (Egypt national football team) Akram Tawfik
- (Equatorial Guinea national football team) Federico Bikoro
- (Equatorial Guinea national football team) Pablo Ganet
- (Equatorial Guinea national football team) Emilio Nsue
- (Equatorial Guinea national football team) Iban Salvador
- (Ethiopia national football team) Abubeker Nassir
- (Ethiopia national football team) Aschalew Tamene
- (Gabon national football team) André Biyogo Poko
- (Gabon national football team) Axel Méyé
- (Gabon national football team) Alex Moucketou-Moussounda
- (Ghana national football team) Mohammed Kudus
- (Ghana national football team) Mubarak Wakaso
- (Guinea national football team) François Kamano
- (Guinea national football team) Mamadou Kané
- (Guinea national football team) José Kanté
- (Guinea-Bissau national football team) Mama Baldé
- (Guinea-Bissau national football team) Joseph Mendes
- (Guinea-Bissau national football team) Frédéric Mendy
- (Ivory Coast national football team) Jérémie Boga
- (Ivory Coast national football team) Maxwel Cornet
- (Ivory Coast national football team) Franck Kessié
- (Ivory Coast national football team) Nicolas Pépé
- (Ivory Coast national football team) Ibrahim Sangaré
- (Ivory Coast national football team) Jean Michaël Seri
- (Kenya national football team) Richard Odada
- (Liberia national football team) Van-Dave Harmon
- (Liberia national football team) Marcus Macauley
- (Liberia national football team) Kpah Sherman
- (Libya national football team) Omar Al Khouja
- (Libya national football team) Ali Salama
- (Madagascar national football team) Hakim Abdallah
- (Madagascar national football team) Thomas Fontaine
- (Malawi national football team) Richard Mbulu
- (Malawi national football team) Khuda Muyaba
- (Mali national football team) Moussa Djenepo
- (Mali national football team) Moussa Doumbia
- (Mauritania national football team) Aboubakar Kamara
- (Mauritania national football team) Mamadou Niass
- (Morocco national football team) Nayef Aguerd
- (Morocco national football team) Aymen Barkok
- (Morocco national football team) Sofiane Boufal
- (Morocco national football team) Ilias Chair
- (Morocco national football team) Munir El Haddadi
- (Morocco national football team) Achraf Hakimi
- (Mozambique national football team) Geny Catamo
- (Namibia national football team) Charles Hambira
- (Namibia national football team) Joslin Kamatuka
- (Namibia national football team) Elmo Kambindu
- (Niger national football team) Youssouf Oumarou
- (Niger national football team) Amadou Sabo
- (Nigeria national football team) Leon Balogun
- (Nigeria national football team) Ahmed Musa
- (Rwanda national football team) Olivier Niyonzima
- (Rwanda national football team) Abdul Rwatubyaye
- (Senegal national football team) Keita Baldé
- (Senegal national football team) Boulaye Dia
- (Senegal national football team) Abdou Diallo
- (Senegal national football team) Habib Diallo
- (Senegal national football team) Idrissa Gueye
- (South Africa national soccer team) Bongokuhle Hlongwane
- (South Africa national soccer team) Evidence Makgopa
- (South Africa national soccer team) Mothobi Mvala
- (Sudan national football team) Ahmed Al-Tash
- (Sudan national football team) Amir Kamal
- (Sudan national football team) Seif Teiri
- (Tanzania national football team) Novatus Dismas
- (Tanzania national football team) Erasto Nyoni
- (Tanzania national football team) Faisal Salum
- (Togo national football team) Kévin Denkey
- (Tunisia national football team) Dylan Bronn
- (Tunisia national football team) Mohamed Dräger
- (Tunisia national football team) Seifeddine Jaziri
- (Tunisia national football team) Aïssa Laïdouni
- (Tunisia national football team) Ali Maâloul
- (Tunisia national football team) Anis Ben Slimane
- (Zambia national football team) Patson Daka
- (Zambia national football team) Prince Mumba
- (Zambia national football team) Enock Mwepu
- (Zimbabwe national football team) Kudakwashe Mahachi
- (Zimbabwe national football team) Knowledge Musona

1 own goal

- (Cape Verde national football team) Kenny Rocha (against Nigeria)
- (Ethiopia national football team) Getaneh Kebede (against South Africa)
- (Gabon national football team) Johann Obiang (against Egypt)
- (Malawi national football team) Limbikani Mzava (against Mozambique)
- (Namibia national football team) Charles Hambira (against Congo)
- (Niger national football team) Youssouf Oumarou (against Algeria)
- (Niger national football team) Zakariya Souleymane (against Algeria)
- (Senegal national football team) Pape Abou Cissé (against Togo)
- (Sudan national football team) Abuaagla Abdalla (against Morocco)
- (Togo national football team) Alaixys Romao (against Congo)
