= Yussif Moussa =

Nigerien footballer

Personal information
- Full name: Yussif Daouda Moussa
- Date of birth: 4 September 1998 (age 28)
- Place of birth: Nima, Ghana
- Height: 1.74 m (5 ft 9 in)
- Position: Midfielder

Team information
- Current team: Al-Madina
- Number: 23

Senior career*
Years	Team	Apps	(Gls)
2016–2019	Police		
2019–2020	Ilves	24	(2)
2020–2021	Bnei Yehuda	16	(0)
2022–2023	Ilves	33	(0)
2024	Al-Talaba		
2024–	Al-Madina		

International career^{‡}
2017–	Niger	15	(1)
- * Club domestic league appearances and goals as of 20 January 2025 ‡ National team caps and goals as of 19 April 2023

Yussif Daouda Moussa (born 4 September 1998) is a professional footballer who plays as a midfielder for Libyan club Al-Madina. Born in Ghana, he plays for the Niger national football team.

== Club career ==
On 9 December 2021, he agreed to return to Ilves in Finland on a one-year contract.

== International career ==
Born and raised in Ghana, Moussa was discovered by Nigerien scouts and moved to the country to find more opportunities. Naturalized as a Nigerien, he represented Niger youth national teams before debuting with the senior Niger national team in 2017.

== Career statistics ==
=== Club ===
As of 29 October 2019.

Club	Season	League			Cup		Continental		Other		Total	
Club	Season	Division	Apps	Goals	Apps	Goals	Apps	Goals	Apps	Goals	Apps	Goals
Ilves	2019	Veikkausliiga	23	2	2	0	–		–		25	2
Ilves	2020	Veikkausliiga	1	0	0	0	0	0	–		1	0
Ilves	Total		24	2	2	0	0	0	0	0	26	2
Bnei Yehuda	2020–21	Israeli Premier League	16	0	0	0	–		–		16	0
Ilves	2022	Veikkausliiga	8	0	1	0	–		4	0	13	0
Ilves	2023	Veikkausliiga	25	0	5	0	–		4	0	34	0
Ilves	Total		33	0	6	0	0	0	8	0	47	0
Al-Talaba	2023–24	Iraq Stars League					–		–			
Al-Madina	2024–25	Libyan Premier League	2	0	0	0	–		–		2	0
Career total			75	2	8	0	0	0	8	0	91	2

=== International ===
As of match played 19 November 2019.

National team	Year	Apps	Goals
Niger	2017	2	0
Niger	2018	1	0
Niger	2019	3	1
Total		6	1

=== International goals ===
Scores and results Niger's goal tally first.

No.	Date	Venue	Opponent	Score	Result	Competition
1.	19 November 2019	Stade Général Seyni Kountché, Niamey, Niger	Madagascar	2–6	2–6	2021 Africa Cup of Nations qualification
