= 2022 FIFA World Cup qualification – CAF third round =

The third round of CAF matches for 2022 FIFA World Cup qualification was played from 25 to 29 March 2022. The ten group winners from the second round were drawn into five home-and-away ties. The five overall winners of these fixtures qualified for the FIFA World Cup.

== Qualified teams ==
Group (second round)	Winners
A	Algeria
B	Tunisia
C	Nigeria
D	Cameroon
E	Mali
F	Egypt
G	Ghana
H	Senegal
I	Morocco
J	DR Congo

== Draw and seeding ==
The draw for the third round was held on 22 January 2022 in Douala, Cameroon, starting at 16:00 (UTC+1). The seedings were based on the November 2021 FIFA World Rankings (shown in parentheses). Teams from Pot 2 hosted the first leg, while teams from Pot 1 hosted the second leg.

Note: Bolded teams qualified for the World Cup.

Pot 1	Pot 2
**Senegal** (20); **Morocco** (28); **Tunisia** (29); Algeria (32); Nigeria (36)	Egypt (45); **Cameroon** (50); **Ghana** (52); Mali (53); DR Congo (64)

== Summary ==
Team 1	Agg.	Team 2	1st leg	2nd leg
Egypt	1–1 (1–3 p)	**Senegal**	1–0	0–1 (a.e.t.)
**Cameroon**	2–2 (a)	Algeria	0–1	2–1 (a.e.t.)
**Ghana**	1–1 (a)	Nigeria	0–0	1–1
DR Congo	2–5	**Morocco**	1–1	1–4
Mali	0–1	**Tunisia**	0–1	0–0

== Matches ==
25 March 2022
21:30 UTC+2

Egypt	1–0	Senegal
Ciss 4' (o.g.)	Report

Cairo International Stadium, Cairo
Attendance: 65,000
Referee: Jean-Jacques Ndala (DR Congo)
29 March 2022
17:00 UTC+0

Senegal	1–0 (a.e.t.)	Egypt
Dia 3'	Report
Penalties
Koulibaly (penalty missed); Ciss (penalty missed); I. Sarr (penalty scored); Dieng (penalty scored); Mané (penalty scored)	3–1	(penalty missed) Salah; (penalty missed) Zizo; (penalty scored) El Solia; (penalty missed) Mohamed

Diamniadio Olympic Stadium, Dakar
Attendance: 50,000
Referee: Mustapha Ghorbal (Algeria)

1–1 on aggregate. Senegal won 3–1 on penalties and qualified for the 2022 FIFA World Cup.

25 March 2022
18:00 UTC+1

Cameroon	0–1	Algeria
	Report	Slimani 40'

Japoma Stadium, Douala
Attendance: 40,000
Referee: Joshua Bondo (Botswana)
29 March 2022
20:30 UTC+1

Algeria	1–2 (a.e.t.)	Cameroon
Touba 118'	Report	Choupo-Moting 22'; Toko Ekambi 120+4'

Mustapha Tchaker Stadium, Blida
Attendance: 40,000
Referee: Bakary Gassama (Gambia)

2–2 on aggregate. Cameroon won on away goals and qualified for the 2022 FIFA World Cup.

25 March 2022
19:30 UTC+0

Ghana	0–0	Nigeria
	Report

Baba Yara Stadium, Kumasi
Attendance: 40,000
Referee: Redouane Jiyed (Morocco)
29 March 2022
18:00 UTC+1

Nigeria	1–1	Ghana
Troost-Ekong 22' (pen.)	Report	Partey 10'

Moshood Abiola National Stadium, Abuja
Attendance: 60,000
Referee: Sadok Selmi (Tunisia)

1–1 on aggregate. Ghana won on away goals and qualified for the 2022 FIFA World Cup.

25 March 2022
16:00 UTC+1

DR Congo	1–1	Morocco
Wissa 12'	Report	Tissoudali 76'

Stade des Martyrs, Kinshasa
Attendance: 25,000
Referee: Victor Gomes (South Africa)
29 March 2022
20:30 UTC+1

Morocco	4–1	DR Congo
Ounahi 21', 54'; Tissoudali 45+7'; Hakimi 69'	Report	Malango 77'

Stade Mohammed V, Casablanca
Attendance: 45,891
Referee: Pacifique Ndabihawenimana (Burundi)

Morocco won 5–2 on aggregate and qualified for the 2022 FIFA World Cup.

25 March 2022
17:00 UTC+0

Mali	0–1	Tunisia
	Report	Sissako 36' (o.g.)

Stade du 26 Mars, Bamako
Attendance: 50,000
Referee: Bamlak Tessema Weyesa (Ethiopia)
29 March 2022
20:30 UTC+1

Tunisia	0–0	Mali
	Report

Stade Hammadi Agrebi, Tunis
Attendance: 50,000
Referee: Maguette N'Diaye (Senegal)

Tunisia won 1–0 on aggregate and qualified for the 2022 FIFA World Cup.

== Goalscorers ==
There were 16 goals scored in 10 matches, for an average of 1.6 goals per match.

2 goals

- (Morocco national football team) Azzedine Ounahi
- (Morocco national football team) Tarik Tissoudali

1 goal

- (Algeria national football team) Islam Slimani
- (Algeria national football team) Ahmed Touba
- (Cameroon national football team) Eric Maxim Choupo-Moting
- (Cameroon national football team) Karl Toko Ekambi
- (DR Congo national football team) Ben Malango
- (DR Congo national football team) Yoane Wissa
- (Ghana national football team) Thomas Partey
- (Morocco national football team) Achraf Hakimi
- (Nigeria national football team) William Troost-Ekong
- (Senegal national football team) Boulaye Dia

1 own goal

- (Mali national football team) Moussa Sissako (against Tunisia)
- (Senegal national football team) Saliou Ciss (against Egypt)
