= Charles Hambira =

Namibian footballer

Personal information
- Full name: Vetunuavi Charles Hambira
- Date of birth: 3 June 1990 (age 36)
- Place of birth: Windhoek, Namibia
- Height: 1.80 m (5 ft 11 in)
- Position: Centre-back

Team information
- Current team: TS Sporting

Senior career*
Years	Team	Apps	(Gls)
2010–2011	Otjinene All Stars		
2011–2012	Black Africa		
2012–2019	Tura Magic		
2019–	TS Sporting	14	(0)

International career^{‡}
2017–	Namibia	40	(3)
Medal record
Men's football
Representing Namibia
COSAFA Cup
Runner-up	2024 South Africa
- * Club domestic league appearances and goals as of 20:38, 4 August 2020 (UTC) ‡ National team caps and goals as of 20:38, 19 November 2024 (UTC)

Vetunuavi Charles Hambira (born 3 June 1990) is a Namibian footballer who plays as a centre-back for National First Division side TS Sporting and the Namibia national football team.

== Career statistics ==
=== International ===
As of match played 19 November 2024

Appearances and goals by national team and year
National team	Year	Apps	Goals
Namibia	2017	2	0
Namibia	2018	8	1
Namibia	2019	2	1
Namibia	2021	12	1
Namibia	2022	1	0
Namibia	2023	2	0
Namibia	2024	15	0
Total		40	3

=== International goals ===
As of 2 September 2021. Namibia score listed first, score column indicates score after each Hambira goal.

International goals by date, venue, cap, opponent, score, result and competition
No.	Date	Venue	Opponent	Score	Result	Competition	Ref.
1	14 January 2018	Stade de Marrakech, Marrakech, Morocco	Ivory Coast	1–0	1–0	2018 African Nations Championship	
2	28 May 2019	King Zwelithini Stadium, Durban, South Africa	Malawi	1–0	1–2	2019 COSAFA Cup	
3	2 September 2021	Orlando Stadium, Johannesburg, South Africa	Congo	1–0	1–1	2022 FIFA World Cup qualification	
