= 2026 FIFA World Cup qualification – CAF Group E =

Association football competition in Africa

The 2026 FIFA World Cup qualification – CAF Group E was a CAF qualifying group for the 2026 FIFA World Cup. The group contained Morocco, Zambia, Congo, Tanzania and Niger.

Eritrea were drawn into the group but withdrew before the first matches were played.

Congo were suspended on 6 February 2025 due to government interference in Congolese Football Federation operations. No announcement regarding their status was immediately available, and CAF initially cancelled their remaining matches. However, Tanzania and Zambia were later awarded 3–0 victories by forfeit. The suspension was lifted by FIFA on 14 May 2025.

The group winners, Morocco, directly qualified for the World Cup. The group runners-up, Niger, were eliminated as one of the five worst runners-up.

== Standings ==
Pos	Team	Pld	W	D	L	GF	GA	GD	Pts	Qualification	(Morocco)	(Niger)	(Tanzania)	(Zambia)	(Republic of the Congo)	(Eritrea)
1	Morocco	8	8	0	0	22	2	+20	24	2026 FIFA World Cup	—	5–0	2–0	2–1	1–0	~~Canc.~~
2	Niger	8	5	0	3	11	10	+1	15		1–2	—	0–1	2–1	3–1	~~Canc.~~
3	Tanzania	8	3	1	4	6	7	−1	10		0–2	0–1	—	0–1	3–0 (Note: Congo were suspended on 6 February 2025 due to government interference in Congolese Football Federation operations. No announcement regarding their status was immediately available, and CAF initially cancelled their remaining matches, but Tanzania and Zambia were later awarded 3–0 victories by forfeit. The suspension was lifted by FIFA on 14 May 2025.)	~~Canc.~~
4	Zambia	8	3	0	5	10	10	0	9		0–2	0–1	0–1	—	4–2	~~Canc.~~
5	Congo	8	0	1	7	4	24	−20	1		0–6	0–3 (Note: Niger were awarded a 3–0 victory by forfeit after Congo objected to their regular stadium being deemed to not meet hosting requirements and refused to travel to DR Congo for the match.)	1–1	0–3	—	~~Canc.~~
6	Eritrea (Note: Eritrea withdrew from qualification after the draw due to concerns that players would seek political asylum if allowed to travel abroad.)	0	0	0	0	0	0	0	0	Withdrew	~~Canc.~~	~~Canc.~~	~~Canc.~~	~~Canc.~~	~~Canc.~~	—

Source: FIFA
Rules for classification: Tiebreakers

== Matches ==
16 November 2023
20:00 UTC+1

Morocco	Cancelled	Eritrea
	Report

Adrar Stadium, Agadir
17 November 2023
18:00 UTC+2

Zambia	4–2	Congo
Daka 5', 90+2'; L. Banda 43'; F. Sakala 69'	Report	Ganvoula 13'; Bassouamina 15'

Levy Mwanawasa Stadium, Ndola
Referee: Mahmoud El Banna (Egypt)
18 November 2023
17:00 UTC+1

Niger	0–1	Tanzania
	Report	M'Mombwa 56'

Marrakesh Stadium, Marrakesh (Morocco)
Attendance: 178
Referee: Lotfi Bekouassa (Algeria)

20 November 2023
17:00 UTC+1

Eritrea	Cancelled	Congo
	Report

Adrar Stadium, Agadir (Morocco)
21 November 2023
20:00 UTC+1

Niger	2–1	Zambia
Moutari 6'; Goumey 28'	Report	Daka 50'

Marrakesh Stadium, Marrakesh (Morocco)
Attendance: 200
Referee: Abdulrazg Ahmed (Libya)
21 November 2023
22:00 UTC+3

Tanzania	0–2	Morocco
	Report	Ziyech 28'; Mwamnyeto 54' (o.g.)

National Stadium, Dar es Salaam
Attendance: 60,000
Referee: Abongile Tom (South Africa)

June 2024

Tanzania	Cancelled	Eritrea

6 June 2024
17:00 UTC+1

Congo	0–3 Awarded (Note: Niger were awarded a 3–0 victory by forfeit after Congo refused to travel to DR Congo for the match, after their regular stadium was deemed to not meet hosting requirements.)	Niger
	Report

Stade des Martyrs, Kinshasa (DR Congo)
Referee: Boubou Traore (Mali)
7 June 2024
20:00 UTC+1

Morocco	2–1	Zambia
Ziyech 6' (pen.); Ben Seghir 67'	Report	Chilufya 80'

Adrar Stadium, Agadir
Referee: Issa Sy (Senegal)

June 2024

Eritrea	Cancelled	Niger

11 June 2024
15:00 UTC+2

Zambia	0–1	Tanzania
	Report	Shentembo 5'

Levy Mwanawasa Stadium, Ndola
Referee: Abdel Aziz Bouh (Mauritania)
11 June 2024
17:00 UTC+1

Congo	0–6	Morocco
	Report	Ounahi 8'; Riad 16'; El Kaabi 30', 39', 53'; Rahimi 62'

Adrar Stadium, Agadir (Morocco)
Attendance: 30,000
Referee: Daniel Nii Laryea (Ghana)

March 2025

Zambia	Cancelled	Eritrea

March 2025

Tanzania	3–0 Awarded (Note: Tanzania and Zambia were awarded 3–0 victories by forfeit due to Congo's suspension.)	Congo
	Report

21 March 2025
21:30 UTC+0

Niger	1–2	Morocco
Oumarou 47'	Report	Saibari 59'; El Khannouss 90+1'

Honor Stadium, Oujda (Morocco)
Attendance: 20,000
Referee: Omar Artan (Somalia)

March 2025

Niger	Cancelled	Eritrea

March 2025

Congo	0–3 Awarded	Zambia
	Report

25 March 2025
21:30 UTC+0

Morocco	2–0	Tanzania
Aguerd 51'; Brahim 58' (pen.)	Report

Honor Stadium, Oujda
Referee: Alhadi Allaou Mahamat (Chad)

September 2025

Eritrea	Cancelled	Zambia

5 September 2025
17:00 UTC+1

Congo	1–1	Tanzania
Moussavou 68'	Report	Mwalimu 84'

Stade Alphonse Massemba-Débat, Brazzaville
Referee: Thabang Ketshabile (Botswana)
5 September 2025
20:00 UTC+1

Morocco	5–0	Niger
Saibari 29', 38'; El Kaabi 51'; Igamane 69'; Ounahi 84'	Report

Prince Moulay Abdellah Stadium, Rabat
Attendance: 63,000
Referee: Jean-Jacques Ndala (DR Congo)

September 2025

Congo	Cancelled	Eritrea

8 September 2025
15:00 UTC+2

Zambia	0–2	Morocco
	Report	En-Nesyri 7'; Igamane 47'

Levy Mwanawasa Stadium, Ndola
Attendance: 49,800
Referee: Djindo Louis Houngnandande (Benin)
9 September 2025
16:00 UTC+3

Tanzania	0–1	Niger
	Report	Sosah 58'

Amaan Stadium, Zanzibar City
Referee: Mustapha Ghorbal (Algeria)

October 2025

Eritrea	Cancelled	Morocco

8 October 2025
19:00 UTC+0

Niger	3–1	Congo
Sosah 45+2'; Oumarou 49'; Adebayor 67'	Report	Bassinga 90+4'

Stade du 4 Août, Ouagadougou (Burkina Faso)
Referee: Boubou Traoré (Mali)
8 October 2025
22:00 UTC+3

Tanzania	0–1	Zambia
	Report	F. Sakala 75'

Amaan Stadium, Zanzibar City
Referee: Ibrahim Kalilou Traore (Côte d'Ivoire)

October 2025

Eritrea	Cancelled	Tanzania

12 October 2025
15:00 UTC+2

Zambia	0–1	Niger
	Report	Sosah 56'

Levy Mwanawasa Stadium, Ndola
Attendance: 49,800
Referee: Lucky Kasalirwe (Uganda)
14 October 2025
20:00 UTC+1

Morocco	1–0	Congo
En-Nesyri 63'	Report

Prince Moulay Abdellah Stadium, Rabat
Referee: Abdel Aziz Bouh (Mauritania)

== Goalscorers ==
There were 44 goals scored in 17 matches, for an average of 2.59 goals per match.

4 goals

- (Morocco national football team) Ayoub El Kaabi

3 goals

- (Morocco national football team) Ismael Saibari
- (Niger national football team) Daniel Sosah
- (Zambia national football team) Patson Daka

2 goals

- (Morocco national football team) Youssef En-Nesyri
- (Morocco national football team) Hamza Igamane
- (Morocco national football team) Azzedine Ounahi
- (Morocco national football team) Hakim Ziyech
- (Niger national football team) Youssouf Oumarou
- (Zambia national football team) Fashion Sakala

1 goal

- (Congo national football team) Déo Bassinga
- (Congo national football team) Mons Bassouamina
- (Congo national football team) Silvère Ganvoula
- (Congo national football team) Dechan Moussavou
- (Morocco national football team) Nayef Aguerd
- (Morocco national football team) Eliesse Ben Seghir
- (Morocco national football team) Brahim Díaz
- (Morocco national football team) Bilal El Khannouss
- (Morocco national football team) Soufiane Rahimi
- (Morocco national football team) Chadi Riad
- (Niger national football team) Victorien Adebayor
- (Niger national football team) Boubacar Goumey
- (Niger national football team) Amadou Moutari
- (Tanzania national football team) Charles M'Mombwa
- (Tanzania national football team) Selemani Mwalimu
- (Tanzania national football team) Waziri Shentembo
- (Zambia national football team) Lameck Banda
- (Zambia national football team) Edward Chilufya

1 own goal

- (Tanzania national football team) Bakari Mwamnyeto (against Morocco)

== Discipline ==
A player was automatically suspended for the next match for the following infractions:

- Receiving a red card (red card suspensions could be extended for serious infractions)
- Receiving two yellow cards in two different matches (yellow card suspensions were carried forward to further qualification rounds, but not the finals or any other future international matches)

The following suspensions were served during the group stage:

Team	Player	Infraction(s)	Suspended for match(es)
Morocco	Achraf Hakimi	(yellow card) vs Tanzania (21 November 2023); (yellow card) vs Niger (21 March 2025)	vs Tanzania (25 March 2025)
Niger	Salifou Massoudi	(yellow card) vs Tanzania (18 November 2023); (yellow card) vs Zambia (21 November 2023)	vs Morocco (21 March 2025)
Niger	Abdoul Latif Djibril	(yellow card) (yellow-red card) vs Morocco (5 September 2025)	vs Tanzania (9 September 2025) vs Congo (8 October 2025)
Tanzania	Novatus Miroshi	(yellow card) vs Niger (18 November 2023); (yellow card) (yellow-red card) vs Morocco (21 November 2023)	vs Zambia (11 June 2024)
Zambia	Kings Kangwa	(yellow card) vs Morocco (7 June 2024); (yellow card) vs Tanzania (11 June 2024)	vs Morocco (8 September 2025)
