= Waziri Shentembo =

Tanzanian footballer

Personal information
- Full name: Waziri Junior Shentembo
- Date of birth: 11 August 1996 (age 30)
- Place of birth: Nyamagana, Tanzania
- Height: 1.79 m (5 ft 10 in)
- Position: Forward

Team information
- Current team: Al-Minaa
- Number: 90

Senior career*
Years	Team	Apps	(Gls)
2016–2017	Toto African		(10)
2017–2018	Azam		
2018	→ Biashara United (loan)		
2018–2020	Mbao		(13)
2020–2021	Young Africans		
2021–2022	Dodoma Jiji		
2022–2025	Kinondoni		(14)
2025	Al-Minaa	6	(0)

International career^{‡}
2024–	Tanzania	4	(1)
- * Club domestic league appearances and goals as of 17 June 2025 ‡ National team caps and goals as of 6 February 2025

Waziri Junior Shentembo known as Waziri Shentembo (born 11 August 1996) is a Tanzanian professional footballer who plays as a forward for Iraq Stars League club Al-Minaa and Tanzania national team.

== Club career ==
Shentembo started playing with Toto African, and showed great performances, scoring 10 goals for the team in the 2016–17 season, but his team was relegated at the end of the season, and he moved to Azam. Shentembo had a tough season due to his recurring injuries, so he moved on loan to Biashara United Mara. When he returned to his team after the end of the loan, he could not keep up with the team,

On 1 August 2018, he moved to Mbao F.C., and scored 13 goals for the team. He signed with Young Africans for the 2020–21 season,

On 22 August 2021, he terminated his contract with Young Africans, then moved to Dodoma Jiji, then signed a contract with Kinondoni, and won the best player in Tanzanian Premier League for September 2023. He continued with the team for an additional year, scoring two goals against Geita Gold on 30 September 2024, and two goals against Simba in May 2024. He also scored a hat-trick against Tabora United on 10 March 2024, and was distinguished by the fact that all of his goals were scored without a penalty kick. At the end of the 2023–24 season, Shentembo was in the best squad in the Tanzania Mainland Premier League, scoring 12 goals for his team.

In January 2025, during the winter transfers, he moved to play in the Iraq Stars League, where he signed with Al-Minaa. His contract expired on 30 June 2025 and was not renewed with the club.

== International career ==
On 11 June 2024, Shentembo won his first international cap with Tanzania against Zambia in the 2026 FIFA World Cup qualification and scored his first goal in that match.

== Career statistics ==
As of match played 10 September 2024.

National team	Year	Apps	Goals
Tanzania	2024	4	1
Total		4	1

Scores and results list Tanzania's goal tally first, score column indicates score after each Shentembo goal.

List of international goals scored by Waziri Shentembo
No.	Date	Venue	Opponent	Score	Result	Competition
1	11 June 2024	Levy Mwanawasa Stadium, Ndola, Zambia	Zambia	1–0	1–0	2026 FIFA World Cup qualification

== Honours ==
Young Africans

- Tanzanian Premier League runners-up: 2020–21
