= Warsama Hassan =

Djiboutian footballer (born 1999)

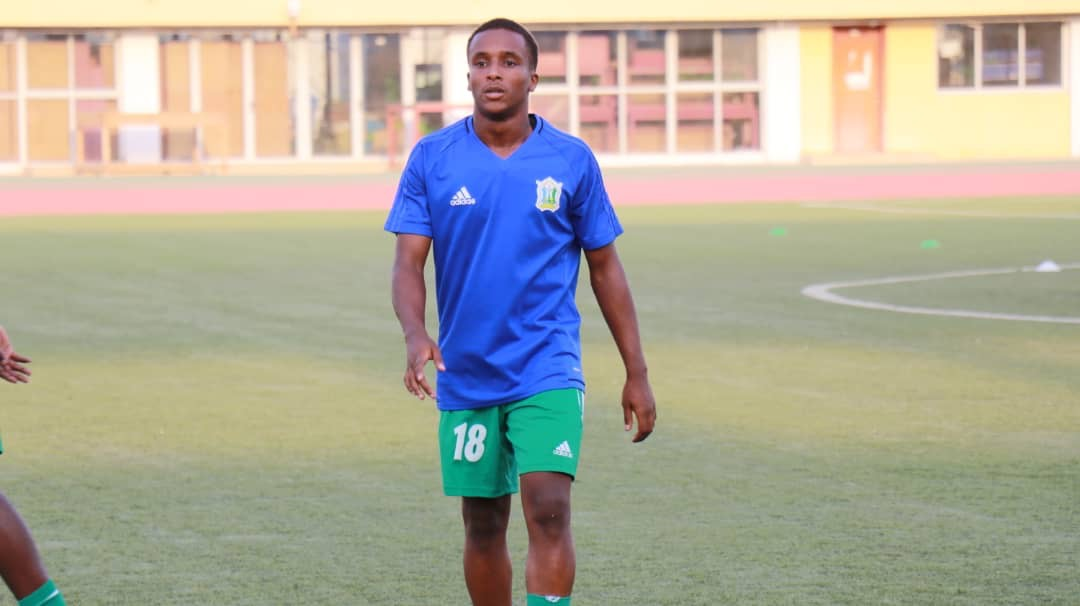

Personal information
- Full name: Warsama Hassan Houssein
- Date of birth: 17 March 1999 (age 27)
- Place of birth: Djibouti, Djibouti
- Height: 1.70 m (5 ft 7 in)
- Positions: Right-back; midfielder

Team information
- Current team: AP Brera Strumica
- Number: 14

Youth career
- 2007–2015: Standard Liège
- 2015–2019: Genk

Senior career*
Years	Team	Apps	(Gls)
2019–2020	Seraing	7	(0)
2020	Sereď	0	(0)
2021–2022	Sliema Wanderers	3	(0)
2022–2025	Arta/Solar7	5+	(1)
2025–	AP Brera Strumica	18	(0)

International career^{‡}
2014	Belgium U15	3	(0)
2016	Belgium U16	1	(0)
2019–	Djibouti	18	(2)
- * Club domestic league appearances and goals as of 25 May 2026 ‡ National team caps and goals as of 19:10, 10 February 2023 (UTC)

Warsama Hassan Houssein (born 17 March 1999) is a Djiboutian professional footballer who plays for AP Brera Strumica and the Djibouti national team.

== Club career ==
Born in Djibouti, Hassan joined the Standard Liège youth system in 2007. In 2015, he moved to Genk, playing in the club's academy for four years. On 2 January 2019, Hassan signed for Belgian First Amateur Division club Seraing on a two-year contract.

In October 2020 Hassan joined Sereď of the Slovak Fortuna Liga. With the move he became the first player from Djibouti to sign for a top-flight club in Europe. It was announced in August 2021 that Hassan had signed for Maltese Premier League club Sliema Wanderers on a one-year contract with a club option for an additional year.

== International career ==
Hassan previously represented Belgium at under-15 and under-16 levels. In 2014 he made three friendly appearances for the U15 side, two against Turkey and one against Italy. In April 2016 he made one under-17 appearance in a friendly against the Czech Republic. Hassan made his senior debut for Djibouti in a 2–1 FIFA World Cup qualification win against Eswatini on 4 September 2019.

== Career statistics ==
=== International goals ===
Scores and results list Djibouti's goal tally first.

No.	Date	Venue	Opponent	Score	Result	Competition
1.	6 September 2021	Prince Moulay Abdellah Stadium, Rabat, Morocco	Niger	2–4	2–4	2022 World Cup qualification
2.	26 August 2022	Marrakesh Stadium, Marrakesh, Morocco	Sudan	1–3	1–4	2022 African Nations Championship qualification
Last updated 30 August 2022

=== International career statistics ===
As of match played 2 September 2022.

Djibouti national team
Year	Apps	Goals
2019	8	0
2020	0	0
2021	6	1
2022	4	1
Total	18	2
