= 2022 FIFA World Cup qualification (CAF) =

Tournament details
- Dates: 4 September 2019 – 29 March 2022
- Teams: 54 (from 1 confederation)

Tournament statistics
- Matches played: 158
- Goals scored: 361 (2.28 per match)
- Attendance: 1,229,510 (7,782 per match)
- Top scorer(s): (Algeria) Islam Slimani (8 goals)

The African section of the 2022 FIFA World Cup qualification acted as qualifiers for the 2022 FIFA World Cup, held in Qatar, for national teams which were members of the Confederation of African Football (CAF). A total of five slots in the final tournament were available for CAF teams.

== Format ==
A previous proposal to merge the qualification rounds for the 2021 Africa Cup of Nations with those for the World Cup was turned down after a CAF meeting on 11 June 2018.

CAF reverted to the format used for the 2014 FIFA World Cup qualification competition.

- First round: 28 teams (ranked 27–54) played home-and-away over two legs. The 14 winners advanced to the second round.
- Second round: 40 teams (ranked 1–26 and 14 first round winners) were divided into ten groups of four teams to play home-and-away round-robin matches. The ten group winners advanced to the third round.
- Third round: Ten second round group winners played home-and-away over two legs. The five winners qualified for the World Cup.

== Entrants ==
All 54 FIFA-affiliated football associations from CAF entered qualification. The FIFA World Rankings of July 2019 were used to determine which nations would compete in the first round. For seeding in the second and third round draws, the most recent FIFA Rankings prior to those draws were used.

Libya was threatened with exclusion from the qualifiers if it failed to pay debts to their former coach Javier Clemente. However, Libya complied after FIFA gave them a new deadline. Sierra Leone also faced possible exclusion from the qualifiers due to the suspension of their football association. However, the suspension was lifted by the FIFA Council on 3 June 2019.

From the July 2019 FIFA World Rankings
Bye to the second round (ranked 1st to 26th)	Competing in first round (ranked 27th to 54th)
1. Senegal (20); 2. Tunisia (29); 3. Nigeria (33); 4. Algeria (40); 5. Morocco (41); 6. Egypt (46); 7. Ghana (50); 8. Cameroon (53); 9. DR Congo (56); 10. Ivory Coast (57); 11. Mali (59); 12. Burkina Faso (61); 13. South Africa (70); 14. Guinea (75); 15. Cape Verde (76); 16. Uganda (80); 17. Zambia (81); 18. Benin (82); 19. Gabon (90); 20. Congo (91); 21. Madagascar (96); 22. Niger (104); 23. Libya (105); 24. Mauritania (106); 25. Kenya (107); 26. Central African Republic (111)	27. Zimbabwe (112); 28. Sierra Leone (114); 29. Mozambique (116); 30. Namibia (121); 31. Angola (122); 32. Guinea-Bissau (123); 33. Malawi (126); 34. Togo (128); 35. Sudan (129); 36. Rwanda (133); 37. Tanzania (137); 38. Equatorial Guinea (139); 39. Eswatini (139); 40. Lesotho (144); 41. Comoros (146); 42. Botswana (147); 43. Burundi (148); 44. Ethiopia (150); 45. Liberia (152); 46. Mauritius (157); 47. Gambia (161); 48. South Sudan (169); 49. Chad (175); 50. São Tomé and Príncipe (185); 51. Seychelles (192); 52. Djibouti (195); 53. Somalia (202); 54. Eritrea (202)

== Schedule ==
Below is the schedule of the 2022 FIFA World Cup qualifying campaign, according to the FIFA International Match Calendar. After the rescheduling of the 2021 Africa Cup of Nations final tournament from June/July to January/February, the dates of the matchdays 1–2 of the second round were also rescheduled. Because of the interruption of the competition due to the COVID-19 pandemic, the schedule of the second and third round was revised again and on 19 August 2020 CAF announced the new dates for the aforementioned rounds.

Stage	Matchday	Dates
First round	First leg	4–7 September 2019
First round	Second leg	8–10 September 2019
Second round	Matchday 1	1–3 September 2021 (Note: Matchday 1 originally scheduled for 23–31 March 2020, later for 5–13 October 2020.)
Second round	Matchday 2	5–7 September 2021 (Note: Matchday 2 originally scheduled for 1–9 June 2020, later for 9–17 November 2020.)
Second round	Matchday 3	6–9 October 2021 (Note: Matchday 3 and 4 originally scheduled for 22–30 March 2021.)
Second round	Matchday 4	10–12 October 2021
Second round	Matchday 5	11–13 November 2021 (Note: Matchday 5 originally scheduled for 30 August – 7 September 2021.)
Second round	Matchday 6	14–16 November 2021 (Note: Matchday 6 originally scheduled for 4–12 October 2021.)
Third round	First leg	24–26 March 2022
Third round	Second leg	27–29 March 2022

== First round ==
The draw for the first round was held on 29 July 2019 at 12:00 EST (UTC+2), at the CAF headquarters in Cairo, Egypt.

Team 1	Agg.	Team 2	1st leg	2nd leg
Ethiopia	1–1 (a)	Lesotho	0–0	1–1
Somalia	2–3	Zimbabwe	1–0	1–3
Eritrea	1–4	Namibia	1–2	0–2
Burundi	2–2 (0–3 p)	Tanzania	1–1	1–1 (a.e.t.)
Djibouti	2–1	Eswatini	2–1	0–0
Botswana	0–1	Malawi	0–0	0–1
Gambia	1–3	Angola	0–1	1–2
Liberia	3–2	Sierra Leone	3–1	0–1
Mauritius	0–3	Mozambique	0–1	0–2
São Tomé and Príncipe	1–3	Guinea-Bissau	0–1	1–2
South Sudan	1–2	Equatorial Guinea	1–1	0–1
Comoros	1–3	Togo	1–1	0–2
Chad	1–3	Sudan	1–3	0–0
Seychelles	0–10	Rwanda	0–3	0–7

== Second round ==
The draw for the second round was held on 21 January 2020, 19:00 CAT (UTC+2), at the Ritz-Carlton hotel in Cairo, Egypt.

=== Group A ===
Pos	Team	Pld	W	D	L	GF	GA	GD	Pts	Qualification	Algeria	Burkina Faso	Niger	Djibouti
1	Algeria	6	4	2	0	25	4	+21	14	Advance to third round	—	2–2	6–1	8–0
2	Burkina Faso	6	3	3	0	12	4	+8	12		1–1	—	1–1	2–0
3	Niger	6	2	1	3	13	17	−4	7		0–4	0–2	—	7–2
4	Djibouti	6	0	0	6	4	29	−25	0		0–4	0–4	2–4	—

Source: FIFA, Soccerway
Rules for classification: Tiebreakers

=== Group B ===
Pos	Team	Pld	W	D	L	GF	GA	GD	Pts	Qualification	Tunisia	Equatorial Guinea	Zambia	Mauritania
1	Tunisia	6	4	1	1	11	2	+9	13	Advance to third round	—	3–0	3–1	3–0
2	Equatorial Guinea	6	3	2	1	6	5	+1	11		1–0	—	2–0	1–0
3	Zambia	6	2	1	3	8	9	−1	7		0–2	1–1	—	4–0
4	Mauritania	6	0	2	4	2	11	−9	2		0–0	1–1	1–2	—

Source: FIFA, Soccerway
Rules for classification: Tiebreakers

=== Group C ===
Pos	Team	Pld	W	D	L	GF	GA	GD	Pts	Qualification	Nigeria	Cape Verde	Liberia	Central African Republic
1	Nigeria	6	4	1	1	9	3	+6	13	Advance to third round	—	1–1	2–0	0–1
2	Cape Verde	6	3	2	1	8	6	+2	11		1–2	—	1–0	2–1
3	Liberia	6	2	0	4	5	8	−3	6		0–2	1–2	—	3–1
4	Central African Republic	6	1	1	4	4	9	−5	4		0–2	1–1	0–1	—

Source: FIFA, Soccerway
Rules for classification: Tiebreakers

=== Group D ===
Pos	Team	Pld	W	D	L	GF	GA	GD	Pts	Qualification	Cameroon	Côte d'Ivoire	Mozambique	Malawi
1	Cameroon	6	5	0	1	12	3	+9	15	Advance to third round	—	1–0	3–1	2–0
2	Ivory Coast	6	4	1	1	10	3	+7	13		2–1	—	3–0	2–1
3	Mozambique	6	1	1	4	2	8	−6	4		0–1	0–0	—	1–0
4	Malawi	6	1	0	5	2	12	−10	3		0–4	0–3	1–0	—

Source: FIFA, Soccerway
Rules for classification: Tiebreakers

=== Group E ===
Pos	Team	Pld	W	D	L	GF	GA	GD	Pts	Qualification	Mali	Uganda	Kenya	Rwanda
1	Mali	6	5	1	0	11	0	+11	16	Advance to third round	—	1–0	5–0	1–0
2	Uganda	6	2	3	1	3	2	+1	9		0–0	—	1–1	1–0
3	Kenya	6	1	3	2	4	9	−5	6		0–1	0–0	—	2–1
4	Rwanda	6	0	1	5	2	9	−7	1		0–3	0–1	1–1	—

Source: FIFA, Soccerway
Rules for classification: Tiebreakers

=== Group F ===
Pos	Team	Pld	W	D	L	GF	GA	GD	Pts	Qualification	Egypt	Gabon	Libya	Angola
1	Egypt	6	4	2	0	10	4	+6	14	Advance to third round	—	2–1	1–0	1–0
2	Gabon	6	2	1	3	7	8	−1	7		1–1	—	1–0	2–0
3	Libya	6	2	1	3	4	7	−3	7		0–3	2–1	—	1–1
4	Angola	6	1	2	3	6	8	−2	5		2–2	3–1	0–1	—

Source: FIFA, Soccerway
Rules for classification: Tiebreakers

=== Group G ===
Pos	Team	Pld	W	D	L	GF	GA	GD	Pts	Qualification	Ghana	South Africa	Ethiopia	Zimbabwe
1	Ghana	6	4	1	1	7	3	+4	13	Advance to third round	—	1–0	1–0	3–1
2	South Africa	6	4	1	1	6	2	+4	13		1–0	—	1–0	1–0
3	Ethiopia	6	1	2	3	4	7	−3	5		1–1	1–3	—	1–0
4	Zimbabwe	6	0	2	4	2	7	−5	2		0–1	0–0	1–1	—

Source: FIFA, Soccerway
Rules for classification: Tiebreakers

=== Group H ===
Pos	Team	Pld	W	D	L	GF	GA	GD	Pts	Qualification	Senegal	Togo	Namibia	Republic of the Congo
1	Senegal	6	5	1	0	15	4	+11	16	Advance to third round	—	2–0	4–1	2–0
2	Togo	6	2	2	2	5	6	−1	8		1–1	—	0–1	1–1
3	Namibia	6	1	2	3	5	10	−5	5		1–3	0–1	—	1–1
4	Congo	6	0	3	3	5	10	−5	3		1–3	1–2	1–1	—

Source: FIFA, Soccerway
Rules for classification: Tiebreakers

=== Group I ===
Pos	Team	Pld	W	D	L	GF	GA	GD	Pts	Qualification	Morocco	Guinea-Bissau	Guinea	Sudan
1	Morocco	6	6	0	0	20	1	+19	18	Advance to third round	—	5–0	3–0	2–0
2	Guinea-Bissau	6	1	3	2	5	11	−6	6		0–3	—	1–1	0–0
3	Guinea	6	0	4	2	5	11	−6	4		1–4	0–0	—	2–2
4	Sudan	6	0	3	3	5	12	−7	3		0–3	2–4	1–1	—

Source: FIFA, Soccerway
Rules for classification: Tiebreakers

=== Group J ===
Pos	Team	Pld	W	D	L	GF	GA	GD	Pts	Qualification	Democratic Republic of the Congo	Benin	Tanzania	Madagascar
1	DR Congo	6	3	2	1	9	3	+6	11	Advance to third round	—	2–0	1–1	2–0
2	Benin	6	3	1	2	5	4	+1	10		1–1	—	0–1	2–0
3	Tanzania	6	2	2	2	6	8	−2	8		0–3	0–1	—	3–2
4	Madagascar	6	1	1	4	4	9	−5	4		1–0	0–1	1–1	—

Source: FIFA, Soccerway
Rules for classification: Tiebreakers

== Third round ==
The ten group winners from the second round were drawn into five home-and-away ties, with the teams seeded based on FIFA World Rankings. The draw was held on 22 January 2022 in Douala, Cameroon. The lower ranked team played the first leg at home. The winners of each fixture qualified for the 2022 FIFA World Cup.

Team 1	Agg.	Team 2	1st leg	2nd leg
Egypt	1–1 (1–3 p)	Senegal	1–0	0–1 (a.e.t.)
Cameroon	2–2 (a)	Algeria	0–1	2–1 (a.e.t.)
Ghana	1–1 (a)	Nigeria	0–0	1–1
DR Congo	2–5	Morocco	1–1	1–4
Mali	0–1	Tunisia	0–1	0–0

== Qualified teams ==
Status of CAF countries with respect to the 2022 FIFA World Cup: Team has qualified for World Cup Team failed to qualify Team suspended Country not a CAF member

The following five teams from CAF qualified for the final tournament.

Team	Qualified as	Qualified on	Previous appearances in FIFA World Cup
Ghana	Third round winners	29 March 2022	3 (2006, 2010, 2014)
Senegal	Third round winners	29 March 2022	2 (2002, 2018)
Tunisia	Third round winners	29 March 2022	5 (1978, 1998, 2002, 2006, 2018)
Morocco	Third round winners	29 March 2022	5 (1970, 1986, 1994, 1998, 2018)
Cameroon	Third round winners	29 March 2022	7 (1982, 1990, 1994, 1998, 2002, 2010, 2014)

== Top goalscorers ==
There were 362 goals scored in 158 matches, for an average of 2.29 goals per match.

8 goals

- (Algeria national football team) Islam Slimani

5 goals

- (Algeria national football team) Riyad Mahrez
- (Mali national football team) Ibrahima Koné
- (Morocco national football team) Ayoub El Kaabi
- (Niger national football team) Victorien Adebayor
- (Zambia national football team) Fashion Sakala

4 goals

- (Burkina Faso national football team) Abdoul Tapsoba
- (DR Congo national football team) Dieumerci Mbokani
- (Guinea-Bissau national football team) Joseph Mendes
- (Morocco national football team) Ryan Mmaee
- (Namibia national football team) Peter Shalulile
- (Nigeria national football team) Victor Osimhen
- (Senegal national football team) Famara Diédhiou
- (Tanzania national football team) Saimon Msuva

Below are full goalscorer lists for each round:

- First round
- Second round
- Third round
