= Amadou Sabo =

Nigerien footballer (born 2000)

Personal information
- Full name: Mahamadou Amadou Sabo
- Date of birth: 30 May 2000 (age 26)
- Place of birth: Oumba, Niger
- Height: 1.76 m (5 ft 9 in)
- Position: Midfielder

Team information
- Current team: FK Sūduva
- Number: 6

Youth career
- –2020: AS SONIDEP

Senior career*
Years	Team	Apps	(Gls)
2020–2021	CA Bizertin	22	(5)
2021–2023	Club Africain	27	(0)
2025–	FK Sūduva	42	(4)

International career^{‡}
2019	Niger U20	3	(1)
2021–	Niger	20	(3)
- * Club domestic league appearances and goals as of 7 September 2026 ‡ National team caps and goals as of 16 March 2025

Mahamadou Amadou Sabo (born 30 May 2000) is a Nigerien professional footballer who plays as a midfielder for A lyga club FK Sūduva and the Niger national football team.

== Career ==
=== FK Sūduva ===
28 February 2025 Amadou Sabo signed with Lithuanian Sūduva Club.

== International career ==
He was first called up to the Niger national football team in November 2019, but remained on the bench. He made his debut for the squad on 5 June 2021 in a friendly against The Gambia. In June 2022, Sabo scored another goal during a 1 to 1 tie with Uganda.

== Career statistics ==
=== Club ===
As of 3 January 2023.

Club	Season	League			Cup		Continental		Other		Total	
Club	Season	Division	Apps	Goals	Apps	Goals	Apps	Goals	Apps	Goals	Apps	Goals
Bizertin	2020–21	CLP-1	22	5	0	0	0	0	0	0	22	5
Club Africain	2021–22	CLP-1	17	0	0	0	0	0	0	0	17	0
Club Africain	2022–23	CLP-1	6	0	0	0	2	0	0	0	8	0
Career total			45	5	0	0	2	0	0	0	47	5

=== International ===
As of matches played 30 September 2022.

Appearances and goals by national team and year
National team	Year	Apps	Goals
Niger	2022	14	2
Total		14	2

As of 3 January 2023. Scores and results list Niger's goal tally first, score column indicates score after each Sabo goal.

List of international goals scored by Amadou Sabo
No.	Date	Venue	Opponent	Score	Result	Competition
1	6 September 2021	Prince Moulay Abdellah Stadium, Rabat, Morocco	Djibouti	4–1	4–2	2022 FIFA World Cup qualification
2	8 June 2022	St. Mary's Stadium-Kitende, Entebbe, Uganda	Uganda	1–1	1–1	2023 Africa Cup of Nations qualification
