= 2021 Africa Cup of Nations qualification Group K =

Football tournament qualifying stage

Group K of the 2021 Africa Cup of Nations qualification tournament was one of the twelve groups that decided the teams which qualified for the 2021 Africa Cup of Nations finals tournament. The group consisted of four teams: Ivory Coast, Niger, Madagascar, and Ethiopia.

The teams played against each other in home-and-away round-robin format, originally scheduled between November 2019 and September 2020.

Due to the COVID-19 pandemic, all matches of matchdays 3 and 4 scheduled for March 2020 were postponed until further notice. FIFA recommended that all June 2020 international matches (matchday 5) be postponed, and also postponed the September 2020 window (matchday 6) for CAF.

On 30 June 2020, the CAF announced the 2021 Africa Cup of Nations final tournament had been postponed from January 2021 to January 2022, without announcing the new dates of the remaining qualifiers. On 19 August 2020, the CAF announced the new dates of the remaining qualifiers, with matchdays 3 and 4 rescheduled to be played between 9–17 November 2020, and matchdays 5 and 6 rescheduled to be played between 22 and 30 March 2021.

Ivory Coast and Ethiopia, the group winners and runners-up respectively, qualified for the 2021 Africa Cup of Nations.

== Standings ==
Pos	Team	Pld	W	D	L	GF	GA	GD	Pts	Qualification	Côte d'Ivoire	Ethiopia	Madagascar	Niger
1	Ivory Coast	6	4	1	1	11	5	+6	13	Final tournament	—	3–1	2–1	1–0
2	Ethiopia	6	3	0	3	10	6	+4	9	Final tournament	2–1	—	4–0	3–0
3	Madagascar	6	2	2	2	9	9	0	8		1–1	1–0	—	0–0
4	Niger	6	1	1	4	3	13	−10	4		0–3	1–0	2–6	—

Source: CAF
Rules for classification: Tiebreakers

== Matches ==
16 November 2019
16:00 UTC+3

Madagascar	1–0	Ethiopia
Raveloson 18'	Report

Mahamasina Municipal Stadium, Antananarivo
Referee: Sekou Ahmed Touré (Guinea)
16 November 2019
19:00 UTC+0

Ivory Coast	1–0	Niger
Kessié 68' (pen.)	Report

Stade Félix Houphouët-Boigny, Abidjan
Referee: Joao Goma (Angola)

19 November 2019
16:00 UTC+3

Ethiopia	2–1	Ivory Coast
Dagnachew 16'; Bekele 26'	Report	Aurier 4'

Bahir Dar Stadium, Bahir Dar
Referee: Celso Alvação (Mozambique)
19 November 2019
17:00 UTC+1

Niger	2–6	Madagascar
Wonkoye 6'; Moussa 77'	Report	Nomenjanahary 10', 27'; Anicet 35' (pen.); Andriamatsinoro 38'; Voavy 54'; Morel 65'

Stade Général Seyni Kountché, Niamey
Referee: Janny Sikazwe (Zambia)

12 November 2020
19:00 UTC+0

Ivory Coast	2–1	Madagascar
Gervinho 48'; Haller 55'	Report	Voavy 59'

Stade Olympique Alassane Ouattara, Abidjan
Referee: Haythem Guirat (Tunisia)
13 November 2020
17:00 UTC+1

Niger	1–0	Ethiopia
Oumarou 73'	Report

Stade Général Seyni Kountché, Niamey
Referee: Hassen Corneh (Liberia)

17 November 2020
16:00 UTC+3

Madagascar	1–1	Ivory Coast
Amada 51'	Report	Kessié 15' (pen.)

Barikadimy Stadium, Toamasina
Referee: Gehad Grisha (Egypt)
17 November 2020
16:00 UTC+3

Ethiopia	3–0	Niger
Gebremichael 13'; Mohammed 43'; Kebede 70'	Report

Bahir Dar Stadium, Bahir Dar
Referee: Daudu Williams (Sierra Leone)

24 March 2021
16:00 UTC+3

Ethiopia	4–0	Madagascar
Gebremichael 19'; Kebede 34'; Nassir 41'; Bekele 86'	Report

Bahir Dar Stadium, Bahir Dar
Referee: Sidi Alioum (Cameroon)
26 March 2021
16:00 UTC+0

Niger	0–3	Ivory Coast
	Report	Aurier 25'; Gradel 34'; Kanon 60'

Stade Général Seyni Kountché, Niamey
Referee: Beida Dahane (Mauritania)

30 March 2021
13:00 UTC+0

Ivory Coast	3–1	Ethiopia
Boly 3'; Kessié 19' (pen.); Kouassi 76'	Report	Kebede 74'

Stade Olympique Alassane Ouattara, Abidjan
Referee: Charles Bulu (Ghana)
30 March 2021
16:00 UTC+3

Madagascar	0–0	Niger
	Report

Barikadimy Stadium, Toamasina
Referee: Eric Otogo-Castane (Gabon)

== Goalscorers ==
There were 33 goals scored in 12 matches, for an average of 2.75 goals per match.

3 goals

- (Ethiopia) Getaneh Kebede
- (Ivory Coast) Franck Kessié

2 goals

- (Ethiopia) Shimelis Bekele
- (Ethiopia) Amanuel Gebremichael
- (Ivory Coast) Serge Aurier
- (Madagascar) Lalaïna Nomenjanahary
- (Madagascar) Paulin Voavy

1 goal

- (Ethiopia) Surafel Dagnachew
- (Ethiopia) Mesud Mohammed
- (Ethiopia) Abubeker Nassir
- (Ivory Coast) Willy Boly
- (Ivory Coast) Gervinho
- (Ivory Coast) Max Gradel
- (Ivory Coast) Sébastien Haller
- (Ivory Coast) Wilfried Kanon
- (Ivory Coast) Jean Evrard Kouassi
- (Madagascar) Anicet Abel
- (Madagascar) Ibrahim Amada
- (Madagascar) Carolus Andriamatsinoro
- (Madagascar) Jérémy Morel
- (Madagascar) Rayan Raveloson
- (Niger) Yussif Moussa
- (Niger) Youssef Oumarou
- (Niger) Amadou Wonkoye
