= Daniel Sosah =

Nigerien footballer

Personal information
- Date of birth: 21 September 1998 (age 28)
- Place of birth: Accra, Ghana
- Height: 1.79 m (5 ft 10 in)
- Position: Forward

Team information
- Current team: Aktobe
- Number: 7

Youth career
- –2016: Noble Arrics
- 2016–2017: Maccabi Netanya
- 2017: Beitar Nes Tubruk

Senior career*
Years	Team	Apps	(Gls)
2017–2018	AS FAN		
2018–2020	CI Kamsar		
2021–2022	Isloch Minsk Raion	43	(15)
2023–2025	Kryvbas Kryvyi Rih	47	(5)
2025–	Aktobe	32	(10)

International career^{‡}
2021–	Niger	35	(16)
- * Club domestic league appearances and goals as of 1 November 2026 ‡ National team caps and goals as of 25 September 2026

Daniel Sosah (born 21 September 1998) is a professional footballer who plays for Kazakh club Aktobe. Born in Ghana, he plays for the Niger national team.

== International career ==
Sosah was born in Ghana to a Beninese father and Ghanaian mother, and began his career in Niger where he was naturalized. He debuted for the Niger national team in a 6–1 2022 FIFA World Cup qualification loss to Algeria on 8 October 2021, where he scored his side's only goal.

=== International goals ===
Scores and results list Niger's goal tally first.

No	Date	Venue	Opponent	Score	Result	Competition
1.	8 October 2021	Mustapha Tchaker Stadium, Blida, Algeria	Algeria	1–2	1–6	2022 FIFA World Cup qualification
2.	15 November 2021	Stade Général Seyni Kountché, Niamey, Niger	Djibouti	4–1	7–2	2022 FIFA World Cup qualification
3.	4 June 2022	L'Amitié Stadium, Cotonou, Benin	Tanzania	1–1	1–1	2023 Africa Cup of Nations qualification
4.	23 March 2023	Nelson Mandela Stadium, Baraki, Algeria	Algeria	1–0	1–2	2023 Africa Cup of Nations qualification
5.	22 March 2024	El Bachir Stadium, Mohammedia, Morocco	Togo	1–0	1–2	Friendly
6.	26 March 2024	Berrechid Municipal Stadium, Berrechid, Morocco	Burkina Faso	1–1	1–1	Friendly
7.	14 November 2024	Kégué Stadium, Lomé, Togo	Sudan	1–0	4–0	2025 Africa Cup of Nations qualification
8.	14 November 2024	Kégué Stadium, Lomé, Togo	Sudan	3–0	4–0	2025 Africa Cup of Nations qualification
9.	25 March 2025	Père Jégo Stadium, Casablanca, Morocco	Bonaire	4–0	6–0	Friendly
10.	25 March 2025	Père Jégo Stadium, Casablanca, Morocco	Bonaire	5–0	6–0	Friendly
11.	6 June 2025	Père Jégo Stadium, Casablanca, Morocco	Gabon	1–0	4–3	Friendly
12.	9 September 2025	Amaan Stadium, Zanzibar City, Tanzania	Tanzania	1–0	1–0	2026 FIFA World Cup qualification
13.	8 October 2025	4 August Stadium, Ouagadougou, Burkina Faso	Congo	1–0	3–1	2026 FIFA World Cup qualification
14.	12 October 2025	Levy Mwanawasa Stadium, Ndola, Zambia	Zambia	1–0	1–0	2026 FIFA World Cup qualification
15.	14 November 2025	El Bachir Stadium, Mohammedia, Morocco	Burkina Faso	2–2	2–3	Friendly
16.	25 September 2026	Accra Sports Stadium, Accra, Ghana	Lesotho	1–0	2–1	2027 Africa Cup of Nations qualification
