= Déo Bassinga =

Congolese footballer (born 2005)

Personal information
- Full name: Déogracias Maurile Gloire Bassinga
- Date of birth: 11 August 2005 (age 21)
- Position: Forward

Team information
- Current team: Dila Gori
- Number: 28

Youth career
- CSMD Diables Noirs

Senior career*
Years	Team	Apps	(Gls)
2021–2023	CSMD Diables Noirs		
2023–2024	Jong KAA Gent	12	(0)
2024–	Dila Gori	38	(5)

International career^{‡}
2023–	Congo U20	4	(4)
2022–	Congo	9	(1)
- * Club domestic league appearances and goals as of 10 December 2025 ‡ National team caps and goals as of 11 August 2026

Déogracias Maurile Gloire Bassinga (born 11 August 2005) is a Congolese professional footballer who plays as a forward for Dila Gori.

== International career ==
=== Youth ===
Bassinga played at the 2023 Africa U-20 Cup of Nations, where he scored four goals, including a hat trick in the quarter-final game against Tunisia.

=== Senior ===
Bassinga represented the Congo at the 2022 African Nations Championship, having a goal ruled out by VAR against Niger.

== Career statistics ==
=== International ===
As of match played 14 October 2025

Appearances and goals by national team and year
National team	Year	Apps	Goals
Congo	2022	2	0
Congo	2023	4	0
Congo	2025	2	1
Total		9	1

Scores and results list Congo's goal tally first, score column indicates score after each Bassinga goal.

List of international goals scored by Déo Bassinga
No.	Date	Venue	Opponent	Score	Result	Competition
1	8 October 2025	Stade du 4 Août, Ouagadougou, Burkina Faso	Niger	1–3	1–3	2026 FIFA World Cup qualification
