= Youssouf Abdi Ahmed =

Djiboutian footballer (born 1997)

Personal information
- Date of birth: 11 October 1997 (age 29)
- Place of birth: Djibouti
- Position: Midfielder

Team information
- Current team: ASAS Djibouti Télécom
- Number: 10

Senior career*
Years	Team	Apps	(Gls)
2018–2021	AS Espérance Sportive		
2021–	ASAS Djibouti Télécom		

International career
2019–	Djibouti	7	(1)
- * Club domestic league appearances and goals

Youssouf Abdi Ahmed (born 11 October 1997) is a Djiboutian professional footballer who plays for the Djibouti national team.

He made his international debut on 4 September 2019 at the 2022 FIFA World Cup qualifying match against Eswatini in a 2-1 victory.

On 15 November 2021, Ahmed scored his first goal for Djibouti against Niger at the 2022 FIFA World Cup qualifying match in a 7-2 defeat.

== International goals ==
No.	Date	Venue	Opponent	Score	Result	Competition
1.	15 November 2021	Stade Général Seyni Kountché, Niamey, Niger	Niger	1–1	2–7	2022 FIFA World Cup qualification
