= Yabe Siad Isman =

Djiboutian footballer (born 1998)

Personal information
- Full name: Yabe Siad Isman
- Date of birth: 12 March 1998 (age 28)
- Height: 1.75 m (5 ft 9 in)
- Position: Defender

Team information
- Current team: Arta/Solar7
- Number: 12

Senior career*
Years	Team	Apps	(Gls)
2018–	Arta/Solar7		

International career^{‡}
2019–	Djibouti	19	(1)
- * Club domestic league appearances and goals ‡ National team caps and goals as of 9 February 2023

Yabe Siad Isman (born 12 March 1998) is a Djiboutian footballer who plays as a defender for Djiboutian club Arta/Solar7 and the Djibouti national team.

== International goals ==
No.	Date	Venue	Opponent	Score	Result	Competition
1.	15 November 2021	Stade Général Seyni Kountché, Niamey, Niger	Niger	2–5	2–7	2022 FIFA World Cup qualification
