= Anas Farah Ali =

Djiboutian footballer (born 2000)

Personal information
- Date of birth: 3 March 2000 (age 26)
- Place of birth: Norway
- Height: 1.79 m (5 ft 10 in)
- Position: Midfielder

Team information
- Current team: Moss
- Number: 7

Youth career
- 2012: Trosvik
- 2013: Selbak
- 2014–2015: Fredrikstad

Senior career*
Years	Team	Apps	(Gls)
2015–2021	Fredrikstad	40	(6)
2019	→ Grorud (loan)	2	(0)
2021	→ Egersund (loan)	4	(0)
2022–	Moss	45	(10)

International career^{‡}
2015	Norway U15	2	(1)
2015–2016	Norway U16	17	(4)
2017	Norway U17	3	(1)
2018	Norway U18	3	(0)
2021–	Djibouti	3	(1)
- * Club domestic league appearances and goals as of 13 June 2024 ‡ National team caps and goals as of 27 November 2021

Anas Farah Ali (born 3 March 2000) is a professional footballer who plays as a midfielder for Norwegian First Division club Moss. Born in Norway, he plays for the Djibouti national team.

== Club career ==
As a youth Ali played for Trosvik IF and Selbak TIF. He later joined the academy of Fredrikstad FK and was promoted to the senior squad in 2015. He was subsequently sent out on loan to Grorud IL in 2019 and Egersunds IK in 2021.

== International career ==
Ali represented Norway in 2017 UEFA European Under-17 Championship qualification, appearing in three matches. He has represented Norway from under-15 to under-18 level.

In August 2021 it was announced that Ali had been called up to represent Djibouti in 2022 World Cup qualification matches against Algeria and Niger the following month. He debuted with Djibouti in a 4–2 loss to Niger on 6 September 2021, scoring the first goal in the game in the 32nd minute.

=== International goals ===
Scores and results list Djibouti's goal tally first.

No.	Date	Venue	Opponent	Score	Result	Competition
1.	6 September 2021	Prince Moulay Abdellah Stadium, Rabat, Morocco	Niger	1–0	2–4	2022 World Cup qualification
Last updated 6 September 2021

=== International career statistics ===
As of match played 6 September 2021.

Djibouti national team
Year	Apps	Goals
2021	1	1
Total	1	1
