= Mohamed Wonkoye =

Nigerian footballer

Personal information
- Full name: Mohamed Amadou Djibo Wonkoye
- Date of birth: 19 May 1994 (age 32)
- Place of birth: Niamey, Niger
- Height: 1.75 m (5 ft 9 in)
- Position: Winger

Team information
- Current team: Horoya

Youth career
- WAFA

Senior career*
| Years | Team | Apps | (Gls) |
- ASEC
| 2015 | Braga B | 0 | (0) |
| 2017– | Horoya | | |

International career
| 2012–2023 | Niger | 43 | (5) |
- * Club domestic league appearances and goals

Mohamed Amadou Djibo Wonkoye (born 19 May 1994) is a Nigerien footballer who plays as a winger for Horoya. He made 43 appearances for the Niger national team, scoring five goals.

== Career ==
As a youth player, Wonkoye joined the youth academy of Ghanaian side WAFA. After that, he signed for ASEC in Ivory Coast.

Before the second half of 2014–15, he signed for Portuguese second division club Braga B.

In 2017, Wonkoye signed for Horoya in Guinea.

== Career statistics ==
As of match played 14 October 2023

Appearances and goals by national team and year
| National team | Year | Apps | Goals |
|---|---|---|---|
| Niger | 2012 | 2 | 0 |
| Niger | 2013 | 1 | 0 |
| Niger | 2015 | 9 | 1 |
| Niger | 2016 | 2 | 0 |
| Niger | 2017 | 1 | 0 |
| Niger | 2018 | 6 | 1 |
| Niger | 2019 | 6 | 1 |
| Niger | 2020 | 2 | 0 |
| Niger | 2021 | 11 | 2 |
| Niger | 2022 | 5 | 0 |
| Niger | 2023 | 3 | 1 |
| Total | | 49 | 6 |

Scores and results list Niger's goal tally first, score column indicates score after each Wonkoye goal.

List of international goals scored by Mohamed Wonkoye
| No. | Date | Venue | Opponent | Score | Result | Competition |
|---|---|---|---|---|---|---|
| 1 | 6 June 2015 | Stade Général Seyni Kountché, Niamey, Niger | Gabon | 1–0 | 2–1 | Friendly |
| 2 | 27 May 2018 | Stade Général Seyni Kountché, Niamey, Niger | Central African Republic | 2–2 | 3–3 | Friendly |
| 3 | 19 November 2019 | Stade Général Seyni Kountché, Niamey, Niger | Madagascar | 1–0 | 2–6 | 2021 Africa Cup of Nations qualification |
| 4 | 6 September 2021 | Prince Moulay Abdellah Stadium, Rabat, Morocco | Djibouti | 3–1 | 4–2 | 2022 FIFA World Cup qualification |
| 5 | 15 November 2021 | Stade Général Seyni Kountché, Niamey, Niger | Djibouti | 3–1 | 7–2 | 2022 FIFA World Cup qualification |
| 6 | 14 October 2023 | Berrechid Municipal Stadium, Berrechid, Morocco | Somalia | 2–0 | 3–0 | Friendly |

As of match played 14 October 2023
