= Azzedine Ounahi =

Moroccan footballer (born 2000)

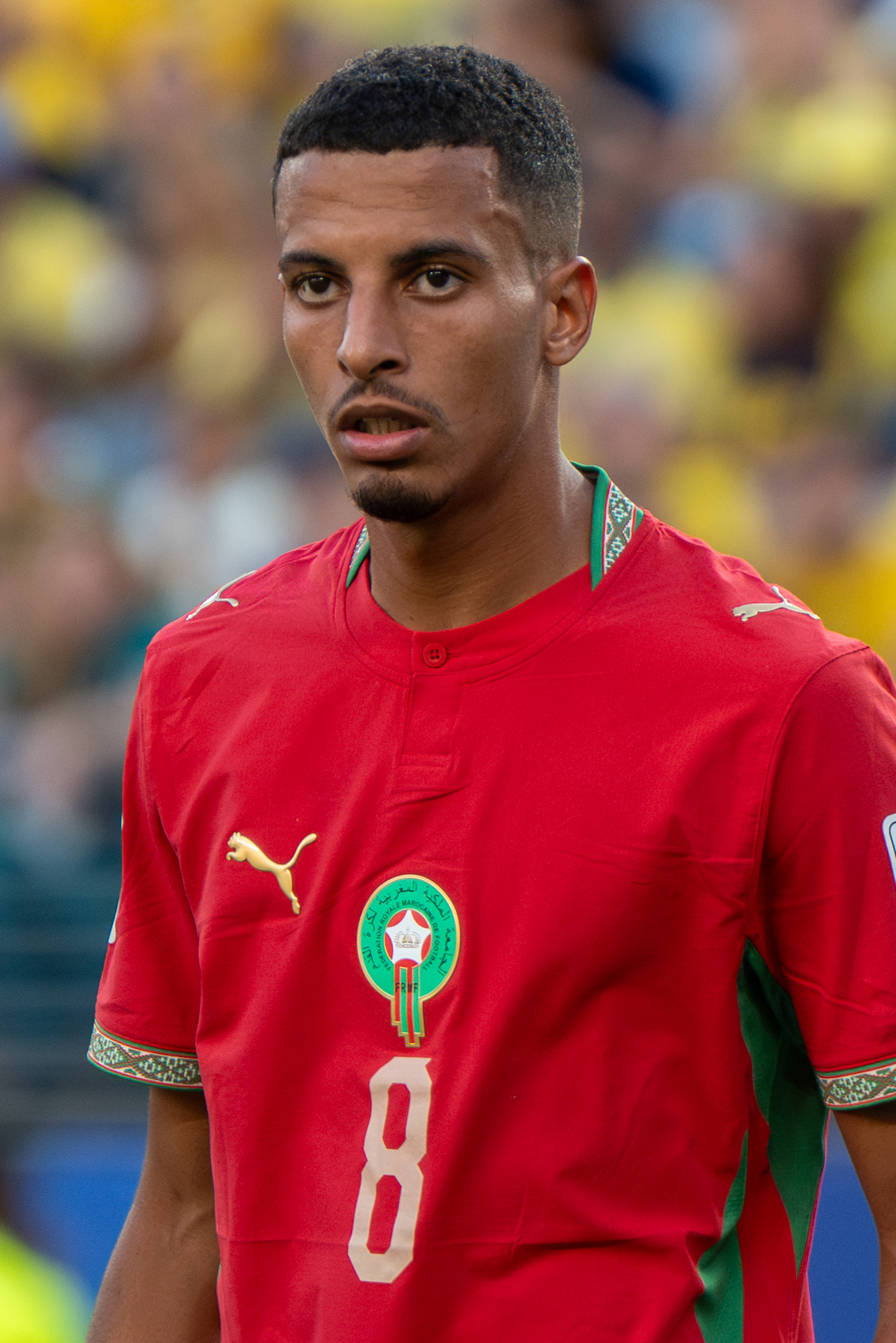
- Ounahi with Morocco in 2026

Personal information
- Full name: Azzedine Ounahi
- Date of birth: 19 April 2000 (age 26)
- Place of birth: Casablanca, Morocco
- Height: 1.82 m (6 ft 0 in)
- Position: Midfielder

Team information
- Current team: Panathinaikos
- Number: 21

Youth career
- 2010–2015: Raja CA
- 2015–2018: Mohammed VI Academy

Senior career*
Years	Team	Apps	(Gls)
2018–2020	Strasbourg B	35	(1)
2020	Avranches B	2	(1)
2020–2021	Avranches	27	(5)
2021–2023	Angers	47	(2)
2023–2025	Marseille	28	(3)
2024–2025	→ Panathinaikos (loan)	25	(5)
2025–2026	Girona	24	(5)
2026–	Panathinaikos	6	(1)

International career^{‡}
2018	Morocco U20	2	(1)
2022–	Morocco	58	(12)
Medal record
Men's football
Representing Morocco
Africa Cup of Nations
Winner	2025 Morocco
Mediterranean Games
Bronze medal – third place	2018 Tarragona	Team
- * Club domestic league appearances and goals as of 18 October 2026 ‡ National team caps and goals as of 4 October 2026

Azzedine Ounahi (Arabic: عز الدين أوناحي, romanized: ʿIzz al-Dīn Ūnāḥī, pronounced [ʕiz ʔad.di:n u:na:ħi:]; born 19 April 2000) is a Moroccan professional footballer who plays as a midfielder for Super League Greece club Panathinaikos and the Morocco national team.

Ounahi made his international debut in 2022, after previously being capped by the nation's youth teams at under-20 level. He was chosen in Morocco's squad for the FIFA World Cup in 2022 and 2026. He was also picked for the Africa Cup of Nations in 2021, 2023 and 2025.

== Club career ==
=== Early career ===
A former player of Raja CA and Mohammed VI Academy, Ounahi joined RC Strasbourg in 2018. In August 2020, he moved to Championnat National club Avranches.

=== Angers ===
On 14 July 2021, Ligue 1 club Angers announced the signing of Ounahi on a four-year deal. He made his professional debut on 15 August 2021 by scoring a goal in club's 3–0 league win against Lyon.

=== Marseille ===
After attracting the interest of several top-tier clubs across Europe, thanks to his breakthrough performances for Morocco at the 2022 FIFA World Cup, on 29 January 2023 Ounahi officially joined fellow Ligue 1 side Marseille for an estimated fee of 8 million euros plus add-ons, signing a contract until June 2027. On 1 February 2023, he scored his first goal for Marseille on his debut against Nantes. On 1 November 2023, Ounahi was nominated for the 2023 African Footballer of the Year by CAF.

==== Loan to Panathinaikos ====
On 4 September 2024, Ounahi joined Greek club Panathinaikos on an initial season-long loan with an option to buy.

=== Girona ===
On 30 August 2025, Ounahi signed with Girona on a contract lasting until 2030. He scored his first La Liga goal in a 1–1 away draw with Athletic Bilbao.

=== Return to Panathinaikos ===
On 2 September 2026, Ounahi rejoined Greek side Panathinaikos, signing a four-year contract. On 18 October 2026, during a home 5–1 victory against Asteras Tripolis for the 2026–27 Super League Greece season, he suffered a what was thought to be a third degree strained muscle injury which was initially estimated to keep him out of action until late January 2027. However, on 27 October an additional MRI scan showed a complete tear of his biceps femoris tendon on his right leg for which it was decided he will undergo surgery to minimize risks of relapse increasing his absence for up to six months (until April, when the championship playoffs begin).

== International career ==
=== Youth ===
Ounahi was called up for Morocco U20 to participate in the 2018 Mediterranean Games. On 22 June 2018, he scored a goal at the 68th minute in a tie against Italy. He later went on to win the bronze medal with the team after a victory in the penalty shoot-out against Greece.

=== Senior ===
On 23 December 2021, Vahid Halilhodžić gave Ounahi his first call-up to the Moroccan senior national team for the 2021 Africa Cup of Nations. Ounahi made his professional debut for Morocco in the 2021 African Cup of Nations in a 1–0 victory against Ghana on 10 January 2022. In his fourth match with Morocco, he managed to score a double in a 4–1 victory against DR Congo in the 2022 FIFA World Cup qualification – CAF third round, which marked his first goal with the national team.

On 10 November 2022, he was named in Morocco's 26-man squad for the 2022 FIFA World Cup in Qatar. After an impressive performance in the round of 16 game against Spain, which Morocco won on penalties, Spanish manager Luis Enrique commented on Ounahi's performance: "My God, where does this guy come from? I was pleasantly surprised by their number eight. I don't remember his name, I'm sorry…". In the quarter-final match against Portugal, which Morocco won 1–0, no Moroccan player had more dribbles (three) or won more duels (seven) than Ounahi. Morocco went on to finish fourth in the tournament. During a friendly match against Brazil, which resulted in a 2–1 victory, Ounahi picked up an injury after suffering a fracture in his right toe, that required him to undergo surgery, which resulted in an end of his football season.

On 17 January 2024, Ounahi scored a goal in a 3–0 victory against Tanzania, marking his first ever goal in the Africa Cup of Nations. On 11 December 2025, Ounahi was called up to the Morocco squad for the 2025 Africa Cup of Nations.

On 26 May 2026, Ounahi was selected in the 26-man squad for the 2026 FIFA World Cup. In the round of 16 game against Canada, he scored the first two goals in a 3–0 victory as his team progressed to the quarterfinals.

== Personal life ==
Ounahi considers Andrés Iniesta his footballing role model. Ounahi is the cousin of footballer Reda Mhannaoui.

== Career statistics ==
=== Club ===
As of match played 18 October 2026

Appearances and goals by club, season and competition
Club	Season	League			National cup		Europe		Total	
Club	Season	Division	Apps	Goals	Apps	Goals	Apps	Goals	Apps	Goals
Strasbourg B	2018–19	Championnat National 3	20	0	—		—		20	0
Strasbourg B	2019–20	Championnat National 3	15	1	—		—		15	1
Strasbourg B	Total		35	1	—		—		35	1
Avranches B	2020–21	Championnat National 3	2	1	—		—		2	1
Avranches	2020–21	Championnat National	27	5	1	0	—		28	5
Angers	2021–22	Ligue 1	32	2	1	0	—		33	2
Angers	2022–23	Ligue 1	15	0	0	0	—		15	0
Angers	Total		47	2	1	0	—		48	2
Marseille	2022–23	Ligue 1	7	1	2	0	—		9	1
Marseille	2023–24	Ligue 1	21	2	0	0	14 (Note: Two appearances in UEFA Champions League, twelve appearances in UEFA Europa League)	0	35	2
Marseille	Total		28	3	2	0	14	0	44	3
Panathinaikos (loan)	2024–25	Super League Greece	25	5	3	1	9 (Note: Appearances in UEFA Conference League)	0	37	6
Girona	2025–26	La Liga	24	5	0	0	—		24	5
Panathinaikos	2026–27	Super League Greece	6	1	1	2	1 (Note: Appearances in UEFA Conference League)	0	8	3
Career total			194	23	8	3	24	0	226	26

=== International ===
As of match played 4 October 2026

Appearances and goals by national team and year
National team	Year	Apps	Goals
Morocco	2022	17	2
Morocco	2023	4	1
Morocco	2024	15	4
Morocco	2025	10	2
Morocco	2026	12	3
Total		58	12

Scores and results list Morocco's goal tally first, score column indicates score after each Ounahi goal.

List of international goals scored by Azzedine Ounahi
No.	Date	Venue	Opponent	Score	Result	Competition
1	29 March 2022	Stade Mohammed V, Casablanca, Morocco	DR Congo	1–0	4–1	2022 FIFA World Cup qualification
2	29 March 2022	Stade Mohammed V, Casablanca, Morocco	DR Congo	3–0	4–1	2022 FIFA World Cup qualification
3	12 September 2023	Stade Bollaert-Delelis, Lens, France	Burkina Faso	1–0	1–0	Friendly
4	17 January 2024	Laurent Pokou Stadium, San-Pédro, Ivory Coast	Tanzania	2–0	3–0	2023 Africa Cup of Nations
5	11 June 2024	Adrar Stadium, Agadir, Morocco	Congo	1–0	6–0	2026 FIFA World Cup qualification
6	12 October 2024	Honor Stadium, Oujda, Morocco	Central African Republic	2–0	5–0	2025 Africa Cup of Nations qualification
7	12 October 2024	Honor Stadium, Oujda, Morocco	Central African Republic	4–0	5–0	2025 Africa Cup of Nations qualification
8	5 September 2025	Prince Moulay Abdellah Stadium, Rabat, Morocco	Niger	5–0	5–0	2026 FIFA World Cup qualification
9	14 November 2025	Ibn Batouta Stadium, Tangier, Morocco	Mozambique	1–0	1–0	Friendly
10	4 July 2026	NRG Stadium, Houston, United States	Canada	1–0	3–0	2026 FIFA World Cup
11	4 July 2026	NRG Stadium, Houston, United States	Canada	2–0	3–0	2026 FIFA World Cup
12	29 September 2026	Free State Stadium, Bloemfontein, South Africa	Lesotho	2–0	2–0	2027 Africa Cup of Nations qualification

== Honours ==
Morocco U20

- Mediterranean Games third place: 2018

Morocco

- Africa Cup of Nations: 2025

Individual

- IFFHS Africa Team of The Year: 2022
- Panathinaikos Player of the Season: 2024–25
- Super League Greece Team of the Season: 2024–25

Orders

- Order of the Throne: 2022
