= Zakariya Souleymane =

Nigerien footballer (born 1994)

Personal information
- Date of birth: 29 December 1994 (age 31)
- Place of birth: Lyon, France
- Height: 1.85 m (6 ft 1 in)
- Position: Defender

Team information
- Current team: Lyon La Duchère

Youth career
- Vaulx-en-Velin
- 2010–2013: Evian Thonon Gaillard

Senior career*
Years	Team	Apps	(Gls)
2013–2015	Evian Thonon Gaillard	17	(0)
2017–2019	Saint-Priest	25	(1)
2019–2021	Lorient B	0	(0)
2021–	Lyon La Duchère	4	(0)

International career^{‡}
2014–	Niger	3	(0)
- * Club domestic league appearances and goals as of 08:19, 9 October 2021 (UTC) ‡ National team caps and goals as of 23:58, 8 October 2021 (UTC)

Zakariya Souleymane (born 29 December 1994) is a footballer who plays as a defender for Lyon La Duchère. Born in France, he plays for the Niger national team.

== Career ==
Born in Lyon, France, Souleymane played club football for Vaulx-en-Velin and Evian Thonon Gaillard.

He made his international debut for Niger in 2014.
