= Victorien Adebayor =

Nigerien footballer (born 1996)

Adebayor Zakari Adje
Personal information
- Full name: Adebayor Zakari Victorien Adje
- Date of birth: 12 November 1996 (age 30)
- Place of birth: Niamey, Niger
- Height: 1.84 m (6 ft 0 in)
- Position: Attacking midfielder

Team information
- Current team: Singida Black Stars FC
- Number: 14

Youth career
- Atcha Académie

Senior career*
Years	Team	Apps	(Gls)
2014–2017	AS Douanes		
2017	Raon-l’Étape	0	(0)
2017–2018	AS GNN		
2018–2020	Inter Allies	24	(20)
2018	→ Vejle (loan)	0	(0)
2020–2022	HB Køge	0	(0)
2021	→ Legon Cities (loan)	12	(1)
2021	→ ENPPI (loan)		
2022	US GN		
2022–2023	RS Berkane	1	(0)
2023–2024	AmaZulu	0	(0)
2024	AS GNN	18	(22)
2025	Singida Black Stars FC	10	(5)

International career^{‡}
2015–	Niger	69	(22)
- * Club domestic league appearances and goals as of 30 June 2024 ‡ National team caps and goals as of 6 October 2026

Adebayor Zakari Adje (born 12 November 1996) is a Nigerien professional footballer who plays for DStv Premiership clubs AmaZulu and the Niger national team.

== Club career ==
In 2016, Adebayor had trials with Ligue 1 sides FC Lorient and AS Monaco but was not offered a deal at either club.

On 29 August 2018, Vejle Boldklub in Denmark announced the signing of Adebayor from Inter Allies on a loan deal until 30 June 2019. However, one month later, the club announced that they wanted to terminate the loan deal because Adebayor did not show up as agreed and the club had not been able to get in touch with the player.

However, he returned to Denmark in October 2020, when he signed with Danish 1st Division club HB Køge, which is a professional Danish football club based primarily in the town of Herfølge, and secondly in the town of Køge, both in the Køge Municipality. However, on 4 March 2021, the club confirmed, that Adebayor had been loaned out to Legon Cities, because he wanted to be closer to his family for personal reasons. On 10 September 2021, Adebayor agreed to a year Loan deal with ENPPI SC of Egypt.

== International career ==
Adebayor is the top scorer of Niger with 20 goals.

== Career statistics ==
=== International ===
Scores and results list Niger's goal tally first.

List of international goals scored by Victorien Adebayor
No.	Date	Venue	Opponent	Score	Result	Competition
1.	18 January 2016	Stade Régional Nyamirambo, Kigali, Rwanda	Nigeria	1–2	1–4	2016 African Nations Championship
2.	29 March 2016	Stade Général-Seyni-Kountché, Niamey, Niger	Senegal	1–2	1–2	2017 Africa Cup of Nations qualification
3.	5 September 2017	Stade Adrar, Agadir, Morocco	Mauritania	2–0	2–0	Friendly
4.	27 May 2018	Stade Général Seyni Kountché, Niamey, Niger	Central African Republic	3–2	3–3	Friendly
5.	2 June 2018	Stade Général-Seyni-Kountché, Niamey, Niger	Uganda	1–0	2–1	Friendly
6.	2 June 2018	Stade Général-Seyni-Kountché, Niamey, Niger	Uganda	2–0	2–1	Friendly
7.	18 November 2018	Mavuso Sports Centre, Manzini, Eswatini	Eswatini	1–1	2–1	2019 Africa Cup of Nations qualification
8.	18 November 2018	Mavuso Sports Centre, Manzini, Eswatini	Eswatini	2–0	2–1	2019 Africa Cup of Nations qualification
9.	20 March 2020	Stade Général-Seyni-Kountché, Niamey, Niger	Chad	1–0	2–0	Friendly
10.	11 June 2021	Arslan Zeki Demirci Sports Complex, Manavgat, Turkey	Guinea	1–0	2–0	Friendly
11.	6 September 2021	Prince Moulay Abdellah Stadium, Rabat, Morocco	Djibouti	1–1	4–2	2022 FIFA World Cup qualification
12.	6 September 2021	Prince Moulay Abdellah Stadium, Rabat, Morocco	Djibouti	2–1	4–2	2022 FIFA World Cup qualification
13.	15 November 2021	Stade Général Seyni Kountché, Niamey, Niger	Djibouti	1–0	7–2	2022 FIFA World Cup qualification
14.	15 November 2021	Stade Général Seyni Kountché, Niamey, Niger	Djibouti	2–1	7–2	2022 FIFA World Cup qualification
15.	15 November 2021	Stade Général Seyni Kountché, Niamey, Niger	Djibouti	5–1	7–2	2022 FIFA World Cup qualification
16.	23 March 2022	Stade Cheikha Ould Boïdiya, Nouakchott, Mauritania	Mozambique	1–0	1–1	Friendly
17.	26 March 2022	Stade Cheikha Ould Boïdiya, Nouakchott, Mauritania	Libya	1–2	1–2	Friendly
18.	17 November 2022	Zeytinköy 1 Nolu Saha, Antalya, Turkey	Libya	1–0	2–3	Friendly
19.	17 November 2022	Zeytinköy 1 Nolu Saha, Antalya, Turkey	Libya	2–0	2–3	Friendly
20.	20 November 2022	Atilla Vehbi Konuk Tesisleri, Antalya, Turkey	Gabon	1–2	1–3	Friendly
21.	10 June 2025	Père Jégo Stadium, Casablanca, Morocco	Zimbabwe	1–1	1–1	Friendly
22.	8 October 2025	Stade du 4 Août, Ouagadougou, Burkina Faso	Congo	3–0	3–1	2026 FIFA World Cup qualification

== Honours ==
Individual

- CAF Confederation Cup Top scorer: 2021–22
