= Youssouf Oumarou =

Nigerien footballer

Personal information
- Full name: Youssouf Oumarou Alio
- Date of birth: 16 February 1993 (age 33)
- Place of birth: Niamey, Niger
- Height: 1.90 m (6 ft 3 in)
- Position: Midfielder

Team information
- Current team: Stade Tunisien

Senior career*
Years	Team	Apps	(Gls)
2012–2013	Sahel SC		
2013–2015	AS FAN		
2015	US Bitam		
2016–2017	AS FAN		
2017–2018	MC Oujda		
2018–2019	KAC Kénitra		
2019–2020	US Gendarmerie		
2020–2021	FC San-Pédro		
2021–2023	Union Monastirienne	43	(12)
2023–2024	Espérance de Tunis	6	(2)
2024–2025	Stade Tunisien	24	(9)
2025–2026	Al-Karma	33	(13)
2026	Al-Hazem	10	(1)
2026-	Stade Tunisien	0	(0)

International career^{‡}
2013–	Niger	71	(8)
- * Club domestic league appearances and goals as of 14 September 2026 ‡ National team caps and goals as of 8 October 2025

Youssouf Oumarou Alio (born 16 February 1993) is a Nigerien professional footballer who plays for the Niger national team.

== International career ==
Oumarou debuted internationally for the Niger national team on 13 November 2015 in a friendly match against Nigeria in a 2–0 loss.

On 16 October 2018, he scored his first goal for Niger against Tunisia in a 2–1 defeat during the 2019 Africa Cup of Nations qualification to be held in Cameroon.

On 8 October 2021, during the 2022 FIFA World Cup qualifying match against Algeria, he scored an own goal which resulted in a 6–1 defeat.
