= 2009–10 Ethiopian Premier League =

64th season of top-tier Ethiopian football

Ethiopian Premier League
- Season: 2009–10
- 2011 CAF Champions League: Saint-George SA
- 2011 CAF Confederation Cup: Dedebit (cup winner)
- Highest attendance: 4,101, St. George vs Ethiopian Coffee

The 2009–10 Ethiopian Premier League is the 64th season of the Ethiopian Premier League since its establishment in 1944. A total of 18 teams are contesting the league, with Saint-George SA the defending champions for the second year in a row and for the twenty third time in total. The Ethiopian season began on 6 August 2009.

== Clubs ==
- Adama City FC
- Awassa City FC
- Banks SC
- Defence
- Dedebit
- Dire Dawa City
- EEPCO
- Ethiopian Coffee
- Ethiopian Insurance
- Harrar Beer Bottling FC
- Meta Abo Brewery
- Metehara Sugar
- Muger Cement
- Saint-George SA
- Sebeta City
- Sidama Coffee
- Southern Police
- Trans Ethiopia

== Table and results ==
=== League table ===
Pos	Team	Pld	W	D	L	GF	GA	GD	Pts	Qualification or relegation
1	Saint-George SA (C)	34	26	6	2	62	17	+45	84	CAF Champions League 2011
2	Dedebit	34	17	9	8	48	29	+19	60	CAF Confederation Cup 2011
3	Ethiopian Coffee	34	16	8	10	52	32	+20	56	
4	Awassa City FC	34	13	13	8	37	32	+5	52	
5	Adama City FC	34	13	10	11	39	35	+4	49	
6	Defence	34	13	9	12	46	44	+2	48	
7	Muger Cement	34	11	14	9	29	26	+3	47	
8	Sidama Coffee	33	11	13	9	24	30	−6	46	
9	Harrar Beer Botling FC	33	9	17	7	28	24	+4	44	
10	Sebeta City	34	12	8	14	28	31	−3	44	
11	Banks SC	34	11	9	14	48	52	−4	42	
12	Dire Dawa City	34	10	12	12	30	42	−12	42	
13	Trans Ethiopia	34	9	14	11	27	36	−9	41	
14	EEPCO	34	10	10	14	39	43	−4	40	
15	Insurance	34	11	7	16	38	45	−7	40	
16	Southern Police	34	9	8	17	19	40	−21	35	
17	Metehara Sugar	34	8	10	16	38	49	−11	34	
18	Meta Abo Brewery (R)	34	5	5	24	30	55	−25	20	Relegation to Ethiopian Second Division

(C) Champions; (R) Relegated

=== Teams and stadiums ===
Club	Location	Venue	Seating Capacity
Saint-George SA	Addis Ababa	Addis Ababa Stadium	34,000

Dedebit, Hawassa City, Sidama Coffee, Southern Police, Sebeta City, Dire Dawa City and Meta Abo also use 35,000 capacity Addis Ababa Stadium.
