= List of football clubs in Ethiopia =

Football is Ethiopia's most popular sport. Ethiopia has produced numerous exceptional clubs and international teams, as well as some talented individual players, despite not being one of Africa's main footballing nations. Years in the beginning. This is a list of football (soccer) clubs in Ethiopia. For a complete list see Category:Football clubs in Ethiopia

== A ==
- Adama City FC
- Areka City
- Ambericho FC
- Arba Minch City

== B ==
- Banks SC
- Bahirdar Ketema Football Club
- Beer Bottling Football Club
- Boditi City
- Batu City

== C ==
- Commercial Bank of Ethiopia FC

== D ==
- Dashen Beer
- Defence
- Dire Dawa City
- Dedebit F.C.

== E ==
- EEPCO
- Ethiopian Coffee
- Ethiopian Insurance

== F ==
- Fasil Kenema S.C.

== G ==
- Guna Trading F.C.
- Gamo Chencha FC

== H ==
- Hadiya Hossana F.C.
- Harar City F.C.
- Hawassa City S.C.

== L ==
- Legetafo Legedadi F.C.

== M ==
- Metehara Sugar
- Muger Cement
- Mekelle City

== N ==
- Nyala SC
- Nekemte City

== S ==
- Saint-George SA
- Sebeta City
- Shashemene City
- Sidama Coffee
- Southern Police
- Wolaita Sodo City FC
- Sheger city

== T ==
- Trans Ethiopia
- Tikur Abay Transport

== W ==
- Welwalo Adigrat University FC
- Wolkite City FC
- Wonji Sugar
- Woldia Sport Club
- Wolaita Dicha
