= Abay =

Abay may refer to:

== People ==
- Abay (name)

== Places ==
- Abay District, East Kazakhstan, Kazakhstan
- Abay District, Karagandy Province, Kazakhstan
  - Abay (town), the province's administrative center
- Abay, Almaty, Kazakhstan
- Abay, Aktobe, a village in the Aktobe Province of western Kazakhstan
- Abay, Taşköprü, a village in Turkey
- Abay Chomen, an administrative division in the Oromia Region of Ethiopia
- Gish Abay, a town in west-central Ethiopia
- Alexandria Bay, a village in Upstate New York, US, on the Saint Lawrence River, referred to as Abay

== Other uses ==
- Abay (Almaty Metro), a station of the Line 1 of the Almaty Metro
- Abay Opera House, opera and ballet house in Kazakhstan
- Abay Siti, Somali female institution dating back to early 19th century
- Lesser Abay River, a river of central Ethiopia
- Tikur Abay Transport, an Ethiopian football club
- Abay (novel), by Kazakh writer Mukhtar Auezov
- Abay (film), a 1995 Kazakhstani biographic film that tells Abay Qunanbayuli's life

== See also ==
- Abai (disambiguation)
