= Abady =

Abady is a surname. Notable people with the surname include:

- Jacques Abady (1872–1964), British lawyer
- Josephine Abady (1949–2002), American stage director, film director, and producer
- Shy Abady (born 1965), Israeli artist

== See also ==
- Abay (name)
