= Woldia SC =

Association football club in Ethiopia

Woldia
- Full name: Woldia Sport Club
- Ground: Mohammed Hussein Ali Al-Amoudi Stadium
- Capacity: 25,000
- Manager: Zelalem Shiferaw
- League: Ethiopian Higher League
- 2020-21: Higher League 8th of 9 (Group A)
Home colours	Away colours

Woldia Sport Club (Amharic: ወልዲያ ስፖርት ክለብ ) is an Ethiopian football club based in Weldiya, Ethiopia. They are a member of the Ethiopian Football Federation and play in the Ethiopian Higher League, the second division of Ethiopian football. Their home stadium is Woldiya Stadium.

== History ==
Woldia SC was promoted to the Ethiopian Premier League after the 2015–16 season. It played its first season in the Premier League during the 2016–17 season finishing a respectable 7th place. The club started playing their matches in the newly opened Woldiya Stadium in January 2017.

In May 2018 the club named Zelalem Shiferaw as their new manager after their former manager Zemariam Woldegiorgis was suspended by the Ethiopian Football Federation Discipline Committee.

Woldia was relegated from the Ethiopian Premier League after finishing last in the standings after the 2017–18 season.

== Stadium ==
Woldia SC play their home matches at Mohammed Hussein Ali Al-Amoudi Stadium in Weldiya, Ethiopia. The stadium has a capacity of 25,155 people and includes a ground tennis court, a basketball court, an Olympic size swimming pool, a volleyball field, a handball field and a guest house.

In April 2018 spectators at Woldia Stadium swarmed onto a football pitch during a match against Fasil Kenema F.C., attacking and injuring two match officials and a coach.

== Support ==
Woldia supporters were involved in an incident where a match official was beaten during a game at Woldia Stadium.

== Players ==
=== First-team squad ===
As of 3 April 2021 Note: Flags indicate national team as defined under FIFA eligibility rules; some limited exceptions apply. Players may hold more than one non-FIFA nationality.

No.	Pos.	Nation	Player
—		ETH	Mesfin Kidane
—		ETH	Yared Darza
