= Abai =

Abai or ABAI may refer to:

== People ==
- Abai (martyr) (died 363), saint of the Syrian Church
- Abai Ikwechegh (born 1923), Nigerian jurist
- Abai Qunanbaiuly (1845–1904), Kazakh poet and philosopher
- Abai Tasbolatov (born 1951), Kazakh politician
- A nickname for June Mar Fajardo (born 1989), Filipino basketball player

== Places ==
- Abai Region, Kazakhstan
- Abaí, Caazapá Department, Paraguay
- Abai village, Sokcho City, Gangwon Province, South Korea
- Abae, a city of ancient Greece

== Other uses ==
- Abai (opera), a 1944 Kazakh-language opera
- Abai (house), a traditional village meeting house
- Abai language
- Abai Kazakh National Pedagogical University, in Almaty, Kazakhstan
- American Board of Allergy and Immunology, a member board of the American Board of Medical Specialties
- Association for Behavior Analysis International

== See also ==
- Abay (disambiguation)
