= 2018–19 Ethiopian Premier League =

73rd season of top-tier Ethiopian football

Ethiopian Premier League
- Season: 2018–19
- Dates: 28 October 2018 – 7 July 2019
- Champions: Mekelle City
- Top goalscorer: Amanuel Gebremichael (17 goals)
- Highest attendance: 60,000 Mekelle 2-1 Dire Dawa (7 July 2019)

The 2018–19 Ethiopian Premier League was the 73rd season of top-tier football in Ethiopia (21st season as the Premier League). The season started on 27 October 2018. Mekelle were crowned Ethiopian football champions for the first time in their history after beating Dire Dawa in front of 60,000 spectators. Mekelle drew an average home attendance of 18,212, the highest in the Ethiopian Premier League during that league season.

== League table ==
Pos	Team	Pld	W	D	L	GF	GA	GD	Pts	Qualification or relegation
1	Mekelle City (C)	30	18	5	7	45	24	+21	59	Qualification for Champions League
2	Sidama Coffee	30	17	7	6	45	29	+16	58	
3	Fasil City (Q)	30	15	12	3	49	17	+32	57	Qualification for Confederation Cup (Note: Fasil City are Ethiopian Cup winners.)
4	Saint George	29	12	10	7	28	18	+10	46	
5	Jimma Aba Jifar	30	12	10	8	33	36	−3	46	
6	Hawassa City	30	12	8	10	42	31	+11	44	
7	Wolayta Dicha	30	10	11	9	34	27	+7	41	
8	Bahir Dar City	30	10	11	9	27	31	−4	41	
9	Ethiopian Coffee	30	10	9	11	27	23	+4	39	
10	Welwalo Adigrat University	29	9	10	10	16	21	−5	37	
11	Adama City	30	8	11	11	28	28	0	35	
12	Dire Dawa City	30	9	8	13	29	34	−5	35	
13	Shire Endaselassie	30	7	13	10	29	39	−10	34	
14	Defence Force (R)	30	8	8	14	37	57	−20	32	Relegation to Ethiopian Super League
15	Debub Police (R)	30	7	8	15	34	41	−7	29	Relegation to Ethiopian Super League
16	Dedebit (R)	30	4	1	25	21	68	−47	13	Relegation to Ethiopian Super League

Updated to match(es) played on 7 July 2019. Source: soccerethiopia.net
Rules for classification: 1) Points; 2) Goal difference; 3) Goals scored.
(C) Champions; (Q) Qualified for the phase indicated; (R) Relegated

== Map ==
Locations of the Ethiopia Premier League 2018–19 teams
