= Juneidi Basha =

Ethiopian business executive

- ጁኔይዲ ባሻ
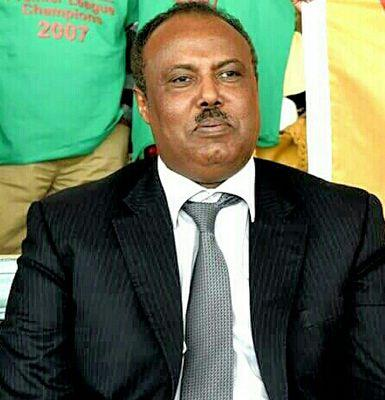
- President of Ethiopian Football Federation

Ethiopian Football Federation
- In office 10 October 2013 – 3 June 2018
- Preceded by: Sahilu Gebrewold

Ethiopian Chamber of Commerce and Sectoral Associations
- In office April 2010 – December 2014

Harar Brewery
- In office May 1994 – April 2012

Personal details
- Born: February 19, 1961 Arsi Province, Ethiopian Empire
- Education: Addis Ababa University (BSc); University of Greenwich (MBA)
- Occupation: Business Executive

Juneidi Basha (Ge'ez: ጁኔይዲ ባሻ; born February 19, 1961) is an Ethiopian business executive who served as the General Manager of Harar Brewery and Vice President of the Ethiopian Chamber of Commerce and Sectoral Associations. He most recently served as the President of the Ethiopian Football Federation.

== Career ==
Juneidi began his career as a Chemist at Harar Brewery soon after graduating from the Addis Ababa University and rose up through the ranks to be appointed as the General Manager of the brewery in 1994. In the 18 years he served as General Manager, Juneidi led the brewery to great heights for which he was highly regarded by many in the region and the management and the employees of the brewery who collectively awarded him an automobile in 2006 in recognition of his leadership and dedication.

Juneidi was elected as the Vice President of the Ethiopian Chamber of Commerce and Sectoral Associations in 2009 and again in 2011 for another two-year term.

Juneidi was elected President of the Ethiopian Football Federation on 10 October 2013 garnering 56 of the 101 votes of the General Assembly.

He was appointed as a member of FIFA Marketing and TV Committee from 2014 to 2016 as well as CAF African Cup of Nations Organizing Committee from 2014 to 2018. In February 2016, FIFA electoral committee assigned him as one of four independent scrutineers of the 2016 FIFA Presidential elections in Zurich.

In February 2014, he was appointed Deputy General Manager of the Turkish multinational cable company BMET Energy and helped BMET penetrate the competitive cable market locally and regionally.

Juneidi currently chairs the board of Kush Bank (currently under formation) and also sits on the board of Kegna Beverages S.C., a 5.5 billion birr beverage plant located in Ginchi, West Oromia region. He has held board leadership roles in various organizations over the course of his career. He has served as Board Chairman of the Dire Dawa Coca-Cola East African Bottling Co., Dire Dawa Edible Oil Factory, Babille Mineral Water Factory, Cheshire Services Ethiopia and Hamaressa Edible Oil Factory, to name a few. He has also served as a Board Member of Dire Dawa University, the International Leadership Institute, East Hararghe Zone Red Cross Society and Dire Dawa Textile Factory.

== Education ==
Juneidi holds a Bachelor of Science degree in chemistry from Addis Ababa University and Master of Business Administration (MBA) from the University of Greenwich.

== Awards ==
He received the National Green Hero Award from President Girma Woldegiorgis of the Ethiopian Federal Democratic Republic twice in 2006 and 2007. In 2012, he was awarded by Prime Minister Hailemariam Desalegn of Ethiopia as one of top 3 industry leaders in the nation along with former Minister of Trade and Industry Girma Birru. He received the CAF Presidential Award from President Issa Hayatou of the Confederation of African Football in 2016.

== Marriage and children ==
Juneidi Basha is married and has 4 children, two girls and two boys. He currently lives in Addis Ababa, Ethiopia.
