= Amanuel Gebremichael =

Ethiopian footballer (born 1999)

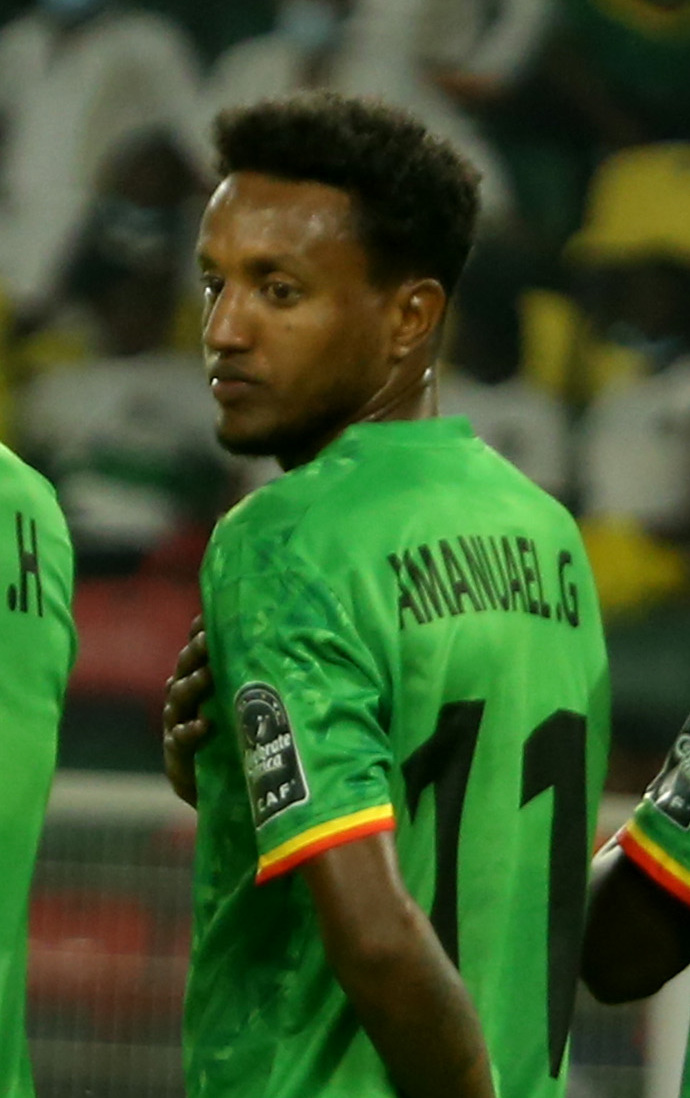
- Gebremichael with Ethiopia at the 2021 Africa Cup of Nations

Personal information
- Full name: Amanuel Gebremichael Aregwai
- Date of birth: 5 February 1999 (age 27)
- Place of birth: Gambela, Ethiopia
- Position: Forward

Team information
- Current team: Fasil Kenema
- Number: 11

Senior career*
Years	Team	Apps	(Gls)
2016–2020	Mekelle 70 Enderta		
2020–2023	Saint George	69	(12)
2023–	Fasil Kenema	11	(4)

International career^{‡}
2018–	Ethiopia U23	4	(1)
2017–	Ethiopia	42	(7)
- * Club domestic league appearances and goals as of 19:47, 1 March 2024 (UTC) ‡ National team caps and goals as of 19:47, 27 March 2023 (UTC)

Amanuel Gebremichael Aregwai (Amharic: አማኑኤል ገብረ ሚካኤል; born 5 February 1999) is an Ethiopian professional footballer who plays as a forward for Ethiopian Premier League club Fasil Kenema and the Ethiopia national team.

== Club career ==
=== Mekelle 70 Enderta ===
==== 2016–17: Debut season and promotion ====
Mekelle 70 Enderta finished second in their group in the Ethiopian Higher League in 2016–17, and Gebremichael scored a goal in their victory over Hadiya Hossana in the promotion playoff game to earn the club's first-ever promotion to the Ethiopian Premier League.

==== 2018–19: Top goalscorer ====
On the final matchday of the 2018–19 season, he scored the winning goal in a 2–1 victory over Dire Dawa Kenema that put them one point ahead of Sidama Coffee, securing their first-ever title. He also finished the year with a league-best 17 goals.

==== 2019–20: Final season and departure ====
He scored two goals against Cano Sport, one in each leg, in their 2019–20 CAF Champions League preliminary qualifying matchup, but they still lost by an aggregate scoreline of 3–2.

== International career ==
Gebremichael made his senior international debut on 5 December 2017, coming on for Dawa Hotessa during their 3–0 win over South Sudan in the 2017 CECAFA Cup. He earned his second cap the following year in a loss to Ghana during 2019 Africa Cup of Nations qualification, and scored his maiden international goal in his fourth cap against Djibouti on 4 August 2019 during 2020 African Nations Championship qualification.

He scored in his debut with the national under-23 team, a 4–0 defeat of Somalia at home in the first round of 2019 Africa U-23 Cup of Nations qualification.

== Career statistics ==
As of match played 25 March 2021

Appearances and goals by national team and year
National team	Year	Apps	Goals
Ethiopia	2017	1	0
Ethiopia	2018	1	0
Ethiopia	2019	9	1
Ethiopia	2020	5	2
Ethiopia	2021	2	1
Total		18	4

Scores and results list Ethiopia's goal tally first, score column indicates score after each Gebremichael goal.

List of international goals scored by Amanuel Gebremichael
No.	Date	Venue	Opponent	Score	Result	Competition
1	4 August 2019	Dire Dawa Stadium, Dire Dawa, Ethiopia	Djibouti	1–0	4–3	2020 African Nations Championship qualification
2	6 November 2020	Addis Ababa Stadium, Addis Ababa, Ethiopia	Sudan	2–2	2–2	Friendly
3	17 November 2020	Addis Ababa Stadium, Addis Ababa, Ethiopia	Niger	1–0	3–0	2021 Africa Cup of Nations qualification
4	24 March 2021	Bahir Dar Stadium, Bahir Dar, Ethiopia	Madagascar	1–0	4–0	2021 Africa Cup of Nations qualification
5	30 December 2021	Limbe Stadium, Limbe, Cameroon	Sudan	1–0	3–2	Friendly
6	30 December 2021	Limbe Stadium, Limbe, Cameroon	Sudan	2–1	3–2	Friendly

== Honours ==
Mekelle 70 Enderta

- Ethiopian Premier League: 2018–19

Individual

- Ethiopian Premier League top scorer: 2018–19
