= Augusta Victoria (disambiguation) =

Augusta Victoria may refer to:

- Augusta Victoria of Schleswig-Holstein (1858–1921), wife of Kaiser Wilhelm II and last German empress
- Augusta Victoria of Hohenzollern (1890–1966), Queen consort of Portugal
- SS Augusta Victoria, an ocean liner
- Augusta Victoria Hospital, East Jerusalem
- Augusta Victoria, a series of paintings by Shy Abady
- Cerro Augusta Victoria, Antofagasta, Chile, a mountain

== See also ==
- RMS Empress of Scotland (1905), an ocean liner originally named SS Kaiserin Auguste Victoria
