= Sebeta City F.C. =

Association football club in Ethiopia

Sebeta City
- Full name: Sebeta City Football Club
- Founded: 2005; 21 years ago
- Ground: Sebeta Stadium; Sebeta, Ethiopia
- Capacity: 5,000
- Chairman: (Ethiopia) Obsa Legese
- Manager: (Ethiopia) Abraham Mebratu
- League: Ethiopian Higher League
- 2020–21: Premier League 8th of 13
Home colours	Away colours

Sebeta City (Oromo: Magaalaa sabbataa; Amharic: ሰበታ ከተማ, Sebeta Ketema) is an Ethiopian professional football club based in Sebeta. They play in the Ethiopian Higher League, the second division of Ethiopian football.

== History ==
Sebeta City F.C. was founded in 2005.

In the 2010–2011 season of Ethiopian Premier League, the club was relegated to the Ethiopian second division after finishing in fourteenth place.

The club was promoted to the Ethiopian Premier League after winning their group in the 2018–19 Ethiopian Higher League season.

== Stadium ==
Their home stadium is Sebeta Stadium, which has a capacity of 5,000. As part of a sponsorship deal, the club announced that a standard football pitch would be constructed at Sebeta Stadium. The renovation work at the stadium was finished in April 2020.

== Finances ==
In December 2019 the club signed a four year sponsorship deal, worth 18 million Birr a year, with Meta Abo Brewery. The club had a contractual dispute with their former head coach Webetu Abate and the EFF after he left the club to coach the Ethiopian national team.

== Players ==
=== First-team squad ===
As of 8 January 2021

Note: Flags indicate national team as defined under FIFA eligibility rules; some limited exceptions apply. Players may hold more than one non-FIFA nationality.

No.	Pos.	Nation	Player
1	GK	ETH	Mintesinot Alo
3	MF	ETH	Mesoud Mohammed
4	DF	ETH	Anteneh Tesfaye
5	DF	ETH	Getu Hailemariam
6	DF	ETH	Daniel Hailu
7	FW	ETH	Bulcha Shura
8	MF	ETH	Fuad Fereja
9	FW	ETH	Ibrahim Kedir
10	MF	ETH	Dawit Estifanos
11	FW	ETH	Natnael Ganchula
12	DF	ETH	Biadgelegn Elias
13	DF	ETH	Messay Paulos
14	DF	ETH	Alemayehu Muleta

No.	Pos.	Nation	Player
15	DF	UGA	Abdulhafiz Tofik
16	FW	ETH	Fitsum Gebremariam
17	MF	ETH	Taddele Mengesha
19	FW	ETH	Israel Eshetu
20	FW	ETH	Kalkidan Zelalem
21	DF	ETH	Addis Tesfaye
22	FW	ETH	Remedan Muhdin
23	DF	ETH	Hailemichael Adefres
24	DF	ETH	Yared Hassen
27	FW	ETH	Duresa Shubisa
29	GK	ETH	Solomon Demissie
44	GK	ETH	Fasil Gebremichael
—	FW	GHA	Osei Mawuli

== Club officials ==
CEO: (Ethiopia) Alemayehu *Mendaye

- Chairman: (Ethiopia) Obsa Legese

=== Coaching staff ===
Manager/Head coach:

- (Ethiopia) Abraham Mebratu

== Former players ==
- (Uganda) Savio Kabugo (2019–20)

== See also ==
- Ethiopian Cup
- List of football clubs in Ethiopia
