= 2020–21 Ethiopian Higher League =

The 2020–21 Ethiopian Higher League is the second-tier football in Ethiopia. The competition is split into 3 different stages and will be contested by 33 clubs. In Stage 1 Group A's games will take place in Hawassa starting January 5, 2021, while Group B and Group C will take place in Batu & Dire Dawa respectively starting January 2, 2021. In stage 2 the games will be contested in Hawassa (Group A), Woldiya (Group B), Nekemte (Group C).

== League table ==
As of 10 March 2021

=== 2020-21 Ethiopian Higher League Group A ===
Pos	Team	Pld	W	D	L	GF	GA	GD	Pts	Qualification or Relegation
1	Ethio Electric	8	5	2	1	10	6	4	17	Qualification for Ethiopian Premier League
2	Mekelakeya	8	5	1	2	12	6	6	16	
3	Dessie City	8	5	1	2	11	5	6	16	
4	Gelan City	8	4	4	0	6	2	4	16	
5	Federal Police	8	3	1	4	7	10	-3	10	
6	Legetafo Legedadi	8	2	3	3	6	8	-2	9	
7	Semien Shewa Debre Birhan	8	1	4	3	5	7	-2	7	
8	Woldia	8	1	1	6	5	11	-6	4	
9	Wollo Kombolcha	8	1	1	6	6	13	-7	4	

=== 2020-21 Ethiopian Higher League Group B ===
Pos	Team	Pld	W	D	L	GF	GA	GD	Pts	Qualification or Relegation
1	Addis Abeba City	11	9	1	1	25	6	19	28	Qualification for Ethiopian Premier League
2	Hambericho Durame	11	6	3	2	19	5	14	21	
3	Halaba City	11	4	6	1	11	8	3	18	
4	Sodo City	11	5	3	3	16	16	0	18	
5	Gamo Chencha	11	3	5	3	11	11	0	14	
6	Shashemene City	11	3	4	4	13	14	-1	13	
7	Nekemte City	11	3	4	4	12	17	-5	13	
8	ECWCE	11	2	6	3	14	15	-1	12	
9	Jimma Aba Bunna	11	3	2	6	13	23	-10	11	
10	Akaki Kality	11	2	4	5	12	17	-5	10	
11	Bench Maji Bunna	11	2	4	5	14	22	-8	10	
12	Kafa Bunna	11	1	4	6	8	14	-6	7	

=== 2020-21 Ethiopian Higher League Group C ===
Pos	Team	Pld	W	D	L	GF	GA	GD	Pts	Qualification or Relegation
1	Arba Minch City	11	6	5	0	14	3	11	23	Qualification for Ethiopian Premier League
2	Kolfie Keranio	11	7	2	2	19	10	9	23	
3	Ethiopia Medin	11	6	3	2	12	4	8	21	
4	Butajira City	11	5	4	2	11	10	1	19	
5	Negelle Arsi	11	3	5	3	11	12	-1	14	
6	Debub Police	11	3	5	3	10	11	-1	14	
7	Yeka	11	4	2	5	8	12	-4	14	
8	Siltie Worabe	11	2	6	3	10	9	1	12	
9	Gedio Dilla	11	3	3	5	12	14	-2	12	
10	Batu City	11	2	4	5	10	15	-5	10	
11	St. Kirkos	11	1	4	6	7	16	-9	7	
12	Kambata Shinshicho	11	1	3	7	11	19	-8	6	

== Promoted clubs' stadiums ==
Team	Location	Stadium	Capacity
Ethio Electric S.C.	Addis Ababa	Mebrat Hail Stadium	8,000
Arba Minch City F.C.	Arba Minch	Arba Minch Stadium	5,000
Addis Ababa City F.C.	Addis Ababa	Addis Ababa Stadium	35,000
