= Abraham Mebratu =

Ethiopian football coach (born 1970)

Personal information
- Date of birth: April 6, 1970 (age 56)
- Place of birth: Ethiopia

Managerial career
- Years: Team
- 2012: Yemen U22
- Yemen (technical director)
- 2017–2018: Yemen
- 2018–2020: Ethiopia

Abraham Mebratu (Amharic: አብርሃም መብራቱ) is an Ethiopian football coach.

== Managerial career ==
=== Yemen ===
==== Under-22 ====
Coach of the Yemen U22 for the 2013 AFC U-22 Championship qualification, Mebratu led the team to 1–0 victory over Nepal in their first group stage clash, facing Uzbekistan in their second and holding them to a mundane 1–1 draw. Next, he led his charges to a 5–1 triumph over Bangladesh, sealing qualification into the 2013 tournament.

Holding the post of Yemen Football Association technical director, Mebratu expressed concern for the preparation of the Under-23 players ahead of the 2016 AFC U-23 Championship due to the Yemeni Civil War which is afflicting football in Yemen by the prorogation of the local league.

==== Senior ====
Booking their place in the second round of the 2019 AFC Asian Cup qualification by beating the Maldives twice 2–0 in the play-offs, the Ethiopian-born coach praised his Yemen national team players for their efforts in the qualifying phase.

He was an instructor for a B License Coaching Course held in Ethiopia in 2012.

In March 2018, his Yemen senior team qualified for the 2019 AFC Asian Cup for the first time.

=== Ethiopia ===
On July 19, 2018, Mebratu was appointed head coach of the Ethiopian national team. In August 2020, the Ethiopian Football Federation (EFF) decided not to renew his contract amid the COVID-19 pandemic.
