= Savio Kabugo =

Ugandan footballer (born 1995)

Personal information
- Full name: Savio Kabugo
- Date of birth: 20 January 1995 (age 31)
- Place of birth: Kampala, Uganda
- Position: Defender

Senior career*
| Years | Team | Apps | (Gls) |
| 2011–2014 | SCVU | | |
| 2014–2015 | KCCA FC | | |
| 2015–2016 | URA | | |
| 2015–2017 | Proline | | |
| 2018 | SC Villa | | |
| 2019 | Vita Club | | |
| 2019 | Sebeta City | | (20) |
| 2022 | Jwaneng | | |
| 2023–2024 | Lugazi | | |

International career^{‡}
| 2012– | Uganda | 8 | (1) |
- * Club domestic league appearances and goals as of 22 December 2013 ‡ National team caps and goals as of 2 October 2013

Savio Kabugo (born 20 January 1995) is a Ugandan professional footballer who last played for Lugazi.

== Club career ==
Kabugo has played football in clubs such as Victoria University SC, KCCA FC, URA FC and currently plays in Proline FC.

=== Victoria University ===
After his good performance in the Fufa Super League, Uganda Cup and for the Uganda national football team, Kabugo had a chance for trial at Bidvest Wits in June 2013.

In September 2014 with the national team, he was injured and his last club game in 2014 was in December against Bright Stars, which he was able to play after taking some pain killers.

=== KCCA FC ===
In January 2015, Kabugo joined Kampala City Council Authority Football He was among the KCCA FC players who had an accident while traveling to Ntungamo for a Uganda Cup final in 2015 against SC Villa.

=== URA FC ===
On 4 December 2015, Kabugo signed for URA FC on a one-year deal. He played six full games for the club. URA's 2-1 defeat to Express F.C. in March 2016 was his last game for the club.

=== Proline FC ===
In August 2016, Kabugo joined Proline Football Club. On 18 October 2016, he scored his first goal for the club against Sadolin Paints F.C. at the Kyabazinga Stadium in Bugembe.

=== AS Vita Club ===
In December 2018, Kabugo joined AS Vita Club from SC Villa on a three-year contract.

=== Sebeta City ===
On 31 October 2019, Kabugo moved to the Ethiopian club Sebeta City.

=== Jwaneng Galaxy FC ===
From 23 January 2022 to 6 October 2022, Kabugo played for Jwaneng Galaxy FC.

=== Lugazi FC ===
From 1 July 2023 to 22 July 2024, Kabugo played for Lugazi FC.

== International career ==
Kabugo made his Uganda national team debut on 6 February 2013 at the Amahoro Stadium in Kigali in a friendly game between Uganda and Rwanda where the match ended 2–2. He played at the heart of defence partnering Denis Guma. Kabugo is remembered for the ninth minute header which ensured a crucial 1–0 victory for Uganda against Ghana in the penultimate 2015 Nations Cup qualifier at Namboole Stadium.

In January 2014, coach Milutin Sedrojevic, invited him to be a part of the Uganda squad for the 2014 African Nations Championship. The team finished third in the group stage of the competition after beating Burkina Faso, drawing with Zimbabwe and losing to Morocco.

When Uganda played Ghana 1–0 at Namboole in an AFCON qualifier in November 2014, Kabugo's headed goal ensured a much-needed win. He was always imposing in the air. Using his body, he was difficult to get past, winning the several blocks and tackles.

After Uganda's match with Togo at Namboole Stadium, Kabugo was given a match jersey and a pair of boots by Emmanuel Adebayor in the Uganda dressing room after impressing him in the match.

=== International goals ===
| No. | Date | Venue | Opponent | Score | Result | Competition |
|---|---|---|---|---|---|---|
| 1. | 15 November 2014 | Mandela National Stadium, Kampala, Uganda | Ghana | 1–0 | 1–0 | 2015 Africa Cup of Nations qualification |

== Personal life ==
Kabugo's parents died when he was young. He is a cousin of Ivan Bukenya, a Ugandan professional footballer who formerly played for Kaizer Chiefs in the South African Premier Soccer League.

== Honours ==
SC Victoria University

- Ugandan Cup winner: 2013
- Ugandan Super Cup runner-up: 2013

Individual

- Uganda Footballer of the Year runner-up: 2014
