= Imam Ahmed Stadium =

Stadium in Harar, Ethiopia

Coordinates: 9°19′N 42°7′E

Imam Ahmed Stadium (Amharic: ሐረር ኢማም አሕመድ ስታድየም) It is mostly used for football matches and serves as the home stadium of Harar City F.C. (formerly Harar Beer F.C.). The stadium has a capacity of 10,000 people. Dire Dawa City S.C. briefly used the stadium as its home in 2018 while renovation were taking place at their own home stadium, Dire Dawa Stadium.

== See also ==
- Aw Abadir Stadium
