= Radu Klapper =

Israeli poet and writer (1937–2006)

- ראדו קלפר
- Born: 14 September 1937; Bucharest, Romania
- Died: 30 October 2006 (aged 69); Tel Aviv, Israel
- Resting place: Yarkon Cemetery
- Education: University of Bucharest
- Occupations: Poet; Librarian
- Writing career
- Genre: Poetry

Radu Klapper (Hebrew: ראדו קלפר; 14 September 1937 in Bucharest, Romania – 30 October 2006 in Tel Aviv, Israel) was a Romanian-Israeli poet and author.

== Career ==
Radu Klapper was born in 1937 in Bucharest in a Jewish-Romanian family and grew up in a multi-linguistic environment. He studied librarianship and philology at the University of Bucharest and after completing his studies published poetry in different anthologies, and worked as an art critic in various newspapers in Romania. In 1976 Klapper immigrated to Israel and became a theater and dance critic in foreign magazines in Israel and France such as Dance in Israel and Saison de la danse. He also continued to publish his poetry in different Romanian anthologies. In 1991, he started to work in the Dance Library of Israel and in 1993, he became the library's director. During his time at the Dance Library, Klapper became known as a great supporter of artists and dancers, young and old. His vast knowledge and unique character turn Radu and the library to a pilgrimage site.

His first Hebrew poetry book, The Hart Paces, came out in 1998, and in 2003, he published two more books: Forbidden Songs and a prose book, Jews Against Their Will, that dealt with the relationship between famous figures and their Jewish identity, among them: the French singer Barbara, the actress Simone Signoret, the psychoanalyst Bruno Bettelheim, the Camondo family and Romain Gary. Radu was gay and his poetry often dealt with homoerotic desire and unfulfilled love, accompanied by wisdom and sharp insight. His writings introduced into Hebrew literature a touch of European poetry.

In October 2006, at the age of 69, Radu Klapper died of pneumonia. After his death the Israeli artist Shy Abady created the art series "Radu" as an homage to Klapper and his image. The series was first presented in January 2012 at Zadik Gallery in Jaffa and was accompanied with some events that were dedicated to the image of Klapper.

== Prizes and distinctions ==
- Beniamin Fundoianu Prize of the Association of the Israeli Writers of Romanian Expression

== Sources ==
- Federația Comunităților Evreiești din România - Acad.Nicolae Cajal, Dr. Hary Kuller Contribuția evreilor din România la cultură și civilizație, Editura Hasefer, 2004, p. 838, (in Romanian)
