= Debub Police SC =

Association football club in Ethiopia

Debub Police
- Full name: Debub Police Sports Club
- Founded: 1996 (1989 E.C.)
- Ground: Awassa Stadium; Awassa, Ethiopia
- Capacity: 10,000
- Manager: (Ethiopia) Yalew Temsgen(Interim)
- League: Ethiopian Premier League
- 2020-21: Higher League 6th of 12 (Group C)
Home colours	Away colours

Debub Police Sport Club (Amharic:ደቡብ ፖሊስ ስፖርት ክለብ) is an Ethiopian football club based in Hawassa. They play in the Ethiopian Higher League, the second division of Ethiopian football.

== History ==
Debub Police S.C. was founded in 1996 (1989 E.C.) in Hawassa, Ethiopia. Debub Police was first promoted to the Ethiopian Premier League in the 2006–07 season.

Notable the Ethiopian striker Getaneh Kebede started his career at Debub Police.

Debub Police secured promotion to the Ethiopian Premier League on August 27, 2018, after a 3–0 win over the Dire Dawa Police. In September 2018 the club announced it had signed Zelalem Shiferaw as its new manager after parting ways with former manager Girma Tadesse.

== Grounds ==
Debub Police play their home games at Hawassa Stadium in the city of Hawassa in the Sidama Region of Ethiopia. Notably the playing surface at Hawassa Stadium is artificial turf.

== Former managers ==
- (Ethiopia) Girma Tadesse
- (Ethiopia) Zelalem Shiferaw

== Players ==
=== Current squad ===
Note: Flags indicate national team as defined under FIFA eligibility rules; some limited exceptions apply. Players may hold more than one non-FIFA nationality.

No.	Pos.	Nation	Player
—	GK	ETH	Dawit Assefa
—		ETH	Binyam Admasu
—		ETH	Abebayehu Yohannes
—		ETH	Mikael Lemma
—	DF	ETH	Desta Echamo
—	DF	ETH	Edamu Mohamed
—	DF	ETH	Abebaw Butako
—	MF	ETH	Addisalem Debebe
—	MF	ETH	Ermeyas Belay
—		ETH	Zelalem Esayas
—	DF	ETH	Samson Assefa
—	FW	KEN	Erik Muranda
—	FW	ETH	Brihanu Bekele

No.	Pos.	Nation	Player
—	FW	ETH	Ayele Tesfaye
—	FW	ETH	Biruk Elias
—	FW	ETH	Carlos Damitew
—	MF	ETH	Enagaw Badeg
—	DF	ETH	Zeryehun Ashebom
—	MF	ETH	Habtamu Tilahun
—	FW	ETH	Behailu Wegene
—	FW	ETH	Henok Ayele
