= Abubeker Nassir =

Ethiopian footballer (born 2000)

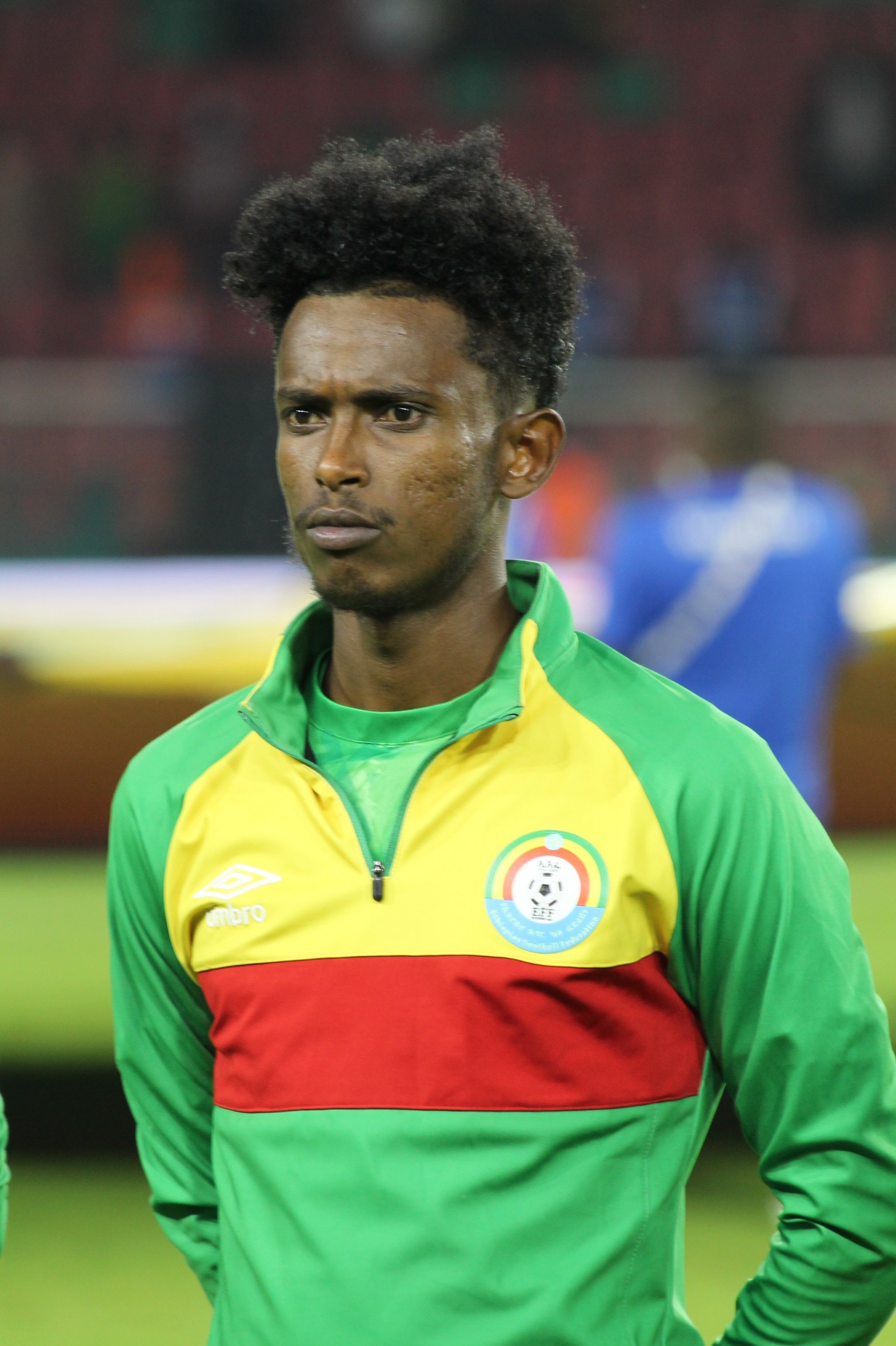
- Nassir with Ethiopia at the 2021 Africa Cup of Nations

Personal information
- Full name: Abubeker Nassir Ahmed
- Date of birth: 23 February 2000 (age 26)
- Place of birth: Addis Ababa, Ethiopia
- Height: 1.85 m (6 ft 1 in)
- Position: Left winger

Team information
- Current team: Mamelodi Sundowns

Youth career
- 2014–2016: Harar City

Senior career*
Years	Team	Apps	(Gls)
2016–2022	Ethiopian Coffee	56	(51)
2022–	Mamelodi Sundowns	18	(4)
2024–2025	→ SuperSport United (loan)	14	(2)
2026–	Defence Force	0	(0)

International career^{‡}
- Ethiopia U17
- Ethiopia U23
2019–	Ethiopia	23	(8)
- * Club domestic league appearances and goals as of 30 June 2024 ‡ National team caps and goals as of 24 March 2025

Abubeker Nassir Ahmed (Amharic: አቡበከር ናስር አህመድ; born 23 February 2000) is an Ethiopian professional footballer who plays as a forward for National First Division club University of Pretoria and the Ethiopia national team.

== Early life ==
Nassir was born on 23 February 2000 in Addis Ababa, Ethiopia.

== Club career ==
=== Ethiopian Coffee ===
Nassir left his first club Harar City in 2016 (2009 E.C.) to join perennial powerhouse Ethiopian Coffee. Nassir initially played with the club's B team before quickly working his way into the senior team. In 2020, Nassir signed a contract extension with Ethiopian Coffee that would keep him at the club until 2025.

=== Mamelodi Sundowns ===
In 2021, Kaizer Chiefs and Mamelodi Sundowns of the DStv Premiership have reportedly stepped up the chase for Ethiopian wonderkid Abubeker Nassir. Furthermore, both Chiefs and Sundowns are not the only teams interested in Nassir as clubs from Algeria and Egypt are also keeping an eye on him. According to KickOff, Coffee have already turned down offers from Tanzanian club Azam after they had tabled concrete offers for the striker. The publication reports that Nassir also has offers in Georgia and in lower divisions of Spanish football.

==== 2024–25: Loan to SuperSport United ====
Mamelodi Sundowns coach Manqoba Mngqithi confirmed Abubeker Nassir's move to rivals SuperSport United.

== International career ==
=== International goals ===
Scores and results list Ethiopia's goal tally first.

No.	Date	Venue	Opponent	Score	Result	Competition
1	17 March 2021	Bahir Dar Stadium, Bahir Dar, Ethiopia	Malawi	4–0	4–0	Friendly
2	24 March 2021	Bahir Dar Stadium, Bahir Dar, Ethiopia	Madagascar	3–0	4–0	2021 Africa Cup of Nations qualification
3	30 August 2021	Bahir Dar Stadium, Bahir Dar, Ethiopia	Uganda	1–0	2–1	Friendly
4	14 November 2021	National Sports Stadium, Harare, Zimbabwe	Zimbabwe	1–1	1–1	2022 FIFA World Cup qualification
5	5 June 2022	Bingu National Stadium, Lilongwe, Malawi	Malawi	1–2	1–2	2023 Africa Cup of Nations qualification
6	24 March 2025	Ben M'Hamed El Abdi Stadium, El Jadida, Morocco	Djibouti	2–0	6–1	2026 FIFA World Cup qualification
7	24 March 2025	Ben M'Hamed El Abdi Stadium, El Jadida, Morocco	Djibouti	3–0	6–1	2026 FIFA World Cup qualification
8	24 March 2025	Ben M'Hamed El Abdi Stadium, El Jadida, Morocco	Djibouti	5–1	6–1	2026 FIFA World Cup qualification
