= Harar City FC =

Association football club in Ethiopia

Harar City F.C.
- Full name: Harar City Football Club
- Ground: Imam Ahmed Stadium
- Capacity: 10,000
- League: Ethiopian First League
Home colours	Away colours

Harar City Football Club (Amharic: ሐረር ከተማ እግር ኳስ ክለብ) is a professional Ethiopian football club based in Harar. They are a member of the Ethiopian Football Federation and play in the Ethiopian First League, the third division of Ethiopian football.

== History ==
The club was founded and originally operated by Harar Brewary as Harar Beer F.C. The club enjoyed a 12-year stay in the Ethiopian Premier League before being relegated after the 2013-14 season.

In 2014, the club was sold by the brewery to local investors and subsequently had its name changed to Harar City F.C.

== Stadium ==
The club currently plays its home matches at Harar Stadium, although it may be replaced by Aw Abadir Stadium. The new stadium is currently unfinished, but is scheduled to be completed in 2023, according to Harari Region president Ordin Bedri.

== Academy ==
The club previously had U17 team that produced such players as Abubeker Nassir.

== Honors ==
=== Domestic ===
- Ethiopian Cup: 1

2007

=== African ===
- CAF Confederation Cup: 1 appearance

2008 – Preliminary Round

== Former coaches ==
- (Ethiopia) Tsegaye Kedanemariam (2006–11)

== Former players ==
- (Ethiopia) Abel Yalew
- (Ethiopia) Abubeker Nassir

== See also ==
- Harar Brewery
