= Abay, Almaty =

Abay Абай
- Village
- Location in Kazakhstan
- Coordinates: 43°12′33″N 76°45′37″E
- Country: Kazakhstan
- Region: Almaty Region
- District: Karasay District

Population (2009)
  - Total: 10,439
- Time zone: UTC+6 (Omsk Time)
- Postal code: 040905
- Area code: 72771

Abay (Kazakh: Абай, Abai) is a village in Almaty Region of south-eastern Kazakhstan. During the Soviet era it was called Oktyabrskoye Desyatoye.

== Geography ==
Abay is a suburb that lies south-west of Almaty and north-east of Karasay on the M33 highway.

== Economy ==
The village relies on the Zhalpaksaiskoe Reservoir, located to the southeast of the village for its water supplies. Agricultural land lies to the north of the village between the M33 and to the south.
