= Abay, Aktobe =

Abay Абай Imeni Abaya
- Village
- Location in Kazakhstan
- Coordinates: 50°10′53″N 58°19′09″E
- Country: Kazakhstan
- Region: Aktobe Region
- Time zone: UTC+5 (Central Asia Time)

Abay (Kazakh: Абай, Abai) or Imeni Abaya is a village in the Aktobe Region of western Kazakhstan.
