= Addis Ababa City F.C. =

Association football club in Ethiopia

Addis Ababa City
- Full name: Addis Ababa City Football Club
- Ground: Addis Ababa Stadium
- Capacity: 35,000
- Chairman: Netsanet Takele
- Manager: Ismail Abubeker
Home colours	Away colours

Addis Ababa City Football Club (Amharic: አዲስ አበባ ከተማ እግር ኳስ ክለብ) is an Ethiopian football club based in Addis Ababa.

They currently play in the Ethiopian Higher League, the 2nd tier of football in Ethiopia.

== History ==
The club was promoted to the Ethiopian Premier League, the top tier of football in Ethiopia, after the end of the 2015–16 season. However, the success was short lived as a poor 2016–17 campaign saw the club being relegated back to the Ethiopian Higher League.

== Ownership ==
The club is funded and run by the local city government.

== Controversy and disputes ==
During the 2016–17 season the club was accused of mistreatment after allegedly refusing to facilitate two Cameroon players way back to Cameroon after aborted trials.
