= Abai Village =

Abai Village 아바이마을
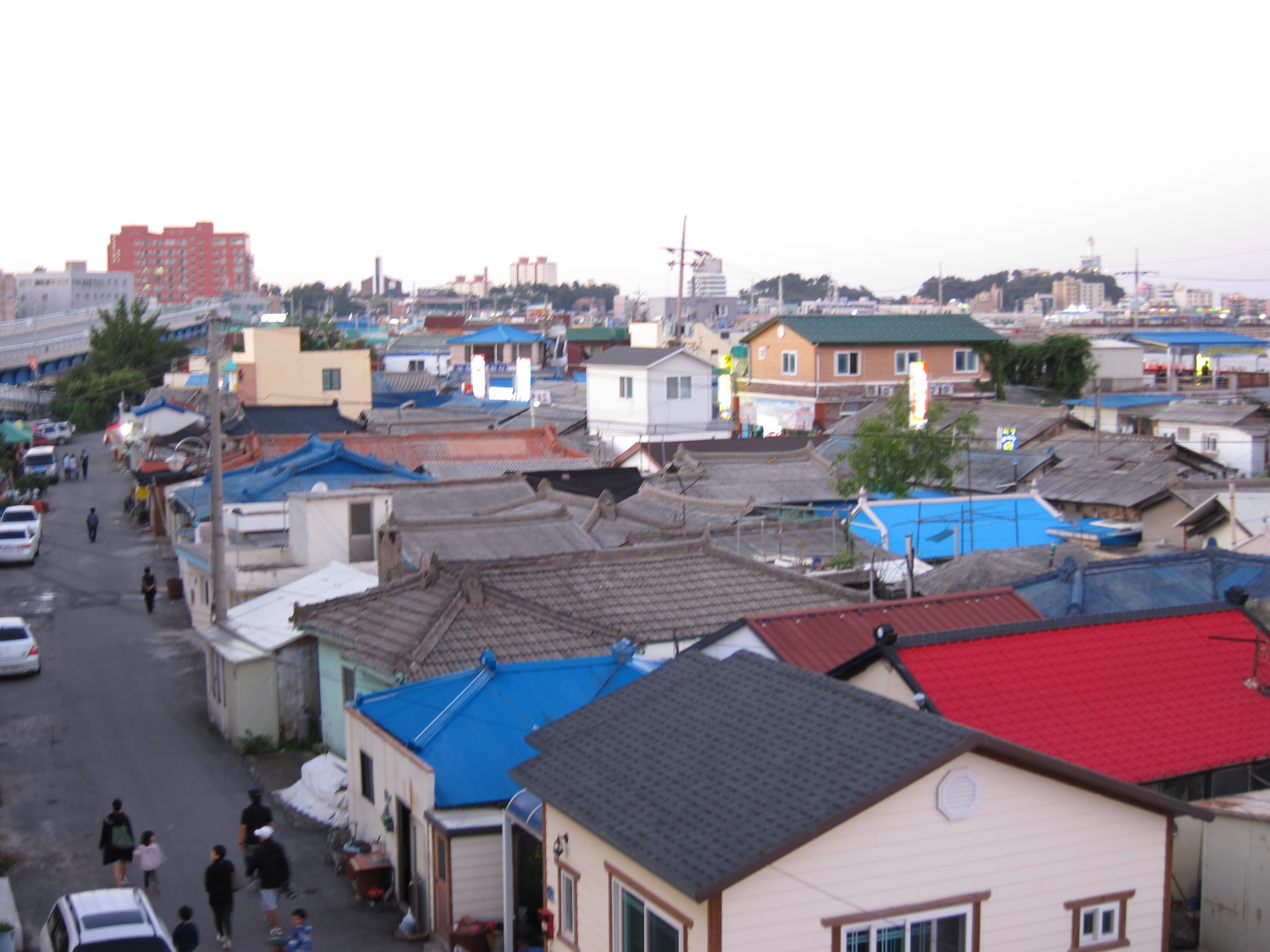
- Overview of the village (2010)

- Location in South Korea
- Coordinates: 38°12′25″N 128°35′31″E
- Country: South Korea
- Region: Gangwon-Do

Area
  - Total: 0.30 km^{2} (0.12 sq mi)

Population
  - Dialect: Hamgyŏng dialect

Abai Village (Korean: 아바이마을; RR: Abai-maeul) is a small village of North Korean refugees located in Cheongho-dong, Sokcho, Gangwon Province, South Korea. The residents of the village consist mainly of refugees originally hailing from Hamgyeong Province in North Korea who escaped south during the Korean War.

== History ==
In 1950, as the North Korean forces pushed Southward on their mission of unification they were joined by a force of 300,000 Chinese troops from the People's Volunteer Army. This influx of military force proved too much for the UN coalition forces and led to what is known as the 1.4 Retreat as they retreated to the Southeast to the Busan area. It was during this retreat that a group of around 6000 refugees from Hamgyeong Province in the Northeastern part of the country escaped south and set up shelters on a sandbar in Sokcho. Conditions upon their arrival were far from ideal, as the tides upon the sandbar would often leave parts of it incredibly muddy and cause water damage to the homes. Originally, the refugees intended to stay only temporarily and head back to their homes in Hamgyeong Province, but the outcome of the war made their stay much more permanent than expected. As the country was divided along the 38th Parallel, the residents of the village found themselves unable to return home. Most of the residents lived out the rest of their lives in the village or other parts of South Korea, but there have been a few that have applied for residency in the North so that they can return home.

== Lifestyle ==
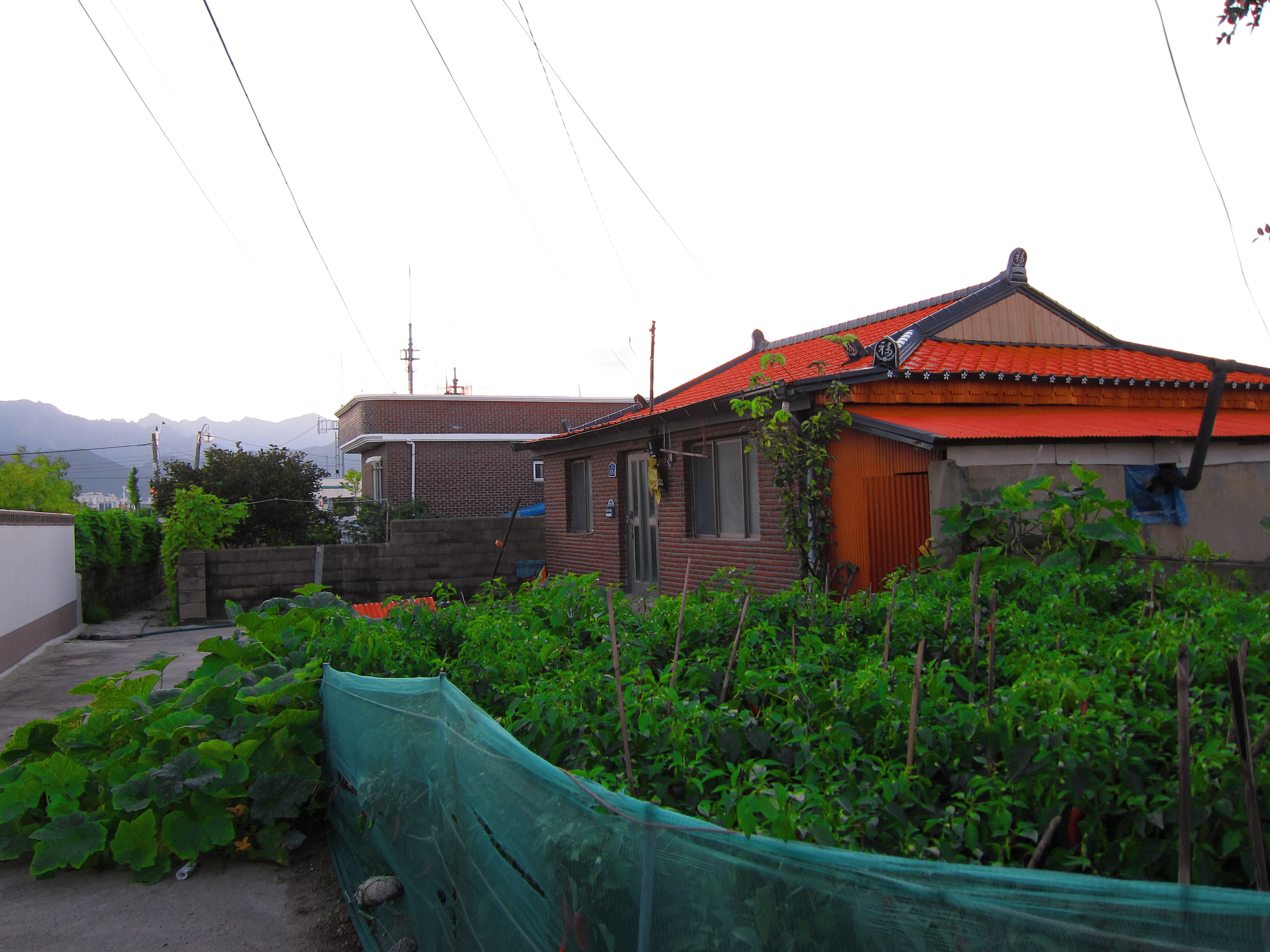
A home in the village with a garden (2010)

The name Abai (아바이) comes from the Hamgyeong Province dialect and means "Uncle" or "Aged Person". The nickname became attached to the village due to a large percentage of the refugees being of elderly age. The refugees in the village mainly subsisted on fishing in the Sea of Japan (East Sea), and the area continues to be known today for its seafood restaurants. Since the founding of the village, the population has slowly dwindled down to only a few hundred citizens as families have moved on to live in other urban centers throughout the country. Today the area is a cluster of small homes that haven't changed much since the war, and the seafood restaurants that are run by the fishing families that remain.

== Tourism ==
The village at night (2010)

Besides the fishing industry, Abai Village survives on income from tourists who come to the area to visit the village as well as hike the mountain Seoraksan. Since 2000, the area has seen increased tourism due to the popularity of the Korean Drama Autumn in My Heart on KBS. Many scenes featured the main character riding on the Gaetbae Boat (갯배), a floating raft of tires and wood pulled along a cable that served as the main way to get from the little island to downtown Sokcho until the recent completion of a bridge made driving a possibility.

The village also sees a fair number of tourists come through to try the famous Abai Sundae (아바이순대), which is a squid stuffed with a mixture of clear noodles, tofu, vegetables, and squid. Other popular dishes include the North Korean-style Naengmyeon (cold noodle dish).

Tourists interested in historical artifacts of the village visit to Sokcho City Museum (속초시립박물관), which contains replicas of the original homes that were set up by the refugees. These early huts were mostly made of scrap wood and metal, newspapers, and cardboard.
