= Harar Brewery =

Ethiopian brewery

Coordinates: 9°18′6.13″N 42°7′32.4″E

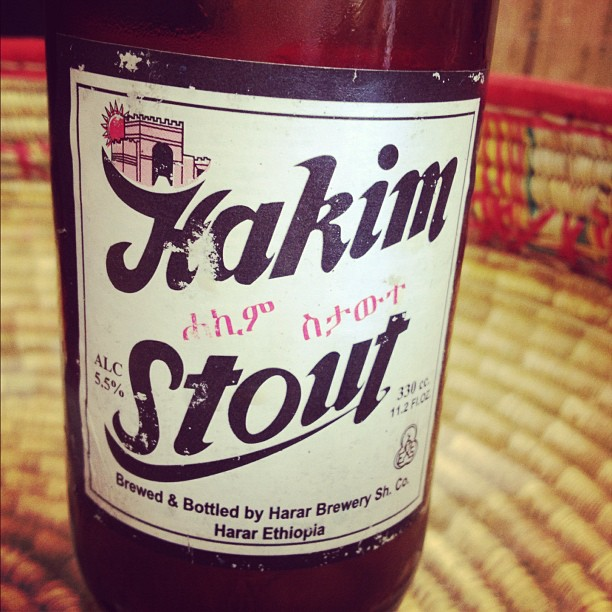
- Location: Harar, Ethiopia
- Opened: 1984; 41 years ago
- Annual production volume: Up to 250,000 hectolitres (210,000 US bbl)
- Owned by: Heineken N.V.

Active beers
Name	Type
Harar Beer	Pale lager
Hakim Stout	Stout
Harar Sofi	Non-alcoholic

Harar Brewery is a brewery in Harar, Ethiopia, owned by Heineken N.V. The brewery produces "Harar Beer", a 5% ABV pale lager and "Hakim Stout", a 5.5% ABV stout. The brewery also makes "Harar Sofi", a non-alcoholic beverage that it markets toward the Muslim population.

The brewery is capable of producing 500,000 hectolitres per year. The brewery uses water from the Genela spring, which is situated on its premises, supplementing with water that it pumps from Finkile, located 33 km from the facility.

In 2011, the state-owned Harar Brewery became a subsidiary of Heineken International through a US$78 million buyout.

== See also ==
- Harrar Beer Bottling F.C.
