= Southern Police =

Association football club in Ethiopia

- Full name: Southern Police
- Ground: Hawassa Kenema Stadium
- Capacity: 40,000
- Chairman: ?
- Manager: ?
- League: Ethiopian Premier League
- 2011/12: ?

Southern Police is an Ethiopian football club based in Sidama Zone in the Southern Nations, Nationalities, and Peoples' Region. The club played in the Ethiopian Premier League.

Currently the team play in Ethiopian Premier League.

== Stadium ==
Their home stadium is Hawassa Kenema Stadium in Hawassa. It has a capacity of 40,000.

== League participations ==
- Ethiopian Premier League: ?-2011
- Ethiopian Second Division: 2011–
