= Mohammed Hussein Ali Al-Amoudi Stadium =

Multi-purpose stadium in Weldiya, Amhara Region, Ethiopia

- Interactive map of Mohammed Hussein Ali Al-Amoudi Stadium
- Location: Weldiya, Amhara Region, Ethiopia
- Coordinates: 11.82993°N 39.60016°E
- Operator: Weldiya Municipality
- Capacity: 25,155
- Surface: Grass

Construction
- Built: 2017
- Opened: 14 January 2017
- Cost: $ 22 million

Tenants
- Woldia SC (2017–present); Woldia City (2017–present); Ethiopia national football team (selected matches)

Mohammed Hussein Ali Al-Amoudi Stadium (Amharic: ሼክ ሞሃመድ ሁሴን አልአሙዲ ስታዲየም) is a multi-purpose stadium in Weldiya, Amhara Region, Ethiopia with a capacity of 25,155. It has been the home of Woldia City and Woldia SC since its construction in 2017. The stadium is a part of a larger complex housing many other Athletic facilities.

== History ==
The construction of Woldia Stadium was started in 2010 through the collaboration of local residents and business tycoon Mohammed Al Amoudi. The construction was started with the hope of completion in 5 years. As of 2016, the final touches are being applied.

Inside of the stadium

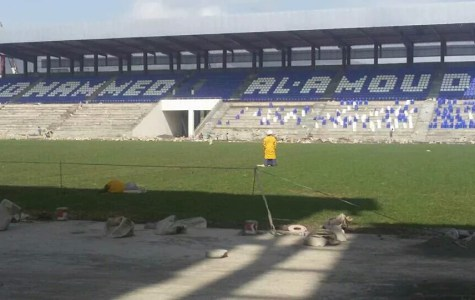
The inside of the Woldia Stadium during construction

With the completion of the Woldia Stadium, there is a new hope that Ethiopia will host continental competitions like the Africa Cup of Nations.

== Structures and Facilities ==
Excluding the main complex, the stadium has adjacent facilities including tennis courts, a basketball court, an Olympic size swimming pool, a volleyball field, a handball court and guest houses.
