= Batu City FC Ethiopia =

Association football club in Ethiopia

Batu Kenema F.C
- Full name: Batu Kenema Football Club
- Ground: Batu Town, Ethiopia
- League: Ethiopian Higher League
Home colours

Batu Kenema F.C (aka Batu Kenema) (Amharic:ባቱ ከተማ እግርኳስ ክለብ) an Ethiopian football club, in the city of Batu Town, East Shewa Zone, Oromia Region.
