= Ethiopian Higher League =

Ethiopian association football league

- Country: Ethiopia (32 teams)
- Confederation: CAF
- Number of clubs: 36
- Level on pyramid: 2
- Promotion to: Ethiopian Premier League
- Relegation to: Ethiopian First League
- Domestic cup(s): Ethiopian Cup; Ethiopian Super Cup
- Current champions: Sebeta City; Wolkite City; Hadiya Hossana FC (2020–21)
- Current: 2024–25 Ethiopian Higher League

The Ethiopian Higher League (Amharic: የኢትዮጵያ ከፍተኛ ሊግ), also called the Ethiopian Super League, is the second division of association football in Ethiopia. Regulated by the Ethiopian Football Federation, the league is divided into three groups (Group A, Group B, and Group C) with 12 clubs in each group. It operates on a system of promotion and relegation along with the Ethiopian Premier League (first division) and the Ethiopian First League (third division). The champions of Group A, B, and C will be automatically promoted to the Premier League. The bottom two teams (11th and 12th) of each respective group at the season's end will be relegated to the First League, the third division of Ethiopian football.

== History ==
After the 2016-17 season, Welwalo Adigrat University earned promotion to the Premier League by winning group A on 68 points with Mekelle City coming in second at 60 points. Jimma City won group B on 53 points and also earned promotion to the top league with Hadiya Hossana finishing second on 53 points. Mekelle City and Hadiya Hossana played in a one-game playoff to decide the third and final promotion out of the league, the game was won by Mekelle City (the club's first promotion into the Ethiopian Premier League).

The Ethiopian Football Federation (EFF) restructured the league into two groups A and B in the 2015/16 season. Group A comprises clubs from northern and central Ethiopia and Group B comprises clubs from Southern Ethiopia.

Fasil Kenema were crowned champions of the league after the 2015-16 season.

Bahir Dar Kenema and Debub Police S.C. were automatically promoted to the 2018-19 Ethiopian Premier League after winning their respective groups. Shire Endaselassie became the third and last club to be promoted to the 2018-19 Ethiopian Premier League after beating Jimma Aba Buna in a playoff match in Hawassa.

During the 2020-21 season, some team were for forced to forfeit their matches due to unpaid payments to the league.

== Teams ==
=== 2020–21 season ===
The following 32 clubs will compete in the Higher League during the 2020-21 season.

Group A (የምድብ ሀ)

- Woldia
- Ethio Electric
- Legetafo Legedadi
- Dessie City
- Semien Shewa Debre Birhan
- Gelan City
- Federal Police
- Dessie City
- Wollo Kombolcha

Group B (የምድብ ለ)

- Defence (Mekelakeya)
- Akaki Kality
- ECWCE
- Kafa Bunna
- Bench Maji Bunna
- Shashemene City
- Jimma Aba Bunna
- Halaba City
- Sodo City
- Hambericho Durame
- Addis Ababa City
- Nekemte City
- Gamo Chencha

Group C (የምድብ ሐ)

- Arba Minch City
- Kolfie Keranio
- Negelle Arsi
- Yeka (Addis Abeba)
- Ethiopia Medin
- Kembata Shinshicho
- Siltie Worabe
- Butajira City
- Debub Police
- Batu City
- Yirgachefe Buna
- St. Kirkos (Addis Abeba)

== 2020–21 clubs' stadiums ==
Clubs with stadiums with a capacity of at least 10,000:

Team	Location	Stadium	Capacity
Addis Ababa City F.C.	Addis Ababa	Addis Ababa Stadium	35,000
Defence Force S.C.	Addis Ababa	Addis Ababa Stadium	35,000
Ethiopian Insurance F.C.	Addis Ababa	Addis Ababa Stadium	35,000
Woldia S.C.	Weldiya	Woldiya Stadium	25,155
Jimma Aba Buna S.C.	Jimma	Jimma Stadium	15,000
Debub Police S.C.	Awassa	Awassa Stadium	15,000
