= Shy Abady =

Israeli artist (born 1965)

- שי עבאדי
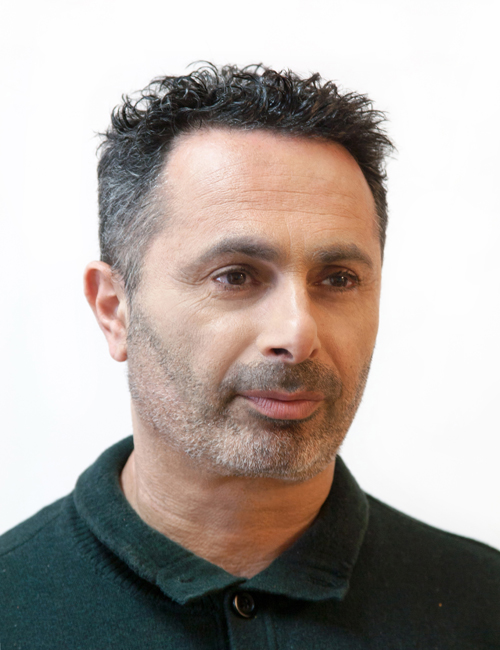
- Born: 24 September 1965 (age 61)
- Citizenship: Israel
- Education: Tel Aviv University (Master's Degree)
- Occupation: Artist
- Website: https://shyabady.net/en/

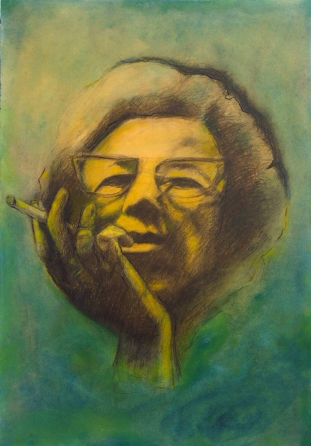
Smoke, 2004, mixed media on paper, on wood, 49.5x34.5 cm, from the series, "Hannah Arendt Project"

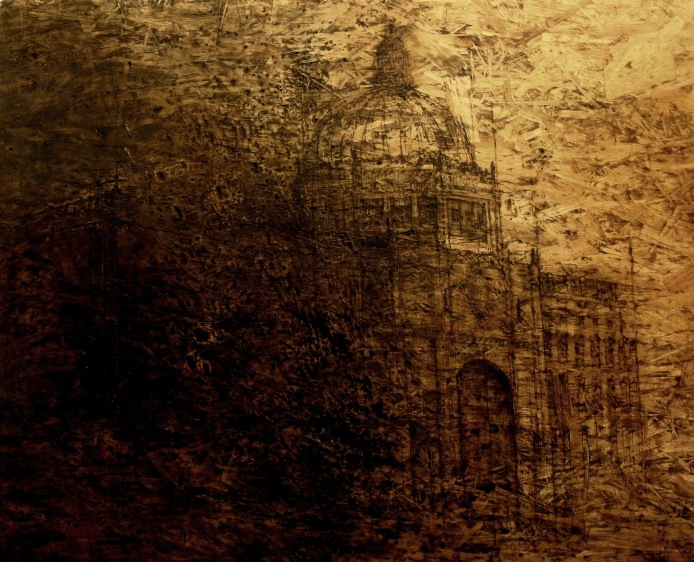
The Palace (after the Berliner Stadtschloss), 2008, electric etching on OSB plate, 98 × 119 cm, from the series, "My Other Germany"

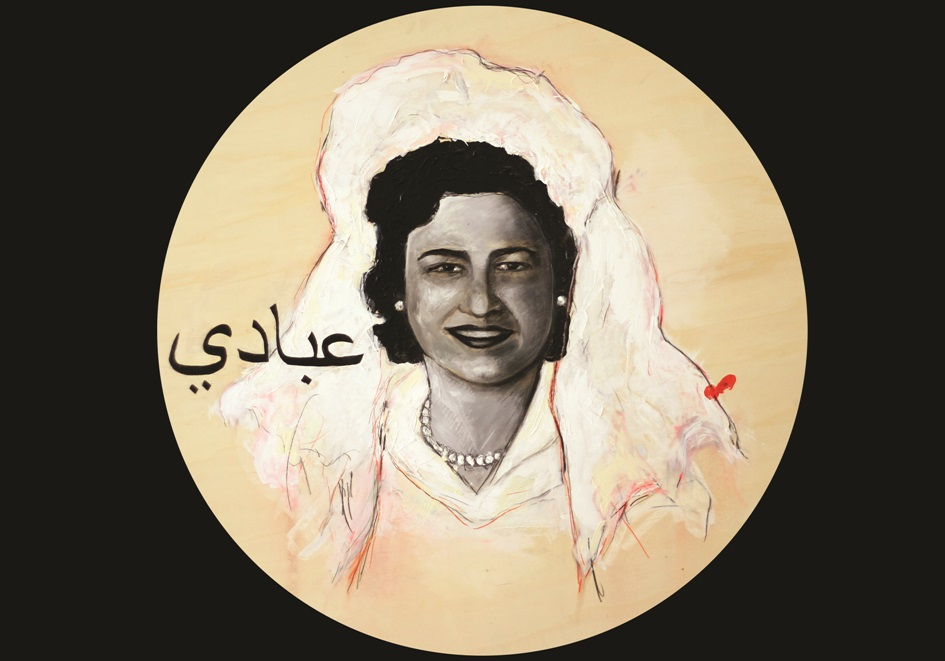
The Syrian Bride (Mother), 2016, mixed media on plywood, Ø 110cm, from the series, "Back to the Levant"

Shy Abady (Hebrew: שי עבאדי; born 24 September 1965 in Jerusalem) is an Israeli artist. Over the years, Abady created "biographical" series, which followed individual figures (including, Nijinsky, Hannah Arendt and Radu Klapper, Paul Celan).

== Education ==
Shy Abady began studying painting at a young age at the studio of Ascher Rudnizcki. Later he participated in a drawing course at the "Bezalel Academy" taught by Joram Rozov. In 1992 he graduated from "Hamidrasha art college". Between the years 2012–2014, Abady completed his master's degree in History of Arts at the Faculty of Arts, Tel Aviv University.

== Career ==
In 1995, presented Abady his first solo exhibition, "From Reality to Myth – Nijinsky," which followed the life and the image of the Russian dancer and choreographer, Vaslav Nijinsky.

In 2000 Abady received a residency scholarship at "The Cité" in Paris. There he created the series, "Icon – The Golden Age," which applied Christian iconographic technique to Jewish–Israeli figures.

Other series addressed historical-political themes (Including, "My Other Germany", "Augusta Victoria", "Back to the Levant" and "A Boomerang on Breath-Routes").In some other series, (" Icon – the Golden Age", "Marcuse, Pontormo and Me"), Abady examines the language of art itself and the aesthetic influences and relationships between Western-Christian art and Jewish-Israeli art. Abady's work has been shown in solo and group exhibitions in many galleries and museums in Israel and abroad.

Abady exhibited his series the "Hannah Arendt Project" in 2005 at the Jewish Museum of Frankfurt and other places. In 2010, seven works from the series were presented at Beth Hatefutsoth museum in Tel Aviv in the exhibition, "Jewish Icons – Andy Warhol and Israeli artists". In 2006 Abady began working on "Radu," a series that concerns the late Israeli-Romanian poet and writer Radu Klapper.The series was presented in January 2012 in "Zadik Gallery" in Jaffa.

Between the years 2007– 2008, Abady lived in Berlin and created the series "My Other Germany", The artist tells his story of German and German-Jewish history and myth. The series casts eighteenth- and nineteenth-century German statues and monuments (mostly from Berlin) as an allegory of twentieth-century events. In 2014 five works from the series were presented in Herzliya Museum of Contemporary Art in the exhibition "Back to Berlin".

In 2009, Abady exhibited "The Revolution that Danced," an homage to Nijinsky's and Sergei Diaghilev's Ballets Russes on the occasion of the 100th anniversary of their first performance in Paris, presented at the Tel Aviv Performing Arts Center.

In 2010, Abady began to work on the series "Augusta Victoria," which continues his Berlin series with a local Israeli perspective. The series explores the dialogues between Theodor Herzl, the visionary of the Jewish state, and Kaiser Wilhelm II, the last German Kaiser. The series was first presented in February 2012 in the "Dan Gallery" in Tel Aviv. In 2014 a portrait of the Kaiser Wilhelm II from the series, as well as two other portraits from the "Hannah Arendt Project", were presented in the Hungarian National Gallery in Budapest as part of an international group exhibition, "Turning Points". The exhibition dealt with the reaction of various contemporary artists to major twentieth-century events like World Wars I and II.

Between the years 2012 – 2016, Abady created the series " Marcuse, Pontormo and Me". The series conducts a dialogue with two artists and their creation, one is the 19th century Jewish-German artist Elie Marcuse and his epic biblical painting "The Death of King Saul on the Gilboa", and the second is the 16th-century Italian Mannerist painter Jacopo Pontormo. The series isolates pieces from their works and sets the stage for a material and conceptual dialogue between them. Through the works of the two, the series explores the complex relationship between the Christian-Western art tradition and the Jewish-Israeli one. The series offers a meditation on the way Jewish-Israeli art could have developed sensually and aesthetically, if it had engaged more closely with Christian-Western art. in December 2022 the serie was presented at Hamidrasha Gallery-Hayarkon 19 by the curation of Avi Lubin.

In 2016, years after dealing with "Western European" issues, Abady began creating the series "Back to the Levant," a series which deals with the Levantine space and its history. The series opens a conversation between the complex and sensitive regional history and the personal family history of the artist. The series blends the personal with the public and the political, blurring the boundaries between Jewish and Arab identities. Abady paints portraits of Arab political figures from the Middle East who are perceived by the Israeli eye as hostile figures (such as Gamal Abdel Nasser and Haj Amin al-Husseini) alongside his family, all of whom were born in the region and lived for many years among Arabs in Jerusalem, Aleppo, and Cairo . In addition, alongside the Arabic inscription, the series also depicts sites of sacred places (such as the Dome of the Rock and tombs of Jewish and Muslim righteous). For the artist, the Levant is an open space of mixed identities bridging and contrasting East and West. In November 2024, the series "Back to the Levant" was presented at the Umm al-Fahm Art Gallery, which had just turned to the first contemoperry Palestinian art museum in Israel. Tali Tamir, a leading Israeli curator, curated the exhibit.

In 2017, the exhibition " The Restless" by Abady was presented at the "Schechter Gallery" in Neve Schechter in Tel Aviv. The exhibition featured portraits from various series he created over the years, including portraits from the series "Marcuse, Pontormo and Me" and "Back to the Levant". The exhibition has gained wide exposure in Israel.

In 2018, Abady began to create the series "The Burning Heat and the Donkey's Scream", dedicated to the historical visit of the Jewish poet, Paul Celan, to Israel (October 1969). The series is part of a joint initiative of Tel Aviv University and Stanford University to mark the 50th anniversary of Celan's visit. In the series, Abady integrates the image, poetry, and dramatic life of Celan with the poet's experience in East Jerusalem. Abady collects words and phrases from the poem, "The Burning Heat", which is part of the Jerusalem song cycle written by Celan in conjunction to his visit, ("The burning heat / counts us together / in the ass's braying, before Absalom's tomb…"). The works include words and captions in Arabic and other languages as well as images of historic sites in East Jerusalem. In addition, playing role in the series the donkey images, portraits of Celan and Ilana Shmueli his Chernivtsi youth friend who accompanied him while he was traveling in Israel and more. Abady chooses to emphasize the Levantine / Arab side of the visit of Celan, a side that was not expressed in Celan's poems nor in the references to his visit over the years. The Celan series links Abady's previous series, including, his German–Jewish series ("The Arendt Project," "My Other Germany," "Augusta Victoria") and the more recent series, "Back to the Levant". In June 2022, 9 artworks from the series "Paul Celan, The Burning Heat and the Donkey's Scream", were presented in the exhibition "Paul Celan/69/A Visit", at the Nahum Gutman Museum of Art in Tel Aviv.

In April 2021, five more works from the series "Back to the Levant" were presented in the "Sabra" exhibition at the Schechter Gallery. The works examine the "sabra" myth that Jews and Arabs in Israel share. Abady used the images of the heroes of the canonical Israeli film "He Walked Through the Fields" (1967), Uri and Mika (played by Assi Dayan, who is image identified as the typical Israeli Sabra and Iris Yotvat), and disrupted the familiar iconic array of their identities using gilded backgrounds, Hebrew and Arabic captions and more.

In 2023, Abady began creating the series, "A Boomerang on the Breath-Routes" which continues in some ways his series "My Other Germany". The new series opens a dialogue between the German-Jewish history and Israeli existence. This time through Walter Benjamin's founding text: "The Angel of History" (Angelus Novus)". The series blends past and present and brings up Jewish-German and Israeli characters, Hanna Arendt, Walter Benjamin, Paul Celan, Yaakov Shabtai, Gal Gadot, and Kochva Levi (Savoy Hotel attack), who embody an element of catastrophe and strength, chaos and hope. Next to them appear imaginary sites and symbols with historically laden such as the “Reichsadler” and the “Star of David”. The series is an expression of the Israeli reality which has become chaotic in 2023 and the sense of tension and danger in the air which has become thick. In March 2024 (after being postponed due to the 2023 Hamas-led attack on Israel), the series was presented at the Beita Jerusalem gallery.

== Personal life ==
Abady is gay and is in a relationship with Shy Lavi.

== Solo exhibitions ==
- 1995 – From Reality to Myth Nijinsky, Beit Ariela, Tel Aviv.
- 1998 – Caressing, Beit-Haam Gallery, Tel Aviv.
- 1998 – Anatomy of Myth, Jerusalem Theater.
- 1999 – For Your Feet Only, The Artists' Residence, Herzliya.
- 2005 – Hannah Arendt Project, Jewish Museum Frankfurt am Main.
- 2006 – Hannah Arendt Project, Heinrich Boell Foundation Gallery, Bremen.
- 2006 – Hannah Arendt Project, Hannah Arendt Zentrum, Oldenburg.
- 2006 – Icon – The Golden Age, The Artists' House, Tel-Aviv.
- 2006 – Hannah Arendt Project, Jerusalem Artists' House.
- 2009 – The revolution that danced, Tel Aviv Performing Arts Center.
- 2012 – Radu, Zadik Gallery, Jaffa.
- 2012 – Augusta Victoria, Dan Gallery, Tel-Aviv.
- 2017 – The Restless, Schechter Gallery, Neve Schechter, Tel-Aviv.
- 2021 – Sabra, Schechter Gallery, Tel-Aviv
- 2022 – Marcuse, Pontormo and Me, Hamidrasha Gallery-Hayarkon 19, Tel-Aviv
- 2024 – A Boomerang on Breath-Routes, Beita Jerusalem Gallery, Jerusalem
- 2024 – Back to the Levant, Umm al-Fahm Art Gallery, Umm al-Fahm

== Selected group exhibitions ==
2001 – Traces, Biennale for contemporary drawing in Israel, Jerusalem Artists' House. 2004 – Tel Aviv Profile, City Hall building, Tel Aviv. 2008 – Beware the aftereffects, Infernoesque, Berlin. 2009 – Groom and Bride, The Jaffa Museum. 2010 – Jewish Icons, Andy Warhol and Israeli artists, Beth Hatefutsoth museum, Tel Aviv. 2011 – Appropriated Place, Zadik Gallery, Jaffa. 2012 – On A Small Scale, Zadik Gallery, Jaffa. 2013 – Fans, Zadik Gallery, Jaffa. 2014 – Money, Zadik Gallery, Jaffa. 2014 – The Benevolent Tree, Umm el-Fahem art Gallery. 2014 – Back to Berlin, Herzliya Museum of Contemporary Art. 2014 – Turning Points, "Hungarian National Gallery", Budapest. 2015 – Libra, Neve Schechter gallery, Tel Aviv. 2015 – On the Face, Zadik gallery, Jaffa. 2016 – Black Box, outdoor exhibition, Jerusalem. 2017 – Homelands, The Jerusalem Biennale, Bezeq House. 2018 – Shortly Back, Zadik gallery, Jaffa. 2019 – Jacqueline Kahanoff: The Levant as a Parable, Eretz Israel Museum, Tel Aviv. 2019 – In The East, Cymbalista Synagogue and Jewish Heritage Center, Tel Aviv University. 2019 – In The East: Spain and Jerusalem, Dwek Gallery Mishkenot Sha'ananim, Jerusalem. 2019 – TL;DR-The Exhibitions That Won't Be, Zadik Gallery, Jaffa. 2022 – Paul Celan/69/A Visit, Nahum Gutman Museum of Art.
