= Abay (name) =

Abay is both a surname and a given name. Notable people with the name include:

== Surname ==
- Aydo Abay (born 1973), German singer and songwriter of Turkish descent
- Burak Abay (born 1996), Turkish cyclist
- Dong Abay (born 1971), Filipino musician
- Korhan Abay (born 1954), Turkish actor
- Oszkár Abay-Nemes (1913–1959), Hungarian swimmer
- Péter Abay (born 1962), Hungarian fencer
- Yordanos Abay (born 1984), Ethiopian footballer

== Given name ==
- Abay Bokoleyev (born 1996), Kyrgyz footballer
- Abay Qunanbayuli (1845–1904), Kazakh poet
- Abay Tsehaye (1953–2021), Ethiopian politician
- Abay Weldu (born 1965), Ethiopian politician
