= Metehara Sugar =

Association football club in Ethiopia

- Full name: Metehara Sugar
- Nickname: Metehara Seqwar
- Ground: Wonji Stadium, Addis Ketema, Ethiopia
- Capacity: 14,000
- League: Ethiopian Premier League
Home colours	Away colours

Metehara Sugar (a.k.a. Metehara Seqwar) is an Ethiopian football club, in the town of Addis Ketema, Oromia Region. Despite their name, they are not based in Metehara, nor do they have any current affiliation with the sugar mill. They play in the Ethiopian Premier League, the top level of professional football in Ethiopia.
