= Tikur Abay Transport =

Association football club in Ethiopia

- Full name: Tikur Abay Transport Sport Club
- Ground: Dessie, Ethiopia
- League: Ethiopian Premier League
Home colours	Away colours

Tikur Abay Transport is an Ethiopian football club, in the city of Dessie, Amhara Region. They play in the Ethiopian Premier League, the top level of professional football in Ethiopia.
