= Ethiopian Football Federation =

Governing body of association football in Ethiopia

CAF
- Founded: 1943
- FIFA affiliation: 1952
- CAF affiliation: 1957
- President: Esayas Jira
- Website: theeff.org/en/

The Ethiopian Football Federation (EFF) (Amharic: የኢትዮጵያ እግር ኳስ ፌዴሬሽን) is the governing body of football in Ethiopia. It organizes all tiers of the national football league and the national team. It was one of the founding members of the Confederation of African Football (CAF).

== History ==
The Ethiopian Football Federation was founded in 1943 and became affiliated with FIFA in 1952. In 1957 the EFF along with its Egyptian, Sudanese, and South African counterparts founded CAF.

In October 2013, the federation elected Juneidi Basha as its new president to replace Sahilu Gebrewold. Beating out three other candidates, Basha received the majority of votes (55 of the 101 votes) at the Federation's General assembly. Juneydi Basha, represented the eastern region of Dire Dawa, was a businessman before becoming football federation president.

In June 2018 the EFF elected Esayas Jira as president. The 46 year old Jira, who was backed as the candidate from the Oromia region, won 87 of 145 votes by the general assembly which had taken place in Semera, Ethiopia. In April 2021, the federation announced it had renewed its contract with British sportswear maker Umbro, extending the agreement another four years.

== Domestic Competition ==
The EFF was responsible for all regulatory processes of all professional football leagues in Ethiopia including the Ethiopian Premier League, the Ethiopian Higher League (second tier) and the Ethiopian First League (third tier). The federation also runs the Ethiopian Women's Premier League along with the second tier of the Women's professional football league.

=== Men's Football ===
In May 2018, the Ethiopian Premier League was suspended indefinitely after a referee was attacked during a match between Welwalo Adigrat University F.C. and Defense Force S.C. This coming on the heels of a similar incident a month earlier in which spectators swarmed onto a football field during a match between Woldia S.C. and Fasil Kenema F.C., injuring two match officials and a coach.

=== Women's Football ===
Women's football has gained more popularity in recent years in Ethiopia with the Ethiopian national team having only made its debut in September 2002 in the 2002 African Championship's qualifiers. Soon after this the first professional Women's football league, the Ethiopian Women's Premier League, was established.

== Continental Competition ==
Ethiopia participated in the inaugural African Cup of Nations in 1957 hosted by Sudan, eventually losing 4–0 in the final to Egypt. In the 1959 edition of the tournament they finished third behind both Sudan and eventual champions Egypt. Ethiopia hosted and won the 1962 edition of the African Cup of Nations beating Egypt in the final 4–2.

In the qualification for the 2013 Africa Cup of Nations, Ethiopia was able to defeat both Benin and Sudan in home and away fixtures to qualify for the tournament. This was the first time that Ethiopia had qualified for the Africa Cup of Nations in 31 years.

== Relationship with FIFA ==
In January 2008, dissatisfied with the "dismal" record of Ethiopian football, the General Assembly fired Dr. Ashebir Woldegiorgis, the head of the EFF, who refused to step down. However, the next month both the EFF and the CAF announced that they did not recognize Dr. Ashebir's dismissal. Despite this, the EFF membership refused to allow Dr. Ashebir access to his office. The standoff continued over the following months, which led to the FIFA suspending their membership 29 July 2008. As a result, the Ethiopia-Morocco match scheduled for 5–7 September was canceled, and Ethiopia kicked out of the qualifying campaign for the 2010 FIFA World Cup in South Africa. This crisis came to an end 16 May 2009, when Dr. Ashebir announced he would resign.

Following elections for a new president 18 July, in which Sahlu Gebrewold Gebremariam became president, a three-man delegation from FIFA said that they were "satisfied with the result" and handed a FIFA flag to the new president as a token that the EFF had been readmitted to that body. Sahlu afterwards announced his priority as president was to heal the rift in the country over this sport, and to "facilitate a renaissance in Ethiopian football."

== Past Presidents ==
- Juneidi Basha (2013–18)
- Dr. Ashebir Woldegiorgis
- Sahlu Gebrewold Gebremariam

== Competitions ==
The EFF also runs other competitions:

- Ethiopian Cup
- Ethiopian Super Cup

== National teams ==
=== Men's teams ===
- Ethiopia national football team
- Ethiopia national under-17 football team
- Ethiopia national under-20 football team
- Ethiopia national under-23 football team

=== Women's teams ===
- Ethiopia women's national football team
- Ethiopia women's national under-20 football team
- Ethiopia women's national under-17 football team

== See also ==
- Ethiopian Premier League
- List of football clubs in Ethiopia
