= 2021 Moçambola =

Moçambola
- Season: 2021
- Champions: Associação Black Bulls
- Relegated: Second division
- Champions League: champiom
- Confederation Cup: runner-up
- Goals: 175
- Top goalscorer: Ejaita with 15
- Longest winning run: ENH Vilankulo 4-1 Ferroviário Nacala
- Longest unbeaten run: Associação Black Bulls
- Longest winless run: Matchedje Maputo
- Longest losing run: ENH Vilankulo 4-1 Ferroviário Nacala
- All statistics correct as of 10/07/21.

The 2021 Moçambola is the 43rd season of Moçambola, the top-tier football league in Mozambique. The 2021 season started on January 16, 2021.

ENH changed name to Associação Desportiva Vilanculo during the season.

After the 4th round, due to the worsening of the COVID-19 pandemic in the country, the competition was stopped and postponed for three months.

The Associação Black Bulls won the 2021 Moçambola

== Participating Clubs ==
Club	City	Province	Stadium	Capacity
Clube Ferroviário de Nampula	Nampula	Nampula	Estádio 25 de Junho	4,000
Clube Ferroviário de Nacala	Nacala	Nampula	Estádio do Nacala Velha	5,000
CF Lichinga	Lichinga	Niassa	Estádio Municipal 1º de Maio de Lichinga	20,000
UD Songo	Songo	Tete	Estadio da HCB	2,000
CD Matchedje de Maputo	Mocuba	Zambézia	Estádio da Machava	60,000
GDR Textáfrica	Chimoio	Manica	Campo da Soalpo	5,000
Clube Ferroviário da Beira	Beira	Sofala	Estádio do Ferroviário	7,000
ENH/AD Vilankulo	Vilankulo	Inhambane	Estádio Municipal de Vilankulo	5,000
Liga Desportiva de Maputo	Maputo	Maputo	Estádio Da Liga Muçulmana	5,000
Clube Ferroviário de Maputo	Maputo	Maputo	Estádio da Machava	60,000
CD Costa do Sol	Maputo	Maputo	Estádio do Costa do Sol	10,000
Grupo Desportivo de Maputo	Maputo	Maputo	Estádio do Zimpeto	42,000
Associação Black Bulls	Maputo	Maputo	Estádio da Matola	5,000
GD Incomáti	Xinavane	Maputo	Campo de Xinavane	2,500

== Matches ==
=== Round 1 ===
[Jan 16]

. AD Vilankulo 4-1 CF Nacala

[Jan 17]

. CF Maputo 0-0 UD Songo

Matchedje Mocuba 2-2 GD Maputo

. CF Nampula 1-2 ABB

Incomáti Xinavane 3-0 Textáfrica

. CF Beira 3-1 CD Costa do Sol

          LD  Maputo 1-2 CF Lichinga৳

=== Round 2 ===
[Jan 23]

Desportivo Maputo 0-3 Ferroviário Maputo

[Jan 24]

Black Bulls 2-0 ENH Vilankulo

UD Songo 2-1 Liga Desportiva Maputo

Ferroviário Nacala 1-0 Matchedje Mocuba

Textáfrica 0-1 Ferroviário Nampula

Costa do Sol 2-1 Incomáti Xinavane

Ferroviário Lichinga 1-2 Ferroviário Beira

=== Round 3 ===
[Jan 30]

Ferroviário Maputo 0-0 Ferroviário Nacala

ENH Vilankulo 3-0 Textáfrica

[Jan 31]

UD Songo 2-2 Desportivo Maputo

Matchedje Mocuba 1-2 Black Bulls

Ferroviário Nampula 0-1 Costa do Sol

Incomáti Xinavane 3-0 Ferroviário Lichinga

Liga Desportiva Maputo 2-1 Ferroviário Beira

=== Round 4 ===
[Feb 6]

Desportivo Maputo 0-0 Liga Desportiva Maputo

Black Bulls 1-1 Ferroviário Maputo

[Feb 7]

Ferroviário Lichinga 2-0 Ferroviário Nampula

Ferroviário Beira 3-0 Incomáti Xinavane

Ferroviário Nacala 2-3 UD Songo

Textáfrica 1-0 Matchedje Mocuba

Costa do Sol 0-1 ENH Vilankulo

=== Round 5 ===
[May 8]

Liga Desportiva Maputo 1-0 Incomáti Xinavane

Ferroviário Maputo 3-0 Textáfrica

Matchedje Mocuba 0-0 Costa do Sol

[May 9]

UD Songo 1-4 Black Bulls

Desportivo Maputo 1-1 Ferroviário Nacala

ENH Vilankulo 2-1 Ferroviário Lichinga

Ferroviário Nampula 1-2 Ferroviário Beira

=== Round 6 ===
[May 15]

Black Bulls 3-0 Desportivo Maputo

[May 16]

Costa do Sol 1-2 Ferroviário Maputo

Ferroviário Nacala 1-0 Liga Desportiva Maputo

Textáfrica 1-1 UD Songo

Ferroviário Lichinga 4-0 Matchedje Mocuba

Ferroviário Beira 3-1 ENH Vilankulo

Incomáti Xinavane 1-0 Ferroviário Nampula

=== Round 7 ===
[May 21]

Ferroviário Maputo 1-0 Ferroviário Lichinga

[May 22]

UD Songo 1-0 Costa do Sol

Desportivo Maputo 2-1 Textáfrica

ENH Vilankulo 0-0 Incomáti Xinavane

[May 23]

Liga Desportiva Maputo 3-0 Ferroviário Nampula

Matchedje Mocuba 0-1 Ferroviário Beira

Ferroviário Nacala 0-3 Black Bulls

=== Round 8 ===
[May 28]

Ferroviário Lichinga 1-0 UD Songo

[May 29]

Costa do Sol 2-0 Desportivo Maputo

[May 30]

Black Bulls 2-1 Liga Desportiva Maputo

Textáfrica 0-0 Ferroviário Nacala

Ferroviário Beira 0-1 Ferroviário Maputo

Incomáti Xinavane 1-1 Matchedje Mocuba

Ferroviário Nampula 0-0 ENH Vilankulo

=== Round 9 ===
[Jun 12]

Black Bulls 4-0 Textáfrica

[Jun 13]

Liga Desportiva Maputo 2-2 ENH Vilankulo

Matchedje Mocuba 0-1 Ferroviário Nampula

Ferroviário Maputo 2-0 Incomáti Xinavane

UD Songo 0-0 Ferroviário Beira

Desportivo Maputo 0-2 Ferroviário Lichinga

Ferroviário Nacala 1-3 Costa do Sol

=== Round 10 ===
[Jun 18]

Ferroviário Lichinga 2-0 Ferroviário Nacala

[Jun 20]

Costa do Sol 2-2 Black Bulls

Ferroviário Beira 1-0 Desportivo Maputo

Incomáti Xinavane 1-2 UD Songo

Ferroviário Nampula 1-0 Ferroviário Maputo

ENH Vilankulo 2-2 Matchedje Mocuba

Textáfrica 1-1 Liga Desportiva Maputo

NB: ENH changed name to Associação Desportiva Vilanculo

=== Round 11 ===
[Jun 26]

Ferroviário Maputo 1-1 AD Vilankulo

Desportivo Maputo 1-1 Incomáti Xinavane

[Jun 27]

Liga Desportiva Maputo 2-1 Matchedje Mocuba

UD Songo 1-0 Ferroviário Nampula

Ferroviário Nacala 0-3 Ferroviário Beira

Black Bulls 4-1 Ferroviário Lichinga

Textáfrica 0-0 Costa do Sol

=== Round 12 ===
[Jul 11]

Liga Desportiva Maputo - Costa do Sol

Ferroviário Lichinga - Textáfrica

Ferroviário Beira - Black Bulls

Incomáti Xinavane - Ferroviário Nacala

Ferroviário Nampula - Desportivo Maputo

AD Vilankulo - UD Songo

Matchedje Mocuba - Ferroviário Maputo

=== Round 13 ===
[Jul 18]

Ferroviário Maputo - Liga Desportiva Maputo

UD Songo - Matchedje Mocuba

Desportivo Maputo - AD Vilankulo

Ferroviário Nacala - Ferroviário Nampula

Black Bulls - Incomáti Xinavane

Textáfrica - Ferroviário Beira

Costa do Sol - Ferroviário Lichinga
