= 2023 Moçambola =

Moçambola
- Season: 2023
- Champions: Ferroviário Beira
- Matches played: 132
- Goals scored: 271 (2.05 per match)
- Top goalscorer: Dayo António (UD Songo, 12 goals)

The 2023 Moçambola was the 45th season of Moçambola, the top-flight football season in Mozambique.

Ferroviário Beira won their second-ever Moçambola title on the last day of the season after defeating Vilankulos 1–0. Coach Hélder Duarte also won his second title after winning with Black Bulls in 2021.

== Changes ==
Ferroviário Quelimane were promoted from the second division, along with Matchedje of Maputo and Baía de Pemba.

== League Table ==
Pos	Team	Pld	W	D	L	GF	GA	GD	Pts	Qualification or relegation
1	Ferroviário Beira (C)	22	11	6	5	27	18	+9	39	Champions, Qualification to the 2024–25 CAF Champions League
2	Black Bulls	22	11	5	6	30	18	+12	38	
3	Ferroviário Nampula	22	11	3	8	24	21	+3	36	
4	Costa do Sol	22	10	6	6	33	22	+11	36	
5	UD Songo	22	10	5	7	28	17	+11	35	
6	Baía de Pemba	22	8	9	5	20	18	+2	33	
7	Ferroviário de Lichinga	22	8	8	6	20	21	−1	32	
8	Ferroviário Maputo	22	8	5	9	23	20	+3	29	
9	Vilankulo F.C.	22	7	7	8	14	17	−3	28	
10	Ferroviário Nacala (R)	22	7	4	11	21	32	−11	25	Relegation
11	Clube Ferroviário de Quelimane (R)	22	5	5	12	15	27	−12	20	Relegation
12	Matchedje (Maputo) (R)	22	1	7	14	16	40	−24	10	Relegation

Rules for classification: 1) points; 2) goal difference; 3) number of goals scored.
(C) Champions; (R) Relegated

== Attendances ==
#	Football club	Average attendance
1	Ferroviário de Lichinga	3,118
2	Ferroviário da Beira	2,043
3	Ferroviário de Nacala	1,488
4	Ferroviário de Nampula	1,022
5	UD Songo	994
6	Ferroviário de Quelimane	860
7	Baía de Pemba FC	820
8	CD Matchedje de Maputo	688
9	Vilankulo FC	292
10	CD Costa do Sol	215
11	Associação Black Bulls	205
12	Ferroviário de Maputo	204
