= 2019 Moçambola =

Moçambola
- Season: 2019

The 2019 Moçambola is the 42nd season of Moçambola, the top-tier football league in Mozambique. The season was supposed to start on 30 March 2019, but was delayed to 27 April due to the damage caused by Cyclone Idai.

Due to financial problems, the teams were initially divided into two groups for this season. However, the decision was later revoked on 12 April.

== League table ==
Pos	Team	Pld	W	D	L	GF	GA	GD	Pts	Qualification or relegation
1	Costa do Sol (C)	30	20	6	4	56	25	+31	66	Qualification for 2020–21 CAF Champions League
2	Songo (Q)	30	19	3	8	47	29	+18	60	Qualification for 2020–21 CAF Confederation Cup (Note: Songo are Taça de Moçambique winners.)
3	Ferroviário de Maputo	30	13	9	8	34	22	+12	48	
4	Ferroviário da Beira	30	12	9	9	34	25	+9	45	
5	Ferroviário de Nacala	30	12	5	13	28	31	−3	41 (Note: Head-to-head Pts (GF–GA): Ferroviário de Nacala 3 (2–1), ENH 3 (1–2).)	
6	ENH	30	10	11	9	29	30	−1	41	
7	Incomáti	30	10	10	10	29	31	−2	40 (Note: Head-to-head Pts (GF–GA): Incomáti 10 (6–2), Desportivo de Maputo 9 (12–8), Textáfrica 6 (2–6), Liga Desportiva de Maputo 5 (7–11).)	
8	Desportiva de Maputo	30	10	10	10	35	29	+6	40	
9	Textáfrica	30	11	7	12	22	30	−8	40	
10	Liga Desportiva de Maputo	30	11	7	12	30	36	−6	40	
11	Ferroviário de Nampula	30	10	9	11	35	33	+2	39	
12	Maxaquene	30	9	10	11	30	31	−1	37 (Note: Head-to-head Pts (GF–GA): Maxaquene 10 (6–1), Chibuto 4 (4–5), Desportivo de Nacala 3 (3–7).)	Relegation
13	Chibuto	30	11	4	15	30	34	−4	37	Relegation
14	Desportivo de Nacala	30	10	7	13	31	35	−4	37	Relegation
15	Baía de Pemba	30	6	7	17	25	46	−21	25	Relegation
16	Têxtil do Púnguè	30	4	10	16	16	44	−28	22	Relegation

Source: Soccerway
Rules for classification: 1) points; 2) head-to-head points; 3) head-to-head goal difference; 4) head-to-head goals scored; 5) goal difference; 6) goals scored; 7) playoff.
(C) Champions; (Q) Qualified for the phase indicated
