= 2018 Moçambola =

Moçambola
- Season: 2018
- Champions: UD Songo
- Relegated: CD UP Manica; 1º de Maio; Sporting de Nampula
- Champions League: UD Songo
- Matches played: 240
- Goals scored: 460 (1.92 per match)
- Biggest home win: Ferroviário da Beira 6–0 Sporting de Nampula (3 October 2018); FC Chibuto 6–0 Sporting de Nampula (7 October 2018)
- Biggest away win: Sporting de Nampula 0–3 Costa do Sol (11 March 2018); Sporting de Nampula 0–3 Incomáti (23 June 2018); Textáfrica 0–3 UP Manica (15 September 2018)
- Highest scoring: Ferroviário da Beira 6–0 Sporting de Nampula (3 October 2018); FC Chibuto 6–0 Sporting de Nampula (7 October 2018); Sporting de Nampula 4–2 Maxaquene (22 September 2018)
- Longest winning run: 6 games UD Songo
- Longest unbeaten run: 8 games UD Songo
- Longest winless run: 9 games Sporting de Nampula
- Longest losing run: 3 games Sporting de Nampula

The 2018 Moçambola is the 41st season of top-tier football in Mozambique. The season was initially scheduled to begin on 24 February 2018, bur was postponed to 3 March 2018. The season finished on 4 November 2018.

== Final table ==
Pos	Team	Pld	W	D	L	GF	GA	GD	Pts	Qualification or relegation
1	UD Songo	30	17	7	6	38	26	+12	58	Champions
2	Ferroviário de Maputo	30	17	3	10	30	23	+7	54	
3	Liga Desportiva de Maputo	30	15	6	9	37	25	+12	51	
4	Clube Ferroviário de Nampula	30	13	8	9	46	34	+12	47	
5	CD Maxaquene	30	11	11	8	34	28	+6	44	
6	FC Chibuto	30	11	10	9	39	24	+15	43	
7	GDR Textáfrica	30	11	9	10	26	34	−8	42	
8	CD Costa do Sol	30	9	13	8	24	17	+7	40	
9	Clube Ferroviário da Beira	30	10	9	11	37	28	+9	39	
10	Desportivo de Nacala	30	10	8	12	24	23	+1	38	
11	ENH	30	10	8	12	21	26	−5	38	
12	Incomáti de Xinavane	30	8	11	11	19	21	−2	35	
13	Clube Ferroviário de Nacala Velha	30	8	11	11	18	26	−8	35	
14	UP Manica	30	8	10	12	24	34	−10	34	Relegated
15	1º de Maio	30	8	8	14	24	36	−12	32	Relegated
16	Sporting de Nampula	30	4	8	18	19	55	−36	20	Relegated
