= 2022 Moçambola =

Moçambola
- Season: 2022
- Champions: UD Songo
- Matches played: 132
- Goals scored: 277 (2.1 per match)
- Top goalscorer: Isac (Nampula, 12 goals)

The 2022 Moçambola was the 44th season of Moçambola, the top-flight football season in Mozambique.

UD Songo won their third title on the last day of the season after defeating Ferroviário Maputo 1–0. Runners-up Black Bulls also won on the last match day but fell a point short of the title.

== League Table ==
| Pos | Team | Pld | W | D | L | GF | GA | GD | Pts | Qualification or relegation |
|---|---|---|---|---|---|---|---|---|---|---|
| 1 | UD Songo (C) | 22 | 15 | 5 | 2 | 34 | 9 | +25 | 50 | Champions, Qualification to the 2023–24 CAF Champions League |
| 2 | Black Bulls | 22 | 15 | 4 | 3 | 45 | 18 | +27 | 49 | |
| 3 | Ferroviário Nampula | 22 | 12 | 4 | 6 | 25 | 19 | +6 | 40 | |
| 4 | Ferroviário Maputo | 22 | 9 | 6 | 7 | 23 | 16 | +7 | 33 | Qualification to the 2023–24 CAF Confederation Cup |
| 5 | Ferroviário Beira | 22 | 6 | 11 | 5 | 25 | 19 | +6 | 29 | |
| 6 | Ferroviário de Lichinga | 22 | 8 | 4 | 10 | 21 | 23 | −2 | 28 | |
| 7 | Costa do Sol | 22 | 8 | 4 | 10 | 22 | 27 | −5 | 28 | |
| 8 | Vilankulos | 22 | 7 | 5 | 10 | 21 | 30 | −9 | 26 | |
| 9 | Ferroviário Nacala | 22 | 8 | 2 | 12 | 20 | 29 | −9 | 26 | |
| 10 | Incomáti (R) | 22 | 4 | 10 | 8 | 12 | 23 | −11 | 22 | Relegation |
| 11 | Matchedje de Mocuba (R) | 22 | 4 | 5 | 13 | 16 | 38 | −22 | 17 | Relegation |
| 12 | Liga Desportiva (R) | 22 | 3 | 6 | 13 | 13 | 26 | −13 | 15 | Relegation |

Rules for classification: 1) points; 2) goal difference; 3) number of goals scored.
(C) Champions; (R) Relegated
