= Jojó =

Mozambican footballer

Personal information
- Full name: Jorge Miguel Moreira Larrouy Fernandes
- Date of birth: 6 September 1970 (age 56)
- Place of birth: Mozambique
- Height: 1.78 m (5 ft 10 in)
- Positions: Right back; midfielder

Youth career
- Desportivo Tete

Senior career*
Years	Team	Apps	(Gls)
1988–1990	Costa do Sol	47	(18)
1990–1991	Ferroviário Maputo	25	(13)
1992–1994	Boavista	0	(0)
1992–1993	→ União Leiria (loan)	4	(0)
1994–1995	Ovarense	23	(0)
1995–1997	Penafiel	57	(5)
1997–1999	Belenenses	49	(1)
1999–2005	Espinho	155	(15)
2005–2006	Fraser Park	33	(5)
2007	Bonnyrigg White Eagles	17	(2)
Total		409	(59)

International career
1989–2003	Mozambique	77	(11)
- * Club domestic league appearances and goals

Jorge Miguel Moreira Larrouy Fernandes (born 6 September 1970), commonly known as Jojó, is a Mozambican retired footballer who played as a right back and also as a right midfielder.

== Club career ==
The son of Portuguese settlers in Mozambique, Jojó began his career with Clube de Desportos da Costa do Sol and Clube Ferroviário de Maputo. In 1992, he returned to the land of his ancestors and signed for Boavista FC, but never appeared officially for the team, also being loaned to U.D. Leiria.

Most of Jojó's Portuguese career was spent in the second division. In 1997–98 he had his first and only Primeira Liga experience, appearing in 24 scoreless matches for C.F. Os Belenenses as the season ended in relegation. In the country, he also represented, in a total of 12 years, A.D. Ovarense, F.C. Penafiel and S.C. Espinho (two of his six campaigns with the latter club were spent in the third level).

In 2005, aged 35, Jojó moved to Australia, closing out his career two years later having represented Fraser Park FC and Bonnyrigg White Eagles FC. He later obtained his UEFA coaching licence, both levels 1 and 2.

== International career ==
Jojó played for the Mozambican national side in the 1996 and 1998 Africa Cup of Nations finals, winning nearly 80 caps in 14 years.
