= Bruno Langa =

Mozambican footballer

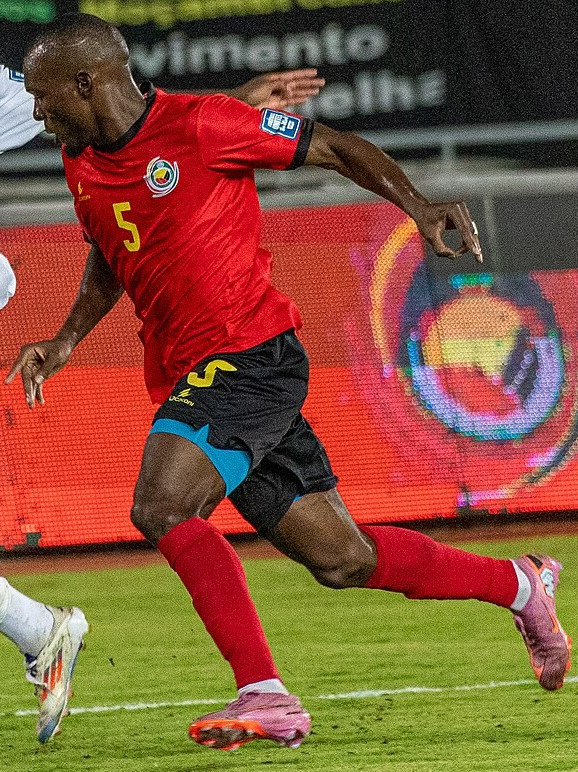

Personal information
- Full name: Bruno Alberto Langa
- Date of birth: 31 October 1997 (age 29)
- Place of birth: Maputo, Mozambique
- Height: 1.69 m (5 ft 7 in)
- Position: Left-back

Team information
- Current team: Qarabağ
- Number: 5

Senior career*
Years	Team	Apps	(Gls)
2016–2018	Maxaquene		
2018–2019	Black Bulls	0	(0)
2018–2019	→ Amora (loan)	22	(0)
2019–2021	Amora	22	(1)
2019–2020	→ Vitória Setúbal (loan)	0	(0)
2021–2024	Chaves	72	(1)
2024	→ Almería (loan)	11	(1)
2024–2026	Almería	25	(0)
2025–2026	→ Pafos (loan)	7	(0)
2026	→ Estrela da Amadora (loan)	11	(0)
2026–	Qarabağ	0	(0)

International career^{‡}
2016–2017	Mozambique U20	7	(2)
2016–	Mozambique	38	(2)
- * Club domestic league appearances and goals as of 21 June 2026 ‡ National team caps and goals as of 22:11, 17 November 2025 (UTC)

Bruno Alberto Langa (born 31 October 1997) is a Mozambican professional footballer who plays as a left-back for Azerbaijan Premier League club Qarabağ and the Mozambique national team.

== Career ==
=== Early career ===
Langa began his senior career in Mozambique, with Maxaquene. In July 2018, he was bought by Black Bulls, but moved on loan to Portuguese club Amora in the Campeonato de Portugal.

After being regularly used at Amora, Langa signed a permanent three-year contract with the club on 26 May 2019, but joined Primeira Liga side Vitória de Setúbal on loan on 22 June, being assigned to the under-23 team. He returned to Amora in July 2020, after terminating his loan, being named in the Campeonato de Portugal Team of the Year for the 2020–21 season.

=== Chaves ===
On 23 June 2021, Langa joined Chaves in the Liga Portugal 2. He made his professional debut with the club on 24 July, in a 2–1 Taça da Liga loss to Farense, and was a regular starter during the campaign as his side achieved promotion to the top tier.

Langa made his debut in the top tier of Portuguese football on 7 August 2022, starting in a 1–0 home loss to Vitória de Guimarães. He scored his first professional goal on 3 September 2023, netting the equaliser in a 2–1 home loss to Moreirense.

=== Almería ===
On 1 February 2024, Spanish La Liga side Almería announced the signing of Langa on loan until the end of the season, with a buyout clause. On 2 July, despite the club's relegation, he signed a permanent four-year contract with them.

On 4 July 2025, Almería announced the loan of Langa to Cypriot club Pafos, for one year. However, on 30 January 2026 his loan was terminated. Two days later, Langa returned to Portugal, joining Primeira Liga club Estrela da Amadora on loan until the end of the 2025–26 season.

=== Qarabag ===
On 17 June 2026, the Azerbaijani club Qarabag officially announced the transfer of the player. Langa signed a three-year contract with Qarabag. Expected to replace Elvin Cafarguliyev, who is anticipated to leave the "Horsemen", the player will wear the number 5 shirt for the team.

== International career ==
Langa represented the Mozambique U20s at the 2016 COSAFA U-20 Cup. He made his debut with the senior Mozambique national team in a 3–0 2016 COSAFA Cup loss to Namibia on 21 June 2016.

On 2 June 2021, he scored his first international goal against Lesotho in a friendly match, from a penalty. In December 2023, he was included in the list of twenty-seven Mozambican players selected by Chiquinho Conde to take part in the 2023 Africa Cup of Nations. Bruno Langa will thus play in his first international tournament.

== Career statistics ==
=== Club ===
As of match played 21 January 2026

Appearances and goals by club, season and competition
Club	Season	League			National cup		League Cup		Continental		Other		Total	
Club	Season	Division	Apps	Goals	Apps	Goals	Apps	Goals	Apps	Goals	Apps	Goals	Apps	Goals
Black Bulls	2018	Moçambola	0	0	0	0	—		—		—		0	0
Amora (loan)	2018–19	Campeonato de Portugal	22	0	3	0	—		—		—		25	0
Amora	2019–20	Campeonato de Portugal	22	1	3	0	—		—		—		25	1
Vitória Setúbal (loan)	2019–20	Primeira Liga	0	0	0	0	0	0	—		—		0	0
Chaves	2021–22	Liga Portugal 2	28	0	1	0	1	0	—		2 (Note: Appearances in promotion play-offs)	0	32	0
Chaves	2022–23	Primeira Liga	29	0	0	0	2	0	—		—		31	0
Chaves	2023–24	Primeira Liga	15	1	1	0	1	0	—		—		17	1
Chaves	Total		72	1	2	0	4	0	—		—		78	1
Almería (loan)	2023–24	La Liga	11	1	—		—		—		—		11	1
Almería	2024–25	Segunda División	24	0	2	0	—		—		1 (Note: Appearances in La Liga play-offs)	0	27	0
Pafos (loan)	2025–26	Cypriot First Division	6	0	0	0	—		11 (Note: Appearances in UEFA Champions League)	0	—		17	0
Career total			157	3	10	0	4	0	11	0	3	0	185	3

=== International ===
As of match played 17 November 2025

Appearances and goals by national team and year
National team	Year	Apps	Goals
Mozambique	2016	1	0
Mozambique	2017	2	0
Mozambique	2021	6	1
Mozambique	2022	2	0
Mozambique	2023	7	0
Mozambique	2024	13	1
Mozambique	2025	7	0
Total		38	2

Scores and results list Mozambique's goal tally first, score column indicates score after each Langa goal.

List of international goals scored by Bruno Langa
No.	Date	Venue	Opponent	Score	Result	Competition
1	2 June 2021	Estádio do Zimpeto, Maputo, Mozambique	Lesotho	2–0	5–0	Friendly
2	19 November 2024	Estádio Nacional 24 de Setembro, Bissau, Guinea-Bissau	Guinea-Bissau	1–0	2–1	2025 Africa Cup of Nations qualification
