= Nené (footballer, born 1996) =

Mozambican footballer

Personal information
- Full name: Feliciano João Jone
- Date of birth: 15 November 1996 (age 30)
- Place of birth: Chimoio, Mozambique
- Height: 1.88 m (6 ft 2 in)
- Position: Midfielder

Team information
- Current team: Abu Salim
- Number: 5

Senior career*
Years	Team	Apps	(Gls)
2015–2018	GDR Textáfrica		
2018–2021	Costa do Sol		
2022–2025	Associação Black Bulls		
2025–	Abu Salim	0	(0)

International career^{‡}
2017–	Mozambique	46	(1)
- * Club domestic league appearances and goals as of 23 July 2020 ‡ National team caps and goals as of 15 November 2025

Feliciano João Jone (born 15 November 1996), commonly known as Nené, is a Mozambican footballer who plays as a midfielder for Abu Salim and the Mozambique national football team.

== Career ==
=== International ===
Nené made his senior international debut on 28 June 2017, coming on as a 71st-minute substitute for Nuno in a 2–1 victory over Seychelles at the 2017 COSAFA Cup.

== Career statistics ==
=== International ===
As of matches played 4 August 2019.

National team	Year	Apps	Goals
Mozambique	2017	2	0
Mozambique	2019	7	0
Total		9	0

=== International goal ===
Scores and results list Mozambique's goal tally first, score column indicates score after each Nené goal.

List of international goals scored by Nené
No.	Date	Venue	Opponent	Score	Result	Competition
1	17 January 2023	Nelson Mandela Stadium, Baraki, Algiers, Algeria	Libya	2–1	3–2	2022 African Nations Championship

== Honors ==
=== Club ===
Costa do Sol

Moçambola Champion: 2019
