= Mozambique national football team =

Men's association football team representing Mozambique

Mozambique
- Nickname: Os Mambas (The Mambas)
- Association: Federação Moçambicana de Futebol (FMF)
- Confederation: CAF (Africa)
- Sub-confederation: COSAFA (Southern Africa)
- Head coach: Chiquinho Conde
- Captain: Domingues
- Most caps: Domingues (124)
- Top scorer: Tico-Tico (30)
- Home stadium: Estádio do Zimpeto
- FIFA code: MOZ
First colours	Second colours	Third colours

FIFA ranking
- Current: 98 ▲5 (7 October 2026)
- Highest: 66 (November 1997)
- Lowest: 134 (July 2005, September 2006)

First international
- Mozambique 2–1 Zambia (Mozambique; 25 June 1975)

Biggest win
- Mozambique 6–1 Lesotho (Mozambique; 10 August 1980); Mozambique 5–0 South Sudan (Maputo, Mozambique; 18 May 2014); Mozambique 5–0 Lesotho (Maputo, Mozambique; 2 June 2021)

Biggest defeat
- Rhodesia 6–0 Mozambique (Salisbury, Rhodesia; 19 May 1979); Zimbabwe 6–0 Mozambique (Salisbury, Zimbabwe; 20 April 1980)

Africa Cup of Nations
- Appearances: 6 (first in 1986)
- Best result: Round of 16 (2025)

African Nations Championship
- Appearances: 2 (first in 2014)
- Best result: Quarter-finals (2022)

COSAFA Cup
- Appearances: 19 (first in 1997)
- Best result: Runners-up (2008, 2015)
Medal record
COSAFA Cup
Silver medal – second place	2008 South Africa
Silver medal – second place	2015 South Africa
Bronze medal – third place	1997 Southern Africa
Bronze medal – third place	2009 Zimbabwe
Bronze medal – third place	2024 South Africa

The Mozambique national football team (Portuguese: Seleção Moçambicana de Futebol) represents Mozambique in men's international football competitions and is controlled by the Mozambican Football Federation, the governing body for football in Mozambique. Mozambique have never qualified for a FIFA World Cup, but they have qualified for six Africa Cup of Nations, having advanced to the knockout stage for the first time in 2025. They have also appeared at the African Nations Championship on two occasions where, at the 2022 edition, they claimed their first ever victory and reached the knockout stage of an 11-aside CAF tournament for the first time history. In 1997, the Mozambique Football Federation became a founding member of COSAFA.

Mozambique's home ground is Estádio do Zimpeto in Zimpeto in the capital city Maputo, and can hold 42,000 spectators. The team's current head coach is former player Chiquinho Conde, who became manager in July 2019, replacing previous head coach and former Portugal international Abel Xavier, who had been in charge since February 2016.

== History ==
=== Beginnings ===
On the day of independence in 1975, Mozambique played its first ever match; a friendly against Zambia, winning 2–1. Two years later, Cuba became Mozambique's first non-African opponent when the two countries met in Mozambique, with Cuba winning 2–0. Mozambique entered World Cup qualifying for the first time in the 1982 qualifying competition. Mozambique were defeated 7–3 over two legs by Zaire in the first round.

=== 1986 Africa Cup of Nations ===
Mozambique qualified for its first Africa Cup of Nations in 1986. In the qualifying competition they beat Mauritius, Malawi (on penalties), and finally Libya, winning again on penalties.

At the final tournament in Egypt, Mozambique were placed in Group A along with Senegal, Ivory Coast and hosts Egypt. They lost all their games 3–0, 2–0 and 2–0, not scoring a single goal.

=== 1996 Africa Cup of Nations ===
Mozambique had to wait 10 years to qualify for another Africa Cup of Nations, as they qualified for the 1996 tournament in South Africa. They were placed in Group D along with Ivory Coast, Ghana and Tunisia. Mozambique played their first game against Tunisia in Port Elizabeth, drawing 1–1 with Tico-Tico scoring their first ever goal at the finals in the 4th minute. They then went on to lose 1–0 to Ivory Coast and 2–0 to Ghana, thus eliminating them from the tournament.

=== 1998 Africa Cup of Nations ===
Two years later, Mozambique qualified for their third Africa Cup of Nations held in Burkina Faso. They were again placed in group D along with Morocco, Egypt and Zambia. Mozambique lost their first game against eventual tournament winners Egypt 2–0, both goals coming from Hossam Hassan. In their second game they again lost to Morocco 3–0, therefore eliminating them from the tournament with one game still remaining. In their last game against Zambia, they drew 1–1, their first goal of the tournament. This would prove to be their last African Cup of Nations game for 12 years.

=== 2010 FIFA World Cup qualification ===
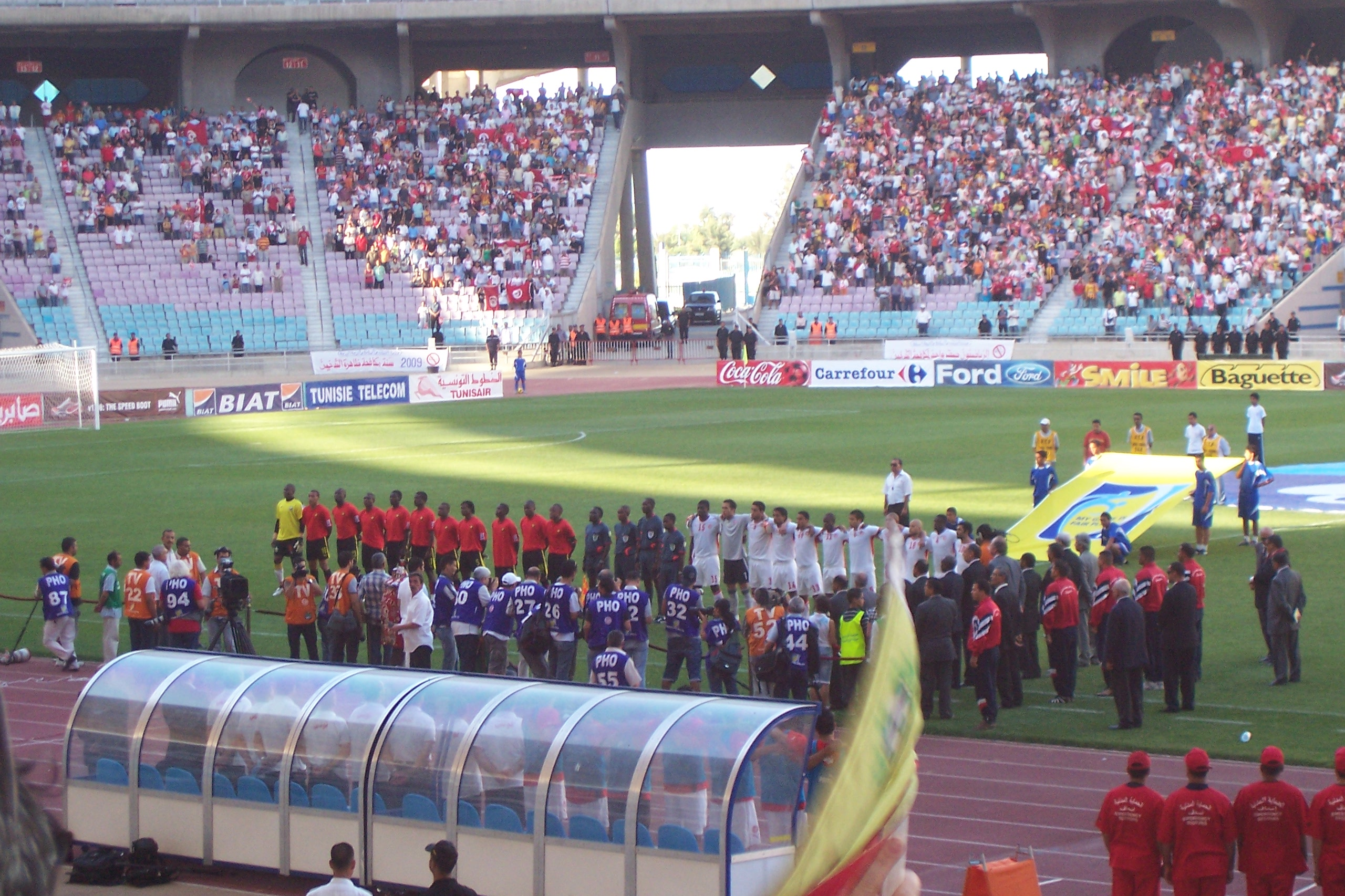
The national football team of Mozambique before a game against Tunisia

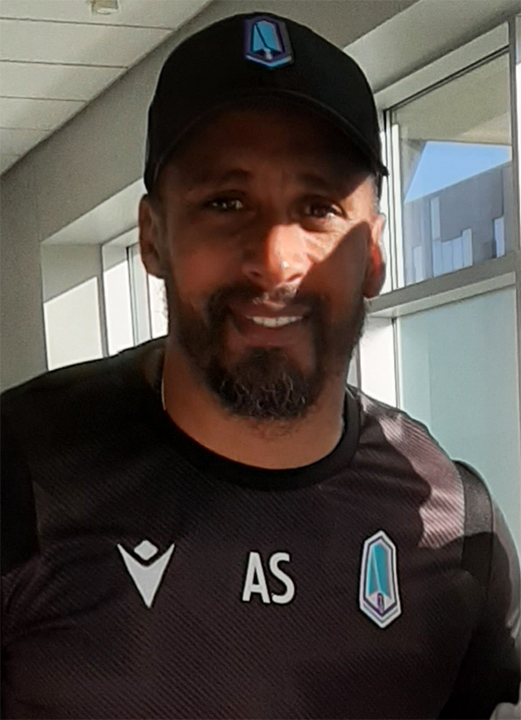
Armando Sá played six games for Mozambique

Mozambique entered the 2010 FIFA World Cup qualification in the second round, and were placed in Group 7 with Botswana, Madagascar and African football giants Ivory Coast. They made a terrible start to qualifying, losing to Ivory Coast and minnows Botswana 1–0 and 2–1, and drawing 1–1 with Madagascar. Mozambique then went on to beat Madagascar 3–0 in Antananarivo with goals coming from Tico-Tico, Carlitos and Domingues. They then drew 1–1 with Ivory Coast and beat Botswana 1–0 in Gaborone to qualify for the third Round.

Mozambique were one of the lowest seeded teams in the third round, and were placed in Group B with Nigeria, Tunisia and Kenya. They went on to draw their first game against giants Nigeria 0–0 in Maputo. They then went on to lose their next to games against Tunisia and Kenya 2–0 and 2–1, now making it a struggle to qualify for their first FIFA World Cup. In the next game, they beat Kenya 1–0 with Tico-Tico scoring, but then a loss to Nigeria eliminated them from qualifying. In the last game they beat Tunisia 1–0 in a victory that stopped Tunisia from qualifying. Despite not qualifying for the World Cup, this win was enough to secure third place and qualification for the 2010 Africa Cup of Nations in Angola.

=== 2010 Africa Cup of Nations ===
After a 12-year absence from Africa Cup of Nations football, Mozambique were placed in Group C with Egypt, Nigeria and Benin. In their first game, they played Benin, drawing 2–2 after being 2–0 down, with goals coming from Miro and Fumo. They then went on to lose 2–0 to eventual tournament winners Egypt and 3–0 to Nigeria, thus eliminating them from the tournament. After the tournament, all-time top scorer and captain Tico-Tico retired from international football.

=== Recent years ===
Mozambique had several close misses when it came to reaching another AFCON Finals. During the 2013 qualifiers, they reached the final round and beat Morocco 2–0 in the first leg in Maputo. However, they were beaten 4–0 in Marrakesh four days later. During the 2019 qualifiers the Mambas were only denied by a Guinea-Bissau equaliser in stoppage time at the end of their final Group K match.

Finally, in 2023, Mozambique qualified for the AFCON for the first time since 2010 after beating Benin 3-2 at home on the final day of qualification. They would finish bottom of their group at the finals, drawing 2-2 with both Egypt and Ghana in their first and last games respectively but losing 3-0 to Cape Verde in between.

Mozambique qualified for the 2025 Africa Cup of Nations, which is set to be their sixth appearance at the tournament.

== Recent results and fixtures ==
The following is a list of match results in the last 12 months, as well as any future matches that have been scheduled.

Win Draw Loss Fixture

=== 2025 ===
14 November Friendly	Morocco	1–0	Mozambique	Tangier, Morocco
20:00 UTC+1	Ounahi 7'	Report		Stadium: Ibn Batouta Stadium; Attendance: 60,000; Referee: Moussa Diou (Mauritania)

17 November Friendly	Chad	2–2	Mozambique	Berrechid, Morocco
16:00 UTC+1	Mouandilmadji 45+2'; M. Thiam 90+1' (pen.)	Report	Catamo 79' (pen.); Gildo 90+6'	Stadium: Stade Municipal De Berrechid

17 December Friendly match	Angola	4–1	Mozambique	Almancil, Portugal
16:00 UTC+0	Gelson Dala 25'; Luvumbo 81'; Carmo 90'; Modesto 120'	Report	Witi 104' (pen.)	Stadium: Parque das Cidades Training Center; Attendance: Behind closed doors
Note: The match consisted of two 45-minute halves plus a single, extra period of 30 minutes.

24 December 2025 AFCON GS	Ivory Coast	1–0	Mozambique	Marrakesh, Morocco
18:30 UTC+1	Amad 49'	Report		Stadium: Marrakesh Stadium; Attendance: 13,041; Referee: Samuel Uwikunda (Rwanda)

28 December 2025 AFCON GS	Gabon	2–3	Mozambique	Agadir, Morocco
13:30 UTC+1	Aubameyang 45+5'; Moussounda 76'	Report	Bangal 37'; Catamo 42' (pen.); Calila 52'	Stadium: Adrar Stadium; Attendance: 9,796; Referee: Mehrez Melki (Tunisia)

31 December 2025 AFCON GS	Mozambique	1–2	Cameroon	Agadir, Morocco
20:00 UTC+1	Catamo 23'	Report	Nené 28' (o.g.); Kofane 55'	Stadium: Adrar Stadium; Attendance: 13,093; Referee: Jalal Jayed (Morocco)

=== 2026 ===
5 January 2025 AFCON R16	Nigeria	4–0	Mozambique	Fez, Morocco
20:00 UTC+1	Lookman 20'; Osimhen 25', 47'; Adams 75'	Report		Stadium: Fez Stadium; Referee: Abdou Abdel Mefire (Cameroon)

7 June Friendly	Oman	4–1	Mozambique	Bekasi, Indonesia
20:00 UTC+7	Al Sabhi 30', 51' (pen.), 59'; Al-Shukaili 88'		Reis 62'	Stadium: Patriot Stadium

9 June Friendly	Indonesia	1–0	Mozambique	Jakarta, Indonesia
20:00 UTC+7	Romeny 12'			Stadium: Gelora Bung Karno Stadium; Attendance: 29,889

25 September 2027 AFCON qualification	Mozambique	v	Senegal	Maputo, Mozambique
15:00 UTC+0				Stadium: Zimpeto Stadium

29 September 2027 AFCON qualification	Mozambique	v	Sudan	TBD, Mozambique
15:00 UTC+0				Stadium: TBD

11 November 2027 AFCON qualification	Mozambique	v	Ethiopia	TBD, Mozambique
TBD				Stadium: TBD

15 November 2027 AFCON qualification	Ethiopia	v	Mozambique	TBD, Ethiopia
TBD				Stadium: TBD

=== 2027 ===
24 March 2027 AFCON qualification	Senegal	v	Mozambique	TBD, Senegal
TBD				Stadium: TBD

28 March 2027 AFCON qualification	Sudan	v	Mozambique	TBD, Sudan
TBD				Stadium: TBD

== Coaching history ==
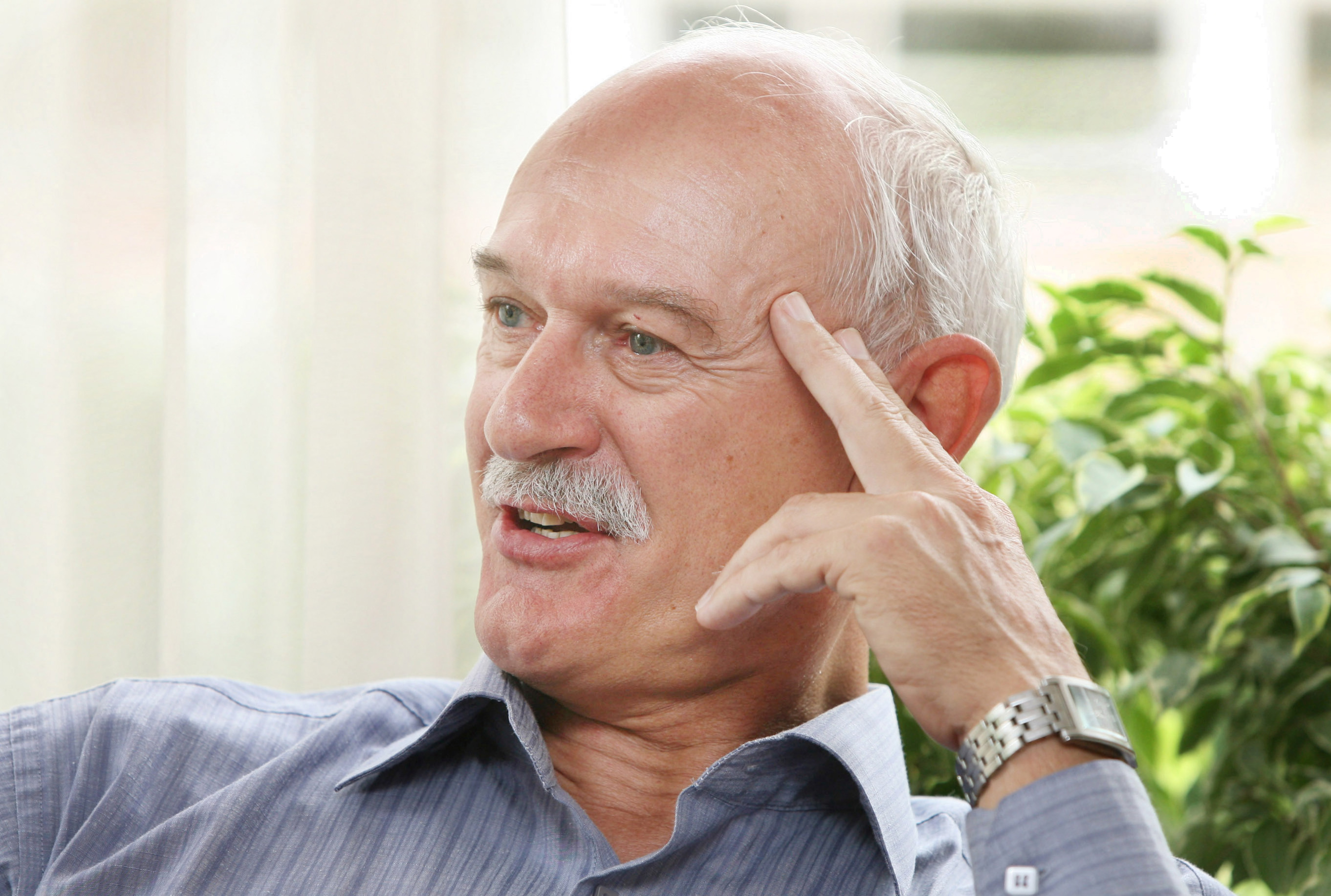
Mart Nooij became the manager of Mozambique in 2007

- (Mozambique) Cremildo Loforte (1980)
- (Mozambique) Manaca (1986)
- (Mozambique) José Geneto (1986)
- (Russia) Viktor Bondarenko (1993–1995)
- (Portugal) Rui Caçador (1996)
- (Mozambique) Arnaldo Salvado (1996–1998)
- (Mozambique) Euroflim da Graça (1999)
- (Mozambique) Arnaldo Salvado (1999–2000)
- (Portugal) Augusto Matine (2001–2002)
- (Russia) Viktor Bondarenko (2003)
- (Mozambique) Artur Semedo (2003–2006)
- (Netherlands) Mart Nooij (2007–2011)
- (Germany) Gert Engels (2011–2013)
- (Mozambique) João Chissano (2013–2015)
- (Mozambique) Hélder Muianga (2015)
- (Croatia) Boris Pušić (2015)
- (Portugal) Abel Xavier (2016–2019)
- (Mozambique) Victor Matine (2019)
- (Mozambique) Luís Gonçalves (2019–2021)
- (Portugal) Horácio Gonçalves (2021)
- (Mozambique) Chiquinho Conde (2021–present)

== Players ==
=== Current squad ===
The following players were called up for the 2027 Africa Cup of Nations qualification against Senegal and Sudan on 25 and 29 September 2026, respectively.

Caps and goals correct as of 5 January 2026, after the match against Nigeria.

No.	Pos.	Player	Date of birth (age)	Caps	Goals	Club
	GK	Ernan Siluane	9 July 1998 (age 28)	32	0	(Rwanda Football Federation) APR
	GK	José Guirrugo	3 June 1992 (age 34)	14	0	(Mozambican Football Federation) Black Bulls
	GK	Kimiss Zavala	8 May 2004 (age 22)	1	0	(Portuguese Football Federation) Marítimo
	DF	Bruno Langa	31 October 1997 (age 28)	37	1	(Association of Football Federations of Azerbaijan) Qarabağ
	DF	Nené	15 November 1996 (age 29)	33	1	(Mozambican Football Federation) Costa do Sol
	DF	Edmilson Dove	18 July 1994 (age 32)	39	0	(Iraq Football Association) Newroz
	DF	Fernando Chamboco	15 June 1998 (age 28)	11	0	(Royal Moroccan Football Federation) FUS Rabat
	DF	Diogo Calila	10 October 1998 (age 28)	8	1	(Royal Moroccan Football Federation) MAS Fès
	DF	Bruno Wilson	27 December 1996 (age 29)	0	0	(Football Federation of Armenia) Ararat-Armenia
	DF	Oscar Cherene	28 March 2003 (age 23)	0	0	(Mozambican Football Federation) UD Songo
	DF	Celton Janisse		0	0	(Mozambican Football Federation) Black Bulls
	DF	Valter Nhacussa	12 May 2002 (age 24)	0	0	(Mozambican Football Federation) Ferroviário da Beira
	MF	Witi	26 August 1996 (age 30)	44	4	(Football Federation of Armenia) Pyunik
	MF	Geny Catamo	26 January 2001 (age 25)	43	14	(Portuguese Football Federation) Sporting CP
	MF	Manuel Kambala	21 August 1991 (age 35)	42	0	(South African Football Association) Polokwane City
	MF	Gildo Vilanculos	31 January 1995 (age 31)	39	4	(Portuguese Football Federation) Alcochetense
	MF	Guima	14 November 1995 (age 30)	25	2	(Association of Football Federations of Azerbaijan) Zira
	MF	Alfons Amade	12 November 1999 (age 26)	20	1	(Scottish Football Association) Dunfermline Athletic
	MF	Candinho	6 October 1997 (age 29)	10	0	(Mozambican Football Federation) Black Bulls
	MF	Edson Mucuana	12 December 2003 (age 22)	1	0	(Portuguese Football Federation) Caldas
	FW	Stanley Ratifo	5 December 1994 (age 31)	41	9	(German Football Association) Hallescher FC
	FW	Dayo António	20 August 1995 (age 31)	23	3	(Mozambican Football Federation) Ferroviário da Beira
	FW	Faisal Bangal	5 January 1995 (age 31)	16	4	(Italian Football Federation) Turris
	FW	Chamito	14 January 2004 (age 22)	8	3	(Portuguese Football Federation) Belenenses
	FW	Alcides Raice	17 May 2005 (age 21)	0	0	(Turkish Football Federation) Keçiörengücü

=== Recent call-ups ===
The following players have been called up for Mozambique in the last 12 months.

Pos.	Player	Date of birth (age)	Caps	Goals	Club	Latest call-up
GK	Ivane Urrubal	1 March 1997 (age 29)	13	0	(Mozambique) AD Pemba	v. Senegal, 25 September 2026 ^{PRE}
GK	Crimildo de Melo	14 February 2004 (age 22)	0	0	(Mozambique) Ferroviário da Beira	v. Senegal, 25 September 2026 ^{PRE}
GK	Armando Doutor	20 April 2002 (age 24)	0	0	(Mozambique) Costa do Sol	v. Senegal, 25 September 2026 ^{PRE}
GK	Acácio Muendane	28 April 2003 (age 23)	0	0	(Mozambique) Ferroviário de Nampula	v. Senegal, 25 September 2026 ^{PRE}
DF	Francisco Muchanga	5 November 1991 (age 34)	41	0	(Mozambique) Costa do Sol	v. Senegal, 25 September 2026 ^{PRE}
DF	Martinho Thauzene	27 September 1999 (age 27)	29	1	(Mozambique) Black Bulls	v. Senegal, 25 September 2026 ^{PRE}
DF	Domingos Macandza	17 June 1998 (age 28)	24	0	(Mozambique) Ferroviário de Nacala	v. Senegal, 25 September 2026 ^{PRE}
DF	Bheu Januário	11 August 1993 (age 33)	12	1	(Mozambique) Ferroviário da Beira	v. Senegal, 25 September 2026 ^{PRE}
DF	Fernando Macaime	7 June 1998 (age 28)	8	0	(Mozambique) UD Songo	v. Senegal, 25 September 2026 ^{PRE}
DF	Nanani	8 February 1996 (age 30)	30	0	(Mozambique) Songo	v. Indonesia, 9 June 2026
DF	Manuel Cumbane	10 April 2006 (age 20)	0	0	(Mozambique) Black Bulls	v. Indonesia, 9 June 2026
DF	Reinildo Mandava (third captain)	21 January 1994 (age 32)	56	5	(England) Sunderland	2025 Africa Cup of Nations
DF	Mexer (vice-captain)	8 September 1987 (age 39)	77	3	(Turkey) Ankara Keçiörengücü	2025 Africa Cup of Nations
MF	Amadú	12 March 1996 (age 30)	32	0	(Mozambique) Costa do Sol	v. Senegal, 25 September 2026 ^{PRE}
MF	João Bonde	9 January 1997 (age 29)	6	0	(Mozambique) Costa do Sol	v. Senegal, 25 September 2026 ^{PRE}
MF	Keyns Abdala	15 March 2003 (age 23)	1	0	(Portugal) Chaves	v. Senegal, 25 September 2026 ^{PRE}
MF	Diego Pelembe	9 June 2009 (age 17)	0	0	(Mozambique) Black Bulls	v. Senegal, 25 September 2026 ^{PRE}
MF	Naftal Titos	30 November 1998 (age 27)	0	0	(Mozambique) Ferroviário de Maputo	v. Senegal, 25 September 2026 ^{PRE}
MF	Luís Miquissone	25 July 1995 (age 31)	47	9	(Egypt) Al Ahly	v. Indonesia, 9 June 2026
MF	Dário Melo	20 January 1996 (age 30)	19	1	(Mozambique) Ferroviário de Nacala	v. Indonesia, 9 June 2026
MF	Xamin Chalinda	25 February 2003 (age 23)	0	0	(Mozambique) CD Chingale	v. Indonesia, 9 June 2026
MF	Ezequiel Machava	3 January 2003 (age 23)	0	0	(Mozambique) Ferroviário de Maputo	v. Indonesia, 9 June 2026
MF	Nélio Matsinhe		0	0	(Mozambique) Ferroviário de Maputo	v. Indonesia, 9 June 2026
MF	Domingues (captain)	13 November 1983 (age 42)	124	17	(Mozambique) Songo	2025 Africa Cup of Nations
MF	Shaquille	24 November 1997 (age 28)	42	0	(Angola) Sagrada Esperança	2025 Africa Cup of Nations
MF	Pepo	24 March 1994 (age 32)	13	2	(Portugal) Caldas	v. Chad, 18 November 2025
FW	Amâncio Canhembe	16 November 1997 (age 28)	6	1	(Mozambique) UD Songo	v. Senegal, 25 September 2026 ^{PRE}
FW	Ângelo Cantolo	23 May 2003 (age 23)	2	0	(Mozambique) Black Bulls	v. Senegal, 25 September 2026 ^{PRE}
FW	Melque Alexandre	26 June 1997 (age 29)	27	4	(Mozambique) Songo	2025 Africa Cup of Nations
FW	Clésio	11 October 1994 (age 32)	62	9	(Mozambique) Black Bulls	2025 Africa Cup of Nations
^{DEC} Player refused to join the team after the call-up.^{INJ} Player withdrew from the squad due to an injury.^{PRE} Preliminary squad.^{RET} Player has retired from international football.^{SUS} Suspended from the national team.

== Records ==
As of 5 January 2026
Players in bold are still active with Mozambique.

=== Most appearances ===
Rank	Player	Caps	Goals	Career
1.	**Domingues Pelembé**	124	17	2004–2026
2.	Tico-Tico	94	30	1992–2010
3.	Miró Lobo	84	8	2004–2015
4.	**Mexer**	80	3	2007–2026
5.	Sérgio Faife	67	5	1992–2008
6.	João Kapango	66	0	1996–2012
6.	Nana Matola	66	5	1988–1999
8.	Zainadine Júnior	64	1	2008–2023
9.	**Clésio**	63	9	2011–present
10.	Momed Hagi	62	3	2005–2015

=== Top goalscorers ===
Rank	Player	Goals	Caps	Ratio	Career
1.	Tico-Tico	30	94	0.32	1992–2010
2	**Domingues Pelembé**	17	124	0.14	2004–2026
3.	Dário Monteiro	16	48	0.33	1996–2011
4.	**Geny Catamo**	14	43	0.33	2019–present
5.	Chiquinho Conde	12	43	0.28	1985–2001
6.	Gil Guiamba	11	22	0.5	1980–1983
7.	Arnaldo Ouana	10	37	0.27	1987–1999
8	Luís Miquissone	9	48	0.19	2015–2023
8	**Stanley Ratifo**	9	50	0.18	2017–present
8	**Clésio**	9	63	0.14	2011–present

== Competitive record ==
=== FIFA World Cup ===
FIFA World Cup record									Qualification record					
Year	Round	Position	Pld	W	D*	L	GF	GA	Pld	W	D	L	GF	GA
1930 to 1974	Part of Portugal								Part of Portugal					
(Argentina) 1978	Not a FIFA member								Not a FIFA member					
(Spain) 1982	Did not qualify								2	0	0	2	3	7
1986 and 1990	Did not enter								Declined participation					
(United States) 1994	Did not qualify								4	0	1	3	3	11
(France) 1998	Did not qualify								2	0	1	1	1	3
(South Korea) (Japan) 2002	Did not qualify								2	1	0	1	2	2
(Germany) 2006	Did not qualify								2	0	0	2	3	5
(South Africa) 2010	Did not qualify								12	4	3	5	10	10
(Brazil) 2014	Did not qualify								8	2	3	3	7	11
(Russia) 2018	Did not qualify								2	1	0	1	1	1
(Qatar) 2022	Did not qualify								8	3	1	4	5	8
(Canada) (Mexico) (United States) 2026	Did not qualify								10	6	0	4	14	17
(Morocco) (Portugal) (Spain) 2030	To be determined								To be determined					
(Saudi Arabia) 2034	To be determined								To be determined					
Total	–	0/11	–	–	–	–	–	–	52	17	9	26	49	75

=== Africa Cup of Nations ===
African Cup of Nations record										Qualification record					
Appearances: 6										Appearances: 23					
Year	Round	Position	Pld	W	D*	L	GF	GA	Squad	Pld	W	D	L	GF	GA
(Sudan) 1957	Part of Portugal									Part of Portugal					
(United Arab Republic) 1959	Part of Portugal									Part of Portugal					
(Ethiopia) 1962	Part of Portugal									Part of Portugal					
(Ghana) 1963	Part of Portugal									Part of Portugal					
(Tunisia) 1965	Part of Portugal									Part of Portugal					
(Ethiopia) 1968	Part of Portugal									Part of Portugal					
(Sudan) 1970	Part of Portugal									Part of Portugal					
(Cameroon) 1972	Part of Portugal									Part of Portugal					
(Egypt) 1974	Part of Portugal									Part of Portugal					
(Ethiopia) 1976	Not affiliated to CAF									Not affiliated to CAF					
(Ghana) 1978	Not affiliated to CAF									Not affiliated to CAF					
(Nigeria) 1980	Did not enter									Did not enter					
(Libya) 1982	Did not qualify									4	1	1	2	11	8
(Ivory Coast) 1984	Did not qualify									2	1	0	1	3	4
(Egypt) 1986	Group stage	8th	3	0	0	3	0	7	Squad	6	2	3	1	8	5
(Morocco) 1988	Did not qualify									2	0	1	1	3	4
(Algeria) 1990	Did not qualify									2	0	0	2	0	4
(Senegal) 1992	Did not qualify									4	2	0	2	3	3
(Tunisia) 1994	Did not qualify									6	1	3	2	5	7
(South Africa) 1996	Group stage	14th	3	0	1	2	1	4	Squad	10	6	2	2	16	8
(Burkina Faso) 1998	Group stage	16th	3	0	0	3	1	8	Squad	6	3	1	2	10	7
(Ghana) (Nigeria) 2000	Did not qualify									6	2	1	3	6	10
(Mali) 2002	Did not qualify									2	1	0	1	1	1
(Tunisia) 2004	Did not qualify									6	2	2	2	3	8
(Egypt) 2006	Did not qualify									2	0	0	2	3	5
(Ghana) 2008	Did not qualify									6	2	3	1	5	4
(Angola) 2010	Group stage	15th	3	0	1	2	2	7	Squad	12	4	3	5	10	10
(Equatorial Guinea) (Gabon) 2012	Did not qualify									6	2	1	3	4	6
(South Africa) 2013	Did not qualify									4	1	2	1	4	6
(Equatorial Guinea) 2015	Did not qualify									10	3	5	2	13	7
(Gabon) 2017	Did not qualify									6	2	1	3	5	7
(Egypt) 2019	Did not qualify									6	2	2	2	7	7
(Cameroon) 2021	Did not qualify									6	1	1	4	5	10
(Ivory Coast) 2023	Group stage	21st	3	0	2	1	4	7	Squad	6	3	1	2	8	9
(Morocco) 2025	Round of 16	13th	4	1	0	3	4	9	Squad	6	3	2	1	9	5
(Kenya) (Tanzania) (Uganda) 2027	To be determined									To be determined					
2029	To be determined									To be determined					
Total	Round of 16	6/35	19	1	4	14	12	42	—	126	44	35	47	139	145

=== African Nations Championship ===
African Nations Championship record
Appearances: 2
Year	Round	Position	Pld	W	D*	L	GF	GA
(Ivory Coast) 2009	Did not qualify							
(Sudan) 2011	Did not qualify							
(South Africa) 2014	Group stage	16th	3	0	0	3	4	9
(Rwanda) 2016	Did not qualify							
(Morocco) 2018	Did not qualify							
(Cameroon) 2020	Did not qualify							
(Algeria) 2022	Quarter-finals	8th	4	1	1	2	4	6
(Kenya) (Tanzania) (Uganda) 2024	Did not qualify							
Total	Quarter-finals	2/8	6	1	1	5	8	15

== Honours ==
=== Regional ===
- COSAFA Cup
  - (silver) Runners-up (2): 2008, 2015
  - (bronze) Third place (3): 1997, 2009, 2024
