= Maurício Pequenino =

Mozambican footballer

Personal information
- Full name: Mauricío Ernesto Pequenino
- Date of birth: 27 September 1983 (age 43)
- Place of birth: Maputo, Mozambique
- Height: 1.72 m (5 ft 8 in)
- Position: Striker

Team information
- Current team: Maxaquene

Senior career*
Years	Team	Apps	(Gls)
2001–2008	Desportivo Maputo	195	(76)
2008	Golden Arrows	11	(2)
2009–2012	Liga Muçulmana		
2013–	Maxaquene		

International career
2002–2008	Mozambique	12	(0)
- * Club domestic league appearances and goals as of 12 May 2008

Maurício Ernesto Pequenino (born 27 September 1983) is a Mozambican footballer who plays as a striker for Maxaquene.

He joined South African Premier Soccer League side Golden Arrows in early 2008 from Desportivo Maputo where he finished as Moçambola's topscorer in 2005 and 2006.
