= Taça de Moçambique =

Mozambican football competition

Mozambican flag

The Taça de Moçambique, also known as Taça Moçambique (meaning Cup of Mozambique) is the second most important football competition of Mozambique, and it is organized by the Mozambican Football Federation. The competition's first edition was competed for in 1978.

== Competition format ==
The competition is a one-legged single-elimination tournament between teams from all over the country.

The competition is divided in two parts. In the first part, which is called Fase Provincial (meaning Provincial Stage), clubs are split into regional groups in which they play against teams from the same province.

The second part of the cup, which is called Fase Nacional (meaning National Stage), is contested between 16 clubs, qualified from the Provincial Stage.

== List of champions ==
Season	Winner	Score	Runner-up
1978	Maxaquene	4-0	Ferroviário de Beira
1979	Palmeiras de Beira	2-2 (Palmeiras won on py)	Têxtil Punguè
1980	Costa do Sol	3-1	Palmeiras de Beira
1981	Desportivo de Maputo	1-0	Costa do Sol
1982	Maxaquene	1-0	Ferroviário de Maputo
1983	Costa do Sol	1-0	Textáfrica
1984	Ferroviário de Maputo	4-2	Palmeiras de Beira
1985	not disputed
1986	Maxaquene	2-0	Estrela Vermelha
1987	Maxaquene	3-0	Palmeiras de Beira
1988	Costa do Sol	1-0	Aguia d'Ouro
1989	Ferroviário de Maputo	2-0	Desportivo de Maputo
1990	Matchedje Maputo	3-1	Maxaquene
1991	Clube de Gaza	2-1 (after extra-time)	Maxaquene
1992	Costa do Sol	4-1 (after extra-time)	Clube de Gaza
1993	Costa do Sol	2-0	Ferroviário de Beira
1994	Maxaquene	1-0	Ferroviário de Maputo
1995	Costa do Sol	2-1	Maxaquene
1995/96	Maxaquene	2-1	GD da Companhia Têxtil do Punguè
1996/97	Costa do Sol	5-2	Migração (Beira)
1997/98	Maxaquene	1-0	Ferroviário de Maputo
1998/99	Costa do Sol	5-0	Sporting Clube de Nampula
1999/2000	Costa do Sol	1-0	Matchedje Maputo
2000/01	Maxaquene	3-1	Textáfrica
2001/02	Costa do Sol	2-0	Académica de Maputo
2003	Ferroviário de Nampula	1-1 (py 5-4)	Ferroviário de Maputo
2004	Ferroviário de Maputo	5-1	Textáfrica
2005	Ferroviário de Beira	1-0 (after extra-time)	Costa do Sol
2006	Desportivo de Maputo	1-0	Têxtil Punguè
2007	Costa do Sol	3-0	Ferroviário de Nampula
2008	Atlético Muçulmano	1-0	Chingale de Tete
2009	Ferroviário de Maputo	2-0	Costa do Sol
2010	Maxaquene	2-0	Vilankulo F.C.
2011	Ferroviário de Maputo	3-0	Chingale de Tete
2012	Liga Muçulmana	1-0	Costa do Sol
2013	Ferroviário de Beira	2-0	FC Chibuto
2014	Ferroviário de Beira	1-0	Ferroviário de Maputo
2015	Liga Desportiva de Maputo	2-1	Ferroviário de Beira
2016	União Desportiva do Songo	3-1	Maxaquene
2017	Costa do Sol	1-0 (after extra-time)	União Desportiva do Songo
2018	Costa do Sol	1-1 (after extra-time; 4-2 (p))	Ferroviário de Beira
2019	União Desportiva do Songo	2-0	Ferroviário de Maputo
2020	not disputed
2021	not disputed
2022	Ferroviário de Maputo	1-0	Ferroviário de Beira
2023	Associação Black Bulls	2-1	União Desportiva do Songo
2024	Ferroviário de Maputo	2-1 (after extra-time)	União Desportiva do Songo

== Titles by team ==
Club	Titles
Costa do Sol	13
Maxaquene	8
Ferroviário de Maputo	7
Ferroviário de Beira	3
Desportivo de Maputo	2
Liga Desportiva de Maputo (formerly Liga Muçulmana)	2
União Desportiva do Songo	2
Clube de Gaza	1
Ferroviário de Nampula	1
Matchedje Maputo	1
Palmeiras de Beira	1
Atlético Muçulmano	1
