= Jerry Sitoe =

Mozambican footballer

Personal information
- Full name: Jeremias Jorge Sitoe
- Date of birth: 23 November 1990 (age 35)
- Place of birth: Maputo, Mozambique
- Height: 1.82 m (6 ft 0 in)
- Position: Forward

Team information
- Current team: ENH de Vilankulos

Senior career*
Years	Team	Apps	(Gls)
2007–2010	Ferroviário de Maputo	71	(41)
2010–2011	Liga Muçulmana	5	(2)
2011	Académica	1	(0)
2011–2012	Liga Muçulmana	0	(0)
2012	→ UTA Arad (loan)	9	(1)
2012–2013	Oeiras	12	(4)
2013	→ Beroe Stara Zagora (loan)	7	(1)
2013–2014	Panachaiki	6	(0)
2014	Liga Muçulmana		
2015–2016	UD Songo		
2017	Estrela Vermelha		
2018–	ENH de Vilankulos		

International career^{‡}
2006	Mozambique U-20	5	(3)
2006–2012	Mozambique	21	(4)
- * Club domestic league appearances and goals as of 29 January 2014 ‡ National team caps and goals as of 14 October 2012

Jeremias Jorge "Jerry" Sitoe (born 23 November 1990) is a Mozambiquan footballer who plays as a forward for ENH de Vilankulos.

He has also played for Académica in the Portuguese Primeira Liga, who he joined from Clube Ferroviário de Maputo in 2011. Despite only being 21 years of age, Sitoe has already won twenty caps for the Mozambique national team, scoring four goals.

== Club career ==
=== Clube Ferroviário de Maputo ===
Sitoe began his career with Ferroviário in the 2007 season, as the club finished seventh in the Moçambola. He was then part of the club's title-winning squad in 2008, scoring 9 goals in 23 matches to become the league's third top–scorer. Ferroviário retained the title in 2009, and Sitoe also had a successful season, scoring 16 goals in 26 matches becoming the league's top scorer. The club finished third in the league in 2010, with Sitoe scoring 16 goals and becoming the league's top scorer. and also reached the second round of the 2010 CAF Champions League. Sitoe played a key role in Ferroviário's success, scoring in the preliminary round first leg against Apache Club de Mitsamiouli in a 5–3 win on 12 February 2010. He then bagged a brace in the second leg in a 4–1 victory on 27 February, ensuring Ferroviário's progress to the second round. There, they met South African giants SuperSport United, with the forward scoring in the 2–0 second leg win on 3 April.

=== Liga Muçulmana de Maputo ===
Sitoe joined Liga Muçulmana, another Maputo-based club, ahead of the 2011 season. The club won the Moçambola for the second consecutive season, five points ahead of nearest rivals Maxaquene Maputo. Sitoe left the club during the 2011 season to join Académica of Portugal.

=== Académica ===
Sitoe signed for the club on 28 July 2011. Upon joining Académica, he was assigned the squad number 25. He made his debut for the club in a 2–0 loss to Gil Vicente FC on 27 August 2011. In January 2012, Sitoe was released by Académica along with midfielder Júlio César Oliveira Martins.

=== UTA Arad ===
After being released by the Briosa, Sitoe returned to Liga Muçulmana de Maputo. He was set to join Portuguese Liga de Honra side C.D. Trofense on a six-month loan deal in January 2012, but the move eventually broke down. Instead, Site joined Romanian Liga II side FC UTA Arad on loan in February 2012. Sitoe scored his only league goal for the club in a 3–0 victory over FC Chindia Târgoviște on 19 May 2012; he played his last game for UTA Arad a week later.

=== AD Oeiras ===
In July 2012 Sitoe went on trial with Serbian club FK Sloboda Užice, but a subsequent transfer failed to materialise and he returned to Liga Muçulmana. A month later he signed for Portuguese third-tier outfit AD Oeiras and pledged, "I'll try to [score] ten goals and, if possible, go to a club in a higher league". Sitoe scored on his Oeiras debut, a 2–2 draw at Oriental Lisboa on 2 September. He then found the net in his third appearance for the club, scoring the equaliser in a 1–1 draw at SC Farense on 30 September. Sitoe's seventh Oeiras appearance yielded his third goal for the club, a second-half winner in a 1–0 victory over CD Fátima on 11 November 2012. His next league goal came on 22 December 2012 against CD Ribeira Brava; despite having three players sent off, Oerias managed to secure a 2–2 draw. Sitoe's form for Oeiras attracted the interest of Primeira Liga side SC Olhanense, who invited the player for a trial on 24 January 2013. Sitoe accepted the offer of a trial, and featured in Olhanense's 2–0 friendly defeat to Angolan side Atlético Petróleos Luanda the same day, in a team largely made up of fellow triallists.

=== PFC Beroe ===
In March 2013 Sitoe joined top-flight Bulgarian side PFC Beroe Stara Zagora. He made his debut for the club on 16 March as a substitute in a 2–0 win at Etar 1924; following several further appearances, mainly from the substitutes' bench, Sitoe scored his first Beroe goal in a 2–1 win over Lokomotiv Plovdiv on 22 May.

=== Panachaiki ===
In August 2013 Sitoe became part of the ranks of Greek club Panachaiki.

== International career ==
Sitoe played for Mozambique's U-20 side at the 2006 Lusophony Games in Macau, held in October 2006. He scored a second-half hat-trick in a 5–0 win over East Timor in the group stage. Mozambique won the bronze medal in the tournament.

He then progressed to Mozambique's senior side, making two substitute appearances in 2006. Sitoe had to wait until 2009 for his next international caps. He played three games that year, including a late substitute appearance in a 1–0 win over Kenya on 6 September 2009, coming on for Tico-Tico.

2010 saw Sitoe play more of a role for Mozambique, playing four games. He played the full 90 minutes of the 3–0 friendly defeat to Portugal on 8 June 2010, before coming on as a substitute in a 1–0 win over Comoros on 9 October. On 4 June 2011 he again came on as a substitute in Mozambique's 3–0 loss to Zambia. He then played the full 90 minutes in a 1–0 win over Comoros on 11 November 2011, and scored Mozambique's second goal in a 4–0 win over the same opponent on 15 November.

=== International goals ===
Scores and results list Mozambique's goal tally first.

No	Date	Venue	Opponent	Score	Result	Competition
1.	23 April 2011	Estádio do Zimpeto, Maputo, Mozambique	Tanzania	1–0	2–0	Friendly
2.	23 April 2011	Estádio do Zimpeto, Maputo, Mozambique	Tanzania	2–0	2–0	Friendly
3.	15 November 2011	Estádio do Zimpeto, Maputo, Mozambique	Comoros	2–0	4–1	2010 FIFA World Cup qualification
4.	17 June 2012	Estádio do Zimpeto, Maputo, Mozambique	Tanzania	1–0	1–1 (8–7 p)	2013 Africa Cup of Nations qualification

== Honours ==
Ferroviário de Maputo

- Moçambola: 2008, 2009

Liga Desportiva

- Moçambola: 2010
