= 2021–22 CAF Champions League =

58th CAF Champions League season

2021–22 TotalEnergies CAF Champions League
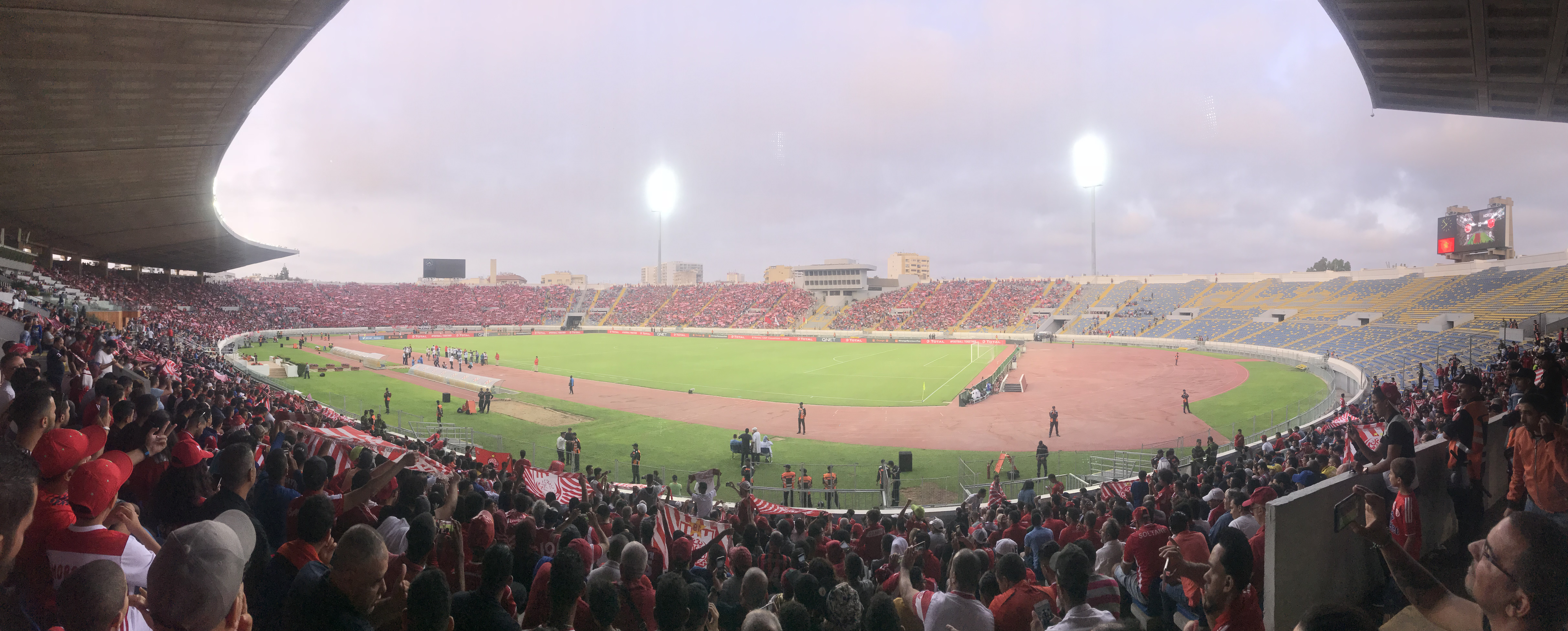
- Stade Mohammed V in Casablanca, Morocco, hosted the final.

Tournament details
- Dates: Qualification: 10 September – 24 October 2021; Main Competition: 11 February – 30 May 2022
- Teams: Main Competition: 16; Total: 54 (from 42 associations)

Final positions
- Champions: (Morocco) Wydad AC (3rd title)
- Runners-up: (Egypt) Al Ahly

Tournament statistics
- Matches played: 61
- Goals scored: 134 (2.2 per match)
- Top scorer(s): (Brazil) Tiago Azulão (6 goals)
- (Note: All statistics didn't include qualifying play-offs)

The 2021–22 CAF Champions League (known as the 2021–22 TotalEnergies CAF Champions League for sponsorship purposes) was the 58th season of Africa's premier club football tournament organized by the Confederation of African Football (CAF), and the 26th season under the current CAF Champions League title.

Wydad Casablanca won their 3rd title with a 2–0 win against the two-time defending champions, Al Ahly, in the final at Stade Mohammed V in Casablanca, Morocco, Wydad earned the right to play against RS Berkane, the winners of the 2021–22 CAF Confederation Cup, in the 2022 CAF Super Cup, As the first Super Cup to bring together two Moroccan clubs in history.

== Association team allocation ==
A total of 42 out of the 56 CAF member associations entered this season's CAF Champions League, with the 12 highest ranked associations according to their CAF 5-year ranking eligible to enter two teams in the competition. For this season, the CAF utilized the 2017–2021 CAF 5-year ranking, which calculated points for each entrant association based on their clubs' performance over those 5 years in the CAF club competitions. The criteria for points were as follows:

	CAF Champions League	CAF Confederation Cup
Winners	6 points	5 points
Runners-up	5 points	4 points
Losing semi-finalists	4 points	3 points
Losing quarter-finalists	3 points	2 points
3rd place in groups	2 points	1 point
4th place in groups	1 point	0.5 point

The points were multiplied by a coefficient according to the year as follows:

- 2020–21: x 5
- 2019–20: × 4
- 2018–19: × 3
- 2018: × 2
- 2017: × 1

== Teams ==
The following 54 teams from 42 out of the total 54 member associations entered this season's tournament.

- Teams in
- Bold received a bye to the second round.
- The other teams entered the first round.

Associations are shown according to their 2017–2021 CAF 5-year ranking – those with a ranking score have their rank and score (in parentheses) indicated.

Associations eligible to enter two teams (Top 12 associations)
Association	Rank (Pts)	Team	Qualifying method
Morocco	1 (183)	Wydad AC	2020–21 Botola champions
Morocco	1 (183)	Raja CA	2020–21 Botola runners-up
Egypt	2 (173.5)	Zamalek	2020–21 Egyptian Premier League first place after 29 rounds
Egypt	2 (173.5)	Al Ahly	Title holders; 2020–21 Egyptian Premier League second place after 29 rounds
Tunisia	3 (131)	Espérance de Tunis	2020–21 Tunisian Ligue Professionnelle 1 champions
Tunisia	3 (131)	Étoile du Sahel	2020–21 Tunisian Ligue Professionnelle 1 runners-up
Algeria	4 (109)	CR Belouizdad	2020–21 Algerian Ligue Professionnelle 1 first place after 35 rounds
Algeria	4 (109)	ES Sétif	2020–21 Algerian Ligue Professionnelle 1 second place after 35 rounds
South Africa	5 (93.5)	Mamelodi Sundowns	2020–21 South African Premier Division champions
South Africa	5 (93.5)	AmaZulu	2020–21 South African Premier Division runners-up
DR Congo	6 (75)	TP Mazembe	2020–21 Linafoot champions
DR Congo	6 (75)	AS Maniema Union	2020–21 Linafoot runners-up
Guinea	7 (38)	Horoya AC	2020–21 Guinée Championnat National champions
Guinea	7 (38)	CI Kamsar	2020–21 Guinée Championnat National runners-up
Nigeria	8 (37.5)	Akwa United	2020–21 Nigeria Professional Football League champions
Nigeria	8 (37.5)	Rivers United	2020–21 Nigeria Professional Football League runners-up
Zambia	9 (35)	ZESCO United	2020–21 Zambian Super League champions
Zambia	9 (35)	Zanaco	2020–21 Zambian Super League runners-up
Angola	10 (31.5)	Sagrada Esperança	2020–21 Girabola champions
Angola	10 (31.5)	Petro de Luanda	2020–21 Girabola runners-up
Sudan	11 (30)	Al Hilal	2020–21 Sudan Premier League champions
Sudan	11 (30)	Al Merrikh	2020–21 Sudan Premier League runners-up
Tanzania	12 (27.5)	Simba	2020–21 Tanzanian Premier League champions
Tanzania	12 (27.5)	Young Africans	2020–21 Tanzanian Premier League runners-up

Associations eligible to enter one team
Association	Rank (Pts)	Team	Qualifying method
Cameroon	13 (16)	Fovu de Baham	2020–21 Elite One first place by 8 August 2021
Senegal	14 (15)	Teungueth	2020–21 Senegal Premier League champions
Libya	15 (13.5)	Al Ittihad	2020–21 Libyan Premier League champions
Ivory Coast	16 (9)	ASEC Mimosas	2020–21 Côte d'Ivoire Ligue 1 champions
Kenya	17 (8)	Tusker	2020–21 FKF Premier League first place by 30 June 2021
Zimbabwe	17 (8)	FC Platinum	2020 Zimbabwe Premier Soccer League champions
Congo	19 (5.5)	AS Otohô	2021 Congo Premier League champions
Mali	20 (5)	Stade Malien	2020–21 Malian Première Division champions
Mozambique	20 (5)	UD Songo	2019 Moçambola runners-up
Uganda	20 (5)	Express	2020–21 Uganda Premier League champions
Burkina Faso	23 (4)	AS SONABEL	2020–21 Burkinabé Premier League champions
Ghana	23 (4)	Hearts of Oak	2020–21 Ghana Premier League champions
Rwanda	23 (4)	APR	2020–21 Rwanda Premier League champions
Eswatini	26 (3)	Royal Leopards	2020–21 Eswatini Premier League champions
Benin	27 (2)	Loto-Popo	2020–21 Benin Premier League champions
Botswana	27 (2)	Jwaneng Galaxy	2019–20 Botswana Premier League champions
Ethiopia	27 (2)	Fasil Kenema	2020–21 Ethiopian Premier League champions
Mauritania	27 (2)	FC Nouadhibou	2020–21 Ligue 1 Mauritania champions
Togo	27 (2)	ASKO Kara	2020–21 Togolese Championnat National champions
Gabon	32 (0.5)	AS Bouenguidi	2020–21 Gabon Championnat National D1 champions
Burundi	—	Le Messager Ngozi	2020–21 Burundi Premier League champions
Central African Republic	—	DFC 8ème	2020–21 Central African Republic League champions
Djibouti	—	Arta/Solar7	2020–21 Djibouti Premier League champions
Equatorial Guinea	—	Akonangui	2020–21 Equatoguinean Primera División champions
Gambia	—	Fortune FC	2020–21 GFA League First Division champions
Liberia	—	LPRC Oilers	2020–21 Liberian First Division champions
Malawi	—	Nyasa Big Bullets	2020–21 Super League of Malawi first place by 1 August 2021
Niger	—	USGN	2020–21 Niger Premier League champions
Somalia	—	Mogadishu City	2020–21 Somali First Division champions
Zanzibar	—	KMKM	2020–21 Zanzibar Premier League champions

Associations which did not enter a team

- Cape Verde
- Chad
- Comoros
- Eritrea
- Guinea-Bissau
- Lesotho
- Madagascar
- Mauritius
- Namibia
- Réunion
- São Tomé and Príncipe
- Seychelles
- Sierra Leone
- South Sudan

Notes:

1. Algeria (ALG): The 2020–21 Algerian Ligue Professionnelle 1 didn't conclude by the CAF deadline. As a result, the Algerian Football Federation announced that CR Belouizdad and ES Sétif, who were at positions 1 and 2 respectively in the league table after 35 rounds, would represent Algeria in the 2021–22 CAF Champions League.
2. Botswana (BOT): The 2020–21 Botswana Premier League was cancelled due to the COVID-19 pandemic in Botswana. As a result, the Botswana Football Association announced that Jwaneng Galaxy, who were champions of the previous season, will represent Botswana in the 2021–22 CAF Champions League.
3. Cameroon (CMR): The 2020–21 Elite One didn't conclude by the CAF deadline. As a result, the Cameroonian Football Federation announced that Fovu de Baham, who were at first place by 8 August 2021, will represent Cameroon in the 2021–22 CAF Champions League.
4. Egypt (EGY): The 2020–21 Egyptian Premier League didn't conclude by the CAF deadline. As a result, the Egyptian Football Association announced that Zamalek and Al Ahly, who were at positions 1 and 2 respectively on the league table after 29 rounds, will represent Egypt in the 2021–22 CAF Champions League.
5. Kenya (KEN): The 2020–21 FKF Premier League didn't conclude by the CAF deadline. As a result, the Football Kenya Federation announced that Tusker, who were at first place on the league table on 30 June 2021, will represent Kenya in the 2021–22 CAF Champions League.
6. Malawi (MWI): The 2020–21 Super League of Malawi didn't conclude by the CAF deadline. As a result, the Football Association of Malawi announced that Nyasa Big Bullets, who were at first place by 1 August 2021, will represent Malawi in the 2021–22 CAF Champions League.
7. Mozambique (MOZ): The 2020 Moçambola didn't conclude by the CAF deadline. As a result, the Mozambican Football Federation announced that UD Songo, who finished as the runners-up in the 2019 Moçambola, will represent Mozambique in the 2021–22 CAF Champions League.

== Schedule ==
The schedule for this season's edtition of the tournament were as follows:

Schedule for 2021–22 CAF Champions League
Phase	Round	Draw date	First leg	Second leg
Qualification	First round	13 August 2021	10–12 September 2021	17–19 September 2021
Qualification	Second round	13 August 2021	15–17 October 2021	22–24 October 2021
Group stage	Matchday 1	28 December 2021	11–12 February 2022	
Group stage	Matchday 2	28 December 2021	18–19 February 2022	
Group stage	Matchday 3	28 December 2021	25–26 February 2022	
Group stage	Matchday 4	28 December 2021	11–12 March 2022	
Group stage	Matchday 5	28 December 2021	18–19 March 2022	
Group stage	Matchday 6	28 December 2021	1–2 April 2022	
Knockout stage	Quarter-finals	5 April 2022	15–16 April 2022	22–23 April 2022
Knockout stage	Semi-finals	5 April 2022	6–7 May 2022	13–14 May 2022
Knockout stage	Final	5 April 2022	30 May 2022 at Stade Mohammed V, Casablanca	

== Qualifying rounds ==
The draw for the qualifying rounds was held on 13 August 2021 at the CAF headquarters in Cairo, Egypt. In the qualifying rounds, each tie was played on a home-and-away two-legged basis. If the aggregate score is tied after the second leg, the away goals rule was applied, and if still tied, extra time won't be played, and the penalty shoot-out was used to determine the winner (Regulations III. 13 & 14).

=== First round ===
Team 1	Agg.	Team 2	1st leg	2nd leg
CI Kamsar (Guinea)	0–2 (Note: The match involving Guinean clubs were played over a single leg, and not in the Guinean territory due to the political and security situation in Guinea following the 2021 Guinean coup d'état.)	(Ghana) Hearts of Oak		
LPRC Oilers (Liberia)	4–2	(Togo) ASKO Kara	3–0	1–2
AS SONABEL (Burkina Faso)	0–4	(Mali) Stade Malien	0–1	0–3
USGN (Niger)	2–1	(Burundi) Le Messager Ngozi	1–1	1–0
KMKM (Zanzibar)	0–4	(Libya) Al Ittihad	0–2	0–2
Arta/Solar7 (Djibouti)	1–4	(Kenya) Tusker	1–1	0–3
Mogadishu City (Somalia)	1–2	(Rwanda) APR	0–0	1–2
AS Bouenguidi (Gabon)	1–3	(Democratic Republic of the Congo) AS Maniema Union	1–1	0–2
AmaZulu (South Africa)	3–2	(Malawi) Nyasa Big Bullets	0–1	3–1
Jwaneng Galaxy (Botswana)	2–1	(Central African Republic) DFC 8ème	2–0	0–1
Young Africans (Tanzania)	0–2	(Nigeria) Rivers United	0–1	0–1
Fasil Kenema (Ethiopia)	3–3 (a)	(Sudan) Al Hilal	2–2	1–1
Teungueth (Senegal)	0–2	(Ivory Coast) ASEC Mimosas	0–1	0–1
Akwa United (Nigeria)	1–2	(Algeria) CR Belouizdad	1–0	0–2
UD Songo (Mozambique)	1–1 (3–4 p)	(Republic of the Congo) AS Otohô	1–0	0–1
Fovu de Baham (Cameroon)	2–2 (a)	(Angola) Petro de Luanda	2–2	0–0
Loto-Popo (Benin)	1–3	(Mauritania) FC Nouadhibou	1–1	0–2
Fortune FC (The Gambia)	3–3 (4–5 p)	(Algeria) ES Sétif	3–0	0–3
Sagrada Esperança (Angola)	0–0 (5–4 p)	(Zimbabwe) FC Platinum	0–0	0–0
Royal Leopards (Eswatini)	2–2 (a)	(Zambia) ZESCO United	1–0	1–2
Express (Uganda)	2–2 (a)	(Sudan) Al Merrikh	2–1	0–1
Akonangui (Equatorial Guinea)	0–3	(Zambia) Zanaco	0–2	0–1

=== Second round ===
The 16 winners of the second round advanced to the group stage, while the 16 losers of the second round entered the Confederation Cup play-off round.

Team 1	Agg.	Team 2	1st leg	2nd leg
Hearts of Oak (Ghana)	2–6	(Morocco) Wydad AC	1–0	1–6
LPRC Oilers (Liberia)	0–4	(Morocco) Raja Casablanca	0–2	0–2
Stade Malien (Mali)	1–3	(Guinea) Horoya	0–1	1–2
USGN (Niger)	2–7	(Egypt) Al Ahly	1–1	1–6
Al Ittihad (Libya)	0–1	(Tunisia) Espérance de Tunis	0–0	0–1
Tusker (Kenya)	0–5	(Egypt) Zamalek	0–1	0–4
APR (Rwanda)	1–5	(Tunisia) Étoile du Sahel	1–1	0–4
AS Maniema Union (Democratic Republic of the Congo)	2–4	(South Africa) Mamelodi Sundowns	2–2	0–2
AmaZulu (South Africa)	1–1 (a)	(Democratic Republic of the Congo) TP Mazembe	0–0	1–1
Jwaneng Galaxy (Botswana)	3–3 (a)	(Tanzania) Simba	0–2	3–1
Rivers United (Nigeria)	1–2	(Sudan) Al Hilal	1–1	0–1
ASEC Mimosas (Ivory Coast)	3–3 (a)	(Algeria) CR Belouizdad	3–1	0–2
AS Otohô (Republic of the Congo)	2–4	(Angola) Petro de Luanda	2–2	0–2
FC Nouadhibou (Mauritania)	3–3 (a)	(Algeria) ES Sétif	3–1	0–2
Sagrada Esperança (Angola)	3–2	(Eswatini) Royal Leopards	3–1	0–1
Al Merrikh (Sudan)	4–2	(Zambia) Zanaco	3–0	1–2

== Group stage ==
In the group stage, each group was played on a home-and-away round-robin basis. The winners and runners-up of each group advanced to the quarter-finals of the knockout stage.

Tiebreakers
The teams were ranked according to points (3 points for a win, 1 point for a draw, 0 points for a loss). If tied on points, tiebreakers were applied in the following order (Regulations III. 20 & 21):
1. Points in head-to-head matches among tied teams;
2. Goal difference in head-to-head matches among tied teams;
3. Goals scored in head-to-head matches among tied teams;
4. Away goals scored in head-to-head matches among tied teams;
5. If more than two teams were tied, and after applying all head-to-head criteria above, a subset of teams were still tied, all head-to-head criteria above were reapplied exclusively to this subset of teams;
6. Goal difference in all group matches;
7. Goals scored in all group matches;
8. Away goals scored in all group matches;
9. Drawing of lots.

=== Group A ===
Pos	Team	Pld	W	D	L	GF	GA	GD	Pts	Qualification	MSD	AHL	HIL	MER
1	(South Africa) Mamelodi Sundowns	6	5	1	0	10	2	+8	16	Advance to knockout stage	—	1–0	1–0	3–0
2	(Egypt) Al Ahly	6	3	1	2	7	5	+2	10	Advance to knockout stage	0–1	—	1–0	3–2
3	(Sudan) Al Hilal	6	1	1	4	4	8	−4	4 (Note: Head-to-head points: Al Hilal 3, Al Merrikh 3. Head-to-head goal differences: Al Hilal 0, Al Merrikh 0. Head-to-head away goals: Al Hilal 1, Al Merrikh 0)		2–4	0–0	—	1–0
4	(Sudan) Al Merrikh	6	1	1	4	5	11	−6	4		0–0	1–3	2–1	—

Source: CAF

=== Group B ===
Pos	Team	Pld	W	D	L	GF	GA	GD	Pts	Qualification	RCA	ESS	AMZ	HOR
1	(Morocco) Raja CA	6	5	0	1	7	2	+5	15	Advance to knockout stage	—	1–0	1–0	1–0
2	(Algeria) ES Sétif	6	3	0	3	6	5	+1	9	Advance to knockout stage	0–1	—	2–0	3–2
3	(South Africa) AmaZulu	6	2	1	3	3	6	−3	7		0–2	1–0	—	1–0
4	(Guinea) Horoya	6	1	1	4	5	8	−3	4		2–1	0–1	1–1	—

Source: CAF

=== Group C ===
Pos	Team	Pld	W	D	L	GF	GA	GD	Pts	Qualification	EST	CRB	ESS	GAL
1	(Tunisia) Espérance de Tunis	6	4	2	0	12	2	+10	14	Advance to knockout stage	—	2–1	0–0	4–0
2	(Algeria) CR Belouizdad	6	3	2	1	10	5	+5	11	Advance to knockout stage	1–1	—	2–0	4–1
3	(Tunisia) Étoile du Sahel	6	1	3	2	4	7	−3	6		0–2	0–0	—	3–2
4	(Botswana) Jwaneng Galaxy	6	0	1	5	5	17	−12	1		0–3	1–2	1–1	—

Source: CAF

=== Group D ===
Pos	Team	Pld	W	D	L	GF	GA	GD	Pts	Qualification	WAC	PET	ZAM	SAG
1	(Morocco) Wydad AC	6	5	0	1	15	5	+10	15	Advance to knockout stage	—	5–1	3–1	3–0
2	(Angola) Petro de Luanda	6	3	2	1	9	8	+1	11	Advance to knockout stage	2–1	—	0–0	3–0
3	(Egypt) Zamalek	6	0	4	2	3	6	−3	4		0–1	2–2	—	0–0
4	(Angola) Sagrada Esperança	6	0	2	4	1	9	−8	2		1–2	0–1	0–0	—

Source: CAF

== Knockout stage ==
The mechanism of the draws for each round was as follows:

- In the draw for the quarter-finals, the four group winners were seeded, and the four group runners-up were unseeded. The seeded teams were drawn against the unseeded teams, with the seeded teams hosting the second leg. Teams from the same group cannot be drawn against each other, while teams from the same association can be drawn against each other.
- In the draws for semi-finals, there were no seedings, and teams from the same group or the same association could be drawn against each other. As the draws for the quarter-finals and semi-finals were held together before the quarter-finals were played, the identity of the quarter-final winners was not known at the time of the semi-final draw.

Group	Winners	Runners-up
A	(South African Football Association) Mamelodi Sundowns	(Egyptian Football Association) Al Ahly
B	(Royal Moroccan Football Federation) Raja Casablanca	(Algerian Football Federation) ES Sétif
C	(Tunisian Football Federation) Espérance de Tunis	(Algerian Football Federation) CR Belouizdad
D	(Royal Moroccan Football Federation) Wydad AC	(Angolan Football Federation) Petro de Luanda

=== Bracket ===
The bracket was decided after the draw for the knockout stage, which was held on 5 April 2022.

Quarter-finals
(Egyptian Football Association) Al Ahly	2	1	3
(Royal Moroccan Football Federation) Raja Casablanca	1	1	2
(Algerian Football Federation) ES Sétif	0	1	1
(Tunisian Football Federation) Espérance de Tunis	0	0	0
(Angolan Football Federation) Petro de Luanda	2	1	3
(South African Football Association) Mamelodi Sundowns	1	1	2
(Algerian Football Federation) CR Belouizdad	0	0	0
(Royal Moroccan Football Federation) Wydad AC	1	0	1

Semi-finals
(Egyptian Football Association) Al Ahly	4	2	6
(Algerian Football Federation) ES Sétif	0	2	2
(Angolan Football Federation) Petro de Luanda	1	1	2
(Royal Moroccan Football Federation) Wydad AC	3	1	4

Final
30 May – Casablanca
(Egyptian Football Association) Al Ahly	0
(Royal Moroccan Football Federation) Wydad AC	2

=== Quarter-finals ===
Team 1	Agg.	Team 2	1st leg	2nd leg
Al Ahly (Egypt)	3–2	(Morocco) Raja Casablanca	2–1	1–1
ES Sétif (Algeria)	1–0	(Tunisia) Espérance de Tunis	0–0	1–0
CR Belouizdad (Algeria)	0–1	(Morocco) Wydad AC	0–1	0–0
Petro de Luanda (Angola)	3–2	(South Africa) Mamelodi Sundowns	2–1	1–1

=== Semi-finals ===
Team 1	Agg.	Team 2	1st leg	2nd leg
Al Ahly (Egypt)	6–2	(Algeria) ES Sétif	4–0	2–2
Petro de Luanda (Angola)	2–4	(Morocco) Wydad AC	1–3	1–1

=== Final ===
The final was played on 30 May 2022 at Stade Mohammed V, Casablanca.

30 May 2022
20:00 UTC+1

Al Ahly (Egypt)	0–2	(Morocco) Wydad AC
	Report	El Moutaraji 15', 48'

Stade Mohammed V, Casablanca
Attendance: 80,000
Referee: Victor Gomes (South Africa)

== Top goalscorers ==
Team eliminated / inactive for this round.

Rank	Player	Team	MD1	MD2	MD3	MD4	MD5	MD6	QF1	QF2	SF1	SF2	F	Total
1	(Brazil) Tiago Azulão	(Angola) Petro de Luanda		1	1	2			1	1				6
2	(Egypt) Mohamed Sherif	(Egypt) Al Ahly	2				1				1	1		5
2	(Morocco) Zouhair El Moutaraji	(Morocco) Wydad AC			1		1	1					2	5
4	(Tunisia) Mohamed Ali Ben Romdhane	(Tunisia) Espérance de Tunis	3			1								4
4	(Morocco) Yahya Jabrane	(Morocco) Wydad AC	1		1	1					1			4
4	(Algeria) Riad Benayad	(Algeria) ES Sétif				1	2					1		4
7	(Sudan) Elsamani Saadeldin	(Sudan) Al Merrikh	1		2									3
7	(Algeria) Kheireddine Merzougui	(Algeria) CR Belouizdad			2	1								3
7	(South Africa) Thapelo Morena	(South Africa) Mamelodi Sundowns			1		2							3
7	(Nigeria) Kingsley Eduwo	(Tunisia) Espérance de Tunis	1				2							3
7	(Botswana) Gilbert Baruti	(Botswana) Jwaneng Galaxy			1			2						3
7	(Republic of the Congo) Guy Mbenza	(Morocco) Wydad AC	1						1		1			3
7	(South Africa) Percy Tau	(Egypt) Al Ahly					1				2			3

== See also ==
- 2021–22 CAF Confederation Cup
- 2022 CAF Super Cup
- 2022 FIFA Club World Cup
