= District Championship of Lourenço Marques =

The District Championship of Lourenço Marques was a competition for association football clubs in the then officially Portuguese Province Mozambique and was held 40 times between 1922 ad 1961. Participants were the clubs of Lourenço Marques, today's Maputo, the capital of the country. Till the introduction of the national championship in 1956 this was the most important competition of Mozambique.

Ferroviário Lourenço Marques holds the record with 14 title wins, ahead of Desportivo and Sporting, today's CD Maxaquene, with 12 and 9 wins, respectively. The no longer existing clubs Athletic and Clube Indo-Português won two, respectively one of altogether 38 district championships awarded.

== Winners ==
- 1922: Sporting Clube de Lourenço Marques
- 1923: Athletic
- 1924: Clube Indo-Português
- 1925: Grupo Desportivo de Lourenço Marques
- 1926: Grupo Desportivo de Lourenço Marques
- 1927: Grupo Desportivo de Lourenço Marques
- 1928: Athletic
- 1929: Grupo Desportivo de Lourenço Marques
- 1930: Sporting Clube de Lourenço Marques
- 1931: Ferroviário Lourenço Marques
- 1932: Ferroviário Lourenço Marques
- 1933: Sporting Clube de Lourenço Marques
- 1934: Ferroviário Lourenço Marques
- 1935: Ferroviário Lourenço Marques
- 1936: Ferroviário Lourenço Marques
- 1937: Grupo Desportivo de Lourenço Marques
- 1938: Sporting Clube de Lourenço Marques
- 1939: Ferroviário Lourenço Marques
- 1940: Sporting Clube de Lourenço Marques
- 1941: -- no title awarded --
- 1942: Ferroviário Lourenço Marques
- 1943: Sporting Clube de Lourenço Marques
- 1944: Grupo Desportivo de Lourenço Marques
- 1945: Grupo Desportivo de Lourenço Marques
- 1946: Grupo Desportivo de Lourenço Marques
- 1947: Ferroviário Lourenço Marques
- 1948: Sporting Clube de Lourenço Marques
- 1949: Ferroviário Lourenço Marques
- 1950: Ferroviário Lourenço Marques
- 1951: Ferroviário Lourenço Marques
- 1952: Grupo Desportivo de Lourenço Marques
- 1953: Sporting Clube de Lourenço Marques
- 1954: Ferroviário Lourenço Marques
- 1955: Ferroviário Lourenço Marques
- 1956: Grupo Desportivo de Lourenço Marques
- 1957: Grupo Desportivo de Lourenço Marques
- 1958: Ferroviário Lourenço Marques
- 1959: Grupo Desportivo de Lourenço Marques
- 1960: Sporting Clube de Lourenço Marques
- 1961: -- no title awarded --
