= Costa do Sol =

Costa do Sol may refer to:

- Clube de Desportos da Costa do Sol, commonly known as Costa do Sol, a Mozambican sports club based in Maputo.
- Portuguese Riviera, also known as Costa do Sol, an affluent coastal region to the west of Lisbon, Portugal, centered on the coastal municipalities of Cascais (including Estoril, a famed luxury tourist destination in its own right) and Sintra.
