= Sitoe =

Sitoe is a surname of Mozambican origin. Notable people with the surname include:

- Edson André Sitoe (born 1988), known as Mexer, Mozambican footballer
- Jerry Sitoe (born 1990), Mozambiquan footballer
