= Desportivo Tete =

Football club in Tete, Mozambique

Desportivo de Tete is a traditional football (soccer) club based in Tete, west Mozambique.

Desportivo Tete were one of the five teams that took part in the inaugural edition of the post-independence Campeonato Nacional in 1976, for which they qualified by winning their provincial championship. They lost in the semi-final to the eventual winners, Textáfrica do Chimoio.

They reached the quarter-finals of the 2013 Taça de Moçambique.
