= 2021 Champions League =

2021 Champions League may refer to:

== Football ==
- 2020–21 UEFA Champions League
- 2021–22 UEFA Champions League
- 2021 AFC Champions League
- 2020–21 CAF Champions League
- 2021–22 CAF Champions League
