= Moçambola =

Mozambican football league

- Founded: 1976
- Country: Mozambique
- Confederation: CAF
- Number of clubs: 14
- Level on pyramid: 1
- Relegation to: Segunda Divisão
- Domestic cup: Taça de Moçambique Super Taça (Current champions AB Bulls)
- International cup(s): Champions League; Confederation Cup
- Current champions: UD Songo (2025)
- Most championships: Ferroviário Maputo (18)
- Current: 2026 Moçambola

Moçambola (or Campeonato Moçambicano de Futebol, Portuguese for Mozambican Football Championship) is the top division of Mozambican football. It is organized by the Liga Moçambicana de Futebol.

== History ==
In 1976, shortly after the country's independence from Portugal, the competition's first season was contested. Only five clubs took part: Académica Maputo, AD Pemba, Desportivo de Maputo, Desportivo Tete, and Textáfrica.

Until 2005, the competition was named Liga 2M. In 2005, the league was renamed to Moçambola.

== Competition format ==
The league consists of 12 clubs, with each team competing against each other team twice, round-robin style, for a total of 24 matches per season. The bottom two clubs in the league table are relegated to the second division. It currently takes place between the months of March/April and October.

== Moçambola – clubs 2022 ==
- Associação Black Bulls
- Costa do Sol (Maputo)
- Associação Desportiva de Vilankulos
- Incomati Xinavane
- Ferroviário Beira
- Ferroviario Lichinga
- Ferroviário Maputo
- Ferroviário Nacala
- Ferroviário Nampula
- Liga Desportiva de Maputo
- Matchedje Mocuba
- UD Songo (Songo)

== List of champions ==
Years	Champions
1976	Textáfrica do Chimoio (1)
1977	Desportivo de Maputo (1)
1978	Desportivo de Maputo (2)
1979	Costa do Sol (1)
1980	Costa do Sol (2)
1981	Têxtil do Punguè (1)
1982	Ferroviário Maputo (1)
1983	Desportivo de Maputo (3)
1984	Maxaquene (1)
1985	Maxaquene (2)
1986	Maxaquene (3)
1987	Matchedje (1)
1988	Desportivo de Maputo (4)
1989	Ferroviário Maputo (2)
1990	Matchedje (2)
1991	Costa do Sol (3)
1992	Costa do Sol (4)
1993	Costa do Sol (5)
1994	Costa do Sol (6)
1995	Desportivo de Maputo (5)
1996	Ferroviário Maputo (3)
1997	Ferroviário Maputo (4)
1998–99	Ferroviário Maputo (5)
1999–2000	Costa do Sol (7)
2000–01	Costa do Sol (8)
2002	Ferroviário Maputo (6)
2003	Maxaquene (4)
2004	Ferroviário Nampula (1)
2005	Ferroviário Maputo (7)
2006	Desportivo Maputo (6)
2007	Costa do Sol (9)
2008	Ferroviário Maputo (8)
2009	Ferroviário Maputo (9)
2010	Liga Desportiva (1)
2011	Liga Desportiva (2)
2012	Maxaquene (5)
2013	Liga Desportiva (3)
2014	Liga Desportiva (4)
2015	Ferroviário Maputo (10)
2016	Ferroviário da Beira (1)
2017	UD Songo (1)
2018	UD Songo (2)
2019	Costa do Sol (10)
2020–21	Associação Black Bulls (1)
2022	UD Songo (3)
2023	Ferroviário da Beira (2)
2024	Associação Black Bulls (2)
2025	UD Songo (4)

== Qualification for CAF competitions ==
=== Association ranking for the 2025–26 CAF club season ===
The association ranking for the 2025–26 CAF Champions League and the 2025–26 CAF Confederation Cup will be based on results from each CAF club competition from 2020–21 to the 2024–25 season.

Legend

- CL: CAF Champions League
- CC: CAF Confederation Cup
- ≥: Associations points might increase on basis of its clubs performance in 2024–25 CAF club competitions
- Associations ranked 1–12 are eligible to enter two teams in each CAF club competition.

Rank			Association	2020–21 (× 1)		2021–22 (× 2)		2022–23 (× 3)		2023–24 (× 4)		2024–25 (× 5)		Total
2025	2024	Mvt	Association	CL	CC	CL	CC	CL	CC	CL	CC	CL	CC	Total
1	1	—	Egypt	8	3	7	4	8	2.5	7	7	10	4	190.5
2	2	—	Morocco	4	6	9	5	8	2	2	4	5	5	142
3	4	+1	South Africa	8	2	5	4	4	3	4	1.5	9	3	131
4	3	-1	Algeria	6	5	7	1	6	5	2	3	5	5	130
5	6	+1	Tanzania	3	0.5	0	2	3	4	6	0	2	4	82.5
6	5	-1	Tunisia	4	3	5	1	4	2	6	1	3	0.5	82.5
7	8	+1	Angola	1	0	5	0	2	0	3	1.5	2	2	55
8	7	-1	DR Congo	4	0	0	3	1	2	4	0	2	0	45
9	9	—	Sudan	3	0	3	0	3	0	2	0	3	0	41
10	11	+1	Ivory Coast	0	0	0	1	0	3	3	0	1	2	38
11	10	-1	Libya	0	0.5	0	5	0	0.5	0	3	0	0	24
12	12	—	Nigeria	0	2	0	0	0	2	0	2	0	1	21
13	15	+2	Mali	0	0	0	0	0	1	0	2	1	0.5	18.5
14	14	—	Ghana	0	0	0	0	0	0	1	3	0	0	16
15	13	-2	Guinea	2	0	1	0	2	0	0	0.5	0	0	12
16	19	+3	Botswana	0	0	1	0	0	0	1	0	0	0.5	8.5
17	21	+4	Senegal	1	2	0	0	0	0	0	0	0	1	8
18	17	-1	Mauritania	0	0	0	0	0	0	2	0	0	0	8
19	18	-1	Congo	0	0	0	1	0	1	0	0.5	0	0	7
20	16	-4	Cameroon	0	3	0	0.5	1	0	0	0	0	0	7
21	22	+1	Togo	0	0	0	0	0	1	0	0	0	0	3
22	22	—	Uganda	0	0	0	0	1	0	0	0	0	0	3
23	-	new	Mozambique	0	0	0	0	0	0	0	0	0	0.5	2.5
24	20	-4	Zambia	0	1.5	0	0.5	0	0	0	0	0	0	2.5
25	24	-1	Eswatini	0	0	0	0.5	0	0	0	0	0	0	1
25	24	-1	Niger	0	0	0	0.5	0	0	0	0	0	0	1
27	26	-1	Burkina Faso	0	0.5	0	0	0	0	0	0	0	0	0.5

== Titles by team ==
Club	Titles	Years won
Ferroviário de Maputo	18	1956, 1961, 1963, 1966, 1967, 1968, 1970, 1972, 1982, 1989, 1996, 1997, 1999, 2002, 2005, 2008, 2009, 2015
Costa do Sol	10	1979, 1980, 1991, 1992, 1993, 1994, 2000, 2001, 2007, 2019
Desportivo de Maputo	8	1957, 1964, 1977, 1978, 1983, 1988, 1995, 2006
Maxaquene	7	1960, 1962, 1984, 1985, 1986, 2003, 2012
G.D.R. Textáfrica	4	1969, 1971, 1973, 1976
Liga Desportiva	4	2010, 2011, 2013, 2014
Ferroviário Beira	4	1958, 1974, 2016, 2023
UD Songo	4	2017, 2018, 2022, 2025
Matchedje Maputo	2	1987, 1990
Associação Black Bulls	2	2021, 2024
Sporting Nampula	1	1959
Têxtil Punguè	1	1981
Ferroviário de Nampula	1	2004

== Top goalscorers ==
Season	Player	Team	Goals
1960	(Portugal) Eusebio	Sporting Lourenço Marques	16
2002	(Mozambique) Genito	CD Maxaquene	11
2004	(Mozambique) Ruben	Ferroviário da Beira	
2005	(Mozambique) Maurício Pequenino	Desportivo de Maputo	14
2006	(Mozambique) Maurício Pequenino	Desportivo de Maputo	11
2007	(Mozambique) Tó	CD Costa do Sol	16
2008	(Mozambique) Luis	Ferroviário de Maputo	15
2009	(Mozambique) Jerry Sitoe	Ferroviário de Maputo	16
2010	(Mozambique) Jerry Sitoe	Ferroviário de Maputo	16
2011	(Mozambique) Betinho	CD Maxaquene	15
2012	(Mozambique) Sonito	Liga Desportiva	9
2014	(Mozambique) Isac de Carvalho	CD Maxaquene	13
2016	(Mozambique) Luís Miquissone	UD Songo	15
2017	(Mozambique) Telinho	Liga Muçulmana	17
2018	(Mozambique) Telinho	Liga Muçulmana	11
2019	(Cameroon) Bienvenu Eva Nga	Costa do Sol	24
2021	(Nigeria) Ejaita Ifoni	AB Bulls	15
2022	(Mozambique) Lau King	UD Songo	9
2022	(Mozambique) Isac	Ferroviário de Nampula	9
2023	(Mozambique) Dayo António	UD Songo	12
2024	(Mozambique) Kadre	Black Bulls	14
2025	(Mozambique) Luís Miquissone	UD Songo	15

=== Multiple hat-tricks ===
Rank	Country	Player	Hat-tricks
1	(Mozambique)	Dayo António	2
2	(Mozambique)	Betinho	1
2	(Mozambique)	Cantolo	1
2	(Mozambique)	Chester	1
2	(Mozambique)	Fortinho	1
2	(Mozambique)	Lau King	1
2	(Mozambique)	Luís Miquissone	1
2	(Mozambique)	Parkim	1
