= Estádio 25 de Junho =

Multi-purpose stadium in Nampula, Mozambique

- Interactive map of Estádio 25 de Junho
- Address: Nampula; Mozambique
- Coordinates: 15°6′31.52″S 39°15′39.98″E
- Capacity: 4,000
- Current use: Home pitch for Clube Ferroviário de Nampula

Estádio 25 de Junho (25 June Stadium) is a multi-purpose stadium in Nampula, Mozambique. It is currently used mostly for football matches and is the home stadium of the Clube Ferroviário de Nampula. The stadium holds 4,000 people.
