= Dayo António =

Mozambican association football player

Personal information
- Full name: Dayo Domingos António
- Date of birth: 20 August 1995 (age 31)
- Place of birth: Dondo, Mozambique
- Height: 1.77 m (5 ft 10 in)
- Position: Striker

Team information
- Current team: Ferroviário da Beira
- Number: 17

Senior career*
Years	Team	Apps	(Gls)
2014	Ferroviário da Beira		
2014–2016	AS Vita Club		
2016–	Ferroviário da Beira	95	(51)

International career^{‡}
2016–	Mozambique	26	(4)
- * Club domestic league appearances and goals ‡ National team caps and goals as of 20 August 2026

Dayo Domingos António (born 20 August 1995), or simply known as Dayo, is a Mozambican footballer who plays as a striker for Ferroviário da Beira in the Moçambola.

== Career statistics ==
=== International ===
As of match played 9 June 2026

Appearances and goals by national team and year
National team	Year	Apps	Goals
Mozambique	2016	2	0
Mozambique	2017	2	1
Mozambique	2018	4	0
Mozambique	2019	5	2
Mozambique	2020	–	
Mozambique	2021	5	0
Mozambique	2022	2	0
Mozambique	2023	3	1
Mozambique	2024	–	
Mozambique	2025	1	0
Mozambique	2026	2	0
Total		26	4

Scores and results list Mozambique's goal tally first, score column indicates score after each António goal.

List of international goals scored by Dayo António
No.	Date	Venue	Opponent	Score	Result	Competition
1	28 March 2017	Estádio Chiveve, Beira, Mozambique	Lesotho	1–0	1–0	Friendly
2	10 March 2019	Tuks Stadium, Pretoria, South Africa	Eswatini	1–1	1–1	Friendly
3	3 August 2019	Estádio do Zimpeto, Maputo, Mozambique	Madagascar	1–0	3–2	2020 African Nations Championship qualification
