= CD Maxaquene =

Mozambique sports club

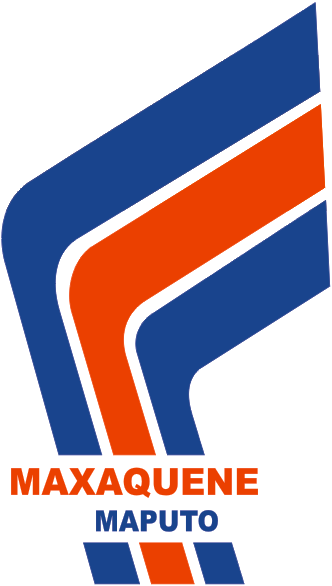
- Full name: Clube de Desportos do Maxaquene
- Nickname: Maxaca
- Founded: 20 May 1920
- Ground: Estádio do Maxaquene; Maputo, Mozambique
- Capacity: 15.000
- Chairman: Quintino Augusto de Jesus Mkhululi
- Manager: Epitácio Mucanga
- League: Moçambola
- 2019: 12th (relegation)
- Website: maxaquene.co.mz
Home colours	Away colours

Clube de Desportos do Maxaquene, usually known simply as Maxaquene, is a sports club based in Maputo, Mozambique. The club is nicknamed Maxaca. Currently, besides association football there are two indoor sports, namely, basketball (CD Maxaquene Basketball) and handball. In such sports Maxaquene is the club with the most national titles after independence. Maxaquene won its first post-independence title in football, the Taça de Moçambique, in 1978. Prior to Mozambique's independence from Portugal in 1975, CD Maxaquene were known as Sporting Clube de Lourenço Marques or simply Sporting de Lourenço Marques (Lourenço Marques being the name for Maputo before independence), and was the branch number 6 of Lisbon-based Sporting Clube de Portugal (Sporting CP). Under this name, both the legendary Eusébio and Hilário, played for the club.

== History ==
=== Colonial Mozambique ===
The origins of Sporting Clube de Lourenço Marques can be traced back to 1915, when a group of students from Liceu 5 de Outubro high school, in the city of Lourenço Marques - former name of Maputo and capital of the then Portuguese overseas province of Mozambique - formed a football team, which they decided to call Sporting, because most of them were supporters of Sporting Clube de Portugal. On 3 May 1920, considered in the statutes to be the club's official founding date, twenty founding members held a general meeting where the statutes were approved, whose approval was requested from the governor general on the 15th of that month and granted on 21 July 1920. In March 1923, Aurélio Galhardo began negotiations with the Mozambican club to make it a branch of Lisbon-based club Sporting Clube de Portugal. Sporting Clube de Lourenço Marques thus became the branch number 6 of Sporting Clube de Portugal, and remained so until 1975. The club's symbol and players' equipment were identical to those of Sporting CP, with the letters SCLM in place of SCP.

In other sports besides football, Sporting Clube de Lourenço Marques won the Portuguese Basketball League three times, in 1968, 1971 and 1973.

==== Inclusiveness record in Colonial Mozambique ====
In the first decades of the club's history, for black players to play for Sporting de Lourenço Marques, they either had to be players of a rare, clearly perceived outstanding talent or they had to have someone to sponsor them. The club's leaders and players came mainly from the police and the Municipalized Water and Electricity Service, the city's utilities. However, this was the result, not of a decision by Sporting de Lourenço Marques, but of a "ban on the use of blacks without an assimilation licence" in football, since those population was often deemed tribal or indigent and was largely illiterate and usually unable to speak fluent Portuguese. In fact, José Craveirinha, one of Mozambique's greatest poets and a major figure in Portuguese-language literature, who was awarded the Camões Prize in 1991, praised "the outburst of pure and unbridled sportsmanship" that the "absolutely unique case" of "the presentation on the athletics tracks of some pure black athletes wearing the very susceptible, until then, local Sporting jersey" represented in the 1951–52 season. People of diverse ethnic backgrounds, such as the Sino-Mozambicans from Lourenço Marques, also played sport for Sporting.

Also in the 1950s, Eusébio tried to enlist with some friends for the team Desportivo de Lourenço de Marques, his favourite team and a Benfica feeder team that shared with Lisbon-based Benfica identical symbols and motto and was a branch of Benfica until 1954, also the team where Mário Coluna had played before his move to Benfica, but was rejected, without even being given a chance to prove his worth. He was also rejected by Ferroviário de Lourenço Marques. He then tried his luck with Sporting Clube de Lourenço Marques, the branch number 6 (filial número 6) of Lisbon-based Sporting CP, and Sporting Lourenço Marques accepted him as well as a group of his friends who lived in Eusébio's neighbourhood. There he would have his first training sessions supervised by a coaching staff, receive his first ever football equipment and play competitive football in an organized way at both youth level and the main senior team before moving to Lisbon. From 1957 to 1960, Eusébio scored a total of 77 goals in 42 appearances playing for the main team of Sporting Lourenço Marques. While playing there, he won the Campeonato Provincial de Moçambique and the Campeonato Distrital de Lourenço Marques in his last season with the club, in 1960.

=== Independent Mozambique ===
In 1975, after Mozambique's independence, it became Sporting Clube de Maputo, and in 1977 it took on its current name - Clube de Desportos da Maxaquene. Between December 1981 and February 1982, the club was called Asas de Moçambique, returning its name to Clube de Desportos da Maxaquene after three months as Asas. Maxaquene won its first post-independence title in football, the Taça de Moçambique, in 1978.

== Name history ==
- 1920–76: Founded as Sporting Clube de Lourenço Marques; it was an affiliate club and feeder team of Lisbon-based Sporting Clube de Portugal.
- 1976–78: The club is renamed Sporting Clube de Maputo.
- 1978–present: The club is renamed Clube de Desportos Maxaquene. Between December 1981 and February 1982, the club took the name Asas de Moçambique.

== Stadium ==
The club plays their home matches at Estádio do Maxaquene, which has a maximum capacity of 15,000 people.

== Achievements ==
- Campeonato de Moçambique: (5)

1984, 1985, 1986, 2003, 2012

- Taça de Moçambique: (9)

1978, 1982, 1986, 1987, 1994, 1996, 1998, 2001, 2010

- Campeonato Provincial de Moçambique:

1960, 1962

- District Championship of Lourenço Marques: (9)

1922, 1930, 1933, 1938, 1940, 1943, 1948, 1953, 1960

- Taça de Honra de Maputo:

2006

== Performance in CAF competitions ==
- CAF Champions League: 1 appearance

2004 – First Round

- African Cup of Champions Clubs: 1 appearance

1987 – Preliminary Round

- CAF Confederation Cup: 1 appearance

2011 – Preliminary Round

- CAF Cup Winners' Cup: 8 appearances

1979 – First Round
1983 – First Round
1988 – First Round

1991 – First Round
1995 – Semi-finals
1997 – First Round

1999 – Second Round
2002 – First Round

- CAF Cup: 2 appearances

1998 – First Round
2003 – First Round

== Performance in African competitions ==
- CAF Champions League: 2 appearances

Best: 2003–04 Preliminary Round – Lost against Amazulu 7–4 on aggregate

- CAF Confederation Cup: 2 appearances

Best: 2002–03 First Round – Lost against Black Rhinos 1–1 on aggregate

- African Cup Winners' Cup: 6 appearances

Best: 1994–95 Semi-finals – Lost against Julius Berger 1–0 on aggregate

== Current squad ==
Note: Flags indicate national team as defined under FIFA eligibility rules; some limited exceptions apply. Players may hold more than one non-FIFA nationality.

No.	Pos.	Nation	Player
—	GK	MOZ	Soarito
—	DF	MOZ	Campira
—	DF	MOZ	Gabito
—	DF	ZIM	Eusebio
—	DF	MOZ	Vovote
—	DF	MOZ	Narciso
—	DF	MOZ	Fanuel
—	MF	ZIM	Liberty
—	MF	MOZ	Kito

No.	Pos.	Nation	Player
—	MF	MOZ	Dário Chissano
—	MF	RSA	Mfiki
—	MF	MOZ	Josemar
—	MF	MOZ	Genito
—	MF	RSA	Marvin Oakes
—	MF	MOZ	Paíto
—	FW	MOZ	Tony Afonso
—	FW	MOZ	Pelembe

== Former coaches ==
- (Portugal) Litos (2009)

== Notable players ==
- Hilário (born 1939), Portugal national football team player who started his career at Sporting Clube de Lourenço Marques before moving to Sporting Portugal.
- Eusébio (born 1942), who graduated as a footballer and played for the club at both youth level and the main squad between the ages of 12 and 18, and whose impact in Portuguese football stood out to such an extent that when Eusébio arrived in Lisbon in December 1960 still as a player of Sporting Lourenço Marques, Sporting CP, the Lisbon-based parent club of Sporting Lourenço Marques, had won ten league titles, which was as many as rival Benfica's, and when, 15 years later, Eusébio, recognised as Benfica's best player of all time, left Benfica, Benfica had won 21 championships to just 14 for Sporting CP. Although being a black player from Mozambique, he is considered one of the greatest Portuguese football players ever and his role in the 1966 FIFA World Cup is still remembered today as a significant milestone in Portugal's football history.
- Chiquinho Conde (born 1965), Mozambique national football team player and later manager, who started his career in the club.
- Geny Catamo (born 2001), youth team player of CD Maxaquene, that was his first club.
