= SC Nampula =

Sporting Clube
- Full name: Sporting Clube de Nampula
- Founded: 1948
- Ground: Nampula, Mozambique
- Manager: Sousa Augusto
- League: Moçambola

Sporting Clube de Nampula is a football (soccer) club from Nampula, Mozambique, playing in the top division in Mozambican football, Moçambola.

== Current squad ==
Note: Flags indicate national team as defined under FIFA eligibility rules; some limited exceptions apply. Players may hold more than one non-FIFA nationality.

No.	Pos.	Nation	Player
1	GK	(Mozambique) MOZ	Itai Meque
8	FW	(Mozambique) MOZ	Gaspar
9	GK	(Mozambique) MOZ	Fando
—	GK	(Mozambique) MOZ	Asdilho
—	DF	(Mozambique) MOZ	Octávio Carre
—	DF	(Mozambique) MOZ	Pinto Langa
—	DF	(Mozambique) MOZ	Alfredo Gamito
—	DF	(Mozambique) MOZ	José Mugalha
—	DF	(Mozambique) MOZ	Eugénio Âmido
—	DF	(Mozambique) MOZ	Higo
—	DF	(Mozambique) MOZ	Justao
—	MF	(Mozambique) MOZ	Lampo

No.	Pos.	Nation	Player
—	MF	(Mozambique) MOZ	Roque
—	MF	(Mozambique) MOZ	Cosme Manje
—	MF	(Mozambique) MOZ	Matsenho
—	MF	(Mozambique) MOZ	Maliquela
—	MF	(Mozambique) MOZ	Luís Domingos
—	MF	(Spain) ESP	Alcido Eduardo Ngwenha
—	FW	(Mozambique) MOZ	Jumulate
—	FW	(Mozambique) MOZ	Kassamo
—	FW	(Mozambique) MOZ	Abel Xavier
—	FW	(Mozambique) MOZ	Joaquim Veríssimo
—	FW	(Mozambique) MOZ	Carlos Siquir
