= GD Maputo =

Association football club in Mozambique

Desportivo de Maputo
- Full name: Grupo Desportivo de Maputo
- Founded: 1921; 104 years ago
- Ground: Estádio Nacional do Zimpeto; Maputo, Mozambique
- Capacity: 8,000; 42,000
- Manager: Dário Monteiro
- League: Moçambola
- 2019: 5th
Home colours	Away colours

Grupo Desportivo de Maputo, usually known as Desportivo de Maputo, Desportivo Maputo or by the acronym GDM, is an association football club from Maputo, Mozambique.

== History ==
The club was founded on May 31, 1921, as Grupo Desportivo de Lourenço Marques by Professor Sá Couto, José Maria Rodrigues, Alfredo Fragoso, Américo Costa, Martinho Carvalho Durão and Professor Cabanelas. It was an affiliate team of Lisbon-based Sport Lisboa e Benfica. In 1976, after Mozambique's independence from Portugal, the club was renamed to Grupo Desportivo de Maputo. The club's logo was also changed.

1925 Desportivo won the District Championship of Lourenço Marques, a competition held between 1922 and 1961. A further eleven wins followed. In 1957 Desportivo achieved its first of altogether eight Mozambican championships 1956, which was held first in 1956. The club won its last national championship in 2006. In 2012 Desportivo was relegated for the first time.

Most famous of all players from Desportivo is Mário Coluna, who won with Benfica amongst others the European Champion's Cup of 1961 and 1962 and achieved with Portugal the third place in the 1966 World Cup.

== Stadium ==
The club plays their home matches at Estádio Nacional do Zimpeto, which has a maximum capacity of 42,000 people.

== Club colors ==
The club colors are black and white.

== Achievements ==
=== Football ===
- Championship of Mozambique:

colonial era (2): 1957, 1964.
after independence (6): 1977, 1978, 1983, 1988, 1995, 2006.

- District Championship of Lourenço Marques: (12)

1925, 1926, 1927, 1929, 1937, 1944, 1945, 1946, 1952, 1956, 1957, 1959.

- Cup of Mozambique: (2)

1981, 2006.

- Honour Cup of Maputo: (2)

2007, 2008.

=== Roller Hockey ===
- Championship of Mozambique: (15)

1976, 1987, 1994, 1995, 1996, 1997, 1998, 1999, 2000, 2001, 2002, 2003, 2004, 2006, 2010.

- Championship of Portugal: (3)

1969, 1971, 1973.

== Performance in African competitions ==
- CAF Champions League: 1 appearance

2006–07: Last 32 - Lost against Mamelodi Sundowns (3–1 on aggregate)

- CAF Cup Winners' Cup: 1 appearance

1989–90: Semi-finals - Lost against BCC Lions (7–3 on aggregate)

== Current squad ==
Note: Flags indicate national team as defined under FIFA eligibility rules; some limited exceptions apply. Players may hold more than one non-FIFA nationality.

No.	Pos.	Nation	Player
1	GK	BRA	Caio
2	DF	MOZ	Mayunda
3	DF	MOZ	Sidique
4	DF	MOZ	Jotamo
5	DF	MOZ	Josue
6	DF	MOZ	Marito
7	MF	MOZ	Nelinho
8	MF	MOZ	Muandro
9	FW	MOZ	Pequenino
10	FW	MOZ	Nito

No.	Pos.	Nation	Player
11	MF	MOZ	Jair
12	FW	MOZ	Lalá
13	MF	MOZ	Geraldo
15	GK	MOZ	Victor
16	FW	MOZ	Lanito
17	DF	MOZ	Duda
19	MF	MOZ	Claúdio
22	FW	MOZ	Ivan António
24	GK	MOZ	Marcelino
28	DF	MOZ	Zeid

== Other sports ==
Besides football, Desportivo de Maputo also has other sports sections, such as athletics, basketball, five-a-side football, rink hockey, and swimming.
