= GD da Companhia Têxtil do Punguè =

Tèxtil do Pungué
- Full name: Grupo Desportivo da Companhia Têxtil do Punguè
- Founded: 1943
- Ground: Estádio Chiveve, Beira, Mozambique
- Capacity: 5,000
- League: Campeonato Provincial de Sofala
- 2014: Moçambola, 12th (relegated)
Home colours

Grupo Desportivo da Companha Têxtil do Punguè is a Mozambican football club based in Beira. They were relegated from the top division in Mozambican football, Moçambola, in 2014. Their home stadium is Estádio Chiveve.

Têxtil do Punguè was founded on 29 July 1943 and won the Mozambican national championship in 1981.

== Achievements ==
- Moçambola

1981

== Performance in CAF competitions ==
- CAF Champions League: 1 appearance

1981–82 First Round – Lost against Young Africans 4–1 on aggregate

- CAF Confederation Cup: 1 appearance

2007 Last 32 – Lost against Union Douala 6–0 on aggregate

- CAF Cup: 1 appearance

1997 – withdrew in First Round
