= CD Matchedje de Maputo =

Mozambique football club

Matchedje
- Full name: CD Matchedje de Maputo
- Founded: 1979
- Ground: Estádio da Machava; Maputo, Mozambique
- Capacity: 45,000
- Chairman: Evaristo Mwakikunga
- Manager: Domingos Chirindza
- League: Moçambola

CD Matchedje de Maputo, or simply Matchedje, is a Mozambique football club from Maputo which currently plays in the Mozambique Second Division.

In 1987 the team has won the Moçambola.

== Stadium ==
The club plays their home matches at the Estádio da Machava, which has a maximum capacity of 45,000 people.

== Achievements ==
- Moçambola
    - Winners (2): 1987, 1990

== Performance in African competitions ==
- CAF Champions League: 1 appearance

1988 African Cup of Champions Clubs -
