= Clube Ferroviário de Nacala =

Mozambican football club

Ferroviário
- Full name: Ferroviário de Nacala
- Founded: 1924
- Ground: Estádio de Nacala-a-Velha, Mozambique
- Capacity: 5,000
- Chairman: Gabriel Alberto Cossa
- Manager: Luís Jacinto Mavimbela Mavuso
- League: Moçambola
- 2025: 9th
Home colours	Away colours

Clube Ferroviário de Nacala is a Mozambican football club.

== Stadium ==
The club plays their home matches at Campo de Bella Vista, which has a maximum capacity of 5,000 people.

== Achievements ==
- Moçambola: 0

- Cup of Mozambique: 0

- Supertaça de Moçambique: 1

2015.

== Performance in CAF competitions ==
- African Cup of Champions Clubs: 1 appearance

1987: Preliminary Round

- CAF Cup Winners' Cup: 8 appearances

1979 – first round
1983 – first round
1988 – first round

1991 – first round
1995 – semi-finals
1997 – first round

- CAF Cup: 2 appearances

1998 – first round
2003 – first round

== Performance in African competitions ==
- CAF Champions League: 2 appearances

Best: 2003–04 Preliminary Round – Lost against AmaZulu 7 – 4 on aggregate

== Current squad ==
Note: Flags indicate national team as defined under FIFA eligibility rules; some limited exceptions apply. Players may hold more than one non-FIFA nationality.

No.	Pos.	Nation	Player
1	GK	MOZ	Alisio
2	DF	MOZ	Fanuel
3	DF	SEN	Diop
4	DF	MOZ	Campira
5	DF	MOZ	Salvador Algueq
6	DF	MOZ	Zuko
7	MF	MOZ	Turt
8	MF	MOZ	Petrido
9	FW	MOZ	Cafti
10	MF	MOZ	Paolo Combo
11	FW	MOZ	Multinho
12	GK	MOZ	Stanho
13	DF	MOZ	Portilho
14	MF	MOZ	Zastehno
15	DF	MOZ	Sustique

No.	Pos.	Nation	Player
16	MF	MOZ	Actimio
17	DF	MOZ	Zamfa
18	MF	MOZ	Zitil
19	DF	MOZ	Manohed
20	FW	MOZ	Loklo
21	DF	MOZ	Jerom
23	FW	MOZ	Mabui
24	MF	MOZ	Buzilho
25	DF	MOZ	Whiskey
26	FW	MOZ	Geraldo
27	FW	MOZ	Tony Vidao
28	FW	MOZ	Rutilho
29	FW	MOZ	Macanda
30	GK	MOZ	Zelde
