= Associação Black Bulls =

Association football club in Mozambique

- Full name: Associação Black Bulls
- Nickname: Black Bulls
- Founded: 2017; 9 years ago
- Ground: Estádio da Matola, Maputo
- Capacity: 5,000
- Chairman: Luís Junaide Lalgy
- Manager: Inácio Soares
- League: Moçambola
- 2025: 2nd
- Website: associacaoblackbulls.com
Home colours	Away colours

Associação Black Bulls is a Mozambican football club based in Maputo. Associação Black Bulls is the current champion of Moçambola.

The club made its debut in the first division Moçambola in 2020 after winning the South Group of the second division in the previous year. However, the COVID-19 pandemic forced the cancellation of the 2020 season four weeks in.

== History ==
The official debut of the 'Black Bulls in the first division was with a 2–1 victory over Clube Ferroviário de Nampula.

The club is currently constructing a new stadium that has 5,000 seats with a first class facilities such as restaurant, locker rooms, press conference room, trophy museum and a merchandise Shop

For the first time in club's history since its foundation in 2017, the club has won the Moçambola in 2021.

Inácio Soares was appointed as the club's new head coach for 2022 season.
