= Clube Ferroviário da Beira (football) =

Mozambican football club

Ferroviário da Beira
- Full name: Clube Ferroviário da Beira
- Founded: 1924
- Ground: Estádio do Ferroviário; Beira, Mozambique
- Capacity: 7,000
- Chairman: Valdemar Oliveira
- Manager: Euroflin da Graça
- League: Moçambola
- 2025: 3rd
Home colours	Away colours

Clube Ferroviário da Beira is a Mozambican football club based in Beira. They play in the top division in Mozambican football league Moçambola. Their home stadium is Estádio do Ferroviário. They were Moçambique Colonial Champions in 1974.

Ferroviário was founded in 1924.

== Crest ==
Former logo

Present logo

== Achievements ==
- Moçambola: 2

2016, 2023.

- Taça de Moçambique: 3

2005, 2013, 2014.

== Performance in CAF competitions ==
- CAF Confederation Cup: 2 appearances

2006 - First Round
2014 - First Round

- CAF Cup: 1 appearance

1999 - Second Round

- African Cup Winners' Cup: 1 appearance

1994 - First Round

== Current squad ==
Note: Flags indicate national team as defined under FIFA eligibility rules; some limited exceptions apply. Players may hold more than one non-FIFA nationality.

No.	Pos.	Nation	Player
1	GK	MOZ	Zé
3	DF	MOZ	Elísio
4	MF	MOZ	Carlitos
5	DF	MOZ	Kiki
6	DF	MOZ	Monis
7	MF	MOZ	Agostinho Júnior
8	MF	ZAM	Henry Anthony
9	FW	MOZ	Maninho
10	FW	MOZ	Mário
11	MF	RSA	Mfiki Mthimkulu
12	GK	ZIM	Willard Manyatera
13	MF	MOZ	Veloso
15	DF	TGA	David Atittabi

No.	Pos.	Nation	Player
17	MF	MOZ	Egídio
18	FW	MOZ	Djei
19	MF	MOZ	Issaca
21	MF	MOZ	Valter Mandava
22	MF	EGY	Maged Sabry
24	GK	MOZ	Luís
25	DF	MOZ	Edson
26	DF	MOZ	Abrão Cufa
27	FW	MOZ	Manuel
28	DF	MOZ	Renildo
29	FW	MOZ	Dayo
30	DF	MOZ	Emídio
