= Clube Ferroviário de Nampula =

Mozambican football club

Ferroviário de Nampula
- Full name: Clube Ferroviário de Nampula
- Nickname: Axinenes
- Founded: 1924
- Ground: Estádio 25 de Junho; Nampula, Mozambique
- Capacity: 4,000
- Chairman: Francisco Zefanias Chirrime
- Manager: Arnaldo Salvado
- League: Moçambola
- 2025: 11th
Home colours	Away colours

Clube Ferroviário de Nampula is a Mozambican football club based in Nampula. They play in the top division in Mozambican football, Moçambola. Their home stadium is Estádio do Nampula. From 1993 to 2002, Filipe Nhussi, the former President of Mozambique, served as president of the club.

== Achievements ==
- Moçambola

Winners (1): 2004

- Taça de Moçambique: 1

Winners (1): 2003
Runners-up (1): 2007

- Supertaça de Moçambique

Runners-up (3): 2004, 2005, 2008

== Performance in CAF competitions ==
- CAF Champions League: 1 appearance

2005 – Preliminary Round

- CAF Confederation Cup: 2 appearances

2004 – Preliminary Round
2008 – Preliminary Round

== Current squad ==
Note: Flags indicate national team as defined under FIFA eligibility rules; some limited exceptions apply. Players may hold more than one non-FIFA nationality.

No.	Pos.	Nation	Player
1	GK	MOZ	Rafinho (Captain)
2	DF	POR	Victor
3	DF	MOZ	Shocolinho
4	MF	MOZ	Dede
5	DF	MOZ	Dolinho
6	DF	MOZ	Lokiranho
7	FW	MOZ	Ratundo
8	MF	MOZ	Kviki
9	MF	MOZ	Mortul
10	FW	MOZ	Lokiranho
11	MF	MOZ	Nestelhoe
12	GK	MOZ	Derinho

No.	Pos.	Nation	Player
13	DF	MOZ	Pogalho
14	MF	MOZ	Tete
15	DF	MOZ	Zambo
16	MF	MOZ	Madilho
17	DF	ANG	Kolo
18	FW	MOZ	Fetelho
19	DF	MOZ	Smulinho
20	FW	MOZ	Progo
21	FW	MOZ	Ponde
22	GK	MOZ	Dino
23	FW	MOZ	Joga
—	MF	SOM	Abdinur Mohamud
