= GDR Textáfrica =

- Full name: Grupo Desportivo e Recreativo Textáfrica
- Founded: 1928 as Sport Club de Vila Pery
- Ground: Campo da Soalpo
- Capacity: 5,000
- League: Moçambola
- 2025: 12th (Relegated)

Grupo Desportivo e Recreativo Textáfrica, usually known simply as Textáfrica, is a traditional football (soccer) club based in Chimoio, central Mozambique.

== History ==
The club was founded in 1928 as Sport Club de Vila Pery. In 1957, it was refounded as Grupo Desportivo e Recreativo Textáfrica, a works team of a textile factory belonging to the Portuguese company SOALPO (Sociedade Algodoeira de Portugal). The club won the title of the second stage in 1969, with the title of the Campeonato Colonial de Moçambique. After the independence of Mozambique from Portugal, Textáfrica do Chimoio won the Mozambican League, in 1976.

== Stadium ==
The club plays their home matches at Campo da Soalpo, which has a maximum capacity of 5,000 people.

== Achievements ==
- Moçambola: 1

1976

- Campeonato Colonial de Moçambique: 3

1969, 1971, 1973

== Notable coaches ==
- (Brazil) Alex Alves (2009)
