= Liga Desportiva de Maputo =

Mozambican football club

- Full name: Liga Desportiva de Maputo
- Nickname: A Liga
- Founded: 1990
- Ground: Estádio Da Liga; Matola, Mozambique
- Capacity: 5,000
- Chairman: Rafik Sidat
- Manager: Dário Monteiro
- League: Moçambola
- 2021: 9
- Website: https://web.archive.org/web/20110523095248/http://www.ligamuculmana.co.mz/
| Home colours | Away colours |

Liga Desportiva de Maputo is a Mozambican association football club based in Maputo, Mozambique that plays in the country's top football division, Moçambola. One of the richest clubs in Mozambique, it was founded on 8 November 1990 and has won four league titles and one cup.

== History ==
The club was founded on 8 November 1990 in Maputo under the name of Liga Desportiva Muçulmana de Maputo (Muslim Sporting League of Maputo). On 19 July 2014, the club was renamed to Liga Desportiva de Maputo, in order to separate itself from religion and politics; the naming controversy began in 2012 when FIBA refused to allow the club's women's basketball team from entering the African Champions League.

== Achievements ==
- Championship of Mozambique: 2010, 2011, 2013, 2014
- Cup of Mozambique: 2012

== Performance in CAF competitions ==
- CAF Champions League: 3 appearances

2011 – preliminary round
2012 – first round
2014 – first round

- CAF Confederation Cup: 1 appearance

2013 – play-off round

== See also ==
- Islam in Mozambique

== External sources ==
- 2014 CAF Champions League – Liga Desportiva Muçulmana de Maputo – cafonline.com
- 2015 CAF Champions League – Liga Desportiva Muçulmana de Maputo – cafonline.com
- Team profile – soccerway.com
