= CD Costa do Sol =

Mozambican sports club

Costa do Sol
- Full name: Clube de Desportos da Costa do Sol
- Nickname: Canarinhos
- Short name: Costa do Sol
- Founded: 15 of October 1955 (65 years ago) as Sport Lourenço Marques e Benfica
- Ground: Estádio do Costa do Sol
- Capacity: 10,000
- President: Alberto Banze
- Head Coachh: (Portugal) Horácio Gonçalves
- League: Moçambola
- 2025: 8th
- Website: www.costadosol.co.mz
Home colours	Away colours

Clube de Desportos da Costa do Sol, commonly known as Costa do Sol, is a Mozambican sports club based in Maputo. It is best known for the professional football team playing in Moçambola, the top division in Mozambican football.

Founded in 15 of October 1955, Costa do Sol won its first title in 1979, the Mozambican league, and today is the club with the most titles won since national independence. They are nicknamed canarinhos (little canaries) for their equipment colour.

The club is sponsored by Meridianbet.

== Name history ==
- 15 Oct 1955 – 76 : Founded as Sport Lourenço Marques e Benfica
- 1976 – 78 : The club is renamed Sport Maputo e Benfica
- 1978 – : The club is renamed Clube de Desportos da Costa do Sol

== Stadium ==
The club plays their home matches at Estádio do Costa do Sol and has a maximum capacity of 10,000 people. The venue is located about 500 metres (550 yards) from the Costa do Sol beach in Maputo - which inspired the refoundation of the club's name in 1978.

== Honours ==
- Moçambola
  - Winners (10): 1979, 1980, 1991, 1992, 1993, 1994, 1999/2000, 2001, 2007, 2019
- Taça de Moçambique
  - Winners (12): 1980, 1983, 1988, 1992, 1993, 1995, 1997, 1999, 2000, 2002, 2007, 2017
- Supertaça de Moçambique
  - Winners (9): 1994, 1999/2000, 2000/2001, 2002, 2003, 2008, 2018, 2019, 2020

== Performance in African competitions ==
- CAF Champions League: 6 appearances

1999 – first round
2001 – first round
2002 – group stage
2008 – preliminary round
2008 – first round
2019-20 – preliminary round

- African Cup of Champions Clubs: 6 appearances

1980 – first round
1981 – second round
1992 – second round
1993 – second round
1994 – second round
1995 – first round

- CAF Confederation Cup: 2 appearances

2010 – first round
2018 – preliminary round

- CAF Cup Winners' Cup: 6 appearances

1984 – first round
1989 – second round
1996 – quarter-finals
1998 – quarter-finals
2000 – first round
2003 – second round

== Players ==
=== First-team squad ===
As of 25 December 2021

Note: Flags indicate national team as defined under FIFA eligibility rules; some limited exceptions apply. Players may hold more than one non-FIFA nationality.

No.	Pos.	Nation	Player
1	GK	MOZ	Victor Guambe
2	DF	MOZ	Abú
3	DF	MOZ	Chico Mioche
4	DF	MOZ	Danilo
5	MF	MOZ	Nené
6	DF	MOZ	Mambucho
7	MF	MOZ	Nelson Divrassone
8	MF	MOZ	Nilton
9	FW	TOG	Kissimbo
10	FW	MOZ	Isac de Carvalho
11	FW	MOZ	Telinho
12	GK	MOZ	Pinto
14	DF	MOZ	Bernardo

No.	Pos.	Nation	Player
15	DF	MOZ	Jorge
16	MF	NAM	Elmo Kambindu
17	FW	MOZ	Mário Capena
19	MF	LBR	Stephen Seameh
20	FW	KEN	Raymond Murugi
21	FW	MOZ	Chelito Omar
22	DF	MOZ	Manucho
23	MF	MOZ	Carrasco
24	GK	MOZ	Wilson
30	DF	MOZ	Salomão Mondlane
32	MF	MOZ	Nandinho
33	DF	MOZ	Osama Eduardo

== Personnel ==
=== Technical staff ===
Position	Staff
Head coach	(Portugal) Horácio Gonçalves
Assistant coaches	(Mozambique) Jossias Macamo
Assistant coaches	(Mozambique) António Chirindza
Goalkeeper coach	(Mozambique) Antoninho Guambe

Last updated: 25 December 2020
Source: Costa do Sol
