= UD Songo =

- Full name: União Desportiva do Songo
- Founded: 1982
- Ground: Estadio da HCB, Songo, Mozambique
- Capacity: 2,000
- Chairman: Filipe Hlanganani
- Manager: Bernardo Hlatshwayo
- League: Moçambola
- 2025: Champions
Home colours	Away colours	Third colours

União Desportiva do Songo is a Mozambican professional football club based in Songo, Cahora-Bassa, that competes in the Moçambola.

The club was founded by the Hidroeléctrica de Cahora Bassa company as Grupo Desportivo da Hidroeléctrica de Cahora Bassa de Songo, or simply HCB Songo in 1982.

== Stadium ==
Currently the team plays at the 2,000 capacity Estadio da HCB.

== Achievements ==
- Moçambola: 4

2017, 2018, 2022, 2025.

- Taça de Moçambique: 3

2016, 2019, 2025.

- Supertaça de Moçambique: 1

2022.

== Performance in CAF competitions ==
- CAF Confederation Cup: 1 appearance

2017 – Preliminary Round
