= Mozambican Football Federation =

Governing body of association football in Mozambique

CAF
- Founded: 1975
- FIFA affiliation: 1980
- CAF affiliation: 1978
- President: Feizal Sidat
- Website: http://www.fmf.co.mz/

The Mozambican Football Federation (Portuguese: Federação Moçambicana de Futebol, FMF) is the governing body of football in Mozambique. It was founded in 1975, affiliated to FIFA in 1980 and to CAF in 1978. It organizes the national football league Moçambola and the national team.
