= Clube Ferroviário de Maputo =

Mozambican multi sports club

Ferroviário de Maputo
- Full name: Clube Ferroviário de Maputo
- Nickname: Os Locomotivas
- Founded: 1924; 102 years ago
- Ground: Estádio da Machava; Maputo, Mozambique
- Capacity: 45,000
- Chairman: Osório Lucas
- Manager: João Chissano
- League: Moçambola
- 2025: 5th
Home colours	Away colours

Clube Ferroviário de Maputo, or simply Ferroviário, is a Mozambique multi sports club from Maputo especially known for its football operations but also for its basketball and roller hockey team.

== History ==
The club was founded in 1924, as Clube Ferroviário de Lourenço Marques. In 1976, the club was renamed to Clube Ferroviário de Maputo. In 1982, the club won its first two titles, the Cup of Mozambique, and the Mozambican League. After winning the Moçambola in 2008 and in 2009, they finished in the fifth position in the 2011 edition of the league, concluded on November 6, 2011. They won the Taça de Moçambique in the same year, after they defeated Chingale de Tete in the final.

== Stadium ==
The club plays their home matches at Estádio da Machava, which has a maximum capacity of 45,000 people.

== Achievements ==
=== Football ===
- Moçambola

Colonial champions:

Winners (8): 1956, 1961, 1963, 1966, 1967, 1968, 1970, 1972

Since independence:

Winners (10): 1982, 1989, 1996, 1997, 1998–99, 2002, 2005, 2008, 2009, 2015

- Cup of Mozambique

Winners (7): 1984, 1989, 2004, 2009, 2011, 2022, 2024

- Maputo Honour Cup

Winners (2): 2001–02, 2005

=== Roller hockey ===
- Portuguese Roller Hockey First Division

Winners (2): 1962

== Performance in African competitions ==
- CAF Champions League: 6 appearances

1997 - Group Stage
1998 - Second Round

2000 - Second Round
2003 - First Round

2006 - First Round
2009 - Preliminary Round

- African Cup of Champions Clubs: 2 appearances

1983 - Second Round
1990 - First Round

- CAF Confederation Cup: 3 appearances

2005 - First Round
2012 - First Round
2024 - Second Round

- CAF Cup Winners' Cup: 1 appearance

1994 - First Round

- CAF Cup: 7 appearances

1992 - Semi-finals
1993 - First Round
1994 - Second Round

1995 - Quarter-finals
1996 - Second Round
2001 - Quarter-finals

2002 - First Round

== Basketball team ==
The club has a strong basketball team. Several of the club's players have represented different national teams at the FIBA Africa Championships. Octavio Magolico, for example, has played for the Mozambique national basketball team and Cedrick Kalombo has played for the South Africa national basketball team.
