= 2025 Africa Cup of Nations Group F =

Football tournament group stage

Group F of the 2025 Africa Cup of Nations took place from 24 to 31 December 2025. The group consisted of defending champions Ivory Coast, Cameroon, Gabon, and Mozambique.

Ivory Coast and Cameroon as the top two teams, along with Mozambique as one of the four best third-placed teams, advanced to the round of 16.

== Teams ==
Draw position	Team	Zone	Method of qualification	Date of qualification	Finals appearance	Last appearance	Previous best performance	FIFA Rankings	
Draw position	Team	Zone	Method of qualification	Date of qualification	Finals appearance	Last appearance	Previous best performance	December 2024 (Note: The rankings of December 2024 were used for seeding for the final draw.)	December 2025
F1	Ivory Coast	WAFU	Group G runners-up	13 November 2024	26th	2023	Winners (1992, 2015, 2023)	46	TBA
F2	Cameroon	UNIFFAC	Group J winners	14 October 2024	14th	2023	Winners (1984, 1988, 2000, 2002, 2017)	49	TBA
F3	Gabon	UNIFFAC	Group B runners-up	14 November 2024	9th	2021	Quarter-finals (1996, 2012)	84	TBA
F4	Mozambique	COSAFA	Group I runners-up	19 November 2024	6th	2023	Group stage (1986, 1996, 1998, 2010, 2023)	96	TBA

== Standings ==
Pos	Team	Pld	W	D	L	GF	GA	GD	Pts	Qualification
1	Ivory Coast	3	2	1	0	5	3	+2	7	Advance to knockout stage
2	Cameroon	3	2	1	0	4	2	+2	7	Advance to knockout stage
3	Mozambique	3	1	0	2	4	5	−1	3	Advance to knockout stage
4	Gabon	3	0	0	3	4	7	−3	0	

Source: CAF
Rules for classification: Group stage tiebreakers

== Matches ==
All times are local, CET (UTC+1).

=== Ivory Coast vs Mozambique ===
24 December 2025
18:30

Ivory Coast	1–0	Mozambique
Diallo 49'	Report

Marrakesh Stadium, Marrakesh
Attendance: 13,041
Referee: Samuel Uwikunda (Rwanda)

Ivory Coast	Mozambique

GK	1	Yahia Fofana
RB	17	Guéla Doué
CB	7	Odilon Kossounou
CB	21	Evan Ndicka
LB	3	Ghislain Konan
DM	4	Jean Michaël Seri		(substituted off) 68'
CM	8	Franck Kessié (c)
CM	18	Ibrahim Sangaré
RF	15	Amad Diallo		(substituted off) 81'
CF	10	Wilfried Zaha		(substituted off) 67'
LF	26	Yan Diomande	(yellow card) 80'
Substitutes:
FW	9	Vakoun Issouf Bayo		(substituted on) 67'
MF	6	Seko Fofana		(substituted on) 68'
FW	14	Oumar Diakité		(substituted on) 81'
Manager:
Emerse Faé

GK	1	Ernan Siluane
RB	23	Diogo Calila		(substituted off) 84'
CB	17	Edson Mexer (c)
CB	15	Reinildo Mandava	(yellow card) 55'
LB	5	Bruno Langa
DM	6	Manuel Kambala		(substituted off) 67'
RM	10	Geny Catamo
CM	16	Alfons Amade
CM	21	Guima
LM	19	Witi	(yellow card) 35'	(substituted off) 67'
CF	13	Stanley Ratifo		(substituted off) 67'
Substitutes:
MF	7	Domingues		(substituted on) 67'
MF	18	Gildo Vilanculos		(substituted on) 67'
FW	9	Faisal Bangal		(substituted on) 67'
DF	2	Nanani		(substituted on) 84'
Manager:
Chiquinho Conde

=== Cameroon vs Gabon ===
24 December 2025
21:00

Cameroon	1–0	Gabon
Etta Eyong 6'	Report

Adrar Stadium, Agadir
Attendance: 35,200
Referee: Amin Mohamed Omar (Egypt)

Cameroon	Gabon

GK	16	Devis Epassy
CB	3	Che Malone
CB	17	Samuel Kotto
CB	5	Nouhou Tolo
RM	2	Junior Tchamadeu	(yellow card) 87'
CM	15	Arthur Avom		(substituted off) 89'
CM	24	Carlos Baleba		(substituted off) 46'
CM	14	Danny Namaso		(substituted off) 66'
LM	13	Darlin Yongwa
AM	10	Bryan Mbeumo (c)	(yellow card) 79'
CF	21	Karl Etta Eyong		(substituted off) 67'
Substitutes:
DF	6	Gerzino Nyamsi		(substituted on) 89'
MF	8	Jean Onana		(substituted on) 46'
FW	9	Frank Magri		(substituted on) 67'
MF	25	Junior Dina Ebimbe		(substituted on) 66'
Manager:
David Pagou

GK	23	Loyce Mbaba
RB	3	Anthony Oyono
CB	5	Bruno Ecuele Manga (c)
CB	4	Alex Moucketou-Moussounda		(substituted off) 85'
LB	19	Jacques Ekomié
RM	28	Royce Openda		(substituted off) 72'
CM	22	Didier Ndong	(yellow card) 22'
CM	17	André Biyogo Poko		(substituted off) 72'
LM	27	Teddy Averlant		(substituted off) 33'
CF	14	Eric Bocoum		(substituted off) 33'
CF	20	Denis Bouanga
Substitutes:
MF	8	Clench Loufilou		(substituted on) 72'
FW	9	Pierre-Emerick Aubameyang		(substituted on) 33'
MF	10	Shavy Babicka		(substituted on) 85'
FW	11	Jim Allevinah		(substituted on) 72'
MF	18	Mario Lemina		(substituted on) 33'
Manager:
Thierry Mouyouma

=== Ivory Coast vs Cameroon ===
28 December 2025
21:00

Ivory Coast	1–1	Cameroon
Diallo 51'	Report	Konan 56' (o.g.)

Marrakesh Stadium, Marrakesh
Attendance: 35,165
Referee: Mustapha Ghorbal (Algeria)

Ivory Coast	Cameroon

GK	1	Yahia Fofana
RB	17	Guéla Doué
CB	7	Odilon Kossounou
CB	21	Evan Ndicka
LB	3	Ghislain Konan
DM	18	Ibrahim Sangaré		(substituted off) 61'
CM	8	Franck Kessié (c)
CM	6	Seko Fofana		(substituted off) 70'
RF	15	Amad Diallo	(yellow card) 38'	(substituted off) 87'
CF	9	Vakoun Issouf Bayo		(substituted off) 70'
LF	26	Yan Diomande
Substitutes:
MF	25	Jean-Philippe Gbamin		(substituted on) 61'
MF	19	Christ Inao Oulaï	(yellow card) 80'	(substituted on) 70'
FW	22	Evann Guessand		(substituted on) 70'
FW	10	Wilfried Zaha		(substituted on) 87'
Manager:
Emerse Faé

GK	16	Devis Epassy
CB	3	Che Malone
CB	17	Samuel Kotto
CB	5	Nouhou Tolo (c)
RM	2	Junior Tchamadeu	(yellow card) 75'	(substituted off) 80'
CM	15	Arthur Avom		(substituted off) 90+1'
CM	24	Carlos Baleba
LM	13	Darlin Yongwa
AM	10	Bryan Mbeumo
AM	14	Danny Namaso		(substituted off) 74'
CF	26	Christian Kofane		(substituted off) 73'
Substitutes:
FW	21	Karl Etta Eyong		(substituted on) 73'
MF	20	Olivier Kemen		(substituted on) 74'
FW	11	Christian Bassogog		(substituted on) 80'
DF	22	Flavien Enzo Boyomo		(substituted on) 90+1'
Manager:
David Pagou

=== Gabon vs Mozambique ===
28 December 2025
13:30

Gabon	2–3	Mozambique
Aubameyang 45+5'; Moucketou-Moussounda 76'	Report	Bangal 37'; Catamo 42' (pen.); Calila 52'

Adrar Stadium, Agadir
Attendance: 9,796
Referee: Mehrez Melki (Tunisia)

Gabon	Mozambique

GK	23	Loyce Mbaba
RB	3	Anthony Oyono		(substituted off) 46'
CB	5	Bruno Ecuele Manga (c)	(yellow card) 39'	(substituted off) 46'
CB	18	Mario Lemina
LB	19	Jacques Ekomié
CM	12	Guélor Kanga
CM	22	Didier Ndong
RW	10	Shavy Babicka		(substituted off) 46'
AM	17	André Biyogo Poko	(yellow card) 44'
LW	20	Denis Bouanga		(substituted on) 76'
CF	9	Pierre-Emerick Aubameyang
Substitutes:
MF	28	Royce Openda		(substituted on) 46'
DF	4	Alex Moucketou-Moussounda		(substituted on) 46'
DF	13	Mick Omfia		(substituted on) 46'
FW	24	Randy Essang-Matouti		(substituted on) 76'
Manager:
Thierry Mouyouma

GK	1	Ernan Siluane	(yellow card) 87'
RB	23	Diogo Calila		(substituted off) 84'
CB	17	Edson Mexer (c)
CB	15	Reinildo Mandava
LB	5	Bruno Langa
CM	21	Guima
CM	16	Alfons Amade	(yellow card) 34'
RW	10	Geny Catamo
AM	7	Domingues		(substituted off) 64'
LW	19	Witi		(substituted off) 64'
CF	9	Faisal Bangal		(substituted off) 79'
Substitutes:
MF	18	Gildo Vilanculos		(substituted on) 64'
MF	6	Manuel Kambala		(substituted on) 64'
DF	4	Fernando Chamboco		(substituted on) 79'
DF	2	Nanani		(substituted on) 84'
Manager:
Chiquinho Conde

=== Gabon vs Ivory Coast ===
31 December 2025
20:00

Gabon	2–3	Ivory Coast
Kanga 11'; Bouanga 21'	Report	Krasso 44'; Guessand 84'; Touré 90+1'

Marrakesh Stadium, Marrakesh
Attendance: 20,833
Referee: Omar Artan (Somalia)

Gabon	Ivory Coast

GK	16	François Bekale
RB	21	Jérémy Oyono		(substituted off) 78'
CB	4	Alex Moucketou-Moussounda
CB	13	Mick Omfia		(substituted off) 78'
LB	19	Jacques Ekomié
CM	22	Didier Ndong	(yellow card) 16'	(substituted off) 46'
CM	18	Mario Lemina (c)
RW	17	André Biyogo Poko
AM	12	Guélor Kanga
LW	27	Teddy Averlant		(substituted off) 84'
CF	20	Denis Bouanga	(yellow card) 45+2'	(substituted off) 90+3'
Substitutes:
MF	8	Clench Loufilou		(substituted on) 46'
FW	7	Royce Openda		(substituted on) 78'
DF	26	Jonathan Do Marcolino		(substituted on) 78'
MF	15	Samaké Nzé Bagnama		(substituted on) 84'
FW	28	Malick Evouna		(substituted on) 90+3'
Manager:
Thierry Mouyouma

GK	23	Alban Lafont
RB	5	Armel Zohouri		(substituted off) 76'
CB	2	Ousmane Diomande
CB	20	Emmanuel Agbadou
LB	13	Christopher Opéri
DM	4	Jean Michaël Seri
CM	8	Franck Kessié (c)		(substituted off) 68'
CM	19	Christ Inao Oulaï
RF	14	Oumar Diakité	(yellow card) 54'	(substituted off) 76'
CF	11	Jean-Philippe Krasso		(substituted off) 82'
LF	10	Wilfried Zaha		(substituted off) 68'
Substitutes:
FW	24	Bazoumana Touré		(substituted on) 68'
FW	22	Evann Guessand		(substituted on) 68'
DF	17	Guéla Doué		(substituted on) 76'
FW	15	Amad Diallo		(substituted on) 76'
FW	26	Yan Diomande		(substituted on) 82'
Manager:
Emerse Faé

=== Mozambique vs Cameroon ===
31 December 2025
20:00

Mozambique	1–2	Cameroon
Catamo 23'	Report	Nené 28' (o.g.); Kofane 55'

Adrar Stadium, Agadir
Attendance: 13,093
Referee: Jalal Jayed (Morocco)

Mozambique	Cameroon

GK	22	Ivane Urrubal
RB	23	Diogo Calila	(substituted off) 15'
CB	4	Fernando Chamboco
CB	8	Edmilson Dove
LB	2	Nanani
CM	6	Manuel Kambala
CM	3	Nené	(substituted off) 52'
RW	10	Geny Catamo	(substituted off) 60'
AM	7	Domingues (c)	(substituted off) 52'
LW	18	Gildo Vilanculos
CF	13	Stanley Ratifo	(substituted off) 60'
Substitutes:
DF	5	Bruno Langa	(substituted on) 15'
MF	20	Keyns Abdala	(substituted on) 52'
MF	11	João Bonde	(substituted on) 52'
FW	24	Melque Alexandre	(substituted on) 60'
FW	25	Chamito	(substituted on) 60'
Manager:
Chiquinho Conde

GK	16	Devis Epassy
RB	22	Flavien Enzo Boyomo
CB	6	Gerzino Nyamsi	(yellow card) 72'
CB	5	Nouhou Tolo (c)		(substituted off) 42'
LB	18	Aboubakar Nagida
CM	24	Carlos Baleba
CM	20	Olivier Kemen
RW	10	Bryan Mbeumo		(substituted off) 46'
AM	14	Danny Namaso		(substituted off) 62'
LW	9	Frank Magri		(substituted off) 72'
CF	26	Christian Kofane
Substitutes:
DF	4	Christopher Wooh	(yellow card) 58'	(substituted on) 42'
FW	11	Christian Bassogog		(substituted on) 46'
MF	27	Arnold Maël Kamdem		(substituted on) 46'
MF	25	Éric Junior Dina Ebimbe		(substituted on) 62'
FW	21	Karl Etta Eyong	(yellow card) 81'	(substituted on) 72'
Manager:
David Pagou
