= 2025 Africa Cup of Nations knockout stage =

Football tournament results

The knockout stage of the 2025 Africa Cup of Nations was the second and final stage of the competition, following the group stage. It began on 3 January with the round of 16 and ended on 18 January 2026 with the final held at the Prince Moulay Abdellah Stadium in Rabat.

A total of 16 teams (the top two teams from each group, along with the four best third-placed teams) advanced to the knockout stage to compete in a single-elimination style tournament.

All match times are local, CET (UTC+1).

== Format ==
In the knockout stage, except for the third place play-off, if a match was level at the end of 90 minutes of normal playing time, extra time was played (two periods of 15 minutes each). If still tied after extra time, a penalty shoot-out was used to determine the winner. In the third place play-off, if the scores remained level after 90 minutes the match went directly to a penalty shoot-out, without any extra time being played.

== Qualified teams ==
The top two placed teams from each of the six groups, plus the four best-placed third teams, qualified for the knockout stage.

Group	Winners	Runners-up	Third-placed teams (Best four qualified)
A	Morocco	Mali	—N/a
B	Egypt	South Africa	—N/a
C	Nigeria	Tunisia	Tanzania
D	Senegal	DR Congo	Benin
E	Algeria	Burkina Faso	Sudan
F	Ivory Coast	Cameroon	Mozambique

== Bracket ==
Round of 16
3 January – Casablanca
Mali (p)	1 (3)
Tunisia	1 (2)
3 January – Tangier
Senegal	3
Sudan	1
5 January – Agadir
Egypt (a.e.t.)	3
Benin	1
6 January – Marrakesh
Ivory Coast	3
Burkina Faso	0
6 January – Rabat (Moulay El Hassan)
Algeria (a.e.t.)	1
DR Congo	0
5 January – Fez
Nigeria	4
Mozambique	0
4 January – Rabat (Al Medina)
South Africa	1
Cameroon	2
4 January – Rabat (Moulay Abdellah)
Morocco	1
Tanzania	0

Quarter-finals
9 January – Tangier
Mali	0
Senegal	1
10 January – Agadir
Egypt	3
Ivory Coast	2
10 January – Marrakesh
Algeria	0
Nigeria	2
9 January – Rabat (Moulay Abdellah)
Cameroon	0
Morocco	2

Semi-finals
14 January – Tangier
Senegal	1
Egypt	0
14 January – Rabat (Moulay Abdellah)
Nigeria	0 (2)
Morocco (p)	0 (4)

Final
18 January – Rabat (Moulay Abdellah)
Senegal	0
Morocco (awd.) (Note: The final match originally finished 1–0 for Senegal after extra time. On 17 March 2026, the CAF Appeal Board ruled that, per articles 82 and 84 of the competition regulations, when Senegal left the field and repeatedly refused to return from their dressing room, they had forfeited the game; the rules for forfeited games deem that the match, and the Championship, be awarded as a 3–0 win for Morocco.)	3
Third place play-off
17 January – Casablanca
Egypt	0 (2)
Nigeria (p)	0 (4)

== Round of 16 ==
=== Senegal vs Sudan ===
3 January 2026
17:00

Senegal	3–1	Sudan
P. Gueye 29', 45+3'; Mbaye 77'	Report	Abdallah 6'

Tangier Grand Stadium, Tangier
Attendance: 30,045
Referee: Dahane Beida (Mauritania)

Senegal	Sudan

GK	16	Édouard Mendy
RB	15	Krépin Diatta
CB	4	Abdoulaye Seck
CB	19	Moussa Niakhaté
LB	14	Ismail Jakobs	(yellow card) 13'	(substituted off) 53'
DM	5	Idrissa Gueye (c)
CM	7	Habib Diarra		(substituted off) 73'
CM	26	Pape Gueye		(substituted off) 87'
RF	18	Ismaïla Sarr		(substituted off) 74'
CF	11	Nicolas Jackson	(yellow card) 50'	(substituted off) 53'
LF	10	Sadio Mané
Substitutes:
FW	9	Boulaye Dia		(substituted on) 53'
DF	25	El Hadji Malick Diouf		(substituted on) 53'
MF	8	Lamine Camara		(substituted on) 73'
FW	27	Ibrahim Mbaye		(substituted on) 74'
MF	6	Pathé Ciss		(substituted on) 87'
Manager:
Pape Thiaw

GK	21	Monged Abuzaid
RB	25	Sheddy Barglan	(yellow card) 70'
CB	3	Ahmed Saeed
CB	6	Mustafa Karshoum		(substituted off) 61'
LB	12	Bakhit Khamis (c)
CM	2	Abuaagla Abdalla		(substituted off) 79'
CM	13	Ammar Taifour
RW	26	Aamir Abdallah		(substituted off) 79'
AM	5	Walieldin Khedr		(substituted off) 79'
LW	10	Mohamed Abdelrahman		(substituted off) 68'
CF	14	Mohamed Eisa
Substitutes:
DF	4	Altayeb Abdelrazeg		(substituted on) 61'
FW	15	Salah Adel	(yellow card) 85'	(substituted on) 68'
FW	11	John Mano		(substituted on) 79'
FW	22	Al-Jezoli Nouh		(substituted on) 79'
FW	8	Yaser Muzmel		(substituted on) 79'
Manager:
(Ghana) James Kwesi Appiah

=== Mali vs Tunisia ===
3 January 2026
20:00

Mali	1–1 (a.e.t.)	Tunisia
Sinayoko 90+6' (pen.)	Report	Chaouat 88'
Penalties
Bissouma (penalty missed); Sinayoko (penalty scored); Dorgeles (penalty missed); Diakité (penalty scored); Touré (penalty scored)	3–2	(penalty scored) Meriah; (penalty missed) Abdi; (penalty scored) Saad; (penalty missed) Achouri; (penalty missed) Ben Romdhane

Mohammed V Stadium, Casablanca
Attendance: 41,982
Referee: Abongile Tom (South Africa)

Mali	Tunisia

GK	16	Djigui Diarra
RB	26	Woyo Coulibaly	(red card) 26'
CB	5	Abdoulaye Diaby
CB	25	Ousmane Camara
LB	3	Amadou Dante		(substituted off) 90+2'
CM	11	Lassana Coulibaly		(substituted off) 117'
CM	23	Aliou Dieng		(substituted off) 110'
RW	20	Mamadou Sangaré		(substituted off) 90+2'
AM	10	Yves Bissouma (c)
LW	8	Mamadou Doumbia	(yellow card) 4'	(substituted off) 57'
CF	17	Lassine Sinayoko
Substitutes:
RW	7	Dorgeles Nene	(yellow card) 104'	(substituted on) 57'
FW	9	El Bilal Touré		(substituted on) 90+2'
FW	27	Gaoussou Diakité		(substituted on) 90+2'
MF	24	Ibrahima Sissoko	(yellow card) 118'	(substituted on) 110'
DF	2	Hamari Traoré		(substituted on) 117'
Manager:
(Belgium) Tom Saintfiet

GK	16	Aymen Dahmen
RB	20	Yan Valery		(substituted off) 111'
CB	6	Dylan Bronn	(yellow card) 7'	(substituted off) 11'
CB	3	Montassar Talbi
LB	2	Ali Abdi
CM	17	Ellyes Skhiri
CM	13	Ferjani Sassi (c)
RW	11	Ismaël Gharbi		(substituted off) 70'
AM	15	Mohamed Belhadj Mahmoud	(yellow card) 23'	(substituted off) 46'
LW	10	Hannibal Mejbri	(yellow card) 60'	(substituted off) 85'
CF	9	Hazem Mastouri		(substituted off) 70'
Substitutes:
DF	4	Yassine Meriah	(yellow card) 109'	(substituted on) 11'
FW	7	Elias Achouri		(substituted on) 46'
FW	8	Elias Saad		(substituted on) 70'
FW	19	Firas Chaouat	(yellow card) 85'	(substituted on) 70'
MF	5	Mohamed Ali Ben Romdhane	(yellow card) 90+2'	(substituted on) 85'
DF	14	Mohamed Ben Ali		(substituted on) 111'
Manager:
Sami Trabelsi

=== Morocco vs Tanzania ===
4 January 2026
17:00

Morocco	1–0	Tanzania
Brahim 64'	Report

Prince Moulay Abdellah Stadium, Rabat
Attendance: 63,894
Referee: Boubou Traore (Mali)

Morocco	Tanzania

GK	1	Yassine Bounou
RB	2	Achraf Hakimi (c)
CB	5	Nayef Aguerd
CB	25	Adam Masina
LB	3	Noussair Mazraoui		(substituted off) 76'
DM	24	Neil El Aynaoui
CM	23	Bilal El Khannouss
CM	11	Ismael Saibari	(yellow card) 69'	(substituted off) 77'
RF	10	Brahim Díaz		(substituted off) 86'
CF	20	Ayoub El Kaabi		(substituted off) 77'
LF	17	Abde Ezzalzouli
Substitutes:
DF	26	Anass Salah-Eddine		(substituted on) 76'
MF	13	Eliesse Ben Seghir		(substituted on) 77'
FW	19	Youssef En-Nesyri		(substituted on) 77'
MF	14	Oussama Targhalline		(substituted on) 86'
Manager:
Walid Regragui

GK	1	Hussein Masalanga
CB	5	Dickson Job	(yellow card) 90'
CB	14	Bakari Mwamnyeto (c)
CB	4	Ibrahim Hamad	(yellow card) 13'
RM	25	Haji Mnoga		(substituted off) 72'
CM	27	Alphonce Msanga	(yellow card) 78'	(substituted off) 83'
CM	20	Novatus Miroshi
LM	15	Mohamed Husseini		(substituted off) 73'
AM	6	Feisal Salum	(yellow card) 45+3'
CF	9	Selemani Mwalimu		(substituted off) 66'
CF	12	Simon Msuva		(substituted off) 73'
Substitutes:
FW	10	Mbwana Samatta	(yellow card) 67'	(substituted on) 66'
DF	22	Shomari Kapombe		(substituted on) 72'
MF	26	Tarryn Allarakhia		(substituted on) 73'
MF	8	Charles M'Mombwa		(substituted on) 73'
FW	7	Iddy Nado		(substituted on) 83'
Manager:
(Argentina) Miguel Gamondi

=== South Africa vs Cameroon ===
4 January 2026
20:00

South Africa	1–2	Cameroon
Makgopa 88'	Report	Tchamadeu 34'; Kofane 47'

Al Medina Stadium, Rabat
Attendance: 14,127
Referee: Peter Waweru (Kenya)

South Africa	Cameroon

GK	1	Ronwen Williams (c)
CB	21	Siyabonga Ngezana	(yellow card) 32'
CB	19	Nkosinathi Sibisi	(yellow card) 59'	(substituted off) 83'
CB	14	Mbekezeli Mbokazi
RM	20	Khuliso Mudau
CM	4	Teboho Mokoena	(yellow card) 72'
CM	15	Bathusi Aubaas
LM	18	Samukele Kabini		(substituted off) 63'
AM	7	Oswin Appollis		(substituted off) 63'
AM	10	Relebohile Mofokeng		(substituted off) 75'
CF	9	Lyle Foster	(yellow card) 83'
Substitutes:
MF	6	Aubrey Modiba	(yellow card) 65'	(substituted on) 63'
FW	23	Evidence Makgopa		(substituted on) 63'
MF	17	Sipho Mbule		(substituted on) 75'
FW	8	Tshepang Moremi		(substituted on) 83'
Manager:
(Belgium) Hugo Broos

GK	16	Devis Epassy
CB	3	Che Malone
CB	17	Samuel Kotto
CB	5	Nouhou Tolo (c)	(yellow card) 2'
RM	2	Junior Tchamadeu
CM	15	Arthur Avom
CM	24	Carlos Baleba	(yellow card) 87'	(substituted off) 90'
CM	14	Danny Namaso		(substituted off) 79'
LM	13	Darlin Yongwa		(substituted off) 21'
CF	10	Bryan Mbeumo
CF	26	Christian Kofane		(substituted off) 90'
Substitutes:
DF	18	Aboubakar Nagida		(substituted on) 21'	(substituted off) 79'
DF	4	Christopher Wooh		(substituted on) 79'
MF	20	Olivier Kemen		(substituted on) 79'
FW	12	Patrick Soko		(substituted on) 90'
DF	22	Flavien Enzo Boyomo		(substituted on) 90'
Manager:
David Pagou

=== Egypt vs Benin ===
5 January 2026
17:00

Egypt	3–1 (a.e.t.)	Benin
Attia 69'; Ibrahim 97'; Salah 120+4'	Report	Dossou 83'

Adrar Stadium, Agadir
Attendance: 20,191
Referee: Pierre Atcho (Gabon)

Egypt	Benin

GK	23	Mohamed El Shenawy
CB	6	Yasser Ibrahim
CB	14	Hamdy Fathy
CB	5	Ramy Rabia	(yellow card) 13'
RM	3	Mohamed Hany
CM	7	Trézéguet		(substituted off) 59'
CM	19	Marwan Attia	(yellow card) 29'
CM	20	Ibrahim Adel		(substituted off) 59'
LM	12	Mohamed Hamdy	(yellow card) 79'	(substituted off) 45+1'
CF	10	Mohamed Salah (c)
CF	22	Omar Marmoush		(substituted off) 119'
Substitutes:
DF	13	Ahmed Fatouh	(yellow card) 106'	(substituted on) 45+1'
MF	8	Emam Ashour		(substituted on) 59'
MF	25	Zizo		(substituted on) 59'
FW	11	Mostafa Mohamed		(substituted on) 119'
Manager:
Hossam Hassan

GK	1	Marcel Dandjinou
RB	3	Tamimou Ouorou
CB	6	Olivier Verdon (c)
CB	13	Mohamed Tijani	(yellow card) 101'
LB	5	Yohan Roche		(substituted off) 105'
RM	17	Rodolfo Aloko		(substituted off) 90+2'
CM	15	Sessi D'Almeida		(substituted off) 77'
CM	8	Hassane Imourane		(substituted off) 105'
LM	18	Junior Olaitan	(yellow card) 27'
AM	19	Dodo Dokou		(substituted off) 77'
CF	10	Aiyegun Tosin		(substituted off) 32'
Substitutes:
MF	20	Jodel Dossou		(substituted on) 32'
MF	25	Olatoundji Tessilimi		(substituted on) 77'
MF	4	Attidjikou Samadou	(yellow card) 108'	(substituted on) 77'
MF	22	Romaric Amoussou		(substituted on) 90+2'
MF	7	Mattéo Ahlinvi	(yellow card) 118'	(substituted on) 105'
MF	27	Gislain Ahoudo		(substituted on) 105'
Manager:
(Germany) Gernot Rohr

=== Nigeria vs Mozambique ===
5 January 2026
20:00

Nigeria	4–0	Mozambique
Lookman 20'; Osimhen 25', 47'; Adams 75'	Report

Fez Stadium, Fez
Attendance: 14,593
Referee: Abdou Mefire (Cameroon)

Nigeria	Mozambique

GK	23	Stanley Nwabali
RB	2	Bright Osayi-Samuel
CB	6	Semi Ajayi
CB	21	Calvin Bassey	(yellow card) 90+3'
LB	13	Bruno Onyemaechi
CM	8	Frank Onyeka	(yellow card) 45+3'	(substituted off) 83'
CM	4	Wilfred Ndidi (c)	(yellow card) 38'	(substituted off) 83'
CM	17	Alex Iwobi
AM	7	Ademola Lookman		(substituted off) 86'
CF	9	Victor Osimhen		(substituted off) 68'
CF	22	Akor Adams		(substituted off) 86'
Substitutes:
FW	15	Moses Simon		(substituted on) 68'
MF	18	Raphael Onyedika		(substituted on) 83'
MF	10	Fisayo Dele-Bashiru		(substituted on) 83'
FW	11	Samuel Chukwueze		(substituted on) 86'
FW	19	Paul Onuachu		(substituted on) 86'
Manager:
(Mali) Éric Chelle

GK	1	Ernan Siluane		(substituted off) 82'
RB	23	Diogo Calila		(substituted off) 46'
CB	17	Mexer
CB	15	Reinildo Mandava
LB	5	Bruno Langa
CM	16	Alfons Amade
CM	21	Guima
RW	10	Geny Catamo
AM	7	Domingues (c)		(substituted off) 46'
LW	19	Witi		(substituted off) 61'
CF	9	Faisal Bangal	(yellow card) 62'	(substituted off) 67'
Substitutes:
DF	2	Nanani		(substituted on) 46'
MF	6	Manuel Kambala		(substituted on) 46'
FW	25	Chamito		(substituted on) 61'
FW	13	Stanley Ratifo		(substituted on) 67'
GK	22	Ivane Urrubal		(substituted on) 82'
Manager:
Chiquinho Conde

=== Algeria vs DR Congo ===
6 January 2026
17:00

Algeria	1–0 (a.e.t.)	DR Congo
Boulbina 119'	Report

Moulay Hassan Stadium, Rabat
Attendance: 18,837
Referee: Mohamed Maarouf (Egypt)

Algeria	DR Congo

GK	23	Luca Zidane
RB	25	Rafik Belghali	(yellow card) 94'
CB	2	Aïssa Mandi
CB	21	Ramy Bensebaini
LB	15	Rayan Aït-Nouri		(substituted off) 70'
RM	7	Riyad Mahrez (c)		(substituted off) 70'
CM	14	Hicham Boudaoui		(substituted off) 114'
CM	10	Ismaël Bennacer		(substituted off) 49'
LM	17	Farès Chaïbi		(substituted off) 113'
CF	22	Ibrahim Maza		(substituted off) 83'
CF	18	Mohamed Amoura
Substitutes:
MF	8	Himad Abdelli		(substituted on) 49'
DF	5	Zineddine Belaïd		(substituted on) 70'
FW	11	Anis Hadj Moussa	(yellow card) 99'	(substituted on) 70'
FW	9	Baghdad Bounedjah	(yellow card) 120+2'	(substituted on) 83'
FW	27	Adil Boulbina		(substituted on) 113'
MF	6	Ramiz Zerrouki		(substituted on) 114'
Manager:
(Bosnia and Herzegovina) Vladimir Petković

GK	1	Lionel Mpasi
RB	2	Aaron Wan-Bissaka
CB	22	Chancel Mbemba (c)	(yellow card) 101'
CB	4	Axel Tuanzebe
LB	12	Joris Kayembe
DM	8	Samuel Moutoussamy		(substituted off) 110'
RM	10	Théo Bongonda		(substituted off) 87'
CM	6	Ngal'ayel Mukau		(substituted off) 69'
CM	14	Noah Sadiki		(substituted off) 70'
LM	13	Meschak Elia		(substituted off) 62'
CF	17	Cédric Bakambu		(substituted off) 87'
Substitutes:
FW	7	Nathanaël Mbuku		(substituted on) 62'
FW	11	Gaël Kakuta		(substituted on) 69'
MF	25	Edo Kayembe	(yellow card) 105'	(substituted on) 70'
FW	19	Fiston Mayele		(substituted on) 87'
FW	27	Michel-Ange Balikwisha		(substituted on) 87'
MF	18	Charles Pickel		(substituted on) 110'
Manager:
(France) Sébastien Desabre

=== Ivory Coast vs Burkina Faso ===
6 January 2026
20:00

Ivory Coast	3–0	Burkina Faso
Diallo 20'; Y. Diomande 32'; Touré 87'	Report

Marrakesh Stadium, Marrakesh
Attendance: 24,019
Referee: Mahmood Ismail (Sudan)

Ivory Coast	Burkina Faso

GK	1	Yahia Fofana
RB	17	Guéla Doué
CB	7	Odilon Kossounou		(substituted off) 90+3'
CB	21	Evan Ndicka
LB	3	Ghislain Konan
DM	18	Ibrahim Sangaré	(yellow card) 66'
CM	8	Franck Kessié (c)
CM	19	Christ Inao Oulaï	(yellow card) 63'	(substituted off) 81'
RF	15	Amad Diallo		(substituted off) 81'
CF	22	Evann Guessand		(substituted off) 75'
LF	26	Yan Diomande		(substituted off) 75'
Substitutes:
FW	11	Jean-Philippe Krasso		(substituted on) 75'
FW	24	Bazoumana Touré		(substituted on) 75'
FW	14	Oumar Diakité		(substituted on) 81'
MF	6	Seko Fofana		(substituted on) 81'
DF	2	Ousmane Diomande		(substituted on) 90+3'
Manager:
Emerse Faé

GK	16	Hervé Koffi
CB	14	Issoufou Dayo (c)
CB	12	Edmond Tapsoba
CB	4	Adamo Nagalo	(yellow card) 5'	(substituted off) 42'
RWB	25	Steeve Yago		(substituted off) 71'
LWB	26	Arsène Kouassi
RM	7	Dango Ouattara
CM	24	Saïdou Simporé
CM	18	Ismahila Ouédraogo		(substituted off) 79'
LM	21	Cyriaque Irié		(substituted off) 71'
CF	2	Lassina Traoré		(substituted off) 46'
Substitutes:
MF	22	Blati Touré		(substituted on) 42'
MF	19	Georgi Minoungou		(substituted on) 46'
DF	9	Issa Kaboré		(substituted on) 71'
FW	10	Bertrand Traoré		(substituted on) 71'
FW	11	Ousseni Bouda		(substituted on) 79'
Manager:
Brama Traoré

== Quarter-finals ==
=== Mali vs Senegal ===
9 January 2026
17:00

Mali	0–1	Senegal
	Report	I. Ndiaye 27'

Tangier Grand Stadium, Tangier
Attendance: 32,385
Referee: Abongile Tom (South Africa)

Mali	Senegal

GK	16	Djigui Diarra
RB	2	Hamari Traoré	(yellow card) 90'
CB	5	Abdoulaye Diaby
CB	25	Ousmane Camara
LB	28	Nathan Gassama
CM	10	Yves Bissouma (c)	(yellow card) 23' (yellow-red card) 45+3'
CM	23	Aliou Dieng		(substituted off) 69'
RW	11	Lassana Coulibaly		(substituted off) 82'
AM	20	Mamadou Sangaré		(substituted off) 82'
LW	4	Amadou Haidara		(substituted off) 55'
CF	17	Lassine Sinayoko		(substituted off) 82'
Substitutes:
FW	7	Dorgeles Nene		(substituted on) 55'
FW	27	Gaoussou Diakité		(substituted on) 69'
MF	8	Mahamadou Doumbia		(substituted on) 82'
MF	19	Kamory Doumbia		(substituted on) 82'
FW	9	El Bilal Touré		(substituted on) 82'
Manager:
(Belgium) Tom Saintfiet

GK	16	Édouard Mendy
RB	15	Krépin Diatta
CB	3	Kalidou Koulibaly (c)	(yellow card) 90+3'
CB	19	Moussa Niakhaté
LB	25	El Hadji Malick Diouf
DM	5	Idrissa Gueye
CM	7	Habib Diarra	(yellow card) 56'	(substituted off) 62'
CM	26	Pape Gueye	(yellow card) 29'	(substituted off) 62'
RF	13	Iliman Ndiaye		(substituted off) 75'
CF	20	Habib Diallo	(yellow card) 61'	(substituted off) 75'
LF	10	Sadio Mané
Substitutes:
MF	6	Pathé Ciss		(substituted on) 62'
MF	8	Lamine Camara		(substituted on) 62'
FW	12	Cherif Ndiaye		(substituted on) 75'
FW	27	Ibrahim Mbaye	(yellow card) 83'	(substituted on) 75'
Manager:
Pape Thiaw

=== Cameroon vs Morocco ===
9 January 2026
20:00

Cameroon	0–2	Morocco
	Report	Brahim 26'; Saibari 74'

Prince Moulay Abdellah Stadium, Rabat
Attendance: 64,178
Referee: Dahane Beida (Mauritania)

Cameroon	Morocco

GK	16	Devis Epassy
CB	3	Che Malone
CB	17	Samuel Kotto
CB	5	Nouhou Tolo (c)	(yellow card) 39'
RM	2	Junior Tchamadeu		(substituted off) 24'
CM	15	Arthur Avom	(yellow card) 9'
CM	24	Carlos Baleba		(substituted off) 77'
LM	18	Aboubakar Nagida
AM	10	Bryan Mbeumo
AM	14	Danny Namaso		(substituted off) 77'
CF	26	Christian Kofane		(substituted off) 77'
Substitutes:
MF	25	Junior Dina Ebimbe		(substituted on) 24'	(substituted off) 58'
FW	7	Georges-Kévin Nkoudou		(substituted on) 58'
FW	21	Karl Etta Eyong		(substituted on) 77'
MF	8	Jean Onana		(substituted on) 77'
FW	9	Frank Magri		(substituted on) 77'
Manager:
David Pagou

GK	1	Yassine Bounou
RB	2	Achraf Hakimi (c)
CB	5	Nayef Aguerd
CB	25	Adam Masina
LB	3	Noussair Mazraoui
DM	24	Neil El Aynaoui
RM	10	Brahim Díaz		(substituted off) 90'
CM	23	Bilal El Khannouss	(yellow card) 50'	(substituted off) 68'
CM	11	Ismael Saibari		(substituted off) 86'
LM	17	Abde Ezzalzouli		(substituted off) 86'
CF	20	Ayoub El Kaabi		(substituted off) 67'
Substitutes:
FW	19	Youssef En-Nesyri		(substituted on) 67'
MF	4	Sofyan Amrabat		(substituted on) 68'
MF	14	Oussama Targhalline		(substituted on) 86'
FW	9	Soufiane Rahimi	(yellow card) 87'	(substituted on) 86'
FW	7	Hamza Igamane		(substituted on) 90'
Manager:
Walid Regragui

=== Algeria vs Nigeria ===
10 January 2026
17:00

Algeria	0–2	Nigeria
	Report	Osimhen 47'; Adams 57'

Marrakesh Stadium, Marrakesh
Attendance: 32,452
Referee: Issa Sy (Senegal)

Algeria	Nigeria

GK	23	Luca Zidane
RB	25	Rafik Belghali
CB	2	Aïssa Mandi
CB	21	Ramy Bensebaini
LB	15	Rayan Aït-Nouri	(yellow card) 62'
CM	14	Hicham Boudaoui	(yellow card) 75'	(substituted off) 81'
CM	6	Ramiz Zerrouki	(yellow card) 15'	(substituted off) 60'
RW	7	Riyad Mahrez (c)		(substituted off) 60'
AM	22	Ibrahim Maza		(substituted off) 61'
LW	17	Farès Chaïbi
CF	18	Mohamed Amoura	(yellow card) 28'	(substituted off) 81'
Substitutes:
FW	9	Baghdad Bounedjah		(substituted on) 60'
FW	11	Anis Hadj Moussa	(yellow card) 68'	(substituted on) 60'
FW	27	Adil Boulbina		(substituted on) 61'
FW	28	Redouane Berkane		(substituted on) 81'
MF	8	Himad Abdelli		(substituted on) 81'
Manager:
(Bosnia and Herzegovina) Vladimir Petković

GK	23	Stanley Nwabali	(yellow card) 85'
RB	2	Bright Osayi-Samuel		(substituted off) 90+5'
CB	6	Semi Ajayi
CB	21	Calvin Bassey
LB	13	Bruno Onyemaechi
CM	8	Frank Onyeka		(substituted off) 69'
CM	4	Wilfred Ndidi (c)	(yellow card) 67'	(substituted off) 69'
CM	17	Alex Iwobi
AM	7	Ademola Lookman		(substituted off) 86'
CF	9	Victor Osimhen
CF	22	Akor Adams		(substituted off) 86'
Substitutes:
MF	18	Raphael Onyedika		(substituted on) 69'
FW	15	Moses Simon	(yellow card) 90+9'	(substituted on) 69'
DF	20	Chidozie Awaziem		(substituted on) 86'
MF	10	Fisayo Dele-Bashiru		(substituted on) 86'
DF	5	Igoh Ogbu		(substituted on) 90+5'
Manager:
(Mali) Éric Chelle

=== Egypt vs Ivory Coast ===
10 January 2026
20:00

Egypt	3–2	Ivory Coast
Marmoush 4'; Rabia 32'; Salah 52'	Report	Fatouh 40' (o.g.); Doué 73'

Adrar Stadium, Agadir
Attendance: 31,213
Referee: Mustapha Ghorbal (Algeria)

Egypt	Ivory Coast

GK	23	Mohamed El Shenawy	(yellow card) 90+4'
CB	6	Yasser Ibrahim
CB	4	Hossam Abdelmaguid	(yellow card) 69'
CB	5	Ramy Rabia
RM	3	Mohamed Hany
CM	19	Marwan Attia
CM	14	Hamdy Fathy
LM	13	Ahmed Fatouh
AM	8	Emam Ashour		(substituted off) 78'
CF	10	Mohamed Salah (c)
CF	22	Omar Marmoush		(substituted off) 90+2'
Substitutes:
FW	7	Trézéguet		(substituted on) 78'
FW	11	Mostafa Mohamed		(substituted on) 90+2'
Manager:
Hossam Hassan

GK	1	Yahia Fofana
RB	17	Guéla Doué
CB	7	Odilon Kossounou	(substituted off) 90+3'
CB	21	Evan Ndicka
LB	3	Ghislain Konan
DM	18	Ibrahim Sangaré
CM	8	Franck Kessié (c)	(substituted off) 70'
CM	19	Christ Inao Oulaï	(substituted off) 89'
RF	15	Amad Diallo
CF	22	Evann Guessand	(substituted off) 80'
LF	26	Yan Diomande	(substituted off) 89'
Substitutes:
FW	11	Jean-Philippe Krasso	(substituted on) 70'
FW	9	Vakoun Issouf Bayo	(substituted on) 80'
FW	24	Bazoumana Touré	(substituted on) 89'
MF	6	Seko Fofana	(substituted on) 89'
Manager:
Emerse Faé

== Semi-finals ==
=== Senegal vs Egypt ===
14 January 2026
18:00

Senegal	1–0	Egypt
Mané 78'	Report

Tangier Grand Stadium, Tangier
Attendance: 52,079
Referee: Pierre Atcho (Gabon)

Senegal	Egypt

GK	16	Édouard Mendy
RB	15	Krépin Diatta
CB	3	Kalidou Koulibaly (c)	(yellow card) 17'	(substituted off) 23'
CB	19	Moussa Niakhaté
LB	25	El Hadji Malick Diouf
DM	5	Idrissa Gueye
CM	7	Habib Diarra	(yellow card) 41'	(substituted off) 46'
CM	26	Pape Gueye		(substituted off) 90+1'
RF	13	Iliman Ndiaye		(substituted off) 85'
CF	11	Nicolas Jackson		(substituted off) 85'
LF	10	Sadio Mané
Substitutes:
DF	2	Mamadou Sarr		(substituted on) 23'
MF	8	Lamine Camara		(substituted on) 46'
FW	12	Cherif Ndiaye		(substituted on) 85'
FW	18	Ismaïla Sarr		(substituted on) 85'
MF	6	Pathé Ciss		(substituted on) 90+1'
Manager:
Pape Thiaw

GK	23	Mohamed El Shenawy
CB	6	Yasser Ibrahim
CB	4	Hossam Abdelmaguid	(yellow card) 6'
CB	5	Ramy Rabia		(substituted off) 81'
RM	3	Mohamed Hany
CM	19	Marwan Attia
CM	14	Hamdy Fathy		(substituted off) 90+4'
LM	13	Ahmed Fatouh		(substituted off) 46'
AM	8	Emam Ashour		(substituted off) 83'
CF	10	Mohamed Salah (c)
CF	22	Omar Marmoush
Substitutes:
FW	7	Trézéguet		(substituted on) 46'
MF	25	Zizo		(substituted on) 81'
FW	11	Mostafa Mohamed		(substituted on) 83'
FW	9	Salah Mohsen		(substituted on) 90+4'
Manager:
Hossam Hassan

=== Nigeria vs Morocco ===
14 January 2026
21:00

Nigeria	0–0 (a.e.t.)	Morocco
	Report
Penalties
Onuachu (penalty scored); Chukwueze (penalty missed); Dele-Bashiru (penalty scored); Onyemaechi (penalty missed)	2–4	(penalty scored) El Aynaoui; (penalty missed) Igamane; (penalty scored) Ben Seghir; (penalty scored) Hakimi; (penalty scored) En-Nesyri

Prince Moulay Abdellah Stadium, Rabat
Attendance: 65,458
Referee: Daniel Nii Laryea (Ghana)

Nigeria	Morocco

GK	23	Stanley Nwabali
RB	2	Bright Osayi-Samuel
CB	6	Semi Ajayi
CB	21	Calvin Bassey	(yellow card) 33'
LB	13	Bruno Onyemaechi
CM	8	Frank Onyeka		(substituted off) 120+1'
CM	18	Raphael Onyedika	(yellow card) 77'	(substituted off) 83'
CM	17	Alex Iwobi
AM	7	Ademola Lookman
CF	22	Akor Adams		(substituted off) 98'
CF	9	Victor Osimhen (c)		(substituted off) 118'
Substitutes:
FW	15	Moses Simon		(substituted on) 83'
MF	10	Fisayo Dele-Bashiru		(substituted on) 98'
FW	19	Paul Onuachu		(substituted on) 118'
FW	11	Samuel Chukwueze		(substituted on) 120+1'
Manager:
(Mali) Éric Chelle

GK	1	Yassine Bounou
RB	2	Achraf Hakimi (c)
CB	5	Nayef Aguerd
CB	25	Adam Masina
LB	3	Noussair Mazraoui
DM	24	Neil El Aynaoui
RM	10	Brahim Díaz	(substituted off) 107'
CM	23	Bilal El Khannouss	(substituted off) 84'
CM	11	Ismael Saibari	(substituted off) 118'
LM	17	Abde Ezzalzouli	(substituted off) 103'
CF	20	Ayoub El Kaabi	(substituted off) 84'
Substitutes:
FW	7	Hamza Igamane	(substituted on) 84'
MF	14	Oussama Targhalline	(substituted on) 84'
FW	19	Youssef En-Nesyri	(substituted on) 103'
FW	16	Ilias Akhomach	(substituted on) 107'
MF	13	Eliesse Ben Seghir	(substituted on) 118'
Manager:
Walid Regragui

== Third place play-off ==
17 January 2026
17:00

Egypt	0–0	Nigeria
	Report
Penalties
Salah (penalty missed); Marmoush (penalty missed); Rabia (penalty scored); Saber (penalty scored)	2–4	(penalty missed) Dele-Bashiru; (penalty scored) Adams; (penalty scored) Simon; (penalty scored) Iwobi; (penalty scored) Lookman

Mohammed V Stadium, Casablanca
Attendance: 38,113
Referee: Jalal Jayed (Morocco)

Egypt	Nigeria

GK	26	Mostafa Shobeir
RB	3	Mohamed Hany
CB	14	Hamdy Fathy
CB	5	Ramy Rabia
LB	2	Khaled Sobhi
CM	25	Zizo	(substituted off) 60'
CM	17	Mohanad Lasheen
RW	10	Mohamed Salah (c)
AM	8	Emam Ashour
LW	7	Trézéguet	(substituted off) 60'
CF	11	Mostafa Mohamed	(substituted off) 73'
Substitutes:
FW	22	Omar Marmoush	(substituted on) 60'
MF	27	Mahmoud Saber	(substituted on) 60'
FW	20	Ibrahim Adel	(substituted on) 73'
Manager:
Hossam Hassan

GK	23	Stanley Nwabali
RB	2	Bright Osayi-Samuel		(substituted off) 65'
CB	6	Semi Ajayi		(substituted off) 90+3'
CB	5	Igoh Ogbu	(yellow card) 87'
LB	13	Bruno Onyemaechi
RM	11	Samuel Chukwueze		(substituted off) 90+1'
CM	10	Fisayo Dele-Bashiru
CM	18	Raphael Onyedika
LM	15	Moses Simon (c)	(yellow card) 45'
CF	22	Akor Adams
CF	19	Paul Onuachu	(yellow card) 39'	(substituted off) 46'
Substitutes:
FW	7	Ademola Lookman		(substituted on) 46'
MF	17	Alex Iwobi		(substituted on) 65'
FW	24	Chidera Ejuke		(substituted on) 90+1'
DF	20	Chidozie Awaziem		(substituted on) 90+3'
Manager:
(Mali) Éric Chelle

== Final ==
18 January 2026
20:00

Senegal	0–3 Awarded	Morocco
P. Gueye 94'	Report

Prince Moulay Abdellah Stadium, Rabat
Attendance: 66,526
Referee: Jean-Jacques Ndala (DR Congo)

Senegal	Morocco

GK	16	Édouard Mendy	(yellow card) 90+21'
RB	24	Antoine Mendy		(substituted off) 76'
CB	2	Mamadou Sarr	(yellow card) 113'
CB	19	Moussa Niakhaté
LB	25	El Hadji Malick Diouf	(yellow card) 90+10'	(substituted off) 106'
DM	5	Idrissa Gueye (c)		(substituted off) 112'
CM	8	Lamine Camara	(yellow card) 24'	(substituted off) 77'
CM	26	Pape Gueye
RF	13	Iliman Ndiaye		(substituted off) 77'
CF	11	Nicolas Jackson		(substituted off) 90+3'
LF	10	Sadio Mané
Substitutes:
DF	4	Abdoulaye Seck		(substituted on) 76'
FW	18	Ismaïla Sarr	(yellow card) 90+9'	(substituted on) 77'
FW	27	Ibrahim Mbaye		(substituted on) 77'
FW	12	Cherif Ndiaye		(substituted on) 90+3'
DF	14	Ismail Jakobs		(substituted on) 106'
MF	6	Pathé Ciss		(substituted on) 112'
Manager:
Pape Thiaw

GK	1	Yassine Bounou
RB	2	Achraf Hakimi (c)
CB	5	Nayef Aguerd
CB	25	Adam Masina		(substituted off) 89'
LB	3	Noussair Mazraoui		(substituted off) 98'
DM	24	Neil El Aynaoui
RM	10	Brahim Díaz		(substituted off) 98'
CM	23	Bilal El Khannouss		(substituted off) 80'
CM	11	Ismael Saibari		(substituted off) 90+4'
LM	17	Abde Ezzalzouli
CF	20	Ayoub El Kaabi		(substituted off) 80'
Substitutes:
FW	19	Youssef En-Nesyri	(yellow card) 112'	(substituted on) 80'
MF	14	Oussama Targhalline		(substituted on) 80'
DF	18	Jawad El Yamiq		(substituted on) 89'
DF	26	Anass Salah-Eddine	(yellow card) 90+21'	(substituted on) 90+4'
FW	16	Ilias Akhomach		(substituted on) 98'
FW	7	Hamza Igamane		(substituted on) 98'
Manager:
Walid Regragui

Man of the Match:
Pape Gueye (Senegal)

Assistant referees:
Guylain Bongele Ngila (DR Congo)
Gradel Mwanya Mbilizi (DR Congo)
Fourth official:
Abongile Tom (South Africa)
Reserve assistant referee:
Styven Moutsassi (Congo)
Video assistant referee:
Pierre Atcho (Gabon)
Assistant video assistant referees:
Letticia Viana (Eswatini)
Stephen Yiembé (Kenya)

== See also ==
- List of Africa Cup of Nations finals
