= Alex Moucketou-Moussounda =

Gabonese footballer

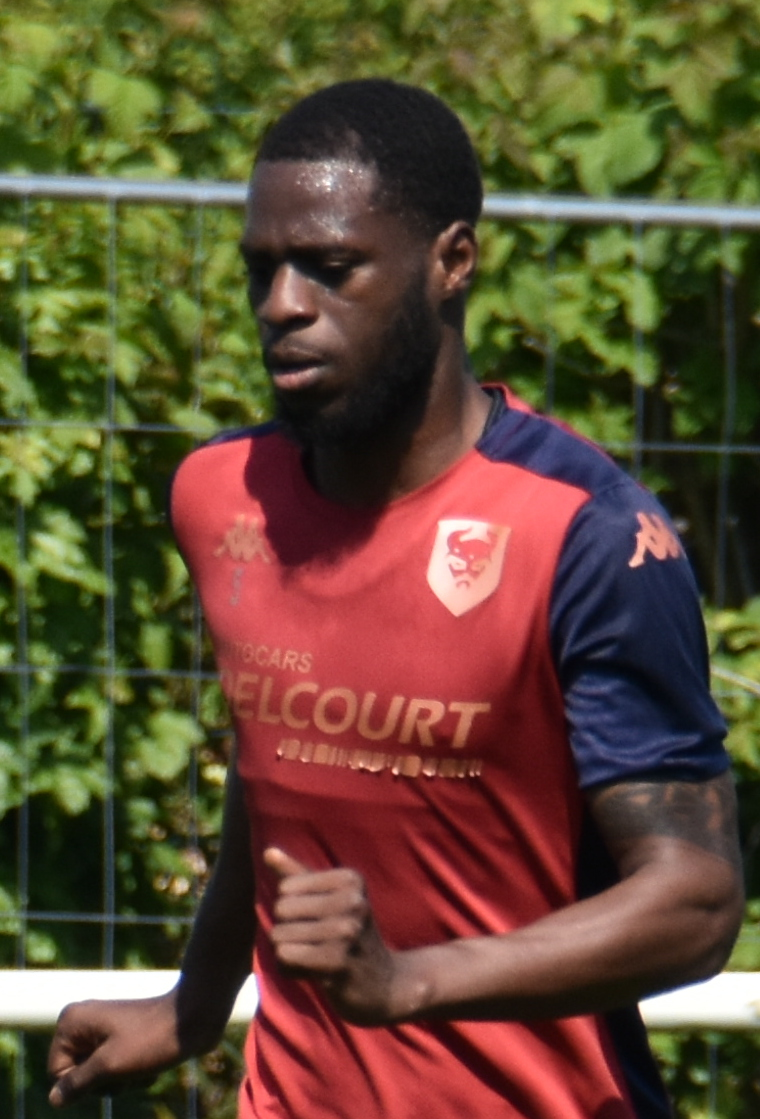
- Alex Moucketou in 2025

Personal information
- Full name: Alex Yowan Kevin Moucketou-Moussounda
- Date of birth: 10 October 2000 (age 26)
- Place of birth: Libreville, Gabon
- Height: 1.84 m (6 ft 0 in)
- Position: Centre-back

Team information
- Current team: Hapoel Petah Tikva
- Number: 5

Senior career*
| Years | Team | Apps | (Gls) |
| 2018–2020 | Mangasport | | |
| 2020–2021 | AS Bouenguidi | | |
| 2021–2026 | Aris Limassol | 80 | (1) |
| 2025 | → Caen (loan) | 9 | (0) |
| 2026 | → Hapoel Petah Tikva (loan) | 13 | (0) |
| 2026– | Hapoel Petah Tikva | 5 | (0) |

International career^{‡}
| 2021– | Gabon | 32 | (2) |
- * Club domestic league appearances and goals as of 18 September 2026 ‡ National team caps and goals as of 23:01, 29 September 2026 (UTC)

Alex Yowan Kevin Moucketou-Moussounda (born 10 October 2000) is a Gabonese professional footballer who plays as a centre-back for Hapoel Petah Tikva, and the Gabon national team.

== Club career ==
=== Early career ===
Moucketou-Moussounda began his senior career in his native Gabon with Mangasport before moving to AS Bouenguidi in 2020.

=== Aris Limassol ===
In the summer of 2021 he moved to Aris Limassol in the Cypriot top league. He made his debut against Ethnikos Achna on 2 November.

==== Loan to Caen ====
On 2 January 2025, Moucketou-Moussounda signed for Ligue 2 club Caen on a six-month loan with an option-to-buy.

== International career ==
On 11 October 2021, Moucketou-Moussounda made his debut for Gabon in a 2–0 win over Angola. He was called up to the Gabon squad for a series of 2023 Africa Cup of Nations qualifiers in December 2021, playing in three matches and scoring a goal.

== Career statistics ==
=== Club ===
As of 18 September 2026

Appearances and goals by club, season and competition
| Club | Season | League | | | Cup | | Continental | | Other | | Total | |
| Club | Season | Division | Apps | Goals | Apps | Goals | Apps | Goals | Apps | Goals | Apps | Goals |
|---|---|---|---|---|---|---|---|---|---|---|---|---|
| AS Bouenguidi | 2020–21 | National Foot 1 | | | | | 2 (Note: Appearances in CAF Champions League) | 0 | | | 2 | 0 |
| Aris Limassol | 2021–22 | Cypriot First Division | 11 | 0 | 0 | 0 | — | | — | | 11 | 0 |
| Aris Limassol | 2022–23 | Cypriot First Division | 26 | 0 | 1 | 0 | 1 (Note: Appearance in UEFA Conference League) | 0 | — | | 28 | 0 |
| Aris Limassol | 2023–24 | Cypriot First Division | 29 | 0 | 3 | 0 | 12 (Note: Four appearances in UEFA Champions League and eight appearances and one goal in UEFA Europa League) | 1 | 1 (Note: Appearances in the Cypriot Super Cup) | 0 | 45 | 1 |
| Aris Limassol | 2024–25 | Cypriot First Division | 2 | 0 | 0 | 0 | — | | — | | 2 | 0 |
| Aris Limassol | 2025–26 | Cypriot First Division | 12 | 1 | 1 | 0 | 2 (Note: Appearances in the UEFA Conference League) | 0 | 1 (Note: Appearances in the Cypriot Super Cup) | 0 | 13 | 1 |
| Aris Limassol | Total | | 80 | 1 | 5 | 0 | 15 | 1 | 1 | 0 | 101 | 2 |
| Caen (loan) | 2024–25 | Ligue 2 | 9 | 0 | — | | — | | — | | 9 | 0 |
| Hapoel Petah Tikva (loan) | 2025–26 | Israeli Premier League | 13 | 0 | — | | — | | — | | 13 | 0 |
| Hapoel Petah Tikva | 2026–27 | Israeli Premier League | 5 | 0 | 0 | 0 | — | | — | | 5 | 0 |
| Career total | | | 103 | 1 | 5 | 0 | 17 | 1 | 1 | 0 | 126 | 2 |

=== International ===
As of match played 29 September 2026

Appearances and goals by national team and year
| National team | Year | Apps | Goals |
|---|---|---|---|
| Gabon | 2021 | 3 | 1 |
| Gabon | 2022 | 7 | 0 |
| Gabon | 2023 | 5 | 0 |
| Gabon | 2024 | 9 | 0 |
| Gabon | 2025 | 6 | 1 |
| Gabon | 2026 | 2 | 0 |
| Total | | 32 | 2 |

Scores and results list Gabon's goal tally first, score column indicates score after each Moussounda goal.

List of international goals scored by Alex Moucketou-Moussounda
| No. | Date | Venue | Opponent | Score | Result | Competition |
|---|---|---|---|---|---|---|
| 1 | 11 October 2021 | Stade de Franceville, Franceville, Gabon | Angola | 2–0 | 2–0 | 2022 FIFA World Cup qualification |
| 2 | 28 December 2025 | Adrar Stadium, Agadir, Morocco | Mozambique | 2–3 | 2–3 | 2025 Africa Cup of Nations |
