= Gabon national football team =

Men's association football team

Gabon
- Nickname(s): Les Panthères (The Panthers)
- Association: Fédération Gabonaise de Football (FEGAFOOT)
- Confederation: CAF (Africa)
- Sub-confederation: UNIFFAC (Central Africa)
- Head coach: Sébastien Migné
- Captain: Vacant
- Most caps: Bruno Ecuele Manga (118)
- Top scorer: Pierre-Emerick Aubameyang (40)
- Home stadium: Stade d'Angondjé
- FIFA code: GAB
First colours

FIFA ranking
- Current: 87 ▼2 (18 November 2026)
- Highest: 30 (July 2009)
- Lowest: 125 (April–May 2003)

First international
- Upper Volta 5–4 Gabon (Madagascar; 13 April 1960)

Biggest win
- Gabon 7–0 Benin (Libreville, Gabon; 2 April 1995)

Biggest defeat
- Cameroon 6–0 Gabon (Abidjan, Ivory Coast; 26 December 1961); Morocco 6–0 Gabon (Rabat, Morocco; 15 November 2006)

Africa Cup of Nations
- Appearances: 9 (first in 1994)
- Best result: Quarter-finals, 1996 and 2012

The Gabon national football team (French: Équipe de football du Gabon) represents Gabon in men's international football. The team's nickname is The Panthers and it is governed by the Gabonese Football Federation. They have never qualified for the FIFA World Cup, but have qualified nine times (as of 2025) for the Africa Cup of Nations. Gabon is a member of both FIFA and Confederation of African Football (CAF).

== History ==
=== 1960s ===
Gabon made their debut on 13 April 1960 by entering the first Friendship Games (Jeux de L'Amitié) tournament, created for French-speaking African countries (a precursor to the modern African Games), held in Antananarivo, Madagascar. In the First Round they were drawn against Upper Volta (now Burkina Faso), who were also making their debut, and lost 5–4, despite leading 3–2 at half-time. They did not play another match for over a year and a half, until the next time the tournament was staged, in December 1961 in Abidjan, Ivory Coast. They were drawn in Pool 3 alongside Cameroon and Senegal. Gabon began the tournament with a 3–2 defeat to Senegal on Christmas Day, before being thrashed 6–0 by Cameroon on Boxing Day, finishing bottom of their group. A few months after the tournament, the Gabonese Football Federation (Federation Gabonaise de Football) was formed to officially oversee the development of the national team and the domestic game. The new association would not have to wait long for their first win, as in their very next match on 14 July 1962 they defeated the Congo 3–1 in their first match on home soil. They played two more matches in 1962, a 1–1 home draw with Cameroon on 20 August, a vast improvement over their previous meeting, and a 3–1 away defeat to the Congo on 16 September, before entering the third and final Friendship Games held in April 1963 in Dakar, Senegal. They were drawn in Group C, along with British Gambia, the France amateur team, and Upper Volta. They opened on 12 April with a strong 4–0 win over Upper Volta, but were comfortably beaten 3–0 by the French amateurs two days later. They drew their final game 2–2 with British Gambia on 16 April and finished second in the group, a marked improvement over their previous two appearances at the tournament; however only the group winners progressed and therefore Gabon were eliminated. A few months later, Gabon entered qualification for the 1966 FIFA World Cup held in England. However, on 8 October 1964 they withdrew from the competition, along with all the other African entrants, in protest at FIFA's decision to only award one finals place to all of Africa, Asia and Oceania.

As a result of this boycott, Gabon did not play another match for over two years until August 1965, when they hosted a friendly double-header against Nigeria, drawing 2–2 on 28 August and losing 4–1 the next day. At the 35th FIFA Congress held in London, England on 6 July 1966, Gabon were officially admitted as full members of FIFA. They played their next match on 2 December 1966 when they suffered a 4–3 defeat against the Democratic Republic of the Congo, before playing them again on 4 January 1967 at home, this time winning 1–0. They played one more friendly, a 3–0 home defeat to the Ivory Coast on 28 March, before entering qualification for the 1968 Olympic football tournament, held in Mexico. In the First Round, they were drawn against Guinea with whom they drew the first leg 0–0 at home on 18 June, before being routed in the second leg 6–1, on 9 July. In 1967, they also became full members of CAF. Following on from the Olympic qualifiers, Gabon did not play another match for over two years until they travelled to Dahomey (now Benin) on 24 August 1969 to play a friendly, which they lost 1–0.

=== 1970s ===
Gabon then did not play for over a year, before entering qualification for the Africa Cup of Nations for the first time. Their attempt to qualify for the 1972 tournament held in Cameroon fell at the first hurdle however, as they were drawn against Ivory Coast in the First Round. They lost the first leg at home 2–1 on 8 November 1970, and were defeated 1–0 away two weeks later. Gabon then entered qualification for the 1972 Olympic football tournament held in West Germany. In the First Round they were drawn against Cameroon. Having lost the first leg 3–2 in Libreville on 30 May 1971, Gabon forfeited the tie as they did not travel to Yaoundé to contest the return leg. Following this ignominious exit, Gabon entered qualification for the 1974 FIFA World Cup held in West Germany, and were due to play Cameroon in the First Round the Summer of 1972, however they withdrew before the matches could be played. As a result of this withdrawal, they did not play another match for over a year until they entered the football tournament at the 1972 Central African Cup (a precursor to the Central African Games) held in Brazzaville, Congo. The 5-team round robin tournament included, alongside Gabon; Cameroon, the Central African Republic, the Congo, and Chad. They played their first match on 16 July against the Congo, losing 3–0. Two days later they were defeated 3–1 by the Central African Republic and on 20 July they were soundly beaten by Cameroon, 4–0. However they salvaged some pride by beating Chad 1–0 in their final match on 22 July to avoid the bottom spot. Furthermore, this tournament doubled up as a qualification group for the 1973 All-Africa Games football tournament, and as Gabon did not win the group, they failed to qualify. A year later they entered qualification for the 1974 African Cup of Nations held in Egypt, and were due to play the Central African Republic in the summer of 1973, however they once again withdrew before a ball was kicked.

As a result, Gabon did not play a single match for almost 4 years until they thrashed São Tomé and Príncipe 6–1 at home in a friendly in May 1976, which was São Tomé and Príncipe's first international match. A few weeks later Gabon hosted the inaugural Central African Games. In the football tournament, they were drawn into Group B alongside Burundi, Cameroon and Rwanda. They played their opening match on 28 June, registering a convincing 4–1 win over Burundi. Then, on 1 July they played out a 1–1 draw against Zaire who had travelled to Gabon to play each team in Group B in a friendly capacity, and had not entered the competition proper. On 5 July Gabon gained another impressive victory, beating Rwanda 3–0. In their final group game on 7 July they held neighbours Cameroon to creditable 0–0 draw, thus securing 2nd place (having only missed out on the top spot via goal difference) and qualification for the semi-finals. On 9 July they faced Group A winners the Congo, and were narrowly beaten 1–0. However, two days later they managed to clinch 3rd place with a 3–1 victory of the Central African Republic, to put the seal on an impressive performance in their own tournament. A year later, Gabon entered qualification for the 1978 African Cup of Nations held in Ghana. After being given a bye in the First Round, they were drawn against the Congo in the Second. They lost the first leg away 3–2 on 17 July 1977, and drew the second at home 3–3 on 31 July, losing 6–5 on aggregate. Later that year, they entered a qualification tournament for the football competition at the 1978 All-Africa Games held in Algiers, Algeria. The qualification tournament for their zone, which was held in Cameroon, consisted of 2 groups, with the top two teams in each group progressing to the semi-finals. In Gabon's group (B) were Burundi, the Congo and Equatorial Guinea. They beat Equatorial Guinea 2–0 in their opening match on Christmas Eve, defeated the Congo 1–0 on Boxing Day and beat Burundi 2–0 two days later. With 3 wins out of 3, they topped their group and faced Group A runners-up Chad in the semi-finals to whom they lost 3–1 on New Year's Eve, and therefore failed to qualify, as only the tournament winner went to the finals. A few months later in February 1978, they hosted a friendly against Nigeria, which they lost 1–0. In January 1979, they registered a 2–2 away draw against Rwanda, before defeating Ivory Coast 2–1 at home in April.

=== 2010s ===
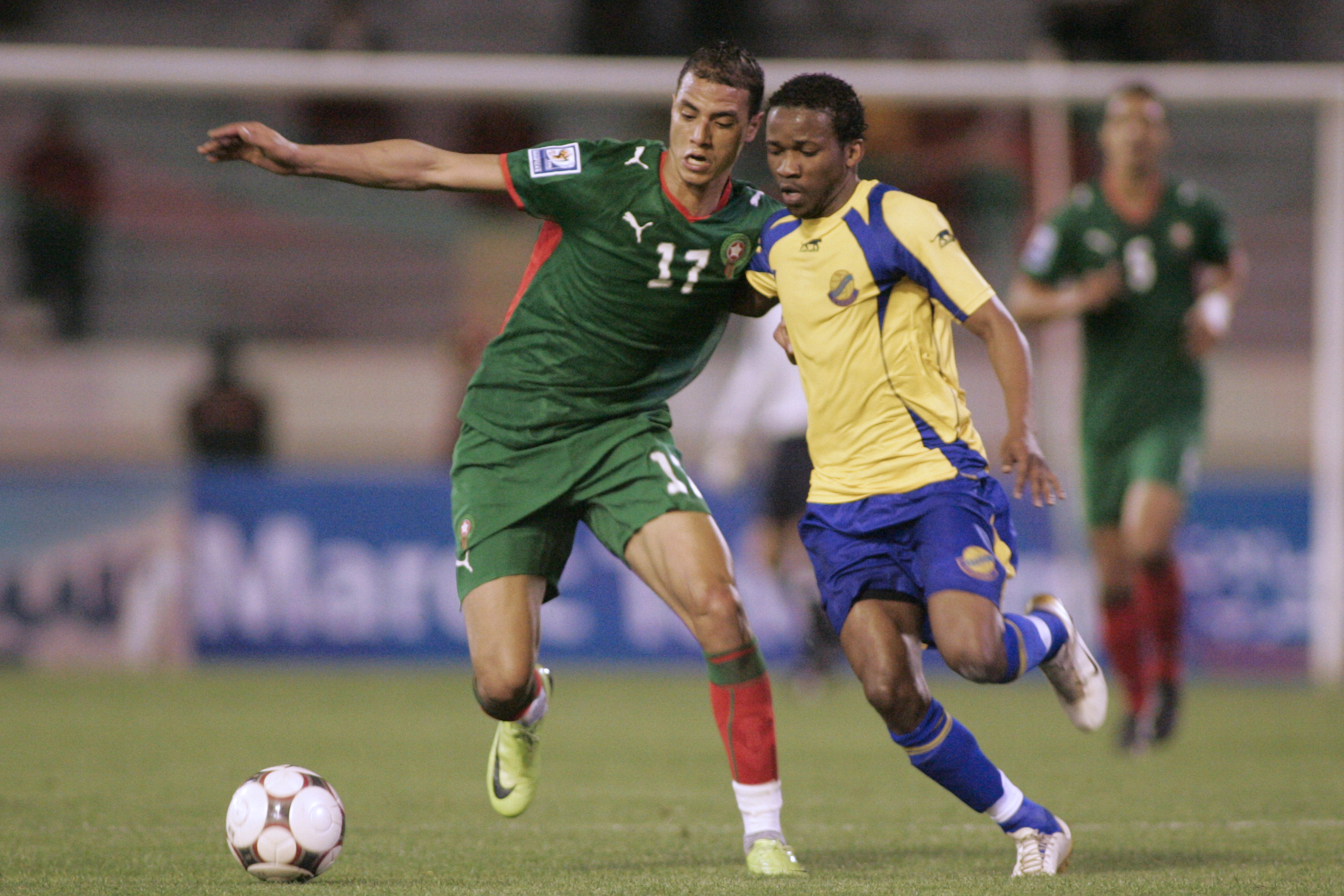
Stéphane N'Guéma and Marouane Chamakh during the match Morocco and Gabon at the 2010 FIFA World Cup qualification.

In the 2010 Africa Cup of Nations, Gabon upset Cameroon 1–0 and had a good chance of progressing to the quarter-finals after a scoreless draw against Tunisia. However, Gabon lost 2–1 to Zambia as it finished in its group with a three-way tie with Zambia and Cameroon. Gabon only scored twice in the group stage and were eliminated on the goals scored tiebreaker. In 2012 Africa Cup of Nations, Gabon co-hosted the tournament as it won their group matches: 2–0 against Niger, 3–2 against Morocco, and 1–0 against Tunisia. The second match saw Gabon qualify for its first quarter-final since 1996 in the most dramatic circumstances. Gabon had come back to lead 2–1 only for Morocco to tie the match in early stoppage time. However, on the final play of the game, Gabon scored in the eighth minute of stoppage time, from a direct free kick. Eventually, Gabon lost 5–4 in penalties (1–1 a.e.t) in the quarterfinal against Mali, after a penalty missed by Pierre-Emerick Aubameyang, who had scored three goals in the tournament.

Gabon began its 2014 World Cup qualifying campaign in the second round in Group E as it was drawn with Niger, Burkina Faso, and Congo. Despite opening its campaign with a scoreless draw against Niger, Gabon lost 3–0 due to having fielded ineligible player Charly Moussono. After four qualifiers, Gabon scored only one goal, but thanks to an Aubameyang hat-trick on 15 June 2013, Gabon stayed in contention for a play-off berth with a 4–1 victory over Niger. However, Burkina Faso eliminated Gabon in the final qualifier with the 1–0 result as Gabon finished third in its group.

For the 2013 Africa Cup of Nations, Gabon was drawn to qualify against Togo. Even though Daniel Cousin scored in each leg against Togo, Gabon missed out on the 2013 Africa Cup of Nations as it lost 3–2 on aggregate. A year later, Gabon played six qualifiers for the 2015 Africa Cup of Nations as it was drawn with Burkina Faso, Angola and Lesotho. Despite a stunning 1–1 result in Lesotho in qualifying, Gabon finished ahead of Burkina Faso to top the group as it qualified for the tournament with a game to spare in Angola. In January 2015, Gabon was drawn along with Burkina Faso, Congo and Equatorial Guinea. However, its 2–0 victory on the opening day of the tournament were all the points Gabon achieved during the tournament as it suffered a shocking exit in the group stage.

=== 2020s ===
Following a group stage exit at the 2025 Africa Cup of Nations where Gabon lost all three matches, the Gabonese government took the extraordinary step of suspending the national team. Additionally, Gabon's sports minister Simplice-Desire Mamboula sacked head coach Thierry Mouyouma and banned both team captain Bruno Ecuele Manga and second all-time top scorer Pierre-Emerick Aubameyang.

== Team image ==
=== Kit sponsorship ===
Kit providers	Period
(France) Airness	2006–2011
(Germany) Puma	2012–2016
(Germany) Adidas	2017–2018
(Italy) Kappa	2019–2023
(Germany) Puma	2024–2025
(Morocco) AB Sport	2025–

== Results and fixtures ==
The following is a list of match results in the last 12 months, as well as any future matches that have been scheduled.

Win Draw Loss Fixture

=== 2025 ===
13 November 2026 World Cup qualification	Nigeria	4–1 (a.e.t.)	Gabon	Rabat, Morocco
	Adams 78'; Ejuke 97'; Osimhen 102', 109'	Report	M. Lemina 89'	Stadium: Moulay Hassan Stadium; Referee: Abongile Tom (South Africa)

24 December 2025 AFCON GS	Cameroon	1–0	Gabon	Agadir, Morocco
21:00 UTC+1	Etta Eyong 6'	Report		Stadium: Adrar Stadium; Referee: Amin Mohamed Omar (Egypt)

28 December 2025 AFCON GS	Gabon	2–3	Mozambique	Agadir, Morocco
13:30 UTC+1	Aubameyang 45+5'; Moussounda 76'	Report	Bangal 37'; Catamo 42' (pen.); Calila 52'	Stadium: Adrar Stadium; Referee: Mehrez Melki (Tunisia)

31 December 2025 AFCON GS	Gabon	2–3	Ivory Coast	Marrakesh, Morocco
20:00 UTC+1	Kanga 11'; Bouanga 21'	Report	Krasso 44'; Guessand 84'; Touré 90+1'	Stadium: Marrakesh Stadium; Referee: Omar Artan (Somalia)

=== 2026 ===
27 March 2026 FIFA Series	Uzbekistan	3–1	Gabon	Tashkent, Uzbekistan
19:00 UTC+5	Shomurodov 14'; Urozov 59'; Odilov 90+4'	Report	Averlant 6'	Stadium: Milliy Stadium; Referee: Abdullo Davlatov (Tajikistan)

30 March 2026 FIFA Series	Gabon	2–2 (3–2 p)	Trinidad and Tobago	Tashkent, Uzbekistan
15:00 UTC+5	Nzé Bagnama (yellow card) 25' (yellow-red card) 56'; Kanga 33'; Essang-Matouti 54'	Report	L. García 53', 90'	Stadium: Pakhtakor Central Stadium; Referee: Ilgiz Tantashev (Uzbekistan)
	Penalties
	Kanga (penalty scored); Lemina (penalty missed); Obiang (penalty missed); Mbemba (penalty scored); Mboula (penalty scored)		(penalty missed) Cardines; (penalty scored) Rochford; (penalty missed) Powder; (penalty scored) Moore; (penalty missed) L. García

25 September 2027 AFCON Qualifiers	Morocco	2–0	Gabon	Rabat, Morocco
20:00 UTC+1	Mazraoui 36'; Rahimi 84'	Report		Stadium: Prince Moulay Abdellah Stadium; Referee: Abongile Tom (South Africa)

29 September 2027 AFCON Qualifiers	Gabon	2–0	Niger	Franceville, Gabon
20:00 UTC+1	Effaghe 53'; Bouanga 77'	Report		Stadium: Franceville Stadium; Referee: Issa Sy (Senegal)

11 November 2027 AFCON Qualifiers	Gabon	2–0	Lesotho	Franceville, Gabon
17:00 UTC+1	Bouanga 65', 79' (pen.)	Report		Stadium: Franceville Stadium; Referee: Daniel Nii Laryea (Ghana)

15 November 2027 AFCON Qualifiers	Lesotho	2–1	Gabon	Polokwane, South Africa
15:00 UTC+2	Mkhwanazi 45+1'; Motebang 49'	Report	Do Marcolino 89'	Stadium: Peter Mokaba Stadium; Referee: Sulaiman Kamara (Sierra Leone)

=== 2027 ===
24 March 2027 AFCON Qualifiers	Gabon	v	Morocco	TBD, Gabon
TBD				Stadium: TBD

28 March 2027 AFCON Qualifiers	Niger	v	Gabon	TBD, Niger
TBD				Stadium: TBD

== Coaching staff ==
Position	Name
Head coach	(France) Sébastien Migné
Assistant coaches	(Gabon) Ghislain Abessolo (Gabon) François Nguema
Goalkeeping coach	(Gabon) Didier Ovono
Fitness coach	(Gabon) Ambroise Engome
Match analyst	(Gabon) Philippe Ndoutou
Performance coach	(Gabon) Fabrice Moubouyou
Team doctors	(Gabon) Dr. Claude Moundoungou (Gabon) Dr. Guillaume Mve Ayong
Physiotherapists	(Gabon) Jean-Pierre Eyi Ebong (Gabon) Maurice Mba Mezui (Gabon) Jules Moubamba (Gabon) Patrice Bivigou
Team coordinator	(Gabon) Lucien Nziengui
Technical director	(Gabon) Jean-Baptiste Ekomo Oyono

=== Coaching history ===
Caretaker managers are listed in italics.

- (France) Jean Prouff (1960)
- (France) André Capelier (1965)
- (France) Robert Vicot (1979)
- (France) Alain de Martigny (1985–1986)
- (Socialist Federal Republic of Yugoslavia) Nedeljko Bulatović (1986–1987)
- (Gabon) Alain Da Costa (1987–1989, 1994–1997, 2000–2002)
- (Germany) Karl-Heinz Weigang (1989–1994)
- (Gabon) Edouard Eroumbengani (1989–1991)
- (France) Robert Pintenat (1991–1992)
- (Belgium) Jean Thissen (1992–1994)
- (France) Serge Devèze (1997–1998)
- (Brazil) Antônio Dumas (1998–2000)
- (Gabon) Claude Rayelomanan (2000)
- (Belgium) Michel De Wolf (2002–2003)
- (Gabon) Claude Albert Mbourounot (2003)
- (Brazil) Jairzinho (2003–2005)
- (Gabon) Raphaël Nzamba-Nzamba (2005–2006)
- (France) Alain Giresse (2006–2010)
- (Germany) Gernot Rohr (2010–2012)
- (Portugal) Paulo Jorge Rebelo Duarte (2012–2013)
- (Gabon) Stéphane Bounguendza (2014)
- (Portugal) Jorge Costa (2014–2016)
- (Portugal) José António Garrido (2016)
- (Spain) José Antonio Camacho (2016–2018)
- (Gabon) Daniel Cousin (2018–2019)
- (France) Patrice Neveu (2019–2023)
- (Gabon) Thierry Mouyouma (2023–2026)
- (Gabon) Anicet Yala (2026)
- (France) Sébastien Migné (2026–)

== Players ==
=== Current squad ===
The following players were called up to the national team squad for the 2027 Africa Cup of Nations qualification matches against Morocco and Niger on 25 and 29 September 2026, respectively.

Caps and goals are correct as of 31 December 2025, following the match against the Ivory Coast national team.

No.	Pos.	Player	Date of birth (age)	Caps	Goals	Club
	GK	Jean-Noël Amonome	24 December 1999 (age 26)	2	0	(South African Football Association) AmaZulu
	GK	François Bekale	15 February 2002 (age 24)	2	0	(Guinean Football Federation) Hafia
	GK	Lukas Mounguenou	11 June 2008 (age 18)	0	0	(French Football Federation) Annecy U19
	DF	Aaron Appindangoyé	20 February 1992 (age 34)	72	2	(Turkish Football Federation) Sivasspor
	DF	Anthony Oyono	12 April 2001 (age 25)	30	0	(Italian Football Federation) Frosinone
	DF	Alex Moucketou-Moussounda	10 October 2000 (age 26)	29	2	(Israel Football Association) Hapoel Petah Tikva
	DF	Jacques Ekomié	19 August 2003 (age 23)	22	0	(Football Association of Wales) Wrexham
	DF	Jérémy Oyono	12 April 2001 (age 25)	13	0	(Italian Football Federation) Spezia
	DF	Urie-Michel Mboula	30 April 2003 (age 23)	9	0	(French Football Federation) Metz
	DF	Jonathan Do Marcolino	10 May 2006 (age 20)	1	0	(French Football Federation) Annecy
	DF	Brad Mantsounga	6 September 2007 (age 19)	0	0	(Royal Belgian Football Association) Virton
	DF	Philippe Ndinga	3 June 2005 (age 21)	0	0	(United States Soccer Federation) Philadelphia Union
	MF	André Biyogo Poko	7 March 1993 (age 33)	82	4	(Turkish Football Federation) Sarıyer
	MF	Guélor Kanga	1 August 1990 (age 36)	77	6	(Turkish Football Federation) Esenler Erokspor
	MF	Didier Ndong	17 June 1994 (age 32)	53	1	Unattached
	MF	Mario Lemina	1 September 1993 (age 33)	42	5	(Turkish Football Federation) Galatasaray
	MF	Henrick Do Marcolino	21 March 2006 (age 20)	0	0	(French Football Federation) Stade Rennes
	FW	Denis Bouanga	11 November 1994 (age 32)	54	16	(United States Soccer Federation) Los Angeles FC
	FW	Jim Allevinah	27 February 1995 (age 31)	36	10	(French Football Federation) Angers
	FW	Shavy Babicka	1 June 2000 (age 26)	20	3	(United Arab Emirates Football Association) United
	FW	Teddy Averlant	2 October 1999 (age 27)	8	1	(French Football Federation) Guingamp
	FW	Rody Junior Effaghe	11 April 2004 (age 22)	5	1	(Cyprus Football Association) Aris Limassol
	FW	Orphé Mbina	2 November 2000 (age 26)	5	0	(Association of Football Federations of Azerbaijan) Sabah
	FW	André-Jordy Ella	24 June 2005 (age 21)	0	0	(Saudi Arabian Football Federation) Al-Faisaly

=== Recent call-ups ===
The following players have also been called up for Gabon in the last twelve months.

Pos.	Player	Date of birth (age)	Caps	Goals	Club	Latest call-up
GK	Loyce Mbaba	4 May 1998 (age 28)	16	0	(Ivory Coast) Stella Club	2026 FIFA Series
DF	Oumar Bagnama	19 May 2001 (age 25)	0	0	(Gabon) Mangasport	2026 FIFA Series
DF	Johann Obiang	5 July 1993 (age 33)	50	0	(France) Orléans	2026 FIFA Series
DF	Mick Omfia	10 December 2000 (age 25)	10	0	(Algeria) Sétif	2026 FIFA Series
DF	Yannis M'Bemba	10 May 2006 (age 20)	4	1	(Netherlands) Dordrecht	2026 FIFA Series
DF	Farhel Owanga	31 December 2005 (age 20)	0	0	(Gabon) Mangasport	2026 FIFA Series
MF	Clench Loufilou	12 April 1999 (age 27)	16	0	(Iraq) Al-Minaa	2026 FIFA Series
MF	Noha Lemina	17 June 2005 (age 21)	5	0	(Switzerland) Yverdon-Sport	2026 FIFA Series
MF	Meshak Babanzila	11 June 2001 (age 25)	1	0	(Spain) CE Europa	2026 FIFA Series
MF	Samaké Nzé Bagnama	28 June 2002 (age 24)	6	0	(Ivory Coast) Stade d'Abidjan	2026 FIFA Series
MF	Eric Bocoum	10 March 1996 (age 30)	9	0	(Iran) Sanat Naft Abadan	2026 FIFA Series
MF	Ben Jorcy Kabinambele	9 August 2005 (age 21)	0	0	(Gabon) Mangasport	2026 FIFA Series
FW	David Sambissa	11 January 1996 (age 30)	20	0	(Turkey) İstanbulspor	2026 FIFA Series
FW	Randy Essang-Matouti	25 July 2003 (age 23)	4	0	(Algeria) USM Khenchela	2026 FIFA Series
FW	Alan Do Marcolino	19 March 2002 (age 24)	10	1	(Portugal) Lusitânia	v. Nigeria, 13 November 2025
FW	Bryan Meyo	31 January 2006 (age 20)	4	2	(France) Lyon II	v. Nigeria, 13 November 2025
^{DEC} Player refused to join the team after the call-up.^{INJ} Player withdrew from the squad due to an injury.^{PRE} Preliminary squad.^{RET} Player has retired from international football.^{SUS} Suspended from the national team.

== Records ==
As of 31 December 2025
Players in bold are still active with Gabon.

=== Most appearances ===
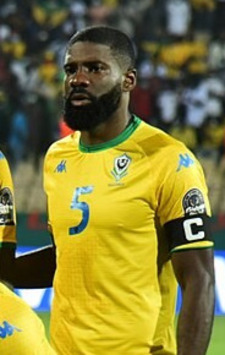
Bruno Ecuele Manga is Gabon's most capped player with 118 appearances.

Rank	Player	Caps	Goals	Career
1	Bruno Ecuélé Manga	118	9	2006–2025
2	Didier Ovono	112	0	2003–2019
3	François Amégasse	110	9	1984–2000
4	Etienne Kassa-Ngoma	92	7	1985–1997
5	**André Biyogo Poko**	89	4	2010–present
6	**Guélor Kanga**	88	6	2012–present
7	Pierre-Emerick Aubameyang	86	40	2009–2026
7	Cédric Moubamba	86	2	1998–2012
9	Valéry Ondo	80	12	1988–2001
10	Lloyd Palun	79	1	2011–2023

=== Top goalscorers ===
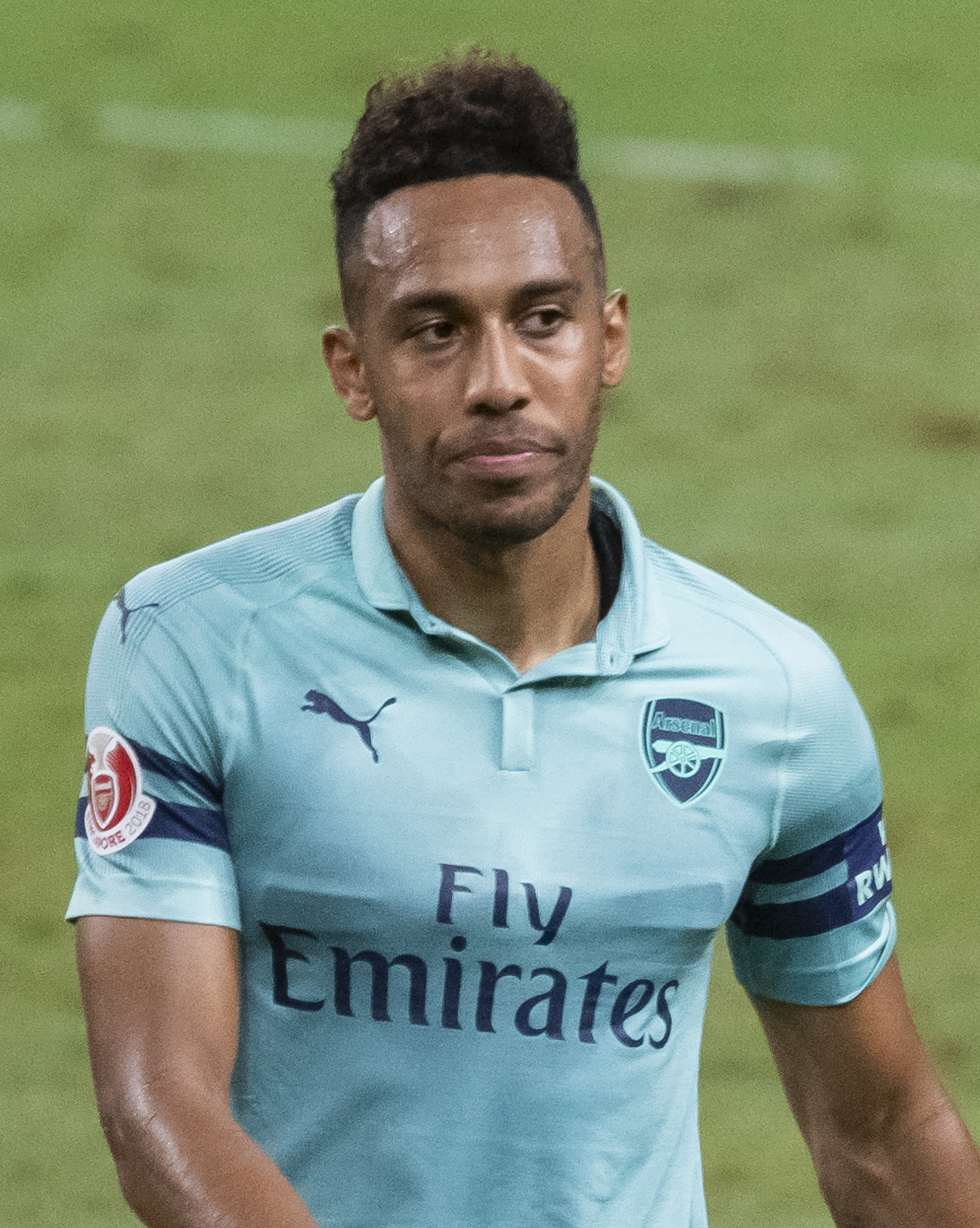
Pierre-Emerick Aubameyang is Gabon's all-time top scorer with 40 goals.

Rank	Player	Goals	Caps	Ratio	Career
1	Pierre-Emerick Aubameyang (list)	40	86	0.47	2009–2026
2	Nzué Nguema	23	77	0.3	1995–2005
3	Guy Roger Nzamba	21	47	0.45	1988–2000
4	**Denis Bouanga**	16	55	0.29	2017–present
5	Michel Minko	14	41	0.34	1984–1990
6	Brice Mackaya	13	43	0.3	1992–1999
6	Daniel Cousin	13	60	0.22	2000–2014
8	**Malick Evouna**	12	37	0.32	2012–present
8	Valéry Ondo	12	80	0.15	1988–2001
10	Bruno Zita Mbanangoyé	11	68	0.16	1999–2012

== Competitive record ==
=== FIFA World Cup ===
FIFA World Cup record									Qualification record					
Year	Round	Position	Pld	W	D*	L	GF	GA	Pld	W	D	L	GF	GA
1930 to 1958	Part of France								Part of France					
(Chile) 1962	Not a FIFA member								Not a FIFA member					
(England) 1966	Withdrew								Withdrew					
(Mexico) 1970	Did not enter								Did not enter					
(West Germany) 1974	Withdrew								Withdrew					
1978 to 1986	Did not enter								Did not enter					
(Italy) 1990	Did not qualify								6	2	0	4	5	9
(United States) 1994	Did not qualify								4	2	1	1	7	5
(France) 1998	Did not qualify								7	2	1	4	4	11
(South Korea) (Japan) 2002	Did not qualify								2	1	0	1	1	2
(Germany) 2006	Did not qualify								12	3	5	4	15	14
(South Africa) 2010	Did not qualify								12	7	0	5	17	10
(Brazil) 2014	Did not qualify								6	2	1	3	5	6
(Russia) 2018	Did not qualify								8	2	3	3	3	8
(Qatar) 2022	Did not qualify								6	2	1	3	7	8
(Canada) (Mexico) (United States) 2026	Did not qualify								11	8	1	2	23	13
(Morocco) (Portugal) (Spain) 2030	To be determined													
(Saudi Arabia) 2034	To be determined													
Total	—	0/15	–	–	–	–	–	–	74	31	13	30	87	86

=== Africa Cup of Nations ===
Africa Cup of Nations record									Qualification record					
Year	Round	Position	Pld	W	D*	L	GF	GA	Pld	W	D*	L	GF	GA
(Sudan) 1957	Part of France								Part of France					
(United Arab Republic) 1959	Part of France								Part of France					
(Ethiopia) 1962	Not affiliated with CAF								Not affiliated with CAF					
(Ghana) 1963	Not affiliated with CAF								Not affiliated with CAF					
(Tunisia) 1965	Not affiliated with CAF								Not affiliated with CAF					
(Ethiopia) 1968	Not affiliated with CAF								Not affiliated with CAF					
(Sudan) 1970	Did not enter								Did not enter					
(Cameroon) 1972	Did not qualify								2	0	0	2	1	3
(Egypt) 1974	Withdrew								Withdrew					
(Ethiopia) 1976	Did not enter								Did not enter					
(Ghana) 1978	Did not qualify								2	0	1	1	5	6
(Nigeria) 1980	Did not enter								Did not enter					
(Libya) 1982	Withdrew								Withdrew					
(Ivory Coast) 1984	Did not qualify								2	0	1	1	2	6
(Egypt) 1986	Did not qualify								2	0	1	1	1	3
(Morocco) 1988	Did not qualify								2	1	0	1	1	1
(Algeria) 1990	Did not qualify								6	3	0	3	6	6
(Senegal) 1992	Did not qualify								6	2	3	1	3	2
(Tunisia) 1994	Group stage	12th	2	0	0	2	0	7	6	4	2	0	10	2
(South Africa) 1996	Quarter-finals	7th	3	1	1	1	4	3	4	3	0	1	8	2
(Burkina Faso) 1998	Did not qualify								6	1	4	1	5	5
(Ghana) (Nigeria) 2000	Group stage	16th	3	0	1	2	2	6	8	5	1	2	15	10
(Mali) 2002	Did not qualify								8	3	3	2	13	10
(Tunisia) 2004	Did not qualify								6	2	0	4	7	7
(Egypt) 2006	Did not qualify								12	3	5	4	15	14
(Ghana) 2008	Did not qualify								4	2	1	1	6	5
(Angola) 2010	Group stage	10th	3	1	1	1	2	2	6	4	0	2	8	3
(Gabon) (Equatorial Guinea) 2012	Quarter-finals	5th	4	3	1	0	7	3	Qualified as hosts					
(South Africa) 2013	Did not qualify								2	0	1	1	2	3
(Equatorial Guinea) 2015	Group stage	12th	3	1	0	2	2	3	6	3	3	0	9	4
(Gabon) 2017	Group stage	9th	3	0	3	0	2	2	Qualified as host					
(Egypt) 2019	Did not qualify								6	2	2	2	7	5
(Cameroon) 2021	Round of 16	12th	4	1	3	0	5	4	6	3	1	2	8	6
(Ivory Coast) 2023	Did not qualify								6	2	1	3	3	5
(Morocco) 2025	Group stage	22nd	3	0	0	3	4	7	6	3	1	2	7	9
(Kenya) (Tanzania) (Uganda) 2027	To be determined								To be determined					
(African Union) 2028	To be determined								To be determined					
(African Union) 2032	To be determined								To be determined					
(African Union) 2036	To be determined								To be determined					
Total	Quarter-finals	9/35	28	7	10	11	28	37	116	43	30	43	135	108

=== African Nations Championship ===
- 2009 – Did not qualify
- 2011 – Group stage
- 2014 – Quarter-finals
- 2016 – Group stage
- 2018 – Withdrew
- 2020 – Banned
- 2022 – Did not enter

== Honours ==
=== Regional ===
- CEMAC Cup
  - (gold) Champions (1): 2013
  - (silver) Runners-up (1): 2007
  - (bronze) Third place (2): 2005, 2006
- UDEAC Cup
  - (gold) Champions (2): 1985, 1988
  - (bronze) Third place (2): 1987, 1989
- UNIFAC Cup
  - (gold) Champions (1): 1999
- Central African Games
  - (bronze) Bronze medal (2): 1976, 1981
