= Aamir Abdallah =

Sudanese footballer (born 1999)

Personal information
- Full name: Aamir Yunis Abdallah
- Date of birth: May 8, 1999 (age 27)
- Place of birth: Kassala, Sudan
- Height: 1.75 m (5 ft 9 in)
- Positions: Right winger; attacking midfielder

Team information
- Current team: Kazma SC
- Number: 24

Youth career
- North Lions
- Brunswick City
- Central Coast Mariners

Senior career*
Years	Team	Apps	(Gls)
2012	North Lions	0	(0)
2016–2017	Brunswick City	7	(0)
2019	Northcote City	21	(2)
2020	Heidelberg United	5	(0)
2021–2022	FCI Levadia Tallinn	4	(0)
2022	→ Pärnu JK Vaprus (loan)	15	(1)
2023	Lalor United Sloga FC	7	(4)
2023	Heidelberg United	9	(0)
2024	Hume City FC	28	(14)
2025	Green Gully SC	24	(10)
2025	Avondale FC	6	(1)
2026-	Kazma SC	1	(0)

International career^{‡}
2025–	Sudan	7	(1)
- * Club domestic league appearances and goals ‡ National team caps and goals as of 16 November 2026

Aamir Yunis Abdallah (Arabic: عامر يونس عبد الله; born 8 May 1999) is a Sudanese-born Australian footballer who plays as an attacker for Kazma SC in the Kuwait Premier League, and the Sudan national team.

== Early life ==
Amer Abdallah was born in Kassala, Sudan, to Eritrean parents and later moved to Melbourne, Australia, with his family. His passion for football started at an early age, playing street football daily during his childhood.

== Club career ==
Aamir Abdallah began his football journey with North Lions and Brunswick City. He played professionally in Estonia for FCI Levadia and Pärnu JK Vaprus in the Meistriliiga. In 2021, he was part of the Levadia squad that won the Estonian championship.

Upon returning to Australia, Abdallah joined Heidelberg United in 2023, then signed with Hume City FC in January 2024. He scored 14 goals and provided five assists in 20 matches during the 2024 NPL Victoria season, earning the Gold Medal, Players' Player Award, and the Bill Fleming Medal.

In the 2024 Australia Cup, Abdallah scored an Olimpico goal in the Round of 16 against Melbourne Srbija, securing a 1–0 win.

In January 2025, he signed with Green Gully SC. In Round 13 of the 2025 NPL Victoria season, Abdallah scored a hat-trick in a 5–2 win over Avondale FC.

In September 2025, Abdallah signed for Avondale for the inaugural Australian Championship season.

In February 2026, Abdallah signed for Kazma SC in the Kuwait Premier League. On 7th February, Abdallah made his debut for Kazma, starting and providing an assist in a 1-0 away win over Al-Arabi SC.

== International career ==
Abdallah was called up to the Sudan national team for a set of friendlies in March 2025.

Abdallah was selected for Sudan's 2025 Africa Cup of Nations in December 2025. He started three of Sudan’s four matches in the tournament, scoring the opening goal in a 3-1 loss to Senegal in the Round of 16.

As of match played 3 January 2026

Appearances and goals by national team and year
National team	Year	Apps	Goals
Sudan	2025	2	0
Sudan	2026	1	1
Total		3	1

List of international goals scored by Aamir Abdallah
No.	Date	Venue	Opponent	Score	Result	Competition
1	3 January 2026	Tangier Grand Stadium, Tangier, Morocco	Senegal	1–0	1–3	2025 Africa Cup of Nations

== Playing Style ==
Abdallah is known for his pace, dribbling, and accurate crosses. He is versatile across both wings and as an attacking midfielder.

== Honours ==
- NPL Victoria Gold Medal: 2024
- NPLM Players' Player Award: 2024
- Bill Fleming Medal: 2024
- Meistriliiga Champion: 2021 (with FCI Levadia)
