= Thierry Mouyouma =

Gabonese footballer and manager (born 1975)

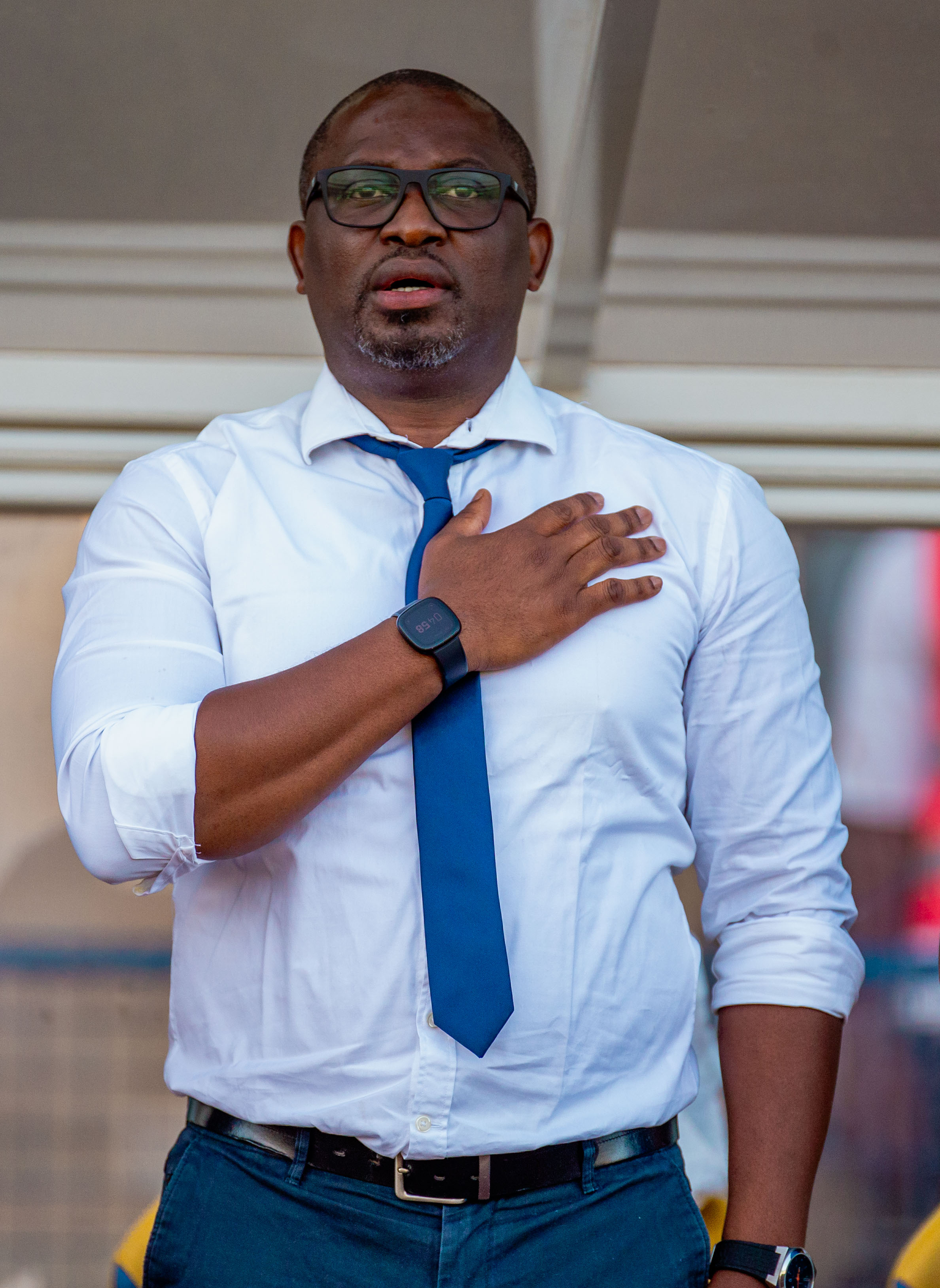

Personal information
- Full name: Thierry Dieudonné Mouyouma
- Date of birth: 27 September 1975 (age 51)
- Place of birth: Gabon
- Position: Defender

Senior career*
Years	Team	Apps	(Gls)
2000–2002	Leixões		
2002–2003	Felgueiras		
2003–2005	Wits University	29	(0)
2005–2006	Ajax Cape Town		
2006	FC 105 Libreville		
2007	Busaiteen Club		

International career
1995–2006	Gabon	32	(0)

Managerial career
- FC 105 Libreville
- 2023–2026: Gabon
- * Club domestic league appearances and goals as of 1 May 2007

Thierry Mouyouma (born 27 September 1975) is a Gabonese professional football manager and former player who played as a defender. He was most recently the manager of the Gabon national team.

== Career ==
He spent his early career with MangaSport, FC 105 Libreville, Étoile du Sahel, CO Medenine, Stade Reims, Canon Yaoundé, Leixões SC and FC Felgueiras.

In 2003, Mouyouma moved to South Africa, joining Wits University from FC Felgueiras.

After he retired from playing, Mouyouma became a football coach. He manages his former club, FC 105 Libreville.

=== Managerial record ===
As of match played 1 January 2026

Managerial record by team and tenure
Team	Nat	From	To	Record					Ref.
Team	Nat	From	To	G	W	D	L	Win %	Ref.
Gabon		2023	1 January 2026	33	15	6	12	45.45	
Career Total				33	15	6	12	45.45	—
