= Karl Etta Eyong =

Cameroonian footballer

Personal information
- Full name: Karl Edouard Blaise Etta Eyong
- Date of birth: 14 October 2003 (age 23)
- Place of birth: Douala, Cameroon
- Height: 1.81 m (5 ft 11 in)
- Position: Forward

Team information
- Current team: Levante
- Number: 21

Youth career
- Galactique
- 2022: Cádiz

Senior career*
Years	Team	Apps	(Gls)
2022	Fundación Cádiz	4	(0)
2022–2024	Cádiz B	46	(14)
2024	Cádiz	2	(0)
2024–2025	Villarreal B	30	(19)
2025	Villarreal	7	(2)
2025–	Levante	33	(6)

International career^{‡}
2023	Cameroon U23	2	(0)
2025–	Cameroon	8	(2)
- * Club domestic league appearances and goals as of 29 August 2026 ‡ National team caps and goals as of 31 March 2026

Karl Edouard Blaise Etta Eyong (born 14 October 2003) is a Cameroonian professional footballer who plays as forward for La Liga club Levante and the Cameroon national team.

== Club career ==
=== Early career ===
Born in Douala, Etta Eyong began his career with local side Galactique before joining the youth sides of Cádiz in January 2022. Upon arriving, he featured for the Juvenil squad before making his senior debut with the Fundación Cádiz squad in the Tercera Andaluza.

=== Cádiz ===
Promoted to the reserves ahead of the 2022–23 season, Etta Eyong was mainly a backup option before being converted to a forward in the 2023–24 campaign and starting to score on a regular basis. He made his first team – and La Liga – debut on 19 January 2024, coming on as a second-half substitute for Sergi Guardiola in a 1–0 away loss against Alavés.

=== Villarreal ===
On 29 August 2024, Etta Eyong signed a three-year contract with another reserve team, Villarreal B in Primera Federación. On 20 April 2025, he made his La Liga debut with the first team in a 2–2 draw against Real Sociedad. A few weeks later, on 10 May, he netted his maiden goal in a 1–0 away win over Girona.

=== Levante ===
On 1 September 2025, Etta Eyong joined fellow top tier side Levante on a four-year deal. Later that month, on 14 September, he netted a goal on his debut in a 2–2 draw with Real Betis.

== International career ==
In March 2023, Etta Eyong was called up to the Cameroon national under-23 team. He featured in both legs against Gabon U23 during the 2023 Africa Cup of Nations qualification, with the tie ending in a penalty shoot-out defeat.

On 8 October 2025, he made his senior international debut for Cameroon in a 2–0 away victory over Mauritius during the 2026 FIFA World Cup qualification. Later that year, on 24 December, he scored his first goal in a 1–0 victory over Gabon during the Africa Cup of Nations.

== Career statistics ==
=== Club ===
As of match played 17 May 2026

Appearances and goals by club, season and competition
Club	Season	League			National cup		Europe		Other		Total	
Club	Season	Division	Apps	Goals	Apps	Goals	Apps	Goals	Apps	Goals	Apps	Goals
Fundación Cádiz	2021–22	Tercera Andaluza	4	0	—		—		2 (Note: Appearances in Tercera Andaluza promotion play-offs)	1	6	1
Cádiz B	2022–23	Segunda Federación	14	0	—		—		—		14	0
Cádiz B	2023–24	Segunda Federación	32	14	—		—		—		32	14
Cádiz B	Total		46	14	—		—		—		46	14
Cádiz	2023–24	La Liga	1	0	0	0	—		—		1	0
Cádiz	2024–25	Segunda División	1	0	0	0	—		—		1	0
Cádiz	Total		2	0	0	0	—		—		2	0
Villarreal B	2024–25	Primera Federación	30	19	—		—		—		30	19
Villarreal	2024–25	La Liga	4	1	0	0	—		—		4	1
Villarreal	2025–26	La Liga	3	1	—		—		—		3	1
Villarreal	Total		7	2	0	0	—		—		7	2
Levante	2025–26	La Liga	29	6	1	0	—		—		30	6
Career total			118	41	1	0	0	0	2	1	120	42

=== International ===
As of match played 31 March 2026

Appearances and goals by national team and year
National team	Year	Apps	Goals
Cameroon	2025	6	1
Cameroon	2026	2	1
Total		8	2

Scores and results list Cameroon's goal tally first.

List of international goals scored by Karl Etta Eyong
No.	Date	Venue	Opponent	Score	Result	Competition
1	24 December 2025	Adrar Stadium, Agadir, Morocco	Gabon	1–0	1–0	2025 Africa Cup of Nations
2	31 March 2026	Melbourne Rectangular Stadium, Melbourne, Australia	China	1–0	2–0	2026 FIFA Series
