= Samaké Nzé Bagnama =

Gabonese footballer (born 2002)

Personal information
- Date of birth: 28 June 2002 (age 24)
- Place of birth: Libreville, Gabon
- Height: 1.73 m (5 ft 8 in)
- Position: Defensive midfielder

Team information
- Current team: Stade d'Abidjan

Senior career*
Years	Team	Apps	(Gls)
–2025	CF Mounana		
2025–	Stade d'Abidjan		

International career^{‡}
2023	Gabon U23	2	(0)
2025–	Gabon	10	(0)
- * Club domestic league appearances and goals ‡ National team caps and goals as of 22:02, 30 March 2026 (UTC)

Samaké Nzé Bagnama (born 28 June 2002) is a Gabonese professional footballer who plays as a defensive midfielder for Ivorian Ligue 1 club Stade d'Abidjan and the Gabon national team.

== Club career ==
In August 2025, Nzé Bagnama left CF Mounana and signed for Ivorian champions Stade d'Abidjan on a two-year contract.

== International career ==
Nzé Bagnama is a former under-23 international for Gabon. He was called up to the senior Gabon national team for the first time in 2025. In December 2025, he was selected for the 2025 Africa Cup of Nations.

== Career statistics ==
=== International ===
As of match played 30 March 2026

Appearances and goals by national team and year
National team	Year	Apps	Goals
Gabon	2025	8	0
Gabon	2026	2	0
Total		10	0
