= Teddy Averlant =

Gabonese footballer (born 1999)

Personal information
- Full name: Teddy Andami Averlant
- Date of birth: 2 October 1999 (age 27)
- Place of birth: Saint-Quentin, France
- Height: 1.80 m (5 ft 11 in)
- Position: Winger

Team information
- Current team: Guingamp
- Number: 11

Youth career
- 2010–2013: Gauchy Grugies St-Quentin FC
- 2013–2015: Olympique Saint-Quentin
- 2015–2016: Entente Feignies Aulnoye FC
- 2016–2017: Olympique Saint-Quentin

Senior career*
Years	Team	Apps	(Gls)
2017–2018	Olympique Saint-Quentin	2	(0)
2018–2019	E. Itancourt-Neuville		
2019–2020	Sedan II	0	(0)
2020–2023	Olympique Saint-Quentin	59	(11)
2023–2024	Furiani-Agliani	25	(4)
2024–2025	Boulogne	32	(4)
2025–2026	Amiens	32	(5)
2026–	Guingamp	7	(0)

International career^{‡}
2025–	Gabon	9	(1)
- * Club domestic league appearances and goals as of 19 September 2026 ‡ National team caps and goals as of 29 September 2026

Teddy Andami Averlant (born 2 October 1999) is a professional football player who plays as a winger for Ligue 2 club Guingamp. Born in France, he plays for the Gabon national team.

== Club career ==
Averlant is a product of the youth academies of Gauchy Grugies St-Quentin FC, Olympique Saint-Quentin and Entente Feignies Aulnoye FC. He began his senior career with his local club Olympique Saint-Quentin in 2017, and followed that up with stints at E. Itancourt-Neuville and Sedan II from 2018 to 2020. In 2020, he returned to Olympique Saint-Quentin where he stayed for 3 seasons. In 2023, he transferred to Furiani-Agliani. On 1 July 2024, he moved to Boulogne in the Championnat National. On 1 June 2025, he transferred to Amiens in the Ligue 2 on a 3-year contract.

On 25 June 2026, Averlant signed a three-season contract with Guingamp in Ligue 2.

== International career ==
Born in France, Averlant is of Gabonese descent through his father. He was called up to the Gabon national team for a set of friendlies in June 2025. He debuted with Gabon in a 2–0 friendly win over Guinea-Bissau on 9 June 2025.

== Personal life ==
Through his mother, Averlant is related to the French boxer Tony Averlant.

== Career statistics ==
=== Club ===
As of match played 19 September 2026

Appearances and goals by club, season and competition
Club	Season	League			Cup		Other		Total	
Club	Season	Division	Apps	Goals	Apps	Goals	Apps	Goals	Apps	Goals
Olympique Saint-Quentin	2017–18	CFA 2	2	0	—		—		2	0
E. Itancourt-Neuville	2018–19	—			—		—		0	0
Sedan II	2019–20	Ligue 3	0	0	—		—		0	0
Olympique Saint-Quentin	2020–21	CFA	5	0	0	0	—		5	0
Olympique Saint-Quentin	2021–22	CFA	26	7	3	0	—		29	7
Olympique Saint-Quentin	2022–23	CFA	28	5	3	0	—		31	5
Olympique Saint-Quentin	Total		53	12	6	0	—		59	12
Furiani-Agliani	2023–24	CFA	25	4	3	1	—		28	5
Boulogne	2024–25	Ligue 3	32	4	4	2	2 (Note: Appearances in Ligue 1 relegation/promotion play-offs)	1	38	7
Amiens	2025–26	Ligue 2	32	5	3	1	—		35	6
Guingamp	2026–27	Ligue 2	7	0	0	0	—		7	0
Career total			157	25	16	4	2	1	175	30

=== International ===
As of match played 29 September 2026

Appearances and goals by national team and year
National team	Year	Apps	Goals
Gabon	2025	6	0
Gabon	2026	3	1
Total		9	1

=== International goals ===
No.	Date	Venue	Opponent	Score	Result	Competition
1	27 March 2026	Bunyodkor Stadium, Tashkent, Uzbekistan	Uzbekistan	1–0	1–3	2026 FIFA Series
