= Faisal Bangal =

Mozambican footballer

Personal information
- Date of birth: 5 January 1995 (age 31)
- Place of birth: Chimoio, Mozambique
- Height: 1.81 m (5 ft 11 in)
- Position: Forward

Team information
- Current team: Mestre
- Number: 9

Youth career
- 2006–2014: Atalanta Primavera

Senior career*
Years	Team	Apps	(Gls)
2014–2017	Atalanta	0	(0)
2014–2015	→ Ascoli (loan)	6	(0)
2014–2014	→ San Marino (loan)	6	(0)
2015–2016	→ Tuttocuoio (loan)	10	(0)
2016–2017	→ KF Teuta (loan)	27	(4)
2018–2021	Scanzorosciate	49	(5)
2021	Caravaggio	17	(6)
2021–2023	Alcione	72	(23)
2023–2024	Luparense	9	(6)
2024–	Mestre	0	(0)

International career^{‡}
2014–	Mozambique	15	(4)
- * Club domestic league appearances and goals as of 10 November 2024 ‡ National team caps and goals as of 28 December 2025

Faisal Bangal (born 5 January 1996) is a Mozambican professional footballer who plays as a forward for Serie D club Mestre.

== Club career ==
In 2006, Bangal joined the Atalanta youth system. In 2014, he signed a contract with Atalanta until 2017.

On 1 August 2014, he was loaned to Lega Pro club Ascoli for six months. He made his professional league debut against Pistoiese on 31 August 2014. He returned to Atalanta on 31 December 2014, but he was immediately loaned to San Marino in Lega Pro until end of season. On 31 August 2015, he was loaned to Tuttocuoio in Lega Pro.

== International career ==
On 5 March 2014, Bangal made his Mozambique national team debut against Angola national football team in Maputo.

== Career statistics ==
=== Club ===
As of 1 July 2017

Appearances and goals by club, season and competition
Club	Season	League			National cup (Note: Includes Coppa Italia, Albanian Cup.)		Continental		Total	
Club	Season	Division	Apps	Goals	Apps	Goals	Apps	Goals	Apps	Goals
Ascoli	2014–15	Lega Pro	5	0	0	0	—		5	0
San Marino	2014–15	Lega Pro	6	0	0	0	—		6	0
Tuttocuoio	2015–16	Lega Pro	9	0	0	0	—		9	0
Teuta	2016–17	Albanian Superliga	27	4	4	0	0	0	31	4
Career total			47	4	4	0	0	0	51	4

=== International ===
Appearances and goals by national team and year
National team	Year	Apps	Goals
Mozambique
Mozambique	2014	1	0
Mozambique	2016	1	0
Mozambique	2021	2	0
Mozambique	2023	4	2
Mozambique	2025	7	2
Total		15	4

Scores and results list Mozambique's goal tally first.

No.	Date	Venue	Opponent	Score	Result	Competition
1.	13 October 2023	Estádio Municipal de Albufeira, Albufeira, Portugal	Mozambique	1–0	1–1	Friendly
2.	16 October 2023	Estádio Municipal de Albufeira, Albufeira, Portugal	Nigeria	2–3	2–3	Friendly
2.	8 September 2025	Estádio do Zimpeto, Maputo, Mozambique	Botswana	2–0	2–0	2026 FIFA World Cup qualification
3.	28 December 2025	Adrar Stadium, Agadir, Morocco	Gabon	1–0	3–2	2025 Africa Cup of Nations
