= Loyce Mbaba =

Gabonese footballer (born 1998)

Personal information
- Full name: Loyce Marius Mbaba
- Date of birth: 4 May 1998 (age 28)
- Place of birth: Gabon
- Position: Goalkeeper

Team information
- Current team: Stella Club d'Adjamé
- Number: 23

Senior career*
Years	Team	Apps	(Gls)
2018–2024	AS Mangasport		
2024	→ Bouaké FC (loan)		
2024–	Stella Club d'Adjamé		

International career^{‡}
2023–	Gabon	16	(0)
- * Club domestic league appearances and goals ‡ National team caps and goals as of 28 December 2025

Loyce Marius Mbaba (born 4 May 1998) is a Gabonese professional footballer who plays as a goalkeeper for Ligue 1 Lonaci club Stella Club d'Adjamé and the Gabon national football team.

== Club career ==
Mbaba started his career at Gabon Championnat National D1 club AS MangaSport in 2018. In 2022, Mbaba was nominated for the Gabonese Best Goalkeeper Award. The award was then given to Ruud Tsoumbou - a goalkeeper for AS Stade Mandji club. In 2024, he was loaned to Ligue 1 Lonaci side Bouake FC for 6 months. In 2024, Mbaba was sought after by several Ivorian clubs after his previous loan, he signed with Stella Club d'Adjamé in Ligue 1 Lonaci for two seasons.

== International career ==
In 2023, Mbaba was called up to Gabon's squad for the World Cup 2026 Qualification. At that time, Mbaba was the only player who played for the Gabonese league in the list of call-ups. On 6 August 2024, he made his international debut in a World Cup Qualifier match against Côte d'Ivoire, lost 0-1.

== Career statistics ==
=== International ===
As of match played 28 December 2025

Appearances and goals by national team and year
National team	Year	Apps	Goals
Gabon	2024	7	0
Gabon	2025	9	0
Total		16	0

== Achievements ==
=== AS MangaSport ===
- Championnat D1
  - Champion: 2017-18
  - Runner-up: 2022
