= Diogo Calila =

Mozambican footballer

Personal information
- Full name: Diogo dos Santos Cabral
- Date of birth: 10 October 1998 (age 28)
- Place of birth: Seixal, Portugal
- Height: 1.80 m (5 ft 11 in)
- Position: Right-back

Team information
- Current team: Maghreb Fez

Youth career
- 2008–2009: Belenenses
- 2009–2017: Benfica
- 2017–2018: Paços Ferreira
- 2018–2019: Belenenses

Senior career*
Years	Team	Apps	(Gls)
2019–2022	B-SAD	64	(0)
2020	B-SAD B	1	(0)
2022–2026	Santa Clara	91	(4)
2026–	Maghreb Fez		

International career^{‡}
2025–	Mozambique	8	(1)
- * Club domestic league appearances and goals as of 17:29, 29 August 2026 (UTC) ‡ National team caps and goals as of 13:03, 6 January 2026 (UTC)

Diogo dos Santos Cabral (born 10 October 1998), known as Diogo Calila, is a professional footballer who plays as a right-back for Botola Pro club Maghreb Fez the Mozambique national team.

== Club career ==
=== Belenenses ===
Calila was born in Seixal, Lisbon metropolitan area. A youth product of S.L. Benfica, he was promoted to the senior team of B-SAD in January 2019. He made his Primeira Liga debut later that month, coming on as a 74th-minute substitute for Diogo Viana in a 3–0 away loss against FC Porto.

Calila played 20 matches – 23 in all competitions – in the 2020–21 season, helping his team finish tenth in the table. He subsequently renewed his contract until 2024.

On 27 November 2021, Calila was the only player available from the main squad to face Benfica, due to a bout of COVID-19. Nine players started the game, most of them from the under-23 side and two being goalkeepers; after seven returned for the second half with the score at 7–0 and one suffered an injury, the fixture was abandoned.

=== Santa Clara ===
In August 2022, Calila signed a three-year contract with C.D. Santa Clara with the option of a further two; his former club retained 20% of the player's rights. He contributed 18 appearances and two goals in the 2023–24 campaign, in a top-division return one year after relegation.

Calila scored his first goal in the top flight on 25 October 2024, in a 2–1 home win over Gil Vicente FC. He made 102 total appearances during his spell, netting five times and providing six assists.

=== Maghreb Fez ===
In September 2026, Calila moved to the Moroccan Botola Pro on a deal at Maghreb Fez.

== International career ==
In August 2025, Calila was pre-called up to the Mozambique national team. He earned his first cap on 5 September, featuring the entire 4–0 loss away to Uganda in the 2026 FIFA World Cup qualifiers. In December, he was selected by manager Chiquinho Conde for the 2025 Africa Cup of Nations finals in Morocco. In their second group game, against Gabon, he scored his first goal to contribute decisively to a 3–2 victory in Agadir, the country's first ever in the tournament.

== Personal life ==
Calila's father, Carlos (who shared the same nickname), was also a footballer. A forward, he played mostly for C.F. Os Belenenses.

== Career statistics ==
=== Club ===
As of match played 29 August 2026

Appearances and goals by club, season and competition
Club	Season	League			Cup		League cup		Other		Total	
Club	Season	Division	Apps	Goals	Apps	Goals	Apps	Goals	Apps	Goals	Apps	Goals
B-SAD	2018–19	Primeira Liga	4	0	0	0	—		—		4	0
B-SAD	2019–20	Primeira Liga	12	0	1	0	—		—		13	0
B-SAD	2020–21	Primeira Liga	20	0	3	0	—		—		23	0
B-SAD	2021–22	Primeira Liga	26	0	2	1	1	0	—		29	1
B-SAD	2022–23	Primeira Liga	2	0	—		—		—		2	0
B-SAD	Total		64	0	6	1	1	0	—		71	1
Santa Clara	2022–23	Primeira Liga	15	0	0	0	2	0	—		17	0
Santa Clara	2023–24	Liga Portugal 2	18	2	4	0	0	0	—		22	2
Santa Clara	2024–25	Primeira Liga	31	1	1	0	0	0	—		32	1
Santa Clara	2025–26	Primeira Liga	23	1	1	1	1	0	2 (Note: Appearances in UEFA Conference League)	0	27	2
Santa Clara	2026–27	Primeira Liga	4	0	0	0	0	0	—		4	0
Santa Clara	Total		91	4	6	1	3	0	2	0	102	5
Career total			155	4	12	2	4	0	2	0	173	6

=== International ===
As of match played 5 January 2026

Appearances and goals by national team and year
National team	Year	Apps	Goals
Mozambique	2025	8	1
Total		8	1

Scores and results list Mozambique's goal tally first.

List of international goals scored by Diogo Calila
No.	Date	Venue	Opponent	Score	Result	Competition
1.	28 December 2025	Adrar Stadium, Agadir, Morocco	Gabon	3–1	3–2	2025 Africa Cup of Nations

== Honours ==
Santa Clara

- Liga Portugal 2: 2023–24
