= Samuel Kotto =

Cameroonian footballer

Personal information
- Full name: Samuel Junior Kotto
- Date of birth: 3 September 2003 (age 23)
- Place of birth: Cameroon
- Height: 1.90 m (6 ft 3 in)
- Position: Centre-back

Team information
- Current team: Reims
- Number: 22

Youth career
- APEJES Academy

Senior career*
Years	Team	Apps	(Gls)
2022–2024	Malmö FF	1	(0)
2022	→ Olympic (loan)	24	(1)
2023	→ Landskrona BoIS (loan)	14	(0)
2024	→ Värnamo (loan)	17	(1)
2025–2026	Gent	20	(0)
2026	→ Reims (loan)	15	(0)
2026–	Reims	7	(1)

International career^{‡}
2021–	Cameroon U20	1	(0)
2025–	Cameroon	8	(0)
- * Club domestic league appearances and goals as of 19 September 2026 ‡ National team caps and goals as of 29 September 2026

Samuel Junior Kotto (born 3 September 2003) is a Cameroonian professional footballer who plays as a centre-back for Ligue 2 club Reims and the Cameroon national team.

== Club career ==
After a successful trial with Malmö FF in 2021, Kotto signed a contract with the club on 9 March 2022. A month later, it was announced that Kotto would spend the next four months on loan at BK Olympic. Kotto played out the 2022 season with Olympic and returned to Malmö FF for the 2023 season, where he made his professional debut against Varbergs BoIS on 4 May 2023 when he entered as a substitute for Taha Ali in the 81st minute.

On 20 January 2025, Kotto signed a three-and-a-half-year contract with Gent in Belgium.

On 20 January 2026, Kotto was loaned to Ligue 2 club Reims until the end of the season.

== Career statistics ==
=== Club ===
As of 19 September 2026.

Club	Season	Division	League		Cup		Continental		Other		Total	
Club	Season	Division	Apps	Goals	Apps	Goals	Apps	Goals	Apps	Goals	Apps	Goals
Olympic (loan)	2022	Ettan Södra	24	1	0	0	—		—		24	1
Malmö FF	2023	Allsvenskan	1	0	0	0	—		—		1	0
Landskrona (loan)	2023	Superettan	14	0	1	0	—		—		15	0
Värnamo (loan)	2024	Allsvenskan	17	1	4	0	—		2 (Note: Appearances in Relegation play-off)	0	23	1
Gent	2024–25	Belgian Pro League	10	0	—		0	0	—		10	0
Gent	2025–26	Belgian Pro League	8	0	2	0	—		—		10	0
Gent	Total		18	0	2	0	0	0	0	0	20	0
Reims (loan)	2025–26	Ligue 2	15	0	1	0	—		—		16	0
Reims	2026–27	Ligue 2	7	1	0	0	—		—		7	1
Career total			96	3	8	0	0	0	2	0	106	3

=== International ===
As of match played 29 September 2026

Appearances and goals by national team and year
National team	Year	Apps	Goals
Cameroon	2023	1	0
Cameroon	2025	2	0
Cameroon	2026	5	0
Total		8	0

== Honours ==
Malmö FF

- Allsvenskan: 2023
