= Manuel Kambala =

Mozambican footballer

Personal information
- Full name: Manuel Nhanga Kambala
- Date of birth: 21 August 1991 (age 35)
- Place of birth: Quelimane, Mozambique
- Height: 1.82 m (6 ft 0 in)
- Position: Midfielder

Team information
- Current team: Polokwane City
- Number: 21

Senior career*
Years	Team	Apps	(Gls)
2010	1º de Maio de Quelimane		
2011	GDR Vila Pita		
2012–2015	HCB Songo		
2016–2019	UD Songo		
2019–2022	Baroka	65	(3)
2022–2023	Magesi	11	(1)
2023–	Polokwane City	60	(0)

International career^{‡}
2017–	Mozambique	34	(0)
- * Club domestic league appearances and goals as of 26 December 2025 ‡ National team caps and goals as of 4 May 2023

Manuel Nhanga Kambala (born 21 August 1991) is a Mozambican footballer who plays as a midfielder for Polokwane City. South African football fans nicknamed him "THE LORD KAMBALA" for what he did in 2019/20 season in PSL, scoring an equalising goal in the last game of the season against Kaizer Chiefs, denying them the league.
