= Ernan Siluane =

Mozambican footballer

Personal information
- Birth name: Ernan Alberto Siluane
- Date of birth: September 7, 1998 (age 28)
- Place of birth: Maputo, Mozambique
- Height: 1.86 m (6 ft 1 in)
- Position: Goalkeeper

Team information
- Current team: Black Bulls
- Number: 1

Senior career*
Years	Team	Apps	(Gls)
2018–2022	Ferroviário Maputo		
2022–2023	Songo		
2023–	Black Bulls		

International career
2021–	Mozambique	27	(0)
- * Club domestic league appearances and goals

Ernan Alberto Siluane (born 7 September 1998), sometimes known as Ernani, is a Mozambican professional footballer who plays as a goalkeeper for Black Bulls and the Mozambique national team.

== Career ==
Siluane began his senior career with Ferroviário Maputo in the Moçambola in 2018. On 2022, he transferred to Songo and helped them win the 2022 Moçambola, but was out injured for an extended period after being attacked while on a walk. On 1 December 2023, he transferred to Black Bulls.

== International ==
Siluane debuted with the senior Mozambique national team in a 5–0 friendly win over Lesotho on 2 June 2021. He was part of the Mozambique squad for the 2022 African Nations Championship. He was called up to the national team for the 2023 Africa Cup of Nations.

== Honours ==
Songo

- Moçambola: 2022
