= David Pagou =

Cameroonian football coach

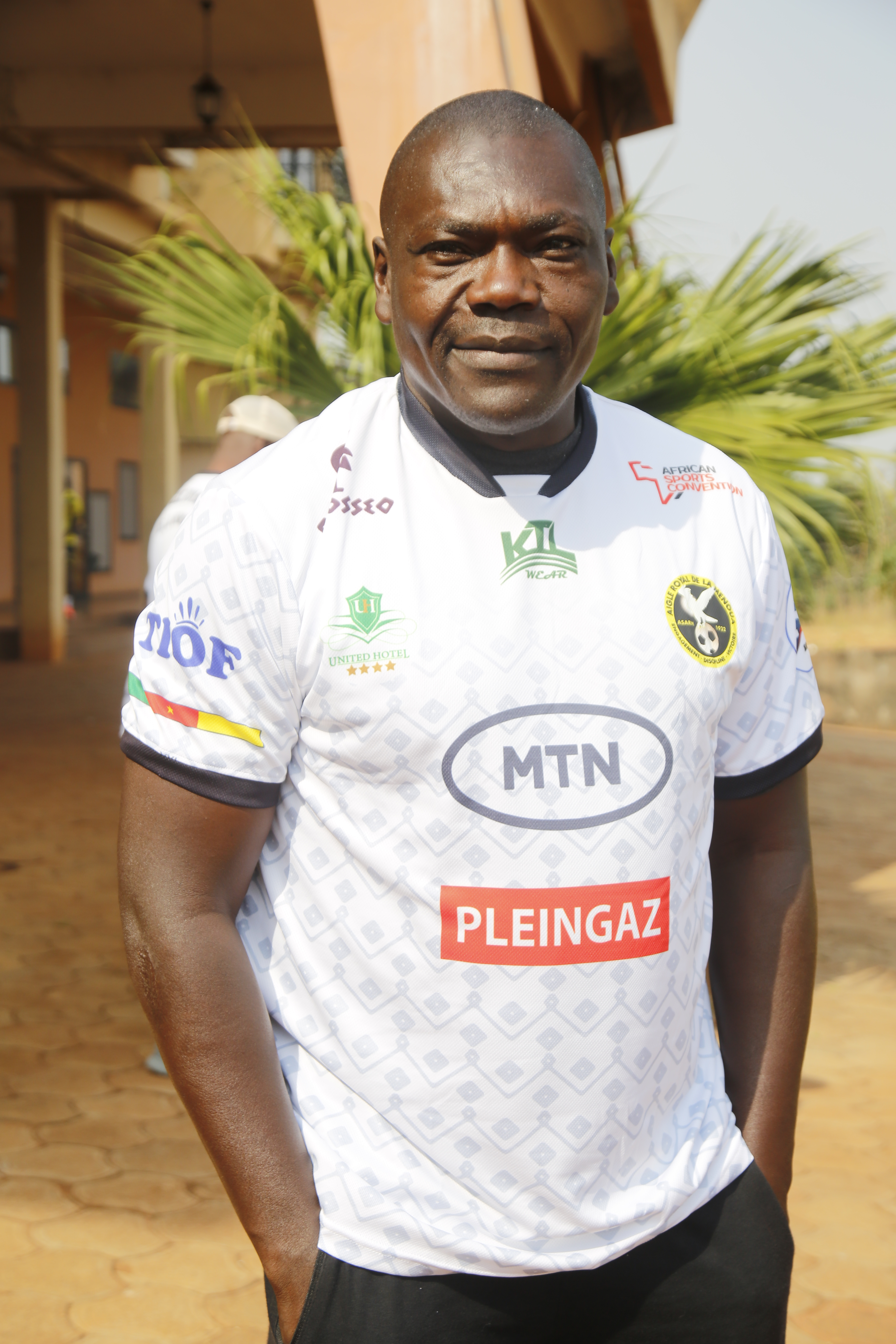
- Pagou in 2022

Personal information
- Date of birth: 13 January 1969 (age 57)
- Place of birth: Kaélé, Cameroon

Team information
- Current team: Cameroon (manager); Coton Sport (manager)

Managerial career
- Years: Team
- APEJES de Mfou
- –2014: Cosmos de Bafia
- 2015: Canon Yaoundé
- 2016: APEJES de Mfou
- 2016–2018: Renaissance
- 2018–2019: Eding Sport (assistant)
- 2019–2022: PWD Bamenda
- 2022–2023: Aigle Royal Menoua
- 2023–2024: Stade Renard
- 2024–2025: Cameroon (assistant)
- 2024–2025: PWD Bamenda
- 2025–: Coton Sport
- 2025–: Cameroon

David Pagou (born 13 January 1969) is a Cameroonian football coach, currently the manager of the Cameroon national team.

== Career ==
Born in Kaélé, Pagou began his coaching career in the 1990s. After managing APEJES de Mfou and Cosmos de Bafia, he began the 2015 season in charge of Canon Yaoundé, but left after eight winless matches, and subsequently led the University of Yaoundé I to the gold medal in that year's University Games.

Back to APEJES in 2016, Pagou subsequently enjoyed a long spell at Renaissance. In 2019, after being an assistant of Jean-Baptiste Bisseck at Eding Sport, he was appointed manager of PWD Bamenda.

Pagou led PWD to the 2019–20 Elite One title, the first of their history, and renewed his contract for a further year on 10 October 2021. He also won the 2021 Cameroonian Cup, before departing the club on 25 July 2022.

On 14 December 2022, Pagou was named manager of Aigle Royal Menoua. He resigned the following 12 July, and subsequently took over Stade Renard, where he was named as the best manager of 2024.

In April 2024, Pagou was appointed an assistant of the Cameroon national team. He returned to PWD Bamenda on 14 August, but was unable to repeat the same success as the club only avoided relegation.

On 24 September 2025, Pagou was announced as the new manager of Coton Sport. On 1 December of that year, he replaced Marc Brys as the head coach of the full national team.

== Honours ==
PWD Bamenda

- Elite One: 2019–20
- Cameroonian Cup: 2021

Individual

- Cameroon Best Manager of the Year: 2024
