= Nanani =

Mozambican footballer

Personal information
- Full name: Infren da Conceição David Matola
- Date of birth: 8 February 1996 (age 30)
- Place of birth: Matola, Mozambique
- Height: 1.70 m (5 ft 7 in)
- Position: Right-back

Team information
- Current team: Liga Desportiva de Maputo

Senior career*
Years	Team	Apps	(Gls)
2016–2017	GD Maputo		
2017–	Liga Desportiva de Maputo		
2019	→ UD Songo (loan)	27	(1)

International career^{‡}
2018–	Mozambique	10	(0)
- * Club domestic league appearances and goals as of 22 July 2020 ‡ National team caps and goals as of 22 July 2020

Infren da Conceição David Matola (born 8 February 1996), known as Nanani, is a Mozambican footballer who plays as a defender for Liga Desportiva de Maputo and the Mozambique national football team.

== Career ==
=== International ===
Nanani made his senior international debut on 29 May 2018, playing the entirety of a 3–0 victory over Comoros at the 2018 COSAFA Cup.

== Career statistics ==
=== International ===
As of matches played 13 October 2019.

National team	Year	Apps	Goals
Mozambique	2018	3	0
Mozambique	2019	7	0
Total		10	0
