= Abongile Tom =

South African referee

- Born: 16 December 1991 (age 34); Cape Town, South Africa

Domestic
Years	League	Role

International
Years	League	Role

Abongile Tom (born 16 December 1991) is a South African international football referee who has been listed as an international referee for FIFA since 2020.

== Refereeing ==
In 2022, he was selected to officiate at the 2022 African Nations Championship.

In 2023, he was one of two South African referee's granted professional contracts by CAF. He also officiated at the 2023 FIFA U-20 World Cup and the 2023 African Football League.

In 2024, he was selected to officiate at the 2025 Africa Cup of Nations.

In 2026, he was selected to officiate at the 2026 FIFA World Cup in the US, Mexico and Canada.
