= Arthur Avom =

Cameroonian footballer (born 2004)

Personal information
- Full name: Arthur Avom Ebong
- Date of birth: 15 December 2004 (age 21)
- Place of birth: Yaoundé, Cameroon
- Height: 1.85 m (6 ft 1 in)
- Position: Midfielder

Team information
- Current team: Lorient
- Number: 62

Senior career*
Years	Team	Apps	(Gls)
2022–2023	Fauve Azur		
2023–2024	Lorient B	18	(0)
2024–	Lorient	72	(4)

International career^{‡}
2023–	Cameroon	18	(1)
- * Club domestic league appearances and goals as of 20:08, 15 November 2026 (UTC) ‡ National team caps and goals as of 15 November 2026

Arthur Avom Ebong (born 15 December 2004) is a Cameroonian professional footballer who plays as a midfielder for Ligue 1 club Lorient and the Cameroon national team.

== Club career ==
Avom began his senior career at Cameroonian club Fauve Azur, based in the capital Yaoundé, playing 72 games for the club. There he would be spotted by Lorient in France, with whom he signed a three-year deal with in 2023. He would make his debut for the club in September of that year, coming on as a substitute for the reserve team in a 4–2 Championnat National 2 victory over Borgo. He would go on to make 18 appearances for the Lorient II team that season as the team was relegated.

The first team was relegated that same season and Avom became a regular fixture in the side for the 2024–25 season, scoring his first goal for the club and his first in European football in a 2–1 away win over Red Star in February 2025. Lorient were re-promoted to Ligue 1 that season at the first time of asking, with Avom making 32 league appearances, registering 2 goals and 6 assists from central midfield. His performances that season drew attention from a host of Premier League clubs, such as Chelsea, Aston Villa and West Ham United.

In te 2025-26 season, Avom helped Lorient to finish 10th in his first season in the top-flight, registering 2 goals in 31 Ligue 1 appearances, with the club exercising the option to extend his contract and keep him at the club until June 2027 at the end of the season.

== International career ==
Avom made his first two appearances for the senior team in the 2022 African Nations Championship, a competition for players from the nations own domestic league, starting in a 1–0 win over Congo, and a 1–0 loss against Niger. He made these appearances while he was at Fauve Azur. He was called up to the senior team in 2024 for World Cup qualifying, but made no appearances.

He scored his first Cameroon goal in a 3-0 away win over Eswatini in September 2025 during the 2026 World Cup qualifying cycle, with Cameroon eventually failing to qualify.

== Career statistics ==
=== Club ===
As of 15 November 2026

Appearances and goals by club, season and competition
Club	Season	League			Cup		Other		Total	
Club	Season	Division	Apps	Goals	Apps	Goals	Apps	Goals	Apps	Goals
Lorient B	2023–24	National 2	18	0	—		—		18	0
Lorient	2024–25	Ligue 2	32	2	2	0	—		34	2
Lorient	2025–26	Ligue 1	30	2	2	0	—		32	3
Lorient	2026–27	Ligue 1	5	0	0	0	—		5	0
Lorient	Total		72	4	4	0	—		76	4
Career total			90	4	4	0	0	0	94	4

=== International ===
As of match played 12 Novemeber 2026

Appearances and goals by national team and year
National team	Year	Apps	Goals
Cameroon	2023	2	0
Cameroon	2025	8	1
Cameroon	2026	8	0
Total		18	1

==== International goals ====
List of international goals scored by Arthur Avom
No.	Date	Venue	Opponent	Score	Result	Competition	Ref.
1	4 September 2025	Ahmadou Ahidjo Stadium, Yaoundé, Cameroon	Eswatini	3–0	3–0	2026 FIFA World Cup qualification	

== Honours ==
Lorient

- Ligue 2: 2024–25
