= Ivane Urrubal =

Mozambican footballer

Personal information
- Birth name: Ivane Carminio Francisco Oficial Urrubal
- Date of birth: March 1, 1997 (age 29)
- Place of birth: Quelimane, Mozambique
- Height: 1.85 m (6 ft 1 in)
- Position: Goalkeeper

Team information
- Current team: Songo

Senior career*
Years	Team	Apps	(Gls)
2017–2018	Sporting Quelimane		
2018–2019	Chibuto		
2019–2024	Black Bulls		
2024–	Songo		

International career
2022–	Mozambique	10	(0)
- * Club domestic league appearances and goals

Ivane Carminio Francisco Oficial Urrubal (born 1 March 1997) is a Mozambican professional footballer who plays as a goalkeeper for Songo and the Mozambique national team.

== Career ==
Urrubal began his senior career in the Mozambican second division with Sporting Quelimane in 2017. The following season, he moved to Chibuto in the Moçambola. In 2019, he moved to Black Bulls, and he helped them win the 2021 Moçambola and 2023 Taça de Moçambique. On 21 January 2024, he moved to Songo.

== International ==
Urrubal debuted with the senior Mozambique national team in a 2–1 friendly loss to Mauritania on 26 March 2022. He was part of the final squad that went to 2023 Africa Cup of Nations. He went on to start for Mozambique in the tournament after the second group game.

== Honours ==
Black Bulls

- Moçambola: 2021
- Taça de Moçambique: 2023
