= Botswana national football team results (2020–present) =

The Botswana national football team represents Botswana in international football under the control of the Botswana Football Association. Following the independence of Botswana in 1966, the football federation was founded in 1970. It later joined the Confederation of African Football (CAF) in 1976 and FIFA in 1982.

The following list contains all results of Botswana's official matches since the year 2020.

== Key ==
The coloured backgrounds denote the result of the match:

– indicates Botswana won the match
– indicates Botswana's opposition won the match
– indicates the match ended in a draw

== Official Results ==
=== 2020 ===
12 November 2020 2021 AFCON qualification	Zambia	2–1	Botswana	Lusaka, Zambia
18:00 UTC+2	Enock Mwepu 45+1'; Collins Sikombe 66'	Report	Tumisang Orebonye 45'	Stadium: National Heroes Stadium; Referee: Jean-Jacques Ngambo (DR Congo)

16 November 2020 2021 AFCON qualification	Botswana	1–0	Zambia	Francistown, Botswana
18:00 UTC+2	Mosha Gaolaolwe 6'	Report		Stadium: Francistown Stadium; Referee: Ishmael Chizinga (Malawi)

=== 2021 ===
25 March 2021 2021 AFCON qualification	Botswana	0–1	Zimbabwe	Francistown, Botswana
18:00 UTC+2		Report	Perfect Chikwende 14'	Stadium: Francistown Stadium; Referee: Georges Gatogato (Burundi)

29 March 2021 2021 AFCON qualification	Algeria	5–0	Botswana	Blida, Algeria
20:00 UTC+1	Aïssa Mandi 24'; Sofiane Feghouli 58'; Riyad Mahrez 64' (pen.); Baghdad Bounedjah 72'; Farid Boulaya 88'	Report		Stadium: Mustapha Tchaker Stadium; Referee: Jean Ouattara (Burkina Faso)

6 July 2021 2021 COSAFA Cup	South Africa	1–0	Botswana	Port Elizabeth, South Africa
17:00 UTC+2	Kagiso Joseph Malinga 6'	Report		Stadium: Nelson Mandela Bay Stadium; Referee: Brighton Chimene (Zimbabwe)

10 July 2021 2021 COSAFA Cup	Lesotho	0–4	Botswana	Port Elizabeth, South Africa
12:00 UTC+2		Report	Tumisang Orebonye 28', 45+4' (pen.), 69'; Thatayaone Witness Kgamanyane 73'	Stadium: Wolfson Stadium; Referee: Thulani Sibandze (Eswatini)

13 July 2021 2021 COSAFA Cup	Zambia	2–1	Botswana	Port Elizabeth, South Africa
15:00 UTC+2	Justin Shonga 21', 83' (pen.)	Report	Thatayaone Kgamanyane 62'	Stadium: Wolfson Stadium; Referee: Thulani Sibandze (Eswatini)

14 July 2021 2021 COSAFA Cup	Eswatini	1–1	Botswana	Port Elizabeth, South Africa
15:00 UTC+2	Sabelo Ndzinisa 19'	Report	Thatayaone Kgamanyane 65'	Stadium: Wolfson Stadium; Referee: Audrick Nkole (Zambia)

=== 2022 ===
1 June 2022 2023 AFCON qualification	Libya	1–0	Botswana	Benghazi, Libya
18:00 UTC+2	Saleh Al Taher 54'	Report		Stadium: Benina Martyrs Stadium; Referee: Sekou Ahmed Toure (Guinea)

5 June 2022 2023 AFCON qualification	Botswana	0–0	Tunisia	Francistown, Botswana
15:00 UTC+2		Report		Stadium: Francistown Stadium; Referee: Mohamed Athoumani (Comoros)

5 July 2022 2022 COSAFA Cup	Seychelles	0–1	Botswana	Durban, South Africa
		Report	Thato Kebue 49'	Stadium: King Zwelithini Stadium

7 July 2022 2022 COSAFA Cup	Comoros	0–1	Botswana	Durban, South Africa
		Report	Baokeditswe Talane 40'	Stadium: King Zwelithini Stadium

10 July 2022 2022 COSAFA Cup	Angola	0–1	Botswana	Durban, South Africa
		Report	Goitseone Phoko 69' (pen.)	Stadium: King Zwelithini Stadium

12 July 2022 2022 COSAFA Cup	Zambia	1–1 (5–4 p)	Botswana	KwaMashu, South Africa
	Tebogo Kopelang 9' (o.g.)	Report	Benson Mangolo 52'	Stadium: Princess Magogo Stadium
	Penalties
	Ricky Banda (penalty scored); Kelvin Kapumbu (penalty scored); Luka Chamanga (penalty scored); Salulani Phiri (penalty scored); Dominic Chanda (penalty scored)		(penalty scored) Thato Kabue; (penalty scored) Baokeditswe Talane; (penalty missed) Kitso Mangolo; (penalty scored) Godfrey Tauyatswala; (penalty scored) Lebogang Ditsele

15 July 2022 2022 COSAFA Cup	Eswatini	0–2	Botswana	Durban, South Africa
		Report	Bame Morwalela 41'; Resaobaka Thatanyane 87'	Stadium: Sugar Ray Xulu Stadium

17 July 2022 2022 COSAFA Cup	South Africa	2–1	Botswana	Durban, South Africa
	Antonio Van Wyk 34'; Selaelo Rasebotja 80'	Report	Thato Kebue 90+3'	Stadium: Sugar Ray Xulu Stadium

23 July 2022 2022 CHAN qualification	Botswana	0–0	Eswatini	Francistown, Botswana
		Report		Stadium: Obed Itani Chilume Stadium

31 July 2022 2022 CHAN qualification	Eswatini	2–2	Botswana	Soweto, South Africa
	Sandile Gamedze 14'; Fanelo Mamba 51'	Report	Godfrey Tauyatswala; Thero Setsile (pen.)	Stadium: Orlando Stadium

27 August 2022 2022 CHAN qualification	Botswana	0–1	Madagascar	Francistown, Botswana
		Report	Fanomezantsoa Razanakoto 17'	Stadium: Obed Itani Chilume Stadium

2 September 2022 2022 CHAN qualification	Madagascar	1–1	Botswana	Antananarivo, Madagascar
	Marcio Ravelomanantsoa 23'	Report	Mothusi Johnson 66'	Stadium: Mahamasina Municipal Stadium

27 September 2022 Friendly	South Africa	1–0	Botswana	Nasrec, South Africa
	Teboho Mokoena 38'	Report		Stadium: FNB Stadium

17 November 2022 Friendly	Angola	1–0	Botswana	Soweto, South Africa
	Mabululu 41'	Report		Stadium: Dobsonville Stadium

=== 2023 ===
24 March 2023 2023 AFCON qualification	Equatorial Guinea	2–0	Botswana	Malabo, Equatorial Guinea
20:00 UTC+1	Saúl Coco 20'; Federico Bikoro 66'	Report		Stadium: Estadio de Malabo; Referee: Adalbert Diouf (Senegal)

28 March 2023 2023 AFCON qualification	Botswana	2–3	Equatorial Guinea	Francistown, Botswana
15:00 UTC+2	Mbatshi Elias 28'; Kabelo Seakanyeng 66' (pen.)	Report	Emilio Nsue 13'; Lebogang Ditsele 40' (o.g.); Iban Salvador 51'	Stadium: Francistown Stadium; Referee: Mohamed Diraneh Guedi (Djibouti)

17 June 2023 2023 AFCON qualification	Botswana	1–0	Libya	Francistown, Botswana
18:00 UTC+2	Gape Mohutsiwa 45'	Report		Stadium: Francistown Stadium; Referee: Samuel Uwikunda (Rwanda)

5 July 2023 2023 COSAFA Cup	Eswatini	0–1	Botswana	Durban, South Africa
15:00			Lebogang Ditsele 23'	Stadium: King Zwelithini Stadium

8 July 2023 2023 COSAFA Cup	South Africa	2-1	Botswana	Durban, South Africa
15:00	Rayners 66' (pen.); Mogaila 68'		Kgamanyane 63'	Stadium: King Zwelithini Stadium

11 July 2023 2023 COSAFA Cup	Namibia	0-0	Botswana	Durban, South Africa
18:00				Stadium: Chatsworth Stadium

7 September 2023 2023 AFCON qualification	Tunisia	3-0	Botswana	Tunis, Tunisia
20:00 UTC+1	Velaphi 60' (o.g.); Msakni 82', 90+3'	Report		Stadium: Stade Hammadi Agrebi

30 September Friendly	Botswana	1–1	Zimbabwe

16 October Friendly	Botswana	2–1	Eswatini

16 November 2026 FIFA World Cup qualification	Botswana	2–3	Mozambique	Francistown, Botswana
15:00 UTC+2	Tlhalefang 74'; Ngele 85'	Report	Clésio 14'; Ratifo 52'; Muiomo 75'	Stadium: Obed Itani Chilume Stadium; Referee: Peter Waweru (Kenya)

21 November 2026 FIFA World Cup qualification	Botswana	1–0	Guinea	Francistown, Botswana
15:00 UTC+2	Seakanyeng 79'	Report		Stadium: Obed Itani Chilume Stadium; Referee: Patrice Tanguy Mebiame (Gabon)

=== 2024 ===
8 January Friendly	Botswana	1–1	Mozambique	Johannesburg, South Africa
16:00 UTC+2	Seakanyeng 39' (pen.)	Report	Amade 90+5'	Stadium: Johannesburg Stadium

22 March Friendly	Botswana	0–0	Rwanda	Antananarivo, Madagascar
13:00 UTC+3				Stadium: Mahamasina Municipal Stadium

25 March Friendly	Burundi	0–0	Botswana	Antananarivo, Madagascar
13:00 UTC+3				Stadium: Mahamasina Municipal Stadium

7 June 2026 World Cup qualification	Uganda	1–0	Botswana	Kampala, Uganda
19:00 UTC+3	Shaban 74'	Report		Stadium: Mandela National Stadium; Attendance: 45,000; Referee: Clement Franklin Kpan (Ivory Coast)

10 June 2026 World Cup qualification	Somalia	1–3	Botswana	Maputo, Mozambique
15:00 UTC+2	Hassan 74'	Report	Sesinyi 10'; Gaolaolwe 53'; Seakanyeng 72'	Stadium: Estádio do Zimpeto; Referee: Emmanuel Mensah (Liberia)

26 June 2024 COSAFA Cup	Eswatini	0–0	Botswana	Gqeberha, South Africa
15:00		Report		Stadium: Nelson Mandela Bay Stadium

29 June 2024 COSAFA Cup	South Africa	0–0	Botswana	Gqeberha, South Africa
15:00		Report		Stadium: Isaac Wolfson Stadium

2 July 2024 COSAFA Cup	Mozambique	3–1	Botswana	Gqeberha, South Africa
15:00	Ferreira 45+2'; Dário 66'; Cândido 90+4'	Report	Kopelang 20'	Stadium: Isaac Wolfson Stadium

31 August Friendly	Libya	1–0	Botswana	Tripoli, Libya
18:00 UTC+2	Krawa'a 54' (pen.)	Report		Stadium: Tripoli Stadium

7 September 2025 AFCON qualification	Mauritania	1–0	Botswana	Nouakchott, Mauritania
16:00 UTC+0	Amar 84'	Report		Stadium: Cheikha Ould Boïdiya Stadium; Referee: Daniel Nii Laryea (Ghana)

10 September 2025 AFCON qualification	Botswana	0–4	Egypt	Francistown, Botswana
18:00 UTC+2		Report	Trézéguet 5', 29'; Salah 56'; M. Fathi 90+4'	Stadium: Obed Itani Chilume Stadium; Referee: Omar Abdulkadir Artan (Somalia)

10 October 2025 AFCON qualification	Cape Verde	0–1	Botswana	Praia, Cape Verde
15:00 UTC−1		Report	Orebonye 2'	Stadium: Estádio Nacional de Cabo Verde; Referee: Samir Guezzaz (Morocco)

15 October 2025 AFCON qualification	Botswana	1–0	Cape Verde	Francistown, Botswana
18:00 UTC+2	Sesinyi 52'	Report		Stadium: Obed Itani Chilume Stadium; Attendance: 8,000; Referee: Messie Nkounkou (Congo)

15 November 2025 AFCON qualification	Botswana	1–1	Mauritania	Francistown, Botswana
14:00 UTC+2	Baruti 18'	Report	Koïta 7'	Stadium: Obed Itani Chilume Stadium; Referee: Bamlak Tessema Weyesa (Ethiopia)

19 November 2025 AFCON qualification	Egypt	1–1	Botswana	Cairo, Egypt
19:00 UTC+2	Trézéguet 15'	Report	Kebatho 8'	Stadium: 30 June Stadium; Referee: Abdallah Jammeh (Gambia)

=== 2025 ===
21 March 2026 World Cup qualification	Botswana	1–3	Algeria	Francistown, Botswana
15:00 UTC+2	Kopelang 70'	Report (FIFA); Report (CAF)	Gouiri 44'; Amoura 52', 74'	Stadium: Obed Itani Chilume Stadium; Attendance: 3,278; Referee: Ahmed Arajiga (Tanzania)

25 March 2026 World Cup qualification	Botswana	2–0	Somalia	Francistown, Botswana
15:00 UTC+2		Report (FIFA); Report (CAF)		Stadium: Obed Itani Chilume Stadium

6 June 2025 COSAFA Cup	Comoros	0–0	Botswana	Bloemfontein, South Africa
18:00 UTC+2		Report		Stadium: Dr. Petrus Molemela Stadium; Referee: Arnaud Zafimahatoha (Madagascar)

11 June 2025 COSAFA Cup	Botswana	3–3	Zambia	Bloemfontein, South Africa
15:00 UTC+2	Kgamanyane 2'; Semadi 32' (pen.); Maponda 60'	Report	Zulu 45+3' (pen.); Sinkala 52'; Jo. Phiri 90' (pen.)	Stadium: Dr. Petrus Molemela Stadium; Referee: Akhona Makalima (South Africa)

4 September 2026 World Cup qualification	Algeria	3–1	Botswana	Tizi Ouzou, Algeria
20:00 UTC+1	Amoura 33'; Bounedjah 71', 90+6'	Report	Kopelang 43'	Stadium: Hocine Aït Ahmed Stadium; Referee: Pacifique Ndabihawenimana (Burundi)

8 September 2026 World Cup qualification	Mozambique	2–0	Botswana	Maputo, Mozambique
15:00 UTC+2	Witi 6'; Bangal 71'	Report		Stadium: Estádio do Zimpeto; Attendance: 20,000; Referee: Bamlak Tessema Weyesa (Ethiopia)

9 October 2026 World Cup qualification	Botswana	0–1	Uganda	Francistown, Botswana
18:00 UTC+2		Report	Ssemugabi 54'	Stadium: Obed Itani Chilume Stadium; Referee: Dahane Beida (Mauritania)

14 October 2026 World Cup qualification	Guinea	2–2	Botswana	Casablanca, Morocco
17:00 UTC+1	Traoré 18'; Baldé 35'	Report	Boy 7'; Mohutsiwa 45+2'	Stadium: Stade Mohammed V Attendance: 500; Referee: Messie Jessie Oved Nkounkou (Congo)

18 December Friendly	Tunisia	2–1	Botswana	Tabarka, Tunisia
15:00 UTC+1	Sliti 85', 90+4' (pen.)	Report	Orebonye 50'	Stadium: Tabarka Training Center; Attendance: 0 (Behind closed doors)

23 December 2025 AFCON Group Stage	Senegal	3–0	Botswana	Tangier, Morocco
16:00 UTC+1	Jackson 40', 58'; C. Ndiaye 90'	Report		Stadium: Ibn Batouta Stadium; Attendance: 18,591; Referee: Abdel Aziz Bouh (Mauritania)

27 December 2025 AFCON Group Stage	Benin	1–0	Botswana	Rabat, Morocco
13:30 UTC+1	Roche 28'	Report		Stadium: Rabat Olympic Stadium; Referee: Shamirah Nabadda (Uganda)

30 December 2025 AFCON Group Stage	Botswana	0–3	DR Congo	Rabat, Morocco
20:00 UTC+1		Report	Mbuku 31'; Kakuta 41' (pen.), 60'	Stadium: Al Barid Stadium; Referee: Ahmad Heeralall (Mauritius)

=== 2026 ===
28 March Mukuru Four Nations Tournament Semi-finals	Botswana	0–3	Zimbabwe	Francistown, Botswana
18:15 UTC+2		Report	Tshuma 24'; Bonne 33'; Antonio 45'	Stadium: Obed Itani Chilume Stadium; Referee: Chanshi Kasongo (Zambia)

31 March Mukuru Four Nations Tournament Third place play-offs	Botswana	0–1	Malawi	Francistown, Botswana
16:00 UTC+2		Report	Tshuma 66'	Stadium: Obed Itani Chilume Stadium; Referee: Owen Manenda (Zimbabwe)

TBD 2027 AFCON qualification	Botswana	v	Uganda	TBD, Botswana
TBD				Stadium: TBD

TBD 2027 AFCON qualification	Uganda	v	Botswana	TBD, Uganda
TBD				Stadium: TBD

TBD 2027 AFCON qualification	Botswana	v	Libya	TBD, Botswana
TBD				Stadium: TBD

TBD 2027 AFCON qualification	Libya	v	Botswana	TBD, Libya
TBD				Stadium: TBD

TBD 2027 AFCON qualification	Tunisia	v	Botswana	TBD, Tunisia
TBD				Stadium: TBD

TBD 2027 AFCON qualification	Botswana	v	Tunisia	TBD, Botswana
TBD				Stadium: TBD

== See also ==
- Botswana national football team results (1968–1999)
- Botswana national football team results (2000–2019)
