= 2026 FIFA World Cup qualification – CAF Group G =

Association football competition in Africa

The 2026 FIFA World Cup qualification – CAF Group G was a CAF qualifying group for the 2026 FIFA World Cup. The group contained Algeria, Guinea, Uganda, Mozambique, Botswana and Somalia.

The group winners, Algeria, directly qualified for the World Cup. The group runners-up, Uganda, were eliminated as one of the five worst runners-up.

== Standings ==
| Pos | Team | Pld | W | D | L | GF | GA | GD | Pts | Qualification | (Algeria) | (Uganda) | (Mozambique) | (Guinea) | (Botswana) | (Somalia) |
|---|---|---|---|---|---|---|---|---|---|---|---|---|---|---|---|---|
| 1 | Algeria | 10 | 8 | 1 | 1 | 24 | 8 | +16 | 25 | 2026 FIFA World Cup | — | 2–1 | 5–1 | 1–2 | 3–1 | 3–1 |
| 2 | Uganda | 10 | 6 | 0 | 4 | 14 | 9 | +5 | 18 | | 1–2 | — | 4–0 | 1–0 | 1–0 | 2–0 |
| 3 | Mozambique | 10 | 6 | 0 | 4 | 14 | 17 | −3 | 18 | | 0–2 | 3–1 | — | 1–2 | 2–0 | 2–1 |
| 4 | Guinea | 10 | 4 | 3 | 3 | 11 | 8 | +3 | 15 | | 0–0 | 2–1 | 0–1 | — | 2–2 | 0–0 |
| 5 | Botswana | 10 | 3 | 1 | 6 | 12 | 16 | −4 | 10 | | 1–3 | 0–1 | 2–3 | 1–0 | — | 2–0 |
| 6 | Somalia | 10 | 0 | 1 | 9 | 3 | 20 | −17 | 1 | | 0–3 | 0–1 | 0–1 | 0–3 | 1–3 | — |

Source: FIFA
Rules for classification: Tiebreakers

== Matches ==
16 November 2023
15:00 UTC+2

| Botswana | 2–3 | Mozambique |
|---|---|---|
| Tlhalefang 74'; Ngele 85' | Report | Clésio 14'; Ratifo 52'; Muiomo 75' |

Obed Itani Chilume Stadium, Francistown
Referee: Peter Waweru (Kenya)
16 November 2023
17:00 UTC+1

| Algeria | 3–1 | Somalia |
|---|---|---|
| Abdi 2' (o.g.); Bounedjah 31'; Slimani 80' | Report | Ahmed 65' |

Nelson Mandela Stadium, Algiers
Attendance: 40,784
Referee: Boubou Traore (Mali)
17 November 2023
14:00 UTC+1

| Guinea | 2–1 | Uganda |
|---|---|---|
| A. Camara 10'; S. Cissé 90+5' | Report | Bayo 30' |

Berkane Municipal Stadium, Berkane (Morocco)
Attendance: 250
Referee: Messie Jessie Oved Nkounkou Mvoutou (Congo)

19 November 2023
15:00 UTC+2

| Mozambique | 0–2 | Algeria |
|---|---|---|
| | Report | Chaïbi 69'; Zerrouki 80' |

Estádio do Zimpeto, Maputo
Referee: Samuel Uwikunda (Rwanda)
21 November 2023
15:00 UTC+2

| Botswana | 1–0 | Guinea |
|---|---|---|
| Seakanyeng 79' | Report |

Obed Itani Chilume Stadium, Francistown
Referee: Patrice Tanguy Mebiame (Gabon)
21 November 2023
14:00 UTC+1

| Somalia | 0–1 | Uganda |
|---|---|---|
| | Report | Mato 4' |

Berkane Municipal Stadium, Berkane (Morocco)
Attendance: 200
Referee: Pedro Ndong Ovono Obono (Equatorial Guinea)

6 June 2024
20:00 UTC+1

| Algeria | 1–2 | Guinea |
|---|---|---|
| Baldé 52' (o.g.) | Report | M. Sylla 50'; A. Camara 63' |

Nelson Mandela Stadium, Algiers
Attendance: 32,000
Referee: Bamlak Tessema Weyesa (Ethiopia)
7 June 2024
15:00 UTC+2

| Mozambique | 2–1 | Somalia |
|---|---|---|
| Amade 14'; Ratifo 29' | Report | Shirwa 66' |

Estádio do Zimpeto, Maputo
Attendance: 41,000
Referee: Tsegay Mogos Teklu (Eritrea)
7 June 2024
19:00 UTC+3

| Uganda | 1–0 | Botswana |
|---|---|---|
| Shaban 74' | Report |

Mandela National Stadium, Kampala
Attendance: 45,000
Referee: Clement Franklin Kpan (Ivory Coast)

10 June 2024
20:00 UTC+1

| Guinea | 0–1 | Mozambique |
|---|---|---|
| | Report | Catamo 90+3' (pen.) |

Ben M'Hamed El Abdi Stadium, El Jadida (Morocco)
Attendance: 550
Referee: Pacifique Ndabihawenimana (Burundi)
10 June 2024
19:00 UTC+3

| Uganda | 1–2 | Algeria |
|---|---|---|
| Mutyaba 10' | Report | Aouar 46'; Benrahma 58' |

Mandela National Stadium, Kampala
Attendance: 45,000
Referee: Adissa Abdul Raphiou Ligali (Benin)
10 June 2024
15:00 UTC+2

| Somalia | 1–3 | Botswana |
|---|---|---|
| Hassan 74' | Report | Sesinyi 10'; Gaolaolwe 53'; Seakanyeng 72' (pen.) |

Estádio do Zimpeto, Maputo (Mozambique)
Referee: Emmanuel Mensah (Liberia)

20 March 2025
15:00 UTC+2

| Mozambique | 3–1 | Uganda |
|---|---|---|
| Pepo 3', 16'; Ratifo 45+3' | Report | Shaban 7' |

Cairo International Stadium, Cairo (Egypt)
Attendance: 100
Referee: Pierre Atcho (Gabon)
21 March 2025
15:00 UTC+2

| Botswana | 1–3 | Algeria |
|---|---|---|
| Kopelang 70' | Report | Gouiri 44'; Amoura 52', 74' |

Obed Itani Chilume Stadium, Francistown
Attendance: 3,278
Referee: Ahmed Arajiga (Tanzania)
21 March 2025
21:00 UTC+0

| Guinea | 0–0 | Somalia |
|---|---|---|
| | Report |

Alassane Ouattara Stadium, Abidjan (Ivory Coast)
Attendance: 213
Referee: Andofetra Rakotojaona (Madagascar)

25 March 2025
19:00 UTC+3

| Uganda | 1–0 | Guinea |
|---|---|---|
| Okello 36' | Report |

Mandela National Stadium, Kampala
Referee: Jean-Jacques Ndala (DR Congo)
25 March 2025
20:00 UTC+2

| Botswana | 2–0 | Somalia |
|---|---|---|
| Mohutsiwa 74'; Johnson 83' | Report |

Obed Itani Chilume Stadium, Francistown
Referee: Joseph Ogabor (Nigeria)
25 March 2025
22:00 UTC+1

| Algeria | 5–1 | Mozambique |
|---|---|---|
| Amoura 8', 30', 80'; Mandi 24'; Hadjam 65' | Report | Geny Catamo 40' |

Hocine Aït Ahmed Stadium, Tizi Ouzou
Attendance: 54,500
Referee: Pacifique Ndabihawenimana (Burundi)

4 September 2025
20:00 UTC+1

| Algeria | 3–1 | Botswana |
|---|---|---|
| Amoura 33'; Bounedjah 71', 90+6' | Report | Kopelang 43' |

Hocine Aït Ahmed Stadium, Tizi Ouzou
Referee: Pacifique Ndabihawenimana (Burundi)
5 September 2025
15:00 UTC+3

| Somalia | 0–3 | Guinea |
|---|---|---|
| | Report | Guirassy 22'; Othman 64' (o.g.); O. Camara 90+6' |

Mandela National Stadium, Kampala (Uganda)
Referee: Tanguy Mebiame (Gabon)
5 September 2025
19:00 UTC+3

| Uganda | 4–0 | Mozambique |
|---|---|---|
| Okello 48'; Mato 70', 84'; Capradossi 90' | Report |

Mandela National Stadium, Kampala
Referee: Vincent Kaboré (Burkina Faso)

8 September 2025
15:00 UTC+2

| Mozambique | 2–0 | Botswana |
|---|---|---|
| Witi 6'; Bangal 71' | Report |

Estádio do Zimpeto, Maputo
Attendance: 20,000
Referee: Bamlak Tessema Weyesa (Ethiopia)
8 September 2025
19:00 UTC+3

| Uganda | 2–0 | Somalia |
|---|---|---|
| Okello 6' (pen.); Ssemugabi 39' | Report |

Mandela National Stadium, Kampala
Referee: Kalilou Ibrahim Traoré (Ivory Coast)
8 September 2025
17:00 UTC+1

| Guinea | 0–0 | Algeria |
|---|---|---|
| | Report |

Stade Mohammed V, Casablanca (Morocco)
Referee: Samuel Uwikunda (Rwanda)

9 October 2025
17:00 UTC+1

| Somalia | 0–3 | Algeria |
|---|---|---|
| | Report | Amoura 7', 57'; Mahrez 19' |

Miloud Hadefi Stadium, Oran (Algeria)
Referee: Godfrey Nkhakananga (Malawi)
9 October 2025
18:00 UTC+2

| Mozambique | 1–2 | Guinea |
|---|---|---|
| Mandava 19' | Report | Traoré 2', 59' |

Estádio do Zimpeto, Maputo
Referee: Adissa Abdul Raphiou Ligali (Benin)
9 October 2025
18:00 UTC+2

| Botswana | 0–1 | Uganda |
|---|---|---|
| | Report | Ssemugabi 54' |

Obed Itani Chilume Stadium, Francistown
Referee: Dahane Beida (Mauritania)

14 October 2025
17:00 UTC+1

| Guinea | 2–2 | Botswana |
|---|---|---|
| Traoré 18'; Baldé 35' | Report | Boy 7'; Mohutsiwa 45+2' |

Stade Mohammed V, Casablanca (Morocco)
Attendance: 500
Referee: Messie Jessie Oved Nkounkou (Congo)
14 October 2025
17:00 UTC+1

| Somalia | 0–1 | Mozambique |
|---|---|---|
| | Report | Catamo 6' |

Miloud Hadefi Stadium, Oran (Algeria)
Referee: Ahmed Abdulrazg (Libya)
14 October 2025
17:00 UTC+1

| Algeria | 2–1 | Uganda |
|---|---|---|
| Amoura 81' (pen.), 90+9' (pen.) | Report | Mukwala 6' |

Hocine Aït Ahmed Stadium, Tizi Ouzou
Attendance: 500
Referee: Ahmad Imtehaz Heeralall (Mauritius)

== Goalscorers ==
There were 78 goals scored in 30 matches, for an average of 2.6 goals per match.

10 goals

- (Algeria national football team) Mohamed Amoura

3 goals

- (Algeria national football team) Baghdad Bounedjah
- (Guinea national football team) Abdoul Karim Traoré
- (Mozambique national football team) Geny Catamo
- (Mozambique national football team) Stanley Ratifo
- (Uganda national football team) Rogers Mato
- (Uganda national football team) Allan Okello

2 goals

- (Botswana national football team) Tebogo Kopelang
- (Botswana national football team) Gape Mohutsiwa
- (Botswana national football team) Kabelo Seakanyeng
- (Guinea national football team) Aguibou Camara
- (Guinea national football team) Serhou Guirassy
- (Mozambique national football team) Pepo
- (Uganda national football team) Muhammad Shaban
- (Uganda national football team) Jude Ssemugabi

1 goal

- (Algeria national football team) Houssem Aouar
- (Algeria national football team) Said Benrahma
- (Algeria national football team) Farès Chaïbi
- (Algeria national football team) Amine Gouiri
- (Algeria national football team) Jaouen Hadjam
- (Algeria national football team) Riyad Mahrez
- (Algeria national football team) Aïssa Mandi
- (Algeria national football team) Islam Slimani
- (Algeria national football team) Ramiz Zerrouki
- (Botswana national football team) Segolame Boy
- (Botswana national football team) Mosha Gaolaolwe
- (Botswana national football team) Mothusi Johnson
- (Botswana national football team) Mogakolodi Ngele
- (Botswana national football team) Thabang Sesinyi
- (Botswana national football team) Molaodi Tlhalefang
- (Guinea national football team) Aliou Baldé
- (Guinea national football team) Ousmane Camara
- (Guinea national football team) Seydouba Cissé
- (Mozambique national football team) Alfons Amade
- (Mozambique national football team) Faisal Bangal
- (Mozambique national football team) Clésio
- (Mozambique national football team) Jonathan Muiomo
- (Mozambique national football team) Reinildo
- (Mozambique national football team) Witi
- (Somalia national football team) Yusuf Ahmed
- (Somalia national football team) Sak Hassan
- (Somalia national football team) Ismail Shirwa
- (Uganda national football team) Fahad Bayo
- (Uganda national football team) Elio Capradossi
- (Uganda national football team) Steven Mukwala
- (Uganda national football team) Travis Mutyaba

1 own goal

- (Guinea national football team) Yasser Baldé (against Algeria)
- (Somalia national football team) Ahmed Abdullahi Abdi (against Algeria)
- (Somalia national football team) Faisal Othman (against Guinea)

== Discipline ==
A player was automatically suspended for the next match for the following infractions:

- Receiving a red card (red card suspensions could be extended for serious infractions)
- Receiving two yellow cards in two different matches (yellow card suspensions were carried forward to further qualification rounds, but not the finals or any other future international matches)

The following suspensions were served during the group stage:

| Team | Player | Infraction(s) | Suspended for match(es) |
|---|---|---|---|
| Botswana | Alford Velaphi | (yellow card) vs Mozambique (16 November 2023); (yellow card) vs Guinea (21 November 2023) | vs Uganda (7 June 2024) |
| Mozambique | Nanani | (yellow card) vs Uganda (20 March 2025); (yellow card) vs Algeria (25 March 2025) | vs Uganda (5 September 2025) |
| Mozambique | Nené | (yellow card) vs Somalia (7 June 2024); (yellow card) vs Algeria (25 March 2025) | vs Uganda (5 September 2025) |
| Somalia | Mohamud Ali | (yellow card) vs Mozambique (7 June 2024); (yellow card) vs Botswana (10 June 2024) | vs Guinea (21 March 2025) |
| Somalia | Abel Gigli | (yellow card) vs Mozambique (7 June 2024); (yellow card) vs Botswana (25 March 2025) | vs Guinea (5 September 2025) |
| Somalia | Abdi Mohamed | (yellow card) vs Algeria (16 November 2023); (yellow card) (yellow-red card) vs Uganda (21 November 2023) | vs Mozambique (7 June 2024) |
| Uganda | Bobosi Byaruhanga | (yellow card) vs Guinea (17 November 2023); (yellow card) vs Algeria (10 June 2024) | vs Mozambique (20 March 2025) |
| Uganda | Aziz Kayondo | (yellow card) vs Guinea (17 November 2023); (yellow card) vs Somalia (21 November 2023) | vs Botswana (7 June 2024) |
| Uganda | Rogers Mato | (yellow card) vs Botswana (7 June 2024); (yellow card) vs Algeria (10 June 2024) | vs Mozambique (20 March 2025) |
| Uganda | Denis Omedi | (yellow card) (yellow-red card) vs Mozambique (20 March 2025) | vs Guinea (25 March 2025) |
