= 2023 Africa Cup of Nations Group B =

Football tournament group stage

Group B of the 2023 Africa Cup of Nations took place from 14 to 22 January 2024. The group consisted of Egypt, Ghana, Cape Verde, and Mozambique.

Cape Verde and Egypt as the top two teams advanced to the round of 16.

== Teams ==
Draw position	Team	Zone	Method of qualification	Date of qualification	Finals appearance	Last appearance	Previous best performance	FIFA Rankings	
Draw position	Team	Zone	Method of qualification	Date of qualification	Finals appearance	Last appearance	Previous best performance	October 2023 (Note: The rankings of October 2023 were used for seeding for the final draw.)	December 2023
B1	Egypt	UNAF	Group D winners	14 June 2023	26th	2021	Winners (1957, 1959 1986, 1998, 2006, 2008, 2010)	35	33
B2	Ghana	WAFU	Group E winners	7 September 2023	14th	2021	Winners (1963, 1965, 1978, 1982)	60	61
B3	Cape Verde	WAFU	Group B runners-up	18 June 2023	4th	2021	Quarter-finals (2013)	71	73
B4	Mozambique	COSAFA	Group L runners-up	18 June 2023	4th	2021	Group stage (1986, 1996, 1998, 2010)	113	111

== Standings ==
Pos	Team	Pld	W	D	L	GF	GA	GD	Pts	Qualification
1	Cape Verde	3	2	1	0	7	3	+4	7	Advance to knockout stage
2	Egypt	3	0	3	0	6	6	0	3	Advance to knockout stage
3	Ghana	3	0	2	1	5	6	−1	2 (Note: Tied on head-to-head points. Overall goal difference: Ghana −1, Mozambique −3.)	
4	Mozambique	3	0	2	1	4	7	−3	2	

Source: CAF
Rules for classification: Group stage tiebreakers

== Matches ==
All times are entirely local, GMT (UTC±0).

=== Egypt vs Mozambique ===
Egypt and Mozambique met for the sixth time, and this was also the fourth time both nations met in the Africa Cup of Nations. In the previous three meetings (1986, 1998 and 2010), Egypt won those respective matches 2–0. In addition, Egypt won both matches during the second round of the 2014 FIFA World Cup qualification.

Mostafa Mohamed got Egypt off to a dream start in the second minute with a thunderous shot after a missed opportunity by Mohamed Salah. However, Mozambique staged a strong fightback in the second half, first with Witi heading home in the 55th minute from a brilliant pinpoint cross by Domingos Macandza, before three minutes later Clésio put on a stunning turn of pace before slotting into the net. Nonetheless, Mozambique were cruelly denied a historic win by a foul from Macandza on Salah, and Salah converted the penalty off the left post for a draw in the seventh minute of added time.

14 January 2024
17:00

Egypt	2–2	Mozambique
Mohamed 2'; Salah 90+7' (pen.)	Report	Witi 55'; Clésio 58'

Felix Houphouet Boigny Stadium, Abidjan
Attendance: 11,933
Referee: Dahane Beida (Mauritania)

Egypt	Mozambique

GK	16	Mohamed El Shenawy
RB	3	Mohamed Hany		(substituted off) 66'
CB	24	Mohamed Abdelmonem	(yellow card) 75'
CB	6	Ahmed Hegazi
LB	12	Mohamed Hamdy
CM	17	Mohamed Elneny		(substituted off) 78'
CM	5	Hamdy Fathy
RW	10	Mohamed Salah (c)
AM	25	Zizo		(substituted off) 84'
LW	7	Trézéguet		(substituted off) 66'
CF	19	Mostafa Mohamed
Substitutions:
FW	22	Omar Marmoush		(substituted on) 66'
DF	4	Omar Kamal		(substituted on) 66'
MF	8	Emam Ashour		(substituted on) 78'
FW	9	Koka		(substituted on) 84'
Manager:
(Portugal) Rui Vitória

GK	1	Ernan Siluane
RB	14	Domingos
CB	17	Mexer
CB	8	Edmilson Dove
LB	15	Reinildo Mandava	(yellow card) 62'
CM	21	Guima	(yellow card) 72'	(substituted off) 89'
CM	16	Alfons Amade
RW	19	Witi		(substituted off) 81'
AM	7	Domingues (c)		(substituted off) 46'
LW	18	Gildo		(substituted off) 46'
CF	13	Stanley Ratifo		(substituted off) 66'
Substitutions:
FW	10	Clésio		(substituted on) 46'
DF	5	Bruno Langa		(substituted on) 46'
FW	9	Lau King	(yellow card) 90+11'	(substituted on) 66'
MF	6	Amadú		(substituted on) 81'
DF	4	Nené		(substituted on) 89'
Manager:
Chiquinho Conde

Man of the Match:
Guima (Mozambique)

Assistant referees:
Dimbiniaina Andriatianarivelo (Madagascar)
Jonathan Ahonto Koffi (Togo)
Fourth official:
Abdel Aziz Bouh (Mauritania)
Video assistant referee:
Peter Waweru (Kenya)
Assistant video assistant referee:
Haytem Guirat (Tunisia)

=== Ghana vs Cape Verde ===
Ghana and Cape Verde met for the sixth time ever, and this was their first encounter since the 2013 Africa Cup of Nations, which Ghana won 2–0. In addition, Ghana also defeated Cape Verde twice during qualifying for the 2006 FIFA World Cup, including a 4–0 win in Cape Verde. This outcome secured Ghana's qualification for a FIFA World Cup for the first time in the nation's history.

Jamiro Monteiro shocked the Ghanaians in the 17th minute by tapping into an empty net after Richard Ofori palmed Jovane Cabral’s fierce first-time effort into the goalscorer’s path. After being ruled out of an equaliser from Ransford Yeboah for offside before half-time, within 15 minutes of the restart, Alexander Djiku capitalised from the corner kick, bundled into the bottom corner to restore parity. However, feckless defending doomed the Ghanaians in the second minute of extra time, when Garry Rodrigues capitalized from Ghanaian errors to slot into an empty net for the shock win.

14 January 2024
20:00

Ghana	1–2	Cape Verde
Djiku 56'	Report	Monteiro 17'; Rodrigues 90+2'

Felix Houphouet Boigny Stadium, Abidjan
Attendance: 11,943
Referee: Jean-Jacques Ndala (DR Congo)

Ghana	Cape Verde

GK	1	Richard Ofori (c)
RB	3	Denis Odoi
CB	23	Alexander Djiku	(yellow card) 11'
CB	6	Mohammed Salisu
LB	14	Gideon Mensah
CM	26	Iddrisu Baba	(yellow card) 48'
CM	8	Majeed Ashimeru		(substituted off) 88'
RW	25	Antoine Semenyo		(substituted off) 62'
AM	7	Ransford Yeboah		(substituted off) 62'
LW	13	Joseph Paintsil	(yellow card) 54'	(substituted off) 62'
CF	9	Jordan Ayew		(substituted off) 90+3'
Substitutions:
FW	10	André Ayew		(substituted on) 62'
FW	24	Ernest Nuamah		(substituted on) 62'
FW	19	Iñaki Williams		(substituted on) 62'
MF	21	Salis Abdul Samed		(substituted on) 88'
FW	11	Osman Bukari		(substituted on) 90+3'
Manager:
(Republic of Ireland) Chris Hughton

GK	1	Vozinha
RB	26	Kevin Pina
CB	5	Logan Costa
CB	4	Pico
LB	7	Jovane Cabral		(substituted off) 84'
CM	14	Deroy Duarte	(yellow card) 64'	(substituted off) 68'
CM	8	João Paulo
CM	10	Jamiro Monteiro		(substituted off) 84'
RF	23	Steven Moreira
CF	20	Ryan Mendes (c)		(substituted off) 68'
LF	21	Bebé		(substituted off) 75'
Substitutions:
MF	18	Kenny Rocha	(yellow card) 74'	(substituted on) 68'
FW	11	Garry Rodrigues	(yellow card) 90+3'	(substituted on) 68'
FW	17	Willy Semedo		(substituted on) 75'
MF	15	Laros Duarte		(substituted on) 84'
FW	9	Gilson Tavares		(substituted on) 84'
Manager:
Bubista

Man of the Match:
Alexander Djiku (Ghana)

Assistant referees:
Elvis Noupue (Cameroon)
Abelmiro dos Reis (São Tomé and Príncipe)
Fourth official:
Ahmed Heerelal (Mauritius)
Video assistant referee:
Mustapha Ghorbal (Algeria)
Assistant video assistant referee:
Mokrane Gourari (Algeria)

=== Egypt vs Ghana ===
Egypt and Ghana met for the first time since a 1–1 draw on 12 November 2017, in the teams' group stage finale for the 2018 FIFA World Cup qualification. In addition, the nations also met at four previous editions of the Africa Cup of Nations, with the most recent being a group stage finale in 2017, when Mohamed Salah scored the only goal of the match in Port-Gentil, Gabon to give Egypt the 1–0 victory; coupled with Mali's 1–1 draw against Uganda, Ghana advanced to the knockout stage with Egypt. Ghana last defeated Egypt in 2013, winning 6–1 in the first leg of a playoff to determine who would qualify for the 2014 FIFA World Cup.

After a scoreless first 45 minutes, in first-half stoppage time Egyptian captain Mohamed Salah was injured, and within that time, Mohammed Kudus received a pass 25 yards from goal, shifted the ball away from Omar Marmoush and lashed in superbly to give Mohamed El Shenawy no chance. After Mohamed Abdelmonem got his equalizer ruled out for offside, Marmoush redeemed at the 69th minute by pouncing on an awful backpass by Iñaki Williams, rounding Richard Ofori and tucking home with aplomb. Kudus immediately responded by restoring parity just two minutes later with a deflecting shot from a failed Abdelmonem's clearance. Still, Ghana's lead was squandered just three minutes later when Trézéguet dispatched the ball from Osman Bukari, before cutting for Mostafa Mohamed to slot in to end the manic thriller to a draw.

18 January 2024
20:00

Egypt	2–2	Ghana
Marmoush 69'; Mohamed 74'	Report	Kudus 45+3', 71'

Felix Houphouet Boigny Stadium, Abidjan
Attendance: 20,808
Referee: Pierre Atcho (Gabon)

Egypt	Ghana

GK	16	Mohamed El Shenawy
RB	4	Omar Kamal
CB	24	Mohamed Abdelmonem
CB	6	Ahmed Hegazi
LB	12	Mohamed Hamdy
DM	17	Mohamed Elneny	(substituted off) 68'
DM	5	Hamdy Fathy
CM	8	Emam Ashour
RF	10	Mohamed Salah (c)	(substituted off) 45+2'
CF	19	Mostafa Mohamed
LF	22	Omar Marmoush	(substituted off) 90'
Substitutions:
FW	18	Mostafa Fathi	(substituted on) 45+2'
FW	7	Trézéguet	(substituted on) 68'
MF	14	Marwan Attia	(substituted on) 90'
Manager:
(Portugal) Rui Vitória

GK	1	Richard Ofori (c)
RB	3	Denis Odoi
CB	23	Alexander Djiku
CB	6	Mohammed Salisu
LB	14	Gideon Mensah
CM	21	Salis Abdul Samed	(yellow card) 38'	(substituted off) 89'
CM	8	Majeed Ashimeru		(substituted off) 62'
RW	25	Antoine Semenyo
AM	20	Mohammed Kudus
LW	19	Iñaki Williams		(substituted off) 73'
CF	9	Jordan Ayew
Substitutions:
MF	26	Iddrisu Baba		(substituted on) 62'
FW	11	Osman Bukari		(substituted on) 73'	(substituted off) 89'
MF	15	Elisha Owusu		(substituted on) 89'
FW	13	Joseph Paintsil		(substituted on) 89'
Manager:
(Republic of Ireland) Chris Hughton

Man of the Match:
Mohammed Kudus (Ghana)

Assistant referees:
Boris Ditsoga (Gabon)
Carine Atezambong (Cameroon)
Fourth official:
Tanguy Mebiame (Gabon)
Video assistant referee:
Issa Sy (Senegal)
Assistant video assistant referee:
Abongile Tom (South Africa)

=== Cape Verde vs Mozambique ===
Cape Verde and Mozambique met for the fifth time, as the previous four encounters involved qualifying matches for the Africa Cup of Nations. Both nations were drawn into Group F for qualification for the Africa Cup of Nations (along with Niger and Zambia), and the nations met twice in five days in October 2014. Mozambique, who had two draws coming into this match, won 2–0 in the first meeting against Cape Verde, who had opened qualifying with two victories, on 11 October 2014. In the return match on 15 October, Cape Verde got a 79th-minute goal from Heldon, which happened to be the match's only goal; coupled with other results, Cape Verde was one of two nations to secure qualification for the 2015 Africa Cup of Nations. The nations also met during qualifying for the 2021 Africa Cup of Nations, with the team's first meeting being a 2–2 draw in Praia; Cape Verde had been winning until they allowed a stoppage-time goal in that match. The COVID-19 pandemic caused the other match to be delayed. When the teams met again on 30 March 2021, it was another 1–0 victory for Cape Verde (this one, courtesy of an own goal from Mozambique's Faizal Bangal) that secured Cape Verde's qualification for the 2021 Africa Cup of Nations.

Cape Verde got off to a perfect start when Bebé produced a long-range set-piece shot to the net to give the Cape Verdeans the lead. In the 51st minute, Edmilson Dove's effort to hold the ball was intercepted by Ryan Mendes before Mendes doubled the West Africans' lead. Kevin Pina then ended any Mozambican hope for a comeback with a long-range shot.

This result meant Cape Verde advanced past the group stage in three out of four AFCON they had participated in.

19 January 2024
14:00

Cape Verde	3–0	Mozambique
Bebé 32'; Mendes 51'; Pina 69'	Report

Felix Houphouet Boigny Stadium, Abidjan
Attendance: 5,794
Referee: Samir Guezzaz (Morocco)

Cape Verde	Mozambique

GK	1	Vozinha
RB	26	Kevin Pina
CB	5	Logan Costa
CB	4	Pico
LB	7	Jovane Cabral	(yellow card) 61'	(substituted off) 75'
CM	14	Deroy Duarte		(substituted off) 80'
CM	10	Jamiro Monteiro		(substituted off) 80'
CM	8	João Paulo
RF	23	Steven Moreira		(substituted off) 75'
CF	20	Ryan Mendes (c)
LF	21	Bebé		(substituted off) 58'
Substitutions:
FW	17	Willy Semedo		(substituted on) 58'
FW	9	Gilson Tavares		(substituted on) 75'
FW	11	Garry Rodrigues		(substituted on) 75'
MF	18	Kenny Rocha		(substituted on) 80'
MF	13	Cuca		(substituted on) 80'
Manager:
Bubista

GK	1	Ernan Siluane
RB	14	Domingos	(substituted off) 78'
CB	17	Mexer (c)
CB	8	Edmilson Dove
LB	15	Reinildo Mandava
RM	20	Geny Catamo
CM	21	Guima
CM	16	Alfons Amade	(substituted off) 67'
LM	5	Bruno Langa	(substituted off) 78'
SS	19	Witi	(substituted off) 46'
CF	13	Stanley Ratifo	(substituted off) 46'
Substitutions:
MF	7	Domingues	(substituted on) 46'
FW	9	Lau King	(substituted on) 46'
MF	23	Shaquille	(substituted on) 67'
FW	18	Gildo	(substituted on) 78'
DF	2	Nanani	(substituted on) 78'
Manager:
Chiquinho Conde

Man of the Match:
Ryan Mendes (Cape Verde)

Assistant referees:
Lahcen Azgaou (Morocco)
Mustapha Akerkad (Morocco)
Fourth official:
Jalal Jiyed (Morocco)
Video assistant referee:
Redouane Jiyed (Morocco)
Assistant video assistant referee:
Zakaria Brinssi (Morocco)

=== Mozambique vs Ghana ===
Ghana and Mozambique met for the sixth time, with the first meeting coming in the final group matchday of the 1996 African Cup of Nations in South Africa, with Ghana winning 2–0. The two nations also met during qualification for the 2017 Africa Cup of Nations, playing twice in four days in March 2016.

The Black Stars were awarded a penalty in the 15th minute after Joseph Paintsil was fouled by Nanani and Mexer in the penalty area. Jordan Ayew converted successfully. The situation became more favourable for the Ghanaians when from an attack in the 66th minute, Reinildo Mandava handled a shot from Mohammed Kudus, leading to another penalty which Jordan Ayew again converted. However, André Ayew's handball won the Mozambicans a penalty themselves, scored by Geny Catamo in the first minute of stoppage time. Three minutes later, a corner kick coming from Richard Ofori's mishandling of the ball resulted in a header from Mandava, which tied the score but it proved to be futile as Mozambique crashed out; however, the draw also left Ghana in despair as they had to wait until the final matches, with their elimination confirmed the day after.

22 January 2024
20:00

Mozambique	2–2	Ghana
Geny 90+1' (pen.); Mandava 90+4'	Report	J. Ayew 15' (pen.), 70' (pen.)

Alassane Ouattara Stadium, Abidjan
Attendance: 6,000
Referee: Mutaz Ibrahim (Libya)

Mozambique	Ghana

GK	22	Ivane Urrubal
CB	2	Nanani	(yellow card) 84'
CB	17	Mexer (c)	(yellow card) 69'
CB	15	Reinildo Mandava	(yellow card) 67'
DM	4	Nené		(substituted off) 73'
CM	21	Guima		(substituted off) 87'
CM	16	Alfons Amade		(substituted off) 73'
RW	20	Geny Catamo	(yellow card) 31'
LW	5	Bruno Langa
SS	19	Witi		(substituted off) 61'
CF	9	Lau King		(substituted off) 87'
Substitutions:
FW	18	Gildo		(substituted on) 61'
FW	13	Stanley Ratifo		(substituted on) 73'
MF	7	Domingues		(substituted on) 73'
MF	11	João Bonde		(substituted on) 87'
MF	23	Shaquille		(substituted on) 87'
Manager:
Chiquinho Conde

GK	1	Richard Ofori (c)
RB	3	Denis Odoi		(substituted off) 72'
CB	23	Alexander Djiku	(yellow card) 62'
CB	6	Mohammed Salisu
LB	14	Gideon Mensah
CM	21	Salis Abdul Samed
CM	8	Majeed Ashimeru	(yellow card) 28'	(substituted off) 37'
RW	25	Antoine Semenyo		(substituted off) 72'
AM	20	Mohammed Kudus		(substituted off) 89'
LW	13	Joseph Paintsil		(substituted off) 46'
CF	9	Jordan Ayew	(yellow card) 83'
Substitutions:
MF	26	Iddrisu Baba	(yellow card) 58'	(substituted on) 37'
FW	10	André Ayew	(yellow card) 49'	(substituted on) 46'
DF	2	Alidu Seidu		(substituted on) 72'
DF	18	Daniel Amartey		(substituted on) 72'
FW	19	Iñaki Williams		(substituted on) 89'
Manager:
(Republic of Ireland) Chris Hughton

Man of the Match:
Mohammed Kudus (Ghana)

Assistant referees:
Djibril Camara (Senegal)
Abbes Zerhouni (Algeria)
Fourth official:
Samuel Uwikunda (Rwanda)
Video assistant referee:
Lahlou Benbraham (Algeria)
Assistant video assistant referee:
Salima Mukansanga (Rwanda)

=== Cape Verde vs Egypt ===
Cape Verde and Egypt met for the first time ever in this group stage finale.

The match got off to a high-tempo start as Egypt was desperate to gain a ticket to advance. Despite Cape Verde having guaranteed their top spot, it was the Cape Verdeans who stroke first in the first minute of extra time when Gilson Tavares swiveled and fired the ball into the bottom corner at the disbelief of the Egyptians. Five minutes after the restart, however, Trézéguet would find the back of the net for Egypt thanks to a clinical pass from Ahmed Hegazi before putting through the legs of Vozinha. The Egyptians, inspired by this goal, poured everything to find the second, and they were rewarded in the third minute of added time when Mostafa Mohamed, with the wit from his teammate Trézéguet's pass, dank the onrushing Vozinha to make it two for Egypt. However, just six minutes later, Egypt squandered the lead when Bryan Teixeira pounced over Mohamed El Shenawy to seal the deal of the match to a thrilling draw.

This was the first time Cape Verde topped the table of the group stage in an AFCON. Meanwhile, despite three consecutive 2–2 draws, Egypt advanced to the knockout stage, thanks to Ghana dropping two points to Mozambique.

22 January 2024
20:00

Cape Verde	2–2	Egypt
G. Tavares 45+1'; Teixeira 90+9'	Report	Trézéguet 50'; Mohamed 90+3'

Felix Houphouet Boigny Stadium, Abidjan
Attendance: 15,650
Referee: Alhadi Allaou Mahamat (Chad)

Cape Verde	Egypt

GK	1	Vozinha
RB	26	Kevin Pina	(yellow card) 71'	(substituted off) 75'
CB	5	Logan Costa
CB	3	Diney
LB	16	Dylan Tavares
RM	20	Ryan Mendes (c)		(substituted off) 64'
CM	6	Patrick Andrade		(substituted off) 70'
CM	18	Kenny Rocha
LM	17	Willy Semedo
SS	11	Garry Rodrigues		(substituted off) 64'
CF	9	Gilson Tavares		(substituted off) 64'
Substitutions:
FW	19	Bryan Teixeira		(substituted on) 64'
DF	23	Steven Moreira		(substituted on) 64'
MF	10	Jamiro Monteiro		(substituted on) 64'
MF	8	João Paulo		(substituted on) 70'
MF	13	Cuca		(substituted on) 75'
Manager:
Bubista

GK	16	Mohamed El Shenawy		(substituted off) 90+12'
RB	3	Mohamed Hany
CB	24	Mohamed Abdelmonem
CB	6	Ahmed Hegazi (c)	(yellow card) 88'
LB	13	Ahmed Fatouh		(substituted off) 46'
DM	14	Marwan Attia
DM	5	Hamdy Fathy		(substituted off) 46'
CM	8	Emam Ashour
RF	25	Zizo		(substituted off) 74'
CF	19	Mostafa Mohamed
LF	22	Omar Marmoush	(yellow card) 63'	(substituted off) 83'
Substitutions:
FW	7	Trézéguet		(substituted on) 46'
DF	12	Mohamed Hamdy		(substituted on) 46'
FW	11	Kahraba		(substituted on) 74'
FW	18	Mostafa Fathi		(substituted on) 83'
GK	23	Mohamed Abou Gabal		(substituted on) 90+12'
Manager:
(Portugal) Rui Vitória

Man of the Match:
Trézéguet (Egypt)

Assistant referees:
Liban Abdoulrazack (Djibouti)
Steven Moutsassi (Congo)
Fourth official:
Patrice Tanguy (Gabon)
Video assistant referee:
Abongile Tom (South Africa)
Assistant video assistant referee:
Maria Rivet (Mauritius)

== Discipline ==
Fair play points would have been used as tiebreakers if the overall and head-to-head records of teams were tied. These were calculated based on yellow and red cards received in all group matches as follows:

Only one of the above deductions was applied to a player in a single match.

Team	Match 1				Match 2				Match 3				Points
Team	Booked	(yellow card) (yellow-red card)	Sent off (straight red)	(yellow card) (red card)	Booked	(yellow card) (yellow-red card)	Sent off (straight red)	(yellow card) (red card)	Booked	(yellow card) (yellow-red card)	Sent off (straight red)	(yellow card) (red card)	Points
Egypt	1								2				–3
Ghana	3				1				5				–9
Cape Verde	3				1				1				–5
Mozambique	3								4				–7
