= Pepo Santos =

Mozambican footballer

Personal information
- Full name: Pedro Miguel Neves Santos
- Date of birth: 24 March 1994 (age 32)
- Place of birth: Caldas da Rainha, Portugal
- Height: 1.70 m (5 ft 7 in)
- Position: Midfielder

Team information
- Current team: Caldas
- Number: 5

Youth career
- 2002–2006: Escola Académica
- 2006–2007: Benfica
- 2007–2009: Caldas
- 2009–2010: Beneditense
- 2010–2013: União Leiria

Senior career*
Years	Team	Apps	(Gls)
2013–2014	União Leiria	15	(1)
2014–2015	Torreense	30	(4)
2015	Vianense	8	(1)
2015–2016	Torreense	21	(0)
2016–2019	União Leiria	57	(9)
2018–2019	Leixões	0	(0)
2018–2019	→ União Leiria (loan)	31	(7)
2019–2020	Vilafranquense	21	(1)
2020–2021	Cova da Piedade	26	(1)
2021–2022	Alverca	3	(0)
2022–2023	Académica de Coimbra	16	(0)
2023–	Caldas	63	(6)

International career^{‡}
2024–	Mozambique	13	(2)
- * Club domestic league appearances and goals as of 7 May 2026 ‡ National team caps and goals as of 21 February 2026

Pedro Miguel Neves Santos, known as Pepo Santos (born 24 March 1994) is a professional footballer who plays as a midfielder for Caldas. Born in Portugal, he represents the Mozambique national team.

== Club career ==
He made his Taça da Liga debut for Vilafranquense on 28 July 2019 in a game against Casa Pia.

== International career ==
Pepo made his debut for the Mozambique national team on 10 June 2024 in a World Cup qualifier against Guinea at Ben M'Hamed El Abdi Stadium in El Jadida, Morocco. He substituted Alfons Amade in the 70th minute, as Mozambique won 1–0.

== Career statistics ==
=== International ===
As of match played 17 November 2025

Appearances and goals by national team and year
National team	Year	Apps	Goals
Mozambique	2024	6	0
Mozambique	2025	7	2
Total		13	2

Scores and results list Mozambique's goal tally first, score column indicates score after each Santos goal.

List of international goals scored by Pepo Santos
No.	Date	Venue	Opponent	Score	Result	Competition	Ref.
1	20 March 2025	Cairo International Stadium, Cairo, Egypt	Uganda	1–0	3–1	2026 FIFA World Cup qualification	
2	20 March 2025	Cairo International Stadium, Cairo, Egypt	Uganda	2–1	3–1	2026 FIFA World Cup qualification	
