= Reinildo Mandava =

Mozambican footballer (born 1994)

- Mandava playing for Sunderland in 2026

Personal information
- Full name: Reinildo Isnard Mandava
- Date of birth: 21 January 1994 (age 32)
- Place of birth: Beira, Mozambique
- Height: 1.80 m (5 ft 11 in)
- Position: Left-back

Team information
- Current team: Sunderland
- Number: 17

Senior career*
Years	Team	Apps	(Gls)
2012–2014	Ferroviário da Beira		
2014–2015	GD Maputo		
2015–2018	Benfica B	1	(0)
2017	→ Fafe (loan)	16	(1)
2017–2018	→ Sporting Covilhã (loan)	30	(4)
2018–2019	B-SAD	16	(0)
2019	→ Lille (loan)	3	(0)
2019–2022	Lille	63	(1)
2022–2025	Atlético Madrid	74	(2)
2025–	Sunderland	35	(0)

International career^{‡}
2013–2026	Mozambique	56	(5)
- * Club domestic league appearances and goals as of 08:34, 22 November 2026 (UTC) ‡ National team caps and goals as of 23:15, 5 January 2026 (UTC)

Reinildo Isnard Mandava (born 21 January 1994), also known mononymously as Reinildo, is a Mozambican professional footballer who plays as a left-back for Premier League club Sunderland.

== Club career ==
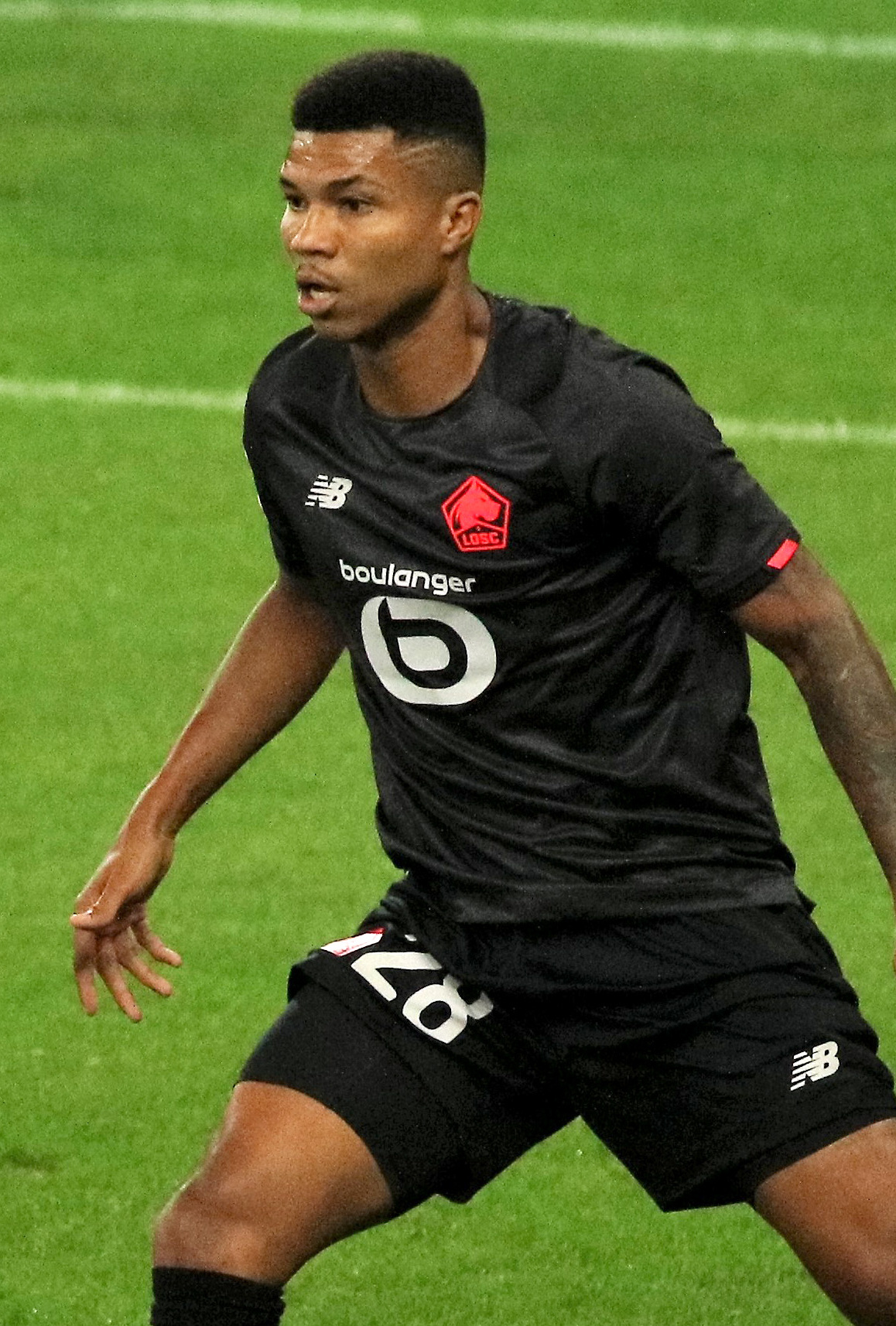
Mandava playing for Lille in 2021

Born in Beira, Reinildo began his football career with Ferroviário da Beira and GD Maputo. In December 2015, he signed for Portuguese club Benfica and was assigned to their reserve team. In June 2017, he was loaned out to Sporting da Covilhã in LigaPro for one season.

In 2018 he moved to Belenenses SAD, and in January 2019 he moved to French club Lille on loan with a €3 million option to purchase the player at the end of the season. On 31 May 2019, it was confirmed that Lille had completed the permanent purchase of Reinildo.

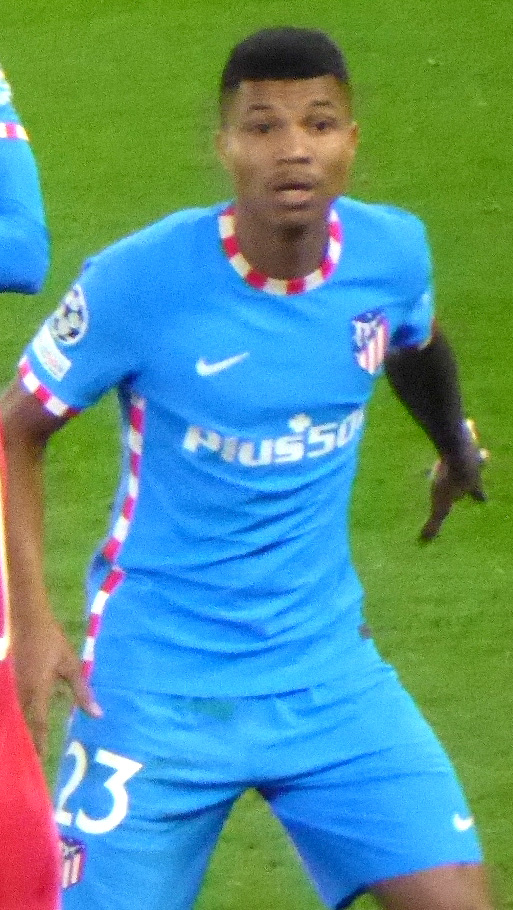
Reinildo with Atlético Madrid in 2022

On 31 January 2022, Spanish club Atlético Madrid announced the transfer of Reinildo on a three-and-a-half-year contract. He left the club on 30 June 2025, following the expiry of his contract.

On 8 July 2025, English club Sunderland announced the signing of Reinildo on a two-year contract. He made his Sunderland debut in the club's opening game of the 2025–26 Premier League season, a 3–0 win over West Ham, becoming the first Mozambican to play in the Premier League.

On 12 September 2026, Mandava gave away a penalty and got a red card after receiving his second booking for a foul on Bukayo Saka, with the game against Arsenal ending in a 2–0 defeat.

== International career ==
He made his debut for the Mozambique national team on 22 December 2013 in a friendly match against Swaziland, which ended in a 1–1 draw. He scored his first international goal on 20 June 2015 against the Seychelles, and found the net again a few days later against the same team. Both matches were part of the qualifying rounds for the 2016 African Nations Championship.

In December 2023, he was included in the list of twenty-seven Mozambican players selected by Chiquinho Conde to take part in the 2023 Africa Cup of Nations. This marked Reinildo’s first appearance in a major international tournament.

In December 2025, he was named in the list of 25 Mozambican players selected by Chiquinho Conde to take part in the 2025 Africa Cup of Nations.

== Career statistics ==
=== Club ===
As of match played 21 November 2026

Appearances and goals by club, season and competition
Club	Season	League			National cup (Note: Includes Taça de Portugal, Coupe de France, Copa del Rey)		League cup (Note: Includes Taça da Liga, Coupe de la Ligue)		Europe		Other		Total	
Club	Season	Division	Apps	Goals	Apps	Goals	Apps	Goals	Apps	Goals	Apps	Goals	Apps	Goals
Benfica B	2016–17	LigaPro	1	0	—		—		—		—		1	0
Fafe (loan)	2016–17	LigaPro	16	1	0	0	0	0	—		—		16	1
Sporting Covilhã (loan)	2017–18	LigaPro	30	4	0	0	1	0	—		—		31	4
Belenenses SAD	2018–19	Primeira Liga	16	0	1	0	2	1	—		—		19	1
Lille (loan)	2018–19	Ligue 1	3	0	—		—		—		—		3	0
Lille	2019–20	Ligue 1	16	0	2	0	2	0	2 (Note: Appearance(s) in UEFA Champions League)	0	—		22	0
Lille	2020–21	Ligue 1	29	0	0	0	—		6 (Note: Appearances in UEFA Europa League)	0	—		35	0
Lille	2021–22	Ligue 1	18	1	2	0	—		6	0	1 (Note: Appearance in Trophée des Champions)	0	27	1
Lille	Lille total		63	1	4	0	2	0	14	0	1	0	84	1
Atlético Madrid	2021–22	La Liga	17	0	—		—		4	0	—		21	0
Atlético Madrid	2022–23	La Liga	22	0	5	0	—		6	0	—		33	0
Atlético Madrid	2023–24	La Liga	16	2	2	0	—		1	0	0	0	19	2
Atlético Madrid	2024–25	La Liga	19	0	4	0	—		6	0	1 (Note: Appearance in FIFA Club World Cup)	0	30	0
Atlético Madrid	Total		74	2	11	0	—		17	0	1	0	103	2
Sunderland	2025–26	Premier League	25	0	0	0	0	0	—		—		25	0
Sunderland	2026–27	Premier League	10	0	0	0	0	0	4	0	—		14	0
Sunderland	Total		35	0	0	0	0	0	4	0	0	0	39	0
Career total			237	8	16	0	5	1	35	0	2	0	295	9

=== International ===
Appearances and goals by national team and year
National team	Year	Apps	Goals
Mozambique	2013	1	0
Mozambique	2014	1	0
Mozambique	2015	7	2
Mozambique	2016	1	0
Mozambique	2017	3	0
Mozambique	2018	4	0
Mozambique	2019	5	0
Mozambique	2020	3	0
Mozambique	2021	6	0
Mozambique	2022	4	0
Mozambique	2023	0	0
Mozambique	2024	12	2
Mozambique	2025	8	1
Mozambique	2026	1	0
Total		56	5

Scores and results list Mozambique's goal tally first, score column indicates score after each Reinildo goal.

List of international goals scored by Reinildo Mandava
No.	Date	Venue	Opponent	Score	Result	Competition
1	20 June 2015	Estádio do Ferroviário, Beira, Mozambique	Seychelles	2–0	5–1	2016 African Nations Championship qualification
2	4 July 2015	Stade Linité, Victoria, Seychelles	Seychelles	4–0	4–0	2016 African Nations Championship qualification
3	6 January 2024	FNB Stadium, Johannesburg, South Africa	Lesotho	1–0	2–0	Friendly
4	22 January 2024	Alassane Ouattara Stadium, Abidjan, Ivory Coast	Ghana	2–2	2–2	2023 Africa Cup of Nations
5	9 October 2025	Estádio do Zimpeto, Maputo, Mozambique	Guinea	1–1	1–2	2026 FIFA World Cup qualification

== Honours ==
Lille

- Ligue 1: 2020–21
- Trophée des Champions: 2021

Mozambique

- COSAFA Cup runner-up: 2015

Individual

- UNFP Ligue 1 Team of the Year: 2020–21
