= Kabelo Seakanyeng =

Motswana footballer (born 1993)

Personal information
- Date of birth: 25 June 1993 (age 33)
- Place of birth: Serowe, Botswana
- Height: 1.71 m (5 ft 7 in)
- Position: Left winger

Team information
- Current team: Mahgreb Fes
- Number: 7

Senior career*
Years	Team	Apps	(Gls)
2011–2015	Botswana Defence Force		
2016–2018	Gaborone United		
2018–2019	Chippa United	3	(0)
2019	TS Galaxy		
2019–2020	Lija Athletic	19	(7)
2020–2024	Olympique Khouribga		
2022	→ Dibba Al Fujairah (loan)	2	
2024-	Mahgreb Fes	33	(5)

International career^{‡}
2014–	Botswana	61	(10)
- * Club domestic league appearances and goals as of 06:11, 30 April 2026 (UTC) ‡ National team caps and goals as of 17:10, 10 June 2024 (UTC)

Kabelo Seakanyeng (born 25 June 1993) is a Motswana professional footballer who plays as a left winger for Mahgreb Fes.

== Club career ==
Seakanyeng was named the best player of the 2013–14 Botswana Premier League, while playing for Botswana Defence Force. He is currently playing for Mahgreb Fes in Botola Pro.

== International career ==
Seakanyeng scored goals in Botswana's first two group stage matches at the 2018 COSAFA Cup.

== Career statistics ==
=== Club ===
As of 5 April 2019.

Club	Season	League			Cup		Continental		Other		Total	
Club	Season	Division	Apps	Goals	Apps	Goals	Apps	Goals	Apps	Goals	Apps	Goals
Chippa United	2018–19	Absa Premiership	3	0	0	0	–		0	0	3	0
Career total			3	0	0	0	0	0	0	0	3	0

=== International ===
As of matches played 5 April 2019.

National team	Year	Apps	Goals
Botswana	2014	4	0
Botswana	2015	11	1
Botswana	2016	7	1
Botswana	2017	8	0
Botswana	2018	12	4
Botswana	2019	2	0
Botswana	2020	2	0
Botswana	2022	4	0
Botswana	2023	6	2
Botswana	2024	5	2
Total		61	10

=== International goals ===
Scores and results list Botswana's goal tally first.

No	Date	Venue	Opponent	Score	Result	Competition
1.	25 March 2015	Gaborone, Botswana	Lesotho	2–0	2–0	Friendly
2.	25 June 2016	Sam Nujoma Stadium, Windhoek, Namibia	South Africa	2–2	2–3	2016 COSAFA Cup
3.	18 April 2018	National Sports Stadium, Harare, Zimbabwe	Zimbabwe	1–0	1–0	Friendly
4.	28 May 2018	Old Peter Mokaba Stadium, Polokwane, South Africa	Angola	1–0	2–1	2018 COSAFA Cup
5.	30 May 2018	Old Peter Mokaba Stadium, Polokwane, South Africa	Malawi	1–1	1–1	2018 COSAFA Cup
6.	1 June 2018	Old Peter Mokaba Stadium, Polokwane, South Africa	Mauritius	4–0	6–0	2018 COSAFA Cup
7.	28 March 2023	Obed Itani Chilume Stadium, Francistown, Botswana	Equatorial Guinea	2–3	2–3	2023 Africa Cup of Nations qualification
8.	21 November 2023	Obed Itani Chilume Stadium, Francistown, Botswana	Guinea	1–0	1–0	2026 FIFA World Cup qualification
9.	8 January 2024	FNB Stadium, Johannesburg, South Africa	Mozambique	1–0	1–1	Friendly
10.	10 June 2024	Estádio do Zimpeto, Maputo, Mozambique	Somalia	3–0	3–1	2026 FIFA World Cup qualification

== Honours ==
Team

- Botola Pro 2025/26

Individual

- Mascom Top 8 Cup Player of the Tournament: 2014
- Botola Team of the Season: 2021–22
