= Jude Ssemugabi =

Ugandan footballer

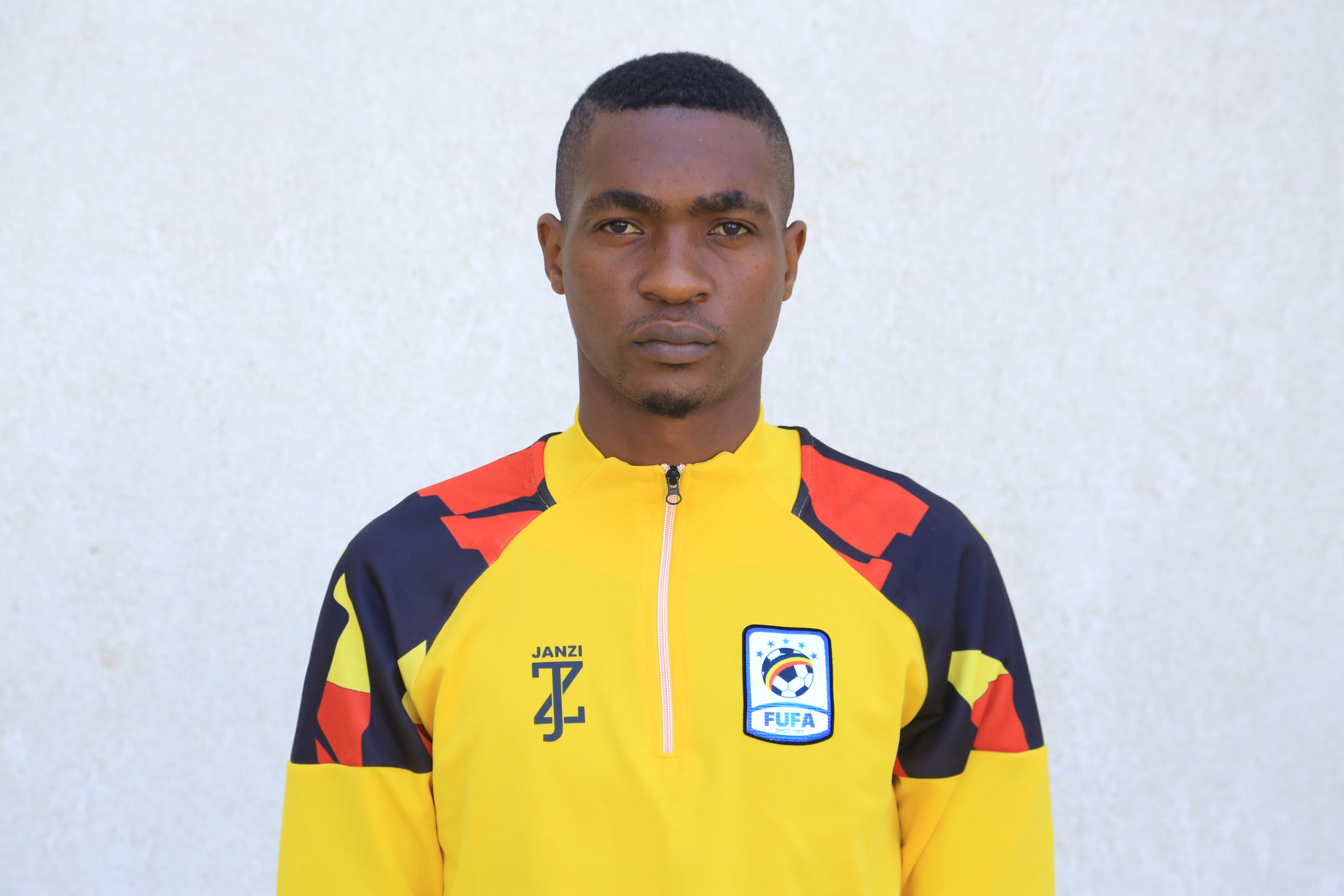

Personal information
- Date of birth: 3 March 1997 (age 29)
- Place of birth: Kayunga, Uganda
- Position: Forward

Team information
- Current team: Jamus
- Number: 37

Youth career
- Wabigalo Football Academy
- Lake Victoria Football Academy

Senior career*
Years	Team	Apps	(Gls)
- Kiboga Young Football Club
2018–2023	Mbarara		
2023–2025	Kitara FC	34	(12)
2025–	Jamus	0	(0)

International career^{‡}
2024–	Uganda	14	(4)
- * Club domestic league appearances and goals ‡ National team caps and goals as of 9 October 2025

Jude Ssemugabi (born 3rd March 1997) is a Ugandan professional footballer who also plays as forward for South Sudan Premier League club Jamus and the Uganda national team.

He made his debut for the Uganda national team against Congo on 11 September 2024 in the 2025 Africa Cup of Nations Qualifiers, scoring the second goal for Uganda.

== Club career ==
Ssemugabi started his career at Wabigalo Football Academy before joining Lake Victoria Soccer Academy in Entebbe.

=== Mbarara City FC ===
In August 2018, Ssemugabi signed for Mbarara City FC after being the top scorer in the Masaza ga Buganda competitions of 2018 with Ssaza Ssingo. During his stay at Mbarara City, he helped them gain promotion to top tier league in 2023/24 season.

=== Kitara FC ===
In July 2023, Ssemugabi signed a one year contract to become the 5th signing for the club in the transfer window after spending 5 years at Mbarara City FC. He Scored 6 goals in his first season 0f 2023/24 helping them win the Stanbic Uganda Cup, while In his last season with Kitara fc of 2024/25 scored 10 goals.

=== Jamus SC ===
In June 2025, Signed for South Sudan Premier League side Jamus SC from Kitara FC.

== International career ==
In August, 2024, Jude Ssemugabi was summoned in Coch Paul Put's Uganda Cranes squad to face South Africa and Congo in the Africa Cup of Nations Qualifiers 2025.

He made his debut against Congo in the Africa Cup of Nations Qualifiers 2025 when he came as a substitute in the first half for Muhammad Shaban and scored a second goal for the Uganda Cranes as Uganda beat Congo 2-0 at Mandela National Stadium, Namboole. He was part of Uganda Cranes Squad that qualified to 2025 Africa Cup of Nations in Morocco.

== Career statistics ==
=== International goals ===
Appearances and goals by national team and year
National team	Year	Apps	Goals
Uganda	2024	4	1
Uganda	2025	10	3
Total		14	4

Scores and results list Uganda's goal tally first.

No.	Date	Venue	Opponent	Score	Result	Competition
1.	9 September 2024	Mandela National Stadium, Kampala, Uganda	Congo	2–0	2–0	2025 Africa Cup of Nations qualification
2.	18 August 2025	Mandela National Stadium, Kampala, Uganda	South Africa	1–0	3–3	2024 African Nations Championship
3.	8 September 2025	Mandela National Stadium, Kampala, Uganda	Somalia	2–0	2–0	2026 FIFA World Cup qualification
4.	9 October 2025	Obed Itani Chilume Stadium, Francistown, Botswana	Botswana	1–0	1–0	2026 FIFA World Cup qualification
