= Geny Catamo =

Mozambican footballer (born 2001)

Personal information
- Full name: Geny Cipriano Catamo
- Date of birth: 26 January 2001 (age 25)
- Place of birth: Maputo, Mozambique
- Height: 1.72 m (5 ft 8 in)
- Position: Right winger

Team information
- Current team: Sporting CP
- Number: 10

Youth career
- Maxaquene
- Black Bulls

Senior career*
Years	Team	Apps	(Gls)
2018–2019	Amora	4	(1)
2019–2022	Sporting CP B	30	(2)
2021–	Sporting CP	97	(17)
2022	→ Vitória Guimarães (loan)	10	(0)
2022–2023	→ Marítimo (loan)	9	(1)
2023	→ Marítimo B (loan)	1	(1)

International career^{‡}
- Mozambique U17
2018	Mozambique U20	1	(1)
2019–	Mozambique	44	(15)
- * Club domestic league appearances and goals as of 25 October 2026 ‡ National team caps and goals as of 25 September 2026

Geny Cipriano Catamo (born 26 January 2001), sometimes known simply as Geny, is a Mozambican professional footballer who plays as a right winger for Primeira Liga club Sporting CP and the Mozambique national team.

== Club career ==
=== Maxaquene and Black Bulls ===
In Mozambique, he started his football training in Maxaquene, becoming a youth international for Mozambique, and then he moved on to the Black Bulls youth academy, another club from Maputo.

Under a protocol with Porto, the Black Bulls' best players travelled in 2018 to play with Porto's youth team. Catamo played well, but bureaucratic problems at the beginning and different views on the transfer model with the Black Bulls prevented Catamo from moving to Porto. He also had a trial at Benfica, but he didn't stay there either. He ended up at Amora, a Portuguese club whose football SAD was owned at the time by Mozambican investors.

=== Amora ===
Catamo arrived in Portugal in 2018. His performances for Amora's junior and senior teams prompted Sporting CP to recruit Catamo in 2019.

=== Sporting CP ===
On 11 June 2019, Catamo joined the youth academy of Sporting CP from Amora in a loan deal. Catamo signed a professional contract with Sporting in September 2020 after spending the 2019–2020 season at the club's Cristiano Ronaldo Academy. He made his debut for the first team on 29 December 2021, playing the last 30 minutes of a 3–2 victory against Portimonense.

After two loan spells with Vitória Guimarães and Marítimo, Catamo joined the first team again, and on 22 December 2023, he signed a new five-year contract with Sporting, with his release clause being set at €60 million. That season he made 41 appearances and scored 6 goals in all competitions. On 6 April 2024, Sporting won the Lisbon derby against Benfica 2–1, with both goals coming from Catamo, who was also named as the man of the match. Catamo scored seven goals in all competitions in the 2024–25 season, as Sporting completed a domestic double for the first time since the 2001–02 season, and successfully defended their league title. On 13 December 2025, Catamo scored a brace as Sporting beat Aves 6–0.

== International career ==
Catamo represented the Mozambique U20 in December 2018, scoring on his debut in the 2018 COSAFA U-20 Cup. He had previously played in the 2017 COSAFA Under-17 Championship.

Catamo debuted with the senior Mozambique national football team in a 2–0 win over Mauritius on 10 September 2019, again scoring in his debut. On 28 December 2025, he converted a penalty and provided an assist in a 3–2 victory over Gabon during the 2025 Africa Cup of Nations, securing his nation's first ever win in the competition.

== Style of play ==
Catamo stands out above all in attack, with many duels won per game, a statistic that reflects the assertiveness of his actions. Added to this is his effective dribbling and finishing ability. Another skill he excels at is his ability to add speed to his team's play down the right.

== Personal life ==
Catamo is Married to Jennifer Bule, a Mozambican YouTuber and daughter of DJ Damost.

== Career statistics ==
=== Club ===
As of match played 25 October 2026

Appearances and goals by club, season and competition
Club	Season	League			Taça de Portugal		Taça da Liga		Continental		Other		Total	
Club	Season	Division	Apps	Goals	Apps	Goals	Apps	Goals	Apps	Goals	Apps	Goals	Apps	Goals
Amora	2018–19	Campeonato de Portugal	4	1	—		—		—		—		4	1
Sporting CP B	2020–21	Campeonato de Portugal	17	0	—		—		—		—		17	0
Sporting CP B	2021–22	Liga 3	13	2	—		—		—		—		13	2
Sporting CP B	Total		30	2	—		—		—		—		30	2
Sporting CP	2021–22	Primeira Liga	1	0	0	0	0	0	0	0	0	0	1	0
Sporting CP	2023–24	Primeira Liga	27	5	6	1	1	0	7 (Note: Appearances in UEFA Europa League)	0	—		41	6
Sporting CP	2024–25	Primeira Liga	30	5	6	1	3	0	8 (Note: Appearances in UEFA Champions League)	1	1 (Note: Appearance in Supertaça Cândido de Oliveira)	0	48	7
Sporting CP	2025–26	Primeira Liga	29	6	6	1	0	0	11	1	1	0	46	8
Sporting CP	2026–27	Primeira Liga	9	1	0	0	0	0	3	1	0	0	12	2
Sporting CP	Total		97	17	18	3	4	0	29	3	2	0	150	23
Vitória SC (loan)	2021–22	Primeira Liga	10	0	0	0	0	0	—		—		10	0
Marítimo (loan)	2022–23	Primeira Liga	9	1	0	0	0	0	—		2 (Note: Appearances in Primeira Liga relegation play-offs)	0	11	1
Marítimo B (loan)	2022–23	Campeonato de Portugal	1	1	—		—		—		—		1	1
Career total			137	20	14	2	4	0	22	2	4	0	181	24

=== International ===
As of match played 25 September 2026

Appearances and goals by national team and year
National team	Year	Apps	Goals
Mozambique	2019	3	1
Mozambique	2020	3	0
Mozambique	2021	7	1
Mozambique	2022	4	1
Mozambique	2023	4	2
Mozambique	2024	10	4
Mozambique	2025	11	5
Mozambique	2026	2	1
Total		44	15

Scores and results list Mozambique's goal tally first.

List of international goals scored by Geny Catamo
No.	Date	Venue	Opponent	Score	Result	Competition
1.	10 September 2019	Zimpeto Stadium, Maputo, Mozambique	Mauritius	2–0	2–0	2022 FIFA World Cup qualification
2.	8 October 2021	Japoma Stadium, Douala, Cameroon	Cameroon	1–3	1–3	2022 FIFA World Cup qualification
3.	8 June 2022	L'Amitié Stadium, Cotonou, Benin	Benin	1–0	1–0	2023 Africa Cup of Nations qualification
4.	18 June 2023	Huye Stadium, Huye, Rwanda	Rwanda	1–0	2–0	2023 Africa Cup of Nations qualification
5.	13 October 2023	Estádio Municipal, Albufeira, Portugal	Angola	1–0	2–3	Friendly
6.	22 January 2024	Alassane Ouattara Stadium, Abidjan, Ivory Coast	Ghana	1–2	2–2	2023 Africa Cup of Nations
7.	10 June 2024	Ben M'Hamed El Abdi Stadium, El Jadida, Morocco	Guinea	1–0	1–0	2026 FIFA World Cup qualification
8.	6 September 2024	26 March Stadium, Bamako, Mali	Mali	1–0	1–1	2025 Africa Cup of Nations qualification
9.	14 October 2024	Mbombela Stadium, Mbombela, South Africa	Eswatini	3–0	3–0	2025 Africa Cup of Nations qualification
10.	25 March 2025	Hocine Aït Ahmed Stadium, Tizi Ouzou, Algeria	Algeria	1–3	1–5	2026 FIFA World Cup qualification
11.	14 October 2025	Miloud Hadefi Stadium, Oran, Algeria	Somalia	1–0	1–0	2026 FIFA World Cup qualification
12.	17 November 2025	Berrechid Municipal Stadium, Berrechid, Morocco	Chad	1–1	2–2	Friendly
13.	28 December 2025	Adrar Stadium, Agadir, Morocco	Gabon	2–0	3–2	2025 Africa Cup of Nations
14.	31 December 2025	Adrar Stadium, Agadir, Morocco	Cameroon	1–0	1–2	2025 Africa Cup of Nations
15.	25 September 2026	Zimpeto Stadium, Maputo, Mozambique	Senegal	1–1	1–1	2027 Africa Cup of Nations qualification

== Honours ==
Sporting CP

- Primeira Liga: 2023–24, 2024–25
- Taça de Portugal: 2024–25
