= Stanley Ratifo =

Mozambican footballer

Personal information
- Date of birth: 5 December 1994 (age 31)
- Place of birth: Halle/Saale, Germany
- Height: 1.90 m (6 ft 3 in)
- Position: Forward

Team information
- Current team: Hallescher FC
- Number: 30

Youth career
- –2011: 1. FC Lokomotive Leipzig

Senior career*
Years	Team	Apps	(Gls)
2011–2013	BSV Halle-Ammendorf	38	(5)
2013–2014	FC Pommern Greifswald	22	(5)
2014–2015	Hallescher FC II	25	(12)
2014	Hallescher FC	4	(0)
2015–2016	VfB Auerbach	48	(10)
2016–2018	1. FC Köln II	42	(6)
2018–2024	1. CfR Pforzheim	138	(31)
2024–2026	BSG Chemie Leipzig	64	(27)
2026–	Hallescher FC	10	(2)

International career^{‡}
2017–	Mozambique	49	(10)
- * Club domestic league appearances and goals as of 23 September 2026 ‡ National team caps and goals as of 17 November 2026

Stanley Ratifo (born 5 December 1994) is a professional footballer who plays as a forward for Hallescher FC. Born in Germany, he plays for the Mozambique national team.

== Club career ==
After playing for 1. FC Lokomotive Leipzig as a youth player and first steps at the senior level with BSV Halle-Ammendorf and FC Pommern Greifswald Ratifo made his debut at the professional level on 30 August 2014 with Hallescher FC in a 0–0-draw against Borussia Dortmund II in the 3. Liga. In the following years he played for VfB Auerbach and 1. FC Köln II in the 4th tier of German football. After he did not make the first team in Cologne Ratifo deliberately decided to play in a lower tier of German football to have more time to pursue a career as a musician in hip-hop and R&B. In 2018 he therefore joined 1. CfR Pforzheim in the Oberliga Baden-Württemberg. After six years in Pforzheim he went back to his native Leipzig and Halle area to play for Chemie Leipzig in 4th tier Regionalliga Nordost. In an interview he told fussball.de that he wanted to cut back on his music career for now to try and play at a higher level again.

== International career ==
Ratifo was born in Germany to a Mozambican father and German mother. He represents the Mozambique national team since 2017.

In 2024 he played at the 2023 Africa Cup of Nations.

Ratifo was part of the Mozambique squad at the 2025 Africa Cup of Nations in Morocco. Mozambique achieved their best-ever AFCON performance, securing their first-ever tournament win and reaching the round of 16 for the first time in history.

== Career statistics ==
Scores and results list Mozambique's goal tally first, score column indicates score after each Ratifo goal.

List of international goals scored by Stanley Ratifo
No.	Date	Venue	Opponent	Score	Result	Competition
1	10 June 2017	Levy Mwanawasa Stadium, Ndola, Zambia	Zambia	1–0	1–0	2019 Africa Cup of Nations qualification
2	23 March 2019	24 September Stadium, Bissau, Guinea-Bissau	Guinea-Bissau	1–1	2–2	2019 Africa Cup of Nations qualification
3	2 June 2022	FNB Stadium, Johannesburg, South Africa	Rwanda	1–1	1–1	2023 Africa Cup of Nations qualification
4	16 November 2023	Obed Itani Chilume Stadium, Francistown, Botswana	Botswana	2–0	3–2	2026 FIFA World Cup qualification
5	7 June 2024	Zimpeto Stadium, Maputo, Mozambique	Somalia	2–0	2–1	2026 FIFA World Cup qualification
6	11 October 2024	Zimpeto Stadium, Maputo, Mozambique	Eswatini	1–0	1–1	2025 Africa Cup of Nations qualification
7	14 October 2024	Mbombela Stadium, Mbombela, South Africa	Eswatini	2–0	3–0	2025 Africa Cup of Nations qualification
8	19 November 2024	24 September Stadium, Bissau, Guinea-Bissau	Guinea-Bissau	2–1	2–1	2025 Africa Cup of Nations qualification
9	20 March 2025	Cairo International Stadium, Cairo, Egypt	Uganda	3–1	3–1	2026 FIFA World Cup qualification
10	17 November 2026	Bahir Dar Stadium, Bahir Dar, Ethiopia	Ethiopia	1–0	1–0	2027 Africa Cup of Nations qualification

== Honours ==
Hallescher FC

- Saxony-Anhalt Cup: 2014–15
