= Witi =

Mozambican footballer (born 1996)

Personal information
- Full name: Witiness Chimoio João Quembo
- Date of birth: 26 August 1996 (age 30)
- Place of birth: Beira, Mozambique
- Height: 1.78 m (5 ft 10 in)
- Position: Winger

Team information
- Current team: FC Pyunik
- Number: 23

Youth career
- Liga Desportiva Muçulmana de Maputo
- 2014–2015: Nacional da Madeira
- 2015: Benfica

Senior career*
Years	Team	Apps	(Gls)
2015	Nacional da Madeira	1	(0)
2015–2024	Nacional da Madeira	201	(16)
2024	Dibba Al-Hisn	12	(0)
2024–2025	Al Orooba	8	(1)
2025–2026	Nacional da Madeira	26	(1)
2026–	FC Pyunik	2	(0)

International career^{‡}
2015–	Mozambique	56	(6)
- * Club domestic league appearances and goals as of 22 June 2026 ‡ National team caps and goals as of 29 September 2026

Witiness Chimoio João Quembo (born 26 August 1996), known as Witi, is a Mozambican professional footballer who plays as a winger for FC Pyunik and the Mozambique national team.

== Club career ==
Born in Beira, Witi began his career with Sporting Club da Beira. In the Summer of 2014, he moved to Portugal, joining the youth ranks of Nacional.

On 11 January 2015, Witi made his senior debut with Nacional in a home win against Boavista F.C., for Primeira Liga. Just three days later, he scored his first professional goal in a Taça da Liga match against Moreirense F.C. Later that month, Witi signed a deal with S.L. Benfica until the end of the season.

In June 2015, Witi returned to Nacional.

In 2024, Witi joined UAE Pro League clubs Dibba Al-Hisn and Al Orooba.

He then returned to Nacional on 25 July 2025, signing a two-season deal ahead of the 2025–26 season.

== International career ==
Witi made his debut for Mozambique in 2015, and represented the nation at the 2015 COSAFA Cup.

== Career statistics ==
Scores and results list Mozambique's goal tally first.

No.	Date	Venue	Opponent	Score	Result	Competition
1.	26 May 2019	King Zwelithini Stadium, Umlazi, South Africa	Namibia	1–1	1–2	2019 COSAFA Cup
2.	18 November 2019	Estádio Nacional de Cabo Verde, Praia, Cape Verde	Cape Verde	2–2	2–2	2021 Africa Cup of Nations qualification
3.	9 September 2023	Zimpeto Stadium, Maputo, Mozambique	Benin	1–1	3–2	2023 Africa Cup of Nations qualification
4.	14 January 2024	Felix Houphouet Boigny Stadium, Abidjan, Ivory Coast	Egypt	1–1	2–2	2023 Africa Cup of Nations
5.	8 September 2025	Zimpeto Stadium, Maputo, Mozambique	Botswana	1–0	2–0	2026 FIFA World Cup qualification
6.	29 September 2026	Zimpeto Stadium, Maputo, Mozambique	Sudan	1–0	4–1	2027 Africa Cup of Nations qualification

== Honors ==
Mozambique

- COSAFA Cup runner-up:2015
