= Sak Hassan =

Somali footballer (born 2001)

Sak Hassan Sak Xasan
Personal information
- Full name: Sakariya Abdi Hassan
- Date of birth: 21 March 2001 (age 25)
- Place of birth: Netherlands
- Position: Midfielder

Team information
- Current team: Dover Athletic

Youth career
- Leyton Orient
- Queens Park Rangers
- Tottenham Hotspur
- 2018–2019: Saffron Walden Town

Senior career*
Years	Team	Apps	(Gls)
2019	Springfield	6	(1)
2019–2021	Hornchurch	2	(0)
2020	→ Tower Hamlets (loan)	4	(0)
2021	→ Redbridge (loan)	3	(0)
2021	Barking	4	(1)
2021–2023	AFC Sudbury	48	(11)
2023–2025	Hashtag United	72	(16)
2025–2026	Wealdstone	24	(1)
2026	Hampton & Richmond Borough	8	(0)
2026–	Dover Athletic	5	(1)

International career^{‡}
2022–	Somalia	16	(2)
- * Club domestic league appearances and goals as of 8 November 2026 ‡ National team caps and goals as of 2 October 2026

Sakariya Abdi Hassan (Somali: Sakariya Cabdi Xasan; born 21 March 2001) is a footballer who last plays as a midfielder for National League South club Dover Athletic. Born in the Netherlands, he represents Somalia at international level.

== Club career ==
Born in the Netherlands, Hassan moved to England at the age of 8. He played youth football for Leyton Orient, Queens Park Rangers, Tottenham Hotspur and Saffron Walden Town.

Hassan began his career with Chelmsford-based club Springfield in 2019, making six Essex Olympian League appearances for the club, scoring once. Later that year, Hassan signed for Hornchurch. He was an unused substitute in Hornchurch's victory over Hereford in the 2021 FA Trophy Final. During the 2020–21 season, Hassan was loaned to Tower Hamlets, making four appearances. In September 2021, Hassan joined Redbridge on loan for a month, before signing for Barking in October 2021.

In December 2021, Hassan joined AFC Sudbury. On 28 June 2023, he joined seventh tier Isthmian League side Hashtag United. At the end of the 2024–25 season, after 90 league appearances and 22 goals for the club, it was announced that Hassan would leave the club.

On 16 June 2025, Hassan signed for National League side Wealdstone. On 25 October 2025, Hassan scored his first league goal for Wealdstone, as well as recording three assists, in Wealdstone's 4–2 win against Sutton United. In March 2026, Wealdstone announced that Hassan would not feature for the rest of the season, after taking part in the indoor six-a-side tournament Baller League for Prime FC, in breach of his contract.

In July 2026, Hassan signed for National League South side Hampton & Richmond Borough. On 9 September 2026, Hassan announced he had left Hampton & Richmond.

On 12 September 2026, Hassan joined Dover Athletic.

== International career ==
Sak was playing for non-league side Sudbury when he got a surprise cal-up to the Somalia national football team and on 23 March 2022, Hassan made his debut for the Ocean Stars in a 3–0 loss against Eswatini in the qualification for the 2023 Africa Cup of Nations. Four days later, on 27 March 2022, Hassan scored his first goal for Somalia in a 2–1 loss against Eswatini at the Mbombela Stadium.

== Career statistics ==
=== International ===
As of match played 31 March 2026

Appearances and goals by national team and year
National team	Year	Apps	Goals
Somalia	2022	2	1
Somalia	2023	4	0
Somalia	2024	4	1
Somalia	2025	3	0
Somalia	2026	2	0
Total		15	2

As of match played 10 June 2024
Somalia score listed first, score column indicates score after each Hassan goal

List of international goals scored by Sak Hassan
No.	Date	Venue	Opponent	Score	Result	Competition	Ref.
1	27 March 2022	Mbombela Stadium, Mbombela, South Africa	Eswatini	1–2	1–2	2023 Africa Cup of Nations qualification	
2	10 June 2024	Estádio do Zimpeto, Maputo, Mozambique	Botswana	1–3	1–3	2026 FIFA World Cup qualification	
