= 2023 Africa Cup of Nations qualification Group J =

Association football tournament group

Group J of the 2023 Africa Cup of Nations qualification tournament was one of the twelve groups that decided the teams which qualified for the 2023 Africa Cup of Nations finals tournament. The group consisted of four teams: Tunisia, Equatorial Guinea, Libya and Botswana.

The teams played against each other in a home-and-away round-robin format between 1 June 2022 and 7 September 2023.

Tunisia and Equatorial Guinea, the group winners and runners-up respectively, qualified for the 2023 Africa Cup of Nations.

== Standings ==
Pos	Team	Pld	W	D	L	GF	GA	GD	Pts	Qualification	Tunisia	Equatorial Guinea	Botswana	Libya
1	Tunisia	6	4	1	1	11	1	+10	13	Final tournament	—	4–0	3–0	3–0
2	Equatorial Guinea	6	4	1	1	9	7	+2	13	Final tournament	1–0	—	2–0	2–0
3	Botswana	6	1	1	4	3	9	−6	4		0–0	2–3	—	1–0
4	Libya	6	1	1	4	2	8	−6	4		0–1	1–1	1–0	—

Source: CAF
Rules for classification: Tiebreakers

== Matches ==
1 June 2022
18:00 UTC+2

Libya	1–0	Botswana
Al Taher 54'	Report

Benina Martyrs Stadium, Benghazi
Referee: Sekou Ahmed Toure (Guinea)
2 June 2022
20:00 UTC+1

Tunisia	4–0	Equatorial Guinea
Sliti 56'; Jaziri 77'; Msakni 80', 85'	Report

Stade Hammadi Agrebi, Tunis
Referee: Pacifique Ndabihawenimana (Burundi)

5 June 2022
15:00 UTC+2

Botswana	0–0	Tunisia
	Report

Obed Itani Chilume Stadium, Francistown
Referee: Mohamed Athoumani (Comoros)
6 June 2022
20:00 UTC+1

Equatorial Guinea	2–0	Libya
Al Tuhami 51' (o.g.); Bikoro 83' (pen.)	Report

Estadio de Malabo, Malabo
Referee: Blaise Yuven Ngwa (Cameroon)

24 March 2023
20:00 UTC+1

Equatorial Guinea	2–0	Botswana
Coco 20'; Bikoro 66'	Report

Estadio de Malabo, Malabo
Referee: Adalbert Diouf (Senegal)
24 March 2023
21:30 UTC+1

Tunisia	3–0	Libya
Msakni 12'; Maâloul 21' (pen.); Jouini 86'	Report

Stade Hammadi Agrebi, Tunis
Referee: Mustapha Ghorbal (Algeria)

28 March 2023
15:00 UTC+2

Botswana	2–3	Equatorial Guinea
Elias 28'; Seakanyeng 66' (pen.)	Report	E. Nsue 13'; Ditsele 40' (o.g.); Salvador 51'

Obed Itani Chilume Stadium, Francistown
Referee: Mohamed Diraneh Guedi (Djibouti)
28 March 2023
22:00 UTC+2

Libya	0–1	Tunisia
	Report	Jouini 16'

Benina Martyrs Stadium, Benghazi
Referee: Amin Omar (Egypt)

17 June 2023
16:00 UTC+1

Equatorial Guinea	1–0	Tunisia
E. Nsue 85' (pen.)	Report

Estadio de Malabo, Malabo
Referee: Ibrahim Kalilou Traore (Ivory Coast)
17 June 2023
18:00 UTC+2

Botswana	1–0	Libya
Mohutsiwa 45'	Report

Obed Itani Chilume Stadium, Francistown
Referee: Samuel Uwikunda (Rwanda)

6 September 2023
21:00 UTC+2

Libya	1–1	Equatorial Guinea
Taqtaq 80'	Report	Elo 62'

Benina Martyrs Stadium, Benghazi
Referee: Alhadi Allaou Mahamat (Chad)
7 September 2023
20:00 UTC+1

Tunisia	3–0	Botswana
Velaphi 60' (o.g.); Msakni 82', 90+3'	Report

Stade Hammadi Agrebi, Tunis
Referee: Issa Sy (Senegal)

== Goalscorers ==
There were 25 goals scored in 12 matches, for an average of 2.08 goals per match.

5 goals

- (Tunisia) Youssef Msakni

2 goals

- (Equatorial Guinea) Federico Bikoro
- (Equatorial Guinea) Emilio Nsue
- (Tunisia) Haythem Jouini

1 goal

- (Botswana) Mbatshi Elias
- (Botswana) Gape Mohutsiwa
- (Botswana) Kabelo Seakanyeng
- (Equatorial Guinea) Saúl Coco
- (Equatorial Guinea) José Elo
- (Equatorial Guinea) Iban Salvador
- (Libya) Saleh Al Taher
- (Libya) Husain Taqtaq
- (Tunisia) Seifeddine Jaziri
- (Tunisia) Ali Maâloul
- (Tunisia) Naïm Sliti

1 own goal

- (Botswana) Lebogang Ditsele (against Equatorial Guinea)
- (Botswana) Alford Velaphi (against Tunisia)
- (Libya) Mohammed Al Tuhami (against Equatorial Guinea)
