= Mothusi Johnson =

Motswana footballer

Personal information
- Date of birth: 28 July 1997 (age 29)
- Place of birth: Gaborone, Botswana
- Height: 1.70 m (5 ft 7 in)
- Position: Left back

Team information
- Current team: Orapa United

Senior career*
Years	Team	Apps	(Gls)
2016–2017	TAFIC		
2017–2018	Gaborone United		
2018–	Orapa United		

International career^{‡}
2019–	Botswana	38	(1)
- * Club domestic league appearances and goals as of 19:25, 25 March 2025 (UTC) ‡ National team caps and goals as of 19:25, 28 July 2026 (UTC)

Mothusi Johnson (born 28 July 1997) is a Motswana international footballer who plays for Orapa United as a left back.

== Career ==
Born in Gaborone, Johnson has played club football for TAFIC, Gaborone United and Orapa United.

He made his international debut for Botswana in 2019. In November 2019 he was one of four Botswana international players dropped from the national team after they had been drinking alcohol.

== Career statistics ==
=== International ===
As of match played 30 December 2025

Appearances and goals by national team and year
National team	Year	Apps	Goals
Botswana	2019	8	0
Botswana	2020	–	
Botswana	2021	4	0
Botswana	2022	7	0
Botswana	2023	3	0
Botswana	2024	5	0
Botswana	2025	11	1
Total		38	1

Scores and results list Botswana's goal tally first, score column indicates score after each Johnson goal.

List of international goals scored by Mothusi Johnson
No.	Date	Venue	Opponent	Score	Result	Competition
1	25 March 2025	Obed Itani Chilume Stadium, Francistown, Botswana	Somalia	2–0	2–0	2026 FIFA World Cup qualification
