= Yusuf Ahmed =

Somali footballer (born 1997)

Personal information
- Date of birth: 24 April 1997 (age 29)
- Height: 1.84 m (6 ft 1/2 in)
- Position: Forward

Team information
- Current team: Avondale
- Number: 11

Youth career
- 2015–2018: Melbourne City

Senior career*
Years	Team	Apps	(Gls)
2015	Dandenong Thunder	23	(11)
2016–2018	Melbourne City NPL	56	(20)
2019–	Avondale	93	(26)

International career^{‡}
2023–	Somalia	3	(1)
- * Club domestic league appearances and goals as of 10 September 2023 ‡ National team caps and goals as of 22 November 2023

Yusuf Ahmed (born 24 April 1997) is a Somali professional footballer who plays as a forward for National Premier Leagues Victoria club Avondale and the Somalia national team. A former youth player of Melbourne City, he was named on the city's Rising Star award in 2018.

== International career ==
Ahmed received his first international call-up for the Somali national team ahead of the 2026 World Cup qualifiers scheduled in November 2023. The Somali Football Federation first took notice of Ahmed earlier that period after a relative notified a federation member.

Ahmed made his competitive international debut on 16 November 2023 in a 3–1 defeat to Algeria at Nelson Mandela Stadium. He scored Somalia's only goal in the 65th-minute of the match, which was the country's fourth goal in their World Cup qualifying history.

== Career statistics ==
=== Club ===
As of match played 10 September 2023

Appearances and goals by club, season and competition
Club	Season	League			Australia Cup		Continental		Other		Total	
Club	Season	Division	Apps	Goals	Apps	Goals	Apps	Goals	Apps	Goals	Apps	Goals
Heidelberg Stars SC	2014	State League 2 North-West	—	4	—		—		—		–	4
Dandenong Thunder	2015	NPL Victoria	23	11	—		—		—		23	11
Dandenong Thunder	Total		23	15	0	0	0	0	0	0	23	15
Melbourne City	2016	NPL Victoria 2 West/East	28	9	—		—		—		28	9
Melbourne City	2017	NPL Victoria 2 West/East	3	0	—		—		—		3	0
Melbourne City	2018	NPL Victoria 2 West/East	25	11	—		—		—		25	11
Melbourne City	Total		56	20	0	0	0	0	0	0	56	20
Avondale	2019	NPL Victoria	27	6	—		—		—		27	6
Avondale	2020	NPL Victoria	5	2	—		—		—		5	2
Avondale	2021	NPL Victoria	17	5	—		—		—		17	5
Avondale	2022	NPL Victoria	19	2	1	0	—		—		20	2
Avondale	2023	NPL Victoria	25	11	—		—		—		25	11
Avondale	Total		93	26	1	0	0	0	0	0	94	26
Career total			172	61	1	0	0	0	0	0	173	61

=== International ===
As of match played 22 November 2023

Appearances and goals by national team and year
National team	Year	Apps	Goals
Somalia	2023	3	1
Total		3	1

List of international goals scored by Yusuf Ahmed
No.	Date	Venue	Cap	Opponent	Score	Result	Competition
1	16 November 2023	Nelson Mandela Stadium, Algiers, Algeria	2	Algeria	1–2	1–3	2026 FIFA World Cup qualification
