= Segolame Boy =

Motswana footballer (born 1992)

Personal information
- Full name: Segolame Boy
- Date of birth: 7 November 1992 (age 34)
- Place of birth: Serowe, Botswana
- Height: 1.76 m (5 ft 9 1/2 in)
- Positions: Attacking midfielder; winger

Team information
- Current team: Sua Flamingos
- Number: 11

Senior career*
Years	Team	Apps	(Gls)
2012–2014	Miscellaneous		
2014–	Township Rollers		

International career
2014–	Botswana	47	(5)
- * Club domestic league appearances and goals

Segolame Boy (born 7 November 1992) is a Motswana footballer who plays as a midfielder for Township Rollers in the Botswana Premier League.

Segolame Boy was first spotted representing a Selibe-Phikwe local side in the constituency tournaments, the lowest level of Botswana football. Having impressed talent scouts, he was signed by Serowe-based club Miscellaneous and would spend two seasons with them plying his trade in the Botswana Premier League. In 2014 he moved to Premier League giants Township Rollers and quickly became a mainstay in their first eleven, even attracting attention from the more lucrative South African Premier Division. In just five years with the Gaborone club Boy won four Premier League titles, a Mascom Top 8 Cup, and was part of the history-making Rollers squad which played in the 2018 CAF Champions League group stage, cementing his name in Rollers folklore.

== International career ==
Boy made his Botswana debut aged 21 in 2014 under then coach Peter Butler (footballer, born 1966). Deployed as an attacking midfielder behind the strikers, he played the entire game as the Zebras lost 2–0 to Senegal in a 2015 AFCON qualifier.

== Career statistics ==
=== International ===
Appearances and goals by national team and year
National team	Year	Apps	Goals
Botswana	2014	6	0
Botswana	2015	10	1
Botswana	2016	3	0
Botswana	2017	3	0
Botswana	2018	3	0
Botswana	2019	8	3
Botswana	2021	4	0
Botswana	2023	1	0
Botswana	2024	5	0
Botswana	2025	4	1
Total		47	5

Scores and results list Botswana's goal tally first, score column indicates score after each Boy goal.

List of international goals scored by Segolame Boy
No.	Date	Venue	Opponent	Score	Result	Competition	Ref.
1	30 May 2015	Moruleng Stadium, Saulspoort, South Africa	Madagascar	1–2	1–2	2015 COSAFA Cup	
2	20 April 2019	Lobatse Stadium, Lobatse, Botswana	Seychelles	2–0	2–0	2020 African Nations Championship qualification	
3	5 June 2020	Moses Mabhida Stadium, Durban, South Africa	Lesotho	2–0	2–1	2019 COSAFA Cup	
4	3 August 2019	National Heroes Stadium, Lusaka, Zambia	Zambia	2–1	2–3	2020 African Nations Championship qualification	
5	14 October 2025	Stade Mohammed V, Casablanca, Morocco	Guinea	1–0	2–2	2026 FIFA World Cup qualification	

== Honours ==
=== Club ===
Township Rollers

- Botswana Premier League: 2015–16, 2016–17, 2017–18, 2018–19
- Mascom Top 8 Cup: 2017–18

=== Individual ===
- FUB Team of the Year: 2016
