= Jonathan Muiomo =

Mozambican footballer

Personal information
- Full name: Eùsebio Chilepfane Jonathan Muiomo
- Date of birth: 28 January 1999 (age 27)
- Place of birth: Leipzig, Germany
- Height: 1.85 m (6 ft 1 in)
- Position: Winger

Youth career
- SV 09 Flörsheim
- Eddersheim
- 2012–2017: Wehen Wiesbaden
- 2017–2018: Greuther Fürth

Senior career*
Years	Team	Apps	(Gls)
2018–2019	Greuther Fürth II	10	(0)
2019–2022	Optik Rathenow	50	(13)
2022–2024	Carl Zeiss Jena	48	(9)
2024	SSVg Velbert	6	(0)
2024	FV Illertissen	0	(0)
2024–2025	FC Wiltz 71	2	(0)

International career^{‡}
2023–	Mozambique	4	(1)
- * Club domestic league appearances and goals as of 16 October 2024 ‡ National team caps and goals as of 22:39, 19 November 2023 (UTC)

Eùsebio Chilepfane Jonathan "Jonny" Muiomo (born 28 January 1999) is a professional footballer who plays as a winger. Born in Germany, he plays for the Mozambique national team.

== Club career ==
Muiomo is a youth product of SV 09 Flörsheim, Eddersheim, Wehen Wiesbaden, and Greuther Fürth. He began his senior career with Greuther Fürth II in the Regionalliga in 2019. In 2019, he moved to Optik Rathenow where he played for three seasons. On 10 June 2022, he moved to Carl Zeiss Jena.

== International career ==
Born in Germany, Muiomo was born to a Mozambican father and German mother. He was called up to the Mozambique national team for a set of friendly matches in October 2023.

== Personal life ==
Muiomo's first name is inspired by the Mozambican-born footballer Eusébio. Outside of football he is a tattoo artist, who paints tattoos on himself.
