= Mosha Gaolaolwe =

Motswana footballer

Personal information
- Full name: Mosha Gaolaolwe
- Date of birth: 25 December 1993 (age 32)
- Place of birth: Lobatse, Botswana
- Height: 1.75 m (5 ft 9 in)
- Position: Centre-back

Senior career*
Years	Team	Apps	(Gls)
2013–2014	Gilport Lions		
2014–2016	BDF XI		
2016–2019	Township Rollers		
2019–2020	TS Galaxy	10	(1)
2020–2026	Township Rollers		

International career^{‡}
2013–	Botswana	96	(2)
- * Club domestic league appearances and goals ‡ National team caps and goals as of 21:00, 30 December 2025 (UTC)

Mosha Gaolaolwe (born 25 December 1993) is a Motswana footballer playing as a centreback. He is also a full Botswana international.

== Honours ==
=== Club ===
Township Rollers

- Botswana Premier League: 3

2016–17, 2017–18, 2018–19

- Mascom Top 8 Cup: 1

2017–18

=== Individual ===
- FUB Team of the Year: 2017
