= Muhammad Shaban =

Ugandan footballer (born 1998)

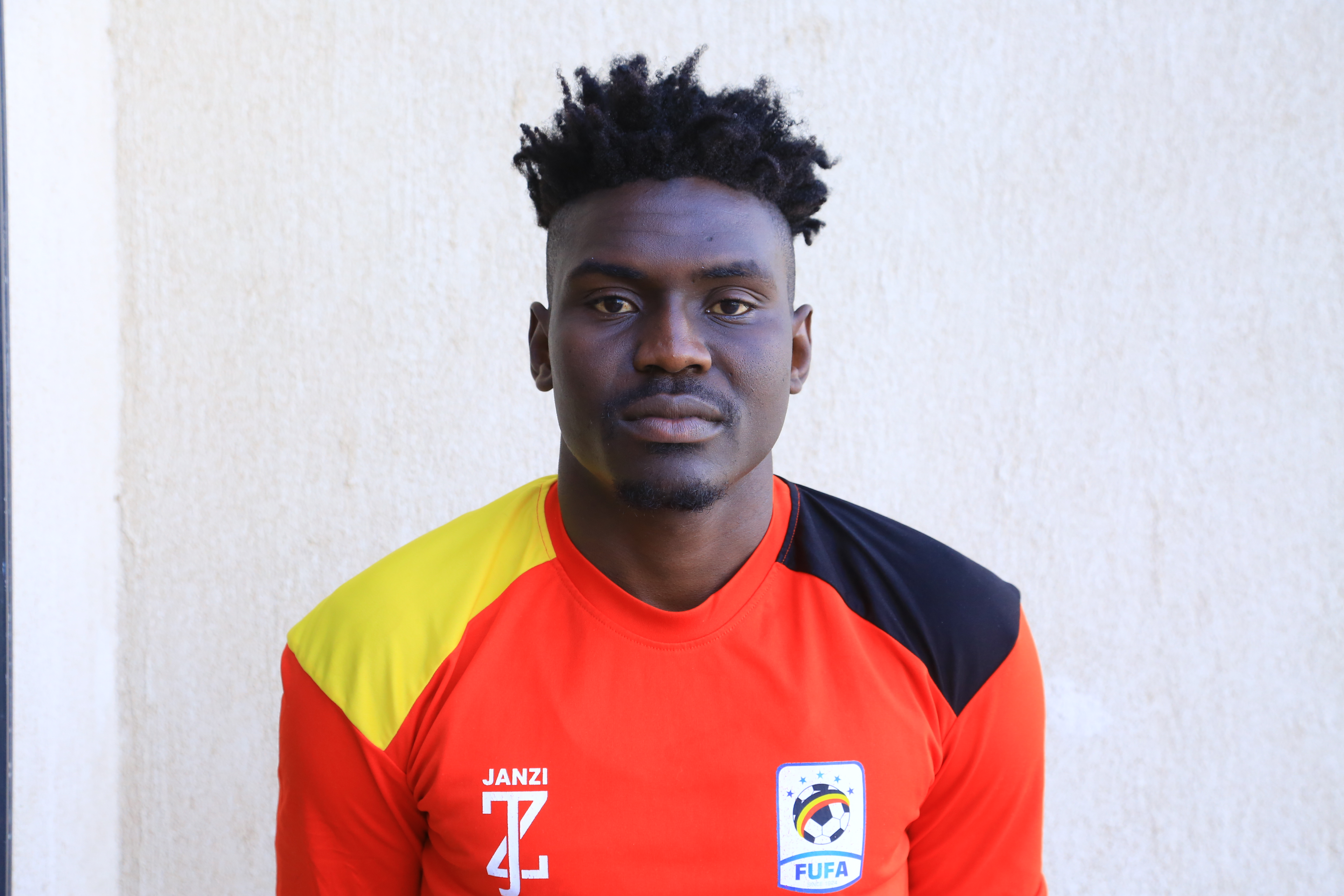
- Muhammad Shaban in 2025

Personal information
- Date of birth: 11 January 1998 (age 28)
- Place of birth: Arua, Uganda
- Height: 1.65 m (5 ft 5 in)
- Position: Striker

Team information
- Current team: Nairobi United

Senior career*
Years	Team	Apps	(Gls)
2015	Vipers		
2015–2017	Onduparaka		
2017–2018	Kampala Capital City Authority		
2018–2019	Raja Casablanca	5	(0)
2019–2021	Vipers	5	(0)
2021–2022	Onduparaka		
2022–2025	Kampala Capital City Authority		
2025	Al-Anwar		
2025-2026	Ethiopian Coffee		
2026	Kitara		
2026–	Nairobi United		

International career^{‡}
2016–	Uganda	26	(3)
- * Club domestic league appearances and goals as of 09:06, 11 November 2023 (UTC) ‡ National team caps and goals as of 16:00, 20 March 2025 (UTC)

Muhammad Shaban (born 11 January 1998) is a Ugandan professional footballer who plays as a striker for Kenya Premier League club Nairobi United and the Uganda national team.

== Club career ==
Born in Arua, Shaban signed a contract with Vipers in 2015, but it was rendered void and he signed for Onduparaka instead. He signed a three-year contract with Kampala Capital City Authority in October 2017, scoring on his debut a month later. In August 2018 he was linked with transfer to South African club Orlando Pirates and Moroccan club Raja Casablanca. He signed for Raja Casablanca for the 2018–19 season, making 5 league appearances, before returning to Vipers in August 2019.

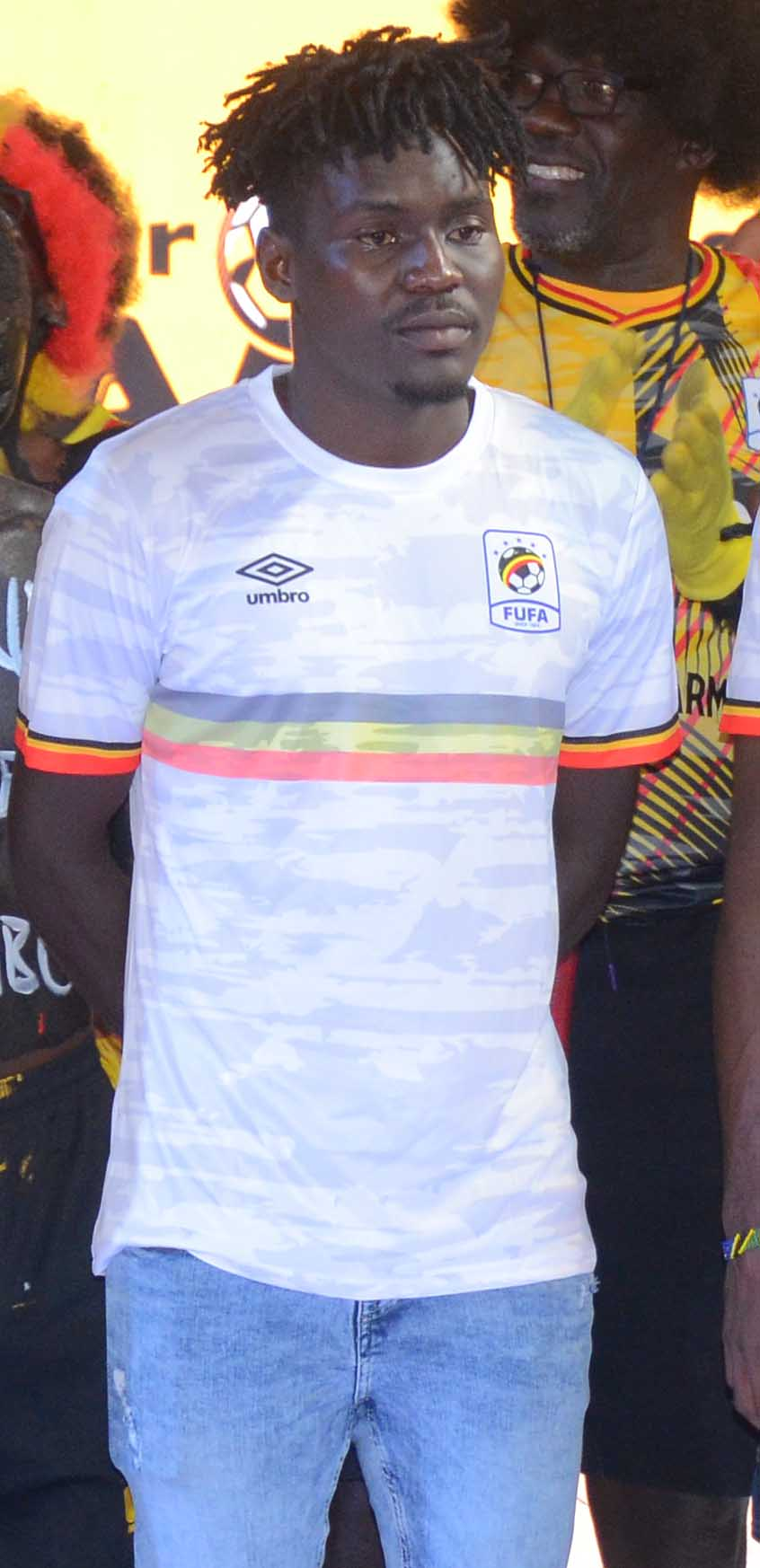

He re-signed for Onduparaka in October 2021, and Kampala Capital City Authority in August 2022.

He signed for Libyan Premier League club Al-Anwar in February 2025.

In October 2025, Shaban joined Ethiopian Premier League club Ethiopian Coffee on a one-year contract.

Shaban joined Uganda Premier League club Kitara in February 2026 on a two-year contract. He left Kitara 5 months into his contract.

In August 2026, he joined Nairobi United in the Kenyan Premier League.

== International career ==
He made his international debut in 2016, and was named in the squad for the 2017 Africa Cup of Nations.

== Honours ==
Individual

- 2016 FUFA Footballer of the Year
