= Alfons Amade =

Footballer (born 1999)

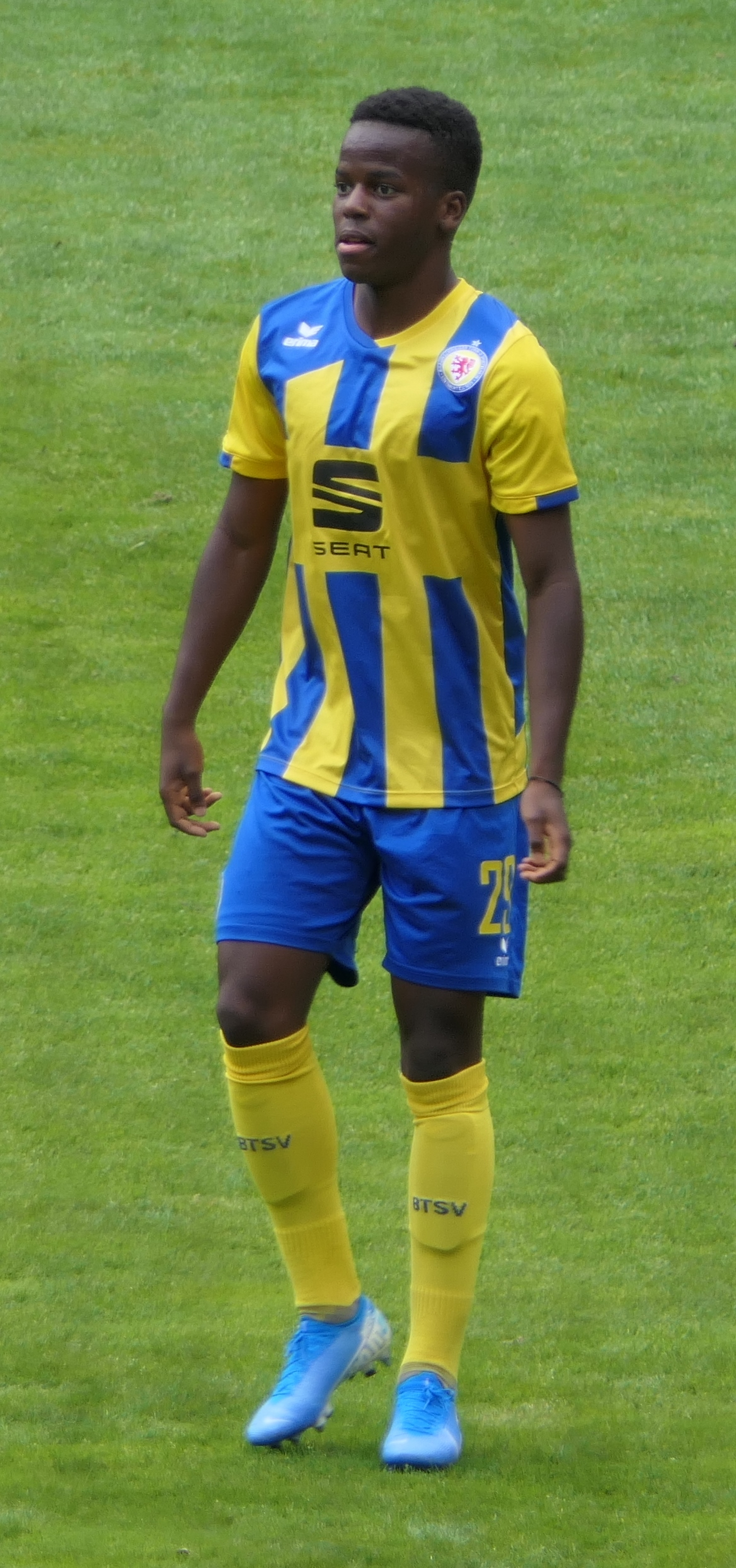
- Amade with Eintracht Braunschweig in 2019

Personal information
- Full name: Alfons Antonio Chico Amade
- Date of birth: 12 November 1999 (age 26)
- Place of birth: Heidelberg, Germany
- Height: 1.70 m (5 ft 7 in)
- Position: Right back

Team information
- Current team: Dunfermline Athletic
- Number: 14

Youth career
- SSV Vogelstang
- –2010: Waldhof Mannheim
- 2010–2018: TSG Hoffenheim

Senior career*
Years	Team	Apps	(Gls)
2018–2021	TSG Hoffenheim II	54	(5)
2018–2021	TSG Hoffenheim	1	(0)
2019–2020	→ Eintracht Braunschweig (loan)	4	(0)
2021–2024	Oostende	55	(2)
2024–2025	Septemvri Sofia	21	(2)
2025–	Dunfermline Athletic	28	(0)

International career^{‡}
2013–2014	Germany U15	3	(0)
2014–2015	Germany U16	8	(0)
2015–2016	Germany U17	11	(1)
2017	Germany U18	3	(0)
2017–2018	Germany U19	5	(1)
2018–2019	Germany U20	10	(1)
2024–	Mozambique	21	(2)
- * Club domestic league appearances and goals as of 4 May 2026 ‡ National team caps and goals as of 19 January 2026

Alfons Antonio Chico Amade (born 12 November 1999) is a professional footballer who plays as a right-back for Dunfermline Athletic. Born in Germany, he represents the Mozambique national team.

== Club career ==
Amade made his professional debut for TSG Hoffenheim in the Bundesliga on 2 March 2019, coming on as a substitute in the 82nd minute for Nadiem Amiri in the match against Eintracht Frankfurt, which finished as a 2–3 away loss.

In July 2025, Amade signed for Scottish Championship side Dunfermline Athletic on a two-year deal. He was the first signing to move to the Scottish club from their affiliate team Septemvri Sofia in Bulgaria.

== International career ==
Born in Germany, Amade is of Mozambican descent. He is a former youth international for Germany.

In December 2023, Amade was called up by the Mozambique national team for the 2023 Africa Cup of Nations.

== Career statistics ==
=== Club ===
As of match played 17 February 2026

Appearances and goals by club, season and competition
Club	Season	League			National cup (Note: Includes DFB-Pokal, Belgian Cup, Bulgarian Cup and Scottish Cup)		League cup (Note: Includes Scottish League Cup)		Other		Total	
Club	Season	Division	Apps	Goals	Apps	Goals	Apps	Goals	Apps	Goals	Apps	Goals
TSG Hoffenheim II	2018–19	Regionalliga Südwest	19	1	—		—		—		19	1
TSG Hoffenheim II	2020–21	Regionalliga Südwest	35	4	—		—		—		35	4
TSG Hoffenheim II	Total		54	5	—		—		—		54	5
TSG Hoffenheim	2018–19	Bundesliga	1	0	0	0	—		0	0	1	0
TSG Hoffenheim	2019–20	Bundesliga	0	0	0	0	—		—		0	0
TSG Hoffenheim	2020–21	Bundesliga	0	0	0	0	—		1 (Note: Appearance(s) in UEFA Europa League)	0	1	0
TSG Hoffenheim	Total		1	0	0	0	—		1	0	2	0
Eintracht Braunschweig (loan)	2019–20	3. Liga	4	0	—		—		—		4	0
Oostende	2021–22	Belgian Pro League	18	2	1	0	—		—		19	2
Oostende	2022–23	Belgian Pro League	20	0	1	0	—		—		21	0
Oostende	2023–24	Challenger Pro League	16	0	3	0	—		—		19	0
Oostende	Total		54	2	5	0	—		—		59	2
Septemvri Sofia	2024–25	Bulgarian First League	21	2	0	0	—		—		21	2
Dunfermline Athletic	2025–26	Scottish Championship	16	0	2	0	3	0	0	0	21	0
Career total			150	9	7	0	3	0	1	0	161	9

=== International ===
As of match played 5 January 2026

Appearances and goals by national team and year
National team	Year	Apps	Goals
Mozambique	2024	11	2
Mozambique	2025	9	0
Mozambique	2026	1	0
Total		21	2

Scores and results list Mozambique's goal tally first, score column indicates score after each Amade goal.

List of international goals scored by Alfons Amade
No.	Date	Venue	Opponent	Score	Result	Competition	Ref.
1	8 January 2024	FNB Stadium, Johannesburg, South Africa	Botswana	1–1	1–1	Friendly	
2	7 June 2024	Estádio do Zimpeto, Maputo, Mozambique	Somalia	1–0	2–1	2026 FIFA World Cup qualification	
