= Obed Itani Chilume Stadium =

Sports venue in Francistown, Botswana

Coordinates: 21.160261°S 27.498565°E

- Francistown Sports Complex
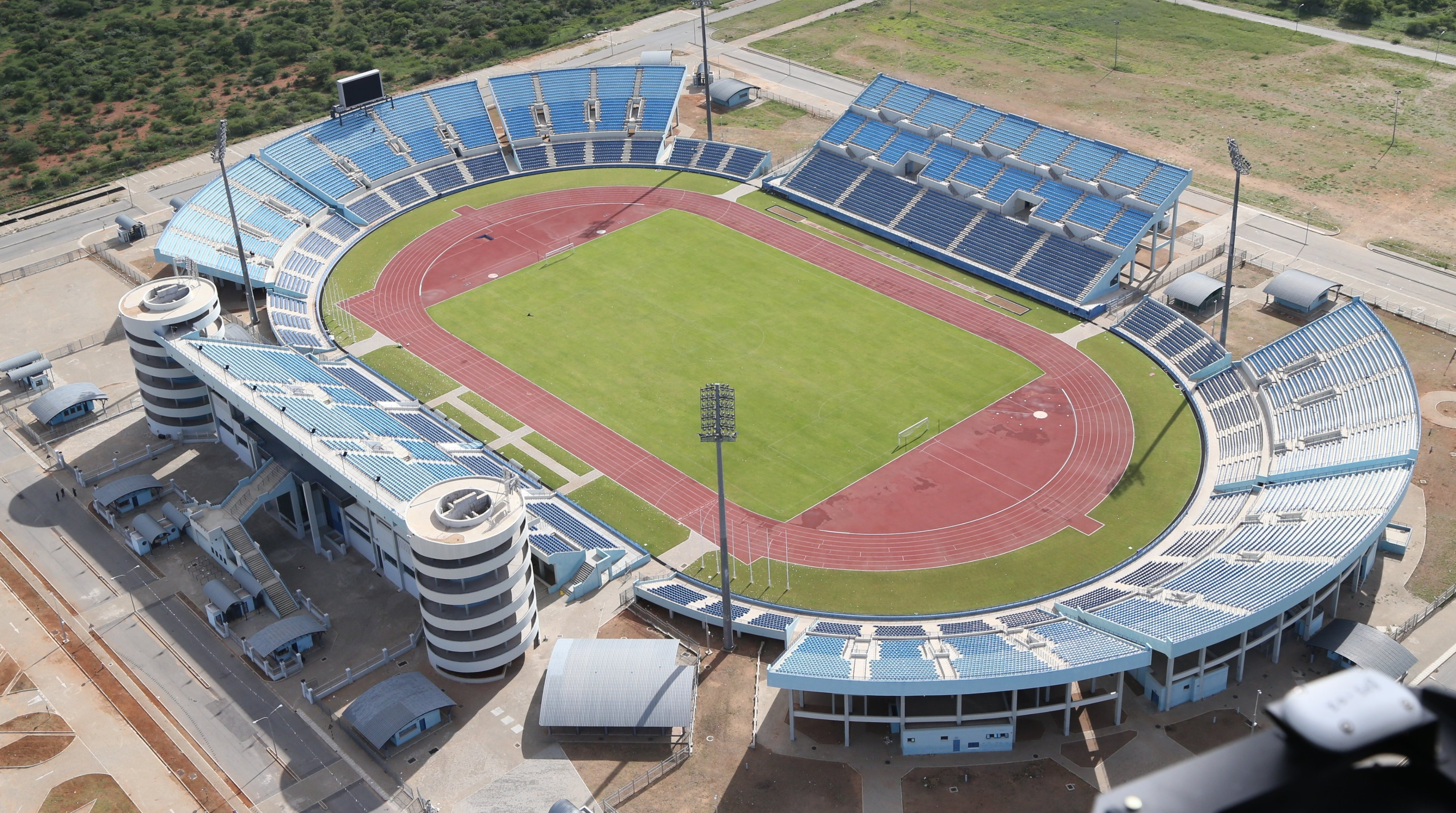
- The stadium in 2020
- Interactive map of Obed Itani Chilume Stadium
- Capacity: 26,000

Construction
- Groundbreaking: 2008
- Opened: 2015

Tenants
- TAFIC F.C. ECCO City Green; Botswana national football team

Obed Itani Chilume Stadium (previously known as Francistown Sports Complex) is a multi-use stadium in Francistown, Botswana.

It is used mostly for football matches and usually hosts the home matches of Francistown-based TAFIC F.C. The stadium can accommodate 26,000 spectators, making it the largest stadium in the country. It was officially opened in 2015, five years behind schedule. Due to delays, the stadium could not be completed in time for the 2010 World Cup as initially planned. Originally called the Francistown Sports Complex, it was renamed as Obed Itani Chilume Stadium in October 2019.

The stadium also hosts athletics meets for local high schools, as well as national trials and competitions.
