= Zimpeto Stadium =

Sports stadium in Mozambique, Africa

- Interactive map of Zimpeto Stadium
- Full name: Zimpeto National Stadium
- Location: Maputo, Mozambique
- Coordinates: 25.828°S 32.575°E
- Capacity: 42,000
- Surface: Grass

Construction
- Groundbreaking: 2008
- Built: 2008-2011
- Opened: 2011
- Cost: USD 65 million
- Architect: Anhui Foreign Economic Construction Group

Tenant
- Mozambique national football team (2011–present)

Zimpeto Stadium is a multi-use stadium in Zimpeto — an outlying neighborhood of Maputo, Mozambique, which was inaugurated on 23 April 2011. It is mainly used for football and was the main stadium for the 2011 All-Africa Games and 2017 Lusophony Games. It has a capacity of 42,000 spectators. The stadium was built with funds from the Chinese government.

It was constructed by Chinese company Anhui Foreign Economic Construction Group.
