= 2017 Moçambola =

Moçambola
- Season: 2017
- Champions: Songo
- Relegated: Chingale de Tete; UP de Lichinga; Macuácua
- Matches: 85
- Goals: 161 (1.89 per match)
- Biggest home win: 3 matches: 1º de Maio 4-0 Textáfrica (2 April 2017); Ferroviário Nampula 4-0 1º de Maio (11 April 2017); LD Maputo 4-0 Chingale de Tete (30 April 2017)
- Biggest away win: 4 matches: Chingale de Tete 0-2 Costa do Sol (2 April 2017); Desportivo Nacala 0-2 UP de Lichinga (2 April 2017); Macuácua 0-2 Maxaquene (2 April 2017); Macuácua 0-2 Costa do Sol (12 April 2017)
- Highest scoring: 2 matches: LD Maputo 4-2 Ferroviário Nampula (15 April 2017); Songo 4-2 Vilankulo (7 May 2017)
- Longest winning run: Costa do Sol (4)
- Longest unbeaten run: LD Maputo (9)
- Longest winless run: Macuácua (12)
- Longest losing run: Maxaquene; UP de Lichinga (3)
- All statistics correct as of 14 May 2017.

The 2017 Moçambola is the 40th season of top-tier football in Mozambique. The season began on 4 March 2017. Ferroviário Beira are the defending champions coming off their first league title (they had won two colonial championships prior to independence).

== Teams ==
The league is made up of 16 teams with Lichinga, Macuácua and Textáfrica being promoted from regional groups and Desportivo Maputo, Desportivo Niassa and Estrela Vermelha Maputo relegated after finishing in the bottom three spots of the standings in 2016.

Team	Home city	Stadium	Capacity	2016 season
1º de Maio de Quelimane	Quelimane	Estádio 1º de Maio	8,000	13th in Moçambola
FC Chibuto	Chibuto	Campo do Chibuto	2,000	3rd in Moçambola
CD Chingale	Tete	Estádio do Chingale	6,000	12th in Moçambola
CD Costa do Sol	Maputo	Estádio do Costa do Sol	10,000	10th in Moçambola
Desportivo de Nacala	Nampula	Estadio 25 de Junho	5,000	9th in Moçambola
Clube Ferroviário da Beira	Beira	Estádio do Ferroviário	7,000	Moçambola Champions
Clube Ferroviário de Maputo	Maputo	Estádio da Machava	45,000	6th in Moçambola
Clube Ferroviário de Nacala Velha	Nacala	Estádio do Nacala Velha	15,000	9th in Moçambola
Clube Ferroviário de Nampula	Nampula	Estadio 25 de Junho	5,000	5th in Moçambola
Liga Muçulmana de Maputo	Matola	Estádio Da Liga Muçulmana	5,000	4th in Moçambola
FC Lichinga	Lichinga	Estádio Municipal 1º de Maio	10,000	Regional groups
Associação Desportiva de Macuácua	Macuácua			Regional groups
C.D. Maxaquene	Matola	Campo do Matchedje	15,000	7th in Moçambola
GD HCB Songo	Songo	Estádio 27 de Novembro	2,000	2nd in Moçambola
G.D.R. Textáfrica	Chimoio	Campo do Soalpo	2,000	Regional groups
Vilankulo F.C.	Vilankulo	Estádio Municipal de Vilankulo	5,000	11th in Moçambola

=== Stadiums and locations ===
Locations of the 2015 Moçambola teams

== League table ==
Pos	Team	Pld	W	D	L	GF	GA	GD	Pts	Qualification or relegation
1	Songo	30	19	7	4	38	15	+23	64	2018 CAF Champions League
2	Costa do Sol	30	16	8	6	41	19	+22	56	2018 CAF Confederation Cup
3	Ferroviário Nacala	30	14	8	8	27	18	+9	50	
4	Ferroviário Beira	30	11	12	7	36	27	+9	45	
5	Desportivo Nacala	30	10	14	6	23	18	+5	44	
6	LD Maputo	30	12	8	10	40	30	+10	44	
7	Chibuto	30	11	10	9	28	28	0	43	
8	Ferroviário Maputo	30	12	7	11	26	24	+2	43	
9	Vilankulo	30	9	13	8	27	25	+2	40	
10	Ferroviário Nampula	30	7	16	7	22	20	+2	37	
11	Textáfrica	30	10	7	13	27	38	−11	37	
12	Maxaquene	30	8	10	12	25	28	−3	34	
13	1º de Maio	30	8	10	12	30	36	−6	34	
14	Chingale de Tete	30	8	6	16	30	44	−14	30	Relegation to regional groups
15	UP de Lichinga	30	6	8	16	15	30	−15	26	Relegation to regional groups
16	Macuácua	30	4	6	20	12	47	−35	18	Relegation to regional groups

Source: Soccerway.com
Rules for classification: 1) points; 2) head-to-head points; 3) head-to-head goal difference; 4) goal difference

== Positions by round ==
Team ╲ Round	1	2	3	4	5	6	7	8	9	10	11	12	13	14	15	16	17	18	19	20	21	22	23	24	25	26	27	28	29	30
Songo	1	1	1	1	1	1	1	1	1	1	1	1																		
LD Maputo	3	7	10	6	9	8	4	2	2	2	2	2																		
Ferroviário Maputo	6	2	3	3	5	2	2	3	5	4	3	3																		
Costa do Sol	12	12	15	12	6	5	3	6	3	3	4	4																		
Ferroviário Nampula	6	10	11	8	8	7	9	7	6	6	8	5																		
Ferroviário Beira	12	6	9	13	13	9	10	8	4	5	5	6																		
Chibuto	1	4	2	5	2	6	5	9	9	9	6	7																		
Ferroviário Nacala	15	7	5	9	12	13	12	13	10	10	7	8																		
Maxaquene	6	2	7	4	3	3	7	5	7	7	9	9																		
UP de Lichinga	3	9	4	2	4	4	8	4	8	7	9	10																		
Desportivo Nacala	3	5	8	10	10	11	13	11	12	12	12	11																		
1º de Maio	15	14	13	7	11	12	14	14	14	14	13	12																		
Vilankulo	6	12	11	14	14	14	11	12	13	13	13	13																		
Textáfrica	6	14	6	11	7	10	6	10	11	11	11	14																		
Chingale de Tete	12	16	15	16	16	15	15	15	15	15	16	15																		
Macuácua	6	10	13	15	15	16	16	16	16	15	15	16																		

Leader
Relegation to regional groups

Updated to match(es) played on 14 May 2017. Source: Soccerway
