= 2016 Moçambola =

Moçambola
- Season: 2016
- Champions: Ferroviário Beira
- Relegated: Desportivo Maputo; Desportivo Niassa; Estrela Vermelha Maputo
- 2017 CAF Champions League: Ferroviário Beira
- Matches: 240
- Goals: 453 (1.89 per match)
- Biggest home win: Desportivo Nacala 6-1 Desportivo Niassa (11 September 2016)
- Biggest away win: 2 matches: Desportivo Maputo 1-4 Maxaquene (16 July 2016); Desportivo Niassa 0-3 Ferroviário Nampula (25 September 2016)
- Highest scoring: Desportivo Nacala 6-1 Desportivo Niassa (11 September 2016)
- Longest winning run: Ferroviário Beira (6)
- Longest unbeaten run: Ferroviário Nampula (16)
- Longest winless run: Desportivo Maputo (23)
- Longest losing run: Desportivo Niassa (7)
- All statistics correct as of 1 November 2016.

The 2016 Moçambola is the 39th season of top-tier football in Mozambique. The season began on 12 March 2016. Ferroviário Beira won their final six matches to pass Songo in the standings and clinch their first league title (they had won two colonial championships prior to independence).

== Teams ==
The league expanded to 16 teams for the 2016 season with Chingale de Tete, Desportivo de Niassa and Estrela Vermelha Beira being promoted from regional groups and only Ferroviário Quelimane relegated following their last place finish in 2015.

=== Stadiums and locations ===
Locations of the 2015 Moçambola teams

Team	Home city	Stadium	Capacity	2016 season
1º de Maio de Quelimane	Quelimane	Estádio 1º de Maio	8,000	12th in Moçambola
FC Chibuto	Chibuto	Campo do Chibuto	2,000	9th in Moçambola
CD Chingale	Tete	Estádio do Chingale	6,000	Regional groups
CD Costa do Sol	Maputo	Estádio do Costa do Sol	10,000	2nd in Moçambola
Desportivo Maputo	Maputo	Estádio 1º de Maio	18,000	11th in Moçambola
Desportivo de Nacala	Nampula	Estadio 25 de Junho	5,000	13th in Moçambola
Clube Desportivo de Niassa	Niassa			Regional groups
Estrela Vermelha Beira	Beira	Campo do Afrin	5,000	Regional groups
Clube Ferroviário da Beira	Beira	Estádio do Ferroviário	7,000	4th in Moçambola
Clube Ferroviário de Maputo	Maputo	Estádio da Machava	45,000	Moçambola Champions
Clube Ferroviário de Nacala Velha	Nacala	Estádio do Nacala Velha	15,000	8th in Moçambola
Clube Ferroviário de Nampula	Nampula	Estadio 25 de Junho	5,000	6th in Moçambola
GD HCB Songo	Songo	Estádio 27 de Novembro	2,000	5th in Moçambola
Liga Muçulmana de Maputo	Matola	Estádio Da Liga Muçulmana	5,000	3rd in Moçambola
C.D. Maxaquene	Matola	Campo do Matchedje	15,000	7th in Moçambola
Vilankulo F.C.	Vilankulo	Estádio Municipal de Vilankulo	5,000	10th in Moçambola

== League table ==
Pos	Team	Pld	W	D	L	GF	GA	GD	Pts	Qualification or relegation
1	Ferroviário Beira (C, Q)	30	18	7	5	40	21	+19	61	2017 CAF Champions League
2	Songo	30	16	7	7	32	14	+18	55	
3	Chibuto	30	13	11	6	35	19	+16	50 (Note: CHI: 8 points; LDM: 4 points; FNM: 3 points)	
4	LD Maputo	30	15	5	10	37	21	+16	50	
5	Ferroviário Nampula	30	13	11	6	37	21	+16	50	
6	Ferroviário Maputo	30	13	10	7	27	18	+9	49	
7	Maxaquene	30	11	10	9	28	26	+2	43	
8	Ferroviário Nacala	30	10	12	8	22	24	−2	42	
9	Desportivo Nacala	30	10	10	10	39	34	+5	40	
10	Costa do Sol	30	10	8	12	34	33	+1	38	
11	Vilankulo	30	9	10	11	22	28	−6	37	
12	Chingale de Tete	30	9	6	15	19	41	−22	33	
13	1º de Maio	30	7	11	12	30	36	−6	32	
14	Estrela Vermelha Beira (R)	30	6	12	12	28	36	−8	30	Relegation to regional groups
15	Desportivo Maputo (R)	30	2	13	15	15	34	−19	19	Relegation to regional groups
16	Desportivo Niassa (R)	30	3	7	20	11	50	−39	16	Relegation to regional groups

Updated to match(es) played on 1 November 2016. Source: Soccerway.com
Rules for classification: 1) points; 2) head-to-head points; 3) head-to-head goal difference; 4) goal difference
(C) Champions; (Q) Qualified for the phase indicated; (R) Relegated

== Positions by round ==
Leader
Relegation to regional groups

Team ╲ Round	1	2	3	4	5	6	7	8	9	10	11	12	13	14	15	16	17	18	19	20	21	22	23	24	25	26	27	28	29	30
Ferroviário Beira	2	1	2	5	8	5	2	6	5	6	4	5	7	6	3	2	4	2	1	2	2	2	2	2	2	2	1	1	1	1
Songo	2	1	1	4	2	2	4	1	2	2	1	1	1	1	1	1	1	1	2	1	1	1	1	1	1	1	2	2	2	2
Chibuto	4	7	10	9	6	8	7	4	4	1	5	6	5	8	8	8	7	6	5	5	6	5	4	3	3	3	4	4	3	3
LD Maputo	12	14	6	1	1	1	1	2	1	3	3	3	4	3	6	6	8	8	6	6	5	6	6	6	4	4	3	3	4	4
Ferroviário Nampula	4	13	9	10	7	10	10	9	8	8	8	7	6	5	4	5	3	4	4	4	3	3	3	4	5	6	6	6	5	5
Ferroviário Maputo	12	14	4	3	3	5	2	5	6	4	6	2	2	2	2	4	2	3	3	3	4	4	5	5	6	5	5	5	6	6
Maxaquene	1	5	7	6	5	4	6	8	7	6	7	9	8	7	5	3	5	7	7	7	7	8	7	7	7	7	7	7	7	7
Ferroviário Nacala	4	10	13	13	15	16	16	16	15	16	14	14	11	11	11	11	11	11	10	10	10	9	9	11	8	8	8	8	8	8
Desportivo Nacala	14	5	5	7	10	11	12	11	11	11	9	8	9	9	9	9	9	9	9	8	8	10	10	9	11	9	10	9	10	9
Costa do Sol	4	1	8	8	9	7	9	10	10	10	11	10	12	14	10	10	10	10	11	11	11	11	11	10	10	11	11	11	11	10
Vilankulo	4	1	3	2	4	3	5	3	3	5	2	4	3	4	7	7	6	5	8	9	9	7	8	8	9	10	9	10	9	11
Chingale de Tete	4	10	14	14	12	13	15	15	16	12	15	12	14	13	14	14	14	14	14	14	14	12	13	12	12	12	12	12	12	12
1º de Maio	4	9	12	16	16	14	13	14	14	15	13	13	13	10	13	13	13	13	13	13	13	13	12	13	13	13	13	13	13	13
Estrela Vermelha Beira	4	7	10	10	11	8	8	7	8	9	10	11	10	11	11	11	12	12	12	12	12	14	14	14	14	14	14	14	14	14
Desportivo Maputo	16	16	16	12	14	15	14	13	13	14	16	16	16	16	15	15	15	15	15	15	16	16	15	15	15	15	15	15	15	15
Desportivo Niassa	14	12	15	15	13	11	11	12	12	13	12	15	15	15	16	16	16	16	16	16	15	15	16	16	16	16	16	16	16	16

Updated to match(es) played on 1 November 2016. Source: Soccerway
