= 2015 Moçambola =

Moçambola
- Season: 2015
- Champions: Ferroviário Maputo
- Relegated: 1º de Maio; Desportivo de Nacala; Ferroviário Quelimane
- 2016 CAF Champions League: Ferroviário Maputo
- Matches: 182
- Goals: 291 (1.6 per match)
- Biggest home win: LD Maputo 5–0 Desportivo de Nacala (11 April 2015)
- Biggest away win: Ferroviário Quelimane 0–5 LD Maputo (10 May 2015)
- Highest scoring: 2 matches: Ferroviário Maputo 5-1 Vilankulo (5 April 2015); Chibuto 4–2 Maxaquene (12 September 2015)
- Longest winning run: Costa do Sol (4)
- Longest unbeaten run: LD Maputo (9)
- Longest winless run: Ferroviário Quelimane (20)
- Longest losing run: 1º de Maio; Ferroviário Quelimane; Maxaquene (5)
- All statistics correct as of 1 November 2015.

The 2015 Moçambola is the 38th season of top-tier football in Mozambique. The season began on 14 March 2014. Ferroviário Maputo won the league title by a single point with a 1–1 draw at Ferroviário Nampula. Costa do Sol could have taken the championship with a win or pulled even with a draw, but fell 1–0 at Chibuto to finish second despite leading the league for seven of the last 10 weeks. The championship was the 10th overall for Ferroviário Maputo and first since 2009.

1º de Maio, Desportivo de Nacala and Ferroviário Quelimane finished as the bottom three teams in the league table and were relegated to regional groups for the 2016 season.

== Teams ==
A total of 14 teams will contest the league, including 11 sides from the 2014 season and three promoted from 2014 regional groups, Ferroviário Nacala, 1º de Maio and Vilankulo.

On the other hand, Têxtil do Punguè, Ferroviário Pemba and Estrela Vermelha Beira were the last three teams of the 2014 season and are playing in regional groups for the 2015 season. LD Maputo are the defending champions from the 2014 season.

=== Stadiums and locations ===
Locations of the 2015 Moçambola teams

Team	Home city	Stadium	Capacity	2014 season
1º de Maio de Quelimane	Maputo	Estádio 1º de Maio	18,000	Regional groups
FC Chibuto	Chibuto	Campo do Chibuto	2,000	7th in Moçambola
CD Costa do Sol	Maputo	Estádio do Costa do Sol	10,000	8th in Moçambola
Desportivo Maputo	Maputo	Estádio 1º de Maio	18,000	4th in Moçambola
Desportivo de Nacala	Nampula	Estadio 25 de Junho	5,000	9th in Moçambola
Clube Ferroviário da Beira	Beira	Estádio do Ferroviário	7,000	3rd in Moçambola
Clube Ferroviário de Maputo	Maputo	Estádio da Machava	45,000	10th in Moçambola
Clube Ferroviário de Nacala Velha	Nacala	Estádio do Nacala Velha	15,000	Regional groups
Clube Ferroviário de Nampula	Nampula	Estadio 25 de Junho	5,000	2nd in Moçambola
Ferroviário de Quelimane	Quelimane	Campo do Ferroviário de Quelimane	3,000	11th in Moçambola
GD HCB Songo	Songo	Estádio 27 de Novembro	2,000	5th in Moçambola
Liga Muçulmana de Maputo	Matola	Estádio Da Liga Muçulmana	5,000	Moçambola Champions
C.D. Maxaquene	Matola	Campo do Matchedje	15,000	6th in Moçambola
Vilankulo F.C.	Vilankulo	Estádio Municipal de Vilankulo	5,000	Regional groups

== League table ==
Pos	Team	Pld	W	D	L	GF	GA	GD	Pts	Qualification or relegation
1	Ferroviário Maputo (C, Q)	26	12	8	6	35	20	+15	44	2016 CAF Champions League
2	Costa do Sol	26	12	7	7	26	17	+9	43 (Note: LDM 0-0 CDS; CDS 1-0 LDM)	
3	LD Maputo (Q)	26	12	7	7	26	12	+14	43	2016 CAF Confederation Cup
4	Ferroviário Beira	26	11	6	9	24	21	+3	39 (Note: FBE 1-0 HCB; HCB 0-0 FBE)	
5	HCB Songo	26	10	9	7	22	17	+5	39	
6	Ferroviário Nampula	26	9	10	7	18	18	0	37	
7	Maxaquene	26	10	6	10	21	21	0	36	
8	Ferroviário Nacala	26	9	7	10	17	15	+2	34 (Note: FNC: 10 points; CHI: 4 points; VIL: 2 points)	
9	Chibuto	26	8	10	8	23	20	+3	34	
10	Vilankulo	26	9	7	10	23	27	−4	34	
11	Desportivo Maputo	26	7	9	10	17	25	−8	30	
12	1º de Maio (R)	26	6	11	9	17	25	−8	29	Relegation to regional groups
13	Desportivo de Nacala (R)	26	6	9	11	16	27	−11	27	Relegation to regional groups
14	Ferroviário Quelimane (R)	26	3	10	13	9	30	−21	19	Relegation to regional groups

Updated to match(es) played on 1 November 2015. Source: FIFA.com
Rules for classification: 1) points; 2) head-to-head points; 3) head-to-head goal difference; 4) goal difference
(C) Champions; (Q) Qualified for the phase indicated; (R) Relegated

== Results ==
All teams play in a double round robin system (home and away).

Home \ Away	1DM	CHI	CDS	DMA	DDN	FBE	FMA	FNC	FNM	FQU	HCB	LDM	MAX	VIL
1º de Maio		1–1	1–2	0–0	1–0	1–1	1–3	1–0	0–1	0–0	2–2	0–1	2–1	2–1
Chibuto	0–0		1–0	3–1	2–0	3–1	1–0	0–1	0–0	3–0	0–0	0–0	4–2	2–1
Costa do Sol	2–0	3–0		2–1	1–0	0–1	0–0	1–0	1–0	1–0	1–1	1–0	1–2	2–0
Desportivo Maputo	2–2	1–0	2–2		0–2	0–0	1–2	1–0	2–1	0–0	1–1	0–0	2–1	0–1
Desportivo de Nacala	1–2	1–0	1–1	0–0		1–1	2–1	0–0	1–1	2–0	1–0	0–1	0–0	0–1
Ferroviário Beira	1–0	1–1	1–2	3–0	3–0		1–0	0–1	0–2	1–0	1–0	1–0	2–0	1–2
Ferroviário Maputo	0–0	1–1	0–0	0–1	2–1	2–1		1–0	4–0	3–0	3–1	1–0	0–2	5–1
Ferroviário Nacala	0–0	2–0	0–0	1–0	2–0	0–1	0–2		1–1	0–0	2–0	3–1	1–0	2–1
Ferroviário Nampula	0–1	1–0	0–2	2–0	0–0	1–0	1–1	0–0		1–0	1–1	2–1	1–0	1–0
Ferroviário Quelimane	0–0	1–1	1–0	0–1	1–1	1–1	0–1	1–0	0–0		1–0	0–5	1–2	1–1
HCB Songo	1–0	1–0	2–0	0–0	0–0	0–0	0–0	2–1	1–0	3–0		1–0	1–0	2–0
LD Maputo	0–0	0–0	0–0	1–0	5–0	2–0	3–1	1–0	1–0	1–0	2–1		0–1	1–0
Maxaquene	2–0	1–0	1–0	1–0	1–2	0–1	1–1	1–0	0–0	0–0	0–1	0–0		0–0
Vilankulo	3–0	0–0	2–1	0–1	1–0	2–0	1–1	0–0	1–1	2–1	1–0	0–0	1–2	

Updated to match(es) played on 1 November 2015. Source: soccerway.com
Legend: Blue = home team win; Yellow = draw; Red = away team win.

== Positions by round ==
Leader
Relegation to regional groups

Team ╲ Round	1	2	3	4	5	6	7	8	9	10	11	12	13	14	15	16	17	18	19	20	21	22	23	24	25	26
Ferroviário Maputo	2	8	5	3	2	1	2	3	3	6	5	7	5	5	5	3	3	4	4	4	2	2	1	3	1	1
Costa do Sol	6	3	8	11	12	12	9	4	4	5	4	4	3	2	2	1	2	1	1	1	1	1	2	1	2	2
LD Maputo	6	3	1	4	3	2	3	1	1	2	3	2	2	4	4	5	4	3	3	2	4	3	4	2	3	3
Ferroviário Beira	14	8	3	7	9	13	13	14	9	11	8	10	7	9	9	8	7	5	6	5	3	4	3	4	4	4
HCB Songo	10	6	12	6	8	5	10	8	11	8	10	11	11	11	11	9	9	9	7	6	7	5	7	5	5	5
Ferroviário Nampula	1	5	11	13	7	9	5	9	7	7	6	6	9	7	8	7	8	10	10	10	9	6	8	6	6	6
Maxaquene	2	1	2	1	1	3	1	2	2	1	1	1	1	1	1	2	1	2	2	3	5	7	9	9	9	7
Ferroviário Nacala	10	6	9	5	6	8	6	7	5	3	2	3	4	3	3	4	5	6	8	9	8	8	5	8	7	8
Chibuto	6	11	6	9	10	11	12	10	12	12	13	12	13	12	12	13	12	11	12	12	13	10	10	10	10	9
Vilankulo	10	13	14	14	14	10	11	13	13	13	12	9	8	8	7	6	6	8	5	8	6	9	6	7	8	10
Desportivo Maputo	2	8	10	12	13	14	14	12	8	10	11	13	12	13	13	12	11	12	11	7	10	11	11	11	11	11
1° de Maio	6	11	7	8	11	7	8	6	10	9	9	8	6	6	6	10	10	7	9	10	11	13	13	13	13	12
Desportivo de Nacala	2	1	4	2	4	4	4	5	6	4	7	5	10	10	10	11	13	13	13	13	12	12	12	12	12	13
Ferroviário Quelimane	10	13	12	10	5	6	7	11	14	14	14	14	14	14	14	14	14	14	14	14	14	14	14	14	14	14

Updated to match(es) played on 1 November 2015. Source: Soccerway (in French)
