= List of football stadiums in Mozambique =

This is a list of football stadiums in Mozambique, ranked in descending order of capacity with at least 5,000 spectators. Some stadiums are football-specific and some are used for other purposes.

== Current stadiums ==
#	Image	Stadium	Capacity	City	Home team
1		Estádio da Machava	45,000	Maputo	Clube Ferroviário de Maputo
2		Estádio do Zimpeto	42,000	Maputo	Mozambique national football team
3		Estádio do Maxaquene	15,000	Maputo	Clube de Desportos do Maxaquene
4		Estádio do Costa do Sol	10,000	Maputo	CD Costa do Sol
5		Estádio Municipal 1º de Maio	10,000	Lichinga	Futebol Clube de Lichinga
6		Estádio Municipal de Pemba	10,000	Pemba	Clube Ferroviário de Pemba
7		Estádio Matateu	8,000	Maputo	Grupo Desportivo de Maputo
8		Estádio do Ferroviário da Beira	5,000	Beira	Clube Ferroviário da Beira

== See also ==
- List of association football stadiums by capacity
- List of African stadiums by capacity
- Football in Mozambique
- Lists of stadiums
