= 2011 Moçambola =

Moçambola
- Season: 2011
- 2012 CAF Champions League: Liga Muçulmana
- 2012 CAF Confederation Cup: Ferroviário de Maputo (cup winner)

The 2011 Moçambola was the 36th season of top-tier football in Mozambique. The season began on 5 March. Liga Muçulmana were the defending champions, having won their 1st Mozambican championship in 2010. They successfully defended their title.

The league comprises 14 teams, the bottom three of which will play a relegation round.

== League table ==
Pos	Team	Pld	W	D	L	GF	GA	GD	Pts	Qualification
1	Liga Muçulmana (C)	26	19	4	3	48	18	+30	61	2012 CAF Champions League
2	Maxaquene	26	15	8	3	45	14	+31	53	
3	HCB Songo	26	10	11	5	28	13	+15	41	
4	Costa do Sol	26	11	6	9	31	25	+6	39	
5	Ferroviário de Maputo	26	10	7	9	36	32	+4	37	2012 CAF Confederation Cup
6	Ferroviário de Nampula	26	10	6	10	28	26	+2	36	
7	Chingale de Tete	26	9	9	8	19	23	−4	36	
8	Vilankulo	26	10	5	11	26	25	+1	35	
9	Desportivo de Maputo	26	10	5	11	23	25	−2	35	
10	Ferroviário da Beira	26	6	13	7	21	25	−4	31	
11	Incomáti de Xinavane	26	8	5	13	11	25	−14	29	
12	Matchedje Maputo	26	7	6	13	21	36	−15	27	Qualification for relegation playoffs
13	Atlético Muçulmano	26	5	6	15	20	37	−17	21	Qualification for relegation playoffs
14	Sporting Beira	26	4	5	17	20	53	−33	17	Qualification for relegation playoffs

Updated to match(es) played on 6 Nov 2011. Source: FIFA.com
Rules for classification: 1) points; 2) head-to-head points; 3) head-to-head goal difference; 4) head-to-head goals scored; 5) goal difference; 6) number of goals scored.
(C) Champions

== Results ==
Each team plays every opponent twice, once at each team's home ground.

Home \ Away	AMU	CHT	CSL	DMA	FBE	FMA	FNA	HSO	IXV	LMU	MAM	MAX	SBE	VLK
Atlético Muçulmano		0–0	1–0	1–4	0–1	1–4	2–5	0–0	0–1	2–5	1–2	0–2	3–0	1–0
Chingale de Tete	0–0		1–0	0–2	1–0	2–1	0–0	1–0	1–0	1–0	0–1	2–0	0–0	3–3
Costa do Sol	2–1	1–0		2–1	2–0	2–2	2–1	0–1	2–0	0–1	2–1	0–3	6–3	0–1
Desportivo de Maputo	2–1	1–0	0–1		0–0	1–1	1–0	0–2	0–1	1–3	3–0	0–1	0–0	0–1
Ferroviário da Beira	3–1	1–1	0–0	0–0		2–0	0–0	1–1	0–0	0–0	0–0	3–2	0–1	0–0
Ferroviário de Maputo	3–1	2–1	2–1	1–2	3–3		1–2	1–0	2–0	1–1	3–2	1–1	1–0	0–1
Ferroviário de Nampula	2–1	1–2	0–0	0–0	1–2	2–0		1–0	1–0	0–2	2–0	0–0	5–2	1–1
HCB Songo	0–0	1–1	2–0	0–1	3–0	1–1	3–0		0–0	2–0	0–0	1–1	5–1	1–0
Incomáti de Xinavane	0–0	2–0	0–4	0–2	1–1	1–0	1–1	0–1		0–1	0–1	0–1	0–0	0–0
Liga Muçulmana	1–0	1–0	0–1	1–0	4–1	2–1	2–0	0–0	2–0		4–1	1–1	8–2	2–1
Matchedje Maputo	1–2	0–0	1–1	1–0	0–0	1–3	2–0	0–1	1–2	0–1		0–4	1–2	2–1
Maxaquene	0–0	5–0	0–0	4–0	2–1	1–1	3–0	2–1	2–0	1–2	0–0		5–1	1–0
Sporting da Beira	1–0	1–1	1–1	1–0	1–3	1–0	0–1	1–1	0–1	1–3	0–1	0–1		1–2
Vilankulo	0–0	0–1	2–1	2–3	2–0	0–1	0–2	1–1	1–0	1–2	4–1	0–2	2–0	

Updated to match(es) played on 6 Nov 2011. Source: soccerway.com
Legend: Blue = home team win; Yellow = draw; Red = away team win.

== Goalscorers ==
Rank	Scorer	Club	Goals
1	(Mozambique) Betinho	Maxaquene	15
2	(Mozambique) David	Costa do Sol	11
3	(Mozambique) Luís	Ferroviário de Maputo	10

Last updated: 21 Nov 2011.
Source: opais.co.mz
