= Ferroviário =

Ferroviário may refer to sports clubs in:

== Angola ==
- C.D. Ferroviário do Huambo, a football club from Huambo
- Clube Ferroviário da Huíla, a football club from Lubango
- Clube Ferroviário de Luanda, a football club from Luanda

== Brazil ==
- Ferroviário Atlético Clube (CE), a football club from Fortaleza, Ceará
- Ferroviário Atlético Clube (AL), a defunct football club from Maceió, Alagoas
- Ferroviário Atlético Clube (RO), a football club from Porto Velho, Rondônia
- Ferroviário Esporte Clube, a football club from São Luís, Maranhão
- Ferroviário Esporte Clube (Serra Talhada), a football club from Serra Talhada, Pernambuco
- Operário Ferroviário Esporte Clube, a football club from Ponta Grossa, Paraná
- Clube Atlético Ferroviário, a defunct football club from Curitiba, Paraná and forming Colorado Esporte Clube and Paraná Clube
- Clube Ferroviário do Recife, a football club from Recife, Pernambuco

== Mozambique ==
- Clube Ferroviário da Beira (disambiguation)
  - Clube Ferroviário da Beira (basketball), a basketball club from Beira
  - Clube Ferroviário da Beira (football), a football club from Beira
- Clube Ferroviário de Maputo, a football and basketball club from Maputo
- Clube Ferroviário de Nacala Velha, a football club from Nacala
- Clube Ferroviário de Nampula, a football club from Nampula
- Clube Ferroviário Pemba, a football club from Pemba
- Clube Ferroviário de Quelimane, a football club from Quelimane

== See also ==
- Ferroviária (disambiguation)
