= Lau King =

Mozambican footballer

Personal information
- Birth name: Pachoio Lau Há King
- Date of birth: September 4, 1995 (age 31)
- Place of birth: Pemba, Mozambique
- Height: 1.89 m (6 ft 2 1/2 in)
- Position: Striker

Team information
- Current team: Songo
- Number: 16

Senior career*
Years	Team	Apps	(Gls)
2013–2016	Desportivo Pemba		
2016–2017	Ferroviário Pemba		
2017–2018	Nacala		
2018–2023	Songo	75	(32)
2023	Sagrada Esperança	11	(3)
2023–	Songo	0	(0)

International career^{‡}
2020–	Mozambique	25	(4)
- * Club domestic league appearances and goals as of 4 January 2024 ‡ National team caps and goals as of 4 July 2024

Pachoio Lau Há King (born 9 April 1995) is a Mozambican professional footballer who plays as a striker for Songo, and the Mozambique national team.

== Career ==
King began his senior career in the Mozambican third division with Desportivo Pemba in 2013, before moving to the second with Ferroviário Pemba in 2016. He first played in the Moçambola with Nacala in 2017. In 2018, he moved to Songo where he stayed for 4 seasons. In January 2023, he moved to the Angolan club Sagrada Esperança. After contractual issues, he returned to Songo on 26 December 2023.

== International ==
King debuted with the senior Mozambique national team in a 1–0 friendly loss to Guinea-Bissau on 8 October 2020. He was called up to the national team for the 2023 Africa Cup of Nations.

== Career statistics ==
=== International ===
As of match played 7 June 2024

Appearances and goals by national team and year
National team	Year	Apps	Goals
Mozambique	2020	2	0
Mozambique	2021	3	0
Mozambique	2022	8	2
Mozambique	2023	6	1
Mozambique	2024	6	1
Total		25	4

Scores and results list Mozambique's goal tally first, score column indicates score after each King goal.

List of international goals scored by Lau King
No.	Date	Venue	Opponent	Score	Result	Competition	Ref.
1	17 July 2022	Moses Mabhida Stadium, Durban, South Africa	Senegal	1–1	1–1	2022 COSAFA Cup	
2	30 July 2022	National Heroes Stadium, Lusaka, Zambia	Zambia	1–0	1–0	2022 African Nations Championship qualification	
3	17 January 2023	Nelson Mandela Bay Stadium, Gqeberha, South Africa	Libya	3–1	3–2	2022 African Nations Championship	
4	6 January 2024	FNB Stadium, Johannesburg, South Africa	Lesotho	2–0	2–0	Friendly	

== Honours ==
Songo

- Moçambola: 2018, 2022
