= Melque Alexandre =

Mozambican footballer (born 1997)

Personal information
- Full name: Melque Melito Alexandre Garcia
- Date of birth: 26 June 1997 (age 29)
- Place of birth: Quelimane, Mozambique
- Height: 1.68 m (5 ft 6 in)
- Position: Forward

Team information
- Current team: Songo

Senior career*
Years	Team	Apps	(Gls)
2017–2018	1º de Maio de Quelimane		
2018–2019	Chibuto		
2019–2024	Black Bulls		
2024–	Songo		

International career^{‡}
2021–	Mozambique	30	(4)
- * Club domestic league appearances and goals as of 23:55, 21 December 2025 (UTC) ‡ National team caps and goals as of 23:55, 21 December 2025 (UTC)

Melque Melito Alexandre Garcia (born 26 June 1997) is a Mozambican professional footballer who plays as a forward for Moçambola club Songo and the Mozambique national team.

== Club career ==
Melque Alexandre began his senior career in the Moçambola with 1º de Maio de Quelimane in 2017, following that up with a stint in Chibuto. In 2019, he transferred to Black Bulls and helped them win the 2021 and 2024 Moçambola tournaments. On 3 December 2024, he transferred to Songo.

== International career ==
Melque Alexandre made the senior Mozambique national team for the 2025 Africa Cup of Nations.

== Honours ==
Black Bulls

- Moçambola: 2021, 2024
- Taça de Moçambique: 2023
