= Pusic =

Pusic may refer to:

- PUSIC, the Party for Unity and Safeguarding of the Integrity of Congo
- Pusić, a Croatian surname
- Pušić, a Croatian surname
