= List of Portuguese football transfers winter 2013–14 =

This is a list of Portuguese winter football transfers for the 2013–14 season. The winter transfer window opened on 2 January 2014 and closed at 6:00 pm on 31 January 2014. Players could be bought before the transfer window opened, but were not permitted to join their new clubs until 2 January. Additionally, players without a club could join at any time and clubs were able to sign a goalkeeper on an emergency loan if they had no registered goalkeeper available. Only moves involving Primeira Liga clubs are listed; included are clubs that completed transfers after the closing of the summer 2013 transfer window due to other domestic leagues having a later closure date to their transfer window.

== Transfers ==
Date	Name	Moving from	Moving to	Fee
3 September 2013	(Brazil) Jean Pablo	Unattached	(Portugal) Vitória de Guimarães	Free
4 September 2013	(Liberia) Theo Lewis Weeks	(Turkey) Göztepe	(Portugal) Marítimo	Free
4 September 2013	(Brazil) Victor Golas	(Portugal) Sporting CP	(Romania) Corona Braşov	Loan
4 September 2013	(Ghana) William Owusu	(Portugal) Sporting CP	(Romania) Corona Braşov	Loan
5 September 2013	(Portugal) Pedro Santos	(Portugal) Braga	(Romania) Astra Giurgiu	Loan
6 September 2013	(Portugal) Júlio Alves	(Turkey) Beşiktaş	(Portugal) Rio Ave	Free
6 September 2013	(Angola) Djalma Campos	(Portugal) Porto	(Turkey) Torku Konyaspor	Loan
6 September 2013	(Portugal) Nuno Piloto	Unattached	(Portugal) Académica de Coimbra	Free
7 September 2013	(Portugal) Yazalde	(Portugal) Braga	(Romania) Astra Giurgiu	Loan
3 October 2013	(Denmark) Per Krøldrup	Unattached	(Portugal) Olhanense	Free
1 November 2013	(Croatia) Tin Karamatić	(Croatia) Inter Zaprešić	(Portugal) Olhanense	Free
4 November 2013	(Portugal) Rúben Vezo	(Portugal) Vitória de Setúbal	(Spain) Valencia	€1,600,000
8 November 2013	(Brazil) Joeano	Unattached	(Portugal) Rio Ave	Free
10 November 2013	(Croatia) Anthony Šerić	Unattached	(Portugal) Olhanense	Free
16 November 2013	(Angola) Mateus	(Portugal) Nacional	(Angola) Primeiro de Agosto	€500,000
20 November 2013	(Mozambique) Reginaldo Faife	(Mozambique) Liga Muçulmana	(Portugal) Nacional	Free
28 November 2013	(Portugal) João Camacho	Unattached	(Portugal) Nacional	Free
4 December 2013	(Austria) Roland Linz	(Thailand) Muangthong United	(Portugal) Belenenses	Free
4 December 2013	(Portugal) Ricardo Quaresma	Unattached	(Portugal) Porto	Free
4 December 2013	(Tunisia) Lassad Nouioui	Unattached	(Portugal) Arouca	Free
10 December 2013	(São Tomé and Príncipe) Luís Leal	(Portugal) Estoril	(Saudi Arabia) Al-Ahli Jeddah	Undisclosed
18 December 2013	(Brazil) Kadu	(Brazil) Vitória	(Portugal) Braga	Undisclosed
18 December 2013	(France) Bédi Buval	Unattached	(Portugal) Paços de Ferreira	Free
15 December 2013	(Brazil) Jeferson	(Portugal) Rio Ave	(Angola) Benfica de Luanda	Free
17 December 2013	(Mali) Mourtala Diakité	(Portugal) Belenenses	(Angola) Benfica de Luanda	Undisclosed
23 December 2013	(Portugal) André Pinto	Unattached	(Portugal) Braga	Free
23 December 2013	(Romania) Raul Rusescu	(Spain) Sevilla	(Portugal) Braga	Loan
30 December 2013	(Portugal) Arsénio Nunes	(Portugal) Belenenses	(Portugal) Moreirense	Loan
31 December 2013	(Portugal) Gonçalo Brandão	(Italy) Parma	(Portugal) Belenenses	Loan
31 December 2013	(Portugal) Pedro Santos	(Portugal) Braga	(Portugal) Rio Ave	Loan
31 December 2013	(Brazil) Deyverson	(Portugal) Belenenses	(Portugal) Farense	Loan
2 January 2014	(Egypt) Saleh Gomaa	(Egypt) ENPPI	(Portugal) Nacional	Free
2 January 2014	(Cape Verde) Kay	(Portugal) Belenenses	(Angola) Libolo	Free
2 January 2014	(Portugal) Rui Caetano	(Portugal) Paços de Ferreira	(Portugal) Gil Vicente	Free
2 January 2014	(Venezuela) Yonathan Del Valle	(Portugal) Rio Ave	(Portugal) Paços de Ferreira	Loan
2 January 2014	(Portugal) Rúben Ribeiro	(Portugal) Paços de Ferreira	(Portugal) Rio Ave	Free
3 January 2014	(Brazil) Agdon	(Brazil) Vitória	(Portugal) Braga	Free
7 January 2014	(Argentina) Rodrigo Battaglia	(Argentina) Racing	(Portugal) Braga	Undisclosed
8 January 2014	(Brazil) Walter	(Portugal) Porto	(Brazil) Fluminense	Loan
8 January 2014	(Russia) Stanislav Kritsyuk	(Portugal) Braga	(Portugal) Rio Ave	Loan
8 January 2014	(Portugal) Luís Silva	(Portugal) Braga	(Portugal) Gil Vicente	Loan
8 January 2014	(Somalia) Liban Abdi	(Portugal) Académica de Coimbra	(Turkey) Çaykur Rizespor	€500,000
8 January 2014	(Portugal) João Mário	(Portugal) Sporting CP	(Portugal) Vitória de Setúbal	Loan
8 January 2014	(Peru) Paolo Hurtado	(Portugal) Paços de Ferreira	(Uruguay) Peñarol	Loan
9 January 2014	(Morocco) Zakaria Labyad	(Portugal) Sporting CP	(Netherlands) Vitesse Arnhem	Loan
9 January 2014	(Brazil) Ozéia	(Brazil) Criciúma	(Portugal) Vitória de Setúbal	Free
9 January 2014	(Portugal) Zequinha	Unattached	(Portugal) Vitória de Setúbal	Free
9 January 2014	(Brazil) Kayke	(Brazil) Paraná	(Portugal) Nacional	Loan
10 January 2014	(Argentina) Fabián Rinaudo	(Portugal) Sporting CP	(Italy) Catania	Loan
10 January 2014	(Brazil) Hebert	(Portugal) Braga	(Poland) Piast Gliwice	Loan
11 January 2014	(Portugal) Salvador Agra	(Spain) Real Betis	(Portugal) Académica de Coimbra	Loan
13 January 2014	(Brazil) Rafael Amorim	(Portugal) Desportivo das Aves	(Portugal) Paços de Ferreira	Free
13 January 2014	(Brazil) Flávio Boaventura	(Brazil) ABC	(Portugal) Paços de Ferreira	Free
14 January 2014	(Portugal) Rui Sampaio	Unattached	(Portugal) Arouca	Free
14 January 2014	(Portugal) Emídio Rafael	Unattached	(Portugal) Estoril	Free
14 January 2014	(Senegal) Moussa Gueye	(France) Metz	(Portugal) Académica de Coimbra	Free
15 January 2014	(Serbia) Nemanja Matić	(Portugal) Benfica	(England) Chelsea	€25,000,000
16 January 2014	(Nigeria) Elderson Echiéjilé	(Portugal) Braga	(France) AS Monaco	Free
17 January 2014	(Portugal) Rafael Lopes	(Portugal) Penafiel	(Portugal) Académica de Coimbra	Free
17 January 2014	(Portugal) Diogo Salomão	(Portugal) Sporting CP	(Spain) Deportivo La Coruña	Loan
17 January 2014	(Paraguay) Derlis González	(Portugal) Benfica	(Paraguay) Olimpia	Loan
17 January 2014	(Netherlands) Ola John	(Portugal) Benfica	(Germany) Hamburger SV	Loan
18 January 2014	(Burundi) Johane Nizeyimana	(Mozambique) Chibuto	(Portugal) Paços de Ferreira	Loan
20 January 2014	(Serbia) Uroš Matić	(Portugal) Benfica	(Netherlands) NAC Breda	Free
20 January 2014	(France) Romain Salin	Unattached	(Portugal) Marítimo	Free
20 January 2014	(Guinea) Salim Cissé	(Portugal) Sporting CP	(Portugal) Arouca	Loan
20 January 2014	(Brazil) Fransérgio	(Brazil) Internacional	(Portugal) Marítimo	Free
20 January 2014	(Portugal) Minhoca	(Portugal) Santa Clara	(Portugal) Paços de Ferreira	Free
20 January 2014	(France) Florent Hanin	(Portugal) Braga	(Greece) Panetolikos	Loan
21 January 2014	(Peru) Wilder Cartagena	(Peru) Alianza Lima	(Portugal) Vitória de Setúbal	Free
22 January 2014	(Serbia) Stefan Mitrović	(Portugal) Benfica	(Spain) Real Valladolid	Loan
24 January 2014	(Italy) Mario Sampirisi	(Italy) Genoa	(Portugal) Olhanense	Loan
25 January 2014	(Portugal) Betinho	(Portugal) Sporting CP	(Portugal) Vitória de Setúbal	Loan
25 January 2014	(Turkey) Sinan Bolat	(Portugal) Porto	(Turkey) Kayserispor	Loan
25 January 2014	(Argentina) Lucho González	(Portugal) Porto	(Qatar) Al Rayyan	Free
25 January 2014	(Portugal) Hugo Vieira	(Portugal) Braga	(Portugal) Gil Vicente	Loan
26 January 2014	(Portugal) Manuel Liz	(Portugal) Benfica	(Portugal) Atlético CP	Unknown
28 January 2014	(Portugal) Mika	(Portugal) Benfica	(Portugal) Atlético CP	Free
28 January 2014	(Paraguay) Mauro Caballero	(Portugal) Porto	(Portugal) Penafiel	Loan
28 January 2014	(Nigeria) Christian Obodo	Unattached	(Portugal) Olhanense	Free
28 January 2014	(Burundi) Johane Nizeyimana	(Portugal) Paços de Ferreira	(Portugal) Tondela	Loan
29 January 2014	(Portugal) Paulo Sérgio	(Portugal) Arouca	(Portugal) Olhanense	Free
29 January 2014	(France) Ousmane Dramé	Unattached	(Portugal) Sporting CP	Free
29 January 2014	(Argentina) Mario Santana	(Italy) Genoa	(Portugal) Olhanense	Loan
30 January 2014	(Spain) Ustaritz Aldekoaotalora	(Georgia (country)) Dinamo Tbilisi	(Portugal) Arouca	Free
30 January 2014	(Russia) Marat Izmailov	(Portugal) Porto	(Azerbaijan) Gabala	Loan
30 January 2014	(Portugal) Bruno China	(Portugal) Académica de Coimbra	(Portugal) Belenenses	Free
30 January 2014	(Slovenia) Etien Velikonja	(England) Cardiff City	(Portugal) Rio Ave	Loan
30 January 2014	(Paraguay) Matías Pérez	(Paraguay) Nacional	(Portugal) Sporting CP	Free
30 January 2014	(Colombia) John Mosquera	(Germany) Energie Cottbus	(Portugal) Gil Vicente	Free
30 January 2014	(Portugal) Hugo Ventura	(Portugal) Porto	(Portugal) Rio Ave	Free
31 January 2014	(Portugal) Rudy	(Spain) Deportivo La Coruña	(Portugal) Belenenses	Loan
31 January 2014	(Paraguay) Jorge Rojas	(Portugal) Benfica	(Portugal) Belenenses	Loan
31 January 2014	(Senegal) Mor Pouye	(Portugal) Olhanense	(Portugal) Louletano	Loan
31 January 2014	(Ghana) Alhassan Wakaso	(Portugal) Rio Ave	(Portugal) Portimonense	Loan
31 January 2014	(Cape Verde) Héldon Ramos	(Portugal) Marítimo	(Portugal) Sporting CP	Undisclosed
31 January 2014	(Egypt) Shikabala	(Egypt) Zamalek	(Portugal) Sporting CP	Undisclosed
31 January 2014	(Colombia) Erik Moreno	(Colombia) Millonarios	(Portugal) Braga	€550,000
1 February 2014	(Portugal) Tozé Marreco	Unattached	(Portugal) Olhanense	Free
3 February 2014	(Chile) Diego Rubio	(Portugal) Sporting CP	(Norway) Sandnes Ulf	Loan
3 February 2014	(Portugal) Edinho	(Portugal) Braga	(Turkey) Kayseri Erciyesspor	Loan
6 February 2014	(Argentina) Nicolás Otamendi	(Portugal) Porto	(Brazil) Atlético Mineiro	Loan
17 February 2014	(Brazil) Carlão	(Portugal) Paços de Ferreira	(China) Shijiazhuang Yongchang	Free
1 March 2014	(Brazil) Leandro Freire	(Portugal) Nacional	(Kazakhstan) Ordabasy	Loan
10 March 2014	(Portugal) Yannick Djaló	(Portugal) Benfica	(United States) San Jose Earthquakes	Loan

- ^1 Some players may have been bought after the end of the 2013 summer transfer window in Portugal but before the end of that country's transfer window closed.
