= Pouye =

Pouye may be,

- Pouye language

== People ==
- Oumar Pouye
- Mor Pouye
- Babacar Pouye
- Tima Pouye
