= João Chissano =

Mozambican footballer

Personal information
- Date of birth: 26 July 1970 (age 56)
- Place of birth: Maputo, Mozambique
- Height: 1.70 m (5 ft 7 in)
- Position: Rightback

Team information
- Current team: Ferroviário de Maputo (manager)

Senior career*
Years	Team	Apps	(Gls)
1985-1987	Ferroviário de Maputo		
1988-2000	Costa do Sol		
2001	Wits University		

International career
1992–1998	Mozambique	21	(0)

Managerial career
- 2005: Têxtil do Punguè
- 2007: Costa do Sol
- 2011-2013: Mozambique (assistant)
- 2013-2015: Mozambique
- 2017: ENH de Vilankulos
- 2018: Ferroviário de Beira
- 2019: Baía de Pemba
- 2022-: Ferroviário de Maputo
- * Club domestic league appearances and goals

João Chissano (born 26 July 1970) is a Mozambican football manager and retired player, who played as a defender.

== Playing career ==
=== Club ===
João Chissano had a spell at South African side Wits University.

=== International ===
He played in 21 matches for the Mozambique national team from 1992 to 1998. He was also named in Mozambique's squad for the 1998 African Cup of Nations tournament.

== Managerial career ==
In June 2013, João Chissano was appointed manager of the Mozambique national football team, taking over from German coach Gert Engels.

He replaced Boris Pušić as manager ENH de Vilankulos in February 2017 and was sacked as manager of Ferroviário de Beira in July 2018. In 2022 he succeeded Belgian coach Jean Losciuto as manager of Ferroviário de Maputo, after a spell as manager of Baía de Pemba.
