= Ferroviária =

Ferroviária can refer to:

- The Portuguese language word for railway employee
- Desportiva Ferroviária, a Brazilian football (soccer) club from Cariacica, Espírito Santo state
- Associação Ferroviária de Esportes, a Brazilian football (soccer) club from Araraquara, São Paulo state
- Associação Atlética Ferroviária (Assis), a Brazilian football (soccer) club from Assis, São Paulo state; see 1958 São Paulo FC season
- Associação Atlética Ferroviária, a Brazilian football (soccer) club from Botucatu, São Paulo state
- Associação Atlética Ferroviária (Pindamonhangaba), a Brazilian football (soccer) club from Pindamonhangaba, São Paulo state; see Campeonato Paulista Série A2

== See also ==
- Ferroviário (disambiguation)
