= Incomáti de Xinavane =

Grupo Desportivo de Incomáti
- Full name: Grupo Desportivo de Incomáti
- Ground: Campo de Xinavane; Xinavane, Mozambique
- Capacity: 2,500
- League: Moçambola
- 2019: 7 th
Home colours	Away colours

Grupo Desportivo de Incomáti, or simply Incomáti de Xinavane, is a Mozambique multi sports club from Xinavane especially known for its football.

The team was promoted to National Football Division in 2018, after winning the South Zone second league division in 2017. En la última edición de la Moçambola, 2021, los "Azucareros" terminaron en la onceava ubicación de la liga.

== Stadium ==
The club plays their home matches at Campo de Xinavane, which has a maximum capacity of 2500 people.

== League participations ==
- Moçambola: 2011
- Mozambique Second Division ?-2010, 2012–
