= Pušić =

Pušić (pronounced [pǔːʃitɕ]) is a surname. Notable people with the surname include:0

- Antonije Pušić (born 1963), better known as Rambo Amadeus, Montenegrin singer
- Berislav Pušić, Bosnian Croat known for being indicted and convicted at the ICTY
- Boris Pušić (born 1964), Croatian football manager
- Bosiljka Pušić (born 1936), Montenegrin writer and poet
- Domagoj Pušić (born 1991), Croatian football player
- Marino Pušić (born 1971), Croatian football player
- Martin Pušić (born 1987), Austrian footballer of Croatian origin
- Nikica Pušić-Koroljević (born 1983), Croatian handball player
- Petar Pušić (born 1999), Swiss footballer of Croatian descent
- Teodora Pušić (born 1993), Serbian volleyball player

== See also ==
- Pete Pussick, a fictional character from tales about Joe Magarac
- Pusić
