= Johane Nizeyimana =

Burundian footballer (born 1993)

Johane (Jean) Nizeyimana
Personal information
- Full name: Johane (Jean) Nizeyimana
- Date of birth: 10 May 1993 (age 33)
- Place of birth: Burundi
- Height: 1.80 m (5 ft 11 in)
- Position: Forward

Team information
- Current team: FC Chibuto

Senior career*
Years	Team	Apps	(Gls)
2013–2014	Chibuto	24	(14)
2014–2015	Paços Ferreira	14	(7)
2015–2016	→ Tondela (loan)	7	(1)
2016–2017	Chibuto	17	(14)
- * Club domestic league appearances and goals as of 30 January 2015, 20:13 (UTC)

Johane (Jean) Nizeyimana (born 10 May 1993), is a Burundian professional footballer who plays as a forward for FC Chibuto.

== Career ==
Nizeyimana began his professional career with Mozambican side FC de Chibuto. After a season in Mozambique, Nizeyimana signed with top flight Portuguese side Paços de Ferreira in January 2014.

Nizeyimana was loaned out to Segunda Liga side Tondela. He made his debut for the Auriverdes on the 16 February, against Sporting CP B. Nizeyimana would score his first goal for Tondela on the 23 March against Trofense. His loan spell with Tondela, saw him make eight appearances, and score one goal during the process.

Following his loan spell with Tondela, he returned to Paços in the summer of 2014. Nizeyimana was released by the Pacenses. He subsequently rejoined former team Chibuto following his release from Paços de Ferreira. He went on to progressively gain momentum in his time back at Chibuto as one of the leading goal scorers.
