= Boris Pušić =

Croatian football manager

Personal information
- Date of birth: 17 June 1964 (age 62)
- Place of birth: Rijeka, SR Croatia, Yugoslavia

Managerial career
- Years: Team
- 2015-2016: ENH de Vilankulos
- 2015: Mozambique

Boris Pušić (born 17 June 1964) is a Croatian football manager.

In November 2015, he was appointed as head coach of the Mozambique national football team for two 2018 FIFA World Cup qualifying games against Gabon national football team. He took the role while still being manager of Moçambola side Vilankulo. He was replaced at Vilankulo by João Chissano in February 2017.
