= Atlético Muçulmano da Matola =

Atlético Muçulmano
- Full name: Clube Atlético Muçulmano
- Nickname(s): os muçulmanos
- Founded: 2004
- Ground: Campo Do Atlético Muçulmano; Matola, Mozambique
- Capacity: 5.000
- Chairman: Momed Hanif Osman Mahomed
- Manager: Jose Arnaldo Salvado
- League: Moçambola
- 2008: 2nd place
Home colours

Clube Atlético Muçulmano, usually known simply as Atlético Muçulmano, is a traditional football (soccer) club based in the neighbourhood of Machava in Matola, Mozambique. The club's players and members are nicknamed os muçulmanos

== Stadium ==
The club plays their home matches at Campo Do Atlético Muçulmano, which has a maximum capacity of 5,000 people

== Achievements ==
- Taça de Moçambique: 1

2007/08

== Performance in CAF competitions ==
- CAF Confederation Cup: 1 appearance

2009: Preliminary Round

== Current squad ==
Note: Flags indicate national team as defined under FIFA eligibility rules; some limited exceptions apply. Players may hold more than one non-FIFA nationality.

No.	Pos.	Nation	Player
1	GK	(Mozambique) MOZ	Betinho
2	MF	(Mozambique) MOZ	Clarenço
3	DF	(Mozambique) MOZ	Baute
4	DF	(Mozambique) MOZ	James
5	MF	(Mozambique) MOZ	Imraan (Imo)
7	FW	(Mozambique) MOZ	Anibal
8	MF	(Mozambique) MOZ	Manuelito
9	FW	(Mozambique) MOZ	Nahid
10	MF	(Mozambique) MOZ	Dino
11	MF	(Nigeria) NGA	Eboé
12	GK	(Mozambique) MOZ	Pinto
13	DF	(Mozambique) MOZ	Calou (West)
14	DF	(Mozambique) MOZ	Gildo
15	DF	(Mozambique) MOZ	Amade

No.	Pos.	Nation	Player
16	MF	(Zimbabwe) ZIM	Ngone
17	MF	(Mozambique) MOZ	Delço (Petit)
18	DF	(Mozambique) MOZ	Jito
19	DF	(Mozambique) MOZ	Macuvele (Gabito)
20	FW	(Mozambique) MOZ	Avelino (Mamba)
21	MF	(Mozambique) MOZ	Vlinga
22	MF	(Mozambique) MOZ	Danito Nhaposa
23	GK	(Mozambique) MOZ	Lionel
24	MF	(Mozambique) MOZ	Vicentinho
25	MF	(Mozambique) MOZ	Jojó
26	FW	(Mozambique) MOZ	Vitinho
-	MF	(Mozambique) MOZ	Losao Ivanno
-	MF	(Mozambique) MOZ	Karlos Purgen
