= Pusić =

Pusić (pronounced [pǔːsitɕ]) is a surname. Notable people with the surname include:

- Vesna Pusić (born 1953), Croatian sociologist and politician
- Eugen Pusić (1916–2010), Croatian jurist

== See also ==
- Pašić
- Pušić
