= 1958 São Paulo FC season =

São Paulo
1958 season
- Chairman: Cícero Pompeu de Toledo; Laudo Natel
- Manager: Béla Guttmann; Manuel Raymundo; Armando Renganeschi
- Torneio Rio-São Paulo: 4th
- Campeonato Paulista: Runners-up

The 1958 football season was São Paulo's 29th season since club's existence.

== Overall ==
Games played	81 (9 Torneio Rio-São Paulo, 38 Campeonato Paulista, 34 Friendly match)
Games won	44 (4 Torneio Rio-São Paulo, 25 Campeonato Paulista, 15 Friendly match)
Games drawn	20 (2 Torneio Rio-São Paulo, 10 Campeonato Paulista, 8 Friendly match)
Games lost	17 (3 Torneio Rio-São Paulo, 3 Campeonato Paulista, 11 Friendly match)
Goals scored	187
Goals conceded	106
Goal difference	+81
Best result	6–0 (H) v Guarani - Campeonato Paulista - 1958.08.07
Worst result	1–5 (H) v Corinthians - Friendly match - 1958.04.16
Most appearances	
Top scorer	

Source: São Paulo FC

== Friendlies ==
January 3 International	São Paulo (Brazil)	4–1	(Chile) Audax Italiano	São Paulo
	Goal		Goal	Stadium: Estádio Municipal Paulo Machado de Carvalho (Pacaembu)

January 4 National	Corinthians (PP)	1–1	São Paulo	Presidente Prudente
	Goal		Goal

January 6 National	Palmeiras	1–0	São Paulo	São Paulo
	Goal			Stadium: Estádio Palestra Itália (Parque Antártica)

January 9 National	Bahia	3–2	São Paulo	Salvador
	Goal		Goal	Stadium: Estádio Octávio Mangabeira (Fonte Nova)

January 12 National	Moto Club	0–1	São Paulo	São Luís
			Goal	Stadium: Estádio Municipal Nhozinho Santos

January 16 National	Ceará	2–2	São Paulo	Fortaleza
	Goal		Goal	Stadium: Estádio Municipal Presidente Getúlio Vargas

January 19 National	Ferroviário-CE	2–2	São Paulo	Fortaleza
	Goal		Goal	Stadium: Estádio Municipal Presidente Getúlio Vargas

January 23 National	Ferroviário-CE	0–3	São Paulo	Fortaleza
			Goal	Stadium: Estádio Municipal Presidente Getúlio Vargas

January 26 National	Fluminense	1–0	São Paulo	Fortaleza
	Goal			Stadium: Estádio Municipal Presidente Getúlio Vargas

February 2 National	Sport Recife	1–0	São Paulo	Recife
	Goal			Stadium: Estádio Adelmar da Costa Carvalho (Ilha do Retiro)

February 6 National	Santa Cruz	1–2	São Paulo	Recife
	Goal		Goal	Stadium: Estádio Adelmar da Costa Carvalho (Ilha do Retiro)

February 9 National	Sport Recife	0–3	São Paulo	Recife
			Goal	Stadium: Estádio Adelmar da Costa Carvalho (Ilha do Retiro)

March 23 National	Pelotas	0–0	São Paulo	Pelotas

April 1 National	Comercial-PR	0–2	São Paulo	Cornélio Procópio
			Goal

April 12 Taça do Povo	Santacruzense	1–1	São Paulo	Santa Cruz do Rio Pardo
	Goal		Goal	Stadium: Estádio Municipal Leônidas Camarinha

April 16 Taça Charles Miller	São Paulo	1–5	Corinthians	São Paulo
	Goal		Goal	Stadium: Estádio Municipal Paulo Machado de Carvalho (Pacaembu)

April 20 Copa Imperial	Barretos	2–3	São Paulo	Barretos
	Goal		Goal

April 21 National	Batatais	2–1	São Paulo	Batatais
	Goal		Goal	Stadium: Estádio Doutor Oswaldo Scatena

April 24 Taça Charles Miller	Santos	2–1	São Paulo	São Paulo
	Goal		Goal	Stadium: Estádio Municipal Paulo Machado de Carvalho (Pacaembu)

May 1 National	Londrina	2–3	São Paulo	Londrina
	Goal		Goal	Stadium: Estádio Vitorino Gonçalves Dias

May 4 National	Taquaritinga	1–1	São Paulo	Taquaritinga
	Goal		Goal

May 15 National	Ponte Preta	3–1	São Paulo	Campinas
	Goal		Goal	Stadium: Estádio Moisés Lucarelli

May 18 National	Guarani	3–1	São Paulo	Campinas
	Goal		Goal	Stadium: Estádio Brinco de Ouro da Princesa

May 25 National	Pastoril	0–5	São Paulo	Governador Valadares
			Goal	Stadium: Campo da Cobraice

May 31 National	Atlético Goianiense	1–0	São Paulo	Goiânia
	Goal

June 1 National	Goiânia	0–1	São Paulo	Goiânia
			Goal

June 4 National	São Paulo	1–0	Corinthians	São Paulo
	Goal			Stadium: Estádio Municipal Paulo Machado de Carvalho (Pacaembu)

June 22 National	Sanjoanense	1–4	São Paulo	São João da Boa Vista
	Goal		Goal

June 26 National	Palmeiras	4–3	São Paulo	São Paulo
	Goal		Goal	Stadium: Estádio Municipal Paulo Machado de Carvalho (Pacaembu)

June 29 National	América-SC	1–4	São Paulo	Joinville
	Goal		Goal

July 6 National	Ferroviário-PR	1–1	São Paulo	Curitiba
	Goal		Goal

September 7 National	Ferroviária (Assis)	2–5	São Paulo	Assis
	Goal		Goal

September 21 National	Sport Juiz de Fora	3–6	São Paulo	Juiz de Fora
	Goal		Goal

October 1 National	Taubaté	1–1	São Paulo	Taubaté
	Goal		Goal	Stadium: Campo do Bosque

== Official competitions ==
=== Torneio Rio-São Paulo ===
February 27 1	São Paulo	2–3	Flamengo	São Paulo
	Goal		Goal	Stadium: Estádio Municipal Paulo Machado de Carvalho (Pacaembu)

March 2 2	Fluminense	2–1	São Paulo	Rio de Janeiro
	Goal		Goal	Stadium: Estádio Jornalista Mário Filho (Maracanã)

March 8 3	Vasco da Gama	3–2	São Paulo	Rio de Janeiro
	Goal		Goal	Stadium: Estádio Jornalista Mário Filho (Maracanã)

March 12 4	São Paulo	5–2	Palmeiras	São Paulo
	Goal		Goal	Stadium: Estádio Municipal Paulo Machado de Carvalho (Pacaembu)

March 16 5	São Paulo	4–2	Santos	São Paulo
	Goal		Goal	Stadium: Estádio Municipal Paulo Machado de Carvalho (Pacaembu)

March 20 6	São Paulo	1–1	Corinthians	São Paulo
	Goal		Goal	Stadium: Estádio Municipal Paulo Machado de Carvalho (Pacaembu)

March 26 7	São Paulo	4–4	Portuguesa	São Paulo
	Goal		Goal	Stadium: Estádio Municipal Paulo Machado de Carvalho (Pacaembu)

March 29 8	São Paulo	4–0	America-RJ	São Paulo
	Goal			Stadium: Estádio Municipal Paulo Machado de Carvalho (Pacaembu)

April 6 9	Botafogo	2–5	São Paulo	Rio de Janeiro
	Goal		Goal	Stadium: Estádio Jornalista Mário Filho (Maracanã)

==== Record ====
Final Position	Points	Matches	Wins	Draws	Losses	Goals For	Goals Away	Win%
4th	10	9	4	2	3	28	19	45%

=== Campeonato Paulista ===
July 13 1	Comercial	1–1	São Paulo	São Paulo
	Goal		Goal	Stadium: Estádio Municipal Paulo Machado de Carvalho (Pacaembu)

July 17 2	São Paulo	4–0	XV de Piracicaba	São Paulo
	Goal			Stadium: Estádio Municipal Paulo Machado de Carvalho (Pacaembu)

July 20 3	Jabaquara	1–2	São Paulo	Santos
	Goal		Goal	Stadium: Estádio Urbano Caldeira (Vila Belmiro)

July 23 4	São Paulo	1–1	Noroeste	São Paulo
	Goal		Goal	Stadium: Estádio Municipal Paulo Machado de Carvalho (Pacaembu)

July 27 5	Ferroviária	2–4	São Paulo	Araraquara
	Goal		Goal	Stadium: Estádio Doutor Adhemar de Barros (Estádio Doutor Adhemar de Barros)

July 31 6	São Paulo	3–0	Ypiranga	São Paulo
	Goal			Stadium: Estádio Municipal Paulo Machado de Carvalho (Pacaembu)

August 3 7	Nacional	1–1	São Paulo	São Paulo
	Goal		Goal	Stadium: Estádio Nicolau Alayon (Comendador Sousa)

August 7 8	São Paulo	6–0	Guarani	São Paulo
	Goal			Stadium: Estádio Municipal Paulo Machado de Carvalho (Pacaembu)

August 10 9	São Paulo	5–1	Portuguesa	São Paulo
	Goal		Goal	Stadium: Estádio Municipal Paulo Machado de Carvalho (Pacaembu)

August 13 10	Corinthians	2–0	São Paulo	São Paulo
	Goal			Stadium: Estádio Municipal Paulo Machado de Carvalho (Pacaembu)

August 17 11	Santos	1–0	São Paulo	Santos
	Goal			Stadium: Estádio Urbano Caldeira (Vila Belmiro)

August 20 12	São Paulo	2–0	Juventus	São Paulo
	Goal			Stadium: Estádio Municipal Paulo Machado de Carvalho (Pacaembu)

August 24 13	Taubaté	1–2	São Paulo	Taubaté
	Goal		Goal	Stadium: Campo do Bosque

August 28 14	São Paulo	3–2	Portuguesa Santista	São Paulo
	Goal		Goal	Stadium: Estádio Palestra Itália (Parque Antártica)

August 31 15	XV de Jaú	0–3	São Paulo	Jaú
			Goal	Stadium: Estádio Artur Simões

September 4 16	São Paulo	3–2	Botafogo-SP	São Paulo
	Goal		Goal	Stadium: Estádio Palestra Itália (Parque Antártica)

September 11 17	São Paulo	3–1	América-SP	São Paulo
	Goal		Goal	Stadium: Estádio Palestra Itália (Parque Antártica)

September 14 18	Ponte Preta	1–3	São Paulo	Campinas
	Goal		Goal	Stadium: Estádio Moisés Lucarelli

September 17 19	São Paulo	1–1	Palmeiras	São Paulo
	Goal		Goal	Stadium: Estádio Municipal Paulo Machado de Carvalho (Pacaembu)

September 28 20	São Paulo	3–0	XV de Jaú	São Paulo
	Goal			Stadium: Estádio Municipal Paulo Machado de Carvalho (Pacaembu)

October 4 21	São Paulo	4–1	Comercial	São Paulo
	Goal		Goal	Stadium: Estádio Municipal Paulo Machado de Carvalho (Pacaembu)

October 8 22	São Paulo	2–0	Taubaté	São Paulo
	Goal			Stadium: Estádio Municipal Paulo Machado de Carvalho (Pacaembu)

October 12 23	Guarani	0–1	São Paulo	Campinas
			Goal	Stadium: Estádio Brinco de Ouro da Princesa

October 15 24	São Paulo	3–2	Nacional	São Paulo
	Goal		Goal	Stadium: Estádio Municipal Paulo Machado de Carvalho (Pacaembu)

October 18 25	Botafogo-SP	2–1	São Paulo	Ribeirão Preto
	Goal		Goal	Stadium: Estádio Luís Pereira

October 26 26	São Paulo	5–1	Ypiranga	Santo André
	Goal		Goal

October 29 27	São Paulo	4–2	Juventus	São Paulo
	Goal		Goal	Stadium: Estádio Municipal Paulo Machado de Carvalho (Pacaembu)

November 1 28	América-SP	0–2	São Paulo	São José do Rio Preto
			Goal	Stadium: Estádio Mário Alves Mendonça

November 6 29	São Paulo	2–1	Ferroviária	São Paulo
	Goal		Goal	Stadium: Estádio Municipal Paulo Machado de Carvalho (Pacaembu)

November 9 30	São Paulo	3–1	Portuguesa	São Paulo
	Goal		Goal	Stadium: Estádio Municipal Paulo Machado de Carvalho (Pacaembu)

November 16 31	XV de Piracicaba	2–2	São Paulo	Piracicaba
	Goal		Goal	Stadium: Estádio Roberto Gomes Pedrosa

November 23 32	Noroeste	1–3	São Paulo	Bauru
	Goal		Goal	Stadium: Campo do Bauru

November 26 33	São Paulo	1–1	Corinthians	São Paulo
	Goal		Goal	Stadium: Estádio Municipal Paulo Machado de Carvalho (Pacaembu)

November 29 34	São Paulo	1–1	Ponte Preta	São Paulo
	Goal		Goal	Stadium: Estádio Municipal Paulo Machado de Carvalho (Pacaembu)

December 3 35	São Paulo	4–1	Jabaquara	São Paulo
	Goal		Goal	Stadium: Estádio Municipal Paulo Machado de Carvalho (Pacaembu)

December 6 36	Palmeiras	2–2	São Paulo	São Paulo
	Goal		Goal	Stadium: Estádio Municipal Paulo Machado de Carvalho (Pacaembu)

December 13 37	Portuguesa Santista	1–1	São Paulo	Santos
	Goal		Goal	Stadium: Estádio Ulrico Mursa

December 18 38	Santos	2–2	São Paulo	São Paulo
	Goal		Goal	Stadium: Estádio Municipal Paulo Machado de Carvalho (Pacaembu)

==== Record ====
Final Position	Points	Matches	Wins	Draws	Losses	Goals For	Goals Away	Win%
2nd	60	38	25	10	3	93	39	78%
