= Clube Ferroviário da Beira =

Clube Ferroviário da Beira may refer to:

- Clube Ferroviário da Beira (basketball), basketball section of the multi-sports club
- Clube Ferroviário da Beira (football), football section of the multi-sports club
