= AD Macuácua =

Mozambican football club

- Full name: Associação Desportiva de Macuácua
- Founded: 2012
- Chairman: Timóteo Fuel
- League: Moçambola 2

Associação Desportiva de Macuácua is a football club based in Macuácua (Manjacaze District), Gaza Province, Mozambique, which currently competes in the Moçambola 2 (South Zone). AD Macuácua was founded for employees of the Construções Fuel company in 2012.

AD Macuácua participated in the Moçambola for the first time in 2017, following promotion for winning the 2016 Moçambola 2 (South Zone) championship. The club finished bottom of the league in 2017 and were relegated.
