= Estrela Vermelha (Beira) =

- Full name: GD Estrela Vermelha
- Founded: 1979
- Ground: Estádio do Ferroviário; Beira, Mozambique
- Capacity: 7,000
- League: Moçambola

Estrela Vermelha Beira, or simply Estrela Vermelha, is a Mozambique multi sports club from Beira, Mozambique especially known for its football.

Estrela Vermelha was relegated from the Moçambola (the top division of Mozambique football) following the 2016 season.

== Stadium ==
Currently the team plays at the 7000 capacity Estádio do Ferroviário.
