= Mor Pouye =

Senegalese footballer

Personal information
- Full name: Mor Pouye
- Date of birth: 21 November 1994 (age 31)
- Place of birth: Dakar, Senegal
- Position: Midfielder

Youth career
- 2008–2009: US Rail
- 2009–2010: Génération Foot
- 2010–2011: Metz
- 2012: Novara Calcio

Senior career*
Years	Team	Apps	(Gls)
2013	Gloria Bistriţa	8	(0)
2013–2014	Olhanense	0	(0)
2014	→ Louletano (loan)	7	(0)
Total		15	(0)
- * Club domestic league appearances and goals as of 15 July 2014

Mor Pouye (born 21 November 1994) is a Senegalese former footballer who played as a midfielder.
