= Football in Mozambique =

- Country: Mozambique
- Governing body: Mozambican Football Federation
- National team: men's national team

National competitions
- Taça de Moçambique

Club competitions
- Moçambola

International competitions
- Champions League; CAF Confederation Cup; Super Cup; FIFA Club World Cup; FIFA World Cup (National Team); African Cup of Nations (National Team)

The sport of football in the country of Mozambique is run by the Mozambican Football Federation. The association administers the national football team, as well as the national league. Football is the most popular sport in the country. Approximately 30% of the people in Mozambique are considered football fans. Eswatini, Malawi, Tanzania, Zambia and Zimbabwe are the neighbouring countries with a relative comparable percentage.

== History ==
Since the arrival of Vasco da Gama in 1498, the Portuguese increasingly strengthened their presence in the country until Mozambique's independence from Portugal in 1975, when the country became a Portuguese colony. To this day, therefore, football in Mozambique is characterized by its Portuguese origins and relationships, for example by partly former, partly still current affiliate associations of the Portuguese clubs Sporting CP and Benfica. Also, many Mozambican footballers play in Portugal. The most famous example might be Eusébio. He began his footballing career in 1957 at Clube de Desportos do Maxaquene, which was founded on May 20, 1920 in the capital of Mozambique as Sporting CP's sixth branch club. From 1960 Eusébio then played for Benfica, where he was eleven times Portuguese champion and 1962 European Champions Cup (now the UEFA Champions League) won. He became European Footballer of the Year in 1965 and was the top scorer of the 1966 World Cup.

Already since 1922 regular championships in Mozambique were played out, at first only as a district championship of Lourenço Marques (today Maputo), from 1956 as the national championship of the Portuguese overseas province of Mozambique.

In 1975, Mozambique became independent from Portugal, and in 1976 the National Football Association of the Republic of Mozambique, the Mozambican Football Federation was founded. Since then, FMF has been directing football leagues in the country and is responsible for the national football teams.

== Domestic football ==
Since 1976, FMF has organized the country's top division, the Campeonato Moçambicano de Futebol, better known as Moçambola. Record Champions are Clube Ferroviário de Maputo (founded in 1924) and CD Costa do Sol (founded in 1924), each with nine titles. In 2014, for the fourth time in five years, the club Muçulmana became national champion.

The Moçambola's three last-placed clubs are relegated to the second division, the single-track Segunda Divisão with 21 clubs. Under this second league follow the eleven supreme leagues of the football associations of the eleven Mozambican provinces.

The national trophy of the FMF, the Taça de Moçambique, has been played since 1978. The first winner was CD Maxaquene, who have won the cup nine times (as of December 2014). However, CD Costa do Sol have won the cup the most, with 11 trophies. In 2013 and 2014, Clube Ferroviário da Beira won the trophy.

Mozambique clubs have often played in the CAF Champions League and the African Cup Winners' Cup. However, no club has won a continental title (as of January 2015).

== National team ==
The Mozambican national football team has participated in FIFA tournaments since the 1980 FIFA World Cup finals. So far they have not qualified for a World Cup.

Mozambique has already participated in the Africa Cup of Nations four times, in 1986, 1996, 1998 and 2010. They were eliminated in all four tournaments in the preliminary round.

In the African Nations Championships Mozambique qualified for the first time in 2014, but were eliminated in the preliminary round.

At the Nations Cup of Southern Africa, the COSAFA Cup, Mozambique have participated in every edition so far, joint hosting in 2007. They have twice reached the final, in 2008 and in 2015.

Mozambique also took part in every edition of the football tournaments in the framework of the Jogos da Lusofonia, the "Lusofonia Games", and were meant to host in 2017 prior to cancellation.

In December 2014, Mozambique finished 98th in the FIFA World Ranking. The highest FIFA placement reached by the national team was in November 1997 in 66th place, the worst in July 2005 in 134th place. Chiquinho Conde is contracted to be head coach of the Mozambique national team until 2026.

== Women's football ==
The Mozambique women's national football team took part in the first Women's Africa Cup of Nations in 1998, but lost in the preliminary round. Since then, Mozambique has not qualified again (as of 2014).

In December 2014, Mozambique finished 133rd in the FIFA Women's World Ranking.

Felice Lemos caused quite a stir in 2013. She was known as the first female coach of a male football team, when she took over the first team of the club Zixaxa in the capital Maputo. She reported a lot of encouragement from the players and the fans, but she also experienced misogynist discrimination on the part of her coaching colleagues.

== League system ==
Level	League(s)/Division(s)
1	Moçambola; 16 clubs
	↓↑ 3 clubs
2	Mozambican Provincial Leagues; 11 leagues

== Football stadiums in Mozambique ==
#	Image	Stadium	Capacity	City	Home team
1		Estádio da Machava	45,000	Maputo	Clube Ferroviário de Maputo
2		Estádio do Zimpeto	42,000	Maputo	Mozambique national football team
3		Estádio do Maxaquene	15,000	Maputo	Clube de Desportos do Maxaquene
4		Estádio do Costa do Sol	10,000	Maputo	CD Costa do Sol
5		Estádio Municipal 1º de Maio	10,000	Lichinga	Futebol Clube de Lichinga
6		Estádio Municipal de Pemba	10,000	Pemba	Clube Ferroviário de Pemba
7		Estádio Matateu	8,000	Maputo	Grupo Desportivo de Maputo
8		Estádio do Ferroviário da Beira	5,000	Beira	Clube Ferroviário da Beira

== Attendances ==
The average attendance per top-flight football league season and the club with the highest average attendance:

Season	League average	Best club	Best club average
2023	996	Ferroviário de Lichinga	3,118

Source: League page on Wikipedia

== See also ==
- Lists of stadiums
