= Estádio Matateu =

Coordinates: 25.9747°S 32.5797°E

Estádio Matateu is a multi-purpose stadium in Maputo, Mozambique. It is currently used mostly for football matches and is the home stadium of Grupo Desportivo de Maputo. The stadium holds 8,000 people.

It was initially known as Estádio 1º de Maio until the General Assembly of Grupo Desportivo 1º de Maio unanimously approved a proposal to revise the club's statutes in 2021, changing the name to Estádio Matateu.
