= Estádio do Chingale =

- Address: Tete; Mozambique
- Coordinates: 16.1625°S 33.5963°E
- Type: Multi-purpose
- Capacity: 5,000

Estádio do Chingale is a multi-purpose stadium in Tete, Mozambique. It is currently used mostly for football matches and is the home stadium of Chingale de Tete. The stadium holds 5,000 people.
