= FC Chibuto =

Chibuto
- Full name: Clube do Chibuto
- Founded: 1949
- Ground: Campo do Chibuto; Chibuto, Mozambique
- Capacity: 2,000
- League: Moçambola
- 2014: 7th

Clube do Chibuto, or simply Chibuto, is a Mozambique multi sports club from Chibuto especially known for its football.

Clube do Chibuto was founded on 29 September 1949.

The team plays in Moçambola.

== Stadium ==
Currently the team plays at the 2,000 capacity Campo do Chibuto.
