= CD de Nacala =

Mozambique sports club

Nacala
- Full name: Clube Desportivo de Nacala
- Founded: 1964
- Ground: Estadio 25 de Junho; Nanpula, Mozambique
- Capacity: 5,000
- League: Moçambola
- 2025: 13th

Clube Desportivo de Nacala, or simply Nacala, is a Mozambique multi sports club from Nacala especially known for its football.

Desportivo de Nacala was founded on 24 July 1964.

The team plays in Moçambola.

== Stadium ==
Currently the team plays at the 5,000 capacity Estadio 25 de Junho.
