= Estádio Da Liga Muçulmana =

- Full name: Estádio Da Liga Muçulmana
- Location: Matola, Mozambique
- Capacity: 5,000

Tenant
- Liga Muçulmana de Maputo

Estádio Da Liga Muçulmana is a multi-use stadium in Matola, Mozambique. It is currently used mostly for football matches, on club level by Liga Muçulmana de Maputo of the Moçambola. The stadium has a capacity of 5,000 spectators.
