= FC Lichinga =

Lichinga
- Full name: Futebol Clube de Lichinga
- Founded: 1921
- Ground: Estádio Municipal 1º de Maio de Lichinga; Lichinga, Mozambique
- Capacity: 10,000
- Manager: Ronald Chenko
- League: Moçambola
Home colours	Away colours

Futebol Clube de Lichinga, usually known as Lichinga is an association football club from Lichinga in Mozambique, playing in the top division in Mozambican football, Moçambola.

The club was founded in 1921.
