= 1º de Maio de Quelimane =

Football club based in Mozambique

- Ground: Estádio 1º de Maio
- Capacity: 8000

1º de Maio de Quelimane is a football club based in Quelimane, Mozambique. As of 2016, 1º de Maio competed in the Moçambola, the premiere football league of Mozambique.

The club (colloquially known as Operários) narrowly avoided relegation from the Moçambola during the 2016 season.

In the 2018 Moçambola season, 1º de Maio de Quelimane played in the top flight. The club faced challenges with their home fixtures when the Liga Moçambicana de Futebol temporarily prohibited the use of their usual ground, requiring them to seek an alternative venue for upcoming matches.
