= CD Chingale =

Mozambican football club

Chingale de Tete
- Full name: Chingale de Tete
- Ground: Estádio do Chingale; Tete, Mozambique
- Capacity: 5.000
- Manager: Tiago Machaisse
- League: Moçambola
- 2025: 10th
Home colours

The Clube dos Desportos de Chingale is a Mozambican football club based in Tete. They play in the top division in Mozambican football, Moçambola. Their home stadium is Estádio do Chingale.

The club was originally founded as Futebol Clube de Tete in the 1950s, and was renamed Sporting Clube do Tete in 1964. In 1981, the club was renamed Clube dos Desportos de Chingale.

== Performance in African competitions ==
- CAF Cup: 1 appearance

Best: 1999–00 First Round – Lost against (Tunisia) Étoile du Sahel 11–0 on aggregate

== Current squad ==
Note: Flags indicate national team as defined under FIFA eligibility rules; some limited exceptions apply. Players may hold more than one non-FIFA nationality.

No.	Pos.	Nation	Player
1	GK	MOZ	Macobolo
2	MF	MOZ	Pelembo
3	MF	GHA	Mohammad Wilson
4	MF	EGY	Mahomed Aliyaz
5	DF	MOZ	Carmonho
6	DF	EGY	Mostafa
7	DF	TAN	Seygou Camara
8	FW	MOZ	Allinho
9	FW	MOZ	Lokdar
10	MF	MOZ	Uzaras
11	FW	MOZ	Cverto
12	GK	MOZ	Djalinho
13	MF	MOZ	Urinhou

No.	Pos.	Nation	Player
14	DF	MOZ	Chirinza
16	DF	MOZ	Semedo
17	FW	MOZ	Koluna
20	FW	MOZ	Postadilho
22	GK	MOZ	Aramarilho
23	FW	MOZ	Suarez Canaz
24	GK	MOZ	Purunga Vemma
25	DF	MOZ	Defache
32	DF	POR	Keskao
34	MF	MOZ	Hdinga
35	DF	MOZ	Belanio
42	MF	MOZ	Putrenho
44	DF	MOZ	Zeghiro
