= Clube Ferroviário de Quelimane =

Mozambican football club

- Full name: Clube Ferroviário de Quelimane
- Founded: 1924
- Ground: Campo do Ferroviário de Quelimane; Quelimane, Mozambique
- League: Moçambola 2 (Center Zone)

Clube Ferroviário de Quelimane is a football club from Quelimane, Mozambique, that plays in the regionalized Moçambola 2 (Center Zone).

The club finished bottom of the Moçambola in 2015 and were relegated.
