= Chibuto =

- Nickname: ximbutsu mzaya
- Location within Mozambique
- Coordinates: 24°41′S 33°32′E
- Country: Mozambique
- Provinces: Gaza Province

Population (2007 census)
  - Total: 63,184

Chibuto is a city located in the province of Gaza in Mozambique, about 200 km north of the capital, Maputo. It is the principal city of Chibuto District and is served by Chibuto Airport.

== Demographics ==
Year	Population
1997	47,963
2008	57,281
