= Estádio do Ferroviário =

Multi-purpose stadium in Mozambique

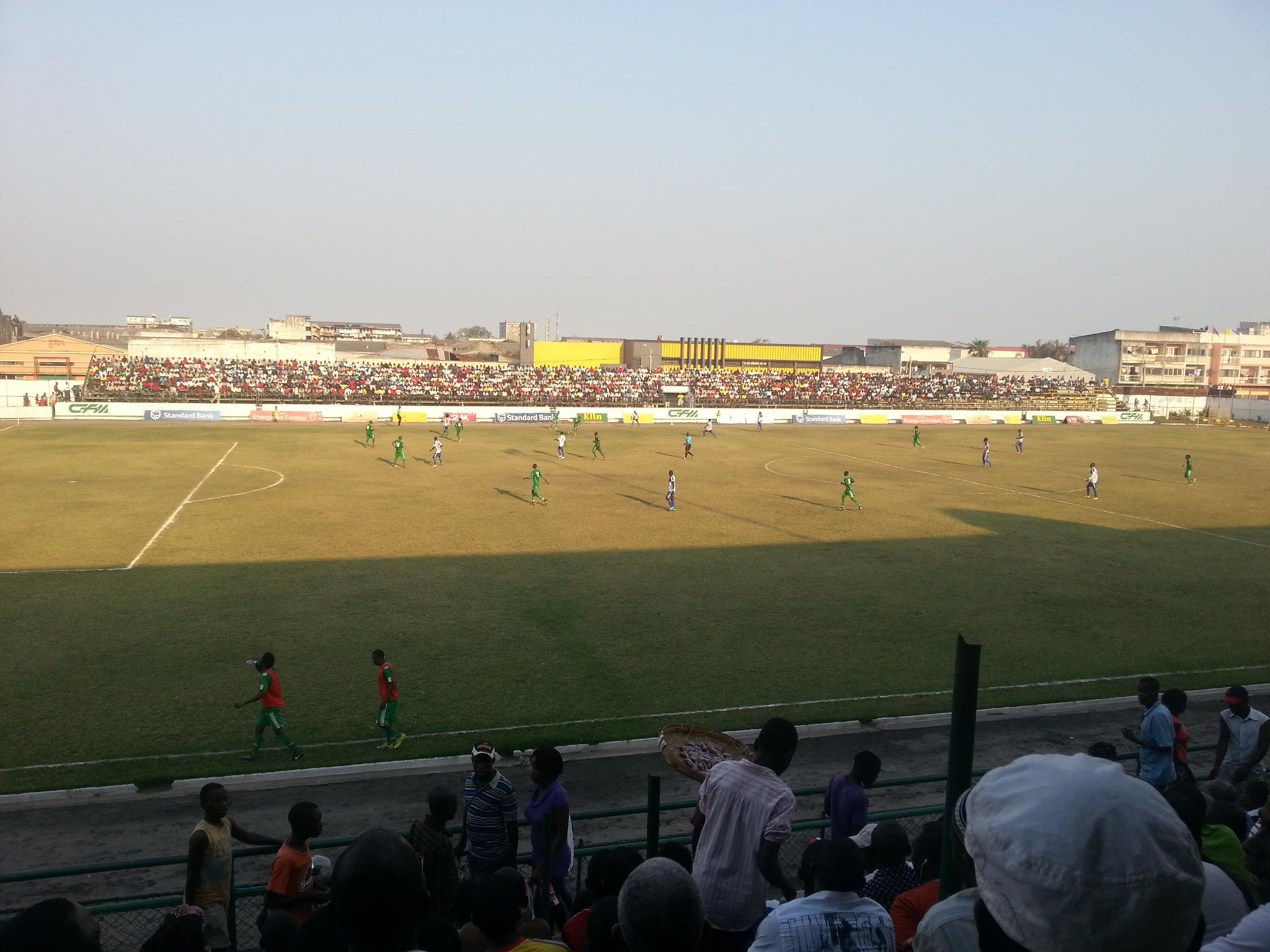
- Mozambican football facilities.
- Interactive map of Estádio do Ferroviário
- Former names: Estádio do Chiveve
- Address: Beira; Mozambique
- Coordinates: 19.821751°S 34.841616°E
- Capacity: 7,000
- Type: Multi-Purpose
- Surface: grass

The Estádio do Ferroviário da Beira is a multi-purpose stadium in Beira, Mozambique. It is currently used mostly for football matches and is the home stadium of Clube Ferroviário da Beira. The stadium holds 7,000 people.
