= Clube Ferroviário Pemba =

Mozambican multi sports club

Ferroviário de Pemba
- Full name: Clube Ferroviário de Pemba
- Founded: 1924
- Ground: Estadio Municipal CFM; Pemba, Mozambique
- Capacity: 10,000
- League: Moçambola

Clube Ferroviário de Pemba, or simply Pemba, is a Mozambique multi sports club from Pemba especially known for its football.

The team plays in Moçambola.

== Stadium ==
Currently the team plays at the 10000 capacity Estadio Municipal CFM.
