= Estádio do Costa do Sol =

Multi-purpose stadium in Maputo, Mozambique

- Interactive map of Estádio do Costa do Sol
- Address: Maputo; Mozambique
- Coordinates: 25°56′28.91″S 32°36′58.26″E
- Capacity: 10,000

Tenant
- Clube de Desportos da Costa do Sol

Estádio do Costa do Sol is a multi-purpose stadium in Maputo, Mozambique. It is currently used mostly for football matches and is the home stadium of Clube de Desportos da Costa do Sol. The stadium holds 10,000 people.
