= Estádio do Maxaquene =

Stadium in Maputo, Mozambique

Maxaquene Stadium
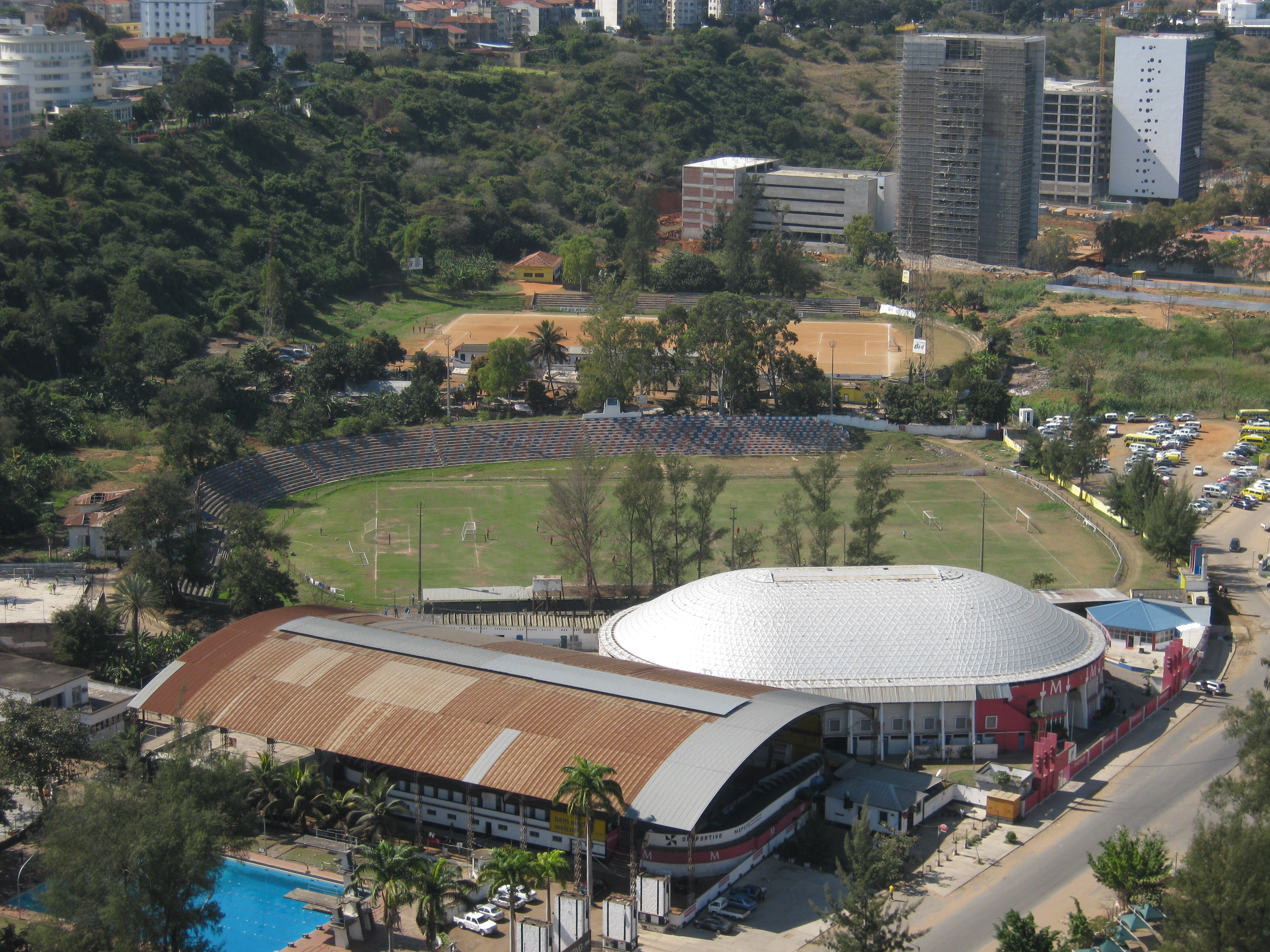
- Stadium of Club Desportivo Maxaquene, Maputo, Mozambique
- Interactive map of Maxaquene Stadium
- Address: Maputo; Mozambique
- Coordinates: 25.97452°S 32.577955°E
- Capacity: 15,000
- Type: Multi-purpose
- Surface: Grass
- Current use: Association football

Estádio do Maxaquene is a multi-purpose stadium in Maputo, Mozambique. It is currently used mostly for football matches and is the home stadium of Clube de Desportos do Maxaquene. The stadium holds 15,000 people.
