= Vilankulo F.C. =

- Full name: Vilankulo Futebol Clube
- Founded: July 10, 2004
- Ground: Estádio Municipal de Vilankulo, Vilankulo
- Capacity: 5,000
- Chairman: Yassin Amuji
- Manager: Chiquinho Conde
- League: Moçambola
- 2012: 5th
- Website: http://www.vfc.co.mz/
Home colours	Away colours

Vilankulo F.C., short name VFC and better known under the name ENH de Vilankulos, is a Mozambican football (soccer) club based in Vilankulo that plays in the top division of Mozambican football, Moçambola.
